= 4th Scottish Parliament =

Legislature elected in 2011

| ← | 3rd Scottish Parliament | 5th Scottish Parliament | → |
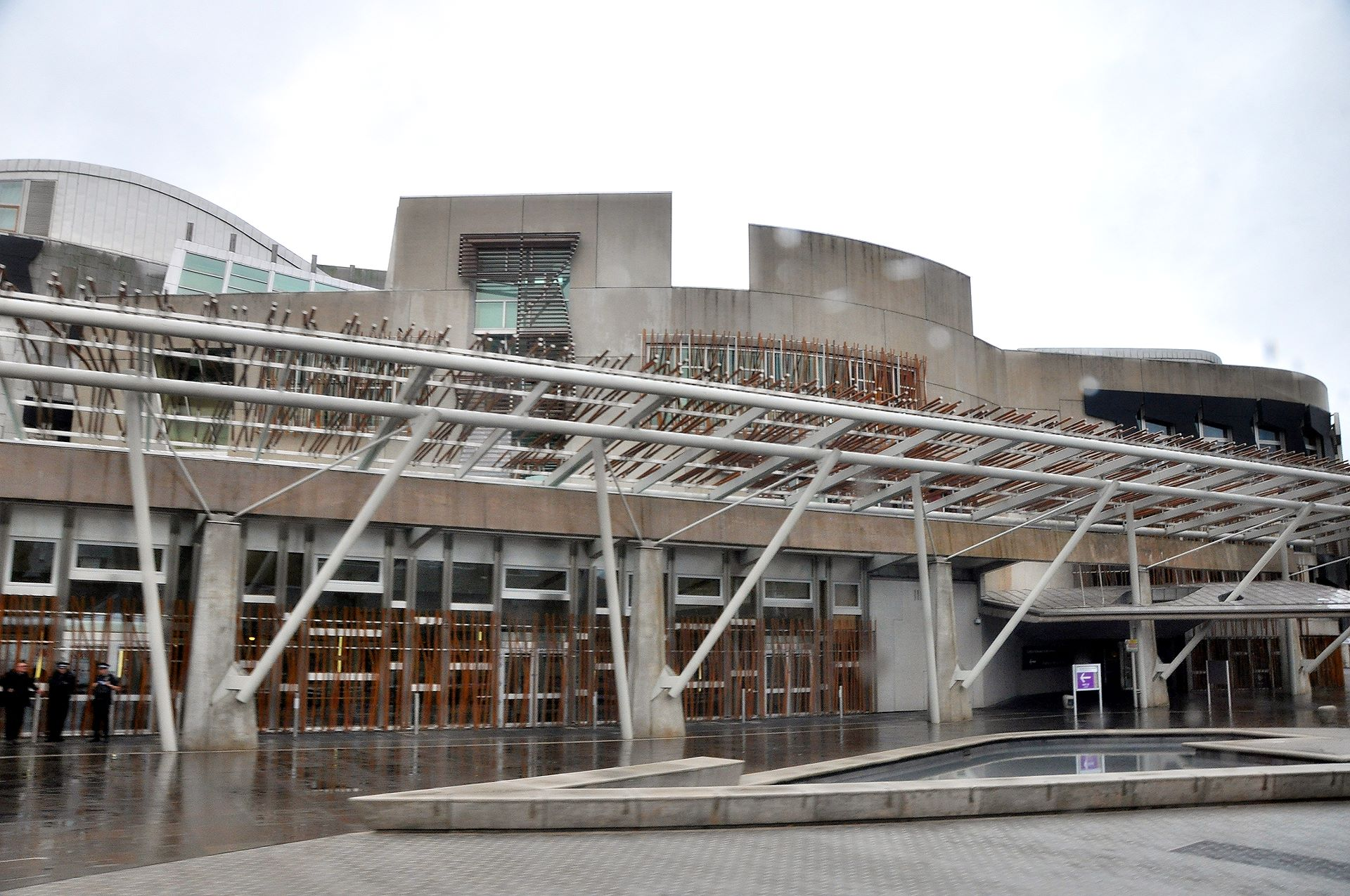
- Scottish Parliament Building, 2015

Overview
- Legislative body: Scottish Parliament
- Jurisdiction: Scotland
- Meeting place: Scottish Parliament Building
- Term: 11 May 2011 – 24 March 2016
- Election: 2011
- Government: Second Salmond government First Sturgeon government
- Members: 129
- Presiding Officer: Rt Hon Tricia Marwick
- First Minister of Scotland: Alex Salmond (2011–14); Nicola Sturgeon (2014–16)
- Deputy First Minister: Nicola Sturgeon (2011–14); John Swinney (2014–16)
- Leader of the largest opposition party: Iain Gray (2011); Johann Lamont (2011–14); Jackie Baillie (2014); Kezia Dugdale (2014–15); Iain Gray (2015); Kezia Dugdale (2015–16)

This is a list of members (MSPs) returned to the fourth Scottish Parliament at the 2011 general election. Of the 129 MSPs, 73 were elected from first past the post constituencies with a further 56 members being returned from eight regions, each electing seven MSPs as a form of mixed member proportional representation.

The 2011 election produced an unexpected majority government with the governing Scottish National Party winning 69 seats, to the opposition Scottish Labour Party's 37 (down seven seats from the previous election). First Minister, Alex Salmond went on to form his second government.

== Composition ==
| Party | | May 2011 election | March 2016 dissolution |
|---|---|---|---|
| • | Scottish National Party | 69 | 64 |
| | Scottish Labour Party | 37 (Note: Includes 11 MSPs sponsored by the Co-operative Party, who are designated Labour and Co-operative.) | 38 (Note: Includes 10 MSPs sponsored by the Co-operative Party, who are designated Labour and Co-operative.) |
| | Scottish Conservative Party | 15 | 15 |
| | Scottish Liberal Democrats | 5 | 5 |
| | Scottish Green Party | 2 | 2 |
| | Independents | 1 | 3 |
| | Presiding Officer | 0 | 1 |
| Total | | 129 | 128 |
| Vacant | | 0 | 1 |
| Government majority | | 9 | 1 |

Government parties denoted with bullets (•)

== Graphical representation ==
These are graphical representations of the Scottish Parliament showing a comparison of party strengths as it was directly after the 2011 general election and its composition at the time of its dissolution in March 2016:

- Note this is not the official seating plan of the Scottish Parliament.

== List of MSPs ==
This is a list of MSPs at dissolution. The changes table below records all changes in party affiliation during the session. See here a list of MSPs elected in the 2011 election.

| Name | Image | Member for | Type | Party |
|---|---|---|---|---|
| George Adam | | Paisley | Constituency | Scottish National Party |
| Clare Adamson | | Central Scotland | Regional | Scottish National Party |
| Alasdair Allan | | Na h-Eileanan an Iar | Constituency | Scottish National Party |
| Christian Allard | | North East Scotland (since 15/05/13) | Regional | Scottish National Party |
| Jackie Baillie | | Dumbarton | Constituency | Labour |
| Claire Baker | | Mid Scotland and Fife | Regional | Labour Co-op |
| Jayne Baxter | | Mid Scotland and Fife (since 7/12/12) | Regional | Labour |
| Claudia Beamish | | South Scotland | Regional | Labour Co-op |
| Colin Beattie | | Midlothian North and Musselburgh | Constituency | Scottish National Party |
| Marco Biagi | | Edinburgh Central | Constituency | Scottish National Party |
| Neil Bibby | | West Scotland | Regional | Labour Co-op |
| Sarah Boyack | | Lothian | Regional | Labour Co-op |
| Lesley Brennan | | North East Scotland (since 13/1/16) | Regional | Labour |
| Chic Brodie | | South Scotland | Regional | Scottish National Party |
| Gavin Brown | | Lothian | Regional | Conservative |
| Keith Brown | | Clackmannanshire and Dunblane | Constituency | Scottish National Party |
| Cameron Buchanan | | Lothian (since 04/09/13) | Regional | Conservative |
| Margaret Burgess | | Cunninghame South | Constituency | Scottish National Party |
| Aileen Campbell | | Clydesdale | Constituency | Scottish National Party |
| Roderick Campbell | | North East Fife | Constituency | Scottish National Party |
| Jackson Carlaw | | West Scotland | Regional | Conservative |
| Malcolm Chisholm | | Edinburgh North and Leith | Constituency | Labour |
| Willie Coffey | | Kilmarnock and Irvine Valley | Constituency | Scottish National Party |
| Angela Constance | | Almond Valley | Constituency | Scottish National Party |
| Bruce Crawford | | Stirling | Constituency | Scottish National Party |
| Roseanna Cunningham | | Perthshire South and Kinross-shire | Constituency | Scottish National Party |
| Ruth Davidson | | Glasgow | Regional | Conservative |
| Graeme Dey | | Angus South | Constituency | Scottish National Party |
| Nigel Don | | Angus North and Mearns | Constituency | Scottish National Party |
| Bob Doris | | Glasgow | Regional | Scottish National Party |
| James Dornan | | Glasgow Cathcart | Constituency | Scottish National Party |
| Kezia Dugdale | | Lothian | Regional | Labour Co-op |
| Jim Eadie | | Edinburgh Southern | Constituency | Scottish National Party |
| Annabelle Ewing | | Mid Scotland and Fife | Regional | Scottish National Party |
| Fergus Ewing | | Inverness and Nairn | Constituency | Scottish National Party |
| Linda Fabiani | | East Kilbride | Constituency | Scottish National Party |
| Mary Fee | | West Scotland | Regional | Labour |
| Patricia Ferguson | | Glasgow Maryhill and Springburn | Constituency | Labour |
| Alex Fergusson | | Galloway and West Dumfries | Constituency | Conservative |
| Neil Findlay | | Lothian | Regional | Labour |
| John Finnie | | Highlands and Islands | Regional | Independent |
| Joe FitzPatrick | | Dundee City West | Constituency | Scottish National Party |
| Murdo Fraser | | Mid Scotland and Fife | Regional | Conservative |
| Kenneth Gibson | | Cunninghame North | Constituency | Scottish National Party |
| Rob Gibson | | Caithness, Sutherland and Ross | Constituency | Scottish National Party |
| Annabel Goldie | | West Scotland | Regional | Conservative |
| Christine Grahame | | Midlothian South, Tweeddale and Lauderdale | Constituency | Scottish National Party |
| Rhoda Grant | | Highlands and Islands | Regional | Labour Co-op |
| Iain Gray | | East Lothian | Constituency | Labour |
| Mark Griffin | | Central Scotland | Regional | Labour |
| Patrick Harvie | | Glasgow | Regional | Green |
| Hugh Henry | | Renfrewshire South | Constituency | Labour |
| Jamie Hepburn | | Cumbernauld and Kilsyth | Constituency | Scottish National Party |
| Cara Hilton | | Dunfermline (since 25/10/13) | Constituency | Labour |
| Jim Hume | | South Scotland | Regional | Liberal Democrats |
| Fiona Hyslop | | Linlithgow | Constituency | Scottish National Party |
| Adam Ingram | | Carrick, Cumnock and Doon Valley | Constituency | Scottish National Party |
| Alex Johnstone | | North East Scotland | Regional | Conservative |
| Alison Johnstone | | Lothian | Regional | Green |
| Colin Keir | | Edinburgh Western | Constituency | Scottish National Party |
| James Kelly | | Rutherglen | Constituency | Labour Co-op |
| Bill Kidd | | Glasgow Anniesland | Constituency | Scottish National Party |
| Johann Lamont | | Glasgow Pollok | Constituency | Labour Co-op |
| John Lamont | | Ettrick, Roxburgh and Berwickshire | Constituency | Conservative |
| Richard Lochhead | | Moray | Constituency | Scottish National Party |
| Richard Lyle | | Central Scotland | Regional | Scottish National Party |
| Kenny MacAskill | | Edinburgh Eastern | Constituency | Scottish National Party |
| Angus MacDonald | | Falkirk East | Constituency | Scottish National Party |
| Gordon MacDonald | | Edinburgh Pentlands | Constituency | Scottish National Party |
| Lewis Macdonald | | North East Scotland | Regional | Labour |
| Ken Macintosh | | Eastwood | Constituency | Labour Co-op |
| Derek Mackay | | Renfrewshire North and West | Constituency | Scottish National Party |
| Mike MacKenzie | | Highlands and Islands | Regional | Scottish National Party |
| Hanzala Malik | | Glasgow | Regional | Labour |
| Jenny Marra | | North East Scotland | Regional | Labour |
| Paul Martin | | Glasgow Provan | Constituency | Labour |
| Tricia Marwick | | Mid Fife and Glenrothes | Constituency | Presiding Officer |
| John Mason | | Glasgow Shettleston | Constituency | Scottish National Party |
| Michael Matheson | | Falkirk West | Constituency | Scottish National Party |
| Stewart Maxwell | | West Scotland | Regional | Scottish National Party |
| Joan McAlpine | | South Scotland | Regional | Scottish National Party |
| Liam McArthur | | Orkney | Constituency | Liberal Democrats |
| Margaret McCulloch | | Central Scotland | Regional | Labour |
| Mark McDonald | | Aberdeen Donside (since 20/06/13) | Constituency | Scottish National Party |
| Margaret McDougall | | West Scotland | Regional | Labour |
| Sir Jamie McGrigor, Bt | | Highlands and Islands | Regional | Conservative |
| Alison McInnes | | North East Scotland | Regional | Liberal Democrats |
| Christina McKelvie | | Hamilton, Larkhall and Stonehouse | Constituency | Scottish National Party |
| Aileen McLeod | | South Scotland | Regional | Scottish National Party |
| Fiona McLeod | | Strathkelvin and Bearsden | Constituency | Scottish National Party |
| Michael McMahon | | Uddingston and Bellshill | Constituency | Labour |
| Siobhan McMahon | | Central Scotland | Regional | Labour |
| Stuart McMillan | | West Scotland | Regional | Scottish National Party |
| Duncan McNeil | | Greenock and Inverclyde | Constituency | Labour |
| Anne McTaggart | | Glasgow | Regional | Labour |
| Nanette Milne | | North East Scotland | Regional | Conservative |
| Margaret Mitchell | | Central Scotland | Regional | Conservative |
| Elaine Murray | | Dumfriesshire | Constituency | Labour |
| Alex Neil | | Airdrie and Shotts | Constituency | Scottish National Party |
| Gil Paterson | | Clydebank and Milngavie | Constituency | Scottish National Party |
| Graeme Pearson | | South Scotland | Regional | Labour |
| John Pentland | | Motherwell and Wishaw | Constituency | Labour |
| Willie Rennie | | Mid Scotland and Fife | Regional | Liberal Democrats |
| Dennis Robertson | | Aberdeenshire West | Constituency | Scottish National Party |
| Shona Robison | | Dundee City East | Constituency | Scottish National Party |
| Alex Rowley | | Cowdenbeath (since 23/01/14) | Constituency | Labour |
| Michael Russell | | Argyll and Bute | Constituency | Scottish National Party |
| Alex Salmond | | Aberdeenshire East | Constituency | Scottish National Party |
| Mary Scanlon | | Highlands and Islands | Regional | Conservative |
| John Scott | | Ayr | Constituency | Conservative |
| Tavish Scott | | Shetland | Constituency | Liberal Democrats |
| Richard Simpson | | Mid Scotland and Fife | Regional | Labour |
| Drew Smith | | Glasgow | Regional | Labour |
| Elaine Smith | | Coatbridge and Chryston | Constituency | Labour |
| Liz Smith | | Mid Scotland and Fife | Regional | Conservative |
| Stewart Stevenson | | Banffshire and Buchan Coast | Constituency | Scottish National Party |
| David Stewart | | Highlands and Islands | Regional | Labour Co-op |
| Kevin Stewart | | Aberdeen Central | Constituency | Scottish National Party |
| Nicola Sturgeon | | Glasgow Southside | Constituency | Scottish National Party |
| John Swinney | | Perthshire North | Constituency | Scottish National Party |
| Dave Thompson | | Skye, Lochaber and Badenoch | Constituency | Scottish National Party |
| David Torrance | | Kirkcaldy | Constituency | Scottish National Party |
| Jean Urquhart | | Highlands and Islands | Regional | Independent |
| Maureen Watt | | Aberdeen South and North Kincardine | Constituency | Scottish National Party |
| Paul Wheelhouse | | South Scotland | Regional | Scottish National Party |
| Sandra White | | Glasgow Kelvin | Constituency | Scottish National Party |
| John Wilson | | Central Scotland | Regional | Independent |
| Humza Yousaf | | Glasgow | Regional | Scottish National Party |

=== Former MSPs ===
| Name | Image | Member for | Type | Party | Notes |
|---|---|---|---|---|---|
| John Park | | Mid Scotland and Fife | Regional | Labour | resigned 7 December 2012 |
| Brian Adam | | Aberdeen Donside | Constituency | Scottish National Party | died 25 April 2013 |
| David McLetchie | | Lothian | Regional | Conservative | died 12 August 2013 |
| Bill Walker | | Dunfermline | Constituency | Independent | resigned 7 September 2013 |
| Helen Eadie | | Cowdenbeath | Constituency | Labour Co-op | died 9 November 2013 |
| Margo MacDonald | | Lothian | Regional | Independent | died 4 April 2014 |
| Richard Baker | | North East Scotland | Regional | Labour | resigned 11 January 2016 |

== Changes ==
| Date | Constituency/region | Gain | Loss | Note |
|---|---|---|---|---|
| 11 May 2011 | Mid Fife and Glenrothes | Presiding Officer | SNP | Tricia Marwick is elected as the Presiding Officer and had to take voluntary suspension from her party. |
| 4 March 2012 | Dunfermline | Independent | SNP | Bill Walker was suspended from the SNP pending an investigation into domestic abuse allegations. |
| 23 October 2012 | Highlands and Islands | Independent | SNP | John Finnie resigned from the SNP because of its conference decision on NATO membership. Though he joined the Scottish Green Party in October 2014, Finnie continued to sit as an independent MSP until the end of the parliament. |
| 23 October 2012 | Highlands and Islands | Independent | SNP | Jean Urquhart resigned from the SNP because of its conference decision on NATO membership. |
| 07 December 2012 | Mid Scotland and Fife | Labour | Labour | John Park resigned as an MSP to take up a full time Trade-Union position, he is replaced by Jayne Baxter. |
| 25 April 2013 | Aberdeen Donside | | SNP | Brian Adam dies of cancer at age 64, causing a by-election. |
| 14/15 May 2013 | North East Scotland | SNP | SNP | Mark McDonald resigns his position as an MSP in order to contest the 2013 Aberdeen Donside by-election. Christian Allard takes up the vacant seat as the next (and final) name on the SNP's list for the region. |
| 20 June 2013 | Aberdeen Donside | SNP | | Mark McDonald holds the seat for the SNP in the 2013 Aberdeen Donside by-election. |
| 12 August 2013 | Lothian | Conservative | Conservative | David McLetchie dies of cancer, aged 61. He was replaced by Cameron Buchanan. |
| 7 September 2013 | Dunfermline | Labour | Independent | Bill Walker resigned following his conviction for assault, precipitating a by-election in the constituency. He was replaced by Cara Hilton. |
| 9 November 2013 | Cowdenbeath | Labour | Labour Co-op | Helen Eadie dies of cancer at age 66, causing a by-election. She was replaced by Alex Rowley. |
| 4 April 2014 | Lothian | | Independent | Margo MacDonald died, age 70. She had been elected as an independent to a regional seat and therefore no-one could be nominated as a replacement. |
| 23 September 2014 | Central Scotland | Independent | SNP | John Wilson resigned from the SNP because of its 2012 conference decision on NATO membership. Though he joined the Scottish Green Party in December 2014, Wilson continued to sit as an independent MSP until the end of the parliament. |
| 11 January 2016 | North East Scotland | Labour | Labour | Richard Baker resigned to take up a charity role, and was replaced by Lesley Brennan, the next person on the Labour regional list. |
