= Scottish Parliament constituencies and electoral regions =

Scottish Parliament constituencies and regions

The Scottish Parliament (Holyrood), created by the Scotland Act 1998, has used a system of constituencies and electoral regions since the first general election in 1999.

The parliament has 73 constituencies, each electing one Member of the Scottish Parliament (MSP) by the plurality (first-past-the-post) system of voting, and eight additional member regions, each electing seven additional MSPs. Each region is a group of constituencies, and the D'Hondt method of allocating additional member seats from party lists is used to produce a form of proportional representation for each region. The total number of parliamentary seats is 129.

Boundaries of Holyrood and House of Commons (Westminster) constituencies are subject to review by the Boundaries Scotland, and prior to the Scottish Parliament (Constituencies) Act 2004 reviews of Scottish Westminster constituencies would have been also reviews of Holyrood constituencies. The Arbuthnott Commission, in its final report, January 2006, recommended that council area boundaries and Holyrood and Scottish Westminster constituency boundaries should all be reviewed together. This recommendation has not been implemented.

== Boundaries ==
=== 1999–2011 ===
Until the 2005 general election the first-past-the-post constituencies were the same as for the House of Commons (United Kingdom Parliament, Westminster), except for Orkney and Shetland, which were separate constituencies at Holyrood, but not at Westminster. The Scottish Parliament (Constituencies) Act 2004 enabled a new set of House of Commons constituencies to be formed in Scotland in 2005, reducing their number and, therefore, the number of Scottish Members of Parliament (MPs) to 59, without change to the Holyrood constituencies and the number of MSPs.

1999 boundaries were used also for the 2003 and 2007 elections.

=== 2011–2026 ===
The first periodical review of boundaries of Scottish Parliament constituencies was announced on 3 July 2007, and the commission's final recommendations were implemented for the 2011 Scottish Parliament election.

Total numbers of constituencies, regions, and MSPs remain at, respectively, 73, 8, and 129.

=== from 2026 ===
New constituencies and regions were created by the second periodic review of Scottish Parliament boundaries.

== Historical representation by party ==
=== Central Scotland (1999–2026) / Central Scotland and Lothians West (2026–) ===
Conservative Independent Labour Liberal Democrats Reform UK Scottish National Party Scottish Senior Citizens Unity Scottish Socialist

Constituency			Members							
1999–2011	2011–2026	2026–	1999	2003	2007	2011	14	2016	2021	2026
Airdrie and Shotts		Airdrie	Whitefield			Neil			Gray	
		Almond Valley	in Lothian region							Constance
		Bathgate	in Lothian region (Linlithgow)							Stafford
Coatbridge and Chryston			E. Smith					MacGregor		
Cumbernauld and Kilsyth			Craigie			Hepburn				
Falkirk East		Falkirk East and Linlithgow	Peattie			A. MacDonald			Thomson	Day
Falkirk West			Canavan		Matheson					Bouse
Motherwell and Wishaw			McConnell			Pentland		Adamson		
Hamilton North and Bellshill	Uddingston and Bellshill		M. McMahon					Lyle	Callaghan	Bonnar
East Kilbride			A. Kerr			Fabiani			Stevenson	in South Scotland region
Hamilton South	Hamilton, Larkhall and Stonehouse		McCabe			McKelvie				in South Scotland region
Kilmarnock and Loudoun			Jamieson		Coffey	in South Scotland region				
Central Scotland (list seats)		Central Scotland and Lothians West	Gorrie		O'Donnell	Griffin				
Central Scotland (list seats)		Central Scotland and Lothians West	A. Wilson	Leckie	Hepburn	S. McMahon		Leonard		Young
Central Scotland (list seats)		Central Scotland and Lothians West	Neil			McCulloch		Lennon		Bland
Central Scotland (list seats)		Central Scotland and Lothians West	Fabiani			Lyle		E. Smith	S. Kerr	Lindsay
Central Scotland (list seats)		Central Scotland and Lothians West	Matheson		McKelvie	Adamson		G. Simpson		G. Simpson
Central Scotland (list seats)		Central Scotland and Lothians West	Paterson	Swinburne	J. Wilson		-->	Harris	Gallacher	
Central Scotland (list seats)		Central Scotland and Lothians West	McIntosh	Mitchell					Mackay	

=== Glasgow ===
Conservative Green Independent Labour Liberal Democrats Reform UK Scottish National Party Scottish Socialist Solidarity

Constituency			Members											
1999–2011	2011–2026	2026–	1999	00	02	2003	05	06	2007	09	2011	2016	2021	2026
Glasgow Anniesland			Dewar	Butler							Kidd			Merrick
Glasgow Cathcart		Glasgow Cathcart and Pollok	Watson				Gordon				Dornan			Ghani
Glasgow Govan	Glasgow Southside		Jackson						Sturgeon					Bruce
Glasgow Kelvin		Glasgow Central	McNeill								White		Stewart	Thewliss
Glasgow Rutherglen	Rutherglen	Rutherglen and Cambuslang	Hughes						Kelly			Haughey		
Glasgow Shettleston		Glasgow Baillieston and Shettleston	McAveety								Mason			Linden
Glasgow Maryhill	Glasgow Maryhill and Springburn	Glasgow Kelvin and Maryhill	Ferguson									Doris		
Glasgow Springburn	Glasgow Provan	Glasgow Easterhouse and Springburn	Martin									McKee		
Glasgow Pollok			Lamont									Yousaf		abolished
Glasgow Baillieston			Curran								abolished			
Glasgow (list seats)			Gibson			P. Harvie								
Glasgow (list seats)			Sturgeon						Doris			Sarwar		
Glasgow (list seats)			White								Yousaf	Lamont	Sweeney	
Glasgow (list seats)			Elder		-->	Kane			Ahmad	McLaughlin	Malik	Kelly	Glancy	Duane
Glasgow (list seats)			Sheridan					-->	Kidd		D. Smith	McNeill		
Glasgow (list seats)			R. Brown								McTaggart	Tomkins	Gulhane	Schmulian
Glasgow (list seats)			Aitken								R. Davidson	Wells		Kerr

=== Highlands and Islands ===
Conservative Green Independent Labour Liberal Democrats Reform UK Scottish National Party

Constituency			Members										
1999–2011	2011–2026	2026–	1999	2003	06	2007	2011	12	2016	17	19	2021	2026
Argyll and Bute			Lyon			Mather	Russell					Minto	
Caithness, Sutherland and Easter Ross	Caithness, Sutherland and Ross		Stone				Gibson		G. Ross			Todd	Green
Inverness East, Nairn and Lochaber	Inverness and Nairn		F. Ewing										Roddick
Moray			M. Ewing		Lochhead								Mitchell
Ross, Skye and Inverness West	Skye, Lochaber and Badenoch		Munro				Thompson		Forbes				Baxter
Western Isles	Na h-Eileanan an Iar		Morrison			Allan							MacKinnon
Orkney Islands			J. Wallace				McArthur						
Shetland Islands			T. Scott								Wishart		Goodlad
Highlands and Islands (list seats)			W. Ewing	Gibson			J. Finnie			-->	-->	D.Ross	MacCallum
Highlands and Islands (list seats)			Hamilton	Mather		Hamilton	MacKenzie		Todd			Roddick	Todd
Highlands and Islands (list seats)			Macmillan			D. Stewart						Burgess	
Highlands and Islands (list seats)			Grant	E. Scott		Grant							Leask
Highlands and Islands (list seats)			Peacock				Urquhart		-->	D. Ross	Johnston		Eagle
Highlands and Islands (list seats)			McGrigor						Mountain				Currie
Highlands and Islands (list seats)			Scanlon		Petrie	Scanlon			Cameron				Bannerman

=== Lothians (1999–2011) / Lothian (2011–2026) / Edinburgh and Lothians East (2026–) ===
Conservative Green Independent Labour Liberal Democrats Reform UK Scottish National Party Scottish Socialist

Constituency			Members										
1999–2011	2011–2026	2026–	1999	2003	May 2007	Aug 07	2011	13	14	2016	19	2021	2026
		East Lothian Coast and Lammermuirs	in South Scotland region										McLennan
Edinburgh East and Musselburgh	Edinburgh Eastern	Edinburgh Eastern, Musselburgh and Tranent	Deacon		MacAskill					Denham			Campbell
Edinburgh Central			Boyack				Biagi			R. Davidson		Robertson	Slater
		Edinburgh Northern	new constituency for 2026										Dijkstra-Downie
Edinburgh North and Leith	Edinburgh Northern and Leith	Edinburgh North Eastern and Leith	Chisholm							Macpherson			
Edinburgh Pentlands		Edinburgh South Western	Gray	McLetchie			G. MacDonald						Kumar
Edinburgh South	Edinburgh Southern		A. MacKay	Pringle		Eadie				Johnson			
Edinburgh West	Edinburgh Western	Edinburgh North Western	M. Smith				Keir			Cole-Hamilton			
Midlothian	Midlothian North and Musselburgh	Midlothian North	Brankin				Beattie						
Livingston	Almond Valley		Muldoon		Constance								in Central Scotland and Lothians West region
Linlithgow			Mulligan				Hyslop						in Central Scotland and Lothians West region
Lothians (list seats)	Lothian (list seats)	Edinburgh and Lothians East (list seats)	Harper				Johnstone						Nevens
Lothians (list seats)	Lothian (list seats)	Edinburgh and Lothians East (list seats)	M. MacDonald	-->					vacant	Wightman		Slater	Manivannan
Lothians (list seats)	Lothian (list seats)	Edinburgh and Lothians East (list seats)	Hyslop				Dugdale				Boyack		Ahmed
Lothians (list seats)	Lothian (list seats)	Edinburgh and Lothians East (list seats)	MacAskill			McKee	Findlay					Choudhury	Sangster
Lothians (list seats)	Lothian (list seats)	Edinburgh and Lothians East (list seats)	Steel	Fox	Tymkewycz	Somerville	Boyack			Lindhurst		Webber	Kinross
Lothians (list seats)	Lothian (list seats)	Edinburgh and Lothians East (list seats)	Douglas-Hamilton		G. Brown					Balfour			Ross
Lothians (list seats)	Lothian (list seats)	Edinburgh and Lothians East (list seats)	McLetchie	Ballard	Foulkes		McLetchie	Buchanan		Briggs			

=== Mid Scotland and Fife ===
Conservative Green Independent Labour Liberal Democrats Reform UK Scottish National Party

Constituency			Members										
1999–2011	2011–2026	2026–	1999	2003	05	2007	2011	12	13	14	2016	2021	2026
Dunfermline East	Cowdenbeath		Eadie							Rowley	A. Ewing		Barratt
Dunfermline West	Dunfermline		Barrie			Tolson	Walker	-->	Hilton		Somerville		
Ochil	Clackmannanshire and Dunblane		R. Simpson	Reid		K. Brown							
Fife Central	Mid Fife and Glenrothes		McLeish	May		Marwick					Gilruth		
Kirkcaldy			Livingstone				Torrance						
North East Fife		Fife North East	I. Smith				R. Campbell				Rennie		
North Tayside	Perthshire North		Swinney										
Perth	Perthshire South and Kinross-shire		Cunningham									Fairlie	
Stirling			Jackson			Crawford						Tweed	Smith
Mid Scotland and Fife			Crawford			C. Harvie	A. Ewing				Ruskell		
Mid Scotland and Fife			Marwick			Park	Baxter				Rowley		Long
Mid Scotland and Fife			Reid	Ruskell		Baker							
Mid Scotland and Fife			Raffan		Arbuckle	R. Simpson					Lockhart		McDade
Mid Scotland and Fife			Harding	Brocklebank			Rennie				A. Stewart		MacDougall
Mid Scotland and Fife			Johnston	Fraser									
Mid Scotland and Fife			Monteith			L. Smith							Kerr

=== North East Scotland ===
Conservative Green Independent Labour Liberal Democrats Reform UK Scottish National Party

Constituency			Members													
1999–2011	2011–2026	2026–	1999	01	2003	06	2007	2011	13	Jan 16	May 2016	Dec 16	17	2021	2026	26
Aberdeen Central			L. MacDonald					K. Stewart							Middleton	
Aberdeen North	Aberdeen Donside		E. Thomson		B. Adam				McDonald				-->	Dunbar		
Aberdeen South	Aberdeen South and North Kincardine	Aberdeen Deeside and North Kincardine	Stephen					Watt						Nicoll	Flynn	
Gordon	Aberdeenshire East		Radcliffe			Salmond					Martin					
West Aberdeenshire and Kincardine	Aberdeenshire West		Rumbles					Robertson			Burnett					
Angus	Angus South		Welsh					Dey							Melville	
	Angus North and Mearns		new constituency for 2011					Don			Gougeon				Black	
Banff and Buchan	Banffshire and Buchan Coast		Salmond	Stevenson										Adam		
Dundee East	Dundee City East		McAllion		Robison										Gethins	
Dundee West	Dundee City West		Maclean				FitzPatrick								Anderson	
North East Scotland (list seats)			Robison		Glen			J. Marra						M. Marra		
North East Scotland (list seats)			B. Adam		Baird		Don	L. MacDonald						Villalba	Massey	
North East Scotland (list seats)			McGugan		Baker					Brennan	R. Thomson		Mason	White	Simpson	
North East Scotland (list seats)			Lochhead			Watt		McDonald	Allard		Chapman			Golden	Chou Turvey	
North East Scotland (list seats)			Ale. Johnstone									Bowman		Lumsden		Adams
North East Scotland (list seats)			B. Wallace		Milne						L. Kerr					
North East Scotland (list seats)			D. Davidson				McInnes				Rumbles			Chapman		

=== South of Scotland (1999–2011) / South Scotland (2011–) ===
Conservative Green Independent Labour Liberal Democrats Reform UK Scottish National Party Scottish Socialist Solidarity

Constituency			Members												
1999–2011	2011–2026	2026–	1999	00	2003	05	06	2007	2011	2016	17	20	21	2021	2026
Ayr			Welsh	J. Scott										Brown	
Carrick, Cumnock and Doon Valley			Jamieson						Ingram	Freeman				Whitham	Hagmann
Clydesdale			Gillon						A. Campbell					McAllan	
Dumfries	Dumfriesshire		Murray							O. Mundell					Hoy
		East Kilbride	in Central Scotland region												Stevenson
Roxburgh and Berwickshire	Ettrick, Roxburgh and Berwickshire		Robson					Lamont			Hamilton				
Galloway and Upper Nithsdale	Galloway and West Dumfries		Morgan		Fergusson					Carson					
		Hamilton, Larkhall and Stonehouse	in Central Scotland region												A. Kerr
	Kilmarnock and Irvine Valley		in Central Scotland region						Coffey						Brown
Tweeddale, Ettrick & Lauderdale	Midlothian South, Tweeddale and Lauderdale		Jenkins		Purvis				Grahame						C. Kerr
East Lothian			Home Robertson					Gray						McLennan	in Edinburgh and Lothians East region
Cunninghame South			Oldfather						in West Scotland region						
South of Scotland (list seats)	South Scotland (list seats)		Grahame						McAlpine					Mochan	
South of Scotland (list seats)	South Scotland (list seats)		Ingram						Wheelhouse					Whitfield	Fagan
South of Scotland (list seats)	South Scotland (list seats)		Russell		Morgan				McLeod	Harper					Langan
South of Scotland (list seats)	South Scotland (list seats)		Fergusson		Byrne		-->	Russell	Brodie	Hamilton	Ballantyne	-->	-->	Hoy	Kirkwood
South of Scotland (list seats)	South Scotland (list seats)		Tosh		Ballance			A. Campbell	Beamish					Dowey	Beresford
South of Scotland (list seats)	South Scotland (list seats)		D. Mundell			Brownlee			Pearson	Smyth					Moodie
South of Scotland (list seats)	South Scotland (list seats)		Gallie					Hume		Whittle					Dunlop

=== West of Scotland (1999–2011) / West Scotland (2011–) ===
Conservative Green Independent Labour Liberal Democrats Reform UK Scottish National Party Scottish Socialist

Constituency			Members									
1999–2011	2011–2026	2026–	1999	01	2003	2007	2011	2016	20	2021	25	2026
Strathkelvin and Bearsden			Galbraith	Fitzpatrick	Turner	Whitton	McLeod	R. Mackay				Harley
Clydebank and Milngavie			McNulty				Paterson			McNair		
Dumbarton			Baillie									
Eastwood			Macintosh					Carlaw				Oswald
Paisley South	Renfrewshire South	Renfrewshire West and Levern Valley	Henry					Arthur				
Paisley North	Paisley		Alexander				G. Adam					
West Renfrewshire	Renfrewshire North and West	Renfrewshire North and Cardonald	Godman				D. Mackay		-->	Don		Campbell
Greenock and Inverclyde		Inverclyde	McNeil					McMillan				
Cunninghame North			A. Wilson			K. Gibson						
	Cunninghame South		in South of Scotland region				Burgess	Maguire				P. Gibson
West of Scotland (list seats)	West Scotland (list seats)		C. Campbell		Maxwell			Greer				
West of Scotland (list seats)	West Scotland (list seats)		Ullrich		Martin	McMillan		Macintosh		O'Kane		McKee
West of Scotland (list seats)	West Scotland (list seats)		Quinan		McFee	W. Wilson	Fee			Clark		
West of Scotland (list seats)	West Scotland (list seats)		McLeod		F. Curran	Paterson	Bibby					
West of Scotland (list seats)	West Scotland (list seats)		R. Finnie				McDougall	Greene			-->	Offord
West of Scotland (list seats)	West Scotland (list seats)		Goldie					Golden		Gosal		Smith
West of Scotland (list seats)	West Scotland (list seats)		Young		Tosh	Carlaw		Corry		Findlay		

== See also ==
- Scottish Westminster constituencies
- Senedd constituencies
- Northern Ireland Assembly constituencies
