= 2016 Scottish Parliament election =

- 5 May 2016

All 129 seats to the Scottish Parliament 65 seats needed for a majority
- Opinion polls
- Registered: 4,099,907
- Turnout: Constituency – 55.8% ▲5.3 pp Regional – 55.8% ▲5.3pp
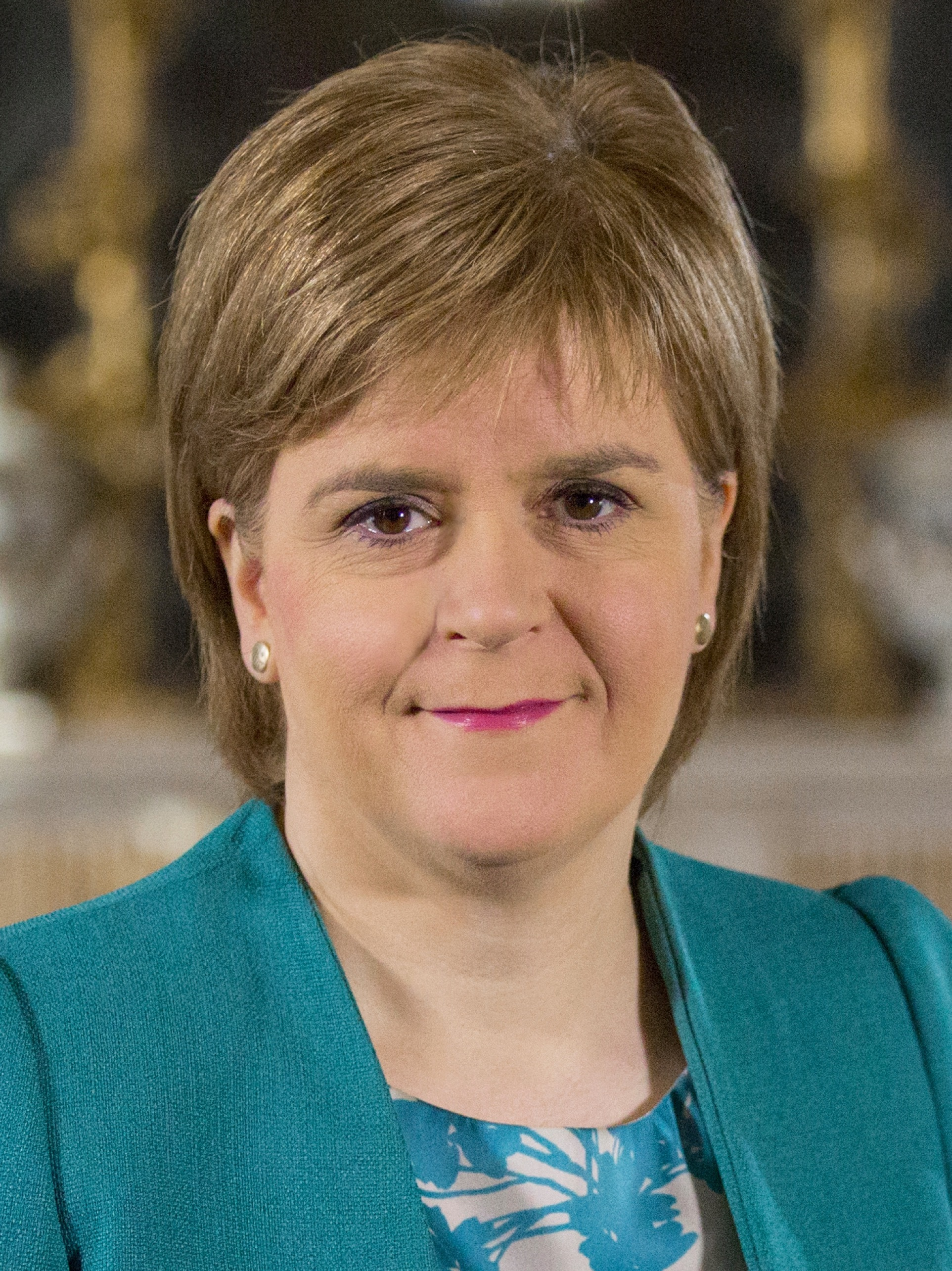

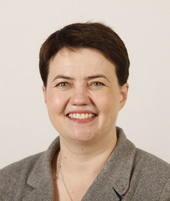

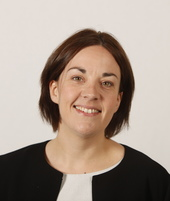

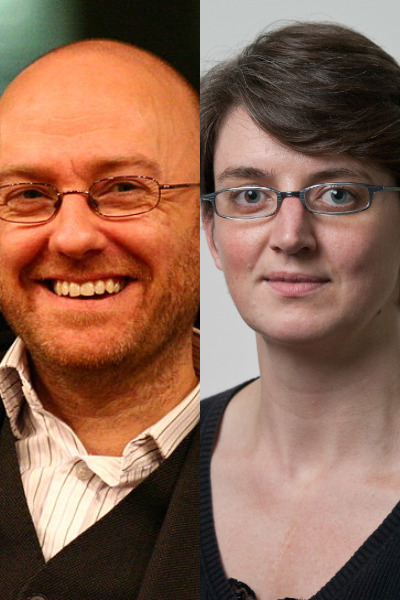

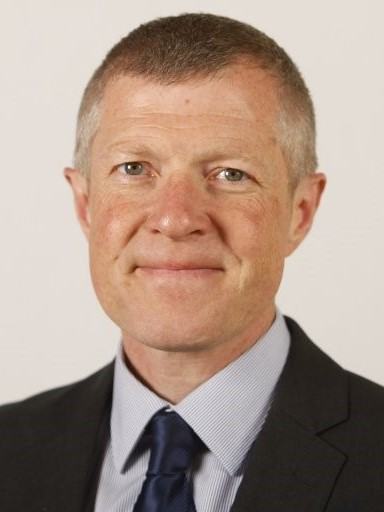
	First party	Second party	Third party
Leader	Nicola Sturgeon	Ruth Davidson	Kezia Dugdale
Party	SNP	Conservative	Labour
Leader since	14 November 2014	4 November 2011	15 August 2015
Leader's seat	Glasgow Southside	Edinburgh Central (Note: Previously MSP for Glasgow region from 2011-2016, before being elected to Edinburgh Central at this election.)	Lothian
Last election	69 seats	15 seats	37 seats (Note: Includes 11 MSPs sponsored by the Co-operative Party, who are designated Labour and Co-operative.)
Seats before	64	15	38 (Note: Includes 10 MSPs sponsored by the Co-operative Party, who are designated Labour and Co-operative.)
Seats won	63	31	24 (Note: Includes 13 MSPs sponsored by the Co-operative Party, who are designated Labour and Co-operative.)
Seat change	▼6	▲16	▼13
Constituency vote	1,059,898	501,844	514,261
% and swing	46.5% ▲1.1%	22.0% ▲8.1%	22.6% ▼9.2%
Regional vote	953,587	524,222	435,919
% and swing	41.7% ▼2.3%	22.9% ▲10.6%	19.1% ▼7.2%
	Fourth party	Fifth party
Leader	Patrick Harvie / Maggie Chapman	Willie Rennie
Party	Green	Liberal Democrats
Leader since	22 November 2008 / 25 November 2013	17 May 2011
Leader's seat	Glasgow / Ran in North East Scotland (lost)	North East Fife (Note: Previously MSP for Mid Scotland and Fife region from 2011-2016, before being elected to North East Fife at this election.)
Last election	2 seats	5 seats
Seats before	2	5
Seats won	6	5
Seat change	▲4	Steady
Constituency vote	13,172	178,238
% and swing	0.6% ▲0.6%	7.8% ▼0.1%
Regional vote	150,426	119,284
% and swing	6.6% ▲2.2%	5.2%
- The map shows the election results in single-member constituencies. The additional member MSPs in the 8 regions are shown around the map.
First Minister before election
Nicola Sturgeon
SNP
First Minister after election
Nicola Sturgeon
SNP

An election for the Scottish Parliament was held on Thursday, 5 May 2016 to elect 129 members to the Scottish Parliament. It was the fifth general election held since the devolved parliament was established in 1999. It was the first parliamentary election in Scotland in which 16 and 17 year olds were eligible to vote, under the provisions of the Scottish Elections (Reduction of Voting Age) Act (the voting age had previously been 16 in the 2014 Independence Referendum). It was also the first time the three largest parties were led by women.

Parliament went into dissolution on 24 March 2016, allowing the official period of campaigning to get underway. Five parties had MSPs in the previous parliament: Scottish National Party (SNP) led by First Minister Nicola Sturgeon, Scottish Labour led by Kezia Dugdale, Scottish Conservatives led by Ruth Davidson, Scottish Liberal Democrats led by Willie Rennie, Scottish Greens, led by their co-conveners Patrick Harvie and Maggie Chapman. Of those five parties, four changed their leader since the 2011 election.

During the campaign, a series of televised debates took place, including party leaders of the elected parties. BBC Scotland held the first leaders' debate on 24 March, STV broadcast the next on 29 March, and BBC Scotland hosted the final debate on 1 May.

The election resulted in a hung parliament with the Scottish National Party winning a third term in government, but falling two seats short of securing a second consecutive overall majority. The Conservatives saw a significant increase in support and replaced the Labour Party as the second-largest party and main opposition in the Scottish Parliament. This was the first time that Labour had finished in third place at a Scottish election in 98 years. The Scottish Greens won six seats on the regional list and overtook the Liberal Democrats, who remained on five seats.

Although the SNP had lost their majority, it was still by far the largest single party in the Scottish Parliament, with more than double the seats of the Conservatives. Accordingly, Sturgeon announced she would form a minority SNP government. She was voted in for a second term as First Minister on 17 May.

== Date ==
Under the Scotland Act 1998, an ordinary election to the Scottish Parliament would normally have been held on the first Thursday in May four years after the 2011 election, i.e. in May 2015. In May 2010, the new UK Government stated in its coalition agreement that the next general election would also be held in May 2015. This proposal was criticised by the Scottish National Party and Labour, as it had been recommended after the 2007 election that elections with different voting systems should be held on separate days: a recommendation which all of the political parties had then accepted. In response to this criticism, Deputy Prime Minister Nick Clegg offered the right to vary the date of the Scottish Parliament election by a year either way. All the main political parties then stated their support for delaying the election by a year. The Fixed-term Parliaments Act 2011, a statute of the UK Parliament, moved the date of the Scottish Parliament election to 5 May 2016.

The date of the poll may be varied by up to one month either way by the monarch, on the proposal of the Presiding Officer.

If Parliament itself resolves that it should be dissolved, with at least two-thirds of the Members (i.e. 86 Members) voting in favour, the Presiding Officer proposes a date for an extraordinary election and the Parliament is dissolved by the monarch by royal proclamation.

It does not necessarily require a two-thirds majority to precipitate an extraordinary election, because under the Scotland Act Parliament is also dissolved if it fails to nominate one of its members to be First Minister within certain time limits, irrespective of whether at the beginning or in the middle of a parliamentary term. Therefore, if the First Minister resigned, Parliament would then have 28 days to elect a successor (s46(2)b and s46(3)a). If no new First Minister was elected then the Presiding Officer would ask for Parliament to be dissolved under s3(1)a. This process could also be triggered if the First Minister lost a vote of confidence by a simple majority (i.e. more than 50%), as they must then resign (Scotland Act 1998 s45(2)). To date the Parliament has never held a vote of no confidence in a First Minister.

No extraordinary elections have been held to date. Any extraordinary elections would be in addition to ordinary elections, unless held less than six months before the due date of an ordinary election, in which case they supplant it. The subsequent ordinary election reverts to the first Thursday in May, a multiple of four years after 1999.

It was envisaged that the election would still have taken place as scheduled if Scotland had voted in favour of independence in 2014.

== Retiring MSPs ==
Constituency/Region	Departing MSP	Party
Edinburgh Central	Marco Biagi	Scottish National Party
Cunninghame South	Margaret Burgess	Scottish National Party
Caithness, Sutherland and Ross	Rob Gibson	Scottish National Party
Carrick, Cumnock and Doon Valley	Adam Ingram	Scottish National Party
Edinburgh Eastern	Kenny MacAskill	Scottish National Party
Strathkelvin and Bearsden	Fiona McLeod	Scottish National Party
Aberdeenshire East	Alex Salmond	Scottish National Party
Skye, Lochaber and Badenoch	Dave Thompson	Scottish National Party
North East Scotland	Richard Baker	Scottish Labour
Edinburgh Northern and Leith	Malcolm Chisholm	Scottish Labour
Renfrewshire South	Hugh Henry	Scottish Labour
West Scotland	Margaret McDougall	Scottish Labour
Greenock and Inverclyde	Duncan McNeil	Scottish Labour
South Scotland	Graeme Pearson	Scottish Labour
Mid Scotland and Fife	Richard Simpson	Scottish Labour
Glasgow	Drew Smith	Scottish Labour
Lothian	Gavin Brown	Scottish Conservatives
Lothian	Cameron Buchanan	Scottish Conservatives
Galloway and West Dumfries	Alex Fergusson	Scottish Conservatives
West Scotland	Annabel Goldie	Scottish Conservatives
Highlands and Islands	Jamie McGrigor	Scottish Conservatives
North East Scotland	Nanette Milne	Scottish Conservatives
Highlands and Islands	Mary Scanlon	Scottish Conservatives
Mid Fife and Glenrothes	Tricia Marwick	Presiding Officer

=== Deselected MSPs ===
Changes to the SNP's selection procedures the previous year in order to ensure gender balance of candidates meant that any incumbent constituency MSP who chose to retire would have their replacement selected from an all-woman shortlist. The only ways for a new male candidate to receive a constituency nomination would be to stand in a constituency currently held by an opposition MSP or to run a de-selection campaign against a sitting MSP. For that reason there were far more challenges than normal within the SNP, but only two were successful:

Constituency	Selected candidate	Deselected MSP	Party	Retained position on regional list
Angus North and Mearns	Mairi Evans	Nigel Don	Scottish National Party	Yes (North East Scotland)
Edinburgh Western	Toni Giugliano	Colin Keir	Scottish National Party	No

== Election system, seats, and regions ==
The total number of Members of the Scottish Parliament (MSPs) elected to the Parliament is 129.

The First Periodical Review of the Scottish Parliament's constituencies and regions by the Boundary Commission for Scotland, was announced on 3 July 2007. The Commission published its provisional proposals for the regional boundaries in 2009.

The Scottish Parliament uses an Additional Members System, designed to produce approximate proportional representation for each region. There are 8 regions, each sub-divided into smaller constituencies. There are a total of 73 constituencies. Each constituency elects one MSP by the plurality (first past the post) system of election. Each region elects 7 additional MSPs using an additional member system. A modified D'Hondt method, using the constituency results, is used to elect these additional MSPs.

The Scottish Parliament constituencies have not been coterminous with Scottish Westminster constituencies since the 2005 general election, when the 72 former UK Parliament constituencies were replaced with a new set of 59, generally larger, constituencies (see Scottish Parliament (Constituencies) Act 2004). The boundaries used for the Scottish Parliament elections were then revised for the 2011 election. The Boundary Commission also recommended changes to the electoral regions used to elect "list" members of the Scottish Parliament, which were also implemented in 2011.

== Campaign ==
On 29 February 2016, BBC Scotland's Scotland 2016 current affairs programme held a debate focusing on education featuring the Education Minister Angela Constance and three party leaders: Kezia Dugdale, Ruth Davidson and Willie Rennie.

On 24 March 2016, BBC Scotland held a debate in Glasgow which was televised that featured Dugdale, Davidson, Rennie, Nicola Sturgeon, Patrick Harvie and David Coburn.

On 29 March 2016, STV hosted a televised leaders' debate, featuring the five leaders of the parties which held seats in the last Parliament.

From 5–26 April 2016, Scotland 2016 also held a series of weekly subject debates on Tuesday nights. The subjects were Tax, Health, Energy & Environment, and Housing. Of these, six parties (SNP, Labour, Conservatives and Liberal Democrats, the Scottish Greens and UKIP) were invited to the Tax debate.

== Parties contesting the election ==
The official nomination period closed on 1 April 2016, lists of candidates were then published by local councils once the applications had been processed.

In March 2015, the Scottish Greens balloted their members to select candidates for their regional lists. The SNP released their regional candidate list in October 2015. The Conservative regional candidate list followed in December. In January 2016, RISE – Scotland's Left Alliance announced list candidates for all regions except the North East. Labour had announced a new selection process for regional candidates in November 2013, then revealed their full list of regional candidates in February 2016. UKIP's regional candidates were picked by their executive committee, prompting one prospective candidate to resign his party membership.

=== Contesting constituency and regional ballot ===
The SNP, the Scottish Labour, the Scottish Conservatives and the Scottish Liberal Democrats fielded candidates in all 73 constituencies.

- Scottish National Party (SNP)
- Scottish Labour
- Scottish Conservatives
- Scottish Liberal Democrats
- Scottish Greens – contesting all regions and Coatbridge and Chryston, Edinburgh Central and Glasgow Kelvin constituencies.
- Scottish Libertarian Party − contesting West of Scotland, Mid Scotland Fife, North East Scotland region only and Edinburgh Central constituency

=== Contesting regional ballot only ===
- Clydesdale and South Scotland Independent – contesting South Scotland
- Communist Party – contesting North East Scotland
- National Front – contesting North East Scotland only
- RISE – Respect, Independence, Socialism and Environmentalism – contesting all regions
- Scottish Christian Party "Proclaiming Christ’s Lordship" – contesting Highlands and Islands and North East
- Solidarity – Scotland's Socialist Movement – contesting all regions
- UK Independence Party – contesting all regions
- Women's Equality Party – contesting Lothian and Glasgow

=== Contesting constituency ballot only ===
- Trade Unionist and Socialist Coalition (TUSC): Glasgow Cathcart, Glasgow Pollok, Glasgow Shettleston, Renfrewshire North and West, Dundee City East and Dundee City West
- Independent candidates

== Opinion polling ==
The chart shows the relative state of the parties since polling began from 2012, until the date of the election. The constituency vote is shown as semi-transparent lines, while the regional vote is shown in full lines.

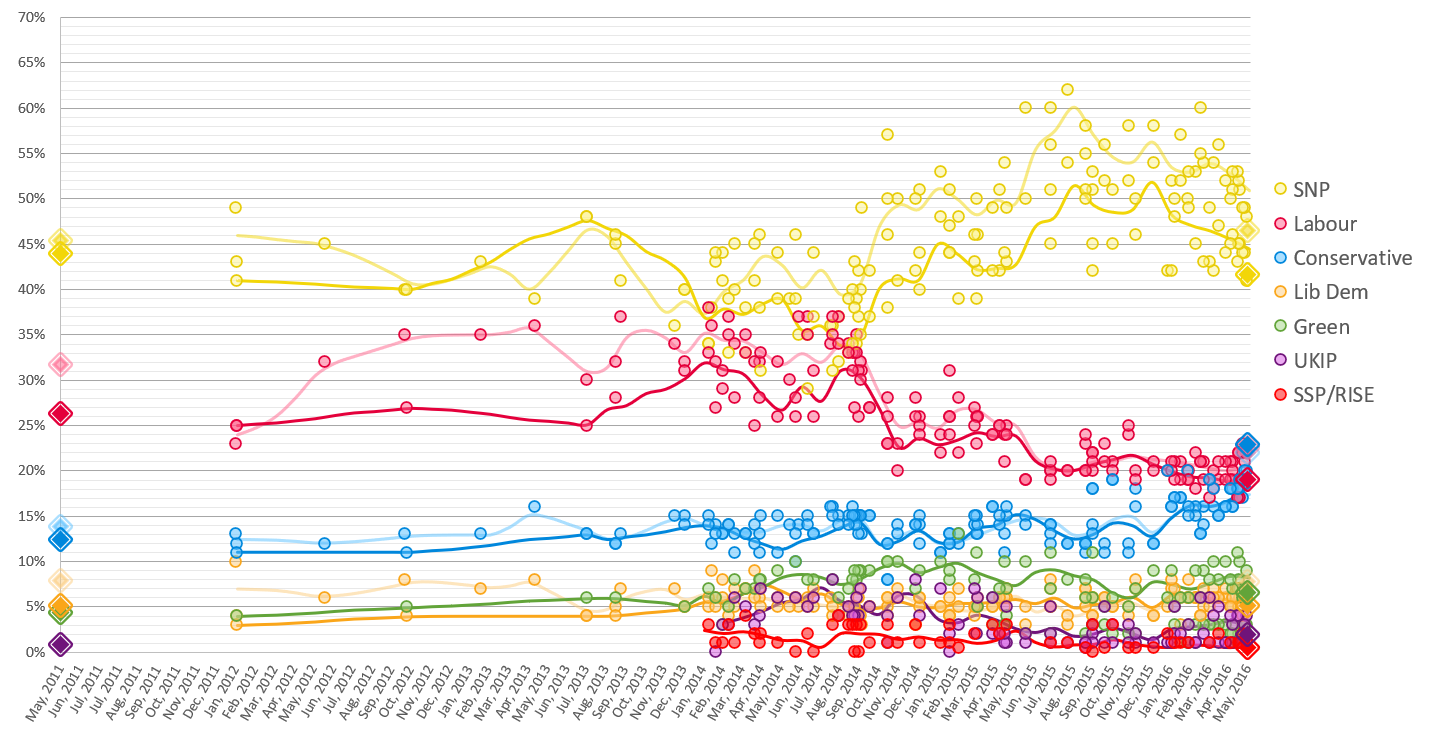
Average 30 day trend line of poll results for the 2016 Scottish Parliament election. Results from 29 January 2012 to 4 May 2016

== Result ==
Election result with constituency names labeled

Party	Constituency				Regional				Total seats	+/–
Party	Votes	%	+/–	Seats	Votes	%	+/–	Seats	Total seats	+/–
Scottish National Party	1,059,898	46.50	+1.11	59	953,587	41.72	–2.30	4	63	–6
Conservatives	501,844	22.02	+8.11	7	524,222	22.93	+10.58	24	31	+16
Labour	514,261	22.56	–9.13	3	435,919	19.07	–7.22	21	24	–13
Greens	13,172	0.58	+0.58	0	150,426	6.58	+2.21	6	6	+4
Liberal Democrats	178,238	7.82	–0.11	4	119,284	5.22	+0.02	1	5	0
UK Independence Party					46,426	2.03	+1.12	0	0	0
Solidarity					14,333	0.63	+0.49	0	0	0
Scottish Christian Party	1,162	0.05	–0.01	0	11,686	0.51	–0.32	0	0	0
RISE – Scotland's Left Alliance					10,911	0.48	New	0	0	New
Women's Equality Party					5,968	0.26	New	0	0	New
British Unionist Party					2,453	0.11	New	0	0	New
Clydesdale and South Scotland Independent	909	0.04	New	0	1,485	0.06	New	0	0	New
Animal Welfare Party					1,819	0.08	New	0	0	New
Scottish Libertarian Party	119	0.01	New	0	1,686	0.07	New	0	0	New
National Front					617	0.03	–0.01	0	0	0
Communist Party of Britain					510	0.02	New	0	0	0
Trade Unionist and Socialist Coalition	3,540	0.16	New	0					0	New
Independents	6,011	0.26	–0.36	0	4,420	0.19	–0.99	0	0	–1
Total	2,279,154	100.00	–	73	2,285,752	100.00	–	56	129	0
Valid votes	2,279,154	99.60			2,285,752	99.83				
Invalid/blank votes	9,215	0.40			3,812	0.17				
Total votes	2,288,369	100.00			2,289,564	100.00				
Registered voters/turnout	4,099,907	55.82			4,099,907	55.84				
Source: Scottish Parliament

=== Votes summary ===
Popular Vote (Constituency)
SNP	46.5%
Labour	22.6%
Conservative	22.0%
Liberal Democrats	7.8%
Green	0.6%
Other	0.5%

Popular Vote (Regional)
SNP	41.7%
Conservative	22.9%
Labour	19.1%
Green	6.6%
Liberal Democrats	5.2%
UKIP	2.0%
Other	2.5%

Parliament seats
SNP	48.8%
Conservative	24.0%
Labour	18.6%
Green	4.7%
Liberal Democrats	3.9%

=== Central Scotland ===
Scottish Parliament election, 2016: Central Scotland
Constituency	Elected member	Result
Airdrie and Shotts	Alex Neil	SNP hold
Coatbridge and Chryston	Fulton MacGregor	SNP gain from Labour
Cumbernauld and Kilsyth	Jamie Hepburn	SNP hold
East Kilbride	Linda Fabiani	SNP hold
Falkirk East	Angus MacDonald	SNP hold
Falkirk West	Michael Matheson	SNP hold
Hamilton, Larkhall and Stonehouse	Christina McKelvie	SNP hold
Motherwell and Wishaw	Clare Adamson	SNP gain from Labour
Uddingston and Bellshill	Richard Lyle	SNP gain from Labour

Scottish parliamentary election, 2016: Central Scotland
Party	Elected candidates	Seats	+/−	Votes	%	+/−%
SNP		0	-3	129,082	47.7	+1.3
Labour	Richard Leonard; Monica Lennon; Mark Griffin; Elaine Smith	4	+1	67,103	24.8	-10.5
Conservative	Margaret Mitchell; Graham Simpson; Alison Harris	3	+2	43,602	16.1	+9.7
Green		0	0	12,722	4.7	+2.3

=== Glasgow ===
Scottish Parliament election, 2016: Glasgow
Constituency	Elected member	Result
Glasgow Anniesland	Bill Kidd	SNP hold
Glasgow Cathcart	James Dornan	SNP hold
Glasgow Kelvin	Sandra White	SNP hold
Glasgow Maryhill and Springburn	Bob Doris	SNP gain from Labour
Glasgow Pollok	Humza Yousaf	SNP gain from Labour
Glasgow Provan	Ivan McKee	SNP gain from Labour
Glasgow Shettleston	John Mason	SNP hold
Glasgow Southside	Nicola Sturgeon	SNP hold
Rutherglen	Clare Haughey	SNP gain from Labour

Scottish parliamentary election, 2016: Glasgow
Party	Elected candidates	Seats	+/−	Votes	%	+/−%
SNP		0	-2	111,101	44.8	+4.9
Labour	Anas Sarwar; Johann Lamont; James Kelly; Pauline McNeill	4	+1	59,151	23.8	-11.1
Conservative	Adam Tomkins; Annie Wells	2	+1	29,533	11.9	+5.8
Green	Patrick Harvie	1	±0	23,398	9.4	+3.5

=== Highlands and Islands ===
Scottish Parliament election, 2016: Highlands and Islands
Constituency	Elected member	Result
Argyll and Bute	Michael Russell	SNP hold
Caithness, Sutherland and Ross	Gail Ross	SNP hold
Inverness and Nairn	Fergus Ewing	SNP hold
Moray	Richard Lochhead	SNP hold
Na h-Eileanan an Iar	Alasdair Allan	SNP hold
Orkney	Liam McArthur	Liberal Democrats hold
Shetland	Tavish Scott	Liberal Democrats hold
Skye, Lochaber and Badenoch	Kate Forbes	SNP hold

Scottish Parliament election, 2016: Highlands and Islands
Party	Elected candidates	Seats	+/−	Votes	%	+/−%
SNP	Maree Todd	1	-2	81,600	39.7	-7.8
Conservative	Douglas Ross; Edward Mountain; Donald Cameron	3	+1	44,693	21.8	+10.1
Liberal Democrats		0	±0	27,223	13.3	+1.1
Labour	Rhoda Grant; David Stewart	2	±0	22,894	11.2	-3.3
Green	John Finnie	1	+1	14,781	7.2	+2.1

=== Lothian ===
Scottish Parliament election, 2016: Lothian
Constituency	Elected member	Result
Almond Valley	Angela Constance	SNP hold
Edinburgh Central	Ruth Davidson	Conservative gain from SNP
Edinburgh Eastern	Ash Denham	SNP hold
Edinburgh Northern and Leith	Ben Macpherson	SNP gain from Labour
Edinburgh Pentlands	Gordon MacDonald	SNP hold
Edinburgh Southern	Daniel Johnson	Labour gain from SNP
Edinburgh Western	Alex Cole-Hamilton	Liberal Democrats gain from SNP
Linlithgow	Fiona Hyslop	SNP hold
Midlothian North and Musselburgh	Colin Beattie	SNP hold

Scottish Parliament election, 2016: Lothian
Party	Elected candidates	Seats	+/−	Votes	%	+/−%
SNP		0	0	118,546	36.2	-2.9
Conservative	Miles Briggs; Gordon Lindhurst; Jeremy Balfour	3	+1	74,972	22.9	+11.3
Labour	Kezia Dugdale; Neil Findlay	2	-1	67,991	20.8	-4.1
Green	Alison Johnstone; Andy Wightman	2	+1	34,551	10.6	+3.0
Independent		0	-1	—	—	-6.6

Margo MacDonald had been elected on the Lothian regional list in 2011, as an independent; she died in 2014.

=== Mid Scotland and Fife ===
Scottish Parliament election, 2016: Mid Scotland and Fife
Constituency	Elected member	Result
Clackmannanshire and Dunblane	Keith Brown	SNP hold
Cowdenbeath	Annabelle Ewing	SNP gain from Labour
Dunfermline	Shirley-Anne Somerville	SNP hold
Kirkcaldy	David Torrance	SNP hold
Mid Fife and Glenrothes	Jenny Gilruth	SNP hold
North East Fife	Willie Rennie	Liberal Democrats gain from SNP
Perthshire North	John Swinney	SNP hold
Perthshire South and Kinross-shire	Roseanna Cunningham	SNP hold
Stirling	Bruce Crawford	SNP hold

Scottish Parliament election, 2016: Mid Scotland and Fife
Party	Elected candidates	Seats	+/−	Votes	%	+/−%
SNP		0	-1	120,128	41.3	-3.9
Conservative	Murdo Fraser; Liz Smith; Alexander Stewart; Dean Lockhart	4	+2	73,293	25.2	+11.0
Labour	Claire Brennan-Baker; Alex Rowley	2	-1	51,373	17.6	-7.4
Liberal Democrats		0	-1	20,401	7.0	+1.2
Green	Mark Ruskell	1	+1	17,860	6.1	+1.9

=== North East Scotland ===
Scottish Parliament election, 2016: North East Scotland
Constituency	Elected member	Result
Aberdeen Central	Kevin Stewart	SNP hold
Aberdeen Donside	Mark McDonald	SNP hold
Aberdeen South & North Kincardine	Maureen Watt	SNP hold
Aberdeenshire East	Gillian Martin	SNP hold
Aberdeenshire West	Alexander Burnett	Conservative gain from SNP
Angus North & Mearns	Mairi Evans	SNP hold
Angus South	Graeme Dey	SNP hold
Banffshire & Buchan Coast	Stewart Stevenson	SNP hold
Dundee City East	Shona Robison	SNP hold
Dundee City West	Joe Fitzpatrick	SNP hold

Scottish Parliament election, 2016: North East Scotland
Party	Elected candidates	Seats	+/−	Votes	%	+/−%
SNP		0	-1	137,086	44.7	-8.1
Conservative	Alex Johnstone; Ross Thomson; Peter Chapman; Liam Kerr	4	+2	85,848	28.0	+13.9
Labour	Jenny Marra; Lewis MacDonald	2	-1	38,791	12.6	-3.8
Liberal Democrats	Mike Rumbles	1	±0	18,444	6.0	-0.8
Green		0	±0	15,123	4.9	+1.0

=== South Scotland ===
Scottish Parliament election, 2016: South Scotland
Constituency	Elected member	Result
Ayr	John Scott	Conservative hold
Carrick, Cumnock and Doon Valley	Jeane Freeman	SNP hold
Clydesdale	Aileen Campbell	SNP hold
Dumfriesshire	Oliver Mundell	Conservative gain from Labour
East Lothian	Iain Gray	Labour hold
Ettrick, Roxburgh and Berwickshire	John Lamont	Conservative hold
Galloway and West Dumfries	Finlay Carson	Conservative hold
Kilmarnock and Irvine Valley	Willie Coffey	SNP hold
Midlothian South, Tweeddale and Lauderdale	Christine Grahame	SNP hold

Scottish Parliament election, 2016: South Scotland
Party	Elected candidates	Seats	+/−	Votes	%	+/−%
SNP	Joan McAlpine; Emma Harper; Paul Wheelhouse	3	-1	120,217	38.3	-2.7
Conservative	Rachael Hamilton; Brian Whittle	2	+2	100,753	32.1	+12.6
Labour	Claudia Beamish; Colin Smyth	2	0	56,072	17.8	-7.5
Green		0	0	14,773	4.7	+1.6
Liberal Democrats		0	-1	11,775	3.7	-1.7

=== West Scotland ===
Scottish Parliament election, 2016: West Scotland
Constituency	Elected member	Result
Clydebank and Milngavie	Gil Paterson	SNP hold
Cunninghame North	Kenneth Gibson	SNP hold
Cunninghame South	Ruth Maguire	SNP hold
Dumbarton	Jackie Baillie	Labour hold
Eastwood	Jackson Carlaw	Conservative gain from Labour
Greenock and Inverclyde	Stuart McMillan	SNP gain from Labour
Paisley	George Adam	SNP hold
Renfrewshire North and West	Derek Mackay	SNP hold
Renfrewshire South	Tom Arthur	SNP gain from Labour
Strathkelvin and Bearsden	Rona Mackay	SNP hold

Scottish Parliament election, 2016: West Scotland
Party	Elected candidates	Seats	+/−	Votes	%	+/−%
SNP		0	-2	135,827	42.2	+0.6
Labour	Mary Fee; Neil Bibby; Ken Macintosh	3	±0	72,544	22.5	-10.2
Conservative	Jamie Greene; Maurice Golden; Maurice Corry	3	+1	71,528	22.2	+9.5
Green	Ross Greer	1	+1	17,218	5.3	+2.4

== Target seats ==
Below are listed all the constituencies which required a swing of less than 5% from the 2011 result to change hands.

=== SNP targets ===
Rank	Constituency	Winning party 2011	Swing to gain	SNP's place 2011	Result
1	East Lothian	Labour	0.24	2nd	Labour Hold
2	Greenock & Inverclyde	Labour	0.91	2nd	SNP Gain
3	Edinburgh Northern & Leith	Labour	0.97	2nd	SNP Gain
4	Motherwell & Wishaw	Labour	1.21	2nd	SNP Gain
5	Uddingston & Bellshill	Labour	1.43	2nd	SNP Gain
6	Galloway & West Dumfries	Conservative	1.44	2nd	Conservative Hold
7	Ayr	Conservative	1.67	2nd	Conservative Hold
8	Glasgow Pollok	Labour	1.36	2nd	SNP Gain
9	Cowdenbeath	Labour	2.43	2nd	SNP Gain
10	Dumbarton	Labour	2.87	2nd	Labour Hold
11	Glasgow Maryhill & Springburn	Labour	3.15	2nd	SNP Gain
12	Rutherglen	Labour	3.28	2nd	SNP Gain
13	Renfrewshire South	Labour	4.81	2nd	SNP Gain

=== Labour targets ===
Rank	Constituency	Winning party 2011	Swing to gain	Labour's place 2011	Result
1	Glasgow Anniesland	SNP	0.02	2nd	SNP Hold
2	Kirkcaldy	SNP	0.33	2nd	SNP Hold
3	Edinburgh Central	SNP	0.41	2nd	Conservative Gain
4	Paisley	SNP	0.49	2nd	SNP Hold
5	Edinburgh Southern	SNP	1.03	2nd	Labour Gain
6	Aberdeen Central	SNP	1.23	2nd	SNP Hold
7	Clydebank & Milngavie	SNP	1.26	2nd	SNP Hold
8	Glasgow Shettleston	SNP	1.39	2nd	SNP Hold
9	Glasgow Kelvin	SNP	1.80	2nd	SNP Hold
10	Strathkelvin & Bearsden	SNP	2.67	2nd	SNP Hold
11	Renfrewshire North & West	SNP	2.85	2nd	SNP Hold
12	Glasgow Cathcart	SNP	3.04	2nd	SNP Hold
13	East Kilbride	SNP	3.26	2nd	SNP Hold
14	Edinburgh Eastern	SNP	3.64	2nd	SNP Hold
15	Airdrie and Shotts	SNP	4.19	2nd	SNP Hold
16	Hamilton, Larkhall & Stonehouse	SNP	4.37	2nd	SNP Hold
17	Carrick, Cumnock & Doon Valley	SNP	4.50	2nd	SNP Hold

=== Conservative targets ===
Rank	Constituency	Winning party 2011	Swing to gain	Con place 2011	Result
1	Edinburgh Pentlands	SNP	2.93	2nd	SNP Hold
2	Eastwood	Labour	3.16	2nd	Conservative Gain
3	Dumfriesshire	Labour	4.97	2nd	Conservative Gain

=== Liberal Democrat targets ===
Rank	Constituency	Winning party 2011	Swing to gain	LD's place 2011	Result
1	Edinburgh Southern	SNP	2.45	3rd	Labour Gain
2	Edinburgh Western	SNP	4.02	2nd	Lib Dem Gain
3	North East Fife	SNP	4.37	2nd	Lib Dem Gain

== Incumbents defeated ==
Constituency/Region	MSP	Party	MSP Since	Office previously held
Uddingston and Bellshill	Michael McMahon	Labour	1999	Shadow Minister for Community
Central Scotland	Siobhan McMahon	Labour	2011	Shadow Minister for Public Services and Wealth Creation
Central Scotland	Margaret McCulloch	Labour	2011	
Motherwell, Wishaw and Hamilton	John Pentland	Labour	2011	Shadow Minister for Opportunity
Glasgow Maryhill and Springburn	Patricia Ferguson	Labour	1999	
Glasgow Provan	Paul Martin	Labour	1999	
Glasgow	Hanzala Malik	Labour	2011	
Glasgow	Anne McTaggart	Labour	2011	Shadow Minister for Democracy
Lothian	Sarah Boyack	Labour	1999	Spokesperson for Environmental Justice
Dunfermline	Cara Hilton	Labour	2013	Shadow Minister for Opportunity
Mid Scotland and Fife	Jayne Baxter	Labour	2012	Shadow Minister for Community
Dumfriesshire	Elaine Murray	Labour	1999	Shadow Minister for Justice
North East Scotland	Lesley Brennan	Labour	2016	
Highlands and Islands	Mike MacKenzie	Scottish National Party	2011	
North East Fife	Roderick Campbell	Scottish National Party	2011	
Edinburgh Southern	Jim Eadie	Scottish National Party	2011	
Aberdeenshire West	Dennis Robertson	Scottish National Party	2011	
Angus North and Mearns (stood for North East Scotland)	Nigel Don	Scottish National Party	2007	Convener of the Scottish Parliament Delegated Powers and Law Reform Committee
North East Scotland	Christian Allard	Scottish National Party	2013	
South Scotland	Aileen McLeod	Scottish National Party	2011	Minister for Environment, Climate Change and Land Reform
South Scotland	Chic Brodie	Scottish National Party	2011	
West Scotland	Stewart Maxwell	Scottish National Party	2003	Convener of the Scottish Parliament Education and Culture Committee
North East Scotland	Alison McInnes	Liberal Democrats	2007	
South Scotland	Jim Hume	Liberal Democrats	2007	
Central Scotland	John Wilson	Scottish Greens*	2007	
Highlands and Islands	Jean Urquhart	RISE*	2011	

* Formerly SNP

== See also ==
=== Other elections in the UK being held on the same day ===
- 2016 London Assembly election
- 2016 London mayoral election
- 2016 National Assembly for Wales election
- 2016 Northern Ireland Assembly election
- 2016 United Kingdom local elections

==== UK parliamentary by-elections ====
- 2016 Ogmore by-election
- 2016 Sheffield Brightside and Hillsborough by-election
