= Lothian (Scottish Parliament electoral region) =

Scottish Parliament region

- Former electoral region for the Scottish Parliament
- Lothian shown within Scotland
- Council areas: City of Edinburgh; East Lothian (part); Midlothian (part); West Lothian
- Population: 786,439 (2019)

Former electoral region
- Created: 2011
- Abolished: 2026
- MSPs: Scottish National Party 7 Conservative 3 Labour 3 Scottish Green 2 Liberal Democrats 1
- Constituencies: Almond Valley; Edinburgh Central; Edinburgh Eastern; Edinburgh Northern and Leith; Edinburgh Pentlands; Edinburgh Southern; Edinburgh Western; Linlithgow; Midlothian North and Musselburgh
- Created from: Lothians
- Replaced by: Edinburgh and Lothians East

Lothian was one of the eight electoral regions of the Scottish Parliament. Nine of the parliament's 73 first past the post constituencies were sub-divisions of the region and it elected seven of the 56 additional-member Members of the Scottish Parliament (MSPs). Thus it elected a total of 16 MSPs. The region was located in the eastern area of the Central Belt of the Scottish Lowlands and was anchored by capital city of Scotland, Edinburgh.

The Lothian region was created as a result of the First Periodic Review of Scottish Parliament Boundaries and largely replaced the Lothians region.

As a result of the Second Periodic Review of Scottish Parliament Boundaries the region will be replaced by the Edinburgh and Lothians East electoral region for the 2026 Scottish Parliament election.

== Constituencies and local government areas ==
=== Constituencies and council areas 2011–2026 ===
Boundaries of new Central Scotland region

Boundaries of former Lothians region

As a result of the First Periodic Review of Scottish Parliament Boundaries the boundaries for the region and constituencies were redrawn for the 2011 Scottish Parliament election.

Constituencies

1. Almond Valley
2. Edinburgh Central
3. Edinburgh Eastern
4. Edinburgh Northern and Leith
5. Edinburgh Pentlands
6. Edinburgh Southern
7. Edinburgh Western
8. Linlithgow
9. Midlothian North and Musselburgh

== Members of the Scottish Parliament ==
=== Constituency MSPs ===
as Lothians
| Term | Election | Midlothian | Edinburgh East and Musselburgh | Edinburgh Central | Edinburgh North and Leith | Edinburgh Pentlands | Edinburgh South | Edinburgh West | Linlithgow | Livingston |
|---|---|---|---|---|---|---|---|---|---|---|
| 1st | 1999 | Rhona Brankin (Labour) | Susan Deacon (Labour) | Sarah Boyack (Labour) | Malcolm Chisholm (Labour) | Iain Gray (Labour) | Angus MacKay (Labour) | Margaret Smith (LD) | Mary Mulligan (Labour) | Bristow Muldoon (Labour) |
| 2nd | 2003 | Rhona Brankin (Labour) | Susan Deacon (Labour) | Sarah Boyack (Labour) | Malcolm Chisholm (Labour) | David McLetchie (Conservative) | Mike Pringle (LD) | Margaret Smith (LD) | Mary Mulligan (Labour) | Bristow Muldoon (Labour) |
| 3rd | 2007 | Rhona Brankin (Labour) | Kenny MacAskill (SNP) | Sarah Boyack (Labour) | Malcolm Chisholm (Labour) | David McLetchie (Conservative) | Mike Pringle (LD) | Margaret Smith (LD) | Mary Mulligan (Labour) | Angela Constance (SNP) |
as Lothian
| Term | Election | Midlothian North and Musselburgh | Edinburgh Eastern | Edinburgh Central | Edinburgh Northern and Leith | Edinburgh Pentlands | Edinburgh Southern | Edinburgh Western | Linlithgow | Almond Valley |
| 4th | 2011 | Colin Beattie (SNP) | Kenny MacAskill (SNP) | Marco Biagi (SNP) | Malcolm Chisholm (Labour) | Gordon MacDonald (SNP) | Jim Eadie (SNP) | Colin Keir (SNP) | Fiona Hyslop (SNP) | Angela Constance (SNP) |
| 5th | 2016 | Colin Beattie (SNP) | Ash Denham (SNP) | Ruth Davidson (Conservative) | Ben Macpherson (SNP) | Gordon MacDonald (SNP) | Daniel Johnson (Labour) | Alex Cole-Hamilton (LD) | Fiona Hyslop (SNP) | Angela Constance (SNP) |
| 6th | 2021 | Colin Beattie (SNP) | Ash Denham (SNP) | Angus Robertson (SNP) | Ben Macpherson (SNP) | Gordon MacDonald (SNP) | Daniel Johnson (Labour) | Alex Cole-Hamilton (LD) | Fiona Hyslop (SNP) | Angela Constance (SNP) |

=== Regional list MSPs ===
Elections take place on a whole-region basis: candidates shown in the same column have no particular relationship to each other.

| Parliament | MSP | MSP | MSP | MSP | MSP | MSP | MSP |
as Lothians
| 1st (1999–2003) | Robin Harper (Green) | Margo MacDonald (SNP) | Fiona Hyslop (SNP) | Kenny MacAskill (SNP) | David Steel (Lib Dem) | James Douglas-Hamilton (Conservative) | David McLetchie (Conservative) |
| 1st (1999–2003) | Robin Harper (Green) | Margo MacDonald (Ind) | Fiona Hyslop (SNP) | Kenny MacAskill (SNP) | David Steel (Lib Dem) | James Douglas-Hamilton (Conservative) | David McLetchie (Conservative) |
| 2nd (2003–07) | Robin Harper (Green) | Margo MacDonald (Ind) | Fiona Hyslop (SNP) | Kenny MacAskill (SNP) | Colin Fox (Socialist) | James Douglas-Hamilton (Conservative) | Mark Ballard (Green) |
| 3rd (2007–11) | Robin Harper (Green) | Margo MacDonald (Ind) | Fiona Hyslop (SNP) | Ian McKee (SNP) | Stefan Tymkewycz (SNP) | Gavin Brown (Conservative) | George Foulkes (Labour) |
| 3rd (2007–11) | Robin Harper (Green) | Margo MacDonald (Ind) | Fiona Hyslop (SNP) | Ian McKee (SNP) | Shirley-Anne Somerville (SNP) | Gavin Brown (Conservative) | George Foulkes (Labour) |
as Lothian
| 4th (2011–16) | Alison Johnstone (Green) | Margo MacDonald (Ind)^{[a]} | Kezia Dugdale (Labour)^{[b]} | Neil Findlay (Labour) | Sarah Boyack (Labour) | Gavin Brown (Conservative) | David McLetchie (Conservative)^{[c]} |
| 4th (2011–16) | Alison Johnstone (Green) | Vacant (April 2014–May 2016) | Kezia Dugdale (Labour)^{[b]} | Neil Findlay (Labour) | Sarah Boyack (Labour) | Gavin Brown (Conservative) | Cameron Buchanan (Conservative)^{[c]} |
| 5th (2016–21) | Alison Johnstone (Green) | Andy Wightman (Green)^{[d]} | Kezia Dugdale (Labour)^{[b]} | Neil Findlay (Labour) | Gordon Lindhurst (Conservative) | Miles Briggs (Conservative) | Jeremy Balfour (Conservative) |
| 5th (2016–21) | Alison Johnstone (Green) | Andy Wightman (Ind)^{[d]} | Sarah Boyack (Labour)^{[b]} | Neil Findlay (Labour) | Gordon Lindhurst (Conservative) | Miles Briggs (Conservative) | Jeremy Balfour (Conservative) |
| 6th (2021–26) | Alison Johnstone (Green) | Lorna Slater (Green) | Sarah Boyack (Labour)^{[b]} | Foysol Choudhury (Labour) | Sue Webber (Conservative) | Miles Briggs (Conservative) | Jeremy Balfour (Conservative) |

- ^{[a]} As Margo MacDonald was elected as an independent MSP, there was no mechanism to appoint a replacement; following her death, her seat remained vacant until the Scottish Parliament general election in May 2016.
- ^{[b]} Stood down 15 July 2019, replaced by Sarah Boyack.
- ^{[c]} Upon the death of David McLetchie, he was replaced by Cameron Buchanan as the next name on the Lothian regional list for the Scottish Conservatives.
- ^{[d]} Originally sat as a Scottish Green MSP until December 2020.

== Election results ==
=== 2021 Scottish Parliament election ===
==== Constituency results ====
2021 Scottish Parliament election: Lothian
| Constituency | Elected member | Result |
|---|---|---|
| Almond Valley | Angela Constance | SNP hold |
| Edinburgh Central | Angus Robertson | SNP gain from Conservative |
| Edinburgh Eastern | Ash Denham | SNP hold |
| Edinburgh Northern and Leith | Ben Macpherson | SNP hold |
| Edinburgh Pentlands | Gordon MacDonald | SNP hold |
| Edinburgh Southern | Daniel Johnson | Labour hold |
| Edinburgh Western | Alex Cole-Hamilton | Liberal Democrats hold |
| Linlithgow | Fiona Hyslop | SNP hold |
| Midlothian North and Musselburgh | Colin Beattie | SNP hold |

==== Additional member results ====
2021 Scottish Parliament election: Lothian
| List | Candidates | Votes | Of total (%) | ± from prev. |
|---|---|---|---|---|
| SNP | Graham Campbell, Angus Robertson, Fiona Hyslop, Ben Macpherson, Catriona MacDonald, Sarah Masson, Greg McCarra, Alison Dickie, Alex Orr, Douglas Thomson, Andrew Ewen, Rob Connell | 141,478 | 35.9 | ▼0.3 |
| Conservative | Miles Briggs, Sue Webber, Jeremy Balfour, Rebecca Fraser, Malcolm Offord, Scott Douglas, Gordon Lindhurst, Marie-Clair Munro, Graham Hutchison, Iain Whyte, Callum Laidlaw, Charles Kennedy, Damian Timson | 78,595 | 19.9 | ▼3.0 |
| Labour | Daniel Johnson, Sarah Boyack, Foysol Choudhury, Maddy Kirkman, Nick Ward, Kirsteen Sullivan, Frederick Hessler, Stephen Curran | 76,689 | 19.4 | ▼1.4 |
| Green | Alison Johnstone, Lorna Slater, Kate Nevens, Chas Booth, Steve Burgess, Alys Mumford, Emily Frood, Ben Parker, Elaine Taylor, Bill Wilson, Evelyn Weston, Alex Staniforth | 49,984 | 12.7 | ▲2.1 |
| Liberal Democrats | Alex Cole-Hamilton, Fred Mackintosh, Jill Reilly, Rebecca Bell, Sally Pattie, Fraser Graham, Caron Lindsay, Bruce Wilson, Charles Dundas | 28,433 | 7.2 | ▲1.6 |
| Alba | Kenny MacAskill, Alex Arthur, Christina Hendry, Irshad Ahmed | 6,141 | 1.6 | ▲1.6 |
| All for Unity | Charlotte Morley, Parvinder Singh, Alan Hogg, Andy Macaulay, David Hamilton, Mike Knox | 2,423 | 0.6 | ▲0.6 |
| Animal Welfare | Vivienne Moir, Gavin Ridley | 2,392 | 0.6 | ▲0.6 |
| Scottish Family | Richard Lucas, Philip Holden, Norman Colville, Gareth Kirk, Amy Ireland | 2,041 | 0.5 | ▲0.5 |
| Women's Equality | Emma Watt, David Renton, Lucy Hammond | 1,124 | 0.3 | ▼0.9 |
| Freedom Alliance | Jon Pullman, Cara Wase, Patricia McCann | 922 | 0.2 | ▲0.2 |
| Abolish the Scottish Parliament | John Leckie, David Nichol | 828 | 0.2 | ▲0.2 |
| Reform | Derek Winton, Mev Brown, Iain Morse, Lesley MacDonald | 810 | 0.2 | ▲0.2 |
| Scottish Libertarian | Tam Laird, Cameron Paterson | 689 | 0.2 | ▲0.2 |
| Communist | Matthew Waddell | 598 | 0.2 | ▲0.2 |
| Independent | Ashley Graczyk | 430 | 0.1 | ▲0.1 |
| UKIP | Donald Mackay, John Mumford, Steve Hollis, Kenneth Lowry | 420 | 0.1 | ▼1.7 |
| SDP | Alasdair Young, Neil Manson, Lawrence Edwards | 227 | 0.1 | ▲0.1 |
| Renew | Heather Astbury, Anna Freemantle-Zee | 102 | 0.0 | 0.0 |

=== 2016 Scottish Parliament election ===
In the 2016 Scottish Parliament election the region elected MSPs as follows:

- 6 Scottish National Party MSPs (all constituency members)
- 4 Conservative MSPs (one constituency member and three additional members)
- 3 Labour MSPs (one constituency member and two additional members)
- 2 Green MSPs (both additional members)
- 1 Liberal Democrats MSP (constituency member)

==== Constituency results ====
2016 Scottish Parliament election: Lothian
| Constituency | Elected member | Result |
|---|---|---|
| Almond Valley | Angela Constance | SNP hold |
| Edinburgh Central | Ruth Davidson | Conservative gain from SNP |
| Edinburgh Eastern | Ash Denham | SNP hold |
| Edinburgh Northern and Leith | Ben Macpherson | SNP gain from Labour |
| Edinburgh Pentlands | Gordon MacDonald | SNP hold |
| Edinburgh Southern | Daniel Johnson | Labour gain from SNP |
| Edinburgh Western | Alex Cole-Hamilton | Liberal Democrats gain from SNP |
| Linlithgow | Fiona Hyslop | SNP hold |
| Midlothian North and Musselburgh | Colin Beattie | SNP hold |

==== Additional member results ====
2016 Scottish Parliament election: Lothians
| Party | Elected candidates | Seats | +/− | Votes | % | +/−% |
|---|---|---|---|---|---|---|
| SNP | | 0 | ±0 | 118,546 | 36.2 | -2.9 |
| Conservative | Miles Briggs; Gordon Lindhurst; Jeremy Balfour | 3 | +1 | 74,972 | 22.9 | +11.3 |
| Labour | Kezia Dugdale; Neil Findlay | 2 | -1 | 67,991 | 20.8 | -4.1 |
| Green | Alison Johnstone; Andy Wightman | 2 | +1 | 34,551 | 10.6 | +3.0 |
| Liberal Democrats | | 0 | ±0 | 18,479 | 5.6 | +0.1 |
| UKIP | | 0 | ±0 | 5,802 | 1.8 | +1.2 |
| Women's Equality | | 0 | ±0 | 3,877 | 1.2 | +1.2 |
| RISE | | 0 | ±0 | 1,641 | 0.5 | +0.5 |
| Solidarity | | 0 | ±0 | 1,319 | 0.4 | +0.3 |

=== 2011 Scottish Parliament election ===
In the 2011 Scottish Parliament election the region elected MSPs as follows:

- 8 Scottish National Party MSPs (eight constituency members)
- 4 Labour MSPs (one constituency members and three additional member)
- 2 Conservative MSPs (two additional members)
- 1 Scottish Greens MSP (additional member)
- 1 Independent MSP (additional member)

==== Constituency results ====
2011 Scottish Parliament election: Lothian
| Constituency | Elected member | Result |
|---|---|---|
| Almond Valley | Angela Constance | SNP hold |
| Edinburgh Central | Marco Biagi | SNP gain from Labour |
| Edinburgh Eastern | Kenny MacAskill | SNP gain from Labour |
| Edinburgh Northern and Leith | Malcolm Chisholm | Labour hold |
| Edinburgh Pentlands | Gordon MacDonald | SNP gain from Conservative |
| Edinburgh Southern | Jim Eadie | SNP gain from Liberal Democrats |
| Edinburgh Western | Colin Keir | SNP gain from Liberal Democrats |
| Linlithgow | Fiona Hyslop | SNP gain from Labour |
| Midlothian North and Musselburgh | Colin Beattie | SNP gain from Labour |

==== Additional member results ====
2011 Scottish Parliament election: Lothian
| List | Candidates | Votes | Of total (%) | ± from prev. |
|---|---|---|---|---|
| SNP | Kenny MacAskill, Fiona Hyslop, Shirley-Anne Somerville, Angela Constance, George Kerevan, Colin Beattie, Alex Orr, Bill Wilson, Gordon MacDonald, Calum Cashley, Jim Eadie, Alasdair Rankin | 110,953 | 39.2 | ▲12.7 |
| Labour | Sarah Boyack, Kezia Dugdale, Neil Findlay, Ann Henderson (campaigner), Jalal Chaudry, Simon MacFadyen, James Ashe | 70,544 | 24.9 | ▼1.3 |
| Conservative | David McLetchie, Gavin Brown, Cameron Buchanan, Gordon Lindhurst, Iain Mcgill, Scott Douglas, Christopher Donnelly, Andrew Hardie, Sheila Low | 33,019 | 11.7 | ▼1.5 |
| Green | Alison Johnstone, Steve Burgess, Maggie Chapman, Peter Andrew McColl, Shonagh McEwan, Adam Ramsay, Kate Joester | 21,505 | 7.6 | ▲0.5 |
| Independent | Margo MacDonald | 18,732 | 6.6 | ±0 |
| Liberal Democrats | Margaret Smith, Alex Cole-Hamilton, Gordon Ferguson Mackenzie, John Loughton, Jacqueline Dianne Bell, Daniel Marisco Farthing, Ian James Younger | 15,588 | 5.5 | ▼7.3 |
| All Scotland Pensioners Party | Alex Lawson, David Lawson, Morag Thompson, Anna Kerr, Tommi Kerr | 3,218 | 1.1 | ▼0.3 |
| BNP | David Orr, Leanne Tracy Marshall, Kevin William Doyle, James Alexander Main | 1,978 | 0.7 | ▼0.2 |
| UKIP | Otto Inglis, Gordon Norrie, Alistair Forrest, Gavin Clark, Alastair MacIntyre | 1,822 | 0.6 | ▲0.4 |
| Labour | David Don Jacobsen; Michael Lynch; Linda Sheridan; Barbara Ann Bryan | 1,681 | 0.6 | ▼0.4 |
| Scottish Socialist | Colin Fox, Catriona Grant, Laura Bennison, Andrew McPake, Alistair Hendry, Barbara Scott | 1,183 | 0.4 | ▼0.4 |
| Scottish Christian | Abimbola Olusola Kadara, Mbuli Malanga Aime Lombaya, Bridget Johnson Mosanya, David Peter Rodney Hews | 914 | 6.6 | ±0 |
| Liberal | John Hein | 697 | 0.2 | ±0 |
| CPA | Michael Thomas McGlynn | 553 | 0.2 | ±0 |
| Solidarity | Patricia Joan Smith, Ian Drummond, Vanesa Fuertes, Willie Black, Jack Fraser, Shirley Margaret Gibb, Anne Edmonds, Adrian Stuart Cannon | 327 | 0.2 | ±0 |
| Independent | David John Hogg | 294 | 0.1 | ±0 |
| Independent | Ken O'Neill | 134 | 0.0 | ±0 |
| Independent | Mev Brown | 61 | 0.0 | ±0 |

== Footnotes ==
| Preceded by West Scotland | Constituency or Region represented by the Presiding Officer; 2021–present | Incumbent |
