= Linlithgow (Scottish Parliament constituency) =

Parliamentary constituency of Scotland

- Former county constituency for the Scottish Parliament
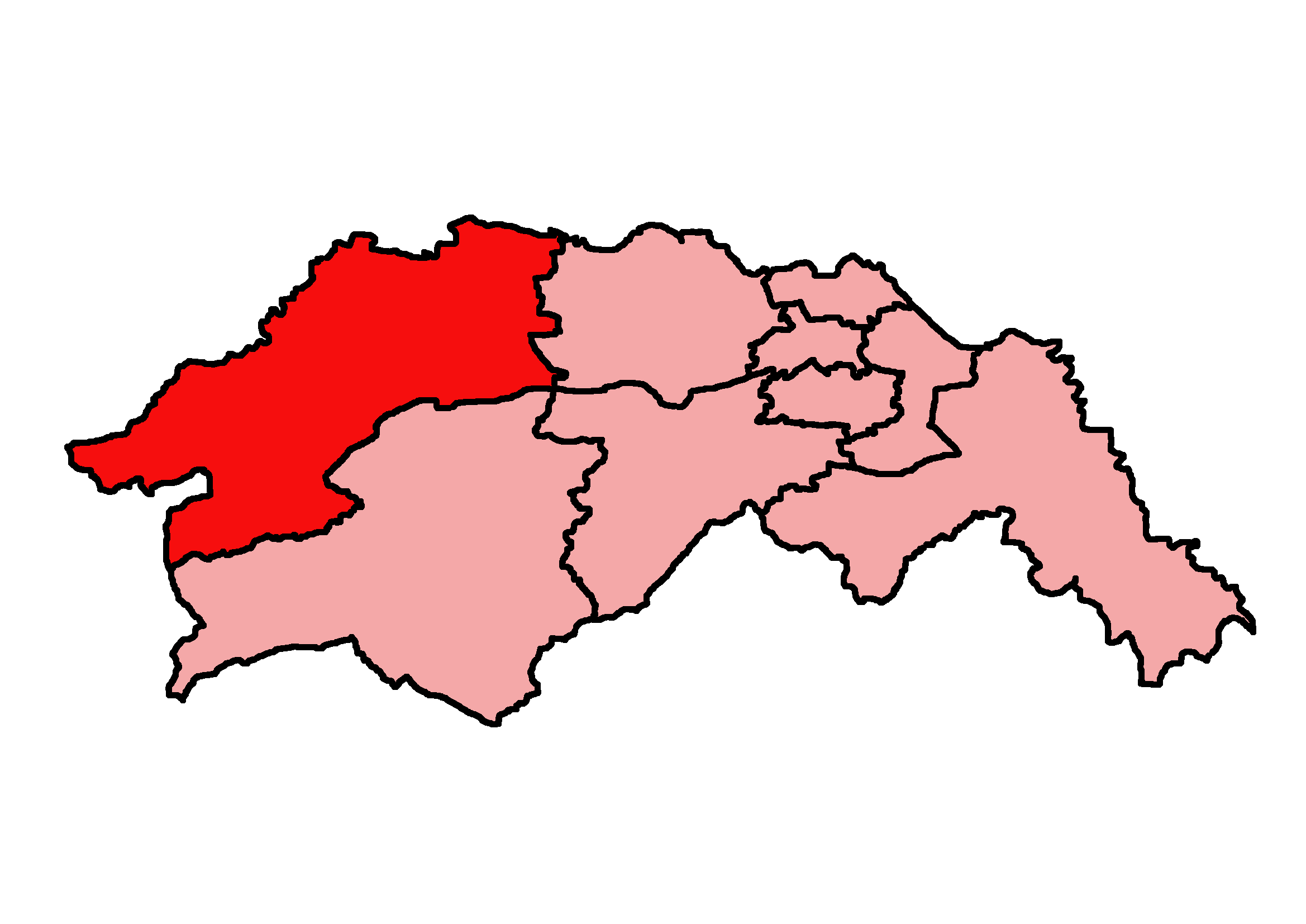

- Linlithgow shown within the Lothian electoral region and the region shown within Scotland
- Population: 95,663 (2019)

Former constituency
- Created: 1999
- Abolished: 2026
- Council area: West Lothian
- Replaced by: Bathgate, Falkirk East and Linlithgow

Linlithgow was a constituency of the Scottish Parliament covering part of the council area of West Lothian. Under the additional-member system used for elections to the Scottish Parliament, the seat elected one Member of the Scottish Parliament (MSP) by the plurality (first past the post) method of election, and was also one of nine constituencies in the Lothian electoral region, which elected seven additional members, in addition to the nine constituency MSPs, to produce a form of proportional representation for the region as a whole.

As a result of the second periodic review of Scottish Parliament boundaries in 2025, the constituency was abolished ahead of the 2026 Scottish Parliament election. Most of the area became part of the new constituency of Bathgate, however the actual town of Linlithgow was joined with areas of Falkirk to form the new seat of Falkirk East and Linlithgow.

The seat was held by Fiona Hyslop of the Scottish National Party from the 2011 Scottish Parliament election until its abolition.

== Electoral region ==
During the period the Linlithgow constituency was in existence, the other eight constituencies of the Lothian region were: Almond Valley, Edinburgh Central, Edinburgh Eastern, Edinburgh Northern and Leith, Edinburgh Pentlands, Edinburgh Southern, Edinburgh Western and Midlothian North and Musselburgh. During this period, the region included all of the City of Edinburgh council area, parts of the East Lothian council area, parts of the Midlothian council area and all of the West Lothian council area.

The Lothian electoral region was also abolished as a result of second periodic review, with the area covered now mostly forming parts of the new Edinburgh and Lothians East and Central Scotland and Lothians West regions, with a small portion also being transferred to the South Scotland region.

== Constituency boundaries and council area ==
Map of boundaries from 2011

During the period the Linlithgow constituency was in existence,the West Lothian council area was represented by two constituencies in the Scottish Parliament: Almond Valley and Linlithgow.

For the first election to the Scottish Parliament in 1999 the constituencies used were identical to those already in use for elections to the House of Commons of the United Kingdom, and thus a Scottish Parliament constituency of Linlithgow was formed which shared the name and boundaries of the Linlithgow constituency of the UK Parliament. Ahead of the 2005 United Kingdom general election the boundaries of constituencies for the House of Commons were altered, whilst being retained for elections to the Scottish Parliament. There is now no longer any link between the two sets of boundaries.

Following the first periodic review of Scottish Parliament boundaries in 2011 the Linlithgow constituency was defined using the following electoral wards of the West Lothian Council:

- In full: Armadale and Blackridge, Bathgate, Broxburn, Uphall and Winchburgh and Linlithgow
- In part: Whitburn and Blackburn (shared with Almond Valley)

As of 2019, Linlithgow's population (95,663) was the highest among the 70 Holyrood mainland constituencies, almost one-third greater than those at the bottom of the list, the lowest being Argyll and Bute which had barely 60,000 within its boundaries.

== Member of the Scottish Parliament ==
| Election | Member | Party |
|---|---|---|
| 1999 | Mary Mulligan | Labour |
| 2011 | Fiona Hyslop | SNP |

== Election results ==
=== 2020s ===
2021 Scottish Parliament election: Linlithgow
| Party | Candidate | Constituency | | | Regional | | |
| Party | Candidate | Votes | % | ±% | Votes | % | ±% |
|---|---|---|---|---|---|---|---|
| SNP | Fiona Hyslop (Note: Incumbent member for this constituency) | 22,693 | 48.4 | ▼2.0 | 18,735 | 39.8 | ▼4.2 |
| Labour | Kirsteen Sullivan | 12,588 | 26.9 | ▲0.8 | 10,135 | 21.6 | ▼1.5 |
| Conservative | Charles Kennedy | 9,472 | 20.2 | ▲0.2 | 10,556 | 22.4 | ▲1.9 |
| Green | | | | | 3,566 | 7.6 | ▲2.0 |
| Liberal Democrats | Sally Pattle | 2,126 | 4.5 | ▲1.1 | 1,551 | 3.3 | ▲0.8 |
| Alba | | | | | 724 | 1.5 | New |
| Animal Welfare | | | | | 393 | 0.8 | New |
| All for Unity | | | | | 330 | 0.7 | New |
| Scottish Family | | | | | 221 | 0.5 | New |
| Abolish the Scottish Parliament | | | | | 146 | 0.3 | New |
| Freedom Alliance (UK) | | | | | 128 | 0.3 | New |
| Reform | | | | | 120 | 0.3 | New |
| Women's Equality | | | | | 99 | 0.2 | ▼0.5 |
| Scottish Libertarian | | | | | 88 | 0.2 | New |
| UKIP | | | | | 88 | 0.2 | ▼2.4 |
| Communist | | | | | 62 | 0.1 | New |
| Independent | Ashley Graczyk | | | | 39 | 0.1 | New |
| SDP | | | | | 26 | 0.1 | New |
| Renew | | | | | 14 | 0.0 | New |
| Majority | | 10,105 | 21.5 | ▼2.8 | | | |
| Valid votes | | 46,879 | | | 47,021 | | |
| Invalid votes | | 199 | | | 91 | | |
| Turnout | | 47,078 | 62.2 | ▲8.2 | 47,112 | 62.3 | ▲8.3 |
| SNP hold | | Swing | | | | | |

=== 2010s ===
2016 Scottish Parliament election: Linlithgow
| Party | Candidate | Constituency | | | Region | | |
| Party | Candidate | Votes | % | ±% | Votes | % | ±% |
|---|---|---|---|---|---|---|---|
| SNP | Fiona Hyslop (Note: Incumbent member for this constituency) | 19,362 | 50.4 | ▲0.6 | 16,987 | 44.0 | ▼2.4 |
| Labour | Angela Moohan | 10,027 | 26.1 | ▼11.7 | 8,905 | 23.1 | ▼7.6 |
| Conservative | Charles Kennedy | 7,699 | 20.0 | ▲12.3 | 7,931 | 20.5 | ▲13.1 |
| Green | | | | | 2,179 | 5.6 | ▲2.4 |
| UKIP | | | | | 1,001 | 2.6 | ▲1.9 |
| Liberal Democrats | Dan Farthing-Sykes | 1,319 | 3.4 | ▲0.4 | 961 | 2.5 | ▲0.4 |
| Women's Equality | | | | | 269 | 0.7 | New |
| Solidarity | | | | | 248 | 0.6 | ▲0.5 |
| RISE | | | | | 133 | 0.3 | New |
| Majority | | 9,335 | 24.3 | ▲12.3 | | | |
| Valid votes | | 38,407 | | | 38,614 | | |
| Invalid votes | | 143 | | | 35 | | |
| Turnout | | 38,550 | 54.0 | ▲1.3 | 35,649 | 54.0 | ▲1.2 |
| SNP hold | | Swing | | | | | |
Notes

2011 Scottish Parliament election: Linlithgow
| Party | Candidate | Constituency | | | Region | | |
| Party | Candidate | Votes | % | ±% | Votes | % | ±% |
|---|---|---|---|---|---|---|---|
| SNP | Fiona Hyslop (Note: Incumbent member on the party list, or for another constituency) | 17,027 | 49.8 | N/A | 15,883 | 46.4 | N/A |
| Labour | Mary Mulligan (Note: Incumbent member for this constituency) | 12,936 | 37.8 | N/A | 10,517 | 30.7 | N/A |
| Conservative | Chris Donnelly | 2,646 | 7.7 | N/A | 2,524 | 7.4 | N/A |
| Independent | Margo MacDonald | | | | 1,644 | 4.8 | N/A |
| Green | | | | | 1,088 | 3.2 | N/A |
| Liberal Democrats | Jennifer Lang | 1,015 | 3.0 | N/A | 680 | 2.0 | N/A |
| National Front | Michael Coyle | 558 | 1.6 | N/A | | | |
| All-Scotland Pensioners Party | | | | | 463 | 1.4 | N/A |
| BNP | | | | | 436 | 1.3 | N/A |
| Socialist Labour | | | | | 315 | 0.9 | N/A |
| UKIP | | | | | 248 | 0.7 | N/A |
| Scottish Christian | | | | | 142 | 0.4 | N/A |
| Scottish Socialist | | | | | 127 | 0.4 | N/A |
| CPA | | | | | 78 | 0.2 | N/A |
| Liberal | | | | | 52 | 0.2 | N/A |
| Solidarity | | | | | 24 | 0.1 | N/A |
| Independent | David Hogg | | | | 9 | 0.0 | N/A |
| Independent | Ken O'Neil | | | | 8 | 0.0 | N/A |
| Independent | Mev Brown | | | | 5 | 0.0 | N/A |
| Majority | | 4,091 | 12.0 | N/A | | | |
| Valid votes | | 34,182 | | | 34,243 | | |
| Invalid votes | | 113 | | | 79 | | |
| Turnout | | 34,295 | 52.7 | N/A | 34,322 | 52.8 | N/A |
| SNP win (new boundaries) | | | | | | | |

=== 2000s ===
2007 Scottish Parliament election: Linlithgow
| Party | Candidate | Votes | % | ±% |
|---|---|---|---|---|
| Labour | Mary Mulligan | 12,715 | 42.9 | +1.1 |
| SNP | Fiona Hyslop | 11,565 | 39.0 | +4.4 |
| Conservative | Donald Cameron | 3,125 | 10.5 | −0.6 |
| Liberal Democrats | Martin Oliver | 2,232 | 7.5 | 0.0 |
| Majority | | 1,150 | 3.9 | −3.3 |
| Turnout | | 29,637 | 52.7 | +1.6 |
| Labour hold | | Swing | -3.2 | |

2003 Scottish Parliament election: Linlithgow
| Party | Candidate | Votes | % | ±% |
|---|---|---|---|---|
| Labour | Mary Mulligan | 11,548 | 41.8 | −3.3 |
| SNP | Fiona Hyslop | 9,578 | 34.6 | −1.9 |
| Conservative | Gordon Lindhurst | 3,059 | 11.1 | +1.7 |
| Liberal Democrats | Martin Oliver | 2,093 | 7.5 | −0.3 |
| Scottish Socialist | Steven Nimmo | 1,367 | 4.9 | New |
| Majority | | 1,970 | 7.2 | −1.4 |
| Turnout | | 27,645 | 51.1 | −11.2 |
| Labour hold | | Swing | -3.4 | |

=== 1990s ===
1999 Scottish Parliament election: Linlithgow
| Party | Candidate | Votes | % | ±% |
|---|---|---|---|---|
| Labour | Mary Mulligan | 15,247 | 45.1 | N/A |
| SNP | Stewart Stevenson | 12,319 | 36.5 | N/A |
| Conservative | Gordon Lindhurst | 3,158 | 9.4 | N/A |
| Liberal Democrats | John Barrett | 2,643 | 7.8 | N/A |
| Independent | Irene Overstone | 415 | 1.2 | N/A |
| Majority | | 2,928 | 8.6 | N/A |
| Turnout | | 36,710 | 62.3 | N/A |
| Labour win (new seat) | | | | |
