= Almond Valley =

Constituency of the Scottish Parliament

- County constituency for the Scottish Parliament
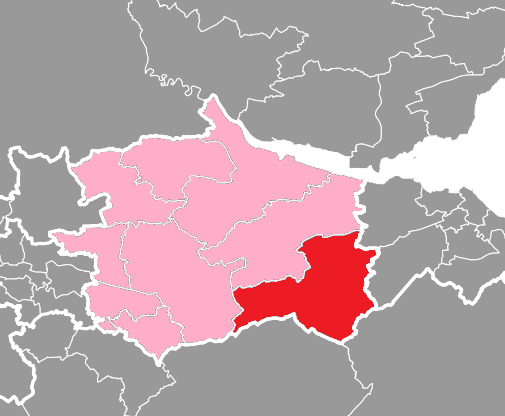

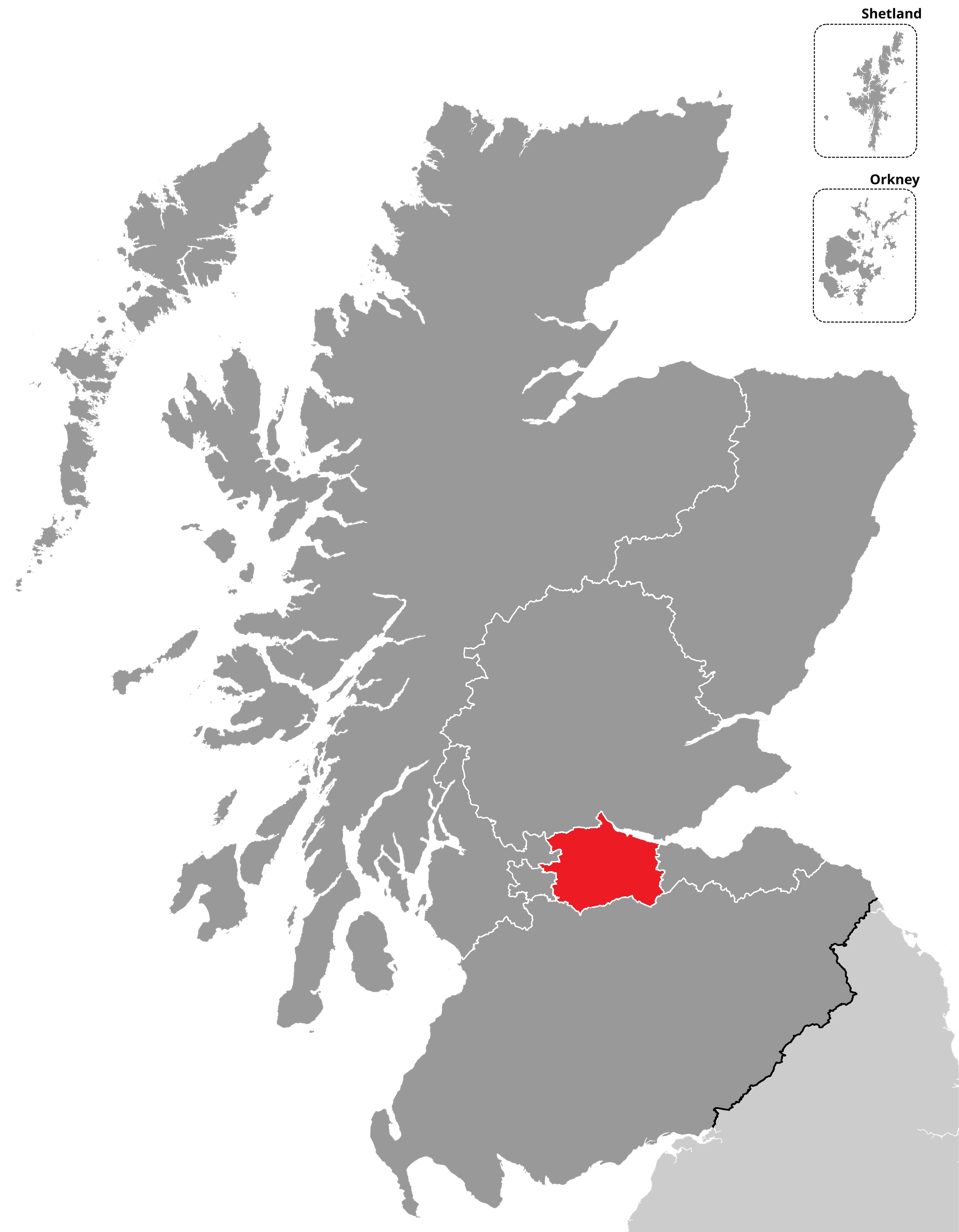
- Almond Valley shown within the Central Scotland and Lothians West electoral region, and the region shown within Scotland
- Electoral region: Central Scotland and Lothians West
- Electorate: 72,754 (2026)

Current constituency
- Created: 2011
- Party: Scottish National Party
- MSP: Angela Constance
- Council area: West Lothian

Almond Valley (Gaelic: Srath Amain) is a county constituency of the Scottish Parliament covering part of the council area of West Lothian. It elects one Member of the Scottish Parliament (MSP) by the plurality (first past the post) method of election. It is also one of nine constituencies in the Central Scotland and Lothians West electoral region, which elects seven additional members, in addition to the nine constituency MSPs, to produce a form of proportional representation for the region as a whole.

The constituency was formed for the 2011 Scottish Parliament election, covering much of the old Livingston constituency. It is named for the River Almond which flows through Livingston. Since being formed the seat has been held by Angela Constance of the Scottish National Party, who was formerly the MSP for Livingston.

== Electoral region ==
The other eight constituencies of the Central Scotland and Lothians West region are Airdrie, Bathgate, Coatbridge and Chryston, Cumbernauld and Kilsyth, Falkirk East and Linlithgow, Falkirk West, Motherwell and Wishaw, and Uddingston and Bellshill.

Prior to the second periodic review of Scottish Parliament boundaries in 2025, Almond Valley was one of nine constituencies in the Lothian electoral region. The other eight seats were Edinburgh Central, Edinburgh Eastern, Edinburgh Northern and Leith, Edinburgh Pentlands, Edinburgh Southern, Edinburgh Western, Linlithgow and Midlothian North and Musselburgh. The region included all of the City of Edinburgh council area, parts of the East Lothian council area, parts of the Midlothian council area and all of the West Lothian council area.

== Constituency boundaries and council area ==
Map of 2011-2026 boundaries

West Lothian is covered by three Scottish Parliament constituencies, Almond Valley, Bathgate and Falkirk East and Linlithgow, the latter also covering part of the Falkirk council area. When redrawn following the second review of Scottish Parliament boundaries, the following electoral wards were used to redefine the Almond Valley seat:

- In full: Livingston North, Livingston South , East Livingston and East Calder, and Fauldhouse and the Breich Valley

Under the 2011-2026 boundaries, the West Lothian council area was represented by two constituencies in the Scottish Parliament, Almond Valley and Linlithgow. The seat of Almond Valley replaced Livingston. The electoral wards of West Lothian Council used in its creation were:

- In full: East Livingston and East Calder; Fauldhouse and the Breich Valley, Livingston North; Livingston South;
- In part: Whitburn and Blackburn (shared with Linlithgow)

== Member of the Scottish Parliament ==
Election	Member	Party
2011	Angela Constance	SNP

== Election results ==
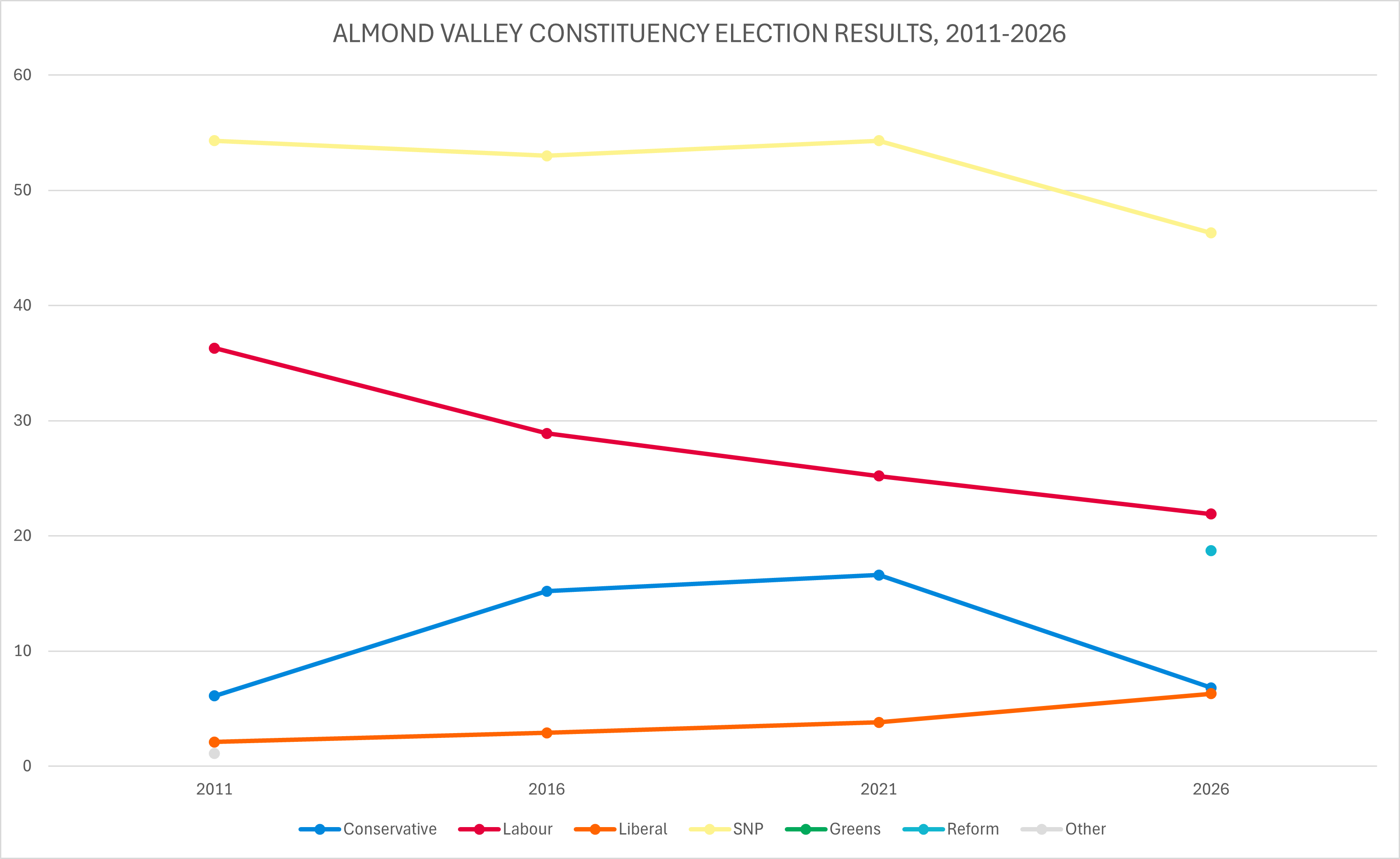
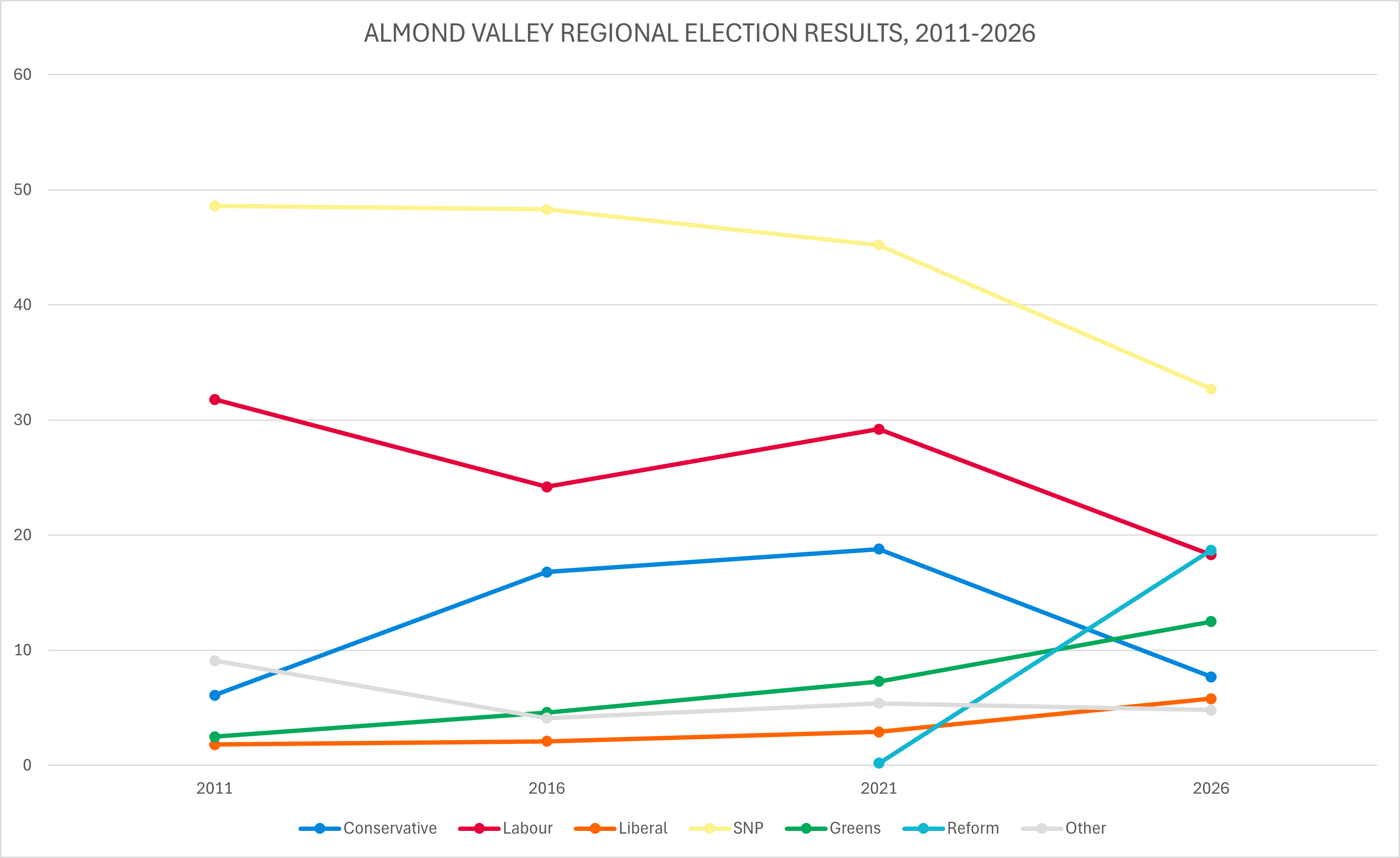

=== 2020s ===
2026 Scottish Parliament election: Almond Valley
Party	Candidate	Constituency			Regional		
Party	Candidate	Votes	%	±%	Votes	%	±%
SNP	Angela Constance (Note: Incumbent member for this constituency)	16,944	46.3	▼8.0	12,009	32.7	▼12.5
Labour	Jordan Stokoe	8,035	21.9	▼3.3	6,714	18.3	▼1.9
Reform	Malcolm Jones	6,831	18.7	New	6,855	18.7	▲18.5
Green					4,601	12.5	▲5.2
Conservative	Damian Doran-Timson	2,501	6.8	▼9.8	2,829	7.7	▼11.1
Liberal Democrats	Caron Lindsay	2,307	6.3	▲2.4	2,126	5.8	▲2.9
Independent Green Voice					392	1.1	New
Scottish Family					350	1.0	▲0.4
AtLS					244	0.7	New
ISP					207	0.6	New
Scottish Socialist					150	0.4	New
Abolish the Scottish Parliament					120	0.3	0.0
Workers Party					98	0.3	New
Advance UK					64	0.2	New
Scottish Libertarian					38	0.1	▼0.1
UKIP					25	0.1	▼0.1
Majority		8,909	24.3	▼4.8			
Valid votes		36,618			36,724		
Invalid votes		190			98		
Turnout		36,855	50.7	▼10.4	36,822	50.7	▼10.4
SNP hold		Swing					
Notes

2021 Scottish Parliament election: Almond Valley
Party	Candidate	Constituency			Regional		
Party	Candidate	Votes	%	±%	Votes	%	±%
SNP	Angela Constance (Note: Incumbent member for this constituency)	22,675	54.3	▲1.3	18,913	45.2	▼3.1
Labour	Craig Smith	10,545	25.2	▼3.7	8,474	20.2	▼4.0
Conservative	Damian Doran-Timson	6,952	16.6	▲1.4	7,861	18.8	▲2.0
Green					3,071	7.3	▲2.7
Liberal Democrats	Caron Lindsay	1,601	3.8	▲0.9	1,229	2.9	▲0.8
Alba					749	1.8	New
Animal Welfare					355	0.8	New
All for Unity					298	0.7	New
Scottish Family					243	0.6	New
Abolish the Scottish Parliament					117	0.3	New
Freedom Alliance (UK)					114	0.3	New
Reform					97	0.2	New
Women's Equality					81	0.2	▼0.5
Scottish Libertarian					77	0.2	New
UKIP					75	0.2	▼2.3
Communist					68	0.2	New
Independent	Ashley Graczyk				25	0.1	New
SDP					20	0.0	New
Renew					14	0.0	New
Majority		12,130	29.1	▲5.0			
Valid votes		41,773			41,881		
Invalid votes		151			72		
Turnout		41,924	61.1	▲7.2	41,953	61.1	▲7.1
SNP hold		Swing		▲2.5			

=== 2010s ===
2016 Scottish Parliament election: Almond Valley
Party	Candidate	Constituency			Region		
Party	Candidate	Votes	%	±%	Votes	%	±%
SNP	Angela Constance (Note: Incumbent member for this constituency)	18,475	53.0	▼1.3	16,878	48.3	▼0.3
Labour	Neil Findlay (Note: Elected on the party list)	10,082	28.9	▼7.4	8,453	24.2	▼7.6
Conservative	Stephanie Smith	5,308	15.2	▲9.1	5,868	16.8	▲10.7
Green					1,626	4.6	▲2.1
UKIP					875	2.5	▲1.7
Liberal Democrats	Charles Dundas	1,007	2.9	▲0.8	723	2.1	▲0.3
Women's Equality					231	0.7	New
Solidarity					215	0.6	▲0.5
RISE					110	0.3	New
Majority		8,393	24.1	▲6.1			
Valid votes		34,872			34,979		
Invalid votes		128			55		
Turnout		35,000	53.9	▲2.4	35,034	54.0	▲2.5
SNP hold		Swing					
Notes

2011 Scottish Parliament election: Almond Valley
Party	Candidate	Constituency			Region		
Party	Candidate	Votes	%	±%	Votes	%	±%
SNP	Angela Constance (Note: Incumbent member on the party list, or for another constituency)	16,704	54.3	N/A	14,946	48.6	N/A
Labour	Laurence Fitzpatrick	11,162	36.3	N/A	9,770	31.8	N/A
Conservative	Andrew Hardie	1,886	6.1	N/A	1,891	6.1	N/A
Independent	Margo MacDonald				1,282	4.2	N/A
Green					759	2.5	N/A
Liberal Democrats	Emma Sykes	656	2.1	N/A	550	1.8	N/A
All-Scotland Pensioners Party					396	1.3	N/A
BNP					334	1.1	N/A
National Front	Neil McIvor	329	1.1	N/A			
UKIP					237	0.8	N/A
Socialist Labour					198	0.6	N/A
Scottish Christian					101	0.3	N/A
Scottish Socialist					88	0.3	N/A
CPA					63	0.2	N/A
Liberal					46	0.1	N/A
Independent	David John Hogg				45	0.1	N/A
Solidarity					37	0.1	N/A
Independent	Ken O'Neil				7	0.0	N/A
Independent	Mev Brown				5	0.0	N/A
Majority		5,542	18.0	N/A			
Valid votes		30,737			30,755		
Invalid votes		86			73		
Turnout		30,823	51.5	N/A	30,828	51.5	N/A
SNP win (new seat)							

== See also ==
- List of Scottish Parliament constituencies and electoral regions (2026–)
