= Gordon Lindhurst =

Scottish politician

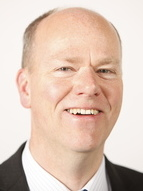

Member of the Scottish Parliament for Lothian (1 of 7 Regional MSPs)
- In office 5 May 2016 – 5 May 2021

Personal details
- Party: Scottish Conservatives
- Education: University of Edinburgh; University of Glasgow; Heidelberg University
- Occupation: Advocate

Gordon John Lindhurst is a former Scottish Conservative politician and practising advocate. He served as a Member of the Scottish Parliament (MSP) for the Lothian region from 2016 to 2021. Lindhurst has also been called as a barrister in England and Wales.

== Background and legal career ==
Lindhurst studied at the University of Edinburgh where he completed his first degree, an LLB (Honours). At Glasgow University he studied the vocational Diploma in Legal Practice before completing his legal training to become a solicitor with the Edinburgh law firm, Warden Bruce & Co. WS. Following qualification, Lindhurst studied for and was awarded a master's degree in European law at Heidelberg University in Germany, and is fluent in German. Thereafter calling to the Scottish Bar, he practised full time as an advocate until entering the Scottish Parliament. Lindhurst was also called as a barrister in England and Wales in 2008.

Lindhurst returned to practice in 2021.

== Political career ==
=== Early career ===
Lindhurst was the Conservative candidate for Linlithgow in the 1999 and 2003 Scottish Parliament elections. He also stood in the 2001 general election in Linlithgow and the 2005 Livingston by-election, finishing third of six with 9.0% and fourth of ten with 6.8% respectively. In the 2015 United Kingdom general election he stood as a candidate in Edinburgh South West, coming third of six candidates with 20.2% of the vote.

=== Election to the Scottish Parliament ===
In the 2016 Scottish Parliament election Lindhurst stood for the Edinburgh Pentlands constituency, finishing in second place, but successfully increasing the Scottish Conservative vote share. Having missed out in the constituency vote, he was instead elected for the Lothian regional list.

As an MSP, he served as Convener of the Economy, Jobs and Fair Work Committee, whose work included one of the few Committee Bills of the session, the Pre-Release Access to Official Statistics (Scotland) Act 2021. He also served as a member of the Social Security Committee, the Culture, Tourism, Europe and External Affairs Committee, and the Delegated Powers and Law Reform Committee during his time as an MSP.

Lindhurst ran again in Edinburgh Pentlands at the 2021 Scottish Parliament election, where he received 12,330 votes (32.3%), up by 0.1% compared to 2016. Additionally, Lindhurst sought re-election on the regional list, though was not entitled to a seat, due to being placed seventh.
