= Cameron Buchanan (politician) =

Scottish Conservative politician (1946–2023)

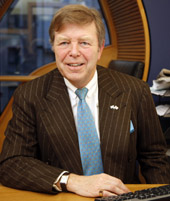
- Buchanan in 2014

Member of the Scottish Parliament for Lothian (1 of 7 Regional MSPs)
- In office 4 September 2013 – 24 March 2016
- Preceded by: David McLetchie (Note: Normally, regional MSPs do not have individual predecessors and successors. However, McLetchie died during a sitting parliament so was succeeded by Buchanan.)

Personal details
- Born: Cameron Roy Marchand Buchanan; 17 September 1946 Woking, Surrey, England
- Died: 18 June 2023 (aged 76) Edinburgh, Scotland
- Party: Scottish Conservatives
- Spouse: Emma Buchanan
- Children: 4

Cameron Roy Marchand Buchanan (17 September 1946 – 18 June 2023) was a Scottish Conservative politician who served as a Member of the Scottish Parliament (MSP) for the Lothian region from 2013 to 2016.

== Early life and career ==
Cameron Roy Marchand Buchanan was born on 17 September 1946 in Woking, Surrey. After studying at St Edward's School, Oxford and Sorbonne University, Buchanan worked as a textile entrepreneur and was managing director of woollen goods retailer Harrisons of Edinburgh prior to taking his seat.

== Political career ==
Buchanan was vice-chairman of the Scottish Conservative Party while working in retail. He took up his seat after it was vacated by former Scottish Conservative leader David McLetchie due to McLetchie's death from cancer in August 2013.

== Personal life and death ==
Buchanan lived in Edinburgh with his wife, Emma, who is a teacher. He died there on 18 June 2023, at the age of 76.
