= Nigel Don =

Scottish composer and politician (born 1954)

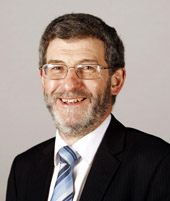

Convener of the Scottish Parliament Subordinate Legislation Committee
- In office 14 June 2011 – 4 June 2013
- Preceded by: Jamie Stone

Member of the Scottish Parliament for Angus North and Mearns
- In office 5 May 2011 – 24 March 2016
- Succeeded by: Mairi Evans
- Majority: 7,286

Member of the Scottish Parliament for North East Scotland
- In office 3 May 2007 – 22 March 2011

Personal details
- Born: 16 April 1954 (age 71) London, England
- Party: Scottish National Party
- Website: nigeldon.co.uk

Nigel Anderson Don (born 16 April 1954) is a Scottish composer, arranger and former politician. He was a Scottish National Party (SNP) Member of the Scottish Parliament (MSP) for two parliamentary terms, first for the North East Scotland region 2007–2011 then for the Angus North and Mearns constituency in the 2011–2016 term.

== Background ==
He was educated at King's College School, Pembroke College, Cambridge (MA 1978; MEng 2001) and the University of London (LLB).

Don had a 13-year career as a chemical engineer with Unilever. He then decided to take time out of working to stay at home and raise his children, which allowed his wife to continue working. He later became a music teacher and a publisher. From May 2016, Don has been working as a full-time composer based in Edinburgh, Scotland.

== Political career ==
Prior to his election to the Scottish Parliament, Don was a councillor (2003–2007) for Ninewells ward, and SNP Group Convenor on Dundee City Council. He was elected to the multi-member Lochee ward but resigned as councillor on 23 August 2007 to concentrate on his role as MSP.

He stood as a SNP candidate at the 2007 election and was elected from the SNP's regional list for the North East Scotland.

In the 2011 election he was elected for the Angus North and Mearns constituency. He was a Member of the Justice Committee and the Public Petitions Committee.

Don was Convenor of the Delegated Powers 2011–2013 then Convener of the Law Reform Committee 2013–2016. and a member of the Public Audit Committee from 2014.

His Political Interests included Law, Energy, Nutrition and Weight Management, Environment and Culture.

In August 2015 Don was deselected as candidate for the Angus North and Mearns constituency for the upcoming 2016 Scottish elections by local SNP members and replaced by Mairi Evans, who won with a 54% majority.

== Personal life ==
Don is married to Dr Wendy Wrieden; they have two adult children.

Scottish Parliament
New constituency	Member of the Scottish Parliament for Angus North & Mearns; 2011–2016	Succeeded by Mairi Evans
