= Sarah Boyack =

Scottish Labour politician (born 1961)

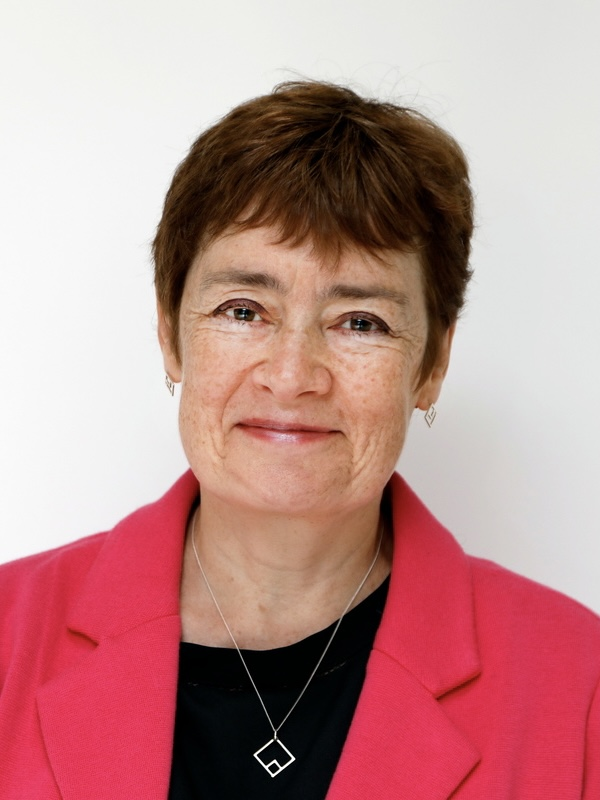
- Official portrait, 2019

Minister for Transport and Planning (Note: Transport and the Environment (1999–2000))
- In office 19 May 1999 – 27 November 2001
- First Minister: Donald Dewar; Jim Wallace (acting); Henry McLeish
- Preceded by: Office established
- Succeeded by: Wendy Alexander

Member of the Scottish Parliament for Lothian (1 of 7 Regional MSPs)
- In office 15 July 2019 – 9 April 2026
- Preceded by: Kezia Dugdale (Note: Normally, regional MSPs do not have individual predecessors and successors. However, Dugdale retired her seat during a sitting parliament so was succeeded by Boyack.)
- In office 5 May 2011 – 23 March 2016

Member of the Scottish Parliament for Edinburgh Central
- In office 6 May 1999 – 22 March 2011
- Preceded by: Constituency established
- Succeeded by: Marco Biagi

Scottish Labour portfolios
- 2014–2016: Shadow Cabinet Secretary for Rural Affairs, Food and Environment
- 2019–2021: Shadow Cabinet Secretary for Local Government
- 2021–present: Shadow Cabinet Secretary for Environment, Climate Change and Land Reform

Personal details
- Born: Sarah Herriot Boyack; 16 May 1961 (age 65) Glasgow, Scotland
- Party: Scottish Labour Co-operative
- Spouse: Andrew Walters (m. 2000; div. 2003)
- Education: University of Glasgow; Heriot-Watt University
- Profession: Town planner
- Website: www.sarahboyack.com

Sarah Herriot Boyack (born 16 May 1961) is a Labour Co-op politician who served as a Member of the Scottish Parliament (MSP) for the Lothian region from 2019 to 2026, and previously from 2011 to 2016. She formerly represented the Edinburgh Central constituency from 1999 to 2011.

== Early life and career ==
Boyack was born in May 1961 in Glasgow and brought up in Edinburgh. Her father, Jim Boyack, was an important figure in the Labour Party and the campaign for Scottish devolution. She was educated at the state comprehensive Royal High School, Edinburgh, where she was one of the first female pupils.

Starting in 1979, Boyack studied Modern History and Politics at the University of Glasgow, graduating with a Scottish MA Honours degree. She became active in the Labour club, where she was a protégé of Margaret Curran. She was chair of the Labour club from 1981 until 1982, and chair of the National Organisation of Labour Students from 1985 until 1986. During her time at Glasgow, she was involved in supporting the twinning with Bir Zeit University in the West Bank. After graduating, she gained a Diploma in Town and Country Planning at Heriot-Watt University.

Boyack worked as a town planner in the London Borough of Brent then as a strategic planner in Central Regional Council in Stirling. She then became a lecturer at the School of Planning and Housing at Heriot-Watt University and was Convener of the Scottish Branch of the Royal Town Planning Institute in 1997.

== Political career ==
=== Member of the Scottish Parliament: 1999–2016 ===
Boyack was elected to the new Scottish Parliament in the 1999 election for the Edinburgh Central constituency. She was Minister for Transport and the Environment in the Scottish Executive from 1999 until 2000. Then, she was Minister for Transport and Planning from 2000 until 2001, during which time she introduced one of Scottish Labour's flagship policies of free bus travel for people over 60 and disabled people. While in this role, Boyack was the second minister to face a vote of no confidence in the Scottish Parliament. The motion was lodged by the Scottish National Party (SNP) as they objected to the Executive awarding trunk road maintenance contracts to private companies rather than local authorities. Boyack survived this vote as only 33 MSPs voted in favour with 70 voting against, and 16 MSPs abstaining.

Re-elected for her constituency in the 2003 Scottish Parliament election, Boyack was elected by MSPs as Convener of the Scottish Parliament Environment and Rural Development Committee in June 2003. In this role, she received the RSPB Goldcrest Award in November 2004 for the most outstanding contribution to the development of environmental policy in Scotland since devolution. Later, in December 2005, she was named the Scottish Renewables Best Politician. She stood down from the committee in January 2007, when she returned to the Scottish Executive as Deputy Minister for the Environment and Rural Development.

Boyack lost her Edinburgh Central constituency seat in the 2011 Scottish Parliament election to Marco Biagi of the SNP. However, she was elected on the Lothian regional list as one of seven additional members. Following a landslide victory by the SNP in the election, Boyack co-chaired a review of the Labour Party in Scotland with Jim Murphy, commissioned by Ed Miliband in May 2011 and which reported back in Autumn of that year.

On 28 October 2014, Boyack declared she would stand in the upcoming election to become the Leader of the Scottish Labour Party. She came third to Jim Murphy and Neil Findlay with 9.24% of the vote.

She served as a member of the Parliament's Rural Affairs, Climate Change and Environment (RACCE) Committee during its scrutiny of the Land Reform Bill 2015.

=== Outside the Scottish Parliament: 2016–2019 ===
Boyack again contested the Edinburgh Central seat in the 2016 Scottish Parliament election, but was defeated by Scottish Conservative leader Ruth Davidson, who stood for the same constituency. Boyack was also placed third on the Lothian regional list of Labour candidates behind Kezia Dugdale and Neil Findlay, but did not return to Holyrood following the election since Labour won only two list seats.

In February 2017, Boyack was appointed as Head of Public Affairs at the Scottish Federation of Housing Associations, the membership body for social housing providers in Scotland.

=== Return following Kezia Dugdale's resignation: 2019–present ===
On 30 April 2019, it was announced Boyack would return to the Scottish Parliament as a list MSP, following Kezia Dugdale's decision to vacate her seat in the summer. As an unsuccessful Labour candidate on the Lothian regional list in 2016, Boyack was the next person on the list if a seat was vacated. She joined the Labour Co-operative group upon her return. In September 2019, Scottish Labour leader Richard Leonard appointed her as Scottish Labour Spokesperson for Local Government.

Boyack nominated Anas Sarwar in the 2021 Scottish Labour leadership election.

Boyack backed the UK Government's decision to introduce means-testing for the Winter Fuel Payment, voting in the Scottish Parliament against calls to reverse the decision.

On 16 June 2025, Boyack announced she would not contest the 2026 Holyrood election.

== Personal life ==
Boyack married former long-term partner Andrew Walters in December 2000. They had planned to marry in the October but postponed the wedding due to the death of Donald Dewar. The couple divorced in 2003 and they had no children together.

== Notes ==
Scottish Parliament
New parliament Scotland Act 1998	Member of the Scottish Parliament for Edinburgh Central; 1999–2011	Succeeded by Marco Biagi
Political offices
New office	Minister for Transport and the Environment; 1999–2000	Office abolished
New office	Minister for Transport and Planning; 2000–2001	Succeeded by Wendy Alexander as Minister for Enterprise, Transport and Lifelong Learning
Preceded by Alex Johnstone	Convener of the Scottish Parliament Environment and Rural Development Committee; 2003–2007	Succeeded by Maureen Macmillan
Preceded by Rhona Brankin	Deputy Minister for the Environment and Rural Development; 2007	Succeeded by Michael Russell as Minister for Environment
