= Mike MacKenzie (politician) =

Scottish politician (born 1958)

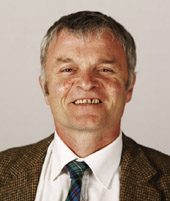

Member of the Scottish Parliament for Highlands and Islands
- In office 5 May 2011 – 24 March 2016

Personal details
- Born: 18 November 1958 (age 67) Oban, Scotland
- Party: Alba (from 2021)
- Other political affiliations: SNP (2011-2021)

Michael William Frederick MacKenzie (born 18 November 1958) is a Scottish politician. He is a former Scottish National Party (SNP) Member of the Scottish Parliament (MSP) for the Highlands and Islands region from 2011 to 2016.

== Early life ==
Mackenzie was born on 18 November 1958 in Oban. He was educated at Allan Glen's School.

== Personal life ==
MacKenzie and his family live on the small slate island of Easdale which is home to around 60 people. MacKenzie is married to Lynn, a teacher, and they have a son.

== Political career ==
At the 2010 general election, MacKenzie ran as the Scottish National Party (SNP) candidate in Argyll and Bute, finishing fourth with 8,563 votes (18.9%).

At the 2011 Scottish Parliament election, MacKenzie was the third-placed candidate on the party list for the Highlands and Islands region, and was elected.

MacKenzie sought re-election on the list at the 2016 Scottish Parliament election, but failed to retain his seat.

At the 2021 Scottish Parliament election, MacKenzie was placed sixth on the party list, and was not elected. In June 2021, a month after the election, he defected from the SNP to the Alba Party.

== Controversies ==
In May 2011, MacKenzie was chastised by a sheriff for going to a "pre-induction" meeting for new SNP MSPs instead of appearing in court to face allegations that he has failed to pay a £4,000 electricians bill while director of Mike MacKenzie builders. In July 2011, MacKenzie lost the court case.
