= Margaret McCulloch =

Scottish Labour politician (born 1952)

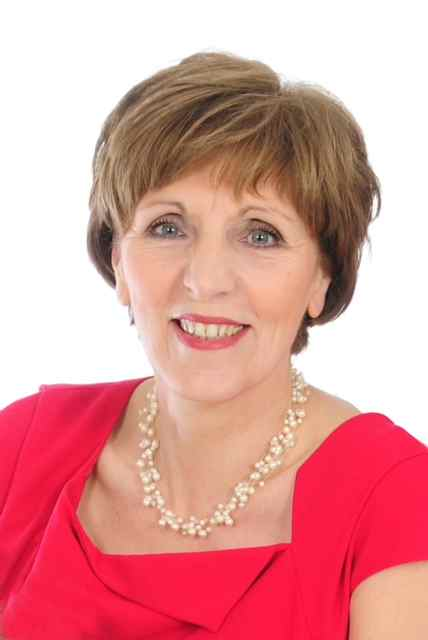
- McCulloch in 2012

Member of the Scottish Parliament for Central Scotland (1 of 7 Regional MSPs)
- In office 5 May 2011 – 24 March 2016

Personal details
- Born: 9 May 1952 (age 74)
- Party: Scottish Labour

Margaret McCulloch (born 9 May 1952) is a Scottish Labour Party politician. She was a Member of the Scottish Parliament (MSP) for the Central Scotland region 2011–2016.

== Background and personal life ==
Born in the Gorbals, Margaret was raised and educated in Glasgow. Prior to her election, she was an independent training consultant with her own business based in East Kilbride. She was also an External Verifier with the Scottish Qualifications Authority. She worked at the University of Strathclyde for 17 years, where she was a training executive, responsible for recruiting all staff under the age of 21, Modern Apprenticeships and ensuring the viability of the university's Centre for Skills Enhancement. She lives in Stewartfield in East Kilbride with her husband Ian.

== Political life ==
She was elected to the Scottish Parliament as a Labour member for the Central Scotland region in May 2011. Following this, she was a member of the Finance Committee, Infrastructure and Capital Investment Committee, Standards, Procedures and Public Appointments Committee and a substitute member of the Subordinate Legislation Committee. McCulloch was the Convenor of the Equal Opportunities Committee and a member of Delegate Power and Legal Reform Committee McCulloch was a member of the Cross Party Group on Construction and Convener of the Cross Party Group on Skills and the Cross Party Group on Towns and Town Centres, (established in February 2011) Convenor of Arthritis and Musculoskeletal Condition.

From 2012 until 2014, she was Convener of the Scottish Parliament Business Exchange, an independent educational charity which fosters understanding between Members of the Scottish Parliament and the business community.

The economy, education and training, youth unemployment, procurement and hospitality and tourism are listed among her political interests. McCulloch is a former Conservative Party member and candidate, standing for the Conservatives in the Scottish Parliamentary constituency of Cumbernauld and Kilsyth in 2003 and in the East Kilbride constituency at the 2001 Westminster General Election. In 2007, she contested the East Kilbride West ward on South Lanarkshire Council as a Scottish Labour candidate.

Since her election she has campaigned to raise the standard of hospital food at Hairmyres Hospital in NHS Lanarkshire, represented staff and residents affected by the collapse of Southern Cross and supported the STV Appeal.

In 2012, Parliamentary Question submitted by McCulloch revealed that the number of NHS patients in Scotland waiting for over twelve hours in Accident and Emergency units had doubled.

Working with First ScotRail she helped local communities participate in the Adopt a Station programme. South Lanarkshire College have since adopted East Kilbride rail station, Crosshouse Primary School have adopted Hairmyres rail station, Hamilton Grammar School have adopted Hamilton Central rail station and patients and staff from NHS Lanarkshire's Beckford Lodge have adopted Hamilton West rail station.

She was placed sixth on the Labour Central Scotland regional list in the 2016 Scottish Parliament election and missed out on being re-elected.
