= Gavin Brown (politician) =

Scottish politician (born 1975)

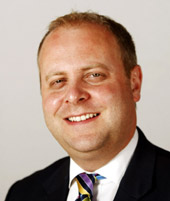

Convener of the Scottish Parliament Economy, Energy and Tourism Committee
- In office 8 June 2011 – 24 March 2016
- Preceded by: Iain Smith

Member of the Scottish Parliament for Lothian (1 of 7 Regional MSPs)
- In office 3 May 2007 – 24 March 2016

Personal details
- Born: 4 June 1975 (age 50) Kirkcaldy, Scotland
- Party: Conservative
- Profession: Solicitor

Gavin Lindberg Brown (born 4 June 1975) is a Scottish Conservative Party politician. He was a Member of the Scottish Parliament (MSP) for the Lothians region from 2007 to 2011, and then for the Lothian region from 2011 to 2016.

He contested Edinburgh South at the 2005 UK general election, where he came third. He contested the same seat at the 2007 Scottish Parliament election finishing fourth, but was elected to Holyrood as a list member for the Lothians region.

He was the party's Tourism and Enterprise Spokesman and sat on the Economy, Energy and Tourism Committee at Holyrood. He announced in 2015 that he would not be standing for re-election as an MSP in 2016.

Brown worked as a solicitor at McGrigors before his election to Holyrood. He is also a black belt in Tae Kwon Do and in 2008 ran the Edinburgh Marathon. He lives in the Fairmilehead area of Edinburgh and is married with one daughter and two sons.
