= Colin Keir =

Scottish National Party politician

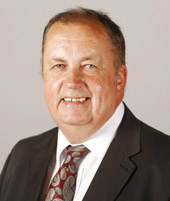

Member of the Scottish Parliament for Edinburgh Western
- In office 5 May 2011 – 24 March 2016
- Preceded by: Constituency established
- Succeeded by: Alex Cole-Hamilton

Personal details
- Born: Colin George Keir; 9 December 1959 (age 66) Edinburgh, Scotland, UK
- Party: Scottish National Party

Colin George Keir (born 9 December 1959) is a Scottish politician, formerly the Scottish National Party (SNP) Member of the Scottish Parliament (MSP) for the Edinburgh Western constituency from 2011 to 2016. Before being elected as a MSP, he was a councillor.

== Early life ==
Keir was born on 9 December 1959 in Edinburgh, Scotland. He was educated at Craigmount High School and Stevenson College. He is a former Scottish Schools 5000 metres champion and cross-country international.

== Political career ==
Between 2007 and 2012 he was a councillor for Drum Brae/Gyle ward on The City of Edinburgh Council. He was Convener of the council's Regulatory Committee.

Keir contested the seat of Edinburgh Western in the 2011 Scottish Parliament election, and defeated the Liberal Democrat incumbent Margaret Smith with a substantial swing to win with a margin of 2,689 votes.

In August 2015, after serving just one term, Keir was defeated in his attempt to be re-nominated as the SNP candidate in Edinburgh Western for the 2016 election. Keir was beaten by Toni Giugliano, a member of the party's national executive committee, who had received the backing of former leader Alex Salmond. During his campaign for re-selection Keir had issued campaign literature emphasising his support for a second independence referendum.
