= List of first ministers of Scotland =

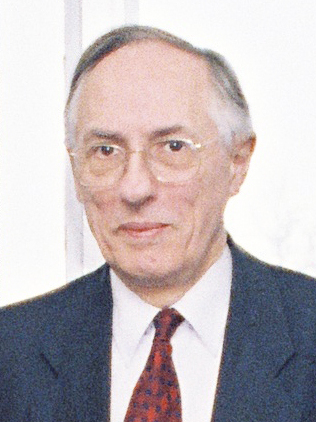
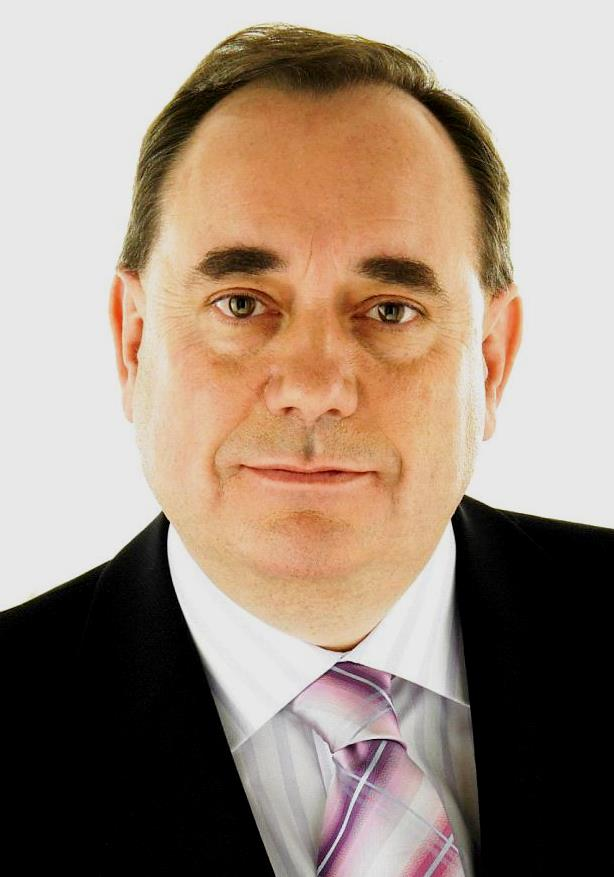
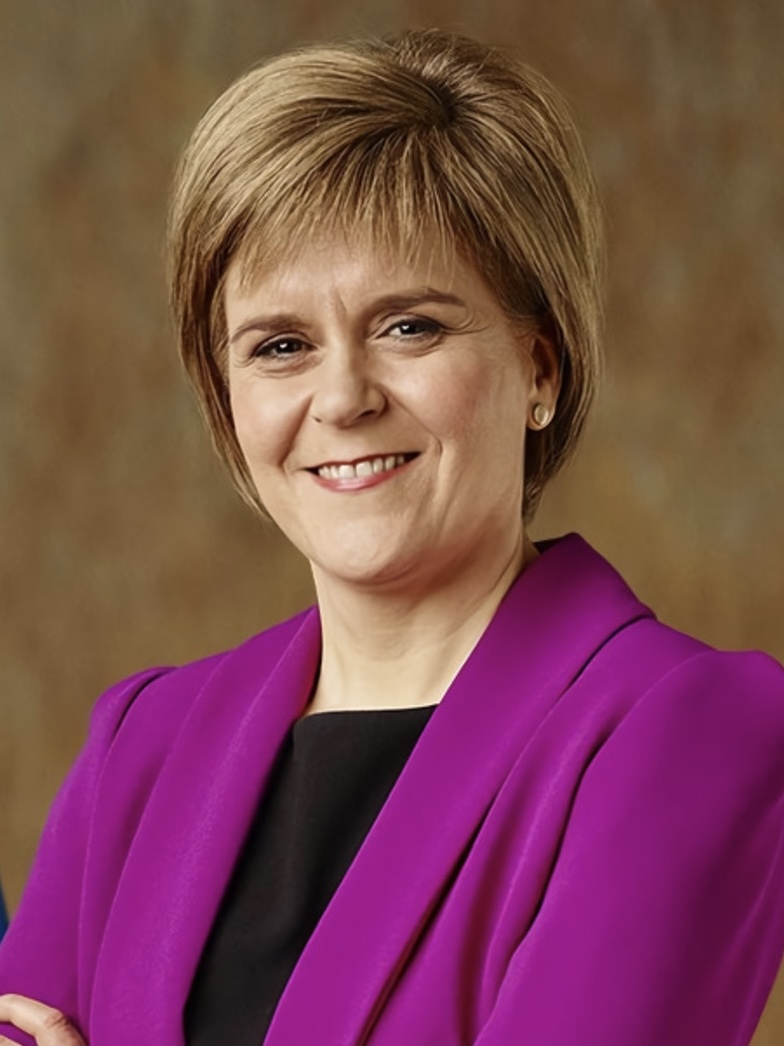
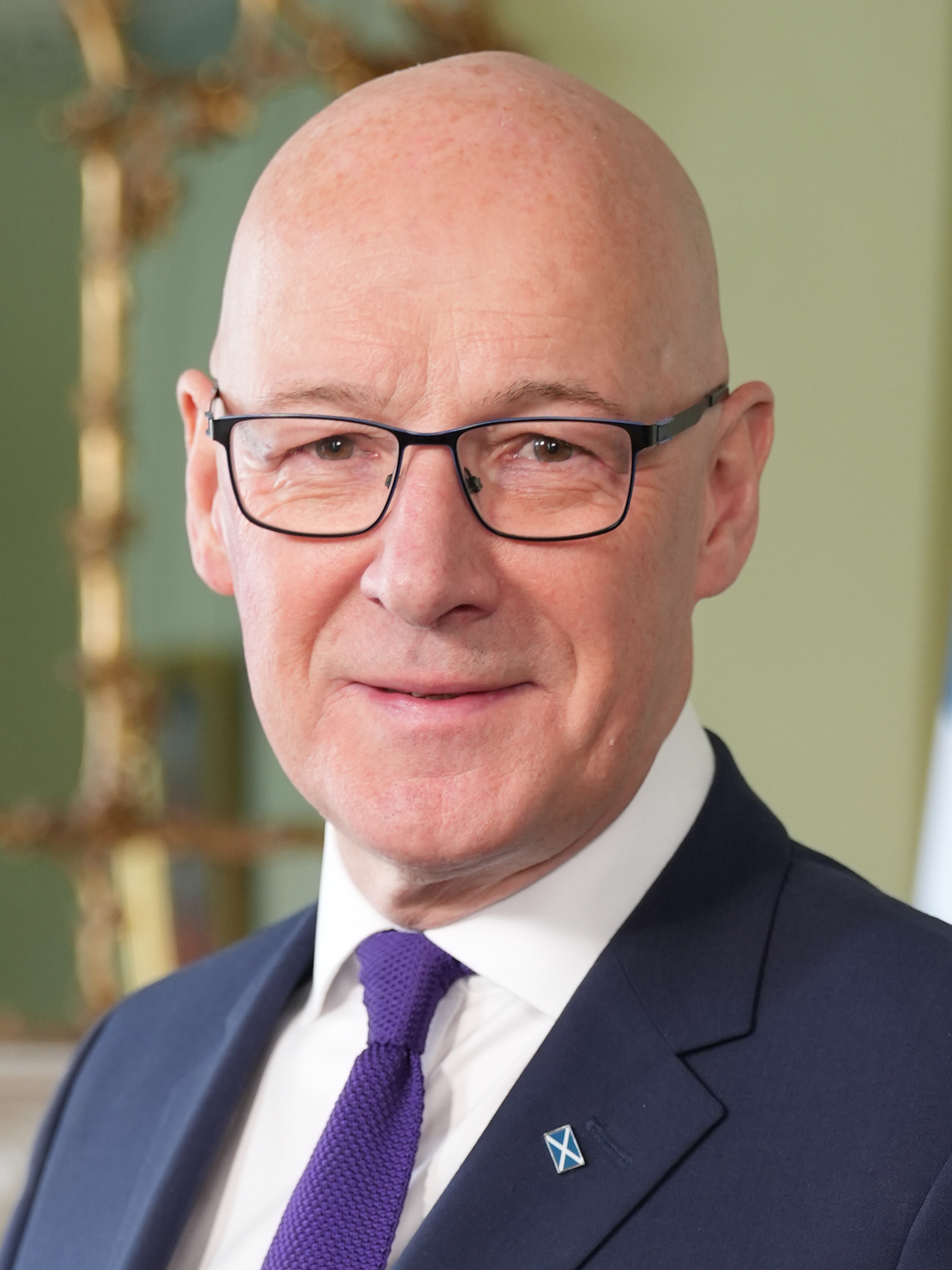
- Top left: Donald Dewar was the first ever first minister of Scotland
- Top right: Alex Salmond was the first SNP first minister
- Bottom left: Nicola Sturgeon was the first female and longest serving first minister
- Bottom right: John Swinney is the current and seventh first minister

The first minister of Scotland is the head of government of Scotland, leader of the Scottish Government and keeper of the Great Seal of Scotland. The first minister is responsible for the exercise of functions by the Cabinet of the Scottish Government; policy development and coordination; relationships with the rest of the United Kingdom, Europe and international relations. Since the establishment of the office in 1999, seven men (including both tenures as acting first minister by Jim Wallace) and one woman has served in the position.

Donald Dewar was the inaugural person to hold the position following his election in 1999 and is regarded as the "Father of the Nation". Following Dewar's death in 2000 whilst still serving in office, he was succeeded by his enterprise minister, Henry McLeish. McLeish resigned from the office of first minister on 8 November 2001 following the officegate scandal and is the shortest-serving first minister, having served in the role for 1 year and 12 days. Humza Yousaf, who served as first minister between March 2023 and May 2024 is the second shortest–serving first minister after a period in office of 1 year and 39 days. Sturgeon is the longest-serving first minister, having surpassed Salmond on 25 May 2022. Salmond in turn spent a total of 7 and a half years in the role.

The current first minister is John Swinney, who leads the Government of the 7th Scottish Parliament, whereas his predecessors Humza Yousaf and Nicola Sturgeon led the Governments of the 6th Scottish Government. Before that, Alex Salmond, led the governments of the 3rd and 4th Scottish Parliaments which was first elected in 2007 as a minority government, and re-elected in 2011, where they formed the first majority government in the 4th Scottish Parliament. The first minister is a member of the Scottish Parliament (MSP), and is nominated by the Scottish Parliament before being officially appointed by the monarch.

== List of first ministers of Scotland ==
The parties shown are those to which the first ministers belonged to at the time they held office, and the constituencies shown are those they represented while in office.

Political parties

Scottish Labour Party
Scottish Liberal Democrats
Scottish National Party

Status

Background and italics indicates caretaker first minister

Legend

- — Indicates appointed without an election
- (—) Indicates acting first minister
- † Indicates died in office

No.	Portrait	Name (birth–death) constituency	Term of office			Party	Election (parliament)	Government	Deputy	Monarch (reign)	Ref.
No.	Portrait	Name (birth–death) constituency	Took office	Left office	Tenure	Party	Election (parliament)	Government	Deputy	Monarch (reign)	Ref.
1		Donald Dewar (1937–2000); MSP for Glasgow Anniesland; Premiership	17 May 1999	11 October 2000†	1 year, 147 days	Labour	1999 (1st)	Dewar; Lab – LD	Jim Wallace	Elizabeth II (1952–2022)	
(—)		Jim Wallace (1954–2026); MSP for Orkney	11 October 2000	27 October 2000	16 days	Liberal Democrat	— (1st)	Dewar; Lab – LD (caretaker)	Jim Wallace	Elizabeth II (1952–2022)	
2		Henry McLeish (born 1948); MSP for Central Fife; Premiership	27 October 2000	8 November 2001	1 year, 12 days	Labour	— (1st)	McLeish; Lab – LD	Jim Wallace	Elizabeth II (1952–2022)	
(—)		Jim Wallace (1954–2026); MSP for Orkney	8 November 2001	27 November 2001	19 days	Liberal Democrat	— (1st)	McLeish; Lab – LD (caretaker)	Jim Wallace	Elizabeth II (1952–2022)	
3		Jack McConnell (born 1960); MSP for Motherwell and Wishaw; Premiership	27 November 2001	16 May 2007	5 years, 170 days	Labour	— (1st)	McConnell I Lab – LD	Jim Wallace	Elizabeth II (1952–2022)	
3		Jack McConnell (born 1960); MSP for Motherwell and Wishaw; Premiership	27 November 2001	16 May 2007	5 years, 170 days	Labour	2003 (2nd)	McConnell II; Lab – LD	Jim Wallace	Elizabeth II (1952–2022)	
3		Jack McConnell (born 1960); MSP for Motherwell and Wishaw; Premiership	27 November 2001	16 May 2007	5 years, 170 days	Labour	2003 (2nd)	McConnell II; Lab – LD	Nicol Stephen	Elizabeth II (1952–2022)	
4		Alex Salmond (1954–2024); MSP for Gordon (until 2011); MSP for Aberdeenshire East (from 2011); Premiership	17 May 2007	18 November 2014	7 years, 185 days	SNP	2007 (3rd)	Salmond I SNP (minority)	Nicola Sturgeon	Elizabeth II (1952–2022)	
4		Alex Salmond (1954–2024); MSP for Gordon (until 2011); MSP for Aberdeenshire East (from 2011); Premiership	17 May 2007	18 November 2014	7 years, 185 days	SNP	2011 (4th)	Salmond II; SNP	Nicola Sturgeon	Elizabeth II (1952–2022)	
5		Nicola Sturgeon (born 1970); MSP for Glasgow Southside; Premiership	20 November 2014	28 March 2023	8 years, 128 days	SNP	— (4th)	Sturgeon I SNP	John Swinney	Elizabeth II (1952–2022)	
5		Nicola Sturgeon (born 1970); MSP for Glasgow Southside; Premiership	20 November 2014	28 March 2023	8 years, 128 days	SNP	2016 (5th)	Sturgeon II; SNP (minority)	John Swinney	Elizabeth II (1952–2022)	
5		Nicola Sturgeon (born 1970); MSP for Glasgow Southside; Premiership	20 November 2014	28 March 2023	8 years, 128 days	SNP	2021 (6th)	Sturgeon III; SNP – Green	John Swinney	Elizabeth II (1952–2022)	
5		Nicola Sturgeon (born 1970); MSP for Glasgow Southside; Premiership	20 November 2014	28 March 2023	8 years, 128 days	SNP	2021 (6th)	Sturgeon III; SNP – Green	John Swinney	Charles III (2022–present)	
6		Humza Yousaf (born 1985); MSP for Glasgow Pollok; Premiership	29 March 2023	7 May 2024	1 year, 39 days	SNP	— (6th)	Yousaf I SNP – Green	Shona Robison	Charles III (2022–present)	
6		Humza Yousaf (born 1985); MSP for Glasgow Pollok; Premiership	29 March 2023	7 May 2024	1 year, 39 days	SNP	— (6th)	Yousaf II; SNP (minority)	Shona Robison	Charles III (2022–present)	
7		John Swinney (born 1964); MSP for Perthshire North; Premiership	8 May 2024	Incumbent	2 years, 130 days	SNP	— (6th)	Swinney I SNP (minority)	Kate Forbes	Charles III (2022–present)	
7		John Swinney (born 1964); MSP for Perthshire North; Premiership	8 May 2024	Incumbent	2 years, 130 days	SNP	2026 (7th)	Swinney II; SNP (minority)	Jenny Gilruth	Charles III (2022–present)	

== Timeline of Scottish first ministers ==
The following chart lists first secretaries and first ministers by lifespan (living first secretaries and first ministers on the green line), with the years outside of their tenure in beige.
