= Premiership of Jack McConnell =

Period of Scottish governance from 2001 to 2007

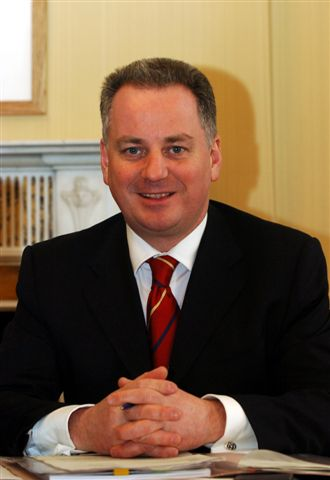
- Official portrait, 2001
- Premiership of Jack McConnell; 27 November 2001 – 16 May 2007
- Monarch: Elizabeth II
- Cabinet: 1st McConnell government 2nd McConnell government
- Party: Labour Party in Scotland
- Election: 2003
- Seat: Bute House

Jack McConnell's term as First Minister of Scotland began on 27 November 2001 when he was formally sworn into office at the Court of Session. It followed the resignation of Henry McLeish over the Officegate scandal. His term ended on 16 May 2007, following the defeat of the Scottish Labour Party in the 2007 Scottish Parliament election, where the Scottish National Party formed a minority government.

McConnell entered office amid the aftermath of the Scottish Parliament's first political scandal and suffered fierce opposition from the Leader of the Opposition and other Opposition Shadow Cabinets of the Scottish Parliament.

== Scottish Labour leadership bid ==
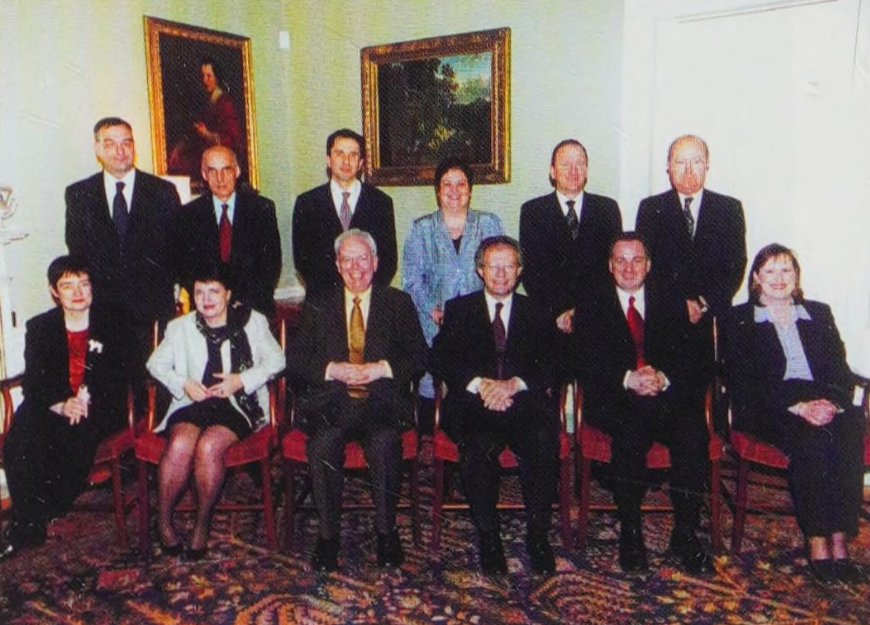
McConnell (second from right) served in the McLeish government under First Minister Henry McLeish

Henry McLeish resigned as First Minister of Scotland and Leader of the Labour Party in Scotland (Note: Prior to the 2011 Boyack-Murphy review, Scottish Labour was officially called the Labour Party in Scotland until the review change.) on 8 November 2001 over the Officegate scandal, regarding the sub let of his constituency office. In the resulting search for a leader, Jack McConnell was seen by many political analysts as the likely successor. McConnell had previously contested against McLeish on the 2000 leadership election following the death of Donald Dewar, but lost. Other likely candidates included Wendy Alexander and Susan Deacon.

McConnell launched his bid to be the next leader and on the 13 November 2001, he emerged as the only candidate to secure the seven nominations needed to run. Left-wing Labour activist, John McAllion, announced his candidacy, however, he only received one nominee from Elaine Smith.

On the same day McConnell was announced leader-elect of Scottish Labour, he revealed he had an extra-marital affair seven years prior. In a press conference in Edinburgh with his wife, Bridget McConnell, he stated: "If I become first minister, it would be very wrong for my family or anybody else to suffer because my behaviour then is still a secret today. That is why we are now being open about the fact that I did have an affair seven years ago. At the time I made mistakes, including denying the facts publicly and privately".

Although McConnell emerged as the only candidate, he still needed more than 50% of the support of Labour MSPs. On 17 November 2001, he was officially elected unopposed as Leader of the Labour Party in Scotland after receiving the support of 97.23% of MSPs. In his acceptance speech, he stated he was "deeply honoured to receive such overwhelming support" and highlighted that much work still needed to be done "to make devolution a success" and achieve "first class public services".

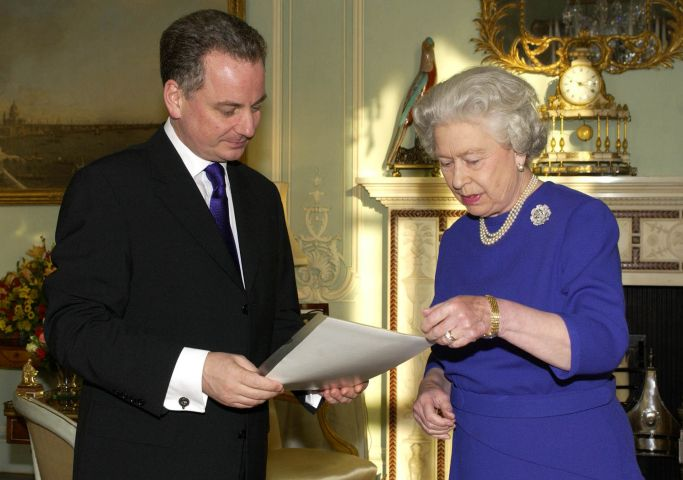
McConnell receives the Royal Warrant of Appointment by Her Majesty the Queen, November 2001

On 22 November 2001, McConnell was elected by the Scottish Parliament to be the next First Minister of Scotland. He had support of his Labour Party and their coalition partner the Liberal Democrats, following talks over concession for electoral reform for local government elections and the abolishment of university tuition fees. McConnell received 70 votes, defeating the leader of the Scottish National Party (SNP), John Swinney, leader of the Scottish Conservatives, David McLetchie, and Independent MSP, Dennis Canavan, by 34, 19, 3 respectively.

Following his nomination, the First Minister-elect visited London to meet the British Prime Minister, Tony Blair. Then after, McConnell attended Buckingham Palace, where he was issued the Royal Warrant of Appointment by Her Majesty the Queen. On 27 November 2001, McConnell was officially sworn into office as First Minister of Scotland at the Court of Session in Edinburgh.

As a result of him becoming First Minister, he was appointed Keeper of the Great Seal of Scotland and to the Privy Council, earning the title 'The Right Honourable' for life.

== First term; 2001–2003 ==
=== Cabinet appointments ===
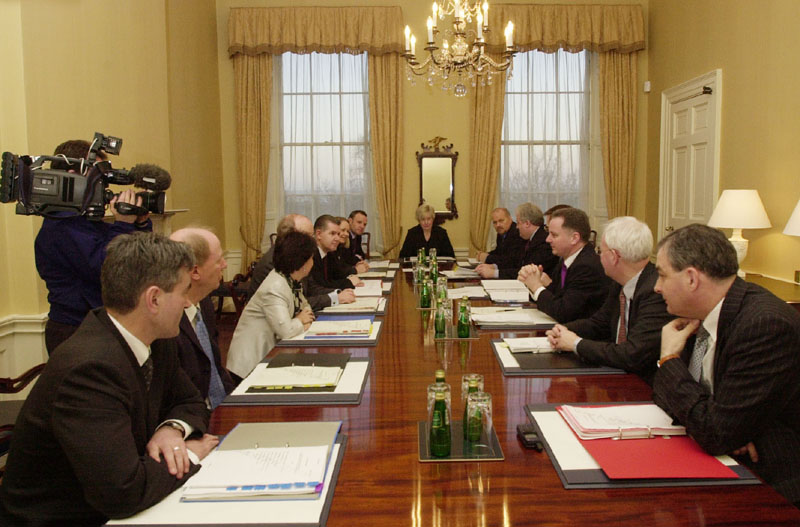
First meeting of the McConnell government, November 2001

Shortly after being appointed McConnell began making appointments to his cabinet. Jim Wallace remained in the post of Deputy First Minister and Wendy Alexander and Ross Finnie remained as ministers. Sam Galbraith and Angus MacKay stood down and Jackie Baillie, Sarah Boyack and Tom McCabe were reshuffled out of government, while Susan Deacon was offered the post of social justice minister but refused the offer and moved to the backbenches. Cathy Jamieson, Mike Watson, Malcolm Chisholm, Iain Gray, Patricia Ferguson and Andy Kerr were all promoted to cabinet.

Following the appointment of his first government, McConnell used the first meeting of his newly formed cabinet that he intended for his administration to focus on the priorities of both the country and its people, pledging for unnecessary distractions to be avoided. Speaking during the first meeting of his cabinet, McConnell told his ministerial team he wished for them to "get rid of unnecessary paperwork and diversions" in order for ministers to be able to focus on the "key areas".

His cabinet appointments were met with criticism by opposition parties in parliament, with the Scottish National Party (SNP) leader John Swinney claiming that McConnell had used his cabinet reshuffle as an opportunity to "settle scores and stab colleagues in the back". Swinney further claimed that "Labour are now in turmoil" and suggested that following McConnell's cabinet appointments it would be seen as "the day Labour admitted they have failed to deliver". The Scottish Conservatives leader David McLetchie expressed disappointment that McConnell did not reduce the number of cabinet ministers during the formation of his first cabinet, claiming that McConnell was "more concerned about putting one over on his political opponents" and suggested that McConnell was not interested in "delivering a keener, fitter government for the people of Scotland".

=== Policies and continuity of government ===
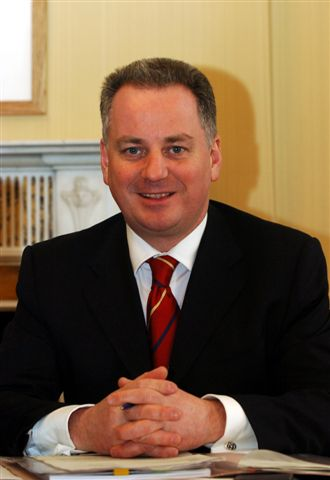
McConnell shortly after becoming first minister, 2001

McConnell advised his cabinet that he was not seeking a large volume of new initiatives and policies for his administration, but rather that he remained committed to the policy areas of the previous administration. A spokesperson for the Scottish Executive said that McConnell had told his cabinet for the need to "focus on delivering what is already there" as he felt it was important that his administration "makes sure we are delivering on the targets that have been set".

McConnell announced that under his premiership, the Scottish Executive would not change its position on issues such as private involvement in public services, proportional representation for local government elections and the financial independence of the Scottish Parliament. Ministers of his government were given suggestions by McConnell to follow his tactic he deployed whilst serving as the Minister for Education under Henry McLeish by speaking with the public to gauge public opinion to drive forward policy objectives rather than "listening to the interest groups that may come to Edinburgh to lobby".

Entering government, McConnell vowed that his key policy objectives would relate to schools, health services, jobs, crime and transport which he dubbed "the peoples priorities". He remained committed to the Scottish Labour–Scottish Liberal Democrat coalition agreement which had been in place since the creation of the Dewar government in 1999, but acknowledged that some of the policies and priorities of the coalition administration could "take some time" to implement. He appeared to criticise the predecessor administrations to his, particularly relating to education, stating that "failures in relation to children" by the previous governments were "unacceptable".

Following his appointment as Leader of the Scottish Labour Party unopposed, opposition parties in the Scottish Parliament, particularly the Scottish National Party (SNP), were critical of the manner in which McConnell was elected as both party leader and subsequently first minister. The leader of the SNP, John Swinney, said that McConnell's victory unopposed was "deeply damaging to democracy". The Scottish Conservatives said that his appointment as Scottish Labour leader was a "sham", claiming that by being elected unopposed he had "no real mandate" to become the next first minister of the country. In response, McConnell said that he respected "democratic open politics" and vowed to project such values.

=== Domestic affairs ===
==== Income tax ====
One of the earliest announcements by the new executive under McConnell was the ability for the Scottish Parliament to raise or lower income tax by up to 3p in the pound would not be invoked under a McConnell administration. Shortly afterwards, the Constitution Unit think tank operated by University College London issued a warning that disputed McConnell's position on not altering the rate of income tax in Scotland by suggesting that the Scottish Executive may be required to raise income tax in order to fund the executives increase in spending.

The Constitution Unit warned that as devolution became embedded into Scottish political and public life there was an increased risk of the financial pressures in Scotland being greater than they were prior to devolution coming into force in 1999. The issue of finance and funding public spending on services were widely speculated to be a key debating issue ahead of the 2003 Scottish Parliament election. The Scottish Executive was warned that it could face a funding shortfall of £2 billion as a result on its pledge to increase the pay of teachers, spending on education, free care for the elderly and local government.

McConnell gave no indication that following the 2003 election that his position on not changing the rate of income tax would change.

==== Sporting event bids ====
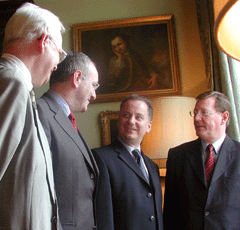
McConnell (second from right) meets with David Trimble, First Minister of Northern Ireland at Bute House, June 2002

In February 2002, Scotland joined forces with the Republic of Ireland in a bid to host the 2008 European Football Championship. McConnell was initially unconvinced that it was worth spending around £100 million on the tournament, but he later put his support behind the joint bid with the Irish.

Although the bid lost out to Austria/Switzerland, McConnell later supported other attempts to land major supporting events including London's successful bid for the 2012 Olympic Games and Glasgow's bid for the 2014 Commonwealth Games.

==== Education ====
In 2002, McConnell pledged that the Scottish Executive would commit to building 100 new schools across Scotland by 2006. In order to achieve this, McConnell advocated for the use of Public Private Partnerships (PPP), stating "we'll work together to sort out how we give people maximum return for every one of their pounds we are spending. Sometimes we'll invest with public capital and sometimes we'll invest with private capital. Let's be clear. We set the standards. We demand the quality and PPPs don't just attract finance; they make sure private contractors deliver hospitals and schools for our communities on time, within budget, well designed and easily maintained". At that time, he advocated that "private finance would facilitate the construction or rebuilding of 100 schools around the country".

In November 2002, McConnell claimed that teachers in Scotland should have the ability to move between primary and secondary schools to assist in the transition of children from primary school to secondary school. One of McConnell's spokesperson said that McConnell had been driven to implement policy changes on the backdrop of "children making the transition can have some problems. The first minister will be setting out the first steps towards addressing what is a problem that has been around for as long as we can remember".

In order to drive standards in Scottish schools, in November 2002, McConnell announced plans that would allow Head Teachers in Scotland to have more authority in regards to setting their own standards and priorities for their respective schools. During this period, McConnell also used his position as First Minister to advocate for schools to provide more vocational education courses to pupils, as well as increased links and partnerships with local colleges and businesses to improve training and educational programmes for young people. Additionally, McConnell advocated for greatest use of specialist teachers in schools to provide learning in subjects including music and sport.

==== Sectarianism ====
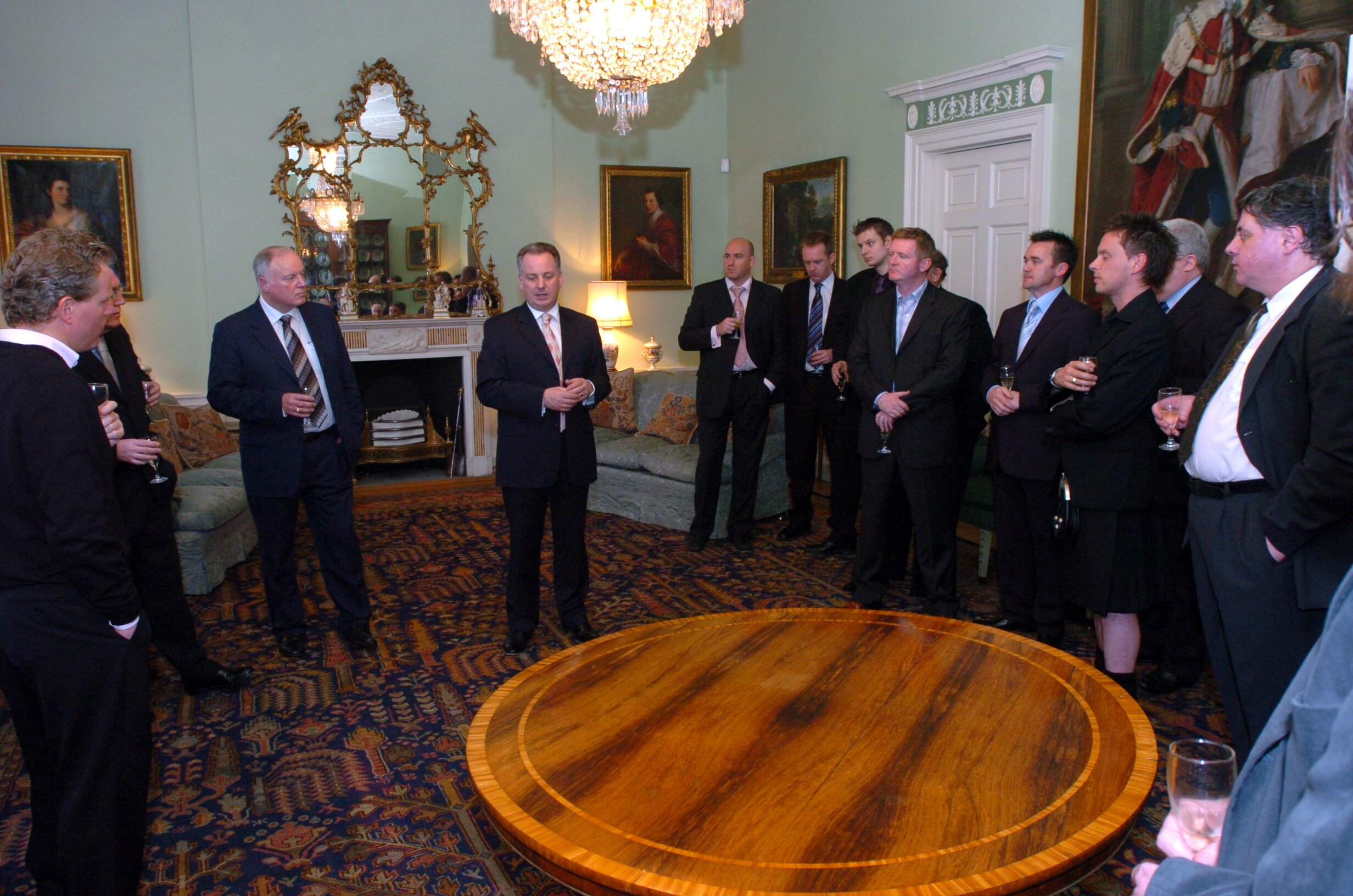
McConnell hosting an anti-sectarianism event at Bute House, 2002

In December 2002, McConnell launched his government's campaign against sectarianism. McConnell pledged that his government would review local authority powers to act on any abusive behaviour which occur at marches, parades and other events that take place within any local authority in Scotland, commit to review the approaches already in place to tackle sectarian behaviour through the school, university and youth sectors and implement Football Banning Orders as part of the Police, Public Order and Criminal Justice (Scotland) Act 2006. Additionally, McConnell announced that his government would deliver a programme of performances of an anti-sectarianism, aiming to reach "at least" 700 school pupils" by the summer of 2006, as well as pledging funding for organisations to carry out research into the effect sectarian behaviour has on the workforce in Scotland if such behaviour is evident in the workplace.

=== 2003 Scottish Parliament election ===
McConnell was re elected MSP for Motherwell and Wishaw at the Scottish Parliament elections. The Labour Party in Scotland won 50 seats, the largest number, and formed another coalition government with the Liberal Democrats which won 17 seats.

== Second term; 2003–2007 ==
=== Re–appointment ===
On 15 May, McConnell was re-appointed First Minister of Scotland and on the same day the Scottish government published A Partnership for a Better Scotland which set out the government's priorities for the four-year term ahead. This was followed by the "Fresh Talent initiative" which was created and developed to focus at addressing the demographic decline in Scotland and ageing Scottish population by attracting young and skilled immigrants, primarily from other European Union countries (such as Poland and Slovakia primarily) to be attracted to Scotland as a place to live and work.

=== Cabinet appointments ===
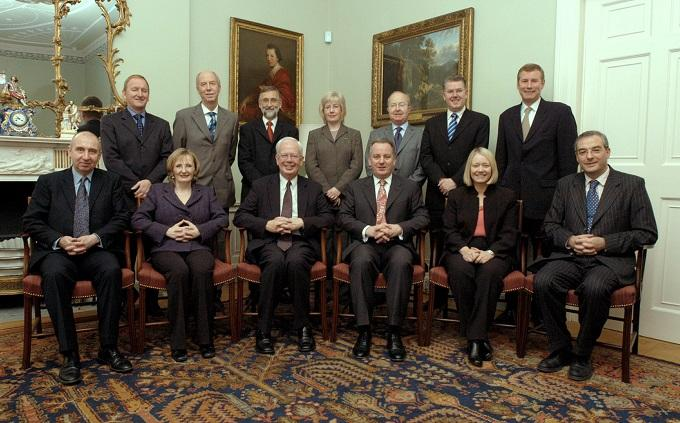
The Second McConnell government, May 2003

McConnell announced his second government on 20 May 2003 and promised to "restore public confidence in devolution" with a pledge to tackle issues including youth crime and anti-social behaviour within communities. Jim Wallace, the Minister for Justice in McConnell's first government, moved to Minister for Enterprise and Lifelong Learning, whilst the Cathy Jamieson, the previous holder of Wallace's new cabinet position was moved into Wallace's vacant post of Minister for Justice. Jamieson was tasked with overseeing the implementation of the youth crime initiative launched by the Labour Party, which would see parents of persistent young offenders penalised. The initiative was criticised by the administrations coalition partners, the Scottish Liberal Democrats, but they became natural on their position of the initiative following assurances from McConnell that Scottish Liberal Democrat members would have an increase role in his new cabinet and the return of the proportional representation (PR) voting system for elections to local government in the country.

Widely seen as an important and significant ally for McConnell, Andy Kerr retained his cabinet position as Minister for Finance, whilst Mike Watson was removed from his cabinet position as Minister for Tourism. There had been a significant amount of speculation that Wendy Alexander would return to the cabinet under McConnell. Whilst it was not known as to which role Alexander would have been offered, she was ultimately not appointed to the cabinet nor was it known whether she was asked by McConnell to join his government. Facing criticism over the number of ministers within the Scottish Executive, McConnell reduced the number of total ministers in his government from 20 to 18, but increased the number of cabinet ministers from 10 to 11. McConnell introduced his new cabinet by claiming that with his new cabinet in place there was "a chance to change Scotland for good".

=== Presidency of REGLEG ===
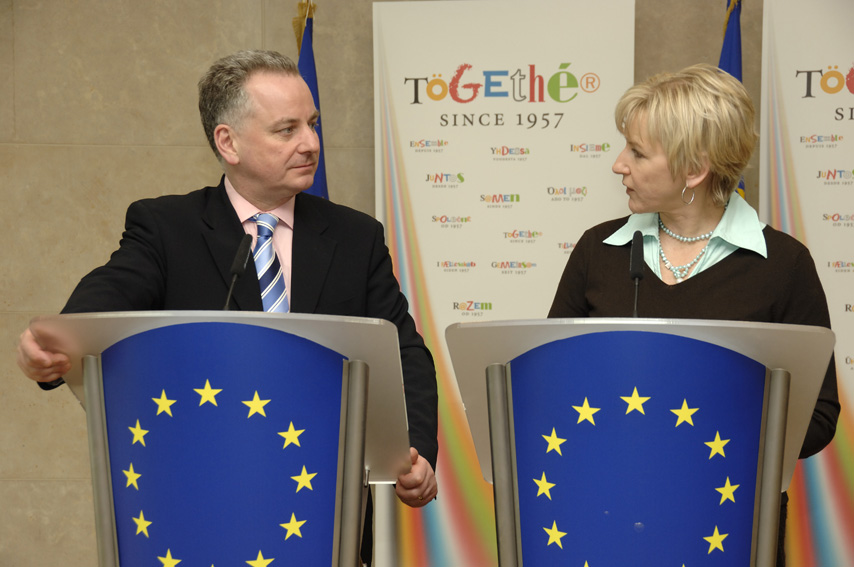
McConnell with Vice President of the European Commission Margot Wallström in Brussels, March 2007

During November 2003 and November 2004, McConnell held the Presidency of the Conference of European Regions with Legislative Power (REGLEG). His presidency of the conference was described by the European Strategy as "providing an important opportunity for Scotland to play a key role on the EU stage". Additionally, it was argued that McConnell and Scotland's presidency "will allow Scotland to build strong allies and promote Scottish interests among the leading legislative regions of the EU". Scotland's involvement in REGLEG was said to be "principally about advancing Scotland’s position as a major legislative region in Europe".

=== Public smoking ban ===
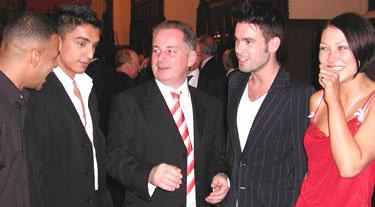
McConnell (centre) attends the 2003 MTV Europe Music Awards at Western Harbour in Edinburgh

One of the most significant implementations during his tenure as first minister was the successful campaign to ban smoking in Scottish public places, such as pubs, public transport and restaurants, making Scotland the first country within the United Kingdom to do so, which lead to McConnell receiving praise for his leadership on this issue, ultimately leading other countries to follow.

Despite earlier doubts about a widespread ban on smoking in public places, in 2004, McConnell issued his strongest commitment to a public smoking ban being implemented in Scotland. Following a visit to Dublin, where the Republic of Ireland had already implemented a public smoking band, he said that it was clear to see the "policy's overwhelming popularity and high level of compliance with the public". The Minister for Health in the Irish Government, Micheál Martin, advised McConnell not to be "worried about the backlash such a controversial move could provoke" and assured McConnell that it was the Irish people that "wanted it to happen and then made it happen".

He suggested that it was both "desirable and possible" for the same policy to be issued in Scotland and confirmed that he would issue a public statement by the end of the year on what a smoking ban in public places would both look like and mean for Scotland. By contrast, the public opinion on a smoking ban in public places in the country was varied, with organisations such as Freedom2Choose and the Scottish Licensed Trade Association against the legislation, whilst the Royal College of General Practitioners Scotland were supportive.

A ban on smoking in public places in Scotland eventually came into force by the end of March 2006, with McConnell claiming that there was expected to be "issued" in the early days of the new legislation coming into force. McConnell pledged that local councils would receive an additional investment of £6 million over the next three years in order to provide financial assistance to councils to implement the legislation and allow them to employ more environmental health officers to enforce the new law.

=== Scotland Malawi Partnership ===
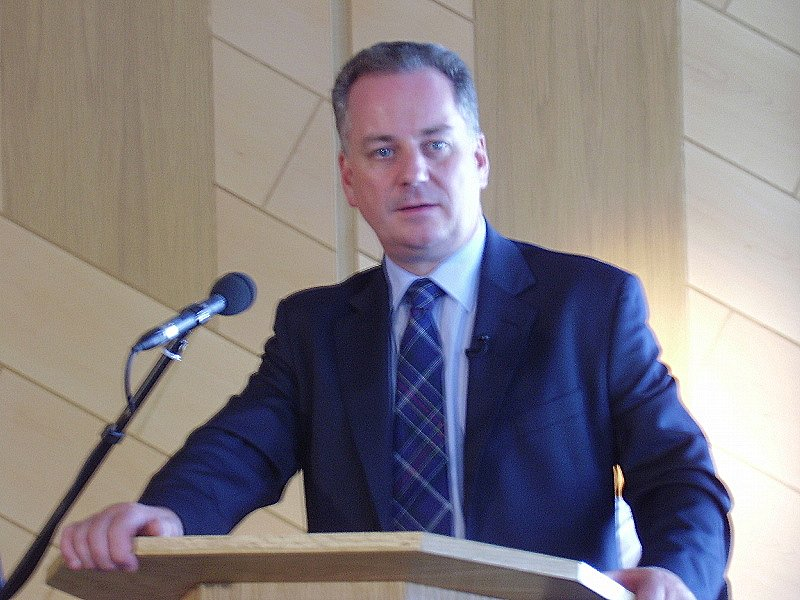
McConnell addressing the Scottish Parliament, August 2005

On 29 April 2005, the Scotland Malawi Partnership held a 'Shaping the Partnership' consultative conference at the University of Strathclyde where the proposed structure and remit of the partnership were decided upon.

In May 2005, Bob Geldoff addressed the Scottish Parliament which he used as an opportunity to highlight the role McConnell can play "in addressing the issue of political corruption in Africa" by "using the Scottish Parliament to underpin efforts to entrench honest, open democracy in Africa". McConnell instructed the Scottish Executive to produce findings on the role Scotland could play in tackling issues in African communities such as poverty and the aids pandemic. Additionally, he confirmed that he would visit Malawi that month with a "group of youngsters" as part of their education to "study the issue of education for young people in Africa". A stronger collaboration between schools in Scotland and Malawi was given priority by McConnell, and following the visit to Malawi in May with the group of pupils, an exchange programme would be established between the schools involved with McConnell's visit to Malawi.

In November 2005, the Malawi After Gleneagles: A Commission for Africa Case-Study was held at the Scottish Parliament which included over 250 delegates from Malawi and Scotland to discuss international development between the two countries. McConnell and President of Malawi, Dr Bingu wa Mutharika were keynote speakers during the event at the Scottish Parliament, and during the President of Malawi's visit, the Cooperation Agreement between Scotland and Malawi was signed between McConnell and Mutharika.

=== 31st G8 summit ===
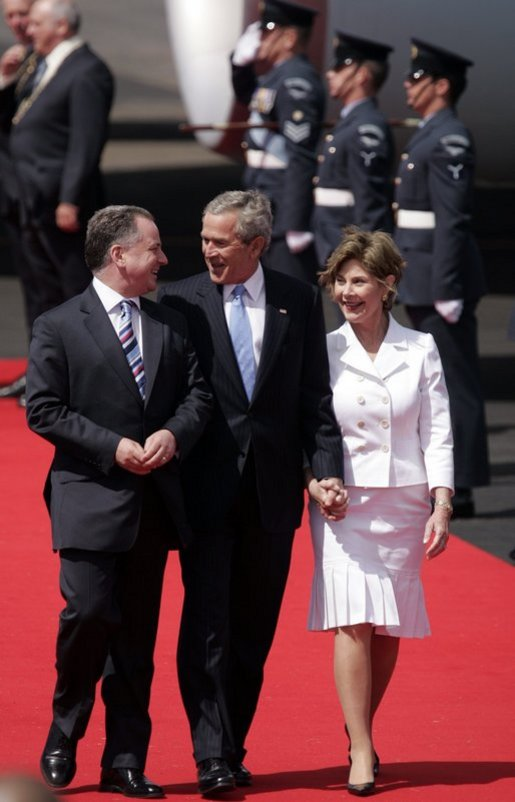
U.S. President George W. Bush and First Lady Laura Bush with McConnell ahead of the 31st G8 summit

As the United Kingdom, and ultimately Scotland, was scheduled to host the 31st G8 summit at the Gleneagles Hotel, McConnell expressed his wish for the UK Government to pay for any and all associated costs as a result of hosting the summit and claimed that the Scottish Executive was being placed in an "intolerable position". Under McConnell, the executive warned that it would make the costs of security and policing the event public.

Despite assurances to the Scottish Parliament in May 2005 that the cost of hosting the G8 summit "would be nowhere near £100 million", overall cost of hosting the event was estimated to be £90.9 million. In addition to the £20 million contributed by HM Treasury, the Foreign Office contributed £10 million whilst the Scottish Executive was expected to pay the remaining £65 million.

McConnell attended the 31st G8 summit which was held in Gleneagles Hotel, Scotland, and welcomed guests invited to the conference to Glasgow Prestwick Airport on arrival.

=== 2007 Scottish Parliament election ===
The Scottish Parliament general election of 3 May 2007 saw McConnell re elected as the MSP for Motherwell and Wishaw with a majority of 5,938 votes, representing 48% of the vote with a turnout of 50.3%. The Labour Party in Scotland was defeated by the SNP with the SNP winning 47 seats to Labour's 46, leaving the SNP short of an overall majority in the Parliament.

==== Resignation ====
McConnell left office as First Minister on 16 May 2007, when the Scottish Parliament elected Alex Salmond as his successor. On 17 May 2007, the Scottish National Party (SNP) officially formed the first nationalist Scottish Government and McConnell became Leader of the Opposition.

On 17 May 2007, McConnell told Salmond he would abstain in a Parliament vote to appoint ministers. In his first speech as opposition leader, McConnell listed a series of 'hypocritical' remarks that SNP ministers had made about the Labour administration.

My predecessor had problems over a muddle. I can only describe Mr Salmond's first decisions as a guddle. He has learned nothing in opposition, despite what he said about doing so. He will regret deprioritising culture, sport and housing, but those who value them will regret it more. Those who want to see action on affordable homes will regret it too.

— McConnell's response to Alex Salmond's administration

As Leader of the Opposition in Holyrood, McConnell took part in First Minister's Questions (FMQs). In one session of FMQs, he claimed the new SNP administration was making several U-turns on transport policy and its position on student debt and council taxes.

On 15 August 2007, McConnell announced his intention to resign as Scottish Labour Leader.

== International relations ==
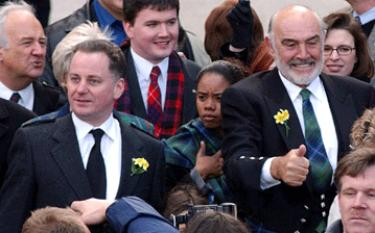
McConnell (left) during Tartan Day in New York City, 2002

During his tenure as first minister, McConnell made visits to the following countries:

- Eight: Belgium (June 2002, July 2003, October 2003, May 2004, September 2004, November 2004, October 2005, March 2007)
- Five: United States (April 2002, April 2004, October 2005, April 2006 and October 2006)
- Four: Republic of Ireland (November 2001, August 2004, September 2006 and November 2006)
- Three: France (February 2004, March 2004 and February 2005)
- Two: Italy (October 2003 and April 2005), Germany (May 2004 and November 2005)
- One: South Africa (August 2002), Austria (November 2003), Greece (August 2004), Netherlands (September 2004), Malawi (April 2005), Australia (March 2006), Canada (October 2005) and China (March 2006)

== See also ==
- First McConnell government
- Second McConnell government
