= First McConnell government =

Scottish Government from 2001 to 2003

- 3rd government of Scotland
- 2001–2003
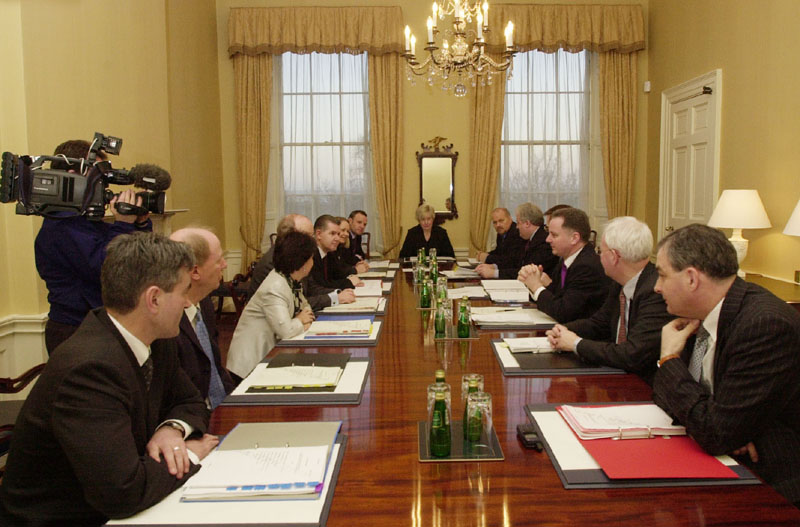
- First meeting of the McConnell cabinet, 2001
- Date established: 27 November 2001
- Date dissolved: 20 May 2003

Leadership and composition
- Monarch: Elizabeth II
- First Minister: Jack McConnell
- Deputy: Jim Wallace
- First Minister's history: MSP for Motherwell and Wishaw (1999–2011); Minister for Finance (1999–2000); Minister for Education, Europe and External Affairs (2001–2001)
- Member parties: Labour Party; Liberal Democrats
- Status in legislature: Majority (coalition)
- Opposition party: Scottish National Party
- Opposition leader: John Swinney
- Budgets: 2002 Scottish budget 2003 Scottish budget

Formation and history
- Incoming formation: 2001 leadership election
- Outgoing election: 2003 Scottish Parliament election
- Legislature term: 1st Scottish Parliament
- Predecessor: McLeish government
- Successor: Second McConnell government

The first McConnell government was formed by Jack McConnell on 27 November 2001 during the 1st Scottish Parliament, following Henry McLeish's resignation as First Minister of Scotland as a consequence of the Officegate scandal. The first McConnell government was a continuation of the Labour–Liberal Democrat coalition that had existed under the previous McLeish and Dewar governments. It ended on 20 May 2003 following the 2003 election to the 2nd Scottish parliament, which saw McConnell returning to office as first minister to form a second government.

== History ==
Henry McLeish resigned as first minister and leader of Scottish Labour in the aftermath of the Officegate scandal, which centred on expenses claimed for his Glenrothes constituency office. McConnell was elected as Labour leader and was nominated for the post of first minister by a vote of the Scottish Parliament on 22 November, defeating Scottish National Party leader John Swinney, Scottish Conservative leader David McLetchie and Independent MSP Dennis Canavan by 70 votes to 34, 19 and 3 respectively.

Shortly after being appointed McConnell began making appointments to his cabinet. Jim Wallace remained in the post of deputy first minister while Cathy Jamieson took over Mr McConnell's education brief and Wendy Alexander and Ross Finnie remained as ministers. Sam Galbraith and Angus MacKay stood down and Jackie Baillie, Sarah Boyack and Tom McCabe reshuffled out of government, while Susan Deacon was offered the post of social justice minister but refused the offer and moved to the backbenches. Cathy Jamieson, Mike Watson, Malcolm Chisholm, Iain Gray, Patricia Ferguson and Andy Kerr were all promoted to cabinet.

Wendy Alexander resigned for her post of Enterprise Minister on 4 May 2002. Her vacancy was filled by Iain Gray, and his post as Social Justice Minister was in turn filled by Margaret Curran, who had been his deputy. Hugh Henry left the post of Deputy Minister for Health and Community Care on 9 May 2002, and took up the post of Deputy Minister for Social Justice. Frank McAveety filled his vacancy. Richard Simpson resigned from his post as Deputy Justice Minister on 26 November 2002, and was replaced by Hugh Henry. Des McNulty filled Henry's vacancy as Deputy Health Minister.

In the 2003 Scottish Parliament election, the Labour–Liberal Democrat coalition was renewed and Jack McConnell returned to a second term as first minister and formed a second administration.

== Cabinet ==
Cabinet
Post	Minister	Portrait	Party	Term
First Minister	The Rt Hon. Jack McConnell MSP		Labour Party	2001–2003
Deputy First Minister	The Rt Hon. Jim Wallace QC MSP		Liberal Democrats	2001–2003
Minister for Justice	The Rt Hon. Jim Wallace QC MSP		Liberal Democrats	2001–2003
Minister for Education and Young People	Cathy Jamieson MSP		Labour Party	2001–2003
Minister for Social Justice	Iain Gray MSP		Labour Party	2001–2002
Minister for Social Justice	Margaret Curran MSP		Labour Party	2002–2003
Minister for Enterprise, Transport and Lifelong Learning	Wendy Alexander MSP		Labour Party	2001–2002
Minister for Enterprise, Transport and Lifelong Learning	Iain Gray MSP		Labour Party	2002–2003
Minister for Culture and Sport	Mike Watson MSP		Labour Party	2001–2003
Minister for Finance and Public Services	Andy Kerr MSP		Labour Party	2001–2003
Minister for Health and Community Care	Malcolm Chisholm MSP		Labour Party	2001–2003
Minister for Parliament	Patricia Ferguson MSP		Labour Party	2001–2003
Minister for the Environment and Rural Development	Ross Finnie MSP		Liberal Democrats	2001–2003
Lord Advocate	The Rt Hon. Colin Boyd QC		Labour Party	2001–2003

== Junior ministers ==
Junior ministers
Post	Minister	Party	Term
Deputy Minister for Culture and Sport	Dr Elaine Murray MSP	Labour Party	2001–2003
Deputy Minister for Education and Young People	Nicol Stephen MSP	Liberal Democrats	1999–2000
Deputy Minister for Enterprise and Lifelong Learning	Dr Lewis Macdonald MSP	Labour Party	2001–2003
Deputy Minister for the Environment and Rural Development	Allan Wilson MSP	Labour Party	2001–2003
Deputy Minister for Finance and Public Services	Peter Peacock MSP	Labour Party	2001–2003
Deputy Ministers for Health and Community Care	Hugh Henry MSP	Labour Party	2001–2002
Deputy Ministers for Health and Community Care	Frank McAveety MSP	Labour Party	2002–2003
Deputy Ministers for Health and Community Care	Mary Mulligan MSP	Labour Party	2001–2003
Deputy Minister for Justice	Dr Richard Simpson MSP	Labour Party	2001–2002
Deputy Minister for Justice	Hugh Henry MSP	Labour Party	2002–2003
Deputy Minister for Parliamentary Business	Euan Robson MSP	Liberal Democrats	2001–2003
Deputy Ministers for Social Justice	Margaret Curran MSP	Labour Party	2001–2002
Deputy Ministers for Social Justice	Hugh Henry MSP	Labour Party	2002
Deputy Ministers for Social Justice	Des McNulty MSP	Labour Party	2002–2003
Solicitor General for Scotland	Elish Angiolini QC	Independent	2001–2003
