= List of Scottish governments =

This is a list of all Scottish Parliaments and Governments (called the Scottish Executive from 1999 until 2008) from the time of the introduction of devolved government for Scotland in 1999.

The first Scottish Government was formed between a coalition agreement between the Scottish Labour Party and Scottish Liberal Democrats, headed by the first minister Donald Dewar from 1999 until his death whilst serving in office in 2000. The incumbent Scottish Government, the Second Swinney government, is a Scottish National Party (SNP) minority government which was formed in May 2026 and is headed by first minister John Swinney.

== List ==
Party key	Labour
Party key	Liberal Democrat
Party key	Scottish Greens
Party key	Scottish National Party

=== 1st Parliament ===
Term	Government	First Minister	Deputy	Parties	Type
1999–2000	Dewar	Donald Dewar	Jim Wallace	Labour	Coalition
1999–2000	Dewar	Donald Dewar	Jim Wallace	Liberal Democrats	Coalition
2000–2001	McLeish	Henry McLeish	Jim Wallace	Labour	Coalition
2000–2001	McLeish	Henry McLeish	Jim Wallace	Liberal Democrats	Coalition
2001–2003	1st McConnell	Jack McConnell	Jim Wallace	Labour	Coalition
2001–2003	1st McConnell	Jack McConnell	Jim Wallace	Liberal Democrats	Coalition
=== 2nd Parliament ===
Term	Government	First Minister	Deputy	Parties	Type
2003–2007	2nd McConnell	Jack McConnell	Jim Wallace	Labour Party	Coalition
2003–2007	2nd McConnell	Jack McConnell	Nicol Stephen	Liberal Democrats	Coalition
=== 3rd Parliament ===
Term	Government	First Minister	Deputy	Parties	Type
2007–2011	1st Salmond	Alex Salmond	Nicola Sturgeon	Scottish National Party	Minority
=== 4th Parliament ===
Term	Government	First Minister	Deputy	Parties	Type
2011–2014	2nd Salmond	Alex Salmond	Nicola Sturgeon	Scottish National Party	Majority
2014–2016	1st Sturgeon	Nicola Sturgeon	John Swinney	Scottish National Party	Majority
=== 5th Parliament ===
Term	Government	First Minister	Deputy	Parties	Type
2016–2021	2nd Sturgeon	Nicola Sturgeon	John Swinney	Scottish National Party	Minority
=== 6th Parliament ===
Term	Government	First Minister	Deputy	Parties	Type
2021–2023	3rd Sturgeon	Nicola Sturgeon	John Swinney	Scottish National Party	Coalition
2021–2023	3rd Sturgeon	Nicola Sturgeon	John Swinney	Scottish Greens	Coalition
2023–2024	1st Yousaf	Humza Yousaf	Shona Robison	Scottish National Party	Coalition
2023–2024	1st Yousaf	Humza Yousaf	Shona Robison	Scottish Greens	Coalition
2024	2nd Yousaf	Humza Yousaf	Shona Robison	Scottish National Party	Minority
2024–2026	1st Swinney	John Swinney	Kate Forbes	Scottish National Party	Minority
=== 7th Parliament ===
Term	Government	First Minister	Deputy	Parties	Type
2026–present	2nd Swinney	John Swinney	Jenny Gilruth	Scottish National Party	Minority

== See also ==
- List of first ministers of Scotland
- List of British governments
- List of Northern Ireland Executives
- List of Welsh Governments
