= McConnell government =

McConnell government may refer to:

- First McConnell government, the Scottish Executive led by Jack McConnell from 2001 to 2003
- Second McConnell government, the Scottish Executive led by Jack McConnell from 2003 to 2007
