= 2000 Labour Party leadership election =

2000 Labour Party leadership election may refer to

- 2000 Scottish Labour leadership election
- 2000 Welsh Labour leadership election
