= Scottish Government Justice and Communities Directorates =

Directorates within the Scottish Government 2007–2010

The Scottish Government Justice and Communities Directorates were a group of Directorates within the Scottish Government 2007–2010.

== History ==
In 2007, the first Salmond government undertook a large reorganisation of the civil service to match a new ministerial structure. The Scottish Executive Justice Department (SEJD) became part of the directorate. The Cabinet Secretary for Justice was Kenny MacAskill, and he has responsibility for criminal justice, police, fire and rescue, courts and civil law in Scotland. MacAskill was supported by the Minister for Community Safety, Fergus Ewing.

In December 2010 there was a further reorganisation and these functions were transferred to the Governance and Communities Directorates and the Learning and Justice Directorates.

== Ministers ==
- Cabinet Secretary for Justice — Kenny MacAskill
- Minister for Community Safety — Fergus Ewing

== Structure ==
It was responsible for the following Executive agencies:

- Accountant in Bankruptcy;
- Scottish Court Service;
- Scottish Prison Service.

== See also ==
- Scots law
- Home Office
- Ministry of Justice
