= McLeish government =

Scottish Government from 2000 to 2001

- 2nd government of Scotland
- 2000–2001
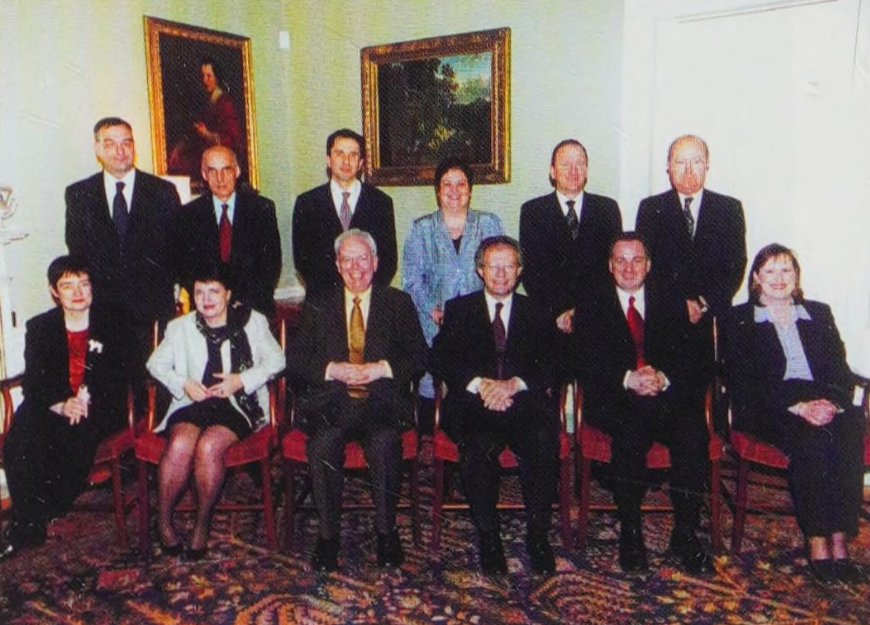
- McLeish and his cabinet at Bute House, 2000
- Date formed: 27 October 2000
- Date dissolved: 8 November 2001

People and organisations
- Monarch: Elizabeth II
- First Minister: Henry McLeish
- First Minister's history: MSP for Central Fife (1999–2003); Minister for Enterprise and Lifelong Learning (1999–2000)
- Deputy First Minister: Jim Wallace
- Member parties: Labour Party; Liberal Democrats
- Status in legislature: Majority (coalition)
- Opposition party: Scottish National Party
- Opposition leader: John Swinney

History
- Incoming formation: 2000 leadership election
- Outgoing formation: 2001 leadership election
- Legislature term: 1st Scottish Parliament
- Budget: 2001 Scottish budget
- Predecessor: Dewar government
- Successor: First McConnell government

Henry McLeish formed the McLeish government on 27 October 2000 following his appointment as the First Minister of Scotland. It followed the death of Donald Dewar on 11 October 2000 during the 1st Scottish Parliament. It was a continuation of the Labour–Liberal Democrat coalition that had been formed following the first election to the Scottish Parliament in 1999.

== Cabinet ==
=== October 2000 to November 2001 ===
Cabinet of Henry McLeish
Portfolio	Portrait	Minister	Term	Party
Cabinet ministers
First Minister		The Rt Hon Henry McLeish MSP	2000–2001	Labour
Deputy First Minister		Jim Wallace QC MSP	1999–2005	Lib Dem
Minister for Justice		Jim Wallace QC MSP	1999–2003	Lib Dem
Minister for Education, Europe and External Affairs		Jack McConnell MSP	2000–2001	Labour
Minister for Enterprise and Lifelong Learning		Wendy Alexander MSP	2000–2001	Labour
Minister for Environment, Sport and Culture		Sam Galbraith MSP	2000–2001	Labour
Minister for Finance and Local Government		Angus Mackay MSP	2000–2001	Labour
Minister for Health and Community Care		Susan Deacon MSP	1999–2001	Labour
Minister for Rural Development		Ross Finnie MSP	1999–2000	Lib Dem
Minister for Social Justice		Jackie Baillie MSP	2000–2001	Labour
Minister for Transport		Sarah Boyack MSP	1999–2001	Labour
Also attending cabinet meetings
Permanent Secretary		Muir Russell	1999–2003	Independent
Minister for Parliament		Tom McCabe MSP	1999–2001	Labour
Lord Advocate		The Rt Hon Colin Boyd QC	2000–2006	Labour

==== Changes ====
- Sam Galbraith resigned from his post of Minister for Environment, Sport and Culture on 20 March 2001. Following his resignation, the environment portfolio was combined with that of rural development, planning was added to the transport portfolio, and the sport and culture portfolio was given Deputy Minister Allan Wilson without a promotion to minister. In addition, a new post of Deputy Minister for Transport and Planning in line with the expanded transport portfolio. This post was filled by Lewis Macdonald.

== List of ministers ==
=== October 2000 to November 2001 ===
Junior ministers
Post	Minister	Term	Party
Deputy Minister for Education, Europe and External Affairs	Nicol Stephen MSP	2000–2001	Liberal Democrats
Deputy Minister for Social Justice	Margaret Curran MSP	2000–2001	Labour Party
Deputy Minister for Enterprise & Lifelong Learning and Gaelic	Alasdair Morrison MSP	2000–2001	Labour Party
Deputy Minister for Highlands and Islands and Gaelic	Alasdair Morrison MSP	2000–2001	Labour Party
Deputy Minister for Culture and Sport	Allan Wilson MSP	2000–2001	Labour Party
Deputy Minister for Finance and Local Government	Peter Peacock MSP	2000–2001	Labour Party
Deputy Minister for Health and Community Care	Malcolm Chisholm MSP	2000–2001	Labour Party
Deputy Minister for Justice	Iain Gray MSP	2000–2001	Labour Party
Deputy Minister for Parliament	Tavish Scott MSP	2000–2001	Liberal Democrat
Deputy Minister for Parliament	Euan Robson MSP	2000–2001	Liberal Democrats
Deputy Minister for Rural Development	Rhona Brankin MSP	2000–2001	Labour Party
Deputy Minister for Transport and Planning	Lewis Macdonald MSP	2000–2001	Labour Party
Solicitor General for Scotland	Neil Davidson QC	2000–2001	Labour Party

==== Changes ====
Tavish Scott resigned from his post of Deputy Minister for Parliament on 9 March 2001. He was replaced by Euan Robson.
