= 2000 SQA grading controversy =

School exam marking controversy in Scotland

The introduction of the reformed examination system in Scotland in 2000 was criticised in the press and by the Government after a series of administrative and computer errors led to several thousand incorrect Higher and Intermediate certificates being sent out by post. The crisis took several months to resolve, and several management figures including the chief executive, Ron Tuck, resigned or lost their jobs as a result.

== Background ==
The Scottish Qualifications Authority announced "teething problems" with the marking system on 9 August 2000, but promise: that students would receive their results on time. The Scottish Qualifications Authority publicly admitted that pupils sitting Higher Grade examinations possibly would not receive the correct results.

== Events ==
=== Initial events ===
Thousands of students across Scotland received incomplete or inaccurate exam results on 10 August 2000. Schools are left in disarray as 5% of all schools have not been sent any results at all, accurate or otherwise. Ron Tuck, the chief executive of the Scottish Qualifications Authority, resigned on 12 August 2000, stating his regret and accepting responsibility for "this unfortunate episode". The Dewar government initially ignored demands by the Scottish National Party and Scottish Conservatives for Sam Galbraith, the Education Minister, to resign.

=== Continuing crisis ===
The Scottish Qualifications Authority and the Scottish Executive claimed that the errors are due to the correct results being incorrectly collated, due to a serious fault in the new software, not exams being marked incorrectly in the first place.

Bill Morton was appointed as acting chief executive on 14 August 2000, replacing Ron Tuck, who resigned.

SQA assured students that their marks would not go down. On 18 August, UCAS admitted in a statement that many of the students whose certificates contained errors on could lose out on a university place that they would have received had the results been accurate and on time. The Scottish Executive announced that it would fund additional places.

=== Resolution ===
On 20 August, the Scottish Qualifications Authority claimed that over 2,000 students with inaccurate certificates will receive the correct ones the next day, and the rest would be fixed "in a matter of days.' No letters arrived by 21 August, but on 22 August the Scottish Qualifications Authority vowed to resolve the worst affected pupils' results by 20 September 2000. The SQA finished its compilation of the missing CSYS and Higher results on 27 August 2026. On 30 August, the SQA announced that that certain schools had received the incorrect information regarding the errors in the results of their students. Roughly 4,264 Standard Grade students were discovered to have received incorrect certificates on 31 August.

== Further developments ==
Bill Morton announced an internal review of the SQA on 29 August.

The Scottish Parliament education committee conducted an investigation of the Scottish Qualifications Authority. The report following the investigation described the board of the SQA as "negligent".

On 29 October, Jack McConnell became the new Education Minister and Sam Galbraith became Environment Minister.

On 31 October, additional reporting revealed Scottish Qualifications Authority failed to sort out non-urgent Higher Grade exam results within the planned deadline—and the new Chief Executive was not told. Jack McConnell appointed a new Scottish Qualifications Authority board on 9 November: 16 of the 24 members were replaced. On 3 November the chairman resigned. The Scottish Qualifications Authority begins sending out accurate exam certificates to students—three months after they were supposed to be delivered.

Galbraith survived a motion of no confidence in the Scottish Parliament on 13 December, the first to be voted on in the Parliament. The motion was defeated by 66 votes against, with 52 MSPs voting in favour and one abstaining. Media reports suggest that the exam results fiasco cost the people of Scotland over £11,000,000.

It emerged that an eighteen-year-old student decided to sue the Scottish Qualifications Authority for compensation after she spent her time retaking a subject she had passed in, but wasn't notified about it until nine months later.
