= McCrone Agreement =

Agreement about Scottish teachers' pay and conditions

The McCrone Agreement (A Teaching Profession for the 21st Century: Agreement reached following recommendations made in the McCrone Report) is an agreement about Scottish teachers' pay and conditions. The agreement, under the Labour-Liberal Democrat coalition government in 2001, followed an independent committee of inquiry which reviewed teachers' pay and conditions, chaired by Professor Gavin McCrone.

One of the key aims of the agreement was to ensure that teachers' working weeks would be limited to 35 hours though there is evidence that this has not been achieved.

== See also ==
- Education in Scotland
