= Officegate =

Scottish political scandal

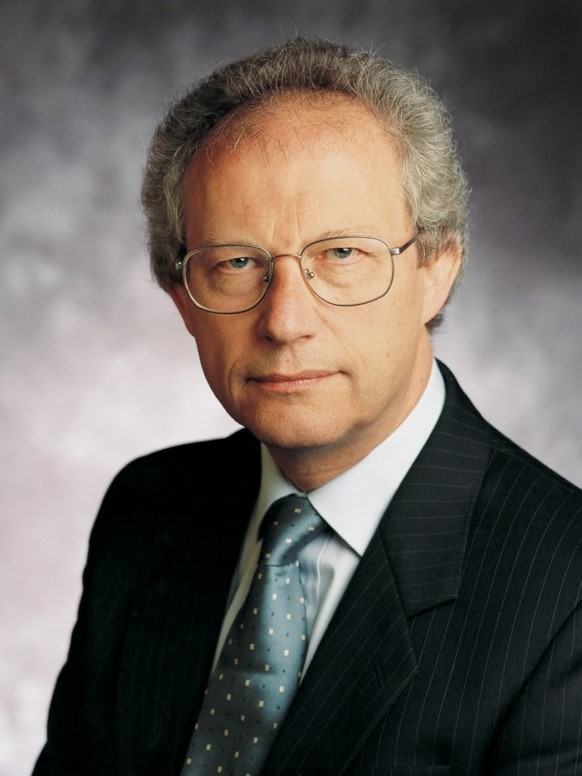
Henry McLeish served as the First Minister of Scotland from 2000 until his resignation in 2001 as a result of the political scandal.

Officegate (Note: For etymology of the -gate suffix, see List of -gate scandals and controversies) was a political scandal in Scotland surrounding the unregistered expenses of the then-First Minister of Scotland, Henry McLeish, in 2001. It was the first major scandal the Scottish Parliament had faced since its reincarnation two years prior in 1999. The scandal dominated McLeish's final months in office and resulted in his resignation.

== Background ==
In the 1987 General Election, McLeish was elected to Westminster to serve as the Member of Parliament (MP) for Central Fife, where he took control of offices on Hanover Court, Glenrothes. The offices were too big and he sublet parts of the first floor. However, McLeish failed to declare the income from the sub lets to the House of Common's register of interests as he had "forgot". In early 2001, a newspaper reported that McLeish had received rent for 5 years from a solicitors firm, Digby Brown. Following the report, he registered the sub let with the House of Commons, however, Dominic Grieve, a Conservatives spokesman, later wrote to Elizabeth Filkin, the House of Commons Commissioner on Standards. The issue then became dormant as McLeish ceased to be an MP after the 2001 general election.

There were continuing claims he should resign, mainly from the Scottish National Party who claimed the issue questioned his integrity. McLeish rebutted the charges against him, claiming that the issue was "a muddle, not a fiddle". Despite appearing to have support from Scottish Labour and the Scottish Liberal Democrats, he resigned on 8 November. He was replaced by Jack McConnell, who was elected unopposed to the leadership of Scottish Labour and was then elected First Minister by MSPs after securing the support of the Scottish Liberal Democrats.

== Timeline of the Officegate scandal ==
- June 1987: McLeish becomes MP for Central Fife, where he takes control of a big office in Glenrothes. He sublets part of his office, but fails to register his expenses with the House of Commons.
- 1998: Digby Brown, a law firm, pays £4,000 a year to McLeish for sub letting part of his constituency office.
- Early 2001: A newspaper reveals he has received expenses from the law firm and Conservative MP Dominic Grieve writes to Elizabeth Filkin, the House of Commons Commissioner on Standards.
- 22 April 2001: Filkin writes to McLeish regarding the controversy. His spokesperson states "the matter has been dealt with. The income in question was not for Mr McLeish's personal use, it went straight into covering the costs of running the office." The matter is laid to rest as he is no longer a Member of Parliament.
- October 2001: Questions begin to arise surrounding McLeish's undeclared expenses.
- 23 October 2001: McLeish states in a statement that he has paid £9,000 to the Fees Office at the House of Commons.
- 25 October 2001: Presiding Officer of the Scottish Parliament, David Steel, bans MSPs from questioning McLeish over his expenses as it is a matter for the Westminster Parliament.
- 28 October 2001: The Fife Constabulary launches an investigation into complaints against McLeish.
- 1 November 2001: McLeish appears on BBC TV's Question Time and admits "he did not know the total sum of money involved from sub letting his constituency office". The interview is seen as a disaster by analysts.
- 2 November 2001: The Leader of the Scottish National Party, John Swinney, calls for McLeish to resign after his "humiliating" interview.
- 6 November 2001: McLeish claims his controversy as an "honest mistake" and offers to pay back £27,000 to House of Commons authorities, after it emerged the total rental income for sub letting the office since 1987 was over £36,000.
- 7 November 2001: McLeish cancels all planned engagements. A survey reveals a majority favour his resignation, 77% to 23%.
- 8 November 2001: McLeish tenders his resignation as First Minister, writing to the Presiding Officer: "I am writing to advise you formally that I have today written to Her Majesty, in accordance with Section 45(2) of the Scotland Act, to tender my resignation as first minister.

== See also ==
- List of political scandals in the United Kingdom
