= Minister for Victims & Community Safety =

Portfolio in the Scottish Government

Minister for Victims and Community Safety
- Scottish Gaelic: Ministear airson Luchd-fulaing agus Sàbhailteachd Coimhearsnachd

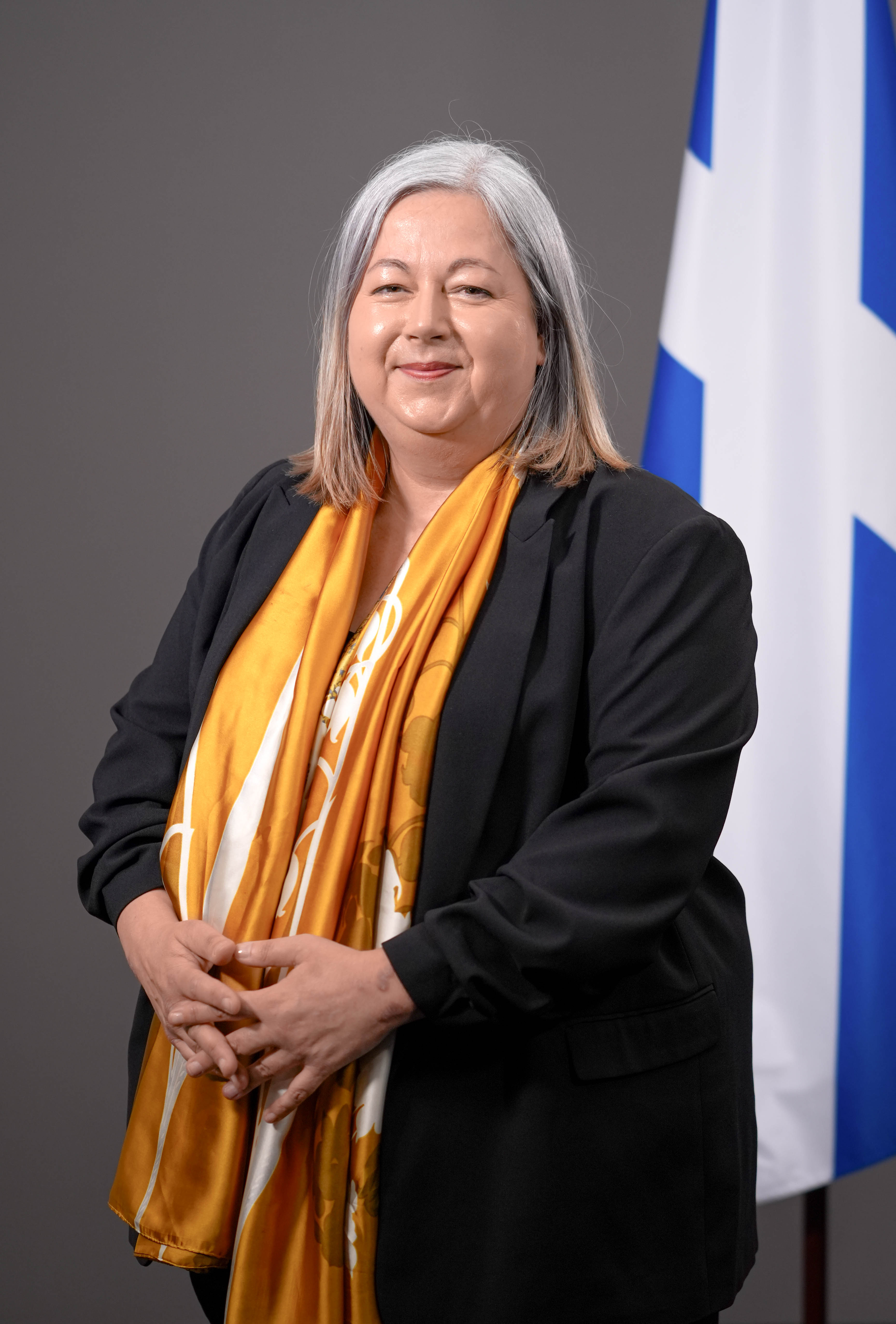
- Incumbent; Kirsten Oswald since 21 May 2026
- Style: Minister (within parliament); Community Safety Minister (informal); Scottish Community Safety Minister (outwith Scotland)
- Member of: Scottish Parliament; Scottish Government
- Reports to: Scottish Parliament
- Seat: Edinburgh
- Appointer: First Minister
- Inaugural holder: Angus MacKayDeputy Minister for Justice
- Formation: 19 May 1999
- Salary: £106,185 per annum (2024) (including £72,196 MSP salary)
- Website: www.gov.scot

The Minister for Victims and Community Safety is a Junior ministerial post in the Scottish Government. As a result, the minister does not attend the Scottish Cabinet. The post was created in May 1999 during the 1st Scottish Parliament as the Deputy Minister for Justice. Deputy ministers were renamed ministers after the election of the Scottish National Party in 2007. The minister reports to the Cabinet Secretary for Justice and Home Affairs, who has overall responsibility for the portfolio, and is a member of cabinet.

== Overview ==
The Minister for Community Safety has specific responsibility for:

- Community safety
- Access to justice
- Anti-sectarianism
- Anti-social behaviour
- Civil law
- fire and rescue services
- Liquor licensing
- Legal profession

== History ==
From 1999 to 2007 responsibility for Community Safety rested with the Minister for Justice and the Deputy Minister for Justice. The Salmond government, elected following the 2007 Scottish Parliament election created the junior post of the Minister for Community Safety who assists the Cabinet Secretary for Justice, in the Scottish Justice Department. After the 2011 Scottish Parliament election the post was renamed Minister for Community Safety and Legal Affairs and was given additional responsibilities for tackling sectarianism. It was renamed again to simply Minister for Community Safety in June 2018.

== List of office holders ==
The incumbent Minister for Victims and Community Safety is Kirsten Oswald MSP who was appointed by First Minister John Swinney to the role on 21 May 2026.

=== Deputy Minister for Justice ===
Name	Portrait	Entered office	Left office	Party	First Minister
Angus MacKay		19 May 1999	2 November 2000	Labour	Donald Dewar
Iain Gray		2 November 2000	28 November 2001	Labour	Henry McLeish
Richard Simpson		28 November 2001	26 November 2002	Labour	Jack McConnell
Hugh Henry		28 November 2002	14 November 2006	Labour	Jack McConnell
Johann Lamont		16 November 2006	17 May 2007	Labour	Jack McConnell
=== Minister for Community Safety ===
Fergus Ewing		17 May 2007	20 May 2011	Scottish National Party	Alex Salmond
=== Minister for Community Safety and Legal Affairs ===
Roseanna Cunningham		20 May 2011	21 November 2014	Scottish National Party	Alex Salmond
Paul Wheelhouse		21 November 2014	18 May 2016	Scottish National Party	Nicola Sturgeon
Annabelle Ewing		18 May 2016	26 June 2018	Scottish National Party	Nicola Sturgeon
=== Minister for Community Safety ===
Ash Regan		27 June 2018	27 October 2022	Scottish National Party	Nicola Sturgeon
Elena Whitham		3 November 2022	29 March 2023	Scottish National Party	Nicola Sturgeon
=== Minister for Victims and Community Safety ===
Siobhian Brown		29 March 2023	20 May 2026	Scottish National Party	Humza Yousaf
Siobhian Brown		29 March 2023	20 May 2026	Scottish National Party	John Swinney
Kirsten Oswald		21 May 2026	Incumbent	Scottish National Party	John Swinney

== See also ==
- Scottish Parliament
- Question Time
- Scottish Government
