= Angus MacKay (Scottish politician) =

Scottish politician (born 1964)

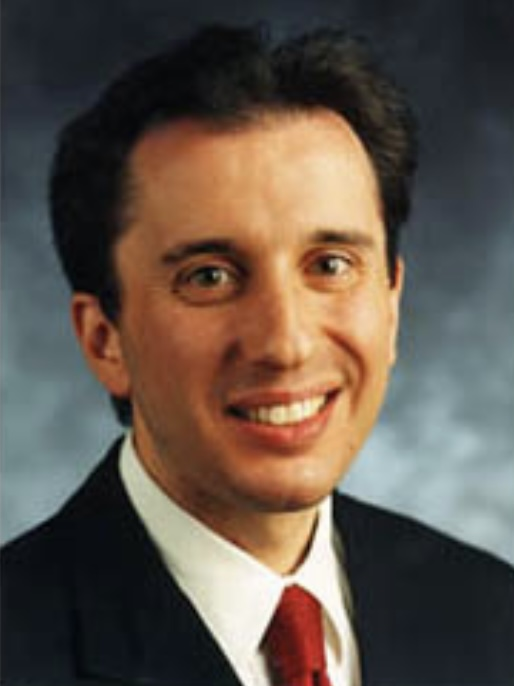
- Official portrait, 1999

Minister for Finance and Local Government
- In office 2 November 2000 – 28 November 2001
- First Minister: Henry McLeish
- Preceded by: Jack McConnell
- Succeeded by: Andy Kerr

Member of the Scottish Parliament for Edinburgh South
- In office 6 May 1999 – 31 March 2003
- Preceded by: Constituency established
- Succeeded by: Mike Pringle

Personal details
- Born: 10 September 1964 (age 61) Edinburgh, Scotland
- Party: Scottish Labour Party

Angus MacKay (born 10 September 1964) is a Scottish politician who served as Minister for Finance and Local Government from 2000 to 2001. A member of the Scottish Labour Party, he was the Member of the Scottish Parliament (MSP) for the Edinburgh South constituency from 1999 to 2003.

Born in Edinburgh, MacKay graduated from the University of Edinburgh with a MA in Politics and Modern History. Before entering politics, he worked for Shelter Scotland and served as parliamentary researchers to Adam Ingram and Mo Mowlam, and was political adviser to Henry McLeish. In the 1995 Scottish local election, MacKay was elected to the City of Edinburgh council, and was later appointed Convenor of Finance in the council's committee in 1997. He stood down as a councillor following his election to the Scottish Parliament in the 1999 election.

Donald Dewar appointed MacKay Deputy Minister for Justice under Dewar's administration. Deputising for Jim Wallace, MacKay had particular responsibility for land reform and coordination of the Scottish Executive's drugs policy. Calls for his resignation were made after he claimed the sex offenders register in Scotland was a matter reserved for Westminster. In May 2000, he revealed the Scottish Executive's ten year plan to tackle the drug crisis in Scotland, with an aim to younger drug takers as a young as 11. Following the death of Dewar, McLeish was appointed First Minister and he appointed MacKay to cabinet as Minister for Finance and Local Government.

== Early life ==
=== Education ===
Angus MacKay was born on 10 September 1964 in Edinburgh. He was educated at St Augustine's High School, before attending the University of Edinburgh where he earned an MA (Hons) in Politics and Modern History.

=== Early career ===
MacKay worked for Shelter Scotland from 1987 to 1990. In 1990, he became a parliamentary researcher for Adam Ingram, the MP for East Kilbride, Strathaven and Lesmahagow, and Mo Mowlam, the MP for Redcar. He was then political adviser to Henry McLeish from 1992 to 1995 and then Press Co-ordinator to George Robertson during the 1997 UK General Election.

== Political career ==
=== Early political years ===
MacKay was elected to the City of Edinburgh Council in 1995 and was appointed Convener of Finance in 1997. As Finance Convenor, he had responsibilities for shaping and delivering Edinburgh's annual budget and reviewing expenditure, service delivery and service reform. In 1999, he stood down from local government following his election to the Scottish Parliament.

==== Deputy Minister for Justice; 1999–2000 ====
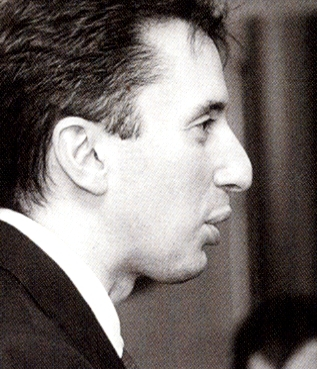
MacKay in 2000

In the first election to the Scottish Parliament in 1999, MacKay was elected to the Edinburgh South constituency. Scottish Labour secured a coalition agreement with the Scottish Liberal Democrats, putting Donald Dewar in the office of First Minister. Dewar appointed MacKay as the Deputy Minister for Justice in his administration. He was deputising for Minister for Justice Jim Wallace and had particular responsibility for land reform and coordination of the Scottish Executive's drugs policy.

In July 2000, calls for MacKay to resign by opposition parties were made after he wrongly claimed the sex offenders register in Scotland was a matter reserved for Westminster. He later admitted it was a devolved issue for which the Executive was responsible for. Lyndsay McIntosh, the Scottish Conservative's deputy home affairs spokeswoman, called for his resignation, stating: "I think Mr MacKay has to consider his position... If he doesn't know the scope of the job and doesn't know his responsibilities then perhaps someone else should be doing the job". MacKay rejected calls for his resignation and focused on plans to introduce tougher guidelines on the monitoring of sex offenders. He said that from there would be a better system of information-sharing for police, councils and social workers and "the guidance will include advice on how these bodies can carry out risk assessments, not just of offenders on the register, but on other individuals with a previous conviction for a sex offence, or individuals suspected of such activities, who are giving cause for concern".

As Deputy Minister for Justice, MacKay also had responsibility for drug policy. Following a trip from New York, United States, in May 2000, he unveiled the Scottish Executive's ten year plan to tackle the drug crisis in Scotland. Despite the launch of his new anti-drug campaign, the Executive failed to increase spending on tackling drugs. MacKay revealed the campaign would aim to young drug takers as young as eleven. "What we have to remember is that drugs and the drugs dealers are a very organised lot and they go out to recruit new customers at a very young age," he stated. MacKay added that the Executive was working hard to produce legislation allowing the assets of known drug dealers to be seized, but new legislation would have to be in line with the European Convention on Human Rights.

=== Minister for Finance; 2000–2001 ===
Following the death of Donald Dewar in 2000, MacKay served as campaign manager for Henry McLeish in his bid for the leadership of the Labour Party in Scotland and First Minister. McLeish's campaign was successful, defeating Jack McConnell in the contest. He formed his administration and appointed MacKay as the Minister for Finance and Local Government, replacing McConnell.

When McLeish resigned in 2001, McConnell was elected as his replacement unopposed. In McConnell's first cabinet reshuffle, MacKay was sacked from Cabinet.

=== Out of government ===
In the 2003 Scottish Parliament election, MacKay was not re-elected after being defeated by the Liberal Democrat candidate Mike Pringle.

== Post-political career ==
In 2003, MacKay, with Gail Hannah, founded MacKay Hannah Ltd in Edinburgh "to Influence policy making, Inform policy development, Connect with decision makers and build Networks."

Scottish Parliament
New parliament Scotland Act 1998	Member of the Scottish Parliament for Edinburgh South; 1999–2003	Succeeded by Mike Pringle
Political offices
Preceded by Jack McConnell as Minister for Finance	Minister for Finance and Local Government; 2000–2001	Succeeded by Andy Kerr as Minister for Finance and Public Services
New office	Deputy Minister for Justice; 1999–2000	Succeeded by Iain Gray
