= Tom McCabe (politician) =

British politician (1954–2015)

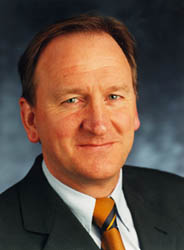
- McCabe as a government minister

Minister for Finance and Public Service Reform
- In office 4 October 2004 – 17 May 2007
- First Minister: Jack McConnell
- Preceded by: Andy Kerr
- Succeeded by: John Swinney

Minister for Parliament
- In office 17 May 1999 – 8 November 2001
- First Minister: Donald Dewar; Henry McLeish
- Preceded by: Position established
- Succeeded by: Patricia Ferguson

Member of the Scottish Parliament for Hamilton South
- In office 6 May 1999 – 22 March 2011
- Preceded by: Constituency established
- Succeeded by: Constituency abolished

Personal details
- Born: 28 April 1954 Hamilton, Lanarkshire, Scotland
- Died: 19 April 2015 (aged 60) Hamilton, Lanarkshire, Scotland
- Party: Scottish Labour Party
- Spouse: Shuming Kong
- Children: Pauline and Ava
- Education: Bell College of Technology
- Occupation: Social worker

Thomas McCabe (28 April 1954 – 19 April 2015) was a Scottish politician who served as Minister for Parliament from 1999 to 2001 and Minister for Finance and Public Service Reform from 2004 to 2007. A member of the Scottish Labour Party, he was Member of the Scottish Parliament (MSP) for the Hamilton South constituency from 1999 to 2011.

== Background ==
McCabe was educated at St. Martin's Secondary School, Hamilton, and obtained a Diploma in Public Sector Management from Bell College of Technology, Hamilton.

He worked for Hoover plc (Cambuslang) from 1974 to 1993, and then in social work with Strathclyde Regional Council and North Lanarkshire Council. He was elected to serve as a councillor for Hamilton District Council and became its leader, then served as the first leader of South Lanarkshire Council when it was created in 1996 after a reform of local government.

== Member of the Scottish Parliament ==
McCabe was elected to the Scottish Parliament for Hamilton South in 1999. As this was the first constituency to declare its results, he was the first ever MSP to be elected.

He was first appointed Minister for Parliament in the Scottish Executive from 1999 to 2001. Following Jack McConnell's appointment as First Minister he was out of office until after the 2003 Scottish Parliament election, when he returned as Deputy Minister for Health and Community Care. In October 2004 he was promoted to Minister for Finance and Public Service Reform in place of Andy Kerr.

In March 2005 he set up the AEWG (Adult Entertainment Working Group), the Scottish advisory body set up within the Scottish Executive to investigate the legislative issues involved in the current proposed lapdancing ban in Scotland. The ban is currently opposed by such figures as Veronica Deneuve and the union group IUSW (the International Union of Sex Workers) a member of the GMB union.

McCabe was one of several Labour casualties following the elections on 5 May 2011, losing his seat to Christina McKelvie of the SNP in the newly formed Hamilton, Larkhall and Stonehouse constituency.

== Personal life ==
McCabe previously had a relationship with former Labour spin-doctor and journalist Lorraine Davidson.

McCabe died from cancer in April 2015, after a period of illness. A new residential street in Hamilton was named in his honour two years after his death.

Scottish Parliament
New constituency	Member of the Scottish Parliament for Hamilton South; 1999–2011	Constituency abolished
Political offices
Preceded by Andy Kerr as Minister for Finance and Public Services	Minister for Finance and Public Service Reform; 2004–2007	Succeeded by John Swinney as Cabinet Secretary for Finance and Sustainable Growth
Preceded by Hugh Henry	Deputy Minister for Health and Community Care; 2003–2004	Succeeded by Lewis Macdonald
New office	Minister for Parliament; 1999–2001	Succeeded by Patricia Ferguson
