= Register of interests =

Record of financial interests of an organization's members

A Register of Interests is a record kept, usually by a government body, of financial interests of its members. The register documents interests which may potentially unethically or unlawfully influence members' official duties.

The term is in use in most Commonwealth countries.

== Jurisdiction ==
=== Australia ===
In 2019 Australia, it required "MPs to declare shares, directorships, real estate, gifts and more to demonstrate they represent their constituents without bias."

=== United Kingdom ===
The UK has had a register of interests since 1974. The UK register was reviewed and enhanced after the Cash for Questions scandal of 1994. This led to the Nolan enquiry which gave birth to the Report on Standards in Local Government. All holders of public office in the UK are bound to this code. The Parliamentary Register has evolved in latter years a Code of Conduct, and as of 2017, had also evolved into:

- Register of Members' Financial Interests
- Register of Interests of Members' Secretaries and Research Assistants
- Register of Journalists' Interests
- Register of All-Party Parliamentary Groups
