= Minister for Enterprise and Lifelong Learning =

Scottish cabinet position

The Minister for Enterprise and Lifelong Learning was a cabinet position in the Scottish Executive. The position was first created in the 1999 as part of the Dewar government and continued into the McLeish cabinet. Following the election of Jack McConnell as First Minister in 2003 transportation was added to the portfolio in his first cabinet and then subsequently removed in his second. Following the election of the SNP government under Alex Salmond the responsibility of the post was divided, with Enterprise portfolio given to the Cabinet Secretary for Finance and Sustainable Growth and lifelong learning to the Cabinet Secretary for Education and Lifelong Learning.

== List of office holders ==
=== Minister for Enterprise and Lifelong Learning ===
| Name | Entered office | Left office | Party |
|---|---|---|---|
| Henry McLeish | 19 May 1999 | 26 October 2000 | Labour |
| Wendy Alexander | 1 November 2000 | 28 November 2001 | Labour |
=== Minister for Enterprise, Transport and Lifelong Learning ===
| Wendy Alexander | 28 November 2001 | 3 May 2002 | Labour |
| Iain Gray | 28 November 2001 | 1 May 2003 | Labour |
=== Minister for Enterprise and Lifelong Learning ===
| Name | Entered office | Left office | Party |
| Jim Wallace | 21 May 2003 | 27 June 2005 | Liberal Democrats |
| Nicol Stephen | 27 June 2005 | 17 May 2007 | Liberal Democrats |

== See also ==
- List of Scottish Governments
