= 2000 Scottish Labour leadership election =

← 1998	11 – 22 October 2000	2001 →
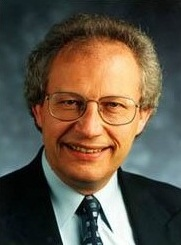

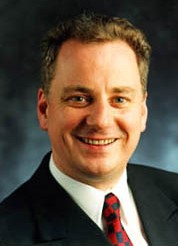
Candidate	Henry McLeish	Jack McConnell
Popular vote	44	36
Leader before election
Donald Dewar
Elected Leader
Henry McLeish

The 2000 Scottish Labour leadership election was an internal party election to choose a new leader of the Labour Party in the Scottish Parliament, and was triggered following the death of Donald Dewar, the inaugural leader and first minister of Scotland. Henry McLeish successfully defeated Jack McConnell, by 44 to 36 votes, and was subsequently appointed to office.

== Background ==
In the 1997 UK general election, Tony Blair's Labour Party won a landslide victory and he formed a majority government, with Dewar as Secretary of State for Scotland. He was task forced with the responsibility of re-establishing a devolved parliament in Scotland and created the Scotland Act 1998. In the first election to the Scottish Parliament in 1999, the Labour Party in Scotland emerged as the largest party and later formed a coalition with the Scottish Liberal Democrats. Dewar was subsequently appointed as the inaugural first minister of Scotland. He also served as the first leader of the Labour Party in Scotland. Dewar died in office, triggering the election.

== Campaign ==
Jack McConnell, the finance minister, announced his candidacy for leader on 19 October. In a statement to the media he outlined his key commitments including retaining social justice as the number one priority and purpose, leading without fear of favour in an open and democratic style, putting equality at the centre of all matters. building a partnership with the party to win elections, working with Labour councillors to improve local services, and keeping the parties of opposition "where they belong - in opposition". McConnell received pressure by Chancellor Gordon Brown not to stand, giving McLeish an unopposed contest, but he issued a "keep out" warning to Westminster.

Henry McLeish, the enterprise and lifelong learning, served as an informal "deputy", working with Dewar on the Scotland Act, announced his candidacy less than 24 hours after Dewar's funeral. McLeish stated he was confident he could lead the government to "electoral success" and he promised to carry Dewar's vision forward, something he described as the "unfinished business". He was seen as the most experienced candidate, having served in both the UK and Scottish Cabinets. However, McLeish lacked the "common touch" and support of backbench MSPs.

== Candidates ==
Candidate	Political office	Date Declared	Campaign progression	Ref.
Jack McConnell	Minister for Finance (1999–2000) General Secretary of the Labour Party in Scotland (1992–1998) MSP for Motherwell and Wishaw (1999–2011)	19 October 2000	Defeated	
Henry McLeish	Minister for Enterprise and Lifelong Learning (1999–2000) Minister of State for Scotland (1997–1999) MSP for Central Fife (1999–2003) MP for Central Fife (1987–2001)	19 October 2000	Elected	

== Election process ==
The party's rule is that leaders are elected by an electoral college, consisting of votes by members of the UK Parliament and Scottish Parliament, party members and trade union members. However, in this election only the 27 voting members of the executive committee of the Scottish Labour Party and the 54 Scottish parliamentary Labour group voted in the election. This was because the Scotland Act 1998 constitutes a first minister must be appointed within 28 days resulting in a tight timescale for a leadership race.

The election only elected an interim leader, with the full electoral college confirming the leader at a later date as well as electing a deputy leader.
