= Dewar government =

Scottish Government from 1999 to 2000

- 1st government of Scotland
- 1999–2000
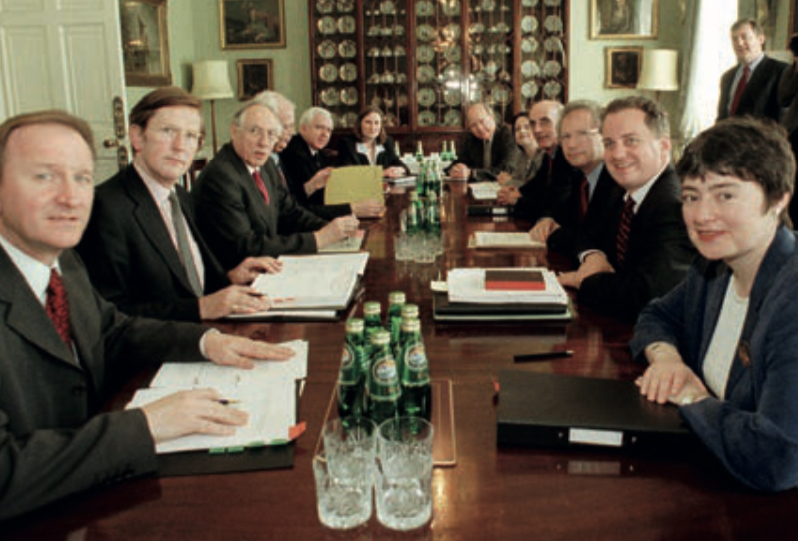
- First meeting of the Dewar cabinet, 1999
- Date formed: 17 May 1999
- Date dissolved: 11 October 2000

People and organisations
- Monarch: Elizabeth II
- First Minister: Donald Dewar
- First Minister's history: 1999–2000
- Deputy First Minister: Jim Wallace
- Member parties: Labour Party; Liberal Democrats
- Status in legislature: Majority (coalition)
- Opposition party: Scottish National Party
- Opposition leader: Alex Salmond (1999–2000); John Swinney (2000)

History
- Outgoing formation: Death of Donald Dewar & 2000 Scottish Labour leadership election
- Election: 1999 Scottish Parliament election
- Legislature term: 1st Scottish Parliament
- Budget: 2000 Scottish budget
- Successor: McLeish government

Donald Dewar formed the Dewar government on 17 May 1999 following his appointment as the inaugural First Minister of Scotland. The first devolved executive of Scotland, it consisted of Scottish Labour and the Scottish Liberal Democrats, who formed a coalition on 14 May 1999. The government dissolved and was succeeded by the McLeish government in the aftermath of Dewar's death on 11 October 2000.

== Cabinet ==
=== May 1999 to October 2000 ===
Cabinet of Donald Dewar
| Portfolio | Portrait | Minister | Term | Party |
|---|---|---|---|---|
Cabinet ministers
| First Minister | | The Rt Hon Donald Dewar MSP | 1999–2000 | Labour |
| Deputy First Minister | | Jim Wallace QC MSP | 1999–2005 | Lib Dem |
| Minister for Justice | | Jim Wallace QC MSP | 1999–2003 | Lib Dem |
| Minister for Finance | | Jack McConnell MSP | 1999–2000 | Labour |
| Minister for Health and Community Care | | Susan Deacon MSP | 1999–2000 | Labour |
| Minister for Communities | | Wendy Alexander MSP | 1999–2000 | Labour |
| Minister for Transport and the Environment | | Sarah Boyack MSP | 1999–2000 | Labour |
| Minister for Enterprise and Lifelong Learning | | Henry McLeish MSP | 1999–2000 | Labour |
| Minister for Rural Affairs | | Ross Finnie MSP | 1999–2000 | Lib Dem |
| Minister for Children and Education | | Sam Galbraith MSP | 1999–2000 | Labour |
Also attending cabinet meetings
| Permanent Secretary | | Muir Russell | 1999–2003 | Independent |
| Chief Whip and Government Business Manager | | Tom McCabe MSP | 1999–2000 | Labour |
| Lord Advocate | | The Rt Hon Colin Boyd QC | 2000–2006 | Labour |

==== Changes ====
- Lord Hardie unexpectedly resigned from his post as Lord Advocate on 17 February 2000. The post was filled by the then Solicitor General, Colin Boyd, who was in turn replaced by Neil Davidson.

== Junior ministers ==
Junior ministers
| Post | Minister | Term | Party |
|---|---|---|---|
| Deputy Minister for Children and Education | Peter Peacock MSP | 1999–2000 | Labour Party |
| Deputy Minister for Culture and Sport | Rhona Brankin MSP | 1999–2000 | Labour Party |
| Deputy Minister for Social Inclusion, Equality and the Voluntary Sector | Jackie Baillie MSP | 1999–2000 | Labour Party |
| Deputy Minister for Local Government | Frank McAveety MSP | 1999–2000 | Labour Party |
| Deputy Minister for Enterprise and Lifelong Learning | Nicol Stephen MSP | 1999–2000 | Liberal Democrats |
| Deputy Minister for Highlands and Islands and Gaelic | Alasdair Morrison MSP | 1999–2000 | Labour Party |
| Deputy Minister for Health and Community Care | Iain Gray MSP | 1999–2000 | Labour Party |
| Deputy Minister for Justice (with particular responsibility for Land Reform) | Angus MacKay MSP | 1999–2000 | Labour Party |
| Deputy Business Manager and Liberal Democrat Whip | Iain Smith MSP | 1999–2000 | Liberal Democrats |
| Deputy Minister for Rural Affairs (with particular responsibility for Fisheries) | John Home Robertson MSP | 1999–2000 | Labour Party |
| Solicitor General for Scotland | Colin Boyd QC | May 1999–Feb. 2000 | Labour Party |
| Solicitor General for Scotland | Neil Davidson QC | Feb. 2000–Oct. 2000 | Labour Party |
