= Henry McLeish =

First minister of Scotland from 2000 to 2001

The Right Honourable Henry McLeish
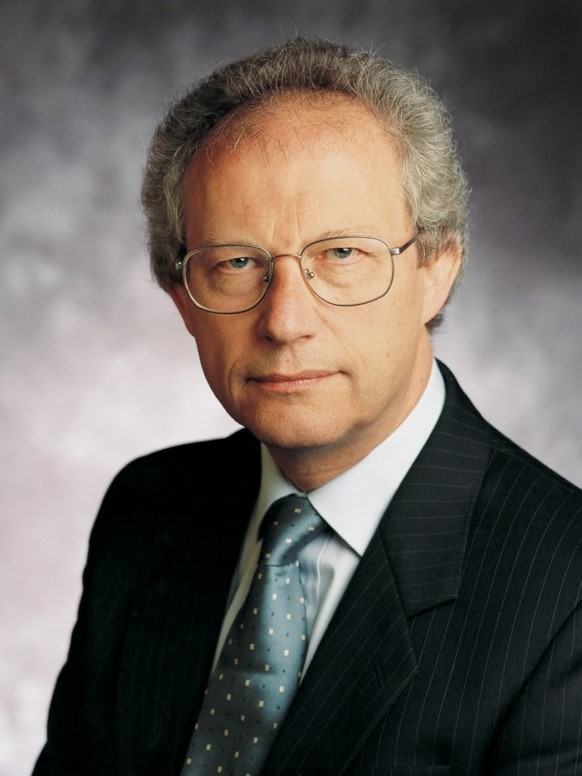
- Official portrait, 2000

First Minister of Scotland
- In office 27 October 2000 – 8 November 2001
- Monarch: Elizabeth II
- Deputy: Jim Wallace
- Preceded by: Donald Dewar (Note: Jim Wallace acted from 11 October 2000 to 27 October 2000)
- Succeeded by: Jack McConnell (Note: Jim Wallace acted from 8 November 2001 to 27 November 2001)

Leader of the Labour Party in the Scottish Parliament (Note: Scottish Labour was known as the Labour Party in Scotland until the 2011 Murphy and Boyack review, when the title was changed to Leader of the Scottish Labour Party.)
- In office 27 October 2000 – 8 November 2001 (Note: Acting: 11 October 2000 – 27 October 2000)
- Deputy: Cathy Jamieson
- UK party leader: Tony Blair
- Preceded by: Donald Dewar
- Succeeded by: Jack McConnell (Note: Cathy Jamieson acted from 8 November 2001 to 22 November 2001)
Ministerial offices
Minister for Enterprise and Lifelong Learning
In office 19 May 1999 – 26 October 2000
First Minister	Donald Dewar; Jim Wallace (Acting)
Preceded by	Position established
Succeeded by	Wendy Alexander
Minister of State for Scotland
In office 6 May 1997 – 29 June 1999
Prime Minister	Tony Blair
Preceded by	James Douglas-Hamilton
Succeeded by	Brian Wilson
Parliamentary offices
Member of the Scottish Parliament for Central Fife
In office 6 May 1999 – 31 March 2003
Preceded by	Constituency established
Succeeded by	Christine May
Member of Parliament for Central Fife
In office 11 June 1987 – 14 May 2001
Preceded by	Willie Hamilton
Succeeded by	John MacDougall

Personal details
- Born: Henry Baird McLeish; 15 June 1948 (age 78) Methil, Fife, Scotland
- Party: Scottish Labour
- Spouses: Margaret Drysdale (m. 1968; died 1995) Julie Fulton (m. 1998; div. 2011) Caryn Nicolson (m. 2012)
- Children: 2
- Parent(s): Harry McLeish (father); Mary Slaven Baird (mother)
- Education: Buckhaven High School, Heriot-Watt University
- Occupation: Politician; Footballer; Author; Academic
- Cabinet: McLeish government
Association football career
- Position: Wing half
Senior career*
Years	Team	Apps	(Gls)
1963	Leeds United	0	(0)
1963–1968	East Fife	83	(2)
International career
1966	Scotland U18	1	
- * Club domestic league appearances and goals

Henry Baird McLeish (born 15 June 1948) is a Scottish politician, author, academic and former professional footballer who served as First Minister of Scotland from 2000 to 2001. With a term of 1 year, 12 days, he is the shortest serving holder of that office. He served as the Leader of the Labour Party in the Scottish Parliament from 2000 to 2001.

Born and raised into a Labour supporting coal mining family in Fife, McLeish dropped out of Buckhaven High School at the age of fifteen to pursue a professional career in football. Playing wing half, he was first signed for Leeds United F.C., but after experiencing homesickness, McLeish returned to his native of Fife to play for East Fife F.C. Making more than 108 appearances, he was one of the youngest ever players to play in Scottish professional football. McLeish's career was cut short after an injury and he returned to education, studying at Heriot-Watt University.

McLeish joined the Labour Party in 1970 and was later elected to the Fife Regional Council, where he served as the council's leader from 1982 to 1987. After several unsuccessful attempts to be elected to the British House of Commons, McLeish was successful in the 1987 general election, when he was elected as member of parliament for Central Fife. He served successively in Labour's opposition benches for ten years, before being appointed minister of state for Scotland under Prime Minister Tony Blair following the party's landslide victory in the 1997 election. McLeish served as Donald Dewar's 'right-hand man' in the Scottish Office and was instrumental in assisting Dewar with the creation of the Scotland Act which established the Scottish Parliament. In the first election to the parliament in 1999, he was elected as a member of the Scottish Parliament for the Central Fife constituency. Following the appointment as Dewar as the inaugural first minister of Scotland, he served in the first Scottish Executive as the minister for enterprise and lifelong learning from 1999 to 2000.

Dewar died in office of a brain haemorrhage on 11 October 2000, which triggered a leadership contest within the Labour Party to find a successor, with McLeish declaring his candidacy. He led a successful and short campaign after defeating finance minister Jack McConnell. McLeish was sworn into office as first minister of Scotland on 26 October 2000. He oversaw the implementation of the McCrone Agreement for teachers in Scotland and strongly advocated free personal care for the elderly scheme. His tenure as first minister was short, as he resigned the following year following a financial scandal referred to as "Officegate"; the first major scandal the Scottish Parliament had faced since its reincarnation two years earlier. He was succeeded by McConnell, who he had beaten in the previous leadership election. McLeish sat as a backbencher, before stepping down as an MSP at the 2003 election.

Since leaving office, McLeish has remained politically active and has written several books. In 2007, he was appointed to the Scottish Broadcasting Commission and the following year he chaired the Scottish Prisons Commission. In the 2014 Scottish independence referendum, he campaigned in favour of remaining in the UK. However, following the Brexit referendum, McLeish stated he would back another Scottish independence referendum if Scotland was taken out of the EU against its wishes.

== Early life and education ==
Henry Baird McLeish was born at 50 Morar Street in Methil, Fife, on 15 June 1948, to Harry McLeish (1923–2009) and Mary Slaven Baird (1925–1985). Born into a "strong Christian socialist influence" household in central Fife, where his father and grandfather worked as coal miners for a private company, McLeish's grandmother was a member of the Labour and Co-operative Party for seventy years. He was named after his maternal grandfather. McLeish grew up on Morar Street, before moving to Institution Row, a miner community, when he was two or three. The family moved to a new housing estate for mineworkers in the old village of Kennoway, where his younger brother Ronald was born.

McLeish was educated at the Buckhaven High School, where he became involved with the school's football team. He met his childhood sweetheart while attending the school, Margaret Drysdale, and they married in 1968. While a pupil at the school, he was "too concerned with football", having been told by his headmaster he had no future in education.

McLeish returned to education following his injury, studying at Heriot-Watt University in Edinburgh from 1968 to 1973. He graduated with a BSc (Hons) in Town Planning. After graduating, McLeish worked as a research officer at Edinburgh Corporation's department of social work from 1973 to 1974, then as a planning officer for Fife County Council from 1974 to 1975 and Dunfermline District Council from 1975 to 1987. He also worked as a part-time lecturer and tutor at Heriot-Watt University from 1973 to 1986.

== Professional football career ==
In 1963, McLeish left school at the age of 15 to become a professional football player. His rector wrote on his school report card: "I am glad the boy is a good footballer as he has no future in education." He was first signed with Leeds United, however, after experiencing homesickness, he returned to Scotland to play for East Fife, where he made 108 appearances. He played wing-half and was one of the youngest ever players to play in Scottish professional football. His first game for East Fife was at Hampden Park against the Glasgow team, Queen's Park.

At the age of 18, McLeish trialled for a Scotland youth national team, playing against a group of footballers from Motherwell, but they lost 5–2. The Daily Record reported on the match and stated McLeish was the only young Scot to impress. He was later selected for the Scotland team to play in the World Youth Cup, hosted by Yugoslavia. McLeish also played for junior football clubs; St Andrews United and Glenrothes Juniors. His footballing career was cut short by a leg injury, and he returned to education.

== Local government and MP (1970–1987) ==
McLeish joined the Scottish Labour Party in 1970 and he became chairman of the Young Socialists. He first contested in an election for the Glenwood ward in Glenrothes but he was beaten by the sitting Scottish Conservative councillor. He began his political career on the Kirkcaldy District Council from 1974 to 1977, serving as the council's planning committee chairman. He later served on the Fife Regional Council 1978 to 1987 and served as the as leader of Fife Regional Council from 1982. As the council leader, he implemented a "municipal socialist" manifesto, proposing free bus passes and TV licences for pensioners.

At the 1979 UK general election, he ran for the East Fife constituency for the British House of Commons. McLeish was unsuccessful, having been placed third, behind the Conservatives' Barry Henderson and the Liberals' Menzies Campbell. In 1981, he began to challenge Willie Hamilton in the Central Fife constituency. Hamilton was a right-wing Labour MP known nationally for his anti-monarchy views. He gave up his attempts to retain his candidacy, allowing McLeish to run in the 1987 election.

== Labour in opposition (1987–1997) ==
The Labour Party failed to defeat Margaret Thatcher's Conservative Party in the 1987 election and McLeish served in several shadow spokesman portfolios, including education and employment from 1988 to 1989 and employment and training from 1989 to 1992. Despite the end of Thatcher's eleven-year tenure, Labour failed again to defeat the incumbent Conservatives, returning to opposition. McLeish served as shadow minister for the Scottish Office from 1992 to 1994.

In 1994, following Tony Blair's election as Leader of the Labour Party, McLeish served successively as the shadow minister for transport from 1994 to 1995, shadow minister for health from 1995 to 1996, and shadow minister for social security from 1996 to 1997.

== 1997 Scottish devolution referendum ==
At the 1997 UK general election, McLeish served as Labour's election campaign director for Scotland. In the election, Labour defeated the Conservatives in a landslide victory. He was appointed by Blair as the Minister of State for Scotland, with responsibility for home affairs and devolution. McLeish worked alongside Donald Dewar on the Scotland Act 1998, which established the Scottish Parliament.

As Dewar's right-hand man in Westminster, McLeish helped secure devolution for Scotland and manoeuvre the Scotland Act through the Westminster Parliament.

== Dewar government (1999–2000) ==
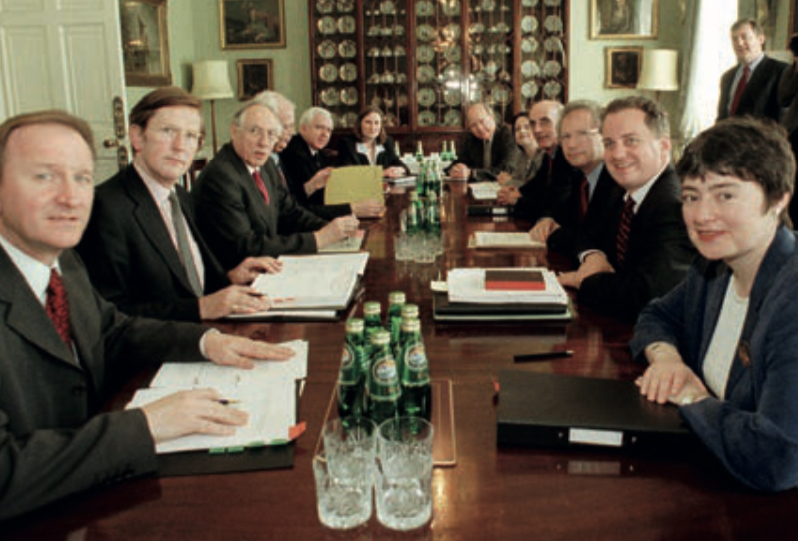
McLeish, third from the right, seated at the first meeting of the Dewar government, 1999

=== Enterprise and Lifelong Learning ===
After the creation of the Scottish Parliament in May 1999, McLeish was elected as MSP for the Fife Central constituency. In the first Scottish government for over 300 years, first minister Donald Dewar appointed McLeish as the Minister for Enterprise and Lifelong Learning. His responsibilities included a commitment to review tuition fees in Scotland which was a key component of the agreement between the Scottish Labour Party and Scottish Liberal Democrats to form the first Scottish Executive. Dewar had been widely expected to be appointed deputy first minister by Dewar, however, Jim Wallace was ultimately appointed as deputy first minister.

=== SQA examinations controversy ===
During his tenure as Minister for Enterprise and Lifelong Learning, McLeish and the Dewar government became embroiled in the 2000 SQA examinations controversy. The introduction in Scotland of the reformed examinations system in 2000 was criticised in the press and by the Government after a series of administrative and computer errors led to several thousand incorrect Higher and Intermediate certificates being sent out by post.

There had been suggestions that both McLeish and his corresponding Minister for Education Sam Galbraith were not informed about the issues, with McLeish later confirming that a process of "vigorous investigation" was underway. It was later confirmed that several senior officials within the Scottish Qualification Authority (SQA) would be facing disciplinary action as a result of the error. BBC News said that both the Chief Executive of the SQA, Ron Tuck, and the Minister for Education, Sam Galbraith, were "kept in the dark" about the problems. It had been announced that concerns were raised months prior to the error being made that exam results would not be ready when expected but assurances continued to be provided that results would be issued on time and when expected.

The crisis took several months to resolve, and several management figures including the Chief Executive, Ron Tuck, resigned or lost their jobs as a result. Bill Morton became the new Chief Executive of the SQA, the organisations third in only five days, and upon his appointment said that the reassessing of exam results was his priority and that of the SQA.

== First Minister of Scotland (2000–2001) ==
=== 2000 Labour leadership bid ===
On 11 October 2000, Dewar died of a brain haemorrhage following a fall outside Bute House the previous day. Deputy First Minister Jim Wallace served as the acting First Minister, until the election of a new leader of Scottish Labour was held after Dewar's funeral. On 19 October, McLeish launched his bid to be the next leader of the Scottish Labour Party, with Jack McConnell later announcing his bid.

The ballot was held amongst a restricted electorate of Labour MSPs and members of Scottish Labour's national executive, because there was insufficient time for a full election to be held. McLeish defeated his rival Jack McConnell by 44 votes to 36 in the race to become the second first minister.

=== Appointment ===
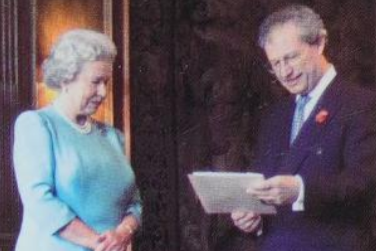
Queen Elizabeth II gives McLeish royal warrant of appointment ahead of his swearing-in as first minister of Scotland the Court of Session.

McLeish was officially sworn into office as first minister of Scotland on 27 October 2000 at the Court of Session in Edinburgh after receiving the Royal Warrant of Appointment by Queen Elizabeth II. The following day, he formed his government, which was a continuation of the Labour-Liberal Democrat coalition.

=== Governmental record ===
Professor John Curtice, a prominent political analyst, commented that McLeish would not have the "kind of authority" that Donald Dewar enjoyed. He travelled widely, particularly in the United States. He managed several task forces designed to improve the competitiveness of Scottish industry, especially the PILOT project for Scottish oil and gas supply chains.

He was embarrassed when an open microphone recorded him with Helen Liddell in a television studio, describing Scottish Secretary John Reid as "a patronising bastard" and said of his colleague, Brian Wilson, "Brian is supposed to be in charge of Africa but he spends most of his time in bloody Dublin. He is a liability".

=== Acts of Parliament ===
Whilst in government serving as first minister, McLeish oversaw and implemented the free personal care for the elderly scheme as well as the implementation of the McCrone Agreement for education teachers in Scotland.

=== International relations ===
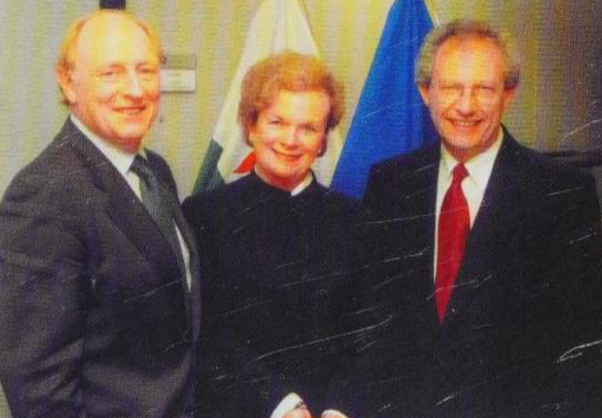
McLeish (right) during a Closer to Europe engagement, 2000

McLeish meets with U.S. President George W. Bush in the Oval Office of the White House, 2001

McLeish travelled to the United States in April 2001 where he met with President of the United States, George W. Bush, in the Oval Office at the White House. The following day, McLeish was criticised over his decision to appointment a Scottish ambassador to Washington D.C. which was described as "a threat to the future of the United Kingdom". McLeish announced that the role of the ambassador in the United States would be largely promoting Scotland and its image in the United States.

The Scottish Executive later confirmed that the official in Washington D.C. would not take on the titles ambassador or consul, and that they would be instructed by the Scottish Executive to work in conjunction with the Embassy of the United Kingdom in Washington D.C.. Christopher Mayer, the British Ambassador to the United States, was consulted on the creation of the position within the Scottish Executive and was said to have "given the role his full support". McLeish pledged that the official would be in place by the end of 2001, and said that the appointment was "about the future and Scotland's continued modernisation as a dynamic, globally-connected nation where opportunity is extended to all and no-one is left out".

During his tenure as first minister, McLeish conducted international visits in six countries – Italy and Belgium in December 2000, the United States in April 2001, a further two visits to Belgium in May and October 2001, Finland in September 2001, and Taiwan and Japan in October 2001.

=== Resignation ===
McLeish resigned as first minister in November 2001, amid a scandal involving allegations he sub-let part of his tax-subsidised Westminster constituency office without it having been registered in the register of interests kept in the Parliamentary office. The press quickly dubbed the scandal "Officegate", and confirmed that McLeish had been sub–letting the office for most of his career whilst at Westminster.

Though McLeish could not have personally benefited financially from the oversight, he undertook to repay the £36,000 rental income, and resigned to allow Scottish Labour a clean break to prepare for the 2003 Scottish Parliament election. During his resignation speech to the Scottish Parliament on 8 November 2001, McLeish admitted wrongdoing in relation to the scandal but was critical of the role the media played in his decision to resign as first minister, stating that he was "surprised and dismayed that my family, friends, staff and colleagues have been brought into matters that are my responsibility alone".

During his resignation address to the parliament, he received a standing ovation from members of his own party before stating that he believed "now was the time for someone else to lead us". McLeish wrote a letter to the Presiding Officer of the Scottish Parliament, David Steel, confirming his resignation and also notified the queen.

Following his resignation as first minister, McLeish continued to serve as the MSP for Central Fife but did not seek re-election at the 2003 election despite seeking support and 12 out of 13 required votes from the constituency Labour Party in 2002 for re–nomination as the candidate for the 2003 election.

== Post-premiership ==
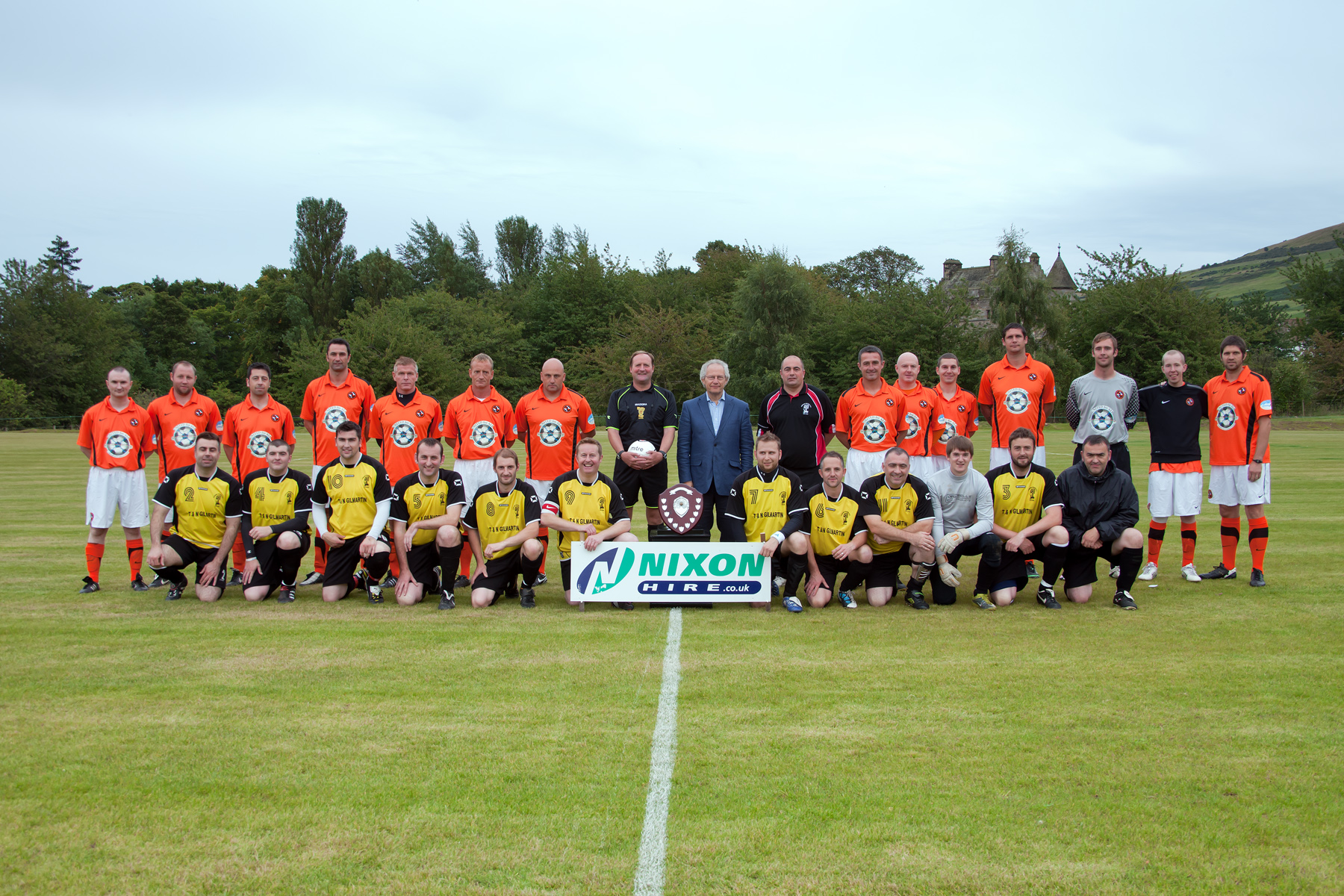
McLeish at a charity football match in 2011

Since leaving mainstream politics, McLeish has lectured widely in the United States, particularly at the United States Air Force Academy and the University of Arkansas, where he holds a visiting professorship shared between the Fulbright College of Arts and Sciences and the University of Arkansas School of Law. He is considered an expert on European-American relations and on the European Union.

In August 2007, he was appointed to the Scottish Broadcasting Commission, established by the Scottish Government. He also chaired the Scottish Prisons Commission, which produced a report into sentencing and the criminal justice system in 2008 entitled "Scotland's Choice". McLeish concluded a "major report" on the state of football in Scotland, which had been commissioned by the Scottish Football Association, in April 2010.

McLeish claimed that Scottish football was "underachieving, under performing and under funded" at a press conference to unveil the report.

== Public image and legacy ==
McLeish's close working relationship with inaugural first minister Donald Dewar meant that, at the time of Dewar's death, McLeish was regarded by many in the Press as Dewar's continuity candidate. A 2000 feature in The Economist described him variably as both "Labour's next most experienced politician" and "too keen to be his [Dewar's] deputy for Mr Dewar's liking".

The same article portrayed McLeish as having a distant relationship with Labour's leader in London, Tony Blair, but with a reputation for being a "moderniser" given his work alongside Donald Dewar in securing devolution. His work on the foundational Devolution Bill secured him the nickname of "Mr. Devolution" in parliament.

In contrast to "Dewar's gregariousness", however, The Economist described McLeish as "a bit of a loner" within the Scottish Parliament, "keeping his head down when there is trouble". The Scotsman described him as a "hard grafter", commenting in length on his former career as a footballer.

Despite denying intentional wrongdoing, McLeish's short tenure and rapid departure from office amid scandal likely dampened his public legacy. His successor, Jack McConnell, appeared keen "to remove the influence of … Henry McLeish" from the Scottish Government by sacking most of his ministerial appointees within days of entering office.

Since resigning as an MSP in 2003, McLeish has kept an active profile within Scotland's print media, writing on politics for The Scotsman, The Herald, and The National.

== Political views ==
=== Scottish devolution ===
As a strong devolutionist, he was one of the original signatories of the claim of right at the inaugural meeting of the 1989 Scottish constitutional convention which paved the way for devolution.

=== Scottish nationalism ===
In the run up to the referendum on Scottish independence on 18 September 2014, there was much media and public speculation towards whether McLeish backed a "No" vote to remain within the United Kingdom, or whether he supported a "Yes" vote in order to create an independent separate sovereign Scotland.

Speculation from the public came from media articles in which McLeish was reported to be talking negatively about the prospect of a "No" vote to remain within the union, but was later reported as stating it would be "near impossible" to vote Yes in the referendum.

Following the 2016 UK referendum on EU membership, in which the majority of the United Kingdom voted to leave the European Union, but the majority of the Scottish electorate voted to remain in the EU, McLeish has since claimed that he would support and campaign for an independent Scottish sovereign state and campaign for it to be a fully functioning member and participate fully within the European Union despite Brexit. In September 2021, he reiterated that he would support independence if the union was not reformed.

== Titles and achievements ==
McLeish also holds the following positions and titles:

- Privy Counsellor
- Hartman Hotz visiting professor in law and the liberal arts, jointly in the Fulbright College and Law School, University of Arkansas
- Visiting professor at the Graduate School of International Studies at the University of Denver
- Visiting lecturer at the United States Air Force Academy, Colorado Springs, Colorado
- Honorary Fellow at the College of Humanities and Social Science at Edinburgh University
- Honorary Fellow at the Cambridge Land Institute, Fitzwilliam College, Cambridge University
- Adviser, Consultant and Facilitator to the European Foundation for the Improvement of Living and Working Conditions and the European Monitoring Centre for Change, Dublin, Republic of Ireland
- Adviser and Consultant to the LEED Programme of the OECD in Paris, France, including visits to Austria, Italy, and Mexico
- Consultant, in partnership with Jeremy Harrison, Cambridge (Public Value Partnership, working on new project development and evaluation of existing projects in the community and voluntary sector)

== Authored books ==
- Scotland First: Truth and Consequences (2004)
- Global Scots: Voices from Afar (with Kenny MacAskill) (2005) (published in the United Kingdom as Global Scots: Making It in the Modern World)
- Wherever the Saltire Flies (with Kenny MacAskill) (2006)
- Scotland: The Road Divides (with Tom Brown) (2007)
- Scotland: A Suitable Case for Treatment (with Tom Brown) (2009)
- Scotland The Growing Divide: Old Nation, New Ideas (with Tom Brown) (2012)
- Rethinking our Politics: The political and constitutional future of Scotland and the UK (2014)
- Citizens United: Taking Back Control in Turbulent Times – Viewpoints (2017)
- Scottish Football: Reviving the Beautiful Game (2018)
- People, Politics, Parliament: The Settled Will of the Scottish People (2022)

== Electoral history ==
=== Scottish Parliament ===
1999 Scottish Parliament election: Central Fife
Party	Candidate	Votes	%	±%
Labour	Henry McLeish	18,828	57.31	N/A
SNP	Tricia Marwick	10,153	30.91	N/A
Liberal Democrats	Jane Ann Liston	1,953	5.94	N/A
Conservative	Keith Harding	1,918	5.84	N/A
Majority		8,675	26.40	N/A
Turnout		32,852		
Labour win (new seat)				

=== UK Parliament ===
General election 1997: Central Fife
Party	Candidate	Votes	%	±%
Labour	Henry McLeish	23,912	58.7	+7.9
SNP	Tricia Marwick	10,199	25.0	−0.1
Conservative	Jacob Rees-Mogg	3,669	9.0	−8.6
Liberal Democrats	Ross Laird	2,610	6.4	−0.5
Referendum	John Scrymgeour-Wedderburn	375	0.9	New
Majority		13,713	33.7	+8.4
Turnout		40,765	69.8	−4.5
Labour hold		Swing		

General election 1992: Central Fife
Party	Candidate	Votes	%	±%
Labour	Henry McLeish	21,036	50.4	−3.0
SNP	Tricia Marwick	10,458	25.1	+10.4
Conservative	Carol Cender	7,353	17.6	+0.9
Liberal Democrats	Craig Harrow	2,892	6.9	−8.3
Majority		10,578	25.3	−11.4
Turnout		41,739	74.3	+1.7
Labour hold		Swing	N/A	

General election 1987: Central Fife
Party	Candidate	Votes	%	±%
Labour	Henry McLeish	22,827	53.4	+10.3
Conservative	Richard Aird	7,118	16.7	−5.8
Liberal	Teresa Little	6,487	15.2	−8.2
SNP	Dan Hood	6,296	14.7	+4.5
Majority		15,709	36.7	+17.0
Turnout		42,728	72.6	+0.1
Labour hold		Swing	+8.0	

General election 1979: East Fife
Party	Candidate	Votes	%	±%
Conservative	Barry Henderson	20,117	43.0	+4.2
Liberal	Menzies Campbell	10,762	23.0	+10.4
Labour	Henry McLeish	9,339	19.9	+3.0
SNP	J. Marshall	6,612	14.1	−17.7
Majority		9,355	20.0	+13.0
Turnout		46,830	79.0	+5.3
Conservative hold		Swing		

== Personal life ==
His first wife Margaret Drysdale, whom he had a son and daughter with, died in 1995 of stomach cancer. He married Julie Fulton, a social worker for Fife Council, on 1 May 1998 in St Andrews. They divorced in 2011. He married Caryn Nicholson on 5 June 2012 at Balbirnie House in Markinch. They live in Falkland, Fife.

== Notes ==
Parliament of the United Kingdom
Preceded by Willie Hamilton	Member of Parliament for Central Fife; 1987–2001	Succeeded by John MacDougall
Scottish Parliament
New parliament Scotland Act 1998	Member of the Scottish Parliament for Central Fife; 1999–2003	Succeeded by Christine May
Political offices
New office	Minister for Enterprise and Lifelong Learning; 1999–2000	Succeeded by Wendy Alexander
Preceded by Jim Wallace; Acting	First Minister of Scotland; 2000–2001	Succeeded by Jim Wallace; Acting
Party political offices
Preceded by Donald Dewar	Leader of the Scottish Labour Party; 2000–2001	Succeeded by Jack McConnell
