= 1st Scottish Parliament =

Legislature elected in 1999

| 2nd Scottish Parliament | → |
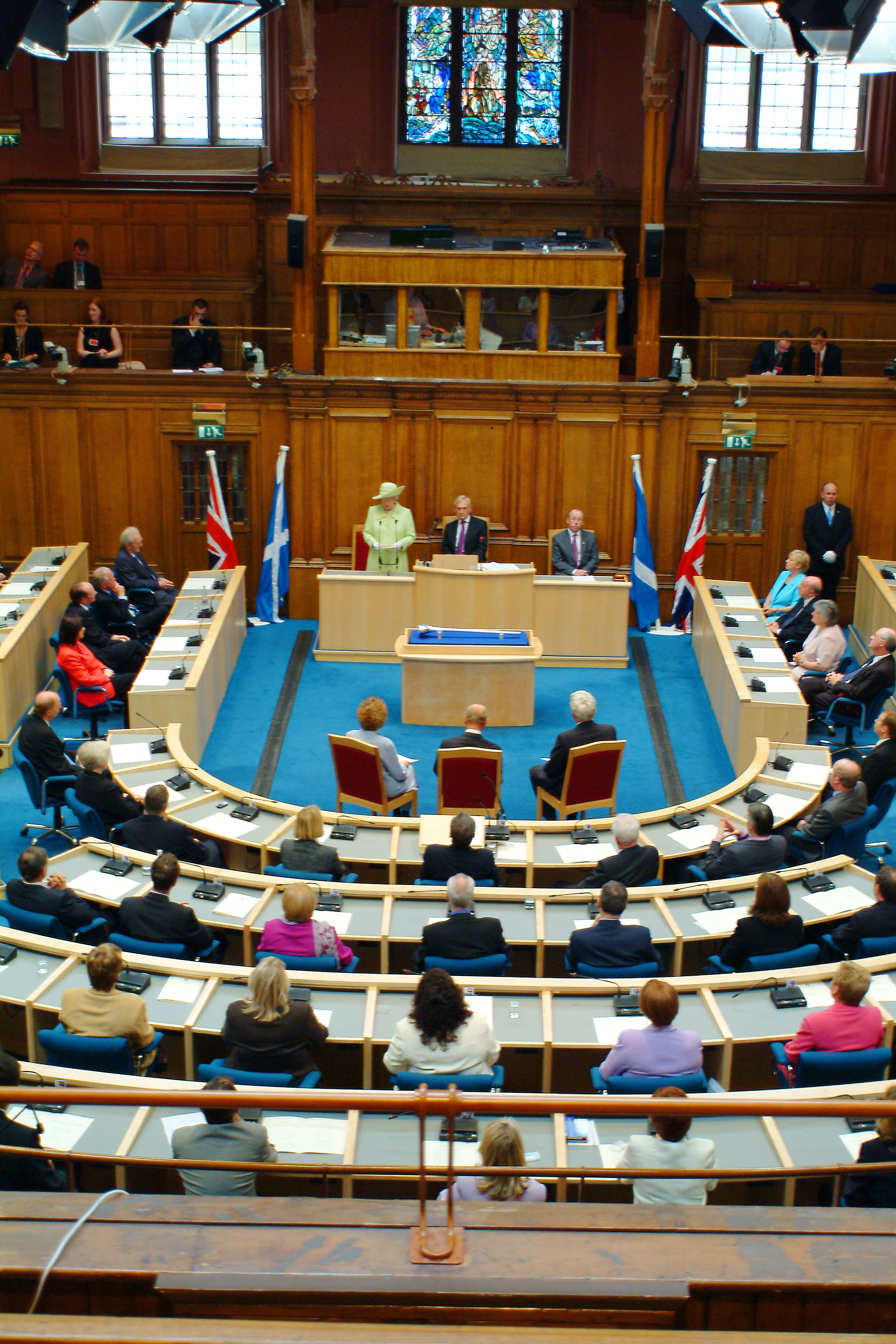
- Inside the General Assembly as the Scottish Parliament debating chamber

Overview
- Legislative body: Scottish Parliament
- Jurisdiction: Scotland
- Meeting place: General Assembly
- Term: 12 May 1999 – 31 March 2003
- Election: 1999
- Government: Dewar government McLeish government First McConnell government
- Members: 129
- Presiding Officer: Sir David Steel
- First Minister: Donald Dewar (1999–2000); Henry McLeish (2000–01); Jack McConnell (2001–03)
- Deputy First Minister: Jim Wallace
- Leader of the largest opposition party: Alex Salmond (1999–2000); John Swinney (2000–03)

This is a list of members (MSPs) returned to the first Scottish Parliament at the 1999 Scottish Parliament election. Of the 129 members, 73 were elected from first past the post constituencies with a further 56 members being returned from eight regions, each electing seven MSPs as a form of mixed member proportional representation .

The 1999 election produced a hung parliament, with the Labour MSPs forming the largest minority. Consequently, they formed a coalition with the Liberal Democrats to form the first Scottish Executive.

== Composition ==
| Party | | May 1999 election | March 2003 dissolution |
|---|---|---|---|
| • | Scottish Labour | 56 (Note: Includes 9 MSPs sponsored by the Co-operative Party, who are designated Labour and Co-operative.) | 55 (Note: Includes 10 MSPs sponsored by the Co-operative Party, who are designated Labour and Co-operative.) |
| | Scottish National Party | 35 | 33 |
| | Scottish Conservatives | 18 | 19 |
| • | Scottish Liberal Democrats | 17 | 16 |
| | Scottish Greens | 1 | 1 |
| | Scottish Socialist Party | 1 | 1 |
| | Independents | 1 | 3 |
| | Presiding Officer | 0 | 1 |
| Total | | 129 | |
| Government majority | | 17 | 14 |

Government coalition parties denoted with bullets (•)

== Graphical representation ==
These are graphical representations of the Scottish Parliament showing a comparison of party strengths as it was directly after the 1999 election and its composition at the time of its dissolution in March 2003:

- Note this is not the official seating plan of the Scottish Parliament.

== List of MSPs ==
This is a list of MSPs at dissolution. For a list of MSPs elected in the 1999 Scottish Parliament election, see here. The changes table below records all changes in party affiliation during the session.

| Name | Image | Member for | Type | Party |
|---|---|---|---|---|
| Brian Adam | | North East Scotland | Regional | Scottish National Party |
| Bill Aitken | | Glasgow | Regional | Conservative |
| Wendy Alexander | | Paisley North | Constituency | Labour |
| Jackie Baillie | | Dumbarton | Constituency | Labour |
| Scott Barrie | | Dunfermline West | Constituency | Labour |
| Sarah Boyack | | Edinburgh Central | Constituency | Labour Co-op |
| Rhona Brankin | | Midlothian | Constituency | Labour Co-op |
| Robert Brown | | Glasgow | Regional | Liberal Democrats |
| Bill Butler | | Glasgow Anniesland | Constituency | Labour Co-op |
| Colin Campbell | | West of Scotland | Regional | Scottish National Party |
| Dennis Canavan | | Falkirk West | Constituency | Independent |
| Malcolm Chisholm | | Edinburgh North and Leith | Constituency | Labour |
| Cathie Craigie | | Cumbernauld and Kilsyth | Constituency | Labour |
| Bruce Crawford | | Mid Scotland and Fife | Regional | Scottish National Party |
| Roseanna Cunningham | | Perth | Constituency | Scottish National Party |
| Margaret Curran | | Glasgow Baillieston | Constituency | Labour |
| David Davidson | | North East Scotland | Regional | Conservative |
| Susan Deacon | | Edinburgh East and Musselburgh | Constituency | Labour |
| James Douglas-Hamilton | | Lothians | Regional | Conservative |
| Helen Eadie | | Dunfermline East | Constituency | Labour Co-op |
| Dorothy Grace Elder | | Glasgow | Regional | Independent |
| Fergus Ewing | | Inverness East, Nairn and Lochaber | Constituency | Scottish National Party |
| Margaret Ewing | | Moray | Constituency | Scottish National Party |
| Winnie Ewing | | Highlands and Islands | Regional | Scottish National Party |
| Linda Fabiani | | Central Scotland | Regional | Scottish National Party |
| Patricia Ferguson | | Glasgow Maryhill and Springburn | Constituency | Labour |
| Alex Fergusson | | South of Scotland | Regional | Conservative |
| Ross Finnie | | West of Scotland | Regional | Liberal Democrats |
| Brian Fitzpatrick | | Strathkelvin and Bearsden | Constituency | Labour |
| Murdo Fraser | | Mid Scotland and Fife | Regional | Conservative |
| Phil Gallie | | South of Scotland | Regional | Conservative |
| Kenneth Gibson | | Glasgow | Regional | Scottish National Party |
| Karen Gillon | | Clydesdale | Constituency | Labour |
| Trish Godman | | West Renfrewshire | Constituency | Labour |
| Annabel Goldie | | West of Scotland | Regional | Conservative |
| Donald Gorrie | | Central Scotland | Regional | Liberal Democrats |
| Christine Grahame | | South of Scotland | Regional | Scottish National Party |
| Rhoda Grant | | Highlands and Islands | Regional | Labour Co-op |
| Iain Gray | | Edinburgh Pentlands | Constituency | Labour |
| Duncan Hamilton | | Highlands and Islands | Regional | Scottish National Party |
| Keith Harding | | Mid Scotland and Fife | Regional | Conservative |
| Robin Harper | | Lothians | Regional | Green |
| Hugh Henry | | Paisley South | Constituency | Labour |
| John Home Robertson | | East Lothian | Constituency | Labour |
| Janis Hughes | | Glasgow Rutherglen | Constituency | Labour |
| Fiona Hyslop | | Lothians | Regional | Scottish National Party |
| Adam Ingram | | South of Scotland | Regional | Scottish National Party |
| Gordon Jackson | | Glasgow Govan | Constituency | Labour |
| Sylvia Jackson | | Stirling | Constituency | Labour |
| Cathy Jamieson | | Carrick, Cumnock and Doon Valley | Constituency | Labour Co-op |
| Margaret Jamieson | | Kilmarnock and Loudoun | Constituency | Labour |
| Ian Jenkins | | Tweeddale, Ettrick & Lauderdale | Constituency | Liberal Democrats |
| Alex Johnstone | | North East Scotland | Regional | Conservative |
| Andy Kerr | | East Kilbride | Constituency | Labour |
| Johann Lamont | | Glasgow Pollok | Constituency | Labour Co-op |
| Marilyn Livingstone | | Kirkcaldy | Constituency | Labour Co-op |
| Richard Lochhead | | North East Scotland | Regional | Scottish National Party |
| George Lyon | | Argyll and Bute | Constituency | Liberal Democrats |
| Kenny MacAskill | | Lothians | Regional | Scottish National Party |
| Lewis Macdonald | | Aberdeen Central | Constituency | Labour |
| Margo MacDonald | | Lothians | Regional | Independent |
| Ken Macintosh | | Eastwood | Constituency | Labour Co-op |
| Angus MacKay | | Edinburgh South | Constituency | Labour |
| Kate Maclean | | Dundee West | Constituency | Labour |
| Maureen Macmillan | | Highlands and Islands | Regional | Labour |
| Paul Martin | | Glasgow Springburn | Constituency | Labour |
| Tricia Marwick | | Mid Scotland and Fife | Regional | Scottish National Party |
| Michael Matheson | | Central Scotland | Regional | Scottish National Party |
| John McAllion | | Dundee East | Constituency | Labour |
| Frank McAveety | | Glasgow Shettleston | Constituency | Labour |
| Tom McCabe | | Hamilton South | Constituency | Labour |
| Jack McConnell | | Motherwell and Wishaw | Constituency | Labour |
| Jamie McGrigor | | Highlands and Islands | Regional | Conservative |
| Irene McGugan | | North East Scotland | Regional | Scottish National Party |
| Lyndsay McIntosh | | Central Scotland | Regional | Conservative |
| Henry McLeish | | Central Fife | Constituency | Labour |
| Fiona McLeod | | West of Scotland | Regional | Scottish National Party |
| David McLetchie | | Lothians | Regional | Conservative |
| Michael McMahon | | Hamilton North and Bellshill | Constituency | Labour |
| Duncan McNeil | | Greenock and Inverclyde | Constituency | Labour |
| Pauline McNeill | | Glasgow Kelvin | Constituency | Labour Co-op |
| Des McNulty | | Clydebank and Milngavie | Constituency | Labour |
| Brian Monteith | | Mid Scotland and Fife | Regional | Conservative |
| Alasdair Morgan | | Galloway and Upper Nithsdale | Constituency | Scottish National Party |
| Alasdair Morrison | | Western Isles | Constituency | Labour |
| Bristow Muldoon | | Livingston | Constituency | Labour |
| Mary Mulligan | | Linlithgow | Constituency | Labour |
| David Mundell | | South of Scotland | Regional | Conservative |
| John Farquhar Munro | | Ross, Skye and Inverness West | Constituency | Liberal Democrats |
| Elaine Murray | | Dumfries | Constituency | Labour |
| Alex Neil | | Central Scotland | Regional | Scottish National Party |
| Irene Oldfather | | Cunninghame South | Constituency | Labour |
| Gil Paterson | | Central Scotland | Regional | Scottish National Party |
| Peter Peacock | | Highlands and Islands | Regional | Labour |
| Cathy Peattie | | Falkirk East | Constituency | Labour |
| Lloyd Quinan | | West of Scotland | Regional | Scottish National Party |
| Nora Radcliffe | | Gordon | Constituency | Liberal Democrats |
| Keith Raffan | | Mid Scotland and Fife | Regional | Liberal Democrats |
| George Reid | | Mid Scotland and Fife | Regional | Scottish National Party |
| Shona Robison | | North East Scotland | Regional | Scottish National Party |
| Euan Robson | | Roxburgh and Berwickshire | Constituency | Liberal Democrats |
| Mike Rumbles | | West Aberdeenshire and Kincardine | Constituency | Liberal Democrats |
| Michael Russell | | South of Scotland | Regional | Scottish National Party |
| Mary Scanlon | | Highlands and Islands | Regional | Conservative |
| John Scott | | Ayr | Constituency | Conservative |
| Tavish Scott | | Shetland | Constituency | Liberal Democrats |
| Tommy Sheridan | | Glasgow | Regional | Socialist |
| Richard Simpson | | Ochil | Constituency | Labour |
| Elaine Smith | | Coatbridge and Chryston | Constituency | Labour |
| Iain Smith | | North East Fife | Constituency | Liberal Democrats |
| Margaret Smith | | Edinburgh West | Constituency | Liberal Democrats |
| David Steel | | Lothians | Regional | Presiding Officer |
| Nicol Stephen | | Aberdeen South | Constituency | Liberal Democrats |
| Stewart Stevenson | | Banff and Buchan | Constituency | Scottish National Party |
| Jamie Stone | | Caithness, Sutherland and Easter Ross | Constituency | Liberal Democrats |
| Nicola Sturgeon | | Glasgow | Regional | Scottish National Party |
| John Swinney | | North Tayside | Constituency | Scottish National Party |
| Elaine Thomson | | Aberdeen North | Constituency | Labour |
| Murray Tosh | | South of Scotland | Regional | Conservative |
| Kay Ullrich | | West of Scotland | Regional | Scottish National Party |
| Ben Wallace | | North East Scotland | Regional | Conservative |
| Jim Wallace | | Orkney | Constituency | Liberal Democrats |
| Mike Watson | | Glasgow Cathcart | Constituency | Labour |
| Andrew Welsh | | Angus | Constituency | Scottish National Party |
| Sandra White | | Glasgow | Regional | Scottish National Party |
| Karen Whitefield | | Airdrie and Shotts | Constituency | Labour |
| Allan Wilson | | Cunninghame North | Constituency | Labour |
| Andrew Wilson | | Central Scotland | Regional | Scottish National Party |
| John Young | | West of Scotland | Regional | Conservative |

=== Former MSPs ===
| Name | Image | Member for | Type | Party | Notes |
|---|---|---|---|---|---|
| Donald Dewar | | Glasgow Anniesland | Constituency | Scottish Labour Party | Deceased |
| Sam Galbraith | | Strathkelvin and Bearsden | Constituency | Scottish Labour Party | Resigned |
| Nick Johnston | | Mid Scotland and Fife | Regional | Scottish Conservative and Unionist Party | Resigned |
| Ian Welsh | | Ayr | Constituency | Scottish Labour Party | Resigned |
| Alex Salmond | | Banff and Buchan | Constituency | Scottish National Party | Resigned |

== Changes ==
During the 1999 to 2003 period there were one death and three resignations amongst constituency MSPs, and replacement MSPs were elected in by-elections. Also there was one resignation amongst the additional member MSPs, with that MSP being replaced by the candidate who was next on the additional members list at the time of the 1999 election.

| Date | Constituency/region | Gain | Loss | Note |
|---|---|---|---|---|
| 31 May 1999 | Lothians | Presiding Officer | Liberal Democrats | David Steel was elected as the Presiding Officer and had to take voluntary suspension from his party. |
| 21 December 1999 | Ayr | | Labour | Ian Welsh resigned from Parliament, citing family reasons. |
| 16 March 2000 | Ayr | Conservative | | John Scott won the Ayr by-election. |
| 11 October 2000 | Glasgow Anniesland | | Labour | Donald Dewar died. |
| 23 November 2000 | Glasgow Anniesland | Labour Co-op | | Bill Butler won the Glasgow Anniesland by-election. |
| 14 May 2001 | Strathkelvin and Bearsden | | Labour | Sam Galbraith resigned due to ill health. |
| 14 May 2001 | Banff and Buchan | | SNP | Alex Salmond resigned from the Scottish Parliament to contest a House of Commons seat. |
| 7 June 2001 | Banff and Buchan | SNP | | Stewart Stevenson won the Banff and Buchan by-election. |
| 7 June 2001 | Strathkelvin and Bearsden | Labour | | Brian Fitzpatrick won the Strathkelvin and Bearsden by-election. |
| 10 August 2001 | Mid Scotland and Fife | Conservative | Conservative | Nick Johnston resigned and was replaced by Murdo Fraser. |
| 1 May 2002 | Glasgow | Independent | SNP | Dorothy-Grace Elder resigned from the SNP. |
| 28 January 2003 | Lothians | Independent | SNP | Margo MacDonald was expelled from the SNP. |

== See also ==
- Member of the Scottish Parliament
- 1999 Scottish Parliament election
- Executive of the 1st Scottish Parliament
- Scottish Parliament
