= 2nd Scottish Parliament =

Legislature elected in 2003

←	1st Scottish Parliament	3rd Scottish Parliament	→
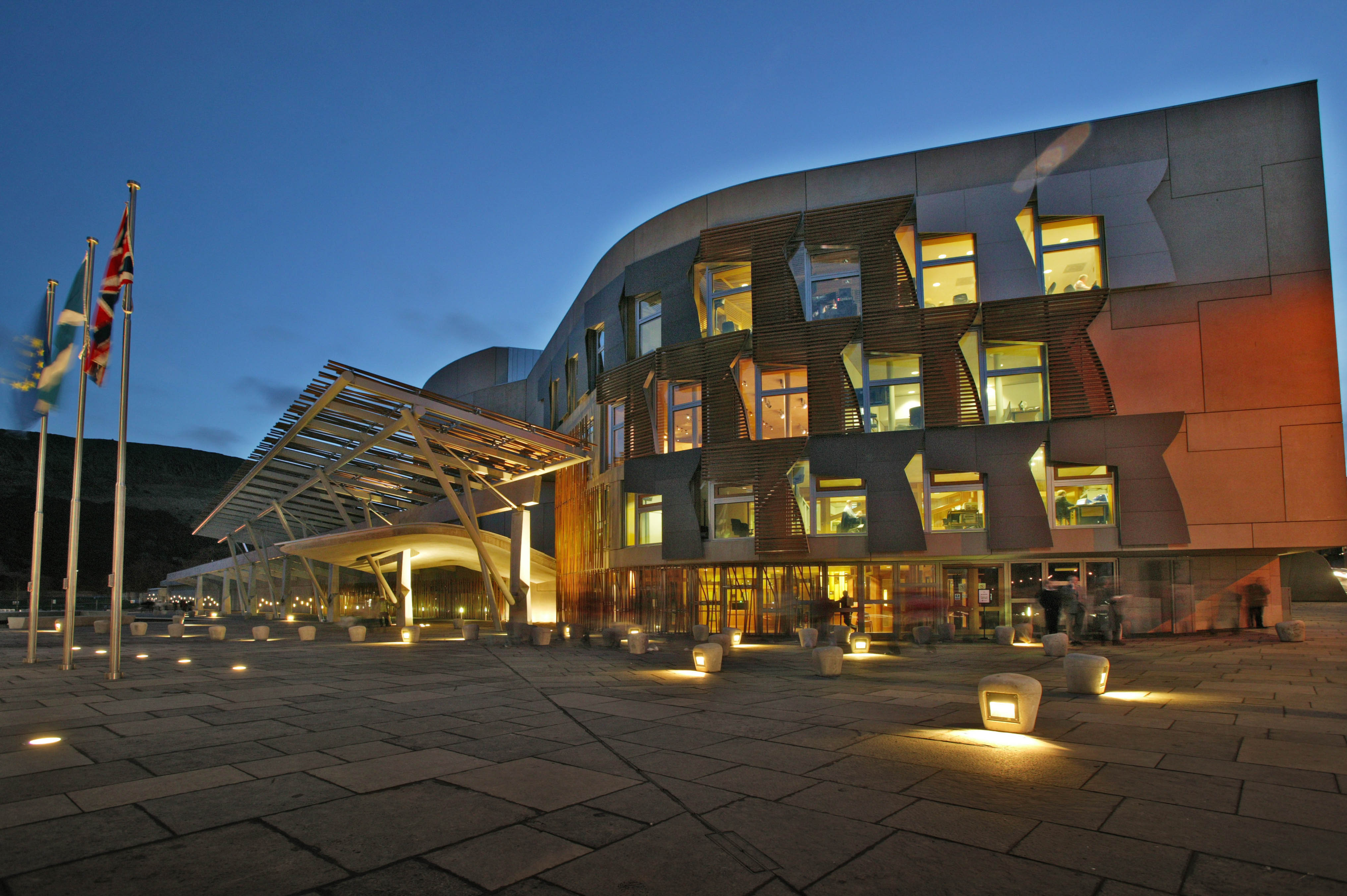
- The Scottish Parliament Building, pictured in 2005, opened during this term

Overview
- Legislative body: Scottish Parliament
- Jurisdiction: Scotland
- Meeting place: General Assembly; Scottish Parliament Building
- Term: 7 May 2003 – 2 April 2007
- Election: 2003
- Government: Second McConnell government
- Members: 129
- Presiding Officer: George Reid
- First Minister: Jack McConnell
- Deputy First Minister: Jim Wallace (2003–05); Nicol Stephen (2005–07)
- Leader of the largest opposition party: John Swinney (2003–04); Nicola Sturgeon (2004–07)

This is a list of members (MSPs) returned to the second Scottish Parliament at the 2003 Scottish Parliament election. Of the 129 members, 73 were elected from first past the post constituencies with a further 56 members being returned from eight regions, each electing seven MSPs as a form of mixed member proportional representation.

The 2nd Scottish Parliament became colloquially known as the Rainbow Parliament. This was due to the 2003 election producing a result whereby the incoming members represented the largest number of political parties, with wide-ranging views from across the political spectrum, to be elected at a national level in Scotland. The governing Labour – Liberal Democrat coalition continued in government for a second term.

== Composition ==
Party		May 2003 election	April 2007 dissolution
•	Scottish Labour Party	50 (Note: Includes 10 MSPs sponsored by the Co-operative Party, who are designated Labour and Co-operative.)	50 (Note: Includes 10 MSPs sponsored by the Co-operative Party, who are designated Labour and Co-operative.)
	Scottish National Party	27	25
	Scottish Conservative Party	18	17
•	Scottish Liberal Democrats	17	17
	Scottish Green Party	7	7
	Scottish Socialist Party	6	4
	Solidarity	0	2
	Scottish Senior Citizens Unity Party	1	1
	Independents	3	5
	Presiding Officer	0	1
Total		129	
Government majority		5	6

Government coalition parties denoted with bullets (•)

== Graphical representation ==
These are graphical representations of the Scottish Parliament showing a comparison of party strengths as it was directly after the 2003 election and its composition at the time of its dissolution in April 2007:

- Note this is not the official seating plan of the Scottish Parliament.

== List of MSPs ==
This is a list of MSPs at dissolution. For a list of MSPs elected in the 2003 election see here. The changes table below records all changes in party affiliation during the session.

Name	Image	Member for	Type	Party
Brian Adam		Aberdeen North	Constituency	Scottish National Party
Bill Aitken		Glasgow	Regional	Conservative
Wendy Alexander		Paisley North	Constituency	Labour
Andrew Arbuckle		Mid Scotland and Fife	Regional	Liberal Democrats
Jackie Baillie		Dumbarton	Constituency	Labour
Shiona Baird		North East Scotland	Regional	Green
Richard Baker		North East Scotland	Regional	Labour
Mark Ballard		Lothians	Regional	Green
Chris Ballance		South of Scotland	Regional	Green
Scott Barrie		Dunfermline West	Constituency	Labour
Sarah Boyack		Edinburgh Central	Constituency	Labour Co-op
Rhona Brankin		Midlothian	Constituency	Labour Co-op
Ted Brocklebank		Mid Scotland and Fife	Regional	Conservative
Robert Brown		Glasgow	Regional	Liberal Democrats
Derek Brownlee		South of Scotland	Regional	Conservative
Bill Butler		Glasgow Anniesland	Constituency	Labour Co-op
Rosemary Byrne		South of Scotland	Regional	Solidarity
Dennis Canavan		Falkirk West	Constituency	Independent
Malcolm Chisholm		Edinburgh North and Leith	Constituency	Labour
Cathie Craigie		Cumbernauld and Kilsyth	Constituency	Labour
Bruce Crawford		Mid Scotland and Fife	Regional	Scottish National Party
Roseanna Cunningham		Perth	Constituency	Scottish National Party
Frances Curran		West of Scotland	Regional	Socialist
Margaret Curran		Glasgow Baillieston	Constituency	Labour
David Davidson		North East Scotland	Regional	Conservative
Susan Deacon		Edinburgh East and Musselburgh	Constituency	Labour
James Douglas-Hamilton		Lothians	Regional	Conservative
Helen Eadie		Dunfermline East	Constituency	Labour Co-op
Fergus Ewing		Inverness East, Nairn and Lochaber	Constituency	Scottish National Party
Linda Fabiani		Central Scotland	Regional	Scottish National Party
Patricia Ferguson		Glasgow Maryhill and Springburn	Constituency	Labour
Alex Fergusson		Galloway and Upper Nithsdale	Constituency	Conservative
Ross Finnie		West of Scotland	Regional	Liberal Democrats
Colin Fox		Lothians	Regional	Socialist
Murdo Fraser		Mid Scotland and Fife	Regional	Conservative
Phil Gallie		South of Scotland	Regional	Conservative
Rob Gibson		Highlands and Islands	Regional	Scottish National Party
Karen Gillon		Clydesdale	Constituency	Labour
Marlyn Glen		North East Scotland	Regional	Labour
Trish Godman		West Renfrewshire	Constituency	Labour
Annabel Goldie		West of Scotland	Regional	Conservative
Charlie Gordon		Glasgow Cathcart	Constituency	Labour
Donald Gorrie		Central Scotland	Regional	Liberal Democrats
Christine Grahame		South of Scotland	Regional	Scottish National Party
Robin Harper		Lothians	Regional	Green
Patrick Harvie		Glasgow	Regional	Green
Hugh Henry		Paisley South	Constituency	Labour
John Home Robertson		East Lothian	Constituency	Labour
Janis Hughes		Glasgow Rutherglen	Constituency	Labour
Fiona Hyslop		Lothians	Regional	Scottish National Party
Adam Ingram		South of Scotland	Regional	Scottish National Party
Gordon Jackson		Glasgow Govan	Constituency	Labour
Sylvia Jackson		Stirling	Constituency	Labour
Cathy Jamieson		Carrick, Cumnock and Doon Valley	Constituency	Labour Co-op
Margaret Jamieson		Kilmarnock and Loudoun	Constituency	Labour
Alex Johnstone		North East Scotland	Regional	Conservative
Rosie Kane		Glasgow	Regional	Socialist
Andy Kerr		East Kilbride	Constituency	Labour
Johann Lamont		Glasgow Pollok	Constituency	Labour Co-op
Carolyn Leckie		Central Scotland	Regional	Socialist
Marilyn Livingstone		Kirkcaldy	Constituency	Labour Co-op
Richard Lochhead		Moray	Constituency	Scottish National Party
George Lyon		Argyll and Bute	Constituency	Liberal Democrats
Kenny MacAskill		Lothians	Regional	Scottish National Party
Lewis Macdonald		Aberdeen Central	Constituency	Labour
Margo MacDonald		Lothians	Regional	Independent
Ken Macintosh		Eastwood	Constituency	Labour Co-op
Kate Maclean		Dundee West	Constituency	Labour
Maureen Macmillan		Highlands and Islands	Regional	Labour
Campbell Martin		West of Scotland	Regional	Independent
Paul Martin		Glasgow Springburn	Constituency	Labour
Tricia Marwick		Mid Scotland and Fife	Regional	Scottish National Party
Jim Mather		Highlands and Islands	Regional	Scottish National Party
Michael Matheson		Central Scotland	Regional	Scottish National Party
Stewart Maxwell		West of Scotland	Regional	Scottish National Party
Christine May		Fife Central	Constituency	Labour Co-op
Frank McAveety		Glasgow Shettleston	Constituency	Labour
Tom McCabe		Hamilton South	Constituency	Labour
Jack McConnell		Motherwell and Wishaw	Constituency	Labour
Bruce McFee		West of Scotland	Regional	Scottish National Party
Jamie McGrigor		Highlands and Islands	Regional	Conservative
David McLetchie		Edinburgh Pentlands	Constituency	Conservative
Michael McMahon		Hamilton North and Bellshill	Constituency	Labour
Duncan McNeil		Greenock and Inverclyde	Constituency	Labour
Pauline McNeill		Glasgow Kelvin	Constituency	Labour Co-op
Des McNulty		Clydebank and Milngavie	Constituency	Labour
Nanette Milne		North East Scotland	Regional	Conservative
Margaret Mitchell		Central Scotland	Regional	Conservative
Brian Monteith		Mid Scotland and Fife	Regional	Independent
Alasdair Morgan		South of Scotland	Regional	Scottish National Party
Alasdair Morrison		Western Isles	Constituency	Labour
Bristow Muldoon		Livingston	Constituency	Labour
Mary Mulligan		Linlithgow	Constituency	Labour
John Farquhar Munro		Ross, Skye and Inverness West	Constituency	Liberal Democrats
Elaine Murray		Dumfries	Constituency	Labour
Alex Neil		Central Scotland	Regional	Scottish National Party
Irene Oldfather		Cunninghame South	Constituency	Labour
Peter Peacock		Highlands and Islands	Regional	Labour
Cathy Peattie		Falkirk East	Constituency	Labour
Dave Petrie		Highlands and Islands	Regional	Conservative
Mike Pringle		Edinburgh South	Constituency	Liberal Democrats
Jeremy Purvis		Tweeddale, Ettrick & Lauderdale	Constituency	Liberal Democrats
Nora Radcliffe		Gordon	Constituency	Liberal Democrats
George Reid		Ochil	Constituency	Presiding Officer
Shona Robison		Dundee East	Constituency	Scottish National Party
Euan Robson		Roxburgh and Berwickshire	Constituency	Liberal Democrats
Mike Rumbles		West Aberdeenshire and Kincardine	Constituency	Liberal Democrats
Mark Ruskell		Mid Scotland and Fife	Regional	Green
Eleanor Scott		Highlands and Islands	Regional	Green
John Scott		Ayr	Constituency	Conservative
Tavish Scott		Shetland	Constituency	Liberal Democrats
Tommy Sheridan		Glasgow	Regional	Solidarity
Elaine Smith		Coatbridge and Chryston	Constituency	Labour
Iain Smith		North East Fife	Constituency	Liberal Democrats
Margaret Smith		Edinburgh West	Constituency	Liberal Democrats
Nicol Stephen		Aberdeen South	Constituency	Liberal Democrats
Stewart Stevenson		Banff and Buchan	Constituency	Scottish National Party
Jamie Stone		Caithness, Sutherland and Easter Ross	Constituency	Liberal Democrats
Nicola Sturgeon		Glasgow	Regional	Scottish National Party
John Swinburne		Central Scotland	Regional	Senior Citizens Unity Party
John Swinney		North Tayside	Constituency	Scottish National Party
Murray Tosh		West of Scotland	Regional	Conservative
Jean Turner		Strathkelvin and Bearsden	Constituency	Independent
Jim Wallace		Orkney	Constituency	Liberal Democrats
Maureen Watt		North East Scotland	Regional	Scottish National Party
Andrew Welsh		Angus	Constituency	Scottish National Party
Sandra White		Glasgow	Regional	Scottish National Party
Karen Whitefield		Airdrie and Shotts	Constituency	Labour
Allan Wilson		Cunninghame North	Constituency	Labour

=== Former MSPs ===
Name	Image	Member for	Type	Party	Notes
Mike Watson		Glasgow Cathcart	Constituency	Scottish Labour Party	resigned
Keith Raffan		Mid Scotland and Fife	Regional	Scottish Liberal Democrats	resigned
David Mundell		South of Scotland	Regional	Scottish Conservative and Unionist Party	resigned
Margaret Ewing		Moray	Constituency	Scottish National Party	deceased
Mary Scanlon		Highlands and Islands	Regional	Scottish Conservative and Unionist Party	resigned

== Changes ==
Date	Constituency/region	Gain	Loss	Note
7 May 2003	Ochil	Presiding Officer	SNP	George Reid is elected as the Presiding Officer and had to take voluntary suspension from the SNP.
10 July 2004	West of Scotland	Independent	SNP	Campbell Martin was expelled from the SNP.
10 January 2005	Mid Scotland and Fife	Liberal Democrats	Liberal Democrats	Keith Raffan resigned from Parliament, citing reasons of ill health. He was replaced by Andrew Arbuckle.
17 June 2005	South of Scotland	Conservative	Conservative	David Mundell resigned from the Scottish Parliament as he had won election to the UK Parliament. Derek Brownlee replaced Mundell.
1 September 2005	Glasgow Cathcart		Labour	Mike Watson resigned from the Scottish Parliament after pleading guilty to a charge of fire-raising.
29 September 2005	Glasgow Cathcart	Labour		Charlie Gordon wins the Glasgow Cathcart by-election.
08 November 2005	Mid Scotland and Fife	Independent	Conservative	Brian Monteith is expelled from his party after briefing against his party leader David McLetchie.
21 March 2006	Moray		SNP	Margaret Ewing dies in March 2006.
7 April 2006	North East Scotland	SNP	SNP	Richard Lochhead resigned his regional seat to contest the Moray by-election. Maureen Watt replaced Lochhead.
7 April 2006	Highlands and Islands	Conservative	Conservative	Mary Scanlon resigned her regional seat to contest the Moray by-election. Dave Petrie replaced Scanlon.
27 April 2006	Moray	SNP		Richard Lochhead wins the Moray by-election.
3 September 2006	Glasgow	Solidarity	Scottish Socialist	Tommy Sheridan resigned from the SSP and formed Solidarity.
3 September 2006	South of Scotland	Solidarity	Scottish Socialist	Rosemary Byrne resigned from the SSP and joined Solidarity.

== See also ==
- 2003 Scottish Parliament election
- Executive of the 2nd Scottish Parliament
- Scottish Parliament
- Member of the Scottish Parliament
