= 3rd Scottish Parliament =

Legislature elected in 2007

←	2nd Scottish Parliament	4th Scottish Parliament	→
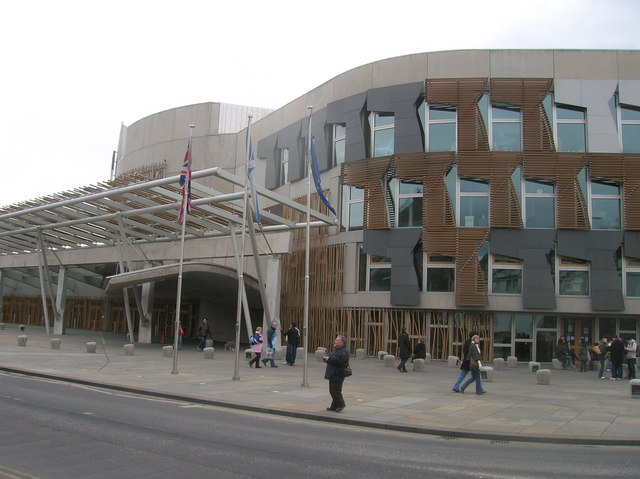
- Scottish Parliament Building, 2008

Overview
- Legislative body: Scottish Parliament
- Jurisdiction: Scotland
- Meeting place: Scottish Parliament Building
- Term: 14 May 2007 – 22 March 2011
- Election: 2007
- Government: First Salmond government
- Members: 129
- Presiding Officer: Alex Fergusson
- First Minister: Alex Salmond
- Deputy First Minister: Nicola Sturgeon
- Leader of the largest opposition party: Jack McConnell (2007); Cathy Jamieson (2007); Wendy Alexander (2007–08); Cathy Jamieson (2008); Iain Gray (2008–11)

This is a list of members (MSPs) returned to the third Scottish Parliament at the 2007 Scottish Parliament election. Of the 129 MSPs, 73 were elected from first past the post constituencies with a further 56 members being returned from eight regions, each electing seven MSPs as a form of mixed member proportional representation.

The 2007 election saw the Scottish National Party replace Scottish Labour as the largest party group in the Parliament. On 16 May 2007, the Scottish Parliament elected Alex Salmond as First Minister of Scotland. The next day, Salmond officially took office after being sworn in at the Court of Session and went on to form the Parliament's first minority government.

== Composition ==
Party		May 2007 election	March 2011 dissolution
•	Scottish National Party	47	47
	Scottish Labour	46 (Note: Includes 14 MSPs sponsored by the Co-operative Party, who are designated Labour and Co-operative.)	46 (Note: Includes 14 MSPs sponsored by the Co-operative Party, who are designated Labour and Co-operative.)
	Scottish Conservatives	17	16
	Scottish Liberal Democrats	16	16
	Scottish Greens	2	2
	Independents	1	1
	Presiding Officer	0	1
Total		129	
Government majority		−35	−34

Government parties denoted with bullets (•)

== Graphical representation ==
These are graphical representations of the Scottish Parliament showing a comparison of party strengths as it was directly after the 2007 Scottish Parliament election and its composition at the time of its dissolution in March 2011:

- Note this is not the official seating plan of the Scottish Parliament.

== List of MSPs ==
This is a list of MSPs at dissolution. The changes table below records all changes in party affiliation during the session. See here a list of MSPs elected in the 2007 election.

Name	Image	Member for	Type	Party
Brian Adam		Aberdeen North	Constituency	Scottish National Party
Bill Aitken		Glasgow	Regional	Conservative
Wendy Alexander		Paisley North	Constituency	Labour
Alasdair Allan		Western Isles	Constituency	Scottish National Party
Jackie Baillie		Dumbarton	Constituency	Labour
Claire Baker		Mid Scotland and Fife	Regional	Labour Co-op
Richard Baker		North East Scotland	Regional	Labour
Sarah Boyack		Edinburgh Central	Constituency	Labour Co-op
Rhona Brankin		Midlothian	Constituency	Labour Co-op
Ted Brocklebank		Mid Scotland and Fife	Regional	Conservative
Gavin Brown		Lothians	Regional	Conservative
Keith Brown		Ochil	Constituency	Scottish National Party
Robert Brown		Glasgow	Regional	Liberal Democrats
Derek Brownlee		South of Scotland	Regional	Conservative
Bill Butler		Glasgow Anniesland	Constituency	Labour Co-op
Aileen Campbell		South of Scotland	Regional	Scottish National Party
Jackson Carlaw		West of Scotland	Regional	Conservative
Malcolm Chisholm		Edinburgh North and Leith	Constituency	Labour
Willie Coffey		Kilmarnock and Loudoun	Constituency	Scottish National Party
Angela Constance		Livingston	Constituency	Scottish National Party
Cathie Craigie		Cumbernauld and Kilsyth	Constituency	Labour
Bruce Crawford		Stirling	Constituency	Scottish National Party
Roseanna Cunningham		Perth	Constituency	Scottish National Party
Margaret Curran		Glasgow Baillieston	Constituency	Labour
Nigel Don		North East Scotland	Regional	Scottish National Party
Bob Doris		Glasgow	Regional	Scottish National Party
Helen Eadie		Dunfermline East	Constituency	Labour Co-op
Fergus Ewing		Inverness East, Nairn and Lochaber	Constituency	Scottish National Party
Linda Fabiani		Central Scotland	Regional	Scottish National Party
Patricia Ferguson		Glasgow Maryhill and Springburn	Constituency	Labour
Alex Fergusson		Galloway and Upper Nithsdale	Constituency	Presiding Officer
Ross Finnie		West of Scotland	Regional	Liberal Democrats
Joe FitzPatrick		Dundee West	Constituency	Scottish National Party
George Foulkes		Lothians	Regional	Labour Co-op
Murdo Fraser		Mid Scotland and Fife	Regional	Conservative
Kenneth Gibson		Cunninghame North	Constituency	Scottish National Party
Rob Gibson		Highlands and Islands	Regional	Scottish National Party
Karen Gillon		Clydesdale	Constituency	Labour
Marlyn Glen		North East Scotland	Regional	Labour
Trish Godman		West Renfrewshire	Constituency	Labour
Annabel Goldie		West of Scotland	Regional	Conservative
Charlie Gordon		Glasgow Cathcart	Constituency	Labour
Christine Grahame		South of Scotland	Regional	Scottish National Party
Rhoda Grant		Highlands and Islands	Regional	Labour Co-op
Iain Gray		East Lothian	Constituency	Scottish Labour Party
Robin Harper		Lothians	Regional	Green
Christopher Harvie		Mid Scotland and Fife	Regional	Scottish National Party
Patrick Harvie		Glasgow	Regional	Green
Hugh Henry		Paisley South	Constituency	Labour
Jamie Hepburn		Central Scotland	Regional	Scottish National Party
Jim Hume		South of Scotland	Regional	Liberal Democrats
Fiona Hyslop		Lothians	Regional	Scottish National Party
Adam Ingram		South of Scotland	Regional	Scottish National Party
Cathy Jamieson		Carrick, Cumnock and Doon Valley	Constituency	Labour Co-op
Alex Johnstone		North East Scotland	Regional	Conservative
James Kelly		Glasgow Rutherglen	Constituency	Labour Co-op
Andy Kerr		East Kilbride	Constituency	Labour
Bill Kidd		Glasgow	Regional	Scottish National Party
Johann Lamont		Glasgow Pollok	Constituency	Labour Co-op
John Lamont		Roxburgh and Berwickshire	Constituency	Conservative
Marilyn Livingstone		Kirkcaldy	Constituency	Labour Co-op
Richard Lochhead		Moray	Constituency	Scottish National Party
Kenny MacAskill		Edinburgh East and Musselburgh	Constituency	Scottish National Party
Lewis Macdonald		Aberdeen Central	Constituency	Labour
Margo MacDonald		Lothians	Regional	Independent
Ken Macintosh		Eastwood	Constituency	Labour Co-op
Paul Martin		Glasgow Springburn	Constituency	Labour
Tricia Marwick		Central Fife	Constituency	Scottish National Party
Jim Mather		Argyll and Bute	Constituency	Scottish National Party
Michael Matheson		Falkirk West	Constituency	Scottish National Party
Stewart Maxwell		West of Scotland	Regional	Scottish National Party
Liam McArthur		Orkney	Constituency	Liberal Democrats
Frank McAveety		Glasgow Shettleston	Constituency	Labour
Tom McCabe		Hamilton South	Constituency	Labour
Jack McConnell		Motherwell and Wishaw	Constituency	Labour
Jamie McGrigor		Highlands and Islands	Regional	Conservative
Alison McInnes		North East Scotland	Regional	Liberal Democrats
Ian McKee		Lothians	Regional	Scottish National Party
Christina McKelvie		Central Scotland	Regional	Scottish National Party
Anne McLaughlin		Glasgow (since 12/02/2009)	Regional	Scottish National Party
David McLetchie		Edinburgh Pentlands	Constituency	Conservative
Michael McMahon		Hamilton North and Bellshill	Constituency	Labour
Stuart McMillan		West of Scotland	Regional	Scottish National Party
Duncan McNeil		Greenock and Inverclyde	Constituency	Labour
Pauline McNeill		Glasgow Kelvin	Constituency	Labour Co-op
Des McNulty		Clydebank and Milngavie	Constituency	Labour
Nanette Milne		North East Scotland	Regional	Conservative
Margaret Mitchell		Central Scotland	Regional	Conservative
Alasdair Morgan		South of Scotland	Regional	Scottish National Party
Mary Mulligan		Linlithgow	Constituency	Labour
John Farquhar Munro		Ross, Skye and Inverness West	Constituency	Liberal Democrats
Elaine Murray		Dumfries	Constituency	Labour
Alex Neil		Central Scotland	Regional	Scottish National Party
Hugh O'Donnell		Central Scotland	Regional	Liberal Democrats
Irene Oldfather		Cunninghame South	Constituency	Labour
John Park		Mid Scotland and Fife	Regional	Labour
Gil Paterson		West of Scotland	Regional	Scottish National Party
Peter Peacock		Highlands and Islands	Regional	Labour
Cathy Peattie		Falkirk East	Constituency	Labour
Mike Pringle		Edinburgh South	Constituency	Liberal Democrats
Jeremy Purvis		Tweeddale, Ettrick & Lauderdale	Constituency	Liberal Democrats
Shona Robison		Dundee East	Constituency	Scottish National Party
Mike Rumbles		West Aberdeenshire and Kincardine	Constituency	Liberal Democrats
Michael Russell		South of Scotland	Regional	Scottish National Party
Alex Salmond		Gordon	Constituency	Scottish National Party
Mary Scanlon		Highlands and Islands	Regional	Conservative
John Scott		Ayr	Constituency	Conservative
Tavish Scott		Shetland	Constituency	Liberal Democrats
Richard Simpson		Mid Scotland and Fife	Regional	Labour
Elaine Smith		Coatbridge and Chryston	Constituency	Labour
Liz Smith		Mid Scotland and Fife	Regional	Conservative
Iain Smith		North East Fife	Constituency	Liberal Democrats
Margaret Smith		Edinburgh West	Constituency	Liberal Democrats
Shirley-Anne Somerville		Lothians (since 31/08/2007)	Regional	Scottish National Party
Nicol Stephen		Aberdeen South	Constituency	Liberal Democrats
Stewart Stevenson		Banff and Buchan	Constituency	Scottish National Party
David Stewart		Highlands and Islands	Regional	Labour Co-op
Jamie Stone		Caithness, Sutherland and Easter Ross	Constituency	Liberal Democrats
Nicola Sturgeon		Glasgow Govan	Constituency	Scottish National Party
John Swinney		North Tayside	Constituency	Scottish National Party
Dave Thompson		Highlands and Islands	Regional	Scottish National Party
Jim Tolson		Dunfermline West	Constituency	Liberal Democrats
Maureen Watt		North East Scotland	Regional	Scottish National Party
Andrew Welsh		Angus	Constituency	Scottish National Party
Sandra White		Glasgow	Regional	Scottish National Party
Karen Whitefield		Airdrie and Shotts	Constituency	Labour
David Whitton		Strathkelvin and Bearsden	Constituency	Labour
Bill Wilson		West of Scotland	Regional	Scottish National Party
John Wilson		Central Scotland	Regional	Scottish National Party

=== Former MSPs ===
Name	Image	Member for	Type	Party	Notes
Stefan Tymkewycz		Lothians	Regional	Scottish National Party	resigned 31 August 2007
Bashir Ahmad		Glasgow	Regional	Scottish National Party	died 6 February 2009

== Changes ==
Date	Constituency/region	Gain	Loss	Note
14 May 2007	Galloway and Upper Nithsdale	Presiding Officer	Conservative	Alex Fergusson is elected as the Presiding Officer and had to take voluntary suspension from his party.
31 August 2007	Lothians	SNP	SNP	Stefan Tymkewycz resigned from the Parliament. He was replaced by Shirley-Anne Somerville.
6 February 2009	Glasgow	SNP	SNP	Bashir Ahmad died. He was replaced by Anne McLaughlin.

== See also ==
- Executive of the 3rd Scottish Parliament
- 2007 Scottish Parliament election
- Scottish Parliament
- Member of the Scottish Parliament
