= South of Scotland (Scottish Parliament electoral region) =

Region or constituency of the Scottish Parliament

South of Scotland
Scottish Parliament electoral region
The South of Scotland region
shown within Scotland
Created
1999
Abolished
2011
Constituencies
Ayr
Carrick, Cumnock and Doon Valley
Clydesdale
Cunninghame South
Dumfries
East Lothian
Galloway and Upper Nithsdale
Roxburgh and Berwickshire
Tweeddale, Ettrick and Lauderdale
Council areas
East Ayrshire (part)
East Lothian (part)
Dumfries and Galloway
Midlothian (part)
North Ayrshire (part)
Scottish Borders
South Ayrshire
South Lanarkshire (part)

South of Scotland was one of the eight electoral regions of the Scottish Parliament when it was created in 1999. The region was replaced with South Scotland in 2011 following a review.

Nine of the parliament's 73 first past the post constituencies were sub-divisions of the region and it elected seven of the 56 additional-member Members of the Scottish Parliament (MSPs). Thus it elected a total of 16 MSPs.

The region had boundaries with the West of Scotland, Central Scotland and Lothians regions.

== Constituencies and council areas ==
The constituencies were created in 1999 with the names and boundaries of Westminster constituencies, as existing in at that time. They covered all of three council areas, the Scottish Borders council area, the Dumfries and Galloway council area and the South Ayrshire council area, and parts of five others, the East Ayrshire council area, the East Lothian council area, the Midlothian council area, the North Ayrshire council area and the South Lanarkshire council area:

Constituency
1. Ayr
2. Carrick, Cumnock and Doon Valley
3. Clydesdale
4. Cunninghame South
5. Dumfries
6. East Lothian
7. Galloway and Upper Nithsdale
8. Roxburgh and Berwickshire
9. Tweeddale, Ettrick and Lauderdale
Map
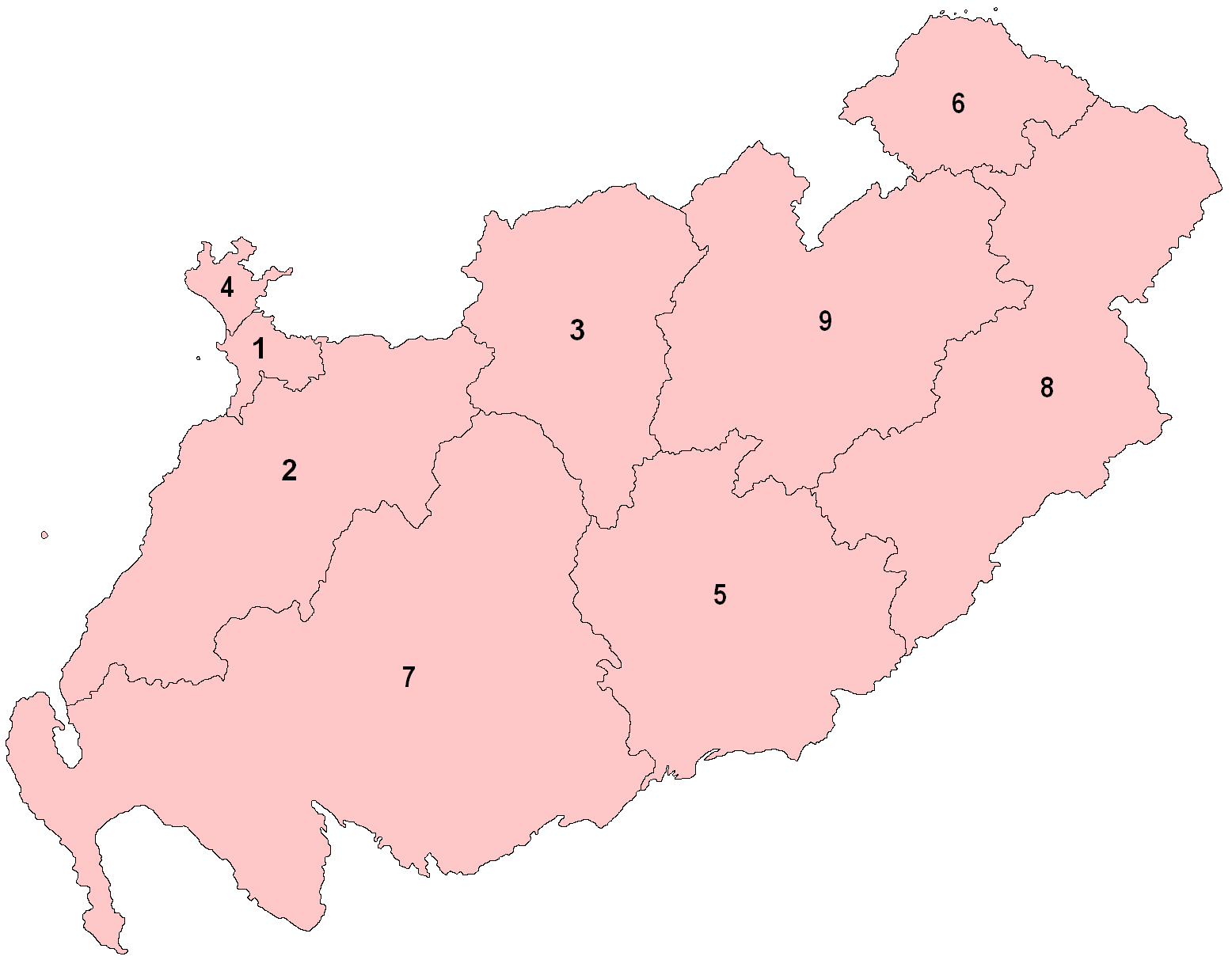

The rest of the East Ayrshire council area was within the Central Scotland electoral region, the rest of the East Lothian and Midlothian council areas were within the Lothians region, the rest of the North Ayrshire council area was within the West of Scotland region and the rest of the South Lanarkshire council area was divided between the Central Scotland and Glasgow regions.

== Members of the Scottish Parliament ==
=== Constituency MSPs ===
| Term | Election | Ayr | Carrick, Cumnock and Doon Valley | Clydesdale | Galloway and Upper Nithsdale | Dumfries | Roxburgh and Berwickshire | Tweeddale, Ettrick and Lauderdale | East Lothian | Cunninghame South |
|---|---|---|---|---|---|---|---|---|---|---|
| 1st | 1999 | Ian Welsh (Labour) | Cathy Jamieson (Labour) | Karen Gillon (Labour) | Alasdair Morgan (SNP) | Elaine Murray (Labour) | Euan Robson (LD) | Ian Jenkins (LD) | John Home Robertson (Labour) | Irene Oldfather (Labour) |
| 1st | 2000 by | John Scott (Conservative) | Cathy Jamieson (Labour) | Karen Gillon (Labour) | Alasdair Morgan (SNP) | Elaine Murray (Labour) | Euan Robson (LD) | Ian Jenkins (LD) | John Home Robertson (Labour) | Irene Oldfather (Labour) |
| 2nd | 2003 | John Scott (Conservative) | Cathy Jamieson (Labour) | Karen Gillon (Labour) | Alex Fergusson (Conservative) | Elaine Murray (Labour) | Euan Robson (LD) | Jeremy Purvis (LD) | John Home Robertson (Labour) | Irene Oldfather (Labour) |
| 3rd | 2007 | John Scott (Conservative) | Cathy Jamieson (Labour) | Karen Gillon (Labour) | Alex Fergusson (Conservative) | Elaine Murray (Labour) | John Lamont (Conservative) | Jeremy Purvis (LD) | Iain Gray (Labour) | Irene Oldfather (Labour) |

=== Regional List MSPs ===
N.B. This table is for presentation purposes only

| Parliament | MSP | MSP | MSP | MSP | MSP | MSP | MSP |
|---|---|---|---|---|---|---|---|
| 1st (1999–2003) | Christine Grahame (SNP) | Adam Ingram (SNP) | Michael Russell (SNP) | Alex Fergusson (Conservative) | Murray Tosh (Conservative) | David Mundell (Conservative) | Phil Gallie (Conservative) |
| 2nd (2003–07) | Christine Grahame (SNP) | Adam Ingram (SNP) | Alasdair Morgan (SNP) | Rosemary Byrne (Socialist) | Chris Ballance (Green) | David Mundell (Conservative) | Phil Gallie (Conservative) |
| 2nd (2003–07) | Christine Grahame (SNP) | Adam Ingram (SNP) | Alasdair Morgan (SNP) | Rosemary Byrne (Socialist) | Chris Ballance (Green) | Derek Brownlee (Conservative) | Phil Gallie (Conservative) |
| 3rd (2007–11) | Christine Grahame (SNP) | Adam Ingram (SNP) | Alasdair Morgan (SNP) | Michael Russell (SNP) | Aileen Campbell (SNP) | Derek Brownlee (Conservative) | Jim Hume (Lib Dem) |

== Election results ==
=== 2007 Scottish Parliament election ===
In the 2007 Scottish Parliament election the region elected MSPs as follows:

- 5 Labour MSPs (all constituency members)
- 5 Scottish National Party MSPs (all additional members)
- 4 Conservative MSPs (three constituency members and one additional member)
- 2 Liberal Democrat MSPs (one constituency member and one additional member)

==== Constituency results ====
2007 Scottish Parliament election: South of Scotland
| Constituency | Elected member | Result |
|---|---|---|
| Ayr | John Scott | Conservative hold |
| Carrick, Cumnock and Doon Valley | Cathy Jamieson | Labour hold |
| Clydesdale | Karen Gillon | Labour hold |
| Cunninghame South | Irene Oldfather | Labour hold |
| Dumfries | Elaine Murray | Labour hold |
| East Lothian | Iain Gray | Labour hold |
| Galloway and Upper Nithsdale | Alex Fergusson | Conservative hold |
| Roxburgh and Berwickshire | John Lamont | Conservative gain from Liberal Democrats |
| Tweeddale, Ettrick and Lauderdale | Jeremy Purvis | Liberal Democrats hold |

==== Additional member results ====
2007 Scottish Parliament election: South of Scotland
| Party | Elected candidates | Seats | +/− | Votes | % | +/−% |
|---|---|---|---|---|---|---|
| Labour | | 0 | 0 | 79,762 | 28.8 | -1.2 |
| SNP | Christine Grahame; Michael Russell; Adam Ingram; Alasdair Morgan; Aileen Campbell | 5 | +2 | 77,053 | 27.8 | +9.4 |
| Conservative | Derek Brownlee | 1 | -1 | 62,475 | 22.6 | -1.7 |
| Liberal Democrats | Jim Hume | 1 | +1 | 28,040 | 10.1 | -0.1 |
| Green | | 0 | -1 | 9,254 | 3.3 | -2.4 |
| Scottish Senior Citizens | | 0 | 0 | 5,335 | 1.9 | N/A |
| Solidarity | | 0 | 0 | 3,433 | 1.2 | N/A |
| BNP | | 0 | 0 | 3,212 | 1.2 | N/A |
| Scottish Christian | | 0 | 0 | 2,353 | 0.8 | N/A |
| Socialist Labour | | 0 | 0 | 1,633 | 0.6 | -0.6 |
| UKIP | | 0 | 0 | 1,429 | 0.5 | -0.2 |
| Scottish Socialist | | 0 | -1 | 1,114 | 0.4 | -5.0 |
| CPA | | 0 | 0 | 839 | 0.3 | N/A |
| Scottish Voice | | 0 | 0 | 490 | 0.2 | N/A |
| Independent | | 0 | 0 | 488 | 0.2 | N/A |

=== 2003 Scottish Parliament election ===
In the 2003 Scottish Parliament election the region elected MSPs as follows:

- 5 Labour MSPs (all constituency members)
- 4 Conservative MSP (two constituency members and two additional members)
- 3 Scottish National Party MSPs (all additional members)
- 2 Liberal Democrat MSPs (both constituency members)
- 1 Scottish Greens MSP (additional member)
- 1 Scottish Socialist Party MSP (additional member)

==== Constituency results ====
2003 Scottish Parliament election: South of Scotland
| Constituency | Elected member | Result |
|---|---|---|
| Ayr | John Scott | Conservative |
| Carrick, Cumnock and Doon Valley | Cathy Jamieson | Labour |
| Clydesdale | Karen Gillon | Labour |
| Cunninghame South | Irene Oldfather | Labour |
| Dumfries | Elaine Murray | Labour |
| East Lothian | John Home Robertson | Labour |
| Galloway and Upper Nithsdale | Alex Fergusson | Conservative |
| Roxburgh and Berwickshire | Euan Robson | Liberal Democrats |
| Tweeddale, Ettrick and Lauderdale | Jeremy Purvis | Liberal Democrats |

==== Additional member results ====
2003 Scottish Parliament election: South of Scotland
| Party | Elected candidates | Seats | +/− | Votes | % | +/−% |
|---|---|---|---|---|---|---|
| Labour | | 0 | 0 | 78,955 | 30.0 | -1.0 |
| Conservative | Phil Gallie; David Mundell | 2 | −1 | 63,827 | 24.2 | +2.6 |
| SNP | Christine Grahame; Adam Ingram; Alasdair Morgan | 3 | ±0 | 48,371 | 18.4 | -6.7 |
| Liberal Democrats | | 0 | 0 | 27,026 | 10.3 | -1.7 |
| Green | Chris Ballance | 1 | +1 | 15,062 | 5.7 | +2.7 |
| Scottish Socialist | Rosemary Byrne | 1 | +1 | 14,228 | 5.4 | +4.4 |
| Scottish Pensioners | | 0 | 0 | 9,082 | 3.4 | N/A |
| Socialist Labour | | 0 | 0 | 3,054 | 1.2 | -3.2 |
| UKIP | | 0 | 0 | 1,889 | 0.7 | +0.2 |
| Scottish People's | | 0 | 0 | 1,436 | 0.5 | N/A |
| Rural Party | | 0 | 0 | 355 | 0.1 | N/A |

Changes

- Derek Brownlee replaced David Mundell. Mundell resigned as an MSP in June 2005 following his election to Westminster in the 2005 general election. Brownlee was next on the Conservative list.
- Rosemary Byrne resigned from the Scottish Socialist Party in September 2006 and then sat as a member of Solidarity.

=== 1999 Scottish Parliament election ===
In the 1999 Scottish Parliament election the region elected MSPs as follows:

- 6 Labour MSPs (all constituency members)
- 4 Scottish National Party MSPs (one constituency member and three additional members)
- 4 Conservative MSPs (all additional members)
- 2 Liberal Democrat MSPs (both constituency members)

==== Constituency results ====
1999 Scottish Parliament election: South of Scotland
| Constituency | Elected member | Result |
|---|---|---|
| Ayr | Ian Welsh | Scottish Labour win (new seat) |
| Carrick, Cumnock and Doon Valley | Cathy Jamieson | Scottish Labour win (new seat) |
| Clydesdale | Karen Turnbull | Scottish Labour win (new seat) |
| Cunninghame South | Irene Oldfather | Scottish Labour win (new seat) |
| Dumfries | Elaine Murray | Scottish Labour win (new seat) |
| East Lothian | John Home Robertson | Scottish Labour win (new seat) |
| Galloway and Upper Nithsdale | Alasdair Morgan | Scottish National Party win (new seat) |
| Roxburgh and Berwickshire | Euan Robson | Scottish Liberal Democrats win (new seat) |
| Tweeddale, Ettrick and Lauderdale | Ian Jenkins | Scottish Liberal Democrats win (new seat) |

Changes:

- On 21 December 1999 Ian Welsh resigned, citing family reasons. He was the first MSP to resign, and as of 2005 remains the shortest serving MSP serving 230 days. At the subsequent Ayr by-election in 2000, John Scott won the seat for the Conservatives.

==== Additional member results ====
1999 Scottish Parliament election: South of Scotland
| Party | Elected candidates | Seats | +/− | Votes | % | +/−% |
|---|---|---|---|---|---|---|
| Labour | | 0 | N/A | 98,836 | 31.0 | N/A |
| SNP | Michael Russell; Adam Ingram; Christine Creech | 3 | N/A | 80,059 | 25.1 | N/A |
| Conservative | Phil Gallie; Alex Fergusson; Murray Tosh; David Mundell | 4 | N/A | 68,904 | 21.6 | N/A |
| Liberal Democrats | | 0 | N/A | 38,157 | 12.0 | N/A |
| Socialist Labour | | 0 | N/A | 13,887 | 4.4 | N/A |
| Green | | 0 | N/A | 9,467 | 3.0 | N/A |
| Liberal | | 0 | N/A | 3,478 | 1.1 | N/A |
| Scottish Socialist | | 0 | N/A | 3,304 | 1.0 | N/A |
| UKIP | | 0 | N/A | 1,502 | 0.5 | N/A |
| Natural Law | | 0 | N/A | 755 | 0.2 | N/A |
