= Tweeddale, Ettrick and Lauderdale =

Tweeddale, Ettrick and Lauderdale, may refer to:

- Tweeddale, Ettrick and Lauderdale (Scottish Parliament constituency)
- Tweeddale, Ettrick and Lauderdale (UK Parliament constituency)
