= Lyndsay McIntosh =

Scottish politician (born 1955)

Member of the Scottish Parliament for Central Scotland (1 of 7 Regional MSPs)
- In office 6 May 1999 – 31 March 2003

Personal details
- Born: 12 June 1955 (age 70) Glasgow, Scotland
- Party: New Party (2003–2010)
- Other political affiliations: Scottish Conservatives (until 2003)

Lyndsay June McIntosh (born 12 June 1955) is a Scottish former politician who was a Conservative Member of the Scottish Parliament (MSP) for the Central Scotland region from 1999 to 2003.

== Career ==
After being elected to Holyrood, she was the Conservative deputy spokeswoman on home affairs. Prior to the 2003 election, she was moved from first to third place on the Conservative's list for Central Scotland. After parliament was dissolved she followed her colleague Keith Harding and defected to the newly formed Scottish People's Alliance. She subsequently fought Kilmarnock and Loudoun for the SPA but came in a very poor eighth place with only 371 votes (1.2%).

McIntosh became a member of the national policy committee of the New Party, the successor to the SPA.
