= 2003 Scottish Parliament election =

- 1 May 2003

All 129 seats to the Scottish Parliament 65 seats were needed for a majority
- Registered: 3,877,460
- Turnout: Constituency - 49.7% ▼8.7pp Regional - 49.7% ▼8.6pp
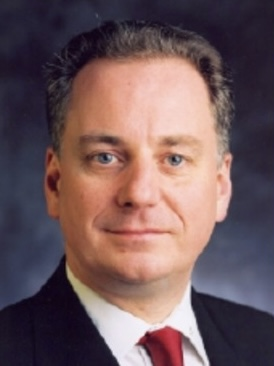

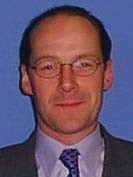

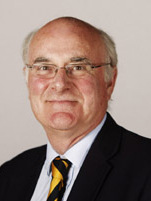

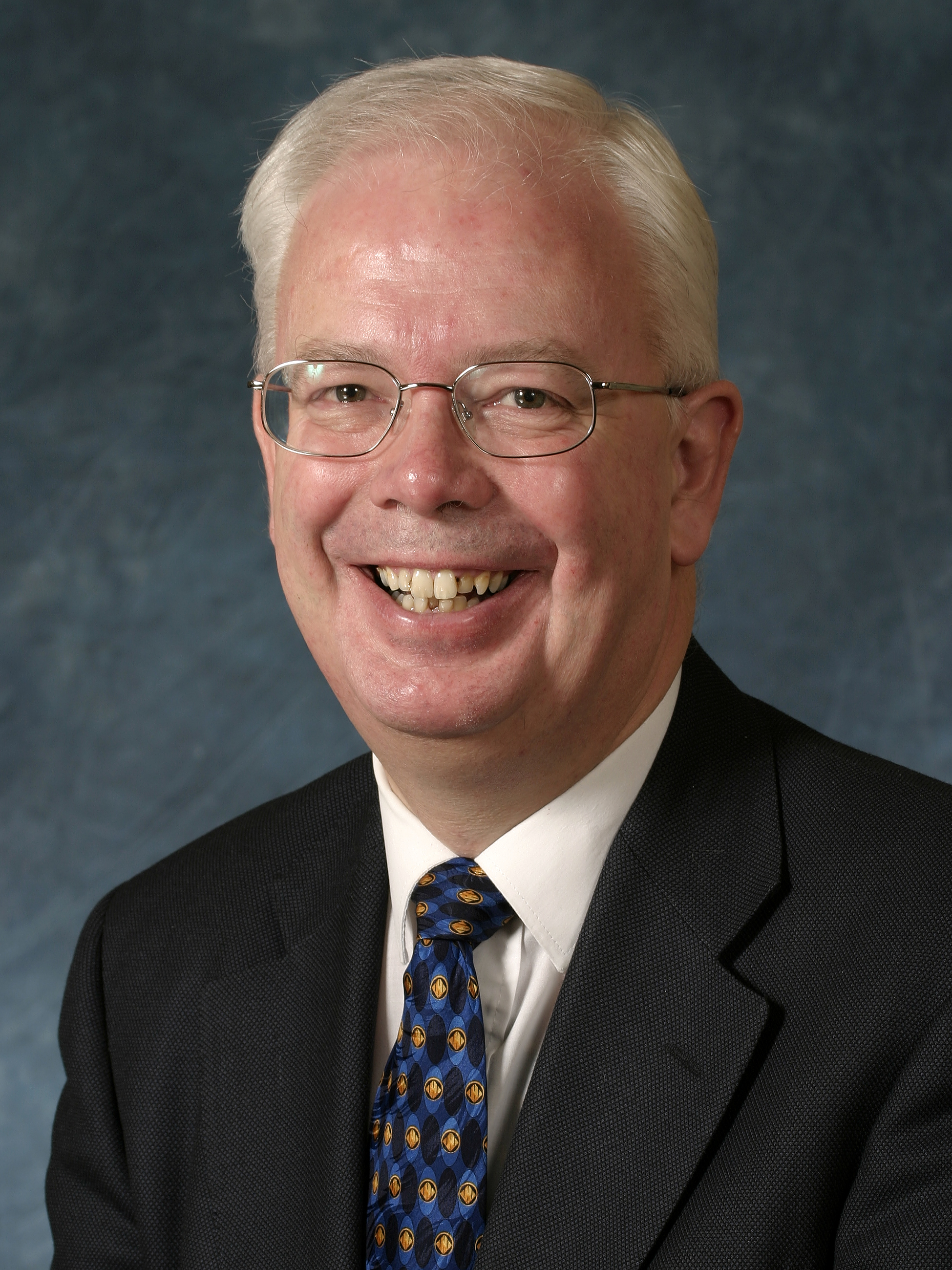

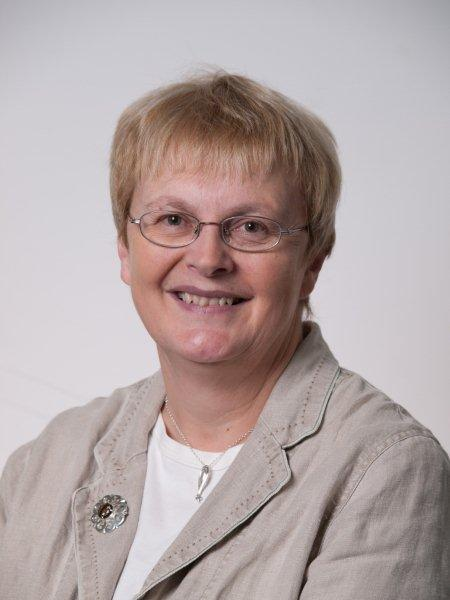

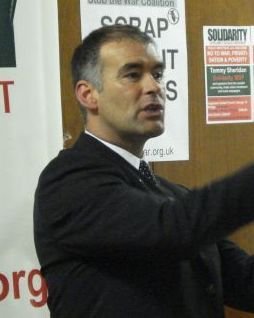
	First party	Second party	Third party
Leader	Jack McConnell	John Swinney	David McLetchie
Party	Labour	SNP	Conservative
Leader since	22 November 2001	23 September 2000	6 September 1998
Leader's seat	Motherwell and Wishaw	North Tayside	Edinburgh Pentlands (Note: Previously MSP for Lothians region from 1999-2003, before being elected to Edinburgh Pentlands at this election.)
Last election	56 (Note: Includes 9 MSPs sponsored by the Co-operative Party, who are designated Labour and Co-operative.) seats	35 seats	18 seats
Seats before	55 (Note: Includes 10 MSPs sponsored by the Co-operative Party, who are designated Labour and Co-operative.)	33	19
Seats won	50 (Note: Includes 10 MSPs sponsored by the Co-operative Party, who are designated Labour and Co-operative.)	27	18
Seat change	▼6	▼8	Steady
Constituency vote	663,585	455,722	318,279
% and swing	34.6% ▼4.2%	23.8% ▼4.9%	16.6% ▲1.2%
Regional vote	561,375	399,659	296,929
% and swing	29.3% ▼4.3%	20.9% ▼6.4%	15.6% ▲0.1%
	Fourth party	Fifth party	Sixth party
Leader	Jim Wallace	Eleanor Scott (Note: Eleanor Scott served as the Scottish Green Convenor during the 2003 election, while Robin Harper MSP served as the public campaign leader and principal speaker.)	Tommy Sheridan
Party	Liberal Democrats	Green	Scottish Socialist
Leader since	18 April 1992	27 October 2002	1998
Leader's seat	Orkney	Ran in Highlands and Islands (won)	Glasgow
Last election	17 seats	1 seat	1 seat
Seats before	16	1	1
Seats won	17	7	6
Seat change	Steady	▲6	▲5
Constituency vote	294,347	Did not contest	118,764
% and swing	15.4% ▲1.2%	Did not contest	6.2% ▲5.2%
Regional vote	225,774	132,138	128,026
% and swing	11.8% ▼0.6%	6.9% ▲3.3%	6.7% ▲4.7%
- The map shows the election results in single-member constituencies. The additional member MSPs in the 8 regions are shown around the map.
First Minister before election
Jack McConnell (Labour)
Labour–Liberal Democrats
First Minister and Government after election
Jack McConnell (Labour)
Labour–Liberal Democrats

An election for the Scottish Parliament was held on 1 May 2003, and was the second election of members of the Scottish Parliament. It brought no change in terms of control of the Scottish Executive. Jack McConnell, the Labour Party MSP, remained in office as First Minister for a second term and the Executive continued as a Labour and Liberal Democrat coalition. As of 2025, it remains the last Scottish Parliament election victory for the Scottish Labour Party, and the last time the Scottish National Party lost a Holyrood election.

The results also showed rises in support for smaller parties, including the Scottish Green Party and the Scottish Socialist Party (SSP) and declines in support for the Labour Party and the Scottish National Party (SNP). The Conservative and Unionist Party and the Scottish Liberal Democrats each polled almost exactly the same percentage of the vote as they had in the 1999 election, with each holding the same number of seats as before.

Three independent MSPs were elected: Dennis Canavan, Margo MacDonald and Jean Turner. John Swinburne, leader of the Scottish Senior Citizens Unity Party, was also elected. This led to talk of a "rainbow" Parliament, but the arithmetic meant that the coalition of Labour and Scottish Liberal Democrats could continue in office, which they did until the 2007 election.

The decline in support for the SNP was viewed by some as a rejection of the case for Scottish independence. Others argued against this, pointing out that the number of MSPs in favour of independence actually rose because most of the minor parties such as the SSP share this position with the SNP.

== Retiring MSPs ==
At the dissolution of Parliament on 31 March 2003, ten MSPs were not seeking re-election.

Constituency/Region	Departing MSP	Party
Glasgow	Dorothy-Grace Elder	Independent
West of Scotland	Colin Campbell	SNP
Highlands and Islands	Duncan Hamilton	SNP
Highlands and Islands	Winnie Ewing	SNP
West of Scotland	Kay Ullrich	SNP
North East Scotland	Ben Wallace	Conservative
West of Scotland	John Young	Conservative
Central Fife	Henry McLeish	Labour
Tweeddale, Ettrick and Lauderdale	Ian Jenkins	Liberal Democrats
Lothians	David Steel	Liberal Democrats

== Campaign ==
The parliament was dissolved on 31 March 2003 and the campaign began thereafter.

== Party leaders in 2003 ==
- Labour – Jack McConnell
- SNP – John Swinney
- Conservative – David McLetchie
- Liberal Democrat – Jim Wallace
- Greens – Robin Harper & Eleanor Scott (co-chairs)
- SSP – Tommy Sheridan

=== Defeated MSPs ===
==== Labour ====
- Brian Fitzpatrick, Strathkelvin and Bearsden
- Rhoda Grant, Highlands and Islands
- Iain Gray, Edinburgh Pentlands
- Angus MacKay, Edinburgh South
- Richard Simpson, Ochil
- Elaine Thomson, Aberdeen North

==== SNP ====
- Kenneth Gibson, Glasgow
- Irene McGugan, North East Scotland
- Fiona McLeod, West of Scotland
- Gil Paterson, Central Scotland
- Lloyd Quinan, West of Scotland
- Michael Russell, South of Scotland
- Andrew Wilson, Central Scotland

==== The New Party ====
- Keith Harding, Mid Scotland and Fife (elected as a Conservative)
- Lyndsay McIntosh, Central Scotland (elected as a Conservative)

== Results ==
Election result with constituency names labeled

← 2003 Scottish Parliament election →
Party	Constituencies					Regional additional members					Total seats		
Party	Votes	%	±	Seats	±	Votes	%	±	Seats	±	Total	±	%
Labour	663,585	34.6	▼4.2	46	▼7	561,375	29.3	▼4.3	4	▲1	50 (Note: Includes 10 MSPs sponsored by the Co-operative Party, who are designated Labour and Co-operative.)	▼6	38.8
SNP	455,722	23.8	▼4.9	9	▲2	399,659	20.9	▼6.4	18	▼10	27	▼8	20.9
Conservative	318,279	16.6	▲1.2	3	▲3	296,929	15.5	▲0.1	15	▼3	18	Steady	14.0
Liberal Democrats	294,347	15.4	▲1.2	13	▲1	225,774	11.8	▼0.6	4	▼1	17	Steady	13.2
Green	–	–	–	–	–	132,138	6.9	▲3.3	7	▲6	7	▲6	5.4
Scottish Socialist	118,764	6.2	▲5.2	0	Steady	128,026	6.7	▲4.7	6	▲5	6	▲5	4.7
Scottish Senior Citizens	1,597	0.1	new	0	new	28,966	1.5	new	1	new	1	new	0.8
Margo MacDonald	–	–	–	–	–	27,143	1.4	new	1	new	1	new	0.8
MSP for Falkirk West	14,703	0.8	Steady	1	Steady	–	–	–	–	–	1	Steady	0.8
Save Stobhill Hospital	10,988	0.6	new	1	new	–	–	–	–	–	1	new	0.8
Pensioners Party	–	–	–	–	–	28,655	1.5	new	0	new	0	new	0.0
Socialist Labour	–	–	–	–	–	21,657	1.1	▼1.3	0	Steady	0	Steady	0.0
New Party	5,598	0.3	new	0	new	7,718	0.4	new	0	new	0	new	0.0
UKIP	–	–	–	–	–	11,969	0.6	new	0	new	0	new	0.0
Scottish Unionist	–	–	–	–	–	6,113	0.3	Steady	0	Steady	0	Steady	0.0
Local Health Concern	5,582	0.3	new	0	new	–	–	–	–	–	0	new	0.0
Fishing Party	–	–	–	–	–	5,566	0.3	new	0	new	0	new	0.0
BNP	–	–	–	–	–	2,344	0.1	new	0	new	0	new	0.0
Protect Rural Scotland	–	–	–	–	–	1,438	0.1	new	0	new	0	new	0.0
Independent Green Voice	1,300	0.1	new	0	new	–	–	–	–	–	0	new	0.0
Christian Independent Alliance	–	–	–	–	–	1,064	0.1	new	0	new	0	new	0.0
Adam Lyal's Witchery Tour	–	–	–	–	–	964	0.1	new	0	new	0	new	0.0
Parents Excluded	141	0.0	new	0	new	–	–	–	–	–	0	new	0.0
Others	25,968	1.4	▲0.8	0	Steady	28,323	1.5	▲0.8	0	Steady	0	Steady	0.0
Valid votes	1,916,574	99.4	▼0.3			1,915,851	99.4	▼0.3					
Spoilt votes	12,303	0.6	▲0.3			11,938	0.6	▲0.3					
Total	1,928,877	100		73	–	1,927,789	100		56	–	129	–	100
Electorate/Turnout	3,877,460	49.7	▼8.7			3,877,460	49.7	▼8.6					

Notes:

- The Scottish Greens did not stand in any constituencies, instead concentrating their resources on winning the largest possible share of the "second" vote for 'list' seats.

Popular Vote (Constituency)
Labour	34.62%
SNP	23.78%
Conservative	16.61%
Liberal Democrats	15.36%
Scottish Socialist	6.20%
Other	3.43%

Popular Vote (Regional)
Labour	29.44%
SNP	20.94%
Conservative	15.56%
Liberal Democrats	11.83%
Green	6.92%
Scottish Socialist	6.71%
Independents	1.67%
SSCUP	1.52%
Pensioners	1.50%
Socialist Labour	1.13%
Other	2.74%

Parliament seats
Labour	38.76%
SNP	20.93%
Conservative	13.95%
Liberal Democrats	13.18%
Green	5.43%
Scottish Socialist	4.65%
Independents	2.33%
SSCUP	0.78%

== Constituency and regional summary ==
=== Central Scotland ===
2003 Scottish Parliament election: Central Scotland
Constituency	Elected member	Result
Airdrie and Shotts	Karen Whitefield	Labour hold
Coatbridge and Chryston	Elaine Smith	Labour hold
Cumbernauld and Kilsyth	Cathie Craigie	Labour hold
East Kilbride	Andy Kerr	Labour hold
Falkirk East	Cathy Peattie	Labour hold
Falkirk West	Dennis Canavan	Independent hold
Hamilton North and Bellshill	Michael McMahon	Labour hold
Hamilton South	Tom McCabe	Labour hold
Kilmarnock and Loudoun	Margaret Jamieson	Labour hold
Motherwell and Wishaw	Jack McConnell	Labour hold

2003 Scottish Parliament election: Central Scotland
Party	Elected candidates	Seats	+/−	Votes	%	+/−%
SNP	Alex Neil; Michael Matheson; Linda Fabiani	3	−2	59,274	22.53	-5.25
Conservative	Margaret Mitchell	1	±0	24,121	9.17	+0.02
Scottish Socialist	Carolyn Leckie	1	+1	19,016	7.23	+5.49
Scottish Senior Citizens	John Swinburne	1	+1	17,146	6.52	N/A
Liberal Democrats	Donald Gorrie	1	±0	15,494	5.89	-0.31

=== Glasgow ===
2003 Scottish Parliament election: Glasgow
Constituency	Elected member	Result
Glasgow Anniesland	Bill Butler	Labour hold
Glasgow Baillieston	Margaret Curran	Labour hold
Glasgow Cathcart	Mike Watson	Labour hold
Glasgow Govan	Gordon Jackson	Labour hold
Glasgow Kelvin	Pauline McNeill	Labour hold
Glasgow Maryhill	Patricia Ferguson	Labour hold
Glasgow Pollok	Johann Lamont	Labour hold
Glasgow Rutherglen	Janis Hughes	Labour hold
Glasgow Shettleston	Frank McAveety	Labour hold
Glasgow Springburn	Paul Martin	Labour hold

2003 Scottish Parliament election: Glasgow
Party	Elected candidates	Seats	+/−	Votes	%	+/−%
SNP	Nicola Sturgeon; Sandra White	2	−2	34,894	17.1	-8.4
Scottish Socialist	Tommy Sheridan; Rosie Kane	2	+1	31,216	15.2	+8.0
Conservative	Bill Aitken	1	±0	15,299	7.5	-0.4
Liberal Democrats	Robert Brown	1	±0	14,839	7.5	-0.4
Green	Patrick Harvie	1	+1	14,570	7.1	+3.1

=== Highlands and Islands ===
2003 Scottish Parliament election: Highlands and Islands
Constituency	Elected member	Result
Argyll and Bute	George Lyon	Liberal Democrats hold
Caithness, Sutherland and Easter Ross	Jamie Stone	Liberal Democrats hold
Inverness East, Nairn and Lochaber	Fergus Ewing	SNP hold
Moray	Margaret Ewing	SNP hold
Orkney	Jim Wallace	Liberal Democrats hold
Ross, Skye and Inverness West	John Farquhar Munro	Liberal Democrats hold
Shetland	Tavish Scott	Liberal Democrats hold
Western Isles	Alasdair Morrison	Labour hold

2003 Scottish Parliament election: Highlands and Islands
Party	Elected candidates	Seats	+/−	Votes	%	+/−%
SNP	Jim Mather; Rob Gibson	2	±0	39,497	23.43	-4.3
Labour	Peter Peacock; Maureen Macmillan	2	−1	37,605	22.31	-3.16
Conservative	Jamie McGrigor; Mary Scanlon	2	±0	26,989	16.01	+1.07
Green	Eleanor Scott	1	+1	13,935	8.27	+4.52

=== Lothians ===
2003 Scottish Parliament election: Lothians
Constituency	Elected member	Result
Edinburgh Central	Sarah Boyack	Labour hold
Edinburgh East and Musselburgh	Susan Deacon	Labour hold
Edinburgh North and Leith	Malcolm Chisholm	Labour hold
Edinburgh Pentlands	David McLetchie	Conservative gain from Labour
Edinburgh South	Mike Pringle	Liberal Democrats gain from Labour
Edinburgh West	Margaret Smith	Liberal Democrats hold
Linlithgow	Mary Mulligan	Labour hold
Livingston	Bristow Muldoon	Labour hold
Midlothian	Rhona Brankin	Labour hold

2003 Scottish Parliament election: Lothians
Party	Elected candidates	Seats	+/−	Votes	%	+/−%
SNP	Kenny MacAskill; Fiona Hyslop	2	−1	43,142	16.2	-9.5
Conservative	James Douglas-Hamilton	1	−1	40,173	15.1	-0.6
Green	Robin Harper; Mark Ballard	2	+1	31,908	12.0	+5.1
Independent	Margo MacDonald	1	+1	27,143	10.2	N/A
Scottish Socialist	Colin Fox	1	+1	14,448	5.4	+3.8

=== Mid Scotland and Fife ===
2003 Scottish Parliament election: Mid Scotland and Fife
Constituency	Elected member	Result
Dunfermline East	Helen Eadie	Labour hold
Dunfermline West	Scott Barrie	Labour hold
Fife Central	Christine May	Labour hold
Fife North East	Iain Smith	Liberal Democrats hold
Kirkcaldy	Marilyn Livingstone	Labour hold
North Tayside	John Swinney	SNP hold
Ochil	George Reid	SNP gain from Labour
Perth	Roseanna Cunningham	SNP hold
Stirling	Sylvia Jackson	Labour hold

2003 Scottish Parliament election: Mid Scotland and Fife
Party	Elected candidates	Seats	+/−	Votes	%	+/−%
SNP	Bruce Crawford; Tricia Marwick	2	−1	57,631	23.0	-5.7
Conservative	Murdo Fraser; Brian Monteith; Ted Brocklebank	3	±0	43,941	17.6	-1.0
Liberal Democrats	Keith Raffan	1	±0	30,112	12.0	-0.7
Green	Mark Ruskell	1	+1	17,147	6.9	+3.0

=== North East Scotland ===
2003 Scottish Parliament election: North East Scotland
Constituency	Elected member	Result
Aberdeen Central	Lewis Macdonald	Labour hold
Aberdeen North	Brian Adam	SNP gain from Labour
Aberdeen South	Nicol Stephen	Liberal Democrats hold
Angus	Andrew Welsh	SNP hold
Banff and Buchan	Stewart Stevenson	SNP hold
Dundee East	Shona Robison	SNP gain from Labour
Dundee West	Kate Maclean	Labour hold
Gordon	Nora Radcliffe	Liberal Democrats hold
West Aberdeenshire and Kincardine	Mike Rumbles	Liberal Democrats hold

2003 Scottish Parliament election: North East Scotland
Party	Elected candidates	Seats	+/−	Votes	%	+/−%
SNP	Richard Lochhead	1	−3	66,463	27.3	-5.0
Labour	Marlyn Glen; Richard Baker	2	+2	49,189	20.2	-5.3
Conservative	David Davidson; Nanette Milne; Alex Johnstone	3	±0	42,318	17.4	-0.9
Green	Shiona Baird	1	+1	12,724	5.2	+2.4

=== South of Scotland ===
2003 Scottish Parliament election: South of Scotland
Constituency	Elected member	Result
Ayr	John Scott	Conservative gain from Labour
Carrick, Cumnock and Doon Valley	Cathy Jamieson	Labour hold
Clydesdale	Karen Gillon	Labour hold
Cunninghame South	Irene Oldfather	Labour hold
Dumfries	Elaine Murray	Labour hold
East Lothian	John Home Robertson	Labour hold
Galloway and Upper Nithsdale	Alex Fergusson	Conservative gain from SNP
Roxburgh and Berwickshire	Euan Robson	Liberal Democrats hold
Tweeddale, Ettrick and Lauderdale	Jeremy Purvis	Liberal Democrats hold

2003 Scottish Parliament election: South of Scotland
Party	Elected candidates	Seats	+/−	Votes	%	+/−%
Conservative	Phil Gallie; David Mundell	2	−2	63,827	24.2	+2.6
SNP	Christine Grahame; Adam Ingram; Alasdair Morgan	3	±0	48,371	18.4	-6.7
Green	Chris Ballance	1	+1	15,062	5.7	+2.7
Scottish Socialist	Rosemary Byrne	1	+1	14,228	5.4	+4.4

=== West of Scotland ===
2003 Scottish Parliament election: West of Scotland
Constituency	Elected member	Result
Clydebank and Milngavie	Des McNulty	Labour hold
Cunninghame North	Allan Wilson	Labour hold
Dumbarton	Jackie Baillie	Labour hold
Eastwood	Kenneth Macintosh	Labour hold
Greenock and Inverclyde	Duncan McNeil	Labour hold
Paisley North	Wendy Alexander	Labour hold
Paisley South	Hugh Henry	Labour hold
Strathkelvin and Bearsden	Jean Turner	Independent gain from Labour
West Renfrewshire	Patricia Godman	Labour hold

2003 Scottish Parliament election: West of Scotland
Party	Elected candidates	Seats	+/−	Votes	%	+/−%
SNP	Campbell Martin; Bruce McFee; Stewart Maxwell	3	−1	50,387	19.6	-6.3
Conservative	Annabel Goldie; Murray Tosh	2	±0	40,261	15.7	–
Liberal Democrats	Ross Finnie	1	±0	31,580	12.3	+1.3
Scottish Socialist	Frances Curran	1	+1	18,591	7.2	+5.3

== Coalition ==
As part of the coalition deal between Labour and the Scottish Liberal Democrats, Labour allowed proportional representation (a long-standing Lib Dem policy) to be used in Scottish local government elections. This system was first used in 2007.

== Campaign spending ==
Party	Expenses
Scottish People's	£188,889
Liberal Democrats	£130,358
Scottish Socialist	£74,361
Green	£65,852
UKIP	£39,504
Scottish Senior Citizens	£3,558

== See also ==
- 2nd Scottish Parliament
- 2003 National Assembly for Wales election
- 2003 United Kingdom local elections

== Party manifestos ==
- British National Party – Freedom
- Pro-Life Alliance
- Scottish Liberal Democrats – Make the difference
- Scottish National Party – Release our potential
- Scottish Socialist Party – another Scotland is possible
