= Derek Brownlee =

British politician (born 1974)

Member of the Scottish Parliament for South of Scotland (1 of 7 Regional MSPs)
- In office 17 June 2005 – 22 March 2011
- Preceded by: David Mundell (Note: Normally, regional MSPs do not have individual predecessors and successors. However, Mundell retired his seat during a sitting parliament so was succeeded by Brownlee.)

Personal details
- Born: 10 August 1974 (age 52)
- Party: Scottish Conservative Party
- Education: University of Aberdeen
- Profession: accountant

Derek Brownlee (born 10 August 1974) is a Scottish accountant and politician. A member of the Scottish Conservative Party, he was a Member of the Scottish Parliament (MSP) for the South of Scotland region from 2005 to 2011.

== Background ==
Brownlee grew up in Selkirk, Scottish Borders and went to Selkirk High School. He graduated in Scots Law LLB (Hons) from the University of Aberdeen in 1996, and then trained as a chartered accountant. He worked as a chartered accountant at Ernst & Young from 1996 to 2002, the Institute of Directors from 2002 to 2004 and Deloitte from 2004 to 2005.

== Political career ==
In the 2003 Scottish Parliament election Brownlee stood as the Conservative candidate in Tweeddale, Ettrick and Lauderdale constituency, finishing fourth but within 1,500 votes of winning the seat.

He became an MSP on 17 April 2005, following David Mundell resigning his regional seat at Holyrood following his election as MP for Dumfriesshire, Clydesdale and Tweeddale constituency in the 2005 General Election. Brownlee was next on the Conservative's list for the South of Scotland region. Brownlee was appointed the Conservative's finance spokesman in Holyrood in July 2005, replacing Annabel Goldie who became the party's leader in Scotland.

Brownlee stood at the 2007 Holyrood elections, contesting the Tweeddale, Ettrick and Lauderdale constituency, coming third – pushing the Labour candidate into fourth place. He was again elected as an additional member for the South of Scotland region. After the 2007 election, Brownlee was a member of the Scottish Parliament's Finance Committee and a substitute member of the Scottish Commission for Public Audit.

In 2010 Brownlee was selected by the East Lothian Conservative Party as their candidate for the East Lothian at the 2011 Holyrood election. Brownlee was placed at the top of the Conservatives' South Scotland list after a ballot of party members. At the 2011 election, the Conservatives took three constituency seats in the region but no regional seats and Brownlee failed to be re-elected.
