= Jim Hume =

British politician (born 1962)

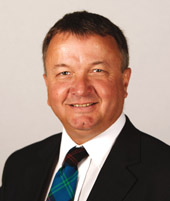

Member of the Scottish Parliament for South Scotland
- In office 3 May 2007 – 24 March 2016

Personal details
- Born: Peebles, Scottish Borders, Scotland
- Education: University of Edinburgh

Jim Hume MBA FRSA ARAgS HonAssoc BVA is a former Scottish Liberal Democrat politician. He was a Member of the Scottish Parliament (MSP) of the South of Scotland region from May 2007 to March 2016. He is currently Director of Public Affairs & Communications at Change Mental Health and Convenes the National Rural Mental Health Forum.

== Background ==
Hume was born in Peebles but raised in Selkirkshire. His previous positions include Chairman of "Environment and Land Use" for the National Farmers Union of Scotland (NFUS) and President of Lothians and Borders NFUS. He was active during the Foot-and-mouth crisis of 2001. Hume was also chair of the Borders Foundation for Rural Sustainability and was on the board of Scottish Enterprise Borders, a member of the Forestry Commission's South of Scotland Regional Forum, a Trustee of The Borders Forest Trust and a founding Director of the Scottish Enterprise’s South of Scotland Loan Fund Scheme all before being elected to the Scottish Parliament in 2007.

== Member of the Scottish Parliament ==
Hume was elected to the Scottish Parliament to represent the South of Scotland region at the 2007 general election, making him the first Liberal Democrat MSP in the region since the Scottish Parliament was created in 1999. He was also elected councillor of the Galashiels and District region of Scottish Borders Council on the same night. Hume was Scottish Liberal Democrat Spokesman for Housing and Health. He sat on the Scottish Parliament's Rural Affairs, Climate Change and Environment Committee, and was the committee's EU Reporter. He was also the Scottish Liberal Democrat Deputy Whip and a member of the European Committee of Regions.

In December 2014, Hume successfully introduced a Member's Bill in the Scottish Parliament, the Smoking Prohibition (Children in Motor Vehicles) (Scotland) Bill. It was enacted in January 2016 and protects 60,000 children every week from the dangers of second hand smoke in cars. In the twelve months following his Bill, the number of children being exposed to second-hand smoke halved.

In October 2015, Hume called on Health Secretary Shona Robison to review support provided for gender identity clinics after new figures revealed that the average waiting time for a first appointment at two of Scotland's GICs was more than a year.

== Career timeline ==
Edinburgh School of Agriculture, Diploma in Agriculture

- 1997: University of Edinburgh, Masters in Business Administration (MBA)
- 1998 –2007: Farmer, partner, John Hume and Son (farming firm, Sundhope Farm, Yarrow, Selkirk)
- 2004–2006: Director of the National Farmers Union of Scotland (NFUS) President of Lothian & Borders NFUS
- 2000–2006: Trustee Borders Forest Trust (BFT)
- 2000–2001: Trustee Borders Foundation for Rural Sustainability (BFRS)
- 2001–2007: Chairman Borders Foundation for Rural Sustainability
- 2003–2007: Director Scottish Enterprise Borders (SEB)
- 2005–2007: Member of Forestry Commission Scotland's South of Scotland Regional Forum.
- February 2007– 4 May 2007: Director of the National Farmers Union of Scotland (NFUS): Chairman of NFUS Environment & Land Use.
- 2007 – 2016: Member of the Scottish Parliament for South of Scotland
- 2007–2011: Scottish Liberal Democrat Shadow Minister for the Environment
- 2007–2008: Member of The Scottish Parliament's Audit Committee
- 2008–2011: Member of The Scottish Parliament's European & External Relations Committee
- 2008–2011: Scottish Liberal Democrat Deputy Spokesperson on Environment, Rural Development and Energy
- 2009 – March 2011: Head of Scottish Parliamentary Campaigns
- 2011 – 2012: Scottish Liberal Democrat Spokesperson on Rural Affairs, Environment, Climate Change, Housing and Transport
- 2011 – 2016:. Member of the Scottish Parliament Rural Affairs, Climate Change & Environment Committee.
- 2011 – 2016: The Scottish Parliament Rural Affairs, Climate Change & Environment Committee's European Reporter.
- 2011 – 2016: Member of The European Union's Committee of Regions
- 2012–2016: Scottish Liberal Democrat Spokesperson on Health and Housing
- 2012–2016: Scottish Liberal Democrat Deputy Whip
- 2016 – 2018: Trustee of Tweed Forum
- 2016 – 2018: Board Member of The Broomhouse Centre
- 2016–present: Director of Policy, Public Affairs and Communications, Change Mental Health
- 2017–present: Convener of the National Rural & Islands Mental Health Forum
- 2017–present: Non-Executive Director of Scotland's Rural College (SRUC)
- 2018 – 2019: Vice Convener of the Scottish Parliament's Former Members' Association
- 2018-2025: Secretary to the Association of Former Members of the Scottish Parliament
- 2018 Associate of the Royal Agricultural Societies (ARAgS)
- 2018 Honorary Associate of the British Veterinary Association (HonAssoc BVA)
- 2019–present: Secretary to the Scottish Parliament's Former Members' Association
- 2019–present: Liveryman of The Worshipful Company of Farmers and Freeman of The City of London by presentation of The Company
- 2024–present: Chairman of The Health and Social Care Alliance Scotland
- 2025–present: Board Member of the Scottish Government's Interim National Care Service Board
- 2025–present: Chairman of Feniks, Counselling charity supporting central and eastern European community and refugees in Scotland
