= Ian Jenkins (politician) =

Scottish politician (1941–2025)

Member of the Scottish Parliament for Tweeddale, Ettrick and Lauderdale
- In office 6 May 1999 – 31 March 2003
- Preceded by: New Parliament
- Succeeded by: Jeremy Purvis

Personal details
- Born: 18 March 1941 Rothesay, Argyll and Bute, Scotland
- Died: 29 July 2025 (aged 84) Melrose, Scottish Borders, Scotland
- Party: Scottish Liberal Democrats

Archibald Ian Jenkins (18 March 1941 – 29 July 2025) was a Scottish Liberal Democrat politician. He was the Member of the Scottish Parliament (MSP) for Tweeddale, Ettrick and Lauderdale from 1999 to 2003.

== Life and career ==
Jenkins was born in Rothesay on 18 March 1941. He was educated at Rothesay Academy and the University of Glasgow, where he read English.

He was a teacher before his election to Holyrood, ending his career as head of the English department at Peebles High School. He was the Liberal Democrat spokesperson for Education, Culture and Sport. He stood down at the 2003 election.

Jenkins died in Melrose, Scottish Borders on 29 July 2025, at the age of 84.

Scottish Parliament
New parliament Scotland Act 1998	Member of the Scottish Parliament for Tweeddale, Ettrick and Lauderdale; 1999–2003	Succeeded by Jeremy Purvis
