= David Mundell =

Scottish politician and solicitor

The Right Honourable David Mundell WS MP
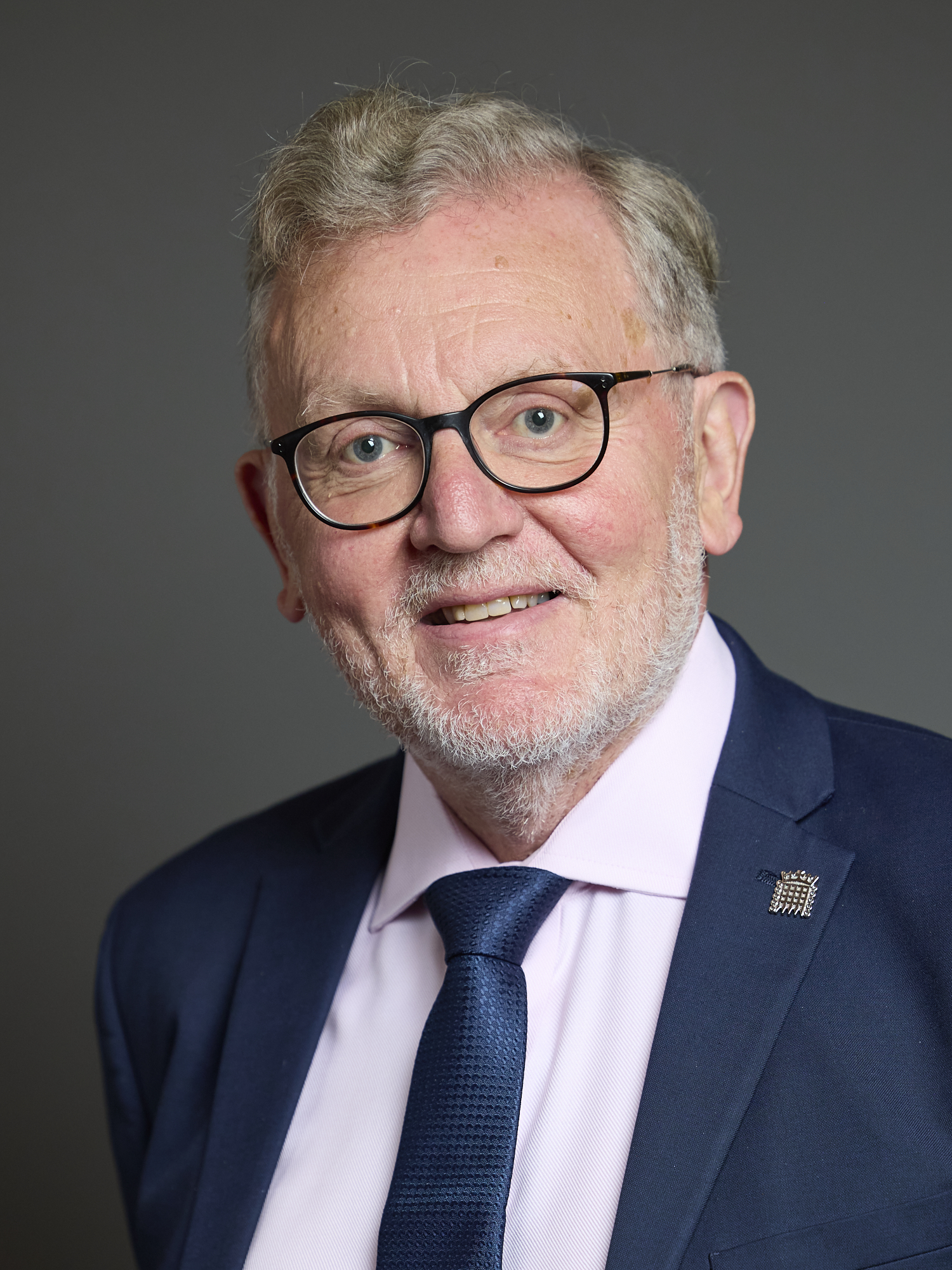
- Official portrait, 2024

Secretary of State for Scotland
- In office 11 May 2015 – 24 July 2019
- Prime Minister: David Cameron; Theresa May
- Preceded by: Alistair Carmichael
- Succeeded by: Alister Jack

Parliamentary Under-Secretary of State for Scotland
- In office 14 May 2010 – 11 May 2015
- Prime Minister: David Cameron
- Preceded by: Ann McKechin
- Succeeded by: The Lord Dunlop

Shadow Secretary of State for Scotland
- In office 7 December 2005 – 11 May 2010
- Leader: David Cameron
- Preceded by: Eleanor Laing
- Succeeded by: Jim Murphy

Member of Parliament for Dumfriesshire, Clydesdale and Tweeddale
- Incumbent
- Assumed office 5 May 2005
- Preceded by: Constituency established
- Majority: 4,242 (9.6%)

Member of the Scottish Parliament for South of Scotland (1 of 7 Regional MSPs)
- In office 6 May 1999 – 5 May 2005
- Preceded by: Constituency established
- Succeeded by: Derek Brownlee

Personal details
- Born: David Gordon Mundell; 27 May 1962 (age 64) Dumfries, Scotland
- Party: Conservative (1976–1981, since 1988)
- Other political affiliations: SDP (1981–1988)
- Spouse: Lynda Carmichael (m. 1987; div. 2012)
- Children: 3, including Oliver
- Education: University of Edinburgh; University of Strathclyde
- Website: davidmundell.com

David Gordon Mundell, WS (born 27 May 1962) is a Scottish Conservative Party politician and solicitor who has served as Member of Parliament (MP) for Dumfriesshire, Clydesdale and Tweeddale since 2005. He previously served as Secretary of State for Scotland from 2015 to 2019. Mundell was the first openly gay Conservative cabinet minister, coming out in 2016.

From 1999 to 2005, Mundell served as a Member of the Scottish Parliament (MSP) for the South of Scotland region. Once elected to the House of Commons, he served as Shadow Secretary of State for Scotland from 2005 to 2010 and Under-Secretary of State for Scotland from 2010 to 2015. He served in the Cabinet as Scotland Secretary from 2015 until 2019; the first Conservative to hold the position since Michael Forsyth in 1997.

== Early life and career ==
David Mundell was born on 27 May 1962 in Dumfries. He grew up in Newton Wamphray and Lockerbie, attending Lockerbie Academy. Mundell then studied Law at the University of Edinburgh, graduating with an MA and also gaining a Diploma in Legal Practice (Dip LP).

Having become a Young Conservative aged 14, he switched to the Social Democratic Party (SDP) while at university in 1981. In 2002, he stated: "the first Thatcher Government did get a bit bogged down and it wasn't really the radical government that subsequently emerged,... And the fact that you had a completely new opportunity to wipe the slate clean, with no baggage, was a very attractive thing".

Mundell practised as a solicitor before joining BT as Group Legal Advisor for Scotland in 1991. He became BT Scotland's Head of National Affairs, remaining with BT until being elected as an MSP.

== Political career ==
Mundell served as an SDP Councillor on Annandale and Eskdale District Council from 1984 to 1986, representing Dryfe ward, and then for Mid Annandale ward on Dumfries and Galloway Regional Council until 1987, whilst still a postgraduate student.

Mundell was first elected to the Scottish Parliament in 1999 as a Conservative as a list MSP for the South of Scotland. He was re-elected in 2003.

== Parliamentary career ==
At the 2005 general election, Mundell was elected to Parliament as MP for Dumfriesshire, Clydesdale and Tweeddale with 36.2% of the vote and a majority of 1,738. Following his election to Westminster, Mundell resigned from the Scottish Parliament in June 2005. As the sole Conservative Scottish parliamentary representative, David Cameron (as Leader of HM Opposition) appointed him Shadow Secretary of State for Scotland in December 2005.

In January 2009 Mundell was among the 18 MPs (either Scottish or representing Scottish constituencies) who supported the Commons Motion stating football "should not be any different from other competing sports and our young talent should be allowed to show their skills on the world stage", thereby endorsing the idea of Team GB entering a British football team in the London 2012 Olympics. Football's governing bodies in Scotland, Wales and Northern Ireland oppose a Great Britain team, fearing it would stop them competing as individual nations in future tournaments.

Mundell was re-elected as MP for Dumfriesshire, Clydesdale and Tweeddale at the 2010 general election with an increased vote share of 38% and an increased majority of 4,194. Following the election, he was given the non-cabinet role of Parliamentary Under-Secretary of State for Scotland. On 9 June 2010, Mundell was appointed a Privy Counsellor.

At the 2015 general election, Mundell was again re-elected, with an increased vote share of 39.8% and a decreased majority of 798.

In July 2015, Mundell opened a food bank in Dumfries and Galloway, which is adjacent to his own constituency and was at the time represented by the Scottish National Party's Richard Arkless. After the opening, Mundell was escorted from an angry anti-austerity demonstration by police. Mundell, who had previously denied that welfare reform changes were behind the increased demand for food banks, was accused of hypocrisy by opponents who said the opening was "nothing to celebrate".

In the Brexit referendum, Mundell supported Britain remaining within the EU. Following it, he became a part-time member of the cabinet committee working on strategies for Brexit.

At the snap 2017 general election, Mundell was again re-elected, with an increased vote share of 49.4% and an increased majority of 9,441. He was again re-elected at the 2019 general election, with a decreased vote share of 46% and a decreased majority of 3,781.

On 23 August 2021, Boris Johnson appointed Mundell as the UK's trade envoy to New Zealand. On 6 July 2022, he resigned from his position as Trade Envoy following the Chris Pincher scandal, amid the July 2022 United Kingdom government crisis.

Mundell was again re-elected at the 2024 general election, with a decreased vote share of 33.9% and an increased majority of 4,242.

== Personal life ==
On 13 January 2016, Mundell publicly came out as gay on his personal website, becoming the first openly gay Conservative cabinet minister.

Mundell was previously married to Lynda Jane Carmichael from 1987, and the couple divorced in 2012. He has three children, one of whom, Oliver Mundell, is the Conservative MSP for Dumfriesshire, having won his seat in the Scottish Parliament in May 2016.

Scottish Parliament
New constituency	Member of the Scottish Parliament for South of Scotland; 1999–2005	Succeeded by Derek Brownlee
Parliament of the United Kingdom
New constituency	Member of Parliament for Dumfriesshire, Clydesdale and Tweeddale; 2005–present	Incumbent
Political offices
Preceded by Eleanor Laing	Shadow Secretary of State for Scotland; 2005–2010	Succeeded by Jim Murphy
Preceded by Ann McKechin	Parliamentary Under-Secretary of State for Scotland; 2010–2015	Succeeded by The Lord Dunlop
Preceded by Alistair Carmichael	Secretary of State for Scotland; 2015–2019	Succeeded by Alister Jack
