= Keith Harding =

Scottish Conservative politician (1938–2021)

Member of the Scottish Parliament for Mid Scotland and Fife
- In office 6 May 1999 – 31 March 2003

Personal details
- Born: 21 November 1938 Chipping Norton, Oxfordshire, England
- Died: 15 November 2021 (aged 82) Redon, Ille-et-Vilaine, France
- Party: Scottish People's Alliance (2003–2010)
- Other political affiliations: Scottish Conservative (before 2003)

Keith Harding (21 November 1938 – 15 November 2021) was a Scottish politician who served as a Conservative Member of the Scottish Parliament (MSP) for Mid Scotland and Fife from 1999 to 2003.

== Background ==
Harding was leader of Stirling Council from 1991 to 1995. After being elected to Holyrood he was the Conservative spokesman on local government and housing.

Prior to the 2003 election he was moved from first to fifth place on the Conservative's list for Mid Scotland and Fife. After parliament was dissolved he defected to the newly formed Scottish People's Alliance. He subsequently fought Stirling for the SPA but came in a poor sixth place with only 642 votes (2.2%).

Harding was a member of the national policy committee of the New Party, the successor to the SPA.

Keith Harding died in Redon, Ille-et-Vilaine, France on 15 November 2021, at the age of 82.
