= Kate Maclean =

Scottish politician (born 1958)

Member of the Scottish Parliament for Dundee West
- In office 6 May 1999 – 2 April 2007
- Preceded by: New Parliament
- Succeeded by: Joe FitzPatrick

Personal details
- Born: 16 February 1958 (age 68) Dundee, Scotland
- Party: Scottish Labour Party

Kate Maclean (born 16 February 1958, Dundee) is a Scottish Labour Party politician. She was the Member of the Scottish Parliament (MSP) for the Dundee West constituency from 1999 to 2007.

Kate was educated at Craigie High School, Dundee and became a councillor in 1988. Prior to her election she had been leader of the Dundee City Council from 1992. Kate was also vice-president of Convention of Scottish Local Authorities (COSLA) between 1996 and 1999.

Although selected by Labour as a candidate for the 2007 Scottish Parliament election, Kate announced in June 2006 that she would instead not seek re-election. The Dundee West seat was taken by Joe FitzPatrick of the Scottish National Party at the 2007 election.

Scottish Parliament
New parliament Scotland Act 1998	Member of the Scottish Parliament for Dundee West; 1999–2007	Succeeded by Joe FitzPatrick
