= Jeremy Purvis =

British politician (born 1974)

The Right Honourable The Lord Purvis of Tweed
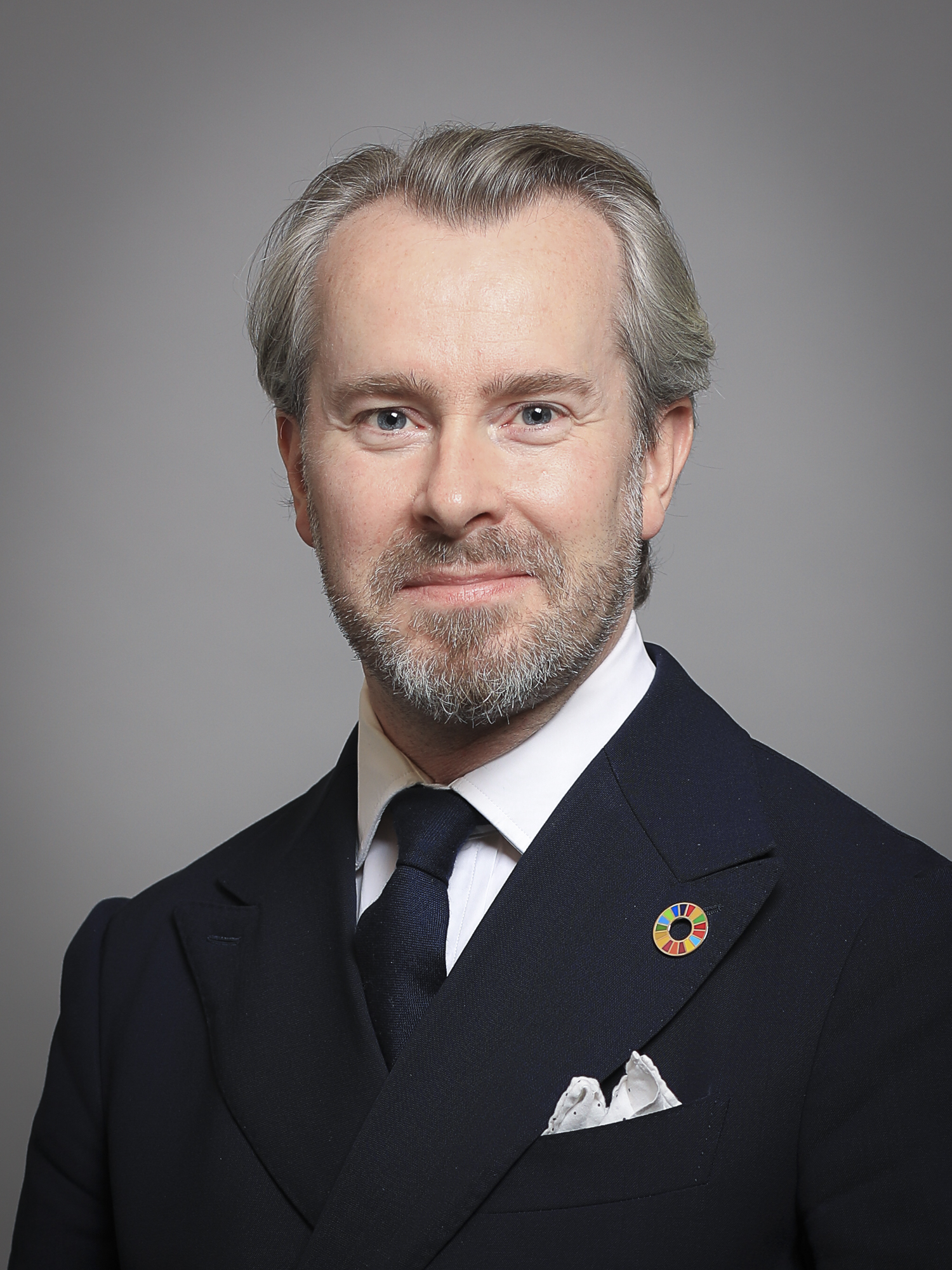
- Official portrait, 2020

Leader of the Liberal Democrats in the House of Lords
- Incumbent
- Assumed office 25 July 2025
- Leader: Ed Davey
- Preceded by: The Lord Newby

Member of the House of Lords
- Lord Temporal
- Life peerage 13 September 2013

Member of the Scottish Parliament for Tweeddale, Ettrick and Lauderdale
- In office 1 May 2003 – 22 March 2011
- Preceded by: Ian Jenkins
- Succeeded by: Constituency abolished

Personal details
- Born: 15 January 1974 (age 52) Berwick-upon-Tweed, England
- Party: Scottish Liberal Democrats

Jeremy Purvis, Baron Purvis of Tweed (born 15 January 1974) is a Scottish Liberal Democrat politician who has served as the Leader of the Liberal Democrats in the House of Lords since July 2025.

He was the Member of the Scottish Parliament (MSP) for Tweeddale, Ettrick and Lauderdale from 2003 to 2011.

In August 2013, he was elevated to the House of Lords.

== Background ==
He was born in Berwick-upon-Tweed, England, where he later attended school. He studied Politics and Modern History at Brunel University in London, graduating in 1996. While at university he worked for the ELDR (Liberal) Group in the European Parliament and Liberal International.

== Career ==
On graduating, Purvis worked full-time for Sir David Steel in the House of Commons and then ran his office in the House of Lords. In 1998 he moved to Edinburgh to work for a parliamentary affairs company and in 2001 he established, with a fellow director, his own strategic communications consultancy, advising clients on communications.

He was elected to the Scottish Parliament in 2003 aged 29, making him the youngest constituency MSP at the time. He was the Scottish Liberal Democrat Finance Spokesman and then subsequently Justice and Home Affairs spokesman. He was re-elected in 2007 following a close campaign against Scottish National Party candidate Christine Grahame. Ultimately, both parties increased their vote shares at the expense of the Conservatives and Labour. Purvis's margin of victory declined by 0.2 percentage points 2007 election. He lost his seat in the 2011 election to the Scottish National Party.

He was the Scottish Liberal Democrats Spokesman for the Economy and Finance. Mr Purvis wrote the Scottish Liberal Democrats 2011 Election Manifesto. He currently lives in Galashiels.

He was created a life peer on 13 September 2013 taking the title Baron Purvis of Tweed, of East March in the Scottish Borders.

In November 2016 he was announced as a member of the Commission on Parliamentary Reform, having been nominated to represent the Scottish Liberal Democrats.

In June 2025, Lord Purvis of Tweed tabled a motion of censure in the House of Commons against the ratification of the agreement for the restitution of the Chagos Islands, located in the British Indian Ocean Territory. The motion was withdrawn following debate and no vote was called.

In July 2025, he was elected as the Leader of the Liberal Democrat Group in the House of Lords.

Scottish Parliament
Preceded by Ian Jenkins	Member of the Scottish Parliament for Tweeddale, Ettrick and Lauderdale; 2003–2011	Constituency abolished
Party political offices
Preceded by The Lord Newby	Leader of the Liberal Democrats in the House of Lords; 2025–present	Incumbent
Orders of precedence in the United Kingdom
Preceded by The Lord Paddick	Gentlemen; Baron Purvis of Tweed	Followed by The Lord Holmes of Richmond
