= Christine Grahame =

Scottish National Party politician (born 1944)

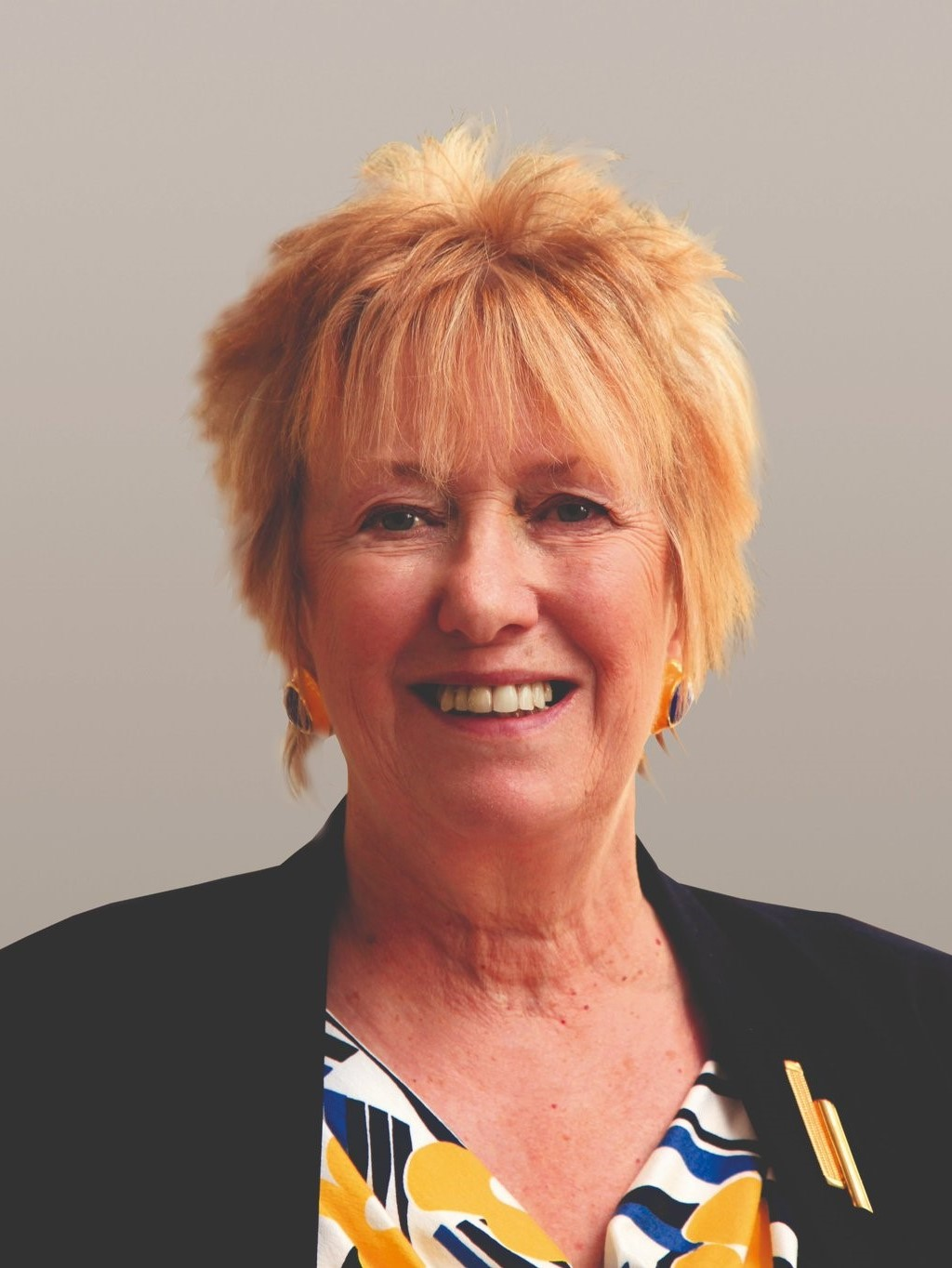
- Official portrait, 2021

Deputy Presiding Officer of the Scottish Parliament
- In office 12 May 2016 – 14 May 2021 Serving with Linda Fabiani and Lewis Macdonald
- Presiding Officer: Ken Macintosh
- Preceded by: John Scott and Elaine Smith
- Succeeded by: Liam McArthur

Convener of the Justice Committee
- In office 14 June 2011 – 23 March 2016
- Preceded by: John Lamont
- Succeeded by: Margaret Mitchell
- In office 6 September 2001 – 31 March 2003
- Preceded by: Alasdair Morgan
- Succeeded by: Pauline McNeill

Member of the Scottish Parliament for Midlothian South, Tweeddale and Lauderdale
- In office 6 May 2011 – 9 April 2026
- Preceded by: Jeremy Purvis
- Succeeded by: Calum Kerr

Member of the Scottish Parliament for South of Scotland (1 of 7 Regional MSPs)
- In office 6 May 1999 – 5 May 2011

Personal details
- Born: Christine Grahame; 9 September 1944 (age 82) Burton-on-Trent, Staffordshire, England
- Party: Scottish National Party
- Education: University of Edinburgh
- Occupation: Solicitor
- Website: www.christinegrahame.scot

Christine Grahame (formerly Creech; born 9 September 1944) is a Scottish politician who served as a Deputy Presiding Officer of the Scottish Parliament from 2016 to 2021. A member of the Scottish National Party (SNP), she was a Member of the Scottish Parliament (MSP) for the Midlothian South, Tweeddale and Lauderdale constituency from 2011 to 2026, having previously represented the South of Scotland region from 1999 to 2011.

Born in Staffordshire, England, and raised in Edinburgh, Scotland, she attended the University of Edinburgh and Moray House College of Education. After graduating, Grahame worked as an English teacher in secondary schools. In 1984, she graduated from the Edinburgh University again, but this time with a Bachelor of Laws degree. After gaining Diploma in Legal Practice she worked as a solicitor. Grahame was the SNP's candidate for Tweeddale, Ettrick and Lauderdale in the 1992 UK General election, but failed to win the seat. In 1999, she ran for equivalent constituency in the new Scottish Parliament. Although she was unsuccessful, she was elected as an additional member of the South of Scotland region.

Grahame ran for Depute Leader of the Scottish National Party in the 2004 leadership election, but was defeated by Nicola Sturgeon. In 2011, she was elected MSP for Midlothian South, Tweeddale and Lauderdale. Following the 2016 election to the 5th Scottish Parliament, Grahame was elected Deputy Presiding Officer. She held the position alongside Linda Fabiani from 2016 until 2021. She has served on the Scottish Parliamentary Corporate Body from May 2021 to 2026.

== Early life and education ==
Christine Grahame was born on 9 September 1944 in Burton-on-Trent, Staffordshire, England, to a Scottish father and English mother. Her maternal grandfather was Welsh. Grahame was brought up in Edinburgh, attending Boroughmuir High School.

She attained a Scottish Master of Arts degree from the University of Edinburgh in 1965 and gained her Diploma of Education from Moray House College of Education in 1966. After graduating, Grahame worked as a secondary teacher of English in a number of schools in Fife and Dumfries and Galloway.

After a period as a housewife, she returned to Edinburgh University as a mature student where she earned a Bachelor of Laws degree in 1984 and a Diploma in Legal Practice in 1985, subsequently practising as a solicitor at a number of law firms until her election as an MSP in 1999.

== Political career ==
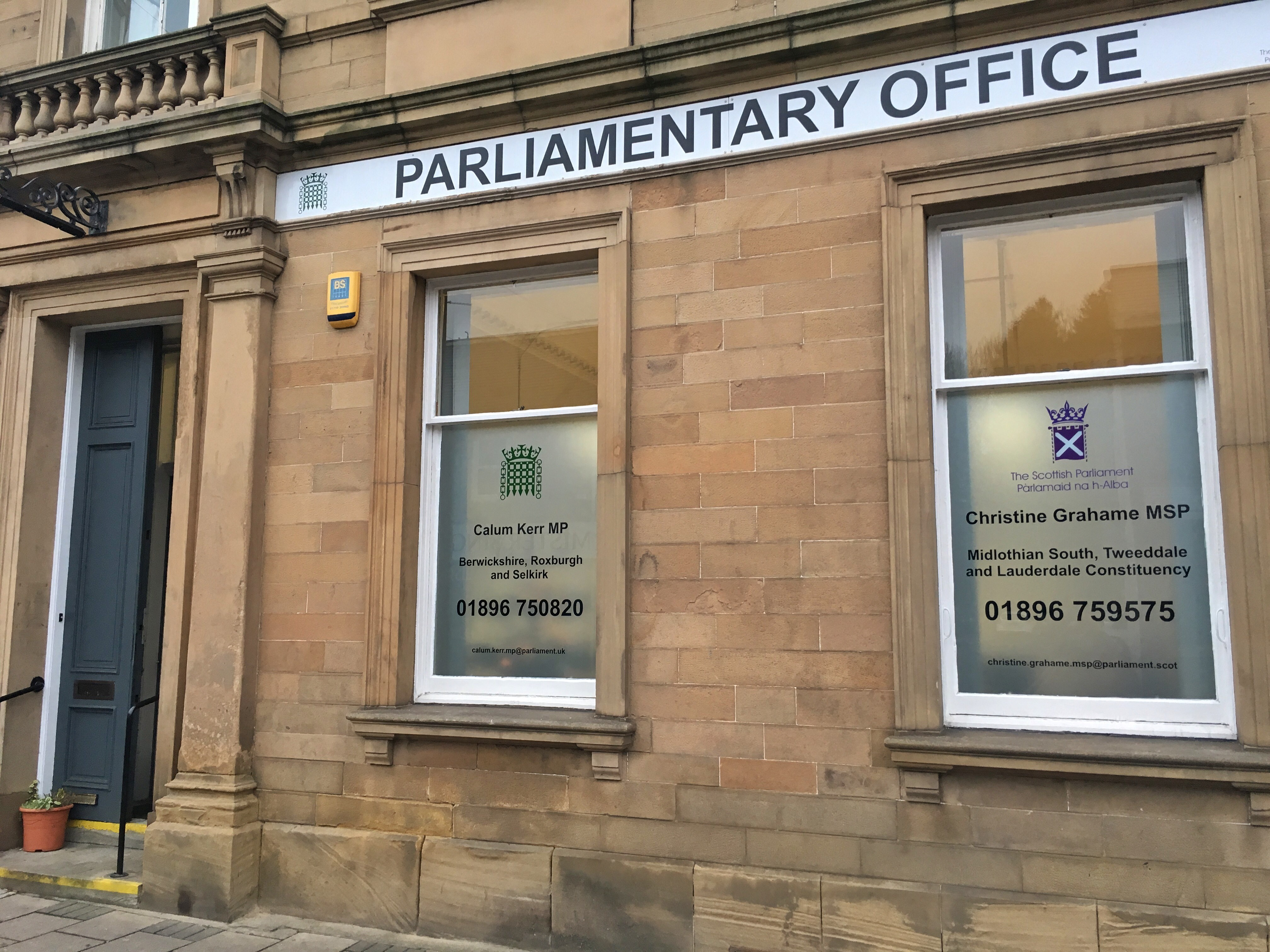
Christine Grahame's office in Galashiels

Grahame joined the Scottish National Party in 1970. Using her married name, Christine Creech, she was the SNP candidate at the 1992 General Election for Tweeddale, Ettrick and Lauderdale. In the 1994 European Parliament election, she contested the South of Scotland constituency, again unsuccessfully. At the 1999 Scottish Parliament election she ran for the Tweeddale, Ettrick and Lauderdale constituency.

=== Member of the Scottish Parliament ===
Although she finished second in the constituency vote, she was elected on the SNP's South of Scotland regional list. She later divorced and reverted to her maiden name. She contested Tweeddale, Ettrick and Lauderdale at the 2003 and 2007 elections, coming within 1,000 votes of victory on both occasions and being subsequently elected on the regional South of Scotland list. From 2001 to 2003, she was Convener of the Justice Committee.

In 2004, Grahame ran as a candidate for deputy leadership of the SNP after deputy leader Roseanna Cunningham entered the contest to replace leader John Swinney. She was defeated by Nicola Sturgeon. After the election, she was reshuffled from chair of the Scottish Parliament's Health committee to Shadow Minister for Social Justice, generally seen by media commentators as an upwards shift. In June 2005, she was elected Honorary President of the Federation of Student Nationalists.

In the 2011 Scottish Parliament election, Grahame won the redrawn seat of Midlothian South, Tweeddale and Lauderdale, defeating former Liberal Democrat finance spokesman Jeremy Purvis. Following her election, she was again selected as Convener of the Justice Committee for the session.

==== Deputy Presiding Officer ====
In the 2016 Scottish Parliament election, Grahame held the seat, increasing her share of the vote to 45.1%. Following the 2016 election, she was elected as Deputy Presiding Officer of the Scottish Parliament, serving alongside Linda Fabiani MSP. Grahame was also re-elected as Convener of the Cross Party Group on Animal Welfare. During the COVID-19 pandemic, she went into self isolation as someone over 70 years old and therefore at more risk of developing severe COVID-19 symptoms. In April 2020, Scottish Labour's Lewis Macdonald was elected as interim Deputy Presiding Officer in her absence.

==== Final session ====
In the 2021 Scottish Parliament election Grahame was re-elected as an MSP. She has served on the Scottish Parliamentary Corporate Body since May 2021. And in September 2024 she announced that she would stand down as an MSP at the 2026 Scottish Parliament election.

Grahame backed Kate Forbes in the 2023 SNP leadership election, following the resignation of Nicola Sturgeon.

In April 2024, Grahame abstained on the Government's Victims, Witnesses, and Justice Reform (Scotland) Bill at stage one due to concerns over a proposed pilot of juryless trials for rape cases that was contained in the legislation.

MSPs unanimously passed Grahame's Welfare of Dogs (Scotland) Bill in January 2025. This bill was introduced in June 2023 and was similar to a bill she had proposed in the previous parliamentary session (2016-2021) that fell due to lack of time. The Scottish Government have noted that the legislation "requires the Scottish Ministers to make a code setting out good practice in relation to acquiring a dog or transferring a dog to another person." After reading the code, the new owner would need to sign a (non-legally binding) certificate to say that they had considered the issues it sets out, while the seller would need to signal that they were happy for the dog to be sold to that individual.

== Causes ==
Since entering the Scottish Parliament in 1999 Grahame has picked up a number of causes, notably;

Borders Railway

For more information see: Borders Railway

One of Grahame's first actions as an MSP in 1999 was to set up a Cross Party Group to support the work of public petitions on the re-establishment of the Borders Railway which had been closed in 1969 during the controversial Beeching cuts. She continued to campaign for this for a number of years, with the line eventually opening between Edinburgh and Tweedbank in 2015.

Grahame has named her continued support of this as one of her biggest achievements and said on its opening:

"As someone who has campaigned for the return of the Waverley Line since 1999, it was an absolute privilege to be have finally traveled the length of the journey by rail, and to appreciate our wonderful countryside from a new perspective. So far this project has been an overwhelming success... If my experience is anything to go by, this will undoubtedly bring many, many visitors to Midlothian and the Borders as well as encouraging people to stay and live in the area."

In 2026, reflecting on her time in the Scottish Parliament, Grahame said that the Borders Railway was her "proudest achievement".

Great Tapestry of Scotland

In late 2015 Grahame became involved in a public dispute with Scottish Borders Council over the siting of the Great Tapestry of Scotland in the constituency. Councillors had approved a £6m purpose built visitor centre at Tweedbank Railway Station, however Grahame contested that the business case was flawed and persuaded Scottish Government ministers to investigate this further before releasing the funding required to create it. Grahame favoured siting the tapestry in a disused building in Galashiels arguing that that option had more potential to regenerate the area and encourage tourists to access transport links from Galashiels to the wider region.

In June 2016 one councillor resigned from the SNP over Grahame's intervention, claiming it represented a "lack of support" for SNP councillors and that he had not voted for her in the 2016 Scottish Parliament elections.

However, Grahame's position was eventually vindicated, with the council recommending Galashiels as the preferred site in December 2016 stating "Galashiels offers the greatest potential to provide a world class attraction which will make a significant contribution to the Borders economy."

Lockerbie Bombing

Grahame has been outspoken in her view that the conviction of Abdelbaset al-Megrahi of the 1988 Lockerbie bombing is unsafe and represents a miscarriage of justice. In May 2009, Grahame visited Megrahi, in Greenock jail. After her visit, she told the press: "I found it quite upsetting. The man is obviously very ill and he is desperate to see his family – absolutely desperate to see his family – so, whatever it takes, that's the priority. He did tell me things I can't discuss with you. But I am absolutely more convinced than ever that there has been a miscarriage of justice." A month later, Grahame arranged a second meeting with the prisoner, Megrahi.

A few days after the dropping of Megrahi's appeal against conviction and his release on compassionate grounds on 20 August 2009, Grahame wrote an op-ed article for The Independent saying she is convinced of his innocence: "He is not a saint, of course – he had a history with Libyan intelligence – but his hands are clean over Lockerbie."

in February 2025, Grahame led a Member's Business Debate on the Lockerbie bombing, praising (in her words) Dr Jim Swire's "painful but steady commitment to uncovering the facts behind the bombing of Pan Am Flight 103".

Republicanism

Grahame is a supporter of the political organisation Republic, a campaign to replace the British Monarchy with an elected head of state. In July 2009, Grahame snubbed Elizabeth II by checking her e-mails rather than attending the royal speech at Holyrood to mark the tenth anniversary of Scottish devolution. The move drew some criticism from commentators and fellow MSPs, however on the BBC Radio Good Morning Scotland programme, Grahame stated: "I'm earning and working for my constituents far more than if I sit hypocritically in the chamber watching a monarch for an institution I do not support."

== Personal life ==
Grahame has two sons. She has stated previously she has a harmless neurological tremor, which is hereditary and can cause visible shaking.

She is also well known for the variety of colourful brooches she wears in the Parliament.

Scottish Parliament
Preceded by Jeremy Purvis	Member of the Scottish Parliament for Midlothian South, Tweeddale and Lauderdale; 2011–2026	Incumbent
