= Tweeddale, Ettrick and Lauderdale (Scottish Parliament constituency) =

Scottish Parliament constituency

- Former county constituency for the Scottish Parliament
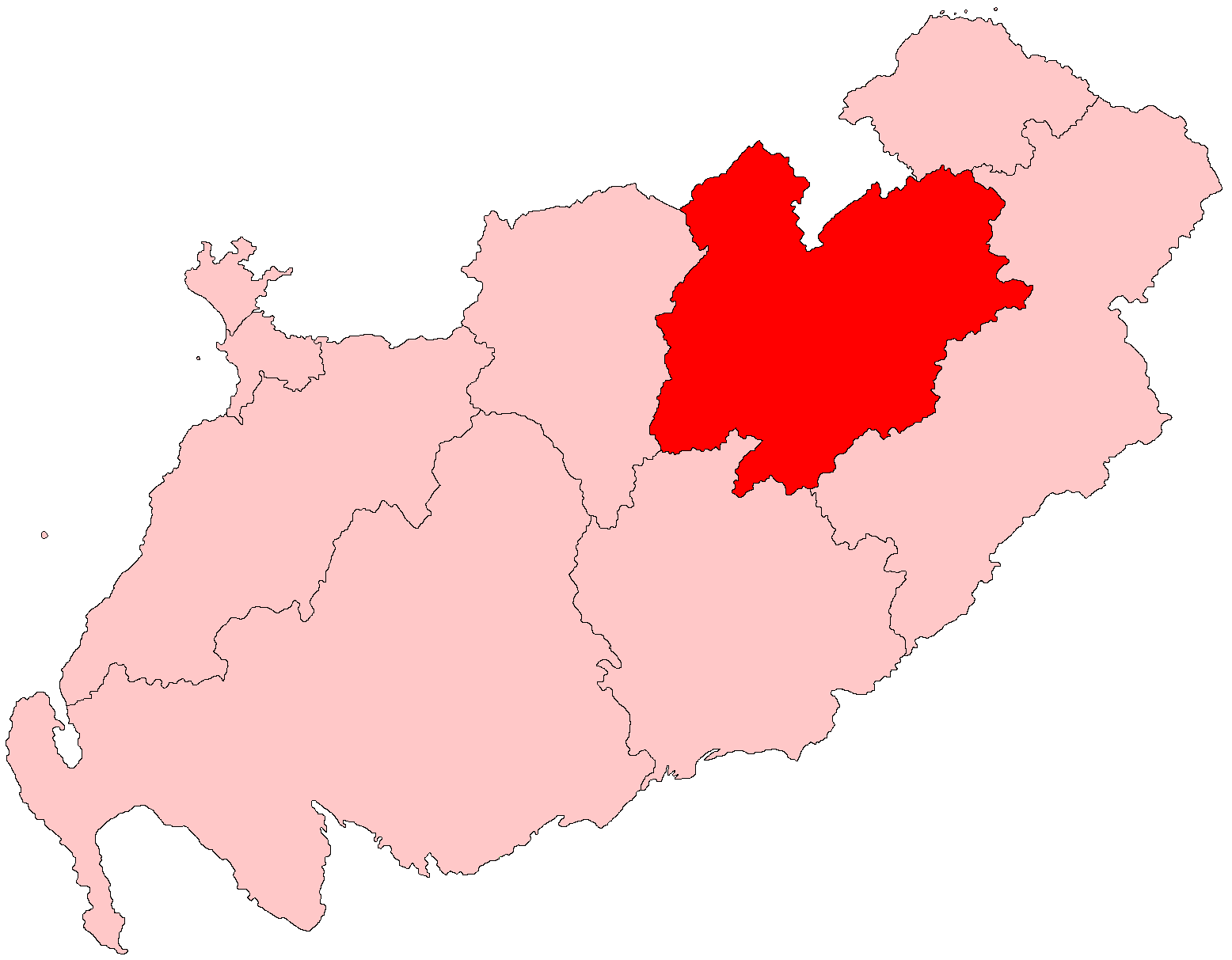

- Tweeddale, Ettrick and Lauderdale shown within the South of Scotland electoral region and the region shown within Scotland

Former constituency
- Created: 1999
- Abolished: 2011
- Council area: Scottish Borders (part); Midlothian (part)
- Replaced by: Ettrick, Roxburgh & Berwickshire, Midlothian North & Musselburgh, Midlothian South, Tweeddale & Lauderdale

Tweeddale, Ettrick and Lauderdale was a constituency of the Scottish Parliament (Holyrood). It elected one Member of the Scottish Parliament (MSP) by the plurality (first past the post) method of election. Also, however, it was one of nine constituencies in the South of Scotland electoral region, which elected seven additional members, in addition to nine constituency MSPs, to produce a form of proportional representation for the region as a whole.

For the 2011 Scottish Parliament election, the seat of Tweeddale, Ettrick and Lauderdale was re-established as Ettrick, Roxburgh and Berwickshire and Midlothian South, Tweeddale and Lauderdale.

== Electoral region ==
The other eight constituencies of the South of Scotland region were: Ayr, Carrick, Cumnock and Doon Valley, Clydesdale, Cunninghame South, Dumfries, East Lothian, Galloway and Upper Nithsdale and Roxburgh and Berwickshire.

The region covered the Dumfries and Galloway council area, the Scottish Borders council area, the South Ayrshire council area, part of the East Ayrshire council area, part of the East Lothian council area, part of the Midlothian council area, part of the North Ayrshire council area and part of the South Lanarkshire council area.

== Constituency boundaries and council areas ==
The Tweeddale, Ettrick and Lauderdale constituency was created at the same time as the Scottish Parliament, in 1999, with the name and boundaries of an existing Westminster constituency. In 2005, however, Scottish Westminster (House of Commons) constituencies were mostly replaced with new constituencies.

The Holyrood constituency covered a western portion of the Scottish Borders council area and a western portion of the Midlothian council area. The rest of the Scottish Borders area were covered by the Roxburgh and Berwickshire constituency. The rest of the Midlothian area was covered by the Midlothian constituency, which was in the Lothians electoral region.

== Boundary review ==
Following their First Periodic review into constituencies for the Scottish Parliament, the Boundary Commission for Scotland recommendated altering the Tweedale, Ettrick, and Lauderdale constituency into a newly formed Midlothian South, Tweedale and Lauderdale seat. The neighbouring constituency is an altered Ettrick, Roxburgh and Berwickshire seat.

== Members of the Scottish Parliament ==
Election	Member	Party
1999	Ian Jenkins	Scottish Liberal Democrats
2003	Jeremy Purvis	Scottish Liberal Democrats
2007	Jeremy Purvis	Scottish Liberal Democrats
2011	constituency abolished: replaced by Midlothian South, Tweeddale and Lauderdale	

== Election results ==
2007 Scottish Parliament election: Tweeddale, Ettrick and Lauderdale
Party	Candidate	Votes	%	±%
Liberal Democrats	Jeremy Purvis	10,656	35.1	+8.1
SNP	Christine Grahame	10,058	33.2	+8.3
Conservative	Derek Brownlee	5,594	18.4	−2.9
Labour	Catherine Maxwell Stuart	4,019	13.2	−8.4
Majority		598	1.9	−0.2
Turnout		30,327	56.3	+3.9
Liberal Democrats hold		Swing		

2003 Scottish Parliament election: Tweeddale, Ettrick and Lauderdale
Party	Candidate	Votes	%	±%
Liberal Democrats	Jeremy Purvis	7,197	26.96	−8.86
SNP	Christine Grahame	6,659	24.94	+2.40
Labour	Catherine Maxwell Stuart	5,757	21.56	−0.82
Conservative	Derek Brownlee	5,686	21.30	+2.05
Scottish Socialist	Norman Lockhart	1,055	3.95	+3.95
Majority		538	2.02	−11.26
Turnout		26,354	52.4	
Liberal Democrats hold		Swing		

1999 Scottish Parliament election: Tweeddale, Ettrick and Lauderdale
Party	Candidate	Votes	%	±%
Liberal Democrats	Ian Jenkins	12,078	35.82	N/A
SNP	Christine Creech	7,600	22.54	N/A
Labour	George McGregor	7,546	22.38	N/A
Conservative	John Campbell	6,491	19.25	N/A
Majority		4,478	13.28	N/A
Turnout		33,715		
Liberal Democrats win (new seat)				
