= Lothians (Scottish Parliament electoral region) =

- Former electoral region for the Scottish Parliament
- Lothians shown within Scotland

Former electoral region
- Created: 1999
- Abolished: 2011
- Council areas: City of Edinburgh; East Lothian (part); Midlothian (part); West Lothian
- Constituencies: Edinburgh Central; Edinburgh East and Musselburgh; Edinburgh Pentlands; Edinburgh South; Edinburgh West; Linlithgow; Livingston; Midlothian
- Replaced by: Lothian

The Lothians was one of the eight electoral regions of the Scottish Parliament (Holyrood) from 1999 to 2011. Nine of the parliament's 73 first past the post constituencies were sub-divisions of the region and it elected seven of the 56 additional-member Members of the Scottish Parliament (MSPs). Thus it elected a total of 16 MSPs.

The Lothians region shared boundaries with the South of Scotland and Central Scotland regions, and was connected with the Mid Scotland and Fife region by bridges over the Firth of Forth.

As a result of the First Periodic Review of Scottish Parliament Boundaries it is largely replaced by the Lothian region.

== Constituencies and council areas ==
The council areas City of Edinburgh and West Lothian were entirely within the region. Most of the East Lothian council area was outside, covered by the East Lothian constituency, which was in the South of Scotland region. A western portion of the Midlothian council area was covered by the Tweeddale, Ettrick and Lauderdale constituency, within the South of Scotland region.

Council areas are as defined in 1996, and may be subject to change after the next Scottish Parliament election.

The constituencies were created in 1999 with the names and boundaries of Westminster constituencies, as existing in at that time. Scottish Westminster constituencies were mostly replaced with new constituencies in 2005.

In terms of first past the post constituencies the region included:

Map	Constituency
	1. Edinburgh Central covers the central area of the City of Edinburgh.; 2. Edinburgh East and Musselburgh covers north east of the City of Edinburgh and the Musselburgh area of East Lothian.; 3. Edinburgh North and Leith covers the northern part of the City of Edinburgh.; 4. Edinburgh Pentlands covers the south western portion of the City of Edinburgh.; 5. Edinburgh South covers the south eastern portion of the City of Edinburgh.; 6. Edinburgh West covers the north western portion of the City of Edinburgh.; 7. Linlithgow covers the eastern part of the West Lothian.; 8. Livingston covers the western part of the West Lothian.; 9. Midlothian covers the eastern part of Midlothian.

== Members of the Scottish Parliament ==
The table below displays the Members of the Scottish Parliament that were elected from the Lothians region between 1999 and 2011. From the 2011 election the Lothian region was used.

=== Constituency MSPs ===
Term	Election	Midlothian	Edinburgh East and Musselburgh	Edinburgh Central	Edinburgh North and Leith	Edinburgh Pentlands	Edingburgh South	Edinburgh West	Linlithgow	Livingston
1st	1999	Rhona Brankin (Labour)	Susan Deacon (Labour)	Sarah Boyack (Labour)	Malcolm Chisholm (Labour)	Iain Gray (Labour)	Angus MacKay (Labour)	Margaret Smith (LD)	Mary Mulligan (Labour)	Bristow Muldoon (Labour)
2nd	2003	Rhona Brankin (Labour)	Susan Deacon (Labour)	Sarah Boyack (Labour)	Malcolm Chisholm (Labour)	David McLetchie (Conservative)	Mike Pringle (LD)	Margaret Smith (LD)	Mary Mulligan (Labour)	Bristow Muldoon (Labour)
3rd	2007	Rhona Brankin (Labour)	Kenny MacAskill (SNP)	Sarah Boyack (Labour)	Malcolm Chisholm (Labour)	David McLetchie (Conservative)	Mike Pringle (LD)	Margaret Smith (LD)	Mary Mulligan (Labour)	Angela Constance (SNP)

=== Regional List MSPs ===
N.B. This table is for presentation purposes only

Parliament	MSP	MSP	MSP	MSP	MSP	MSP	MSP
1st (1999–2003)	Margo MacDonald (SNP)	Fiona Hyslop (SNP)	Kenny MacAskill (SNP)	David Steel (Lib Dem)	James Douglas-Hamilton (Conservative)	David McLetchie (Conservative)	Robin Harper (Green)
2nd (2003–07)	Margo MacDonald (Ind)	Fiona Hyslop (SNP)	Kenny MacAskill (SNP)	Colin Fox (Socialist)	James Douglas-Hamilton (Conservative)	Mark Ballard (Green)	Robin Harper (Green)
3rd (2007–11)	Margo MacDonald (Ind)	Fiona Hyslop (SNP)	Ian McKee (SNP)	Stefan Tymkewycz (SNP)	Gavin Brown (Conservative)	George Foulkes (Labour)	Robin Harper (Green)
3rd (2007–11)	Margo MacDonald (Ind)	Fiona Hyslop (SNP)	Ian McKee (SNP)	Shirley-Anne Somerville (SNP)	Gavin Brown (Conservative)	George Foulkes (Labour)	Robin Harper (Green)

== Election results ==
=== 2007 Scottish Parliament election ===
In the 2007 Scottish Parliament election the region elected MSPs as follows:

- 5 Labour MSPs (four constituency members and one additional member)
- 5 Scottish National Party MSPs (two constituency members and three additional members)
- 2 Liberal Democrat MSPs (two constituency members)
- 2 Conservative MSPs (one constituency and one additional member)
- 1 Scottish Green Party MSPs (additional members)
- 1 Independent MSP (additional member)

==== Constituency results ====
2007 Scottish Parliament election: Lothians
Constituency	Elected member	Result
Edinburgh Central	Sarah Boyack	Labour hold
Edinburgh East and Musselburgh	Kenny MacAskill	SNP gain from Labour
Edinburgh North and Leith	Malcolm Chisholm	Labour hold
Edinburgh Pentlands	David McLetchie	Conservative hold
Edinburgh South	Mike Pringle	Liberal Democrats hold
Edinburgh West	Margaret Smith	Liberal Democrats hold
Linlithgow	Mary Mulligan	Labour hold
Livingston	Angela Constance	SNP gain from Labour
Midlothian	Rhona Brankin	Labour hold

==== Additional member results ====
2007 Scottish Parliament election: Lothians
Party	Elected candidates	Seats	+/−	Votes	%	+/−%
SNP	Fiona Hyslop; Ian McKee; Stefan Tymkewycz	3	+1	76,019	26.5	+10.2
Labour	George Foulkes	1	+1	75,495	26.3	+0.8
Conservative	Gavin Brown	1	±0	37,548	13.1	-2.0
Liberal Democrats		0	±0	36,571	12.7	+1.7
Green	Robin Harper	1	-1	20,147	7.0	-5.0
Independent	Margo MacDonald	1	±0	19,256	6.7	-3.5
Scottish Senior Citizens		0	±0	4,176	1.4	N/A
Solidarity		0	±0	2,998	1.0	N/A
BNP		0	±0	2,637	0.9	N/A
Socialist Labour		0	±0	2,190	0.8	-0.1
Scottish Christian		0	±0	2,002	0.7	N/A
Scottish Socialist		0	-1	1,994	0.7	-4.7
Publican Party		0	±0	1,230	0.4	N/A
Witchery Tour Party		0	±0	867	0.3	-0.1
CPA		0	±0	848	0.3	N/A
UKIP		0	±0	834	0.3	-0.1
Had Enough Party		0	±0	670	0.2	N/A
Scottish Voice		0	±0	661	0.2	N/A
Scotland Against Crooked Lawyers		0	±0	322	0.1	N/A
Independent		0	±0	189	0.1	N/A
Scottish Enterprise		0	±0	183	0.1	N/A
Independent		0	±0	129	0.0	N/A
Independent		0	±0	73	0.0	N/A

Changes:

- On 31 August 2007, Stefan Tymkewycz resigned to concentrate on being a councillor at the City of Edinburgh Council and was replaced by Shirley-Anne Somerville.

=== 2003 Scottish Parliament election ===
In the 2003 Scottish Parliament election the region elected MSPs as follows:

- 6 Labour MSPs (all constituency members)
- 2 Liberal Democrat MSPs (two constituency members)
- 2 Conservative MSPs (one constituency and one additional member)
- 2 Scottish Green Party MSPs (both additional members)
- 2 Scottish National Party MSPs (both additional members)
- 1 Independent MSP (additional member)
- 1 Scottish Socialist Party MSP (additional member)

==== Constituency results ====
2003 Scottish Parliament election: Lothians
Constituency	Elected member	Result
Edinburgh Central	Sarah Boyack	Labour hold
Edinburgh East and Musselburgh	Susan Deacon	Labour hold
Edinburgh North and Leith	Malcolm Chisholm	Labour hold
Edinburgh Pentlands	David McLetchie	Conservative gain from Labour
Edinburgh South	Mike Pringle	Liberal Democrats gain from Labour
Edinburgh West	Margaret Smith	Liberal Democrats hold
Linlithgow	Mary Mulligan	Labour hold
Livingston	Bristow Muldoon	Labour hold
Midlothian	Rhona Brankin	Labour hold

==== Additional member results ====
2003 Scottish Parliament election: Lothians
Party	Elected candidates	Seats	+/−	Votes	%	+/−%
Labour		0	0	65,098	24.5	-5.7
SNP	Kenny MacAskill; Fiona Hyslop	2	−1	43,142	16.2	-9.5
Conservative	James Douglas-Hamilton	1	−1	40,173	15.1	-0.6
Green	Robin Harper; Mark Ballard	2	+1	31,908	12.0	+5.1
Liberal Democrats		0	−1	29,237	11.0	-3.4
Independent	Margo MacDonald	1	+1	27,143	10.2	N/A
Scottish Socialist	Colin Fox	1	+1	14,448	5.4	+3.8
Scottish Pensioners Party		0	0	5,609	2.1	N/A
Liberal		0	0	2,573	1.0	+0.4
Socialist Labour		0	0	2,181	0.8	-2.5
UKIP		0	0	1,057	0.4	N/A
Witchery Tour Party		0	0	964	0.4	–
Scottish People's		0	0	879	0.3	N/A
ProLife Alliance		0	0	608	0.2	N/A
Independent		0	0	383	0.1	N/A
Independent		0	0	184	0.1	N/A
Independent		0	0	78	0.0	N/A

=== 1999 Scottish Parliament election ===
In the 1999 Scottish Parliament election the region elected MSPs as follows:

- 8 Labour MSPs (all constituency members)
- 3 Scottish National Party MSPs (all additional members)
- 2 Liberal Democrat MSPs (one constituency member and one additional member)
- 2 Conservative MSPs (both additional members)
- 1 Green Party MSP (additional member)

==== Constituency results ====
1999 Scottish Parliament election: Lothians
Constituency	Elected member	Result
Edinburgh Central	Sarah Boyack	Scottish Labour Party win (new seat)
Edinburgh East and Musselburgh	Susan Deacon	Scottish Labour Party win (new seat)
Edinburgh North and Leith	Malcolm Chisholm	Scottish Labour Party win (new seat)
Edinburgh Pentlands	Iain Gray	Scottish Labour Party win (new seat)
Edinburgh South	Angus Mackay	Scottish Labour Party win (new seat)
Edinburgh West	Margaret Smith	Scottish Liberal Democrats win (new seat)
Linlithgow	Mary Mulligan	Scottish Labour Party win (new seat)
Livingston	Bristow Muldoon	Scottish Labour Party win (new seat)
Midlothian	Rhona Brankin	Scottish Labour Party win (new seat)

==== Additional member results ====
1999 Scottish Parliament election: Lothians
Party	Elected candidates	Seats	+/−	Votes	%	+/−%
Labour		0	N/A	99,098	30.2	N/A
SNP	Margo MacDonald; Kenny MacAskill; Fiona Hyslop	3	N/A	85,085	25.7	N/A
Conservative	David McLetchie; James Douglas-Hamilton	2	N/A	52,067	15.7	N/A
Liberal Democrats	David Steel	1	N/A	47,565	14.4	N/A
Green	Robin Harper	1	N/A	22,848	6.9	N/A
Socialist Labour		0	N/A	10,895	3.3	N/A
Scottish Socialist		0	N/A	5,237	1.6	N/A
Liberal		0	N/A	2,056	0.6	N/A
Witchery Tour Party		0	N/A	1,184	0.4	N/A
ProLife Alliance		0	N/A	898	0.3	N/A
Civil Rights Movement		0	N/A	806	0.2	N/A
Natural Law		0	N/A	564	0.2	N/A
Independent		0	N/A	557	0.2	N/A
Socialist (GB)		0	N/A	388	0.1	N/A
Independent		0	N/A	256	0.1	N/A
Independent		0	N/A	145	0.04	N/A
Independent		0	N/A	54	0.02	N/A
