= Midlothian (Scottish Parliament constituency) =

Scottish Parliament constituency

- Former county constituency for the Scottish Parliament
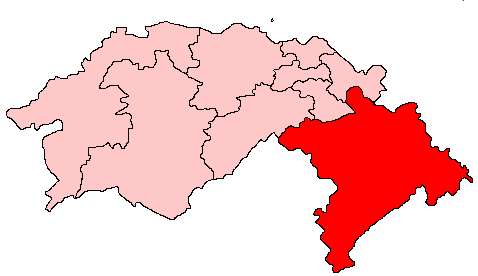

- Midlothian shown within the Lothians electoral region and the region shown within Scotland

Former constituency
- Created: 1999
- Abolished: 2011
- Council area: Midlothian
- Replaced by: Midlothian North & Musselburgh, Midlothian South, Tweeddale & Lauderdale

Midlothian was a constituency of the Scottish Parliament (Holyrood). It elected one Member of the Scottish Parliament (MSP) by the plurality (first past the post) method of election. Also, however, it was one of nine constituencies in the Lothians electoral region, which elected seven additional members, in addition to nine constituency MSPs, to produce a form of proportional representation for the region as a whole.

For the 2011 Scottish Parliament election, the Midlothian constituency was abolished, with the creation of two new constituencies called Midlothian North and Musselburgh, and Midlothian South, Tweeddale and Lauderdale.

== Electoral region ==
The other eight constituencies of the Lothians region from 1999 to 2011 were: Edinburgh Central, Edinburgh East and Musselburgh, Edinburgh North and Leith, Edinburgh Pentlands, Edinburgh South, Edinburgh West, Linlithgow and Livingston.

The region covered the City of Edinburgh council area, the West Lothian council area, part of the Midlothian council area, and part of the East Lothian council area.

== Constituency boundaries and council area ==
The Midlothian constituency was created at the same time as the Scottish Parliament, in 1999, with the name and boundaries of the then existing Westminster constituency. In 2005, however, Scottish Westminster (House of Commons) constituencies were mostly replaced with new constituencies.

The Holyrood constituency was one of two covering the Midlothian council area. The other constituency, Tweeddale, Ettrick and Lauderdale, covered a western portion of the Midlothian council area, and straddles its boundary with the Scottish Borders council area. Tweeddale, Ettrick and Lauderdale was within the South of Scotland electoral region.

== Boundary review ==
Following their First Periodic review of constituencies to the Scottish Parliament, the Boundary Commission for Scotland recommended extending the current Midlothian constituency into a newly formed seat of Midlothian North and Musselburgh with the western boundary to the south of Auchendinny. The other constituency now covering the Midlothian council area is a modified Midlothian South, Tweedale, and Lauderdale constituency.

== Member of the Scottish Parliament ==
Election	Member	Party
1999	Rhona Brankin	Scottish Labour Party
2011	constituency abolished: replaced by Midlothian North and Musselburgh	

== Election results ==
2007 Scottish Parliament election: Midlothian
Party	Candidate	Votes	%	±%
Labour	Rhona Brankin	10,671	42.5	−4.8
SNP	Colin Beattie	8,969	35.7	+11.9
Liberal Democrats	Ross Laird	2,704	10.8	−0.7
Conservative	P J Lewis	2,269	9.0	−1.8
Had Enough Party	George McCleery	498	2.0	New
Majority		1,702	6.8	−16.7
Turnout		25,111	51.6	+2.9
Labour hold		Swing		

2003 Scottish Parliament election: Midlothian
Party	Candidate	Votes	%	±%
Labour	Rhona Brankin	11,139	47.29	−1.33
SNP	Graham Sutherland	5,597	23.76	−6.29
Liberal Democrats	Jacqui Bell	2,700	11.46	+0.76
Conservative	Rosemary Macarthur	2,557	10.85	+2.30
Scottish Socialist	Bob Goupillot	1,563	6.64	+6.64
Majority		5,542	23.53	+4.96
Turnout		23,556	48.75	−12.76
Labour hold		Swing	+8.4	

1999 Scottish Parliament election: Midlothian
Party	Candidate	Votes	%	±%
Labour	Rhona Brankin	14,467	48.62	N/A
SNP	Angus Robertson	8,942	30.05	N/A
Liberal Democrats	John Elder	3,184	10.70	N/A
Conservative	George Turnbull	2,544	8.55	N/A
Independent	Douglas Pryde	618	2.08	N/A
Majority		5,525	18.57	N/A
Turnout		29,755	61.49	N/A
Labour win (new seat)				
