= 2011 Scottish Parliament election =

- 5 May 2011

All 129 seats to the Scottish Parliament 65 seats needed for a majority
- Opinion polls
- Registered: 3,950,626
- Turnout: Constituency - 50.5% ▼3.4pp Regional - 50.5% ▼3.5pp
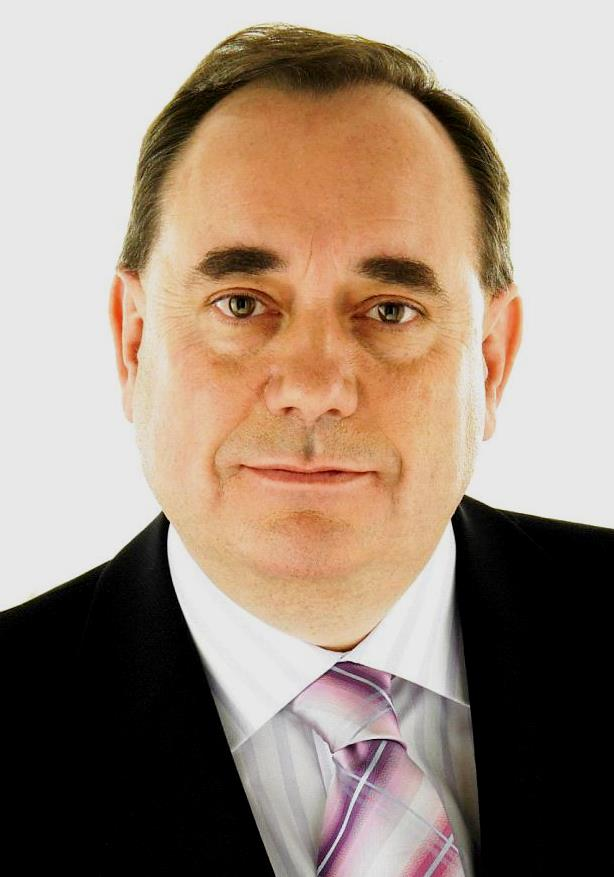

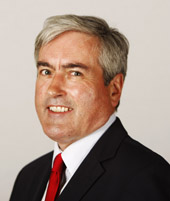

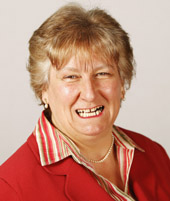

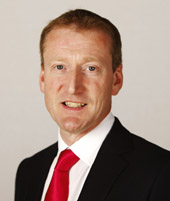

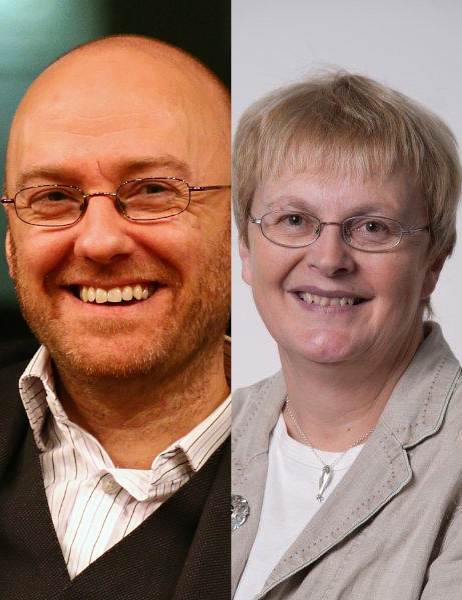

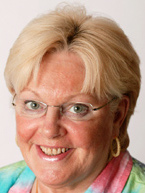
	First party	Second party	Third party
Leader	Alex Salmond	Iain Gray	Annabel Goldie
Party	SNP	Labour	Conservative
Leader since	3 September 2004	13 September 2008	8 November 2005
Leader's seat	Aberdeenshire East (Note: Represented Gordon prior to dissolution. Aberdeenshire East was one of two successors seat under new constituency boundaries.)	East Lothian	West Scotland (Note: Represented West of Scotland region prior to dissolution. West Scotland was the direct successor region under new boundaries.)
Last election	47 seats	46 (Note: Includes 14 MSPs sponsored by the Co-operative Party, who are designated Labour and Co-operative.) seats	17 seats
Seats before	46	44	17
Seats won	69	37 (Note: Includes 11 MSPs sponsored by the Co-operative Party, who are designated Labour and Co-operative.)	15
Seat change	▲23*	▼7*	▼2*
Constituency vote	902,915	630,461	276,652
% and swing	45.4% ▲12.5%	31.7% ▼0.5%	13.9% ▼2.7%
Regional vote	876,421	523,469	245,967
% and swing	44.0% ▲13.0%	26.3% ▼2.9%	12.4% ▼1.5%
	Fourth party	Fifth party	Sixth party
Leader	Tavish Scott	Patrick Harvie / Eleanor Scott	Margo MacDonald
Party	Liberal Democrats	Green	Independent
Leader since	26 August 2008	22 September 2008	28 January 2003
Leader's seat	Shetland	Glasgow / Ran in Highlands and Islands (lost)	Lothian (Note: Represented Lothians region prior to dissolution. Lothian was the direct successor region under new boundaries.)
Last election	16 seats	2 seats	1 seat
Seats before	17	1	1
Seats won	5	2	1
Seat change	▼12*	▲1*	*
Constituency vote	157,714	Did not contest	Did not contest
% and swing	7.9% ▼8.2%	Did not contest	Did not contest
Regional vote	103,472	86,939	18,732
% and swing	5.2% ▼6.1%	4.4% ▲0.3%	0.9%
- The map shows the election results in single-member constituencies. The additional member MSPs in the 8 regions are shown around the map. * Indicates boundary change - so this is a nominal figure
First Minister before election
Alex Salmond
SNP
First Minister after election
Alex Salmond
SNP

An election for the Scottish Parliament was held on Thursday, 5 May 2011 to elect 129 members to the Scottish Parliament.

The election delivered the first majority government since the opening of Holyrood, a remarkable feat as the additional-member system used to elect MSPs was allegedly originally implemented to prevent any party achieving an overall parliamentary majority. The Scottish National Party (SNP) won a landslide of 69 seats, the most the party has ever held at either a Holyrood or Westminster election, allowing leader Alex Salmond to remain as First Minister of Scotland for a second term. The SNP gained 32 constituencies, twenty two from Scottish Labour, nine from the Scottish Liberal Democrats and one from the Scottish Conservatives. Such was the scale of their gains that, of the 73 constituencies in Scotland, only 20 came to be represented by MSPs of other political parties. Scottish Labour lost seven seats and suffered their worst election defeat in Scotland since 1931, with huge losses in their traditional Central Belt constituencies and for the first time having to rely on the regional lists to elect members within these areas. They did, however, remain the largest opposition party. Party leader Iain Gray announced his resignation following his party's disappointing result. The Scottish Liberal Democrats were soundly defeated; their popular vote share was cut in half and their seat total reduced from 16 to 5. Tavish Scott announced his resignation as party leader shortly after the election. For Scottish Conservatives, the election proved disappointing as their popular vote dropped slightly and their number of seats fell by 2, with party leader Annabel Goldie also announcing her resignation.

During the campaign, the four main party leaders engaged in a series of televised debates, as they had in every previous general election. These key debates were held on 29 March (STV), 1 May (BBC), and 3 May (STV). The results of the election were broadcast live on BBC Scotland and STV, on the night of the election.

It was the fourth general election since the devolved parliament was established in 1999 and was held on the same day as elections to the National Assembly for Wales and the Northern Ireland Assembly, as well as English local elections and the UK-wide referendum on the alternative vote.

== Date ==
Under the Scotland Act 1998, an ordinary general election to the Scottish Parliament was held on the first Thursday in May four years after the 2007 election.

Because of the problems of voter confusion and a high number of spoilt ballots in 2007 due to holding Scottish parliamentary and local elections simultaneously and under different voting systems, the next Scottish local elections were held in 2012 instead of 2011. This policy decision was contradicted, however, by the staging of the Alternative Vote referendum on 5 May 2011 as well. Labour MP Ian Davidson expressed opposition to the referendum being staged on the same date as other elections. Scottish Secretary Michael Moore stated that having the referendum on another date would cost an additional £17 million.

British, Irish, Commonwealth and European Union citizens living in Scotland who were aged 18 or over on election day were entitled to vote. The deadline to register to vote in the election was midnight on Friday 15 April 2011, though anyone who qualified as an anonymous elector had until midnight on Tuesday 26 April 2011 to register.

It was held on the same day as elections for Northern Ireland's 26 local councils, the Northern Irish Assembly and Welsh Assembly elections, a number of local elections in England and the United Kingdom Alternative Vote referendum.

== Boundary Review ==
The notional results of the 2007 election, based on the new boundaries

The table below shows the notional figures for seats won by each party at the last election. The Conservatives have been the biggest gainers as a result of the boundary changes, winning an extra three seats, while Labour has lost the most seats, losing two overall.

Party	Constituency seats	Regional seats	Total seats	Seat change
SNP	21	25	46	–1
Labour	35	9	44	–2
Conservative	6	14	20	+3
Liberal Democrat	11	6	17	+1
Scottish Green	0	1	1	–1

== Election system, seats, and regions ==
The total number of Members of the Scottish Parliament (MSPs) elected to the Parliament is 129.

The First Periodical Review of the Scottish Parliament constituencies and electoral regions by the Boundary Commission for Scotland was announced on 3 July 2007. The Commission published its provisional proposals for the regional boundaries in 2009.

The Scottish Parliament uses an Additional Members System, designed to produce approximate proportional representation for each region. There are 8 regions each sub-divided into smaller constituencies. There are a total of 73 constituencies. Each constituency elects one (MSP) by the plurality (first past the post) system of election. Each region elects seven additional member MSPs using an additional member system. A modified D'Hondt method, using the constituency results, is used to calculate which additional member MSPs the regions elect.

The Scottish Parliament constituencies have not been coterminous with Scottish Westminster constituencies since the 2005 general election, when the 72 former Westminster constituencies were replaced with a new set of 59, generally larger, constituencies (see Scottish Parliament (Constituencies) Act 2004).

For details of the Revised proposals for constituencies at the Next Scottish Parliament election - Scottish Parliament constituencies and electoral regions from 2011

The Boundary Commission have also recommended changes to the electoral regions used to elect "list" members of the Scottish Parliament. The recommendations can be summarised below;

- Glasgow was reduced from 10 constituency seats to 9. Glasgow Govan was largely replaced by Glasgow Southside. The seats of Glasgow Maryhill, Glasgow Springburn and Glasgow Baillieston were abolished and their territory was divided between the newly created Glasgow Maryhill and Springburn and Glasgow Provan, as well as the existing Glasgow Shettleston seat which was moved eastwards.
- Highlands and Islands retained 8 constituency seats. Caithness, Sutherland and Easter Ross was replaced with the larger Caithness, Sutherland and Ross seat. Ross, Skye and Inverness West and Inverness East, Nairn and Lochaber were abolished with most of their area being divided between Skye, Lochaber and Badenoch and Inverness and Nairn.
- West of Scotland was renamed West Scotland. It was increased from 9 constituency seats to 10, as Cunninghame South was transferred from the South Scotland region. The seats of Paisley North, Paisley South and West Renfrewshire were abolished and their area was divided between the new seats of Paisley, Renfrewshire North and West and Renfrewshire South
- Central Scotland was reduced from 10 constituency seats to 9, as the territory of Kilmarnock and Loudoun was transferred to South Scotland. Some territory to the south was also transferred to South Scotland, reducing the land area of East Kilbride. Hamilton North and Bellshill was largely replaced by Uddingston and Bellshill. Hamilton South was largely replaced by Hamilton, Larkhall and Stonehouse.
- Lothians was renamed Lothian and retained 9 constituency seats. The seat of Midlothian was split, with its southern areas transferred to South Scotland. Its northern parts merged with Musselburgh to form Midlothian North and Musselburgh. Edinburgh East and Musselburgh, thus with Musselburgh removed, was replaced by Edinburgh Eastern. The seats of Edinburgh North and Leith, Edinburgh South and Edinburgh West were respectively renamed Edinburgh Northern and Leith, Edinburgh Southern and Edinburgh Western while redrawn. In West Lothian, Livingston was replaced by Almond Valley, which traded territory with the retained Linlithgow seat.
- Mid Scotland and Fife retained 9 constituencies. North Tayside was mostly replaced by Perthshire North, with some of the former's territory being transferred to North East Scotland. Ochil was split, with its eastern parts merging with the former seat of Perth to form Perthshire South and Kinross-shire. Clackmannanshire and Dunblane was created, consisting mostly of the more populous western part of Ochil. In Fife, Dunfermline West, Dunfermline East and Fife Central were respectively largely replaced by Dunfermline, Cowdenbeath and Mid Fife and Glenrothes.
- North East Scotland was increased from 9 to 10 constituency seats. The seat of Angus was split between two new seats: Angus South, which included territory transferred from Mid Scotland and Fife, and Angus North and Mearns. Both West Aberdeenshire and Kincardine and Gordon were split. The former was divided between the new seat of Aberdeenshire West, Angus North and Mearns and an enlarged Aberdeen South, which under new boundaries was named Aberdeen South and North Kincardine. A redrawn Aberdeen North was renamed Aberdeen Donside. Gordon was split between Aberdeenshire West and another new seat: Aberdeenshire East. Some territory was also traded with Banff and Buchan, which was largely replaced by Banffshire and Buchan Coast. The two Dundee seats were redrawn and renamed from Dundee West and Dundee East to Dundee City West and Dundee City East.
- South of Scotland was renamed South Scotland. It retained 9 constituencies, losing Cunninghame South to West Scotland but gaining the new Kilmarnock and Irvine Valley constituency, which replaced the previous constituency of Kilmarnock and Loudoun. Some territory was transferred from Galloway and Upper Nithsdale to Dumfries; the redrawn seats were then renamed Galloway and West Dumfries and Dumfriesshire. Tweeddale, Ettrick and Lauderdale lost territory to Roxburgh and Berwickshire but gained some from the Lothian area to the north. These seats were redrawn and renamed Midlothian South, Tweeddale and Lauderdale and Ettrick, Roxburgh and Berwickshire.

== Retiring MSPs ==
At the dissolution of Parliament on 22 March 2011, twenty MSPs were not seeking re-election.

Constituency/Region	Departing MSP	Party
Mid Scotland and Fife	Christopher Harvie	SNP
Argyll and Bute	Jim Mather	SNP
Lothians	Ian McKee	SNP
South of Scotland	Alasdair Morgan	SNP
Angus	Andrew Welsh	SNP
Paisley North	Wendy Alexander	Scottish Labour
Midlothian	Rhona Brankin	Scottish Labour
Glasgow Baillieston	Margaret Curran	Scottish Labour
Lothians	George Foulkes	Scottish Labour
North East Scotland	Marlyn Glen	Scottish Labour
West Renfrewshire	Trish Godman	Scottish Labour
Carrick, Cumnock and Doon Valley	Cathy Jamieson	Scottish Labour
Motherwell and Wishaw	Jack McConnell	Scottish Labour
Highlands and Islands	Peter Peacock	Scottish Labour
Ross, Skye and Inverness West	John Farquhar Munro	Liberal Democrats
Aberdeen South	Nicol Stephen	Liberal Democrats
Caithness, Sutherland and Easter Ross	Jamie Stone	Liberal Democrats
Glasgow	Bill Aitken	Conservative
Mid Scotland and Fife	Ted Brocklebank	Conservative
Lothians	Robin Harper	Green

== Campaign ==
The parliament was dissolved on 22 March 2011 and the campaign began thereafter. The Conservatives saw 3 of their candidates drop out of the election during the period 25–28 March: Malcolm McAskill from the Glasgow regional ballot, Iain Whyte from the Glasgow Maryhill & Springburn constituency ballot and David Meikle from the Glasgow regional ballot.

The Liberal Democrat regional candidate for the Central Scotland region Hugh O'Donnell also withdrew on 27 March, citing discontent with the Conservative-Lib Dem coalition at Westminster. Another Liberal Democrat, John Farquhar Munro, came out in support of Alex Salmond for First Minister, even though he also claimed not to support the SNP. In the Clydesdale constituency, the Liberal Democrat candidate John Paton-Day failed to lodge his papers in time for the nomination deadline, leaving the constituency as the only one in Scotland with no Liberal Democrat candidate. On 17 April, the Scottish Liberal Democrat leader Tavish Scott described himself as 'uncomfortable' with his Scottish party being 'related' to the Conservatives due to the coalition at Westminster.

A televised debate between the four main party leaders was shown on STV on 29 March, with SNP leader Alex Salmond and Conservative leader Annabel Goldie identified as the strongest performers. The Scottish Sun newspaper came out in support of the SNP's campaign to win a second term, even though the newspaper does not back independence.

Whilst campaigning in Glasgow Central station, the Scottish Labour leader Iain Gray was ambushed by a group of anti-cuts protestors who chased him into a nearby fast-food outlet. The same protesters had already targeted Conservative leader Annabel Goldie a month earlier. On 27 April, Iain Gray and SNP leader Alex Salmond were both present simultaneously in an Ardrossan branch of the Asda supermarket chain; both parties alleged that the other party's leader 'ran away' from the possibility of an encounter with the other.

== Policy platforms ==
The main parties contesting the election all outlined the following main aims:

=== Scottish National Party ===
- Legislate to give Scotland a referendum on independence.
- Maintain the council tax freeze throughout the next parliament.
- Attempt to generate 100% of Scotland's electricity from renewable sources by 2020.
- Continue offering free university tuition to Scottish students.
- Maintain high police numbers.

=== Labour ===
- Introduce Scottish Living Wage of £7.15 an hour, starting in the public sector.
- Abolish youth unemployment and aim to create 250,000 jobs by 2020.
- Compulsory six-month jail sentences for people convicted of knife-carrying.
- Initiate two-year council tax freeze.
- Re-instate the proposed rail link between Glasgow Central station and Glasgow International Airport, which was cancelled in 2009.
- Continue free University tuition fees for all Scottish students.

=== Conservatives ===
- A council tax freeze during the period 2012–2013.
- Re-introduce prescription charges (which had been abolished earlier that year) at the 2009 rate of £5 for a single item and £48 for a prepayment certificate.
- Consider building new nuclear power stations, but not on new sites.
- Bring in Variable University Graduate Fee, with no more than £4,000 being paid annually per student.
- Replace community service with short prison sentences.
- Centralising the Scottish police forces into a single police force.

=== Liberal Democrats ===
- Maintain free university tuition for Scottish students.
- Aim to create 100,000 new jobs through selling off Scottish Water which would free £1.5 billion for investment purposes.
- Oppose moves to create a centralised Scottish police force.
- Maintain the Scottish bus pass, but progressively bring the qualifying age up to 65.
- Reform the council tax.

=== Greens ===
- Bring in large-scale ecosystem restoration projects.
- Replace council tax with land value tax.
- Maintain free university tuition for Scottish students.
- Focus on bringing restorative justice within Scotland's justice system.
- Abolish the Forth Replacement Crossing.

== Parties contesting the election ==
=== Contesting constituency and regional ballot ===
Only the Scottish National Party, the Scottish Labour Party and the Scottish Conservative Party contested all constituencies.

- Scottish National Party (SNP)
- Scottish Labour
- Scottish Conservatives
- Scottish Liberal Democrats – Contesting all constituencies except Clydesdale
- All Scotland Pensioner's Party/Scottish Senior Citizens Unity Party – Contesting Mid Fife & Glenrothes and Motherwell & Wishaw
- Scottish Christian Party – Contesting Inverness & Nairn and Motherwell & Wishaw
- Liberal Party – Contesting Argyll & Bute
- National Front – Contesting Aberdeen Central, Aberdeen Donside, Aberdeen South & North Kincardine, Almond Valley, Linlithgow and only the North East Scotland region
- UK Independence Party (UKIP) – Contesting Inverness & Nairn, Moray and North East Fife

=== Contesting regional ballot only ===
- Scottish Greens
- Solidarity – all regions except Glasgow
- Respect Party 'Coalition Against Cuts' – Glasgow only
- Scottish Socialist Party
- British National Party (BNP)
- Socialist Labour Party
- Scottish Homeland Party – contesting Glasgow and Central regions
- Pirate Party
- Scottish Unionist Party
- Christian Peoples Alliance
- Ban Bankers Bonuses – contesting the Highlands and Islands and West of Scotland regional lists.

=== Contesting constituency ballot only ===
- Communist Party of Britain – Contesting Glasgow Anniesland
- Land Party – Contesting Cowdenbeath

== Opinion polls ==
In March 2011, two months before the election, Labour held a double-digit lead over the SNP in the opinion polls, 44% to 29%. The SNP's support subsequently rallied, with the two parties level in April polling. In the final poll on the eve of the election, the SNP were eleven points clear of Labour.

The chart shows the relative state of the parties since polling began from 2009, until the date of the election. The constituency vote is shown as semi-transparent lines, while the regional vote is shown in full lines.

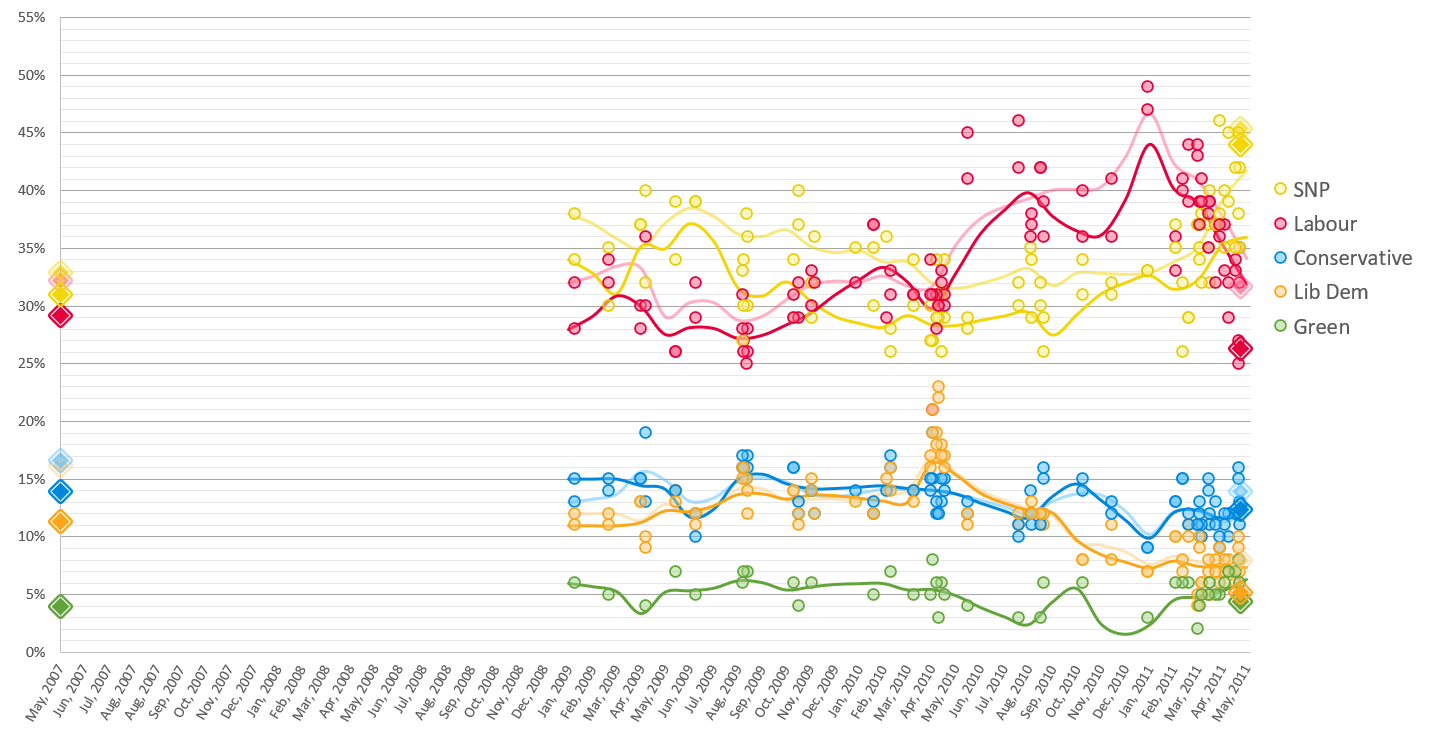
Average 30-day trend line of poll results for the 2011 Scottish Parliament election. Results from 30 January 2009 to 4 May 2011

== Result ==
Election result with constituency names labeled

The election produced a majority SNP government, making this the first time in the Scottish Parliament where a party had commanded a parliamentary majority. The SNP took 16 seats from Labour, many of whose key figures failed to be returned to parliament, although Labour leader Iain Gray retained East Lothian by 151 votes. The SNP took a further eight seats from the Liberal Democrats and one seat from the Conservatives. The SNP overall majority meant that there was sufficient support in the Scottish Parliament to hold a referendum on Scottish independence.

Labour's defeat was attributed to several factors: the party focused too heavily on criticising the Conservative-led coalition at Westminster, and assumed that former Lib Dem voters would automatically switch their vote to Labour, when in fact they appeared to have haemorrhaged support to the SNP. Jackie Baillie compared the result to Labour's performance in the 1983 UK general election. Iain Gray conceded defeat to Alex Salmond and announced his intention to resign as leader of the Labour group of MSPs that autumn.

The election saw a rout of the Liberal Democrats, with no victories in mainland constituencies and 25 lost deposits (candidates gaining less than five per cent of the vote). Leader Tavish Scott said their performance was due to the Liberal Democrats' involvement in the Westminster Government, which had been unpopular with many former LibDem supporters. Scott resigned as leader two days after the election.

For the Conservatives, the main disappointment was the loss of Edinburgh Pentlands, the seat of former party leader David McLetchie, to the SNP. McLetchie was elected on the Lothian regional list and the Conservatives only made a net loss of five seats, with leader Annabel Goldie claiming that their support had held firm. Prime Minister David Cameron congratulated the SNP on the result, but vowed to campaign for the Union in any independence referendum.

The Scottish Greens won two seats, including their co-convenor Patrick Harvie. Margo MacDonald again won election as an independent on the Lothian regional list. George Galloway, under a Unionist anti-cuts banner, failed to receive enough votes to be elected to the Glasgow regional list.

The SNP's overall majority assured Salmond of another term as First Minister, and he was reelected unopposed on 18 May.

Party	Constituency				Regional				Total seats	+/–
Party	Votes	%	+/–	Seats	Votes	%	+/–	Seats	Total seats	+/–
Scottish National Party	902,915	45.39	+12.45	53	876,421	44.02	+13.00	16	69	+22
Labour	630,461	31.69	–0.46	15	523,469	26.29	–2.86	22	37	–9
Conservatives	276,652	13.91	–2.69	3	245,967	12.35	–1.55	12	15	–2
Liberal Democrats	157,714	7.93	–8.25	2	103,472	5.20	–6.09	3	5	–11
Greens					86,939	4.37	+0.33	2	2	0
Scottish Senior Citizens Unity Party	1,618	0.08	+0.00	0	33,253	1.67	–0.24	0	0	0
UK Independence Party	2,508	0.13	+0.13	0	18,138	0.91	+0.51	0	0	0
Scottish Christian Party	1,193	0.06	–0.17	0	16,466	0.83	–0.47	0	0	0
Socialist Labour Party					16,847	0.85	+0.16	0	0	0
British National Party					15,580	0.78	–0.42	0	0	0
Scottish Socialist Party					8,272	0.42	–0.22	0	0	0
Respect Party					6,972	0.35	New	0	0	New
Scottish Unionist Party					3,002	0.15	–0.07	0	0	0
Ban Bankers Bonuses					2,968	0.15	New	0	0	New
Solidarity					2,837	0.14	–1.38	0	0	0
Liberal Party	436	0.02	New	0	2,393	0.12	New	0	0	New
National Front	1,515	0.08	New	0	640	0.03	New	0	0	New
Angus Independents Representatives	1,321	0.07	New	0	471	0.02	New	0	0	New
Pirate Party UK					1,431	0.07	New	0	0	New
Christian Peoples Alliance					1,191	0.06	–0.66	0	0	0
Scotland Homeland Party					616	0.03	New	0	0	New
Land Party	276	0.01	New	0					0	New
Communist Party of Britain	256	0.01	New	0					0	New
Independents	12,411	0.62	–0.61	0	23,491	1.18	+0.10	1	1	0
Total	1,989,276	100.00	–	73	1,990,836	100.00	–	56	129	0
Valid votes	1,989,276	99.68			1,990,836	99.70				
Invalid/blank votes	6,363	0.32			5,987	0.30				
Total votes	1,995,639	100.00			1,996,823	100.00				
Registered voters/turnout	3,950,626	50.51			3,950,626	50.54				
Source: Scottish Parliament

=== Votes summary ===
Popular Vote (Constituency)
SNP	45.39%
Labour	31.69%
Conservative	13.91%
Liberal Democrats	7.93%
Other	1.08%

Popular Vote (Regional)
SNP	44.04%
Labour	26.31%
Conservative	12.36%
Liberal Democrats	5.20%
Green	4.38%
Other	7.71%

Parliament seats
SNP	53.49%
Labour	28.68%
Conservative	11.63%
Liberal Democrats	3.88%
Green	1.55%
Other	0.78%

=== Constituency and regional summary ===
==== Central Scotland ====
Scottish Parliament general election, 2011: Central Scotland
Constituency	Elected member	Result
Airdrie and Shotts	Alex Neil	SNP gain from Labour
Coatbridge and Chryston	Elaine Smith	Labour hold
Cumbernauld and Kilsyth	Jamie Hepburn	SNP gain from Labour
East Kilbride	Linda Fabiani	SNP gain from Labour
Falkirk East	Angus MacDonald	SNP gain from Labour
Falkirk West	Michael Matheson	SNP hold
Hamilton, Larkhall and Stonehouse	Christina McKelvie	SNP gain from Labour
Motherwell and Wishaw	John Pentland	Labour hold
Uddingston and Bellshill	Michael McMahon	Labour hold

Scottish parliamentary election, 2011: Central Scotland
Party	Elected candidates	Seats	+/−	Votes	%	+/−%
SNP	Richard Lyle; John Wilson; Clare Adamson	3	−2	108,261	46.4	+15.5
Labour	Siobhan McMahon; Mark Griffin; Margaret McCulloch	3	+3	82,459	35.3	−4.6
Conservative	Margaret Mitchell	1	±0	14,870	6.4	−1.9
Liberal Democrats		0	−1	3,318	1.4	−3.8

==== Glasgow ====
Scottish Parliament general election, 2011: Glasgow
Constituency	Elected member	Result
Glasgow Anniesland	Bill Kidd	SNP gain from Labour
Glasgow Cathcart	James Dornan	SNP gain from Labour
Glasgow Kelvin	Sandra White	SNP gain from Labour
Glasgow Maryhill and Springburn	Patricia Ferguson	Labour hold
Glasgow Pollok	Johann Lamont	Labour hold
Glasgow Provan	Paul Martin	Labour hold
Glasgow Shettleston	John Mason	SNP gain from Labour
Glasgow Southside	Nicola Sturgeon	SNP hold
Rutherglen	James Kelly	Labour hold

Scottish parliamentary election, 2011: Glasgow
Party	Elected candidates	Seats	+/−	Votes	%	+/−%
SNP	Humza Yousaf; Bob Doris	2	−2	83,109	39.8	+12.8
Labour	Hanzala Malik; Drew Smith; Anne McTaggart	3	+3	73,031	35.0	−3.3
Conservative	Ruth Davidson	1	±0	12,749	6.1	−0.6
Green	Patrick Harvie	1	±0	12,454	6.0	+0.6
Liberal Democrats		0	−1	5,312	2.5	−4.6

==== Highlands and Islands ====
Scottish Parliament general election, 2011: Highlands and Islands
Constituency	Elected member	Result
Argyll & Bute	Michael Russell	SNP hold
Caithness, Sutherland & Ross	Rob Gibson	SNP gain from Liberal Democrats
Inverness & Nairn	Fergus Ewing	SNP hold
Moray	Richard Lochhead	SNP hold
Na h-Eileanan an Iar	Alasdair Allan	SNP hold
Orkney	Liam McArthur	Liberal Democrats hold
Shetland	Tavish Scott	Liberal Democrats hold
Skye, Lochaber & Badenoch	Dave Thompson	SNP gain from Liberal Democrats

Scottish parliamentary election, 2011: Highlands and Islands
Party	Elected candidates	Seats	+/−	Votes	%	+/−%
SNP	John Finnie; Jean Urquhart; Mike MacKenzie	3	+1	85,028	47.5	+13.1
Labour	Rhoda Grant; David Stewart	2	−1	25,884	14.5	−3.2
Liberal Democrats		0	±0	21,729	12.1	−8.0
Conservative	Jamie McGrigor; Mary Scanlon	2	±0	20,843	11.6	−0.8

==== Lothian ====
Scottish Parliament general election, 2011: Lothian
Constituency	Elected member	Result
Almond Valley	Angela Constance	SNP hold
Edinburgh Central	Marco Biagi	SNP gain from Labour
Edinburgh Eastern	Kenny MacAskill	SNP hold
Edinburgh Northern and Leith	Malcolm Chisholm	Labour hold
Edinburgh Pentlands	Gordon MacDonald	SNP gain from Conservative
Edinburgh Southern	Jim Eadie	SNP gain from Liberal Democrats
Edinburgh Western	Colin Keir	SNP gain from Liberal Democrats
Linlithgow	Fiona Hyslop	SNP gain from Labour
Midlothian North & Musselburgh	Colin Beattie	SNP gain from Labour

Scottish parliamentary election, 2011: Lothian
Party	Elected candidates	Seats	+/−	Votes	%	+/−%
SNP		0	−3	110,953	39.2	+12.9
Labour	Sarah Boyack; Kezia Dugdale; Neil Findlay	3	+2	70,544	24.9	−1.3
Conservative	David McLetchie; Gavin Brown	2	+1	33,019	11.7	−1.5
Green	Alison Johnstone	1	±0	21,505	7.6	+0.5
Independent	Margo MacDonald	1	±0	18,732	6.6	0.0
Liberal Democrats		0	=0	15,588	5.5	−7.3

==== Mid Scotland and Fife ====
Scottish Parliament general election, 2011: Mid Scotland and Fife
Constituency	Elected member	Result
Clackmannanshire & Dunblane	Keith Brown	SNP hold
Cowdenbeath	Helen Eadie	Labour hold
Dunfermline	Bill Walker	SNP gain from Liberal Democrats
Fife North East	Roderick Campbell	SNP gain from Liberal Democrats
Kirkcaldy	David Torrance	SNP gain from Labour
Mid Fife & Glenrothes	Tricia Marwick	SNP hold
Perthshire North	John Swinney	SNP hold
Perthshire South & Kinross-shire	Roseanna Cunningham	SNP hold
Stirling	Bruce Crawford	SNP gain from Labour

Scottish Parliament election, 2011: Mid Scotland and Fife
Party	Elected candidates	Seats	+/−	Votes	%	+/−%
SNP	Annabelle Ewing	1	±0	116,691	45.2	+12.7
Labour	John Park; Claire Brennan-Baker; Richard Simpson	3	0	64,623	25.0	−2.1
Conservative	Murdo Fraser; Liz Smith	2	−1	36,458	14.1	−1.5
Liberal Democrats	Willie Rennie	1	+1	15,103	5.9	−7.7

==== North East Scotland ====
Scottish Parliament general election, 2011: North East Scotland
Constituency	Elected member	Result
Aberdeen Central	Kevin Stewart	SNP gain from Labour
Aberdeen Donside	Brian Adam	SNP hold
Aberdeen South & North Kincardine	Maureen Watt	SNP gain from Liberal Democrats
Aberdeenshire East	Alex Salmond	SNP hold
Aberdeenshire West	Dennis Robertson	SNP gain from Liberal Democrats
Angus North & Mearns	Nigel Don	SNP hold
Angus South	Graeme Dey	SNP hold
Banffshire & Buchan Coast	Stewart Stevenson	SNP hold
Dundee City East	Shona Robison	SNP hold
Dundee City West	Joe Fitzpatrick	SNP hold

Scottish Parliament election, 2011: North East Scotland
Party	Elected candidates	Seats	+/−	Votes	%	+/−%
SNP	Mark McDonald	1	±0	140,749	52.7	+12.2
Labour	Richard Baker; Jenny Marra; Lewis MacDonald	3	±0	43,893	16.4	−3.2
Conservative	Alex Johnstone; Nanette Milne	2	±0	37,681	14.1	−1.1
Liberal Democrats	Alison McInnes	1	±0	18,178	6.8	−8.4

==== South Scotland ====
Scottish Parliament general election, 2011: South Scotland
Constituency	Elected member	Result
Ayr	John Scott	Conservative hold
Carrick, Cumnock and Doon Valley	Adam Ingram	SNP gain from Labour
Clydesdale	Aileen Campbell	SNP gain from Labour
Dumfriesshire	Elaine Murray	Labour hold
East Lothian	Iain Gray	Labour hold
Ettrick, Roxburgh and Berwickshire	John Lamont	Conservative hold
Galloway and West Dumfries	Alex Fergusson	Conservative hold
Kilmarnock and Irvine Valley	Willie Coffey	SNP hold
Midlothian South, Tweeddale and Lauderdale	Christine Grahame	SNP hold

Scottish Parliament election, 2011: South Scotland
Party	Elected candidates	Seats	+/−	Votes	%	+/−%
SNP	Joan McAlpine; Aileen McLeod; Paul Wheelhouse; Chic Brodie	4	−1	114,270	40.96	+12.4
Labour	Claudia Beamish; Graeme Pearson	2	+2	70,596	25.3	−3.5
Conservative		0	−1	54,352	19.48	−2.8
Liberal Democrats	Jim Hume	1	±0	15,096	5.41	−4.5

==== West Scotland ====
Scottish Parliament general election, 2011: West Scotland
Constituency	Elected member	Result
Clydebank & Milngavie	Gil Paterson	SNP gain from Labour
Cunninghame North	Kenneth Gibson	SNP hold
Cunninghame South	Margaret Burgess	SNP gain from Labour
Dumbarton	Jackie Baillie	Labour hold
Eastwood	Ken Macintosh	Labour hold
Greenock & Inverclyde	Duncan McNeil	Labour hold
Paisley	George Adam	SNP gain from Labour
Renfrewshire North & West	Derek Mackay	SNP gain from Labour
Renfrewshire South	Hugh Henry	Labour hold
Strathkelvin & Bearsden	Fiona McLeod	SNP gain from Labour

Scottish Parliament election, 2011: West Scotland
Party	Elected candidates	Seats	+/−	Votes	%	+/−%
SNP	Stewart Maxwell; Stuart McMillan	2	−2	117,306	41.5	+13.0
Labour	Mary Fee; Neil Bibby; Margaret McDougall	3	+3	92,530	32.8	−1.8
Conservative	Annabel Goldie; Jackson Carlaw	2	±0	35,995	12.7	−2.0
Liberal Democrats		0	−1	9,148	3.2	−4.9

== Top target seats of the main parties ==
Below are listed all the constituencies which required a swing of less than 5% from the 2007 result to change hands. Because the election was fought under new boundaries, the figures are based on notional results from 2007.

=== SNP targets ===
Rank	Constituency	Winning party 2007	Swing to gain	SNP's place 2007	Result
1	Glasgow Southside	Labour	0.07	2nd	SNP gain
2	Linlithgow	Labour	0.45	2nd	SNP gain
3	Stirling	Labour	0.61	2nd	SNP gain
4	Edinburgh Eastern	Labour	0.80	2nd	SNP gain
5	Airdrie and Shotts	Labour	1.32	2nd	SNP gain
6	Clydesdale	Labour	1.85	2nd	SNP gain
7	Glasgow Kelvin	Labour	2.23	2nd	SNP gain
8	Midlothian North & Musselburgh	Labour	2.59	2nd	SNP gain
9	Dumbarton	Labour	2.64	2nd	Labour hold
10	Falkirk East	Labour	3.05	2nd	SNP gain
11	East Lothian	Labour	3.76	2nd	Labour hold
12	East Kilbride	Labour	3.78	2nd	SNP gain
13	Glasgow Cathcart	Labour	3.50	2nd	SNP gain
14	Edinburgh Northern & Leith	Labour	3.63	2nd	Labour hold
15	Aberdeen South & North Kincardine	Liberal Democrats	3.66	2nd	SNP gain
16	Galloway & West Dumfries	Conservative	3.84	2nd	Con hold
17	Cumbernauld & Kilsyth	Labour	3.94	2nd	SNP gain
18	Edinburgh Central	Liberal Democrats	4.05	3rd	SNP gain
19	Caithness, Sutherland & Ross	Liberal Democrats	4.28	2nd	SNP gain
20	Edinburgh Pentlands	Conservative	4.49	3rd	SNP gain
21	Dunfermline	Liberal Democrats	4.55	3rd	SNP gain
22	Cunninghame South	Labour	4.61	2nd	SNP gain

=== Conservative targets ===
Rank	Constituency	Winning party 2007	Swing to gain	Con place 2007	Result
1	Perthshire South & Kinross-shire	SNP	2.23	2nd	SNP hold

=== Labour targets ===
Rank	Constituency	Winning party 2007	Swing to gain	Labour's place 2007	Result
1	Almond Valley	SNP	0.007	2nd	SNP hold
2	Cunninghame North	SNP	0.07	2nd	SNP hold
3	Dunfermline	Liberal Democrats	0.14	2nd	SNP gain
4	Aberdeen Central	SNP	0.69	2nd	SNP hold
5	Dumfriesshire	Conservative	1.05	2nd	Labour gain
6	Edinburgh Central	Liberal Democrats	1.28	2nd	SNP gain
7	Falkirk West	SNP	1.28	2nd	SNP hold
8	Clackmannanshire & Dunblane	SNP	1.39	2nd	SNP hold
9	Kilmarnock & Irvine Valley	SNP	2.01	2nd	SNP hold
10	Na h-Eileanan an Iar	SNP	2.52	2nd	SNP hold
11	Dundee City West	SNP	4.22	2nd	SNP hold
12	Edinburgh Pentlands	Conservative	4.31	2nd	SNP gain
13	Mid Fife & Glenrothes	SNP	4.53	2nd	SNP hold

=== Liberal Democrat targets ===
Rank	Constituency	Winning party 2007	Swing to gain	LD's place 2007	Result
1	Argyll & Bute	SNP	1.41	2nd	SNP hold
2	Aberdeen Central	SNP	1.70	3rd	SNP hold
3	Midlothian South, Tweeddale & Lauderdale	SNP	1.66	2nd	SNP hold
4	Ettrick, Roxburgh & Berwickshire	Conservative	2.61	2nd	Con hold
5	Edinburgh Northern and Leith	Labour	4.16	3rd	Labour hold

== Incumbents defeated ==
Constituency/Region	MSP	Party	MSP Since	Office previously held
Airdrie and Shotts	Karen Whitefield	Scottish Labour	1999	
Cumbernauld and Kilsyth	Cathie Craigie	Scottish Labour	1999	
East Kilbride	Andy Kerr	Scottish Labour	1999	Minister for Finance and Public Services
Falkirk East	Cathy Peattie	Scottish Labour	1999	
Glasgow Anniesland	Bill Butler	Scottish Labour	2000	
Glasgow Cathcart	Charlie Gordon	Scottish Labour	2005	
Glasgow Kelvin	Pauline McNeill	Scottish Labour	1999	
Glasgow Shettleston	Frank McAveety	Scottish Labour	1999	Minister for Tourism, Culture and Sport
Kirkcaldy	Marilyn Livingstone	Scottish Labour	1999	
Hamilton, Larkhall and Stonehouse	Tom McCabe	Scottish Labour	1999	
Clydesdale	Karen Gillon	Scottish Labour	1999	
Clydebank and Milngavie	Des McNulty	Scottish Labour	1999	Deputy Minister for Communities
Cunninghame South	Irene Oldfather	Scottish Labour	1999	
Strathkelvin and Bearsden	David Whitton	Scottish Labour	2007	
Edinburgh South	Mike Pringle	Scottish Liberal Democrats	2003	
North East Fife	Iain Smith	Scottish Liberal Democrats	1999	
West Aberdeenshire and Kincardine	Mike Rumbles	Scottish Liberal Democrats	1999	
Glasgow	Robert Brown	Scottish Liberal Democrats	1999	
West of Scotland	Ross Finnie	Scottish Liberal Democrats	1999	Minister for the Environment and Rural Development
Tweeddale, Ettrick and Lauderdale	Jeremy Purvis	Scottish Liberal Democrats	2003	
Edinburgh West	Margaret Smith	Scottish Liberal Democrats	1999	
Dunfermline West	Jim Tolson	Scottish Liberal Democrats	2007	
Central Scotland	Hugh O'Donnell	Scottish Liberal Democrats	2007	
South of Scotland	Derek Brownlee	Scottish Conservatives	2005	
Glasgow	Anne McLaughlin	Scottish National Party	2009	
Lothian	Shirley-Anne Somerville	Scottish National Party	2007	
Lothian (was previously member in West of Scotland)	Bill Wilson	Scottish National Party	2007	

== See also ==
- Arbuthnott Commission
- 2011 National Assembly for Wales election
- 2011 Northern Ireland Assembly election
- Murphy and Boyack review of the Labour Party in Scotland
- 2011 Scottish Labour leadership election
- 2011 Scottish Conservatives leadership election
- 2011 Scottish Liberal Democrats leadership election
