= Edinburgh North and Leith =

Edinburgh North and Leith may refer to:

- Edinburgh North and Leith (Scottish Parliament constituency)
- Edinburgh Northern and Leith (Scottish Parliament constituency)
- Edinburgh North and Leith (UK Parliament constituency)
