= Edinburgh West =

Edinburgh West may refer to:

- Edinburgh West (UK Parliament constituency)
- Edinburgh West (Scottish Parliament constituency)
  - later Edinburgh Western (Scottish Parliament constituency)
