= Edinburgh South (Scottish Parliament constituency) =

Scottish Parliament constituency

- Former burgh constituency for the Scottish Parliament
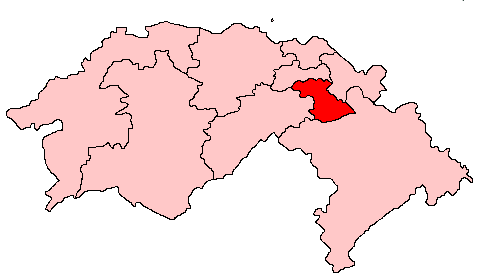

- Edinburgh South shown within the Lothians electoral region and the region shown within Scotland

Former constituency
- Created: 1999
- Abolished: 2011
- Council area: City of Edinburgh
- Replaced by: Edinburgh Eastern, Edinburgh Southern

Edinburgh South was a constituency of the Scottish Parliament (Holyrood). It elected one Member of the Scottish Parliament (MSP) by the plurality (first past the post) method of election. It was also one of nine constituencies in the Lothians electoral region, which elected seven additional members, in addition to nine constituency MSPs, to produce a form of proportional representation for the region as a whole.

For the Scottish Parliament election, 2011, Edinburgh South was redrawn and replaced by the renamed Edinburgh Southern constituency.

== Electoral region ==
The other eight constituencies of the Lothians region were: Edinburgh Central, Edinburgh East and Musselburgh, Edinburgh North and Leith, Edinburgh Pentlands, Edinburgh West, Linlithgow, Livingston and Midlothian.

The region covered the City of Edinburgh council area, the West Lothian council area, part of the Midlothian council area, and part of the East Lothian council area.

== Constituency boundaries and council area ==
The Edinburgh South constituency was created at the same time as the Scottish Parliament, in 1999, with the name and boundaries of an existing Westminster constituency. In 2005, however, Scottish Westminster (House of Commons) constituencies were mostly replaced with new constituencies.

The Holyrood constituency covered a southern portion of the City of Edinburgh council area. The rest of the city area was covered by five other constituencies, all also in the Lothians electoral region: Edinburgh West, Edinburgh Central, Edinburgh Pentlands, Edinburgh North and Leith, and Edinburgh East and Musselburgh.

Edinburgh South had boundaries with the Edinburgh West constituency, the Edinburgh Central constituency, and the Edinburgh East and Musselburgh constituency.

Edinburgh East and Musselburgh also covered the Musselburgh portion of the East Lothian council area. The rest of the East Lothian area was covered by the East Lothian constituency, which is in the South of Scotland electoral region.

=== Wards ===
Edinburgh South included the wards of Alnwickhill, Gilmerton, Kaimes, Marchmont, Merchiston, Moredun, Newington, North Morningside and the Grange, Prestonfield, and Sciennes, and part of the South Morningside ward, which was split with Edinburgh Pentlands. The wards were created in 1999, at the same time as the constituency, and were replaced with new wards in 2007, without change to constituency boundaries.

To create the new "Edinburgh Southern" for the 2011 Scottish Parliament election, the electoral wards used were Sighthill / Gorgie; Fountainbridge / Craiglockhart; Meadows / Morningside; Southside / Newington; Liberton / Gilmerton; Portobello / Craigmillar. All these wards were divided between Southern and neighbouring constituencies, not one was contained whole within the new boundaries.

== Constituency profile ==
Edinburgh South was predominantly suburban. It included Marchmont, Merchiston, Newington, the Grange, Sciennes and a northern area of Morningside, Moredun, Little France, Inch and Gilmerton.

== Members of the Scottish Parliament ==
Election	Member	Party
1999	Angus MacKay	Scottish Labour Party
2003	Mike Pringle	Scottish Liberal Democrats
2011	constituency abolished: replaced by Edinburgh Southern	

== Election results ==
2007 Scottish Parliament election: Edinburgh South
Party	Candidate	Votes	%	±%
Liberal Democrats	Mike Pringle	11,398	35.0	+2.9
Labour	Donald Anderson	9,469	29.1	−2.5
SNP	Robert Holland	6,117	18.8	+4.7
Conservative	Gavin Brown	5,589	17.2	+0.6
Majority		1,929	5.9	+5.4
Turnout		32,573	56.6	+4.9
Liberal Democrats hold		Swing		

2003 Scottish Parliament election: Edinburgh South
Party	Candidate	Votes	%	±%
Liberal Democrats	Mike Pringle	10,005	32.07	+9.74
Labour	Angus MacKay	9,847	31.56	−5.49
Conservative	Gordon Buchan	5,180	16.60	+0.71
SNP	Alex Orr	4,396	14.09	−9.44
Scottish Socialist	Shirley Gibb	1,768	5.67	New
Majority		158	0.51	N/A
Turnout		31,196	51.68	−10.94
Liberal Democrats gain from Labour		Swing	+7.62	

1999 Scottish Parliament election: Edinburgh South
Party	Candidate	Votes	%	±%
Labour	Angus MacKay	14,869	37.05	N/A
SNP	Margo MacDonald	9,445	23.53	N/A
Liberal Democrats	Mike Pringle	8,961	22.33	N/A
Conservative	Iain Whyte	6,378	15.89	N/A
Socialist Workers	William Black	482	1.20	N/A
Majority		5,424	13.52	N/A
Turnout		40,135	62.62	N/A
Labour win (new seat)				

== Footnotes ==
=== See also ===
- Bruntsfield, Edinburgh
- Morningside, Edinburgh
- Politics of Edinburgh
