= Edinburgh South =

Edinburgh South may refer to:

- Edinburgh South (UK Parliament constituency)
- Edinburgh South (Scottish Parliament constituency)
  - later Edinburgh Southern (Scottish Parliament constituency)
