= Edinburgh East and Musselburgh =

Edinburgh East and Musselburgh may refer to:

- Edinburgh East and Musselburgh (Scottish Parliament constituency), from 1999
- Edinburgh East and Musselburgh (UK Parliament constituency), 1997–2005 and from 2023
