= Edinburgh North and Leith (Scottish Parliament constituency) =

Scottish Parliament constituency

- Former burgh constituency for the Scottish Parliament
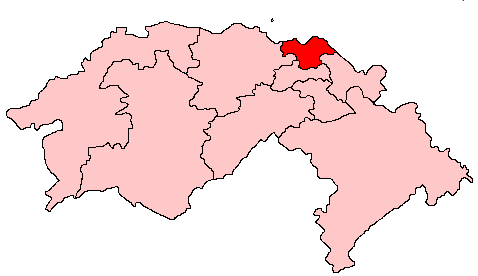

- Edinburgh North and Leith shown within the Lothians electoral region and the region shown within Scotland

Former constituency
- Created: 1999
- Abolished: 2011
- Council area: City of Edinburgh
- Replaced by: Edinburgh Northern and Leith

Edinburgh North and Leith was a constituency of the Scottish Parliament. It elected one Member of the Scottish Parliament (MSP) by the plurality (first past the post) method of election. It was also one of nine constituencies in the Lothians electoral region, which elected seven additional members, in addition to nine constituency MSPs, to produce a form of proportional representation for the region as a whole.

For the Scottish Parliament election, 2011, the constituency was largely replaced by Edinburgh Northern and Leith.

The Scottish Parliament and UK Westminster constituency originally held the same boundaries, however, after the redrawing of the UK constituency boundaries they no longer share the same boundaries.

== Electoral region ==
See also Lothians (Scottish Parliament electoral region)

The other eight constituencies of the Lothians region were: Edinburgh Central, Edinburgh East and Musselburgh, Edinburgh Pentlands, Edinburgh South, Edinburgh West, Linlithgow, Livingston and Midlothian.

The region covered the City of Edinburgh council area, the West Lothian council area, part of the Midlothian council area, and part of the East Lothian council area.

== Constituency boundaries ==
The Edinburgh North and Leith constituency was created at the same time as the Scottish Parliament, in 1999, with the same name and boundaries as an existing Westminster constituency. In 2005, however, Scottish House of Commons constituencies were mostly replaced with new constituencies.

=== Council area ===
The Holyrood constituency covered a northern portion of the City of Edinburgh council area. The rest of the city area was covered by five other constituencies, all also in the Lothians electoral region: Edinburgh East and Musselburgh, Edinburgh Central, Edinburgh South, Edinburgh Pentlands, Edinburgh West.

Edinburgh North and Leith had boundaries with the Edinburgh East and Musselburgh constituency, the Edinburgh Central constituency and the Edinburgh West constituency.

The Edinburgh East and Musselburgh constituency also covered the Musselburgh portion of the East Lothian council area. The rest of the East Lothian area was covered by the East Lothian constituency, which was in the South of Scotland electoral region.

=== Wards ===
Edinburgh North and Leith included the wards of Broughton, Calton, Granton, Harbour, Lorne, New Town, Newhaven, Stockbridge, Trinity, and part of the Pilton ward, which is split with the Edinburgh West constituency. The wards were created in 1999, at the same time as the constituency, and was replaced with new wards in 2007, without change to constituency boundaries.

== Constituency profile ==
Edinburgh North and Leith was an urban constituency. It included Granton, Leith, New Town, Newhaven, Stockbridge, Trinity and a part of the Pilton area.

== Member of the Scottish Parliament ==
Election	Member	Party
1999	Malcolm Chisholm	Labour
2011	constituency abolished: replaced by Edinburgh Northern and Leith	

== Election results ==
2007 Scottish Parliament election: Edinburgh North and Leith
Party	Candidate	Votes	%	±%
Labour	Malcolm Chisholm	11,020	34.8	−3.4
Liberal Democrats	Mike Crockart	8,576	27.1	+10.5
SNP	Davie Hutchison	8,044	25.4	+6.0
Conservative	Iain Whyte	4,045	12.8	−4.0
Majority		2,444	7.7	−11.1
Turnout		31,685	52.8	+5.3
Labour hold		Swing		

2003 Scottish Parliament election: Edinburgh North and Leith
Party	Candidate	Votes	%	±%
Labour	Malcolm Chisholm	10,979	38.21	−8.73
SNP	Anne Dana	5,565	19.37	−5.34
Conservative	Ian Mowat	4,821	16.78	+3.05
Liberal Democrats	Sebastian Tombs	4,785	16.65	+5.65
Scottish Socialist	Bill Scott	2,584	8.99	+6.51
Majority		5,414	18.84	−2.27
Turnout		28,734	47.49	−10.70
Labour hold		Swing		

1999 Scottish Parliament election: Edinburgh North and Leith
Party	Candidate	Votes	%	±%
Labour	Malcolm Chisholm	17,203	46.94	N/A
SNP	Anne Dana	9,467	25.83	N/A
Conservative	Jamie Sempill	5,030	13.73	N/A
Liberal Democrats	Sebastian Tombs	4,039	11.02	N/A
Scottish Socialist	Ron Brown	907	2.48	N/A
Majority		7,736	21.11	N/A
Turnout		36,646	58.19	N/A
Labour win (new seat)				

== See also ==
- Politics of Edinburgh
- Members of the Scottish Parliament, 2003-2007
