= Edinburgh West (Scottish Parliament constituency) =

Former constituency of the Scottish Parliament, at Holyrood

- Former burgh constituency for the Scottish Parliament
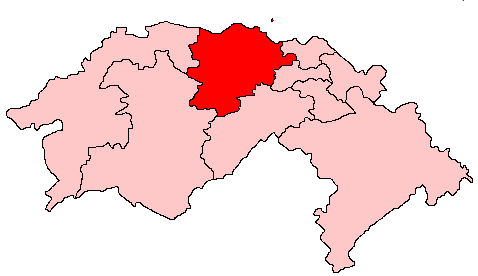
- Edinburgh West shown within the Lothians electoral region

Former constituency
- Created: 1999
- Abolished: 2011
- Council area: City of Edinburgh
- Replaced by: Edinburgh Western (majority), Edinburgh Pentlands (part)

Edinburgh West was a constituency of the Scottish Parliament from 1999 until 2011. It elected one Member of the Scottish Parliament (MSP) by the plurality (first past the post) method of election. It was also one of nine constituencies in the Lothians electoral region, which elected seven additional members, in addition to nine constituency MSPs, to produce a form of proportional representation for the region as a whole.

From the Scottish Parliament election, 2011, the Edinburgh West constituency was re-drawn and renamed Edinburgh Western.

== Electoral region ==
The other eight constituencies of the Lothians region were: Edinburgh Central, Edinburgh East and Musselburgh, Edinburgh North and Leith, Edinburgh Pentlands, Edinburgh South, Linlithgow, Livingston and Midlothian.

The region covered the City of Edinburgh council area, the West Lothian council area, part of the Midlothian council area, and part of the East Lothian council area.

== Constituency boundaries and council area ==
The Edinburgh West constituency was created at the same time as the Scottish Parliament, in 1999, with the name and boundaries of an existing Westminster constituency. In 2005, however, Scottish Westminster (House of Commons) constituencies were mostly replaced with new constituencies.

The Holyrood constituency covered a western portion of the City of Edinburgh council area. The rest of the city area was covered by five other constituencies, all also in the Lothians electoral region: Edinburgh North and Leith, Edinburgh Central, Edinburgh Pentlands, Edinburgh East and Musselburgh and Edinburgh South,

Edinburgh West had boundaries with the Edinburgh North and Leith constituency, the Edinburgh Central constituency, and the Edinburgh Pentlands constituency.

Edinburgh East and Musselburgh also covered the Musselburgh portion of the East Lothian council area. The rest of the East Lothian area was covered by the East Lothian constituency, which was in the South of Scotland electoral region.

=== Wards ===
Edinburgh West included the wards of Cramond, Dalmeny and Kirkliston, Davidson's Mains, East Craigs, Gyle, Muirhouse and Drylaw, Murrayfield, North East Corstorphine, South Queensferry, South East Corstorphine, and Stenhouse, part of the Craigleith ward, which was split with Edinburgh Central, and part of the Pilton ward, which was split with Edinburgh North and Leith. The wards were created in 1999, at the same time as the constituency, and were replaced with new wards in 2007, without change to constituency boundaries.

From the 2011 election, Edinburgh West was redrawn and renamed "Edinburgh Western". The electoral wards used in this seat were;

- In full: Almond, Drum Brae/Gyle
- In part: Forth, Inverleith, Corstorphine/Murrayfield

== Constituency profile ==
Edinburgh West was mostly suburban, but took in rural areas to the west. It included Cramond, Davidson's Mains, East Craigs, Gyle, Murrayfield, Ratho, South Queensferry, a part of the Craigleith area and a part of the Pilton area.

== Members of the Scottish Parliament ==
Election	Member	Party
1999	Margaret Smith	Scottish Liberal Democrats
2011	constituency abolished: replaced by Edinburgh Western	

== Election results ==
2007 Scottish Parliament election: Edinburgh West
Party	Candidate	Votes	%	±%
Liberal Democrats	Margaret Smith	13,677	39.4	−3.9
SNP	Sheena Cleland	7,791	22.4	+10.0
Conservative	Gordon Lindhurst	7,361	21.2	−4.4
Labour	Richard Meade	5,343	15.4	+0.3
Majority		5,886	17.0	−0.8
Turnout		34,752	57.9	+2.5
Liberal Democrats hold		Swing		

2003 Scottish Parliament election: Edinburgh West
Party	Candidate	Votes	%	±%
Liberal Democrats	Margaret Smith	14,434	43.34	+6.88
Conservative	James Douglas-Hamilton	8,520	25.58	+0.14
Labour	Carol Fox	5,046	15.15	−6.16
SNP	Alyn Smith	4,133	12.41	−5.61
Scottish Socialist	Pat Smith	993	2.98	+2.98
Scottish People's	Bruce Skivington	175	0.53	+0.53
Majority		5,914	17.76	+6.74
Turnout		33,301	55.38	−11.97
Liberal Democrats hold		Swing		

1999 Scottish Parliament election: Edinburgh West
Party	Candidate	Votes	%	±%
Liberal Democrats	Margaret Smith	15,161	36.46	N/A
Conservative	James Douglas-Hamilton	10,578	25.44	N/A
Labour	Carol Fox	8,860	21.31	N/A
SNP	Graham Sutherland	6,984	16.80	N/A
Majority		4,583	11.02	N/A
Turnout		41,583	67.35	N/A
Liberal Democrats win (new seat)				

== See also ==
- Politics of Edinburgh
