= Edinburgh Central =

Edinburgh Central may refer to:

- Edinburgh Central (Scottish Parliament constituency), from 1999
- Edinburgh Central (UK Parliament constituency), 1885–2005

== See also ==
- Edinburgh
