= Edinburgh East and Musselburgh (Scottish Parliament constituency) =

Region or constituency of the Scottish Parliament

- Former burgh constituency for the Scottish Parliament
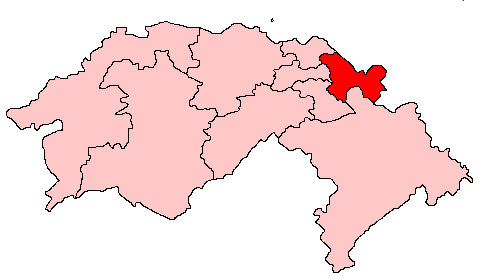

- Edinburgh East and Musselburgh shown within the Lothians electoral region and the region shown within Scotland

Former constituency
- Created: 1999
- Abolished: 2011
- Council area: City of Edinburgh
- Replaced by: Edinburgh Eastern, Midlothian North and Musselburgh

Edinburgh East and Musselburgh was a constituency of the Scottish Parliament (Holyrood) from 1999 to 2011. It elected one Member of the Scottish Parliament (MSP) by the plurality (first past the post) method of election. It was also one of nine constituencies in the Lothians electoral region, which elected seven additional members, in addition to nine constituency MSPs, to produce a form of proportional representation for the region as a whole.

Edinburgh East and Musselburgh was abolished for the 2011 Scottish Parliament election. The successor constituencies were Edinburgh Eastern, and Midlothian North and Musselburgh.

== Electoral region ==
See also Lothians (Scottish Parliament electoral region)

The other eight constituencies of the Lothians region were: Edinburgh Central, Edinburgh North and Leith, Edinburgh Pentlands, Edinburgh South, Edinburgh West, Linlithgow, Livingston and Midlothian.

The region covered the City of Edinburgh council area, the West Lothian council area, part of the Midlothian council area, and part of the East Lothian council area.

== Constituency boundaries ==
The Edinburgh East and Musselburgh constituency was created at the same time as the Scottish Parliament, in 1999, with the name and boundaries of an existing Westminster constituency. In 2005, however, Scottish Westminster (House of Commons) constituencies were mostly replaced with new constituencies.

Edinburgh East and Musselburgh was abolished for the 2011 Scottish Parliament election. Musselburgh was made part of a newly shaped Midlothian North and Musselburgh, whilst eastern Edinburgh was brought together into a newly named Edinburgh Eastern.

=== Council areas ===
The Holyrood constituency covered an eastern portion of the City of Edinburgh council area and the Musselburgh portion of the East Lothian council area.

The rest of the city area was covered by five other constituencies, all also in the Lothians electoral region: Edinburgh South, Edinburgh Central, Edinburgh North and Leith, Edinburgh Pentlands, and Edinburgh West, which were all entirely within the city area. Edinburgh East and Musselburgh had boundaries with the Edinburgh South constituency, the Edinburgh Central constituency and the Edinburgh North and Leith constituency.

The rest of the East Lothian area was covered by the East Lothian constituency, which was in the South of Scotland electoral region.

== Member of the Scottish Parliament ==
Kenny MacAskill of the SNP, the Cabinet Secretary for Justice, had represented the seat since the 2007 election. He was previously an MSP for the Lothians regional list from 1999 to 2007.

Election	Member	Party
1999	Susan Deacon	Scottish Labour Party
2007	Kenny MacAskill	Scottish National Party
2011	constituency abolished: replaced by Edinburgh Eastern	

== Election results ==
2007 Scottish Parliament election: Edinburgh East and Musselburgh
Party	Candidate	Votes	%	±%
SNP	Kenny MacAskill	11,209	37.4	+15.0
Labour	Norman Murray	9,827	32.8	−10.8
Liberal Democrats	Gillian Cole-Hamilton	5,473	18.3	+6.0
Conservative	Christine Wright	3,458	11.5	−1.8
Majority		1,382	4.6	N/A
Turnout		29,967	52.9	+2.6
SNP gain from Labour		Swing	+13.3	

2003 Scottish Parliament election: Edinburgh East and Musselburgh
Party	Candidate	Votes	%	±%
Labour	Susan Deacon	12,655	43.57	−2.62
SNP	Kenny MacAskill	6,497	22.37	−5.67
Conservative	John Smart	3,863	13.30	+0.86
Liberal Democrats	Gary Peacock	3,582	12.33	+1.85
Scottish Socialist	Derek Durkin	2,447	8.43	+6.55
Majority		6,158	21.20	+3.05
Turnout		29,044	50.33	−11.44
Labour hold		Swing		

1999 Scottish Parliament election: Edinburgh East and Musselburgh
Party	Candidate	Votes	%	±%
Labour	Susan Deacon	17,086	46.19	N/A
SNP	Kenny MacAskill	10,370	28.04	N/A
Conservative	Jeremy Balfour	4,600	12.44	N/A
Liberal Democrats	Marjorie Thomas	4,100	11.08	N/A
Scottish Socialist	Derrick White	697	1.88	N/A
Majority		6,714	18.15	N/A
Turnout		36,853	61.77	N/A
Labour win (new seat)				

== See also ==
- Politics of Edinburgh
