= Opinion polling for the 2011 Scottish Parliament election =

In the run-up to the 2011 Scottish Parliament election, several polling organisations carried out public opinion polling in regards to voting intentions. Results of such polls are displayed below. The first figure for each party is for the 1st, first-past-the-post (constituency) vote; the second figure is for the 2nd, proportional representation (regional) vote.

ARPO, ICM, Ipsos MORI, Populus, TNS-BMRB (formerly TNS System Three) and YouGov were members of the British Polling Council, and abided by its disclosure rules. Progressive Partnership-Scottish Opinion and Panelbase, although members of the Market Research Society, were not members of the BPC and did not publish detailed methodology and findings.

== Graphical summary ==
The constituency vote is shown as semi-transparent lines, while the regional vote is shown in full lines.

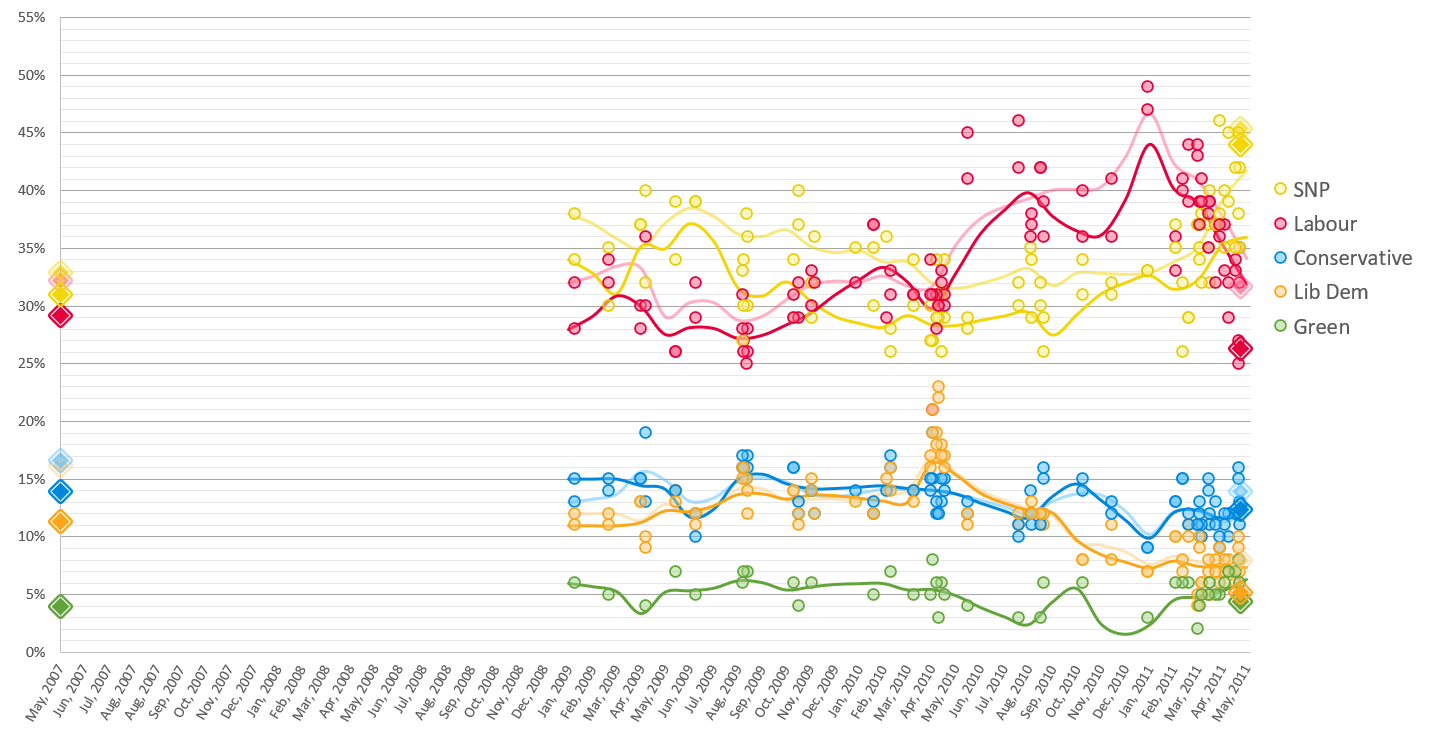
Average 30-day trend line of poll results for the 2016 Scottish Parliament election. Results from 30 January 2009 to 4 May 2011

== Constituency vote ==
=== Graphical summary ===
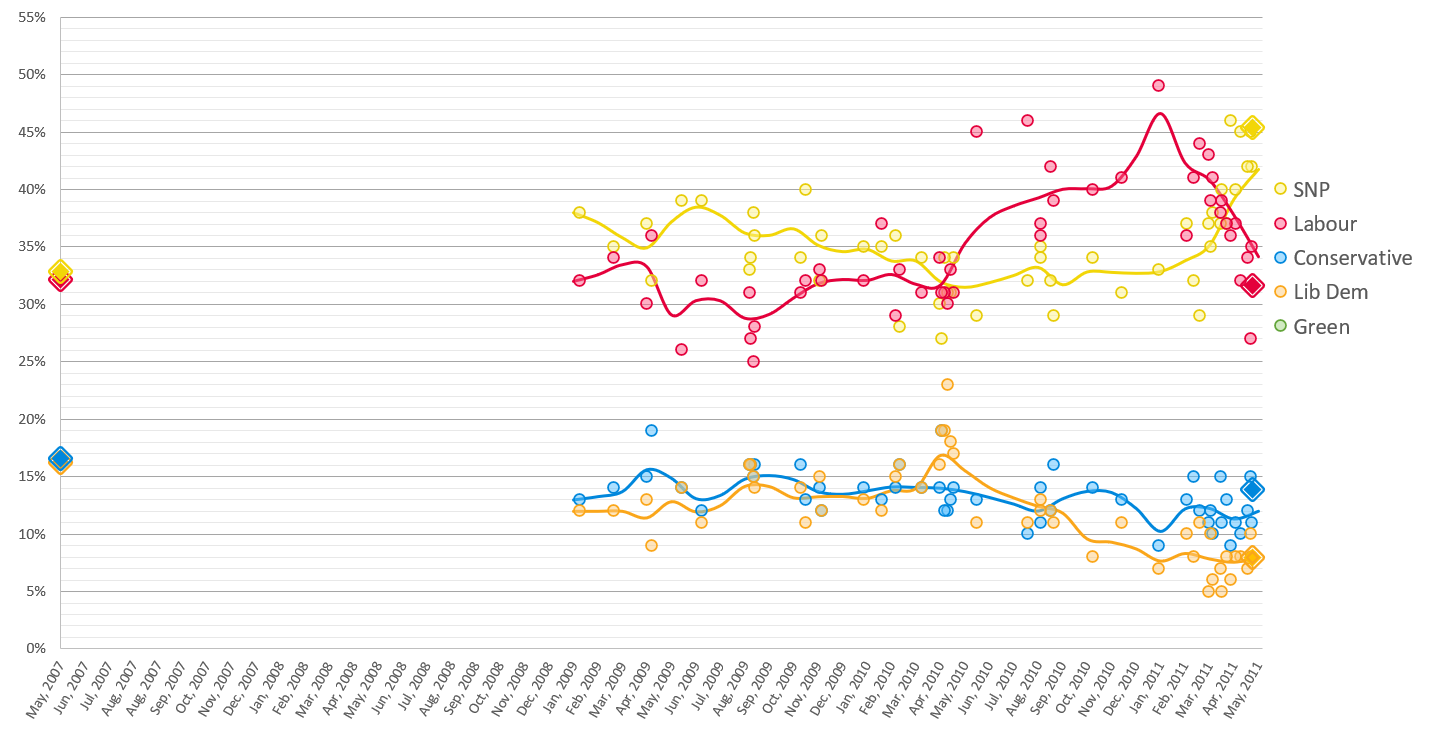

=== Poll results ===
Constituency vote (FPTP)
Firm/Client	Survey end date	SNP	Lab	Con	Lib Dem	Others
2011 Scottish Parliament election		45.39%	31.69%	13.91%	7.93%	1.8%
YouGov	4 May 2011	42%	35%	11%	8%	
TNS-BMRB/STV	3 May 2011	45%	27%	15%	10%	
YouGov/Scotland on Sunday	29 April 2011	42%	34%	12%	7%	5%
YouGov/Scotland on Sunday	21 April 2011	45%	32%	10%	8%	4%
YouGov/Scotland on Sunday	15 April 2011	40%	37%	11%	8%	4%
Scottish Opinion/Sunday Mail	9 April 2011	46%	36%	9%	6%	
panelbase/The Sunday Times	4 April 2011	37%	37%	13%	8%	
YouGov/The Scotsman (tables)	28 March 2011	40%	39%	11%	5%	5%
TNS-BMRB/STV	27 March 2011	37%	38%	15%	7%	3%
YouGov	18 March 2011	38%	41%	10%	6%	5%
ICM/SNP	15 March 2011	35%	39%	12%	10%	-
Scottish Opinion/Mail on Sunday	13 March 2011	37%	43%	11%	5%	4%
TNS-BMRB/Herald	2 March 2011	29%	44%	12%	11%	-
YouGov/Greens	22 February 2011	32%	41%	15%	8%	4%
Ipsos MORI	14 February 2011	37%	36%	13%	10%	4%
TNS-BMRB/Herald	10 January 2011	33%	49%	9%	7%	2%
Ipsos MORI	26 November 2010	31%	41%	13%	11%	5%
YouGov/Scotsman	21 October 2010	34%	40%	14%	8%	5%
YouGov/Mail on Sunday	3 September 2010	29%	39%	16%	11%	5%
TNS-BMRB	31 August 2010	32%	42%	12%	12%	2%
Ipsos MORI	19 August 2010	34%	37%	11%	13%	4%
YouGov/SNP	18 August 2010	35%	36%	14%	12%	3%
TNS-BMRB/Herald	3 August 2010	32%	46%	10%	11%	2%
TNS-BMRB/Herald	1 June 2010	29%	45%	13%	11%	2%
YouGov/Scotsman	4 May 2010	34%	31%	14%	17%	4%
YouGov/Scotland on Sunday	30 April 2010	31%	33%	13%	18%	5%
Populus/Times	26 April 2010	31%	30%	12%	23%	4%
YouGov/Sky News	23 April 2010	34%	31%	12%	19%	5%
ARPO/Greens	19 April 2010	27%	31%	19%	19%	4%
YouGov/Scotland on Sunday	16 April 2010	30%	34%	14%	16%	5%
YouGov/Scotland on Sunday	26 March 2010	34%	31%	14%	14%	7%
YouGov/Scotland on Sunday	26 February 2010	28%	33%	16%	16%	6%
Ipsos MORI	21 February 2010	36%	29%	14%	15%	6%
TNS-BMRB/Herald	4 February 2010	35%	37%	13%	12%	3%
YouGov/SNP	13 January 2010	35%	32%	14%	13%	7%
Ipsos MORI	23 November 2009	36%	32%	12%	12%	8%
YouGov/Daily Telegraph	20 November 2009	32%	33%	14%	15%	6%
TNS-BMRB/Herald	3 November 2009	40%	32%	13%	11%	5%
YouGov/Greens	28 October 2009	34%	31%	16%	14%	5%
YouGov/SNP	2 September 2009	36%	28%	16%	14%	7%
Ipsos MORI/Holyrood Magazine	31 August 2009	38%	25%	15%	15%	6%
YouGov/Mail on Sunday	28 August 2009	34%	27%	16%	16%	6%
YouGov/Daily Mail	26 August 2009	33%	31%	16%	16%	5%
TNS-BMRB/STV	29 June 2009	39%	32%	12%	11%	7%
YouGov/Sunday Times	4 June 2009	39%	26%	14%	14%	7%
TNS System Three/Sunday Herald	28 April 2009	32%	36%	19%	9%	4%
YouGov/SNP	22 April 2009	37%	30%	15%	13%	5%
YouGov/Sunday Times	13 March 2009	35%	34%	14%	12%	4%
YouGov/Sunday Times	30 January 2009	38%	32%	13%	12%	5%
2007 Scottish Parliament election		32.9%	32.2%	16.6%	16.2%	

== Regional vote ==
=== Graphical summary ===
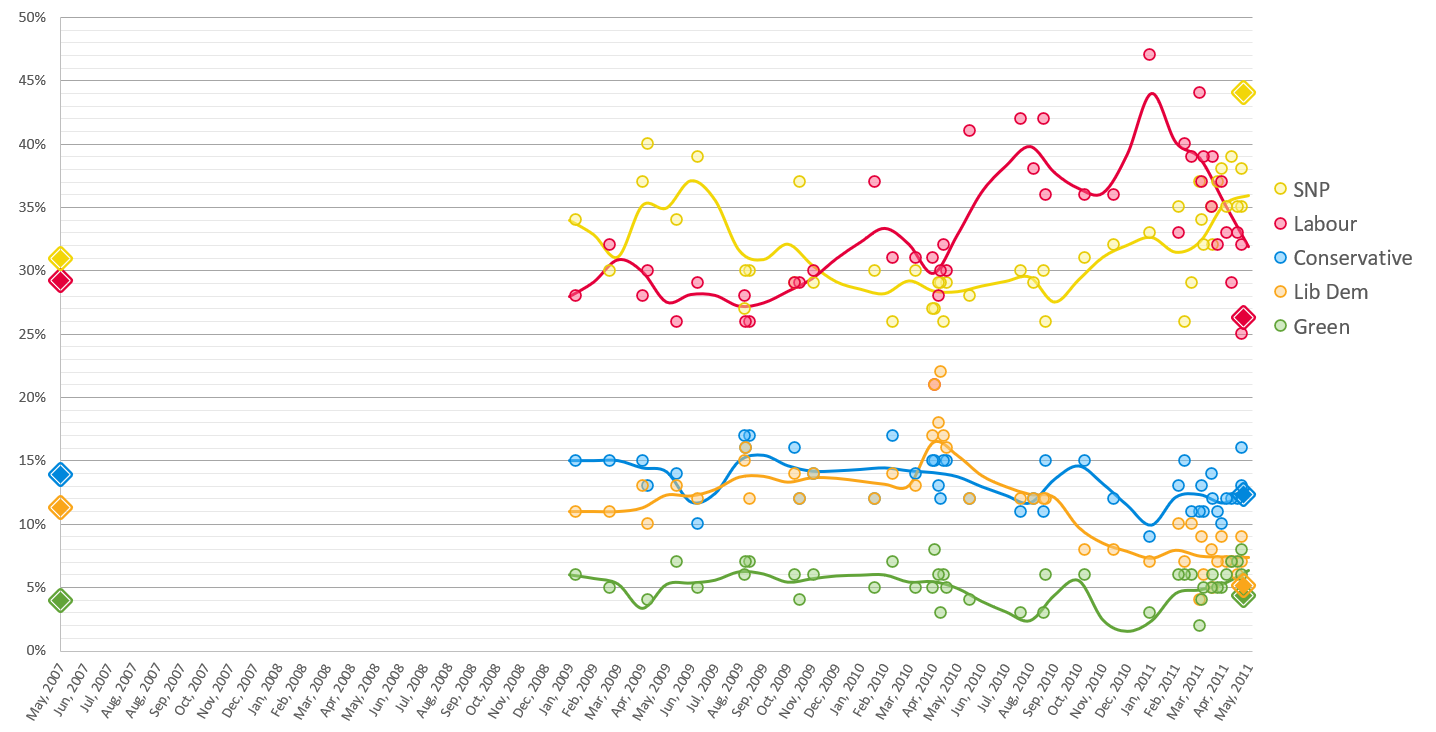

=== Poll results ===
Regional vote (AMS)
Firm/Client	Survey end date	SNP	Lab	Con	Lib Dem	Green	Others
2011 Scottish Parliament election		44.04%	26.31%	12.36%	5.2%	4.38%	
YouGov	4 May 2011	35%	32%	13%	7%	6%	3%
TNS-BMRB/STV	3 May 2011	38%	25%	16%	9%	8%	4%
YouGov/Scotland on Sunday	29 April 2011	35%	33%	12%	6%	7%	7%
YouGov/Scotland on Sunday	21 April 2011	39%	29%	12%	7%	7%	5%
YouGov/Scotland on Sunday	15 April 2011	35%	33%	12%	7%	6%	7%
Scottish Opinion/Sunday Mail	9 April 2011	38%	37%	10%	9%	5%	
panelbase/Sunday Times	4 April 2011	37%	32%	11%	7%	5%	
YouGov/Scotsman (tables)	28 March 2011	32%	39%	12%	5%	6%	6%
TNS-BMRB/STV	27 March 2011	35%	35%	14%	8%	5%	3%
YouGov	18 March 2011	32%	39%	11%	6%	5%	7%
ICM/SNP	15 March 2011	34%	37%	13%	9%	4%	7%
Scottish Opinion/Mail on Sunday	13 March 2011	37%	44%	11%	4%	2%	2%
TNS-BMRB/Herald	2 March 2011	29%	39%	11%	10%	6%	5%
YouGov/Greens	22 February 2011	26%	40%	15%	7%	6%	5%
Ipsos MORI	14 February 2011	35%	33%	13%	10%	6%	3%
TNS-BMRB/Herald	10 January 2011	33%	47%	9%	7%	3%	2%
Ipsos MORI	26 November 2010	32%	36%	12%	8%	-	10%
YouGov/Scotsman	21 October 2010	31%	36%	15%	8%	6%	4%
YouGov/Mail on Sunday	3 September 2010	26%	36%	15%	12%	6%	5%
TNS-BMRB	31 August 2010	30%	42%	11%	12%	3%	3%
Ipsos MORI	19 August 2010	29%	38%	12%	12%	-	-
TNS-BMRB/Herald	3 August 2010	30%	42%	11%	12%	3%	2%
TNS-BMRB/Herald	1 June 2010	28%	41%	12%	12%	4%	3%
YouGov/Scotsman	4 May 2010	29%	30%	15%	16%	5%	5%
YouGov/Scotland on Sunday	30 April 2010	26%	32%	15%	17%	6%	5%
Populus/Times	26 April 2010	29%	30%	12%	22%	3%	3%
YouGov/Sky News	23 April 2010	29%	28%	13%	18%	6%	6%
ARPO/Greens	19 April 2010	27%	21%	15%	21%	8%	7%
YouGov/Scotland on Sunday	16 April 2010	27%	31%	15%	17%	5%	5%
YouGov/Scotland on Sunday	26 March 2010	30%	31%	14%	13%	5%	7%
YouGov/Scotland on Sunday	26 February 2010	26%	31%	17%	14%	7%	6%
TNS-BMRB/Herald	4 February 2010	30%	37%	12%	12%	5%	3%
YouGov/Daily Telegraph	20 November 2009	29%	30%	14%	14%	6%	8%
TNS-BMRB/Herald	3 November 2009	37%	29%	12%	12%	4%	6%
YouGov/Greens	28 October 2009	29%	29%	16%	14%	6%	6%
YouGov/SNP	2 September 2009	30%	26%	17%	12%	7%	9%
YouGov/Mail on Sunday	28 August 2009	30%	26%	16%	16%	7%	5%
YouGov/Daily Mail	26 August 2009	27%	28%	17%	15%	6%	7%
TNS-BMRB/STV	29 June 2009	39%	29%	10%	12%	5%	5%
YouGov/Sunday Times	4 June 2009	34%	26%	14%	13%	7%	7%
TNS System Three/Sunday Herald	28 April 2009	40%	30%	13%	10%	4%	7%
YouGov/SNP	22 April 2009	37%	28%	15%	13%	-	7%
YouGov/Sunday Times	13 March 2009	30%	32%	15%	11%	5%	7%
YouGov/Sunday Times	30 January 2009	34%	28%	15%	11%	6%	7%
2007 Scottish Parliament election		31.0%	29.2%	13.9%	11.3%	4.0%	
