= Susan Deacon =

Scottish politician, academic (born 1964)

Susan Deacon CBE
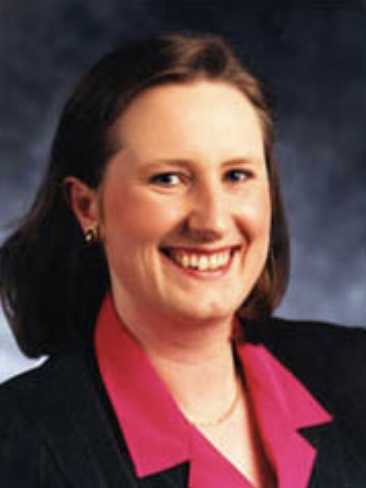
- Official portrait, 1999

Chair of the Scottish Police Authority
- In office 4 December 2017 – 5 December 2019
- Preceded by: Andrew Flanagan
- Succeeded by: David Crichton (interim)

Minister for Health and Community Care
- In office 19 May 1999 – 28 November 2001
- First Minister: Donald Dewar; Jim Wallace (acting); Henry McLeish
- Preceded by: Office established
- Succeeded by: Malcolm Chisholm

Member of the Scottish Parliament for Edinburgh East and Musselburgh
- In office 6 May 1999 – 2 April 2007
- Preceded by: Office established
- Succeeded by: Kenny MacAskill

Personal details
- Born: Susan Catherine Deacon; 2 February 1964 (age 62) Musselburgh, Scotland
- Party: Labour
- Domestic partner: John Boothman
- Children: 2
- Education: University of Edinburgh

Susan Catherine Deacon CBE (born 2 February 1964) is a Scottish business executive, advisor and former politician who served as Chair of the Scottish Police Authority from 2017 to 2019. A member of the Scottish Labour Party, she served as the first Minister for Health and Community Care in the Scottish Executive under first ministers Donald Dewar and Henry McLeish from 1999 to 2001.

She was the Member of the Scottish Parliament (MSP) for Edinburgh East & Musselburgh from 1999 to 2007. She was Assistant Principal External Relations at the University of Edinburgh from 2012 to 2018 and has been a non-executive director of several companies. She was the first female Chair of the Institute of Directors from 2015 to 18.

== Early life ==
Susan Catherine Deacon was born in Musselburgh Maternity Hospital in East Lothian on 2 February 1964. The youngest child, her parents were natives of Leith and moved to the village of Inveresk with Deacon's older brother in the early 1960s. She attended Musselburgh Grammar School where she was head girl and active in inter-schools debating. She studied at the University of Edinburgh, graduating with an MA (Hons) in Social Policy and Politics in 1987 and later an MBA in 1992. She was vice president of Edinburgh University Students' Association, and chair of Scottish Labour Students.

== Early career ==
Deacon's early career was in local government where she worked for seven years in research and management roles. After a spell in management consultancy and training in the private sector, she became director of MBA programmes at the Edinburgh Business School, at Heriot-Watt University, which included managing Scotland's first Consortium MBA programme for companies. Deacon was involved in the creation of the Business School as a new graduate school within the university.

Meanwhile, she rose through Labour ranks serving on the Scottish Labour Party's National Executive and was a founder member of the pro-devolution pressure group, Scottish Labour Action.

== Member of Scottish Parliament ==
Deacon was elected to the Scottish Parliament as MSP for Edinburgh East and Musselburgh in May 1999 and, though widely tipped for ministerial office, her appointment by First Minister Donald Dewar as Scotland’s first cabinet Minister for Health and Community Care came as a surprise to many. She had been education spokesperson in Dewar's election campaign team and had been initially rejected as a candidate by Scottish Labour's controversial vetting process, eventually becoming the only person to appeal successfully. Despite this rocky start, Deacon gained respect in the new Parliament and was regarded as one of Labour's most effective performers – and was tipped as a possible future First Minister. In 1999, she won Frontbencher of the Year in the Herald's inaugural Scottish Politician of the Year Awards, and was nominated alongside Donald Dewar and Alex Salmond for that year's Scottish Politician of the Year accolade.

Henry McLeish reappointed Deacon as Health Minister when he took over as First Minister following the death of Donald Dewar in November 2000 and she continued until McLeish’s resignation in November 2001. Deacon was offered a further Cabinet position by incoming First Minister Jack McConnell in November 2001 but, by then pregnant with her second child, decided instead to leave Government and go to the backbenches.

During her time as Health Minister, Deacon led major changes in the governance and leadership of the National Health Service in Scotland and championed reforms in child health, mental health and older people's care. She was responsible for the first Scottish Health Plan.

A critic of the flagship policy of free personal care, she argued against its introduction saying future costs were unknown and may not be sustainable – a view rejected by the Scottish Parliament. She won plaudits for her strong stance against militant anti-abortion campaigners, though was criticised by the Roman Catholic Church for her position on issues such as teenage pregnancy and contraception.

As a backbench MSP Deacon served on several Parliamentary Committees, including Enterprise and Audit. She co-founded and chaired the Cross Party Group on Sexual Health and was involved in work on reproductive health and HIV/Aids both in the UK and abroad. The only Scottish member of the RSA UK Commission on Illegal Drugs, Communities and Public Policy, Deacon was a critic of Government drugs policy and opposed the Iraq War. Deacon was re-elected as an MSP in 2003 securing the largest Labour majority in Edinburgh. Although she had been selected in 2006 to fight her seat again in the 2007 election, she later announced her decision to not seek re-election to the Scottish Parliament. Deacon said she had had enough of the ‘raw tribalism of party politics’ and that she wanted to 'move on to seek new challenges and to channel my energies in other ways.'

== Career after Parliament ==
After leaving politics, Deacon has held a portfolio of roles in higher education, business, the public and third sectors and has contributed to a range of governance and policy reviews in various areas of public life. She was Professor of Social Change at Queen Margaret University, Edinburgh from 2007–2010 and, in 2010, became an Honorary Professor in the School of Social and Political Science, at the University of Edinburgh. She was Assistant Principal External Relations at the University of Edinburgh from 2012–2018 which involved developing the university's relationships with external stakeholders and encouraging greater collaboration between academia, policymakers and business.

In 2010, Deacon was appointed by Michael Russell, MSP, Cabinet Secretary for Education and Lifelong Learning as the Scottish Government's "Early Years Champion". Her report, Joining the Dots, received widespread interest and is credited with influencing policy and investment in children's early years development and education.

Deacon became involved with the global energy group, Iberdrola, following its acquisition of ScottishPower Ltd in 2007, serving first on the company's UK Advisory Board and then as a non-executive director and Chairman of ScottishPower Renewables Ltd. She was a non-executive director of ScottishPower Ltd from 2012–2017 and from 2009 until 2014 was a trustee of Fundación Iberdrola, the Spanish group's global educational and charitable arm.

Deacon has served on a number of other boards and advisory groups, including the Traverse Theatre, Pfizer UK Foundation, the Institute of Occupational Medicine, Dewar Arts Awards Trust, and the strategic review of the National Trust for Scotland. From 2008–2012, she was founding Chairperson of the Hibernian Community Foundation – the charity set up by Hibernian Football Club and, from 2015–2018, was Chair of the Institute of Directors Scotland, the first woman to hold the position. She is a non-Executive director of Lothian Buses Ltd, Chair of the Edinburgh Festivals Forum and a Professional Fellow and Advisor with the University of Edinburgh, and serves, in a personal capacity, as a Member of the Secretary of State for Scotland's Scottish Business Task Force. She is a fellow of the RSA and in 2017 was made a Companion of the chartered Management Institute.

=== Scottish Police Authority ===
In 2017, the Scottish Government announced Deacon's appointment as Chair of the Scottish Police Authority, the national body charged with oversight of Police Scotland, the UK's second largest police service. The third person to hold the position since the creation of a unified police service for Scotland in 2012. Deacon's appointment was widely welcomed, coming as it did on the back of significant criticism of the body and its previous Chair. Deacon signalled a series of early changes in the Authority including a more transparent and outward facing approach and the appointment of a number of new Board members.

Since becoming Chair, Deacon has presided over a number of changes in the leadership of Police Scotland. The previous Chief Constable Phil Gormley resigned in February 2017 and a number of new senior officers have since been appointed to the leadership team. It is anticipated that a new Chief Constable will be announced in August 2018.

In 2019, Deacon resigned from her position as Chair of the Scottish Police Authority. She noted that "the governance and accountability arrangements for policing in Scotland are fundamentally flawed, in structure, culture and practice". She suggested that in order to resolve these problems the Scottish government needs to consider how policing is scrutinised in Scotland and if, perhaps, there needs to be a better separation of politics and policing. First Minister Nicola Sturgeon rejected Deacon's claims and said that the SPA would continue to make improvements.

== Awards and honours ==
Deacon was appointed Commander of the Order of the British Empire (CBE) in the 2017 New Year Honours for services to business, education, and public service.

== Personal life ==
Deacon lives in Prestonpans, East Lothian with her husband John Boothman and their two children.

Scottish Parliament
New parliament Scotland Act 1998	Member of the Scottish Parliament for Edinburgh East and Musselburgh; 1999–2007	Succeeded by Kenny MacAskill
New office	Minister for Health and Community Care; 1999–2001	Succeeded by Malcolm Chisholm
