= Margaret Smith (Scottish politician) =

Scottish politician (born 1961)

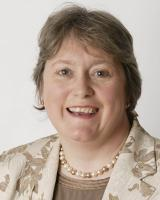
- Smith as an MSP

Member of the Scottish Parliament for Edinburgh West
- In office 6 May 1999 – 22 March 2011
- Preceded by: Constituency established
- Succeeded by: Colin Keir (Edinburgh Western)

Personal details
- Born: Margaret Joy Smith; 18 February 1961 (age 65)
- Party: Scottish Liberal Democrats
- Website: Official website

Margaret Joy Smith (born 18 February 1961) is a Scottish Liberal Democrat politician. She is the former Member of the Scottish Parliament (MSP) for the Edinburgh West constituency, a seat she held from 1999 Scottish Parliament election until 2011 Scottish Parliament election. She was the Scottish Liberal Democrats Spokesperson for Education. She was the first openly lesbian MSP.

At the 2011 election, she lost her seat to the Scottish National Party's Colin Keir who won with a majority of 2,689. As the Liberal Democrats failed to win any seats on the Lothian regional list, Smith was not returned as an MSP. Her constituency seat was however won back in 2016 by the Liberal Democrats candidate Alex Cole-Hamilton.

Scottish Parliament
New parliament Scotland Act 1998	Member of the Scottish Parliament for Edinburgh West; 1999-2011	Succeeded by Colin Keir
