= Rhona Brankin =

Scottish Labour Co-op politician

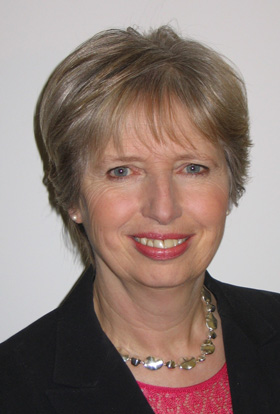

Member of the Scottish Parliament for Midlothian
- In office 6 May 1999 – 22 March 2011
- Preceded by: new constituency
- Succeeded by: constituency abolished

Personal details
- Born: 19 January 1950 (age 76) Glasgow, Scotland
- Party: Labour Co-operative
- Education: University of Aberdeen

Rhona Brankin (born 19 January 1950) is a former Scottish Labour-Co-operative politician who served as the Member of the Scottish Parliament (MSP) for the Midlothian constituency. She was first elected in 1999 and was re-elected in 2003 and 2007. She was one of six female Labour MSPs to stand down in 2011.

== Background ==
Brankin is a graduate of the University of Aberdeen and before entering the Scottish Parliament she was a teacher and a lecturer on special educational needs. She was former Chair of the Scottish Labour Party. She is married with two grown-up daughters.

In early 2000, Brankin was diagnosed with breast cancer. She had a mastectomy at St. John's Hospital in Livingston, which successfully removed the cancer.

== Scottish Parliament ==
Brankin was Deputy Minister for Culture and Sport in the Scottish Executive from 1999 to 2000 and Deputy Minister for Environment and Rural Development from 2000 to 2001. In October 2004 she was appointed Deputy Minister for Health and Community care, returning to the Environment and Rural Development portfolio in June 2005. In January 2007 she was promoted to Minister for Communities after the resignation of Malcolm Chisholm. Following Labour's defeat at the hands of the SNP at the May 2007 election, Brankin became shadow Minister for Education and Lifelong Learning. She was convener of the Public Petitions Committee from June 2010.

Prior to the 2011 elections, Brankin announced her decision not to stand for re-election, retiring from Holyrood after 12 years. The Midlothian constituency underwent boundary changes, and the two new constituencies created, Midlothian North and Musselburgh, and Midlothian South, Tweeddale and Lauderdale, were won by the SNP.

Scottish Parliament
New parliament Scotland Act 1998	Member of the Scottish Parliament for Midlothian; 1999–2011	Constituency abolished
Political offices
Preceded by Malcolm Chisholm	Minister for Communities; 2007	Succeeded by Stewart Maxwell as Minister for Communities and Sport
Preceded by Lewis Macdonald	Deputy Minister for the Environment and Rural Development; 2005–2007	Succeeded by Sarah Boyack
Preceded by Tom McCabe	Deputy Minister for Health and Community Care; 2004–2005	Succeeded by Lewis Macdonald
Preceded by John Home Robertson	Deputy Minister for Environment and Rural Development; 2000–2001	Succeeded by Allan Wilson
New office	Deputy Minister for Culture and Sport; 1999–2000	Succeeded by Allan Wilson
