= Malcolm Chisholm =

Scottish Labour politician

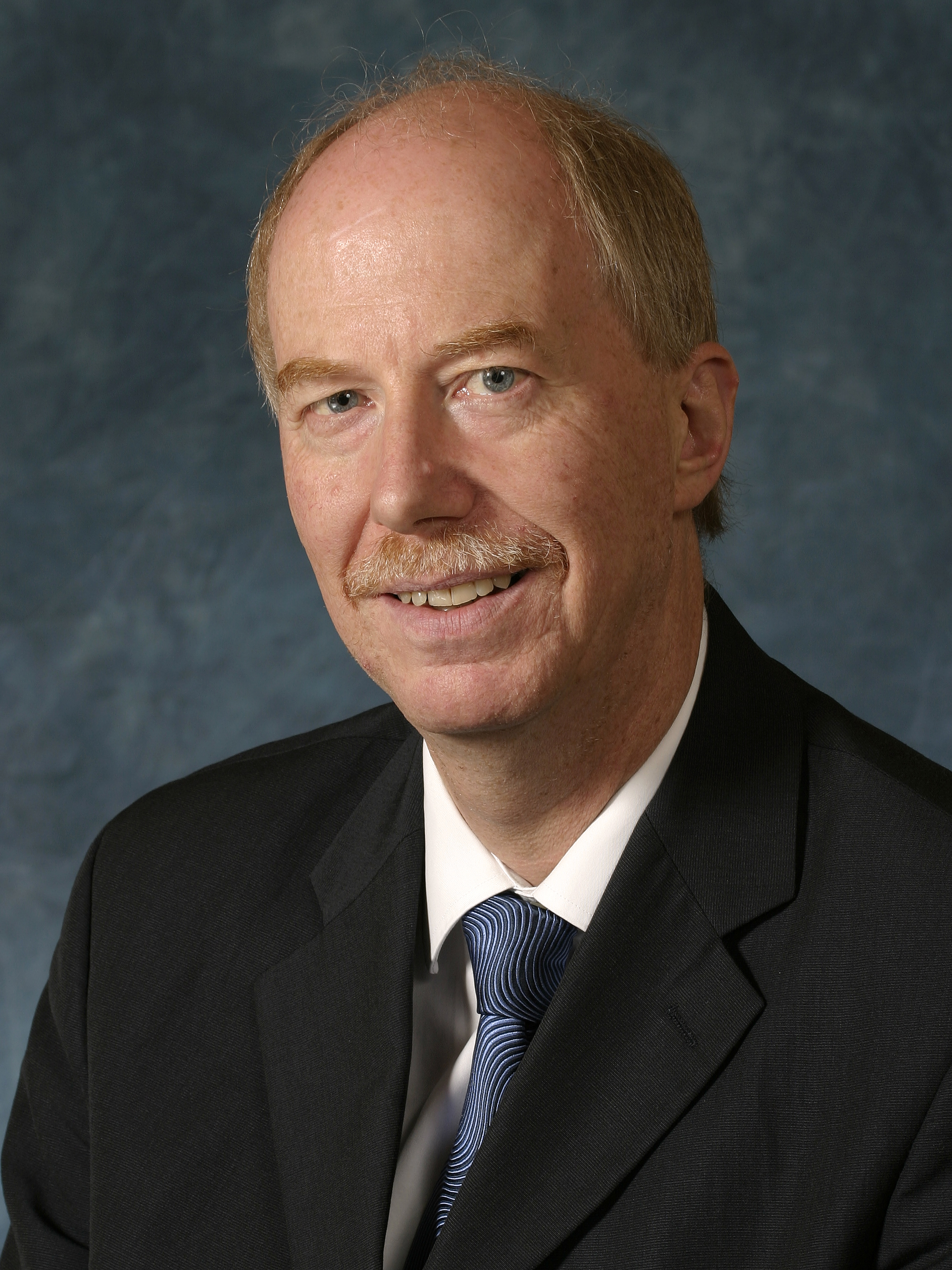
- Official portrait, 2003

Parliamentary Under-Secretary of State for Scotland
- In office 6 May 1997 – 10 December 1997
- Prime Minister: Tony Blair
- Preceded by: Raymond Robertson
- Succeeded by: Calum MacDonald

Member of the Scottish Parliament for Edinburgh Northern and Leith Edinburgh North and Leith (1999–2011)
- In office 6 May 1999 – 24 March 2016
- Preceded by: Constituency established
- Succeeded by: Ben Macpherson

Member of Parliament for Edinburgh North and Leith Edinburgh Leith (1992–1997)
- In office 9 April 1992 – 14 May 2001
- Preceded by: Ron Brown
- Succeeded by: Mark Lazarowicz

Personal details
- Born: 7 March 1949 (age 77) Edinburgh, Scotland
- Party: Scottish Labour Party
- Education: University of Edinburgh

Malcolm George Richardson Chisholm (born 7 March 1949) is a former Scottish politician who served as Minister for Health and Community Care from 2001 to 2004 and Minister for Communities from 2004 to 2006. A member of the Scottish Labour Party, he was Member of Parliament (MP) for Edinburgh North and Leith, formerly Edinburgh Leith, from 1992 to 2001 and Member of the Scottish Parliament (MSP) for the equivalent seat and its successor from 1999 to 2016.

== Career ==
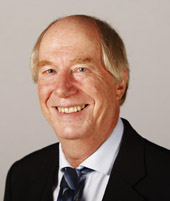
Official parliamentary portrait, 2011

Chisholm was Member of Parliament for Edinburgh Leith from 1992, then Edinburgh North and Leith from 1997. He served as a Parliamentary Under-Secretary of State for Scotland responsible for local government and transport minister for a few months in 1997; but resigned over single parent benefit cuts. He remained an MP until 2001, when he stood down from the House of Commons in order to concentrate on the Scottish Parliament, to which he was elected in 1999 for the same constituency.

Chisholm became Minister for Health and Community Care in 2001, then Minister for Communities from October 2004. As Minister for Health and Community Care, he introduced and oversaw the passage of the National Health Service Reform (Scotland) Bill which brought about the abolition of NHS Trusts in Scotland and the creation of Community Health Partnerships.

As Minister for Communities, Chisholm oversaw investment in the building of affordable homes, approved a proposal from Fife Council for a moratorium on council house sales in order to maintain the supply of affordable housing, developed reforms of planning policy to protect green spaces, and extended the Central Heating Programme and Warm Deal to provide and refurbish heating systems for pensioners.

In December 2006, Chisholm criticised the decision to renew Britain's Trident nuclear deterrent, in opposition to First Minister Jack McConnell, leading to speculation that Chisholm might be removed from office. He subsequently resigned on 21 December 2006 after supporting a motion passed by the Scottish National Party that opposed the replacement of the nuclear submarines.

On 17 September 2007, Chisholm was appointed Shadow Minister for Culture and External Affairs by new Scottish Labour leader, Wendy Alexander. In September 2008, Chisholm returned to the backbenches.

In April 2014, Chrisholm announced that he would not seek re-election at the 2016 election.

Parliament of the United Kingdom
| Preceded by Ron Brown | Member of Parliament for Edinburgh Leith; 1992–1997 | Constituency abolished |
| New constituency | Member of Parliament for Edinburgh North and Leith; 1997–2001 | Succeeded by Mark Lazarowicz |
Scottish Parliament
| New parliament Scotland Act 1998 | Member of the Scottish Parliament for Edinburgh North and Leith; 1999–2016 | Succeeded by Ben Macpherson |
Political offices
| Preceded by Margaret Curran | Minister for Communities; 2004–2006 | Succeeded by Rhona Brankin |
| Preceded by Susan Deacon | Minister for Health and Community Care; 2001–2004 | Succeeded by Andy Kerr |
| Preceded by Iain Gray | Deputy Minister for Health and Community Care; 2000–2001 | Succeeded by Hugh Henry and Mary Mulligan |
