= Ian McKee =

UK politician (born 1940)

Member of the Scottish Parliament for Lothians (1 of 7 Regional MSPs)
- In office 3 May 2007 – 22 March 2011

Personal details
- Party: Scottish National Party

Ian McKee (born 1940) is an English-born Scottish National Party politician. He was a Member of the Scottish Parliament (MSP) for the Lothians region from 2007 to 2011.

== Early life ==
Born in South Shields, England, McKee was educated at Fettes College in Edinburgh and at the University of Edinburgh. He then became a hospital doctor in the National Health Service, before becoming a Medical Officer in the Royal Air Force (RAF) from 1966 to 1971. He worked as a general practitioner in a medical practice in Wester Hailes, Edinburgh. He formerly wrote a column in The Scotsman newspaper.

== Political career ==
McKee was elected during the 2007 election for the Lothians region.

In 2010, at the age of 70, he announced that he would not be standing for re-election.
