= Livingston (Scottish Parliament constituency) =

Scottish Parliament constituency

Coordinates: 55.894°N 3.517°W

- Former county constituency for the Scottish Parliament
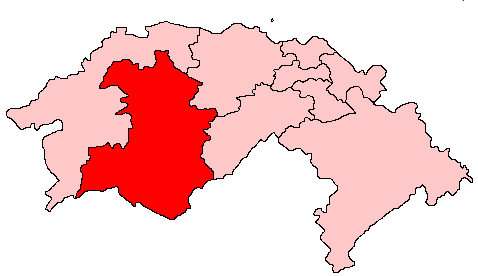

- Livingston shown within the Lothians electoral region and the region shown within Scotland

Former constituency
- Created: 1999
- Abolished: 2011
- Council area: West Lothian

Livingston was a constituency of the Scottish Parliament (Holyrood). It elected one Member of the Scottish Parliament (MSP) by the plurality (first past the post) method of election.

For the 2011 Scottish Parliament election, Livingston was expanded and renamed Almond Valley

== Electoral region ==
See also Lothians (Scottish Parliament electoral region)

== Constituency boundaries and council area ==
The Livingston constituency was created at the same time as the Scottish Parliament, in 1999, with the name and boundaries of an existing Westminster constituency. In 2005, however, Scottish Westminster (House of Commons) constituencies were mostly replaced with new constituencies.

== Boundary review ==
See Scottish Parliament constituencies and regions from 2011

Following their First Periodic review of constituencies to the Scottish Parliament in time for the 2011 elections, the Boundary Commission for Scotland recommended alterations to the Livingston and Linlithgow constituencies. Livingston was effectively abolished, being replaced by a newly formed Almond Valley seat. This constituency took in the Livingston, East Calder, Fauldhouse, Breich Valley, and Seafield areas. A newly shaped Linlithgow constituency was formed from the Linlithgow, Broxburn, Blackburn, Whitburn, and Armadale areas.

== Member of the Scottish Parliament ==
Election	Member	Party
1999	Bristow Muldoon	Labour
2007	Angela Constance	Scottish National Party
2011	Constituency abolished; see Almond Valley	

== Election results ==
2007 Scottish Parliament election: Livingston
Party	Candidate	Votes	%	±%
SNP	Angela Constance	13,159	39.6	+8.0
Labour	Bristow Muldoon	12,289	37.0	−6.6
Action to Save St John's Hospital	Ernie Walker	2,814	8.5	New
Conservative	David Brown	2,804	8.4	−0.9
Liberal Democrats	Evan Bell	2,158	6.5	−2.4
Majority		870	2.6	N/A
Turnout		33,224	50.0	+3.3
SNP gain from Labour		Swing		

Scottish Parliament Election 2003: Livingston
Party	Candidate	Votes	%	±%
Labour	Bristow Muldoon	13,327	43.6	−3.7
SNP	Peter Johnston	9,657	31.6	−5.1
Conservative	Lindsay Paterson	2,848	9.3	+1.1
Liberal Democrats	Paul McGreal	2,714	8.9	+1.2
Scottish Socialist	Robert Richard	1,640	5.4	New
Scottish People's	Stephen Milburn	371	1.2	New
Majority		3,670	12.0	+1.3
Turnout		30,557	46.7	
Labour hold		Swing	+0.7	

Scottish Parliament Election 1999: Livingston
Party	Candidate	Votes	%	±%
Labour	Bristow Muldoon	17,313	47.34	N/A
SNP	Greg McCarra	13,409	36.67	N/A
Conservative	Douglas Younger	3,014	8.24	N/A
Liberal Democrats	Martin Oliver	2,834	7.75	N/A
Majority		3,904	10.67	N/A
Turnout		36,570		
Labour win (new seat)				
