= Edinburgh Central (Scottish Parliament constituency) =

Burgh constituency of the Scottish Parliament

- Burgh constituency for the Scottish Parliament
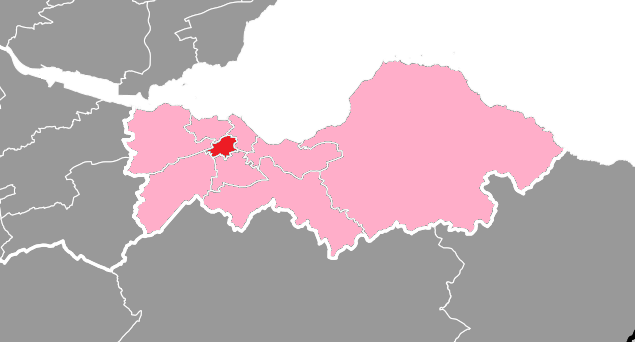

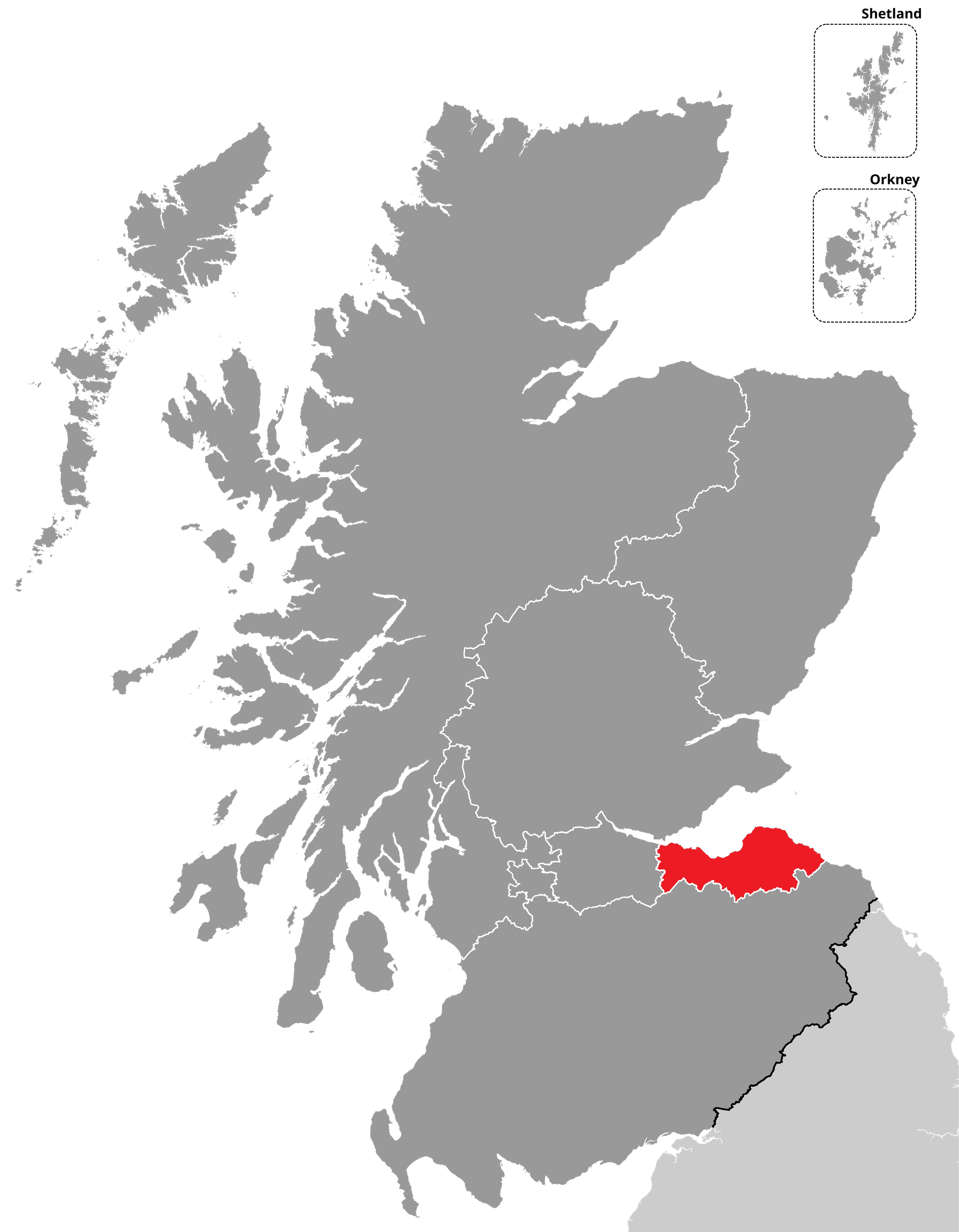
- Edinburgh Central shown within the Edinburgh and Lothians East electoral region, and the region shown within Scotland
- Electoral region: Edinburgh and Lothians East
- Electorate: 64,614 (2026)

Current constituency
- Created: 1999
- Party: Scottish Greens
- MSP: Lorna Slater
- Council area: City of Edinburgh

Edinburgh Central (Gaelic: Dùn Èideann Meadhain) is a burgh constituency of the Scottish Parliament covering part of the council area of Edinburgh. It elects one Member of the Scottish Parliament (MSP) by the plurality (first past the post) method of election. Under the additional-member electoral system used for elections to the Scottish Parliament, it is also one of nine constituencies in the Edinburgh and Lothians East electoral region, which elects seven additional members, in addition to the nine constituency MSPs, to produce a form of proportional representation for the region as a whole.

The constituency was created with the name and boundaries of the Edinburgh Central UK Parliament constituency. Since 1999, the constituency MSP has been an ex officio member of the board of trustees of the National Library of Scotland. From 1925 until 1999, that role had been taken by the Member of Parliament (MP) for the Westminster constituency. It was one of the few areas to vote "Yes" in the 2011 UK Alternative Vote referendum held on the same day as the 2011 Scottish Parliament election.

The seat has been held by Lorna Slater of the Scottish Greens since the 2026 Scottish Parliament election.

== Electoral region ==
The other eight constituencies of the Edinburgh and Lothians East region are East Lothian Coast and Lammermuirs, Edinburgh Eastern, Musselburgh and Tranent, Edinburgh North Eastern and Leith, Edinburgh North Western, Edinburgh Northern, Edinburgh Southern, Edinburgh South Western and Midlothian North. The region includes all of the City of Edinburgh and East Lothian council areas, and parts of the Midlothian council area.

Prior to second periodic review of Scottish Parliament boundaries in 2025, the constituency was one of nine in the Lothians electoral region. The other eight constituencies of the Lothian region were Almond Valley, Edinburgh Eastern, Edinburgh Northern and Leith, Edinburgh Pentlands, Edinburgh Southern, Edinburgh Western, Linlithgow and Midlothian North and Musselburgh. The region included all of the City of Edinburgh council area, parts of the East Lothian council area, parts of the Midlothian council area and all of the West Lothian council area.

== Constituency boundaries and council area ==
Map of boundaries between 2011-2025

Edinburgh is represented in the Scottish Parliament by seven constituencies: Edinburgh Eastern, Musselburgh and Tranent (which also includes part of East Lothian), Edinburgh Central, Edinburgh North Eastern and Leith, Edinburgh North Western, Edinburgh Northern, Edinburgh Southern, and Edinburgh South Western. Following the second periodic review of Scottish Parliament boundaries in 2025, the Edinburgh Central constituency covers the following electoral wards of Edinburgh Council:

- Sighthill/Gorgie (shared with Edinburgh South Western);
- Fountainbridge/Craiglockhart (shared with Edinburgh South Western);
- Morningside (shared with Edinburgh Southern);
- City Centre (entire ward);
- Southside/Newington (shared with Edinburgh Southern).

=== History ===
The Edinburgh Central constituency was created at the same time as the Scottish Parliament, in 1999, with the name and boundaries of an existing Westminster constituency. In 2005, however, Scottish Westminster (House of Commons) constituencies were mostly replaced with new constituencies.

As part of the First Periodic Review of Scottish Parliament Boundaries the boundaries of the constituency were changed ahead of the 2011 Scottish Parliament election. Each electoral ward used in the creation of the redrawn Central was split, being shared with neighbouring constituencies.

- Inverleith (shared with Edinburgh Northern and Leith and Edinburgh Western)
- Corstorphine/Murrayfield (shared with Edinburgh Western)
- Sighthill/Gorgie (shared with Edinburgh Pentlands and Edinburgh Southern)
- Fountainbridge/Craiglockhart (shared with Edinburgh Southern)
- Morningside (shared with Edinburgh Southern)
- City Centre (shared with Edinburgh Eastern)
- Southside/Newington (shared with Southern)

The second periodic review of Scottish Parliament boundaries in 2025 led to further boundary changes, resulting in the current constituency, which was first contested at the 2026 Scottish Parliament election.

== Constituency profile and voting patterns ==
=== Constituency profile ===
The Edinburgh Central constituency is situated in the central-north of the City of Edinburgh. The constituency is a major tourist, financial and retail centre, covering Edinburgh's Old and New Towns, Princes Street, Haymarket, Edinburgh Castle, Holyrood Castle and the Scottish Parliament building itself.

The north and west of the constituency is very affluent, covering Victorian suburbs such as Craigleith, Murrayfield, Stockbridge and Orchard Brae, in addition to Edinburgh's well-off West End. There is some deprivation towards the south and east of the constituency around Dalry, Dumbiedykes and in patches of Edinburgh's Old Town, although overall the constituency is very affluent.

=== Voting patterns ===
In the 2007 City of Edinburgh local council election, the Liberal Democrats emerged as the largest party in wards covered by the Edinburgh Central constituency. In the 2012 local election, the Conservatives and Scottish National Party formed the two largest parties in the area. The Conservatives were ahead in 6 of the 8 electoral wards covering the Edinburgh Central constituency in the 2017 City of Edinburgh local council election.

Traditionally this constituency has been represented by the Labour Party, with the Liberal Democrats forming the main opposition. From the formation of the Scottish Parliament in 1999 until the 2011 Scottish Parliament election, the constituency of Edinburgh Central was represented by Labour's Sarah Boyack. With a re-arrangement of the constituency boundaries in 2011, which would have been won by the Liberal Democrats in 2007, the constituency narrowly returned the SNP's Marco Biagi, who gained the constituency with a slender majority of 237 votes. In 2016 the Leader of the Scottish Conservative Party, Ruth Davidson, gained the constituency from the SNP with a majority of 610 votes. No candidate has ever won over 40% of the vote in the constituency since its establishment.

In the UK Parliament, the Edinburgh Central constituency was represented by the Labour Party almost continuously from the 1945 UK general election until the constituency was abolished in 2005, voting Conservative once in 1983.

== Member of the Scottish Parliament ==
| Election | Member | Party |
|---|---|---|
| 1999 | Sarah Boyack | Labour |
| 2011 | Marco Biagi | SNP |
| 2016 | Ruth Davidson | Conservatives |
| 2021 | Angus Robertson | SNP |
| 2026 | Lorna Slater | Green |

== Election results ==
=== 2020s ===
2026 Scottish Parliament election: Edinburgh Central
| Party | Candidate | Constituency | | | Regional | | |
| Party | Candidate | Votes | % | ±% | Votes | % | ±% |
|---|---|---|---|---|---|---|---|
| Green | Lorna Slater (Note: Incumbent member on the party list, or for another constituency) | 12,680 | 36.0 | ▲29.3 | 13,244 | 37.6 | ▲13.4 |
| Labour | James Dalgleish | 8,098 | 23.0 | ▼5.5 | 6,340 | 18.0 | ▼2.9 |
| SNP | Angus Robertson (Note: Incumbent member for this constituency) | 7,702 | 21.9 | ▼17.3 | 6,092 | 17.3 | ▼11.8 |
| Conservative | Jo Mowat | 2,262 | 6.4 | ▼13.7 | 2,631 | 7.5 | ▼9.5 |
| Liberal Democrats | Charles Dundas | 2,168 | 6.2 | ▲1.9 | 3,126 | 8.9 | ▲4.3 |
| Reform | Gary Neill | 1,876 | 5.3 | New | 2,175 | 6.2 | ▲6.0 |
| Independent | Robert Pownall | 41 | 0.1 | New | | | |
| Independent | Chris Creighton | 32 | 0.1 | New | | | |
| Independent Green Voice | | | | | 221 | 0.6 | New |
| Independent | Ash Regan (Note: Regan was the incumbent member for the Edinburgh Eastern constituency, having initially been elected as a member of the SNP) | | | | 199 | 0.6 | New |
| Animal Welfare | | | | | 167 | 0.5 | ▲0.1 |
| Scottish Socialist | | | | | 160 | 0.5 | New |
| AtLS | Craig Murray | 150 | 0.4 | New | 158 | 0.4 | New |
| Scottish Family | | | | | 143 | 0.4 | 0.0 |
| Independent | Jeremy Balfour (Note: Balfour was an incumbent member on the regional list, having initially been elected as a member of the Conservatives) | | | | 138 | 0.4 | New |
| Communist | | | | | 117 | 0.3 | ▲0.1 |
| Independent | Bob Bonnie Prince | 176 | 0.5 | ▼0.4 | 82 | 0.2 | New |
| Edinburgh & East Lothian People | | | | | 75 | 0.2 | New |
| ISP | | | | | 56 | 0.2 | New |
| Scottish Libertarian | Tam Laird | 56 | 0.2 | ▼0.1 | 39 | 0.1 | ▼0.1 |
| Workers Party | | | | | 35 | 0.1 | New |
| Equality | | | | | 32 | 0.1 | New |
| Advance UK | | | | | 29 | 0.1 | New |
| Independent | Morgwn Davies | | | | 3 | 0.0 | New |
| Majority | | 4,582 | 13.0 | N/A | | | |
| Valid votes | | 35,241 | | | 35,262 | | |
| Invalid votes | | 109 | | | 0 | | |
| Turnout | | 35,350 | 54.71 | ▼5.2 | 35,262 | 54.57 | ▼5.3 |
| Green gain from SNP | | Swing | | ▲23.3 | | | |
Notes

2021 notional result: Edinburgh Central (Note: Estimate of the 2021 Scottish Parliament election result as if the revised boundaries recommended under the 2025 boundary review were in place)
| Party | Candidate | Constituency | | | Regional | | |
| Party | Candidate | Votes | % | ±% | Votes | % | ±% |
|---|---|---|---|---|---|---|---|
| SNP | Angus Robertson | 16,652 | 41.2 | N/A | 11,792 | 29.1 | N/A |
| Labour | Maddy Kirkman | 12,390 | 30.6 | N/A | 8,465 | 20.9 | N/A |
| Conservative | Scott Douglas | 6,761 | 16.7 | N/A | 6,885 | 17.0 | N/A |
| Green | Alison Johnstone (Note: Incumbent member on the party list, or for another constituency) | 2,765 | 6.8 | N/A | 9,804 | 24.2 | N/A |
| Liberal Democrats | Bruce Wilson | 1,431 | 3.5 | N/A | 1,851 | 4.6 | N/A |
| Alba | | | | | 589 | 1.5 | N/A |
| Other | N/A | 443 | 1.1 | N/A | 1,189 | 2.9 | N/A |
| Majority | | 4,262 | 10.5 | N/A | | | |
| Valid votes | | 40,442 | | | 40,575 | | |
| SNP win (new boundaries) | | | | | | | |
Notes

2021 Scottish Parliament election: Edinburgh Central
| Party | Candidate | Constituency | | | Regional | | |
| Party | Candidate | Votes | % | ±% | Votes | % | ±% |
|---|---|---|---|---|---|---|---|
| SNP | Angus Robertson | 16,276 | 39.0 | ▲10.4 | 12,476 | 29.9 | ▲3.7 |
| Conservative | Scott Douglas | 11,544 | 27.7 | ▼2.7 | 9,766 | 23.4 | ▼5.7 |
| Labour | Maddy Kirkman | 6,839 | 16.4 | ▼5.7 | 6,866 | 16.4 | ▼0.8 |
| Green | Alison Johnstone (Note: Incumbent member on the party list, or for another constituency) | 3,921 | 9.4 | ▼4.2 | 7,604 | 18.2 | ▲1.2 |
| Liberal Democrats | Bruce Wilson | 2,555 | 6.1 | ▲1.2 | 3,075 | 7.4 | ▲1.4 |
| Independent | Bonnie Prince Bob | 363 | 0.9 | New | | | |
| Alba | | | | | 639 | 1.5 | New |
| All for Unity | | | | | 279 | 0.7 | New |
| Animal Welfare | | | | | 179 | 0.4 | New |
| Women's Equality | | | | | 161 | 0.4 | ▼1.8 |
| Scottish Family | | | | | 154 | 0.4 | New |
| Freedom Alliance (UK) | | | | | 102 | 0.2 | New |
| Scottish Libertarian | Tam Laird | 137 | 0.3 | 0.0 | 93 | 0.2 | New |
| Communist | | | | | 90 | 0.2 | New |
| Reform | | | | | 88 | 0.2 | New |
| Independent | Ashley Graczyk | | | | 75 | 0.2 | New |
| Abolish the Scottish Parliament | | | | | 48 | 0.1 | New |
| SDP | | | | | 33 | 0.1 | New |
| UKIP | Donald Mackay | 78 | 0.2 | New | 30 | 0.1 | ▼1.1 |
| Renew | | | | | 18 | 0.0 | New |
| Majority | | 4,732 | 11.3 | N/A | | | |
| Valid votes | | 41,713 | | | 41,776 | | |
| Invalid votes | | 121 | | | 59 | | |
| Turnout | | 41,834 | 62.7 | ▲5.2 | 41,835 | 62.7 | ▲5.2 |
| SNP gain from Conservative | | Swing | | ▲6.6 | | | |

=== 2010s ===
2016 Scottish Parliament election: Edinburgh Central
| Party | Candidate | Constituency | | | Regional | | |
| Party | Candidate | Votes | % | ±% | Votes | % | ±% |
|---|---|---|---|---|---|---|---|
| Conservative | Ruth Davidson (Note: Incumbent member on the party list, or for another constituency) | 10,399 | 30.4 | ▲15.4 | 9,946 | 29.1 | ▲13.2 |
| SNP | Alison Dickie | 9,789 | 28.6 | ▼4.1 | 8,962 | 26.2 | ▼3.8 |
| Labour | Sarah Boyack | 7,546 | 22.1 | ▼9.8 | 5,899 | 17.3 | ▼2.3 |
| Green | Alison Johnstone (Note: Elected on the party list) | 4,644 | 13.6 | New | 5,799 | 17.0 | ▲2.6 |
| Liberal Democrats | Hannah Bettsworth | 1,672 | 4.9 | ▼15.6 | 2,048 | 6.0 | ▼3.7 |
| Women's Equality Party (United Kingdom) | | | | | 743 | 2.2 | New |
| UKIP | | | | | 395 | 1.2 | ▲0.6 |
| RISE | | | | | 284 | 0.8 | New |
| Scottish Libertarian | Tom Laird | 119 | 0.3 | New | | | |
| Solidarity | | | | | 90 | 0.3 | ▲0.1 |
| Majority | | 610 | 1.8 | N/A | | | |
| Valid votes | | 34,169 | | | 34,166 | | |
| Invalid votes | | 107 | | | 68 | | |
| Turnout | | 34,276 | 57.5 | ▲3.0 | 34,234 | 57.5 | ▲2.8 |
| Conservative gain from SNP | | Swing | | ▲9.8 | | | |
Notes

2011 Scottish Parliament election: Edinburgh Central
| Party | Candidate | Constituency | | | Region | | |
| Party | Candidate | Votes | % | ±% | Votes | % | ±% |
|---|---|---|---|---|---|---|---|
| SNP | Marco Biagi | 9,480 | 32.7 | N/A | 8,768 | 30.0 | N/A |
| Labour | Sarah Boyack (Note: Incumbent member for this constituency) | 9,243 | 31.9 | N/A | 5,716 | 19.6 | N/A |
| Liberal Democrats | Alex Cole-Hamilton | 5,937 | 20.5 | N/A | 2,849 | 9.7 | N/A |
| Conservative | Iain McGill | 4,354 | 15.0 | N/A | 4,659 | 15.9 | N/A |
| Green | | | | | 4,213 | 14.4 | N/A |
| Independent | Margo MacDonald (Note: Incumbent member on the party list, or for another constituency) | | | | 1,988 | 6.8 | N/A |
| All-Scotland Pensioners Party | | | | | 236 | 0.8 | N/A |
| UKIP | | | | | 182 | 0.6 | N/A |
| Scottish Socialist | | | | | 145 | 0.5 | N/A |
| Socialist Labour | | | | | 105 | 0.4 | N/A |
| BNP | | | | | 97 | 0.3 | N/A |
| Liberal | | | | | 71 | 0.2 | N/A |
| Scottish Christian | | | | | 68 | 0.2 | N/A |
| CPA | | | | | 44 | 0.2 | N/A |
| Solidarity | | | | | 46 | 0.2 | N/A |
| Independent | Ken O'Neil | | | | 24 | 0.1 | N/A |
| Independent | David Hogg | | | | 14 | 0.0 | N/A |
| Independent | Mev Brown | | | | 5 | 0.0 | N/A |
| Majority | | 237 | 0.8 | N/A | | | |
| Valid votes | | 29,014 | | | 29,230 | | |
| Invalid votes | | 224 | | | 90 | | |
| Turnout | | 29,238 | 54.5 | N/A | 29,320 | 54.7 | N/A |
| SNP win (new boundaries) | | | | | | | |

=== 2000s ===
2007 Scottish Parliament election: Edinburgh Central
| Party | Candidate | Votes | % | ±% |
|---|---|---|---|---|
| Labour | Sarah Boyack | 9,155 | 31.1 | −1.3 |
| Liberal Democrats | Siobhan Mathers | 7,962 | 27.1 | +4.2 |
| SNP | Shirley-Anne Somerville | 7,496 | 25.5 | +7.8 |
| Conservative | Fiona Houston | 4,783 | 16.3 | −0.8 |
| Majority | | 1,193 | 4.0 | −5.5 |
| Turnout | | 29,396 | 52.9 | +6.8 |
| Labour hold | | Swing | -2.8 | |

2003 Scottish Parliament election: Edinburgh Central
| Party | Candidate | Votes | % | ±% |
|---|---|---|---|---|
| Labour | Sarah Boyack | 9,066 | 32.4 | −5.6 |
| Liberal Democrats | Andy Myles | 6,400 | 22.9 | +6.3 |
| SNP | Kevin Pringle | 4,965 | 17.7 | −8.0 |
| Conservative | Peter Finnie | 4,802 | 17.1 | +1.0 |
| Scottish Socialist | Catriona Grant | 2,552 | 9.1 | +6.9 |
| Scottish People's | James O'Neill | 229 | 0.8 | New |
| Majority | | 2,666 | 9.5 | −2.9 |
| Turnout | | 28,014 | 46.1 | −10.6 |
| Labour hold | | Swing | -6.0 | |

=== 1990s ===
1999 Scottish Parliament election: Edinburgh Central
| Party | Candidate | Votes | % |
|---|---|---|---|
| Labour | Sarah Boyack | 14,224 | 38.0 |
| SNP | Ian McKee | 9,598 | 25.7 |
| Liberal Democrats | Andy Myles | 6,187 | 16.5 |
| Conservative | Jacqui Low | 6,018 | 16.1 |
| Scottish Socialist | Kevin Williamson | 830 | 2.2 |
| Majority | | 4,626 | 12.4 |
| Turnout | | 36,857 | 56.7 |
| Labour win (new seat) | | | |

== See also ==
- Politics of Edinburgh

== Footnotes ==
=== Bibliography ===
- "Second Review of Scottish Parliament Boundaries: Report to Scottish Ministers" (PDF). Boundaries Scotland. April 2025.
