= Adam McGibbon =

Northern Irish environmentalist

Adam McGibbon is a Northern Irish environmentalist and writer.

== Early life and education ==
McGibbon was born in Belfast in 1988 and attended Lagan College, Northern Ireland’s first integrated school, and Queen’s University Belfast.

He was a two-term Vice President of Queen’s University Belfast Students’ Union and member of the Regional Executive of the National Union of Students – Union of Students in Ireland. He was a leader in the 2010-11 student campaign that stopped tuition fee increases at Northern Irish universities. As of 2020, this campaign had saved Northern Ireland university students £1 billion in tuition fees compared to English students.

== Green Party ==
McGibbon joined the Green Party in Northern Ireland at university, founding the party's youth wing at Queen's University Belfast, and the South Belfast branch of the party. He was the party’s candidate in Belfast South in the 2010 United Kingdom General Election, and was the youngest candidate in Northern Ireland at that election. The Greens' Clare Bailey later won the corresponding Northern Ireland Assembly seat.

After graduating, McGibbon worked as an election campaign manager for the Green Party of England & Wales, managing Caroline Lucas’ re-election campaign in Brighton Pavilion in the 2015 United Kingdom General Election. Lucas’ majority increased substantially. McGibbon later ran Sian Berry’s campaign in the 2016 London Mayoral election, which achieved a then-record vote for the Greens and elected two London Assembly members. He also managed Caroline Lucas and Jonathan Bartley’s successful bid to be Co-Leaders of the Green Party in the 2016 Green Party of England and Wales leadership election.

McGibbon ran the Scottish Greens' campaign in Edinburgh for the 2026 Scottish Parliament election, where Lorna Slater won the Greens' first ever Scottish Parliament constituency seat in Edinburgh Central. In a result seen as the biggest shock of the election, Slater unseated Scottish National Party minister Angus Robertson. The Greens also elected a record 3 Green MSPs on the Edinburgh and Lothians East regional list - Kate Nevens, Q Manivannan and Kayleigh Kinross-O'Neill.

== Activism ==
While working for Global Witness, McGibbon led a coalition of organisations that forced Prime Minister Boris Johnson to end the UK's multi-billion taxpayer finance for fossil fuel projects overseas in December 2020. The UK was the first country in the world to make the move. The campaign won the ‘David and Goliath Award’ from the Sheila McKechnie Foundation. By the 2021 United Nations Climate Change Conference in Glasgow, the campaign had produced a "domino effect," pushing 25 other countries, including the United States and Canada, to join the UK in phasing out public finance for overseas fossil fuel projects.

McGibbon was the inaugural winner of the Spirit of Northern Ireland ‘Climate Hero’ award in 2021.

== Writing & media ==
McGibbon has written for The Guardian, The Independent, The Nation, The New Statesman, Reader’s Digest, The Times and others on politics, the environment and Northern Irish affairs.
