= List of Scottish Green members of the Scottish Parliament =

This is a list of Scottish Green Party MSPs. It includes all members of the Scottish Parliament (MSPs) who represented the Scottish Greens in the Scottish Parliament.

== List of MSPs ==
Name	Constituency or region	Type	Start year	End year
Shiona Baird	North East Scotland	Region	2003	2007
Chris Ballance	South of Scotland	Region	2003	2007
Mark Ballard	Lothians	Region	2003	2007
Holly Bruce	Glasgow Southside	Constituency	2026	
Ariane Burgess	Highlands and Islands	Region	2021	
Maggie Chapman	North East Scotland	Region	2021	
Iris Duane	Glasgow	Region	2026	
John Finnie	Highlands and Islands	Region	2016	2021
Ross Greer	West Scotland	Region	2016	
Robin Harper	Lothians	Region	1999	2011
Patrick Harvie	Glasgow	Region	2003	
Alison Johnstone (Note: In May 2021, Alison Johnstone was elected as Presiding Officer of the Scottish Parliament. As is customary, she suspended her party membership of the Scottish Greens, and didn't stand for re-election in the 2026 Scottish Parliament Election)	Lothian	Region	2011	2021
Kayleigh Kinross-O'Neill	Edinburgh and Lothians East	Region	2026	
Gillian Mackay	Central Scotland	Region	2021	
Q Manivannan	Edinburgh and Lothians East	Region	2026	
Cara McKee	West Scotland	Region	2026	
Laura Moodie	South Scotland	Region	2026	
Kate Nevens	Edinburgh and Lothians East	Region	2026	
Mark Ruskell	Mid Scotland and Fife	Region	2003	2007
Mark Ruskell	Mid Scotland and Fife	Region	2016	
Eleanor Scott	Highlands and Islands	Region	2003	2007
Lorna Slater	Lothian	Region	2021	2026
Lorna Slater	Edinburgh Central	Constituency	2026	
Andy Wightman	Lothian	Region	2016	2020 (Note: Andy Wightman resigned from the Scottish Greens on 18 December 2020, and sat as an independent MSP until the end of his term in May 2021)
