= Edinburgh South Western =

Constituency of the Scottish Parliament

- Burgh constituency for the Scottish Parliament
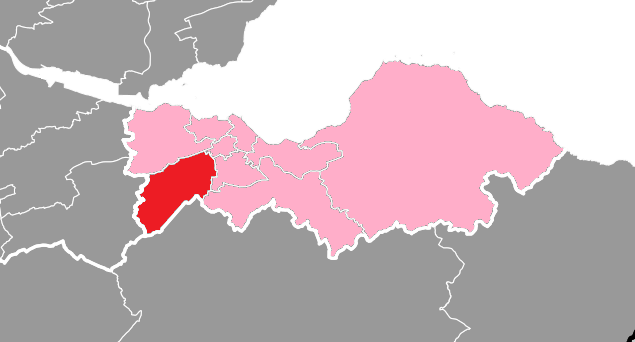

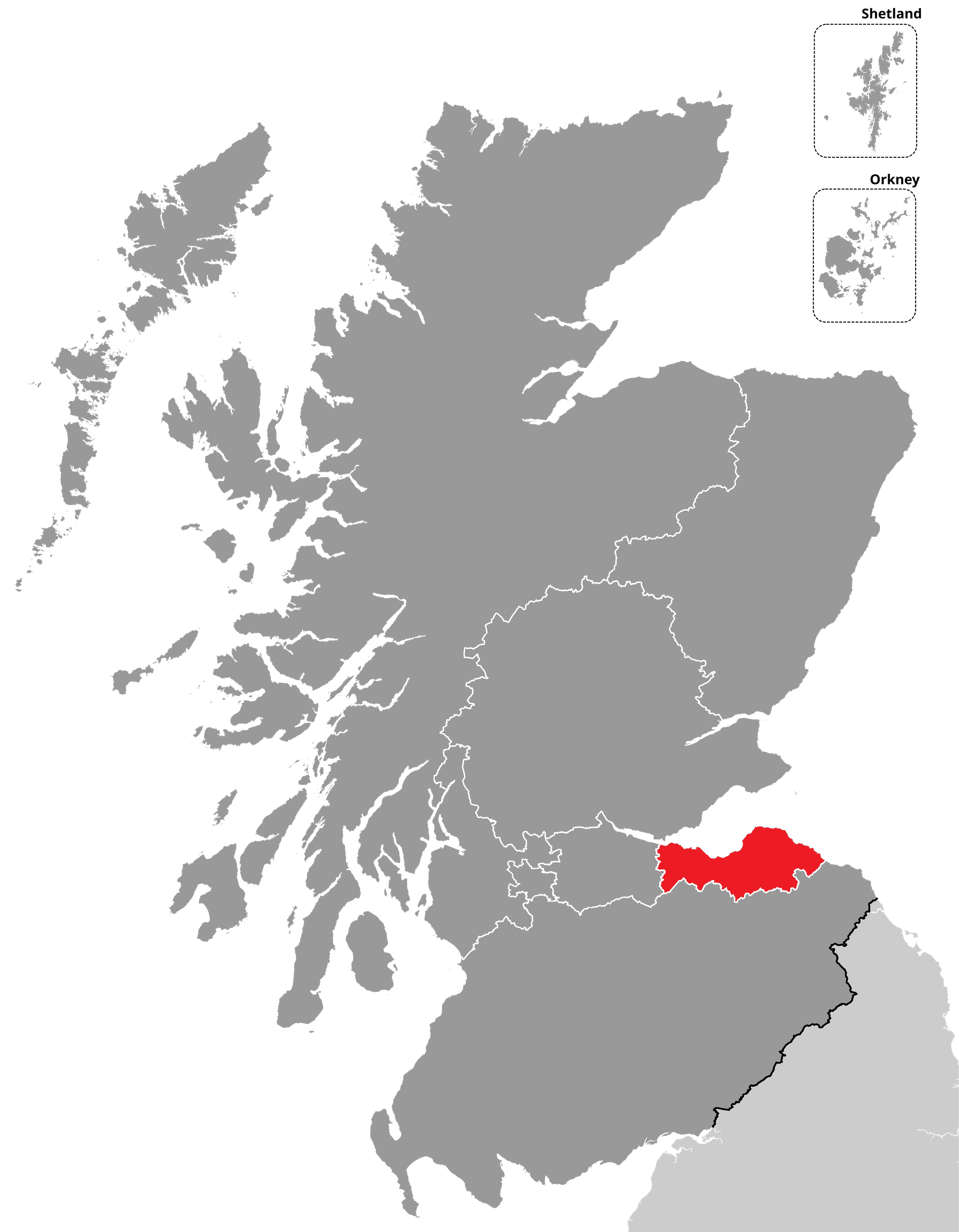
- Edinburgh South Western shown within the Edinburgh and Lothians East electoral region, and the region shown within Scotland
- Electoral region: Edinburgh and Lothians East
- Electorate: 60,829 (2026)
- Major settlements: Edinburgh

Current constituency
- Created: 2026
- Seats: 1
- Party: Scottish National Party
- MSP: Simita Kumar
- Council area: City of Edinburgh
- Created from: Edinburgh Pentlands, Edinburgh Southern

Edinburgh South Western is a burgh constituency of the Scottish Parliament covering part of the council area of Edinburgh. It elects one Member of the Scottish Parliament (MSP) by the plurality (first past the post) method of election. Under the additional-member electoral system used for elections to the Scottish Parliament, it is also one of nine constituencies in the Edinburgh and Lothians East electoral region, which elects seven additional members, in addition to the nine constituency MSPs, to produce a form of proportional representation for the region as a whole. The seat was created for the 2026 Scottish Parliament election, and predominantly replaces the Edinburgh Pentlands seat, which was abolished. It also includes areas that were formerly in the Edinburgh Southern constituency.

The seat has been represented by Simita Kumar of the Scottish National Party (SNP) since being first contested in 2026.

== Electoral region ==
The other eight constituencies of the Edinburgh and Lothians East region are East Lothian Coast and Lammermuirs, Edinburgh Eastern, Musselburgh and Tranent, Edinburgh Central, Edinburgh Northern, Edinburgh North Western, Edinburgh North Eastern and Leith, Edinburgh Southern, and Midlothian North. The region includes all of the City of Edinburgh and East Lothian council areas, and parts of the Midlothian council area.

== Constituency boundaries and council area ==
Edinburgh is represented in the Scottish Parliament by seven constituencies: Edinburgh Eastern, Musselburgh and Tranent (which also includes part of East Lothian), Edinburgh Central, Edinburgh North Eastern and Leith, Edinburgh North Western, Edinburgh Northern, Edinburgh Southern, and Edinburgh South Western. Following the second periodic review of Scottish Parliament boundaries in 2025, the Edinburgh South Western constituency covers the following electoral wards of Edinburgh Council:

- Pentland Hills (shared with Edinburgh North Western)
- Sighthill/Gorgie (shared with Edinburgh Central)
- Colinton/Fairmilehead (shared with Edinburgh Southern)
- Fountainbridge/Craiglockhart (shared with Edinburgh Central)

== Member of the Scottish Parliament ==
Election	Member	Party
2026	Simita Kumar	SNP

== Election results ==
=== 2020s ===
2026 Scottish Parliament election: Edinburgh South Western (Note: Note that changes in vote share are shown with respect to the notional result of the 2021 election, calculated to account for boundary changes)
Party	Candidate	Constituency			Regional		
Party	Candidate	Votes	%	±%	Votes	%	±%
SNP	Simita Kumar	11,727	36.2	▼6.6	7,409	22.8	
Labour	Catriona Munro	8,438	26.0	▲3.2	6,127	18.8	
Green					5,161	15.9	
Conservative	Sue Webber (Note: Incumbent member on the party list, or for another constituency)	4,636	14.3	▼13.5	4,274	13.1	
Reform	Cameron Rose	3,936	12.1	New	4,008	12.3	
Liberal Democrats	Andy Williamson	3,672	11.3	▲5.9	3,493	10.7	
Independent	Jeremy Balfour (Note: Balfour was an incumbent member on the regional list, having initially been elected as a member of the Conservatives)				382	1.2	
Independent Green Voice					272	0.8	
Animal Welfare					252	0.8	
Scottish Family					232	0.7	
Independent	Ash Regan (Note: Regan was the incumbent member for the Edinburgh Eastern constituency, having initially been elected as a member of the SNP)				153	0.5	
AtLS					149	0.5	
ISP					107	0.3	
Scottish Socialist					91	0.3	
Edinburgh & East Lothian People					86	0.3	
Workers Party					83	0.3	
Independent	Bonnie Prince Bob				61	0.2	
Communist					54	0.2	
Equality					41	0.1	
Scottish Libertarian					33	0.1	
Advance UK					32	0.1	
Independent	Morgwn Davies				3	0.0	
Majority		3,289	10.2				
Valid votes		32,409			32,503		
Invalid votes		171			87		
Turnout		32,580	53.6		32,590	53.6	
SNP win (new seat)							

== See also ==
- List of Scottish Parliament constituencies and electoral regions (2026–)
- Edinburgh South West (UK Parliament constituency)
