= Edinburgh Northern =

Constituency of the Scottish Parliament

- Burgh constituency for the Scottish Parliament
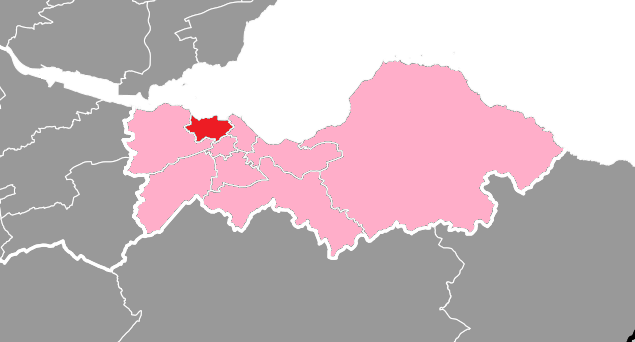

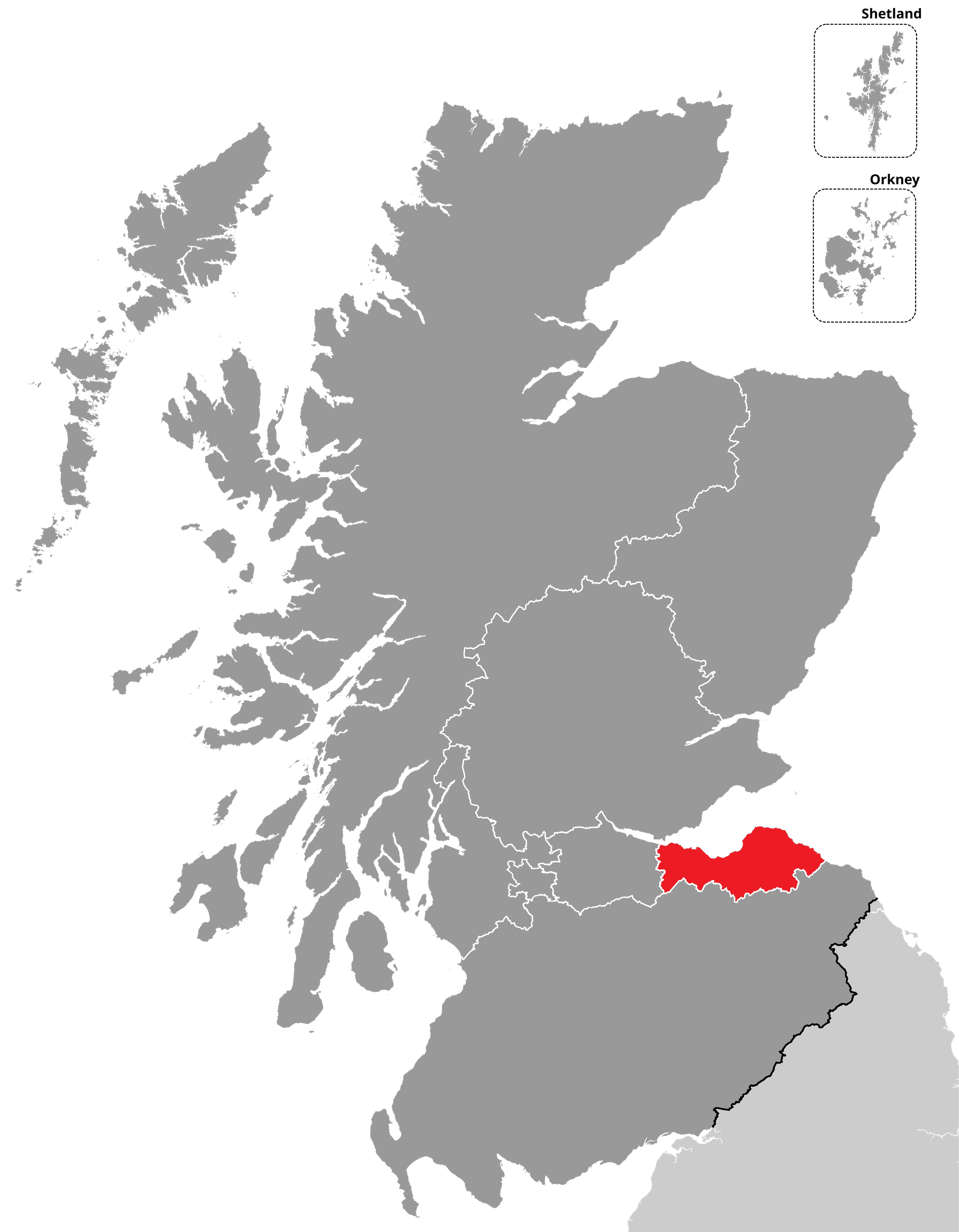
- Edinburgh Northern shown within the Edinburgh and Lothians East electoral region, and the region shown within Scotland
- Electoral region: Edinburgh and Lothians East
- Electorate: 66,052 (2026)
- Major settlements: Edinburgh

Current constituency
- Created: 2026
- Seats: 1
- Party: Liberal Democrats
- MSP: Sanne Dijkstra-Downie
- Council area: City of Edinburgh
- Created from: Edinburgh Northern and Leith and Edinburgh Western

Edinburgh Northern is a burgh constituency of the Scottish Parliament covering part of Edinburgh. It elects one Member of the Scottish Parliament (MSP) by the first past the post method of election. Under the additional-member electoral system used for elections to the Scottish Parliament, it is also one of nine constituencies in the Edinburgh and Lothians East electoral region, which elects seven additional members, in addition to the nine constituency MSPs, to produce a form of proportional representation for the region as a whole. The seat was created for the 2026 Scottish Parliament election, and covers areas that were previously in the former seats of Edinburgh Northern and Leith and Edinburgh Western.

The seat has been represented by Sanne Dijkstra-Downie of the Scottish Liberal Democrats since being first contested in 2026.

== Electoral region ==
The other eight constituencies of the Edinburgh and Lothians East region are East Lothian Coast and Lammermuirs, Edinburgh Eastern, Musselburgh and Tranent, Edinburgh Central, Edinburgh North Western, Edinburgh North Eastern and Leith, Edinburgh Southern, Edinburgh South Western and Midlothian North. The region includes all of the City of Edinburgh and East Lothian council areas, and parts of the Midlothian council area.

== Constituency boundaries and council area ==
Edinburgh is represented in the Scottish Parliament by seven constituencies: Edinburgh Eastern, Musselburgh and Tranent (which also includes part of East Lothian), Edinburgh Central, Edinburgh North Eastern and Leith, Edinburgh North Western, Edinburgh Northern, Edinburgh Southern, and Edinburgh South Western. Following the second periodic review of Scottish Parliament boundaries in 2025, the Edinburgh Northern constituency covers the following electoral wards of Edinburgh Council:

- Almond (shared with Edinburgh North Western);
- Leith Walk (shared with Edinburgh North Eastern and Leith);
- Forth (entire ward);
- Inverleith (entire ward)

== Member of the Scottish Parliament ==
Election	Member	Party
2026	Sanne Dijkstra-Downie	Scottish Liberal Democrats

== Election results ==
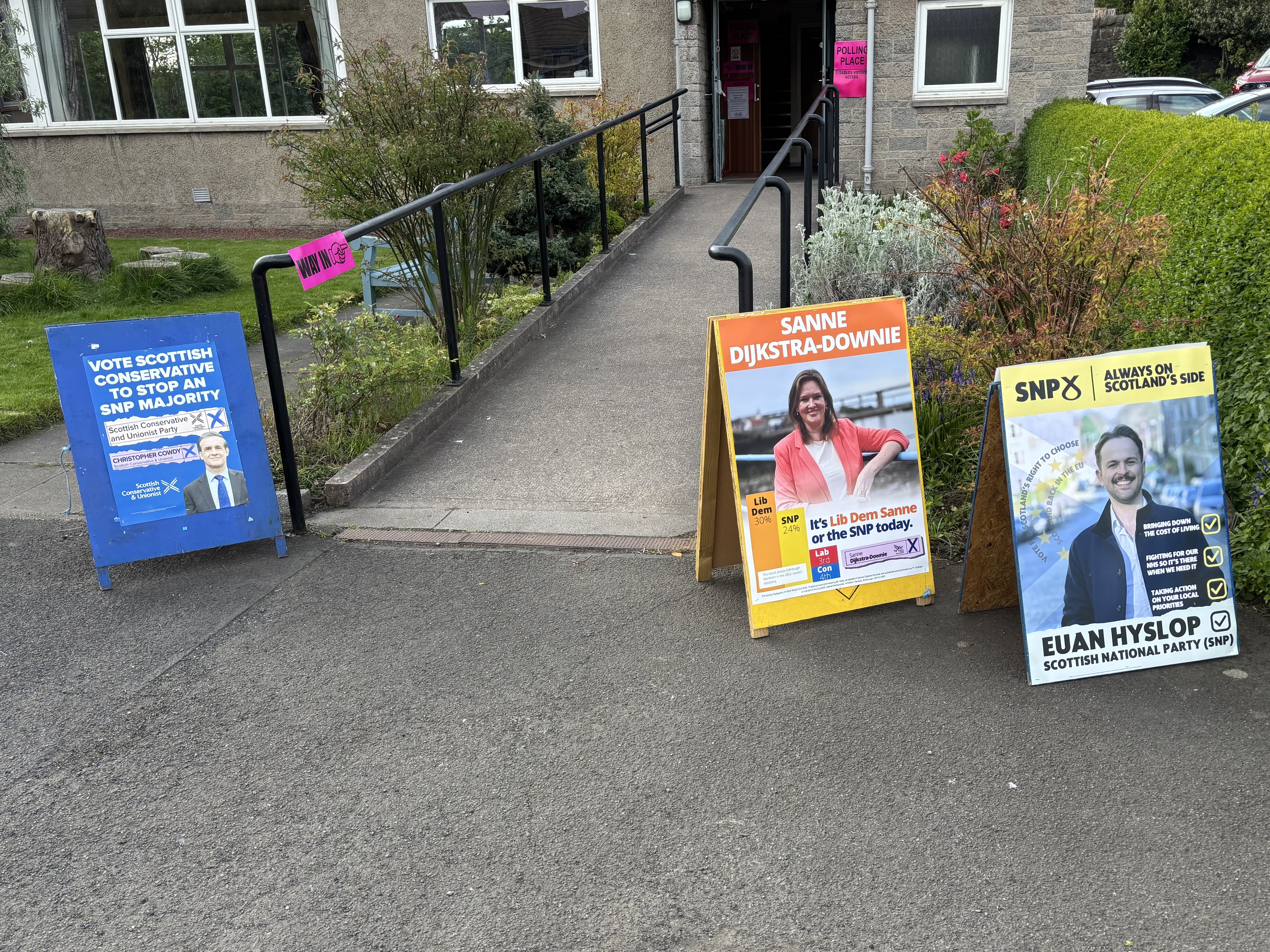
Election campaign banners for the Conservative, Liberal Democrat and SNP candidates in Edinburgh Northern for the 2026 election.

=== 2020s ===
2026 Scottish Parliament election: Edinburgh Northern (Note: Note that changes in vote share are shown with respect to the notional result of the 2021 election, calculated to account for boundary changes)
Party	Candidate	Constituency			Regional		
Party	Candidate	Votes	%	±%	Votes	%	±%
Liberal Democrats	Sanne Dijkstra-Downie	12,972	34.6	▲16.3	8,767	23.3	
SNP	Euan Hyslop	10,479	27.9	▼12.3	8,152	21.7	
Green	Kayleigh Kinross-O'Neill (Note: Elected on the party list)	5,289	14.1	▲7.6	7,570	20.1	
Labour	Eleanor Ryan-Saha	3,744	10.0	▼7.0	4,834	12.9	
Reform	Andrew McLaughlin	2,867	7.6	New	3,273	8.7	
Conservative	Christopher Cowdy	1,900	5.1	▼12.1	2,995	8.0	
Independent Green Voice					272	0.7	
Independent	Jeremy Balfour (Note: Balfour was an incumbent member on the regional list, having initially been elected as a member of the Conservatives)				239	0.6	
Animal Welfare					237	0.6	
Independent	Ash Regan (Note: Regan was the incumbent member for the Edinburgh Eastern constituency, having initially been elected as a member of the SNP)				191	0.5	
Scottish Family					159	0.4	
AtLS					155	0.4	
Workers Party	Abu Meron	258	0.7	New	140	0.4	
Scottish Socialist					110	0.3	
ISP					107	0.3	
Communist					104	0.3	
Edinburgh & East Lothian People					91	0.3	
Independent	Bonnie Prince Bob				65	0.2	
Scottish Libertarian					44	0.1	
Equality					32	0.1	
Advance UK					15	0.1	
Independent	Morgwn Davies				4	0.0	
Majority		2,493	6.7				
Valid votes		37,509			37,556		
Invalid votes		132			97		
Turnout		37,641	57.0		37,653	57.0	
Liberal Democrats win (new seat)							

== See also ==
- List of Scottish Parliament constituencies and electoral regions (2026–)

== See also ==
- List of Scottish Parliament constituencies and electoral regions (2026–)
- Edinburgh North (UK Parliament constituency)
