= Edinburgh North Eastern and Leith =

Constituency of the Scottish Parliament

- Burgh constituency for the Scottish Parliament
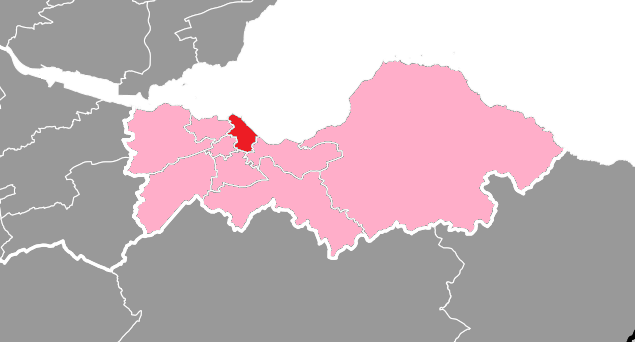

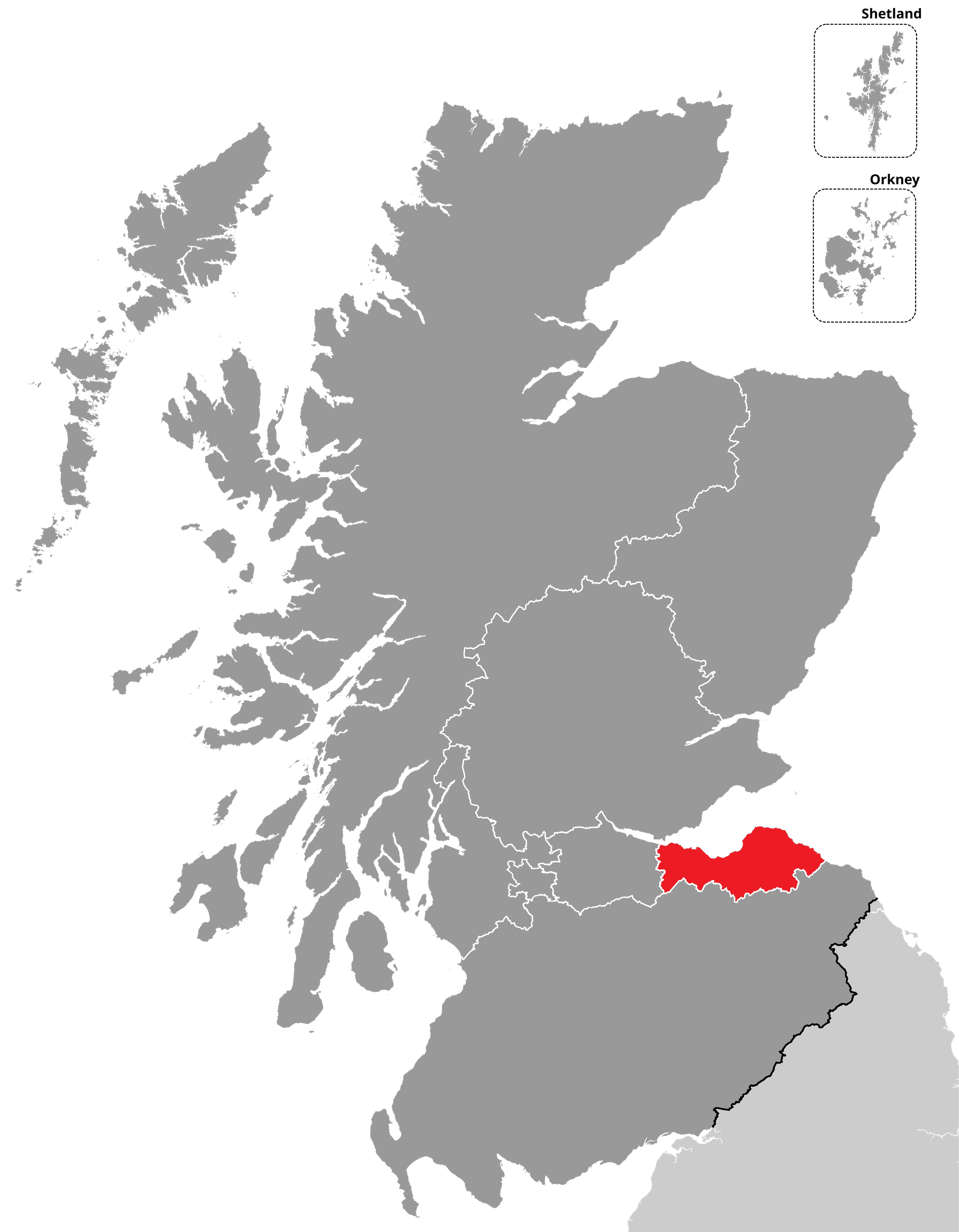
- Edinburgh North Eastern and Leith shown within the Edinburgh and Lothians East electoral region, and the region shown within Scotland
- Electoral region: Edinburgh and Lothians East
- Electorate: 66,739 (2026)
- Major settlements: Edinburgh, Leith

Current constituency
- Created: 2026
- Seats: 1
- Party: Scottish National Party
- MSP: Ben Macpherson
- Council area: City of Edinburgh
- Created from: Edinburgh Northern and Leith, Edinburgh Eastern

Edinburgh North Eastern and Leith is a burgh constituency of the Scottish Parliament covering part of Edinburgh. It elects one Member of the Scottish Parliament (MSP) by the first past the post method of election. Under the additional-member electoral system used for elections to the Scottish Parliament, it is also one of nine constituencies in the Edinburgh and Lothians East electoral region, which elects seven additional members, in addition to the nine constituency MSPs, to produce a form of proportional representation for the region as a whole. The seat was created for the 2026 Scottish Parliament election, and covers areas that were previously in the former seats of Edinburgh Northern and Leith and Edinburgh Eastern.

The seat has been represented by Ben Macpherson of the Scottish National Party since being first contested in 2026. Ben Macpherson was previously the member for the Edinburgh Northern and Leith constituency.

== Electoral region ==
The other eight constituencies of the Edinburgh and Lothians East region are East Lothian Coast and Lammermuirs, Edinburgh Eastern, Musselburgh and Tranent, Edinburgh Central, Edinburgh North Western, Edinburgh Northern, Edinburgh Southern, Edinburgh South Western and Midlothian North. The region includes all of the City of Edinburgh and East Lothian council areas, and parts of the Midlothian council area.

== Constituency boundaries and council area ==
Edinburgh is represented in the Scottish Parliament by seven constituencies: Edinburgh Eastern, Musselburgh and Tranent (which also includes part of East Lothian), Edinburgh Central, Edinburgh North Eastern and Leith, Edinburgh North Western, Edinburgh Northern, Edinburgh Southern, and Edinburgh South Western. Following the second periodic review of Scottish Parliament boundaries in 2025, the Edinburgh North Eastern and Leith constituency covers the following electoral wards of Edinburgh Council:

- Leith Walk (shared with Edinburgh Northern);
- Leith (entire ward);
- Craigentinny/Duddingston (entire ward);

== Member of the Scottish Parliament ==
Election	Member	Party
2026	Ben Macpherson	SNP

== Election results ==
=== 2020s ===
2026 Scottish Parliament election: Edinburgh North Eastern and Leith (Note: Note that changes in vote share are shown with respect to the notional result of the 2021 election, calculated to account for boundary changes)
Party	Candidate	Constituency			Regional		
Party	Candidate	Votes	%	±%	Votes	%	±%
SNP	Ben Macpherson (Note: Incumbent member for the Edinburgh Northern and Leith constituency)	13,630	35.8	▼14.6	9,380	24.6	
Green	Kate Nevens (Note: Elected on the party list)	10,559	27.8	▲19.0	13,282	34.9	
Labour	Oliver Thomas	7,894	20.8	▼5.1	6,429	16.9	
Reform	David Lees	2,746	7.2	New	2,775	7.3	
Liberal Democrats	Liss Owen	1,895	5.0	▲1.0	2,380	6.2	
Conservative	Haris Young	1,297	3.4	▼7.1	1,648	4.3	
Independent	Ash Regan (Note: Regan was the incumbent member for the Edinburgh Eastern constituency, having initially been elected as a member of the SNP)				340	0.9	
Independent Green Voice					261	0.7	
Scottish Socialist					234	0.6	
Animal Welfare					226	0.6	
AtLS					188	0.5	
Scottish Family					164	0.4	
Communist					142	0.4	
Independent	Jeremy Balfour (Note: Balfour was an incumbent member on the regional list, having initially been elected as a member of the Conservatives)				142	0.4	
Independent	Bonnie Prince Bob				134	0.4	
ISP					103	0.3	
Edinburgh & East Lothian People					102	0.3	
Workers Party					51	0.1	
Equality					44	0.1	
Advance UK					38	0.1	
Scottish Libertarian					34	0.1	
Independent	Morgwn Davies				6	0.0	
Majority		3,061	8.0				
Valid votes		38,021			38,189		
Invalid votes		175			86		
Turnout		66,739	57.2		38,275	57.2	
SNP win (new seat)							

== See also ==
- List of Scottish Parliament constituencies and electoral regions (2026–)

== See also ==
- List of Scottish Parliament constituencies and electoral regions (2026–)
