= Edinburgh Eastern, Musselburgh and Tranent =

Constituency of the Scottish Parliament

- Burgh constituency for the Scottish Parliament
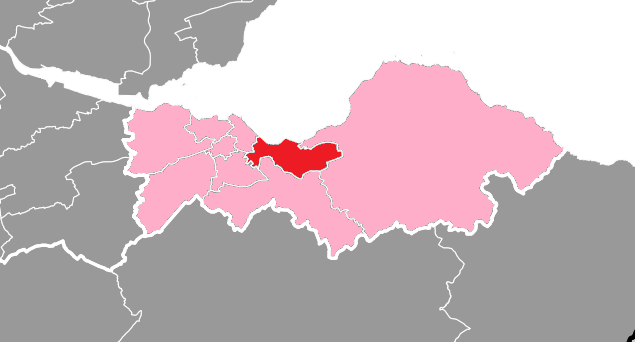

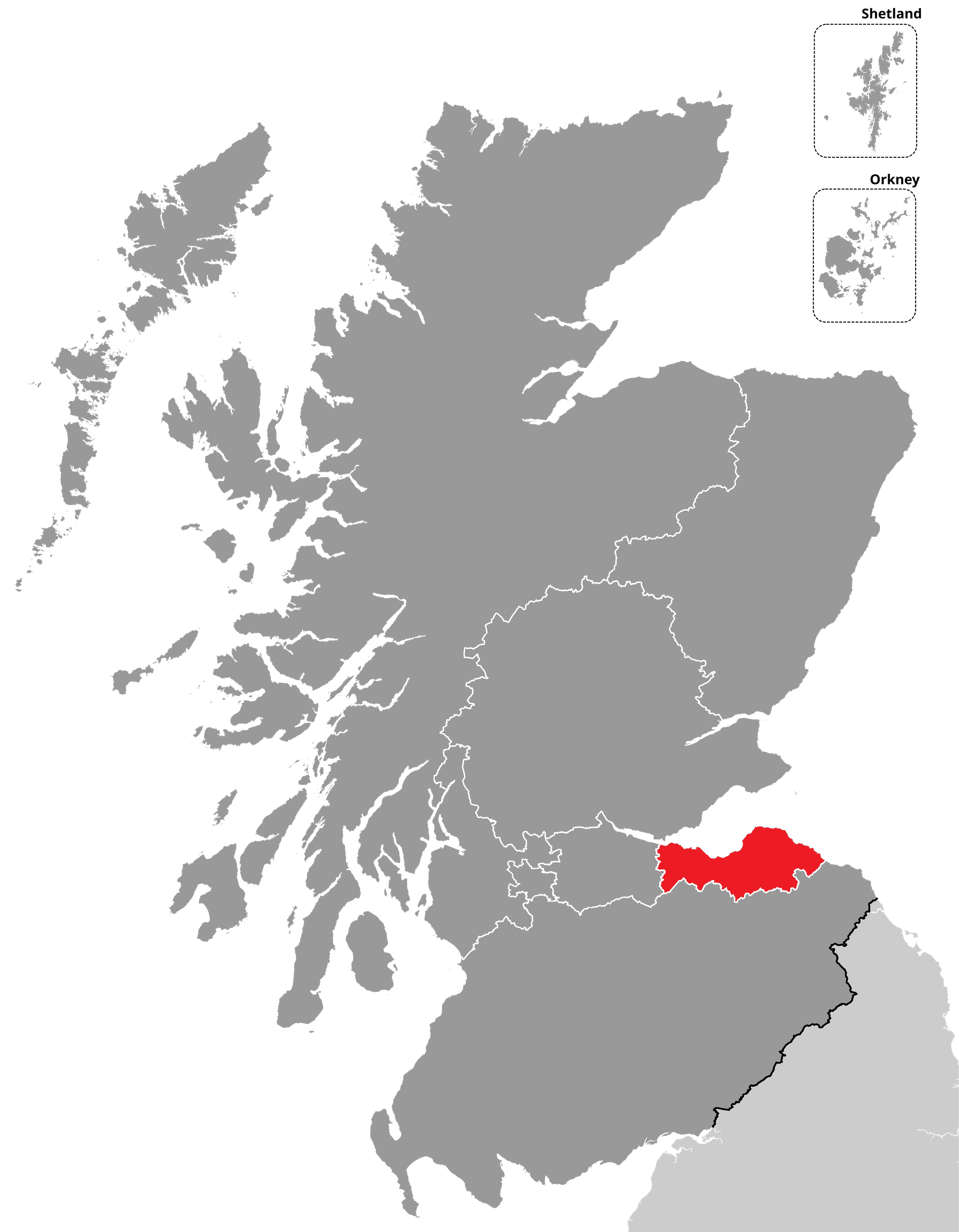
- Edinburgh Eastern, Musselburgh and Tranent shown within the Edinburgh and Lothians East electoral region, and the region shown within Scotland
- Electoral region: Edinburgh and Lothians East
- Electorate: 60,707 (2026)
- Major settlements: Edinburgh, Musselburgh, Tranent

Current constituency
- Created: 2026
- Seats: 1
- Party: Scottish National Party
- MSP: Kate Campbell
- Council area: City of Edinburgh, East Lothian Council
- Created from: Edinburgh Eastern

Edinburgh Eastern, Musselburgh and Tranent is a burgh constituency of the Scottish Parliament covering parts of Edinburgh and East Lothian. It elects one Member of the Scottish Parliament (MSP) by the first past the post method of election. Under the additional-member electoral system used for elections to the Scottish Parliament, it is also one of nine constituencies in the Edinburgh and Lothians East electoral region, which elects seven additional members, in addition to the nine constituency MSPs, to produce a form of proportional representation for the region as a whole.

The seat was created by the second periodic review of Scottish Parliament boundaries in 2025. It covers much of the former Edinburgh Eastern seat, but also includes areas that were formerly in the East Lothian seat, which had grown too large compared to other seats and therefore required to be redrawn. The remainder of the former East Lothian seat now forms the new East Lothian Coast and Lammermuirs seat.

The constituency has been represented by Kate Campbell of the Scottish National Party (SNP) since the 2026 Scottish Parliament election.

== Electoral region ==
The other eight constituencies of the Edinburgh and Lothians East region are East Lothian Coast and Lammermuirs, Edinburgh Central, Edinburgh North Eastern and Leith, Edinburgh North Western, Edinburgh Northern, Edinburgh Southern, Edinburgh South Western and Midlothian North. The region includes all of the City of Edinburgh and East Lothian council areas, and parts of the Midlothian council area.

== Constituency boundaries and council area ==
Edinburgh Eastern, Musselburgh and Tranent covers parts of the council area of Edinburgh and East Lothian. The remainder of East Lothian forms the East Lothian Coast and Lammermuirs constituency, whilst there are six seats covering the rest of Edinburgh (Edinburgh Central, Edinburgh North Eastern and Leith, Edinburgh North Western, Edinburgh Northern, Edinburgh South Western, and Edinburgh Southern). The following electoral wards were used to define the seat during the second review of Scottish Parliament boundaries:

- East Lothian Council:
  - Musselburgh (entire ward)
  - Tranent, Wallyford and Macmerry (part, shared with East Lothian Coast and Lammermuirs)
- City of Edinburgh Council:
  - Portobello/Craigmillar (entire ward)

== Member of the Scottish Parliament ==
Election	Member	Party
2026	Kate Campbell	SNP

== Election results ==
=== 2020s ===
2026 Scottish Parliament election: Edinburgh Eastern, Musselburgh and Tranent (Note: Note that changes in vote share are shown with respect to the notional result of the 2021 election, calculated to account for boundary changes)
Party	Candidate	Constituency			Regional		
Party	Candidate	Votes	%	±%	Votes	%	±%
SNP	Kate Campbell	14,083	44.7	▼2.6	8,570	27.1	▼12.2
Labour	Katherine Sangster (Note: Elected on the party list)	9,097	28.9	▼4.8	6,750	21.4	▼1.3
Reform	Angela Ross	4,120	13.1	New	4,027	12.7	▲10.2
Liberal Democrats	Alan Grant	2,057	6.5	▲3.2	1,727	5.5	▲5.7
Conservative	Tim Jones	1,819	5.8	▼9.9	2,039	6.5	▼11.4
AtLS	Joe Smith	305	1.0	New	232	0.7	▲0.5
Green					6,435	20.4	▲7.9
Independent Green Voice					285	0.9	▲0.7
Independent	Ash Regan (Note: Regan was the incumbent member for the Edinburgh Eastern constituency, having initially been elected as a member of the SNP)				251	0.8	▲0.6
Scottish Family					221	0.7	▲0.5
Edinburgh & East Lothian People					214	0.7	▲0.3
Animal Welfare					211	0.7	▲0.6
Independent	Jeremy Balfour (Note: Balfour was an incumbent member on the regional list, having initially been elected as a member of the Conservatives)				143	0.5	▲0.7
Scottish Socialist					109	0.3	▲0.3
ISP					107	0.3	▲0.3
Communist					58	0.2	▲0.2
Independent	Bonnie Prince Bob				51	0.2	▲0.2
Workers Party					45	0.1	▲0.2
Scottish Libertarian					40	0.1	▲0.1
Advance UK					30	0.1	▲0.1
Equality					23	0.1	▲0.1
Independent	Morgwn Davies				11	0.0	▲0.1
Majority		4,986	15.8	▲2.2			
Valid votes		31,481			31,579		
Invalid votes		172			96		
Turnout		31,645	52.1	▼7.7	31,675	52.1	▼7.7
SNP win (new seat)							

== See also ==
- List of Scottish Parliament constituencies and electoral regions (2026–)

== See also ==
- List of Scottish Parliament constituencies and electoral regions (2026–)
