= Edinburgh North Western =

Constituency of the Scottish Parliament

- Burgh constituency for the Scottish Parliament
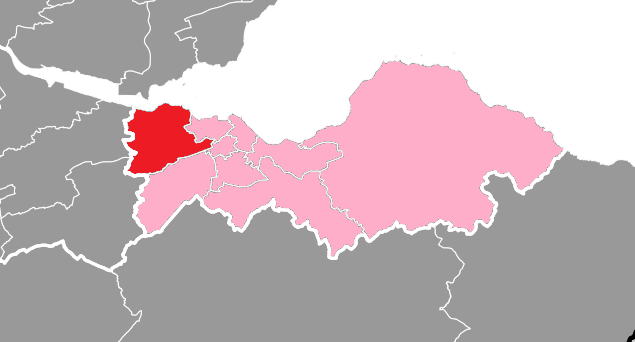

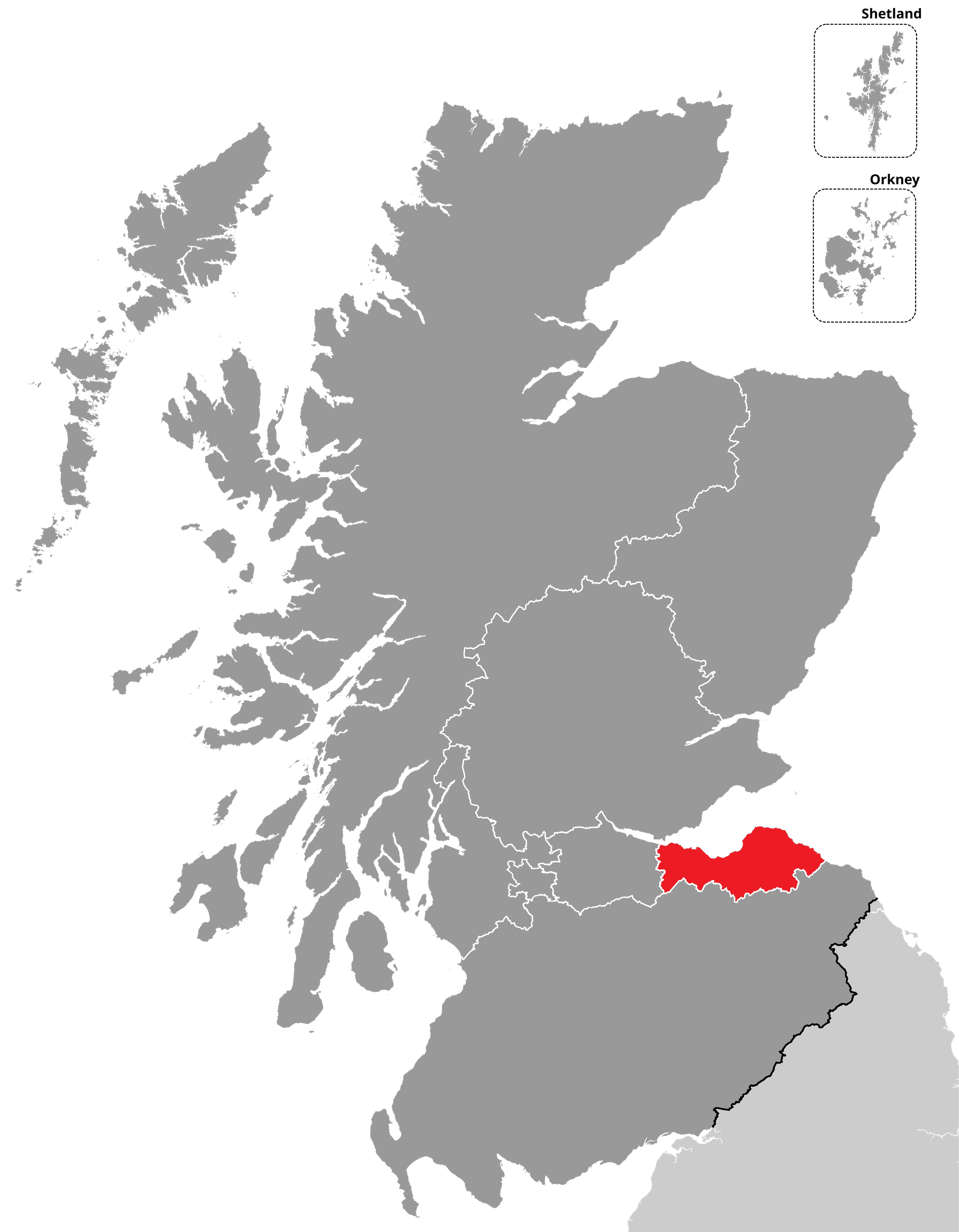
- Edinburgh North Western shown within the Edinburgh and Lothians East electoral region, and the region shown within Scotland
- Electoral region: Edinburgh and Lothians East
- Electorate: 64,233 (2026)
- Major settlements: Edinburgh

Current constituency
- Created: 2026
- Seats: 1
- Party: Liberal Democrats
- MSP: Alex Cole-Hamilton
- Council area: City of Edinburgh
- Created from: Edinburgh Western, Edinburgh Pentlands

Edinburgh North Western is a burgh constituency of the Scottish Parliament covering part of Edinburgh. It elects one Member of the Scottish Parliament (MSP) by the first past the post method of election. Under the additional-member electoral system used for elections to the Scottish Parliament, it is also one of nine constituencies in the Edinburgh and Lothians East electoral region, which elects seven additional members, in addition to the nine constituency MSPs, to produce a form of proportional representation for the region as a whole. The seat was created for the 2026 Scottish Parliament election, and covers areas that were previously in the seats of Edinburgh Western and Edinburgh Pentlands, both of which were abolished at this review.

The seat has been represented by Alex Cole-Hamilton of the Scottish Liberal Democrats since being first contested in 2026. Cole-Hamilton was previously the member for the Edinburgh Western constituency.

== Electoral region ==
The other eight constituencies of the Edinburgh and Lothians East region are East Lothian Coast and Lammermuirs, Edinburgh Eastern, Musselburgh and Tranent, Edinburgh Central, Edinburgh Northern, Edinburgh North Eastern and Leith, Edinburgh Southern, Edinburgh South Western and Midlothian North. The region includes all of the City of Edinburgh and East Lothian council areas, and parts of the Midlothian council area.

== Constituency boundaries and council area ==
Edinburgh is represented in the Scottish Parliament by seven constituencies: Edinburgh Eastern, Musselburgh and Tranent (which also includes part of East Lothian), Edinburgh Central, Edinburgh North Eastern and Leith, Edinburgh North Western, Edinburgh Northern, Edinburgh Southern, and Edinburgh South Western. Following the second periodic review of Scottish Parliament boundaries in 2025, the Edinburgh North Western constituency covers the following electoral wards of Edinburgh Council:

- Almond (shared with Edinburgh Northern);
- Pentland Hills (shared with Edinburgh South Western);
- Drum Brae/Gyle (entire ward);
- Corstorphine/Murrayfield (entire ward);

== Member of the Scottish Parliament ==
Election	Member	Party
2026	Alex Cole-Hamilton	Scottish Liberal Democrats

== Election results ==
=== 2020s ===
2026 Scottish Parliament election: Edinburgh North Western (Note: Note that changes in vote share are shown with respect to the notional result of the 2021 election, calculated to account for boundary changes)
Party	Candidate	Constituency			Regional		
Party	Candidate	Votes	%	±%	Votes	%	±%
Liberal Democrats	Alex Cole-Hamilton (Note: Incumbent member for the Edinburgh Western constituency)	22,959	57.2	▲8.4	14,512	36.1	
SNP	Lyn Jardine	9,943	24.8	▼8.1	7,561	18.8	
Green					5,250	13.1	
Reform	Davie Thomson	3,342	8.3	New	4,116	10.2	
Labour	Irshad Ahmed (Note: Elected on the party list)	1,879	4.7	▼2.6	3,321	8.3	
Conservative	Rachel Cairns	1,749	4.4	▼5.4	3,412	8.5	
Independent	Jeremy Balfour (Note: Balfour was an incumbent member on the regional list, having initially been elected as a member of the Conservatives)				449	1.1	
Independent Green Voice					230	0.6	
Scottish Family					211	0.5	
Independent	Ash Regan (Note: Regan was the incumbent member for the Edinburgh Eastern constituency, having initially been elected as a member of the SNP)				207	0.5	
Animal Welfare					181	0.5	
AtLS					154	0.4	
Workers Party	David Henry	268	0.7	New	109	0.3	
ISP					88	0.2	
Scottish Libertarian					72	0.2	
Edinburgh & East Lothian People					64	0.2	
Independent	Bonnie Prince Bob				60	0.2	
Scottish Socialist					60	0.1	
Communist					55	0.1	
Advance UK					33	0.1	
Equality					28	0.1	
Independent	Morgwn Davies				3	0.0	
Majority		13,016	32.4				
Valid votes		40,140			40,290		
Invalid votes		131			94		
Turnout		40,271	62.7		40,384	62.7	
Liberal Democrats win (new boundaries)							

== See also ==
- List of Scottish Parliament constituencies and electoral regions (2026–)

== See also ==
- List of Scottish Parliament constituencies and electoral regions (2026–)
