= Edinburgh Western =

Former constituency of the Scottish Parliament

- Former burgh constituency for the Scottish Parliament

- Edinburgh Western shown within the Lothian electoral region and the region shown within Scotland
- Population: 85,095 (2019)

Former constituency
- Created: 2011
- Abolished: 2026
- Council area: City of Edinburgh
- Created from: Edinburgh West
- Replaced by: Edinburgh North Western, Edinburgh Northern

Edinburgh Western (Gaelic: Dùn Èideann an Iar) was a constituency of the Scottish Parliament covering part of the City of Edinburgh council area. Under the additional-member system used for elections to the Scottish Parliament, the seat elected one Member of the Scottish Parliament (MSP) by the plurality (first past the post) method of election, and was also one of nine constituencies in the Lothian electoral region, which elected seven additional members, in addition to the nine constituency MSPs, to produce a form of proportional representation for the region as a whole. The constituency was created ahead of the 2011 Scottish Parliament election, when it replaced the former Edinburgh West constituency.

As a result of the second periodic review of Scottish Parliament boundaries in 2025, Edinburgh Western was abolished. The bulk of the seat formed the new constituency of Edinburgh North Western from the 2026 Scottish Parliament election. A portion was also transferred to the new Edinburgh Northern constituency.

The seat was held by Alex Cole-Hamilton of the Scottish Liberal Democrats from the 2016 Scottish Parliament election until its abolition.

== Electoral region ==
During the period Edinburgh Western was in existence, the other eight constituencies of the Lothian region were: Almond Valley, Edinburgh Central, Edinburgh Eastern, Edinburgh Northern and Leith, Edinburgh Pentlands, Edinburgh Southern, Linlithgow and Midlothian North and Musselburgh. In this period the region included all of the City of Edinburgh council area, parts of the East Lothian council area, parts of the Midlothian council area and all of the West Lothian council area.

The Lothian electoral region was also abolished as a result of second periodic review, with the area covered now mostly forming parts of the new Edinburgh and Lothians East and Central Scotland and Lothians West regions, with a small portion also being transferred to the South Scotland region.

== Constituency boundaries and council area ==
Map of boundaries from 2011

During the period Edinburgh Western was in existence, the City of Edinburgh council area was represented in the Scottish Parliament by six constituencies: Edinburgh Central, Edinburgh Eastern, Edinburgh Northern and Leith, Edinburgh Pentlands, Edinburgh Southern and Edinburgh Western.

For the first election to the Scottish Parliament in 1999 the constituencies used were identical to those already in use for the House of Commons of the United Kingdom, and thus there was a Scottish Parliament constituency of Edinburgh West, which shared the name and boundaries of the existing Edinburgh West House of Commons constituency. Ahead of the 2005 United Kingdom general election the boundaries of constituencies for the House of Commons were reviewed, whilst being retained for elections to the Scottish Parliament. There is now no longer any link between the two sets of boundaries. Ahead of the 2011 Scottish Parliament election, Socttish Parliament boundaries were reviewed, and Edinburgh West was largely replaced with Edinburgh Western, which was defined using the following electoral wards of the City of Edinburgh Council:

- In full: Almond, Drum Brae/Gyle
- In part: Forth, Inverleith (shared with Edinburgh Northern and Leith), Corstorphine/Murrayfield (shared with Edinburgh Central)

== Members of the Scottish Parliament ==
Election	Member	Party
2011	Colin Keir	SNP
2016	Alex Cole-Hamilton	Liberal Democrats

== Election results ==
=== 2020s ===
2021 Scottish Parliament election: Edinburgh Western
Party	Candidate	Constituency			Regional		
Party	Candidate	Votes	%	±%	Votes	%	±%
Liberal Democrats	Alex Cole-Hamilton (Note: Incumbent member for this constituency)	25,578	54.7	▲12.8	11,923	25.5	▲4.6
SNP	Sarah Masson	15,693	33.5	▼0.9	14,409	30.7	▼1.4
Conservative	Sue Webber	2,798	6.0	▼8.3	9,350	20.0	▼5.6
Labour	Margaret Graham	2,515	5.4	▼4.0	5,140	11.0	▼0.6
Green					4,101	8.7	▲1.8
Alba					614	1.3	New
All for Unity					240	0.5	New
Animal Welfare					237	0.5	New
Scottish Family					227	0.5	New
Scottish Libertarian	Daniel Fraser	201	0.4	New	107	0.2	New
Abolish the Scottish Parliament					94	0.2	New
Freedom Alliance (UK)					90	0.2	New
Women's Equality					86	0.2	▼0.6
Reform					64	0.1	New
Communist					44	0.1	New
UKIP					42	0.1	▼1.4
Independent	Ashley Graczyk				27	0.1	New
SDP					25	0.1	New
Renew					9	0.0	New
Majority		9,885	21.2	▲13.7			
Valid votes		46,785			46,829		
Invalid votes		116			67		
Turnout		46,901	71.5	▲6.8	46,895	71.5	▲6.8
Liberal Democrats hold		Swing		▲6.9			
Notes

In 2021, Edinburgh Western set the record for the most votes ever cast for a single candidate in a Scottish Parliament election.

=== 2010s ===
2016 Scottish Parliament election: Edinburgh Western
Party	Candidate	Constituency			Region		
Party	Candidate	Votes	%	±%	Votes	%	±%
Liberal Democrats	Alex Cole-Hamilton	16,645	41.9	▲14.1	8,321	20.9	▲9.0
SNP	Toni Giugliano	13,685	34.4	▼1.4	12,835	32.2	▼5.9
Conservative	Sandy Batho	5,686	14.3	▼0.8	10,199	25.6	▲10.8
Labour	Cat Headley	3,750	9.4	▼12.0	4,624	11.6	▼5.9
Green					2,760	6.9	▲1.8
UKIP					594	1.5	▲0.7
Women's Equality					309	0.8	New
RISE					115	0.3	New
Solidarity					101	0.3	▲0.2
Majority		2,960	7.5	N/A			
Valid votes		39,766			39,858		
Invalid votes		124			55		
Turnout		39,890	64.7	▲5.0	39,913	64.7	▲5.1
Liberal Democrats gain from SNP		Swing					
Notes

2011 Scottish Parliament election: Edinburgh Western
Party	Candidate	Constituency			Region		
Party	Candidate	Votes	%	±%	Votes	%	±%
SNP	Colin Keir	11,965	35.8	N/A	12,747	38.1	N/A
Liberal Democrats	Margaret Smith (Note: Incumbent member on the party list, or for another constituency)	9,276	27.7	N/A	3,988	11.9	N/A
Labour	Lesley Hinds	7,164	21.4	N/A	5,870	17.5	N/A
Conservative	Gordon Lindhurst	5,047	15.1	N/A	4,952	14.8	N/A
Independent	Margo MacDonald				2,707	8.1	N/A
Green					1,728	5.2	N/A
All-Scotland Pensioners Party					424	1.3	N/A
UKIP					268	0.8	N/A
BNP					200	0.6	N/A
Liberal					156	0.5	N/A
Socialist Labour					131	0.4	N/A
Scottish Christian					92	0.3	N/A
Scottish Socialist					92	0.3	N/A
CPA					66	0.2	N/A
Solidarity					28	0.1	N/A
Independent	Ken O'Neil				12	0.0	N/A
Independent	Mev Brown				6	0.0	N/A
Independent	David Hogg				6	0.0	N/A
Majority		2,689	7.9	N/A			
Valid votes		33,452			33,473		
Invalid votes		152			99		
Turnout		33,604	59.6	N/A	33,572	59.6	N/A
SNP win (new seat)							

== See also ==
- Politics of Edinburgh
