= Edinburgh Pentlands (Scottish Parliament constituency) =

Region or constituency of the Scottish Parliament

- Former burgh constituency for the Scottish Parliament

- Edinburgh Pentlands shown within the Lothian electoral region and the region shown within Scotland
- Population: 77,633 (2019)

Former constituency
- Created: 1999
- Abolished: 2026
- Council area: City of Edinburgh
- Replaced by: Edinburgh South Western, Edinburgh North Western, Edinburgh Southern

Edinburgh Pentlands (Gaelic: Dùn Èideann Pentlands) was a constituency of the Scottish Parliament covering part of the council area of Edinburgh. Under the additional-member system used for elections to the Scottish Parliament, the seat elected one Member of the Scottish Parliament (MSP) by the plurality (first past the post) method of election, and was also one of nine constituencies in the Lothian electoral region, which elected seven additional members, in addition to the nine constituency MSPs, to produce a form of proportional representation for the region as a whole. The constituency had existed since the 1999 Scottish Parliament election.

As a result of the second periodic review of Scottish Parliament boundaries in 2025, Edinburgh Pentlands was abolished. The bulk of the seat would form the new constituency of Edinburgh South Western from the 2026 Scottish Parliament election. Some parts of Edinburgh Pentlands would also be transferred to Edinburgh North Western and Edinburgh Southern.

The seat was held by Gordon MacDonald of the Scottish National Party from the 2011 Scottish Parliament election until its abolition.

== Electoral region ==
During the period Edinburgh Pentlands was in existence, the other eight constituencies of the Lothian region were: Almond Valley, Edinburgh Central, Edinburgh Eastern, Edinburgh Northern and Leith, Edinburgh Southern, Edinburgh Western, Linlithgow and Midlothian North and Musselburgh. In this period the region included all of the City of Edinburgh council area, parts of the East Lothian council area, parts of the Midlothian council area and all of the West Lothian council area.

The Lothian electoral region was also abolished as a result of second periodic review, with the area covered now mostly forming parts of the new Edinburgh and Lothians East and Central Scotland and Lothians West regions, with a small portion also being transferred to the South Scotland region.

== Constituency boundaries and council area ==
Map of Westminster boundaries from 2005

During the period Edinburgh Pentlands was in existence, Edinburgh was represented in the Scottish Parliament by six constituencies: Edinburgh Central, Edinburgh Eastern, Edinburgh Northern and Leith, Edinburgh Pentlands, Edinburgh Southern and Edinburgh Western.

The Edinburgh Pentlands constituency was created at the same time as the Scottish Parliament, for the 1999, using the name and boundaries of the existing Edinburgh Pentlands constituency of the House of Commons. Ahead of the 2005 United Kingdom general election the boundaries of constituencies for the House of Commons were reviewed, whilst being retained for elections to the Scottish Parliament. There is now no longer any link between the two sets of boundaries.

Following the first periodic review Edinburgh Pentlands was defined using the following electoral wards of the City of Edinburgh Council:

- In full: Pentland Hills, Colinton/Fairmilehead
- In part: Sighthill/Gorgie shared with (Edinburgh Central)

== Members of the Scottish Parliament ==
Election	Member	Party
1999	Iain Gray	Labour
2003	David McLetchie	Conservative
2011	Gordon MacDonald	SNP

== Election results ==
=== 2020s ===
2021 Scottish Parliament election: Edinburgh Pentlands
Party	Candidate	Constituency			Regional		
Party	Candidate	Votes	%	±%	Votes	%	±%
SNP	Gordon MacDonald (Note: Incumbent member for this constituency)	16,227	42.4	▲2.9	12,916	33.7	▼1.2
Conservative	Gordon Lindhurst (Note: Incumbent member on the party list, or for another constituency)	12,330	32.3	▲0.1	10,850	28.3	▼4.0
Labour	Lezley Cameron	6,998	18.3	▼5.1	6,903	18.0	▼0.7
Green					3,702	9.7	▲2.7
Liberal Democrats	Fraser Graham	2,213	5.8	▲0.9	2,150	5.6	▲1.9
Alba					523	1.4	New
Scottish Family	Richard Lucas	462	1.2	New	297	0.8	New
All for Unity					257	0.7	New
Animal Welfare					210	0.5	New
Women's Equality					86	0.2	▼0.7
Independent	Ashley Graczyk				79	0.2	New
Abolish the Scottish Parliament					73	0.2	New
Reform					71	0.2	New
Freedom Alliance (UK)					56	0.1	New
UKIP					50	0.1	▼1.7
Scottish Libertarian					44	0.1	New
Communist					31	0.1	New
SDP					19	0.0	New
Renew					6	0.0	New
Majority		3,897	10.1	▲2.8			
Valid votes		38,230			38,323		
Invalid votes		119			43		
Turnout		38,349	64.9	▲4.3	38,366	64.9	▲4.2
SNP hold		Swing					

=== 2010s ===
2016 Scottish Parliament election: Edinburgh Pentlands
Party	Candidate	Constituency			Region		
Party	Candidate	Votes	%	±%	Votes	%	±%
SNP	Gordon MacDonald (Note: Incumbent member for this constituency)	13,181	39.5	▲2.2	11,690	34.9	▼4.4
Conservative	Gordon Lindhurst (Note: Elected on the party list)	10,725	32.2	▲0.8	10,796	32.3	▲12.6
Labour	Blair Heary	7,811	23.4	▼3.2	6,251	18.7	▼2.2
Green					2,339	7.0	▲1.7
Liberal Democrats	Emma Farthing-Sykes	1,636	4.9	▲0.3	1,252	3.7	▲0.2
UKIP					591	1.8	▲1.2
Women's Equality					311	0.9	New
RISE					126	0.4	New
Solidarity					93	0.3	▲0.2
Majority		2,456	7.3	▲1.4			
Valid votes		33,353			33,449		
Invalid votes		137			67		
Turnout		33,490	60.6	▲3.3	33,516	60.7	▲3.3
SNP hold		Swing					
Notes

2011 Scottish Parliament election: Edinburgh Pentlands
Party	Candidate	Constituency			Region		
Party	Candidate	Votes	%	±%	Votes	%	±%
SNP	Gordon MacDonald	11,197	37.3	N/A	11,846	39.3	N/A
Conservative	David McLetchie (Note: Incumbent member for this constituency)	9,439	31.4	N/A	5,945	19.7	N/A
Labour	Ricky Henderson	7,993	26.6	N/A	6,284	20.9	N/A
Independent	Margo MacDonald (Note: Incumbent member on the party list, or for another constituency)				2,206	7.3	N/A
Green					1,588	5.3	N/A
Liberal Democrats	Simon Clark	1,420	4.6	N/A	1,041	3.5	N/A
All-Scotland Pensioners Party					346	1.1	N/A
BNP					201	0.7	N/A
UKIP					175	0.6	N/A
Scottish Christian					122	0.4	N/A
Socialist Labour					117	0.4	N/A
Scottish Socialist					102	0.7	N/A
CPA					56	0.2	N/A
Liberal					49	0.2	N/A
Solidarity					18	0.1	N/A
Independent	Ken O'Neil				14	0.0	N/A
Independent	David Hogg				6	0.0	N/A
Independent	Mev Brown				4	0.0	N/A
Majority		1,758	5.9	N/A			
Valid votes		30,049			30,120		
Invalid votes		107			91		
Turnout		30,156	57.3	N/A	30,211	57.4	N/A
SNP win (new boundaries)							

=== 2000s ===
2007 Scottish Parliament election: Edinburgh Pentlands
Party	Candidate	Votes	%	±%
Conservative	David McLetchie	12,927	37.6	+0.4
Labour	Sheila Gilmore	8,402	24.4	−6.5
SNP	Ian McKee	8,234	23.9	+7.1
Liberal Democrats	Simon Clark	4,814	14.0	+2.2
Majority		4,525	13.2	+6.9
Turnout		34,377		
Conservative hold		Swing		

2003 Scottish Parliament election: Edinburgh Pentlands
Party	Candidate	Votes	%	±%
Conservative	David McLetchie	12,420	37.2	+8.3
Labour	Iain Gray	10,309	30.9	−5.3
SNP	Ian McKee	5,620	16.8	−5.4
Liberal Democrats	Simon Clark	3,943	11.8	−0.9
Scottish Socialist	Frank O'Donnell	1,090	3.3	New
Majority		2,111	6.3	N/A
Turnout		33,382	57.1	−8.9
Conservative gain from Labour		Swing	+6.8	

=== 1990s ===
1999 Scottish Parliament election: Edinburgh Pentlands
Party	Candidate	Votes	%	±%
Labour	Iain Gray	14,343	36.2	N/A
Conservative	David McLetchie	11,458	28.9	N/A
SNP	Stewart Gibb	8,770	22.2	N/A
Liberal Democrats	Ian Gibson	5,029	12.7	N/A
Majority		2,885	7.3	N/A
Turnout		39,600	66.0	N/A
Labour win (new seat)				

== See also ==
- Edinburgh Pentlands (UK Parliament constituency)
- Politics of Edinburgh
