= Edinburgh Northern and Leith =

Scottish constituency, 2011–2026

- Former burgh constituency for the Scottish Parliament

- Edinburgh Northern and Leith shown within the Lothian electoral region and the region shown within Scotland
- Population: 93,605 (2019)

Former constituency
- Created: 2011
- Abolished: 2026
- Council area: City of Edinburgh
- Created from: Edinburgh North and Leith
- Replaced by: Edinburgh North Eastern and Leith, Edinburgh Northern

Edinburgh Northern and Leith (Gaelic: Dùn Èideann a Tuath agus Lite) was a constituency of the Scottish Parliament covering part of the council area of Edinburgh. Under the additional-member system used for elections to the Scottish Parliament, the seat elected one Member of the Scottish Parliament (MSP) by the plurality (first past the post) method of election, and was also one of nine constituencies in the Lothian electoral region, which elected seven additional members, in addition to the nine constituency MSPs, to produce a form of proportional representation for the region as a whole. The constituency was formed ahead of the 2011 Scottish Parliament election as a result of the first periodic review of Scottish Parliament boundaries. Prior to this review most of the area covered by the constituency was part of the Edinburgh North and Leith constituency, which was abolished.

As a result of the second periodic review of Scottish Parliament boundaries in 2025, Edinburgh Northern and Leith was abolished ahead of the 2026 Scottish Parliament election. The areas covered by the constituency became part of the new constituencies of Edinburgh North Eastern and Leith and Edinburgh Northern.

The seat was held by Ben Macpherson of the Scottish National Party from the 2016 Scottish Parliament election until its abolition.

== Electoral region ==
During the period Edinburgh Northern and Leith was in existence, the other eight constituencies of the Lothian region were: Almond Valley, Edinburgh Central, Edinburgh Eastern, Edinburgh Pentlands, Edinburgh Southern, Edinburgh Western, Linlithgow and Midlothian North and Musselburgh.

In this period the region included all of the City of Edinburgh council area, parts of the East Lothian council area, parts of the Midlothian council area and all of the West Lothian council area.

== Constituency boundaries and council area ==
Map of boundaries (2011-2026)

During the period Edinburgh Northern and Leith was in existence, Edinburgh was represented in the Scottish Parliament by six constituencies: Edinburgh Central, Edinburgh Eastern, Edinburgh Northern and Leith, Edinburgh Pentlands, Edinburgh Southern and Edinburgh Western.

The Edinburgh North and Leith constituency was created at the same time as the Scottish Parliament, for the 1999 Scottish Parliament election, using the name and boundaries of the existing Edinburgh North and Leith constituency of the House of Commons of the United Kingdom. Ahead of the 2005 United Kingdom general election the boundaries of constituencies for the House of Commons were reviewed, whilst being retained for elections to the Scottish Parliament. There is now no longer any link between the two sets of boundaries.

When defined in 2011, Edinburgh Northern and Leith consisted of the following electoral wards of the City of Edinburgh Council:

- In full: Leith Walk
- In part: Forth, Inverleith, Leith

== Member of the Scottish Parliament ==
Election	Member	Party
2011	Malcolm Chisholm	Labour
2016	Ben Macpherson	SNP

== Election results ==
=== 2020s ===
2021 Scottish Parliament election: Edinburgh Northern and Leith
Party	Candidate	Constituency			Regional		
Party	Candidate	Votes	%	±%	Votes	%	±%
SNP	Ben Macpherson (Note: Incumbent member for this constituency)	22,443	47.9	▲1.2	18,174	38.7	▲2.4
Labour	Katrina Faccenda	10,874	23.2	▼5.3	8,726	18.6	▼1.2
Green	Lorna Slater	6,116	13.1	New	9,243	19.7	▲1.6
Conservative	Callum Laidlaw	5,052	10.8	▼5.6	6,293	13.4	▼4.4
Liberal Democrats	Rebecca Bell	2,035	4.3	▼0.5	2,177	4.6	▲1.0
Alba					770	1.6	New
Animal Welfare					264	0.6	New
All for Unity					220	0.5	New
Scottish Family					212	0.5	New
Freedom Alliance (UK)	Jon Pullman	314	0.7	New	180	0.4	New
Women's Equality					167	0.4	▼1.4
Reform					110	0.2	New
Scottish Libertarian					83	0.2	New
Communist					80	0.2	New
Abolish the Scottish Parliament					78	0.2	New
Independent	Ashley Graczyk				58	0.1	New
UKIP					43	0.1	▼1.4
SDP					23	0.0	New
Renew					14	0.0	New
Majority		11,569	24.7	▲6.5			
Valid votes		46,834			46,915		
Invalid votes		155			85		
Turnout		46,989	63.0	▲7.5	47,000	63.0	▲7.6
SNP hold		Swing		▲3.3			

=== 2010s ===
2016 Scottish Parliament election: Edinburgh Northern and Leith
Party	Candidate	Constituency			Regional		
Party	Candidate	Votes	%	±%	Votes	%	±%
SNP	Ben Macpherson	17,322	46.7	▲7.0	13,495	36.3	▼1.2
Labour	Lesley Hinds	10,576	28.5	▼13.1	7,364	19.8	▼4.4
Green					6,744	18.1	▲5.8
Conservative	Ian McGill	6,081	16.4	▲6.9	6,623	17.8	▲8.7
Liberal Democrats	Martin Veart	1,779	4.8	▼4.4	1,349	3.6	▼2.2
Independent	Jack Caldwell	1,344	3.6	New			
Women's Equality					658	1.8	New
UKIP					568	1.5	▲1.0
RISE					293	0.8	New
Solidarity					120	0.3	▲0.1
Majority		6,746	18.2	N/A			
Valid votes		37,102			37,214		
Invalid votes		260			73		
Turnout		37,362	55.5	▲3.0	37,287	55.4	▲2.8
SNP gain from Labour		Swing					

2011 Scottish Parliament election: Edinburgh Northern and Leith
Party	Candidate	Constituency			Region		
Party	Candidate	Votes	%	±%	Votes	%	±%
Labour	Malcolm Chisholm (Note: Incumbent member on the party list, or for another constituency)	12,858	41.6	N/A	7,508	24.2	N/A
SNP	Shirley-Anne Somerville	12,263	39.7	N/A	11,610	37.5	N/A
Green					3,812	12.3	N/A
Conservative	Sheila Low	2,928	9.5	N/A	2,803	9.1	N/A
Independent	Margo MacDonald				2,157	7.0	N/A
Liberal Democrats	Dan Farthing	2,836	9.2	N/A	1,805	5.8	N/A
All-Scotland Pensioners Party					266	0.9	N/A
Scottish Socialist					211	0.7	N/A
Socialist Labour					177	0.6	N/A
UKIP					155	0.5	N/A
BNP					148	0.5	N/A
Liberal					91	0.3	N/A
Scottish Christian					90	0.3	N/A
Solidarity					57	0.2	N/A
CPA					41	0.1	N/A
Independent	Ken O'Neil				17	0.1	N/A
Independent	David Hogg				11	0.0	N/A
Independent	Mev Brown				7	0.0	N/A
Majority		595	1.9	N/A			
Valid votes		30,885			30,966		
Invalid votes		172			114		
Turnout		31,057	52.5	N/A	31,080	52.6	N/A
Labour win (new seat)							

== See also ==
- Politics of Edinburgh
