= List of Scottish Parliament constituencies and electoral regions (2026) =

The Scottish Parliament (Holyrood) has 73 constituencies, each electing one Member of the Scottish Parliament (MSP) by the plurality (first past the post) system of election, and eight additional members regions, each electing seven additional MSPs using the D'Hondt method of allocating from party lists to produce a form of proportional representation. The total number of parliamentary seats is 129. For links to lists of MSPs, see Member of the Scottish Parliament and Scottish Parliament constituencies and electoral regions.

The Scotland Act 1998 as amended by the Scottish Elections (Reform) Act 2020 requires Boundaries Scotland to regularly review boundaries of all constituencies; the Second Periodic Review of constituency and regional boundaries began in September 2022 and was completed by May 2025. The proposals were formally approved in October 2025, establishing the new constituencies and regions that will be first contested at the 2026 Scottish Parliament election.

== Constituencies ==
| Constituency | Council area or areas | Additional members region | Electorate (1 September 2022) |
|---|---|---|---|
| Aberdeen Central BC | Aberdeen City | North East Scotland | 55,994 |
| Aberdeen Deeside and North Kincardine CC | Aberdeen City, Aberdeenshire | North East Scotland | 61,544 |
| Aberdeen Donside BC | Aberdeen City | North East Scotland | 62,531 |
| Aberdeenshire East CC | Aberdeenshire | North East Scotland | 61,078 |
| Aberdeenshire West CC | Aberdeenshire | North East Scotland | 59,983 |
| Airdrie CC | North Lanarkshire | Central Scotland and Lothians West | 54,205 |
| Almond Valley CC | West Lothian | Central Scotland and Lothians West | 68,871 |
| Angus North and Mearns CC | Aberdeenshire, Angus | North East Scotland | 55,006 |
| Angus South CC | Angus | North East Scotland | 58,622 |
| Argyll and Bute CC | Argyll and Bute | Highlands and Islands | 49,535 |
| Ayr BC | South Ayrshire | South Scotland | 62,566 |
| Banffshire and Buchan Coast CC | Aberdeenshire, Moray | North East Scotland | 61,591 |
| Bathgate CC | West Lothian | Central Scotland and Lothians West | 66,803 |
| Caithness, Sutherland and Ross CC | Highland | Highlands and Islands | 56,532 |
| Carrick, Cumnock and Doon Valley CC | East Ayrshire, South Ayrshire | South Scotland | 59,218 |
| Clackmannanshire and Dunblane CC | Clackmannanshire, Stirling | Mid Scotland and Fife | 56,732 |
| Clydebank and Milngavie BC | East Dunbartonshire, West Dunbartonshire | West Scotland | 55,112 |
| Clydesdale CC | South Lanarkshire | South Scotland | 61,011 |
| Coatbridge and Chryston BC | North Lanarkshire | Central Scotland and Lothians West | 56,877 |
| Cowdenbeath CC | Fife | Mid Scotland and Fife | 56,363 |
| Cumbernauld and Kilsyth BC | North Lanarkshire | Central Scotland and Lothians West | 51,210 |
| Cunninghame North CC | North Ayrshire | West Scotland | 56,604 |
| Cunninghame South CC | North Ayrshire, East Ayrshire | West Scotland | 59,525 |
| Dumbarton CC | Argyll and Bute, West Dunbartonshire | West Scotland | 56,129 |
| Dumfriesshire CC | Dumfries and Galloway | South Scotland | 61,848 |
| Dundee City East BC | Dundee City | North East Scotland | 56,030 |
| Dundee City West BC | Dundee City | North East Scotland | 56,705 |
| Dunfermline CC | Fife | Mid Scotland and Fife | 62,615 |
| East Kilbride BC | South Lanarkshire | South Scotland | 60,763 |
| East Lothian Coast and Lammermuirs CC | East Lothian | Edinburgh and Lothians East | 57,511 |
| Eastwood CC | East Renfrewshire | West Scotland | 56,258 |
| Edinburgh Central BC | City of Edinburgh | Edinburgh and Lothians East | 64,114 |
| Edinburgh Eastern, Musselburgh and Tranent BC | City of Edinburgh, East Lothian | Edinburgh and Lothians East | 57,320 |
| Edinburgh North Eastern and Leith BC | City of Edinburgh | Edinburgh and Lothians East | 64,322 |
| Edinburgh North Western BC | City of Edinburgh | Edinburgh and Lothians East | 60,717 |
| Edinburgh Northern BC | City of Edinburgh | Edinburgh and Lothians East | 63,281 |
| Edinburgh South Western BC | City of Edinburgh | Edinburgh and Lothians East | 59,967 |
| Edinburgh Southern BC | City of Edinburgh | Edinburgh and Lothians East | 62,177 |
| Ettrick, Roxburgh and Berwickshire CC | Scottish Borders | South Scotland | 55,131 |
| Falkirk East and Linlithgow CC | Falkirk, West Lothian | Central Scotland and Lothians West | 67,341 |
| Falkirk West BC | Falkirk | Central Scotland and Lothians West | 68,831 |
| Fife North East CC | Fife | Mid Scotland and Fife | 56,669 |
| Galloway and West Dumfries CC | Dumfries and Galloway | South Scotland | 57,094 |
| Glasgow Anniesland BC | Glasgow City | Glasgow | 60,545 |
| Glasgow Baillieston and Shettleston BC | Glasgow City | Glasgow | 58,936 |
| Glasgow Cathcart and Pollok BC | Glasgow City | Glasgow | 66,213 |
| Glasgow Central BC | Glasgow City | Glasgow | 61,723 |
| Glasgow Easterhouse and Springburn BC | Glasgow City | Glasgow | 59,829 |
| Glasgow Kelvin and Maryhill BC | Glasgow City | Glasgow | 64,836 |
| Glasgow Southside BC | Glasgow City | Glasgow | 65,486 |
| Hamilton, Larkhall and Stonehouse BC | South Lanarkshire | South Scotland | 59,596 |
| Inverclyde CC | Inverclyde | West Scotland | 60,794 |
| Inverness and Nairn CC | Highland | Highlands and Islands | 65,464 |
| Kilmarnock and Irvine Valley CC | East Ayrshire | South Scotland | 57,515 |
| Kirkcaldy BC | Fife | Mid Scotland and Fife | 60,642 |
| Mid Fife and Glenrothes CC | Fife | Mid Scotland and Fife | 54,098 |
| Midlothian North CC | Midlothian | Edinburgh and Lothians East | 53,996 |
| Midlothian South, Tweeddale and Lauderdale | Midlothian, Scottish Borders | South Scotland | 60,183 |
| Moray | Moray | Highlands and Islands | 63,123 |
| Motherwell and Wishaw BC | North Lanarkshire | Central Scotland and Lothians West | 57,740 |
| Na h-Eileanan an Iar CC | Na h-Eileanan Siar | Highlands and Islands | 21,769 |
| Orkney Islands CC | Orkney Islands | Highlands and Islands | 17,696 |
| Paisley BC | Renfrewshire | West Scotland | 58,570 |
| Perthshire North CC | Perth and Kinross | Mid Scotland and Fife | 59,944 |
| Perthshire South and Kinross-shire CC | Perth and Kinross | Mid Scotland and Fife | 60,095 |
| Renfrewshire North and Cardonald BC | Renfrewshire, Glasgow City | West Scotland | 63,745 |
| Renfrewshire West and Levern Valley CC | East Renfrewshire, Renfrewshire | West Scotland | 60,982 |
| Rutherglen and Cambuslang BC | South Lanarkshire | Glasgow | 62,888 |
| Shetland Islands CC | Shetland Islands | Highlands and Islands | 17,965 |
| Skye, Lochaber and Badenoch CC | Highland | Highlands and Islands | 67,222 |
| Stirling CC | Stirling | Mid Scotland and Fife | 54,302 |
| Strathkelvin and Bearsden CC | East Dunbartonshire | West Scotland | 63,895 |
| Uddingston and Bellshill BC | North Lanarkshire, South Lanarkshire | Central Scotland and Lothians West | 58,839 |

=== Electoral regions ===
The Boundary Commission also recommended changes to the electoral regions used to elect list members of the Scottish Parliament. The regions from 2026 onwards are:

| Region | Constituencies | Map |
|---|---|---|
| Central Scotland and Lothians West (2022 electorate: 550,717) | Airdrie; Almond Valley; Bathgate; Coatbridge and Chryston; Cumbernauld and Kilsyth; Falkirk East and Linlithgow; Falkirk West; Motherwell and Wishaw; Uddingston and Bellshill | |
| Edinburgh and Lothians East (2022 electorate: 543,001) | East Lothian Coast and Lammermuirs; Edinburgh Central; Edinburgh Eastern, Musselburgh and Tranent; Edinburgh North Eastern and Leith; Edinburgh North Western; Edinburgh Northern; Edinburgh South Western; Edinburgh Southern; Midlothian North | |
| Glasgow (2022 electorate: 500,456) | Glasgow Anniesland; Glasgow Baillieston and Shettleston; Glasgow Cathcart and Pollok; Glasgow Central; Glasgow Easterhouse and Springburn; Glasgow Kelvin and Maryhill; Glasgow Southside; Rutherglen and Cambuslang | |
| Highlands and Islands (2022 electorate: 359,306) | Argyll and Bute; Caithness, Sutherland and Ross; Inverness and Nairn; Moray; Na h-Eileanan an Iar; Orkney Islands; Shetland Islands; Skye, Lochaber and Badenoch | |
| Mid Scotland and Fife (2022 electorate: 521,460) | Clackmannanshire and Dunblane; Cowdenbeath; Dunfermline; Fife North East; Kirkcaldy; Mid Fife and Glenrothes; Perthshire North; Perthshire South and Kinross-shire; Stirling | |
| North East Scotland (2022 electorate: 589,084) | Aberdeen Central; Aberdeen Deeside and North Kincardine; Aberdeen Donside; Aberdeenshire East; Aberdeenshire West; Angus North and Mearns; Angus South; Banffshire and Buchan Coast; Dundee City East; Dundee City West | |
| South Scotland (2022 electorate: 594,925) | Ayr; Carrick, Cumnock and Doon Valley; Clydesdale; Dumfriesshire; East Kilbride; Ettrick, Roxburgh and Berwickshire; Galloway and West Dumfries; Hamilton, Larkhall and Stonehouse; Kilmarnock and Irvine Valley; Midlothian South, Tweeddale and Lauderdale | |
| West Scotland (2022 electorate: 591,614) | Clydebank and Milngavie; Cunninghame North; Cunninghame South; Dumbarton; Eastwood; Inverclyde; Paisley; Renfrewshire North and Cardonald; Renfrewshire West and Levern Valley; Strathkelvin and Bearsden | |
