= Irshad Ahmed (politician) =

Scottish politician

Irshad Ahmed MSP
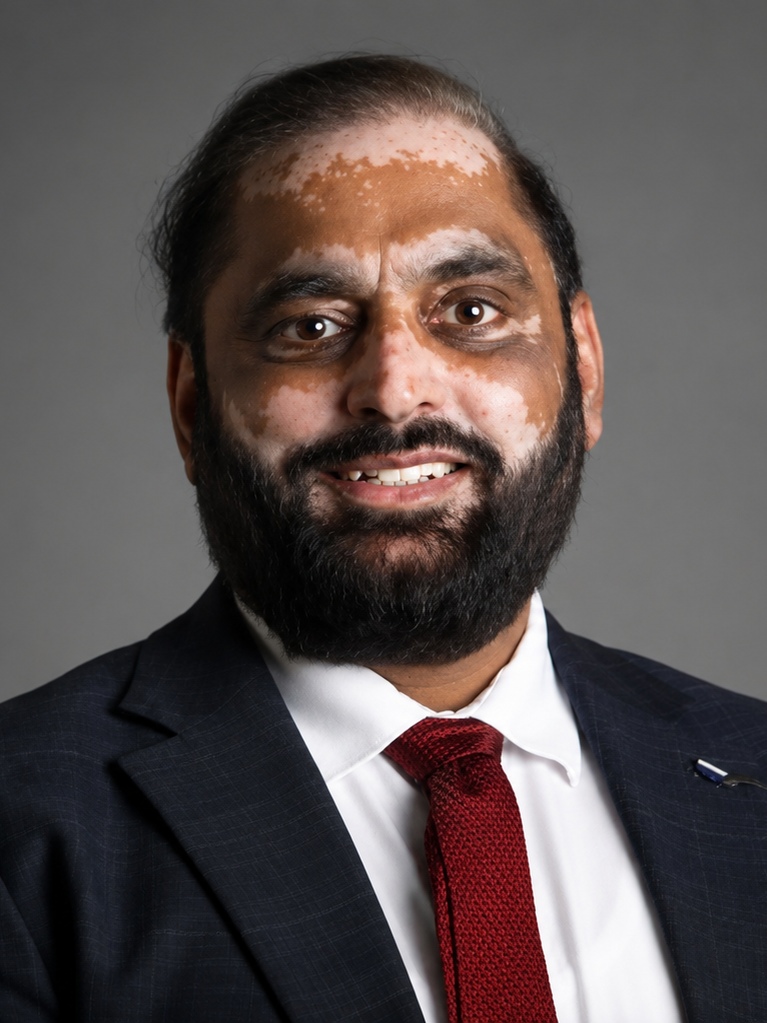
- Official portrait, 2026

Member of the Scottish Parliament for Edinburgh and Lothians East (1 of 7 Regional MSPs)
- Incumbent
- Assumed office 7 May 2026

Personal details
- Born: Faisalabad, Pakistan
- Party: Scottish Labour (since 2024)
- Other political affiliations: Scottish National Party (2005–2021); Alba (2021–2024)

Irshad Ahmed is a Pakistani businessman and Scottish Labour politician who has been a Member of Scottish Parliament for Edinburgh and Lothians East since 2026.

== Early life and career ==
Ahmed was born in Faisalabad, Pakistan and moved to Edinburgh in 1993. He is a businessman. As of 2026, he is sub-postmaster of the Fisherrow Post Office in Musselburgh.

== Politics ==
He had been a member of the Scottish National Party for over 16 years, standing third on the SNP's Lothian regional list in 2016. In March 2021, after being listed seventh on the SNP's Lothian candidates, he defected to the newly formed Alba Party, citing the need for a pro-independence supermajority in the Scottish Parliament.

In the 2021 Scottish Parliament election, he was fourth on the list for the Alba Party in the Lothian electoral region.

He joined Labour around the time of the 2024 United Kingdom general election and in 2026 he defeated Daniel Johnson and Martin Whitfield to be the top candidate of the regional list in Edinburgh and Lothians East for the Scottish Parliament. Following his selection, Scottish Labour's Governance and Legal Unit received a formal complaint alleging voter irregularities in the selection contest, including claims that large numbers of new members had been signed up to support him, and that some listed members could not be verified at their registered addresses. Anas Sarwar backed his candidacy.

The 2026 Scottish Parliament election was held on 7 May 2026. Ahmed was Scottish Labour's constituency candidate for the Edinburgh North Western constituency for the 2026 Scottish Parliament election; he received 1,879 votes (4.7%). However, he was elected as a regional list MSP, with Scottish Labour receiving 58,696 votes (18.4%).
