= Angela Ross =

Scottish politician

Angela Ross MSP
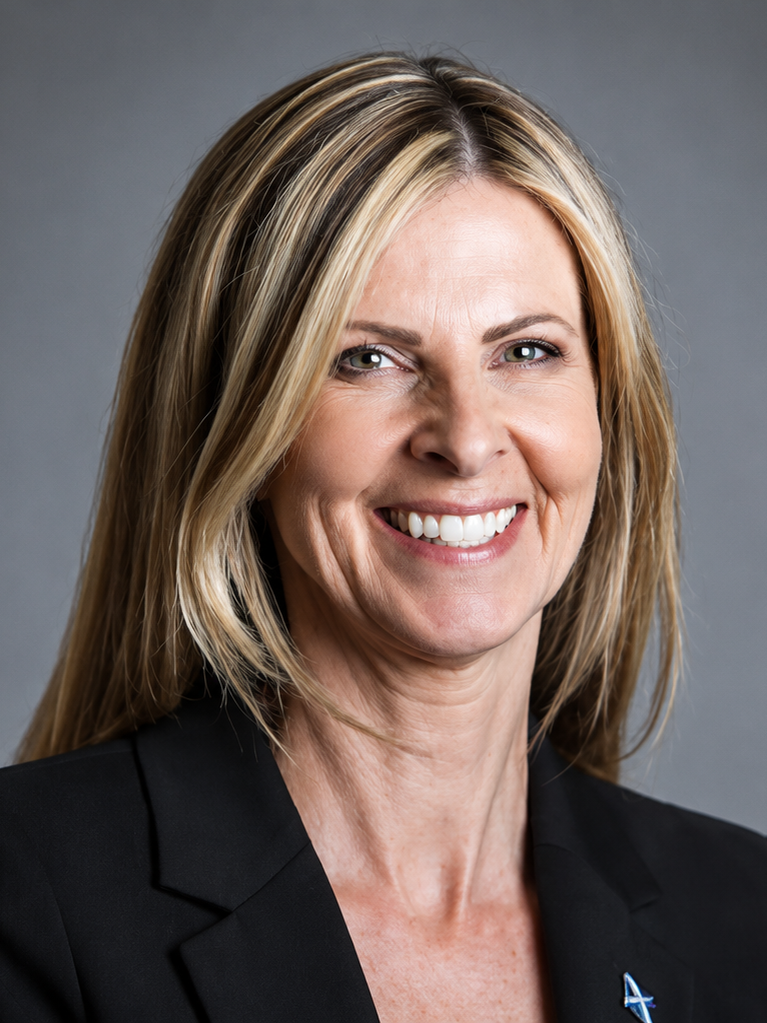
- Official portrait, 2026

Member of the Scottish Parliament for Edinburgh and Lothians East (1 of 7 Regional MSPs)
- Incumbent
- Assumed office 7 May 2026

Reform Scotland Shadow portfolios
- 2026-present: Shadow Cabinet Secretary for Finance and Economy
- 2026: Shadow Cabinet Secretary for Education

Personal details
- Party: Reform UK

Angela Ross is a Scottish politician who has served as a Member of the Scottish Parliament for Edinburgh and Lothians East since May 2026. She is a member of Reform Party Scotland.

== Biography ==
Ross hails from East Lothian. Ross is a teacher and fraud awareness expert. She is also a business owner.

In the 2026 Scottish Parliament election, Ross was elected as the top candidate on the regional list for Edinburgh and Lothians East. She stood as the constituency candidate in Edinburgh Eastern, Musselburgh and Tranent, placing third.
