= Ben Macpherson (politician) =

Scottish politician (born 1984)

Ben Macpherson MSP
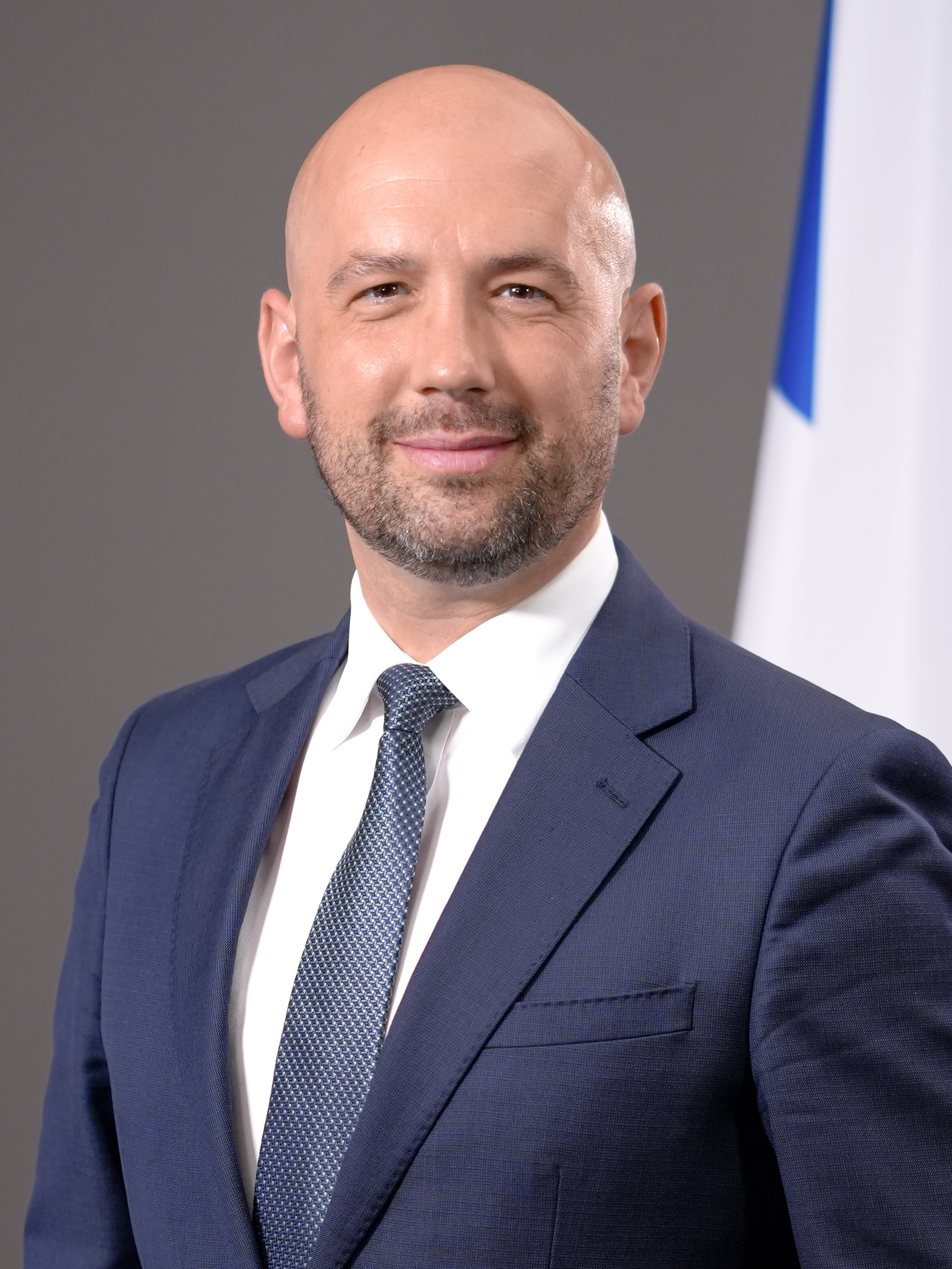
- Official portrait, 2026

Minister for Innovation, Technology and Tertiary Education (Note: Minister for Higher and Further Education from September to May 2026.)
- In office 21 September 2025 – 24 August 2026
- First Minister: John Swinney
- Preceded by: Graeme Dey
- Succeeded by: Alyn Smith

Minister for Social Security and Local Government
- In office 20 May 2021 – 29 March 2023
- First Minister: Nicola Sturgeon
- Preceded by: Kevin Stewart
- Succeeded by: Joe FitzPatrick

Minister for Public Finance and Migration
- In office 17 February 2020 – 20 May 2021
- First Minister: Nicola Sturgeon
- Preceded by: Kate Forbes
- Succeeded by: Tom Arthur

Minister for Europe, Migration and International Development
- In office 27 June 2018 – 17 February 2020
- First Minister: Nicola Sturgeon
- Preceded by: Alasdair Allan
- Succeeded by: Jenny Gilruth

Member of the Scottish Parliament for Edinburgh North Eastern and Leith Edinburgh Northern and Leith (2016–2026)
- Incumbent
- Assumed office 5 May 2016
- Preceded by: Malcolm Chisholm
- Majority: 3,061 (8.0%)

Personal details
- Born: Ben Macpherson; 12 July 1984 (age 42) Edinburgh, Scotland
- Party: Scottish National Party
- Website: benmacpherson.scot

Ben Macpherson (born July 1984) is a Scottish politician who served as the Minister for Innovation, Technology and Tertiary Education (Note: Minister for Higher and Further Education from September to May 2026.) from 2025 to 2026. A member of the Scottish National Party (SNP), he has been the Member of the Scottish Parliament (MSP) for the Edinburgh North Eastern and Leith constituency since 2026. He previously represented Edinburgh Northern and Leith from 2016 to 2026.

He previously served as Minister for Social Security and Local Government in the Scottish Government from May 2021 to March 2023, having previously served as Minister for Europe, Migration and International Development (June 2018-February 2020), Minister for Public Finance and Migration (February 2020-December 2020) and Minister for Rural Affairs and the Natural Environment (December 2020-May 2021).

== Early life and education ==
Macpherson attended Flora Stevenson Primary School and then George Heriot's School. He then graduated from the University of York with a degree in philosophy and politics. He later studied law at the University of Edinburgh.

As a youth, Macpherson was involved in the local Labour Party. When he was sixteen, in 2002 he did work experience with his local MSP Malcolm Chisholm, whose constituency he later represented. He became a member of the SNP in 2005, having left Labour in 2003 due to the Iraq War and lack of sufficient progress on social justice.

He worked in a number of different roles and sectors, including time as a bartender, for a wave energy company and as a clerical assistant at James Gillespie's High School. He then trained as a lawyer, working for the firm Brodies.

In the summer of 2004 he walked from Edinburgh to London to raise awareness of the annual International Day of Peace. Growing up he was a keen footballer and played for several teams in Edinburgh and the University of York's 1st Team. In 2003, he lived briefly in China, working as a volunteer English teacher in Wujiang.

== Political career ==
In August 2015, Macpherson was selected from a field of ten contenders as the SNP candidate for the Edinburgh Northern and Leith constituency, having been supported by former SNP leader Alex Salmond and Edinburgh Southern MSP Jim Eadie. Tipped as "one of the SNP’s rising stars", at the May 2016 Scottish Parliament election Macpherson won the seat with a 10% swing from Labour. He succeeded Malcolm Chisholm, who had retired.

As a backbencher, he served on the Justice Committee and the Social Security Committee, and was a Parliamentary Liaison Officer to the First Minister. On 27 June 2018, he was appointed as Minister for Europe, Migration and International Development in the Scottish Government. He served in this role until February 2020, when he became Minister for Public Finance and Migration. In December 2020, he was appointed Minister for Rural Affairs and the Natural Environment.

Macpherson was re-elected at the 2021 Scottish Parliament election, when his constituency was the last to declare a result. In the subsequent ministerial reshuffle, Macpherson was appointed on 19 May as Minister for Social Security and Local Government. He left the role on 29 March 2023, after declining to serve in the Yousaf Government.

Macpherson was appointed minister for Higher and Further Education by John Swinney in September 2025. He was re-elected at the 2026 Scottish Parliament election in Edinburgh North Eastern and Leith. On 24 August 2026, he resigned from the cabinet. He cited personal reasons.

Scottish Parliament
Preceded by Malcolm Chisholm	Member of the Scottish Parliament for Edinburgh Northern and Leith; 2016–present	Incumbent
Political offices
Preceded by Alasdair Allan	Minister for Europe, Migration and International Development; 2018–2020	Succeeded by Jenny Gilruth
Preceded by Kate Forbes	Minister for Public Finance and Migration; 2020–2021	Succeeded by Tom Arthur
Preceded by Kevin Stewart	Minister for Social Security and Local Government; 2021–2023	Succeeded by Joe FitzPatrick
