= Kate Nevens =

Scottish politician (born 1982)

Kate Nevens MSP
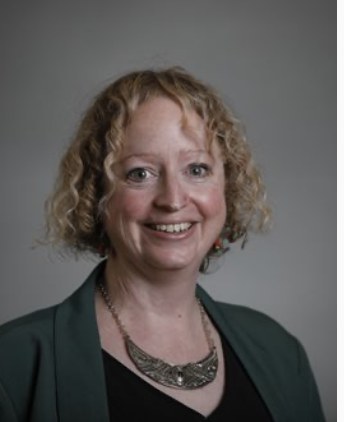
- Nevens in 2026

Member of the Scottish Parliament for Edinburgh and Lothians East (1 of 7 Regional MSPs)
- Incumbent
- Assumed office 7 May 2026

Personal details
- Born: 1 January 1982 (age 44)
- Party: Scottish Greens

Kate Nevens (born 1 January 1982) is a Scottish politician who has served as a Member of the Scottish Parliament for Edinburgh and Lothians East since May 2026. She is a member of the Scottish Greens.

== Biography ==
Kate Nevens was born on 1 January 1982.

Before her election as MSP, Nevens was the Scottish Green candidate for Corstorphine/Murrayfield ward in the 2017 City of Edinburgh Council election, and lost on the 5th count. She was then placed third on the party's list for the Lothian electoral region at the 2021 Scottish Parliament, and subsequently did not win a seat. She was also the party's candidate for Edinburgh South at the 2019 UK General Election, coming in 5th place with 1,357 votes.

Nevens was the second placed candidate on the regional list for Edinburgh and Lothians East in the 2026 Scottish Parliament election. She was elected as a list MSP. During the 2026 election, Nevens stated that she supports prison abolition. She was also the constituency candidate in Edinburgh North Eastern and Leith, placing second.
