= Edinburgh and Lothians East =

Electoral region of the Scottish Parliament

- electoral region for the Scottish Parliament
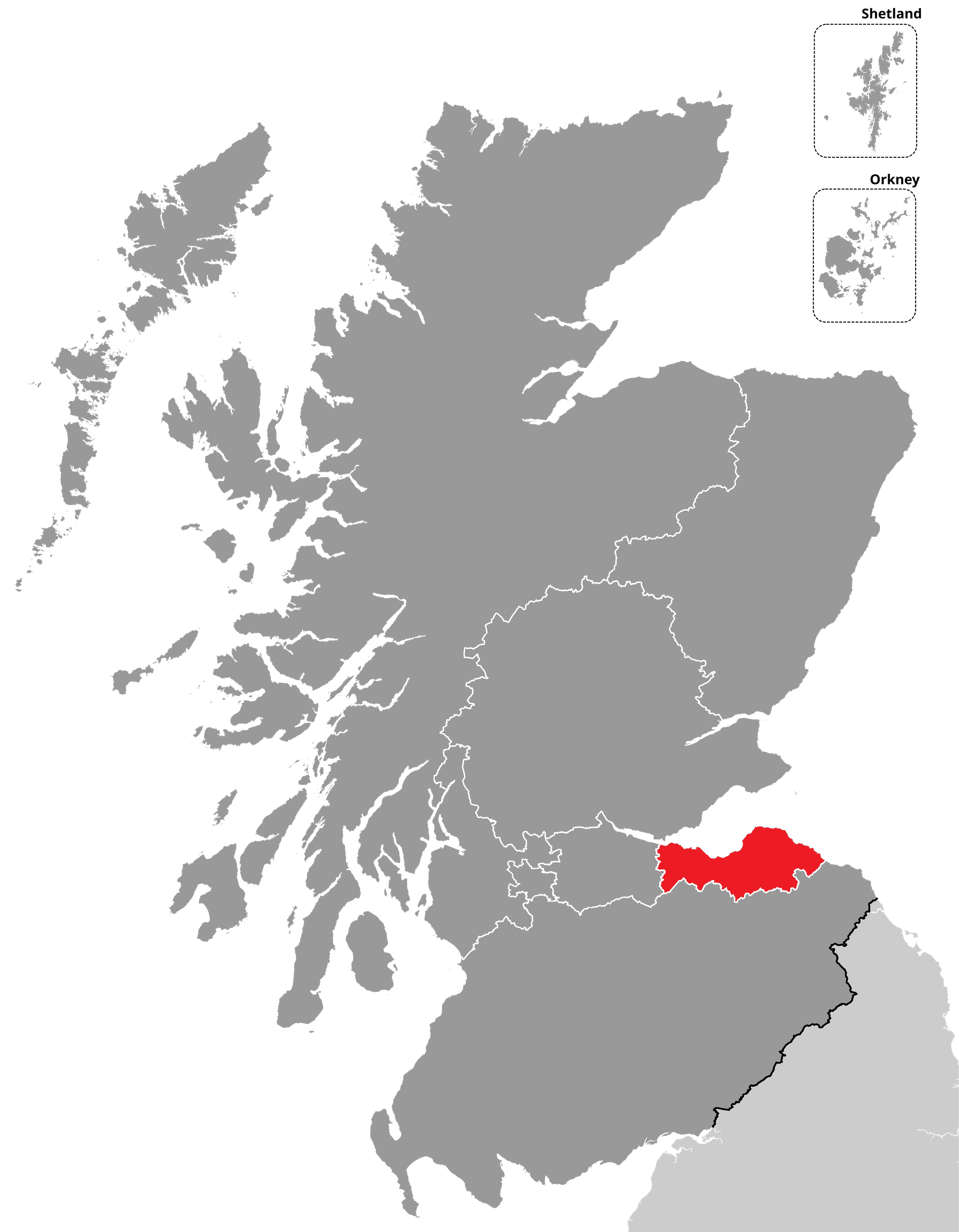
- Edinburgh and Lothians East shown within Scotland
- Council areas: City of Edinburgh; East Lothian; Midlothian (part)
- Electorate: 543,001 (2022)

Current electoral region
- Created: 2026
- Constituencies: East Lothian Coast and Lammermuirs; Edinburgh Central; Edinburgh Eastern, Musselburgh and Tranent; Edinburgh North Eastern and Leith; Edinburgh North Western; Edinburgh Northern; Edinburgh Southern; Edinburgh South Western; Midlothian North
- Created from: Lothian, South Scotland

Edinburgh and Lothians East is an electoral region of the Scottish Parliament. Under the additional-member electoral system used for elections to the Scottish Parliament, the region elects seven additional members, in addition to the nine constituency MSPs, to produce a form of proportional representation for the region as a whole. The seat was first contested at the 2026 Scottish Parliament election.

The region was created by the Second Periodic Review of constituency and regional boundaries, the results of which were formally approved in October 2025.

== Boundaries ==
The region includes all of the City of Edinburgh and East Lothian council areas, and parts of the Midlothian council area. It is based on the city of Edinburgh, and covers much of the former Lothian region. Compared to the former Lothian region, Edinburgh and Lothians East excludes West Lothian, which is now in the Central Scotland and Lothians West region, but includes East Lothian, which was formerly in South Scotland.

== Constituencies ==
The region contains nine constituencies:

Region	Constituencies from 2026
	1. East Lothian Coast and Lammermuirs; 2. Edinburgh Eastern, Musselburgh and Tranent; 3. Edinburgh Central; 4. Edinburgh North Eastern and Leith; 5. Edinburgh North Western; 6. Edinburgh Northern; 7. Edinburgh Southern; 8. Edinburgh South Western; 9. Midlothian North

== Members of the Scottish Parliament ==
=== Constituency MSPs ===
Term	Election	East Lothian Coast and Lammermuirs	Edinburgh Eastern, Musselburgh and Tranent	Edinburgh Central	Edinburgh North Eastern and Leith	Edinburgh North Western	Edinburgh Northern	Edinburgh Southern	Edinburgh South Western	Midlothian North
7th	2026	Paul McLennan (SNP)	Kate Campbell (SNP)	Lorna Slater (Green)	Ben Macpherson (SNP)	Alex Cole-Hamilton (Lib Dem)	Sanne Dijkstra-Downie (Lib Dem)	Daniel Johnson (Labour)	Simita Kumar (SNP)	Colin Beattie (SNP)

=== Regional list MSPs ===
N.B. This table is for presentation purposes only

Parliament	MSP	MSP	MSP	MSP	MSP	MSP	MSP
7th (2026–)	Kate Nevens (Green)	Q Manivannan (Green)	Kayleigh Kinross-O'Neill (Green)	Irshad Ahmed (Labour)	Katherine Sangster (Labour)	Angela Ross (Reform)	Miles Briggs (Conservative)

== Election results ==
=== 2026 Scottish Parliament election ===
==== Constituency results ====
2026 Scottish Parliament election: Edinburgh and Lothians East
Constituency	Elected member	Result
East Lothian Coast and Lammermuirs	Paul McLennan	SNP hold
Edinburgh Eastern, Musselburgh and Tranent	Kate Campbell	SNP hold
Edinburgh Central	Lorna Slater	Green gain from SNP
Edinburgh North Eastern and Leith	Ben Macpherson	SNP hold
Edinburgh North Western	Alex Cole-Hamilton	Liberal Democrats hold
Edinburgh Northern	Sanne Dijkstra-Downie	Liberal Democrats gain from SNP
Edinburgh Southern	Daniel Johnson	Labour hold
Edinburgh South Western	Simita Kumar	SNP hold
Midlothian North	Colin Beattie	SNP hold

==== Additional member results ====
2026 Scottish Parliament election: Edinburgh and Lothians East
List	Candidates	Votes	Of total (%)	± from prev.
SNP	Tommy Sheppard, Deidre Brock, Simita Kumar, Angus Robertson, Paul McLennan, Colin Beattie, Lyn Jardine	69,655	21.8	▼12.2
Green	Lorna Slater, Kate Nevens, Q Manivannan, Kayleigh Kinross-O'Neill, Chas Booth, Adam Al-Khateb, Jo Phillips, Mridul Machindra Wadhwa, Dan Heap, Astri JS Kvassnes, Alex Staniforth, Mariusz Artur Cebulski	67,877	21.2	▲7.9
Labour	Irshad Ahmed, Katherine Sangster, Daniel Johnson, Catriona Munro, Martin Whitfield, Caitlin Stott, James Dalgleish, Eleanor Ryan-Saha, Oliver Thomas	58,696	18.4	▼1.3
Liberal Democrats	Sanne Dijkstra-Downie, Jane Patricia Alliston Pickard, Charles Christopher Dundas, Lewis James Younie, Jenny Claire Marr Butler, Liss Owen, Alan Grant	42,937	13.4	▲5.7
Reform	Angela Ross, Pal Chidambaram, Nigel Douglas, David Lees, Charles Turner, Andrew McLaughlin, Gary Neill, David Thomson, Cameron Rose	33,341	10.4	▲10.2
Conservative	Miles Briggs, Sue Webber, Marie-Clair Munro, Christopher Cowdy, Jo Mowat, Tim Jones, Rachel Cairns, Haris Young	29,223	9.1	▼11.4
Independent Green Voice	Megan Burns	2,357	0.7	▲0.7
Independent	Jeremy Balfour	2,261	0.7	▲0.7
Animal Welfare	Mark Scott, Lee Christopher Williscroft-Ferris, Vivienne Margaret Moir, Jane Catherine Smith	2,032	0.6	▲0.6
Independent	Ash Regan	1,904	0.6	▲0.6
Scottish Family	Philip Holden, Niel Deepnarain, Mairi Lucas, Helen MacEachen, Peter James Cox	1,684	0.5	▲0.5
AtLS	Craig Murray, Joe Smith, Hugh Kerr, James Daly, Anna Caro	1,508	0.5	▲0.5
Scottish Socialist	Colin Fox, Natalie Reid, Ally Maxwell	1,099	0.3	▲0.3
Edinburgh & East Lothian People	Marc Richard Wilkinson, David Henry Alan Sisson	1,073	0.3	▲0.3
ISP	John Hannah	871	0.3	▲0.3
Communist	Chris Cullen	672	0.2	▲0.2
Workers Party	David Henry, Abu Meron	647	0.2	▲0.2
Independent	Bonnie Prince Bob	632	0.2	▲0.2
Scottish Libertarian	Tam Laird, Gary Finlayson Smith	341	0.1	▲0.1
Advance UK	Sean Moffat	301	0.1	▲0.1
Equality	David Renton, Laura Mackintosh, Caitlin Dykes-Johnson	276	0.1	▲0.1
Independent	Morgwn Carter Davies	197	0.1	▲0.1

== See also ==
- List of Scottish Parliament constituencies and electoral regions (2026–)
