= Q Manivannan =

Member of the Scottish Parliament since 2026

Q Manivannan MSP
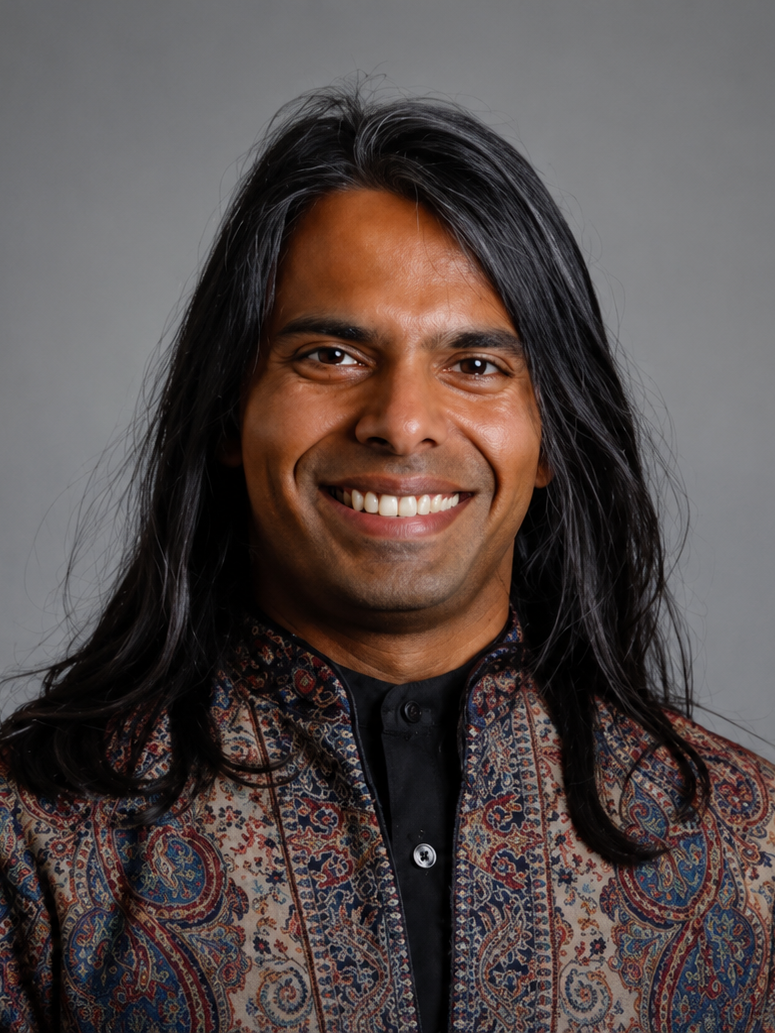
- Official portrait, 2026

Member of the Scottish Parliament for Edinburgh and Lothians East (1 of 7 Regional MSPs)
- Incumbent
- Assumed office 7 May 2026

Personal details
- Born: 1996 (age 29–30) Tamil Nadu, India
- Party: Scottish Greens
- Education: O. P. Jindal Global University (BA); Trinity College Dublin (MPhil); University of St Andrews (PhD)

Q Manivannan (born 1996 or 1997) is a Scottish Greens politician serving as a Member of the Scottish Parliament for the Edinburgh and Lothians East region since the 2026 Scottish Parliament election. Although of Indian citizenship rather than being a British citizen or a permanent resident, Manivannan was eligible to stand for election following changes to the law in 2025. Manivannan is nonbinary, and is one of the first two openly transgender people elected to the Scottish Parliament.

== Early life and education ==
Manivannan was born in the Tamil Nadu state of India. Their parents were Manivannan Dasarathi, a former tennis champion and owner of an advisory firm, and Rajachitra Manivannan, an academic. They attended Bhavan's Rajaji Vidyashram, a private school in Chennai.

They then studied liberal arts and humanities at O. P. Jindal Global University in Delhi, graduating with a Bachelor of Arts (BA) degree in 2018. While at O. P. Jindal, Manivannan was engaged as a senior research analyst at the Center for New Economic Studies and as an honorary fellow at the Center for Human Rights Studies. Their academic specialisation was "(un)gendered critiques of international legal frameworks for the protection of indigenous communities in multiple phases of armed conflict" and they were also involved with an academic study on sexual harassment policies in Indian universities. After graduation, Manivannan worked for an education consultancy firm in Delhi which coached India's elite to secure access to prestigious universities across the world, and has maintained close links with the firm since leaving India.

Manivannan moved to Ireland to undertake a Master of Philosophy (MPhil) degree in international peace studies at Trinity College Dublin, graduating in 2021. They moved to Scotland that same year to study for a doctorate in international relations at the University of St Andrews, funded by the ESRC research project "Archiving and (Re)imagining Caregiving as Peacebuilding in Third World Social Movements" from September 2022 to March 2026.

== Political career ==
Manivannan was the Scottish Greens' candidate in the 2025 Fountainbridge/Craiglockhart by-election to the City of Edinburgh Council, finishing in third place.

In the 2026 Scottish Parliament election, Manivannan was third on the Green list for Edinburgh and Lothians East. The Greens won one constituency seat in addition to three more list seats, and therefore Manivannan was elected as a Member of the Scottish Parliament (MSP).

Questions were raised about Manivannan's right to stand as a candidate for the Scottish Parliament as they were fundraising for a graduate visa to remain in the UK after their student visa expires, but had not yet secured it by the time of the election. Senior figures from the SNP, the Conservatives and Reform UK criticised the Scottish Greens for clearing Manivannan to stand given their visa status. In response, the Scottish Greens released a statement that clarified "Q is on a valid visa with the right to work and live in Scotland, and is a Commonwealth citizen". They will, however, have to obtain a new visa during the session of parliament as the term of office is five years.

Manivannan has applied for a graduate visa as well as a global talent visa. Initial reports suggested that they would be eligible to serve out the remainder of their term outside of Scotland regardless of their visa status as MSPs can take part in proceedings remotely and there are no attendance requirements. Further reporting confirmed that "an MSP must have leave to remain to hold office at Holyrood" under the Scotland Act. If Manivannan fails to secure a new visa, they would be disqualified from office and they would be replaced by the Scottish Greens' next candidate on the Edinburgh and Lothians East list, with no by-election needing to take place.

Manivannan is one of the first two openly transgender people elected to the Scottish Parliament, along with fellow Scottish Greens MSP Iris Duane. Following their election, the parliament removed all gender categories from the online listings of MSPs.

== Controversies ==
=== Comments on rape and sexual violence ===
In August 2026, Manivannan faced criticism following the circulation of an excerpt from a 2025 interview on The Subjective Space podcast in which they referred to the "a demonisation of rape in the sense of it is a spectrum", continuing, "It is spectrum, none of which is any less or worse, but it is a spectrum of things that constitute one homogenised word 'rape'". During the interview, Manivannan argued that perpetrators of rape did not necessarily conform to stereotypes and said that "any individual is capable of rape". They also discussed circumstances which they said could lead an individual to commit rape and the rehabilitation of perpetrators.

Scottish Labour MP Tracy Gilbert said that there was "no spectrum of rape" and called on Manivannan to retract and apologise for the remarks. Gilbert also called on Scottish Greens co-leaders Gillian Mackay and Ross Greer to state that the comments did not represent party policy. Scottish Conservative deputy leader Rachael Hamilton criticised the remarks and accused Manivannan of showing insufficient understanding of the trauma experienced by rape victims. Reform UK MSP Senga Beresford described the comments as "abhorrent" and called on the Scottish Greens to suspend the party whip from Manivannan and investigate the remarks.

In September 2026, fellow Scottish Green MSP Holly Bruce criticised the remarks, saying that she was "deeply disappointed" in them and had spoken to Manivannan about the issue.

==== Apology and explanation ====
Following the press attention Manivannan made public apologies, speaking to the Morning Star, Manivannan stated that they were “horrified that my comments were selectively edited in order to mislead people and misrepresent me, but I also accept that my language was abstract in the first place and for that I take full responsibility and am sorry." They went on to explain how they felt the conversation had been taken out of context: "During the interview, I categorically stated that rape in every context is equally serious and harmful. This section of the interview was maliciously left out of clips – with the rest being misrepresented and widely shared out of context, despite my repeated clarifications." They said that their reference to the demonisation of rape concerned stereotypes surrounding perpetrators, arguing that rapists did not necessarily conform to a particular image and that such stereotypes could prevent victims from being believed, going on to explain that their reference to a spectrum concerned what they regarded as narrow legal and societal definitions of rape and sexual violence. Furthermore, Manivannan stated that they themselves were a survivor of sexual abuse, also saying that victims of sexual violence should be believed and that perpetrators should be punished "in the strongest terms". They rejected suggestions that their comments had sought to minimise or excuse rape or sexual assault.

== Personal life ==
Manivannan identifies as nonbinary and queer.
