= Kayleigh Kinross-O'Neill =

Scottish politician

Kayleigh Kinross-O'Neill MSP
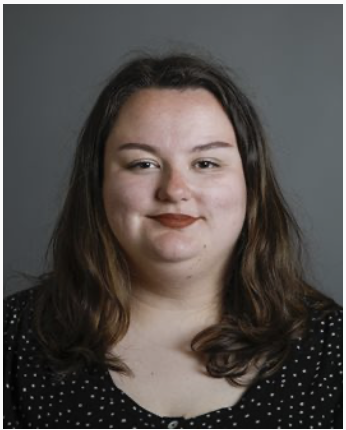

Member of the Scottish Parliament for Edinburgh and Lothians East (1 of 7 Regional MSPs)
- Incumbent
- Assumed office 7 May 2026

Scottish Green Shadow portfolios
- 2026-: Health

Personal details
- Born: 1 March 1999 (age 27) Motherwell, Scotland
- Party: Scottish Greens
- Website: edinburgh.greens.scot/people/kayleigh-oneill/

Kayleigh Kinross-O'Neill (born 1 March 1999) is a Scottish politician who has served as a Member of the Scottish Parliament for Edinburgh and Lothians East since May 2026. She is a member of the Scottish Greens.

== Biography ==
Originally from Motherwell, Kinross-O'Neill moved to Edinburgh for university and went on to work for Euan's Guide and Inclusion Scotland, before serving as office manager for Lorna Slater MSP. A former member of the Scottish National Party, she later joined the Scottish Greens. She is a lesbian and a wheelchair user.

Kinross-O'Neill is a councillor for the Forth ward in Edinburgh. She was also the Scottish Green candidate for Edinburgh North and Leith constituency in the 2024 United Kingdom general election, coming in 3rd place with 5,417 votes.

In the 2026 Scottish Parliament election, she was the constituency candidate in Edinburgh Northern, coming in third place, and was subsequently elected on the regional list for Edinburgh and Lothians East. She will remain a councillor until the 2027 Scottish local elections. Kinross-O'Neill is currently the Scottish Green's spokesperson for Health.
