= Edinburgh Eastern =

Region or constituency of the Scottish Parliament

- Former burgh constituency for the Scottish Parliament

- Edinburgh Eastern shown within the Lothian electoral region and the region shown within Scotland
- Population: 86,488 (2019)

Former constituency
- Created: 2011
- Abolished: 2026
- Council area: City of Edinburgh
- Created from: Edinburgh East and Musselburgh, Edinburgh South, Edinburgh Central
- Replaced by: Edinburgh Eastern, Musselburgh and Tranent, Edinburgh North Eastern and Leith, Edinburgh Southern,

Edinburgh Eastern (Gaelic: Dùn Èideann an Ear) was a constituency of the Scottish Parliament covering part of the council area of Edinburgh. Under the additional-member system used for elections to the Scottish Parliament, the seat elected one Member of the Scottish Parliament (MSP) by the plurality (first past the post) method of election, and was also one of nine constituencies in the Lothian electoral region, which elected seven additional members, in addition to the nine constituency MSPs, to produce a form of proportional representation for the region as a whole.

The constituency was created for the 2011 Scottish Parliament election, and included areas that were formerly part of the constituencies of Edinburgh East and Musselburgh, Edinburgh South, which were abolished, along with an area formerly in the Edinburgh Central constituency, which was retained on new boundaries at this review. As a result of the second periodic review of Scottish Parliament boundaries, the constituency was abolished ahead of the 2026 Scottish Parliament election. The area covered by the former constituency was divided between the new seats of Edinburgh Eastern, Musselburgh and Tranent, Edinburgh North Eastern and Leith and Edinburgh Southern.

The seat had been held by Ash Regan since the 2016 Scottish Parliament election until its abolition in 2026. Regan had originally been elected as an SNP member; she defected to Alba on 28 October 2023, and subsequently left it on 10 October 2025, sitting as an independent from then until the dissolution of parliament.

== Electoral region ==
During the period Edinburgh Eastern was in existence, the other eight constituencies of the Lothian region were: Almond Valley, Edinburgh Central, Edinburgh Northern and Leith, Edinburgh Pentlands, Edinburgh Southern, Edinburgh Western, Linlithgow and Midlothian North and Musselburgh

In this period the region included all of the City of Edinburgh council area, parts of the East Lothian council area, parts of the Midlothian council area and all of the West Lothian council area.

== Constituency boundaries and council area ==
Map of boundaries from 2011

During the period Edinburgh Eastern was in existence, Edinburgh was represented in the Scottish Parliament by six constituencies: Edinburgh Central, Edinburgh Eastern, Edinburgh Northern and Leith, Edinburgh Pentlands, Edinburgh Southern and Edinburgh Western.

The following electoral wards of the City of Edinburgh Council were used to define Edinburgh Eastern in the 2011 boundary review:

- In full: Craigentinny/Duddingston
- In part: City Centre, Leith, Liberton/Gilmerton, Portobello/Craigmillar

== Member of the Scottish Parliament ==
| Election | Member | Party |
|---|---|---|
| 2011 | Kenny MacAskill | SNP |
| 2016 | Ash Regan | SNP |
| 2023 | Ash Regan | Alba |
| 2025 | Ash Regan | Ind. |

== Election results ==
=== 2020s ===
2021 Scottish Parliament election: Edinburgh Eastern
| Party | Candidate | Constituency | | | Regional | | |
| Party | Candidate | Votes | % | ±% | Votes | % | ±% |
|---|---|---|---|---|---|---|---|
| SNP | Ash Regan (Note: Incumbent member for this constituency) | 22,658 | 52.4 | ▲5.1 | 17,182 | 39.6 | ▼1.3 |
| Labour | Bill Cook | 12,541 | 29.0 | ▼4.0 | 9,105 | 21.0 | ▼3.2 |
| Conservative | Graham Hutchison | 5,970 | 13.8 | ▼2.3 | 6,839 | 15.8 | ▼1.0 |
| Green | | | | | 6,292 | 14.5 | ▲3.0 |
| Liberal Democrats | Jill Reilly | 2,035 | 4.7 | ▲1.1 | 1,583 | 3.6 | ▲1.1 |
| Alba | | | | | 866 | 2.0 | New |
| Animal Welfare | | | | | 299 | 0.7 | New |
| Scottish Family | | | | | 279 | 0.6 | New |
| All for Unity | | | | | 271 | 0.6 | New |
| Women's Equality | | | | | 134 | 0.3 | ▼0.9 |
| Freedom Alliance (UK) | | | | | 102 | 0.2 | New |
| Reform | | | | | 96 | 0.2 | New |
| Abolish the Scottish Parliament | | | | | 94 | 0.2 | New |
| Communist | | | | | 66 | 0.2 | New |
| Scottish Libertarian | | | | | 59 | 0.1 | New |
| UKIP | | | | | 64 | 0.1 | ▼1.8 |
| Independent | Ashley Graczyk | | | | 50 | 0.1 | New |
| SDP | | | | | 28 | 0.1 | New |
| Renew | | | | | 12 | 0.0 | New |
| Majority | | 10,117 | 23.4 | ▲9.1 | | | |
| Valid votes | | 43,204 | | | 43,421 | | |
| Invalid votes | | 270 | | | 97 | | |
| Turnout | | 43,474 | 61.0 | ▲4.3 | 43,518 | 61.0 | ▲4.2 |
| SNP hold | | Swing | | ▲4.6 | | | |

=== 2010s ===
2016 Scottish Parliament election: Edinburgh Eastern
| Party | Candidate | Constituency | | | Regional | | |
| Party | Candidate | Votes | % | ±% | Votes | % | ±% |
|---|---|---|---|---|---|---|---|
| SNP | Ash Regan | 16,760 | 47.3 | ▼0.1 | 14,557 | 40.9 | ▲0.6 |
| Labour | Kezia Dugdale (Note: Incumbent member on the party list, or for another constituency) | 11,673 | 33.0 | ▼7.1 | 8,615 | 24.2 | ▼5.6 |
| Conservative | Nick Cook | 5,700 | 16.1 | ▲7.5 | 5,969 | 16.8 | ▲9.2 |
| Green | | | | | 4,098 | 11.5 | ▲4.3 |
| Liberal Democrats | Cospatric d'Inverno | 1,264 | 3.6 | ▼0.4 | 892 | 2.5 | ▼0.1 |
| UKIP | | | | | 684 | 1.9 | ▲1.3 |
| Women's Equality | | | | | 417 | 1.2 | New |
| RISE | | | | | 212 | 0.6 | New |
| Solidarity | | | | | 183 | 0.5 | ▲0.3 |
| Majority | | 5,087 | 14.3 | ▲7.0 | | | |
| Valid votes | | 35,397 | | | 35,627 | | |
| Invalid votes | | 277 | | | 71 | | |
| Turnout | | 35,624 | 56.7 | ▲1.3 | 35,698 | 56.8 | ▲1.4 |
| SNP hold | | Swing | | ▲3.5 | | | |
Notes

2011 Scottish Parliament election: Edinburgh Eastern
| Party | Candidate | Constituency | | | Region | | |
| Party | Candidate | Votes | % | ±% | Votes | % | ±% |
|---|---|---|---|---|---|---|---|
| SNP | Kenny MacAskill (Note: Incumbent member on the party list, or for another constituency) | 14,552 | 47.4 | N/A | 12,380 | 40.3 | N/A |
| Labour | Ewan Aitken | 12,319 | 40.1 | N/A | 9,171 | 29.8 | N/A |
| Conservative | Cameron Buchanan | 2,630 | 8.6 | N/A | 2,335 | 7.6 | N/A |
| Independent | Margo MacDonald | | | | 2,313 | 7.5 | N/A |
| Green | | | | | 2,219 | 7.2 | N/A |
| Liberal Democrats | Martin Veart | 1,227 | 4.0 | N/A | 795 | 2.6 | N/A |
| All-Scotland Pensioners Party | | | | | 445 | 1.4 | N/A |
| Socialist Labour | | | | | 225 | 0.7 | N/A |
| BNP | | | | | 224 | 0.7 | N/A |
| UKIP | | | | | 182 | 0.6 | N/A |
| Scottish Socialist | | | | | 144 | 0.5 | N/A |
| Scottish Christian | | | | | 109 | 0.4 | N/A |
| CPA | | | | | 66 | 0.2 | N/A |
| Liberal | | | | | 62 | 0.2 | N/A |
| Solidarity | | | | | 54 | 0.2 | N/A |
| Independent | Ken O'Neil | | | | 15 | 0.0 | N/A |
| Independent | Mev Brown | | | | 6 | 0.0 | N/A |
| Independent | David Hogg | | | | 5 | 0.0 | N/A |
| Majority | | 2,233 | 7.3 | N/A | | | |
| Valid votes | | 30,728 | | | 30,750 | | |
| Invalid votes | | 157 | | | 137 | | |
| Turnout | | 30,885 | 55.4 | N/A | 30,887 | 55.4 | N/A |
| SNP win (new seat) | | | | | | | |
