= Jeremy Balfour =

Scottish Conservative politician

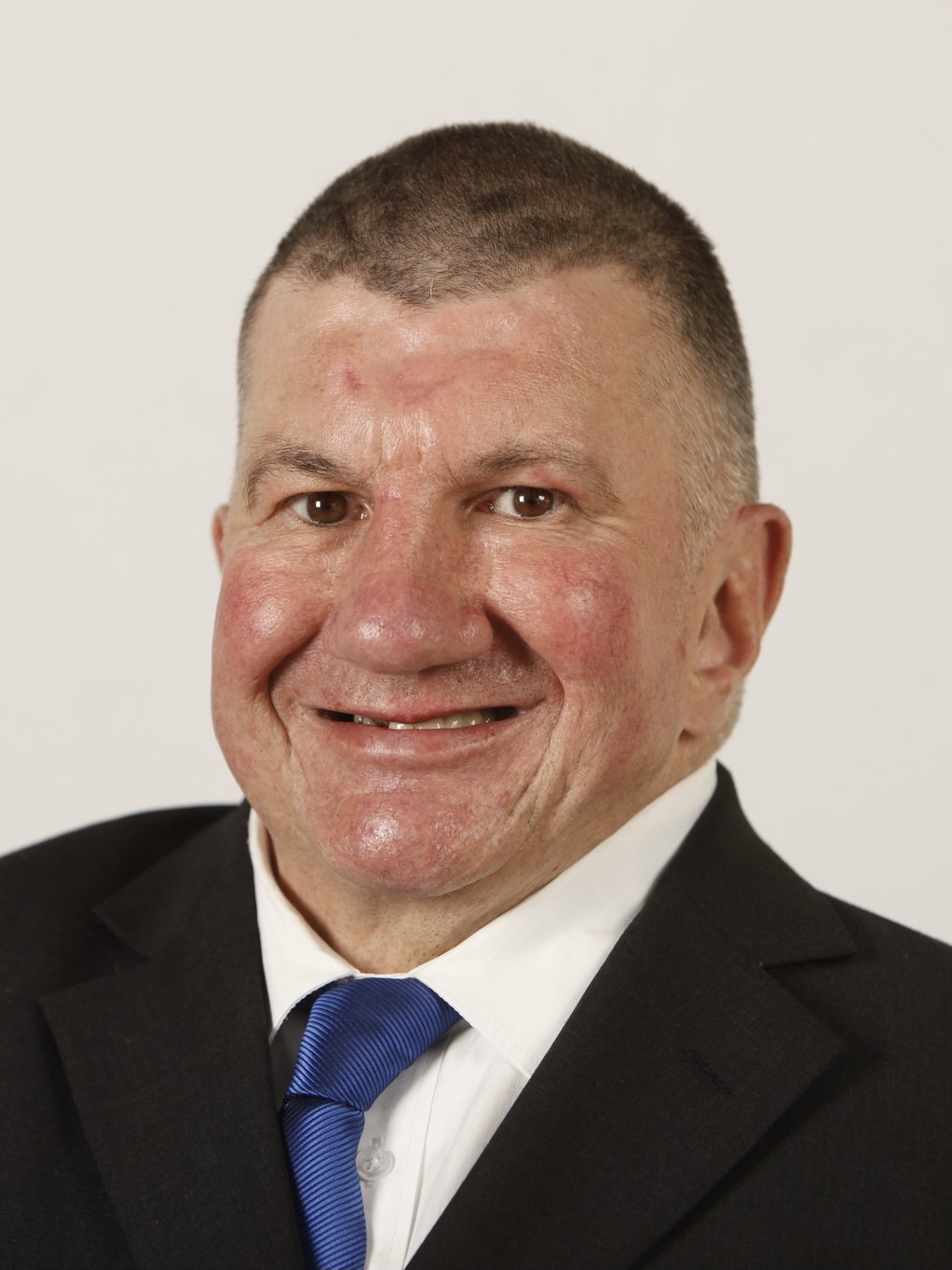
- Official portrait, 2016

Member of the Scottish Parliament for Lothian (1 of 7 Regional MSPs)
- In office 5 May 2016 – 9 April 2026

Personal details
- Born: 11 March 1967 (age 59) Edinburgh, Scotland
- Party: Independent (since 2025)
- Other political affiliations: Scottish Conservatives (until 2025)
- Education: University of Edinburgh; London Bible College

Jeremy Ross Balfour (born 11 March 1967) is a Scottish politician, baptist minister and solicitor who served as a Member of the Scottish Parliament (MSP) for the Lothian region from 2016 until 2026. Having been first elected as a Conservative, Balfour resigned from the party in August 2025, citing disagreements over Russell Findlay's leadership.

== Early life and career ==
Balfour was born in Edinburgh in 1967, the third of four children of Ian and Joyce Balfour.

Balfour attended the independent Edinburgh Academy and has spoken about the impact of his disability on his childhood. In 2005 Balfour praised his parents and teachers saying that they got the correct balance "between pushing me to do things and when I could not, finding other ways of getting me involved. For example I could not play rugby but I was made touch judge".

Balfour came from a family which included several lawyers and decided to pursue a legal career so then studied at the University of Edinburgh. He trained as a solicitor. After working as a solicitor, he studied at London Bible College to become a Baptist minister in 1995 and subsequently worked as an assistant minister at Morningside Baptist Church, where he met his wife. Around this time Balfour also worked as a lobbyist for the Evangelical Alliance.

== Political career ==
=== Electoral Politics ===
Balfour previously stood in Edinburgh East and Musselburgh in the 1999 Scottish Parliament election and Central Fife in the 2001 UK General Election.

Balfour was elected to City of Edinburgh Council, representing the Corstorphine/Murrayfield ward from 2007 and did not stand for re-election in 2017 after being elected to Holyrood.

=== Member of the Scottish Parliament ===
In the 2016 Scottish Parliament election, Balfour stood as the Conservative candidate for Midlothian North and Musselburgh, where he came third with 6,267 votes (18.1%). He was instead elected from the Lothian regional list.

Shortly after being elected, Balfour became Scottish Conservative spokesperson for childcare and early years and joined the Equal Opportunities Committee of the Scottish Parliament.

In 2018, Balfour came under pressure to resign as the Scottish Conservative's welfare spokesperson for suggesting that terminally-ill people who don't die within three years should be re-assessed for benefits. He refused to apologise for the remarks, but was forced to withdraw the amendment to the Social Security (Scotland) Bill.

Balfour served as the Scottish Conservatives' Deputy Social Security, Housing and Equalities Spokesperson.

Balfour was awarded 'Speech of the Year' by Holyrood Magazine in June 2019 for a speech on the 70th anniversary of the NHS.

November 2020 was the 25th anniversary of the Disability Discrimination Act coming into law. Balfour stated his opinion that more needs to be done to help disabled people into work in society.

Balfour is the convenor of the Cross-Party Group (CPG) in the Scottish Parliament on Disability, the CPG on Funerals and Bereavement, and the CPG on Older People, Age and Ageing, and Co-convenes the CPG on Volunteering. Balfour is also the member of many other cross-party groups entering on sport, disability, education and on matters relating to equality.

On 12 January 2022, Balfour called for Boris Johnson to resign as Conservative party leader and Prime Minister over the Westminster lockdown parties controversy along with a majority of Scottish Conservative MSPs.

==== Resignation from the Scottish Conservatives and subsequent activity ====
On 22 August 2025, Balfour announced his resignation from the Scottish Conservatives. In a statement, he said: "I no longer feel that the party has a positive platform to offer the people of Scotland. I have found that there is little interest from the leadership in genuine policy innovation, particularly across the social justice and social security portfolio. Increasingly, decisions seem to be made by advisors who lack experience, while senior MSP colleagues are ignored.” Additionally, Balfour said that the party had “fallen into the trap of reactionary politics where a positive, proactive agenda for real change has been rejected in favour of allowing policies to be dictated by what other parties are saying and chasing cheap headlines”. Prior to resigning, Balfour had been selected as the Conservative candidate in May to contest the new Edinburgh North Western constituency at the 2026 Scottish Parliament election. He ruled out joining Reform UK, and said at the time he was yet to consider standing in the 2026 election.

In September 2025, Balfour confirmed that he would seek re-election as an independent on the redrawn Edinburgh and Lothians East regional list. Balfour received 2,261 votes and was not elected.

Balfour supported the Scottish Government's 2026 budget after negotiating additional funding for Changing Places Toilets and the King's Theatre in Edinburgh.

=== Political views ===
In his role for the Evangelical Alliance, Balfour called in 2000 for "an alternative [in schools] where children could play and explore the imagination" in instances where Christian parents were concerned of their children having to celebrate Halloween. Balfour said of this role when talking about its stance on gay marriage in 2005, saying "My role with the Evangelical Alliance is to put across the Christian perspective. It does not mean that I feel people with different lifestyles should be discriminated against."

The Evangelical Alliance is openly opposed to "all attitudes and actions which victimise or diminish" people with same-sex attraction, but believes that marriage between one man and one woman "is the only form of partnership approved by God for sexual relations" and so does not accept "sexually active same-sex partnerships as a legitimate form of Christian relationship."

From 2004 to 2014, Balfour was director of the Scottish Council on Human Bioethics, a right-wing think tank. In keeping with his aforementioned views on discrimination, Balfour distanced himself from the think-tank after it emerged it had produced a report questioning the morality of victims of rape who take the morning-after pill.

In the aforementioned interview in 2005, Balfour said "Marriage is for a man and a woman. That would be the Bible's perspective. But we have to recognise there are different views in society." Balfour has been consistent in his view on this and has stated his acceptance of the legality of same-sex marriage within Scotland in the legal sense.

Balfour has expressed concern and raised parliamentary questions regarding abortion. Specifically, Balfour is concerned about abortions in cases of disabilities. He expressed fears in 2018 around whether or not women who were potentially going to give birth to disabled children were getting access to all the information and support that they need to make informed decisions. Balfour expressed these fears in relation to limb disabilities like his own and also to Down syndrome. In the interview, Balfour said "As a society we have to say ultimately it is the mother's choice, but the mother needs to be given as much information as possible to help with an understanding that yes, a disabled child will bring with it other issues, but it will also perhaps give you extra opportunities that you would not have expected."

Reflecting on his own birth, he said: "It was a time where lots of individuals were born with lots of different disabilities for different reasons, and there was a special centre built here in Edinburgh, the Princess Margaret Rose orthopaedic hospital. There were lots of us around who either had upper or lower limb operations and fifty years on from that I happened to be asking staff how many people born more recently with a similar disability do they treat? The response came that in regard to children, there is now a very small number – under ten – that they have had in the last number of years coming in. The reason for that is two-fold; one is a positive reason where I think mums are living healthier lifestyles and I think that has definitely affected the number of children born with a disability.The second reason is that children who come up on a scan with a disability, too often I think, mothers think 'we need to abort this child'. Now that clearly is a mother's choice and whether or not they make that choice is not for me to comment on. But for me, I wonder whether mums are being given the whole picture; for example, yes having a child with a disability such as an upper limb missing doesn't mean they can't still go on to do lots of things. They can still go through education and lead a very fulfilling life."

== Personal life ==
Balfour has a physical disability which left him with no left arm and a right arm that ends at the elbow from which two elongated fingers protrude. In relation to his disability, Balfour has said that thalidomide is not the cause of his disability and it is uncertain what in fact is.

In 2019, Balfour and a dog that his family looks after, Sadie, won the Holyrood Dog of the Year competition having taken part in an agility course.

Balfour is married with two daughters.
