= Alliance to Liberate Scotland =

- Abbreviation: AtLS
- Leader: Hazel Lyon
- Founded: 2025
- Registered: 3 February 2026
- Headquarters: 48 West George Street; Glasgow, Scotland; G2 1PB
- Ideology: Scottish independence
- Slogan: Independence. Nothing More. Nothing Less
- Scottish Parliament: 0 / 129
- Scottish local government: 0 / 1,227

Website
- liberatescot.scot

Alliance to Liberate Scotland (AtLS) is a minor pro-Scottish independence political party that was registered in 2026. The group campaigns for Scottish independence and has sought to coordinate candidates from several smaller pro-independence parties and activists ahead of the 2026 Scottish Parliament election.

The alliance is associated with the broader Liberate Scotland coalition, which brings together groups including the Independence for Scotland Party, Sovereignty and Independents for Independence in an effort to promote independence through electoral participation and grassroots campaigning. The ISP later withdrew from the alliance on 15 March 2026.

The organisation describes itself as a single-issue movement focused on achieving Scottish independence and argues that representatives elected under its banner should prioritise constitutional change above other policy areas.

== History ==
=== Formation ===
The Alliance to Liberate Scotland emerged in 2025 as part of a broader initiative to unite smaller pro-independence organisations under a common electoral platform. The initiative was linked to the Liberate Scotland campaign, which sought to coordinate activists and smaller political parties in the independence movement.

Supporters of the initiative argued that cooperation between smaller independence groups could help increase representation for pro-independence candidates and provide an alternative political platform to the larger independence parties already represented in the Scottish Parliament.

In February 2026, the Alliance to Liberate Scotland was registered as a political party with the Electoral Commission.

The alliance announced plans to stand candidates in the 2026 Scottish Parliament election, working alongside other pro-independence organisations including the Independence for Scotland Party and Sovereignty.

On 12 March 2026, several prominent pro-independence figures announced their defections from the Alba Party after it was announced that the party would deregister following a financial and leadership crisis.

Some of the candidates who intended to stand as Alba candidates announced they would stand for ATLS, including former Solidarity leader Tommy Sheridan and his wife Gail Sheridan, both of whom defected from Alba, and former British diplomat Craig Murray, who left Your Party to stand as the ATLS candidate in Edinburgh Central against SNP incumbent Angus Robertson.

The developments quickly triggered internal tensions within the new party. Allan Petrie, a founding member of ATLS and its press officer who had been expected to stand in Dundee City East, resigned in protest at Murray’s selection, criticising what he described as political opportunism and citing disagreements over Murray’s stance on gender recognition. Petrie stated the party had become “the same old party politics we set out to challenge”. Murray rejected the criticism, arguing that standing for ATLS was unlikely to advance a political career but would provide a platform to argue for Scottish independence, and said debates on issues such as gender recognition should take place after independence had been achieved.

On 15 March 2026, further tensions emerged when the Independence for Scotland Party announced it would withdraw from the Alliance to Liberate Scotland and contest elections under its own name. In a statement, the party said the alliance had originally been formed on the basis of unity, mutual respect and democratic decision-making among participating groups, but claimed that after ATLS formally registered as a political party earlier in 2026, decisions on candidate selection and electoral strategy were increasingly being taken without consultation with other stakeholders. The party’s executive stated that the breakdown in trust and concerns about internal democracy had led its candidates to withdraw unanimously from the alliance and stand independently.

In response, the Alliance to Liberate Scotland rejected these assertions. ATLS clarified that it had not been involved in the vetting or selection of candidates for either the ISP or the Sovereignty party, as those processes remained the exclusive prerogative of each respective party. ATLS further stated that at no time were any decisions on electoral strategy taken without consultation with ISP and other relevant stakeholders.

=== 2026 Scottish Parliament election ===
Alliance to Liberate Scotland contested the 2026 Scottish Parliament election, standing candidates on both the constituency and regional ballots across multiple parts of Scotland. The party received 4,768 constituency votes, representing 0.21% of the national constituency vote, alongside 18,396 regional votes, equating to 0.84% of the regional vote. No Alliance to Liberate Scotland candidates were elected to the Scottish Parliament.

During the campaign, the party attracted some media attention following claims by Sheridan that Alliance to Liberate Scotland was polling at around 8% support. The figure originated from a poll commissioned by the party and conducted by Find Out Now, though the survey did not ask respondents to choose between all parties in a standard voting intention format. Instead, participants were asked whether they would consider voting for the party, leading to criticism and accusations that the figures overstated the party’s actual electoral support.

The party’s strongest constituency result came in Na h-Eileanan an Iar, where candidate Kenny MacKenzie received 159 votes (1.3%). The result drew attention after SNP candidate Alasdair Allan lost the seat to Scottish Labour’s Donald MacKinnon by 154 votes. Some commentators suggested Alliance to Liberate Scotland had contributed to splitting the pro-independence vote in the constituency, although the extent of its impact was disputed.

== Policies ==
The Alliance to Liberate Scotland presents itself as a single-issue independence movement, focusing primarily on Scottish independence rather than a comprehensive domestic policy programme. However, it also pledges to reduce wealth inequality and poverty, and postulates a major reform to the Scottish parliamentary system that would entail an "end to party control and the rise of independent representatives who answer only to their constituents and the people of Scotland."

Parts of the party are on the far-right. One of the founding members of the AtLS, Eva Comrie, stated that this is made possible as the group has ‘one single aim, one single purpose, and that is independence, nothing less’. The organisation has stated that it would not operate a traditional party whip system and that elected representatives would vote according to their conscience on most policy issues, except on matters related to achieving independence.

== Elections contested ==
=== Scottish Parliament ===
Election	Leader	Constituency			Regional			Total seats	±	Rank	Government
Election	Leader	Votes	%	Seats	Votes	%	Seats	Total seats	±	Rank	Government
2026	Hazel Lyon	4,768	0.2	0 / 73	19,318	0.8	0 / 56	0 / 129		7th	Not elected

The Alliance to Liberate Scotland announced its intention to contest the 2026 Scottish Parliament election as part of a wider coalition of pro-independence candidates associated with Liberate Scotland.
