= Results of the 2026 Scottish Parliament election =

This is a list of the results of the 2026 Scottish Parliament election.

== Results by constituency and region ==
=== Constituencies ===
Seat	SNP	Labour	Conservative	Greens	Lib Dem	Reform UK	Other
Aberdeen Central	Jack Middleton; 11,974	Jenny Laing; 5,002	Stewart Whyte; 3,688		Yi-pei Chou Turvey; 2,563	James Wyllie; 3,936	
Aberdeen Deeside and North Kincardine	Stephen Flynn; 11,788	Matthew Lee; 2,805	Liam Kerr; 10,544		Mel Sullivan; 2,880	Duncan Massey; 6,113	Iris Alexandra Leask (Ind, 431)
Aberdeen Donside	Jackie Dunbar; 11,760	Lynn Thomson; 3,907	Hannah Powell; 4,496		Michael Turvey; 2,823	Claudia Leith; 7,029	Stephen Bowie (AtLS/Sovereignty, 481)
Aberdeenshire East	Gillian Martin; 11,624	Janine Langler; 1,487	Douglas Lumsden; 10,681		David Evans; 3,999	John Crawley; 7,008	
Aberdeenshire West	Fatima Joji; 10,113	Kate Blake; 1,569	Alexander Burnett; 15,897		Jeff Goodhall; 3,995	Jo Hart; 5,467	
Airdrie	Neil Gray; 10,711	Suzanne Macleod; 6,201	Euan Blockley; 1,145		Ed Thornley; 660	Graham Simpson; 5,821	Brendan O’Donnell (Ind, 505); John Jo Leckie (ASP, 441)
Almond Valley	Angela Constance; 16,944	Jordan Stokoe; 8,035	Damian Doran-Timson; 2,501		Caron Lindsay; 2,307	Malcolm Jones; 6,831	
Angus North and Mearns	Dawn Black; 11,308	Simon Watson; 1,676	Tracey Smith; 8,058		Martyn Knights; 2,647	Laurie Carnie; 4,844	David Allen Neil (Ind, 468)
Angus South	Lloyd Melville; 13,289	Heather Doran; 3,344	Angus MacMillan Douglas; 6,681		Isobel Knights; 2,488	Bill Reid; 5,583	
Argyll and Bute	Jenni Minto; 11,019	Callum George; 1,740	Peter Wallace; 1,703		Alan Reid; 8,468	Amanda Hampsey; 3,678	Tommy Macpherson (Ind, 769); Mick Rice (Ind, 179)
Ayr	Siobhian Brown; 12,848	Brian McGinley; 6,394	Sharon Dowey; 8,448		Desmond Buchanan; 1,427	Andrew Russell; 5,355	Denise Sommerville (Ind, 742); Muhammad Tufail (Scottish Common, 78)
Banffshire and Buchan Coast	Karen Adam 10,374	Brooke Ritchie; 1,049	James Adams; 6,348		Leslie Tarr; 1,162	Conrad Ritchie; 10,010	N. D. R. McLennan (Ind, 555)
Bathgate	Pauline Stafford; 13,594	Jenny Young; 8,007	Peter Heggie; 2,091		Stephen Harte; 1,937	David McLennan; 7,511	Gus Ferguson (BUP, 227)
Caithness, Sutherland and Ross	Maree Todd; 9,574	Eva Kestner; 894	Donald MacKenzie; 1,117		David Green; 14,666	Steven Welsh; 3,900	Andrew MacDonald (AtLS/Sovereignty, 264); Matt Sheppard (Advance UK, 112)
Carrick, Cumnock and Doon Valley	Katie Hagmann; 9,610	Carol Mochan; 6,671	Tracey Clark; 3,680		Karen Utting; 1,187	Andrew Scott; 6,988	Sean Davis (Ind, 412); Alison Hewett (Ind, 413)
Clackmannanshire and Dunblane	Keith Brown; 12,222	Suzanne Grahame; 7,958	Alexander Stewart; 3,592		Sally Pattle; 1,841	Mike Collier; 5,181	Eva Comrie (AtLS, 1,228); Luca Scacchi (Ind, 345)
Clydebank and Milngavie	Marie McNair; 12,126	Callum McNally; 7,929	Alix Mathieson; 1,820		Ben Langmead; 4,419	Andy White; 4,510	Claire Gallagher (Scottish Common, 647)
Clydesdale	Màiri McAllan; 13,006	Lynsey Hamilton; 8,618	Julie Pirone; 4,344		Richard Brodie; 1,957	Daniel Clarke; 7,898	
Coatbridge and Chryston	Fulton MacGregor; 14,458	Kieron Higgins; 7,682	Andy Bruce; 1,109		Daniel Mancini; 1,048	Mandy Lindsay; 5,145	
Cowdenbeath	David Barratt; 11,994	Fiona Sword; 6,307	Darren Watt; 2,201		James Calder; 1,547	Mark Davies; 4,708	Laurie Moffat (AtLS/Sovereignty, 304)
Cumbernauld and Kilsyth	Jamie Hepburn; 13,787	James McPhilemy; 6,472	Keith Allan; 1,129		William Brian Howieson; 949	Steve Grant; 4,580	Alan McManus (AtLS/Sovereignty, 226)
Cunninghame North	Kenneth Gibson; 11,814	Matthew McGowan; 6,022	Ronnie Stalker; 4,904		Christine Murdoch; 1,592	Mike Mann; 5,404	Ian Gibson (ADF, 411)
Cunninghame South	Patricia Gibson; 11,375	Katy Clark; 7,208	Maurice Corry; 2,222		Emma Farthing-Sykes; 1,442	Matthew McLean; 7,049	
Dumbarton	Sophie Traynor; 10,961	Jackie Baillie; 12,747	Gary Mulvaney; 1,368		Elaine Ford; 1,196	David Smith; 5,040	Andrew Muir (Ind, 355); Lynda Hannah McEwan (TUSC, 356)
Dumfriesshire	Stephen Thompson; 10,262	Linda Dorward; 3,364	Craig Hoy; 11,370		Iain McDonald; 1,660	David Kirkwood; 5,783	Paul Adkins (Common, 200)
Dundee City East	Stephen Gethins; 12,969	Cheryl-Ann Cruickshank; 4,792	Jack Cruickshanks; 1,999		Tanvir Ahmad; 2,086	Mark Simpson; 4,135	Peter Ashby (WPB, 209); Donald McLeod (TUSC, 361)
Dundee City West	Heather Anderson; 12,722	Michael Marra; 6,365	Abigail Brooks; 881		Daniel Coleman; 1,980	Arthur Keith; 3,315 (Note: Stuart Niven was announced as Reform candidate on 19 March 2026, and suspended from Reform on 20 March.)	Jim McFarlane (TUSC, 649)
Dunfermline	Shirley-Anne Somerville; 14,206	Joe Long; 8,769	Thomas Heald; 2,209		Lauren Buchanan-Quigley; 3,849	Otto Inglis; 5,093	
East Kilbride	Collette Stevenson; 14,339	Joe Fagan; 9,395	Brian Whittle; 2,251		Leigh Butler; 1,424	Tim Kelly; 5,683	Kristofer Keane (Ind, 716)
East Lothian Coast and Lammermuirs	Paul McLennan; 11,677	Martin Whitfield; 11,259	Miles Briggs; 4,719		Tim McKay; 2,802	Nigel Douglas; 4,611	Morgwn Carter Davies (Ind, 597)
Eastwood	Kirsten Oswald; 12,722	Kayleigh Quinn; 8,368	Jackson Carlaw; 11,990		Euan Davidson; 1,748	John Mooney; 3,453	
Edinburgh Central	Angus Robertson; 7,702	James Dalgleish; 8,098	Jo Mowat; 2,262	Lorna Slater; 12,680	Charles Dundas; 2,168	Gary Neill; 1,876	Tam Laird (Libertarian, 56); Craig John Murray (AtLS, 150); Bonnie Prince Bob (Ind, 176); Chris Creighton (Ind, 32); Robert Neil Pownall (Ind, 41)
Edinburgh Eastern, Musselburgh and Tranent	Kate Campbell; 14,083	Katherine Sangster; 9,097	Tim Jones; 1,819		Alan Grant; 2,057	Angela Ross; 4,120	Joe Smith (AtLS, 305)
Edinburgh North Eastern and Leith	Ben Macpherson 13,630	Oliver Thomas; 7,894	Haris Young; 1,297	Kate Nevens; 10,559	Liss Owen; 1,895	David Lees; 2,746	
Edinburgh North Western	Lyn Jardine; 9,943	Irshad Ahmed; 1,879	Rachel Cairns; 1,749		Alex Cole-Hamilton; 22,959	Davie Thomson; 3,342	David Henry (WPB, 268)
Edinburgh Northern	Euan Hyslop; 10,479	Eleanor Ryan-Saha; 3,744	Christopher Cowdy; 1,900	Kayleigh Kinross-O'Neill; 5,289	Sanne Dijkstra-Downie; 12,972	Andrew McLaughlin; 2,867	Abu Meron (SWP, 258)
Edinburgh South Western	Simita Kumar; 11,727	Catriona Munro; 8,438	Sue Webber; 4,636		Andy Williamson; 3,672	Cameron Rose; 3,936	
Edinburgh Southern	Deidre Brock; 12,000	Daniel Johnson; 16,963	Marie-Clair Munro; 3,421		Jane Alliston Pickard; 3,334	Charles Turner; 3,317	Mar Wilkinson (EELP, 524)
Ettrick, Roxburgh and Berwickshire	John Redpath; 8,206	Kaymarie Hughes; 1,577	Rachael Hamilton; 13,483		Ray Georgeson; 2,358	Jamie Langan; 3,569	Terry Howson (AtLS, 165); James Anderson (Ind, 740)
Falkirk East and Linlithgow	Martyn Day; 14,465	Siobhan Paterson; 9,030	Lewis Stein; 2,861		Paul McGarry; 2,501	Amanda Bland; 7,906	Ian Wallace El-Paget (Ind, 759)
Falkirk West	Gary Bouse 14,896	Paul Godzik; 7,859	Neil Benny; 2,297		Lucy Smith; 2,037	Richard Fairley; 8,160	Stuart James McArthur (Ind, 865)
Fife North East	John Beare; 7,876	Elizabeth Carr-Ellis; 818	Edward Sheasby; 936		Willie Rennie; 21,350	William Docherty; 2,524	
Galloway and West Dumfries	Emma Harper; 9,903	Jack McConnel; 2,544	Finlay Carson; 11,502		Tracey Warman; 1,380	Senga Beresford; 4,674	
Glasgow Anniesland	Colm Merrick; 13,281	Eunis Jassemi; 9,162	Sandesh Gulhane; 1,404		James Speirs; 1,688	Sean O'Hagan; 4,839	
Glasgow Baillieston and Shettleston	David Linden; 12,075	Pauline McNeill; 5,885	John Murray; 1,006		Amy Carman; 1,082	Thomas Kerr; 6,972	
Glasgow Cathcart and Pollok	Zen Ghani; 14,270	Anas Sarwar; 9,107	Kyle Park; 1,325		Peter McLaughlin; 1,407	Kim Schmulian; 5,320	Yvonne Ridley (WPGB, 586); Adnan Zafar Rafiq (Scottish Common, 163)
Glasgow Central	Alison Thewliss; 15,085	Vonnie Sandlan; 5,094	Naveed Asghar; 835		Paul Kennedy; 1,262	Paul Bennie; 3,988	
Glasgow Easterhouse and Springburn	Ivan McKee; 11,926	Paul Sweeney; 6,772	Josephine Macleod; 706		Nicholas Moohan; 788	Audrey Dempsey; 5,309	Kenneth Nwosu (Scottish Common, 301)
Glasgow Kelvin and Maryhill	Bob Doris; 11,174	James Adams; 7,531	Danny Bowman; 1,309	Iris Duane; 9,003	Daniel Khan-O'Malley; 1,374	Aimee Alexander; 3,592	Thomas Adkins (Scottish Common, 130)
Glasgow Southside	Kaukab Stewart; 10,947	Rashid Hussain; 7,300	Ross Hutton; 1,383	Holly Bruce; 14,048	Rachel Park; 1,143	Gordon Millar; 3,019	Kamran Butt (Scottish Common, 512); Abdullah Aroo Waqqar (Ind, 147)
Hamilton, Larkhall and Stonehouse	Alex Kerr; 11,825	Davy Russell; 9,120	Alexandra Herdman; 1,617		Michael Weatherhead; 1,156	John McNamee; 7,193	David Ballantine (ADF, 348)
Inverclyde	Stuart McMillan; 14,193	Francesca Brennan; 8,876	Ted Runciman; 1,351		Jamie Greene; 1,954	Malcolm Offord; 5,649	
Inverness and Nairn	Emma Roddick; 11,162	Shaun Fraser; 1,723	Ruraidh Stewart; 1,372		Neil Alexander; 10,735	Fred Campbell; 3,791	Fergus Ewing (Ind, 7,840); Steve Skerrett (Advance UK, 110)
Kilmarnock and Irvine Valley	Alan Brown; 11,919	Ewan McPhee; 7,458	James Adams; 2,780		Michael Gregori; 1,169	Anne Millar; 5,441	Garry McClay (AtLS, 407)
Kirkcaldy	David Torrance; 12,230	Claire Baker; 7,483	Heather Greig; 1,445		Fraser Graham; 1,607	Julie MacDougall; 5,484	
Mid Fife and Glenrothes	Jenny Gilruth; 12,461	Afifa Khanam; 3,970	Niamh Heald; 1,414		Ed Scotcher; 3,047	Sacha Haworth; 4,827	
Midlothian North	Colin Beattie; 11,250	Caitlin Stott; 8,754	Phil Doggart; 2,032		Jenny Butler; 2,387	Pal Chidambaram; 4,506	
Midlothian South, Tweeddale and Lauderdale	Calum Kerr; 14,091	Daniel Coleman; 4,614	Keith Cockburn; 6,930		Duncan Dunlop; 4,649	Carolyn Grant; 4,199	
Moray	Laura Mitchell; 12,646	David Blair; 2,340	Tim Eagle; 9,963		Morven-May MacCallum; 2,064	Max Bannerman; 5,540	Allan Duffy (AtLS, 210)
Motherwell and Wishaw	Clare Adamson; 11,962	Ayeshah Khan; 6,447	Bob Burgess; 1,638		Jenni Lang; 979	Duncan Macmillan; 5,692	Dominic James Alderson (Ind, 328); Greig Duncan McArthur (AtLS, 298)
Na h-Eileanan an Iar	Alasdair Allan; 4,511	Donald MacKinnon; 4,665	George MacPherson; 594		Jamie Dobson; 812	Malcolm McTaggart; 1,625	Kenneth McKenzie (AtLS/Sovereignty, 159); Duncan MacPherson (Ind, 139)
Orkney Islands	Robert Leslie; 1,661	Mike Macleod; 199	Jamie Halcro Johnston; 358		Liam McArthur; 7,221	John Coupland; 844	
Paisley	George Adam; 13,164	Neil Bibby; 10,136	Satbir Gill; 940		James Kenyon; 1,073	Alec Leishman; 4,620	Mark Turnbull (Freedom Alliance, 212); Sinead Daly (TUSC, 297); William Wallace (Ind, 458)
Perthshire North	John Swinney; 16,414	Angela Bailey; 2,240	Murdo Fraser; 10,171		Claire McLaren; 2,741	Kenneth Morton; 4,620	
Perthshire South and Kinross-shire	Jim Fairlie; 14,707	Luke Thomson; 2,599	Roz McCall; 9,646		Amanda Clark; 4,329	Helen McDade; 5,128	
Renfrewshire North and Cardonald	Michelle Campbell; 14,300	Mike McKirdy; 9,424	Jack Hall; 1,929		Grant Toghill; 1,642	Moira Ramage; 7,083	Jim Halfpenny (TUSC)
Renfrewshire West and Levern Valley	Tom Arthur; 13,819	Paul O'Kane; 10,548	Farooq Choudhry; 2,016		Ross Stalker; 1,610	Jamie McGuire; 5,844	Ken Thomson (ADF, 374)
Rutherglen and Cambuslang	Clare Haughey; 14,969	Monica Lennon; 9,125	Annie Wells; 1,321		Patrick Logue; 1,833	Allan Lyons; 6,168	Chris Sermanni (TUSC, 467)
Shetland Islands	Hannah Mary Goodlad; 5,453	John Erskine; 169	Douglas Barnett; 137	Alex Armitage; 949	Emma Macdonald; 3,936	Vic Currie; 725	Brian Nugent (AtLS/Sovereignty, 65); Peter Tait (Ind, 50)
Skye, Lochaber and Badenoch	Eilidh Munro; 14,273	Isla McCay; 1,751	Helen Crawford; 2,731		Andrew Baxter; 15,223	Jon Whitton; 4,669	Laùra Hänsler (AtLS, 506)
Stirling	Alyn Smith; 13,608	Kainde Manji; 5,124	Stephen Kerr; 6,166		Jill Reilly; 2,324	Rachael Wright; 4,908	Matthew Riley (Ind)
Strathkelvin and Bearsden	Denis Johnston; 13,125	Colette McDiarmid; 4,678	Pam Gosal; 2,122		Adam Harley; 15,697	Faten Hameed; 4,154	
Uddingston and Bellshill	Steven Bonnar; 11,966	Mark Griffin; 8,832	Meghan Gallacher; 1,750		Ben Munnoch; 1,094	George Hobbins; 5,646	

=== Regions ===
==== Votes ====
Seat	SNP	Labour	Conservative	Greens	Lib Dems	Reform UK	Other	Total
Central Scotland and Lothians West	86,809	57,103	19,450	34,415	12,830	58,334	13,814	282,755
Edinburgh and Lothians East	69,655	58,696	29,223	67,877	42,937	33,341	17,855	319,594
Glasgow	68,669	47,795	10,621	58,881	9,826	38,341	15,330	249,463
Highlands and Islands	54,011	14,632	20,334	21,935	47,437	28,276	14,512	201,137
Mid Scotland and Fife	81,018	41,056	37,155	36,286	34,363	45,632	10,508	286,018
North East Scotland	88,084	29,144	62,174	30,028	25,980	59,823	12,616	307,849
South Scotland	86,446	52,314	60,726	31,170	17,999	61,346	12,561	322,562
West Scotland	91,257	68,045	31,867	41,372	24,852	58,332	18,418	334,143

==== Vote percentages ====
Seat	SNP	Lab.	Con.	Grn.	Lib.	Ref.	Oth.	Total
Central Scotland and Lothians West	30.7	20.2	6.9	12.2	4.5	20.6	4.9	282,755
Edinburgh and Lothians East	21.8	18.4	9.1	21.2	13.4	10.4	5.6	319,594
Glasgow	27.5	19.2	4.3	23.6	3.9	15.4	6.1	249,463
Highlands and Islands	26.9	7.3	10.1	10.9	23.6	14.1	7.2	201,137
Mid Scotland and Fife	28.3	14.4	13.0	12.7	12.0	16.0	3.7	286,018
North East Scotland	28.6	9.5	20.2	9.8	8.4	19.4	4.1	307,849
South Scotland	26.0	16.2	18.8	9.7	5.6	19.0	3.9	322,562
West Scotland	27.3	20.4	9.5	12.4	7.4	17.5	5.5	334,143

==== Members ====
= elected in constituency vote

Seat	No.	SNP	Labour	Conservative	Greens	Lib Dems	Reform UK	Liberate Scotland	Scottish Family	SSP	Other
Central Scotland and Lothians West											
Central Scotland and Lothians West	1	Pauline Stafford	Mark Griffin	Meghan Gallacher	Gillian Mackay	Paul McGarry	Graham Simpson	Greig McArthur	David Richardson	Collette Bradley	Abolish (John Jo Leckie); Advance UK (Mark Tunnicliff); ISP (Julie McAnulty); IGV (James Stewart); Libertarian (Lukasz Furmaniak); UKIP (Neil Wilson, Stephen Hollis, Margaret Garbutt); WPB (Abdul Dean)
Central Scotland and Lothians West	2	Neil Gray	Jenny Young	Lewis Stein	Claire Williams	Lucy Smith	Mandy Lindsay	Alan McManus	Leo Lanahan	Lewis Clark	Abolish (John Jo Leckie); Advance UK (Mark Tunnicliff); ISP (Julie McAnulty); IGV (James Stewart); Libertarian (Lukasz Furmaniak); UKIP (Neil Wilson, Stephen Hollis, Margaret Garbutt); WPB (Abdul Dean)
Central Scotland and Lothians West	3	Toni Giugliano	Keiron Higgins	Neil Benny	Cameron Glasgow	Caron Lindsay	Amanda Bland	David Baird	Norma McLachlan Diffin	Conor Gilbey	Abolish (John Jo Leckie); Advance UK (Mark Tunnicliff); ISP (Julie McAnulty); IGV (James Stewart); Libertarian (Lukasz Furmaniak); UKIP (Neil Wilson, Stephen Hollis, Margaret Garbutt); WPB (Abdul Dean)
Central Scotland and Lothians West	4	Clare Adamson	Siobhan Paterson	Keith Allan	Anne McCrossan	Stephen Harte	Richard Fairley	Graham Fraser	Ailish Lanahan		Abolish (John Jo Leckie); Advance UK (Mark Tunnicliff); ISP (Julie McAnulty); IGV (James Stewart); Libertarian (Lukasz Furmaniak); UKIP (Neil Wilson, Stephen Hollis, Margaret Garbutt); WPB (Abdul Dean)
Central Scotland and Lothians West	5	Callum Cox	James McPhilemy	Andrew Bruce		Brian Howieson	David McLennan	Steve Arnott			Abolish (John Jo Leckie); Advance UK (Mark Tunnicliff); ISP (Julie McAnulty); IGV (James Stewart); Libertarian (Lukasz Furmaniak); UKIP (Neil Wilson, Stephen Hollis, Margaret Garbutt); WPB (Abdul Dean)
Central Scotland and Lothians West	6	Steven Bonnar	Suzanne Macleod	Peter Heggie		Daniel Mancini	Duncan MacMillan				Abolish (John Jo Leckie); Advance UK (Mark Tunnicliff); ISP (Julie McAnulty); IGV (James Stewart); Libertarian (Lukasz Furmaniak); UKIP (Neil Wilson, Stephen Hollis, Margaret Garbutt); WPB (Abdul Dean)
Central Scotland and Lothians West	7	Stacey Devine	Ayeshah Khan	Damian Doran-Timson		Jenni Lang	Steven Grant				Abolish (John Jo Leckie); Advance UK (Mark Tunnicliff); ISP (Julie McAnulty); IGV (James Stewart); Libertarian (Lukasz Furmaniak); UKIP (Neil Wilson, Stephen Hollis, Margaret Garbutt); WPB (Abdul Dean)
Central Scotland and Lothians West	8		Jordan Stockoe	Bob Burgess			Malcolm Jones				Abolish (John Jo Leckie); Advance UK (Mark Tunnicliff); ISP (Julie McAnulty); IGV (James Stewart); Libertarian (Lukasz Furmaniak); UKIP (Neil Wilson, Stephen Hollis, Margaret Garbutt); WPB (Abdul Dean)
Central Scotland and Lothians West	9			Euan Blockley			George Hobbins				Abolish (John Jo Leckie); Advance UK (Mark Tunnicliff); ISP (Julie McAnulty); IGV (James Stewart); Libertarian (Lukasz Furmaniak); UKIP (Neil Wilson, Stephen Hollis, Margaret Garbutt); WPB (Abdul Dean)
Edinburgh and Lothians East											
Edinburgh and Lothians East	1	Tommy Sheppard	Irshad Ahmed	Miles Briggs	Lorna Slater	Sanne Dijkstra-Downie	Angela Ross	Craig Murray	Philip Holden	Colin Fox	Advance UK (Sean Moffat); AWP (Mark Scott, Lee Christopher Williscroft-Ferris, Vivienne Margret Moir, Jane Catherine Smith); Communist (Chris Cullen); EELP (Marc Richard Wilkinson, David Sisson); Equality (David Renton, Laura MacKintosh, Caitlin Dykes-Johnstone); ISP (John Hannah); IGV (Megan Burns); Libertarian (Tam Laird, Gary Finlayson Smith); WPB (David Henry, Abu Meron); Jeremy Balfour (Independent); Bonnie Prince Bob (Independent); Morgwn Carter Davies (Independent); Ash Regan (Independent)
Edinburgh and Lothians East	2	Deidre Brock	Katherine Sangster	Sue Webber	Kate Nevens	Jane Pickard	Pal Chidambaram	Joe Smith	Neil Deepnarain	Natalie Reid	
Edinburgh and Lothians East	3	Simita Kumar	Daniel Johnson	Marie-Clair Munro	Q Manivannan	Charles Dundas	Nigel Douglas	Hugh Kerr	Mairi Lucas	Ally Maxwell	
Edinburgh and Lothians East	4	Angus Robertson	Catriona Munro	Christopher Cowdy	Kayleigh Kinross-O'Neill	Lewis Younie	David Lees	Jim Daly	Helen Maceachen		
Edinburgh and Lothians East	5	Paul McLennan	Martin Whitfield	Jo Mowat	Chas Booth	Jenny Butler	Charles Turner	Anna Carro	Peter James Cox		
Edinburgh and Lothians East	6	Colin Beattie	Caitlin Stott	Tim Jones	Adam Al-Khateb	Liss Owen	Andrew McLaughlin				
Edinburgh and Lothians East	7	Kelly Parry	James Dalgleish	Rachel Cairns	Jo Phillips	Alan Grant	Gary Neill				
Edinburgh and Lothians East	8	Lyn Jardine	Eleanor Ryan-Saha	Haris Young	Mridul Wadhwa		David Thomson				
Edinburgh and Lothians East	9		Oliver Thomas		Dan Heap		Cameron Rose				
Edinburgh and Lothians East	10				Astri JS Kvassnes						
Edinburgh and Lothians East	11				Alex Staniforth						
Edinburgh and Lothians East	12				Mariusz Cebulski						
Glasgow											
Glasgow	1	Alison Thewliss	Anas Sarwar	Annie Wells	Patrick Harvie	Daniel Khan-O'Malley	Thomas Kerr	Tommy Sheridan	Andrew John Bradie	Liam McLaughlan	ISP (Paul Steele); IGV (Alisdair McConnachie); Christian (John Cormak); Common (Kamran Butt, Adnan Zafar Rafiq, Thomas Adkins, Kenneth Ifeanyu Nwosu); UKIP (Donald Mackay, Ian Garbutt, Lynda Davis, Laurence Keeley); WPB (Yvonne Ridley, George Galloway, Catherine McKerman, Laura Jones); Craig Houston (Independent); Elspeth Lynn Kerr (Independent)
Glasgow	2	Ivan McKee	Pauline McNeill	Sandesh Gulhane	Holly Bruce	Paul Kennedy	Kim Schmulian	Dhruva Kumar	John Paul McArthur	Olivia Murphy	ISP (Paul Steele); IGV (Alisdair McConnachie); Christian (John Cormak); Common (Kamran Butt, Adnan Zafar Rafiq, Thomas Adkins, Kenneth Ifeanyu Nwosu); UKIP (Donald Mackay, Ian Garbutt, Lynda Davis, Laurence Keeley); WPB (Yvonne Ridley, George Galloway, Catherine McKerman, Laura Jones); Craig Houston (Independent); Elspeth Lynn Kerr (Independent)
Glasgow	3	Kaukab Stewart	Paul Sweeney	Ross Hutton	Iris Duane	James Spiers	Audrey Dempsey	Gail Sheridan	Michael James O'Hara	Bill Bonnar	ISP (Paul Steele); IGV (Alisdair McConnachie); Christian (John Cormak); Common (Kamran Butt, Adnan Zafar Rafiq, Thomas Adkins, Kenneth Ifeanyu Nwosu); UKIP (Donald Mackay, Ian Garbutt, Lynda Davis, Laurence Keeley); WPB (Yvonne Ridley, George Galloway, Catherine McKerman, Laura Jones); Craig Houston (Independent); Elspeth Lynn Kerr (Independent)
Glasgow	4	David Linden	Monica Lennon	Kyle Park	Rana Moro Hamed	Rachel Park	Allan Lyons	Hilda McMahon	Agnes Gallagher		ISP (Paul Steele); IGV (Alisdair McConnachie); Christian (John Cormak); Common (Kamran Butt, Adnan Zafar Rafiq, Thomas Adkins, Kenneth Ifeanyu Nwosu); UKIP (Donald Mackay, Ian Garbutt, Lynda Davis, Laurence Keeley); WPB (Yvonne Ridley, George Galloway, Catherine McKerman, Laura Jones); Craig Houston (Independent); Elspeth Lynn Kerr (Independent)
Glasgow	5	Graham Campbell	James Adams	John Murray	Kit Renard	Peter McLaughlin	Paul Bennie				ISP (Paul Steele); IGV (Alisdair McConnachie); Christian (John Cormak); Common (Kamran Butt, Adnan Zafar Rafiq, Thomas Adkins, Kenneth Ifeanyu Nwosu); UKIP (Donald Mackay, Ian Garbutt, Lynda Davis, Laurence Keeley); WPB (Yvonne Ridley, George Galloway, Catherine McKerman, Laura Jones); Craig Houston (Independent); Elspeth Lynn Kerr (Independent)
Glasgow	6	Colm Merrick	Vonnie Sandlan	Josephine MacLeod	Isabele Ruffell	Amy Carman	Aimee Alexander				ISP (Paul Steele); IGV (Alisdair McConnachie); Christian (John Cormak); Common (Kamran Butt, Adnan Zafar Rafiq, Thomas Adkins, Kenneth Ifeanyu Nwosu); UKIP (Donald Mackay, Ian Garbutt, Lynda Davis, Laurence Keeley); WPB (Yvonne Ridley, George Galloway, Catherine McKerman, Laura Jones); Craig Houston (Independent); Elspeth Lynn Kerr (Independent)
Glasgow	7	Declan Blench	Eunis Jassemi	Daniel Bowman		Verity Woolley	Sean O'Hagan				ISP (Paul Steele); IGV (Alisdair McConnachie); Christian (John Cormak); Common (Kamran Butt, Adnan Zafar Rafiq, Thomas Adkins, Kenneth Ifeanyu Nwosu); UKIP (Donald Mackay, Ian Garbutt, Lynda Davis, Laurence Keeley); WPB (Yvonne Ridley, George Galloway, Catherine McKerman, Laura Jones); Craig Houston (Independent); Elspeth Lynn Kerr (Independent)
Glasgow	8	Zen Ghani					Gordon Millar				ISP (Paul Steele); IGV (Alisdair McConnachie); Christian (John Cormak); Common (Kamran Butt, Adnan Zafar Rafiq, Thomas Adkins, Kenneth Ifeanyu Nwosu); UKIP (Donald Mackay, Ian Garbutt, Lynda Davis, Laurence Keeley); WPB (Yvonne Ridley, George Galloway, Catherine McKerman, Laura Jones); Craig Houston (Independent); Elspeth Lynn Kerr (Independent)
Glasgow	9	Annette Christie									ISP (Paul Steele); IGV (Alisdair McConnachie); Christian (John Cormak); Common (Kamran Butt, Adnan Zafar Rafiq, Thomas Adkins, Kenneth Ifeanyu Nwosu); UKIP (Donald Mackay, Ian Garbutt, Lynda Davis, Laurence Keeley); WPB (Yvonne Ridley, George Galloway, Catherine McKerman, Laura Jones); Craig Houston (Independent); Elspeth Lynn Kerr (Independent)
Glasgow	10	Abdul Bostani									ISP (Paul Steele); IGV (Alisdair McConnachie); Christian (John Cormak); Common (Kamran Butt, Adnan Zafar Rafiq, Thomas Adkins, Kenneth Ifeanyu Nwosu); UKIP (Donald Mackay, Ian Garbutt, Lynda Davis, Laurence Keeley); WPB (Yvonne Ridley, George Galloway, Catherine McKerman, Laura Jones); Craig Houston (Independent); Elspeth Lynn Kerr (Independent)
Glasgow	11	Adekemi Giwa									ISP (Paul Steele); IGV (Alisdair McConnachie); Christian (John Cormak); Common (Kamran Butt, Adnan Zafar Rafiq, Thomas Adkins, Kenneth Ifeanyu Nwosu); UKIP (Donald Mackay, Ian Garbutt, Lynda Davis, Laurence Keeley); WPB (Yvonne Ridley, George Galloway, Catherine McKerman, Laura Jones); Craig Houston (Independent); Elspeth Lynn Kerr (Independent)
Glasgow	12	Qasim Hanif									ISP (Paul Steele); IGV (Alisdair McConnachie); Christian (John Cormak); Common (Kamran Butt, Adnan Zafar Rafiq, Thomas Adkins, Kenneth Ifeanyu Nwosu); UKIP (Donald Mackay, Ian Garbutt, Lynda Davis, Laurence Keeley); WPB (Yvonne Ridley, George Galloway, Catherine McKerman, Laura Jones); Craig Houston (Independent); Elspeth Lynn Kerr (Independent)
Highlands and Islands											
Highlands and Islands	1	Maree Todd	Isla McCay	Tim Eagle	Ariane Burgess	Morven-May MacCallum	Vic Currie	Brian Nugent	Kenny Stone	Willie Hamilton	Advance UK (Matt Sheppard, Steve Skerrett); ISP (Fiona Nelson); IGV (Nicola Siddall); Christian (David MacLeod Boyd); Libertarian (Nathan Lumb); Rural (Alasdair Fletcher, Ruraidh Ormston); WPB (Syed Hussain); Duncan MacPherson (Independent); Mick Rice (Independent)
Highlands and Islands	2	Robert Leslie	Donald MacKinnon	Jamie Halcro Johnston	Kristopher Leask	Alan Reid	Max Bannerman	Andrew McDonald	Allan Maceachen	Brenda Nicholson	Advance UK (Matt Sheppard, Steve Skerrett); ISP (Fiona Nelson); IGV (Nicola Siddall); Christian (David MacLeod Boyd); Libertarian (Nathan Lumb); Rural (Alasdair Fletcher, Ruraidh Ormston); WPB (Syed Hussain); Duncan MacPherson (Independent); Mick Rice (Independent)
Highlands and Islands	3	Emma Roddick	Eva Kestner	Helen Crawford	Kate Willis	Declan Gallacher	Amanda Hampsey	Kenneth MacKenzie	Rachel Michelle Gibson		Advance UK (Matt Sheppard, Steve Skerrett); ISP (Fiona Nelson); IGV (Nicola Siddall); Christian (David MacLeod Boyd); Libertarian (Nathan Lumb); Rural (Alasdair Fletcher, Ruraidh Ormston); WPB (Syed Hussain); Duncan MacPherson (Independent); Mick Rice (Independent)
Highlands and Islands	4	Hannah Mary Goodlad	John Erskine	Ruairidh Stewart	Draeyk Van der Horn	Angela MacLean	Fred Campbell	Laùra Hänsler	Eva Morrice		Advance UK (Matt Sheppard, Steve Skerrett); ISP (Fiona Nelson); IGV (Nicola Siddall); Christian (David MacLeod Boyd); Libertarian (Nathan Lumb); Rural (Alasdair Fletcher, Ruraidh Ormston); WPB (Syed Hussain); Duncan MacPherson (Independent); Mick Rice (Independent)
Highlands and Islands	5	Eilidh Munro	Mike MacLeod	George Macpherson	Alex Armitage	Denis Rixson	Malcolm McTaggart	Allan Duffy	Harriet Woolmore		Advance UK (Matt Sheppard, Steve Skerrett); ISP (Fiona Nelson); IGV (Nicola Siddall); Christian (David MacLeod Boyd); Libertarian (Nathan Lumb); Rural (Alasdair Fletcher, Ruraidh Ormston); WPB (Syed Hussain); Duncan MacPherson (Independent); Mick Rice (Independent)
Highlands and Islands	6	Jérémie Fernandes	Callum George	Peter Wallace	Anne Thomas	Guy Grieve	Jon Whitton	Flora Badger			Advance UK (Matt Sheppard, Steve Skerrett); ISP (Fiona Nelson); IGV (Nicola Siddall); Christian (David MacLeod Boyd); Libertarian (Nathan Lumb); Rural (Alasdair Fletcher, Ruraidh Ormston); WPB (Syed Hussain); Duncan MacPherson (Independent); Mick Rice (Independent)
Highlands and Islands	7		Shaun Fraser	Donald MacKenzie	Julie Christie	Fiona Bennett	John Coupland				Advance UK (Matt Sheppard, Steve Skerrett); ISP (Fiona Nelson); IGV (Nicola Siddall); Christian (David MacLeod Boyd); Libertarian (Nathan Lumb); Rural (Alasdair Fletcher, Ruraidh Ormston); WPB (Syed Hussain); Duncan MacPherson (Independent); Mick Rice (Independent)
Highlands and Islands	8		David Blair	Douglas Barnett							Advance UK (Matt Sheppard, Steve Skerrett); ISP (Fiona Nelson); IGV (Nicola Siddall); Christian (David MacLeod Boyd); Libertarian (Nathan Lumb); Rural (Alasdair Fletcher, Ruraidh Ormston); WPB (Syed Hussain); Duncan MacPherson (Independent); Mick Rice (Independent)
Mid Scotland and Fife											
Mid Scotland and Fife	1	John Swinney	Claire Baker	Murdo Fraser	Mark Ruskell	Claire McLaren	Helen McDade	Eva Comrie	Richard Crewe Lucas	Paolo Caserta	Advance UK (Hilary Newton Wheater, Reece Craig Lauder); ISP (John Snowden Forbes); IGV (Alexandra Rose Hardie); Libertarian (Calum Paul)
Mid Scotland and Fife	2	Shirley-Anne Somerville	Joe Long	Stephen Kerr	Mags Hall	Sally Patile	Julie MacDougall	Laurie Moffat	Daniel Gerard Smith	Jack Reekie	Advance UK (Hilary Newton Wheater, Reece Craig Lauder); ISP (John Snowden Forbes); IGV (Alexandra Rose Hardie); Libertarian (Calum Paul)
Mid Scotland and Fife	3	Fiona Law	Fiona Sword	Roz McCall	Caitlin Ripley	Edward Scotcher	Rachael Wright	Jock Penman	Alan Henry Brown		Advance UK (Hilary Newton Wheater, Reece Craig Lauder); ISP (John Snowden Forbes); IGV (Alexandra Rose Hardie); Libertarian (Calum Paul)
Mid Scotland and Fife	4	Alyn Smith	Kainde Manji	Alexander Stewart	Ryan Blackadder	Amanda Clark	Mark Davies	Donal Hurley	Marc Surtees		Advance UK (Hilary Newton Wheater, Reece Craig Lauder); ISP (John Snowden Forbes); IGV (Alexandra Rose Hardie); Libertarian (Calum Paul)
Mid Scotland and Fife	5	Jim Fairlie	Suzanne Graham	Edward Sheasby	Marie Stadlter	Lauren Buchanan-Quigley	Mike Collier	Frank Armstrong			Advance UK (Hilary Newton Wheater, Reece Craig Lauder); ISP (John Snowden Forbes); IGV (Alexandra Rose Hardie); Libertarian (Calum Paul)
Mid Scotland and Fife	6	David Torrance	Angela Bailey	Thomas Heald	Clare Andrews	Jane Ann Liston	Kenneth Morton				Advance UK (Hilary Newton Wheater, Reece Craig Lauder); ISP (John Snowden Forbes); IGV (Alexandra Rose Hardie); Libertarian (Calum Paul)
Mid Scotland and Fife	7	Susan McGill	Elizabeth Carr-Ellis	Darren Watt	Andrew Adam	Fraser Graham	Otto Inglis				Advance UK (Hilary Newton Wheater, Reece Craig Lauder); ISP (John Snowden Forbes); IGV (Alexandra Rose Hardie); Libertarian (Calum Paul)
Mid Scotland and Fife	8	John Beare	Afifa Khanam	Heather Greig	Paul Vallot						Advance UK (Hilary Newton Wheater, Reece Craig Lauder); ISP (John Snowden Forbes); IGV (Alexandra Rose Hardie); Libertarian (Calum Paul)
Mid Scotland and Fife	9	David Mitchell	Luke Thomson	Niamh Heald							Advance UK (Hilary Newton Wheater, Reece Craig Lauder); ISP (John Snowden Forbes); IGV (Alexandra Rose Hardie); Libertarian (Calum Paul)
North East Scotland											
North East Scotland	1	Stephen Flynn	Michael Marra	Liam Kerr	Maggie Chapman	Yi-pei Chou Turvey	Duncan Massey	Stephen Bowie	Euan Morrice	Ross Kenny	Advance UK (Sarah Hashim); ISP (Allan Angus Petrie); IGV (Richard Tallach); WPB (Peter Richard Ashby, Tariq Imtiaz); Marie Boulton (Independent); Iris Leask (Independent)
North East Scotland	2	Gillian Martin	Heather Doran	Douglas Lumsden	Esme Houston	Michael Turvey	Mark Simpson	Konrad Rekas	Susan Ettle	Brian Stewart	Advance UK (Sarah Hashim); ISP (Allan Angus Petrie); IGV (Richard Tallach); WPB (Peter Richard Ashby, Tariq Imtiaz); Marie Boulton (Independent); Iris Leask (Independent)
North East Scotland	3	Fatima Joji	Lynn Thomson	Alexander Burnett	William Linegar	Tanvir Ahmed	Claudia Leith	Brett Morrison	Dave Bestwick		Advance UK (Sarah Hashim); ISP (Allan Angus Petrie); IGV (Richard Tallach); WPB (Peter Richard Ashby, Tariq Imtiaz); Marie Boulton (Independent); Iris Leask (Independent)
North East Scotland	4	Christian Allard	Cheryl-Ann Cruickshank	James Adams	Sylvia Hardie	Jeff Goodhall	Jo Hart	Ronald Hardie	Joana Moore		Advance UK (Sarah Hashim); ISP (Allan Angus Petrie); IGV (Richard Tallach); WPB (Peter Richard Ashby, Tariq Imtiaz); Marie Boulton (Independent); Iris Leask (Independent)
North East Scotland	5	Dawn Black	Simon Watson	Stewart Whyte	Charlotte Horne	Mel Sullivan	Conrad Ritchie	Mark David Mair			Advance UK (Sarah Hashim); ISP (Allan Angus Petrie); IGV (Richard Tallach); WPB (Peter Richard Ashby, Tariq Imtiaz); Marie Boulton (Independent); Iris Leask (Independent)
North East Scotland	6	Miranda Radley	Kate Blake	Hannah Powell	Remi Salvan	Martyn Knights	John Crawley				Advance UK (Sarah Hashim); ISP (Allan Angus Petrie); IGV (Richard Tallach); WPB (Peter Richard Ashby, Tariq Imtiaz); Marie Boulton (Independent); Iris Leask (Independent)
North East Scotland	7	Michael Hutchison	Matthew Lee	Tracey Smith	Fahd Asif	David Evans	Laurie Carnie				Advance UK (Sarah Hashim); ISP (Allan Angus Petrie); IGV (Richard Tallach); WPB (Peter Richard Ashby, Tariq Imtiaz); Marie Boulton (Independent); Iris Leask (Independent)
North East Scotland	8		Janine Langler	Jack Cruickshanks	Gordon Miller		Arthur Keith				Advance UK (Sarah Hashim); ISP (Allan Angus Petrie); IGV (Richard Tallach); WPB (Peter Richard Ashby, Tariq Imtiaz); Marie Boulton (Independent); Iris Leask (Independent)
North East Scotland	9		Brooke Ritchie	Abi Brooks			William Reid				Advance UK (Sarah Hashim); ISP (Allan Angus Petrie); IGV (Richard Tallach); WPB (Peter Richard Ashby, Tariq Imtiaz); Marie Boulton (Independent); Iris Leask (Independent)
South Scotland											
South Scotland	1	Màiri McAllan	Carol Mochan	Rachael Hamilton	Laura Moodie	Duncan Dunlop	Jamie Langan	Terry Howson	Gareth Kirk	Mark Sands	IGV (Maxwell Dunbar); ADF (David Ballantine, Glen Maney); Common (Paul Adkins, Muhammad Tufail); Heritage (David Griffiths, Gisele Skinner, Elspeth Griffiths, Charles McEwan); Libertarian (Daniel Fraser); UKIP (Janice Mackay, Laurie Steele, Robert Bilcliff, Gail Bilcliff, Colin Sullivan); Sean Davis (Independent); Denise Sommerville (Independent)
South Scotland	2	Alan Brown	Joe Fagan	Craig Hoy	Ann McGuinness	Roy Georgeson	David Kirkwood	Garry McClay	Hamish Goldie-Scot	Zoe Greenan	IGV (Maxwell Dunbar); ADF (David Ballantine, Glen Maney); Common (Paul Adkins, Muhammad Tufail); Heritage (David Griffiths, Gisele Skinner, Elspeth Griffiths, Charles McEwan); Libertarian (Daniel Fraser); UKIP (Janice Mackay, Laurie Steele, Robert Bilcliff, Gail Bilcliff, Colin Sullivan); Sean Davis (Independent); Denise Sommerville (Independent)
South Scotland	3	Emma Harper	Linda Dorward	Finlay Carson	Dominic Ashmole	Aisha Mir	Senga Beresford	Yvonne Lazenbury	Laura Shell	Alex Creel	IGV (Maxwell Dunbar); ADF (David Ballantine, Glen Maney); Common (Paul Adkins, Muhammad Tufail); Heritage (David Griffiths, Gisele Skinner, Elspeth Griffiths, Charles McEwan); Libertarian (Daniel Fraser); UKIP (Janice Mackay, Laurie Steele, Robert Bilcliff, Gail Bilcliff, Colin Sullivan); Sean Davis (Independent); Denise Sommerville (Independent)
South Scotland	4	Siobhian Brown	Ewan MacPhee	Sharon Dowey	Neil MacKinnon	Richard Brodie	Tim Kelly	Maureen Johnstone	Josh‑Lee Witherspoon		IGV (Maxwell Dunbar); ADF (David Ballantine, Glen Maney); Common (Paul Adkins, Muhammad Tufail); Heritage (David Griffiths, Gisele Skinner, Elspeth Griffiths, Charles McEwan); Libertarian (Daniel Fraser); UKIP (Janice Mackay, Laurie Steele, Robert Bilcliff, Gail Bilcliff, Colin Sullivan); Sean Davis (Independent); Denise Sommerville (Independent)
South Scotland	5	Katie Hagmann	Lynsey Hamilton	Brian Whittle	Barbara Harvie	Charlotte Olcay	Carolyn Grant	Marjorie Thomson			IGV (Maxwell Dunbar); ADF (David Ballantine, Glen Maney); Common (Paul Adkins, Muhammad Tufail); Heritage (David Griffiths, Gisele Skinner, Elspeth Griffiths, Charles McEwan); Libertarian (Daniel Fraser); UKIP (Janice Mackay, Laurie Steele, Robert Bilcliff, Gail Bilcliff, Colin Sullivan); Sean Davis (Independent); Denise Sommerville (Independent)
South Scotland	6	John Redpath	Daniel Coleman	Keith Cockburn	Cameron Garrett	Michael Gregori	Daniel Clarke				IGV (Maxwell Dunbar); ADF (David Ballantine, Glen Maney); Common (Paul Adkins, Muhammad Tufail); Heritage (David Griffiths, Gisele Skinner, Elspeth Griffiths, Charles McEwan); Libertarian (Daniel Fraser); UKIP (Janice Mackay, Laurie Steele, Robert Bilcliff, Gail Bilcliff, Colin Sullivan); Sean Davis (Independent); Denise Sommerville (Independent)
South Scotland	7	Collette Stevenson	Kaymarie Hughes	Julie Pirone	Tim Clancey	Tracey Warman	John Mcnamee				IGV (Maxwell Dunbar); ADF (David Ballantine, Glen Maney); Common (Paul Adkins, Muhammad Tufail); Heritage (David Griffiths, Gisele Skinner, Elspeth Griffiths, Charles McEwan); Libertarian (Daniel Fraser); UKIP (Janice Mackay, Laurie Steele, Robert Bilcliff, Gail Bilcliff, Colin Sullivan); Sean Davis (Independent); Denise Sommerville (Independent)
South Scotland	8	Stephen Thompson	Davy Russell	James Adams	Tom Kerr		Andrew Russell				IGV (Maxwell Dunbar); ADF (David Ballantine, Glen Maney); Common (Paul Adkins, Muhammad Tufail); Heritage (David Griffiths, Gisele Skinner, Elspeth Griffiths, Charles McEwan); Libertarian (Daniel Fraser); UKIP (Janice Mackay, Laurie Steele, Robert Bilcliff, Gail Bilcliff, Colin Sullivan); Sean Davis (Independent); Denise Sommerville (Independent)
South Scotland	9	Alex Kerr	Brian McGinley	Tracey Clark	Korin Vallance		Andrew Scott				IGV (Maxwell Dunbar); ADF (David Ballantine, Glen Maney); Common (Paul Adkins, Muhammad Tufail); Heritage (David Griffiths, Gisele Skinner, Elspeth Griffiths, Charles McEwan); Libertarian (Daniel Fraser); UKIP (Janice Mackay, Laurie Steele, Robert Bilcliff, Gail Bilcliff, Colin Sullivan); Sean Davis (Independent); Denise Sommerville (Independent)
South Scotland	10	Allan Dorans	Jack McConnel				Anne Millar				IGV (Maxwell Dunbar); ADF (David Ballantine, Glen Maney); Common (Paul Adkins, Muhammad Tufail); Heritage (David Griffiths, Gisele Skinner, Elspeth Griffiths, Charles McEwan); Libertarian (Daniel Fraser); UKIP (Janice Mackay, Laurie Steele, Robert Bilcliff, Gail Bilcliff, Colin Sullivan); Sean Davis (Independent); Denise Sommerville (Independent)
South Scotland	11	Kirsty Campbell									IGV (Maxwell Dunbar); ADF (David Ballantine, Glen Maney); Common (Paul Adkins, Muhammad Tufail); Heritage (David Griffiths, Gisele Skinner, Elspeth Griffiths, Charles McEwan); Libertarian (Daniel Fraser); UKIP (Janice Mackay, Laurie Steele, Robert Bilcliff, Gail Bilcliff, Colin Sullivan); Sean Davis (Independent); Denise Sommerville (Independent)
South Scotland	12	Ross Clark									IGV (Maxwell Dunbar); ADF (David Ballantine, Glen Maney); Common (Paul Adkins, Muhammad Tufail); Heritage (David Griffiths, Gisele Skinner, Elspeth Griffiths, Charles McEwan); Libertarian (Daniel Fraser); UKIP (Janice Mackay, Laurie Steele, Robert Bilcliff, Gail Bilcliff, Colin Sullivan); Sean Davis (Independent); Denise Sommerville (Independent)
West Scotland											
West Scotland	1	Stuart McMillan	Jackie Baillie	Russell Findlay	Ross Greer	Adam Harley	Malcolm Offord	Gordon Ross	Liam McKechnie	Veronica Edgely	ADF (Ken Thomson, Ian Gibson); ISP (Colette Walker); IGV (Ian Inkster); Common (Claire Gallagher); Libertarian (Alan William Findlay, Cameron Alexander Milne); SLP (James McDaid, Louise McDaid, Bobby Cochrane, Bryan McLardy, David Jacobsen); Liberal (Allan Steele, Andrew MacGregor); UKIP (Ben Walker, Mike Pursglove, Gillian Ammoun); Paul Mack (Independent); Paddy McCarthy (Independent); William Wallace (Independent)
West Scotland	2	Kirsten Oswald	Neil Bibby	Jackson Carlaw	Cara McKee	Jamie Greene	David Smith	Simon McLean	Luke Reid	Jonathan Judge	ADF (Ken Thomson, Ian Gibson); ISP (Colette Walker); IGV (Ian Inkster); Common (Claire Gallagher); Libertarian (Alan William Findlay, Cameron Alexander Milne); SLP (James McDaid, Louise McDaid, Bobby Cochrane, Bryan McLardy, David Jacobsen); Liberal (Allan Steele, Andrew MacGregor); UKIP (Ben Walker, Mike Pursglove, Gillian Ammoun); Paul Mack (Independent); Paddy McCarthy (Independent); William Wallace (Independent)
West Scotland	3	Michelle Campbell	Katy Clark	Pam Gosal	Karen Sharkey	Christine Murdoch	Moira Ramage	Ken McNeil	Matt Lynch	Colin Edgely	ADF (Ken Thomson, Ian Gibson); ISP (Colette Walker); IGV (Ian Inkster); Common (Claire Gallagher); Libertarian (Alan William Findlay, Cameron Alexander Milne); SLP (James McDaid, Louise McDaid, Bobby Cochrane, Bryan McLardy, David Jacobsen); Liberal (Allan Steele, Andrew MacGregor); UKIP (Ben Walker, Mike Pursglove, Gillian Ammoun); Paul Mack (Independent); Paddy McCarthy (Independent); William Wallace (Independent)
West Scotland	4	Patricia Gibson	Paul O'Kane	Alix Mathieson	Paula Baker	Grant Toghill	Mike Mann	Ian Vallance	Paul Gallacher		ADF (Ken Thomson, Ian Gibson); ISP (Colette Walker); IGV (Ian Inkster); Common (Claire Gallagher); Libertarian (Alan William Findlay, Cameron Alexander Milne); SLP (James McDaid, Louise McDaid, Bobby Cochrane, Bryan McLardy, David Jacobsen); Liberal (Allan Steele, Andrew MacGregor); UKIP (Ben Walker, Mike Pursglove, Gillian Ammoun); Paul Mack (Independent); Paddy McCarthy (Independent); William Wallace (Independent)
West Scotland	5	Kenneth Gibson	Francesca Brennan	Gary Mulvaney	Ross Collins	Emma Farthing-Sykes	Matthew McLean	Eammon Gallagher			ADF (Ken Thomson, Ian Gibson); ISP (Colette Walker); IGV (Ian Inkster); Common (Claire Gallagher); Libertarian (Alan William Findlay, Cameron Alexander Milne); SLP (James McDaid, Louise McDaid, Bobby Cochrane, Bryan McLardy, David Jacobsen); Liberal (Allan Steele, Andrew MacGregor); UKIP (Ben Walker, Mike Pursglove, Gillian Ammoun); Paul Mack (Independent); Paddy McCarthy (Independent); William Wallace (Independent)
West Scotland	6	Tom Arthur	Kayleigh Quinn	Maurice Corry		Ross Stalker	Andrew White				ADF (Ken Thomson, Ian Gibson); ISP (Colette Walker); IGV (Ian Inkster); Common (Claire Gallagher); Libertarian (Alan William Findlay, Cameron Alexander Milne); SLP (James McDaid, Louise McDaid, Bobby Cochrane, Bryan McLardy, David Jacobsen); Liberal (Allan Steele, Andrew MacGregor); UKIP (Ben Walker, Mike Pursglove, Gillian Ammoun); Paul Mack (Independent); Paddy McCarthy (Independent); William Wallace (Independent)
West Scotland	7	Sophie Traynor	Mike McKirdy	Jack Hall		Elaine Ford					ADF (Ken Thomson, Ian Gibson); ISP (Colette Walker); IGV (Ian Inkster); Common (Claire Gallagher); Libertarian (Alan William Findlay, Cameron Alexander Milne); SLP (James McDaid, Louise McDaid, Bobby Cochrane, Bryan McLardy, David Jacobsen); Liberal (Allan Steele, Andrew MacGregor); UKIP (Ben Walker, Mike Pursglove, Gillian Ammoun); Paul Mack (Independent); Paddy McCarthy (Independent); William Wallace (Independent)
West Scotland	8	Denis Johnston	Colette McDiarmid	Ronnie Stalker							ADF (Ken Thomson, Ian Gibson); ISP (Colette Walker); IGV (Ian Inkster); Common (Claire Gallagher); Libertarian (Alan William Findlay, Cameron Alexander Milne); SLP (James McDaid, Louise McDaid, Bobby Cochrane, Bryan McLardy, David Jacobsen); Liberal (Allan Steele, Andrew MacGregor); UKIP (Ben Walker, Mike Pursglove, Gillian Ammoun); Paul Mack (Independent); Paddy McCarthy (Independent); William Wallace (Independent)
West Scotland	9	Michael Gibbons	Matthew McGowan	Farooq Choudhry							ADF (Ken Thomson, Ian Gibson); ISP (Colette Walker); IGV (Ian Inkster); Common (Claire Gallagher); Libertarian (Alan William Findlay, Cameron Alexander Milne); SLP (James McDaid, Louise McDaid, Bobby Cochrane, Bryan McLardy, David Jacobsen); Liberal (Allan Steele, Andrew MacGregor); UKIP (Ben Walker, Mike Pursglove, Gillian Ammoun); Paul Mack (Independent); Paddy McCarthy (Independent); William Wallace (Independent)
West Scotland	10	Andrew Steel		Ted Runciman							ADF (Ken Thomson, Ian Gibson); ISP (Colette Walker); IGV (Ian Inkster); Common (Claire Gallagher); Libertarian (Alan William Findlay, Cameron Alexander Milne); SLP (James McDaid, Louise McDaid, Bobby Cochrane, Bryan McLardy, David Jacobsen); Liberal (Allan Steele, Andrew MacGregor); UKIP (Ben Walker, Mike Pursglove, Gillian Ammoun); Paul Mack (Independent); Paddy McCarthy (Independent); William Wallace (Independent)

== MSPs who lost their seats ==
A list of MSPs who were unseated:

MSP	Constituency/Region	Party
Monica Lennon	Central Scotland	Labour
Angus Robertson	Edinburgh Central	SNP
Kaukab Stewart	Glasgow Southside	SNP
Jackson Carlaw	Eastwood	Conservative
Sandesh Gulhane	Glasgow	Conservative
Jamie Greene	West Scotland	Conservative/Lib Dem
Fergus Ewing	Inverness and Nairn	SNP/Independent
Ash Regan	Edinburgh and Lothians East	SNP/Alba/Independent
Sharon Dowey	South Scotland	Conservative
Alexander Stewart	Mid Scotland and Fife	Conservative
Brian Whittle	South Scotland	Conservative
Annie Wells	Glasgow	Conservative
Pam Gosal	West Scotland	Conservative
Martin Whitfield	South Scotland	Labour
Alasdair Allan	Na h-Eileanan an Iar	SNP
Davy Russell	Hamilton, Larkhall and Stonehouse	Labour
Jamie Halcro Johnston	Highlands and Islands	Conservative
Roz McCall	Mid Scotland and Fife	Conservative
Paul O'Kane	West Scotland	Labour
Sue Webber	Lothian	Conservative
Emma Harper	South Scotland	SNP
