= 7th Scottish Parliament =

Legislature elected in 2026

←	6th Scottish Parliament
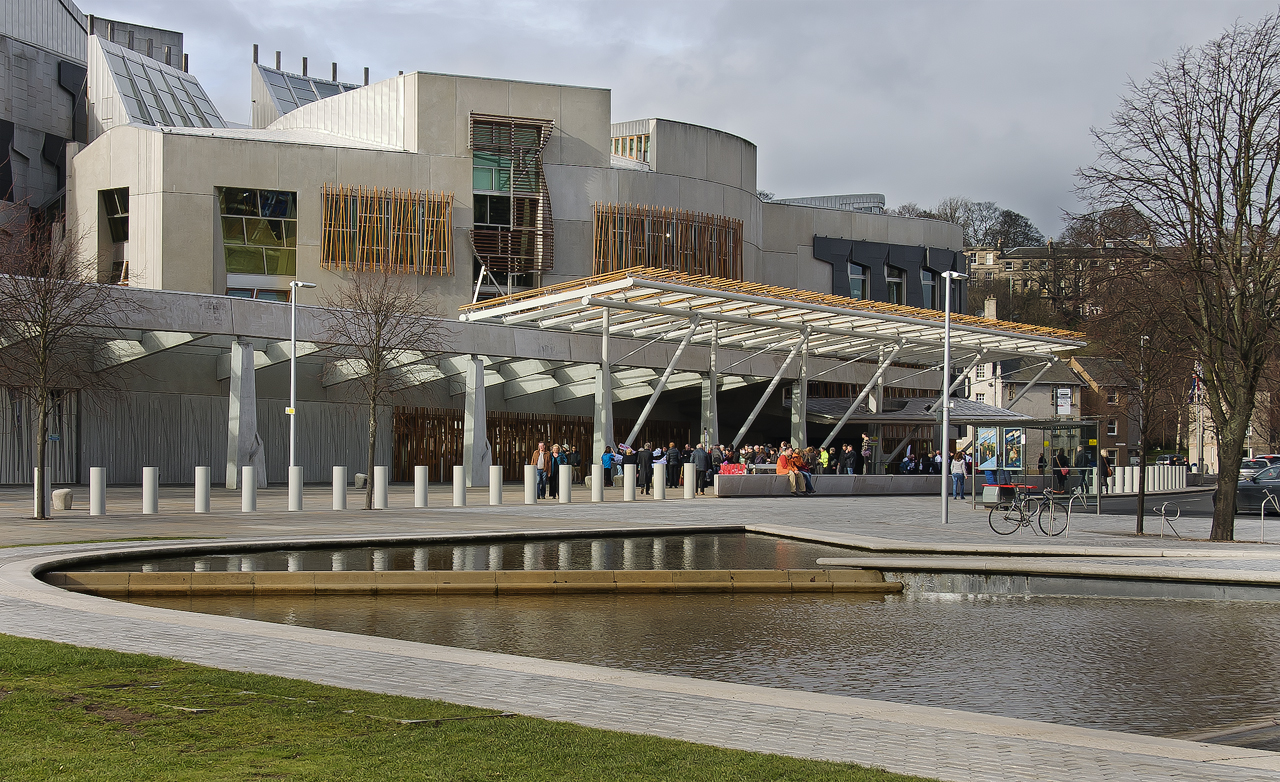
- Scottish Parliament Building

Overview
- Legislative body: Scottish Parliament
- Jurisdiction: Scotland
- Meeting place: Scottish Parliament Building
- Term: 14 May 2026 –
- Election: 2026
- Government: Swinney II
- Members: 129
- Presiding Officer: Kenneth Gibson
- First Minister: John Swinney
- Deputy First Minister: Jenny Gilruth
- Leader of the largest opposition party/parties: List: Anas Sarwar & Malcolm Offord (May–Jul 2026); Jackie Baillie & Malcolm Offord (Jul–Sep 2026); Michael Marra & Malcolm Offord (Sep–Oct 2026); Michael Marra (since Oct 2026)

The 7th Scottish Parliament was elected at the 2026 Scottish Parliament election. New MSPs were sworn in on 14 May 2026.

== Composition ==
Party		May 2026 election	Currently
•	Scottish National Party	58	57
	Scottish Labour	17 (Note: Includes 7 MSPs sponsored by the Co-operative Party, who are designated Labour and Co-operative.)	17 (Note: Includes 7 MSPs sponsored by the Co-operative Party, who are designated Labour and Co-operative.)
	Reform Party Scotland	17	16
	Scottish Greens	15	15
	Scottish Conservatives	12	12
	Scottish Liberal Democrats	10	10
	Independent	0	1
	Presiding Officer	0	1
Total		129	
Government majority		-13	-15

Government parties denoted with bullets (•)

== Leadership ==
- Presiding Officer: Kenneth Gibson (Independent) (Note: Gibson was elected as SNP MSP but relinquished his membership in order to take the office of Presiding Officer.)
- Deputy Presiding Officers: Clare Adamson (SNP), Katy Clark (Labour)

== List of MSPs ==
The changes table below records all changes in party affiliation during the session, since the May 2026 election.

Name	Image	Member for	Type	Party	Member since
George Adam		Paisley	Constituency	Scottish National Party	5 May 2011
Karen Adam		Banffshire and Buchan Coast	Constituency	Scottish National Party	6 May 2021
James Adams		North East Scotland	Regional	Conservatives	23 June 2026
Clare Adamson		Motherwell and Wishaw	Constituency	Scottish National Party	5 May 2011
Irshad Ahmed		Edinburgh and Lothians East	Regional	Labour	7 May 2026
Heather Anderson		Dundee City West	Constituency	Scottish National Party	7 May 2026
Tom Arthur		Renfrewshire West and Levern Valley	Constituency	Scottish National Party	5 May 2016
Jackie Baillie		Dumbarton	Constituency	Labour	6 May 1999
Claire Baker		Mid Scotland and Fife	Regional	Labour Co-op	3 May 2007
Max Bannerman		Highlands and Islands	Regional	Reform UK	7 May 2026
David Barratt		Cowdenbeath	Constituency	Scottish National Party	7 May 2026
Andrew Baxter		Skye, Lochaber and Badenoch	Constituency	Liberal Democrats	7 May 2026
Colin Beattie		Midlothian North	Constituency	Scottish National Party	5 May 2011
Senga Beresford		South Scotland	Regional	Reform UK	7 May 2026
Neil Bibby		West Scotland	Regional	Labour Co-op	5 May 2011
Dawn Black		Angus North and Mearns	Constituency	Scottish National Party	7 May 2026
Amanda Bland		Central Scotland and Lothians West	Regional	Independent	7 May 2026
Steven Bonnar		Uddingston and Bellshill	Constituency	Scottish National Party	7 May 2026
Gary Bouse		Falkirk West	Constituency	Scottish National Party	7 May 2026
Miles Briggs		Edinburgh and Lothians East	Regional	Conservatives	5 May 2016
Alan Brown		Kilmarnock and Irvine Valley	Constituency	Scottish National Party	7 May 2026
Keith Brown		Clackmannanshire and Dunblane	Constituency	Scottish National Party	3 May 2007
Siobhian Brown		Ayr	Constituency	Scottish National Party	6 May 2021
Holly Bruce		Glasgow Southside	Constituency	Greens	7 May 2026
Ariane Burgess		Highlands and Islands	Regional	Greens	6 May 2021
Alexander Burnett		Aberdeenshire West	Constituency	Conservatives	5 May 2016
Kate Campbell		Edinburgh Eastern, Musselburgh and Tranent	Constituency	Scottish National Party	7 May 2026
Michelle Campbell		Renfrewshire North and Cardonald	Constituency	Scottish National Party	7 May 2026
Finlay Carson		Galloway and West Dumfries	Constituency	Conservatives	5 May 2016
Maggie Chapman		North East Scotland	Regional	Greens	6 May 2021
Yi-pei Chou Turvey		North East Scotland	Regional	Liberal Democrats	7 May 2026
Katy Clark		West Scotland	Regional	Labour	6 May 2021
Alex Cole-Hamilton		Edinburgh North Western	Constituency	Liberal Democrats	5 May 2016
Angela Constance		Almond Valley	Constituency	Scottish National Party	3 May 2007
Vic Currie		Highlands and Islands	Regional	Reform UK	7 May 2026
Martyn Day		Falkirk East and Linlithgow	Constituency	Scottish National Party	7 May 2026
Sanne Dijkstra-Downie		Edinburgh Northern	Constituency	Liberal Democrats	7 May 2026
Bob Doris		Glasgow Kelvin and Maryhill	Constituency	Scottish National Party	3 May 2007
Iris Duane		Glasgow	Regional	Greens	7 May 2026
Jackie Dunbar		Aberdeen Donside	Constituency	Scottish National Party	6 May 2021
Duncan Dunlop		South Scotland	Regional	Liberal Democrats	7 May 2026
Tim Eagle		Highlands and Islands	Regional	Conservatives	13 February 2024
Joe Fagan		South Scotland	Regional	Labour	7 May 2026
Jim Fairlie		Perthshire South and Kinross-shire	Constituency	Scottish National Party	6 May 2021
Russell Findlay		West Scotland	Regional	Conservatives	6 May 2021
Stephen Flynn		Aberdeen Deeside and North Kincardine	Constituency	Scottish National Party	7 May 2026
Murdo Fraser		Mid Scotland and Fife	Regional	Conservatives	10 August 2001
Meghan Gallacher		Central Scotland and Lothians West	Regional	Conservatives	6 May 2021
Stephen Gethins		Dundee City East	Constituency	Scottish National Party	7 May 2026
Zen Ghani		Glasgow Cathcart and Pollok	Constituency	Scottish National Party	7 May 2026
Kenneth Gibson		Cunninghame North	Constituency	Presiding Officer	3 May 2007; Previously 6 May 1999 – 31 March 2003
Patricia Gibson		Cunninghame South	Constituency	Scottish National Party	7 May 2026
Jenny Gilruth		Mid Fife and Glenrothes	Constituency	Scottish National Party	5 May 2016
Hannah Mary Goodlad		Shetland Islands	Constituency	Scottish National Party	7 May 2026
Neil Gray		Airdrie	Constituency	Scottish National Party	6 May 2021
David Green		Caithness, Sutherland and Ross	Constituency	Liberal Democrats	7 May 2026
Ross Greer		West Scotland	Regional	Greens	5 May 2016
Mark Griffin		Central Scotland and Lothians West	Regional	Labour	5 May 2011
Katie Hagmann		Carrick, Cumnock and Doon Valley	Constituency	Scottish National Party	7 May 2026
Rachael Hamilton		Ettrick, Roxburgh and Berwickshire	Constituency	Conservatives	5 May 2016
Adam Harley		Strathkelvin and Bearsden	Constituency	Liberal Democrats	7 May 2026
Patrick Harvie		Glasgow	Regional	Greens	1 May 2003
Clare Haughey		Rutherglen and Cambuslang	Constituency	Scottish National Party	5 May 2016
Jamie Hepburn		Cumbernauld and Kilsyth	Constituency	Scottish National Party	3 May 2007
Craig Hoy		Dumfriesshire	Constituency	Conservatives	6 May 2021
Daniel Johnson		Edinburgh Southern	Constituency	Labour Co-op	5 May 2016
Alex Kerr		Hamilton, Larkhall and Stonehouse	Constituency	Scottish National Party	7 May 2026
Calum Kerr		Midlothian South, Tweeddale and Lauderdale	Constituency	Scottish National Party	7 May 2026
Liam Kerr		North East Scotland	Regional	Conservatives	5 May 2016
Stephen Kerr		Mid Scotland and Fife	Regional	Conservatives	6 May 2021
Thomas Kerr		Glasgow	Regional	Reform UK	7 May 2026
Kayleigh Kinross-O'Neill		Edinburgh and Lothians East	Regional	Greens	7 May 2026
David Kirkwood		South Scotland	Regional	Reform UK	7 May 2026
Simita Kumar		Edinburgh South Western	Constituency	Scottish National Party	7 May 2026
Jamie Langan		South Scotland	Regional	Reform UK	7 May 2026
Kristopher Leask		Highlands and Islands	Regional	Greens	7 May 2026
Monica Lennon		Glasgow	Regional	Labour Co-op	29 July 2026; Previously 5 May 2016 – 9 April 2026
David Linden		Glasgow Baillieston and Shettleston	Constituency	Scottish National Party	7 May 2026
Amanda Lindsay		Central Scotland and Lothians West	Regional	Reform UK	7 May 2026
Joe Long		Mid Scotland and Fife	Regional	Labour Co-op	7 May 2026
Morven-May MacCallum		Highlands and Islands	Regional	Liberal Democrats	7 May 2026
Julie MacDougall		Mid Scotland and Fife	Regional	Reform UK	7 May 2026
Fulton MacGregor		Coatbridge and Chryston	Constituency	Scottish National Party	5 May 2016
Gillian Mackay		Central Scotland and Lothians West	Regional	Greens	6 May 2021
Donald MacKinnon		Na h-Eileanan an Iar	Constituency	Labour	7 May 2026
Ben Macpherson		Edinburgh North Eastern and Leith	Constituency	Scottish National Party	5 May 2016
Michael Marra		North East Scotland	Regional	Labour	6 May 2021
Gillian Martin		Aberdeenshire East	Constituency	Scottish National Party	5 May 2016
Duncan Massey		North East Scotland	Regional	Reform UK	7 May 2026
Màiri McAllan		Clydesdale	Constituency	Scottish National Party	6 May 2021
Liam McArthur		Orkney Islands	Constituency	Liberal Democrats	3 May 2007
Helen McDade		Mid Scotland and Fife	Regional	Reform UK	7 May 2026
Cara McKee		West Scotland	Regional	Greens	7 May 2026
Ivan McKee		Glasgow Easterhouse and Springburn	Constituency	Scottish National Party	5 May 2016
Paul McLennan		East Lothian Coast and Lammermuirs	Constituency	Scottish National Party	6 May 2021
Stuart McMillan		Inverclyde	Constituency	Scottish National Party	3 May 2007
Marie McNair		Clydebank and Milngavie	Constituency	Scottish National Party	6 May 2021
Pauline McNeill		Glasgow	Regional	Labour Co-op	5 May 2016; Previously 6 May 1999 – 22 March 2011
Lloyd Melville		Angus South	Constituency	Scottish National Party	7 May 2026
Colm Merrick		Glasgow Anniesland	Constituency	Scottish National Party	7 May 2026
Jack Middleton		Aberdeen Central	Constituency	Scottish National Party	7 May 2026
Jenni Minto		Argyll and Bute	Constituency	Scottish National Party	6 May 2021
Laura Mitchell		Moray	Constituency	Scottish National Party	7 May 2026
Carol Mochan		South Scotland	Regional	Labour	6 May 2021
Laura Moodie		South Scotland	Regional	Greens	7 May 2026
Kate Nevens		Edinburgh and Lothians East	Regional	Greens	7 May 2026
Malcolm Offord		West Scotland	Regional	Reform UK	7 May 2026
Kirsten Oswald		Eastwood	Constituency	Scottish National Party	7 May 2026
Q Manivannan		Edinburgh and Lothians East	Regional	Greens	7 May 2026
Willie Rennie		Fife North East	Constituency	Liberal Democrats	5 May 2011
Emma Roddick		Inverness and Nairn	Constituency	Scottish National Party	7 May 2026
Angela Ross		Edinburgh and Lothians East	Regional	Reform UK	7 May 2026
Mark Ruskell		Mid Scotland and Fife	Regional	Greens	5 May 2016; Previously 1 May 2003 – 2 April 2007
Katherine Sangster		Edinburgh and Lothians East	Regional	Labour	7 May 2026
Kim Schmulian		Glasgow	Regional	Reform UK	7 May 2026
Graham Simpson		Central Scotland and Lothians West	Regional	Reform UK	5 May 2016
Mark Simpson		North East Scotland	Regional	Reform UK	7 May 2026
Lorna Slater		Edinburgh Central	Constituency	Greens	6 May 2021
Alyn Smith		Stirling	Constituency	Scottish National Party	7 May 2026
David Smith		West Scotland	Regional	Reform UK	7 May 2026
Shirley-Anne Somerville		Dunfermline	Constituency	Scottish National Party	5 May 2016; Previously 31 August 2007 – 22 March 2011
Pauline Stafford		Bathgate	Constituency	Scottish National Party	7 May 2026
Collette Stevenson		East Kilbride	Constituency	Scottish National Party	6 May 2021
Paul Sweeney		Glasgow	Regional	Labour Co-op	6 May 2021
John Swinney		Perthshire North	Constituency	Scottish National Party	6 May 1999
Alison Thewliss		Glasgow Central	Constituency	Scottish National Party	7 May 2026
Maree Todd		Highlands and Islands	Regional	Scottish National Party	5 May 2016
David Torrance		Kirkcaldy	Constituency	Scottish National Party	5 May 2011
Jenny Young		Central Scotland and Lothians West	Regional	Labour	7 May 2026

=== Former MSPs ===
Name	Image	Member for	Type	Party	Member from
Douglas Lumsden		North East Scotland	Regional	Conservatives	6 May 2021 – 23 June 2026
Anas Sarwar		Glasgow	Regional	Labour Co-op	5 May 2016 – 23 July 2026

== Changes ==
Date	Constituency/region	Gain	Loss	Note
14 May 2026	Cunninghame North	Presiding Officer	SNP	Kenneth Gibson was elected Presiding Officer and consequently resigned his party affiliation.
24 June 2026	North East Scotland	Conservative	Conservative	Douglas Lumsden resigned his seat in the Scottish Parliament after his election to the UK Parliament in the 2026 Aberdeen South by-election. He was succeeded by James Adams, who was sworn in on 24 June.
22 July 2026	Glasgow	Labour Co-op	Labour Co-op	Anas Sarwar resigned his seat in the Scottish Parliament and as Scottish Labour leader after his elevation to the House of Lords following his appointment to the Burnham ministry as Minister of State for Trade. He was succeeded by Monica Lennon, who was sworn in on 29 July 2026.
19 October 2026	Central Scotland and Lothians West	Independent	Reform	Amanda Bland quit as a member of Reform UK Scotland. This led to the party becoming the third largest in the parliament, having previously held the same number of seats as Scottish Labour.
