= List of female members of the Scottish Parliament =

This is a list of women who are or have been members of the Scottish Parliament.

== List of female members of the Scottish Parliament ==
Party	Name	Constituency or Region	Type	Start	End	Reason	Ref(s)
Labour	Wendy Alexander (Note: Also served as a Member of the House of Lords.)	Paisley North	Constituency	1999	2011	Retired	
Labour	Jackie Baillie	Dumbarton	Constituency	1999	present	Serving	
Labour Co-op	Sarah Boyack	Edinburgh Central	Constituency	1999	2011	Defeated	
Labour Co-op	Sarah Boyack	Lothian	Region	2011	2016	Defeated	
Labour Co-op	Sarah Boyack	Lothian	Region	2019	2026	Retired	
Labour Co-op	Rhona Brankin	Midlothian	Constituency	1999	2011	Retired	
Labour	Cathie Craigie	Cumbernauld and Kilsyth	Constituency	1999	2011	Defeated	
SNP	Roseanna Cunningham (Note: Also served as a Member of Parliament (MP).)	Perth	Constituency	1999	2011	Constituency abolished	
SNP	Roseanna Cunningham	Perthshire South and Kinross-shire	Constituency	2011	2021	Retired	
Labour	Margaret Curran	Glasgow Baillieston	Constituency	1999	2011	Retired	
Labour	Susan Deacon	Edinburgh East and Musselburgh	Constituency	1999	2007	Retired	
Labour Co-op	Helen Eadie	Dunfermline East	Constituency	1999	2011	Constituency abolished	
Labour Co-op	Helen Eadie	Cowdenbeath	Constituency	2011	2013	Died	
SNP	Dorothy-Grace Elder	Glasgow	Region	1999	2002	Resigned from the SNP	
Independent	Dorothy-Grace Elder	Glasgow	Region	2002	2003	Retired	
SNP	Margaret Ewing	Moray	Constituency	1999	2006	Died	
SNP	Winnie Ewing (Note: Also served as a Member of the European Parliament (MEP).)	Highlands and Islands	Region	1999	2003	Retired	
SNP	Linda Fabiani	Central Scotland	Region	1999	2011	Elected for constituency	
SNP	Linda Fabiani	East Kilbride	Constituency	2011	2021	Retired	
Labour	Patricia Ferguson	Glasgow Maryhill	Constituency	1999	2011	Constituency abolished	
Labour	Patricia Ferguson	Glasgow Maryhill and Springburn	Constituency	2011	2016	Defeated	
Labour	Karen Gillon	Clydesdale	Constituency	1999	2011	Defeated	
Labour	Trish Godman	West Renfrewshire	Constituency	1999	2011	Retired	
Conservative	Annabel Goldie	West of Scotland	Region	1999	2011	Region abolished	
Conservative	Annabel Goldie	West Scotland	Region	2011	2016	Retired	
SNP	Christine Grahame	South of Scotland	Region	1999	2011	Elected to constituency	
SNP	Christine Grahame	Midlothian South, Tweeddale and Lauderdale	Constituency	2011	2026	Retired	
Labour Co-op	Rhoda Grant	Highlands and Islands	Region	1999	2003	Defeated	
Labour Co-op	Rhoda Grant	Highlands and Islands	Region	2007	2026	Retired	
Labour	Janis Hughes	Glasgow Rutherglen	Constituency	1999	2007	Retired	
SNP	Fiona Hyslop	Lothians	Region	1999	2011	Elected for constituency	
SNP	Fiona Hyslop	Linlithgow	Constituency	2011	2026	Retired	
Labour	Sylvia Jackson	Stirling	Constituency	1999	2007	Defeated	
Labour Co-op	Cathy Jamieson	Carrick, Cumnock and Doon Valley	Constituency	1999	2011	Retired	
Labour	Margaret Jamieson	Kilmarnock and Loudoun	Constituency	1999	2007	Defeated	
Labour Co-op	Johann Lamont	Glasgow Pollok	Constituency	1999	2016	Defeated	
Labour Co-op	Johann Lamont	Glasgow	Region	2016	2021	Retired	
Labour Co-op	Marilyn Livingstone	Kirkcaldy	Constituency	1999	2011	Defeated	
SNP	Margo MacDonald	Lothians	Region	1999	2003	Expelled from the SNP	
Independent	Margo MacDonald	Lothians	Region	2003	2014	Died	
Labour	Kate Maclean	Dundee West	Constituency	1999	2007	Defeated	
Labour	Maureen Macmillan	Highlands and Islands	Region	1999	2007	Defeated	
SNP	Tricia Marwick (Note: Suspended party membership while serving as Presiding Officer of the Scottish Parliament, as is customary.)	Mid Scotland and Fife	Region	1999	2007	Elected for constituency	
SNP	Tricia Marwick	Central Fife	Constituency	2007	2011	Constituency abolished	
SNP	Tricia Marwick	Mid Fife and Glenrothes	Constituency	2011	2016	Retired	
SNP	Irene McGugan	North East Scotland	Region	1999	2003	Defeated	
Conservative	Lyndsay McIntosh	Central Scotland	Region	1999	2003	Defeated	
SNP	Fiona McLeod	West of Scotland	Region	1999	2003	Defeated	
SNP	Fiona McLeod	Strathkelvin and Bearsden	Constituency	2011	2016	Retired	
Labour Co-op	Pauline McNeill	Glasgow Kelvin	Constituency	1999	2011	Defeated	
Labour Co-op	Pauline McNeill	Glasgow	Region	2016	present	Serving	
Labour	Mary Mulligan	Linlithgow	Constituency	1999	2011	Defeated	
Labour	Elaine Murray	Dumfries	Constituency	1999	2011	Constituency abolished	
Labour	Elaine Murray	Dumfriesshire	Constituency	2011	2016	Defeated	
Labour	Irene Oldfather	Cunninghame South	Constituency	1999	2011	Defeated	
Labour	Cathy Peattie	Falkirk East	Constituency	1999	2011	Defeated	
Liberal Democrats	Nora Radcliffe	Gordon	Constituency	1999	2007	Defeated	
SNP	Shona Robison	North East Scotland	Region	1999	2003	Elected for constituency	
SNP	Shona Robison	Dundee East	Constituency	2003	2011	Constituency abolished	
SNP	Shona Robison	Dundee City East	Constituency	2011	2026	Retired	
Conservative	Mary Scanlon	Highlands and Islands	Region	1999	2016	Retired	
Labour	Elaine Smith	Coatbridge and Chryston	Constituency	1999	2016	Defeated	
Labour	Elaine Smith	Central Scotland	Region	2016	2021	Retired	
Liberal Democrats	Margaret Smith	Edinburgh West	Constituency	1999	2011	Defeated	
SNP	Nicola Sturgeon	Glasgow	Region	1999	2007	Elected for constituency	
SNP	Nicola Sturgeon	Glasgow Govan	Constituency	2007	2011	Constituency abolished	
SNP	Nicola Sturgeon	Glasgow Southside	Constituency	2011	2026	Retired	
Labour	Elaine Thomson	Aberdeen North	Constituency	1999	2003	Defeated	
SNP	Kay Ullrich	West of Scotland	Region	1999	2003	Retired	
SNP	Sandra White	Glasgow	Region	1999	2011	Elected for constituency	
SNP	Sandra White	Glasgow Kelvin	Constituency	2011	2021	Retired	
Labour	Karen Whitefield	Airdrie and Shotts	Constituency	1999	2011	Defeated	
Scottish Socialist	Rosemary Byrne	South of Scotland	Region	2003	2006	Resigned from the SSP	
Solidarity	Rosemary Byrne	South of Scotland	Region	2006	2007	Defeated	
Scottish Socialist	Frances Curran	West of Scotland	Region	2003	2007	Defeated	
Labour	Marlyn Glen	North East Scotland	Region	2003	2011	Retired	
Scottish Socialist	Rosie Kane	Glasgow	Region	2003	2007	Defeated	
Scottish Socialist	Carolyn Leckie	Central Scotland	Region	2003	2007	Defeated	
Labour Co-op	Christine May	Central Fife	Constituency	2003	2007	Defeated	
Conservative	Nanette Milne	North East Scotland	Region	2003	2016	Retired	
Conservative	Margaret Mitchell	Central Scotland	Region	2003	2021	Retired	
Green	Eleanor Scott	Highlands and Islands	Region	2003	2007	Defeated	
Independent	Jean Turner	Strathkelvin and Bearsden	Constituency	2003	2007	Defeated	
SNP	Maureen Watt	North East Scotland	Region	2006	2011	Retired	
SNP	Maureen Watt	Aberdeen South and North Kincardine	Constituency	2011	2021	Retired	
Labour Co-op	Claire Baker	Mid Scotland and Fife	Region	2007	present	Serving	
SNP	Aileen Campbell	South of Scotland	Region	2007	2011	Elected for constituency	
SNP	Aileen Campbell	Clydesdale	Constituency	2011	2021	Retired	
SNP	Angela Constance	Livingston	Constituency	2007	2011	Constituency abolished	
SNP	Angela Constance	Almond Valley	Constituency	2011	present	Serving	
Liberal Democrats	Alison McInnes	North East Scotland	Region	2007	2016	Defeated	
SNP	Christina McKelvie	Central Scotland	Region	2007	2011	Elected for constituency	
SNP	Christina McKelvie	Hamilton, Larkhall and Stonehouse	Constituency	2011	2025	Died	
Conservative	Liz Smith	Mid Scotland and Fife	Region	2007	2026	Retired	
SNP	Shirley-Anne Somerville	Lothians	Region	2007	2011	Defeated	
SNP	Shirley-Anne Somerville	Dunfermline	Constituency	2016	present	Serving	
SNP	Anne McLaughlin	Glasgow	Region	2009	2011	Defeated	
SNP	Clare Adamson	Central Scotland	Region	2011	2016	Elected for constituency	
SNP	Clare Adamson	Motherwell and Wishaw	Constituency	2016	present	Serving	
Labour Co-op	Claudia Beamish	South of Scotland	Region	2011	2021	Defeated	
SNP	Margaret Burgess	Cunninghame South	Constituency	2011	2016	Retired	
Conservative	Ruth Davidson	Glasgow	Region	2011	2016	Elected for constituency	
Conservative	Ruth Davidson	Edinburgh Central	Constituency	2016	2021	Retired	
Labour Co-op	Kezia Dugdale	Lothian	Region	2011	2019	Resigned	
SNP	Annabelle Ewing	Mid Scotland and Fife	Region	2011	2016	Elected for constituency	
SNP	Annabelle Ewing	Cowdenbeath	Constituency	2016	2026	Retired	
Labour	Mary Fee	West of Scotland	Region	2011	2021	Retired	
Green	Alison Johnstone	Lothian	Region	2011	2026	Retired	
Labour	Jenny Marra	North East Scotland	Region	2011	2021	Retired	
SNP	Joan McAlpine	South of Scotland	Region	2011	2021	Defeated	
Labour	Margaret McCulloch	Central Scotland	Region	2011	2016	Defeated	
Labour	Margaret McDougall	West of Scotland	Region	2011	2016	Retired	
SNP	Aileen McLeod	South Scotland	Region	2011	2016	Defeated	
Labour	Siobhan McMahon	Central Scotland	Region	2011	2016	Defeated	
Labour	Anne McTaggart	Glasgow	Region	2011	2016	Defeated	
SNP	Jean Urquhart	Highlands and Islands	Region	2011	2012	Resigned from the SNP	
Independent	Jean Urquhart	Highlands and Islands	Region	2012	2016	Defeated	
Labour	Jayne Baxter	Mid Scotland and Fife	Region	2012	2016	Retired	
Labour	Cara Hilton	Dunfermline	Constituency	2013	2016	Defeated	
Labour	Lesley Brennan	North East Scotland	Region	2016	2016	Defeated	
SNP	Ash Regan (Note: Ash Regan was known as Ash Denham from 2016 to 2020.)	Edinburgh Eastern	Constituency	2016	2023	Resigned from the SNP	
Alba	Ash Regan	Edinburgh Eastern	Constituency	2023	2025	Resigned from Alba	
Independent	Ash Regan	Edinburgh Eastern	Constituency	2025	2026	Defeated	
SNP	Mairi Evans	Angus North and Mearns	Constituency	2016	2026	Retired	
SNP	Kate Forbes	Skye, Lochaber and Badenoch	Constituency	2016	2026	Retired	
SNP	Jeane Freeman	Carrick, Cumnock and Doon Valley	Constituency	2016	2021	Retired	
SNP	Jenny Gilruth	Mid Fife and Glenrothes	Constituency	2016	present	Serving	
Conservative	Rachael Hamilton	South Scotland	Region	2016	2017	Resigned	
Conservative	Rachael Hamilton	Ettrick, Roxburgh and Berwickshire	Constituency	2017	present	Serving	
SNP	Emma Harper	South Scotland	Region	2016	2026	Defeated	
Conservative	Alison Harris	Central Scotland	Region	2016	2021	Retired	
SNP	Clare Haughey	Rutherglen	Constituency	2016	2026	Constituency abolished	
SNP	Clare Haughey	Rutherglen and Cambuslang	Constituency	2026	present	Serving	
Labour Co-op	Monica Lennon	Central Scotland	Region	2016	2026	Defeated	
Labour Co-op	Monica Lennon	Glasgow	Region	2026	present	Serving	
SNP	Rona Mackay	Strathkelvin and Bearsden	Constituency	2016	2026	Retired	
SNP	Ruth Maguire	Cunninghame South	Constituency	2016	2026	Retired	
SNP	Gillian Martin	Aberdeenshire East	Constituency	2016	present	Serving	
SNP	Gail Ross	Caithness, Sutherland and Ross	Constituency	2016	2021	Retired	
SNP	Maree Todd	Highlands and Islands	Region	2016	2021	Elected for constituency	
SNP	Maree Todd	Caithness, Sutherland and Ross	Constituency	2021	2026	Defeated	
SNP	Maree Todd	Highlands and Islands	Region	2026	present	Serving	
Conservative	Annie Wells	Glasgow	Region	2016	2026	Defeated	
Conservative	Michelle Ballantyne	South Scotland	Region	2017	2020	Resigned from Conservatives	
Independent	Michelle Ballantyne	South Scotland	Region	2020	2021	Joined Reform UK	
Reform	Michelle Ballantyne	South Scotland	Region	2021	2021	Defeated	
Liberal Democrats	Beatrice Wishart	Shetland	Constituency	2019	2026	Retired	
SNP	Karen Adam	Banffshire and Buchan Coast	Constituency	2021	present	Serving	
SNP	Siobhian Brown	Ayr	Constituency	2021	present	Serving	
Green	Ariane Burgess	Highlands and Islands	Region	2021	present	Serving	
SNP	Stephanie Callaghan	Uddingston and Bellshill	Constituency	2021	2026	Retired	
Green	Maggie Chapman	North East Scotland	Region	2021	present	Serving	
Labour	Katy Clark	West Scotland	Region	2021	present	Serving	
SNP	Natalie Don	Renfrewshire North and West	Constituency	2021	2026	Retired	
Conservative	Sharon Dowey	South Scotland	Region	2021	2026	Defeated	
SNP	Jackie Dunbar	Aberdeen Donside	Constituency	2021	present	Serving	
Labour	Pam Duncan-Glancy	Glasgow	Region	2021	2026	Suspended from Labour	
Independent	Pam Duncan-Glancy	Glasgow	Region	2026	2026	Retired	
Conservative	Meghan Gallacher	Central Scotland	Region	2021	2026	Region abolished	
Conservative	Meghan Gallacher	Central Scotland and Lothians West	Region	2026	present	Serving	
Conservative	Pam Gosal	West Scotland	Region	2021	2026	Defeated	
Green	Gillian Mackay	Central Scotland	Region	2021	2026	Region abolished	
Green	Gillian Mackay	Central Scotland and Lothians West	Region	2026	present	Serving	
SNP	Màiri McAllan	Clydesdale	Constituency	2021	present	Serving	
SNP	Marie McNair	Clydebank and Milngavie	Constituency	2021	present	Serving	
SNP	Jenni Minto	Argyll and Bute	Constituency	2021	present	Serving	
Labour	Carol Mochan	South Scotland	Region	2021	present	Serving	
SNP	Audrey Nicoll	Aberdeen South and North Kincardine	Constituency	2021	2026	Retired	
SNP	Emma Roddick	Highlands and Islands	Region	2021	2026	Elected for constituency	
SNP	Emma Roddick	Inverness and Nairn	Constituency	2026	present	Serving	
Green	Lorna Slater	Lothian	Region	2021	2026	Region abolished	
Green	Lorna Slater	Edinburgh Central	Constituency	2026	present	Serving	
SNP	Collette Stevenson	East Kilbride	Constituency	2021	present	Serving	
SNP	Kaukab Stewart	Glasgow Kelvin	Constituency	2021	2026	Defeated	
SNP	Michelle Thomson	Falkirk East	Constituency	2021	2026	Retired	
SNP	Evelyn Tweed	Stirling	Constituency	2021	2026	Retired	
Labour	Mercedes Villalba	North East Scotland	Region	2021	2026	Retired	
Conservative	Sue Webber	Lothian	Region	2021	2026	Defeated	
Conservative	Tess White	North East Scotland	Region	2021	2026	Retired	
SNP	Elena Whitham	Carrick, Cumnock and Doon Valley	Constituency	2021	2026	Retired	
Conservative	Roz McCall	Mid Scotland and Fife	Region	2022	2026	Defeated	
SNP	Heather Anderson	Dundee City West	Constituency	2026	present	Serving	
Reform	Senga Beresford	South Scotland	Region	2026	present	Serving	
SNP	Dawn Black	Angus North and Mearns	Constituency	2026	present	Serving	
Reform	Amanda Bland	Central Scotland and Lothians West	Region	2026	2026	Resigned from Reform	
Independent	Amanda Bland	Central Scotland and Lothians West	Region	2026	present	Serving	
Green	Holly Bruce	Glasgow Southside	Constituency	2026	present	Serving	
SNP	Kate Campbell	Edinburgh Eastern, Musselburgh and Tranent	Constituency	2026	present	Serving	
SNP	Michelle Campbell	Renfrewshire North and Cardonald	Constituency	2026	present	Serving	
Liberal Democrats	Yi-pei Chou Turvey	Central Scotland and Lothians West	Region	2026	present	Serving	
Liberal Democrats	Sanne Dijkstra-Downie	Edinburgh Northern	Constituency	2026	present	Serving	
Green	Iris Duane	Glasgow	Region	2026	present	Serving	
SNP	Patricia Gibson	Cunninghame South	Constituency	2026	present	Serving	
SNP	Hannah Mary Goodlad	Shetland Islands	Constituency	2026	present	Serving	
SNP	Katie Hagmann	Carrick, Cumnock and Doon Valley	Constituency	2026	present	Serving	
Green	Kayleigh Kinross-O'Neill	Edinburgh and Lothians East	Region	2026	present	Serving	
SNP	Simita Kumar	Edinburgh South Western	Constituency	2026	present	Serving	
Reform	Mandy Lindsay	Central Scotland and Lothians West	Region	2026	present	Serving	
Liberal Democrats	Morven-May MacCallum	Highlands and Islands	Region	2026	present	Serving	
Reform	Julie MacDougall	Mid Scotland and Fife	Region	2026	present	Serving	
Reform	Helen McDade	Mid Scotland and Fife	Region	2026	present	Serving	
Green	Cara McKee	West Scotland	Region	2026	present	Serving	
SNP	Laura Mitchell	Moray	Constituency	2026	present	Serving	
Green	Laura Moodie	South Scotland	Region	2026	present	Serving	
Green	Kate Nevens	Edinburgh and Lothians East	Region	2026	present	Serving	
SNP	Kirsten Oswald	Eastwood	Constituency	2026	present	Serving	
Reform	Angela Ross	Edinburgh and Lothians East	Region	2026	present	Serving	
Labour	Katherine Sangster	Edinburgh and Lothians East	Region	2026	present	Serving	
Reform	Kim Schmulian	Glasgow	Region	2026	present	Serving	
SNP	Pauline Stafford	Bathgate	Constituency	2026	present	Serving	
SNP	Alison Thewliss	Glasgow Central	Constituency	2026	present	Serving	
Labour	Jenny Young	Central Scotland and Lothians West	Region	2026	present	Serving	
