= Jamie Langan =

Member of the Scottish Parliament

Jamie Langan MSP
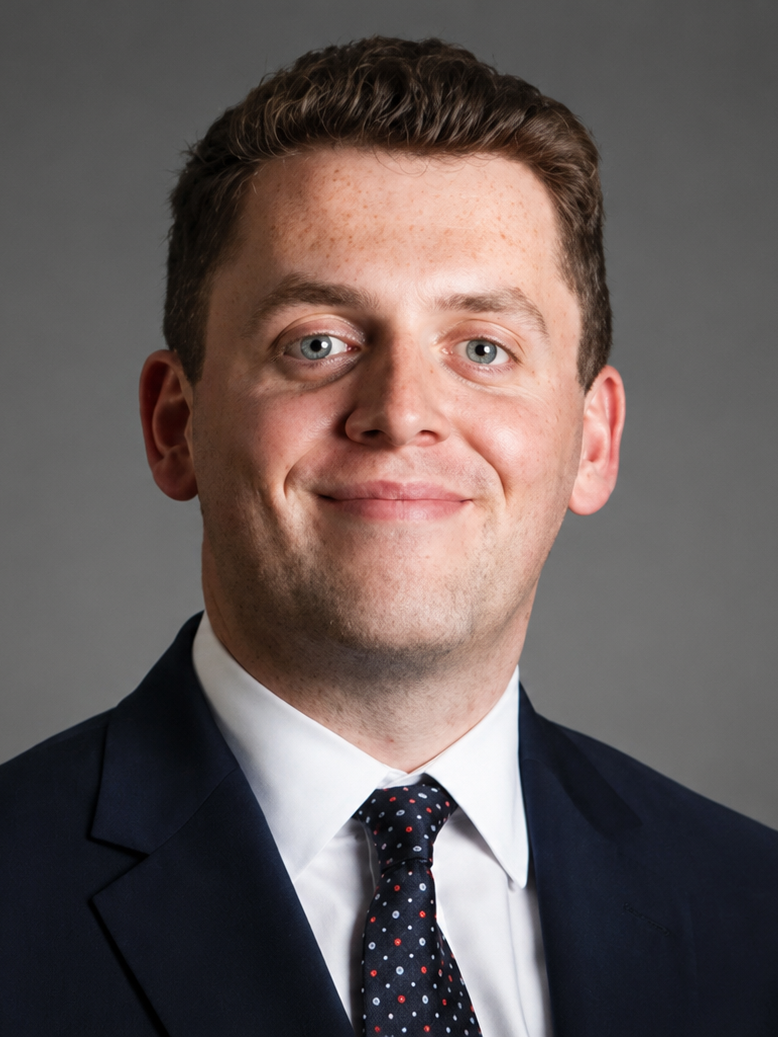
- Official portrait, 2026

Member of the Scottish Parliament for South Scotland (1 of 7 Regional MSPs)
- Incumbent
- Assumed office 7 May 2026

Reform Scotland Shadow portfolios
- 2026–present: Shadow Cabinet Secretary for Rural Affairs

Personal details
- Party: Reform

Jamie Alexander Langan is a Scottish politician who has served as a Member of the Scottish Parliament for South Scotland since May 2026. He is a member of Reform Party Scotland.

== Background ==
Langan lives in Edinburgh.

== Politics ==
Langan was announced as Reform UK's candidate for Ettrick, Roxburgh and Berwickshire and lead candidate for the South Scotland list in March 2026. He told ITV Border: "I freely admit I'm not local but it's a part of the world I've spent a lot of time in and really love."

Langan came third in Ettrick, Roxburgh & Berwickshire, behind Rachael Hamilton of the Scottish Conservatives and John Redpath of the SNP. He was elected as MSP for South Scotland, a position he currently holds.
