= Central Scotland and Lothians West =

Electoral region of the Scottish Parliament

- electoral region for the Scottish Parliament
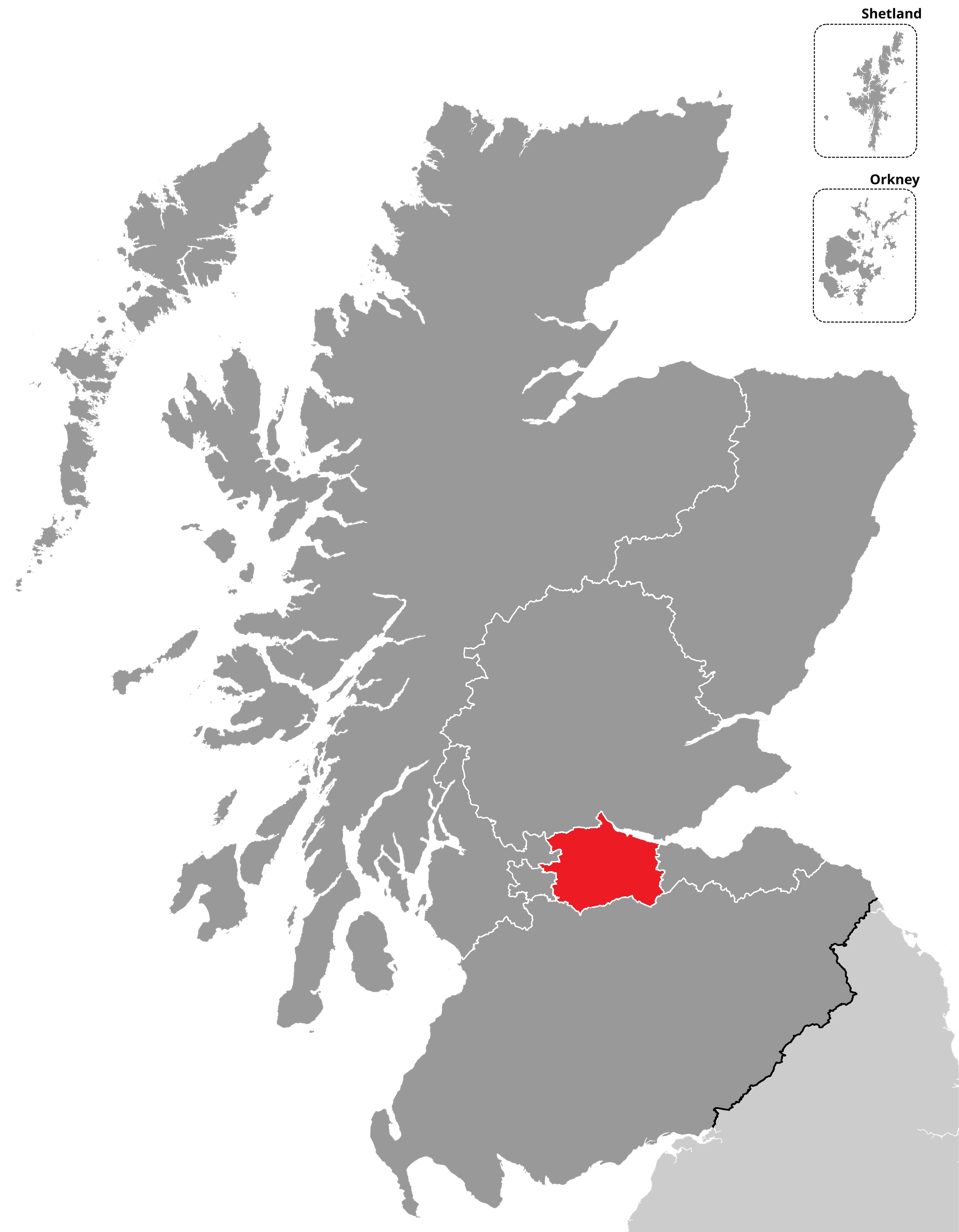
- Central Scotland and Lothians West shown within Scotland
- Council areas: Falkirk; North Lanarkshire; West Lothian; South Lanarkshire (part)
- Electorate: 550,717 (2022)

Current electoral region
- Created: 2026
- Constituencies: Airdrie; Almond Valley; Bathgate; Coatbridge and Chryston; Cumbernauld and Kilsyth; Falkirk East and Linlithgow; Falkirk West; Motherwell and Wishaw; Uddingston and Bellshill
- Created from: Central Scotland

Central Scotland and Lothians West is an electoral region of the Scottish Parliament. Under the additional-member electoral system used for elections to the Scottish Parliament, the region elects seven additional members, in addition to the nine constituency MSPs, to produce a form of proportional representation for the region as a whole.

The region was created by the Second Periodic Review of constituency and regional boundaries, the results of which were formally approved in October 2025. The new boundaries were first contested at the 2026 Scottish Parliament election.

== Boundaries ==
The region covers all of the Falkirk, North Lanarkshire and West Lothian council areas, and parts of the South Lanarkshire council area. It is similar to the former Central Scotland region, but now includes West Lothian instead of parts of South Lanarkshire that are now in the South Scotland region.

== Constituencies ==
The region contains nine constituencies.

Region	Constituencies from 2026
	1. Airdrie; 2. Almond Valley; 3. Bathgate; 4. Coatbridge and Chryston; 5. Cumbernauld and Kilsyth; 6. Falkirk East and Linlithgow; 7. Falkirk West; 8. Motherwell and Wishaw; 9. Uddingston and Bellshill

== Members of the Scottish Parliament ==
=== Constituency MSPs ===
Term	Election	Airdrie	Almond Valley	Bathgate	Coatbridge and Chryston	Cumbernauld and Kilsyth	Falkirk East and Linlithgow	Falkirk West	Motherwell and Wishaw	Uddingston and Bellshill
7th	2026	Neil Gray (SNP)	Angela Constance (SNP)	Pauline Stafford (SNP)	Fulton MacGregor (SNP)	Jamie Hepburn (SNP)	Martyn Day (SNP)	Gary Bouse (SNP)	Clare Adamson (SNP)	Steven Bonnar (SNP)

=== Regional list MSPs ===
N.B. This table is for presentation purposes only

Parliament	MSP	MSP	MSP	MSP	MSP	MSP	MSP
7th (2026–)	Graham Simpson (Reform)	Mandy Lindsay (Reform)	Amanda Bland (Independent) (Note: Bland was elected as an MSP for Reform UK but became an independent in October 2026.)	Mark Griffin (Labour)	Jenny Young (Labour)	Gillian Mackay (Green)	Meghan Gallacher (Conservative)

== Election results ==
=== 2026 Scottish Parliament election ===
==== Constituency results ====
2026 Scottish Parliament election: Central Scotland and Lothians West
Constituency	Elected member	Result
Airdrie	Neil Gray	SNP hold
Almond Valley	Angela Constance	SNP hold
Bathgate	Pauline Stafford	SNP hold
Coatbridge and Chryston	Fulton MacGregor	SNP hold
Cumbernauld and Kilsyth	Jamie Hepburn	SNP hold
Falkirk East and Linlithgow	Martyn Day	SNP hold
Falkirk West	Gary Bouse	SNP hold
Motherwell and Wishaw	Clare Adamson	SNP hold
Uddingston and Bellshill	Steven Bonnar	SNP hold

==== Additional Member results ====
2026 Scottish Parliament election: Central Scotland and Lothians West
List	Candidates	Votes	Of total (%)	± from prev.
SNP	Pauline Stafford, Neil Gray, Toni Giugliano, Clare Adamson, Callum Cox, Steven Bonnar, Stacey Devine	86,809	30.7	▼14.4
Reform	Graham Simpson, Mandy Lindsay, Amanda Bland, Richard Fairley, David McLennan, Duncan Macmillan, Stephen Grant, Malcolm Jones, George Hobbins	58,334	20.6	▲20.4
Labour	Mark Griffin, Jenny Young, Keiron Higgins, Siobhan Paterson, James McPhilemy, Suzanne MacLeod, Ayeshah Khan, Jordan Stokoe	57,103	20.2	▼2.6
Green	Gillian Mackay, Claire Williams, Cameron Glasgow, Anne McCrossan	34,415	12.2	▲5.9
Conservative	Meghan Gallacher, Lewis Stein, Neil Benny, Keith Allan, Andrew Bruce, Peter Heggie, Damian Doran-Timson, Bob Burgess, Euan Blockley	19,450	6.9	▼11.8
Liberal Democrats	Paul McGarry, Lucy Smith, Caron Lindsay, Stephen Harte, Brian Howieson, Daniel Mancini, Jenni Lang	12,830	4.5	▲2.4
Scottish Family	David Richardson, Leo Francis Lanahan, Norma McLachlan Diffin, Ailish Ann Lanahan	2,798	1.0	N/A
AtLS	Greig Duncan McArthur, Alan McManus, David Baird, Graham Fraser, Steve Arnott	2,692	1.0	N/A
Independent Green Voice	James Stewart	2,637	0.9	N/A
ISP	Julie Patricia McAnulty	1,803	0.6	N/A
Scottish Socialist	Collette Bradley, Lewis Clark, Conor Gilbey	1,202	0.4	N/A
Abolish the Scottish Parliament	John Jo Leckie	1,015	0.4	N/A
Workers Party	Abdul Dean	691	0.2	N/A
Advance UK	Mark Andrew Tunnicliff	494	0.2	N/A
Scottish Libertarian	Lukasz Furmaniak	285	0.1	N/A
UKIP	Neil Wilson, Stephen Paul Hollis, Margaret Garbutt	197	0.1	N/A

== See also ==
- List of Scottish Parliament constituencies and electoral regions (2026–)
