= Vic Currie =

Scottish politician

Vic Currie MSP
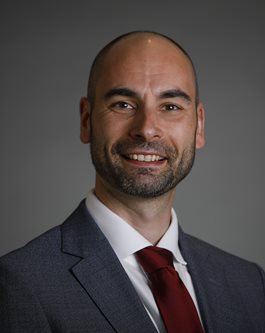
- Official portrait, 2026

Member of the Scottish Parliament for Highlands and Islands (1 of 7 Regional MSPs)
- Incumbent
- Assumed office 7 May 2026

Personal details
- Born: Edinburgh, Scotland
- Party: Reform Party Scotland

Victor Currie is a Scottish politician who has served as a Member of the Scottish Parliament for Highlands and Islands since May 2026. He is a member of Reform Party Scotland.

Currie is also a resident doctor and has served as a pilot in the Royal Navy.

He is mixed race as his mother is Indian.
