= David Smith (Scottish politician) =

Scottish politician

David Smith MSP
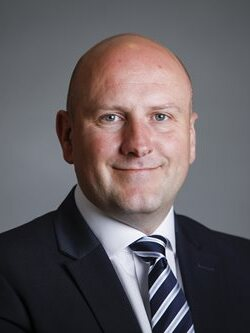
- Official Portrait, 2026

Member of the Scottish Parliament for West Scotland (1 of 7 Regional MSPs)
- Incumbent
- Assumed office 7 May 2026

Personal details
- Party: Reform UK

David Smith is a Scottish politician who has served as a Member of the Scottish Parliament for West Scotland since May 2026. He is a member of Reform UK.

== Personal life ==
Smith was born and raised in the South Wales Valleys. He first came to the Dumbarton area in 2002 when he was drafted to Faslane Naval Base, and subsequently settled in the area, living at various times in Balloch, Helensburgh, the Vale of Leven and Dumbarton. He has a large family, with children ranging from high school and college to university age. His son is disabled, and Smith and his partner also became kinship carers after taking in a family friend to prevent her entering the care system.

== Career ==
=== Royal Navy ===
Smith served in the Royal Navy Submarine Service for nearly fourteen years, joining as a young man and being drafted initially to Faslane Naval Base in 2002. He left the service in 2013 holding the rank of Chief Petty Officer, with his final role as a Nuclear Reactor Operator within the Marine Engineering Branch.

=== Engineering consultancy ===
Following his naval career, Smith worked in engineering consultancy, supporting major projects including Royal Navy aircraft carriers, submarine disposal, Sellafield nuclear waste management, ScotRail overhaul and repair, and broader Ministry of Defence engineering support. He also served as the unpaid carers' representative on the West Dunbartonshire Health and Social Care Board, a role he took on as a result of his experience as a kinship carer and as the parent of a disabled son.

== Political career ==
=== Reform UK ===
Smith joined Reform UK and was attracted to the party's positions on defence, taxation and fairness. He served as branch chairman for Dunbartonshire.

=== 2024 UK general election ===
Smith stood as the Reform UK candidate for West Dunbartonshire at the 2024 United Kingdom general election, finishing third with 2,770 votes (7.0%). The seat was won by Douglas McAllister of Labour.

=== 2024 local by-elections ===
In November 2024 Smith stood as the Reform UK candidate in the Kilpatrick ward by-election in West Dunbartonshire. In May 2025 he stood in the Clydebank Waterfront ward by-election, where Reform finished second ahead of Labour.

=== 2026 Scottish Parliament election ===
For the 2026 Scottish Parliament election, Smith was placed second on the Reform UK West Scotland regional list, behind party leader Malcolm Offord. He also stood in the Dumbarton constituency, where he polled 5,040 votes (15.7%), finishing third behind Jackie Baillie of Labour and the SNP's Sophie Traynor.

The full result for Dumbarton was:

Candidate	Party	Votes
Jackie Baillie	Scottish Labour Party	12,747
Sophie Traynor	Scottish National Party	10,961
David Smith	Reform UK	5,040
Gary Mulvaney	Scottish Conservative and Unionist Party	1,368
Elaine Ford	Scottish Liberal Democrats	1,196
Lynda Hannah McEwan	TUSC	356
Andrew Joseph Muir	Independent	355
Turnout		57.01%

On 8 May 2026, Smith was elected as a regional list MSP for West Scotland alongside Malcolm Offord, as one of two Reform UK representatives for the region. It was his first elected office.

He was elected on the regional list for West Scotland in the 2026 Scottish Parliament election. He stood in West Dunbartonshire in 2024.
