= Kenneth Gibson (Scottish politician) =

Scottish politician (born 1961)

Kenneth Gibson MSP
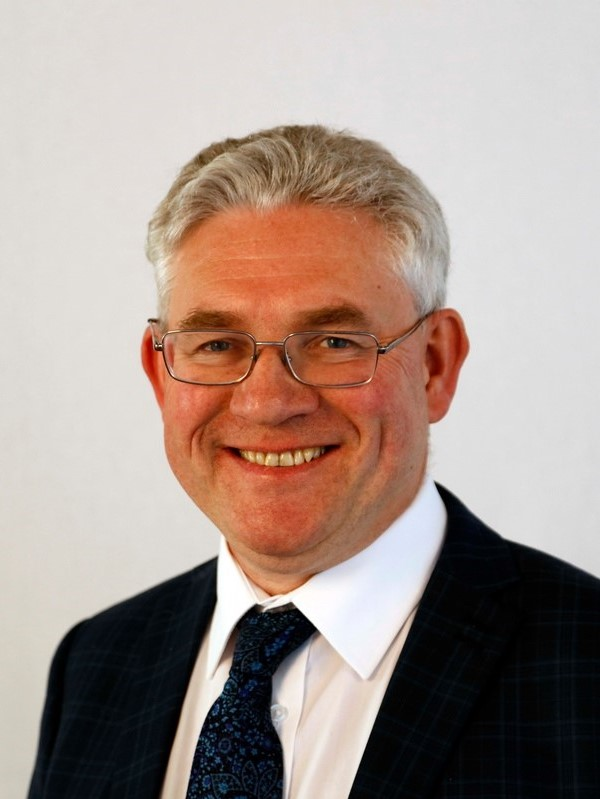
- Official portrait, 2021

Presiding Officer of the Scottish Parliament
- Incumbent
- Assumed office 14 May 2026
- Monarch: Charles III
- Deputy: Clare Adamson; Katy Clark
- Preceded by: Alison Johnstone

Convener of the Finance and Public Administration Committee (Note: Finance Committee (2011–16))
- In office 22 June 2021 – 8 April 2026
- Preceded by: Bruce Crawford
- In office 15 June 2011 – 23 March 2016
- Preceded by: Andrew Welsh
- Succeeded by: Bruce Crawford

Member of Scottish Parliament
- Incumbent
- Assumed office 3 May 2007
- Preceded by: Allan Wilson
- Constituency: Cunninghame North
- Majority: 5,792 (19.2%)
- In office 6 May 1999 – 31 March 2003
- Constituency: Glasgow

Personal details
- Born: 8 September 1961 (age 65) Paisley, Scotland
- Party: Independent (since 2026)
- Other political affiliations: Scottish National Party (until 2026)
- Spouse: Patricia Gibson MSP
- Education: University of Stirling

Kenneth James Gibson (born 8 September 1961) is a Scottish politician who has served as the Presiding Officer of the Scottish Parliament since May 2026. A former member of the Scottish National Party (SNP), he resigned his party affiliation upon becoming Presiding Officer. He has been the Member of the Scottish Parliament (MSP) for Cunninghame North since 2007, having previously represented the Glasgow region between 1999 and 2003.

Gibson was born in Paisley and has a BA in Economics from the University of Stirling. He served as an SNP councillor in Glasgow from 1992 to 1999, when he was elected to the new Scottish Parliament. In the 2003 election, Gibson lost his seat as a list member for the Glasgow region. He was narrowly elected as MSP for the Cunninghame North constituency in 2007 and has represented the area since. He is one of only four current MSPs who were originally elected to Holyrood in its inaugural election.

As an SNP backbencher, Gibson twice convened the Parliament's Finance Committee (2011–2016 and 2021–2026). In this role, he was praised for a willingness to challenge his own government. Gibson also rebelled against his party over a second Brexit referendum and the introduction of gender recognition reforms, while voting in favour of legislation to criminalise the purchase of sex that the Scottish Government opposed.

In 2026, he was elected by a majority of MSPs to become Presiding Officer of the Scottish Parliament for its seventh session. Gibson pledged to be a reforming presiding officer and said that his accession to the role meant that the "era of a dull Parliament is at an end". Following his election, he immediately introduced a series of changes to the operation of parliamentary business including splitting First Minister's Questions into two sessions, one for party leaders and one for backbenchers, and automatically protecting the time of all speakers who take interventions in debates.

== Early life ==
Gibson was born in Paisley in 1961. He attended Bellahouston Academy in Glasgow and then studied economics at the University of Stirling. He joined the SNP on his first day of university.

Between 1982 and 1986, Gibson worked as a systems development officer for British Steel. He then worked on the 1988 Glasgow Garden Festival. Following this, he was employed in the pharmaceutical sector, as a sales representative and trainer, between 1988 and his election to the Scottish Parliament in 1999.

Gibson was involved with the SNP throughout the 1980s and 1990s. In 1987, he stood for the party in the Monklands East constituency against Labour MP and future leader John Smith. He finished third with 12.9% of the vote.

Additionally, Gibson was as an SNP councillor in Glasgow for Mosspark from 1992 to 1999, becoming the first party representative in the city to serve successive terms. Following the defection of three Labour councillors and a by-election win, Gibson became Leader of the Opposition on Glasgow City Council from January 1998. In the Glasgow City Council election of 1999, his mother Iris replaced him as the councillor for Mosspark.

== SNP Member of the Scottish Parliament (1999–2003, 2007–2026) ==
=== Glasgow ===
Gibson was first elected to the Scottish Parliament at the 1999 election as a list member for the Glasgow region. In the election, he stood for the Glasgow Pollok constituency where he secured 25.9% of the vote and came second to Labour's Johann Lamont.

During this session, he was the first MSP to lodge plans for a ban of smoking in public places. His proposed Regulation of Smoking Bill was not passed during the session and Gibson lost his seat in the 2003 Scottish Parliament election.

In 2004, he stood unsuccessfully for election to the European Parliament. While he was ranked third on the SNP list, the party saw only 2 MEPs elected.

=== Cunninghame North ===
In 2007, he was chosen to contest the constituency of Cunninghame North and gained the seat from Scottish Labour by 48 votes, the smallest margin in Scotland. This meant that he defeated both Labour Minister Allan Wilson and former SNP MSP Campbell Martin, who secured 14.6% of the vote as an independent candidate. Labour contemplated a legal challenge over the results after over 1,000 votes had been rejected in the constituency, but ultimately decided against this. The high number of spoiled ballots formed part of the 140,000 votes which had been rejected across Scotland as a whole, after council elections, using single transferable vote, were conducted on the same day as the Scottish Parliament election.

In the 2011 election, Gibson secured a comfortable majority of 6,117 and again defeated Wilson. As part of a free vote, Gibson voted in favour of introducing same-sex marriage in Scotland in 2014.

Gibson was again re-elected to represent the Cunninghame North constituency in the 2016 election. In March 2017, Holyrood's Standards Committee admonished Gibson for failure to make an oral declaration of a registered financial interest. The Commissioner for Ethical Standards in Public Life in Scotland submitted a report to the Procurator Fiscal. The alleged offence was time barred from criminal proceedings. Political opponents called for his suspension from the SNP.

Gibson faced Osama Saeed and former MP Corri Wilson in a selection challenge for the SNP nomination to contest Cunninghame North at the 2021 Scottish Parliament elections. Individual office-bearers in the Cunninghame North Constituency Association had issued a call for members to come forward to challenge Gibson, and all sitting SNP MSPs, saying there should be "a festival of democracy". On 14 October 2020, it was reported that two local SNP officials had resigned over allegations that Gibson had been "aggressive and abrasive." Gibson suggested he was the target of a smear campaign and “underhand tactics”. In December, he emerged as the winner of the selection contest.

In 2021, Gibson was re-elected in Cunninghame North and defeated Scottish Conservative MSP Jamie Greene (who himself was re-elected on the West of Scotland regional list). During this session, he voted in favour of the, ultimately unsuccessful, Assisted Dying for Terminally Ill Adults (Scotland) Bill at stages one and three. The Bill aimed to introduce assisted dying to Scotland.

=== Convener roles (2011–2026) ===
Gibson served as the Convener of the Finance Committee in the Scottish Parliament from 2011 to 2016 and brought attention to enhanced financial powers in the Scotland Act 2012. Additionally, in 2016 he suggested that the current structure of Scotland’s local government and health boards was "neither sustainable nor desirable" and needed to be re-examined. Gibson was due to give a speech on the topic at the 2016 SNP conference, which was cut due to time constraints. During the sixth session of the parliament, Gibson served as convener of the Finance and Public Administration Committee. Gibson was praised for his performance in this role by MSPs from across the parliament, particularly due to his willingness to scrutinise and criticise his own party (who formed the Scottish Government). He has said that as a committee convenor "you cannot be on the side of the government, nor can you be someone who is there to simply attack the government, you have to look at the positives and the negatives".

In 2022, the committee criticised the lack of information available on possible costs associated with the Government's proposed National Care Service. Gibson later said that the committee were "becoming increasingly concerned at the lack of information available on the financial implications of the bill". In 2025, the Government scrapped their proposals. Under Gibson's convenorship, the committee also conducted an inquiry into the commissioners responsible to the Scottish Parliament. This came about after it was reported that the seven existing commissioners cost £16.6 million between 2023 and 2024. In their final report, the committee were critical of the existing system and recommended a new parliamentary committee be formed to investigate its operation, while also calling for "a moratorium on creating any new SPCB [Scottish Parliamentary Corporate Body] supported bodies, or expanding the remit of existing bodies, until a ‘root and branch’ review of the structure is carried out". This led to the formation of the SPCB Supported Bodies Landscape Review Committee which concluded that new commissioners should not be introduced unless as an effective "last resort".

The committee published a report in 2025 suggesting that reform was needed to the way public inquiries operated in Scotland to reduce their timescales and costs. Gibson claimed that the inquiries use "public money... that's not going into other public services if it's going into inquiries and the cost of those has increased by £30m this year alone, so that's something we really need to take cognisance of."

=== Rebellions ===
Gibson engaged in a number of rebellions while serving as an SNP MSP.

In 2018, Gibson voted against an amendment proposing a second EU referendum. He explained this decision, stating that "although I voted to remain, in my view a referendum should be binding for a generation unless there is a material change in circumstances... I also believe that having a second vote on the Brexit package, sets a precedent. One I would not want to see imposed post indyref2."

Along with eight other SNP MSPs, Gibson voted against the Gender Recognition Reform (Scotland) Bill, which sought to make it easier for people to change their legal gender. During the Stage 3 debate on the bill, in December 2022, Gibson, on the topic of housing "anatomical males" in women's prisons, stated "If a fox said it was a chicken, would you put it in a henhouse? Of course not." This was said to be "bordering on hate speech" by Scottish Labour MSP Mercedes Villalba.

Gibson was also critical of the SNP's cooperation agreement with the Scottish Greens in the sixth session of the parliament more widely, saying that the SNP had "come out of it worse".

In 2026, Gibson voted in favour of former SNP MSP Ash Regan's Prostitution (Offences and Support) (Scotland) Bill. The Bill sought to introduce the "Nordic model" approach to prostitution to Scotland, where the purchase of sex would be criminalised and the convictions of those previously charged with solicitation repealed. The Scottish Government opposed the Bill, and Gibson was one of six SNP MSPs to vote in favour of it at stage one.

== Presiding Officer of the Scottish Parliament (2026–present) ==
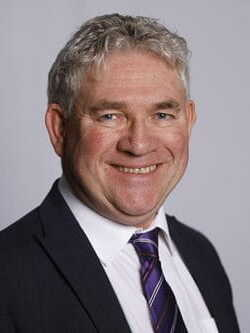
Official portrait, 2026

=== Election ===
In April 2026, alongside Scottish Conservative MSP Stephen Kerr and Scottish Labour MSP Paul Sweeney, Gibson wrote in The Scotsman criticising the election process for the Presiding Officer (the individual who chairs the Parliament). In the article they argued that the person chosen to become Presiding Officer was often agreed on by party managers prior to their election. They claimed that "the election of the Presiding Officer is not a genuine contest. It is, more often than not, settled in advance." They also suggested that a campaign period was needed to allow for the candidates to set out how they would perform in the role. Following his successful re-election as MSP for Cunninghame North in the 2026 Scottish Parliament election, Gibson announced he would run for the role himself.

In the days before the vote, Stephen Kerr hosted a hustings attended by Gibson and fellow candidates Liam McArthur (Scottish Liberal Democrat) and Stuart McMillan (SNP). At the event, Gibson claimed that the chamber had become "dull" and believed that MSPs should be given more time to accept interventions in debates, for example. This was reportedly the first time that a hustings had taken place prior to the Presiding Officer's election. The hustings was not attended by the other candidate for the role Clare Haughey (SNP), who was reported to be the SNP Government's preferred choice.

The election took place on 14 May 2026. McMillan was eliminated in the first round and McArthur was eliminated in the second round. In the final secret ballot, Gibson received 74 votes to Haughey's 54 votes - with one abstention. Upon his election, Gibson said that the "era of a dull Parliament is at an end" and that he believed the result of the vote would have been "unexpected" for the Scottish Government. His reported agenda included aims to: boost the role of backbenchers in the parliament; give extra support to MSPs seeking to introduce their own legislation; and, as the "insurgent's candidate", to enact "a permanent revolution... looking for continuous change, continuous innovation, continuous challenge". Gibson also clarified post-election that he would act on instances of deliberate misgendering in the chamber and had discussed this with the Scottish Green group, which included the parliament's only openly transgender MSPs, prior to the vote.

=== Parliamentary reforms ===
On 21 May 2026, Gibson announced a series of changes to the way that Chamber business would function. He said that he had been elected on "a mandate to shake up how we do things" and that "the status quo is not an option and I’m keen to push at the boundaries of what’s possible within my remit". As part of these reforms he announced that First Minister's Questions (FMQs) would change from a 45 minute slot on Thursdays to two 30 minute slots, one for backbench MSPs on Tuesdays and one for party leaders on Thursdays. Other measures introduced included: ensuring speakers get the time back for all interventions accepted in speeches; increasing the number of general and portfolio questions from 32 to 38 per week; reducing the number of parties required to back a successful Member's Business Motion from three to two; moving decision time (where MSPs vote on the business of the day) from 17:00 to 17:30 on Tuesdays and Wednesdays; and scrapping the advanced publication of some questions before FMQs.

=== Bullying allegations ===
On 6 November 2026, the Sunday Mail published a dossier of complaints about Kenneth Gibson's conduct, revealing that Gibson had been the subject of over a dozen bullying complaints from constituency staff and party activists that ranged from 2000 to 2020, accusing him of toxic, aggressive, entitled, and misogynistic behaviour. A further nineteen members, activists, and councillors signed a letter of complaint in June 2019. A dossier of complaints was assembled by independent solicitors and was passed to the SNP in 2020. The SNP did not respond to the complaints at the time, and in response to the Sunday Mail's allegations in 2026, said that there had been "insufficient evidence of any wrongdoing" by Gibson.

On 15 November 2026, the Sunday Mail published further allegations against Gibson, with complainants accusing the SNP of failing to properly investigate according to the party's internal procedures. Dorothy-Grace Elder, who had served as an MSP from 1999 to 2003, claimed that she had witnessed numerous examples of bullying and aggressive behaviour from Gibson, and had contacted Glasgow Women's Aid after disabled SNP activist Gill Strachan accused him of attacking her while on a boat trip on Loch Ness in 2000. Elder resigned from the SNP in 2002 after being told that she would face discipline for seeking advice from a women's group on male bullying in politics. Numerous other SNP figures, including former party officials Dr Malcolm Kerr and Susan Knox, and former parliamentary candidate Osama Bhutta, accused Gibson of unacceptable behaviour, and the SNP of failing to properly investigate. The SNP maintained that the complaints were dealt with in line with the party's internal processes and that there were no grounds for action.

== Personal life ==
Gibson is married to fellow parliamentarian Patricia Gibson, who was previously SNP MP for North Ayrshire and Arran (2015–2024) and was elected in 2026 to serve as the SNP MSP for Cunninghame South. In 2016, he spoke in Holyrood about losing his child in 2009 towards the end of his wife's pregnancy. In April 2023, his son passed away and in a 2024 interview he stated: "I have lost two sons, in 2009 and 2023. It’s hard. But I am resilient. Resilience is important in life, otherwise it can overwhelm you. But don’t get me wrong, they were very bleak moments".

He is one of only four MSPs still serving in the Scottish Parliament who were first elected in its inaugural 1999 election. The others being: Jackie Baillie, Pauline McNeill, and John Swinney.

His favourite TV programme is the original Star Trek series. He supports St Mirren F.C.

== Notes ==
Scottish Parliament
Preceded by Allan Wilson	Member of the Scottish Parliament for Cunninghame North; 2007–present	Incumbent
