= Mandy Lindsay (Scottish politician) =

Scottish politician

Amanda Lindsay MSP
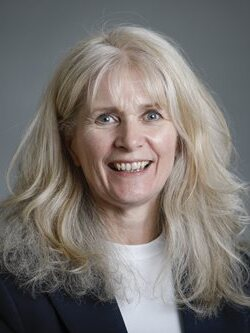
- Official Portrait, 2026

Member of the Scottish Parliament for Central Scotland and Lothians West (1 of 7 Regional MSPs)
- Incumbent
- Assumed office 7 May 2026

Reform Scotland Shadow portfolios
- 2026–present: Shadow Cabinet Secretary for Education, Women and Girls

Personal details
- Party: Reform Party Scotland

Amanda "Mandy" Lindsay is a Scottish politician who has served as a Member of the Scottish Parliament for Central Scotland and Lothians West since May 2026. She is a member of Reform Party Scotland.
