= Joe Long (politician) =

Scottish politician

Joe Long MSP
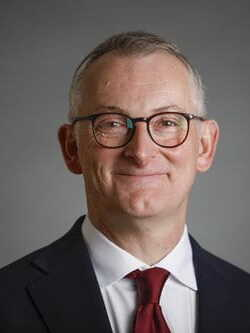
- Official Portrait, 2026

Member of the Scottish Parliament for Mid Scotland and Fife (1 of 7 Regional MSPs)
- Incumbent
- Assumed office 7 May 2026

Personal details
- Party: Scottish Labour

Joe Long is a Scottish Labour and Co-operative Party politician who has served as a Member of the Scottish Parliament (MSP) for the Mid Scotland and Fife region since 2026.

== Biography ==
Long previously worked in frontline health and social care services, academia, and in leadership roles in the third sector. He holds a PhD in Social anthropology from the University of Aberdeen, where his research focused on indigenous Buryat communities of Southern Siberia. He subsequently held research and teaching posts in Germany and later published his Siberian ethnography as a book. Having worked in social care for several years, Long went on to establish a research programme at the charity Scottish Autism. He later served as the organisation's Director of Practice and Innovation, leading the Centre for Practice, Policy and Research.

Long has been active in the Labour Party in Dunfermline and across Fife for a number of years. In November 2015 he stood as the Labour candidate in the Dunfermline North by-election for Fife Council, in which he lost to the SNP candidate, Ian Ferguson .

In October 2025, Long was selected as the Scottish Labour candidate for the Dunfermline constituency at the 2026 Scottish Parliament election, and was placed second on the party's regional list for Mid Scotland and Fife.

At the election on 8 May 2026, Long received 8,769 votes (25.70%) in the Dunfermline constituency, placing second behind the incumbent SNP MSP Shirley-Anne Somerville, who received 14,206 votes (41.63%). He was subsequently elected as a regional list MSP for Mid Scotland and Fife.

In May 2026 Long was named as Scottish Labour's Shadow Minister for Community Care and Mental Wellbeing. He serves on the Scottish Parliament's Committee for Health, Care and Sport.
