= Kim Schmulian =

Scottish politician

Kim Schmulian MSP
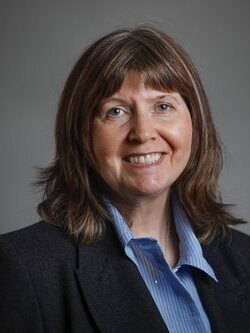
- Official Portrait, 2026

Member of the Scottish Parliament for Glasgow (1 of 7 Regional MSPs)
- Incumbent
- Assumed office 7 May 2026

Reform Scotland Shadow portfolios
- 2026–present: Shadow Cabinet Secretary for Finance

Personal details
- Party: Reform Party Scotland (2026 - present)
- Other political affiliations: Scottish Conservatives (before 2026)

Kim Schmulian is a Scottish Reform UK politician who has been a Member of the Scottish Parliament (MSP) for the Glasgow region since May 2026.

== Biography ==
Schmulian has training in conflict management. She is a solicitor by profession. Schmulian was the candidate for the Scottish Conservatives in the 2022 Glasgow City Council election for the Newlands/Auldburn ward, losing on the 9th count.

She later defected to Reform UK and was a Reform candidate in the 2026 Scottish Parliament election. She came third in the election for the Glasgow Cathcart and Pollok constituency with 5,320 votes, and being elected on the Glasgow regional list.
