= Helen McDade =

Scottish politician

Helen McDade MSP
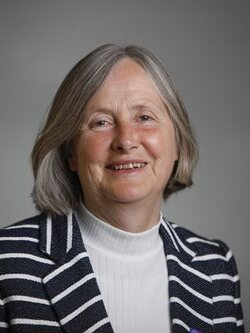
- Official Portrait, 2026

Convener of the Health, Care and Sport Committee
- Incumbent
- Assumed office 10 June 2026
- Preceded by: Clare Haughey

Member of the Scottish Parliament for Mid Scotland and Fife (1 of 7 Regional MSPs)
- Incumbent
- Assumed office 7 May 2026

Reform Scotland Shadow portfolios
- 2026–present: Shadow Cabinet Secretary for Health

Personal details
- Party: Reform Party Scotland

Helen McDade is a Scottish politician who has served as a Member of the Scottish Parliament for Mid Scotland and Fife since May 2026, and is the current convener of the Health, Care and Sport Committee. She is a member of Reform Party Scotland.

== Biography ==
Helen McDade has worked at environmental charities. In the 2026 Scottish Parliament election, McDade stood as Reform's constituency candidate in Perthshire South and Kinross-shire, where she placed third. She was elected as a list MSP for the Mid Scotland and Fife region. She previously stood for Perth and Kinross-shire in the 2024 United Kingdom general election.

== Personal ==
Helen McDade is the mother of Xander McDade, incumbent Provost of Perth and Kinross Council.
