= Amanda Bland =

Scottish politician

Amanda Bland MSP
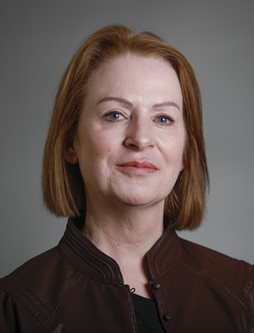
- Official portrait, 2026

Member of the Scottish Parliament for Central Scotland and Lothians West (1 of 7 Regional MSPs)
- Incumbent
- Assumed office 7 May 2026

Reform Scotland Shadow portfolios
- 2026: Shadow Cabinet Secretary for Justice

Personal details
- Party: Independent (2026–present)
- Other political affiliations: Reform UK Scotland (until 2026)

Amanda Bland is an independent Scottish politician who has served as a Member of the Scottish Parliament for Central Scotland and Lothians West since May 2026. She was previously a member of Reform UK, before resigning from the party in October 2026.

== Early life ==
Bland lived in Glasgow as a child, where she grew up with an abusive father.

She later worked as a police officer and specialised in child protection, stating in an interview that: "once I got into the police, I thought, I need to protect children. My whole life became that."

Bland is also a qualified primary school teacher.

== Political career ==
Bland was elected as an MSP in the 2026 Scottish Parliament election, for the Central Scotland and Lothians West region. She had also stood in the Falkirk East and Linlithgow constituency, where she came third with 7,906 votes (21% of all votes cast).

Following her election, Bland was appointed as Reform's Shadow Cabinet Secretary for Justice.

On 19 October 2026, Bland resigned from Reform stating that her values had not changed but that she believed she could best achieve her political goals as an independent MSP. She also suggested that she would continue to serve on the Criminal Justice Committee. As Scottish Labour had tied with Reform in terms of seats won during the 2026 election, this meant that Reform became the third largest party in the Parliament. Consequently, the party called on Bland to resign from the Parliament so that a new Reform MSP could take her place as a regional member. The party also claimed that Bland was due to meet with Reform Whip Max Bannerman over issues relating to parliamentary staff who had recently left her office, and that this was linked to her decision to quit the party.

After departing from Reform, Bland claimed that her treatment by the party and those in senior leadership positions made her feel as if she was "in a coercive relationship", reminding her of the abuse that she had witnessed in her childhood. She also suggested that there was a culture of misogyny within the party.

== Personal life ==
Bland has two sons and a husband. She lives in the Falkirk area.
