= Cara McKee =

Scottish politician and poet

Cara McKee MSP
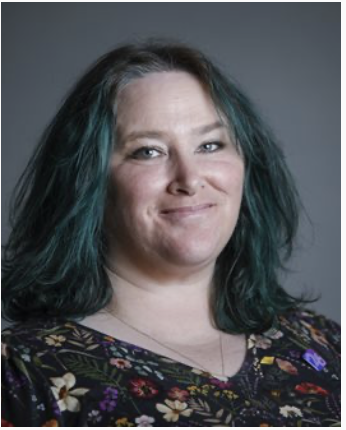

Member of the Scottish Parliament for West Scotland (1 of 7 Regional MSPs)
- Incumbent
- Assumed office 7 May 2026

Personal details
- Party: Scottish Greens

Cara McKee is a Scottish politician, poet and librarian who has served as a Member of the Scottish Parliament for West Scotland since May 2026. She is a member of the Scottish Greens.

== Personal life ==
McKee grew up in Ilkley, West Yorkshire, England. She moved to Scotland in 2003 and has lived in North Ayrshire, on the west coast of Scotland, where she is a mother of three.

== Career ==
=== Government research ===
On moving to Scotland, McKee worked as a social researcher for the Scottish Government.

=== Library work ===
McKee subsequently worked as a village librarian in Skelmorlie, North Ayrshire. She was also a columnist for the Ayrshire Weekly Press.

=== Poetry ===
McKee is a published poet, writing as Cara L McKee. Her debut pamphlet First Kiss was published by Maytree Press in May 2020, featuring poems of love, loss and coming of age. Her second pamphlet, Little Gods, was published by Roswell Publishing in autumn 2023. Her poems have appeared in numerous literary publications including Gutter, Brittle Star, Ink, Sweat and Tears, The Interpreter's House, Under the Radar, Flights and Obsessed with Pipework.

== Political career ==
=== Party activism ===
McKee served as co-convenor of the Ayrshire Greens. She supported the Better Buses campaign for publicly owned bus services across Glasgow and West Scotland, and was a vocal advocate for action on Ardrossan Harbour, which had been subject to a long-running dispute about its management by Peel Ports.

=== 2024 UK general election ===
McKee stood as the Scottish Green Party candidate for North Ayrshire and Arran at the 2024 United Kingdom general election, finishing fifth with 1,327 votes (3.14%). The seat was won by Labour's Irene Campbell.

=== 2026 Scottish Parliament election ===
In July 2025, the Scottish Greens announced McKee as the second candidate on their West Scotland regional list for the 2026 Scottish Parliament election, behind incumbent MSP and co-leader Ross Greer. During the internal party selection process McKee had challenged Greer for the top list position, standing as part of a grassroots socialist slate of candidates.

McKee's campaign priorities included tackling poverty and low wages, expanding publicly owned bus services, integrated ticketing across public transport, and action on Ardrossan Harbour.

On 8 May 2026, McKee was elected as a regional MSP for West Scotland, alongside Ross Greer, as one of two Scottish Greens representatives for the region. It was her first elected office.

== Publications ==
=== Poetry pamphlets ===
- First Kiss, Maytree Press, 2020 (ISBN 9781913508050)
- Little Gods, Roswell Publishing, 2023

== Biography ==
She is a former Ayrshire Weekly Press columnist. She was a candidate on the regional list for West Scotland in the 2026 Scottish Parliament election. Prior to becoming an MSP she ran the Skelmorlie library. The co-convener of the Ayshire greens, she was elected as a list MSP in 2026. She stood in North Ayrshire and Arran in 2024.
