= Jenny Young (politician) =

Scottish politician

Jenny Young MSP
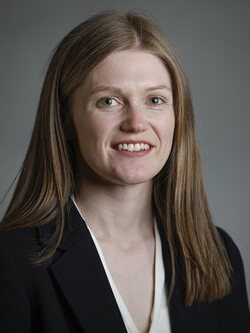
- Official Portrait, 2026

Member of the Scottish Parliament for Central Scotland and Lothians West (1 of 7 Regional MSPs)
- Incumbent
- Assumed office 7 May 2026

Personal details
- Party: Scottish Labour

Jenny Young is a Scottish politician who has served as a Member of the Scottish Parliament for Central Scotland and Lothians West since May 2026. She is a member of Scottish Labour.

== Personal life ==
Young is from Linlithgow, West Lothian. She read Modern and Medieval Languages (French and Spanish) at the University of Cambridge from 2013 to 2017.

== Career ==
=== Teaching ===
Young worked as a teacher of French and Spanish in West Lothian Council secondary schools from 2018 to 2023.

=== Parliamentary research ===
From 2023, Young worked as a researcher in the Scottish Parliament office of Michael Marra MSP, Labour MSP for North East Scotland and the party's Shadow Cabinet Secretary for Finance.

== Political career ==
=== Candidate selection ===
In February 2026, Young was confirmed as the Scottish Labour candidate for the newly created Bathgate constituency in West Lothian, and was ranked second on the party's Central Scotland and Lothians West regional list, behind Mark Griffin MSP. The rankings followed an internal ballot of Scottish Labour members from across the newly formed region.

=== MSP for Central Scotland and Lothians West ===
Young stood as the Labour candidate for the Bathgate constituency at the 2026 Scottish Parliament election, finishing second with 8,007 votes behind SNP winner Pauline Stafford who polled 13,594. The full constituency result was:

Candidate	Party	Votes
Pauline Stafford	Scottish National Party	13,594
Jenny Young	Scottish Labour Party	8,007
David McLennan	Reform UK	7,511
Peter Heggie	Scottish Conservative and Unionist Party	2,091
Stephen Harte	Scottish Liberal Democrats	1,937
Gus Ferguson	British Unionist Party	227
Turnout		49.1%

Young was subsequently elected as a regional list MSP for Central Scotland and Lothians West, one of two Scottish Labour representatives for the region alongside Mark Griffin. It was her first elected office. On 26 May 2026, she was assigned responsibility for innovation, technology and tertiary education in the shadow cabinet of Anas Sarwar.

She made her maiden speech in the Holyrood Parliament on 4 June 2026 on the subject of children's education.
