= Clare Adamson =

Scottish politician (born 1967)

Clare Adamson FBCS MSP
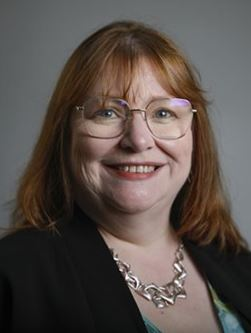
- Official portrait, 2026

Deputy Presiding Officer of the Scottish Parliament
- Incumbent
- Assumed office 14 May 2026 Serving with Katy Clark
- Presiding Officer: Kenneth Gibson
- Preceded by: Annabelle Ewing

Member of the Scottish Parliament for Motherwell and Wishaw
- Incumbent
- Assumed office 5 May 2016
- Preceded by: John Pentland
- Majority: 5,515 (20.1%)

Member of the Scottish Parliament for Central Scotland (1 of 7 Regional MSPs)
- In office 5 May 2011 – 24 March 2016

Personal details
- Born: Clare Anne Pickering; 1 August 1967 (age 59) Motherwell, North Lanarkshire, Scotland
- Party: Scottish National Party
- Spouse: John Adamson
- Children: 4 (including 3 stepchildren)
- Education: Glasgow Caledonian University
- Website: Official website

Clare Anne Adamson (née Pickering; born 1 August 1967) is a Scottish politician serving as Deputy Presiding Officer of the Scottish Parliament, alongside Katy Clark, since May 2026. She has been the Member of the Scottish Parliament (MSP) for Motherwell and Wishaw since 2016. A member of the Scottish National Party (SNP), she was previously an additional MSP for the Central Scotland region from 2011 to 2016.

A graduate of the Glasgow Caledonian University, before entering politics Adamson was a computer scientist. In 2007, she was elected to the North Lanarkshire Council for the Wishaw ward. She ran unsuccessfully as a candidate for the Motherwell and Wishaw constituency, but was elected as an additional member for the Central Scotland region in 2011. Adamson was elected as the MSP for Motherwell and Wishaw in 2016 and was re-elected for a third term in the 2021 election. She has since served as the Convener of the Scottish Parliament's Constitution, Europe, External Affairs and Culture Committee.

== Early life and career ==
Clare Anne Pickering was born on 1 August 1967 in Motherwell, North Lanarkshire, to Eileen and George Pickering. She moved to grow up in Wishaw at the age of seven and she studied Computer Information Systems at Glasgow Caledonian University, graduating with the degree of BSc (with distinction).

In 1984 Adamson joined the Scottish National Party and she worked at the SNP HQ Campaign Unit as Project Manager of the Party's Activate Project from 2003 to 2007. She was previously a European Development Manager (IT) at a Glasgow-based software house. She belongs to the National Union of Journalists and is a Fellow of the British Computer Society.

Adamson ran as a candidate for the SNP in various elections, but was unsuccessful. She ran for election to the North Lanarkshire Council in 2003 and contested Lanark & Hamilton East in the 2010 UK General Election. In the 2007 Scottish local elections, she was elected to the North Lanarkshire Council, representing her home town of the Wishaw ward. She stood down from the council in the 2012 election following her election to the Scottish Parliament.

== Member of the Scottish Parliament ==
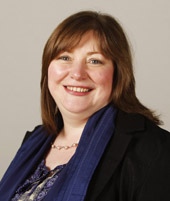
Official parliamentary portrait, 2011

In the 2011 Scottish Parliament election, Adamson was the SNP's candidate for the Motherwell and Wishaw constituency. She was defeated by Scottish Labour's John Pentland and was elected as an additional member of the Scottish Parliament for the Central Scotland region. After being elected to the parliament, she served as the Parliamentary Liaison Officer to Culture Secretary Fiona Hyslop.

Adamson has continued to be actively involved with the Scottish Accident Prevention Council, as Vice Chairperson, and the Lanarkshire International Children's Games Organising Committee.

Adamson ran again as candidate for the constituency of Motherwell and Wishaw. She successfully defeated John Pentland and was elected to represent the constituency in the Scottish Parliament. She was returned at the 2021 Scottish Parliament election. She has served as Convener of the Constitution, Europe, External Affairs and Culture Committee since 2021.

Following the 2026 Scottish Parliament election, Adamson was elected as deputy presiding officer of the Scottish Parliament, along with Katy Clark.

== Personal life ==
Adamson married John Adamson, a headteacher, in 2002. They have one son together, with her husband also having his own three children. She had a dog called Coco and enjoys reading and listening to music.

Scottish Parliament
Preceded by John Pentland	Member of the Scottish Parliament for Motherwell and Wishaw; 2016–present	Incumbent
