= Reform UK Scotland =

Political party in the United Kingdom

- Leader: Malcolm Offord
- Deputy Leader: Thomas Kerr
- Founders: Michelle Ballantyne; Richard Tice; Martyn Greene
- Founded: 11 January 2021; 5 years ago
- Headquarters: 180 West Regent Street; Glasgow; G2 4RW
- Ideology: Right-wing populism; Hard Euroscepticism
- Political position: Right-wing to far-right
- National affiliation: Reform UK
- Colours: Turquoise White
- Slogan: Scotland needs Reform
- House of Commons: 0 / 57 (Scottish seats)
- Scottish Parliament: 16 / 129
- Local government in Scotland: 23 / 1,226
- Councils led in Scotland: 0 / 32

Website
- reformuk.scot

Reform UK Scotland (Note: Alternatively Reform Party Scotland or simply Reform Scotland) is the Scottish branch of Reform UK active in Scotland. It holds 0 of 57 Scottish seats in the House of Commons, 16 of the 129 seats in the Scottish Parliament and 23 of the 1,226 local councillors across Scotland. It was founded on 11 January 2021. It is currently led by Malcolm Offord, who was elected as a regional MSP for West Scotland at the 2026 Scottish Parliament election.

== History ==
Reform Scotland was founded on 11 January 2021, shortly following the rebranding of the UK Brexit Party to Reform UK. In December 2025, Scottish Conservative politician Malcolm Offord defected to Reform. Reform UK leader Nigel Farage made Offord leader of the Scottish Reform wing on 15 January 2026. On 6 March, it was announced that he was contesting a seat in the Scottish Parliamentary constituency of Inverclyde.

Reform won their first council seat in Scotland on 12 December 2025.

At the 2026 Scottish Parliament election, the party won 17 seats, tying with Scottish Labour for second place at Holyrood. Offord failed to win the Inverclyde constituency, but was elected to Holyrood via the West Scotland regional list. Following the election, the party's Holyrood group elected Thomas Kerr as its deputy leader. Kerr, a former Scottish Conservative councillor for Shettleston who defected to Reform UK in January 2025, was elected as a Glasgow regional list MSP. The party campaigned on anti-immigrant rhetoric during the election. The Reform Party Scotland manifesto, released in March 2026, outlines plans to fix the NHS, give local councils more power, parliamentary reform, and changing the housing system to focus more on local residents.

In October 2026, Amanda Bland resigned from the party and now sits as an independent.

== Election results ==
=== Scottish Parliament ===
Election	Leader	Constituency			Regional			Total seats	+/–	Pos.	Government
Election	Leader	Votes	%	Seats	Votes	%	Seats	Total seats	+/–	Pos.	Government
2021	Michelle Ballantyne	Did not contest			5,793	0.21	0 / 56	0 / 129	N/A	N/A	Extraparliamentary
2026	Malcolm Offord	361,994	15.76	0 / 73	365,415	16.65	17 / 56	17 / 129	▲17	▲2nd (Note: Joint with Scottish Labour)	Opposition
