= Midlothian Council elections =

Local government elections in Midlothian, Scotland

Midlothian Council in Scotland holds elections every five years, previously holding them every four years from its creation as a single-tier authority in 1995 to 2007.

== Council elections ==
=== As a district council ===
Year	SNP	Labour	Conservative	Liberal (Note: Alliance from 1981 to 1988, Liberal Democrats from 1988 to 1995.)	Independent
1974	1	11	2	0	1
1977	5	7	2	0	1
1980 (Note: New ward boundaries.)	0	13	0	1	1
1984	0	14	1	1	0
1988	0	14	1	0	0
1992	1	12	1	0	0

=== As a unitary authority ===
Year	SNP	Labour	Conservative	Liberal Democrats	Green	Independent
1995	2	13	0	0	0	0
1999 (Note: New ward boundaries.)	0	17	0	1	0	0
2003	0	15	0	2	0	1
2007 (Note: Change to single transferable vote system and new ward boundaries.)	6	9	0	3	0	0
2012	8	8	0	0	1	1
2017 (Note: New ward boundaries.)	6	7	5	0	0	0
2022	8	7	3	0	0	0

== Results maps ==
1980 results map

1988 results map

1992 results map

1999 results map

2003 results map

2007 results map

2012 results map

2017 results map

2022 results map

== By-elections ==
=== 2003-2007 ===
Dalkeith/Woodburn By-Election 17 March 2005
Party	Candidate	Votes	%	±%
Liberal Democrats		742	52.6	+30.4
Labour		418	29.6	−18.6
SNP		179	12.7	−4.9
Scottish Socialist		48	3.4	−5.3
Conservative		24	1.7	−1.6
Majority		324	23.0	
Turnout		1,411		
Liberal Democrats gain from Labour		Swing		

Loanhead By-Election 10 November 2005
Party	Candidate	Votes	%	±%
SNP	Owen Thompson	768	45.4	+29.3
Labour		311	18.4	−15.4
Independent		268	15.8	+15.8
Independent		217	12.8	+12.8
Liberal Democrats		97	5.7	−5.3
Conservative		13	0.8	−3.8
Independent		9	0.5	+0.5
Green		8	0.5	+0.5
Majority		457	27.0	
Turnout		1,691		
SNP gain from Independent		Swing		

=== 2012-2017 ===
Midlothian East By-Election 27 November 2014
Party	Candidate	FPv%	Count				
Party	Candidate	FPv%	1	2	3	4	5
Labour	Kenny Young	32.9	1,294	1,310	1,343	1,443	1,682
SNP	Colin Cassidy	32.1	1,260	1,270	1,357	1,384	1,613
Independent	Robert Hogg	19.8	780	789	831	914	
Conservative	Andrew Hardie	8.4	331	342	359		
Green	Bill Kerr-Smith	5.0	197	210			
Liberal Democrats	Euan Davidson	1.7	68				
Labour hold							
Valid: 3,930 Spoilt: 40 Quota: 1,966 Turnout: 3,970

Midlothian West By-Election 10 September 2015
Party	Candidate	FPv%	Count		
Party	Candidate	FPv%	1	2	3
SNP	Kelly Parry	43.2	1,540	1,558	1,701
Labour	Ian Miller	26.5	945	977	1,082
Conservative	Pauline Winchester	14.7	524	570	618
Green	Daya Feldwick	10.4	372	420	
Liberal Democrats	Jane Davidson	4.5	162		
Independent	David Tedford	0.7	25		
SNP hold					
Valid: 3,568 Spoilt: 49 Quota: 1,785 Turnout: 3,617

=== 2012-2017 ===
Penicuik By-Election 22 March 2018
Party	Candidate	FPv%	Count		
Party	Candidate	FPv%	1	2	3
SNP	Joe Wallace	35.0	1,663	1,803	2,237
Conservative	Murdo MacDonald	30.2	1,433	1,469	1,788
Labour	Vivienne Wallace	27.6	1,310	1,414	
Green	Helen Armstrong	7.2	344		
Valid: 4,781 Spoilt: 31 Quota: 2,376 Turnout: 4,812

Midlothian East By-Election 25 March 2021
Party	Candidate	FPv%	Count			
Party	Candidate	FPv%	1	2	3	4
SNP	Stuart McKenzie	35.4	1,538	1,547	1,662	1,963
Conservative	Alan Symon	29.4	1,279	1,326	1,364	1,656
Labour	Hazel Flanagan	24.6	1,070	1,114	1,222	
Green	Joy Godfrey	6.5	282	332		
Liberal Democrats	Margaret Davis	4.1	178			
Valid: 4,347 Spoilt: 21 Quota: 2,174 Turnout: 4,368
