= Dalkeith (ward) =

Midlothian Council ward

Location of the ward

Dalkeith is one of the six wards used to elect members of the Midlothian Council. It elects three Councillors.

== Councillors ==
Election	Councillors		
2007	Craig Statham (SNP)	Alex Bennett (Labour)	Margot Russell (Labour)
2012	Jim Bryant (SNP)	Alex Bennett (Labour)	Margot Russell (Labour)
2017	Colin Cassidy (SNP)	Stephen Curran (Labour)	Margot Russell (Labour)
2022	Colin Cassidy (SNP)	Stephen Curran (Labour)	Margot Russell (Labour)

== Election results ==
=== 2017 Election ===
2017 Midlothian Council election

Dalkeith - 3 seats
Party	Candidate	FPv%	Count						
Party	Candidate	FPv%	1	2	3	4	5	6	7
SNP	Colin Cassidy	27.2	1,142						
Labour	Stephen Curran	23.2	976	980.7	1,000.9	1,051.6			
Labour	Margot Russell (incumbent)	19.1	800	804.2	840.4	884.7	885.9	993.5	1,317.5
Conservative	Robin Traquair	16.8	706	707.3	716.3	779.4	779.4	791.8	
Independent	Jim Bryant (incumbent)	5.9	248	249.9	275.1				
Green	Jill Simon	4.0	168	171.9					
SNP	Gary Young	3.8	158	229.1	282.0	330.4	330.5		
Electorate: TBC Valid: 4,198 Spoilt: 121 Quota: 1,050 Turnout: 41.9%

=== 2012 Election ===
2012 Midlothian Council election

Dalkeith - 3 seats
Party	Candidate	FPv%	Count				
Party	Candidate	FPv%	1	2	3	4	5
Labour	Alex Bennett	31.6	1,021				
SNP	Jim Bryant	24.9	803	816.9			
Labour	Margot Russell (incumbent)	18.7	604	760.2	760.6	774.9	810.6
SNP	Colin Cassidy	12.7	410	417.7	425.6	447.6	469.1
Conservative	Robin Traquair	5.7	184	187.3	187.4	194.8	235.2
Liberal Democrats	George Boyd	4.1	133	138.8	138.9	152.4	
TUSC	Willie Duncan	2.3	75	80.8	80.9		
Electorate: 8,678 Valid: 3,230 Spoilt: 81 Quota: 808 Turnout: 3,311 (37.22%)

=== 2007 Election ===
2007 Midlothian Council election

Midlothian council election, 2007: Dalkeith
Party	Candidate	FPv%	%	Seat	Count
SNP	Craig Statham	1,333	29.9	1	1
Labour	Alex Bennett†††	1,331	29.9	2	1
Labour	Margot Russell	761	17.1	3	7
Liberal Democrats	Ray Prior	657	14.8		
Conservative	Rosemary McDougall	217	4.9		
Solidarity	Alan Boyce	94	2.1		
Scottish Socialist	Bob Goupillot	60	1.3		
