= Midlothian South (ward) =

Electoral ward in Midlothian, Scotland

Location of the ward

Midlothian South is one of the six wards used to elect members of the Midlothian Council. It elects three Councillors.

== Councillors ==
Election	Councillors		
2007	Colin Beattie (SNP)	Wilma Chalmers (Labour)	James Muirhead (Labour)
2012	Cath Johnstone (SNP)	Bryan Pottinger (Labour)	James Muirhead (Labour)
2017	Cath Johnstone (SNP)	Kieran Munro (Conservative)	James Muirhead (Labour)
2022	Douglas Bowen (SNP)	Ellen Scott (SNP)	Kelly Drummond (Labour)

== Election results ==
=== 2017 Election ===
2017 Midlothian Council election

Midlothian South - 3 seats
Party	Candidate	FPv%	Count						
Party	Candidate	FPv%	1	2	3	4	5	6	7
Labour	Jim Muirhead (incumbent)	24.6	1,218	1,257					
SNP	Cath Johnstone (incumbent)	21.6	1,067	1,104	1,104.9	1,164.8	1,295.1		
Conservative	Kieran Munro	15.8	781	801	802.0	867.0	1,048.4	1,050.7	1,249.7
SNP	Ellen Scott	13.3	658	721	721.9	748.3	797.5	844.1	
Independent	Jason Ferry	9.7	478	541	541.9	625.5			
Labour	Bryan Pottinger (incumbent)	9.4	464	497	510.8				
Green	Malcolm Spaven	5.7	283						
Electorate: TBC Valid: 4,949 Spoilt: 76 Quota: 1,238 Turnout: 45.2%

=== 2012 Election ===
2012 Midlothian Council election

Midlothian South - 3 seats
Party	Candidate	FPv%	Count				
Party	Candidate	FPv%	1	2	3	4	5
Labour	Jim Muirhead (incumbent)	36.0	1,305				
SNP	Cath Johnstone	21.7	786	807.9	845.1	855.7	1538.5
SNP	Dougie Crawford	19.1	693	706.1	729.7	732.3	
Labour	Bryan Pottinger	15.4	559	870.9	947.9		
Conservative	Peter Smaill	7.8	283	293.9			
Electorate: 9,288 Valid: 3,626 Spoilt: 68 Quota: 907 Turnout: 3,694 (39.04%)

=== 2007 Election ===
2007 Midlothian Council election

Midlothian council election, 2007: Midlothian South
Party	Candidate	FPv%	%	Seat	Count
SNP	Colin Beattie	1,892	37.4	1	1
Labour	Wilma Chalmers	1,336	26.4	2	1
Labour	James Muirhead	1,184	23.4	3	2
Conservative	Peter Smaill	486	9.6		
Solidarity	Willie Duncan	84	1.7		
Scottish Socialist	John Carroll	80	1.6		
