= Midlothian Council =

Unitary authority council in Midlothian, Scotland

Midlothian Council Comhairle Lodainn Mheadhanaich
- Coat of arms

- Council logo

Type
- Type: Unitary authority

Leadership
- Provost: Debbi McCall, SNP since 24 May 2022
- Leader: Kelly Parry, SNP since 24 May 2022
- Chief Executive: Grace Vickers since 26 June 2018

Structure
- Seats: 18 councillors
- Graph of the party split among 18 seats.
- Political groups: Administration (8) SNP (8) Other parties (10) Labour (6) Conservative (2) Independent (2)

Elections
- Voting system: Single transferable vote
- Last election: 5 May 2022
- Next election: 6 May 2027

Meeting place
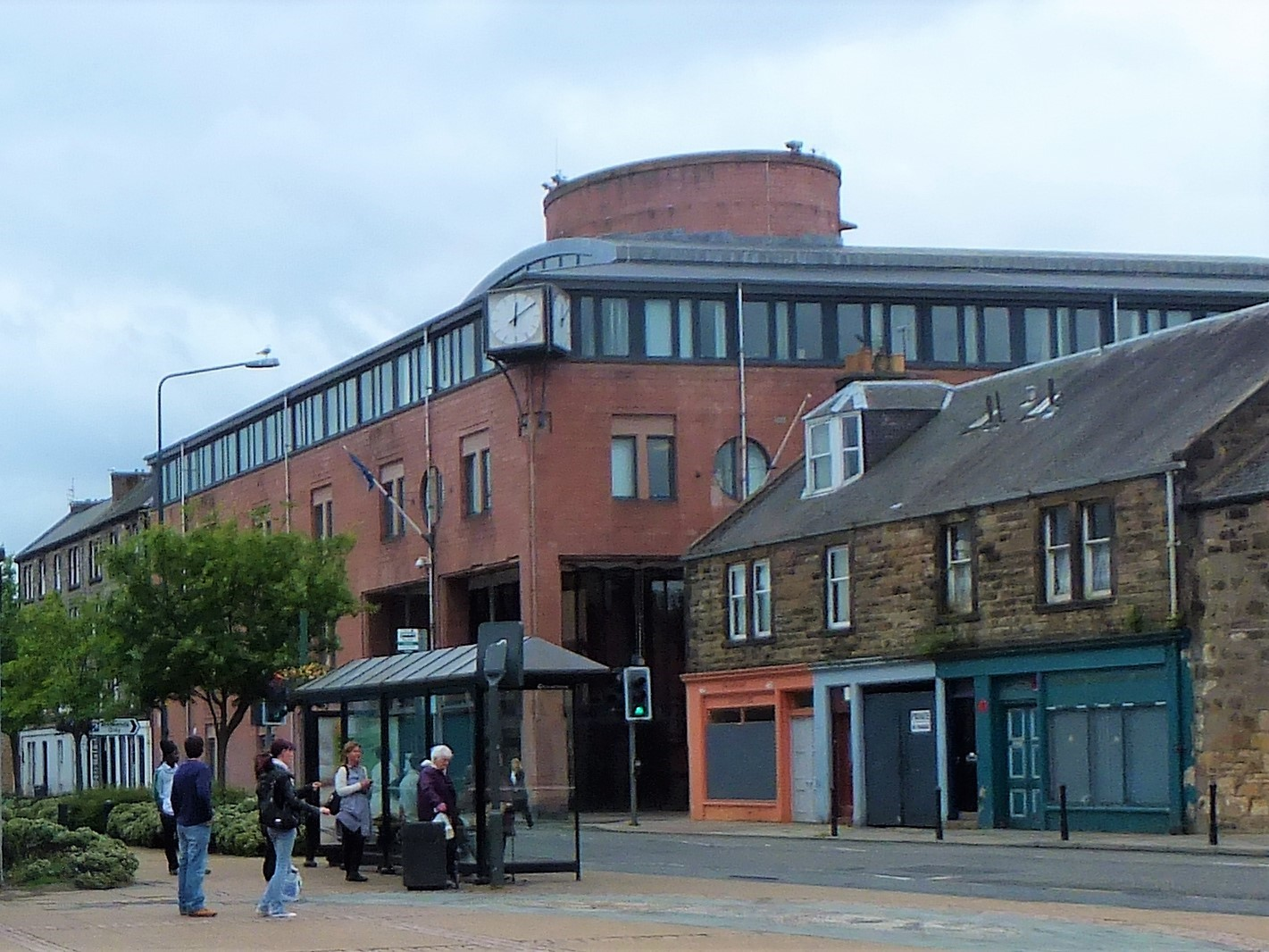
- Midlothian House, 40–46 Buccleuch Street, Dalkeith, EH22 1DN

Website
- www.midlothian.gov.uk

Midlothian Council (Scottish Gaelic: Comhairle Lodainn Mheadhanaich) is the local authority for Midlothian, one of the 32 council areas of Scotland, covering an area immediately south of the city of Edinburgh. The council is based in Dalkeith. Since the last boundary changes in 2017, eighteen councillors have been elected from six wards.

== History ==
Midlothian District Council was created in 1975 as one of four districts within the Lothian region. The Midlothian district took its name from the historic county of Midlothian, which had covered a larger area. The Lothian region was abolished in 1996, when the four districts in the region, including Midlothian, became unitary council areas.

== Political control ==
The council has been under no overall control since 2012. Since the 2022 election it has been run by a Scottish National Party minority administration.

The first election to the Midlothian District Council was held in 1974, initially operating as a shadow authority alongside the outgoing authorities until the new system came into force on 16 May 1975. A shadow authority was again elected in 1995 ahead of the reforms which came into force on 1 April 1996. Political control of the council since 1975 has been as follows:

Midlothian District Council

Party in control	Years
Labour	1975–1977
No overall control	1977–1980
Labour	1980–1996

Midlothian Council

Party in control	Years
Labour	1996–2007
No overall control	2007–2008
Labour	2008–2012
No overall control	2012–present

=== Leadership ===
Midlothian Council operates a cabinet-based decision making model working collaboratively with the Council and Performance Review Committee. Each cabinet member has a portfolio of responsibilities. The leaders of the council since 2003 have been:

Councillor	Party	From	To
Adam Montgomery	Labour	2003	2007
Derek Milligan	Labour	2007	May 2012
Lisa Beattie	SNP	22 May 2012	25 Jun 2012
Bob Constable	SNP	3 Jul 2012	18 Nov 2013
Owen Thompson	SNP	19 Nov 2013	22 Jun 2015
Cath Johnstone	SNP	23 Jun 2015	May 2017
Derek Milligan	Labour	23 May 2017	May 2022
Kelly Parry	SNP	24 May 2022	

=== Composition ===
Following the 2022 election and subsequent changes up to October 2026, the composition of the council was:

Party	Seats
SNP	8
Labour	6
Conservative	2
Independent	2
Total	18

The next election is due in 2027.

== Elections ==
Since 2007 elections have been held every five years under the single transferable vote system, introduced by the Local Governance (Scotland) Act 2004. Election results since 1995 have been as follows:

Year	Seats	SNP	Labour	Conservative	Green	Liberal Democrats	Independent / Other	Notes
1995	15	2	13	0	0	0	0	Labour majority
1999	18	0	17	0	0	1	0	New ward boundaries. Labour majority
2003	18	0	15	0	0	2	1	Labour majority
2007	18	6	9	0	0	3	0	New ward boundaries.
2012	18	8	8	0	1	0	1	SNP coalition
2017	18	6	7	5	0	0	0	New ward boundaries. Labour minority
2022	18	8	7	3	0	0	0	SNP minority

== Premises ==
The council is based at Midlothian House at 40–46 Buccleuch Street in Dalkeith. The building was purpose-built for the district council in 1991 at a cost of £6 million.

== Wards ==
Map of the area's wards (2017 configuration)

The council is composed of 6 wards, each electing 3 councillors.

Ward number	Ward name	Seats
1	Penicuik	3
2	Bonnyrigg	3
3	Dalkeith	3
4	Midlothian West	3
5	Midlothian East	3
6	Midlothian South	3
