= Bonnyrigg (ward) =

Electoral ward in the UK

Bonnyrigg is one of the six wards used to elect members of Midlothian Council in Scotland. It elects three Councillors.

== Councillors ==
Election	Councillors		
2007	Bob Constable (SNP)	Jack Aitchison (Labour)	Derek Milligan (Labour)
2012	Bob Constable (SNP)	Ian Baxter (Greens)	Derek Milligan (Labour)
2017	Dianne Alexander (SNP)	Janet Lay-Douglas (Conservative)	Derek Milligan (Labour)
2022	Dianne Alexander (SNP)	David Virgo (Conservative)	Derek Milligan (Labour)

== Election results ==
=== 2017 election ===
2017 Midlothian Council election

Bonnyrigg - 3 seats
Party	Candidate	FPv%	Count					
Party	Candidate	FPv%	1	2	3	4	5	6
Labour	Derek Milligan (incumbent)	29.0	1,901					
Conservative	Janet Lay-Douglas	21.6	1,415	1,425.6	1,515.9	1,521.3	1,524.7	1,708.1
SNP	Dianne Alexander	18.4	1,203	1,210.0	1,222.4	1,778.9		
Green	Ian Baxter (incumbent)	10.7	701	713.7	763.8	799.9	870.2	1,037.0
SNP	Colin Lawrie	9.4	617	623.3	632.6			
Labour	Louie Lorraine Milliken	7.1	466	665.6	715.8	728.1	741.4	
Independent	George McIntyre	3.8	250	257.4				
Electorate: TBC Valid: 6,553 Spoilt: 103 Quota: 1,639 Turnout: 48.5%

=== 2012 election ===
2012 Midlothian Council election

Bonnyrigg - 3 seats
Party	Candidate	FPv%	Count						
Party	Candidate	FPv%	1	2	3	4	5	6	7
Labour	Derek Milligan (incumbent)	30.67	1,574						
SNP	Bob Constable (incumbent)	24.49	1,257	1,272.1	1,566.5				
Green	Ian Baxter	13.07	671	681.3	704.2	787.1	930.4	1,079.9	1,407.4
Labour	Louie Lorraine Milliken	10.23	525	749.4	768.5	809.4	864.9	1,020.4	
Independent	Jack Aitchison (incumbent)	7.44	382	396.9	406.5	430.3	474.1		
Conservative	Emma Cummings	7.11	365	368.5	373.5	386.8			
SNP	Thomas Munro	6.98	358	366.5					
Electorate: 12,007 Valid: 5,132 Spoilt: 99 Quota: 1,284 Turnout: 5,205 (42.74%)

=== 2007 election ===
2007 Midlothian Council election

Midlothian council election, 2007: Bonnyrigg
Party	Candidate	FPv%	%	Seat	Count
SNP	Bob Constable	1,905	30.3	1	1
Labour	Jack Aitchison††	1,530	24.4	2	2
Labour	Derek Milligan	1,383	22.0	3	7
Green	Ian Baxter	650	10.4		
Conservative	John Stoddart	600	9.6		
Scottish Socialist	Neil Bennet	138	2.2		
Solidarity	Chris Moyers	71	1.1		
