= 2023 Scottish National Party leadership election =

- 16 February – 27 March 2023
- Turnout: 50,494 (69.97%) ▼9.26 pp (Note: Compared to 2004)
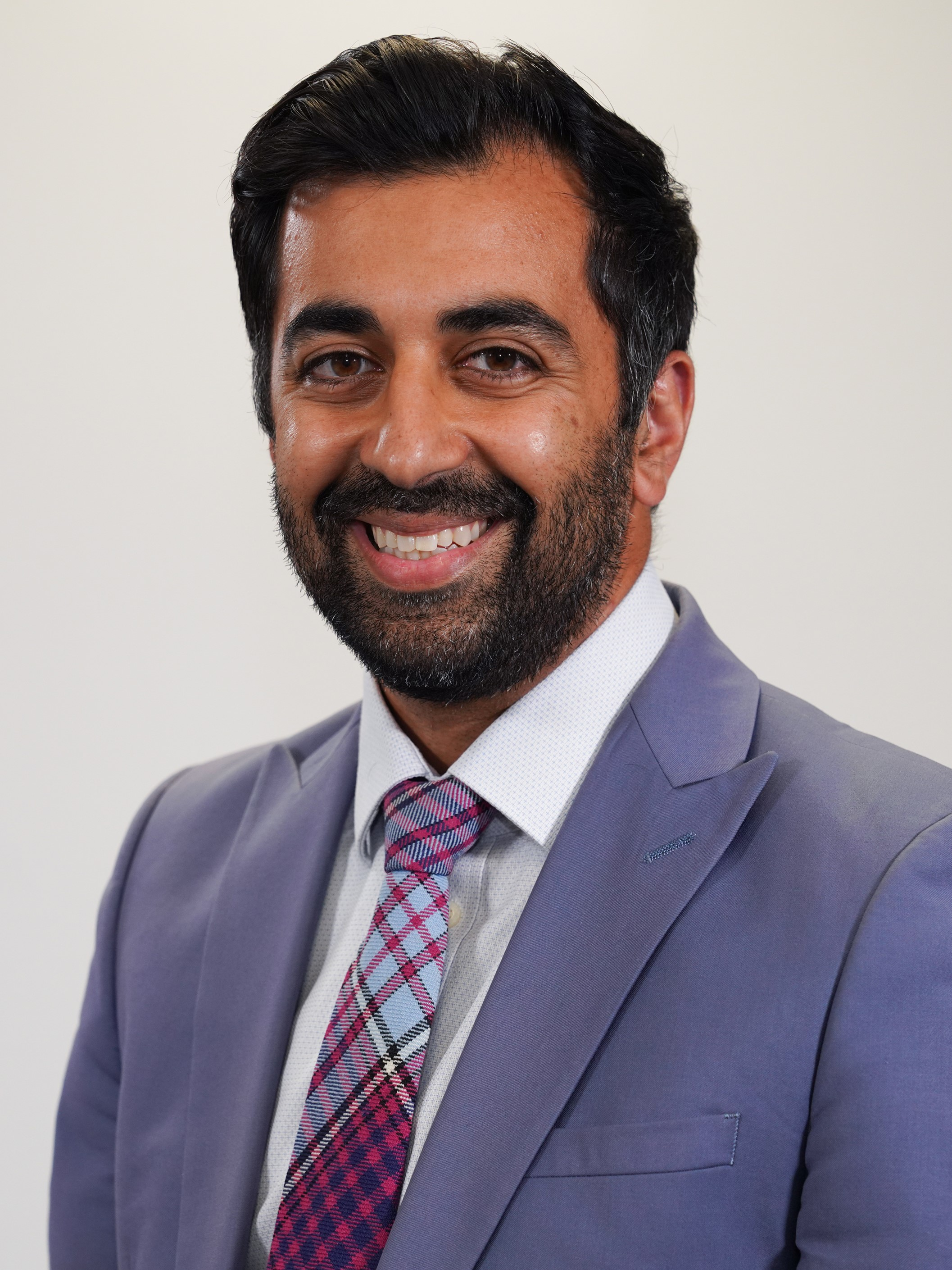

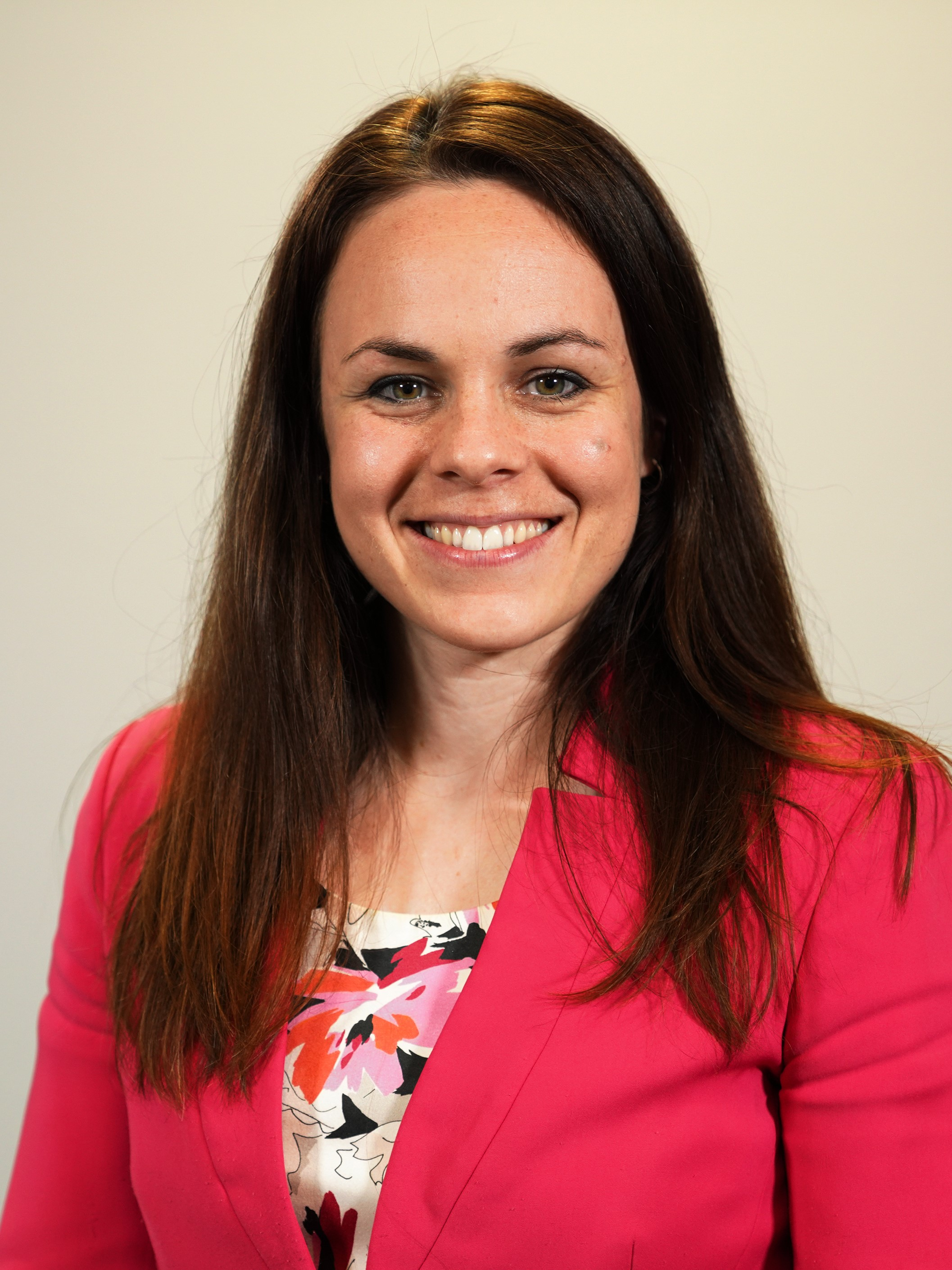

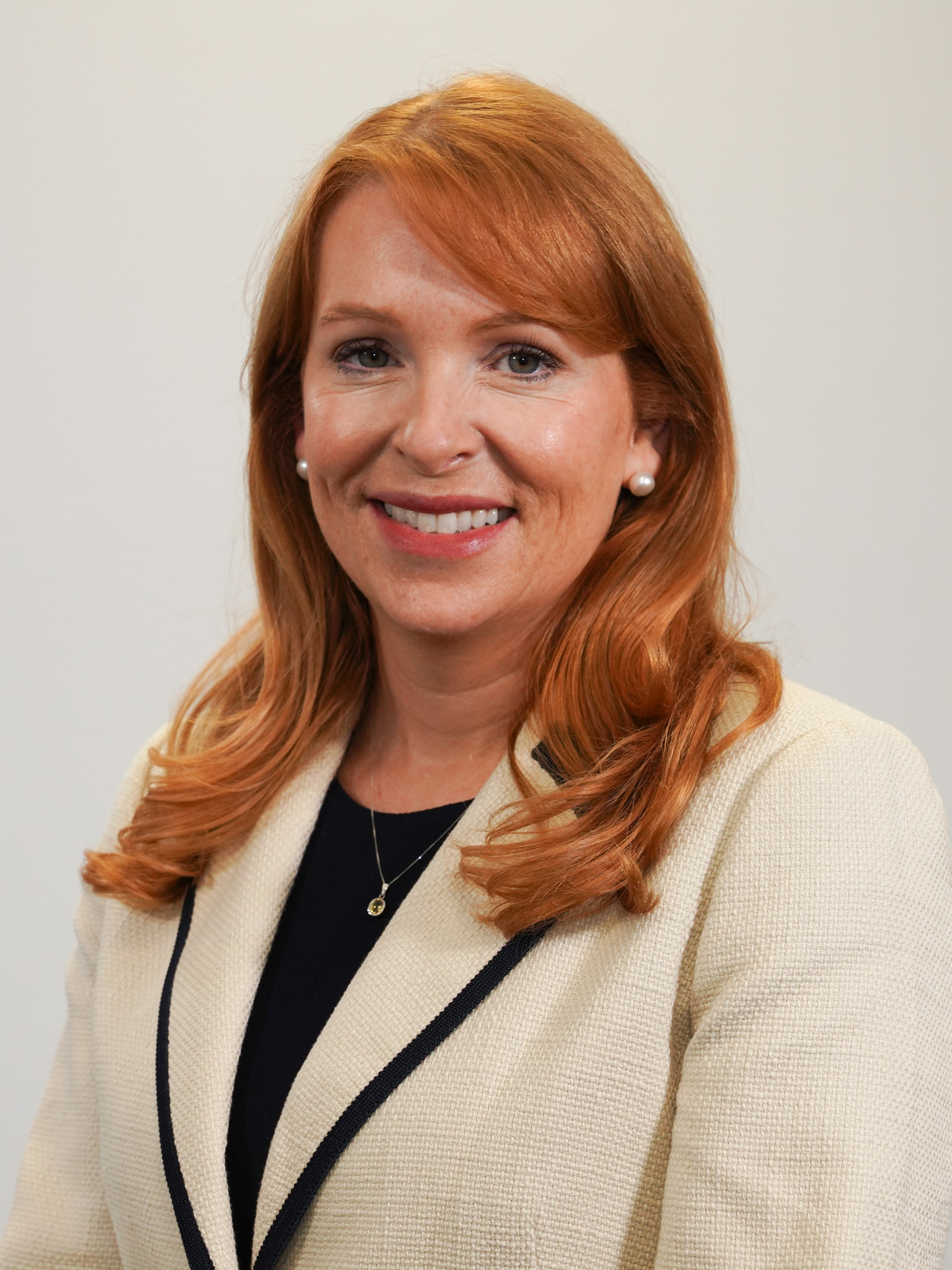
Candidate	Humza Yousaf	Kate Forbes	Ash Regan
First round	24,336 (48.2%)	20,559 (40.7%)	5,599 (11.1%)
Second round	26,032 (52.1%)	23,890 (47.9%)	Eliminated
Leader before election
Nicola Sturgeon
Elected Leader
Humza Yousaf

The 2023 Scottish National Party leadership election took place in February and March 2023 to choose the leader of the Scottish National Party (SNP) to succeed Nicola Sturgeon, who announced her resignation on 15 February. Nominations closed on 24 February 2023 with three candidates: Kate Forbes, Ash Regan, and Humza Yousaf being presented to the electorate of party members. Yousaf was elected the new leader on 27 March with 48.2% of first preference votes and 52.1% of the vote after third-placed candidate Regan's second preferences were redistributed. Yousaf was elected as the First Minister of Scotland on 28 March 2023.

This was the first contested leadership election in the SNP in nearly twenty years as Sturgeon was elected unopposed in the previous election held in 2014. During the course of the election, both the party's chief executive, Peter Murrell (also Sturgeon's husband), and MSP group media chief, Murray Foote, resigned from their positions on 18 and 17 March, respectively, over inaccurate party's membership numbers being communicated.

== Background ==
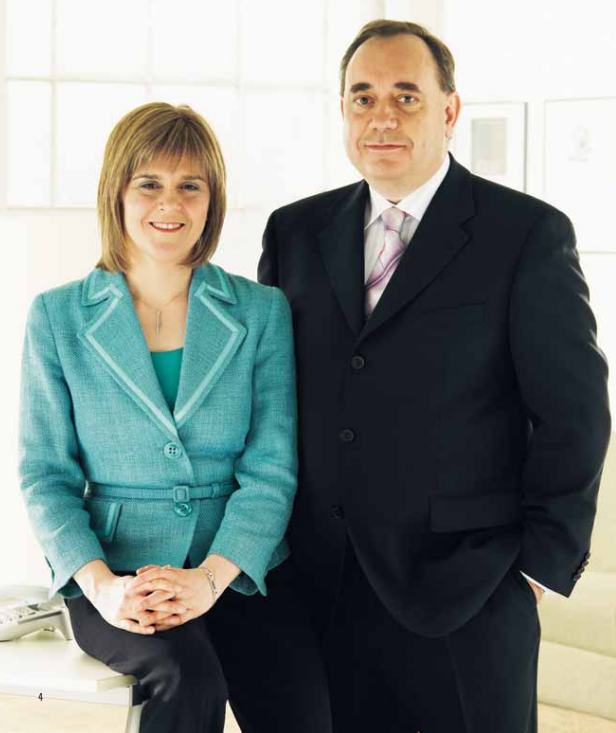
Alex Salmond (right) was succeeded as Leader of the SNP by Nicola Sturgeon (left) following the 2014 leadership election.

In 2004, Alex Salmond became leader of the SNP, having previously led the party from 1990 to 2000. In the 2007 Scottish Parliament election, the SNP won a plurality of votes and seats and Salmond became the first minister of Scotland. In the 2011 Scottish Parliament election, the SNP won a majority of seats on a platform of delivering a referendum on Scottish independence. This referendum took place in 2014, with the question "should Scotland become an independent country?". A majority of voters, 55.3%, answered "no", and Salmond resigned as leader and first minister. His deputy first minister since 2007 and depute leader of the SNP since 2004, Nicola Sturgeon, was elected unopposed as his successor.

Sturgeon led the SNP in the 2016 Scottish Parliament election, forming a minority government. She again led the party into the 2021 Scottish Parliament election, which led to a power-sharing agreement with the Scottish Greens. Over the same period, the party won a majority of seats in each of the 2015, 2017, and 2019 general elections, winning all but three seats in Scotland in the 2015 election. Sturgeon's government advocated for another Scottish independence referendum, but in 2022 the UK Supreme Court ruled they did not have the legal standing to hold one without agreement from Westminster. On 25 May 2022, she became the longest-serving first minister of Scotland since the role was established in 1999, surpassing the record held by Salmond.

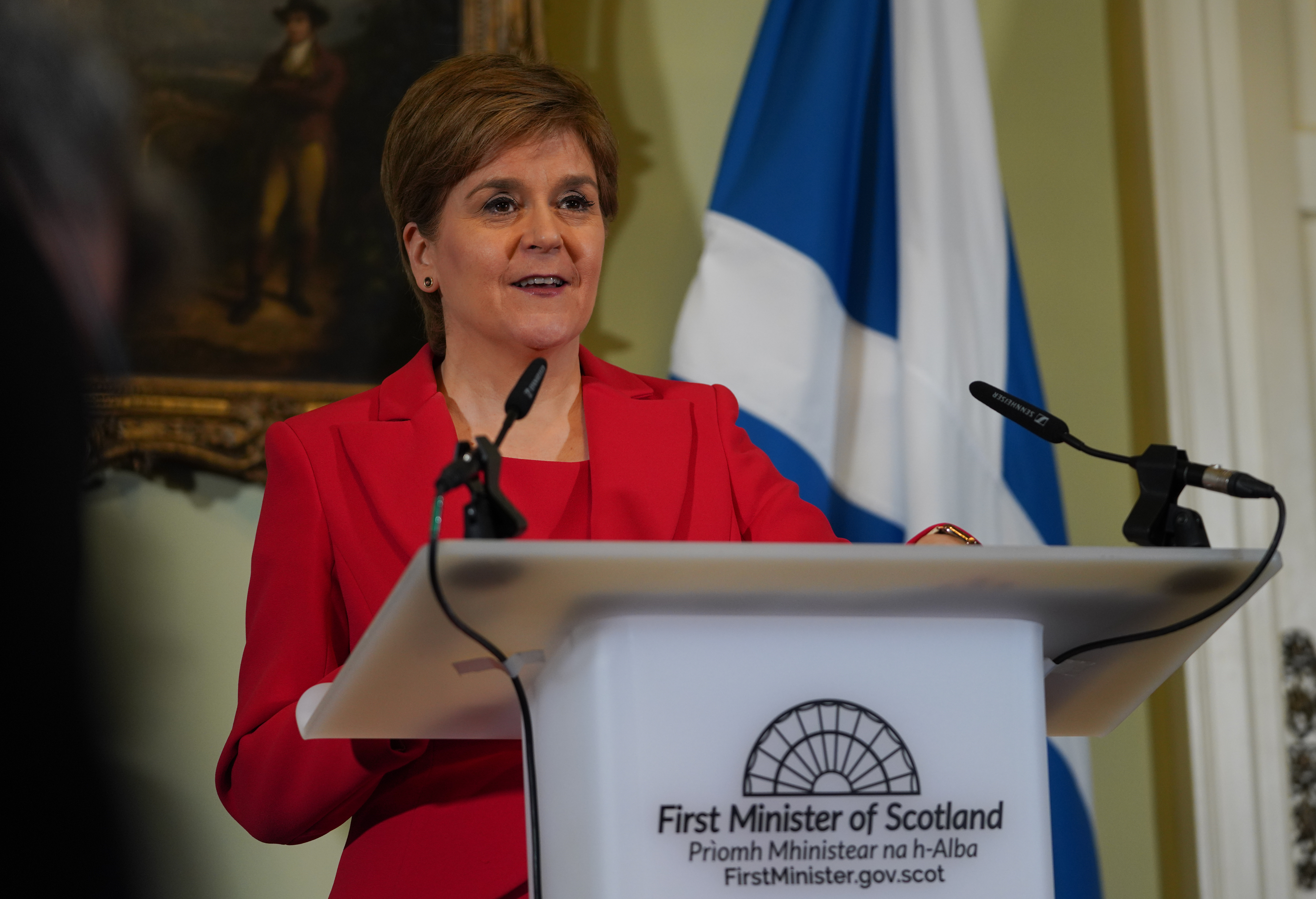
Sturgeon announcing her intention to resign on 15 February 2023 at Bute House

On 15 February 2023, Sturgeon announced her intention to stand down as the leader of the SNP and first minister, saying that she would remain in office until a new leader was elected. Sturgeon insisted that her resignation was not due to "short term pressures" but said that the job "takes its toll on you." She said she would remain in office as a Member of the Scottish Parliament (MSP) until the next Scottish Parliament election, expected to be held in 2026. On 2 March, John Swinney, the Deputy First Minister, and only person other than Sturgeon to be in Cabinet since the SNP came to power in 2007, also announced that after 16 years he planned to leave Government following the contest. Sturgeon's husband, Peter Murrell, initially remained the SNP's chief executive, although there were calls for him to resign. However, he would subsequently resign on 18 March.

Sturgeon said that the timing of her decision was determined by an impending special SNP conference to decide the party's strategy on independence, which had been due to take place on 19 March 2023. Her proposal for the event was that the next general or Scottish Parliament election should be treated as a de facto referendum on independence. This plan was controversial within the party. Among others, the leader of the SNP in the House of Commons, Stephen Flynn, called for the conference to be postponed following Sturgeon's resignation. The party's national executive committee decided on 16 February 2023 to postpone it.

Sturgeon's resignation came following years during which the party's reputation for discipline had been frayed, two years after the conclusion of an inquiry into the handling of complaints of sexual harassment against her predecessor, of which he was acquitted in court in 2020, after which inquiry Salmond launched the electorally unsuccessful splinter Alba Party. It came during an ongoing dispute over the Gender Recognition Reform (Scotland) Bill and an ongoing fraud investigation into the SNP. It followed two months after a change in leadership at the SNP Westminster group, after Ian Blackford, seen as an ally of Sturgeon, denied being forced out by other MPs, where Alison Thewliss, also seen as an ally of Sturgeon, was defeated.

The Scottish Greens stated they would decide whether to continue the power-sharing agreement with the SNP after the new leader was chosen.

== Issues ==
There were three main issues in the leadership campaign: economics, Scottish independence, and gender recognition reform.

=== Economics ===
Before the leadership election, the SNP government in Scotland and their coalition partners in the Scottish Green Party were criticised by critics on the right of being "anti-growth" with a rejection of new drilling for oil and gas, a bottle recycling scheme, and curbs on advertising alcohol. Meanwhile, critics on the left have accused the government of adopting neoliberal economic policies, selling off green energy resources, and supporting free ports.

Forbes was seen as being the most friendly candidate for business. The power-sharing agreement with the Greens was seen to be under threat from either Forbes or Regan winning. All three candidates expressed concerns over the bottle recycling scheme.

=== Independence ===
The SNP's strategy for achieving Scottish independence, the central goal of the party, was expected to be one of the main issues in the leadership campaign. There was considerable opposition within the party towards Sturgeon's plan to treat the next UK general election in Scotland as a de facto referendum on independence.

Regan was the most aggressive in her approach. She said she would treat all future elections, to the Scottish or UK Parliaments, as de facto referendums. If parties supporting Scottish independence received more than 50% of the vote in any future election, Regan argues that this would be a mandate to open negotiations with the UK government on Scottish independence, without a standalone referendum being required. Forbes and Yousaf have both focused on making the case for independence and growing support. Forbes also pledged to transfer the power to call a referendum from the UK Parliament to the Scottish Parliament within three months of winning a majority at the next Westminster election, although she did not explain how.

All three candidates said that in the event of a hung Parliament after the 2024 United Kingdom general election, they would be open to supporting a Labour minority government in return for the transfer to the Scottish Parliament of the power to hold a new referendum on independence. Labour leader Keir Starmer said he would not agree to such a deal under any circumstances.

=== Gender recognition reform ===
As part of the power-sharing agreement with the Scottish Greens, Sturgeon committed to prioritising reform to gender recognition law, having delayed previous work on the issue due to the COVID-19 pandemic. This resulted in the passage of the Gender Recognition Reform (Scotland) Bill in December 2022, which aimed to make it easier for transgender people to change their legal gender. 54 SNP MSPs voted for the bill, while nine broke the party whip to vote against it, including Ash Regan, and one, Kate Forbes, did not vote. Forbes was on maternity leave but was seen as less supportive of the bill, though remained part of the Government, indicating support, unlike Regan who resigned. Humza Yousaf supported the bill. In response to the bill passing the third reading in Holyrood, the UK government issued a Section 35 order blocking the bill and the Scottish Government has yet to decide its response. The Scottish Government were given until the middle of April to launch a judicial review of the Section 35 order.

Conflict over the bill had the potential to jeopardise the SNP–Green power-sharing agreement, as the Greens were strongly in favour of the bill. Two Green ministers in government said that they would resign from the Scottish Government if the bill is dropped or significantly altered. As the SNP did not have a majority in the Scottish Parliament, the Greens leaving the Government would make it difficult for the SNP to enact any parliamentary business, and could have precipitated a snap election.

After Sturgeon announced her resignation, Regan and the SNP MP Joanna Cherry, also opposed to the bill, argued that former members who had recently left the party should be allowed to rejoin and take part in the leadership vote. The proposal was aimed at involving past members who quit in protest over the bill. The deputy first minister John Swinney said that the proposal was "preposterous" and that the rules were already determined that would only allow current members to vote.

Out for Independence, the SNP's LGBTQ+ wing stated that they were "incredibly disappointed with the way this leadership campaign has been conducted and the tone and language that have been adopted toward the LGBTQ+ community."

== Campaign ==
=== Nomination period ===
The former leader of the party in the House of Commons, and former party deputy leader, Angus Robertson, was initially seen as the most likely candidate to succeed Sturgeon by the betting markets. However, on 20 February, he announced that he would not be standing, citing his young family as the reason. The deputy first minister John Swinney was initially considered another potential candidate. However, he ruled himself out of the contest on 16 February. It was also reported that Keith Brown and Màiri McAllan were considering entering the race. On 19 February, Brown ruled himself out of the leadership contest, stating "he could better serve the party in his current post" as depute leader. The same day, McAllan also ruled out standing.

With Kate Forbes's campaign announcement on 20 February, there were expected to be just three candidates: Forbes, Ash Regan and Humza Yousaf, the latter two having declared on 18 February. Yousaf was seen as the continuity candidate, supporting the Gender Recognition Reform (Scotland) Bill, but he did not commit to the idea of using the next general election as a de facto referendum. Regan opposed the Gender Recognition Reform bill but supported a more aggressive version of the de facto referendum plan. Forbes, having been on maternity leave, had been absent from these two debates previously, but later declared her opposition to the Gender Recognition Reform bill. Yousaf and Forbes both supported trying to grow support in Scotland for independence rather than the de facto referendum plan. Once all three candidates had declared, Forbes was considered the most likely winner by bookmakers, followed by Yousaf, with Regan thought to be much less likely to win.

After controversy over Forbes's declaration that she would have voted against legalising same-sex marriage, several of her supporters withdrew their endorsements. The social security minister Ben Macpherson said he had been encouraged by members to stand as a fourth candidate, but chose not to. At First Minister's Questions on 23 February, Conservative and Labour politicians criticised Yousaf's governance of the NHS.

=== Kate Forbes ===
The finance secretary Kate Forbes was on maternity leave when Sturgeon announced her resignation plans. Forbes announced her candidacy on 20 February. She was considered a favourite to win the election from the beginning. She was considered more centrist than the other candidates and on the political right wing of the SNP, but denied that her leadership would see the party shift to the right. Forbes was the youngest candidate, aged 32 at the time of the election.

On independence, Forbes said that she considered Sturgeon's proposal of using a parliamentary election as a de facto referendum to be a way to apply pressure on the UK government to grant permission to hold a formal referendum "rather than it being necessarily a referendum in and of itself". She said she wanted to achieve independence by delivering economic growth.

Members of the SNP expressed concern over Forbes's membership of the Free Church of Scotland, an evangelical Calvinist denomination with socially conservative positions on abortion and LGBT issues. The Church opposes abortion and same-sex marriage, as well as a proposed ban on conversion therapy. Forbes said she "[makes her] own decisions" on issues "according to [her] faith, not according to the diktat of any church". Forbes called criticism of her religious views "illiberal discourse" and said that "if my faith is the only thing that people can find to attack, that suggests that my competence, my vision and my experience, speak for themselves".

At a prayer breakfast in 2018, Forbes said that progress should be measured by how society treated the "unborn", a reference to abortion policy. After launching her leadership campaign, she said that she would not have voted to legalise same-sex marriage if she had been in office at the time, but that she would defend it now it was law. Due to these comments, Forbes lost the support of the ministers Richard Lochhead, Clare Haughey and Tom Arthur. She also lost the support of the backbenchers Gillian Martin MSP and Drew Hendry MP. Forbes said she had tried "to answer straight questions with straight answers", but that she regretted "enormously the pain or hurt that has been caused" by her comments. On the issue of conversion therapy, Forbes said that any laws should also protect freedom of expression for religious people.

On 20 February she said that she would not have supported the Gender Recognition Reform bill in its current form and would have resigned from Sturgeon's cabinet if she had not been on maternity leave during the vote. She does not support challenging the UK government's Section 35 order stopping it, instead seeking to negotiate with the UK government to agree changes to the bill. She said that she disagreed with the principle of gender self-identification being sufficient for recognition. When asked if trans women are women, Forbes said that "a trans woman is a biological male who identifies as a woman". One of the co-conveners of the SNP's LGBT+ wing, Erin Lux, reported her to the party over this statement meeting the party's definition for transphobia. Forbes also said that the transgender rapist Isla Bryson, whose case sparked controversy in Scotland, was a man. Members of the Scottish Greens also expressed concern over Forbes' views and suggested that their party might leave their co-operation agreement with the SNP if she became leader. Forbes said that she would not end the co-operation agreement but would not change her economic plans to accommodate the Greens.

Following her controversial media appearances during the first two days of her campaign, Forbes took 22 February off. The following day, Forbes released a statement saying that she had listened carefully to the criticism and would pledge to uphold and enhance the rights of minorities.

On housing, Forbes said that she would set up a new government organisation to build houses in Scotland and allow councils to charge a higher rate of council tax on unoccupied second homes. She said she would finish the conversion of the A9 and A96 to dual carriageways faster than planned, saying that car ownership was a "necessity" for communities in the Highlands.

Deputy Westminster leader of the SNP Mhairi Black raised concerns that Forbes' social views could cause the SNP to split into multiple parties if she became leader.

=== Ash Regan ===
The former community safety minister Ash Regan announced her candidacy on 18 February 2023 and formally launched her campaign on 24 February in North Queensferry. She said she would abandon the Gender Recognition Reform Bill, which she resigned her ministerial post in protest against. She said she would seek to introduce new laws to ensure all transgender women go to men's prisons and all transgender men go to women's prisons, suggesting "a trans wing on the prison estate". She said she supported same-sex marriage.

On independence, Regan said that instead of Sturgeon's proposal to use the next Scottish Parliament or House of Commons election as a de facto referendum on Scottish independence, she would begin negotiations with the UK government on independence the next time political parties supporting Scottish independence received more than half of the vote collectively in an election to either parliament. She said she would establish a constitutional convention with other political parties and organisations that support Scottish independence. She described the SNP as having "dismantled the Yes campaign", saying that she wanted campaign groups to have a greater role in determining the route to Scottish independence.

Regan was seen as being close to Salmond's Alba Party: her campaign was run by a Salmond staffer who ran against the SNP as an Alba candidate the year prior, and the only SNP parliamentarian to endorse her is close to Salmond. During the campaign, Regan insisted she had no interest in joining Alba, and would never join that party; despite this, less than six months after coming last in the contest, she defected to Alba, becoming the first MSP ever to directly defect from one party to another.

Regan said she wanted to slow down plans to achieve net zero carbon emissions by phasing out extraction of oil and natural gas from the North Sea. She also committed to finishing the conversion of the A9 and A96 to dual carriageways. Regan was considered the candidate that would represent the biggest change from Sturgeon. She said she would not introduce laws that would "[make] things more difficult for businesses" or "interfere with family life". She said that if elected she would "pause" plans to introduce a national care service and seek more input from stakeholders.

Regan said that Peter Murrell's positions as CEO of the party and Sturgeon's husband constituted a conflict of interest.

In mid-March, Regan said she could give more time to the role if elected leader as she does not have young children, as the other two candidates do.

=== Humza Yousaf ===
The health secretary Humza Yousaf also announced his candidacy on 18 February 2023. He said that he wanted to increase support for Scottish independence before focusing on the means of delivering a referendum and committing to challenging the UK government's decision to block the Gender Recognition Reform (Scotland) Bill. He later said that he would not challenge the decision if legal advice said the challenge would not be won. He said that the rapist Isla Bryson was "pretending to be trans for the sake of making their life easier". He said he wanted to hear from members about options for securing another referendum on Scottish independence, but that he wanted to focus on "policy, because if independence becomes the settled will of the Scottish people then those political obstacles will disappear". He said that he is not "wedded" to using the next general election as a de facto referendum on Scottish independence and that one of the issues would be the inability for 16-year-olds and 17-year-olds to vote. As a leader, he said he would set up workshops with independence campaigners and set up a "rebuttal service" to defend arguments in favour of independence. He said he strongly supported continuing the co-operation agreement with the Scottish Greens.

On 20 February he held a campaign launch in Clydebank, during which he presented himself as a continuity candidate to follow Sturgeon. He was seen as the candidate most aligned with Sturgeon and the party establishment. However, he was criticised for his handling of the NHS in Scotland. Yousaf said that the NHS would have faced the same issues no matter who was health secretary, and highlighted that his negotiations with trade unions had avoided industrial action in Scotland. He said that he would use his approach to pay negotiation in the NHS with every part of the public sector if he became first minister, to try to "make sure we don't have strikes in any industry". As health secretary, Yousaf had proposed a national care service to move social care from local government to a central organisation like the NHS. Various groups had criticised his plan, and as a leadership candidate he said he was willing to make compromises.

He said that if he won the election, he would consider appointing Forbes to his cabinet. Yousaf committed to continue Sturgeon's progressive approach, and said that if Forbes won and became first minister he might turn down an offer to serve in her government if she changed the party's social policy positions towards a more conservative stance. In 2014, Yousaf was absent for the final vote on the Marriage and Civil Partnership (Scotland) Act 2014, citing a ministerial engagement regarding a Scottish prisoner facing capital punishment for blasphemy in Pakistan. He voted for the bill in earlier stages and vocally supported it throughout. The former MSP Alex Neil, who introduced the act, said that Yousaf had deliberately scheduled the meeting to avoid the vote, with permission from Salmond, "because he was put under pressure by the leaders of the mosque in Glasgow". Yousaf said that he consulted his community and "the Muslim community in particular" about many of his positions, and that there were Muslims who had different views on same-sex marriage. He said he did "not remember any conversation with Alex Salmond about the equal marriage vote". Whilst a practicing Muslim, Yousaf said that he does not "legislate on the basis of [his] faith". Salmond repeated the accusation that Yousaf had missed the final vote due to pressure from religious people, which the SNP MP Mhairi Black credited to Salmond's support for Yousaf's rival candidates.

Yousaf said that he wanted to provide twenty-two hours a week of universal free childcare to children aged one and two.

Emma Harper MSP sent an email to party members in support of Yousaf using the SNP's email system. This was against party rules, and Harper apologised. Joanna Cherry MP, who supported Regan, said that the SNP's "party machine" was supporting Yousaf.

Yousaf said his first meeting as first minister, if elected, would be with anti-poverty groups. He said he would consider wealth taxes, windfall taxes and part public ownership of renewable energy. He described himself as a socialist.

=== Hustings ===
The SNP initially planned for its hustings to be for party members only, but this was overturned the following day after criticism.

At the first TV debate on 7 March, Forbes said she would seek the "legal powers to hold a referendum" on independence within three months of the new UK general election. During the first televised debate, Forbes criticised Yousaf's record as a minister, saying that he had failed in all his previous roles. She described the Scottish government as "mediocre". Her words were used by Tory leader Douglas Ross at First Minister's Questions that week, before his party wrote to Forbes asking to use her quotes in their election material the next week.

During hustings at Glenrothes, Forbes proposed a sovereign wealth fund to invest in renewable energy while Yousaf said that he would require a 10% state share of ownership in future renewable schemes.

A Survation poll released on 12 March suggested that the percentage of those who intended to vote SNP at the next general election had fallen to its lowest level in five years, while support for independence had dropped to its lowest level since the autumn of 2018. Prominent pollster John Curtice said the results "strongly suggest" the aggressive attacks by Forbes and Yousaf on each other in the debates had "so far has proven unattractive to voters".

During the hustings on Times Radio on 21 March, Yousaf said that he supported children being taught about gender identity in schools and that there were times that parents should not be informed, citing discussions with a young trans Muslim who told him that his life would have been more difficult if his parents had known he was transitioning. Forbes said that parents should always be involved in decision-making and disputed the language of sex assignment.

=== Row about membership numbers ===
The SNP had originally refused to reveal the number of party members eligible to vote after all three candidates and several SNP parliamentarians called for the number to be published. On 16 March, the party's national executive committee agreed to publish the figure, which was 72,186 as of 15 February. This was down from 104,000 members in 2021.

There had been prior media reports that the party's membership had dropped by around 30,000. Murray Foote, the SNP’s media chief, had described these reports as "inaccurate" and "drivel". In response to the confirmation of the numbers, he said he had been "acting in good faith" with earlier comments, but resigned his position on 17 March. This then led to the SNP's national executive committee giving Peter Murrell, the party's chief executive (and Nicola Sturgeon's husband), an ultimatum as he was blamed for Foote having been misinformed. This led to Murrell's resignation on 18 March.

== Election process ==
The SNP constitution stated that candidates must have the nomination of at least 100 members, from at least 20 branches. Every SNP member who was in the party as of 15 February 2023 was eligible to vote. The election took place on a one member, one vote basis, using a type of single transferable vote.

On 16 February 2023, the party's national executive committee announced the timetable of the election. Nominations opened on 16 February and closed on 24 February. The three nominated candidates were then put forward as options in a ballot of party members, which opened on 13 March, and closed at noon on 27 March, with the result to be announced on the same day by the SNP's national secretary, Lorna Finn. Candidates were given a spending limit of £5,000 and a limit on accepting individual donations of £50, and prohibiting donations from anybody not eligible to vote in the election.

The Times columnist Alex Massie wrote that the short timetable would give an advantage to established candidates. Supporters of Forbes, who was on maternity leave before announcing her candidacy, said that the timeline disadvantaged her.

The SNP approved for candidates to take part in live televised debates.

At the time of the election, the SNP had 72,186 members. The most recent surveys, from 2019, showed the membership was about 58% male, more than in the general, adult population. SNP members were more socially liberal and more left-wing than both SNP supporters and the electorate as a whole.

== Candidates ==
=== Declared ===
Candidate	Political office	Date declared	Campaign	Campaign progression	Ref.
Kate Forbes	Cabinet Secretary for Finance and the Economy (2020–2023); MSP for Skye, Lochaber and Badenoch (2016–present)	20 February 2023	www.kateforbes.scot	Runner up	
Ash Regan	Minister for Community Safety (2018–2022); MSP for Edinburgh Eastern (2016–present)	18 February 2023	voteashregan.com	Eliminated in first round	
Humza Yousaf	Cabinet Secretary for Health and Social Care (2021–2023); Cabinet Secretary for Justice (2018–2021); MSP for Glasgow Pollok (2016–present) and for Glasgow (2011–2016)	18 February 2023	humzayousaf.scot	Elected	

=== Declined ===
The following figures were speculated to be candidates by the media, but declined to run:

- Keith Brown, Depute Leader of the Scottish National Party
- Joanna Cherry, MP for Edinburgh South West (endorsed Regan)
- Stephen Flynn, SNP leader in the House of Commons (endorsed Yousaf)
- Neil Gray, Minister for Culture, Europe and International Development (endorsed Yousaf)
- Màiri McAllan, Minister for Environment, Biodiversity and Land Reform (endorsed Yousaf)
- Angus Robertson, Cabinet Secretary for the Constitution, External Affairs and Culture, former leader of the Scottish National Party in the House of Commons (2007–2017) and Depute Leader of the Scottish National Party (2016–2018) (endorsed Yousaf)
- John Swinney, Deputy First Minister of Scotland, former leader of the Scottish National Party (2000–2004) (endorsed Yousaf)

== Endorsements ==
Endorsements of SNP MSPs (left) & MPs (right) Humza Yousaf Kate Forbes Ash Regan No endorsement Declined to endorse No SNP MSP/MP

=== Kate Forbes ===
Members of the Scottish Parliament

Forbes was endorsed by 11 MSPs:

- Colin Beattie, MSP for Midlothian North and Musselburgh
- Siobhian Brown, MSP for Ayr
- Annabelle Ewing, MSP for Cowdenbeath
- Fergus Ewing, MSP for Inverness and Nairn
- Jim Fairlie, MSP for Perthshire South and Kinross-shire
- Christine Grahame, MSP for Midlothian South, Tweeddale and Lauderdale
- Fulton MacGregor, MSP for Coatbridge and Chryston
- Ruth Maguire, MSP for Cunninghame South
- Ivan McKee, Minister for Business, Trade, Tourism and Enterprise
- Michelle Thomson, MSP for Falkirk East
- David Torrance, MSP for Kirkcaldy

Members of Parliament

Forbes was endorsed by 5 MPs:

- Douglas Chapman, MP for Dunfermline and West Fife
- Martyn Day, MP for Linlithgow and East Falkirk
- Patricia Gibson, MP for North Ayrshire and Arran
- Angus MacNeil, MP for Na h-Eileanan an Iar
- Carol Monaghan, MP for Glasgow North West

Other individuals

- Jim McColl, businessman
- Roger Mullin, former MP for Kirkcaldy and Cowdenbeath
- Alex Neil, former MSP for Airdrie and Shotts and former Scottish Health Secretary
- Alex Salmond, leader of the Alba Party, former First Minister of Scotland and former leader of the SNP (also endorsed Regan)

=== Ash Regan ===
Members of Parliament

Regan was endorsed by 1 MP:

- Joanna Cherry, MP for Edinburgh South West

Other individuals

- Craig Murray, former British ambassador to Uzbekistan, former independent political candidate, and journalist
- Alex Salmond, leader of the Alba Party, former First Minister of Scotland and former leader of the SNP (also endorsed Forbes)

=== Humza Yousaf ===
Members of the Scottish Parliament

Yousaf was endorsed by 33 MSPs:

- Karen Adam, MSP for Banffshire & Buchan Coast
- Clare Adamson, MSP for Motherwell and Wishaw
- Alasdair Allan, MSP for Na h-Eileanan an Iar
- Tom Arthur, Minister for Public Finance, Planning and Community Wealth (previously endorsed Forbes)
- Graeme Dey, MSP for Angus South
- Natalie Don, MSP for Renfrewshire North and West
- Bob Doris, MSP for Glasgow Maryhill and Springburn
- James Dornan, MSP for Glasgow Cathcart
- Jackie Dunbar, MSP for Aberdeen Donside
- Joe FitzPatrick, MSP for Dundee City West
- Jenny Gilruth, Minister for Transport
- Mairi Gougeon, Cabinet Secretary for Rural Affairs and Islands
- Neil Gray, Minister for Culture, Europe and International Development
- Emma Harper, MSP for South Scotland
- Jamie Hepburn, Minister for Higher Education and Further Education, Youth Employment and Training
- Ben Macpherson, Minister for Social Security and Local Government
- Michael Matheson, Cabinet Secretary for Net Zero, Energy and Transport
- Màiri McAllan, Minister for Environment, Biodiversity and Land Reform
- Christina McKelvie, Minister for Equalities and Older People
- Paul McLennan, MSP for East Lothian
- Marie McNair, MSP for Clydebank and Milngavie
- Jenni Minto, MSP for Argyll and Bute
- Audrey Nicoll, MSP for Aberdeen South and North Kincardine
- Angus Robertson, Cabinet Secretary for the Constitution, External Affairs and Culture
- Shona Robison, Cabinet Secretary for Social Justice, Housing and Local Government
- Emma Roddick, MSP for Highlands and Islands
- Shirley-Anne Somerville, Cabinet Secretary for Education and Skills
- Collette Stevenson, MSP for East Kilbride
- Kaukab Stewart, MSP for Glasgow Kelvin
- Kevin Stewart, Minister for Mental Wellbeing and Social Care
- John Swinney, outgoing Deputy First Minister of Scotland and former leader of the SNP
- Maree Todd, Minister for Public Health, Women's Health and Sport
- Elena Whitham, Minister for Community Safety

Members of Parliament

Yousaf was endorsed by 18 MPs:

- Mhairi Black, MP for Paisley and Renfrewshire South
- Ian Blackford, MP for Ross, Skye, and Lochaber and former SNP Westminster leader
- Kirsty Blackman, MP for Aberdeen North
- Deidre Brock, MP for Edinburgh North and Leith
- Amy Callaghan, MP for East Dunbartonshire
- Angela Crawley, MP for Lanark and Hamilton East
- Martin Docherty-Hughes, MP for West Dunbartonshire
- Stephen Flynn, MP for Aberdeen South and SNP Westminster leader
- Stewart Hosie, MP for Dundee East
- Chris Law, MP for Dundee West
- Stuart McDonald, MP for Cumbernauld, Kilsyth and Kirkintilloch East
- Anne McLaughlin, MP for Glasgow North East
- Anum Qaisar, MP for Airdrie and Shotts
- Tommy Sheppard, MP for Edinburgh East
- Chris Stephens, MP for Glasgow South West
- Alison Thewliss, MP for Glasgow Central
- Owen Thompson, MP for Midlothian
- Pete Wishart, MP for Perth and North Perthshire

Other individuals

- Susan Aitken, leader of Glasgow City Council
- John Alexander, leader of Dundee City Council
- Bruce Crawford, former MSP for Stirling
- Alan Cumming, actor
- Sandra White, former MSP for Glasgow Kelvin

=== Declined to endorse ===
- Keith Brown, depute leader of the SNP
- John Mason, MSP for Glasgow Shettleston
- Stuart McMillan, MSP for Greenock and Inverclyde
- Nicola Sturgeon, outgoing leader of the SNP

== Debates ==
No.	Date and time	Location	Programme	Broadcaster	Presenter(s)	Candidates			Ref.
P Participant O Out of race (eliminated or withdrawn) H Debate halted N No debate I Invited						Forbes	Regan	Yousaf	Ref.
1	7 March 2023, 9.00pm	Pacific Quay, Glasgow	Scotland’s Next First Minister: The STV Debate	STV	Colin Mackay	P	P	P	
2	9 March 2023, 7.00pm	SWG3, Glasgow	Scotland's Next Leader	Channel 4 News	Krishnan Guru-Murthy	P	P	P	
3	13 March 2023, 7.00pm	Hopetoun House, Edinburgh	Scotland Leadership Debate	Sky News	Beth Rigby	P	P	P	
4	14 March 2023, 8.00pm	Mansfield Traquair, Edinburgh	The Debate Night Leadership Special	BBC Scotland	Stephen Jardine	P	P	P	
5	17 March 2023, 7.20pm	Kings Inverness, Inverness	Inverness Courier Leadership Debate	The Inverness Courier (online)	Nicky Marr	P	P	P	
6	20 March 2023, 7.00pm	Global Studios, Glasgow	The SNP Leadership Debate	LBC (online)	Iain Dale	P	P	P	
7	21 March 2023, 8.00pm	Edinburgh	SNP Leadership Debate	Times Radio (online)	Aasmah Mir	P	P	P	

== Hustings ==
Locations of the hustings

Nine hustings were announced on 24 February 2023, including one to be held online on 5 March 2023. The hustings were live streamed on the SNP's social media channels.

Date	Location	Venue	Moderator
1 March	Cumbernauld	Cumbernauld Theatre	Mike Russell
3 March	Glenrothes	Rothes Hall	Mike Russell
4 March	Inverness	Eden Court	Mike Russell
6 March	Dumfries	Easterbrook Hall	Kelly Parry
8 March	Johnstone	Johnstone Town Hall	Jeane Freeman
10 March	Edinburgh	Corn Exchange	Keith Brown
11 March	Glasgow	University of Strathclyde	Mike Russell
11 March	Glasgow	Scottish Trades Union Congress	Roz Foyer
12 March	Aberdeen	Tivoli Theatre	Kelly Parry

== Opinion polling ==
=== SNP membership ===
Dates conducted	Pollster	Client	Sample size	Kate Forbes	Ash Regan	Humza Yousaf	Don't know/ NOTA
23 Feb – 1 Mar	Savanta	The Telegraph	515	25%	11%	31%	32%

=== 2021 SNP voters ===
Dates conducted	Pollster	Client	Sample size	Kate Forbes	Ash Regan	Humza Yousaf	Don't know/ NOTA
20–22 Feb	The Big Partnership	N/A	1,001 (Note: 45% of the sample voted for the SNP on both the constituency and list votes at the 2021 election)	28%	7%	20%	45%

=== Scottish public ===
Dates conducted	Pollster	Client	Sample size	Kate Forbes	Ash Regan	Humza Yousaf	Others	Don't know/ NOTA
7–10 Mar	Panelbase	Scot Goes Pop	1,013	33%	10%	18%	—N/a	36%
6–7 Mar	Ipsos	Channel 4 News	1,503	32%	8%	24%	—N/a	35%
2–5 Mar	Redfield & Wilton	N/A	1,050	25%	14%	18%	—N/a	44%
24 Feb	Nominations close							
21–24 Feb	Panelbase	The Sunday Times	1,026	23%	7%	15%	—N/a	49%
20 Feb	Kate Forbes announces her bid to be SNP leader							
17–20 Feb	YouGov	The Times	1,017	10%	2%	5%	29% Keith Brown on 1% Neil Gray on 0% Màiri McAllan on 2% Angus Robertson on 7% Others on 19%	54%
18 Feb	Ash Regan and Humza Yousaf announce their bids to be SNP leader							
15–17 Feb	Savanta	The Scotsman	1,004	14%	—N/a	6%	31% Keith Brown on 1% Mairi Gougeon on 3% Neil Gray on 2% Angus Robertson on 9% Shona Robison on 2% Shirley-Anne Somerville on 1% John Swinney on 9% Others on 4%	50%
15 Feb	Nicola Sturgeon announces her resignation as leader of the SNP and as First Minister							
6–10 Feb	Panelbase	N/A	1,415	7%	—N/a	—N/a	31% Keith Brown on 2% Stephen Flynn on 3% Neil Gray on 1% Màiri McAllan on 3% Angus Robertson on 5% John Swinney on 6% Others on 4%	69%

== Results ==
Humza Yousaf won with 52% in the second round of the ranked voting system, with Kate Forbes coming second. Regan came third and was eliminated after the first round, and so the second preferences of Regan voters were distributed to Yousaf and Forbes in the second round.

50,494 ballot papers were received from 72,169 members, a turnout of 69.97%. There were 48,645 votes cast electronically and 1,849 by post. There were 3 rejected postal ballot papers.

Candidate	First preferences	%	Final result	%
Humza Yousaf	24,336	48.2%	26,032	52.1%
Kate Forbes	20,559	40.7%	23,890	47.9%
Ash Regan	5,599	11.1%	Eliminated	
No further preferences	N/A		572	
Total	50,494	100%	50,494	100%

=== Preference votes by candidate ===
First preference candidate	Second preferences			
First preference candidate	Yousaf %	Forbes %	Regan %	No further preferences %
Humza Yousaf	N/A	37.7%	22.2%	40.1%
Kate Forbes	46.6%	N/A	36.8%	16.6%
Ash Regan	30.3%	59.5%	N/A	10.2%

== Aftermath ==
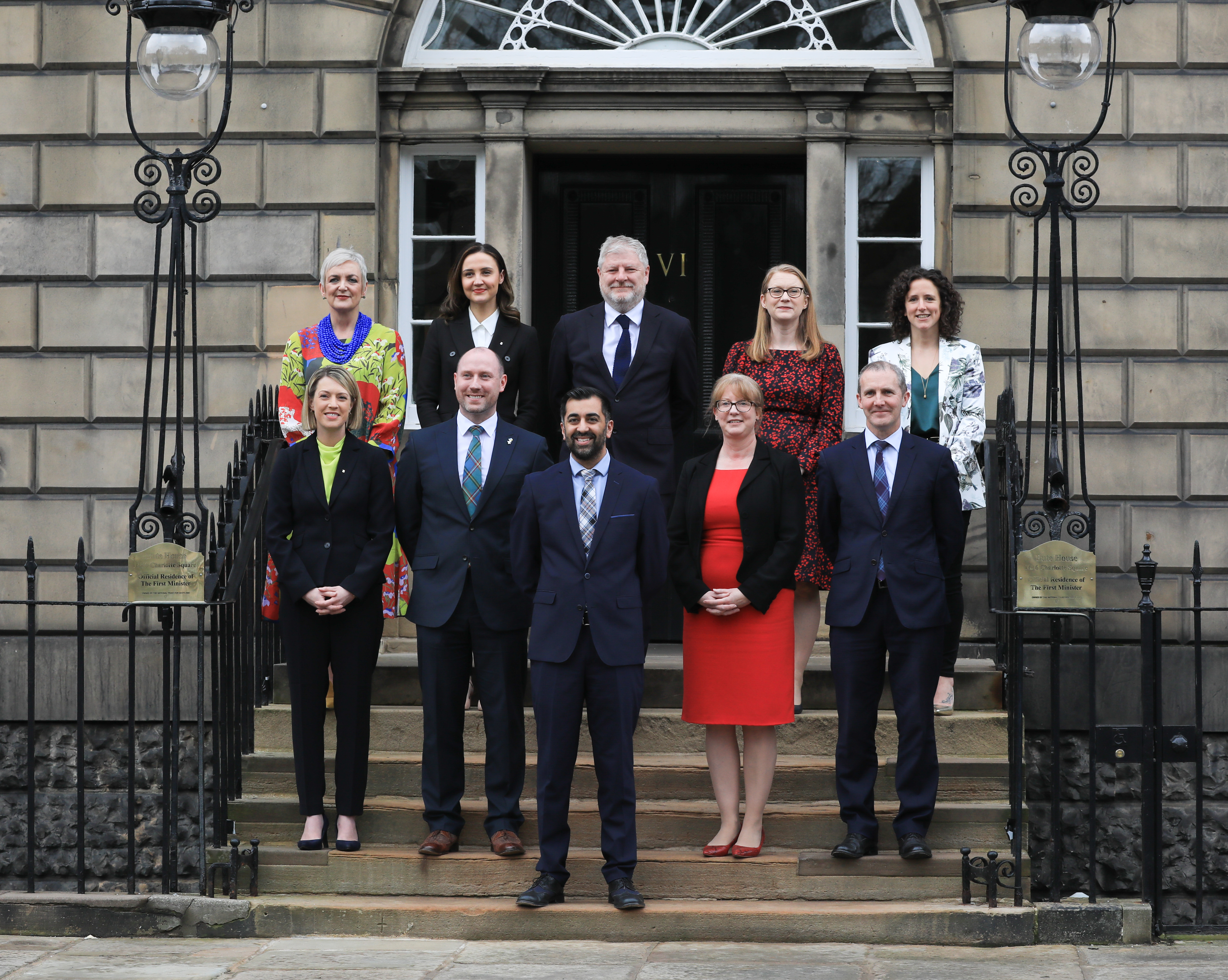
Yousaf's cabinet did not have any MSPs who had supported Forbes in the election.

Severin Carrell and Lucy Forbes, writing in The Guardian, reported that the contest had exposed deep divisions within the party. Yousaf's win was described as "razor-thin" by the BBC. He stressed party unity in his victory speech.

The Scottish Green Party said they would support Yousaf becoming First Minister. He was elected as the first minister on 28 March 2023, becoming the first person of colour and first Muslim to serve as first minister since the post was created in 1999.

Yousaf offered Forbes the rural affairs brief in his new cabinet. Forbes declined and exited government. Yousaf did not appoint any MSPs who had endorsed Forbes to the government.

Regan defected from the SNP to join the Alba Party in October 2023, seven months after the contest. In April 2024, she said she had not spoken to Yousaf since the contest results.

On 29 April 2024, Yousaf announced his resignation as First Minister, triggering a new leadership election.
