= Midlothian East (ward) =

Location of the ward

Midlothian East is one of the six wards used to elect members of the Midlothian Council. It elects three Councillors.

== Councillors ==
Election	Councillors		
2007	Lisa Beattie (SNP)	Peter Boyes (Labour)	Katie Moffat (Liberal Democrats)
2012	Lisa Beattie (SNP)	Peter Boyes (Labour)	Peter de Vink (Ind.)
2014 by	Lisa Beattie (SNP)	Kenny Young (Labour)	Peter de Vink (Ind.)
2017	Kenneth Baird (SNP)	John Hackett (Labour)	Peter Smaill (Conservative)
2022	Stuart Douglas McKenzie (SNP)	Bryan Pottinger (Labour)	Peter Smaill (Conservative)

== Election results ==
=== 2021 By-election ===
Midlothian East By-election (25 March 2021) - 1 Seat
Party	Candidate	FPv%	Count			
Party	Candidate	FPv%	1	2	3	4
SNP	Stuart McKenzie	35.38%	1,538	1,547	1,662	1,963
Conservative	Alan Symon	29.42%	1,279	1,326	1,364	1,656
Labour	Hazel Flanagan	24.61%	1,070	1,114	1,222	
Green	Joy Hannah Godfrey	6.49%	282	332		
Liberal Democrats	Margaret Louise Davis	4.09%	178			
Electorate: 12,052 Valid: 4,347 Spoilt: 21 Quota: 2,174 Turnout: 4,368 (35.8%)

=== 2017 Election ===
2017 Midlothian Council election

Midlothian East - 3 seats
Party	Candidate	FPv%	Count			
Party	Candidate	FPv%	1	2	3	4
Conservative	Peter Smaill	26.9	1,522			
Labour	John Hackett	22.7	1,284	1,314.3	1,387.5	1,431.6
Independent	Robert Hogg	18.8	1,064	1,098.0	1,169.1	1,210.2
SNP	Kenneth Baird	15.4	872	873.1	928.1	1,485.8
SNP	Louise D'Arcy-Greig	10.8	609	610.4	677.4	
Green	Helen Armstrong	5.3	301	309.1		
Electorate: TBC Valid: 5,652 Spoilt: 68 Quota: 1,414 Turnout: 48.3%

=== 2014 By-election ===
Midlothian East By-election (27 November 2014) - 1 Seat
Party	Candidate	FPv%	Count				
Party	Candidate	FPv%	1	2	3	4	5
Labour	Kenny Young	32.9%	1,294	1,310	1,343	1,443	1,682
SNP	Colin Cassidy	32.1%	1,260	1,270	1,357	1,384	1,613
Independent	Robert Hogg	19.8%	780	789	831	914	
Conservative	Andrew Hardie	8.4%	331	342	359		
Green	Bill Kerr-Smith	5.0%	197	210			
Liberal Democrats	Euan Davidson	1.7%	68				
Electorate: 11,637 Valid: 3,930 Spoilt: 40 Quota: 1,966 Turnout: 3,970 (34.1%)

=== 2012 Election ===
2012 Midlothian Council election

Midlothian East - 3 seats
Party	Candidate	FPv%	Count						
Party	Candidate	FPv%	1	2	3	4	5	6	7
SNP	Lisa Beattie (incumbent)	33.1	1,372						
Labour	Peter Boyes (incumbent) †	24.2	1,003	1,015.5	1,020.5	1,036.7	1,048.6		
Labour	Katie Moffat (incumbent)	11.5	475	486.9	493.2	525.7			
Independent	Peter de Vink	11.1	461	484.9	503.4	686.3	737.8	800.9	1014.3
SNP	Paul Bertram	9.8	405	656.9	665.9	689.4	721.1	781.7	
Conservative	Richard Thomson	9.1	379	388.3	388.3				
TUSC	Bob Goupillot	1.3	52	54.2					
Electorate: 10,409 Valid: 4,147 Spoilt: 78 Quota: 1,037 Turnout: 4,225 (39.84%)

=== 2007 Election ===
2007 Midlothian Council election

Midlothian council election, 2007: Midlothian East
Party	Candidate	FPv%	%	Seat	Count
SNP	Lisa Beattie	1,988	34.6	1	1
Labour	Peter Boyes	1,357	23.6	2	4
Liberal Democrats	Katie Moffat†	831	14.5	3	7
Conservative	Robin Traquair	812	14.1		
Labour	Bob Jenkins	617	10.7		
Solidarity	Derek Duncan	82	1.4		
Scottish Socialist	Murray Court	63	1.1		
