= Midlothian West (ward) =

Electoral ward in Midlothian, Scotland

Location of the ward

Midlothian West is one of the six wards used to elect members of the Midlothian Council. It elects three Councillors.

== Councillors ==
Election	Councillors		
2007	Owen Thompson (SNP)	Russell Imrie (Labour)	Les Thacker (Liberal Democrats)
2012	Owen Thompson (SNP)	Russell Imrie (Labour)	Andrew Coventry (SNP)
2015 by	Kelly Parry (SNP)	Russell Imrie (Labour)	Andrew Coventry (SNP)
2017	Kelly Parry (SNP)	Russell Imrie (Labour)	Pauline Winchester (Conservative)
2022	Kelly Parry (SNP)	Russell Imrie (Labour)	Pauline Winchester (Conservative)

== Election results ==
=== 2017 Election ===
2017 Midlothian Council election

Midlothian West - 3 seats
Party	Candidate	FPv%	Count						
Party	Candidate	FPv%	1	2	3	4	5	6	7
Conservative	Pauline Winchester	26.9	1,503						
SNP	Kelly Parry (incumbent)	19.5	1,091	1,092.0	1,106.3	1,159.7	1,679.7		
Labour	Russell Imrie (incumbent)	12.2	684	698.8	737.5	817.0	837.3	867.9	1,443.5
Labour	Stephen Blain	11.0	612	620.1	650.1	700.2	707.3	724.1	
SNP	David Temple	10.4	581	582.7	587.7	616.9			
Green	Helen Blackburn	8.4	468	473.4	552.3	680.8	715.9	835.8	889.4
Independent	Andrew Coventry (incumbent)	7.4	413	435.8	484.2				
Liberal Democrats	Ross Laird	4.2	236	256.6					
Electorate: TBC Valid: 5,588 Spoilt: 91 Quota: 1,398 Turnout: 47.2%

=== 2015 By-election ===
Midlothian West By-election (10 September 2015) - 1 Seat
Party	Candidate	FPv%	Count		
Party	Candidate	FPv%	1	2	3
SNP	Kelly Parry	43.2%	1,540	1,558	1,701
Labour	Ian Miller	26.5%	945	977	1,082
Conservative	Pauline Winchester	14.7%	524	570	618
Green	Daya Feldwick	10.4%	372	420	
Liberal Democrats	Jane Davidson	4.5%	162		
Independent	David Tedford	0.7%	25		
Electorate: 11,582 Valid: 3,568 Spoilt: 49 Quota: 1,785 Turnout: 3,617 (31.2%)

=== 2012 Election ===
2012 Midlothian Council election

Midlothian West - 3 seats
Party	Candidate	FPv%	Count						
Party	Candidate	FPv%	1	2	3	4	5	6	7
SNP	Andrew Coventry	21.5	930	935	943	987	1,017	1,071	1,106
SNP	Owen Thompson (incumbent)††	18.20	789	793	805	832	861	900	960
Labour	Russell Imrie (incumbent)	17.9	776	778	784	823	872	966	1,595
Labour	Alex Jones	17.58	762	764	773	794	821	856	
Conservative	Andrew Hardie	10.7	462	480	497	567			
Liberal Democrats	Les Thacker (incumbent)	5.67	246	247	263	309			
Green	Helen Blackburn	5.2	226	234	258				
Independent	George McCleery	2.38	103	115					
TUSC	Lynn Leitch	0.95	41						
Electorate: 10,714 Valid: 4,335 Spoilt: 54 Quota: 1,084 Turnout: 4,389 (40.46%)

=== 2007 Election ===
2007 Midlothian Council election

Midlothian council election, 2007: Midlothian West
Party	Candidate	FPv%	%	Seat	Count
SNP	Owen Thompson	1,981	33.2	1	1
Labour	Russell Imrie	1,506	25.2	2	1
Liberal Democrats	Les Thacker	868	14.5	3	10
Conservative	Andrew Hardie	634	10.6		
Independent	Elizabeth Veitch	259	4.3		
Independent	George Purcell	220	3.7		
Independent	Pat Kenny	188	3.2		
Scottish Socialist	Lynn Leitch	108	1.8		
Had Enough	George McCleery	105	1.8		
Solidarity	Brian Cranston	99	1.7		
