= Kelly Parry =

Leader of Midlothian Council

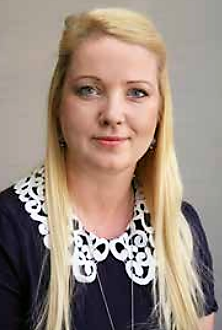

Leader of Midlothian Council
- Incumbent
- Assumed office 24 May 2022
- Preceded by: Derek Milligan

Personal details
- Party: Scottish National Party
- Children: 2
- Education: Jewel and Esk College; The Open University

Kelly Marie Parry is a Scottish politician serving as the leader of the Midlothian Council since 2022. A member of the Scottish National Party (SNP), she has been a councillor, representing the Midlothian West ward since 2015.

== Early life ==
Parry attended St David's High School in Dalkeith. She studied HND Business and HNC Social Science at Jewel and Esk College (now part of the Edinburgh College) from 2007 to 2009, before studying Social Policy and Criminology at the Open University from 2012 to 2016.

Parry worked as a branch manager at the Post Office. She was a President of the Edinburgh College Students' Association and later was a Student Funding Policy Officer. Parry worked as a Funding Policy Officer for the Scottish Funding Council for Further and Higher Education.

== Political career ==
Following the 2014 Scottish independence referendum campaign, Parry was motivated to get into local politics. After Owen Thompson stood down from Midlothian Council following his election to the British House of Commons in the 2015 general election, a by-election for the Midlothian ward was held. Parry was successfully elected to succeed Thompson after securing 43.2% of first preference votes.

She has been the Community Wellbeing Spokesperson for the Convention of Scottish Local Authorities (COSLA) since June 2017.

Parry led the SNP's national campaign in the 2022 Scottish local elections. On 7 May 2022, she was appointed SNP Group Leader in Midlothian Council, succeeding Colin Cassidy, who was appointed Deputy SNP Group Leader.

On 24 May 2022, the SNP group announced that it had secured support to run a minority administration in Midlothian. Parry was elected leader of the council with Debbi McCall serving as provost.

She was named in February 2026 as a party list candidate for the Edinburgh and Lothians East electoral region for the 2026 Scottish Parliament election, but did not appear in the final list of confirmed candidates in April 2026.

== Personal life ==
Parry is a mother of two.
