= 2022 Midlothian Council election =

2022 Scottish local government election

- 5 May 2022

All 18 seats to Midlothian Council 10 seats needed for a majority
- Registered: 75,636
- Turnout: 42.4%
	First party	Second party	Third party
Leader	Kelly Parry	Derek Milligan	Peter Smaill
Party	SNP	Labour	Conservative
Leader's seat	Midlothian West	Bonnyrigg	Midlothian East
Last election	6 seats, 30.7%	7 seats, 30.2%	5 seats, 22.7%
Seats before	7	6	5
Seats won	8	7	3
Seat change	▲2	Steady	▼2
Popular vote	11,844	10,575	5,270
Percentage	37.6%	33.5%	16.7%
Swing	▲6.9%	▲3.3%	▼6.0%
- Results by ward
Council Leader before election
Derek Milligan
Labour
Council Leader after election
Kelly Parry
SNP

Elections to Midlothian Council took place on 5 May 2022 as part of the 2022 Scottish local elections. The election used the six wards created under the Local Governance (Scotland) Act 2004, with 18 councillors being elected. Each ward elected three members, using the STV electoral system - a form of proportional representation.

For the first time, the Scottish National Party emerged as the largest party on the council with eight seats, with Labour winning seven and the Conservatives three.

== Background ==
=== Previous election ===
At the previous election in 2017, the Labour party won the most seats at 7, closely followed by the SNP and the Conservatives, with 6 & 5 respectively. The Conservatives increased their vote share by over 14%, while Labour and the SNP dropped sharply in vote share, with 9.3%, and 8.8% drops respectively.

2017 Midlothian Council election result
Party	Seats	Vote share
Labour	7	30.2%
SNP	6	30.7%
Conservatives	5	22.7%

=== Electoral system ===
The election used the 6 wards created following the fifth statutory review of electoral arrangements conducted by Local Government Boundary Commission for Scotland in 2016, with 18 councillors elected. Each ward elected either three or four councillors, using the single transferable vote (STV) electoral system – a form of proportional representation – where candidates are ranked in order of preference.

== Results ==
2022 Midlothian Council election
Party	Seats	Gains	Losses	Net gain/loss	Seats %	Votes %	Votes	+/−
SNP	8	2	0	▲2	44.4	37.6	11,844	▲6.9
Labour	7	0	0	Steady	38.9	33.5	10,575	▲3.3
Conservative	3	0	2	▼2	16.7	16.7	5,270	▼6.0
Green	0	0	0	Steady	0.0	5.3	2,542	▼1.6
Liberal Democrats	0	0	0	Steady	0.0	4.8	1,025	▲2.8
Alba	0	0	0	Steady	0.0	0.7	220	New
Scottish Libertarian	0	0	0	Steady	0.0	0.2	58	New
Total	18						31,534	

== Ward results ==
=== Penicuik ===
- 2017: 1xCon; 1xSNP; 1xLab
- 2022: 2xSNP; 1xLab
- 2017-2022: 1 SNP gain from Con

Penicuik - 3 seats
Party	Candidate	FPv%	Count						
Party	Candidate	FPv%	1	2	3	4	5	6	7
SNP	Debbi McCall (incumbent)	31.8	1,639						
Labour	Willie McEwan	23.9	1,234	1,261	1,268	1,418			
Conservative	Richard Thomson	17.7	912	917	923	1,003	1,037	1,073	
SNP	Connor McManus	11.4	589	857	869	889	904	1,159	1,276
Green	Helen Armstrong	7.4	383	409	416	482	508		
Liberal Democrats	Ken Brown	6.8	351	356	364				
Alba	George Boyd	0.8	46	46					
Electorate: 11,133 Valid: 5,154 Spoilt: 88 Quota: 1,289 Turnout: 47.1%

=== Bonnyrigg ===
- 2017: 1xLab; 1xSNP; 1xCon
- 2022: 1xLab; 1xSNP; 1xCon
- 2017-2022 Change: No change

Bonnyrigg - 3 seats
Party	Candidate	FPv%	Count			
Party	Candidate	FPv%	1	2	3	4
Labour	Derek Milligan (incumbent)	40.4	2,428			
SNP	Dianne Alexander	35.2	2,117			
Conservative	David Virgo	23.5	1,012	1,299	1,323	1,720
Green	Daya Feldwick	7.6	459	735	1,155	
Electorate: 14,239 Valid: 6,016 Spoilt: 57 Quota: 1,505 Turnout: 48.5%

=== Dalkeith ===
- 2017: 2xLab; 1xSNP
- 2022: 2xLab; 1xSNP
- 2017-2022 Change: No change

Dalkeith - 3 seats
Party	Candidate	FPv%	Count					
Party	Candidate	FPv%	1	2	3	4	5	6
Labour	Stephen Curran (incumbent)	27.0	1,163					
SNP	Colin Cassidy (incumbent)	23.5	1,012	1,017	1,035	1,133		
Labour	Margot Russell (incumbent)	18.6	800	881	894	953	956	1,199
SNP	Karen Green	11.6	501	503	508	602	648	663
Conservative	Mark Wells	10.7	459	462	464	482	483	
Green	Marion Black	6.9	299	301	311			
Alba	Jamie Bryant	1.6	56	56				
Electorate: 11,594 Valid: 4,306 Spoilt: 117 Quota: 1,077 Turnout: 38.1%

=== Midlothian West ===
- 2017: 1xCon; 1xSNP; 1xLab
- 2022: 1xCon; 1xSNP; 1xLab
- 2017-2022 Change: No change

Midlothian West - 3 seats
Party	Candidate	FPv%	Count					
Party	Candidate	FPv%	1	2	3	4	5	6
Labour	Russell Imrie (incumbent)	26.7	1,645					
SNP	Pat Kenny	18.7	1,149	1,158	1,176	1,206	1,370	
Conservative	Pauline Winchester (incumbent)	18.6	1,144	1,161	1,167	1,323	1,386	1,397
SNP	Kelly Parry (incumbent)	18.3	1,126	1,131	1,143	1,159	1,449	2,643
Green	Jill Simon	10.1	624	636	649	773		
Liberal Democrats	Richard Chandler	6.5	400	431	441			
Alba	Andrew Coventry	1.2	74	76				
Electorate: 13,917 Valid: 6,162 Spoilt: 105 Quota: 1,541 Turnout: 45.0%

=== Midlothian East ===
- 2017: 1xCon; 1xSNP; 1xLab
- 2022: 1xCon; 1xSNP; 1xLab
- 2017-2022 Change: No change

Midlothian East - 3 seats
Party	Candidate	FPv%	Count				
Party	Candidate	FPv%	1	2	3	4	5
Labour	Bryan Pottinger	29.8	1,473				
Conservative	Peter Smaill (incumbent)	22.4	1,106	1,153	1,255		
SNP	Stuart McKenzie (incumbent)	21.2	1,045	1,060	1,079	1,080	1,254
SNP	Ann Montague	12.5	616	634	657	658	805
Green	Bill Kerr-Smith	8.7	428	456	575	578	
Liberal Democrats	Jenny Marr	5.5	274	336			
Electorate: 12,229 Valid: 4,942 Spoilt: 58 Quota: 1,236 Turnout: 40.9%

=== Midlothian South ===
- 2017: 1xLab; 1xSNP; 1xCon
- 2022: 2xSNP; 1xLab
- 2017-2022 Change: 1 SNP gain from Con

Midlothian South - 3 seats
Party	Candidate	FPv%	Count						
Party	Candidate	FPv%	1	2	3	4	5	6	7
Labour	Kelly Drummond (incumbent)	25.1	1,243						
SNP	Ellen Scott	21.1	1,045	1,045	1,051	1,053	1,185	1,206	1,345
SNP	Douglas Bowen	20.3	1,005	1,005	1,013	1,018	1,072	1,097	1,223
Conservative	Robin Stenhouse	12.9	637	637	642	658	678		
Labour	Hazel Flanagan	11.6	573	576	579	588	680	999	
Green	Malcolm Spaven	7.0	349	349	356	370			
Scottish Libertarian	Daniel Fraser	1.2	58	58	63				
Alba	Christopher Hampton	0.9	44	44					
Electorate: 12,524 Valid: 4,954 Spoilt: 120 Quota: 1,239 Turnout: 40.5%

== Aftermath ==
On 24 May, the SNP group announced that it had secured support to run a minority administration in Midlothian. Kelly Parry was elected leader of the council with Debbi McCall serving as provost.
