= 1977 Midlothian District Council election =

District council election in 1977

The 1977 Midlothian District Council Election was held in May 1977, the same day as the other Scottish local government elections. This was the second election for the Midlothian District Council, and constituted the only time in the District Council's 21-year existence that Labour failed to win a majority of the seats. It would take 30 years, until the 2007 Midlothian Council election and the introduction of the use of STV in local elections, for the SNP to win as many councillors again in Midlothian.

In the ward of Bonnyrigg South, the SNP and Labour candidates tied for votes. As a result, the winner was decided by means of drawing cards. Robert Mathieson, the Labour candidate, drew a 10 of Diamonds, losing the seat to the SNP's Francis Rigby, who drew an Ace of Diamonds. With the loss of Bonnyrigg South, Labour were left with only 7 of the councils 15 seats, losing them control of the council.

== Election results ==
Midlothian local election result 1977
Party	Seats	Gains	Losses	Net gain/loss	Seats %	Votes %	Votes	+/−
Labour	7			▼4		41.4	9,286	▼8.8
SNP	5			▲4		30.5	6,844	▲15.7
Conservative	2			0		20.3	4,548	▲3.6
Independent	1			0		4.9	1,097	▼13.0
Communist	0	0	0	N/A	0.0	0.7	164	New
Liberal	0	0	0	N/A	0.0	0.4	99	New
Other parties	0	0	0	0	0.0	1.7	372	
