= Danielle Rowley =

British Labour politician

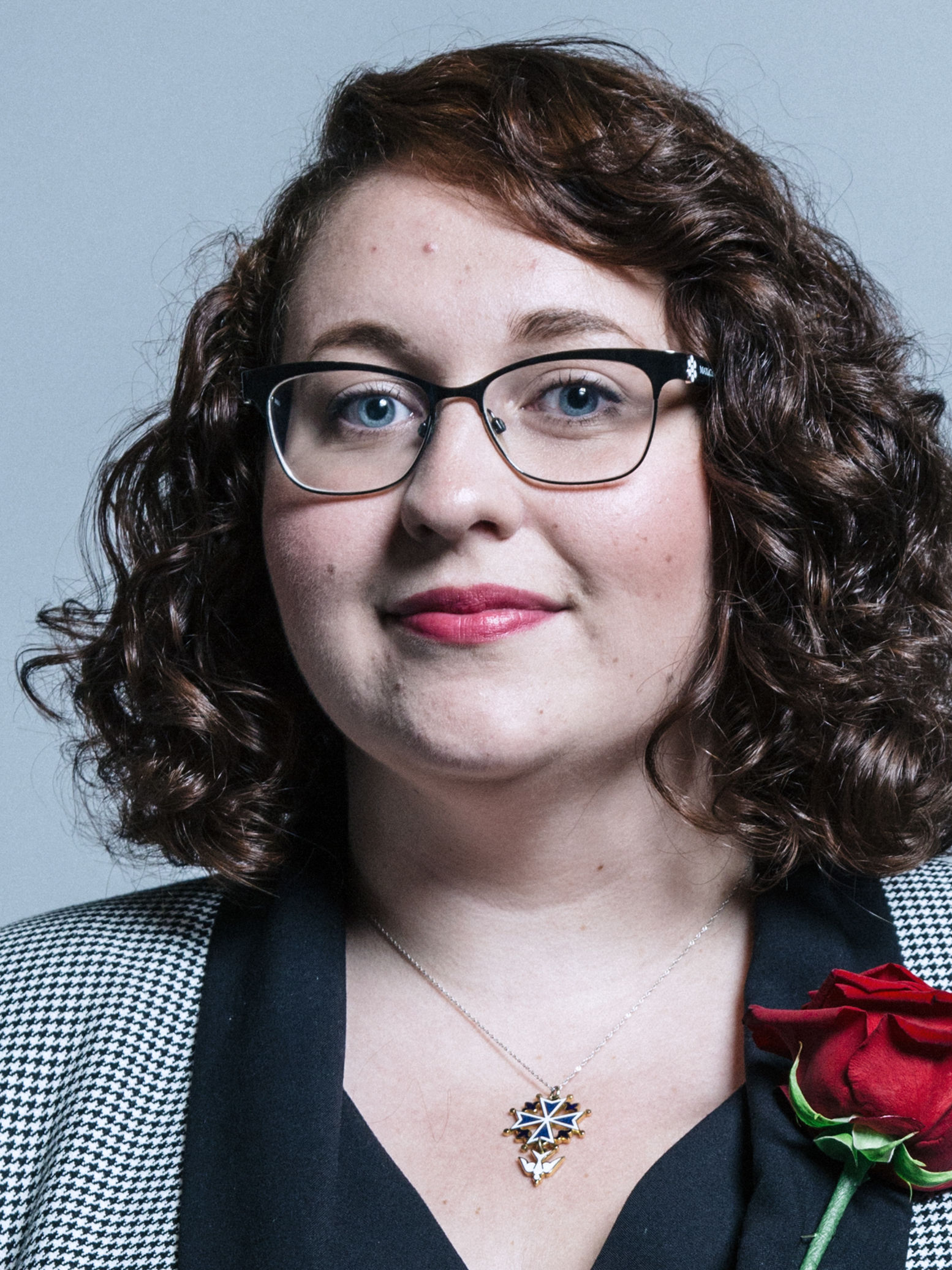
- Official portrait, 2017

Shadow Minister for Climate Justice and Green Jobs
- In office 21 June 2019 – 12 December 2019
- Leader: Jeremy Corbyn
- Preceded by: Position established
- Succeeded by: Position abolished

Member of Parliament for Midlothian
- In office 8 June 2017 – 6 November 2019
- Preceded by: Owen Thompson
- Succeeded by: Owen Thompson

Personal details
- Born: Danielle Rowley; 25 February 1990 (age 36) Dalkeith, Scotland
- Party: Labour
- Children: 1
- Parent: Alex Rowley (father)
- Education: Edinburgh Napier University

Danielle Rowley (born 25 February 1990) is a Scottish Labour politician who served as Member of Parliament (MP) for Midlothian from 2017 to 2019.

== Early life and education ==
Danielle Rowley was born on 25 February 1990 and grew up on a council estate in Dalkeith. Her father is Scottish Labour politician Alex Rowley and her late mother was a trade unionist. Both her grandfathers were Labour Party activists and miners. She was educated at Dalkeith High School and graduated from Edinburgh Napier University with a journalism degree in 2014. Rowley supported Scotland staying part of the union during the 2014 Scottish independence referendum, and worked as former Prime Minister Gordon Brown's constituency media manager during the campaign.

Before her election to parliament, Rowley worked as the Campaigns and Public Relations Officer for housing charity Shelter Scotland and was also a Member of the Scottish Youth Parliament.

== Parliamentary career ==
Rowley was selected in April 2017 as the official Labour Party candidate, for the Midlothian constituency at the snap general election held on 8 June. She went on to be elected as the Member of Parliament for the constituency with a majority of 885 votes over the sitting Scottish National party MP Owen Thompson. Rowley was the first female MP to represent Midlothian. In her maiden speech in the House of Commons in July 2017, she commented that she would fight to reduce the need of food banks in her constituency. Shortly after her election, Rowley was appointed as Parliamentary Private Secretary to Shadow Foreign Secretary Emily Thornberry. She sat on the Scottish Affairs Select Committee from September 2017 to November 2019.

She chaired Richard Leonard's successful 2017 Scottish Labour leadership campaign to become Leader of the Scottish Labour Party, following Kezia Dugdale's decision to resign.

Rowley supported the United Kingdom (UK) remaining within the European Union (EU) in the 2016 UK EU membership referendum. In the indicative votes on 27 March 2019, she voted for a referendum on a Brexit withdrawal agreement, for the Norway-plus model, and for a customs union with the EU.

On 21 June 2019, Rowley was appointed as Shadow Minister for Climate Justice and Green Jobs, a new role. At the 2019 United Kingdom general election, Rowley lost her seat to Scottish National Party candidate Owen Thompson by a majority of 5,705. Thompson had previously held the seat from 2015 to 2017.

During the 2020 Labour leadership election, Rowley managed Emily Thornberry's unsuccessful campaign.

In 2021, Rowley became the Head of Policy & Communications at the Scottish branch of the charity Samaritans. Rowley continues to be vocal about issues such as poverty, speaking on panels, writing in the media and has appeared on podcasts.

== Personal life ==
Rowley has attention deficit hyperactivity disorder. In January 2021, she had a son.

Parliament of the United Kingdom
Preceded by Owen Thompson	Member of Parliament for Midlothian; 2017–2019	Succeeded by Owen Thompson
