= Penicuik (ward) =

Electoral ward in Midlothian, Scotland

Location of the ward

Penicuik is one of the six wards used to elect members of the Midlothian Council. It elects three councillors.

== Councillors ==
Election	Councillors		
2007	Margaret Wilson (SNP)	Adam Montgomery (Labour)	Ken Brown (Liberal Democrats)
2012	Derek George Rosie (SNP)	Adam Montgomery (Labour)	Joe Wallace (SNP)
2017	Debbi McCall (SNP)	Adam Montgomery (Labour)	Andrew Hardie (Conservative)
2018 by	Debbi McCall (SNP)	Joe Wallace (SNP)	Andrew Hardie (Conservative)
2022	Debbi McCall (SNP)	Connor McManus (SNP)	Willie McEwan (Labour)

== Election results ==
=== 2018 by-election ===
Penicuik By-election (22 March 2018)
Party	Candidate	FPv%	Count		
Party	Candidate	FPv%	1	2	3
SNP	Joe Wallace	35.0	1,663	1,803	2,307
Conservative	Murdo MacDonald	30.2	1,433	1,469	1,788
Labour	Vivienne Wallace	27.6	1,310	1,414	
Green	Helen Armstrong	7.2	344		
Electorate: TBC Valid: 4,781 Spoilt: 31 Quota: 2,376 Turnout: 4,812 (42.9%)

=== 2017 election ===
2017 Midlothian Council election

Penicuik - 3 seats
Party	Candidate	FPv%	Count				
Party	Candidate	FPv%	1	2	3	4	5
Conservative	Andrew Hardie	26.2	1,517				
Labour	Adam Montgomery (incumbent)†	25.6	1,482				
SNP	Debbi McCall	21.0	1,212	1,214.5	1,217.9	1,336.4	1,472.8
SNP	Joe Wallace (incumbent)	14.3	828	829.7	832.8	886.1	940.0
Liberal Democrats	Ken Brown	7.3	425	455.7	466.9	571.6	
Green	Jim Garry	5.6	329	333.1	336.5		
Electorate: TBC Valid: 5,793 Spoilt: 62 Quota: 1,449 Turnout: 52.3%

=== 2012 election ===
2012 Midlothian Council election

Penicuik - 3 seats
Party	Candidate	FPv%	Count					
Party	Candidate	FPv%	1	2	3	4	5	6
SNP	Derek George Rosie	29.9	1,427					
Labour	Adam Montgomery (incumbent)	28.6	1,363					
SNP	Joe Wallace	14.8	706	915.6	950.6	1,009.1	1,057.9	1,343.9
Liberal Democrats	Sheila Thacker	11.8	562	571.5	601.6	721.8	993.1	
Conservative	Sandy Forrest	9.9	474	476.5	489.8	505.9		
Green	Gary Christopher Bell	5.0	237	242.6	269.5			
Electorate: 10,693 Valid: 4,769 Spoilt: 76 Quota: 1,193 Turnout: 4,845 (44.6%)

=== 2007 election ===
2007 Midlothian Council election

Midlothian council election, 2007: Penicuik
Party	Candidate	FPv%	%	Seat	Count
SNP	Margaret Wilson	2,307	34.7	1	1
Labour	Adam Montgomery	1,554	23.3	2	4
Liberal Democrats	Ken Brown	1,001	15.0	3	7
Liberal Democrats	Shiela Thacker	974	14.6		
Conservative	Sandy Forrest	694	10.4		
Solidarity	Jackie Moyers	64	1.0		
Scottish Socialist	Norman Gilfillan	62	0.9		
