= 1995 Midlothian Council election =

1995 Scottish local government election

Elections to Midlothian Council were held on 6 April 1995, the same day as the other Scottish local government elections. Midlothian had been created as a unitary authority under the Local Government etc. (Scotland) Act 1994.

Labour won every seat on the council, bar two, which were won by the SNP.

== Election results ==
Midlothian local election result 1995
Party	Seats	Gains	Losses	Net gain/loss	Seats %	Votes %	Votes	+/−
Labour	13				86.67	57.4	15,606	▲11.2
SNP	2				13.33	34.5	9,377	▲8.9
Conservative	0				0.00	4.2	1,148	▼15.6
Liberal Democrats	0				0.00	3.5	957	▼3.7
Green	0				0.00	0.3	90	▼1.1
