= 1999 Midlothian Council election =

Council election in 1999

Results by ward.

Elections to Midlothian Council were held on 6 May 1999, the same day as the other Scottish local government elections and the Scottish Parliament general election.

Labour retained their dominance of the council, with the Liberal Democrats forming the second largest party on the council.

== Election results ==
Midlothian local election result 1999
Party	Seats	Gains	Losses	Net gain/loss	Seats %	Votes %	Votes	+/−
Labour	17					45.81	17,591	
Liberal Democrats	1					15.63	6,003	
SNP	0				0.0	30.65	11,769	
Conservative	0				0.0	7.55	2,901	
Independent	0				0.0	0.36	137	
