= 2017 Midlothian Council election =

2017 Scottish local government election

- 4 May 2017

All 18 seats to Midlothian Council 10 seats needed for a majority

	First party	Second party	Third party
Leader	Derek Milligan	Kelly Parry	Peter Smaill
Party	Labour	SNP	Conservative
Leader's seat	Bonnyrigg	Midlothian West	Midlothian East
Last election	8 seats, 39.49%	8 seats, 39.47%	0 seats, 8.51%
Seats before	8	8	0
Seats won	7	6	5
Seat change	▼1	▼2	▲5
Popular vote	9,887	10,038	7,444
	Fourth party	Fifth party
Leader	Ian Baxter	Peter de Vink
Party	Green	Independent
Leader's seat	Bonnyrigg	Midlothian East
Last election	1 seats, 4.49%	1 seats, 3.75%
Seats before	1	1
Seats won	0	0
Seat change	▼1	▼1
Popular vote	2,250	2,453
- Results by ward
Council Leader before election
Cath Johnstone
SNP
Council Leader after election
Derek Milligan
Labour

The 2017 Midlothian Council election took place on 4 May 2017 to elect members of Midlothian Council. The election used the six wards created as a result of the Local Governance (Scotland) Act 2004, with each ward electing three Councillors using the single transferable vote system form of proportional representation, with 18 Councillors being elected.

It was the first time that the Conservative party had won council seats in Midlothian since the 1995 election.

== Results ==
2017 Midlothian Council election result
Party	Seats	Gains	Losses	Net gain/loss	Seats %	Votes %	Votes	+/−
Labour	7	0	1	▼1	38.89	30.20	9,887	▼9.29
SNP	6	0	2	▼2	33.34	30.67	10,038	▼8.80
Conservative	5	5	0	▲5	27.78	22.74	7,444	▲14.23
Independent	0	0	1	▼1	0.00	7.49	2,453	▲3.74
Green	0	0	1	▼1	0.00	6.87	2,250	▲2.38
Liberal Democrats	0	0	0	0	0.00	2.01	661	▼1.72

Note: "Votes" are the first preference votes. The net gain/loss and percentage changes relate to the result of the previous Scottish local elections on 3 May 2012. This may differ from other published sources showing gain/loss relative to seats held at dissolution of Scotland's councils.

== Ward results ==
=== Penicuik ===
- 2012: 2xSNP; 1xLab
- 2017: 1xCon; 1xSNP; 1xLab
- 2012-2017: 1 Con gain from SNP

Penicuik - 3 seats
Party	Candidate	FPv%	Count				
Party	Candidate	FPv%	1	2	3	4	5
Conservative	Andrew Hardie	26.2	1,517				
Labour	Adam Montgomery (incumbent)†	25.6	1,482				
SNP	Debbi McCall	21.0	1,212	1,214.5	1,217.9	1,336.4	1,472.8
SNP	Joe Wallace (incumbent)	14.3	828	829.7	832.8	886.1	940.0
Liberal Democrats	Ken Brown	7.3	425	455.7	466.9	571.6	
Green	Jim Garry	5.6	329	333.1	336.5		
Electorate: TBC Valid: 5,793 Spoilt: 62 Quota: 1,449 Turnout: 52.3%

=== Bonnyrigg ===
- 2012: 1xLab; 1xSNP; 1xGreen
- 2017: 1xLab; 1xSNP; 1xCon
- 2012-2017 Change: 1 Con gain from Green

Bonnyrigg - 3 seats
Party	Candidate	FPv%	Count					
Party	Candidate	FPv%	1	2	3	4	5	6
Labour	Derek Milligan (incumbent)	29.0	1,901					
Conservative	Janet Lay-Douglas	21.6	1,415	1,425.6	1,515.9	1,521.3	1,524.7	1,708.1
SNP	Dianne Alexander	18.4	1,203	1,210.0	1,222.4	1,778.9		
Green	Ian Baxter (incumbent)	10.7	701	713.7	763.8	799.9	870.2	1,037.0
SNP	Colin Lawrie	9.4	617	623.3	632.6			
Labour	Louie Lorraine Milliken	7.1	466	665.6	715.8	728.1	741.4	
Independent	George McIntyre	3.8	250	257.4				
Electorate: TBC Valid: 6,553 Spoilt: 103 Quota: 1,639 Turnout: 48.5%

=== Dalkeith ===
- 2012: 2xLab; 1xSNP
- 2017: 2xLab; 1xSNP
- 2012-2017 Change: No change

Dalkeith - 3 seats
Party	Candidate	FPv%	Count						
Party	Candidate	FPv%	1	2	3	4	5	6	7
SNP	Colin Cassidy	27.2	1,142						
Labour	Stephen Curran	23.2	976	980.7	1,000.9	1,051.6			
Labour	Margot Russell (incumbent)	19.1	800	804.2	840.4	884.7	885.9	993.5	1,317.5
Conservative	Robin Traquair	16.8	706	707.3	716.3	779.4	779.4	791.8	
Independent	Jim Bryant (incumbent)	5.9	248	249.9	275.1				
Green	Jill Simon	4.0	168	171.9					
SNP	Gary Young	3.8	158	229.1	282.0	330.4	330.5		
Electorate: TBC Valid: 4,198 Spoilt: 121 Quota: 1,050 Turnout: 41.9%

=== Midlothian West ===
- 2012: 2xSNP; 1xLab
- 2017: 1xCon; 1xSNP; 1xLab
- 2012-2017 Change: 1 Con gain from SNP

Midlothian West - 3 seats
Party	Candidate	FPv%	Count						
Party	Candidate	FPv%	1	2	3	4	5	6	7
Conservative	Pauline Winchester	26.9	1,503						
SNP	Kelly Parry (incumbent)	19.5	1,091	1,092.0	1,106.3	1,159.7	1,679.7		
Labour	Russell Imrie (incumbent)	12.2	684	698.8	737.5	817.0	837.3	867.9	1,443.5
Labour	Stephen Blain	11.0	612	620.1	650.1	700.2	707.3	724.1	
SNP	David Temple	10.4	581	582.7	587.7	616.9			
Green	Helen Blackburn	8.4	468	473.4	552.3	680.8	715.9	835.8	889.4
Independent	Andrew Coventry (incumbent)	7.4	413	435.8	484.2				
Liberal Democrats	Ross Laird	4.2	236	256.6					
Electorate: TBC Valid: 5,588 Spoilt: 91 Quota: 1,398 Turnout: 47.2%

=== Midlothian East ===
- 2012: 1xSNP; 1xLab; 1xIndependent
- 2017: 1xCon; 1xSNP; 1xLab
- 2012-2017 Change: 1 Con gain from Independent

Midlothian East - 3 seats
Party	Candidate	FPv%	Count			
Party	Candidate	FPv%	1	2	3	4
Conservative	Peter Smaill	26.9	1,522			
Labour	John Hackett	22.7	1,284	1,314.3	1,387.5	1,431.6
Independent	Robert Hogg	18.8	1,064	1,098.0	1,169.1	1,210.2
SNP	Kenneth Baird††	15.4	872	873.1	928.1	1,485.8
SNP	Louise D'Arcy-Greig	10.8	609	610.4	677.4	
Green	Helen Armstrong	5.3	301	309.1		
Electorate: TBC Valid: 5,652 Spoilt: 68 Quota: 1,414 Turnout: 48.3%

=== Midlothian South ===
- 2012: 2xLab; 1xSNP
- 2017: 1xLab; 1xSNP; 1xCon
- 2012-2017 Change: 1 Con gain from Lab

Midlothian South - 3 seats
Party	Candidate	FPv%	Count						
Party	Candidate	FPv%	1	2	3	4	5	6	7
Labour	Jim Muirhead (incumbent)	24.6	1,218	1,257					
SNP	Cath Johnstone (incumbent)	21.6	1,067	1,104	1,104.9	1,164.8	1,295.1		
Conservative	Kieran Munro	15.8	781	801	802.0	867.0	1,048.4	1,050.7	1,249.7
SNP	Ellen Scott	13.3	658	721	721.9	748.3	797.5	844.1	
Independent	Jason Ferry	9.7	478	541	541.9	625.5			
Labour	Bryan Pottinger (incumbent)	9.4	464	497	510.8				
Green	Malcolm Spaven	5.7	283						
Electorate: TBC Valid: 4,949 Spoilt: 76 Quota: 1,238 Turnout: 45.2%

== Changes since the election ==
† On 10 January 2018 Penicuik Labour Cllr Adam Montgomery died following a short illness. A by-election was held on 22 March 2018 and the seat was gained by the SNP's Joe Wallace.

†† Midlothian East SNP Cllr Kenneth Baird resigned his seat in February 2021. A by-election was held on 25 March 2021 and the seat was retained by the SNP's Stuart McKenzie.

== By-elections since 2017 ==
Penicuik By-election (22 March 2018)
Party	Candidate	FPv%	Count		
Party	Candidate	FPv%	1	2	3
SNP	Joe Wallace	35.0	1,663	1,803	2,237
Conservative	Murdo MacDonald	30.2	1,433	1,469	1,788
Labour	Vivienne Wallace	27.6	1,310	1,414	
Green	Helen Armstrong	7.2	344		
Electorate: TBC Valid: 4,781 Spoilt: 31 Quota: 2,376 Turnout: 4,812 (42.9%)

- Midlothian East By-election (25 March 2021) - 1 Seat
  Party	Candidate	FPv%	Count			
  Party	Candidate	FPv%	1	2	3	4
  SNP	Stuart McKenzie	35.4	1,538	1,547	1,662	1,963
  Conservative	Alan Symon	29.4	1,279	1,326	1,364	1,656
  Labour	Hazel Flanagan	24.6	1,070	1,114	1,222	
  Green	Joy Godfrey	6.5	282	332		
  Liberal Democrats	Margaret Davis	4.1	178			
  Electorate: TBC Valid: 4,347 Spoilt: 21 Quota: 2,174 Turnout: 4,368 (35.8%)
