= 2003 Midlothian Council election =

2003 Scottish local government election

Results by ward.

Elections to Midlothian Council were held on 1 May 2003, the same day as the other Scottish local government elections and the Scottish Parliament general election. The election was the last one using the 18 single-member wards using the plurality (first past the post) system of election.

Labour retained their dominance of the council, with the Liberal Democrats forming the second largest party on the council.

== Election results ==
Midlothian local election result 2003
Party	Seats	Gains	Losses	Net gain/loss	Seats %	Votes %	Votes	+/−
Labour	15				83.3	44.6	13,221	
Liberal Democrats	2				11.1	17.4	5,149	
Independent	1				5.6	2.1	611	
SNP	0				0.0	23.0	6,829	
Conservative	0				0.0	10.7	3,186	
Scottish Socialist	0				0.0	1.4	414	
Green	0				0.0	0.9	261	

== Results by ward (A-Z) ==
An asterisk (*) indicates an incumbent candidate.

Two asterisks (**) indicates an incumbent candidate standing for re-election in a different ward.

Arniston/Cockpen
Party	Candidate	Votes	%	±%
Labour	James Dunsmuir	919	49.1	−0.3
SNP	Thomas Perrie	435	23.2	−13.6
Conservative	Jonathan Callander	215	11.5	N/A
Liberal Democrats	Mary Davies	210	11.2	−2.6
Scottish Socialist	Vicky Haylott	94	5.0	N/A
Majority		484	25.9	+13.4
Turnout		1873	53.3	−7.3
Labour hold		Swing		

Bilston/Roslin
Party	Candidate	Votes	%	±%
Labour	Charles McIntosh	624	41.8	+0.7
SNP	David Jarvis	452	30.3	−8.8
Liberal Democrats	Susan Hunter	218	14.6	−5.1
Conservative	Peter Smaill	199	13.3	N/A
Majority		172	11.5	+9.5
Turnout		1493	45.6	−14.1
Labour hold		Swing		

Bonnyrigg North
Party	Candidate	Votes	%	±%
Labour	Derek Milligan*	903	48.6	+1.3
SNP	Isabel Perrie	329	17.7	−7.6
Green	Ian Baxter	261	14.0	N/A
Conservative	Marion Crawford	236	12.7	−2.3
Liberal Democrats	Rona Semple	130	7.0	−5.4
Majority		574	30.9	+8.9
Turnout		1859	52.5	−12.7
Labour hold		Swing		

Bonnyrigg South
Party	Candidate	Votes	%	±%
Labour	Jack Aitchison*	932	54.9	+6.3
SNP	Linda Hunter	417	24.5	−11.4
Liberal Democrats	Sandra Hamilton	205	12.1	−3.4
Conservative	William Crawford	145	8.5	N/A
Majority		515	30.4	+17.7
Turnout		1699	45.3	−15.1
Labour hold		Swing		

Dalkeith/Eskbank
Party	Candidate	Votes	%	±%
Labour	Daniel Molloy*	727	41.9	−1.4
SNP	Douglas Crawford	406	23.4	+1.4
Conservative	Robin Traquair	335	19.3	+2.6
Liberal Democrats	James Miller	267	15.4	+3.8
Majority		321	18.5	−2.8
Turnout		1735	51.4	−11.6
Labour hold		Swing		

Dalkeith/Newton
Party	Candidate	Votes	%	±%
Labour	Samuel Campbell*	968	59.6	−0.4
SNP	Andrew Perrie	289	17.8	−2.2
Liberal Democrats	Douglas Fettes	196	12.1	+1.8
Conservative	Anna Traquair	171	10.5	+0.8
Majority		679	41.8	+1.7
Turnout		1624	48.3	−15.2
Labour hold		Swing		

Dalkeith/Woodburn
Party	Candidate	Votes	%	±%
Labour	William Russell	793	48.2	−19.0
Liberal Democrats	Raymond Prior	366	22.2	+15.7
SNP	Owen Thompson	289	17.6	−8.6
Scottish Socialist	Bob Goupillot	143	8.7	N/A
Conservative	Mary Kristensen	55	3.3	N/A
Majority		427	26.0	−15.0
Turnout		1646	46.2	−15.2
Labour hold		Swing		

Easthouses/Mayfield North
Party	Candidate	Votes	%	±%
Labour	Peter Boyes*	731	56.5	+4.3
SNP	Frederick Ahrens	412	31.9	−7.0
Liberal Democrats	Maeve Duignan	95	7.3	−1.5
Conservative	Christopher Tolley	55	4.3	N/A
Majority		319	24.6	+11.3
Turnout		1293	40.1	−13.0
Labour hold		Swing		

Gorebridge South
Party	Candidate	Votes	%	±%
Labour	James Muirhead	700	44.6	−6.3
SNP	Catherine Ballantyne	636	40.5	−8.6
Liberal Democrats	Mairi Murrison	120	7.6	N/A
Conservative	Richard Ord	113	7.2	N/A
Majority		64	4.1	+2.3
Turnout		1569	50.2	−8.3
Labour hold		Swing		

Loanhead
Party	Candidate	Votes	%	±%
Independent	William Hoggan	611	34.5	N/A
Labour	George Purcell*	599	33.8	−14.2
SNP	William Bogue	285	16.1	−14.7
Liberal Democrats	Katie Moffat	194	11.0	−10.2
Conservative	Isla Jones	82	4.6	N/A
Majority		12	0.7	−16.5
Turnout		1771	50.9	−10.6
Independent gain from Labour		Swing		

Mayfield South
Party	Candidate	Votes	%	±%
Labour	Robert Jenkins	741	56.1	+6.8
SNP	Angela Kirkwood	379	28.7	+1.1
Liberal Democrats	Leslie Thacker	184	13.9	+1.4
Conservative	Judith Tolley	17	1.3	−9.3
Majority		362	27.4	+5.7
Turnout		1321	39.3	−18.8
Labour hold		Swing		

Newbattle/Pathhead
Party	Candidate	Votes	%	±%
Labour	Margot Russell*	537	35.8	−4.8
SNP	Carolyn Perrie	349	23.2	−4.6
Conservative	Gloria Rankine	322	21.4	+3.8
Liberal Democrats	William Davies	294	19.6	+5.6
Majority		188	12.6	−0.2
Turnout		1502	49.7	−11.3
Labour hold		Swing		

Newtongrange
Party	Candidate	Votes	%	±%
Labour	Wilma Chalmers	929	73.4	+24.6
Liberal Democrats	Heather Moffat	98	7.7	−2.3
Conservative	Charles Callander	88	7.0	N/A
Scottish Socialist	David Whitehead	84	6.6	N/A
SNP	Colin Beattie	67	5.3	−36.0
Majority		831	65.7	+58.2
Turnout		1266	35.4	−29.7
Labour hold		Swing		

Penicuik North
Party	Candidate	Votes	%	±%
Liberal Democrats	Sheila Thacker	604	30.1	+3.7
Labour	Mary-Margaret Martin*	555	27.6	−0.7
SNP	Paul Callaghan	533	26.5	−1.4
Conservative	Alexander Forrest	317	15.8	−1.6
Majority		49	2.5	+2.1
Turnout		2009	51.3	−13.8
Liberal Democrats gain from Labour		Swing		

Penicuik South East
Party	Candidate	Votes	%	±%
Liberal Democrats	David Fletcher*	864	45.0	+9.8
Labour	John Miller	516	26.9	−3.9
Conservative	Muriel Dawson	279	14.5	−1.1
SNP	Russell Gray	260	13.5	−4.9
Majority		348	18.1	+13.7
Turnout		1919	54.7	−13.0
Liberal Democrats hold		Swing		

Penicuik South West
Party	Candidate	Votes	%	±%
Labour	Adam Montgomery*	627	34.3	−1.2
Liberal Democrats	Alan Naylor	607	33.2	+8.8
SNP	Ian Scott	347	19.0	−2.7
Conservative	William Stoddart	246	13.5	−4.9
Majority		20	1.1	−10.0
Turnout		1827	52.4	−14.6
Labour hold		Swing		

Penicuik/Roslin
Party	Candidate	Votes	%	±%
Labour	Russell Imrie*	630	39.4	−1.0
SNP	Ian Watson	426	26.7	−6.8
Liberal Democrats	Anne Browne	278	17.4	+1.5
Conservative	John Stoddart	170	10.6	+0.4
Scottish Socialist	Norman Gilfillan	93	5.8	N/A
Majority		204	12.7	+5.8
Turnout		1597	45.9	−15.4
Labour hold		Swing		

Poltonhall/Rosewell
Party	Candidate	Votes	%	±%
Labour	Graham Marr*	790	47.4	−3.2
SNP	Robert Constable	518	31.1	−3.6
Liberal Democrats	Margaret Miller	219	13.1	−1.6
Conservative	James Orr	141	8.5	N/A
Majority		272	16.3	+0.4
Turnout		1668	47.9	−13.5
Labour hold		Swing		
