= Owen Thompson =

Scottish politician (born 1978)

The Right Honourable Owen Thompson
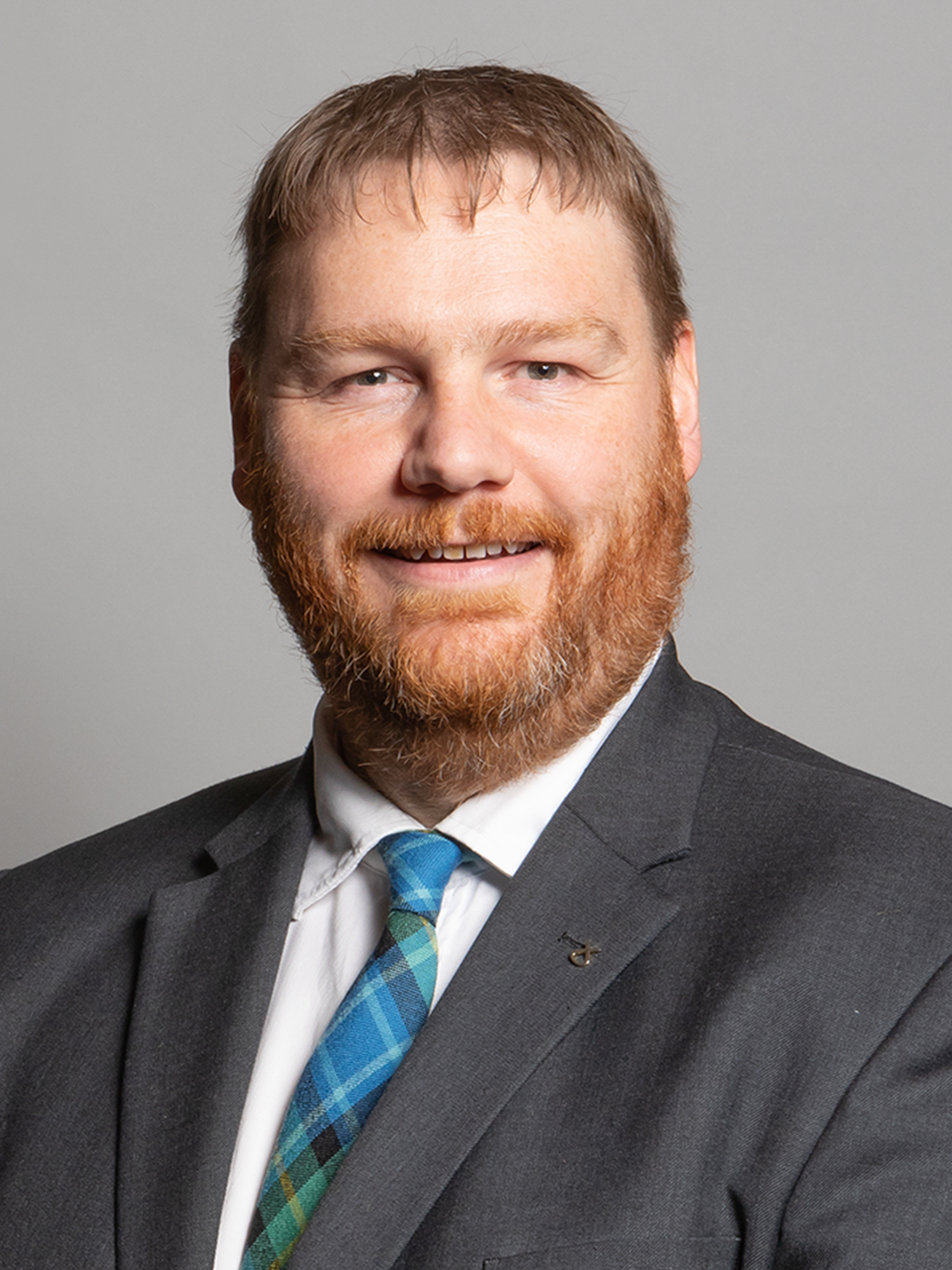
- Official portrait, 2020

Chief Whip of the Scottish National Party in the House of Commons
- In office 4 September 2023 – 5 July 2024
- Leader: Stephen Flynn
- Preceded by: Brendan O'Hara
- Succeeded by: Kirsty Blackman
- In office 9 March 2021 – 9 December 2022
- Leader: Ian Blackford
- Preceded by: Patrick Grady
- Succeeded by: Martin Docherty-Hughes

Member of Parliament for Midlothian
- In office 12 December 2019 – 30 May 2024
- Preceded by: Danielle Rowley
- Succeeded by: Kirsty McNeill
- In office 7 May 2015 – 3 May 2017
- Preceded by: David Hamilton
- Succeeded by: Danielle Rowley

Personal details
- Born: 17 March 1978 (age 48)
- Party: Scottish National Party
- Education: Edinburgh Napier University
- Website: Official website

Owen George Thompson (born 17 March 1978) is a Scottish National Party politician who was the Member of Parliament (MP) for Midlothian from 2015 to 2017 and from 2019 to 2024. He was elected in 2015, defeated at the 2017 general election, and regained the seat at the 2019 general election.

== Early life and education ==
Owen Thompson was born on 17 March 1978, the son of Rev. Robert Thompson and Margaret Thompson. He was brought up in Loanhead after moving there when he was seven. He studied accounting and finance at Edinburgh Napier University.

== Political career ==
Thompson had previously been the leader of Midlothian Council. He was first elected to the council at the Loanhead by-election in 2005. At the age of 27, he was Scotland's youngest councillor at the time. He was then re-elected in the 2007 council election and again in the 2012 council election. He became deputy leader of the council in 2012, and leader in November 2013, succeeding his party colleague Bob Constable. He remained on the council until 2015.

In December 2014, the Bonnyrigg, Loanhead and District SNP branch nominated Thompson to be the party's official candidate at the next general election. At the 2015 general election, Thompson was elected as MP for Midlothian with 50.6% of the vote and a majority of 9,859.

He was sworn into office at Westminster on 20 May 2015, and on the same day was given a position in the SNP Whips' Office under the SNP's chief whip, Mike Weir.

At the 2017 general election, Thompson lost his seat to Danielle Rowley of the Labour Party, losing by 885 votes and receiving 34.4% of the vote.

Thompson regained his seat at the 2019 general election, winning with 41.5% of the vote and a majority of 5,705.

In March 2021, Thompson was appointed chief whip for the SNP in Westminster after the resignation of Patrick Grady. He was dismissed by new leader Stephen Flynn in December 2022. He returned to the position in September 2023.

In March 2024, Thompson was re-selected as the SNP candidate for Midlothian at the 2024 general election.

He was sworn into His Majesty's Most Honourable Privy Council on 10 April 2024 as part of the 2024 Special Honours

== Post-parliamentary career ==
In July 2025, he told PoliticsHome that he was organising a conference on Scottish Independence.

== Personal life ==
Thompson lists his recreations as football and computer games.

Parliament of the United Kingdom
| Preceded by David Hamilton | Member of Parliament for Midlothian; 2015–2017 | Succeeded by Danielle Rowley |
| Preceded by Danielle Rowley | Member of Parliament for Midlothian; 2019–2024 | Succeeded by Kirsty McNeill |
