= 2007 Midlothian Council election =

2007 Scottish local government election

← 2003	3 May 2007	2012 →

All 18 seats to Midlothian Council 10 seats needed for a majority

Results by ward

Elections to Midlothian Council were held on 3 May 2007, the same day as the other Scottish local government elections and the Scottish Parliament general election. The election was the first one using six new wards created as a result of the Local Governance (Scotland) Act 2004. Each ward will elect three or four councillors using the single transferable vote system form of proportional representation. The new wards replace 18 single-member wards which used the plurality (first past the post) system of election.

Labour lost control of the council to no overall control, something which the party suffered in many other parts of Scotland. However, they regained control in 2008 when Cllr Katie Moffat defected from the Liberal Democrats to Labour. Overall, Labour lost six seats and the single independent lost their seat, with most going to the Scottish National Party as well as a single gain for the Liberal Democrats.

== Election results ==
Midlothian local election results 2007
Party	Seats	Gains	Losses	Net gain/loss	Seats %	Votes %	Votes	+/−
Labour	9	N/A	N/A	–6	50.0	36.8	12,559	
SNP	6	N/A	N/A	+6	33.3	33.4	11,406	
Liberal Democrats	3	N/A	N/A	+1	16.7	12.7	4,331	
Conservative	0	N/A	N/A	±0	0.0	10.1	3,443	
Green	0	N/A	N/A	±0	0.0	1.9	650	
Scottish Socialist	0	N/A	N/A	±0	0.0	1.5	511	
Solidarity	0	N/A	N/A	±0	0.0	1.4	494	
Had Enough	0	N/A	N/A	±0	0.0	0.3	105	
Independent	0	N/A	N/A	–1	0.0	2.0	667	

== Ward results ==
Midlothian council election, 2007: Penicuik
Party	Candidate	FPv%	%	Seat	Count
SNP	Margaret Wilson	2,307	34.7	1	1
Labour	Adam Montgomery	1,554	23.3	2	4
Liberal Democrats	Ken Brown	1,001	15.0	3	7
Liberal Democrats	Shiela Thacker	974	14.6		
Conservative	Sandy Forrest	694	10.4		
Solidarity	Jackie Moyers	64	1.0		
Scottish Socialist	Norman Gilfillan	62	0.9		

Midlothian council election, 2007: Bonnyrigg
Party	Candidate	FPv%	%	Seat	Count
SNP	Bob Constable	1,905	30.3	1	1
Labour	Jack Aitchison††	1,530	24.4	2	2
Labour	Derek Milligan	1,383	22.0	3	7
Green	Ian Baxter	650	10.4		
Conservative	John Stoddart	600	9.6		
Scottish Socialist	Neil Bennet	138	2.2		
Solidarity	Chris Moyers	71	1.1		

Midlothian council election, 2007: Dalkeith
Party	Candidate	FPv%	%	Seat	Count
SNP	Craig Statham	1,333	29.9	1	1
Labour	Alex Bennett†††	1,331	29.9	2	1
Labour	Margot Russell	761	17.1	3	7
Liberal Democrats	Ray Prior	657	14.8		
Conservative	Rosemary McDougall	217	4.9		
Solidarity	Alan Boyce	94	2.1		
Scottish Socialist	Bob Goupillot	60	1.3		

Midlothian council election, 2007: Midlothian West
Party	Candidate	FPv%	%	Seat	Count
SNP	Owen Thompson	1,981	33.2	1	1
Labour	Russell Imrie	1,506	25.2	2	1
Liberal Democrats	Les Thacker	868	14.5	3	10
Conservative	Andrew Hardie	634	10.6		
Independent	Elizabeth Veitch	259	4.3		
Independent	George Purcell	220	3.7		
Independent	Pat Kenny	188	3.2		
Scottish Socialist	Lynn Leitch	108	1.8		
Had Enough	George McCleery	105	1.8		
Solidarity	Brian Cranston	99	1.7		

Midlothian council election, 2007: Midlothian East
Party	Candidate	FPv%	%	Seat	Count
SNP	Lisa Beattie	1,988	34.6	1	1
Labour	Peter Boyes	1,357	23.6	2	4
Liberal Democrats	Katie Moffat†	831	14.5	3	7
Conservative	Robin Traquair	812	14.1		
Labour	Bob Jenkins	617	10.7		
Solidarity	Derek Duncan	82	1.4		
Scottish Socialist	Murray Court	63	1.1		

Midlothian council election, 2007: Midlothian South
Party	Candidate	FPv%	%	Seat	Count
SNP	Colin Beattie	1,892	37.4	1	1
Labour	Wilma Chalmers	1,336	26.4	2	1
Labour	James Muirhead	1,184	23.4	3	2
Conservative	Peter Smaill	486	9.6		
Solidarity	Willie Duncan	84	1.7		
Scottish Socialist	John Carroll	80	1.6		

== Changes since 2007 election ==
- † On 3 June 2008, Midlothian East Cllr Katie Moffat defected from the Liberal Democrats to the Labour Party.
- †† On 29 March 2012, Bonnyrigg Cllr Jack Aitchison resigned from the Labour Party and now sits as an Independent.
- ††† On 5 April 2012, Dalkeith Cllr Alex Bennett formally resigned from the council to secure his Local Government pension.
