= 2012 Midlothian Council election =

2012 Scottish local government election

- 3 May 2012

All 18 seats to Midlothian Council 10 seats needed for a majority
	First party	Second party	Third party
Leader	Derek Milligan	Bob Constable	Ian Baxter
Party	Labour	SNP	Green
Leader's seat	Bonnyrigg	Midlothian East	Bonnyrigg
Last election	9 seats, 50%	6 seats, 33.3%	0 seats, 0%
Seats before	10	6	0
Seats won	8	8	1
Seat change	▼1	▲2	▲1
	Fourth party	Fifth party
Leader	Peter de Vink	Les Thacker
Party	Independent	Liberal Democrats
Leader's seat	Midlothian East	Midlothian West defeated
Last election	0 seats, 0%	3 seats, 16.7%
Seats before	0	2
Seats won	1	0
Seat change	▲1	▼3
- Results by ward.
Council Leader before election
Derek Milligan
Labour
Council Leader after election
Bob Constable
SNP

The 2012 Midlothian Council election took place on 3 May 2012 to elect members of Midlothian Council. The election used the six wards created as a result of the Local Governance (Scotland) Act 2004, with each ward electing three or four Councillors using the single transferable vote system form of proportional representation, with 18 Councillors being elected.

The election saw Labour retain their traditional position as the largest party on the council though they lost compared to the 2007 election. The Scottish National Party significantly increased their representation with 2 net gains and a significant rise in vote share to have the same seat numbers as the Labour Party.

The Scottish Green Party gained a seat on the council for the first time and so too did Independent, former Conservative member, Peter de Vink. The Scottish Liberal Democrats were wiped out from this authority as well, losing all 3 of their seats (2 in the election, 1 by the defection of a member after 2007).

Following the election the SNP formed a minority administration with the support of the Green Party and the Independent. This is the first time that Labour had not had a role in the running of Midlothian in 84 years.

== Election result ==
Midlothian local election result 2012
Party	Seats	Gains	Losses	Net gain/loss	Seats %	Votes %	Votes	+/−
Labour	8	0	1	-1	44.44	39.49	9,967	+2.69
SNP	8	2	0	+2	44.44	39.47	9,936	+5.97
Green	1	1	0	+1	5.56	4.49	1,134	+2.59
Independent	1	1	0	+1	5.56	3.75	946	+1.75
Conservative	0	0	0	0	0.00	8.51	2,147	-1.59
Liberal Democrats	0	0	3	-3	0.00	3.73	941	-8.87
TUSC	0	0	0	0	0.00	0.67	168	New

Note: "Votes" are the first preference votes. The net gain/loss and percentage changes relate to the result of the previous Scottish local elections on 3 May 2007. This may differ from other published sources showing gain/loss relative to seats held at dissolution of Scotland's councils.

== Ward results ==
=== Penicuik ===
- 2007: 1xSNP; 1xLab; 1xLib Dem
- 2012: 2xSNP; 1xLab
- 2007-2012: SNP gain one seat from Lib Dem

Penicuik – 3 seats
Party	Candidate	FPv%	Count					
Party	Candidate	FPv%	1	2	3	4	5	6
SNP	Derek George Rosie	29.9	1,427					
Labour	Adam Montgomery (incumbent)	28.6	1,363					
SNP	Joe Wallace	14.8	706	915.6	950.6	1,009.1	1,057.9	1,343.9
Liberal Democrats	Sheila Thacker	11.8	562	571.5	601.6	721.8	993.1	
Conservative	Sandy Forrest	9.9	474	476.5	489.8	505.9		
Green	Gary Christopher Bell	5.0	237	242.6	269.5			
Electorate: 10,693 Valid: 4,769 Spoilt: 76 Quota: 1,193 Turnout: 4,845 (44.6%)

=== Bonnyrigg ===
- 2007: 2xLab; 1xSNP
- 2012: 1xLab; 1xSNP; 1xGRN
- 2007-2012 Change: GRN gain one seat from Lab

Bonnyrigg – 3 seats
Party	Candidate	FPv%	Count						
Party	Candidate	FPv%	1	2	3	4	5	6	7
Labour	Derek Milligan (incumbent)	30.67	1,574						
SNP	Bob Constable (incumbent)	24.49	1,257	1,272.1	1,566.5				
Green	Ian Baxter	13.07	671	681.3	704.2	787.1	930.4	1,079.9	1,407.4
Labour	Louie Lorraine Milliken	10.23	525	749.4	768.5	809.4	864.9	1,020.4	
Independent	Jack Aitchison (incumbent)	7.44	382	396.9	406.5	430.3	474.1		
Conservative	Emma Cummings	7.11	365	368.5	373.5	386.8			
SNP	Thomas Munro	6.98	358	366.5					
Electorate: 12,007 Valid: 5,132 Spoilt: 99 Quota: 1,284 Turnout: 5,205 (42.74%)

=== Dalkeith ===
- 2007: 2xLab; 1xSNP
- 2012: 2xLab; 1xSNP
- 2007-2012 Change: No change

Dalkeith – 3 seats
Party	Candidate	FPv%	Count				
Party	Candidate	FPv%	1	2	3	4	5
Labour	Alex Bennett	31.6	1,021				
SNP	Jim Bryant	24.9	803	816.9			
Labour	Margot Russell (incumbent)	18.7	604	760.2	760.6	774.9	810.6
SNP	Colin Cassidy	12.7	410	417.7	425.6	447.6	469.1
Conservative	Robin Traquair	5.7	184	187.3	187.4	194.8	235.2
Liberal Democrats	George Boyd	4.1	133	138.8	138.9	152.4	
TUSC	Willie Duncan	2.3	75	80.8	80.9		
Electorate: 8,678 Valid: 3,230 Spoilt: 81 Quota: 808 Turnout: 3,311 (37.22%)

=== Midlothian West ===
- 2007: 1xSNP; 1xLab; 1xLib Dem
- 2012: 2xSNP; 1xLab
- 2007-2012 Change: SNP gain one seat from Lib Dem

Midlothian West – 3 seats
Party	Candidate	FPv%	Count						
Party	Candidate	FPv%	1	2	3	4	5	6	7
SNP	Andrew Coventry	21.5	930	935	943	987	1,017	1,071	1,106
SNP	Owen Thompson (incumbent)††	18.20	789	793	805	832	861	900	960
Labour	Russell Imrie (incumbent)	17.9	776	778	784	823	872	966	1,595
Labour	Alex Jones	17.58	762	764	773	794	821	856	
Conservative	Andrew Hardie	10.7	462	480	497	567			
Liberal Democrats	Les Thacker (incumbent)	5.67	246	247	263	309			
Green	Helen Blackburn	5.2	226	234	258				
Independent	George McCleery	2.38	103	115					
TUSC	Lynn Leitch	0.95	41						
Electorate: 10,714 Valid: 4,335 Spoilt: 54 Quota: 1,084 Turnout: 4,389 (40.46%)

=== Midlothian East ===
- 2007: 1xSNP; 1xLab; 1xLib Dem
- 2012: 1xSNP; 1xLab; 1xIndependent
- 2007-2012 Change: Independent gain one seat from Labour

Midlothian East – 3 seats
Party	Candidate	FPv%	Count						
Party	Candidate	FPv%	1	2	3	4	5	6	7
SNP	Lisa Beattie (incumbent)	33.1	1,372						
Labour	Peter Boyes (incumbent) †	24.2	1,003	1,015.5	1,020.5	1,036.7	1,048.6		
Labour	Katie Moffat (incumbent)	11.5	475	486.9	493.2	525.7			
Independent	Peter de Vink	11.1	461	484.9	503.4	686.3	737.8	800.9	1,014.3
SNP	Paul Bertram	9.8	405	656.9	665.9	689.4	721.1	781.7	
Conservative	Richard Thomson	9.1	379	388.3	388.3				
TUSC	Bob Goupillot	1.3	52	54.2					
Electorate: 10,409 Valid: 4,147 Spoilt: 78 Quota: 1,037 Turnout: 4,225 (39.84%)

=== Midlothian South ===
- 2007: 2xLab; 1xSNP
- 2012: 2xLab; 1xSNP
- 2007-2012 Change: No change

Midlothian South – 3 seats
Party	Candidate	FPv%	Count				
Party	Candidate	FPv%	1	2	3	4	5
Labour	Jim Muirhead (incumbent)	36.0	1,305				
SNP	Cath Johnstone	21.7	786	807.9	845.1	855.7	1,538.5
SNP	Dougie Crawford	19.1	693	706.1	729.7	732.3	
Labour	Bryan Pottinger	15.4	559	870.9	947.9		
Conservative	Peter Smaill	7.8	283	293.9			
Electorate: 9,288 Valid: 3,626 Spoilt: 68 Quota: 907 Turnout: 3,694 (39.04%)

== Post-Election Changes ==
- † Midlothian East Independent and former Labour Cllr Peter Boyes resigned due to ill-health on 11 August 2014. A by-election was held on 27 November 2014 and was won by Labour's Kenny Young.
- †† Midlothian West SNP Cllr Owen Thompson was elected as an MP for Midlothian on 7 May 2015. He resigned as Leader of Midlothian Council on 23 June 2015 and announced he would resign his Council seat with effect from 1 July 2015. A by-election was held to fill the vacancy on 10 September 2015 and the seat was held by the SNP's Kelly Parry.

== By-elections ==
Midlothian East By-election (27 November 2014) – 1 Seat
Party	Candidate	FPv%	Count				
Party	Candidate	FPv%	1	2	3	4	5
Labour	Kenny Young	32.9%	1,294	1,310	1,343	1,443	1,682
SNP	Colin Cassidy	32.1%	1,260	1,270	1,357	1,384	1,613
Independent	Robert Hogg	19.8%	780	789	831	914	
Conservative	Andrew Hardie	8.4%	331	342	359		
Green	Bill Kerr-Smith	5.0%	197	210			
Liberal Democrats	Euan Davidson	1.7%	68				
Electorate: 11,637 Valid: 3,930 Spoilt: 40 Quota: 1,966 Turnout: 3,970 (34.1%)

Midlothian West By-election (10 September 2015) – 1 Seat
Party	Candidate	FPv%	Count		
Party	Candidate	FPv%	1	2	3
SNP	Kelly Parry	43.2%	1,540	1,558	1,701
Labour	Ian Miller	26.5%	945	977	1,082
Conservative	Pauline Winchester	14.7%	524	570	618
Green	Daya Feldwick	10.4%	372	420	
Liberal Democrats	Jane Davidson	4.5%	162		
Independent	David Tedford	0.7%	25		
Electorate: 11,582 Valid: 3,568 Spoilt: 49 Quota: 1,785 Turnout: 3,617 (31.2%)
