= East Lothian Coast and Lammermuirs =

Constituency of the Scottish Parliament

- County constituency for the Scottish Parliament
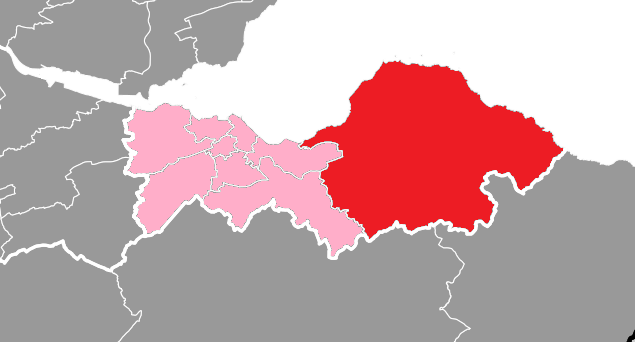

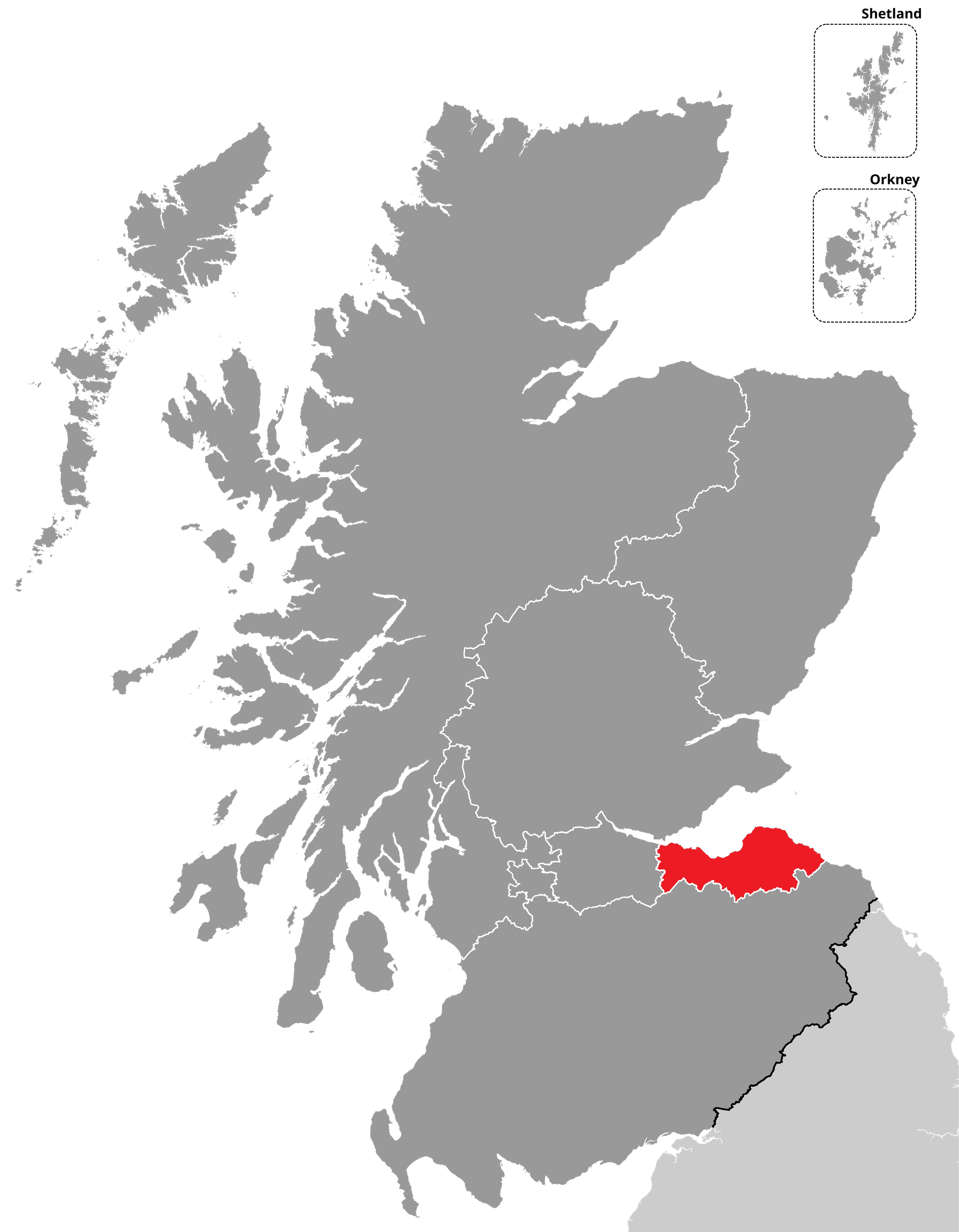
- East Lothian Coast and Lammermuirs shown within the Edinburgh and Lothians East electoral region, and the region shown within Scotland
- Electoral region: Edinburgh and Lothians East
- Electorate: 59,781 (2026)
- Major settlements: Haddington, North Berwick

Current constituency
- Created: 2026
- Seats: 1
- Party: Scottish National Party
- MSP: Paul McLennan
- Council area: East Lothian
- Created from: East Lothian

East Lothian Coast and Lammermuirs is a county constituency of the Scottish Parliament which elects one Member of the Scottish Parliament (MSP) by the first past the post method of election. Under the additional-member electoral system used for elections to the Scottish Parliament, it is also one of nine constituencies in the Edinburgh and Lothians East electoral region, which elects seven additional members, in addition to the nine constituency MSPs, to produce a form of proportional representation for the region as a whole.

The seat was created for the 2026 Scottish Parliament election by the second periodic review of Scottish Parliament boundaries. It covers most of the former East Lothian seat, which had grown too large compared to other seats and therefore required to be redrawn. Its name refers to the coast of East Lothian and the Lammermuir Hills.

The seat has been held by Paul McLennan of the Scottish National Party since the 2026 Scottish Parliament election. McLennan had previously been the member for the East Lothian constituency.

== Electoral region ==
The other eight constituencies of the Edinburgh and Lothians East region are Edinburgh Central, Edinburgh Eastern, Musselburgh and Tranent, Edinburgh North Eastern and Leith, Edinburgh North Western, Edinburgh Northern, Edinburgh Southern, Edinburgh South Western and Midlothian North. The region includes all of the City of Edinburgh and East Lothian council areas, and parts of the Midlothian council area.

== Constituency boundaries and council area ==
East Lothian Coast and Lammermuirs lies entirely within the East Lothian council area. The remainder of East Lothian forms part of the Edinburgh Eastern, Musselburgh and Tranent, which also includes parts of Edinburgh. The following East Lothian Council electoral wards were used to define the seat during the second review of Scottish Parliament boundaries:

- In full:
  - Preston, Seton and Gosford
  - North Berwick Coastal
  - Haddington and Lammermuir
  - Dunbar and East Linton
- In part:
  - Tranent, Wallyford and Macmerry (shared with Edinburgh Eastern, Musselburgh and Tranent)

== Member of the Scottish Parliament ==
Election	Member	Party
2026	Paul McLennan	Scottish National Party

== Election results ==
=== 2020s ===
2026 Scottish Parliament election: East Lothian Coast and Lammermuirs (Note: Note that changes in vote share are shown with respect to the notional result of the 2021 election, calculated to account for boundary changes)
Party	Candidate	Constituency			List		
Party	Candidate	Votes	%	±%	Votes	%	±%
SNP	Paul McLennan (Note: Incumbent member for the East Lothian constituency)	11,677	32.7	▼6.7	7,520	21.0	▼12.8
Labour	Martin Whitfield (Note: Incumbent member on the party list, or for another constituency)	11,259	31.6	▼4.1	8,000	22.4	▼2.0
Conservative	Miles Briggs	4,719	13.2	▼8.0	5,489	15.4	▼10.5
Reform	Nigel Douglas	4,611	12.9	New	4,702	13.2	▲13.0
Liberal Democrats	Tim McKay	2,802	7.9	▲4.2	2,805	7.8	▲4.3
Independent	Morgwn Davies	597	1.7	New	160	0.4	
Green					5,409	15.1	▲6.8
Animal Welfare					302	0.8	
Independent Green Voice					227	0.6	0.0
Edinburgh & East Lothian People					199	0.6	
Independent	Ash Regan (Note: Regan was the incumbent member for the Edinburgh Eastern constituency, having initially been elected as a member of the SNP)				155	0.4	
Scottish Family					149	0.4	0.0
AtLS					148	0.4	
Independent	Jeremy Balfour (Note: Balfour was an incumbent member on the regional list, having initially been elected as a member of the Conservatives)				103	0.3	
ISP					89	0.2	
Scottish Socialist					78	0.2	
Independent	Bonnie Prince Bob				59	0.2	
Communist					47	0.1	
Advance UK					36	0.1	
Workers Party					32	0.1	
Scottish Libertarian					29	0.1	0.0
Equality					14	0.0	
Majority		418	1.1	▼1.4			
Valid votes		35,665			35,752		
Invalid votes		641			63		
Turnout		36,306	59.9	▼9.2	35,815	59.1	
SNP win (new boundaries)							

== See also ==
- List of Scottish Parliament constituencies and electoral regions (2026–)

== See also ==
- List of Scottish Parliament constituencies and electoral regions (2026–)
