= East Lothian (Scottish Parliament constituency) =

Region or constituency of the Scottish Parliament

- Former county constituency for the Scottish Parliament

- East Lothian shown within the South Scotland electoral region and the region shown within Scotland
- Population: 79,505 (2019)

Former constituency
- Created: 1999
- Abolished: 2026
- Council area: East Lothian
- Replaced by: East Lothian Coast and Lammermuirs, Edinburgh Eastern, Musselburgh and Tranent

East Lothian (/ˈloʊðiən/; Scots: Aest Lowden; Scottish Gaelic: Lodainn an Ear) was a constituency of the Scottish Parliament (Holyrood) covering most of the council area of East Lothian. It elected one Member of the Scottish Parliament (MSP) by the plurality (first past the post) method of election. It was also one of nine constituencies in the South Scotland electoral region, which elects seven additional members, in addition to the nine constituency MSPs, to produce a form of proportional representation for the region as a whole.

The seat had been held by Paul McLennan from the Scottish National Party since the 2021 Scottish Parliament election.

As a result of the second periodic review of Scottish Parliament boundaries in 2025, the constituency was abolished from the 2026 Scottish Parliament election. Most of the area would form the new constituency of East Lothian Coast and Lammermuirs, whilst the Tranent area would be added to the new constituency of Edinburgh Eastern, Musselburgh and Tranent.

== Electoral region ==
The other eight constituencies of the South Scotland region are: Ayr, Carrick, Cumnock and Doon Valley, Clydesdale, Dumfriesshire, Ettrick, Roxburgh and Berwickshire, Galloway and West Dumfries, Kilmarnock and Irvine Valley and Midlothian South, Tweeddale and Lauderdale.

The region covers the Dumfries and Galloway council area, part of the East Ayrshire council area, part of the East Lothian council area, part of the Midlothian council area, the Scottish Borders council area, the South Ayrshire council area and part of the South Lanarkshire council area.

== Constituency boundaries and council area ==
Map of boundaries from 2011

The East Lothian constituency was created at the same time as the Scottish Parliament, in 1999, with the name and boundaries of an existing Westminster constituency. In 2005, however, Scottish Westminster (House of Commons) constituencies were mostly replaced with new constituencies. Following their first Periodic Review into Scottish Parliament constituencies, the Boundary Commission for Scotland recommended the formation of a modified East Lothian, with the Musselburgh electorate wards part of a redrawn Midlothian North and Musselburgh constituency, which was first used for the 2011 Scottish Parliament election.

The Holyrood constituency covered most of the East Lothian council area. The remainder was represented by the Midlothian North and Musselburgh constituency.

East Lothian was formed from the electoral wards listed below. All of these wards are part of East Lothian Council.

- In full: Dunbar and East Linton, Haddington and Lammermuir, North Berwick Coastal, Preston, Seton and Gosford
- In part: Tranent/Wallyford/Macmerry (shared with Midlothian North and Musselburgh constituency)

== Member of the Scottish Parliament ==
Election	Member	Party
1999	John Home Robertson	Labour
2007	Iain Gray	Labour
2021	Paul McLennan	SNP

== Election results ==
=== 2020s ===
2021 Scottish Parliament election: East Lothian
Party	Candidate	Constituency			Regional		
Party	Candidate	Votes	%	±%	Votes	%	±%
SNP	Paul McLennan	17,968	39.2	▲4.4	15,498	33.8	▲0.3
Labour	Martin Whitfield (Note: Elected on the party list)	16,789	36.7	▼1.1	11,207	24.4	▼2.0
Conservative	Craig Hoy	9,470	20.7	▼3.2	11,864	25.9	▼1.9
Green					3,801	8.3	▲1.5
Liberal Democrats	Euan Davidson	1,566	3.4	▼0.1	1,611	3.5	▲0.2
Alba					552	1.2	New
All for Unity					481	1.0	New
Independent Green Voice					278	0.6	New
Scottish Family					196	0.4	New
Abolish the Scottish Parliament					96	0.2	New
Freedom Alliance (UK)					84	0.2	New
Reform					77	0.2	New
UKIP					59	0.1	▼1.5
Scottish Libertarian					51	0.1	New
Vanguard Party (UK)					9	0.0	New
Scotia Future					8	0.0	New
Valid votes		45,793			45,872		
Invalid votes		138			58		
Majority		1,179	2.5	N/A			
Turnout		45,931	69.1	▲6.6	45,930	69.1	▲6.6
SNP gain from Labour		Swing		▲2.8			
Notes

This was the only SNP gain from Labour at the 2021 Scottish Parliament election.

=== 2010s ===
2016 Scottish Parliament election: East Lothian
Party	Candidate	Constituency			Regional		
Party	Candidate	Votes	%	±%	Votes	%	±%
Labour	Iain Gray (Note: Incumbent member for this constituency)	14,329	37.8	▼1.2	10,020	26.4	▼5.2
SNP	Douglas-James Johnston-Smith	13,202	34.8	▼3.7	12,729	33.5	▼4.1
Conservative	Rachael Hamilton (Note: Incumbent member on the party list, or for another constituency)	9,045	23.9	▲7.3	10,570	27.8	▲11.9
Green					2,580	6.8	▲2.1
Liberal Democrats	Ettie Spencer	1,337	3.5	▼2.4	1,242	3.3	▼1.8
UKIP					590	1.6	▲0.6
Solidarity					108	0.3	▲0.2
Clydesdale and South Scotland Independent					71	0.2	New
RISE					70	0.2	New
Majority		1,127	3.0	▲2.5			
Valid votes		37,913			37,980		
Invalid votes		118			47		
Turnout		38,031	62.5	▲5.2	38,027	62.5	▲5.2
Labour hold		Swing					
Notes

2011 Scottish Parliament election: East Lothian
Party	Candidate	Constituency			Regional		
Party	Candidate	Votes	%	±%	Votes	%	±%
Labour	Iain Gray (Note: Incumbent member for this constituency)	12,536	39.0	N/A	10,189	31.6	N/A
SNP	David Berry	12,385	38.5	N/A	12,101	37.6	N/A
Conservative	Derek Brownlee (Note: Incumbent member on the party list, or for another constituency)	5,344	16.6	N/A	5,131	15.9	N/A
Liberal Democrats	Ettie Spencer	1,912	5.9	N/A	1,643	5.1	N/A
Green					1,520	4.7	N/A
All-Scotland Pensioners Party					452	1.4	N/A
Socialist Labour					377	1.2	N/A
UKIP					312	1.0	N/A
Scottish Christian					198	0.6	N/A
BNP					174	0.5	N/A
Scottish Socialist					73	0.2	N/A
Solidarity					24	0.1	N/A
Majority		151	0.5	N/A			
Valid votes		32,177			32,194		
Invalid votes		117			71		
Turnout		32,294	57.3	N/A	32,265	57.3	N/A
Labour win (new boundaries)							

=== 2000s ===
2007 Scottish Parliament election: East Lothian
Party	Candidate	Votes	%	±%
Labour	Iain Gray	12,219	35.4	−8.5
SNP	Andrew Sharp	9,771	28.4	+11.8
Liberal Democrats	Judy Hayman	6,249	18.1	+1.4
Conservative	Bill Stevenson	6,232	18.1	+0.6
Majority		2,448	7.0	−19.2
Turnout		34,471	56.2	+3.5
Labour hold		Swing		

2003 Scottish Parliament election: East Lothian
Party	Candidate	Votes	%	±%
Labour	John Home Robertson	13,683	43.9	−7.2
Liberal Democrats	Judy Hayman	5,508	17.7	+6.7
Conservative	Stuart Thomson	5,459	17.5	+1.7
SNP	Tom Roberts	5,174	16.6	−5.4
Scottish Socialist	Hugh Kerr	1,380	4.4	New
Majority		8,175	26.2	−2.9
Turnout		31,204	52.7	−11.5
Labour hold		Swing		

=== 1990s ===
1999 Scottish Parliament election: East Lothian
Party	Candidate	Votes	%	±%
Labour	John Home Robertson	19,220	51.1	N/A
SNP	Calum Millar	8,274	22.0	N/A
Conservative	Christine Richards	5,941	15.8	N/A
Liberal Democrats	Judy Hayman	4,147	11.0	N/A
Majority		10,946	29.1	N/A
Turnout		37,582	72.2	N/A
Labour win (new seat)				
