= East Lothian Council elections =

Local government elections in East Lothian, Scotland

East Lothian Council in Scotland holds elections every five years, previously holding them every four years from its creation as a single-tier authority in 1995 to 2007.

== Council elections ==
=== As a district council ===
Year	Labour	SNP	Conservative	Independent
1974	10	0	6	1
1977	9	0	8	0
1980	10	0	7	0
1984 (Note: New ward boundaries.)	12	0	5	0
1988	12	0	4	1 (Note: Independent Labour.)
1992	9	1	7	0

=== As a unitary authority ===
Year	Labour	SNP	Conservative	Green	Liberal Democrats	Independent
1995	15	0	3	0	0	0
1999 (Note: New ward boundaries.)	17	1	5	0	0	0
2003	17	1	4	0	1	0
2007 (Note: Change to single transferable vote system and new ward boundaries.)	7	7	2	0	6	1
2012	10	9	3	0	0	1
2017 (Note: New ward boundaries.)	9	6	7	0	0	0
2022	9	7	4	1	0	1

== Results maps ==
1995 results map

1999 results map

2003 results map

2007 results map

2012 results map

2017 results map

2022 results map

== By-elections ==
=== 2017-2022 ===
Haddington and Lammermuir By-Election 9 May 2019
Party	Candidate	FPv%	Count				
Party	Candidate	FPv%	1	2	3	4	5
Conservative	Craig Hoy	35.0	2,212	2,249	2,428	2,759	3,277
SNP	Lorraine Glass	29.5	1,866	1,874	2,044	2,469	
Labour	Neal Black	21.5	1,359	1,370	1,589		
Liberal Democrats	Stuart Crawford	12.3	774	782			
UKIP	David Sisson	1.7	108				
Conservative hold							
Valid: 6,319 Spoilt: 44 Quota: 3,160 Turnout: 6,363

Preston, Seton and Gosford By-Election 20 January 2022
Party	Candidate	FPv%	Count				
Party	Candidate	FPv%	1	2	3	4	5
Labour	Colin Yorkston	38.5	1,793	1,815	1,861	1,927	2,390
SNP	Janis Wilson	26.2	1,217	1,242	1,258	1,391	1,458
Conservative	Andy Ovens	24.8	1,154	1,173	1,204	1,212	
Scottish Green	Tim Porteus	5.p	231	241	266		
Liberal Democrats	Ben Morse	2.9	136	154			
Independent	Calum Miller	2.6	122				
Labour hold							
Valid: 4,696 Spoilt: 43 Quota: 2,327 Turnout: 4,739
