= Midlothian North and Musselburgh =

Region or constituency of the Scottish Parliament

- Former county constituency for the Scottish Parliament

- Midlothian North and Musselburgh shown within the Lothian electoral region and the region shown within Scotland
- Population: 85,799 (2019)

Former constituency
- Created: 2011
- Abolished: 2026
- Council area: Midlothian; East Lothian
- Created from: East Lothian, Edinburgh East & Musselburgh, Tweeddale, Ettrick and Lauderdale, Midlothian
- Replaced by: Midlothian North, Edinburgh Eastern, Musselburgh and Tranent

Midlothian North and Musselburgh was a constituency of the Scottish Parliament covering parts of the council areas of Midlothian and East Lothian. Under the additional-member system used for elections to the Scottish Parliament, the seat elected one Member of the Scottish Parliament (MSP) by the plurality (first past the post) method of election, and was also one of nine constituencies in the Lothian electoral region, which elected seven additional members, in addition to the nine constituency MSPs, to produce a form of proportional representation for the region as a whole. It was created ahead of the 2011 Scottish Parliament election, and covered areas that were formerly part of the constituencies of Midlothian and Edinburgh East & Musselburgh, both of which were abolished.

As a result of the second periodic review of Scottish Parliament boundaries in 2025, the constituency was abolished ahead of the 2026 Scottish Parliament election. Most of the area became part of the new constituency of Midlothian North, whilst the Musselburgh area was added to the new constituency of Edinburgh Eastern, Musselburgh and Tranent.

Midlothian North and Musselburgh was held by Colin Beattie of the Scottish National Party for the entire duration of its existence (2011-2026).

== Electoral region ==
During the period Midlothian North and Musselburgh was in existence, the other eight constituencies of the Lothian region were: Almond Valley, Edinburgh Central, Edinburgh Eastern, Edinburgh Northern and Leith, Edinburgh Pentlands, Edinburgh Southern, Edinburgh Western and Linlithgow. During this period, the region included all of the City of Edinburgh council area, parts of the East Lothian council area, parts of the Midlothian council area and all of the West Lothian council area.

The Lothian electoral region was also abolished as a result of second periodic review, with the area covered now mostly forming parts of the new Edinburgh and Lothians East and Central Scotland and Lothians West regions, with a small portion also being transferred to the South Scotland region.

== Constituency boundaries and council area ==
Map of boundaries from 2011

During the period Midlothian North and Musselburgh was in existence, Midlothian was represented by two constituencies in the Scottish Parliament, these being Midlothian North and Musselburgh and Midlothian South, Tweeddale and Lauderdale, the latter was part of the South Scotland region. Part of the constituency was within the East Lothian council area, the remainder of which was represented by the East Lothian constituency (also within the South Scotland region).

Midlothian North and Musselburgh was created ahead of the 2011 Scottish Parliament election, combining areas that were formerly in the constituencies of Edinburgh East & Musselburgh, Tweeddale, Ettrick and Lauderdale, and Midlothian. Created as a result of the first periodic review of Scottish Parliament boundaries, the constituency was defined using the following electoral wards:

- Midlothian Council wards:
  - Bonnyrigg (entire ward)
  - Dalkeith (entire ward)
  - Midlothian East (entire ward)
  - Midlothian West (shared with the Midlothian South, Tweeddale and Lauderdale constituency)
- East Lothian Council wards:
  - Musselburgh (entire ward)
  - Tranent/Wallyford/Macmerry (shared with the East Lothian constituency)

== Member of the Scottish Parliament ==
Election	Member	Party
2011	Colin Beattie	SNP

== Election results ==
=== 2020s ===
2021 Scottish Parliament election: Midlothian North and Musselburgh
Party	Candidate	Constituency			Regional		
Party	Candidate	Votes	%	±%	Votes	%	±%
SNP	Colin Beattie (Note: Incumbent member for this constituency)	21,165	49.7	▲0.8	17,620	41.2	▲0.4
Labour	Stephen Curran	13,259	31.1	▲2.5	10,212	23.9	▼3.3
Conservative	Iain Whyte	6,529	15.3	▼2.8	7,723	18.1	▼0.4
Green					3,800	8.9	▲1.6
Liberal Democrats	Charles Dundas	1,630	3.8	▼0.7	1,372	3.2	▲0.5
Alba					645	1.5	New
Animal Welfare					285	0.7	New
All for Unity					278	0.6	New
Scottish Family					216	0.5	New
Women's Equality					116	0.3	▼0.4
Abolish the Scottish Parliament					101	0.2	New
Reform					81	0.2	New
Scottish Libertarian					79	0.2	New
Communist					69	0.2	New
Freedom Alliance (UK)					69	0.2	New
UKIP					57	0.1	▼2.0
Independent	Ashley Graczyk				34	0.1	New
SDP					19	0.0	New
Renew					7	0.0	New
Majority		7,906	18.6	▼1.7			
Valid votes		42,583			42,783		
Invalid votes		159			92		
Turnout		42,742	61.7	▲6.7	42,875	61.9	▲6.9
SNP hold		Swing					

=== 2010s ===
2016 Scottish Parliament election: Midlothian North and Musselburgh
Party	Candidate	Constituency			Region		
Party	Candidate	Votes	%	±%	Votes	%	±%
SNP	Colin Beattie (Note: Incumbent member for this constituency)	16,948	48.9	▲1.7	14,208	40.8	▼2.2
Labour	Bernard Harkins	9,913	28.6	▼8.6	9,455	27.2	▼4.0
Conservative	Jeremy Balfour (Note: Elected on the party list)	6,267	18.1	▲9.6	6,425	18.5	▲10.9
Green					2,530	7.3	▲3.6
Liberal Democrats	Jacquie Bell	1,557	4.5	▲0.3	951	2.7	▼0.1
UKIP					718	2.1	▲1.5
Women's Equality					250	0.7	New
Solidarity					171	0.5	▲0.4
RISE					104	0.3	New
Majority		7,035	20.3	▲10.3			
Valid votes		34,685			34,812		
Invalid votes		140			53		
Turnout		34,825	55.0	▲3.7	34,865	55.0	▲3.7
SNP hold		Swing					
Notes

2011 Scottish Parliament election: Midlothian North and Musselburgh
Party	Candidate	Constituency			Region		
Party	Candidate	Votes	%	±%	Votes	%	±%
SNP	Colin Beattie	14,079	47.2	N/A	12,821	43.0	N/A
Labour	Bernard Harkins	11,083	37.2	N/A	9,297	31.2	N/A
Conservative	Scott Douglas	2,541	8.5	N/A	2,274	7.6	N/A
Independent	Margo MacDonald (Note: Incumbent member on the party list, or for another constituency)				1,963	6.6	N/A
Green					1,105	3.7	N/A
Liberal Democrats	Ian Younger	1,254	4.2	N/A	844	2.8	N/A
Independent	Alan Hay	861	2.9	N/A			
All-Scotland Pensioners Party					400	1.3	N/A
Socialist Labour					297	1.0	N/A
BNP					238	0.8	N/A
UKIP					190	0.6	N/A
Scottish Christian					104	0.3	N/A
Scottish Socialist					85	0.3	N/A
CPA					77	0.3	N/A
Liberal					61	0.2	N/A
Solidarity					34	0.1	N/A
Independent	Ken O'Neil				17	0.1	N/A
Independent	David Hogg				15	0.0	N/A
Independent	Mev Brown				10	0.0	N/A
Majority		2,996	10.0	N/A			
Valid votes		29,818			29,832		
Invalid votes		98			109		
Turnout		29,916	51.3	N/A	29,941	51.3	N/A
SNP win (new seat)							
