= Dunbar and East Linton (ward) =

Electoral ward in East Lothian, Scotland

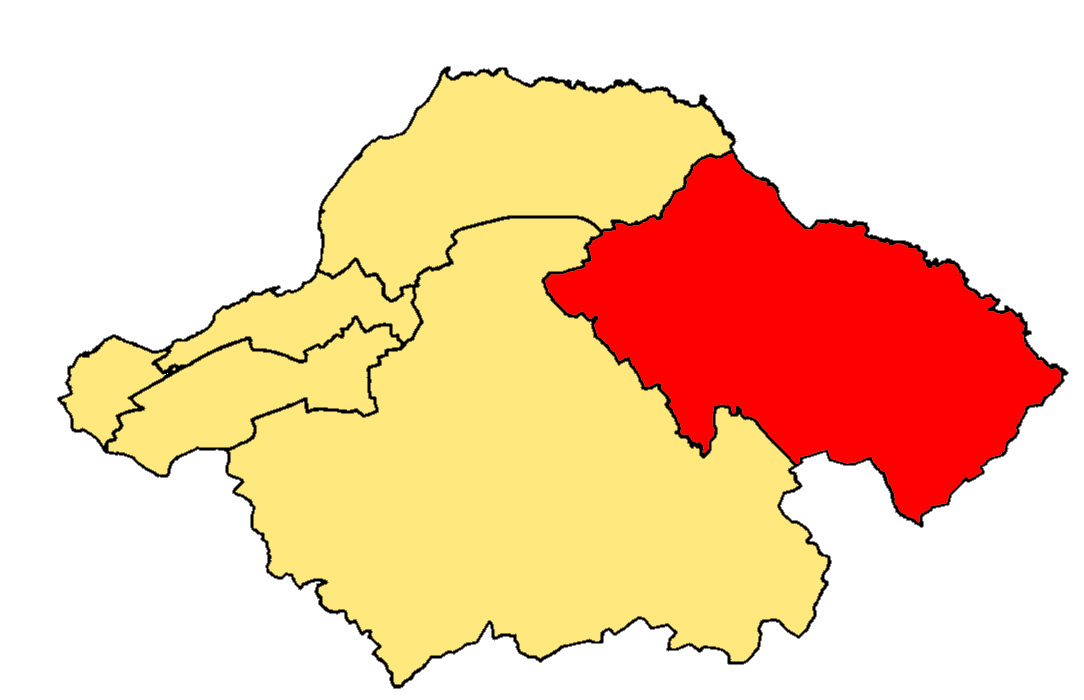
Location of the ward

Dunbar and East Linton is one of the six wards used to elect members of the East Lothian Council. It elects three Councillors.

== Councillors ==
Election	Councillors		
2007	Jacquie Bell (Liberal Democrats)	Paul McLennan (SNP)	Norman Hampshire (Labour)
2012	Michael George Veitch (Conservative)	Paul McLennan (SNP)	Norman Hampshire (Labour)
2017	Sue Kempson (Conservative)	Paul McLennan (SNP)	Norman Hampshire (Labour)
2022	Donna Collins (Conservative)	Lyn Jardine (SNP)	Norman Hampshire (Labour)

== Election results ==
=== 2017 Election ===
2017 East Lothian Council election

Dunbar and East Linton - 3 seats
Party	Candidate	FPv%	Count					
Party	Candidate	FPv%	1	2	3	4	5	6
Conservative	Sue Kempson	29.86	1,834					
Labour	Norman Hampshire (incumbent)	26.59	1,633					
SNP	Paul McLennan (incumbent)	17.04	1,047	1,054	1,064	1,094	1,199	2,216
SNP	Isobel Knox	13.2	811	819	828	852	1,177	
Green	Sarah Beattie-Smith	8.79	540	569	584	761		
Liberal Democrats	Elisabeth Wilson	4.49	276	392	421			
Electorate: 10,995 Valid: 6,141 Spoilt: 43 Quota: 1,536 Turnout: 56.4%

=== 2012 Election ===
2012 East Lothian Council election

Dunbar and East Linton - 3 seats
Party	Candidate	FPv%	Count				
Party	Candidate	FPv%	1	2	3	4	5
Labour	Norman Hampshire (incumbent)	25.49	1,191				
SNP	Paul Stewart McLennan (incumbent)	24.78	1,158	1,160	1,195		
Conservative	Michael George Veitch	21.04	983	983.8	1,072.9	1,074.7	1,185.9
SNP	Isobel Margaret Knox	14.04	656	657.1	681.1	702.7	805.1
Labour	Hayley Flanagan	9.50	444	460.1	516.3	517.3	
Liberal Democrats	Ann Burt Taylor	5.16	241	241.5			
Electorate: 9,760 Valid: 4,673 Spoilt: 71 Quota: 1,169 Turnout: 4,744 (47.88%)

=== 2007 Election ===
2007 East Lothian Council election

Dunbar and East Linton
Party	Candidate	FPv%	%	Seat	Count
SNP	Paul McLennan	1,726	30.0	1	1
Liberal Democrats	Jacquie Bell	1,136	19.8	3	3
Conservative	Katie Mackie	1,130	19.7		
Labour	Norman Hampshire	1,033	18.0	2	3
Labour	Herbert Coutts	725	12.6		
