= 2003 East Lothian Council election =

2003 Scottish local government election

- 1 May 2003

All 23 seats to East Lothian Council 12 seats needed for a majority
	First party	Second party
Leader	Norman Murray
Party	Labour	Conservative
Last election	17 seats, 45.2%	5 seats, 17.8%
Seats before	17	5
Seats won	17	4
Seat change	Steady	▼1
Popular vote	15,061	8,561
Percentage	40.6%	23.1%
Swing	▼4.6%	▲5.3%
	Third party	Fourth party
Party	SNP	Liberal Democrats
Last election	1 seat, 24.2%	0 seats, 12.8%
Seats before	1	0
Seats won	1	1
Seat change	Steady	▲1
Popular vote	7,132	5,503
Percentage	19.2%	14.9%
Swing	▼5.0%	▲2.1%
Council Leader before election
Norman Murray
Labour
Council Leader after election
Norman Murray
Labour

The 2003 East Lothian Council election was held on 1 May 2003, the same day as the other Scottish local government elections and the Scottish Parliament general election.

== Results ==
2003 East Lothian Council election result
Party	Seats	Gains	Losses	Net gain/loss	Seats %	Votes %	Votes	+/−
Labour	17	0	0	Steady	73.9	40.6	15,061	▼4.6
Conservative	4	0	1	▼1	17.4	23.1	8,561	▲5.3
SNP	1	0	0	Steady	4.3	19.2	7,132	▼5.0
Liberal Democrats	1	1	0	▲1	4.3	14.9	5,503	▲2.1
Scottish Socialist	0	0	0	Steady	0.0	1.6	589	New
Independent	0	0	0	Steady	0.0	0.6	210	New

== Results by ward (A-Z) ==
An asterisk (*) indicates an incumbent candidate.

Two asterisks (**) indicates an incumbent candidate standing for re-election in a different ward.

Aberlady/Gullane/Dirleton
Party	Candidate	Votes	%	±%
Conservative	Gilbert Meikle*	1,126	56.9	+8.4
Labour	Bernard Harkins	307	15.5	−1.4
Liberal Democrats	Robert Kane	304	15.4	+1.3
SNP	Ronald Purves	241	12.2	−8.3
Majority		819	41.4	+13.4
Turnout		1978	59.8	−10.9
Conservative hold		Swing		

Cockenzie & Port Seaton
Party	Candidate	Votes	%	±%
Labour	Margaret Libberton	906	47.3	−2.7
SNP	Alexander Campbell	413	21.6	−3.1
Conservative	Christopher Reynolds	371	19.4	−0.1
Liberal Democrats	Katharine Odling	131	6.8	+1.0
Scottish Socialist	Kenneth Munro	94	4.9	N/A
Majority		493	25.7	+0.4
Turnout		1915	56.7	−7.5
Labour hold		Swing		

Dunbar East
Party	Candidate	Votes	%	±%
Labour	Kevin Jarvie*	498	28.0	−9.4
SNP	Paul McLennan	473	26.6	+1.2
Conservative	Mark Neeham	446	25.0	+1.0
Liberal Democrats	Allan Wilson	273	15.3	+2.0
Scottish Socialist	Joanna Cockburn	91	5.1	N/A
Majority		25	1.4	−10.6
Turnout		1781	59.0	+0.5
Labour hold		Swing		

Dunbar/West Barns
Party	Candidate	Votes	%	±%
Labour	Norman Hampshire*	777	45.4	−7.3
Liberal Democrats	Stuart Ritchie	372	21.7	+8.9
SNP	June Addies	314	18.3	−0.3
Conservative	Michael Playfair	249	14.5	−1.4
Majority		405	23.7	−10.4
Turnout		1712	52.6	−11.6
Labour hold		Swing		

East Linton/Gifford
Party	Candidate	Votes	%	±%
Conservative	Ludovic Broun-Lindsay*	916	48.3	+4.0
Liberal Democrats	Alick Arnold	421	22.2	+8.7
Labour	Raymond McCabe	326	17.2	−9.7
SNP	Susan Swain	232	12.2	−3.1
Majority		495	26.1	+8.8
Turnout		1895	58.9	−8.5
Conservative hold		Swing		

Haddington Central
Party	Candidate	Votes	%	±%
Labour	Ann McCarthy*	580	37.5	−4.2
Liberal Democrats	Dominic Gray	364	23.5	+6.2
SNP	Norman Lawrie	321	20.7	−1.9
Conservative	Margaret Burn	282	18.2	−0.2
Majority		216	14.0	−5.2
Turnout		1547	48.3	−10.8
Labour hold		Swing		

Haddington East/Athelstaneford
Party	Candidate	Votes	%	±%
Labour	Charles Ingle*	707	46.2	−0.1
SNP	Thomas Trotter	361	23.6	−1.5
Liberal Democrats	Ann Taylor	198	12.9	−0.8
Conservative	Maureen Hall	186	12.1	−2.7
Scottish Socialist	Gary Galbraith	79	5.2	N/A
Majority		346	22.6	+1.4
Turnout		1531	49.0	−11.0
Labour hold		Swing		

Haddington West/Saltoun
Party	Candidate	Votes	%	±%
Liberal Democrats	Sheena Richardson	620	37.1	+8.3
Conservative	James Robertson	487	29.2	−2.5
Labour	William Watson	360	21.6	−0.8
SNP	John Donachy	203	12.2	−4.8
Majority		133	7.9	+5.0
Turnout		1670	56.7	−10.8
Liberal Democrats gain from Conservative		Swing		

Longniddry
Party	Candidate	Votes	%	±%
Conservative	Peter Ford*	1,184	60.4	+21.4
Labour	Iain Stewart	391	20.0	−14.6
SNP	Peter MacKenzie	276	14.1	−5.5
Liberal Democrats	Marion Provan	108	5.5	−1.4
Majority		793	40.4	+36.0
Turnout		1959	61.2	−8.9
Conservative hold		Swing		

Musselburgh Central
Party	Candidate	Votes	%	±%
Labour	Norman Murray*	638	39.2	−15.8
Liberal Democrats	Jennifer Mollison	635	39.0	+19.4
SNP	Duncan Clairmount	266	16.3	−9.0
Conservative	Norman Nash	90	5.5	N/A
Majority		3	0.2	−29.5
Turnout		1629	49.0	−10.9
Labour hold		Swing		

Musselburgh East
Party	Candidate	Votes	%	±%
Labour	Andrew Forrest	595	45.8	−9.8
SNP	Roger Knox	566	43.5	+11.4
Liberal Democrats	Rebecca Croft	76	5.8	−6.5
Conservative	Julian Nettlefold	63	4.8	N/A
Majority		29	2.3	−21.1
Turnout		1300	45.7	−13.7
Labour hold		Swing		

Musselburgh North
Party	Candidate	Votes	%	±%
Labour	Maureen Talac*	744	51.3	−1.0
SNP	Malcolm Fleming	283	19.5	−3.4
Conservative	Robert Fairnie	200	13.8	−2.0
Liberal Democrats	Sarah Kurt-Elli	165	11.4	+2.4
Independent	Ross Carpenter	59	4.1	N/A
Majority		461	31.8	+2.4
Turnout		1451	49.4	−10.9
Labour hold		Swing		

Musselburgh West
Party	Candidate	Votes	%	±%
Labour	John Ross*	724	45.3	−4.4
SNP	John Williamson	345	21.6	−3.1
Conservative	Jane Fairnie	201	12.6	−2.5
Liberal Democrats	Martin Hayman	197	12.3	+1.8
Scottish Socialist	John Fraser	132	8.3	N/A
Majority		379	23.7	−1.3
Turnout		1599	48.9	−16.3
Labour hold		Swing		

North Berwick East
Party	Candidate	Votes	%	±%
SNP	David Berry*	723	44.0	+5.4
Conservative	Kathryn Smith	482	29.4	−2.1
Labour	Donald Shankie	258	15.7	−5.3
Liberal Democrats	Gillian Colston	179	10.9	+2.0
Majority		241	14.6	+7.5
Turnout		1642	55.5	−9.2
SNP hold		Swing		

North Berwick West
Party	Candidate	Votes	%	±%
Conservative	Neil Rankin	1,245	62.5	+26.6
Labour	Patrick Hanson	254	12.8	+0.5
Liberal Democrats	Stuart Smith	238	11.9	−10.3
SNP	Mary Lee	210	10.5	−19.0
Scottish Socialist	Hugh Kerr	45	2.3	N/A
Majority		991	49.7	+43.3
Turnout		1992	64.4	−6.9
Conservative hold		Swing		

Ormiston/Pencaitland
Party	Candidate	Votes	%	±%
Labour	David Costello*	845	50.6	+−0.0
SNP	Margaret Jones	351	21.0	−0.9
Liberal Democrats	Sheelagh Keddie	275	16.5	+4.4
Conservative	Norman Galbraith	199	11.9	−3.4
Majority		494	29.6	+0.9
Turnout		1670	53.1	−11.0
Labour hold		Swing		

Prestonpans East
Party	Candidate	Votes	%	±%
Labour	Patrick O'Brien*	1,130	73.7	+6.5
SNP	James Skinner	256	16.7	−10.5
Liberal Democrats	Joan Busby	93	6.1	+0.5
Conservative	Colin Beveridge	54	3.5	N/A
Majority		874	57.0	+17.1
Turnout		1533	52.5	−16.9
Labour hold		Swing		

Prestonpans West
Party	Candidate	Votes	%	±%
Labour	William Innes*	949	68.8	−2.0
Independent	George Watson	151	10.9	N/A
Scottish Socialist	William Taylor	148	10.7	N/A
Conservative	Hugh Mackay	68	4.9	N/A
Liberal Democrats	Christopher Middleton	64	4.6	−0.8
Majority		798	57.9	+10.8
Turnout		1380	49.5	−15.0
Labour hold		Swing		

Tranent/Elphinstone
Party	Candidate	Votes	%	±%
Labour	Robert McNeill	763	59.2	−2.3
SNP	Vincent Gordon	272	21.1	−1.0
Liberal Democrats	Linda Brown	133	10.3	+1.0
Conservative	Stuart Combe	120	9.3	+2.2
Majority		491	38.1	−1.3
Turnout		1288	44.1	−15.2
Labour hold		Swing		

Tranent/Macmerry
Party	Candidate	Votes	%	±%
Labour	Donald Grant*	824	63.7	+8.0
SNP	Peter Swain	232	17.9	−14.4
Conservative	Andrew Dalrymple	128	9.9	N/A
Liberal Democrats	Aydin Kurt-Elli	110	8.5	−3.5
Majority		592	45.8	+22.4
Turnout		1294	46.4	−13.3
Labour hold		Swing		

Tranent West
Party	Candidate	Votes	%	±%
Labour	Bishop Shepherd*	942	64.1	+4.7
Liberal Democrats	Brian Logan	247	16.8	−2.7
SNP	David Martin	197	13.4	−7.7
Conservative	Frances Broun-Lindsay	84	5.7	N/A
Majority		695	47.3	+9.0
Turnout		1470	48.3	−12.6
Labour hold		Swing		

Wallyford/Whitecraig
Party	Candidate	Votes	%	±%
Labour	Patrick O'Donnell*	706	54.6	−12.2
Conservative	John Robertson	233	18.0	N/A
SNP	Jean Cadger	230	17.8	−6.3
Liberal Democrats	Duncan Slater	123	9.5	+0.4
Majority		473	36.6	−6.1
Turnout		1292	44.2	−12.7
Labour hold		Swing		

== See also ==
- East Lothian Council elections
