= 1995 East Lothian Council election =

1995 Scottish local government election

- 6 April 1995

All 18 seats to East Lothian Council 10 seats needed for a majority
	First party	Second party
Leader	Norman Murray
Party	Labour	Conservative
Last election	9 seats	5 seats
Seats before	9	7
Seats won	15	3
Seat change	▲6	▼2
Popular vote	18,630	6,271
Percentage	56.0%	18.9%

The 1995 East Lothian Council election was held on 6 April 1995, the same day as the other Scottish local government elections.

== Results ==
1995 East Lothian Council election result
Party	Seats	Gains	Losses	Net gain/loss	Seats %	Votes %	Votes	+/−
Labour	15			▲6	83.3	56.0	18,630	
Conservative	3			▼2	16.7	18.9	6,271	
SNP	0				0.0	16.9	5,619	
Liberal Democrats	0				0.0	6.4	2,129	
Independent	0				0.0	1.6	537	
Other parties	0				0.0	0.2	62	

== Ward results ==
=== Labour ===
- Musselburgh South
- Musselburgh Northwest
- Musselburgh Central/Inveresk
- Musselburgh East/Pinkie
- Prestonpans West/Wallyford
- Prestonpans East
- Tranent West/Carberry
- Tranent East
- Ormiston/Pencaitland
- Cockenzie and Port Seaton
- Longniddry/Macmerry
- Haddington West
- Haddington Central
- Haddington East
- Tyninghame
- Dunbar

=== Conservative ===
- Aberlady/Direleton/Gullane
- East Linton/Gifford
- North Berwick

== See also ==
- East Lothian Council elections
