= Midlothian North =

Constituency of the Scottish Parliament

- County constituency for the Scottish Parliament
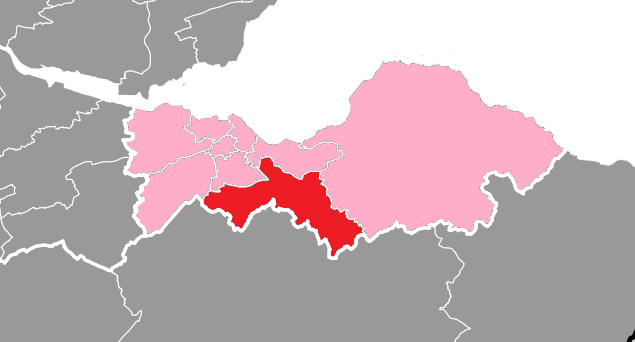

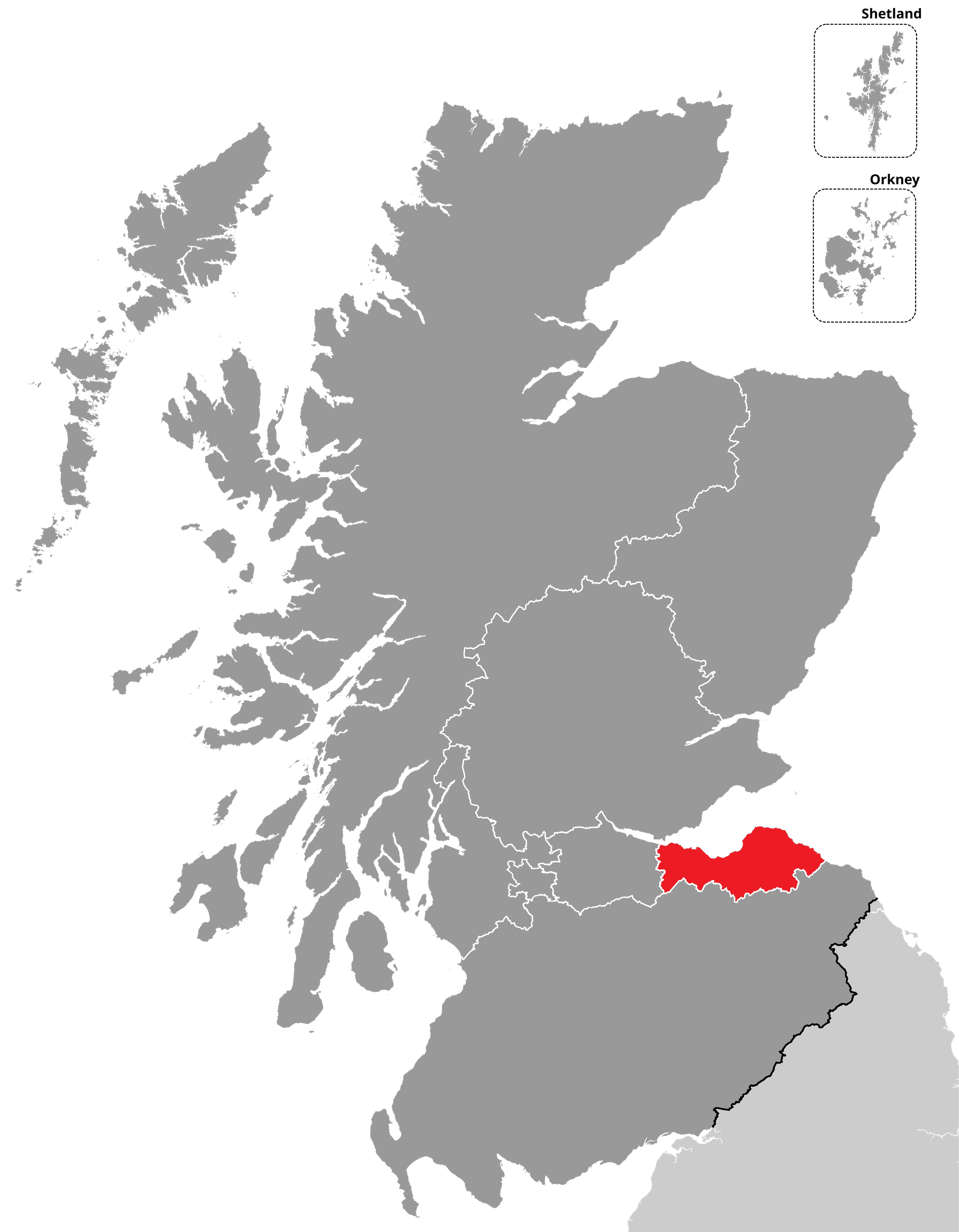
- Midlothian North shown within the Edinburgh and Lothians East electoral region, and the region shown within Scotland
- Electoral region: Edinburgh and Lothians East
- Electorate: 56,748 (2026)
- Major settlements: Dalkeith

Current constituency
- Created: 2026
- Seats: 1
- Party: Scottish National Party
- MSP: Colin Beattie
- Council area: Midlothian
- Created from: Midlothian North and Musselburgh

Midlothian North is a county constituency of the Scottish Parliament covering part of the council areas of Midlothian. It elects one Member of the Scottish Parliament (MSP) by the first past the post method of election. Under the additional-member electoral system used for elections to the Scottish Parliament, it is also one of nine constituencies in the Edinburgh and Lothians East electoral region, which will elect seven additional members, in addition to the nine constituency MSPs, to produce a form of proportional representation for the region as a whole. The seat was created by the second periodic review of Scottish Parliament boundaries ahead of the 2026 Scottish Parliament election, and covers areas that were previously in the former seat of Midlothian North and Musselburgh, alongside a small area gained from the seat of Midlothian South, Tweeddale and Lauderdale.

The seat has been represented by Colin Beattie of the Scottish National Party since being first contested in 2026. Beattie was the incumbent member for the Midlothian North and Musselburgh prior to this election.

== Electoral region ==
The other eight constituencies of the Edinburgh and Lothians East region are East Lothian Coast and Lammermuirs, Edinburgh Eastern, Musselburgh and Tranent, Edinburgh Central, Edinburgh Northern, Edinburgh North Western, Edinburgh North Eastern and Leith, Edinburgh South Western, and Edinburgh Southern. The region includes all of the City of Edinburgh and East Lothian council areas, and parts of the Midlothian council area.

== Constituency boundaries and council area ==
Midlothian is represented in the Scottish Parliament by two constituencies. The Midlothian North seat is entirely within the Midlothian council area, whilst the Midlothian South, Tweeddale and Lauderdale also includes parts of the Scottish Borders. Following the second periodic review of Scottish Parliament boundaries in 2025, the Midlothian North constituency covers the following electoral wards of Midlothian Council:

- Bonnyrigg (entire ward)
- Dalkeith (entire ward)
- Midlothian West (shared with Midlothian South, Tweeddale and Lauderdale)
- Midlothian East (entire ward)
- Midlothian South (shared with Midlothian South, Tweeddale and Lauderdale)

== Member of the Scottish Parliament ==
Election	Member	Party
2026	Colin Beattie	SNP

== Election results ==
=== 2020s ===
2026 Scottish Parliament election: Midlothian North (Note: Note that changes in vote share are shown with respect to the notional result of the 2021 election, calculated to account for boundary changes)
Party	Candidate	Constituency			Regional		
Party	Candidate	Votes	%	±%	Votes	%	±%
SNP	Colin Beattie (Note: Incumbent member for the Midlothian North and Musselburgh constituency)	11,250	38.9	▼10.3	7,680	26.5	
Labour	Caitlin Stott	8,754	30.3	▲0.3	6,685	23.1	
Reform	Pal Chidambaram	4,506	15.6	New	4,596	15.9	
Green					3,917	13.5	
Liberal Democrats	Jenny Butler	2,387	8.3	▲3.9	2,089	7.2	
Conservative	Phil Doggart	2,032	7.0	▼9.0	2,345	8.1	
Animal Welfare					278	1.0	
Independent Green Voice					251	0.9	
Independent	Jeremy Balfour (Note: Balfour was an incumbent member on the regional list, having initially been elected as a member of the Conservatives)				165	0.6	
AtLS					163	0.6	
Scottish Family					160	0.6	
Independent	Ash Regan (Note: Regan was the incumbent member for the Edinburgh Eastern constituency, having initially been elected as a member of the SNP)				135	0.5	
ISP					122	0.4	
Scottish Socialist					84	0.3	
Workers Party					59	0.2	
Independent	Bonnie Prince Bob				52	0.2	
Advance UK					48	0.2	
Edinburgh & East Lothian People					45	0.2	
Communist					25	0.1	
Equality					23	0.1	
Scottish Libertarian					22	0.1	
Independent	Morgwn Davies				2	0.0	
Majority		2,496	8.6				
Valid votes		28,929			28,946		
Invalid votes		136			87		
Turnout		29,065	51.2		29,044	51.2	
SNP win (new seat)							

== See also ==
- List of Scottish Parliament constituencies and electoral regions (2026–)
