= 1999 East Lothian Council election =

1999 Scottish local government election

- 6 May 1999

All 23 seats to East Lothian Council 12 seats needed for a majority
	First party	Second party	Third party
Leader	Norman Murray
Party	Labour	Conservative	SNP
Last election	15 seats, 56.0%	3 seats, 18.9%	0 seats,16.9%
Seats before	15	3	0
Seats won	17	5	1
Seat change	▲2	▲2	▲1
Popular vote	20,346	7,994	10,876
Percentage	45.2%	17.8%	24.2%
Swing	▼10.8%	▼1.1%	▲7.3%
Council Leader before election
Norman Murray
Labour
Council Leader after election
Norman Murray
Labour

The 1999 East Lothian Council election was held on 6 May 1999, the same day as the other Scottish local government elections and the Scottish Parliament general election.

== Results ==
1999 East Lothian Council election result
Party	Seats	Gains	Losses	Net gain/loss	Seats %	Votes %	Votes	+/−
Labour	17	-	-	▲2	73.9	45.2	20,346	▼10.8
Conservative	5	-	-	▲2	21.7	17.8	7,994	▼1.1
SNP	1	-	-	▲1	4.3	24.2	10,876	▲7.3
Liberal Democrats	0	-	-	Steady	0.0	12.8	7,753	▲6.4

== Ward results ==
=== Labour ===
- Musselburgh West
- Musselburgh South
- Musselburgh North
- Musselburgh Central
- Musselburgh East
- Wallyford/Whitecraig
- Prestonpans West
- Prestonpans East
- Cockenzie and Port Seaton
- Tranent West
- Tranent/Macmerry
- Tranent/Elphinestone
- Ormiston/Pencaitland
- Haddington Central
- Haddington East/Athelstaneford
- Dunbar/West Barns
- Dunbar East

=== Conservative ===
- Haddington West/Saltoun
- Longniddry
- Aberlady/Direleton/Gullane
- East Linton/Gifford
- North Berwick West

=== SNP ===
- North Berwick East

== See also ==
- East Lothian Council elections
