= Musselburgh (ward) =

Electoral ward in East Lothian, Scotland

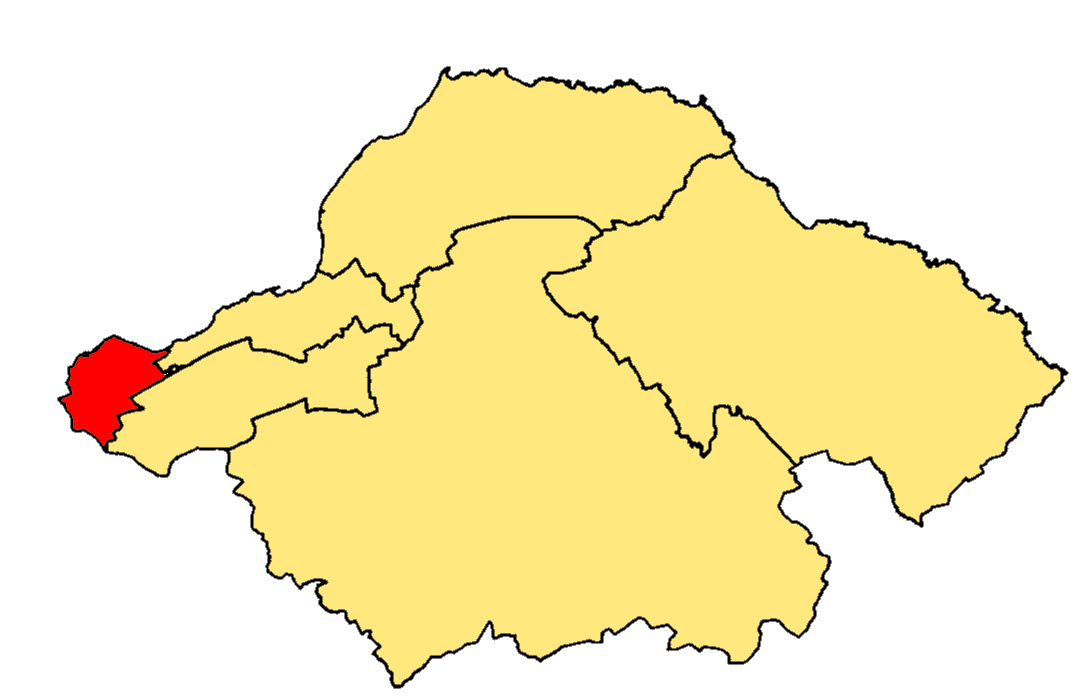
Location of the ward

Musselburgh is one of the six wards used to elect members of the East Lothian Council. It elects four Councillors.

== Councillors ==
Election	Councillors			
2017	Andrew Forrest (Labour)	Stuart Currie (SNP)	John Williamson (SNP)	Katie Mackie (Conservative)
2022	Andrew Forrest (Labour)	Cher Cassini (SNP)	Ruaridh Bennett (Labour)	Shona McIntosh (Green)

== Election results ==
=== 2022 election ===
Musselburgh − 4 seats
Party	Candidate	FPv%	Count							
Party	Candidate	FPv%	1	2	3	4	5	6	7	8
SNP	Cher Cassini	21.70	1,596							
Labour	Andrew Forrest (incumbent)	16.44	1,209	1,214	1,222	1,231	1,287	1,425	1,472	
Conservative	Katie Mackie (incumbent)	14.71	1,082	1,082	1,100	1,106	1,161	1,172	1,177	1,177
Labour	Ruaridh Bennett	14.60	1,074	1,078	1,081	1,091	1,160	1,234	1,276	1,276
Green	Shona Mcintosh	13.47	991	1,001	1,017	1,035	1,100	1,666		
SNP	Iain Whyte	12.63	929	1,022	1,026	1,056	1,075			
Liberal Democrats	Susan Butts	4.24	312	313	322	325				
Alba	Michelle Graham	1.14	84	85	92					
Scottish Family	Stephen Carter	1.07	79	79						
Electorate: 16,636 Valid: 7,356 Spoilt: 126 Quota: 1,472 Turnout: 45.0

=== 2017 election ===
2017 East Lothian Council election

Musselburgh - 4 seats
Party	Candidate	FPv%	Count								
Party	Candidate	FPv%	1	2	3	4	5	6	7	8	9
SNP	Stuart Currie (incumbent)	22.12	1,683								
Conservative	Katie Mackie	19.34	1,472	1,473	1,478	1,570					
Labour	Andy Forrest (incumbent)	15.48	1,178	1,187	1,192	1,266	1,274	1,362	1,924		
SNP	John Williamson (incumbent)	11.04	840	960	967	1,007	1,008	1,241	1,278	1,322	1,583
Independent	John Caldwell (incumbent)	10.56	804	809	843	896	907	985	1,015	1,107	
Labour	Katherine Sangster	7.47	568	570	579	637	644	742			
Green	Jason Rose	6.53	497	506	520	630	633				
Liberal Democrats	Clare Graham	6.17	470	473	487						
Independent	Theresa Sives	1.26	96	96							
Electorate: 15,874 Valid: 7,608 Spoilt: 139 Quota: 1,522 Turnout: 48.8
