= Haddington and Lammermuir (ward) =

Electoral ward in East Lothian, Scotland

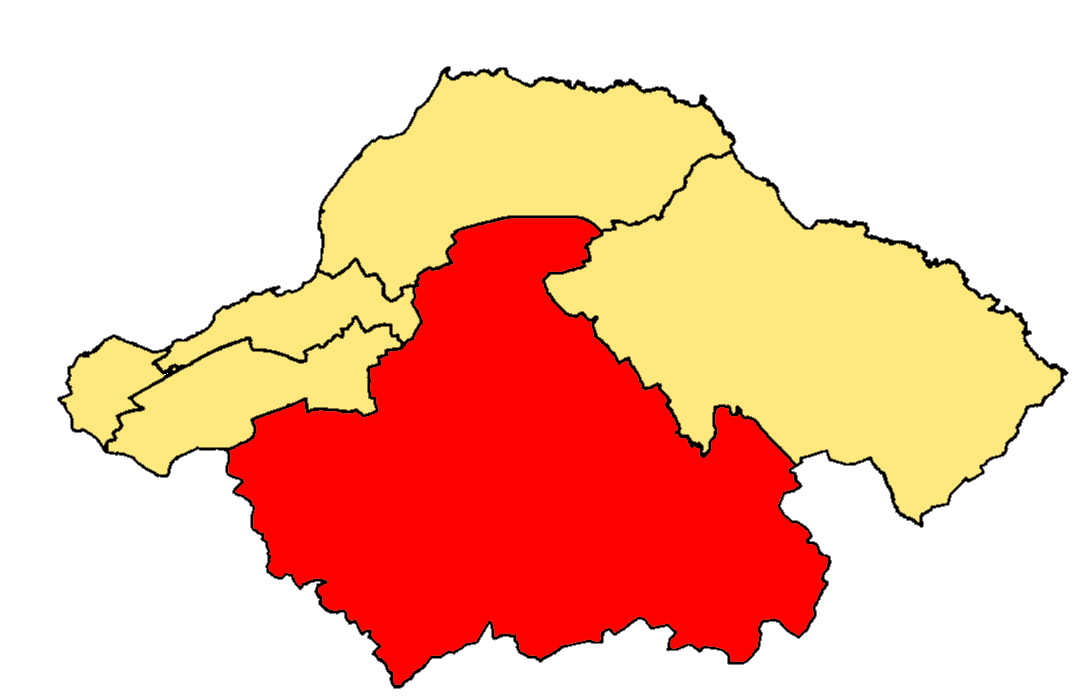
Location of the ward

Haddington and Lammermuir is one of the six wards used to elect members of the East Lothian Council. It elects four Councillors.

== Councillors ==
Election	Councillors			
2007	Sheena Richardson (Liberal Democrats)	Ludovic Broun-Lindsay (Conservative)	Tom Trotter (SNP)	3 seats
2012	John McMillan (Labour)	Ludovic Broun-Lindsay (Conservative)	Tom Trotter (SNP)	3 seats
2017	John McMillan (Labour)	Brian Small (Conservative)	Tom Trotter (SNP)	Shamin Akhtar (Labour)
2019 by	John McMillan (Labour)	Craig Hoy (Conservative)	Tom Trotter (SNP)	Shamin Akhtar (Labour)
2022	John McMillan (Labour)	George McGuire (Conservative)	Tom Trotter (SNP)	Shamin Akhtar (Labour)

== Election results ==
=== 2019 By-Election ===
Haddington and Lammermuir by-election 9 May 2019
Party	Candidate	FPv%	Count				
Party	Candidate	FPv%	1	2	3	4	5
Conservative	Craig Hoy	35.01	2,212	2,249	2,428	2,759	3,277
SNP	Lorraine Glass	29.53	1,866	1,874	2,044	2,469	
Labour	Neal Black	21.51	1,359	1,370	1,589		
Liberal Democrats	Stuart Crawford	12.25	774	782			
UKIP	David Sisson	1.71	108				
Electorate: 14,396 Valid: 6,319 Spoilt: 44 Quota: 3,160 Turnout: 44.2%

=== 2017 Election ===
2017 East Lothian Council election

Haddington and Lammermuir - 4 seats
Party	Candidate	FPv%	Count						
Party	Candidate	FPv%	1	2	3	4	5	6	7
Conservative	Brian Small†	29.03	2,262						
Labour	John McMillan (incumbent)	18.71	1,458	1593					
Labour	Shamin Akhtar (incumbent)	15.00	1,169	1,234	1,256	1,316	1,627		
SNP	Tom Trotter (incumbent)	14.66	1,142	1,153	1,155	1,236	1,327	1,333	2,227
SNP	Ruth Currie	11.41	889	894	895	947	1,007	1,017	
Liberal Democrats	Kelvin Pate	7.29	568	791	795	889			
Green	Cris Thacker	3.88	302	329	330				
Electorate: 14,095 Valid: 7,790 Spoilt: 108 Quota: 1,559 Turnout: 56%

=== 2012 Election ===
2012 East Lothian Council election

Haddington and Lammermuir - 3 seats
Party	Candidate	FPv%	Count					
Party	Candidate	FPv%	1	2	3	4	5	6
Labour	John McMillan	33.38	1,522					
SNP	Tom Trotter (incumbent)	26.74	1,219					
Conservative	Ludovic Broun-Lindsay (incumbent)	19.92	908	961.7	971.8	1,004	1,076.1	1,483.3
Liberal Democrats	Kelvin Logan Pate	13.38	610	723.2	743.9	755.9	867.7	
Independent	David Barrett	4.98	227	276.4	289.9	313.4		
UKIP	Oluf George Marshall	1.60	73	86.1	90			
Electorate: 9,948 Valid: 4,559 Spoilt: 38 Quota: 1,140 Turnout: 4,597 (45.83%)

=== 2007 Election ===
2007 East Lothian Council election

Haddington and Lammermuir
Party	Candidate	FPv%	%	Seat	Count
Conservative	Ludovic Broun-Lindsay	1,317	22.6	1	4
SNP	Tom Trotter	1,107	19.0	3	4
Liberal Democrats	Sheena Richardson	1,041	17.9	2	4
Independent	Charles Ingle	1,019	17.5		
Labour	Ann McCarthy	985	16.9		
Green	Eurig Scandrett	281	4.8		
Solidarity	Gary Galbraith	68	1.2		
