= Colin Beattie =

Scottish National Party politician

Colin Beattie MSP
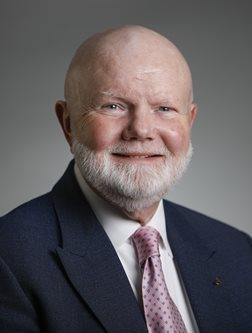
- Official portrait, 2026

Member of the Scottish Parliament for Midlothian North Midlothian North and Musselburgh (2011–2026)
- Incumbent
- Assumed office 5 May 2011
- Preceded by: Constituency established
- Majority: 2,496 (8.6%)

Personal details
- Born: 17 October 1951 (age 74) Forfar, Scotland
- Party: Scottish National Party
- Website: www.colinbeattiemsp.org

Colin Beattie (born 17 October 1951) is a Scottish National Party (SNP) politician. He has been the Member of the Scottish Parliament (MSP) for the Midlothian North constituency, including its predecessor Midlothian North and Musselburgh, since 2011. Prior to this role, he was a councillor and group leader of the SNP on Midlothian Council.

== Early career ==
For 23 years, Beattie worked as an international banker across the Middle East and Asia. He then decided after a period of working in London that he would return to living in Scotland with his wife, Lisa.

== Political career ==
Beattie took an early retirement in 2006 to focus on being elected to Midlothian Council. He was elected to represent Midlothian South in the 2007 Midlothian Council election and was SNP group leader on the council.

Beattie won the newly created seat of Midlothian North and Musselburgh in the 2011 Scottish Parliament election with a majority of just under 3000 votes. He retained his seat in the 2016 Scottish Parliament election, with a majority of over 7,000 votes. He was also the SNP National Treasurer from 2004 to 2020; he was defeated in the 2020 SNP internal elections by Douglas Chapman. However, when Chapman later resigned in May 2021, stating "I had not received the support or financial information required to carry out the fiduciary duties of National Treasurer", Beattie returned to the position.

He was selected unopposed as the SNP's candidate for the 2021 Scottish Parliament election and retained his seat, with an increased majority of 7,906.

Beattie was formally censured in 2013 by the Standards Commission for Scotland for breaching the Councillors’ code of Conduct for failing to register interest in property whilst a councillor.

In 2023, he was arrested during the police investigation into the SNP finances. He was later released without charge, but resigned as SNP treasurer the day after.

Beattie was elected for the new Midlothian North constituency at the 2026 Scottish Parliament election with a reduced majority.

== Personal life ==
Beattie is married to former Midlothian Council leader Lisa Beattie. He lives in Dalkeith, Midlothian.
