= North Berwick Coastal (ward) =

Electoral ward in East Lothian, Scotland

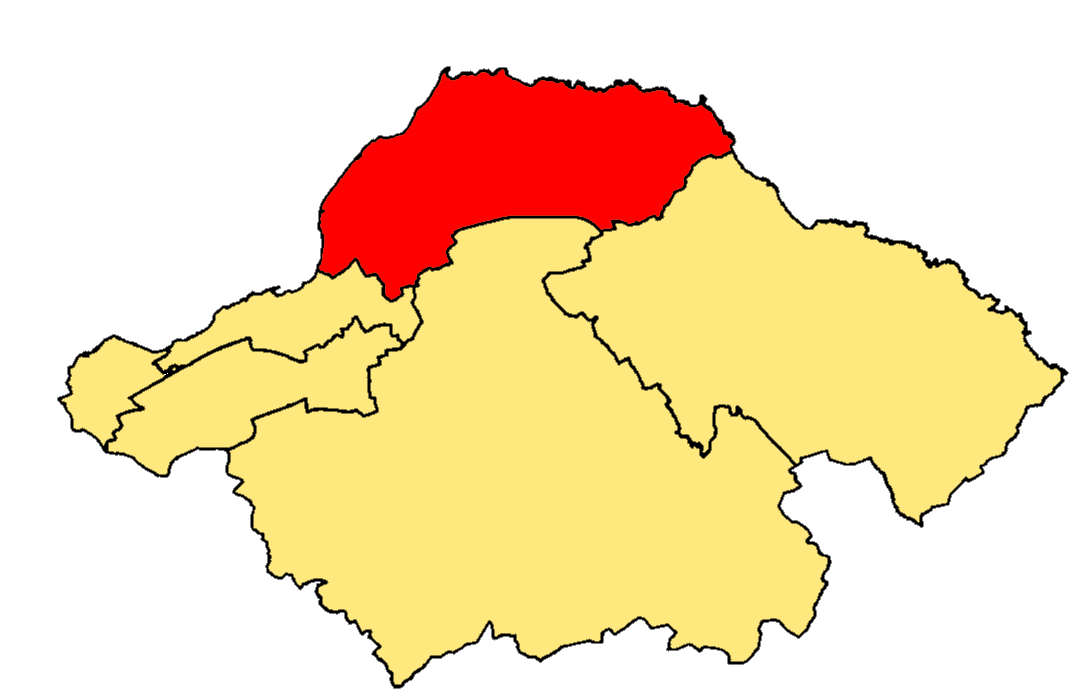
Location of the ward

North Berwick Coastal is one of the six wards used to elect members of the East Lothian Council. It elects three Councillors.

== Councillors ==
Election	Councillors		
2007	Stuart MacKinnon (Liberal Democrats)	Neil Rankin (Conservative)	David Berry (SNP)
2012	Jim Goodfellow (Labour)	Tim Day (Conservative)	David Berry (SNP)
2017	Jim Goodfellow (Labour)	Jeremy Douglas Findlay (Conservative)	Jane Henderson (Conservative)
2022	Carol McFarlane (Labour)	Jeremy Douglas Findlay (Conservative)	Liz Allan (SNP)

== Election results ==
=== 2017 Election ===
2017 East Lothian Council election

North Berwick Coastal - 3 seats
Party	Candidate	FPv%	Count				
Party	Candidate	FPv%	1	2	3	4	5
Conservative	Jeremy Douglas Findlay	27.16	1,703				
Labour	Jim Goodfellow (incumbent)	23.73	1,488	1,497	1,573		
Conservative	Jane Henderson	21.38	1,341	1,454	1,474	1,475	1,589
SNP	Laura Lowe Forrest	17.97	1,127	1,128	1,233	1,234	1,335
Liberal Democrats	Robert O'Riordan	5.07	318	323	388	389	
Green	Eurig Scandrett	4.67	293	294			
Electorate: 10,752 Valid: 6,270 Spoilt: 114 Quota: 1,568 Turnout: 59.4

=== 2012 Election ===
2012 East Lothian Council election

North Berwick Coastal - 3 seats
Party	Candidate	FPv%	Count			
Party	Candidate	FPv%	1	2	3	4
Conservative	Tim Day	30.65	1,465			
Labour	Jim Goodfellow	27.08	1,294			
SNP	David Stuart Berry (incumbent)†	21.30	1,018	1,043.8	1,059	1,253.9
Liberal Democrats	Stuart Leitch MacKinnon (incumbent)	8.47	405	485.2	510.6	526.3
Independent	Jeremy Douglas Findlay	7.32	350	426.8	444.4	464.9
SNP	Ronnie Gurr	5.17	247	250.1	255.1	
Electorate: 9,811 Valid: 4,779 Spoilt: 42 Quota: 1,195 Turnout: 4,821 (48.71%)

=== 2007 Election ===
2007 East Lothian Council election

North Berwick Coastal
Party	Candidate	FPv%	%	Seat	Count
Conservative	Neil Rankin	1,837	29.7	1	1
SNP	David Berry	1,670	27.0	2	1
Labour	Pat Hanson	980	15.8		
Liberal Democrats	Stuart MacKinnon	747	12.1	3	5
Conservative	Kathryn Smith	565	9.1		
Green	Susan Moffat	393	6.3		
