= Katherine Sangster =

Scottish politician

Katherine Sangster MSP
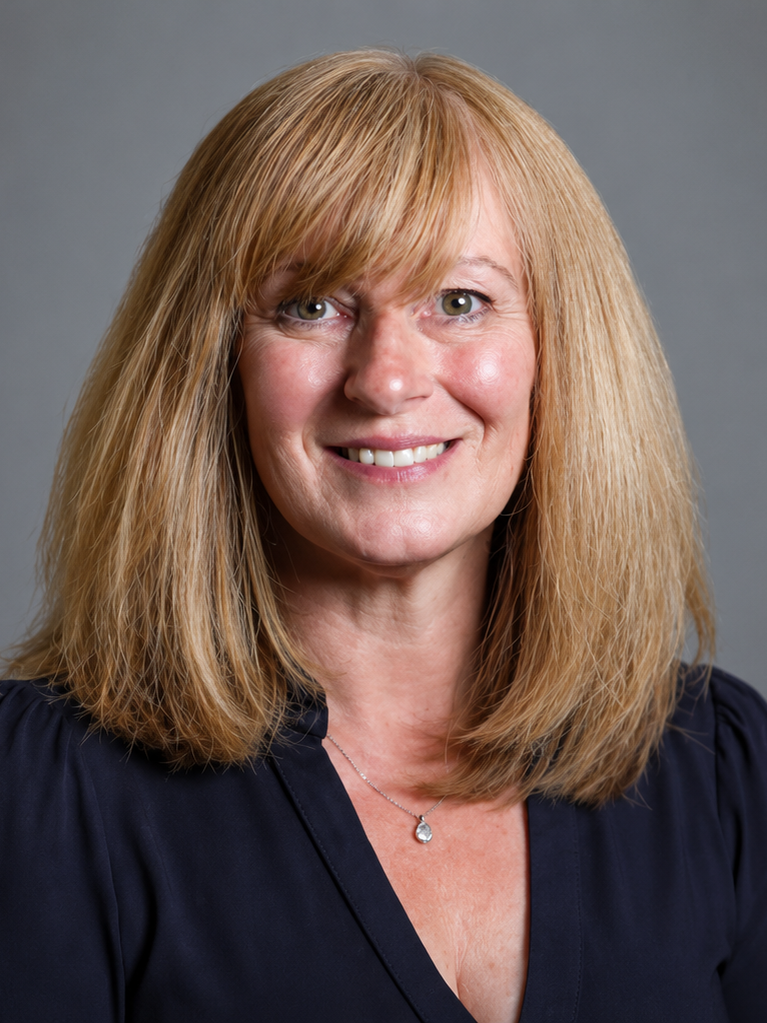
- Official portrait, 2026

Member of the Scottish Parliament for Edinburgh and Lothians East (1 of 7 Regional MSPs)
- Incumbent
- Assumed office 7 May 2026

Personal details
- Party: Scottish Labour

Katherine Sangster is a Scottish politician who was elected to the Scottish Parliament in the 2026 election. She represents Edinburgh and Lothians East as a member of Scottish Labour.

== Biography ==
She stood for the Musselburgh ward in the 2017 East Lothian Council election. She stood for Midlothian South, Tweeddale and Lauderdale in the 2021 Scottish Parliament election

In the 2026 Scottish Parliament election Sangster was elected as a candidate on the regional list for Edinburgh and Lothians East. She stood as the constituency candidate in Edinburgh Eastern, Musselburgh and Tranent, placing second.
