= 2022 East Lothian Council election =

Council election in Scotland

- 6 May 2022

All 22 seats to East Lothian Council 12 seats needed for a majority
	First party	Second party	Third party
	LAB	SNP	CON
Leader	Norman Hampshire	Lyn Jardine	Lachlan Bruce
Party	Labour	SNP	Conservative
Leader's seat	Dunbar and East Linton	Dunbar and East Linton	North Berwick Coastal
Last election	9 seats	6 seats	7 seats
Seats won	9	7	4
Seat change	0	▲1	▼3
First preferences	32.6%	28.24%	21.93%
First preferences (%)	12,426	11,563	8,978
Swing (pp)	▼0.53%	▲0.34%	▼5.47%
	Fourth party	Fifth party
	GRN	IND
Leader	Shona Mcintosh
Party	Green	Independents
Leader's seat	Musselburgh
Last election	0 seats	0 seats
Seats won	1	1
Seat change	▲1	▲1
First preferences	9.94%	3.12%
First preferences (%)	4,069	1,192
Swing (pp)	▲5.45%	▲2.81%

Council Leader before election
Norman Hampshire
Labour
Council Leader after election
Norman Hampshire
Labour

The 2022 East Lothian Council election took place on 5 May 2022 on the same day as the 31 other Scottish local government elections. The election used the 5 wards created under the Local Governance (Scotland) Act 2004, with 18 councillors being elected. Each ward elected either 3 or 4 members, using the STV electoral system.

Scottish Labour retained control of the council, whilst the Scottish Greens won their first ever seat in East Lothian.

== Results ==
2022 East Lothian Council election
Party	Seats	Gains	Losses	Net gain/loss	Seats %	Votes %	Votes	+/−
Labour	9	0	0	Steady	41.0	32.6	12.426	▼0.5
SNP	7	2	1	▲1	32.0	28.2	11,563	▲0.3
Conservative	4	0	3	▼3	18.0	21.9	8,978	▼5.5
Green	1	1	0	▲1	4.5	9.9	4,069	▲5.5
Independent	1	1	0	▲1	4.5	3.1	1,192	▲2.8
Liberal Democrats	0	0	0	Steady	0.0	5.3	2,166	▲0.5
Alba	0	0	0	Steady	0.0	0.7	289	New
Scottish Family	0	0	0	Steady	0.0	0.4	146	New
TUSC	0	0	0	Steady	0.0	0.1	57	Steady
ISP	0	0	0	Steady	0.0	0.1	44	New
UKIP	0	0	0	Steady	0.0	0.1	18	New

Note: Votes are the sum of first preference votes across all council wards. The net gain/loss and percentage changes relate to the result of the previous Scottish local elections on 4 May 2017. This is because STV has an element of proportionality which is not present unless multiple seats are being elected. This may differ from other published sources showing gain/loss relative to seats held at the dissolution of Scotland's councils.

=== Ward summary ===
Results of the 2022 East Lothian Council election by ward
Ward	%	Cllrs	%	Cllrs	%	Cllrs	%	Cllrs	%	Cllrs	%	Cllrs	Total Cllrs
Ward	SNP		Lab		Conservative		Green		Lib Dem		Others		Total Cllrs
Musselburgh	34.33	1	31.04	2	14.73	0	13.47	1	4.24	0	2.21	0	4
Preston, Seton and Gosford	29.78	1	39.67	2	20.46	1	5.78	0	3.29	0	1.02	0	4
Tranent/Wallyford/Macmerry	32.97	2	45.57	2	13.44	0	4.09	0	2.12	0	1.80	0	4
North Berwick Coastal	19.86	1	21.12	1	38.97	1	13.16	0	6.21	0	0.69	0	3
Haddington and Lammermuir	26.19	1	36.44	2	21.89	1	7.37	0	5.52	0	2.59	0	4
Dunbar and East Linton	26.78	1	25.25	1	21.45	1	15.13	0	10.13	0	1.26	0	3

== Ward results ==
=== Musselburgh ===
Musselburgh − 4 seats
Party	Candidate	FPv%	Count							
Party	Candidate	FPv%	1	2	3	4	5	6	7	8
SNP	Cher Cassini	21.70	1,596							
Labour	Andrew Forrest (incumbent)	16.44	1,209	1,214	1,222	1,231	1,287	1,425	1,472	
Conservative	Katie Mackie (incumbent)	14.71	1,082	1,082	1,100	1,106	1,161	1,172	1,177	1,177
Labour	Ruaridh Bennett	14.60	1,074	1,078	1,081	1,091	1,160	1,234	1,276	1,276
Green	Shona Mcintosh	13.47	991	1,001	1,017	1,035	1,100	1,666		
SNP	Iain Whyte	12.63	929	1,022	1,026	1,056	1,075			
Liberal Democrats	Susan Butts	4.24	312	313	322	325				
Alba	Michelle Graham	1.14	84	85	92					
Scottish Family	Stephen Carter	1.07	79	79						
Electorate: 16,636 Valid: 7,356 Spoilt: 126 Quota: 1,472 Turnout: 45.0%

=== Preston Seton and Gosford ===
Preston, Seton and Gosford − 4 seats
Party	Candidate	FPv%	Count						
Party	Candidate	FPv%	1	2	3	4	5	6	7
Labour	Colin Yorkston (incumbent)	24.4	1,569						
Conservative	Lachlan Bruce (incumbent)	20.5	1,314						
SNP	Neil Gilbert (incumbent)	18.0	1,156	1,160.34	1,160.74	1,185.74	1,199.92	1,203.16	1,313.89
Labour	Brooke Ritchie	15.2	978	1,220	1,227	1,232	1,328		
SNP	Janis Wilson	11.8	756	763	763	774	787	791	914
Green	Tim Porteus	5.8	374	376	376	383	432	439	
Liberal Democrats	Ben Morse	3.3	211	215	222	229			
Alba	Paul Brown	1.0	66	66	66				
Electorate: 15,109 Valid: 6,421 Spoilt: 136 Quota: 1,285 Turnout: 43.4%

=== Tranent, Wallyford and Macmerry ===
Tranent, Wallyford and Macmerry − 4 seats
Party	Candidate	FPv%	Count								
Party	Candidate	FPv%	1	2	3	4	5	6	7	8	9
Labour	Fiona Dugdale (incumbent)	24.0	1,437								
SNP	Kenny McLeod (incumbent)	21.8	1,307								
Labour	Colin McGinn (incumbent)	21.6	1,290								
SNP	Lee-Anne Menzies	11.1	666	689	782	791	816	827	837	1,000	1,077
Green	Marnie Stirling	4.1	245	266	269	275	279	297	333		
Liberal Democrats	Elizabeth Wilson	2.1	127	159	159	167	167	177			
TUSC	Jimmy Haddow	1.0	57	73	73	80	89				
Alba	Hazel Hamilton	0.9	51	54	55	57					
Electorate: 15,497 Valid: 5,984 Spoilt: 148 Quota: 1,197 Turnout: 39.6%

=== North Berwick Coastal ===
North Berwick Coastal − 3 seats
Party	Candidate	FPv%	Count							
Party	Candidate	FPv%	1	2	3	4	5	6	7	8
Labour	Carol McFarlane	21.1	1,447	1,449	1,552	1,620	1,971			
Conservative	Jeremy Findlay (incumbent)	20.3	1,389	1,391	1,395	1,431	1,468	1,510.93	1,521.78	2,714.1
SNP	Liz Allan	19.9	1,360	1,361	1,363	1,383	1,815			
Conservative	Judy Lockhart-Hunter	18.7	1,280	1,282	1,288	1,338	1,373	1,410.30	1,418	
Green	Jacq Cottrell	13.2	901	903	910	1,006				
Liberal Democrats	Stuart Smith	6.2	425	425	429					
Scottish Family	Alison Carter	0.4	29	33						
UKIP	George Cowen	0.3	18							
Electorate: 12,181 Valid: 6,849 Spoilt: 78 Quota: 1,713 Turnout: 6,927 (56.9%)

=== Haddington and Lammermuir ===
Haddington and Lammermuir − 4 seats
Party	Candidate	FPv%	Count								
Party	Candidate	FPv%	1	2	3	4	5	6	7	8	9
Conservative	George McGuire	21.89	1,714								
Labour	Shamin Akhtar (incumbent)	20.75	1,625								
Labour	John McMillan (incumbent)	15.68	1,228	1,271.22	1,310.66	1,319.85	1,344.62	1,542.60	1,714.0		
SNP	Tom Trotter (incumbent)	14.14	1,107	1,109.06	1,110.52	1,124.35	1,131.73	1,148.86	1,351.07	1,378.05	2,350.54
SNP	Graeme MacGregor	12.06	944	945.72	949.63	970.46	982.49	1,003.38	1,154.26	1,168.20	
Green	Jackie Swailes	7.37	577	580.94	584.37	591.49	609.29	725.00			
Liberal Democrats	Stuart Crawford	5.52	432	469.91	474.47	478.73	533.41				
Independent	David Barrett	0.37	29	132.65	134.27	148.44					
Alba	Morgwn Davies	1.09	85	85.66	85.86						
Electorate: 16,204 Valid: 7,830 Spoilt: 121 Quota: 1,567 Turnout: 7,951 (49.1%)

=== Dunbar and East Linton ===
Dunbar and East Linton − 3 seats
Party	Candidate	FPv%	Count					
Party	Candidate	FPv%	1	2	3	4	5	6
SNP	Lyn Jardine	26.84	1,742					
Labour	Norman Hampshire (incumbent)	25.32	1,643					
Conservative	Donna Collins	21.49	1,395	1,397.97	1,401.07	1,411.10	1,414.12	1,638.47
Green	Mark James	15.16	984	1,049.02	1,051.99	1,061.52	1,091.10	1,359.02
Liberal Democrats	Jacquie Bell	10.15	659	673.32	678.20	687.86	698.45	
Scottish Family	Timothy Anderson	0.59	38	40.04	40.45			
ISP	Cris Thacker	0.45	29	40.05	56.34	56.56		
Electorate: 16,204 Valid: 6,490 Spoilt: 121 Quota: 1,627 Turnout: 6,505 (40.1%)

== See also ==
- East Lothian Council elections
