= Preston, Seton and Gosford (ward) =

Electoral ward of East Lothian, Scotland

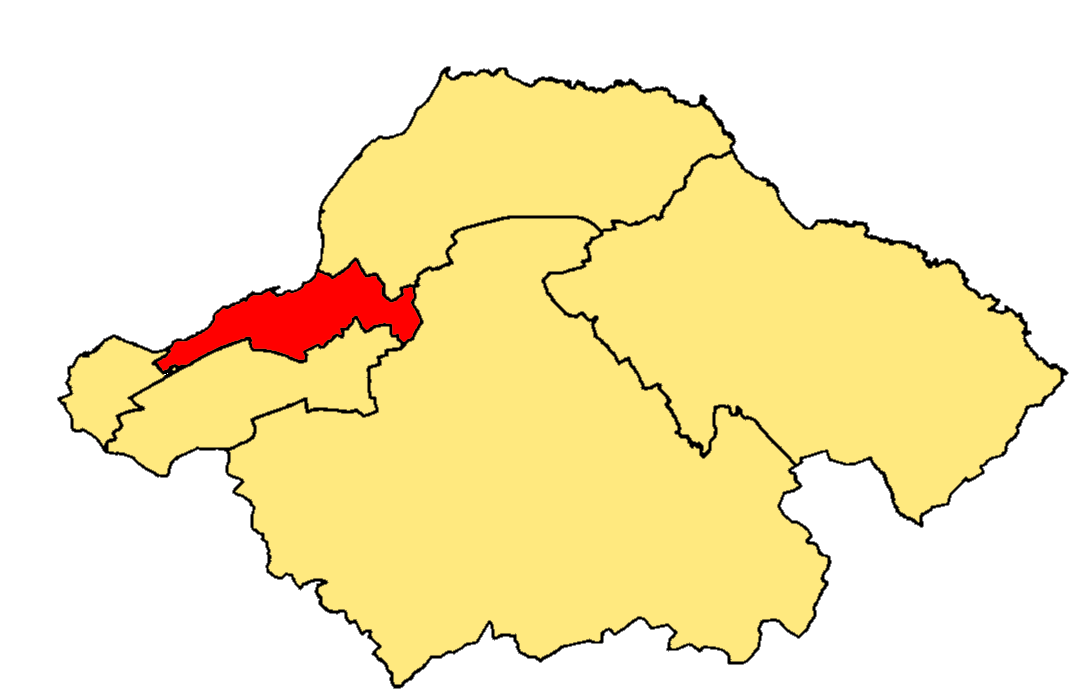
Location of the ward

Preston, Seton and Gosford is one of the six wards used to elect members of the East Lothian Council. It elects three Councillors.

== Councillors ==
Election	Councillors			
2007	Peter MacKenzie (SNP)	Willie Innes (Labour)	Margaret Libberton (Labour)	Stuart Currie (Liberal Democrats)
2012	Peter MacKenzie (SNP)	Willie Innes (Labour)	Margaret Libberton (Labour)	Steven Brown (SNP)
2017	Neil Gilbert (SNP)	Willie Innes (Labour)	Fiona O'Donnell (Labour)	Lachlan Bruce (Conservative)
2022	Neil Gilbert (SNP)	Colin Yorkson (Labour)	Brooke Ritchie (Labour)	Lachlan Bruce (Conservative)

== Election results ==
=== 2017 Election ===
2017 East Lothian Council election

Preston, Seton and Gosford - 4 seats
Party	Candidate	FPv%	Count							
Party	Candidate	FPv%	1	2	3	4	5	6	7	8
Labour	Willie Innes (Incumbent)	24.3	1,801							
Conservative	Lachlan Bruce	24.1	1,784							
SNP	Neil Gilbert	16.2	1,197	1,208	1,215	1,260	1,288	1,294	1,322	2,201
Labour	Fiona O'Donnell	12.6	932	1,164	1,226	1,261	1,369	1,818		
SNP	Janis Wilson	11.4	844	852	854	922	936	951	975	
Labour	Brian Weddell	5.8	429	471	485	501	520			
Green	Lesley Orr	3.11	230	234	250					
Liberal Democrats	Ghill Donald	2.4	180	184	260	300				
Electorate: 14,702 Valid: 7,397 Spoilt: 178 Quota: 1,480 Turnout: 51.5%

=== 2012 Election ===
2012 East Lothian Council election

Preston/Seton/Gosford - 4 seats
Party	Candidate	FPv%	Count						
Party	Candidate	FPv%	1	2	3	4	5	6	7
Labour	Willie Innes (incumbent)	38.76	2,312						
SNP	Steven Brown	18.51	1,104	1,149.5	1,204.8				
Labour	Margaret Libberton (incumbent)	15.46	922	1,871.2					
SNP	Peter Robert MacKenzie (incumbent)	13.89	829	850.8	900.9	910.1	926.9	997.7	1,166.5
Conservative	Lachlan Bruce	8.38	500	512.1	555.2	555.4	587.4	697	
Liberal Democrats	Hugh Reid	3.6	215	223.2	266.6	266.8	280.1		
UKIP	Gordon Norrie	1.39	83	89.3	113.9	114.1			
Electorate: 13,386 Valid: 5,965 Spoilt: 34 Quota: 1,194 Turnout: 6,088 (44.56%)

=== 2007 Election ===
2007 East Lothian Council election

Preston/Seton/Gosford
Party	Candidate	FPv%	%	Seat	Count
Labour	Willie Innes	2,205	30.5	1	1
SNP	Peter MacKenzie	1,906	26.4	2	1
Conservative	Michael Veitch	1,040	14.4		
Labour	Margaret Libberton	927	12.8	3	3
Liberal Democrats	Stuart Currie†	909	12.6	4	5
Independent	Andy Spence	244	3.4		
