= Paul McLennan =

Scottish Housing Minister

Paul McLennan MSP
- Official portrait, 2026

Minister for Housing
- In office 29 March 2023 – 11 June 2025
- First Minister: Humza Yousaf; John Swinney
- Preceded by: Margaret Burgess
- Succeeded by: Màiri McAllan (as Cabinet Secretary)

Member of the Scottish Parliament for East Lothian Coast and Lammermuirs East Lothian (2021–2026)
- Incumbent
- Assumed office 6 May 2021
- Preceded by: Iain Gray
- Majority: 418 (1.1%)

Member of East Lothian Council for Dunbar and East Linton
- In office 3 May 2007 – 5 May 2022

Personal details
- Born: December 1966 (age 59) Dunbar, East Lothian, Scotland
- Party: Scottish National Party
- Spouse: Sharron McLennan
- Children: 2

Paul Stewart McLennan is a Scottish politician who served as Minister for Housing from 2023 to 2025. A member of the Scottish National Party (SNP), he has been the Member of the Scottish Parliament (MSP) for East Lothian Coast and Lammermuirs, previously East Lothian, since 2021.

== Personal life ==
McLennan is married to his wife Sharron, with whom he has two children, Scott and Kirsty. He is a lifelong resident of Dunbar.

== Political career ==
McLennan joined the SNP at approximately 25 years old.

He served as a local councillor for the Dunbar and East Linton multi-member ward of East Lothian Council from 2007 until 2022 having previously been an unsuccessful candidate in earlier elections to single-member wards, and was both the SNP group leader and the council leader from 2007-12. He has been a board member of NHS Lothian, the regional offices of Scottish Enterprise and the Commission on School Reform.

McLennan is East Lothian's first SNP MSP, with the constituency having been previously held exclusively by Scottish Labour for 22 years.

In June 2025, McLennan resigned as Housing Minister. In his resignation letter he said that following a "a recent, though thankfully short, period of ill health" he believed that he should stand down. He had been appointed to the position by Humza Yousaf in 2023.

In the 2026 Scottish Parliament election, McLennan stood for re-election in the redrawn East Lothian Coast and Lammermuirs constituency within the new Edinburgh and Lothians East electoral region. Despite a national swing against his party, he retained the seat with a reduced vote share of 32.7% and a narrowed majority of 418 votes.

Scottish Parliament
Preceded by Iain Gray	MSP for East Lothian; 2021 – present	Incumbent
