= Tranent/Wallyford/Macmerry (ward) =

Electoral ward in East Lothian, Scotland

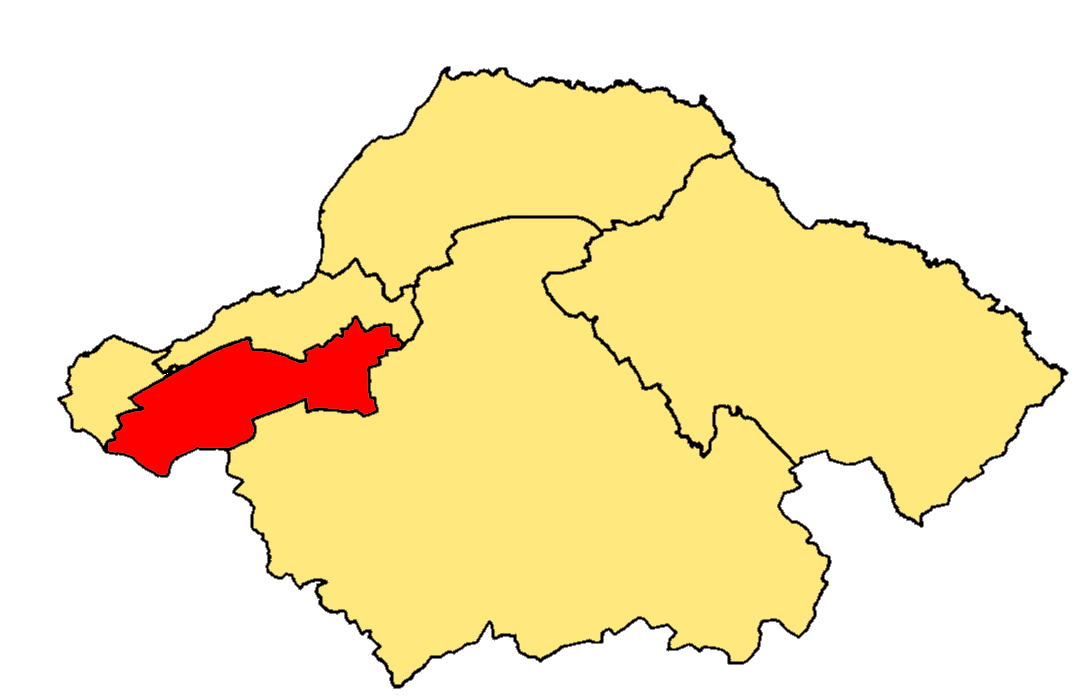
Location of the ward

Tranent/Wallyford/Macmerry is one of the six wards used to elect members of the East Lothian Council. It elects three Councillors.

== Councillors ==
Election	Councillors			
2017	Colin McGinn (Labour)	Fiona Dugdale (Labour)	Kenny McLeod (SNP)	Gordon Mackett (Conservative)
2022	Colin McGinn (Labour)	Fiona Dugdale (Labour)	Kenny McLeod (SNP)	Lee-Anne Menzies (SNP)

== Election results ==
=== 2017 Election ===
2017 East Lothian Council election

Tranent/Wallyford/Macmerry - 4 seats
Party	Candidate	FPv%	Count						
Party	Candidate	FPv%	1	2	3	4	5	6	7
SNP	Kenny McLeod (incumbent)	24.5	1,540						
Labour	Fiona Dugdale	20.3	1,272						
Labour	Colin McGinn	15.3	958	969	972	978	1,000	1,102	1,893
Conservative	Gordon Mackett	15.7	986	987	988	994	1,054	1,089	1,142
Labour	Jim Gillies (incumbent)	13.3	837	844	854	864	897	1,014	
SNP	Linda Watson	7.4	464	713	713	725	746		
Liberal Democrats	Alexander Graham	2.5	159	162	162	176			
TUSC	Jimmy Haddow	1.0	63						
Electorate: 14,699 Valid: 6,279 Spoilt: 127 Quota: 1,256 Turnout: 43.6%
