= 2017 East Lothian Council election =

2017 Scottish local government election

- 4 May 2017

All 22 seats to East Lothian Council 12 seats needed for a majority
	First party	Second party	Third party
	Lab	Con	SNP
Leader	Willie Innes	Jane Henderson	Stuart Currie
Party	Labour	Conservative	SNP
Leader's seat	Preston, Seton and Gosford	North Berwick Coastal	Musselburgh
Last election	10 seats, 43.1%	3 seats, 14.4%	9 seats, 30.4%
Seats before	10	3	9
Seats after	9	7	6
Seat change	▼1	▲4	▼3

Council Leader before election
Willie Innes
Labour
Council Leader after election
Willie Innes
Labour

2017 Elections to East Lothian Council were held on 4 May 2017 on the same day as the other Scottish local government elections. The election consisted of 6 wards electing three or four councillors using the single transferable vote system form of proportional representation, with 22 councillors elected.

This election featured revised ward boundaries to three wards resulting in the reduction of the number of East Lothian councillors from 23 to 22. Two former Musselburgh wards were merged, while losing Wallyford and Whitecraig with 4 councillors being elected. The bulk of the previous Fa'side ward became Tranent/Wallyford/Macmerry. Haddington and Lammermuir ward expanded with the addition of Ormiston and Pencaitland and gained a councillor.

Following the elections, Labour announced that they would form a minority administration. This replaced the previous coalition between Labour, the Conservatives and the one Independent councillor.

== Election result ==
2017 East Lothian Council election
Party	Seats	Gains	Losses	Net gain/loss	Seats %	Votes %	Votes	+/−
Labour	9	1	2	-1	40.9	33.1	13,723	-10.0
Conservative	7	4	0	+4	31.82	27.4	11,382	+13.0
SNP	6	0	3	-3	27.27	27.9	11,584	-2.5
Liberal Democrats	0	0	0	-	-	4.75	1,971	-0.85
Green	0	-	-	-	-	4.49	1,862	New
Independent	0	0	1	-1	0.0	2.17	900	-3.73
TUSC	0	-	-	-	-	0.15	63	-0.15

Note: "Votes" are the first preference votes. The net gain/loss and percentage changes relate to the result of the previous Scottish local elections on 3 May 2012. This may differ from other published sources showing gain/loss relative to seats held at dissolution of Scotland's councils.

== Ward results ==
=== Musselburgh ===
- 2012:
  - Musselburgh West (2xSNP; 1xLab)
  - Musselburgh East and Carberry (1xIndependent; 1xSNP; 1xLab)
- 2017: 2xSNP 1xConservative 1xLab
- 2012-2017 Change: 2 wards combined due to ward change resulting in one less councillor for Musselburgh. Conservative gain one seat.

Musselburgh - 4 seats
Party	Candidate	FPv%	Count								
Party	Candidate	FPv%	1	2	3	4	5	6	7	8	9
SNP	Stuart Currie (incumbent)	22.12	1,683								
Conservative	Katie Mackie	19.34	1,472	1,473	1,478	1,570					
Labour	Andy Forrest (incumbent)	15.48	1,178	1,187	1,192	1,266	1,274	1,362	1,924		
SNP	John Williamson (incumbent)	11.04	840	960	967	1,007	1,008	1,241	1,278	1,322	1,583
Independent	John Caldwell (incumbent)	10.56	804	809	843	896	907	985	1,015	1,107	
Labour	Katherine Sangster	7.47	568	570	579	637	644	742			
Green	Jason Rose	6.53	497	506	520	630	633				
Liberal Democrats	Clare Graham	6.17	470	473	487						
Independent	Theresa Sives	1.26	96	96							
Electorate: 15,874 Valid: 7,608 Spoilt: 139 Quota: 1,522 Turnout: 48.8%

=== Preston, Seton and Gosford ===
- 2012: 2xLabour 2xSNP
- 2017: 2xLabour 1xSNP 1xCON
- 2012-2017 Change: Conservative gain one seat from SNP

Preston, Seton and Gosford - 4 seats
Party	Candidate	FPv%	Count							
Party	Candidate	FPv%	1	2	3	4	5	6	7	8
Labour	Willie Innes (Incumbent) ††	24.3	1,801							
Conservative	Lachlan Bruce	24.1	1,784							
SNP	Neil Gilbert	16.2	1,197	1,208	1,215	1,260	1,288	1,294	1,322	2,201
Labour	Fiona O'Donnell	12.6	932	1,164	1,226	1,261	1,369	1,818		
SNP	Janis Wilson	11.4	844	852	854	922	936	951	975	
Labour	Brian Weddell	5.8	429	471	485	501	520			
Green	Lesley Orr	3.11	230	234	250					
Liberal Democrats	Ghill Donald	2.4	180	184	260	300				
Electorate: 14,702 Valid: 7,397 Spoilt: 178 Quota: 1,480 Turnout: 51.5%

=== Tranent/Wallyford/Macmerry ===
- 2012: 3xLabour 1xSNP (as Fa'side ward)
- 2017: 2xLabour 1xSNP

Tranent/Wallyford/Macmerry - 3 seats
Party	Candidate	FPv%	Count						
Party	Candidate	FPv%	1	2	3	4	5	6	7
SNP	Kenny McLeod (incumbent)	24.5	1,540						
Labour	Fiona Dugdale	20.3	1,272						
Labour	Colin McGinn	15.3	958	969	972	978	1,000	1,102	1,893
Labour	Jim Gillies (incumbent)	13.3	837	844	854	864	897	1,014	
SNP	Linda Watson	7.4	464	713	713	725	746		
Liberal Democrats	Alexander Graham	2.5	159	162	162	176			
TUSC	Jimmy Haddow	1.0	63						
Electorate: 14,699 Valid: 6,279 Spoilt: 127 Quota: 1,256 Turnout: 43.6%

=== North Berwick Coastal ===
- 2012: 1xLabour 1xConservative 1xSNP
- 2017: 2xCon 1xLabour
- 2012-2017 Change: Conservatives gain one seat from SNP

North Berwick Coastal - 3 seats
Party	Candidate	FPv%	Count				
Party	Candidate	FPv%	1	2	3	4	5
Conservative	Jeremy Douglas Findlay	27.16	1,703				
Labour	Jim Goodfellow (incumbent)	23.73	1,488	1,497	1,573		
Conservative	Jane Henderson	21.38	1,341	1,454	1,474	1,475	1,589
SNP	Laura Lowe Forrest	17.97	1,127	1,128	1,233	1,234	1,335
Liberal Democrats	Robert O'Riordan	5.07	318	323	388	389	
Green	Eurig Scandrett	4.67	293	294			
Electorate: 10,752 Valid: 6,270 Spoilt: 114 Quota: 1,568 Turnout: 59.4%

=== Haddington and Lammermuir ===
- 2012: 1xConservative 1xLabour 1xSNP
- 2017: 1xConservative 2xLabour 1xSNP
- 2012-2017 Change: No change

Haddington and Lammermuir - 4 seats
Party	Candidate	FPv%	Count						
Party	Candidate	FPv%	1	2	3	4	5	6	7
Conservative	Brian Small†	29.03	2,262						
Labour	John McMillan (incumbent)	18.71	1,458	1,593					
Labour	Shamin Akhtar (incumbent)	15.00	1,169	1,234	1,256	1,316	1,627		
SNP	Tom Trotter (incumbent)	14.66	1,142	1,153	1,155	1,236	1,327	1,333	2,227
SNP	Ruth Currie	11.41	889	894	895	947	1,007	1,017	
Liberal Democrats	Kelvin Pate	7.29	568	791	795	889			
Green	Cris Thacker	3.88	302	329	330				
Electorate: 14,095 Valid: 7,790 Spoilt: 108 Quota: 1,559 Turnout: 56.0%

=== Dunbar and East Linton ===
- 2012: 1xLabour 1xConservative 1xSNP
- 2017: 1xLabour 1xConservative 1xSNP
- 2012-2017 Change: No change

Dunbar and East Linton - 3 seats
Party	Candidate	FPv%	Count					
Party	Candidate	FPv%	1	2	3	4	5	6
Conservative	Sue Kempson	29.86	1,834					
Labour	Norman Hampshire (incumbent)	26.59	1,633					
SNP	Paul McLennan (incumbent)	17.04	1,047	1,054	1,064	1,094	1,199	2,216
SNP	Isobel Knox	13.2	811	819	828	852	1,177	
Green	Sarah Beattie-Smith	8.79	540	569	584	761		
Liberal Democrats	Elisabeth Wilson	4.49	276	392	421			
Electorate: 10,995 Valid: 6,141 Spoilt: 43 Quota: 1,536 Turnout: 56.4%

== Retiring councillors ==
Council ward	Departing councillor	Party
Dunbar and East Linton	Michael Veitch	Conservative
Fa'side	Donald Grant	Labour
Haddington and Lammermuir	Ludovic Broun-Lindsay	Conservative
Musselburgh	John McNeil	Labour
Musselburgh	Fraser McAllister	Scottish National Party
North Berwick Coastal	David Berry	Independent
North Berwick Coastal	Tim Day	Conservative
Preston/Seton/Gosford	Margaret Libberton	Labour
Preston/Seton/Gosford	Steven Brown	Scottish National Party
Preston/Seton/Gosford	Peter Robert MacKenzie	Scottish National Party

== Changes since 2017 ==
- † On 26 February 2019, Haddington and Lammermuir Councillor Brian Small resigned his seat. A by-election followed was held on 9 May 2019. The seat was won by Craig Hoy of the Conservative Party.
- †† On 24 October 2021, Preston, Seton and Gosford Councillor and Leader of East Lothian Council, Willie Innes, died after a long illness.

== By-elections since 2017 ==
Haddington and Lammermuir by-election 9 May 2019
Party	Candidate	FPv%	Count				
Party	Candidate	FPv%	1	2	3	4	5
Conservative	Craig Hoy	35.01	2,212	2,249	2,428	2,759	3,277
SNP	Lorraine Glass	29.53	1,866	1,874	2,044	2,469	
Labour	Neal Black	21.51	1,359	1,370	1,589		
Liberal Democrats	Stuart Crawford	12.25	774	782			
UKIP	David Sisson	1.71	108				
Electorate: 14,396 Valid: 6,319 Spoilt: 44 Quota: 3,160 Turnout: 44.2%

Preston, Seton and Gosford by-election 20 January 2022
Party	Candidate	FPv%	Count					
Party	Candidate	FPv%	1	2	3	4	5	6
Labour	Colin Yorkston	38.53	1,793	1,815	1,861	1,927	2,390	
SNP	Janis Wilson	26.16	1,217	1,242	1,258	1,391	1,458	
Conservative	Andy Ovens	24.80	1,154	1,173	1,204	1,212		
Green	Tim Porteus	4.96	231	241	266			
Liberal Democrats	Ben Morse	2.92	136	154				
Independent	Calum Miller	2.62	122					
Electorate: 14,952 Valid: 4,696 Spoilt: 43 Quota: 2,327 Turnout: 31.4%

== See also ==
- East Lothian Council elections
