= 2012 East Lothian Council election =

2012 Scottish local government election

- 3 May 2012

All 23 seats to East Lothian Council 12 seats needed for a majority
	First party	Second party	Third party
Leader	Willie Innes	Paul Stewart McLennan	Ludovic Broun-Lindsay
Party	Labour	SNP	Conservative
Leader's seat	Preston/Seton/Gosford	Dunbar and East Linton	Haddington and Lammermuir
Last election	7 seats, 30.4%	7 seats, 30.4%	2 seats, 8.7%
Seats before	7	9	2
Seats won	10	9	3
Seat change	▲3	▲2	▲1
	Fourth party	Fifth party
Leader	John Murray Caldwell	Stuart MacKinnon
Party	Independent	Liberal Democrats
Leader's seat	Musselburgh East and Carberry	North Berwick Coastal
Last election	1 seats, 4.3%	6 seats, 26.1%
Seats before	1	4
Seats won	1	0
Seat change	0	▼6
- The multi-member wards
Council Leader before election
Paul Stewart McLennan
SNP
Council Leader after election
Willie Innes
Labour

2012 Elections to East Lothian Council were held on 3 May 2012, on the same day as the other Scottish local government elections. The election used the 7 wards created as a result of the Local Governance (Scotland) Act 2004, with each ward electing three or four councillors using the single transferable vote system form of proportional representation, with 23 councillors elected.

The election saw Labour strengthen their position on the council, regaining 3 of the seats they had lost in the 2007 Local Elections while also significantly increasing their vote share. The Scottish National Party also increased their representation with 2 net gains. The Scottish Conservative and Unionist Party increased their representation to 3 seats while Independents retained their single seat on the authority. The Scottish Liberal Democrats were decimated, losing all their six seats although two members had defected after 2007 and one of these councillors was re-elected as a Scottish Nationalist, the other failed to be re-elected as a Scottish Nationalist.

Following the election the Labour Party formed a coalition with the Conservatives and the one Independent councillor, with Councillor Willie Innes of the Labour Party becoming leader of the council and experienced Conservative Councillor Ludovic Broun-Lindsay becoming provost, resigning as leader of the Conservatives on the council to hold the provost role in a non-partisan and non-party political way, with new councillor Michael Veitch becoming leader of the Conservative group. This new coalition replaced the previous SNP - Lib Dem coalition administration, which had existed from 2007 to 2012.

== Background ==
The previous elections in 2007 had returned no one party with enough councillors to create majority single-party governance as there had been in East Lothian up until that point. The SNP and Labour both returned 7 councillors to the chamber, the Liberal Democrats won 6, the Conservatives 2 and a sole independent candidate was elected as councillor. After the election, the SNP and the Liberal Democrats entered into a coalition, throwing Labour out of office, having previously controlled the council with a large majority for many years before that.

The 2012 election was the first since Councillor David Berry had fallen only 151 votes short of winning East Lothian for the SNP in the 2011 Scottish Parliament Elections a major coup due to the seat being considered a traditional Labour stronghold seat and it being the seat of then leader of Scottish Labour, Iain Gray. While nationally at that election the SNP was the first party to gain an overall majority in the Scottish Parliament. With this result still fresh in the mind, the SNP predicted major gains, including taking overall majority control of many councils including East Lothian.

The Labour Party, in many aspects still reeling from national electoral annihilation on a national level during the previous year's election, had come into the election with the hope of gaining seats, with a slim hope gaining a majority control of the council.

The Liberal Democrats had struggled during the previous five years of leadership on the council with the SNP. They had suffered the defection of wife-and-husband councillor duo of Ruth and Stuart Currie on 11 August 2009 to their coalition partners, the SNP, due to "personal disagreements" with fellow Liberal Democrat councillors. This reduced their representation on the council from 6 to 4, weakening their hand in the rule coalition. It also had the effect of damaging the morale and effectiveness of the local party. This was also the Scottish Liberal Democrats' second election since the entering coalition with the Conservative Party in the UK Parliament. The party had suffered badly at the 2011 Scottish Parliament Election, and it was expected that this would continue in the 2012 local elections.

For the Scottish Conservatives, it was the first election since the election of Ruth Davidson as leader of the party in Scotland. On a local level the Conservatives entered the election in East Lothian with a realistic hope of a gain in the election through Michael Veitch, who was the Conservative candidate in the 2010 general election in East Lothian, in the Dunbar and East Linton ward. Previously the Conservatives had come second in the 2010 General Election, a very good result. The party locally believed that it would be able to hold the balance of power in the new makeup of the council with the option of working with either the Labour Party or the SNP on a local level.

Independent John Caldwell had first been elected in 2007, and the local media felt that he would keep his seat during this election. There was little chance of this changing due to him being considered an effective local politician by the majority of the public. He was joined by 3 other independent candidates who were standing in other wards, none of whom, it was felt, who stood a realistic chance of being elected.

Two minor parties also took part in the election, UKIP and Trade Unionist and Socialist Coalition, each standing 2 and 1 candidates respectively. This was the first time that both of these parties were standing candidates in the East Lothian Council elections since the introduction of the current voting system.

Since the election in 2012 Councillor David Berry has left the SNP and now sits as an Independent Nationalist councillor.

In April 2013 Councillor Stuart Currie replaced Councillor Paul McLennan as SNP Group Leader and Leader of the Opposition.

== Election result ==
East Lothian local election result 2012
Party	Seats	Gains	Losses	Net gain/loss	Seats %	Votes %	Votes	+/−
Labour	10	3	0	+3	43.48	43.1	14,183	+10.5
SNP	9	2	0	+2	39.13	30.4	10,001	+3.5
Conservative	3	1	0	+1	13.04	14.4	4,724	-3.0
Independent	1	-	-	-	4.35	5.9	1,925	+0.23
Liberal Democrats	0	0	6	-6	-	5.6	1,835	-10.13
UKIP	0	-	-	-	-	0.47	156	+0.45
TUSC	0	-	-	-	-	0.3	105	New

Note: "Votes" are the first preference votes. The net gain/loss and percentage changes relate to the result of the previous Scottish local elections on 3 May 2007. This may differ from other published sources showing gain/loss relative to seats held at dissolution of Scotland's councils.

== Ward results ==
=== Musselburgh West ===
- 2007: 1xSNP; 1xLab; 1xLib Dem
- 2012: 2xSNP; 1xLab
- 2007-2012 Change: SNP gain one seat from Lib Dem

Musselburgh West - 3 seats
Party	Candidate	FPv%	Count					
Party	Candidate	FPv%	1	2	3	4	5	6
Labour	Johnnie McNeil (incumbent)	41.93	1,427					
SNP	Fraser McAllister	20.33	692	746.9	766.5	780.9	822.6	910.5
SNP	John Charles Williamson (incumbent)	13.87	472	526.1	542.5	551.7	581.6	671.2
Liberal Democrats	Barry John Turner (incumbent)	8.35	284	363.1	382.1	452.6	563.2	
Conservative	Katie Mackie	6.38	217	243.6	246.9			
Independent	Robert Fairnie	6.05	206	279.5	323.1	393.3		
TUSC	Jack Fraser	3.09	105	163.5				
Electorate: 8,728 Valid: 3,403 Spoilt: 45 Quota: 851 Turnout: 3,448 (38.99%)

=== Musselburgh East and Carberry ===
- 2007: 1xSNP; 1xLab; 1xIndependent
- 2012: 1xIndependent; 1xSNP; 1xLab
- 2007-2012 Change: No change

Musselburgh East and Carberry - 3 seats
Party	Candidate	FPv%	Count				
Party	Candidate	FPv%	1	2	3	4	5
Independent	John Murray Caldwell (incumbent)	26.72	1,052				
SNP	Stuart McDonald Currie *	26.31	1,036				
Labour	Andy Forrest (incumbent)	22.63	891	906.7	916.9	952.4	1,664.7
Labour	Judith Dunn	18.24	718	734.3	747.8	811.3	
Conservative	Fred Lawson	6.10	240	251.3	255.9		
Electorate: 9,569 Valid: 3,937 Spoilt: 34 Quota: 985 Turnout: 3,996 (41.14%)

- = Outgoing Councillor from a different Ward.

=== Preston/Seton/Gosford ===
- 2007: 2xLab; 1xSNP; 1xLib Dem
- 2012: 2xLab; 2xSNP
- 2007-2012 Change: SNP gain one seat from Lib Dem

Preston/Seton/Gosford - 4 seats
Party	Candidate	FPv%	Count						
Party	Candidate	FPv%	1	2	3	4	5	6	7
Labour	Willie Innes (incumbent)	38.76	2,312						
SNP	Steven Brown	18.51	1,104	1,149.5	1,204.8				
Labour	Margaret Libberton (incumbent)	15.46	922	1,871.2					
SNP	Peter Robert MacKenzie (incumbent)	13.89	829	850.8	900.9	910.1	926.9	997.7	1,166.5
Conservative	Lachlan Bruce	8.38	500	512.1	555.2	555.4	587.4	697	
Liberal Democrats	Hugh Reid	3.6	215	223.2	266.6	266.8	280.1		
UKIP	Gordon Norrie	1.39	83	89.3	113.9	114.1			
Electorate: 13,386 Valid: 5,965 Spoilt: 34 Quota: 1,194 Turnout: 6,088 (44.56%)

=== Fa'side ===
- 2007: 2xLab; 1xSNP; 1xLib Dem
- 2012: 3xLab; 1xSNP
- 2007-2012 Change: Lab gain one seat from Lib Dem

Fa'side - 4 seats
Party	Candidate	FPv%	Count						
Party	Candidate	FPv%	1	2	3	4	5	6	7
Labour	Jim Gillies (incumbent)	27.4	1,539						
Labour	Donald Grant (incumbent)	23.2	1,308						
SNP	Kenny McLeod (incumbent)	16.2	907	935.1	955.2	983.8	1,035.4	1,038.7	1,686.1
SNP	Ruth Catherine Linn Currie (incumbent)	11.6	663	676.2	680.3	700.6	742.9	747.7	
Labour	Shamin Akhtar	11.0	615	928.5	1,065.7	1,110.2	1,174.4		
Conservative	Robert McNab Cowe	7.2	411	419.4	423.1	468.6			
Liberal Democrats	Darren Maley	3.0	170	178.1	181.2				
Electorate: 13,390 Valid: 5,613 Spoilt: 105 Quota: 1,123 Turnout: 5,718 (41.92%)

=== North Berwick Coastal ===
- 2007: 1xCon; 1xSNP; 1xLib Dem
- 2012: 1xCon; 1xLab; 1xSNP
- 2007-2012 Change: Lab gain one seat from Lib Dem

North Berwick Coastal - 3 seats
Party	Candidate	FPv%	Count			
Party	Candidate	FPv%	1	2	3	4
Conservative	Tim Day	30.65	1,465			
Labour	Jim Goodfellow	27.08	1,294			
SNP	David Stuart Berry (incumbent)†	21.30	1,018	1,043.8	1,059	1,253.9
Liberal Democrats	Stuart Leitch MacKinnon (incumbent)	8.47	405	485.2	510.6	526.3
Independent	Jeremy Douglas Findlay	7.32	350	426.8	444.4	464.9
SNP	Ronnie Gurr	5.17	247	250.1	255.1	
Electorate: 9,811 Valid: 4,779 Spoilt: 42 Quota: 1,195 Turnout: 4,821 (48.71%)

=== Haddington and Lammermuir ===
- 2007: 1xCon; 1xSNP; 1xLib Dem
- 2012: 1xLab; 1xSNP; 1xCon
- 2007-2012 Change: Lab gain one seat from Lib Dem

Haddington and Lammermuir - 3 seats
Party	Candidate	FPv%	Count					
Party	Candidate	FPv%	1	2	3	4	5	6
Labour	John McMillan	33.38	1,522					
SNP	Tom Trotter (incumbent)	26.74	1,219					
Conservative	Ludovic Broun-Lindsay (incumbent)	19.92	908	961.7	971.8	1,004	1,076.1	1,483.3
Liberal Democrats	Kelvin Logan Pate	13.38	610	723.2	743.9	755.9	867.7	
Independent	David Barrett	4.98	227	276.4	289.9	313.4		
UKIP	Oluf George Marshall	1.60	73	86.1	90			
Electorate: 9,948 Valid: 4,559 Spoilt: 38 Quota: 1,140 Turnout: 4,597 (45.83%)

=== Dunbar and East Linton ===
- 2007: 1xSNP; 1xLib Dem; 1xLab
- 2012: 1xLab; 1xSNP; 1xCon
- 2007-2012 Change: Con gain one seat from Lib Dem

Dunbar and East Linton - 3 seats
Party	Candidate	FPv%	Count				
Party	Candidate	FPv%	1	2	3	4	5
Labour	Norman Hampshire (incumbent)	25.49	1,191				
SNP	Paul Stewart McLennan (incumbent)	24.78	1,158	1,160	1,195		
Conservative	Michael George Veitch	21.04	983	983.8	1,072.9	1,074.7	1,185.9
SNP	Isobel Margaret Knox	14.04	656	657.1	681.1	702.7	805.1
Labour	Hayley Flanagan	9.50	444	460.1	516.3	517.3	
Liberal Democrats	Ann Burt Taylor	5.16	241	241.5			
Electorate: 9,760 Valid: 4,673 Spoilt: 71 Quota: 1,169 Turnout: 4,744 (47.88%)

== Post Election Changes ==
- † On 6 March 2013 North Berwick Coastal SNP Cllr David Stuart Berry resigned from the party and became an Independent Nationalist after comparing the Union to slavery on Twitter.

== See Also ==
- East Lothian Council elections
