= East Lothian Council =

Unitary authority in East Lothian, Scotland

East Lothian Council Comhairle Lodainn an Ear
- Full council election every 5 years.
- Coat of arms

- East Lothian Council logo

Type
- Type: Unitary authority

History
- Preceded by: East Lothian District Council

Leadership
- Provost: John McMillan, Labour since 23 May 2017
- Leader: Norman Hampshire, Labour since 16 November 2021
- Chief Executive: Laurence Rockey since 22 April 2025

Structure
- Seats: 22
- Graph of the party split among 22 seats.
- Political groups: Administration (10) Labour (10) Other parties (12) SNP (6) Conservative (4) Green (1) Independent (1)

Elections
- Voting system: Single transferable vote
- Last election: 5 May 2022
- Next election: 2027

Meeting place
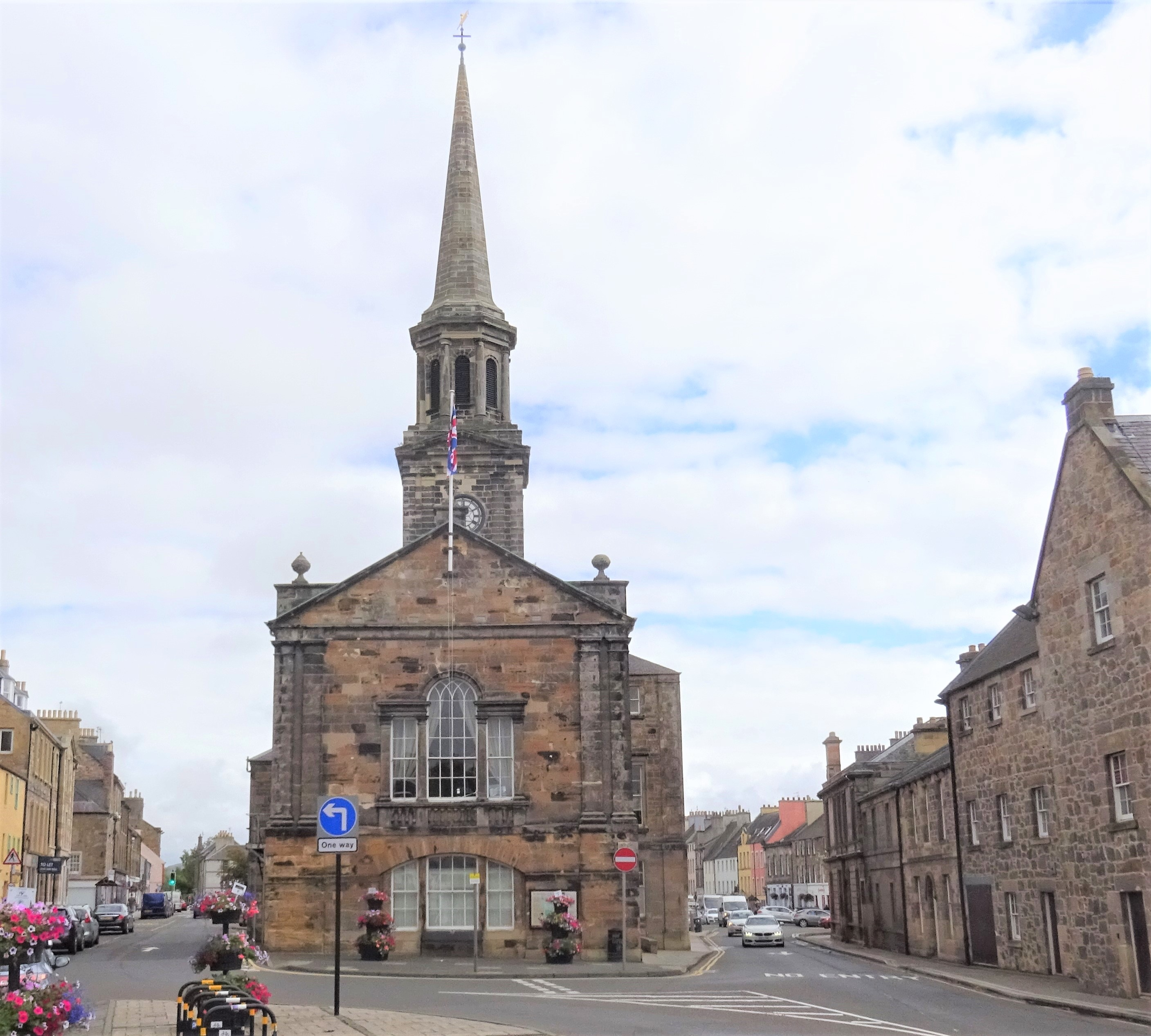
- Council Chamber, Haddington Town House

Website
- www.eastlothian.gov.uk

East Lothian Council (Scottish Gaelic: Comhairle Lodainn an Ear) is one of the 32 local government councils in Scotland covering the East Lothian area. Since the last boundary changes in 2017, 22 councillors have been elected from 6 wards.

== History ==
East Lothian District Council had been created in 1975 under the Local Government (Scotland) Act 1973, as one of four districts within the Lothian region (along with Edinburgh, Midlothian and West Lothian, each having some differences from the territory of their corresponding historic counties). All four districts of Lothian became single tier local authorities in 1996, under the Local Government etc. (Scotland) Act 1994, when the council adopted its current name as East Lothian Council.

== Political control ==
The council has been under no overall control since 2007. It has been run by a minority Labour minority administration since 2017.

The first election to the East Lothian District Council was held in 1974, initially operating as a shadow authority alongside the outgoing authorities until the new system came into force on 16 May 1975. A shadow authority was again elected in 1995 ahead of the reforms which came into force on 1 April 1996. Political control of the council since 1975 has been as follows:

East Lothian District Council

Party in control	Years
Labour	1975–1996

East Lothian Council

Party in control	Years
Labour	1996–2007
No overall control	2007–

=== Leadership ===
The leaders of the council since 1996 have been:

Councillor	Party	From	To
Norman Murray	Labour	1 Apr 1996	May 2007
David Berry	SNP	15 May 2007	8 Jun 2010
Paul McLennan	SNP	8 Jun 2010	May 2012
Willie Innes	Labour	15 May 2012	24 Oct 2021
Norman Hampshire	Labour	16 Nov 2021	

=== Composition ===
Following the 2022 election and subsequent changes up to July 2026, the composition of the council was:

Party	Seats
Labour	10
SNP	6
Conservative	4
Green	1
Independent	1
Total	22

The next election is due in 2027.

== Elections ==
Map of the area's single-member wards with the results of the 2003 East Lothian Council election, the last to use that system

Since 2007 elections have been held every five years under the single transferable vote system, introduced by the Local Governance (Scotland) Act 2004. Election results since 1995 have been as follows:

Year	Seats	Labour	SNP	Conservative	Green	Liberal Democrats	Independent / Other	Notes
1995	18	15	0	3	0	0	0	Labour majority
1999	23	17	1	5	0	0	0	New ward boundaries. Labour majority
2003	23	17	1	4	0	1	0	Labour majority
2007	23	7	7	2	0	6	0	New ward boundaries. SNP / Lib Dem coalition
2012	23	10	9	3	0	0	1	Labour / Conservative coalition
2017	22	9	6	7	0	0	1	New ward boundaries. Labour minority
2022	22	9	7	4	1	0	1 (Note: Appeared on Ballot as Labour and currently sits as a Labour councilor)	Labour minority

== Premises ==
The council is based at John Muir House, Haddington, which forms a modern extension to the County Buildings, Haddington, which had been the headquarters of the pre-1975 East Lothian County Council. Council meetings are held at Haddington Town House.

== Wards ==
Ward number	Ward name	Location	Seats
1	Musselburgh		4
2	Preston, Seton and Gosford		4
3	Tranent, Wallyford and Macmerry		4
4	North Berwick Coastal		3
5	Haddington and Lammermuir		4
6	Dunbar and East Linton		3
Total			22
