= 2007 East Lothian Council election =

Scottish local government election

- 3 May 2007

All 23 seats to East Lothian Council 12 seats needed for a majority
	First party	Second party	Third party
Party	Labour	SNP	Liberal Democrats
Last election	17 seats, 40.6%	1 seat, 19.2%	1 seat, 14.9%
Seats before	17	1	1
Seats won	7	7	6
Seat change	▼10	▲6	▲5
	Fourth party	Fifth party
Party	Conservative	Independent
Last election	4 seats, 23.1%	0 seats, 0.6%
Seats before	4	0
Seats won	2	1
Seat change	▼2	▲1
- The multi-member wards
Council Leader before election
Labour
Council Leader after election
Paul Stewart McLennan
SNP

Elections to East Lothian Council were held on 3 May 2007, the same day as the other Scottish local government elections and the Scottish Parliament general election.

The election was the first using seven new wards created as a result of the Local Governance (Scotland) Act 2004. Each ward elected three or four councillors using the single transferable vote system of proportional representation. The wards replaced 23 single-member wards which used the plurality (first past the post) system of election.

The Labour majority administration was replaced by a coalition between the SNP and Liberal Democrats, led by the SNP's Paul Stewart McLennan.

== Election results ==
East Lothian local election result 2007
Party	Seats	Gains	Losses	Net gain/loss	Seats %	Votes %	Votes	+/−
Labour	7	N\A	N\A	-9	30.4	32.6	13,514	
SNP	7	N\A	N\A	+6	30.4	26.9	11,157	
Liberal Democrats	6	N\A	N\A	+5	26.1	15.4	6,391	
Conservative	2	N\A	N\A	-2	8.7	17.4	7,209	
Green	0	N\A	N\A	0	0.0	1.6	674	
Solidarity	0	N\A	N\A	0	0.0	0.5	221	
Scottish Senior Citizens	0	N\A	N\A	0	0.0	0.2	75	
Independent	1	N\A	N\A	0	4.3	5.3	2,200	

== Ward results ==
Musselburgh West
Party	Candidate	FPv%	%	Seat	Count
SNP	John Williamson	1,427	30.7	1	1
Labour	John McNeil	1,144	24.6	2	2
Liberal Democrats	Barry Turner	857	18.4	3	5
Labour	John Ross	572	12.3		
Conservative	Robert Fairnie	499	10.7		
Solidarity	Jack Fraser	153	3.3		

Musselburgh East and Carberry
Party	Candidate	FPv%	%	Seat	Count
SNP	Roger Knox	1,256	25.1	1	1
Labour	Andy Forrest	1,057	21.1	2	5
Independent	John Caldwell	937	18.7	3	6
Liberal Democrats	Jenny Mollison	809	16.2		
Labour	Pat O'Donnell	585	11.7		
Conservative	Ian Robertson	281	5.6		
Scottish Senior Citizens	Alan Eeles	75	1.5		

Preston/Seton/Gosford
Party	Candidate	FPv%	%	Seat	Count
Labour	Willie Innes	2,205	30.5	1	1
SNP	Peter MacKenzie	1,906	26.4	2	1
Conservative	Michael Veitch	1,040	14.4		
Labour	Margaret Libberton	927	12.8	3	3
Liberal Democrats	Stuart Currie†	909	12.6	4	5
Independent	Andy Spence	244	3.4		

Fa'side
Party	Candidate	FPv%	%	Seat	Count
SNP	Kenny McLeod	2,065	30.4	1	1
Labour	Jim Gillies	1,348	19.8	2	2
Labour	Donald Grant	1,118	16.4	4	4
Liberal Democrats	Ruth Currie††	892	13.1	3	4
Labour	Robert McNeill	835	12.3		
Conservative	Henry Murray-Smith	540	7.9		

North Berwick Coastal
Party	Candidate	FPv%	%	Seat	Count
Conservative	Neil Rankin	1,837	29.7	1	1
SNP	David Berry	1,670	27.0	2	1
Labour	Pat Hanson	980	15.8		
Liberal Democrats	Stuart MacKinnon	747	12.1	3	5
Conservative	Kathryn Smith	565	9.1		
Green	Susan Moffat	393	6.3		

Haddington and Lammermuir
Party	Candidate	FPv%	%	Seat	Count
Conservative	Ludovic Broun-Lindsay	1,317	22.6	1	4
SNP	Tom Trotter	1,107	19.0	3	4
Liberal Democrats	Sheena Richardson	1,041	17.9	2	4
Independent	Charles Ingle	1,019	17.5		
Labour	Ann McCarthy	985	16.9		
Green	Eurig Scandrett	281	4.8		
Solidarity	Gary Galbraith	68	1.2		

Dunbar and East Linton
Party	Candidate	FPv%	%	Seat	Count
SNP	Paul McLennan	1,726	30.0	1	1
Liberal Democrats	Jacquie Bell	1,136	19.8	3	3
Conservative	Katie Mackie	1,130	19.7		
Labour	Norman Hampshire	1,033	18.0	2	3
Labour	Herbert Coutts	725	12.6		

== Changes after 2007 ==
- † Stuart Currie defected from the Liberal Democrats and joined the Scottish National Party on 11 August 2009
- †† Ruth Currie defected from the Liberal Democrats and joined the Scottish National Party on 11 August 2009

== See also ==
- East Lothian Council elections
