= Central Scotland (Scottish Parliament electoral region) =

Scottish electoral region

- Former electoral region for the Scottish Parliament
- Central Scotland shown within Scotland
- Population: 669,424 (2019)

Former electoral region
- Created: 1999
- Abolished: 2026
- MSPs: Scottish National Party 9 Conservative 2 Labour 3 Green 1 Reform 1
- Council areas: Falkirk; North Lanarkshire; South Lanarkshire (part)
- Constituencies: Airdrie and Shotts; Coatbridge and Chryston; Cumbernauld and Kilsyth; East Kilbride; Falkirk East; Falkirk West; Hamilton, Larkhall and Stonehouse; Motherwell and Wishaw; Uddingston and Bellshill
- Replaced by: Central Scotland and Lothians West

Central Scotland (Meadhan-Alba in Gaelic) was one of the eight electoral regions of the Scottish Parliament which were created in 1999. Nine of the parliament's 73 first past the post constituencies were sub-divisions of the region and it elected seven of the 56 additional-member Members of the Scottish Parliament (MSPs). Thus it elected a total of 16 MSPs.

Map of boundaries from 2011

As a result of the Second Periodic Review of Scottish Parliament Boundaries the region was replaced by Central Scotland and Lothians West for the 2026 Scottish Parliament election.

== Constituencies and council areas 2011–2026 ==
Map of boundaries from 2011

As a result of the First Periodic Review of Scottish Parliament Boundaries the boundaries for the region and constituencies were redrawn for the 2011 Scottish Parliament election.

| Region | Constituencies |
|---|---|
| | 1. Airdrie and Shotts; 2. Coatbridge and Chryston; 3. Cumbernauld and Kilsyth; 4. Hamilton, Larkhall and Stonehouse; 5. Falkirk East; 6. Falkirk West; 7. East Kilbride; 8. Motherwell and Wishaw; 9. Uddingston and Bellshill |

== Constituencies and council areas 1999–2011 ==
The constituencies were created in 1999 with the names and boundaries of Westminster constituencies, as existing in at that time. They cover all of two council areas, the Falkirk council area and the North Lanarkshire council area, and parts of three others, the East Ayrshire council area, the East Dumbartonshire council area and the South Lanarkshire council area.

The rest of the East Ayrshire council area is within the South of Scotland region, the rest of the East Dunbartonshire council area is within the West of Scotland region, and the rest of the South Lanarkshire council area is within the Glasgow and South of Scotland regions.

| Region | Constituencies |
|---|---|
| | 1. Airdrie and Shotts; 2. Coatbridge and Chryston; 3. Cumbernauld and Kilsyth; 4. East Kilbride; 5. Falkirk East; 6. Falkirk West; 7. Hamilton North and Bellshill; 8. Hamilton South; 9. Kilmarnock and Loudoun; 10. Motherwell and Wishaw |

== Boundary changes ==
The Boundary Commission recommended changes to the electoral regions used to elect "list" members of the Scottish Parliament. The new "Central Scotland" region was formed from the constituencies of Airdrie and Shotts; Coatbridge and Chryston; Cumbernauld and Kilsyth; East Kilbride; Falkirk East; Falkirk West; Hamilton, Lanark and Stonehouse; Motherwell and Wishaw; and Uddingston and Bellshill.

== Members of the Scottish Parliament ==
=== Constituency MSPs ===
| Term | Election | Airdrie and Shotts | Coatbridge and Chryston | Cumbernauld and Kilsyth | East Kilbride | Falkirk East | Falkirk West | Hamilton North and Bellshill | Hamilton South | Motherwell and Wishaw | Kilmarnock and Loudoun |
|---|---|---|---|---|---|---|---|---|---|---|---|
| 1st | 1999 | Karen Whitefield (Labour) | Elaine Smith (Labour) | Cathy Craigie (Labour) | Andy Kerr (Labour) | Cathy Peattie (Labour) | Dennis Canavan (Independent) | Michael McMahon (Labour) | Tom McCabe (Labour) | Jack McConnell (Labour) | Margaret Jamieson (Labour) |
| 2nd | 2003 | Karen Whitefield (Labour) | Elaine Smith (Labour) | Cathy Craigie (Labour) | Andy Kerr (Labour) | Cathy Peattie (Labour) | Dennis Canavan (Independent) | Michael McMahon (Labour) | Tom McCabe (Labour) | Jack McConnell (Labour) | Margaret Jamieson (Labour) |
| 3rd | 2007 | Karen Whitefield (Labour) | Elaine Smith (Labour) | Cathy Craigie (Labour) | Andy Kerr (Labour) | Cathy Peattie (Labour) | Michael Matheson (SNP) | Michael McMahon (Labour) | Tom McCabe (Labour) | Jack McConnell (Labour) | Willie Coffey (SNP) |
| Term | Election | Airdrie and Shotts | Coatbridge and Chryston | Cumbernauld and Kilsyth | East Kilbride | Falkirk East | Falkirk West | Uddingston and Bellshill | Hamilton, Larkhall and Stonehouse | Motherwell and Wishaw | 9 MSPs, 2011– (area covered by former constituency moved to the South Scotland region) |
| 4th | 2011 | Alex Neil (SNP) | Elaine Smith (Labour) | Jamie Hepburn (SNP) | Linda Fabiani (SNP) | Angus MacDonald (SNP) | Michael Matheson (SNP) | Michael McMahon (Labour) | Christina McKelvie (SNP) | John Pentland (Labour) | 9 MSPs, 2011– (area covered by former constituency moved to the South Scotland region) |
| 5th | 2016 | Alex Neil (SNP) | Fulton MacGregor (SNP) | Jamie Hepburn (SNP) | Linda Fabiani (SNP) | Angus MacDonald (SNP) | Michael Matheson (SNP) | Richard Lyle (SNP) | Christina McKelvie (SNP) | Clare Adamson (SNP) | 9 MSPs, 2011– (area covered by former constituency moved to the South Scotland region) |
| 6th | 2021 | Neil Gray (SNP) | Fulton MacGregor (SNP) | Jamie Hepburn (SNP) | Collette Stevenson (SNP) | Michelle Thomson (SNP) | Michael Matheson (SNP) | Stephanie Callaghan (SNP) | Christina McKelvie (SNP) | Clare Adamson (SNP) | 9 MSPs, 2011– (area covered by former constituency moved to the South Scotland region) |

=== Regional list MSPs ===
N.B. This table is for presentation purposes only

| Parliament | Year | MSP | MSP | MSP | MSP | MSP | MSP | MSP |
|---|---|---|---|---|---|---|---|---|
| 1st | 1999 | Donald Gorrie (Liberal Democrat) | Andrew Wilson (SNP) | Alex Neil (SNP) | Linda Fabiani (SNP) | Michael Matheson (SNP) | Gil Paterson (SNP) | Lyndsay McIntosh (Conservative) |
| 2nd | 2003 | Donald Gorrie (Liberal Democrat) | Carolyn Leckie (SSP) | Alex Neil (SNP) | Linda Fabiani (SNP) | Michael Matheson (SNP) | John Swinburne (SSCUP) | Margaret Mitchell (Conservative) |
| 3rd | 2007 | Hugh O'Donnell (Liberal Democrat) (later Independent) | Jamie Hepburn (SNP) | Alex Neil (SNP) | Linda Fabiani (SNP) | Christina McKelvie (SNP) | John Wilson (SNP) (later Independent) | Margaret Mitchell (Conservative) |
| 4th | 2011 | Mark Griffin (Labour) | Siobhan McMahon (Labour) | Margaret McCulloch (Labour) | Richard Lyle (SNP) | Clare Adamson (SNP) | John Wilson (SNP) (later Independent) | Margaret Mitchell (Conservative) |
| 4th | 2014 | Mark Griffin (Labour) | Siobhan McMahon (Labour) | Margaret McCulloch (Labour) | Richard Lyle (SNP) | Clare Adamson (SNP) | John Wilson (SNP) (later Independent) | Margaret Mitchell (Conservative) |
| 5th | 2016 | Mark Griffin (Labour) | Richard Leonard (Labour) | Monica Lennon (Labour) | Elaine Smith (Labour) | Graham Simpson (Conservative) | Alison Harris (Conservative) | Margaret Mitchell (Conservative) |
| 6th | 2021 | Mark Griffin (Labour) | Richard Leonard (Labour) | Monica Lennon (Labour) | Gillian Mackay (Green) | Graham Simpson (Conservative) | Stephen Kerr (Conservative) | Meghan Gallacher (Conservative) |

== Election results ==
=== 2021 Scottish Parliament election ===
In the 2021 Scottish Parliament election the region elected MSPs as follows:

- 9 SNP MSPs (constituency members)
- 3 Labour MSPs (additional members)
- 3 Conservative MSPs (additional members)
- 1 Green MSP (additional member)

==== Constituency results ====
2021 Scottish Parliament election: Central Scotland
| Constituency | Elected member | Result |
|---|---|---|
| Airdrie and Shotts | Neil Gray | SNP hold |
| Coatbridge and Chryston | Fulton MacGregor | SNP hold |
| Cumbernauld and Kilsyth | Jamie Hepburn | SNP hold |
| East Kilbride | Collette Stevenson | SNP hold |
| Falkirk East | Michelle Thomson | SNP hold |
| Falkirk West | Michael Matheson | SNP hold |
| Hamilton, Larkhall and Stonehouse | Christina McKelvie | SNP hold |
| Motherwell and Wishaw | Clare Adamson | SNP hold |
| Uddingston and Bellshill | Stephanie Callaghan | SNP hold |

==== Additional Member results ====
2021 Scottish Parliament election: Central Scotland
| List | Candidates | Votes | Of total (%) | ± from prev. |
|---|---|---|---|---|
| SNP | Danish Ashraf, Christina McKelvie, Neil Gray, Michelle Thomson, Fulton MacGregor, Stephanie Callaghan, Grant Ferguson, Iain Sinclair, Paul Welsh, Josh Wilson, Cameron McManus | 148,399 | 45.3 | ▼2.4 |
| Labour | Richard Leonard, Monica Lennon, Mark Griffin, Monique McAdams, Chris Costello, Michael McPake, Allyson Black | 77,623 | 23.7 | ▼1.1 |
| Conservative | Stephen Kerr, Graham Simpson, Meghan Gallacher, Haroun Malik, Neil Benny, Ross Lambie, Nathan Wilson, Gordon Macdonald, Bryan Flannagan | 59,896 | 18.3 | ▲2.2 |
| Green | Gillian Mackay, Rosemary McGowan, Claire Williams, Tom McLaughlin, Patrick McAleer, Kyle Davidson, James Stuart Duffin | 19,512 | 6.0 | ▲1.3 |
| Liberal Democrats | Paul McGarry, Mark McGeever, Dawn Allan, Graham Watson, Ewan McRobert, Karen Utting, Austin Reid | 6,337 | 1.9 | 0.0 |
| Alba | Tasmina Ahmed-Sheikh, Lynne Anderson, Jim Walker, Margaret Lynch | 5,345 | 1.6 | ▲1.6 |
| All for Unity | Mary Devlin, Jonathan Stanley, Matt Alexander, Sandra Hill, Billy Ross, Sandy Smart, Lachlan Macneil | 2,712 | 0.8 | ▲0.8 |
| Scottish Family | Leo Lanahan, Josh McGrory, Helen MacEachen, Christine MacIver, Christopher Hendry | 2,105 | 0.6 | ▲0.6 |
| Independent Green Voice | John Robertson | 1,854 | 0.6 | ▲0.6 |
| Abolish the Scottish Parliament | John Mortimer, Lee McLauchlan | 841 | 0.3 | ▲0.3 |
| Reform | Alan Melville, Hugh Skinner, Alexander MacGregor, Ann Murray | 650 | 0.2 | ▲0.2 |
| Scottish Libertarian | Mark Meechan, Katrina Angus | 626 | 0.2 | ▲0.2 |
| Freedom Alliance | Dave Frankland, Claire McClaren, John Irvine, Louise Bannigan, Di Meechan, Colin McMillan | 619 | 0.2 | ▲0.2 |
| Independent | Paddy Hogg | 488 | 0.2 | ▲0.1 |
| UKIP | Neil Wilson, Yvonne Mackay, Steven Unwin, George Cowan | 485 | 0.2 | ▼2.0 |

=== 2016 Scottish Parliament election ===
In the 2016 Scottish Parliament election the region elected MSPs as follows:

- 9 SNP MSPs (constituency members)
- 4 Labour MSPs (additional members)
- 3 Conservative MSPs (additional members)

==== Constituency results ====
2016 Scottish Parliament general election: Central Scotland
| Constituency | Elected member | Result |
|---|---|---|
| Airdrie and Shotts | Alex Neil | SNP hold |
| Coatbridge and Chryston | Fulton MacGregor | SNP gain from Labour |
| Cumbernauld and Kilsyth | Jamie Hepburn | SNP hold |
| East Kilbride | Linda Fabiani | SNP hold |
| Falkirk East | Angus MacDonald | SNP hold |
| Falkirk West | Michael Matheson | SNP hold |
| Hamilton, Larkhall and Stonehouse | Christina McKelvie | SNP hold |
| Motherwell and Wishaw | Clare Adamson | SNP gain from Labour |
| Uddingston and Bellshill | Richard Lyle | SNP gain from Labour |

==== Additional Member results ====
2016 Scottish Parliament election: Central Scotland
| Party | Elected candidates | Seats | +/− | Votes | % | +/−% |
|---|---|---|---|---|---|---|
| SNP | | 0 | -3 | 129,082 | 47.7 | +1.3 |
| Labour | Richard Leonard; Monica Lennon; Mark Griffin; Elaine Smith | 4 | +1 | 67,103 | 24.8 | -10.5 |
| Conservative | Margaret Mitchell; Graham Simpson; Alison Harris | 3 | +2 | 43,602 | 16.1 | +9.7 |
| Green | | 0 | 0 | 12,722 | 4.7 | +2.3 |
| UKIP | | 0 | 0 | 6,088 | 2.2 | +1.7 |
| Liberal Democrats | | 0 | 0 | 5,015 | 1.9 | +0.4 |
| Solidarity | | 0 | 0 | 2,684 | 1.0 | +0.8 |
| Scottish Christian | | 0 | 0 | 2,314 | 0.9 | -0.5 |
| RISE | | 0 | 0 | 1,636 | 0.6 | N/A |
| Independent | | 0 | 0 | 460 | 0.2 | +0.2 |

=== 2011 Scottish Parliament election ===
In the 2011 Scottish Parliament election the region elected MSPs as follows:

- 9 Scottish National Party MSPs (six constituency members and three additional members)
- 6 Labour MSPs (three constituency members and three additional members)
- 1 Conservative MSP (additional member)

==== Constituency results ====
Scottish Parliament general election, 2011: Central Scotland
| Constituency | Elected member | Result |
|---|---|---|
| Airdrie and Shotts | Alex Neil | SNP gain from Labour |
| Coatbridge and Chryston | Elaine Smith | Labour hold |
| Cumbernauld and Kilsyth | Jamie Hepburn | SNP gain from Labour |
| East Kilbride | Linda Fabiani | SNP gain from Labour |
| Falkirk East | Angus MacDonald | SNP gain from Labour |
| Falkirk West | Michael Matheson | SNP hold |
| Hamilton, Larkhall and Stonehouse | Christina McKelvie | SNP gain from Labour |
| Motherwell and Wishaw | John Pentland | Labour hold |
| Uddingston and Bellshill | Michael McMahon | Labour hold |

==== Additional Member results ====
2011 Scottish Parliament election: Central Scotland
| Party | Elected candidates | Seats | +/− | Votes | % | +/−% |
|---|---|---|---|---|---|---|
| SNP | Richard Lyle; John Wilson; Clare Adamson | 3 | -2 | 108,261 | 46.4 | +15.5 |
| Labour | Siobhan McMahon; Mark Griffin; Margaret McCulloch | 3 | +3 | 82,459 | 35.3 | -4.6 |
| Conservative | Margaret Mitchell | 1 | ±0 | 14,870 | 6.4 | -1.0 |
| All Scotland Pensioners Party | | 0 | 0 | 5,793 | 2.5 | -0.1 |
| Green | | 0 | 0 | 5,634 | 2.4 | -0.1 |
| Liberal Democrats | | 0 | -1 | 3,318 | 1.4 | -3.8 |
| Scottish Christian | | 0 | 0 | 3,173 | 1.4 | -0.7 |
| Socialist Labour | | 0 | 0 | 2,483 | 1.1 | +0.3 |
| BNP | | 0 | 0 | 2,214 | 0.9 | -0.5 |
| Scottish Unionist | | 0 | 0 | 1,545 | 0.7 | +0.1 |
| UKIP | | 0 | 0 | 1,263 | 0.5 | +0.3 |
| Independent | | 0 | 0 | 821 | 0.4 | N/A |
| Scottish Socialist | | 0 | 0 | 820 | 0.4 | -0.6 |
| Solidarity | | 0 | 0 | 559 | 0.2 | -1.5 |
| Scottish Homeland Party | | 0 | 0 | 337 | 0.1 | N/A |

=== 2007 Scottish Parliament election ===
| Party | Member of the Scottish Parliament | | | | Total Members | +/– |
| Party | Constituency | +/– | Regional | +/– | Total Members | +/– |
|---|---|---|---|---|---|---|
| Labour | 8 | −1 | 0 | ±0 | 8 | −1 |
| SNP | 2 | +2 | 5 | +2 | 7 | +4 |
| Conservative | 0 | ±0 | 1 | ±0 | 1 | ±0 |
| Liberal Democrats | 0 | ±0 | 1 | ±0 | 1 | ±0 |

==== Constituency results ====
2007 Scottish Parliament election: Central Scotland
| Constituency | Elected member | Result |
|---|---|---|
| Airdrie and Shotts | Karen Whitefield | Labour hold |
| Coatbridge and Chryston | Elaine Smith | Labour hold |
| Cumbernauld and Kilsyth | Cathie Craigie | Labour hold |
| East Kilbride | Andy Kerr | Labour hold |
| Falkirk East | Cathy Peattie | Labour hold |
| Falkirk West | Michael Matheson | SNP gain from Independent |
| Hamilton North and Bellshill | Michael McMahon | Labour hold |
| Hamilton South | Tom McCabe | Labour hold |
| Kilmarnock and Loudoun | Willie Coffey | SNP gain from Labour |
| Motherwell and Wishaw | Jack McConnell | Labour hold |

==== Additional member results ====
2007 Scottish Parliament election: Central Scotland
| Party | Elected candidates | Seats | +/− | Votes | % | +/−% |
|---|---|---|---|---|---|---|
| Labour | | 0 | 0 | 112,596 | 39.6 | -0.8 |
| SNP | Alex Neil; Linda Fabiani; Jamie Hepburn; Christina McKelvie; John Wilson | 5 | +2 | 89,210 | 31.4 | +8.8 |
| Conservative | Margaret Mitchell | 1 | ±0 | 24,253 | 8.5 | -0.6 |
| Liberal Democrats | Hugh O'Donnell | 1 | ±0 | 14,648 | 5.2 | -0.7 |
| Green | | 0 | 0 | 7,204 | 2.5 | -2.1 |
| Scottish Senior Citizens | | 0 | -1 | 7,060 | 2.5 | -4.0 |
| Scottish Christian | | 0 | 0 | 5,575 | 2.0 | N/A |
| Solidarity | | 0 | 0 | 5,012 | 1.8 | N/A |
| CPA | | 0 | 0 | 4,617 | 1.6 | N/A |
| BNP | | 0 | 0 | 4,125 | 1.4 | N/A |
| Socialist Labour | | 0 | 0 | 2,303 | 0.8 | -0.7 |
| Scottish Socialist | | 0 | -1 | 2,188 | 0.8 | -6.5 |
| Scottish Voice | | 0 | 0 | 1,955 | 0.7 | N/A |
| Scottish Unionist | | 0 | 0 | 1,544 | 0.5 | -0.3 |
| Publican Party | | 0 | 0 | 1,500 | 0.5 | N/A |
| UKIP | | 0 | 0 | 722 | 0.2 | -0.1 |

=== 2003 Scottish Parliament election ===
In the 2003 Scottish Parliament election the region elected MSPs as follows:

- 9 Labour MSPs (nine constituency members)
- 3 Scottish National Party MSPs (three additional members)
- 1 Independent MSP (one constituency member)
- 1 Conservative MSP (one additional member)
- 1 Liberal Democrat MSP (one additional member)
- 1 Scottish Senior Citizens MSP (one additional member)
- 1 Scottish Socialist Party MSP (one additional member)

==== Constituency results ====
2003 Scottish Parliament election: Central Scotland
| Constituency | Elected member | Result |
|---|---|---|
| Airdrie and Shotts | Karen Whitefield | Labour hold |
| Coatbridge and Chryston | Elaine Smith | Labour hold |
| Cumbernauld and Kilsyth | Cathie Craigie | Labour hold |
| East Kilbride | Andy Kerr | Labour hold |
| Falkirk East | Cathy Peattie | Labour hold |
| Falkirk West | Dennis Canavan | Independent hold |
| Hamilton North and Bellshill | Michael McMahon | Labour hold |
| Hamilton South | Tom McCabe | Labour hold |
| Kilmarnock and Loudoun | Margaret Jamieson | Labour hold |
| Motherwell and Wishaw | Jack McConnell | Labour hold |

==== Additional member results ====
2003 Scottish Parliament election: Central Scotland
| Party | Elected candidates | Seats | +/− | Votes | % | +/−% |
|---|---|---|---|---|---|---|
| Labour | | 0 | 0 | 106,318 | 40.41 | +1.13 |
| SNP | Alex Neil; Michael Matheson; Linda Fabiani | 3 | −2 | 59,274 | 22.53 | -5.25 |
| Conservative | Margaret Mitchell | 1 | ±0 | 24,121 | 9.17 | +0.02 |
| Scottish Socialist | Carolyn Leckie | 1 | +1 | 19,016 | 7.23 | +5.49 |
| Scottish Senior Citizens | John Swinburne | 1 | +1 | 17,146 | 6.52 | N/A |
| Liberal Democrats | Donald Gorrie | 1 | ±0 | 15,494 | 5.89 | -0.31 |
| Green | | 0 | 0 | 12,248 | 4.66 | +2.87 |
| Socialist Labour | | 0 | 0 | 3,855 | 1.47 | -1.85 |
| Scottish Unionist | | 0 | 0 | 2,147 | 0.82 | -0.05 |
| Independent | | 0 | 0 | 1,265 | 0.48 | N/A |
| Scottish People's | | 0 | 0 | 1,192 | 0.45 | N/A |
| UKIP | | 0 | 0 | 1,009 | 0.38 | N/A |

=== 1999 Scottish Parliament election ===
In the 1999 Scottish Parliament election the region elected MSPs as follows:

- 9 Labour MSPs (nine constituency members)
- 5 Scottish National Party MSPs (five additional members)
- 1 Independent (one constituency member)
- 1 Conservative MSP (one additional member)
- 1 Liberal Democrat MSPs (one additional member)

==== Constituency results ====
1999 Scottish Parliament election: Central Scotland
| Constituency | Elected member | Result |
|---|---|---|
| Airdrie and Shotts | Karen Whitefield | Scottish Labour Party win (new seat) |
| Coatbridge and Chryston | Elaine Smith | Scottish Labour Party win (new seat) |
| Cumbernauld and Kilsyth | Cathie Craigie | Scottish Labour Party win (new seat) |
| East Kilbride | Andy Kerr | Scottish Labour Party win (new seat) |
| Falkirk East | Cathy Peattie | Scottish Labour Party win (new seat) |
| Falkirk West | Dennis Canavan | Independent (politician) win (new seat) |
| Hamilton North and Bellshill | Michael McMahon | Scottish Labour Party win (new seat) |
| Hamilton South | Tom McCabe | Scottish Labour Party win (new seat) |
| Kilmarnock and Loudoun | Margaret Jamieson | Scottish Labour Party win (new seat) |
| Motherwell and Wishaw | Jack McConnell | Scottish Labour Party win (new seat) |

==== Additional member results ====
1999 Scottish Parliament election: Central Scotland
| Party | Elected candidates | Seats | +/− | Votes | % | +/−% |
|---|---|---|---|---|---|---|
| Labour | | 0 | N/A | 129,822 | 39.28 | N/A |
| SNP | Alex Neil; Andrew Wilson; Michael Matheson; Gil Paterson; Linda Fabiani | 5 | N/A | 91,802 | 27.78 | N/A |
| Conservative | Lyndsay McIntosh | 1 | N/A | 30,243 | 9.15 | N/A |
| Independent | | 0 | N/A | 27,700 | 8.38 | N/A |
| Liberal Democrats | Donald Gorrie | 1 | N/A | 20,505 | 6.20 | N/A |
| Socialist Labour | | 0 | N/A | 10,956 | 3.32 | N/A |
| Green | | 0 | N/A | 5,926 | 3.32 | N/A |
| Scottish Socialist | | 0 | N/A | 5,739 | 1.74 | N/A |
| Scottish Unionist | | 0 | N/A | 2,888 | 0.87 | N/A |
| ProLife Alliance | | 0 | N/A | 2,567 | 0.78 | N/A |
| Scottish Families and Pensioners Party | | 0 | N/A | 1,373 | 0.42 | N/A |
| Natural Law | | 0 | N/A | 1,373 | 0.42 | N/A |
| Independent Progressive | | 0 | N/A | 248 | 0.08 | N/A |
