= 2007 Scottish Parliament election =

- 3 May 2007

All 129 seats to the Scottish Parliament 65 seats needed for a majority
- Opinion polls
- Registered: 3,899,472
- Turnout: Constituency - 53.9% ▲4.2pp Regional - 54.0% ▲4.3pp
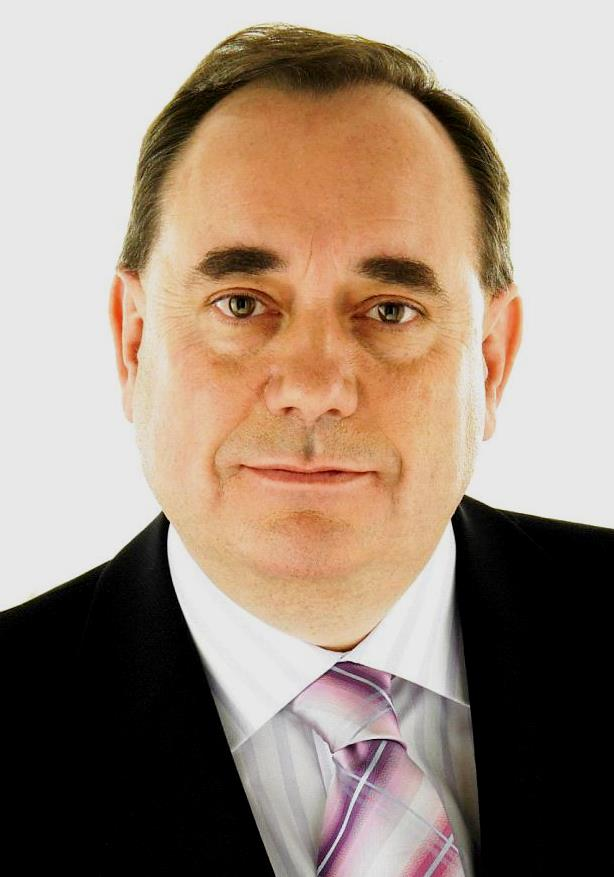

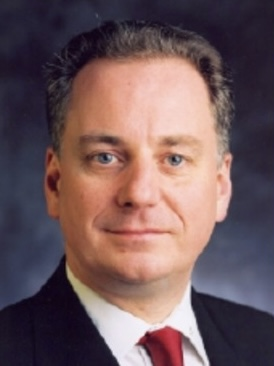

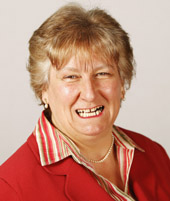

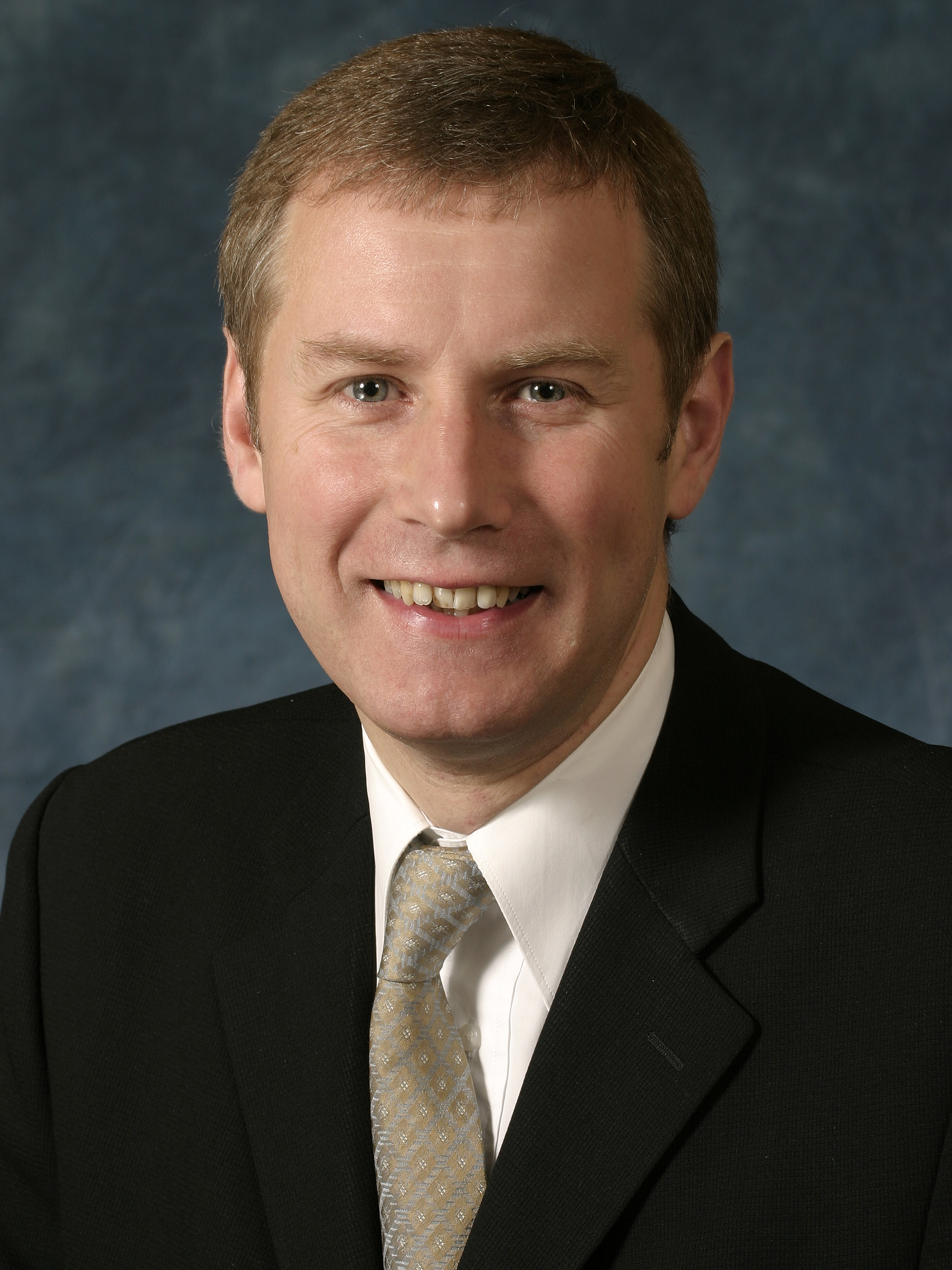

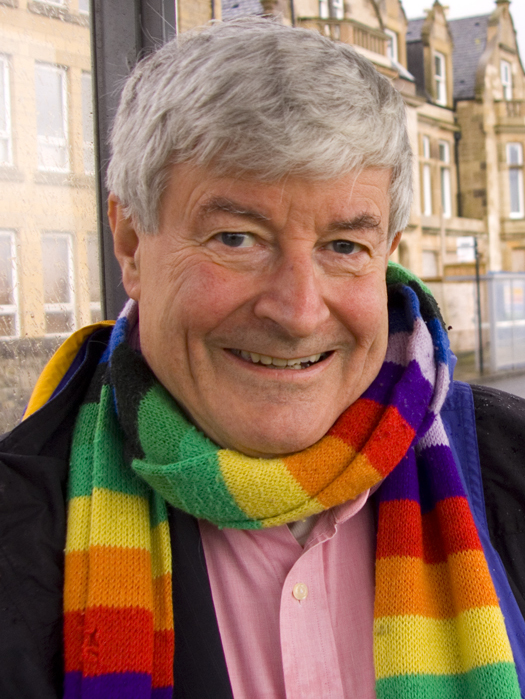

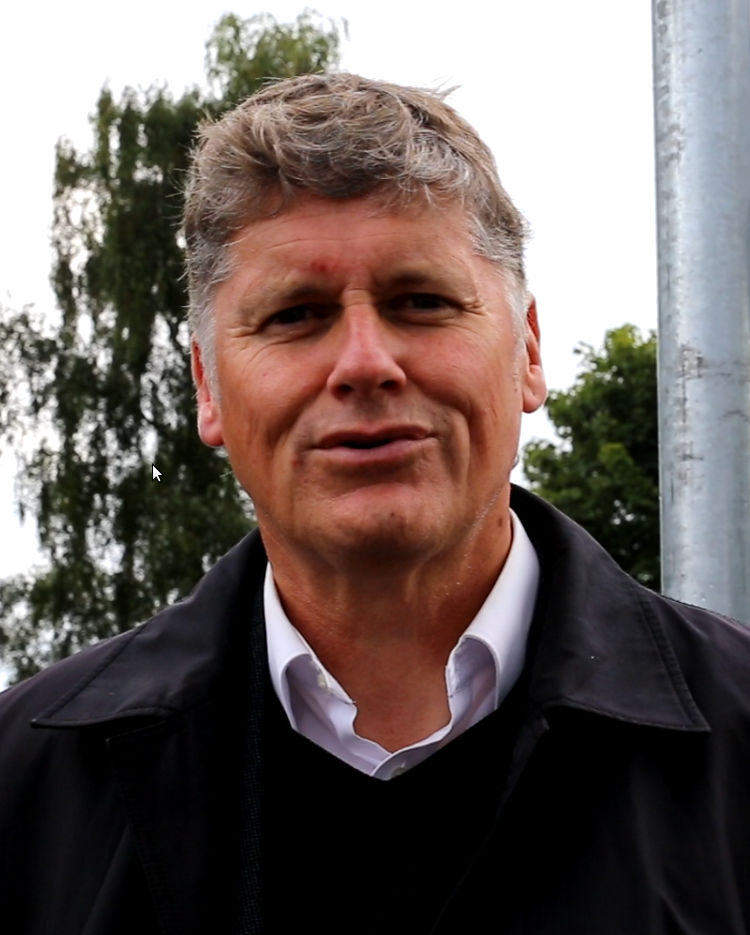
	First party	Second party	Third party
Leader	Alex Salmond	Jack McConnell	Annabel Goldie
Party	SNP	Labour	Conservative
Leader since	3 September 2004	22 November 2001	8 November 2005
Leader's seat	Ran in Gordon (won)	Motherwell and Wishaw	West of Scotland
Last election	27 seats	50 (Note: Includes 10 MSPs sponsored by the Co-operative Party, who are designated Labour and Co-operative.) seats	18 seats
Seats before	25	50 (Note: Includes 10 MSPs sponsored by the Co-operative Party, who are designated Labour and Co-operative.)	17
Seats won	47	46 (Note: Includes 14 MSPs sponsored by the Co-operative Party, who are designated Labour and Co-operative.)	17
Seat change	▲20	▼4	▼1
Constituency vote	664,227	648,374	334,743
% and swing	32.9% ▲9.1%	32.1% ▼2.5%	16.6%
Regional vote	633,611	595,415	284,035
% and swing	31.0% ▲10.1%	29.2% ▼0.2%	13.9% ▼1.6%
	Fourth party	Fifth party	Sixth party
Leader	Nicol Stephen	Robin Harper / Shiona Baird	Colin Fox
Party	Liberal Democrats	Green	Scottish Socialist
Leader since	23 June 2005	30 October 2004	13 February 2005
Leader's seat	Aberdeen South	Lothians / North East Scotland (defeated)	Lothians (defeated)
Last election	17 seats	7 seats	6 seats
Seats before	17	7	4
Seats won	16	2	0
Seat change	▼1	▼5	▼6
Constituency vote	326,232	2,971	525
% and swing	16.2% ▲0.8%	0.1% ▲0.1%	0.0% ▼6.2%
Regional vote	230,651	82,577	13,096
% and swing	11.3% ▼0.5%	4.0% ▼2.9%	0.6% ▼6.1%
- The map shows the election results in single-member constituencies. The additional member MSPs in the 8 regions are shown around the map.
First Minister before election
Jack McConnell (Labour)
Labour–Liberal Democrats
First Minister and Government after election
Alex Salmond
SNP

An election for the Scottish Parliament was held on Thursday 3 May 2007 to elect members to the Scottish Parliament. It was the third general election to the devolved Scottish Parliament since it was created in 1999. Local elections in Scotland fell on the same day.

The Scottish National Party emerged as the largest party with 47 seats, closely followed by the incumbent Scottish Labour Party with 46 seats. The Scottish Conservatives won 17 seats, the Scottish Liberal Democrats 16 seats, the Scottish Greens two seats and one Independent (Margo MacDonald) was also elected. The SNP initially approached the Liberal Democrats for a coalition government, but the Lib Dems turned them down. Ultimately, the Greens agreed to provide the numbers to vote in an SNP minority government, with SNP leader Alex Salmond as First Minister.

The Scottish Socialist Party and the Scottish Senior Citizens Unity Party, which won seats in the 2003 election, lost all of their seats. Former MSP Tommy Sheridan's new party, Solidarity, also failed to win any seats. Campbell Martin and Jean Turner both lost their seats, and Dennis Canavan and Brian Monteith retired.

== Background ==
The main issues during the campaign trail were healthcare, education, council tax reform, pensions, the Union, Trident (the submarines are based in Scotland), the Iraq War and more powers for the Scottish Parliament. Some parties proposed raise the school leaving age from 16 to 18 and raising the minimum age to purchase tobacco products from 16 to 18.

Jack McConnell, as First Minister, entered the election defending a small overall majority of five seats via a coalition of Labour and the Liberal Democrats. The Lab-LD social liberal coalition had been in power, with three different First Ministers, since the first Scottish Parliament election in 1999. Opinion polls suggested its majority could be lost in 2007, due to falling support for the Labour Party and rising support for other parties, in particular the Scottish National Party (SNP). The polls suggested that no single party was likely to acquire an overall majority, nor was there an obvious alternative coalition ready to form a new Executive.

A TNS Poll in November 2006 gave Labour an 8% lead over the SNP which was second behind Labour in terms of numbers of Members of the Scottish Parliament (MSPs). As the election approached the SNP gained support while Labour's support declined. Based on pre-election projections, there could have been some possibility of an SNP–Liberal Democrat coalition, which might have extended to include the Scottish Green Party. The other parties represented in the Parliament before the election were the Scottish Conservative Party, the Scottish Socialist Party (SSP), Solidarity and the Scottish Senior Citizens Unity Party. (Solidarity was a new party, having broken away from the SSP in 2006.)

Other parties that campaigned for seats in Holyrood included the UK Independence Party (UKIP), the British National Party (BNP), the Scottish Unionist Party, the Scottish Socialist Labour Party, the Christian Peoples Alliance, the Scottish Christian Party.

=== Retiring MSPs ===
==== Labour ====
- Susan Deacon, Edinburgh East and Musselburgh
- John Home Robertson, East Lothian
- Janis Hughes, Glasgow Rutherglen
- Kate Maclean, Dundee West

==== Scottish National Party ====
- Bruce McFee, West of Scotland list
- George Reid, Ochil

==== Conservative ====
- Phil Gallie, South of Scotland list
- James Douglas-Hamilton, Lothians list

==== Liberal Democrats ====
- Donald Gorrie, Central Scotland list
- Jim Wallace, Orkney

==== Scottish Socialist Party ====
- Frances Curran, West of Scotland list

==== Independents ====
- Dennis Canavan, Falkirk West
- Brian Monteith (elected as a Conservative), Mid Scotland and Fife list

=== Defeated MSPs ===
==== Labour ====
- Gordon Jackson, Glasgow Govan
- Sylvia Jackson, Stirling
- Margaret Jamieson, Kilmarnock and Loudoun
- Maureen Macmillan, Highlands and Islands
- Christine May, Fife Central
- Alasdair Morrison, Western Isles
- Bristow Muldoon, Livingston
- Allan Wilson, Cunninghame North

==== Lib Dem ====
- Andrew Arbuckle, Mid Scotland and Fife
- Nora Radcliffe, Gordon
- Euan Robson, Roxburgh and Berwickshire
- George Lyon, Argyll and Bute

==== Conservative ====
- Dave Petrie, Highlands and Islands
- Murray Tosh, West of Scotland

==== Scottish Greens ====
- Shiona Baird, North East Scotland
- Chris Ballance, South of Scotland
- Mark Ballard, Lothians
- Mark Ruskell, Mid Scotland and Fife
- Eleanor Scott, Highlands and Islands

==== Scottish Socialist Party ====
- Colin Fox, Lothians
- Rosie Kane, Glasgow
- Carolyn Leckie, Central Scotland

==== Solidarity ====
- Rosemary Byrne, South of Scotland - originally elected as Scottish Socialist Party
- Tommy Sheridan, Glasgow - originally elected as Scottish Socialist Party

==== Scottish Senior Citizens Unity Party ====
- John Swinburne, Central Scotland

==== Independent ====
- Campbell Martin, West of Scotland - Former SNP MSP
- Jean Turner, Strathkelvin and Bearsden

== Results ==
Election result with constituency names labeled (Liberal Democrats won Dunfermline West, not Labour)

Party	Constituency				Regional				Total seats	+/–
Party	Votes	%	+/–	Seats	Votes	%	+/–	Seats	Total seats	+/–
Scottish National Party	664,227	32.93	+9.15	21	633,611	31.02	+10.16	26	47	+20
Labour	648,374	32.15	–2.48	37	595,415	29.15	–0.15	9	46	–4
Conservatives	334,743	16.60	–0.01	4	284,035	13.90	–1.59	13	17	–1
Liberal Democrats	326,232	16.17	+0.82	11	230,651	11.29	–0.49	5	16	–1
Greens	2,971	0.15	+0.15	0	82,577	4.04	–2.85	2	2	–5
Scottish Senior Citizens Unity Party	1,702	0.08	+0.00	0	39,038	1.91	+0.40	0	0	–1
Christian Party	4,586	0.23	New	0	26,575	1.30	New	0	0	New
Solidarity					31,096	1.52	New	0	0	New
British National Party					24,598	1.20	+1.1	0	0	0
Christian Peoples Alliance					14,745	0.72	New	0	0	New
Socialist Labour Party					14,054	0.69	–0.44	0	0	0
Scottish Socialist Party	525	0.03	–6.17	0	13,096	0.64	–6.04	0	0	–6
UK Independence Party					8,197	0.40	–0.22	0	0	0
Scottish Voice	2,827	0.14	New	0	3,339	0.16	New	0	0	New
Publican Party					5,905	0.29	New	0	0	New
Scottish Unionist Party					4,401	0.22	–0.10	0	0	0
Action to Save St John's Hospital	2,814	0.14	New	0					0	New
Save Our NHS Group					2,682	0.13	New	0	0	New
NHS First					1,955	0.10	New	0	0	New
Free Scotland Party	575	0.03	New	0	664	0.03	New	0	0	New
Had Enough Party	498	0.02	New	0	670	0.03	New	0	0	New
Scottish Enterprise Party	409	0.02	New	0	616	0.03	New	0	0	New
Adam Lyal's Witchery Tour Party					867	0.04	–0.01	0	0	0
Scottish Jacobite Party	309	0.02	New	0	446	0.02	New	0	0	New
Scottish Voice / NHS					661	0.03	New	0	0	New
Scotland Against Crooked Lawyers					615	0.03	New	0	0	New
Peace Party	577	0.03	New	0					0	New
Communist Party of Britain	251	0.01	New	0	260	0.01	New	0	0	New
Independent Green Voice					496	0.02	New	0	0	0
Anti-Trident Party	187	0.01	New	0					0	New
Socialist Equality Party					139	0.01	New	0	0	New
Equal Parenting Alliance	124	0.01	New	0					0	New
Nine Per Cent Growth Party					80	0.00	New	0	0	New
Independents	25,047	1.24	–0.10	0	21,320	1.04	–0.37	1	1	–2
Total	2,016,978	100.00	–	73	2,042,804	100.00	–	56	129	0
Valid votes	2,016,978	95.93			2,042,804	97.05				
Invalid/blank votes	85,631	4.07			62,038	2.95				
Total votes	2,102,609	100.00			2,104,842	100.00				
Registered voters/turnout	3,899,472	53.92			3,899,472	53.98				
Source: Scottish Parliament

Popular Vote (Constituency)
SNP	32.93%
Labour	32.15%
Conservative	16.60%
Liberal Democrats	16.17%
Other	2.15%

Popular Vote (Regional)
SNP	31.02%
Labour	29.16%
Conservative	13.91%
Liberal Democrats	11.30%
Green	4.04%
SSCUP	1.90%
Other	8.67%

Parliament seats
SNP	36.43%
Labour	35.66%
Conservative	13.18%
Liberal Democrats	12.40%
Green	1.55%
Other	0.78%

Turnout in the election was 51.7% in the constituency vote and 52.4% in the regional vote up from 2003 where the turnout was 49.4% in both the constituency and regional vote

Notes: Independents contested 17 seats and three regions. Scottish Greens contested 1 seat, Scottish Socialist Party contested 1 seat, Scottish Christian Party, Scottish Voice etc. contested a small number of seats. A number of local issue parties also stood in single constituencies. The Nine Per Cent Growth Party stood candidates on the regional lists, and had a candidate for the local council elections of the same year. Standing in the Glasgow Regional List the party finished last of 23 candidates, receiving only 80 votes (0.04%), a record low.

=== Constituency and regional summary ===
==== Central Scotland ====
2007 Scottish Parliament election: Central Scotland
Constituency	Elected member	Result
Airdrie and Shotts	Karen Whitefield	Labour hold
Coatbridge and Chryston	Elaine Smith	Labour hold
Cumbernauld and Kilsyth	Cathie Craigie	Labour hold
East Kilbride	Andy Kerr	Labour hold
Falkirk East	Cathy Peattie	Labour hold
Falkirk West	Michael Matheson	SNP gain from Independent
Hamilton North and Bellshill	Michael McMahon	Labour hold
Hamilton South	Tom McCabe	Labour hold
Kilmarnock and Loudoun	Willie Coffey	SNP gain from Labour
Motherwell and Wishaw	Jack McConnell	Labour hold

Scottish Parliament election, 2007: Central Scotland
Party	Elected candidates	Seats	+/−	Votes	%	+/−%
SNP	Alex Neil; Linda Fabiani; Jamie Hepburn; Christina McKelvie; John Wilson	5	+2	89,210	31.4	+8.8
Conservative	Margaret Mitchell	1	±0	24,253	8.5	−0.6
Liberal Democrats	Hugh O'Donnell	1	±0	14,648	5.2	−0.7

==== Glasgow ====
2007 Scottish Parliament election: Glasgow
Constituency	Elected member	Result
Glasgow Anniesland	Bill Butler	Labour hold
Glasgow Baillieston	Margaret Curran	Labour hold
Glasgow Cathcart	Charles Gordon	Labour hold
Glasgow Govan	Nicola Sturgeon	SNP gain from Labour
Glasgow Kelvin	Pauline McNeill	Labour hold
Glasgow Maryhill	Patricia Ferguson	Labour hold
Glasgow Pollok	Johann Lamont	Labour hold
Glasgow Rutherglen	James Kelly	Labour hold
Glasgow Shettleston	Frank McAveety	Labour hold
Glasgow Springburn	Paul Martin	Labour hold

Scottish Parliament election, 2007: Glasgow
Party	Elected candidates	Seats	+/−	Votes	%	+/−%
SNP	Bashir Ahmad; Sandra White; Bob Doris; Bill Kidd	4	+2	55,832	27.0	+9.9
Liberal Democrats	Robert Brown	1	±0	14,767	7.2	−0.1
Conservative	Bill Aitken	1	±0	13,751	6.7	−0.8
Green	Patrick Harvie	1	±0	10,759	5.2	−1.9

==== Highlands and Islands ====
2007 Scottish Parliament election: Highlands and Islands
Constituency	Elected member	Result
Argyll and Bute	Jim Mather	SNP gain from Liberal Democrats
Caithness, Sutherland and Easter Ross	Jamie Stone	Liberal Democrats hold
Inverness East, Nairn and Lochaber	Fergus Ewing	SNP hold
Moray	Richard Lochhead	SNP hold
Orkney	Liam McArthur	Liberal Democrats hold
Ross, Skye and Inverness West	John Farquhar Munro	Liberal Democrats hold
Shetland	Tavish Scott	Liberal Democrats hold
Western Isles	Alasdair Allan	SNP gain from Labour

Scottish Parliament election, 2007: Highlands and Islands
Party	Elected candidates	Seats	+/−	Votes	%	+/−%
SNP	Rob Gibson; David Thompson	2	±0	63,979	34.4	+11.0
Labour	Peter Peacock; Rhoda Grant; David Stewart	3	+1	32,952	17.7	−4.6
Conservative	Mary Scanlon; Jamie McGrigor	2	±0	23,334	12.6	−3.4

==== Lothians ====
2007 Scottish Parliament election: Lothians
Constituency	Elected member	Result
Edinburgh Central	Sarah Boyack	Labour hold
Edinburgh East and Musselburgh	Kenny MacAskill	SNP gain from Labour
Edinburgh North and Leith	Malcolm Chisholm	Labour hold
Edinburgh Pentlands	David McLetchie	Conservative hold
Edinburgh South	Mike Pringle	Liberal Democrats hold
Edinburgh West	Margaret Smith	Liberal Democrats hold
Linlithgow	Mary Mulligan	Labour hold
Livingston	Angela Constance	SNP gain from Labour
Midlothian	Rhona Brankin	Labour hold

Scottish Parliament election, 2007: Lothians
Party	Elected candidates	Seats	+/−	Votes	%	+/−%
SNP	Fiona Hyslop; Ian McKee; Stefan Tymkewycz	3	+1	76,019	26.5	+10.2
Labour	George Foulkes	1	+1	75,495	26.3	+0.8
Conservative	Gavin Brown	1	±0	37,548	13.1	−2.0
Green	Robin Harper	1	−1	20,147	7.0	−5.0
Independent	Margo MacDonald	1	±0	19,256	6.7	−3.5

==== Mid Scotland and Fife ====
2007 Scottish Parliament election: Mid Scotland and Fife
Constituency	Elected member	Result
Dunfermline East	Helen Eadie	Labour hold
Dunfermline West	Jim Tolson	Liberal Democrats gain from Labour
Fife Central	Tricia Marwick	SNP gain from Labour
Fife North East	Iain Smith	Liberal Democrats hold
Kirkcaldy	Marilyn Livingstone	Labour hold
North Tayside	John Swinney	SNP hold
Ochil	Keith Brown	SNP hold
Perth	Roseanna Cunningham	SNP hold
Stirling	Bruce Crawford	SNP gain from Labour

Scottish Parliament election, 2007: Mid Scotland and Fife
Party	Elected candidates	Seats	+/−	Votes	%	+/−%
SNP	Chris Harvie	1	−1	90,090	33.0	+10.0
Labour	John Park; Claire Brennan-Baker; Richard Simpson	3	+3	71,922	26.3	+1.0
Conservative	Murdo Fraser; Liz Smith; Ted Brocklebank	3	±0	44,341	16.2	−1.3

==== North East Scotland ====
2007 Scottish Parliament election: North East Scotland
Constituency	Elected member	Result
Aberdeen Central	Lewis Macdonald	Labour hold
Aberdeen North	Brian Adam	SNP hold
Aberdeen South	Nicol Stephen	Liberal Democrats hold
Angus	Andrew Welsh	SNP hold
Banff and Buchan	Stewart Stevenson	SNP hold
Dundee East	Shona Robison	SNP hold
Dundee West	Joe Fitzpatrick	SNP gain from Labour
Gordon	Alex Salmond	SNP gain from Liberal Democrats
West Aberdeenshire and Kincardine	Mike Rumbles	Liberal Democrats hold

Scottish Parliament election, 2007: North East Scotland
Party	Elected candidates	Seats	+/−	Votes	%	+/−%
SNP	Maureen Watt; Nigel Don	2	+1	105,265	40.5	+13.2
Labour	Richard Baker; Marlyn Glen	2	±0	52,125	20.0	−0.1
Conservative	Alex Johnstone; Nanette Milne	2	−1	37,666	14.5	-2.9
Liberal Democrats	Alison McInnes	1	+1	40,934	15.7	−3.1

==== South of Scotland ====
2007 Scottish Parliament election: South of Scotland
Constituency	Elected member	Result
Ayr	John Scott	Conservative hold
Carrick, Cumnock and Doon Valley	Cathy Jamieson	Labour hold
Clydesdale	Karen Gillon	Labour hold
Cunninghame South	Irene Oldfather	Labour hold
Dumfries	Elaine Murray	Labour hold
East Lothian	Iain Gray	Labour hold
Galloway and Upper Nithsdale	Alex Fergusson	Conservative hold
Roxburgh and Berwickshire	John Lamont	Conservative gain from Liberal Democrats
Tweeddale, Ettrick and Lauderdale	Jeremy Purvis	Liberal Democrats hold

Scottish Parliament election, 2007: South of Scotland
Party	Elected candidates	Seats	+/−	Votes	%	+/−%
SNP	Christine Grahame; Michael Russell; Adam Ingram; Alasdair Morgan; Aileen Campbell	5	+2	77,053	27.8	+9.4
Conservative	Derek Brownlee	1	−1	62,475	22.6	−1.7
Liberal Democrats	Jim Hume	1	+1	28,040	10.1	−0.1

==== West of Scotland ====
2007 Scottish Parliament election: West of Scotland
Constituency	Elected member	Result
Clydebank and Milngavie	Des McNulty	Labour hold
Cunninghame North	Kenneth Gibson	SNP gain from Labour
Dumbarton	Jackie Baillie	Labour hold
Eastwood	Ken Macintosh	Labour hold
Greenock and Inverclyde	Duncan McNeil	Labour hold
Paisley North	Wendy Alexander	Labour hold
Paisley South	Hugh Henry	Labour hold
Strathkelvin and Bearsden	David Whitton	Labour gain from Independent
West Renfrewshire	Patricia Godman	Labour hold

Scottish Parliament election, 2007: West of Scotland
Party	Elected candidates	Seats	+/−	Votes	%	+/−%
SNP	Stewart Maxwell; Gil Paterson; Bill Wilson; Stuart McMillan	4	+1	75,953	28.3	+8.7
Conservative	Annabel Goldie; Jackson Carlaw	2	±0	40,637	15.2	−0.5
Liberal Democrats	Ross Finnie	1	±0	22,515	8.4	−3.9

== Incidents ==
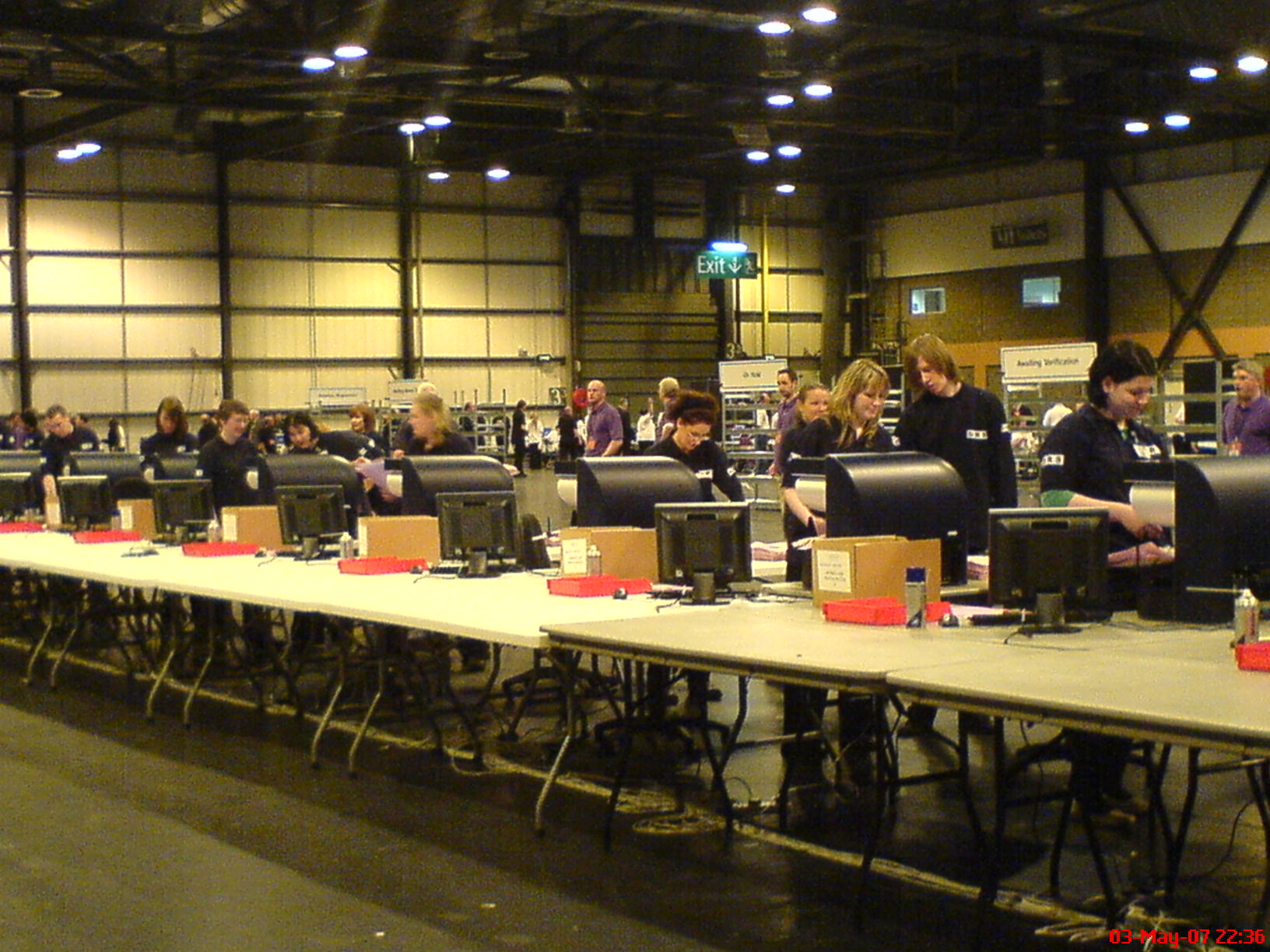
Scanners counting votes in Glasgow's SECC.

=== Delayed counts ===
Some counts in the Western Isles (Barra & the Uists) were delayed because the chartered helicopter sent to pick up the ballot boxes was delayed by bad weather. The boxes were instead transferred by sea and road to be counted in Stornoway. The votes were announced around 12.00 on Friday 4 May.

=== Vandalism ===
A man smashed ballot boxes with a golf club at a polling station at Carrick Knowe in Corstorphine in Edinburgh. About 100 ballots were damaged, some having to be taped back together. The man was arrested on the scene.

=== High number of rejected votes ===
The number of 'invalid' ballot papers (residual votes) in this election was significantly higher than usual, with a total of 146,099 ballot papers (regional: 60,455 or 2.88%; constituency: 85,644 or 4.075%) being rejected, with some constituencies such as Glasgow Shettleston having rejection rates as high as 12.1%. For comparison, the rejected ballot paper rate in 2003 was 0.65% for regional ballot papers and 0.66% for constituency ballot papers. In total there were 16 constituencies where the number of rejected ballot papers exceeded the winning candidate's majority. This led to calls for an independent enquiry into the implementation of the new voting system. The BBC Scotland Chief Political Editor, Brian Taylor, described the situation as "a disgrace" during their Election Night coverage.

There are several reasons for the unusually high levels of rejected ballot papers in the election. One primary reason is that both the regional and constituency choices were placed on a single sheet of paper. A large-type instruction at the top indicated "you have two votes." Being told that they had two votes, far too many voters used both votes on parties in the regional list. Although a rough template of the ballot was provided to voters by VoteScotland prior to the election, many ballot papers in reality had subtle yet consequential differences. Taking the ballot from Glasgow Shettleston for example, although its layout is similar to the sample ballot it has many more parties on the regional ballot, giving the illusion that the list continues onto the next side (constituency ballot). Furthermore, instructions provided to voters using these sheets were abbreviated. While the brief written instructions remained, they were presented in a much smaller font size. The column headings moved above the bold lines defining the columns and the visual prompt of the split arrow leading to the two columns is completely missing. This misleading ballot was made more complicated by two additional features of the balloting: several small parties like the Green Party ran one or fewer candidates in the constituency seats and parties were able to choose to put the name of their leader instead of the name of the party in the label for the list seats (For example, the SNP was listed as "Alex Salmond for First Minister", rather than the party name).

Another reason presented was that local elections took place on the same day with a different voting system and different design. Whereas the parliamentary election asked voters to mark a cross, the local council elections asked voters to number/ rank their candidates, as the council elections were under the single transferable vote system. Undercutting this theory, however, was that the invalid rate in the local elections was far lower than the parliamentary elections (although still greater than in previous local elections) despite single transferable vote being a new system for most voters.

A third proposed reason was that this was the first election where electronic counting of papers had taken place. Many blamed e-counting for the increase in rejected papers, in part because the new machine counting system abandoned many counts during the early hours of Friday morning before all results had been counted. Furthermore, the primary reason for the regional and constituency ballot papers being placed on the same sheet of paper is due to restrictions on the size of paper the machines could accurately scan. The main company concerned was DRS Ltd. Nevertheless, nearly all invalid ballot papers would have been spoiled no matter how they were counted. However, the last minute redesign of ballot papers that was blamed for the high number of rejections in two electoral regions was done to make electronic voting easier.

==== Threatened legal actions ====
On 5 May 2007, the BBC reported that Labour were considering legal action against some results (particularly Cunninghame North, where the SNP beat Labour by just 48 votes) due to the high number of rejected votes. A further challenge was expected from Mike Dailly from the Govan Law Centre, a member of the Labour Party, purportedly on behalf of voters in the Glasgow region. He said that the result should be challenged because there were over 10,000 rejected ballot papers which could have caused a different result if they had counted. Tommy Sheridan of Solidarity was only 2,215 votes short of beating the Greens for the last place as an MSP.

There were no election petitions raised to challenge the results.

== Election system ==
There are 73 constituencies, each electing one Member of the Scottish Parliament (MSP) by the plurality (first past the post) system of election, which are grouped into eight regions. These regions each elect seven additional member MSPs so as to produce an overall proportional result. The D'Hondt method is used to calculate which additional member MSPs the regions elect. Each constituency is a sub-division of a region; the additional members system is designed to produce proportional representation for each region, and the total number of MSPs elected to the parliament is 129.

The election was the first using constituencies (see Scottish Parliament constituencies and regions) that are not identical to constituencies of the House of Commons (Parliament of the United Kingdom). Scottish Westminster constituencies were replaced with a new set of generally larger constituencies, fewer in number, in 2005.

The Arbuthnott Commission reported in January 2006, concerning the multiplicity of voting systems and electoral divisions in Scotland. Council elections on the same day used Single Transferable Vote for the first time, but there was no change to the Holyrood election system, except regarding use of vote-counting machines, before the 2007 election. Scanners supplied by DRS Data Services Limited of Milton Keynes, in partnership with Electoral Reform Services, the trading arm of the Electoral Reform Society, were used to electronically count the paper ballots in both the Scottish Parliament general election and the Scottish council elections, which took place on the same day.

== Top target seats of the main parties ==
Below are listed all the constituencies which required a swing of less than 5% from the 2003 result to change hands.

Many of the seats that changed hands are not listed here. For example, the Scottish National Party gained several seats (Stirling, Edinburgh East & Musselburgh, Gordon, Livingston and Argyll & Bute) with very large swings, yet did not gain any of their top three targets.

=== Labour targets ===
Rank	Constituency	Winning party 2003	Swing to gain	Labour's place 2003	Result
1	Dundee East	SNP	0.17	2nd	SNP hold
2	Edinburgh South	Liberal Democrats	0.26	2nd	LD hold
3	Ochil	SNP	0.49	2nd	SNP hold
4	Strathkelvin and Bearsden	Independent	0.62	2nd	Lab gain
5	Aberdeen North	SNP	0.92	2nd	SNP hold
6	Inverness East, Nairn and Lochaber	SNP	1.51	2nd	SNP hold
7	Tweeddale, Ettrick and Lauderdale	Liberal Democrats	2.70	3rd	LD hold
8	Ayr	Conservative	2.99	2nd	Con hold
9	Edinburgh Pentlands	Conservative	3.16	2nd	Con hold
10	Caithness, Sutherland and Easter Ross	Liberal Democrats	4.96	2nd	LD hold

=== SNP targets ===
Rank	Constituency	Winning party 2003	Swing to gain	SNP's place 2003	Result
1	Galloway & Upper Nithsdale	Conservative	0.17	2nd	Con hold
2	Tweeddale, Ettrick & Lauderdale	Liberal Democrats	1.01	2nd	LD hold
3	Cumbernauld & Kilsyth	Labour	1.07	2nd	Lab hold
4	Kilmarnock & Loudoun	Labour	1.92	2nd	SNP gain
5	Dundee West	Labour	2.13	2nd	SNP gain
6	Western Isles	Labour	2.91	2nd	SNP gain
7	Glasgow Govan	Labour	2.92	2nd	SNP gain
8	Aberdeen Central	Labour	2.96	2nd	Lab hold
9	Linlithgow	Labour	3.56	2nd	Lab hold
10	West Renfrewshire	Labour	4.41	2nd	Lab hold
11	Paisley South	Labour	4.91	2nd	Lab hold

=== Conservative targets ===
Rank	Constituency	Winning party 2003	Swing to gain	Con place 2003	Result
1	Perth	SNP	1.15	2nd	SNP hold
2	Dumfries	Labour	1.71	2nd	Lab hold
3	Tweeddale, Ettrick & Lauderdale	Liberal Democrats	2.83	4th	LD hold
4	Eastwood	Labour	4.76	2nd	Lab hold
5	Stirling	Labour	4.86	2nd	SNP gain
6	West Renfrewshire	Labour	4.96	3rd	Lab hold

=== Liberal Democrat targets ===
Rank	Constituency	Winning party 2003	Swing to gain	LD's place 2003	Result
1	Edinburgh Central	Labour	4.75	2nd	Lab hold
2	Aberdeen Central	Labour	4.99	3rd	Lab hold

== Election of First Minister ==
The Scottish Parliament officially met on 9 May, and met again on 14 May to elect a Presiding Officer. On 16 May, the Parliament met to hold the election of the First Minister. Four nominations were made: Annabel Goldie of the Conservatives, Jack McConnell of Labour, Nicol Stephen of the Liberal Democrats, and Alex Salmond of the Scottish National Party.

Salmond was elected in the second round of voting by 49 votes to McConnell's 46. 33 abstentions were recorded. The election provided for a minority administration which did not have the explicit support of Parliament. Salmond was supported in the election by the two Green MSPs. Otherwise, voting was conducted strictly along party lines.

Election of Scottish First Minister, 16 May 2007
Candidate	Party	1st Round		2nd Round		Result
Candidate	Party	Votes	%	Votes	%	Result
Alex Salmond	SNP	49	38.6	49	51.6	Elected
Jack McConnell	Labour	46	36.2	46	48.4	Not Elected
Annabel Goldie	Conservative	16	12.6			Eliminated after 1st Round
Nicol Stephen	Liberal Democrats	16	12.6			Eliminated after 1st Round
Total Voting		127		95		
Abstentions		1		33		

== Party leaders ==
=== Major parties ===
At time of dissolution of the Scottish Parliament at midnight on Monday 2 April 2007, there were five party 'groups' represented on the Parliament's Bureau: Labour (50), SNP (25), Conservative (17), LibDem (17), and the Greens (7). There was also one 'mixed' administrative grouping of 5 independent MSPs and 1 Scottish Senior Citizens Unity Party MSP.

2007 Scottish Parliament Election – Party Leaders
Scottish National Party		Labour Party		Conservative Party		Liberal Democrats
Alex Salmond; Leader of the Scottish National Party		Jack McConnell; Leader of the Scottish Labour Party		Annabel Goldie; Leader of the Scottish; Conservative and Unionist Party		Nicol Stephen; Leader of the Scottish Liberal Democrats
Age	52	Age	46	Age	57	Age	47
Parliament	Scottish Parliament – 2 years (1999–2001) & UK Parliament – 19 years (1987–6 May 2010)	Parliament	7 years	Parliament	7 years	Parliament	Scottish Parliament – 7 years & UK Parliament – 5 months (1991–1992)
Leader since	1990–2000 & 2004	Leader since	2001	Leader since	2005	Leader since	2005
Profession	Economist	Profession	Teacher	Profession	Solicitor	Profession	Solicitor

Of the major party leaders in the Scottish Parliament, only one, Jack McConnell, of the Scottish Labour Party fought the 2003 Scottish Parliamentary election as leader. Nicol Stephen succeeded Jim Wallace as Deputy First Minister and Leader of the Scottish Liberal Democrats in June 2005, after the latter announced that he would not be contesting the 2007 election. Alex Salmond was elected leader of the Scottish National Party in 2004, with his deputy Nicola Sturgeon. Salmond previously led the SNP between 1990 and 2000, but stood down and was replaced by his preferred successor John Swinney, who headed the party between 2000 and 2004. Following Swinney's resignation in 2004, Salmond announced that he would, once again contest the leadership and won the ballot of members in June 2004. Annabel Goldie was elected leader of the Scottish Conservatives in November 2005 after the resignation of the incumbent David McLetchie on 31 October 2005 after a row surrounding taxi expenses.

=== Other parties ===
Robin Harper and Shiona Baird were elected as Greens Co-convenors in 2004, but as the sole Green MSP Harper was effectively party spokesperson from 1999.

Colin Fox was elected as the Scottish Socialist Party Convenor in 2005. In 2006 Tommy Sheridan left the party to form Solidarity.

== Aftermath ==
This was Scottish Labour's first defeat since the 1979 European Parliament election, which was won by the Conservatives. In his memoir, A Journey (2010), Tony Blair claimed responsibility for the SNP's victory, stating that he believed his leadership had cost Labour votes and that things could have been different had his successor Gordon Brown been in office at the time.

This election was a realigning election as the Scottish National Party would win the plurarity of the votes and seats in every Scottish Parliament election since 2007.

== See also ==
- Members of the 3rd Scottish Parliament
- Elections in Scotland
- National Assembly for Wales election and 2007 United Kingdom local elections, which took place on the same day
