= Alison Harris =

Scottish politician (born 1965)

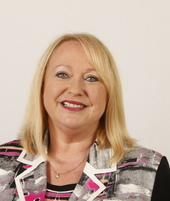
- Harris in 2016

Member of the Scottish Parliament for Central Scotland (1 of 7 Regional MSPs)
- In office 5 May 2016 – 5 May 2021
- Preceded by: John Wilson

Personal details
- Born: 23 July 1965 (age 60)
- Party: Scottish Conservatives
- Profession: Chartered accountant

Alison Ada Harris (born 23 July 1965) is a Scottish Conservative Party politician, who served as a Member of the Scottish Parliament (MSP) for Central Scotland from 2016 to 2021.

== Political career ==
=== Westminster elections ===
Harris stood unsuccessfully in the 2015 United Kingdom general election for the Westminster constituency of Falkirk. She came third out of the five candidates with 7,325 votes increasing the vote share to 12.13%

=== Scottish Parliament ===
For the 2016 Scottish Parliament election, Harris was selected to contest the Falkirk West constituency and was placed third on the Conservatives' Central region list, behind Margaret Mitchell MSP and Graham Simpson MSP. Margaret Mitchell was re-elected and both Simpson and Harris were elected to the Scottish Parliament for the first time on the Central region list.

Harris was the Scottish Conservative spokesperson for taxation and financial sustainability. She was deputy convener of the Public Audit Committee.
