= Donald Gorrie =

Scottish politician (1933–2012)

- Official portrait, 2003

Member of the Scottish Parliament for Central Scotland (1 of 7 Regional MSPs)
- In office 6 May 1999 – 2 April 2007
- Preceded by: New Parliament
- Succeeded by: Hugh O'Donnell

Member of Parliament for Edinburgh West
- In office 1 May 1997 – 14 May 2001
- Preceded by: Lord James Douglas-Hamilton
- Succeeded by: John Barrett

Personal details
- Born: Donald Cameron Easterbrook Gorrie; 2 April 1933 British India
- Died: 25 August 2012 (aged 79) Edinburgh, Scotland
- Party: Scottish Liberal Democrats (1988-2012)
- Other political affiliations: Scottish Liberal Party (before 1988)
- Spouse: Astrid Gorrie

Donald Cameron Easterbrook Gorrie OBE (2 April 1933 – 25 August 2012) was a Scottish Liberal Democrat politician. He was a Member of the Scottish Parliament (MSP) for the Central Scotland region from 1999 to 2007, and sat in the British House of Commons as the Member of Parliament (MP) for Edinburgh West from 1997 to 2001.

== Early and personal life ==
Gorrie was educated at the independent Oundle School and Corpus Christi College, Oxford, where he read classics and modern history. A former athlete, he held the Scottish record for the 880 yards in his youth. He won the 880 yards and mile run at the 1957 Canadian Track and Field Championships. He was married to Astrid and had two sons and a number of grandchildren.

His son Robert Gorrie was a Liberal Democrat councillor in Haringey, London, 2006–2014 and was Leader of the Opposition 2008–2011. He also stood for the Scottish Parliament seat of Airdrie and Shotts in the 2007 Scottish Parliament election.

== Early career ==
After starting his professional career as a schoolteacher, he was Secretary of the Scottish Liberal Party, before becoming an Edinburgh City councillor in 1971. He remained a member of Edinburgh Council until its dissolution in 1976, when he became a member of Lothian Regional Council 1976–96, Edinburgh District Council 1978–96 and the new Edinburgh City Council 1995–97. During this time he stood for election to Westminster in the Edinburgh West constituency four times before finally winning it and becoming the area's MP in 1997.

== Scottish Parliament ==
Gorrie's "lifelong passion" in politics was to see the establishment of a Scottish Parliament, and to sit as a Member of it. So when the Scottish Parliament was established by the referendum of 1997, he announced he would retire from the House of Commons after just one term as an MP to stand for the new Scottish Parliament. He was duly elected in 1999 as Liberal Democrat MSP for the Central Scotland region, and thus retired from Westminster at the following general election in 2001.

== Opponents ==
A feisty and independent-minded politician, he was always fiercely loyal to his liberal instincts, and had a particular mistrust of the Labour Party, which he saw as centralist and corrupt. He was firmly on the radical left of the Liberal Democrats, believing in full-scale political reform and significant increases in spending on public services. This put him at odds with the more centrist party leadership at the time, and he was often seen as a renegade member of the 'awkward squad,' for example in his implacable opposition to the coalition with the Labour Party formed after the 1999 elections (he was one of only three of his party's MSPs to vote against it).

Gorrie disliked his characterisation as a rebel, pointing to the fact that (unlike the pro-coalition MSPs) he was merely sticking to the Liberal Democrats' manifesto commitments.

== Second term ==
As time passed, and particularly after he was re-elected for a second term as MSP in 2003, he mellowed, however, and–confined to the backbenches with no hope of ministerial appointment–he concentrated on campaigning on a number of particular themes which interested him. His boldness and eye for publicity endeared him to a media corps that was often starved of stories by the cautious and tightly-controlled party machines that operated at Holyrood, and he became associated with a number of individual causes, like the spiralling cost and mismanagement of the Holyrood building project, and later his campaign against the sectarianism that plagued Scottish society. Though controversial at first, this latter campaign raised the profile of the issue until eventually it was taken up by First Minister Jack McConnell, who instigated a series of legislative attempts to deal with the issue.

Disliked by some (mainly those in what he would term 'the establishment') for the uncompromising stances he has taken, Gorrie was nevertheless said to be widely respected for his consistency of principle and his long record of service to liberal politics and public life in general. He retired from the Scottish Parliament at the 2007 elections. He upset the Liberal Democrat leadership during that campaign by saying that the party should 'never say never' to an independence referendum, as that would consign them to another coalition with the Labour Party.

Parliament of the United Kingdom
Preceded by Lord James Douglas-Hamilton	Member of Parliament for Edinburgh West; 1997 – 2001	Succeeded by John Barrett
