= Graham Simpson (politician) =

Scottish Reform politician

Graham Simpson MSP
- Official portrait, 2026

Member of the Scottish Parliament for Central Scotland and Lothians West (1 of 7 Regional MSPs)
- Incumbent
- Assumed office 7 May 2026

Member of the Scottish Parliament for Central Scotland (1 of 7 Regional MSPs)
- In office 5 May 2016 – 9 April 2026

Scottish Conservative portfolios
- Feb–Aug 2020: Shadow Cabinet Secretary for Housing, Communities and Social Security
- 2020–2021: Shadow Cabinet Secretary for Transport, Infrastructure and Connectivity

Personal details
- Born: Aberdeen, Scotland
- Party: Reform UK (since 2025)
- Other political affiliations: Scottish Conservatives (until 2025)
- Occupation: Politician; journalist
- Website: Official website

Graham Simpson is a British politician and former journalist who has been a Member of the Scottish Parliament (MSP) for the Central Scotland region since 2016. A former member of the Scottish Conservatives, he served as Shadow Cabinet Secretary for Transport, Infrastructure and Connectivity from 2020 to 2021. He defected to Reform UK in August 2025.

He was a councillor in South Lanarkshire Council between 2007 and 2017. Within Parliament, Simpson has served as the Conservative Party Shadow Cabinet Secretary for Housing, Communities and Social Security and sits on the Local Government and Communities Committee. He is also the Deputy Convenor of the cross party group on Cycling, Walking and Buses, Deputy Convenor of the cross party groups on Life Sciences and Architecture and the Built Environment as well as a member of the Beer & Pubs and Housing cross party groups.

== Early life and career ==
Simpson was born in Aberdeen before later moving to East Kilbride. He worked as a journalist for 26 years at News Corporation, rising to the position of deputy chief sub-editor of The Scottish Sun between 1983 and 2016. Simpson also worked briefly at the Daily Record.

== Political career ==
=== Westminster candidacies ===
Simpson was the Conservative parliamentary candidate for the East Kilbride, Strathaven and Lesmahagow constituency at the 2010 general election, finishing third of six candidates with 6,613 votes (13%). He stood again at the 2015 general election, again finishing third of six, increasing his number of votes to 7,129 but seeing his share of the vote drop to 11.8%.

=== Scottish Parliament ===
For the 2016 Scottish Parliament election, Simpson was selected in to contest the East Kilbride constituency and was placed second on the Conservatives' Central Scotland regional list, behind Margaret Mitchell and ahead of Alison Harris. Simpson took 16.9% of the vote in East Kilbride, placing him third. On the Central Scotland list, Margaret Mitchell was re-elected, and both Simpson and Harris were elected to the Scottish Parliament for the first time.

In the 2016–21 Scottish Parliament, Simpson was Scottish Conservative spokesperson for Housing and Communities.

In September 2017, Simpson said there were "no-go areas" in some parts of Scotland's major cities. The SNP said his comments echoed those of Donald Trump, who was widely criticised after saying police were frightened to enter some parts of London and Paris.

At the 2021 Scottish Parliament election, Simpson stood again in East Kilbride, taking 5,923 votes (14.5%), down 2.4%. The Conservatives retained all three of their list seats in Central Scotland, with Simpson being placed second on the party list.

On 27 August 2025, Simpson defected to Reform UK. He told journalists that he did not expect to become Reform's leader in Scotland. "I'm not coming here today as somebody who's been parachuted in to be the Reform leader, that would be entirely wrong, it would be wrong for the members of Reform. I'm just here as I am, as an MSP."

For the 2026 Scottish Parliament election, Simpson contested the Airdrie constituency, placing third behind the SNP and Labour. Scottish Labour leader Anas Sarwar claimed that Simpson had called his party leader Malcolm Offord "useless" and fellow Reform UK candidate Thomas Kerr a "weasel". Simpson denied the claim, and insisted he had called Kerr a "lion".

== Personal life ==
Simpson has lived in East Kilbride for 30 years. He is married and has two daughters.
