= Airdrie and Shotts =

Airdrie and Shotts may refer to:

- Airdrie and Shotts (UK Parliament constituency)
- Airdrie and Shotts (Scottish Parliament constituency)
