= Cumbernauld and Kilsyth (Scottish Parliament constituency) =

Region or constituency of the Scottish Parliament

- Burgh constituency for the Scottish Parliament
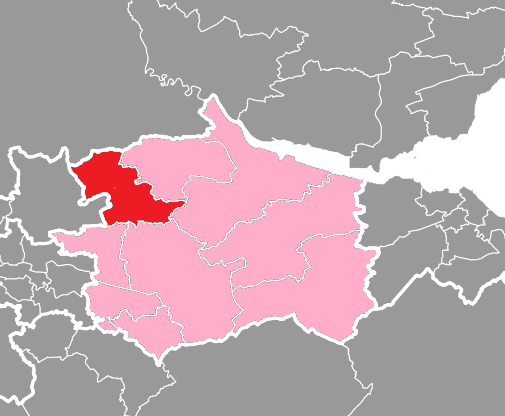

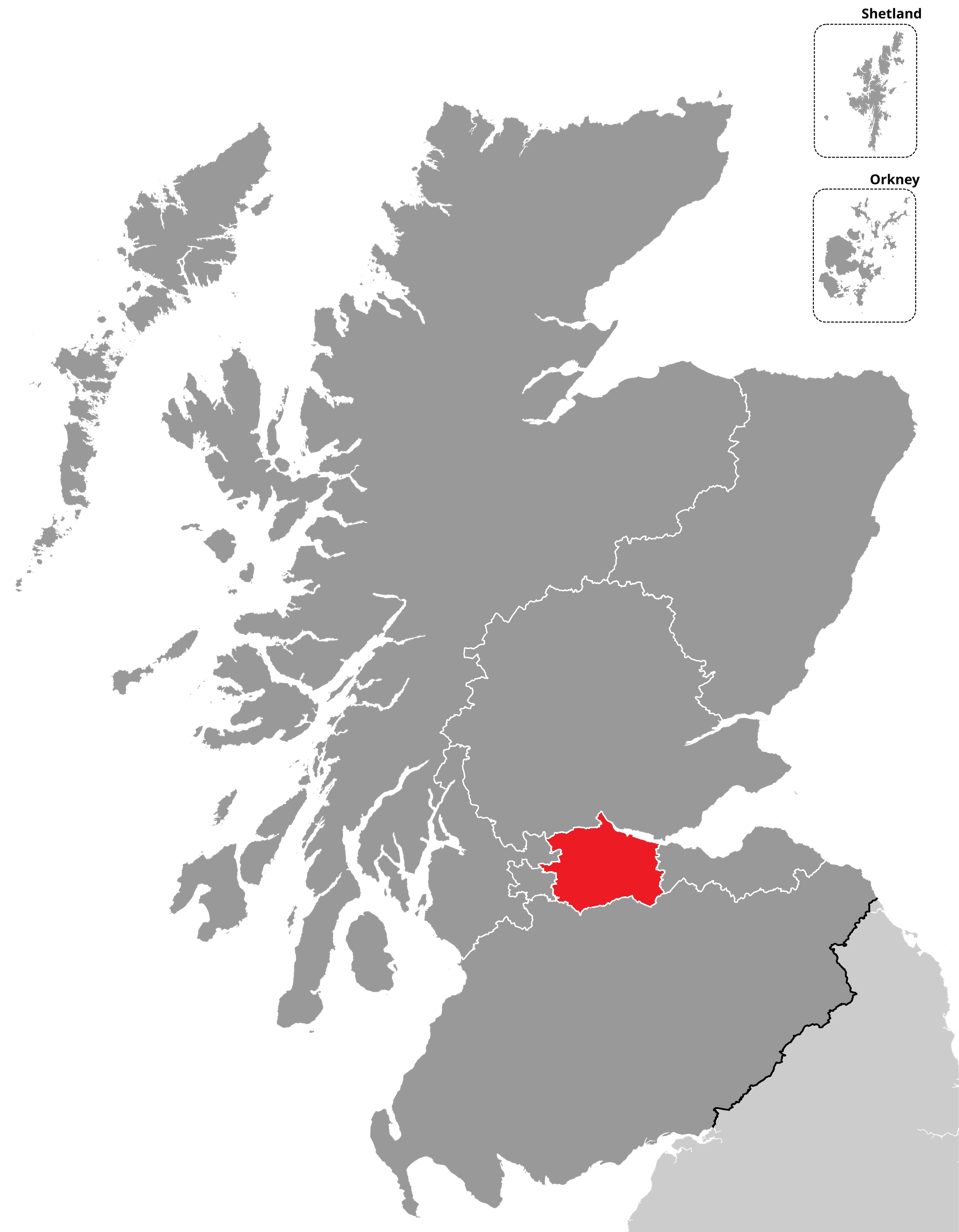
- Cumbernauld and Kilsyth shown within the Central Scotland and Lothians West electoral region, and the region shown within Scotland
- Electoral region: Central Scotland and Lothians West
- Electorate: 50,828 (2026)

Current constituency
- Created: 2011
- Party: Scottish National Party
- MSP: Jamie Hepburn
- Council area: North Lanarkshire

Cumbernauld and Kilsyth (Gaelic: Comar nan Allt agus Cill Saidh) is a burgh constituency of the Scottish Parliament covering part of the council area of North Lanarkshire. It elects one Member of the Scottish Parliament (MSP) by the plurality (first past the post) method of election. Under the additional-member electoral system used for elections to the Scottish Parliament, it is also one of nine constituencies in the Central Scotland and Lothians West electoral region, which elects seven additional members, in addition to nine constituency MSPs, to produce a form of proportional representation for the region as a whole.

The seat has been held by Jamie Hepburn of the Scottish National Party since the 2011 Scottish Parliament election.

== Electoral region ==
The other eight constituencies of the Central Scotland and Lothians West region are Airdrie, Almond Valley, Bathgate, Coatbridge and Chryston, Falkirk East and Linlithgow, Falkirk West, Motherwell and Wishaw, and Uddingston and Bellshill. The region covers all of the Falkirk, North Lanarkshire and West Lothian council areas, and part of the South Lanarkshire council area.

Prior to 2026, Cumbernauld and Kilsyth formed part of the Central Scotland Scottish Parliament region. The other eight constituencies of this region were: Airdrie and Shotts, Coatbridge and Chryston, East Kilbride, Falkirk East, Falkirk West, Hamilton, Larkhall and Stonehouse, Motherwell and Wishaw and Uddingston and Bellshill. The region covered all of the Falkirk council area, all of the North Lanarkshire council area and part of the South Lanarkshire council area.

== Constituency boundaries and council area ==
Map of boundaries from 2005

The constituency was created at the same time as the Scottish Parliament, for the 1999 Scottish Parliament election, using the name and boundaries of the existing Cumbernauld and Kilsyth constituency of the UK Parliament. Ahead of the 2005 United Kingdom general election, Scottish constituencies for the UK Parliament were mostly replaced with new constituencies, whilst initially being retained for election to the Scottish Parliament. Scottish Parliament constituencies were themselves reviewed ahead of the 2011 Scottish Parliament election, however Cumbernauld and Kilsyth was left, being the only mainland seat to remain unchanged during this review. The seat also remained unchanged following the second periodic review of Scottish Parliament boundaries.

Cumbernauld and Kilsyth is one of four covering the North Lanarkshire council area, the others being Airdrie, Coatbridge and Chryston, and Motherwell and Wishaw; Uddingston and Bellshill spans parts of both North and South Lanarkshire. All five are within the Central Scotland electoral region.

Following the first Scottish Parliamentary Boundary Review the electoral wards forming Cumbernauld and Kilsyth were:

- In full: Cumbernauld East, Cumbernauld North, Cumbernauld South, Kilsyth

When redrawn following the second review of Scottish Parliament boundaries, the same electoral wards were used to redefine the seat.

== Member of the Scottish Parliament ==
Election	Member	Party
1999	Cathie Craigie	Labour
2011	Jamie Hepburn	SNP

== Election results ==
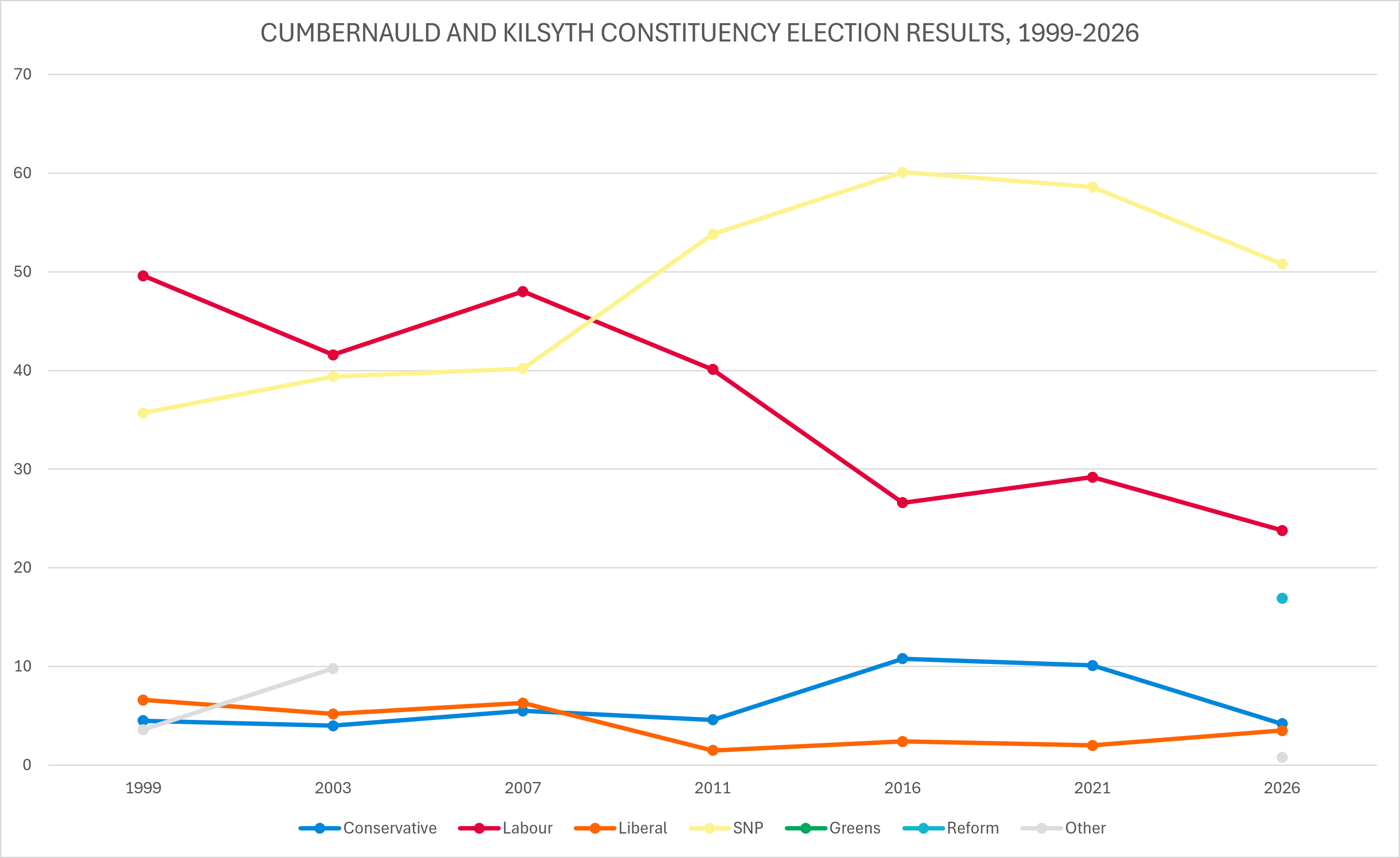
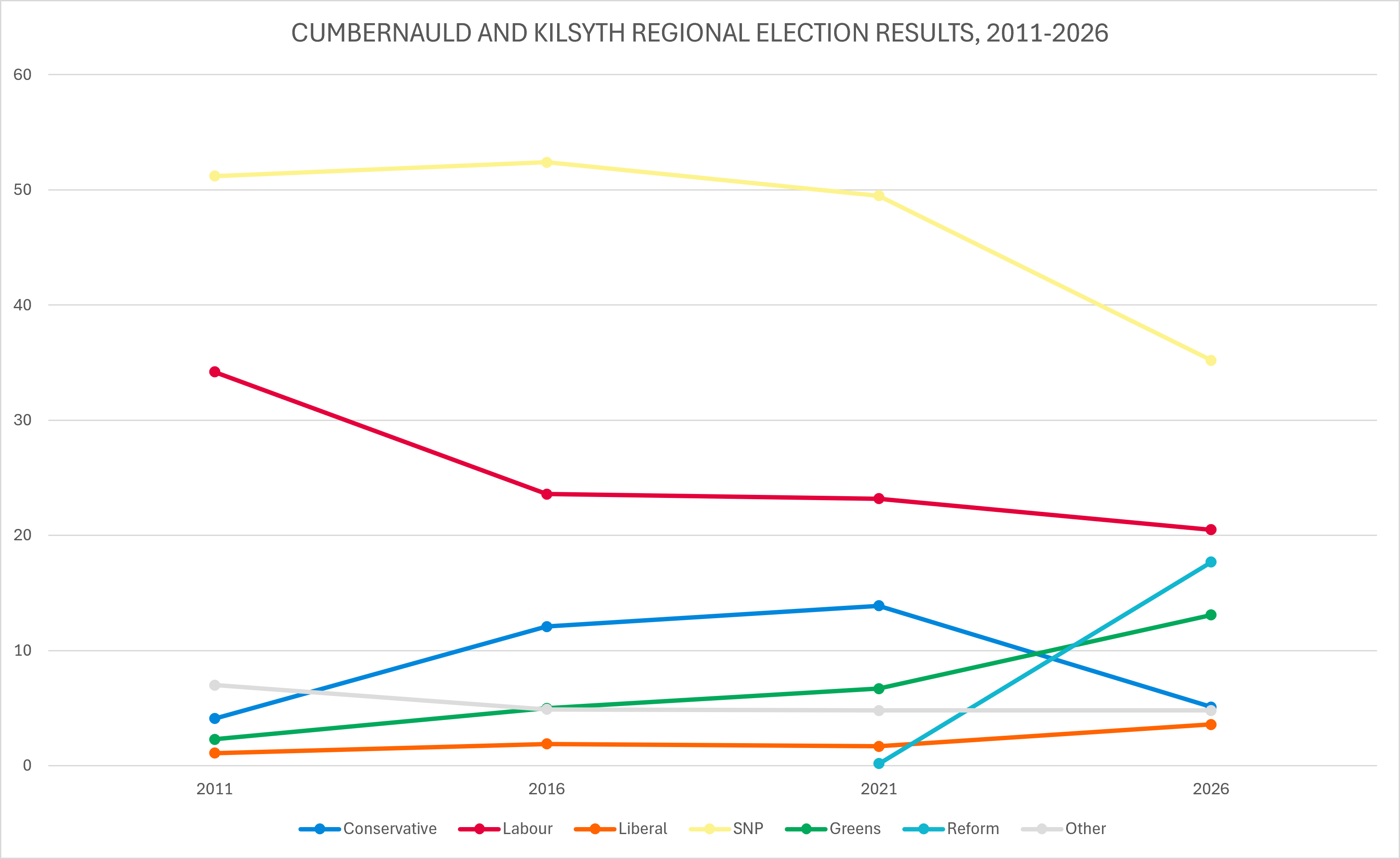

=== 2020s ===
2026 Scottish Parliament election: Cumbernauld and Kilsyth
Party	Candidate	Constituency			Regional		
Party	Candidate	Votes	%	±%	Votes	%	±%
SNP	Jamie Hepburn (Note: Incumbent member for this constituency)	13,787	50.8	▼7.8	9,574	35.2	▼14.2
Labour	James McPhilemy	6,472	23.8	▼5.4	5,575	20.5	▼2.7
Reform	Steve Grant	4,580	16.9	New	4,798	17.7	▲17.5
Green					3,562	13.1	▲6.4
Conservative	Keith Allan	1,129	4.2	▼5.9	1,393	5.1	▼8.8
Liberal Democrats	William Howieson	949	3.5	▲1.5	984	3.6	▲1.9
Scottish Family					299	1.1	▲0.3
Sovereignty	Alan McManus (Note: Also standing as part of the Alliance to Liberate Scotland - regional list votes given are for the latter party's list.)	226	0.8	New	281	1.0	New
Independent Green Voice					259	1.0	▲0.4
ISP					159	0.6	New
Scottish Socialist					112	0.4	New
Abolish the Scottish Parliament					64	0.2	Steady
Workers Party					44	0.2	New
Advance UK					34	0.1	New
Scottish Libertarian					20	0.1	▼0.1
UKIP					18	0.1	Steady
Majority		7,315	26.9	▼2.4			
Valid votes		27,143			27,176		
Invalid votes		106			81		
Turnout		27,249	53.6	▼11.7	27,257	53.6	▼11.7
SNP hold		Swing		▼1.2			
Notes

2021 Scottish Parliament election: Cumbernauld and Kilsyth
Party	Candidate	Constituency			Regional		
Party	Candidate	Votes	%	±%	Votes	%	±%
SNP	Jamie Hepburn (Note: Incumbent member for this constituency)	19,633	58.6	▼1.5	16,592	49.5	▼2.9
Labour	Mark Griffin (Note: Incumbent member on the party list, or for another constituency)	9,792	29.2	▲2.6	7,787	23.2	▼0.4
Conservative	Haroun Malik	3,375	10.1	▼0.7	4,679	13.9	▲1.8
Green					2,260	6.7	▲1.7
Liberal Democrats	Elaine Ford	678	2.0	▼0.4	575	1.7	▼0.2
Alba					568	1.7	New
All for Unity					258	0.8	New
Scottish Family					257	0.8	New
Independent Green Voice					198	0.6	New
Independent	Paddy Hogg				86	0.3	New
Freedom Alliance (UK)					78	0.2	New
Abolish the Scottish Parliament					68	0.2	New
Reform					54	0.2	New
Scottish Libertarian					48	0.1	New
UKIP					38	0.1	▼1.9
Majority		9,841	29.4	▼4.1			
Valid votes		33,478			33,546		
Invalid votes		115			52		
Turnout		33,593	65.3	▲8.5	33,598	65.3	▲8.4
SNP hold		Swing					

=== 2010s ===
2016 Scottish Parliament election: Cumbernauld and Kilsyth
Party	Candidate	Constituency			Regional		
Party	Candidate	Votes	%	±%	Votes	%	±%
SNP	Jamie Hepburn	17,015	60.1	▲6.3	14,863	52.4	▲1.2
Labour	Mark Griffin	7,537	26.6	▼13.5	6,683	23.6	▼10.6
Conservative	Anthony Newman	3,068	10.8	▲6.2	3,441	12.1	▲8.0
Green					1,431	5.0	▲2.7
UKIP					579	2.0	▲1.7
Liberal Democrats	Irene Lang	688	2.4	▲0.9	541	1.9	▲0.8
RISE					265	0.9	New
Solidarity					263	0.9	▲0.7
Scottish Christian					255	0.9	▼0.5
Independent	Deryck Beaumont				51	0.2	New
Majority		9,478	33.5	▲19.8			
Valid votes		28,308			28,372		
Invalid votes		93			58		
Turnout		28,401	56.8	▲4.1	28,430	56.9	▲4.5
SNP hold		Swing		▲9.9			
Notes

2011 Scottish Parliament election: Cumbernauld and Kilsyth
Party	Candidate	Constituency			Regional		
Party	Candidate	Votes	%	±%	Votes	%	±%
SNP	Jamie Hepburn	13,595	53.8	▲13.6	12,873	51.2	
Labour	Cathie Craigie	10,136	40.1	▼7.9	8,607	34.2	
Conservative	James Boswell	1,156	4.6	▼0.9	1,021	4.1	
All-Scotland Pensioners Party					577	2.3	
Green					577	2.3	
Scottish Christian					363	1.4	
Liberal Democrats	Martin Oliver	367	1.5	▼4.8	270	1.1	
BNP					207	0.8	
Independent	Hugh O'Donnell				156	0.6	
Socialist Labour					101	0.4	
Scottish Socialist					97	0.4	
UKIP					85	0.3	
Solidarity					42	0.2	
Others					160	0.6	
Majority		3,459	13.7				
Valid votes		25,254			25,136		
Invalid votes		69			55		
Turnout		25,323	52.7	▼0.9	25,191	52.5	
SNP gain from Labour		Swing		▲10.8			

=== 2000s ===
2007 Scottish Parliament election: Cumbernauld and Kilsyth
Party	Candidate	Votes	%	±%
Labour	Cathie Craigie	12,672	48.0	+6.4
SNP	Jamie Hepburn	10,593	40.2	+0.8
Liberal Democrats	Hugh O'Donnell	1,670	6.3	+1.1
Conservative	Anne Harding	1,447	5.5	+1.5
Majority		2,079	7.8	+5.6
Rejected ballots		803	3.0	
Turnout		26,382	53.6	+3.5
Labour hold		Swing	-2.8	

2003 Scottish Parliament election: Cumbernauld and Kilsyth
Party	Candidate	Votes	%	±%
Labour	Cathie Craigie	10,146	41.6	−8.0
SNP	Andrew Wilson	9,626	39.4	+3.7
Scottish Socialist	Kenny McEwan	1,823	7.5	+3.9
Liberal Democrats	Hugh O'Donnell	1,264	5.2	−1.4
Conservative	Margaret McCulloch	978	4.0	−0.5
Independent	Christopher Donohue	567	2.3	New
Majority		520	2.2	−11.7
Turnout		24,404	50.1	−11.9
Labour hold		Swing		

=== 1990s ===
1999 Scottish Parliament election: Cumbernauld and Kilsyth
Party	Candidate	Votes	%	±%
Labour	Cathie Craigie	15,182	49.6	N/A
SNP	Andrew Wilson	10,923	35.7	N/A
Liberal Democrats	Hugh O'Donnell	2,029	6.6	N/A
Conservative	Robin Slack	1,362	4.5	N/A
Scottish Socialist	Kenny McEwan	1,116	3.6	N/A
Majority		4,259	13.9	N/A
Turnout		30,612	62.0	N/A
Labour win (new seat)				

== Footnotes ==
=== Bibliography ===
- "Second Review of Scottish Parliament Boundaries: Report to Scottish Ministers" (PDF). Boundaries Scotland. April 2025.

== See also ==
Cumbernauld and Kilsyth (UK Parliament constituency)
