= Alex Neil (politician) =

Scottish politician (born 1951)

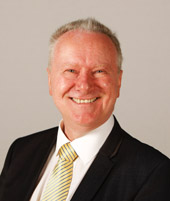

Cabinet Secretary for Social Justice, Communities and Pensioners' Rights
- In office 21 November 2014 – 18 May 2016
- First Minister: Nicola Sturgeon
- Preceded by: Shona Robison
- Succeeded by: Angela Constance

Cabinet Secretary for Health and Wellbeing
- In office 5 September 2012 – 21 November 2014
- First Minister: Alex Salmond
- Preceded by: Nicola Sturgeon
- Succeeded by: Shona Robison

Member of the Scottish Parliament for Airdrie and Shotts
- In office 5 May 2011 – 5 May 2021
- Preceded by: Karen Whitefield
- Succeeded by: Neil Gray

Member of the Scottish Parliament for Central Scotland (1 of 7 Regional MSPs)
- In office 6 May 1999 – 22 March 2011

Personal details
- Born: 22 August 1951 (age 75) Irvine, Ayrshire, Scotland
- Party: Labour (1967–76); SLP (1976–81); SNP (1985–present)
- Spouse: Isabella Kerr
- Children: 1
- Education: University of Dundee
- Occupation: Political researcher; Businessman; Economic consultant

Alexander Neil (born 22 August 1951) is a Scottish politician who served as Cabinet Secretary for Health and Wellbeing from 2012 to 2014 and Cabinet Secretary for Social Justice, Communities and Pensioners' Rights from 2014 to 2016. A member of the Scottish National Party (SNP), he was the Member of the Scottish Parliament (MSP) for the Airdrie and Shotts constituency from 2011 until his retirement in 2021.

== Early life and education ==
Neil was born in Ayrshire Central Hospital, Irvine, the son of Margaret (née Gunning) and Alexander Neil Sr., a coalminer. He was brought up in Patna, Ayrshire, and became involved in Labour politics, joining the Labour Party in 1967, aged 16. He was educated at Ayr Academy, before attending the University of Dundee, where he studied economics. He served as chairman of the Scottish Organisation of Labour Students and later the UK-wide National Organisation of Labour Students.

== Political career ==
=== Early years ===
After graduating with an MA (Hons) degree in 1973, Neil was appointed as the first-ever research officer for the Scottish Executive Committee of the Labour Party. In 1976, Neil, along with Jim Sillars and John Robertson, left the Labour Party to form a breakaway group, the Scottish Labour Party (SLP). Neil served as General Secretary of the SLP from 1976 to 1979. By 1979 the SLP had collapsed and Neil fell out of active politics until 1985 when he joined the Scottish National Party (SNP).

=== SNP ===
Neil would go on to become the SNP's Publicity Director, and then in charge of the party's policy, as well as a candidate in the 1989 Glasgow Central by-election and candidate in the Kilmarnock and Loudoun constituency in the 1992 and 1997 general elections.

=== Member of the Scottish Parliament ===
In 1999 he was elected SNP regional list MSP for Central Scotland in the first Scottish Parliament.

The following year he stood unsuccessfully in the hard-fought contest for the leadership of the SNP against John Swinney. Thereafter he was appointed chair of the Scottish Parliament's Enterprise and Lifelong Learning Committee, a role he kept on until 2003.

In 2003 he was re-elected as SNP MSP for Central Scotland to the Scottish Parliament.

In July 2004, Neil announced that he would not be a candidate in the impending contest for the leadership of the SNP, despite the fact that he believed he had considerable support within the party. He said that the reason for his decision was that senior figures in the party (such as MSP Fergus Ewing and former SNP leader Alex Salmond) had made it clear publicly that they would not work with him as leader. Neil later endorsed Salmond, who he claimed would "unite the party" and was "best placed to maximise the SNP vote".

In 2004 Neil was appointed chair of the Enterprise and Culture Committee. He was also a co-convenor of the Scottish Parliament's Cross-Party Group on the Scottish Economy.

Neil emerged as a leading supporter of former policewoman Shirley McKie as she bid to win compensation from the Scottish Government following her acquittal from perjury charges.

He was again re-elected as a regional MSP for Central Scotland in 2007. He sat on the European and External Relations Committee and the Finance Committee from 2007 to 2009, upon his promotion to Scottish Minister.

He voted for Brexit in the 2016 referendum on the UK's membership of the EU, a choice he made less than two weeks before the vote, and is the only SNP MSP to publicly admit doing so. "I'd only recently left the SNP government and I wasn't going to rock the boat and I quite frankly didn't think it was all that important for me to say that at the time anyway," he told BBC Radio Scotland. "The party's position - the government's position - was very clear and quite frankly, out of loyalty, I didn't think it was right for me at that stage to say so."

=== Government Minister ===
In the first reshuffle of the SNP Government since it took office in 2007, Neil was appointed as the Minister for Housing and Communities in February 2009. In 2011 Neil defeated Karen Whitefield in the Airdrie and Shotts constituency, gaining a majority of 2001, a 5.5% swing from Labour to SNP. He was promoted to the Scottish Cabinet on 19 May 2011 by Alex Salmond to become the new Cabinet Secretary for Infrastructure and Capital Investment after the SNP's landslide win in the 2011 Scottish election.

He was moved from that post to the post of Cabinet Secretary for Health and Wellbeing in September 2012. A month into this post, in an interview with Scotland on Sunday Neil spoke about the possibility of abortion laws being made in Scotland rather than Westminster, saying that politicians would have to consider the medical evidence.

In May 2014, Neil survived a vote of no confidence 57-67. Opposition MSPs had alleged he had behaved improperly by not acting transparently in relation to his role in reversing changes to mental health provision in Monklands Hospital (in his constituency) when he took up his post as Health Secretary.

After Nicola Sturgeon became First Minister of Scotland in November 2014, Neil was appointed to the new post of Cabinet Secretary for Social Justice, Communities and Pensioners' Rights. He resigned from the Government on 18 May 2016.

=== Retirement ===
In August 2020 he announced that he would be standing down as an MSP at the upcoming 2021 Holyrood election. In a statement, he said: "After much soul searching, I have decided that to commit to another five years as an MSP would mean not having the time to pursue all the other things in life I want to do. I also owe it to my wife and family to spend more time with them. I have two beautiful granddaughters who miss me when I am away so often on parliamentary and constituency business. I want to spend more time with them."

In January 2023, Neil stated that Holyrood contained "too many careerists" and argued that reforms were needed to improve the quality of debate in the Chamber. He told The Scottish Sun: "We have very few people in the Parliament, in any of the parties, who (are) prepared to stand up and act independently of their party leadership. I think any parliament worthy of the name has to encourage people who are dissenting voices, they've got to be given their view."

== Awards ==
Neil was honoured three times in the Scottish Politician of the Year awards organised by The Herald newspaper. In 2005, he was named "Donald Dewar Debater of the Year"; in 2017, he won the award in the "Committee Member of the Year" category; and in 2020, he was designated "best of the best" in the "Donald Dewar Debater of the Year" category.

== Personal life ==
Neil is married to Isabella Kerr and together they have one son.

== See also ==
- Government of the 3rd Scottish Parliament
- Government of the 4th Scottish Parliament

Scottish Parliament
New parliament Scotland Act 1998	Member of the Scottish Parliament for Central Scotland; 1999–2011	Succeeded by Richard Lyle
Preceded by Karen Whitefield	Member of the Scottish Parliament for Airdrie and Shotts; 2011–2021	Succeeded by Neil Gray
Political offices
Preceded by Stewart Maxwell as Minister for Communities and Sport	Minister for Housing and Communities; 2009–2011	Succeeded by Keith Brown as Minister for Housing and Transport
New office	Cabinet Secretary for Infrastructure and Capital Investment; 2011–2012	Succeeded by Nicola Sturgeon
Preceded by Nicola Sturgeon	Cabinet Secretary for Health and Wellbeing; 2012–2014	Succeeded by Shona Robison
New office	Cabinet Secretary for Social Justice, Communities and Pensioners' Rights; 2014–2016	Succeeded by Angela Constance
