= John Swinburne (Scottish politician) =

Scottish politician (1930–2017)

Leader of the Scottish Senior Citizens Unity Party
- In office 3 February 2003 – 4 November 2015
- Preceded by: Party founded
- Succeeded by: Party dissolved

Member of the Scottish Parliament for Central Scotland (1 of 7 Regional MSPs)
- In office 1 May 2003 – 2 April 2007

Personal details
- Born: 4 July 1930 Pennsylvania, U.S.
- Died: 1 October 2017 (aged 87) Lanarkshire, Scotland
- Party: Scottish Senior Citizens Unity Party (2003-2015)

John Swinburne (4 July 1930 – 1 October 2017) was an American-born Scottish politician who was the founder and leader of the Scottish Senior Citizens Unity Party (SSCUP). He was that party's only ever representative in the Scottish Parliament, serving as a Member of the Scottish Parliament (MSP) for the Central Scotland list from 2003 until 2007.

== Early life ==
Swinburne was born in Pennsylvania, United States. He was educated at Dalziel High School, Motherwell.

== Political career ==
In 2003 Swinburne stood for election as the SSCUP candidate and gained a list seat in Central Scotland.

Swinburne called for reintroduction of the 'Belt' or 'Tawse' into Scottish schools, expressing the opinion that corporal punishment would solve what he believed were endemic discipline problems. In 2006 his statement was condemned by other MSPs and by the teaching union, the EIS.

Swinburne stood for re-election in the 2007 Scottish Parliament election but lost his list seat, polling only 2% of the vote.

In May 2009, at age 78, Swinburne announced he was planning to stand for the UK Parliament in the 2009 Glasgow North East by-election. He later withdrew from this election, due to "unforeseen circumstances".

== Outside politics ==
He became a director of Motherwell Football Club in 2000 and held this position until 2015.

He died on 1 October 2017.
