= Hugh O'Donnell (politician) =

Scottish politician

Member of the Scottish Parliament for Central Scotland (1 of 7 Regional MSPs)
- In office 3 May 2007 – 22 March 2011

Personal details
- Born: 1 May 1952 (age 73) Glasgow, Scotland
- Party: Scottish Liberal Democrats (until March 2011); Independent (March 2011- May 2011)
- Spouse: Deceased 25 February 2013
- Children: 2

Hugh O'Donnell (born 1 May 1952) is a former Scottish politician.

O'Donnell was elected in 2007 as a Liberal Democrat Member of the Scottish Parliament (MSP) for the Central Scotland region. He was previously an aide to the former MSP Donald Gorrie.

He resigned from the party on 27 March 2011 unhappy with the direction of his party and the UK Coalition Government in Westminster. He sat as an independent MSP until the May 2011 Scottish Parliament election, when he stood as an independent candidate and was not re-elected, having won only 821 votes.

== Background ==
O'Donnell was educated at Falkirk College of Further Education and Queen Margaret College (in partnership with Southern Connecticut State University) and has an HND and a BA (Hons) in Communications.

Prior to his election he worked in retail, property, as a college lecturer, a constituency assistant to Donald Gorrie MSP, and as a community care professional.

He contested the Scottish Parliament election in 1999 for Cumbernauld and Kilsyth, coming a distant third. He was one of only eight Scots chosen by the United Nations to supervise the first ever free elections in the former Yugoslavian province of Kosovo in 2001.

== Party positions ==
O'Donnell was a member of both the Scottish and Federal policy committees and held the position of Vice Convenor and Treasurer of the Central Scotland Liberal Democrats.

He was once the Scottish Liberal Democrat Deputy Spokesperson on Education and Young People.

== Interests ==
O'Donnell had a particular interest in disability rights issues, minority groups' rights and social issues. Outside politics, Hugh's interests are reading, historical research, DIY and tai chi.

O'Donnell is a widower with no partner and has two grown-up children: a son and a daughter.

== Departure from the party ==
On 26 March 2011, O'Donnell announced his decision to leave the Liberal Democrats. He had been the leading candidate in the party's Central Scotland list for the 2011 Holyrood election campaign, but decided to stand as an independent candidate in the region.

O'Donnell criticised the fact that there has not been enough opposition from the Scottish party towards the coalition government policy. He was critical of the party's then Scottish leader Tavish Scott and said founding principles have been "subsumed" by a desire for position and power. The leadership could no longer be regarded as "either Liberal or Democratic", he said, adding: "The greatest betrayal of all, of course, is the alliance formed in London between the Lib Dems and the Tories." He said: "Since that fateful day, I have watched helplessly from the sidelines as this Government at Westminster has attacked every vulnerable group in Scotland, from carers to disabled students to migrants, with some of the most draconian policies I have ever seen in the name of cuts.

O'Donnell said he and his erstwhile MSP colleagues had been told not to air grievances about the Westminster coalition. He said: "Not a word of criticism from the party leadership in Scotland has been uttered - even though the contempt shown for Scotland and, indeed, the federal structure of the party knows no bounds."

O'Donnell expressed his unhappiness with the decision to hold a referendum on whether the Alternative Vote should replace traditional first-past-the-post for Westminster elections on the same day as the Scottish parliamentary election. He also complained that the Scottish Lib Dem group had voted tactically against the SNP's proposed policy on minimum pricing on alcohol, rather than on principle. In 2010, the policy failed to win enough support in parliament to progress, despite support from medical, health, police and victim support groups. He wrote: "I have fought the leadership as hard as I could, but I am just too tired to do it any more... This is not the same party I joined, full of enthusiasm, all those years ago... I can no longer be party to the control freakery, the 'image is everything' attitude, and the dictatorial style of doing things... It is a party I no longer want to be part of and neither should other principled Liberals."

The Scotland on Sunday reported senior party figures were furious that O'Donnell did not speak to leader Tavish Scott before deciding to quit. A senior Liberal Democrat source said: "He didn't even pick up the phone to the party leader. Apparently he's been unhappy for some time. He is not going to be missed and we will be a far more united team without him."
