= Airdrie (Scottish Parliament constituency) =

Constituency of the Scottish Parliament

- County constituency for the Scottish Parliament
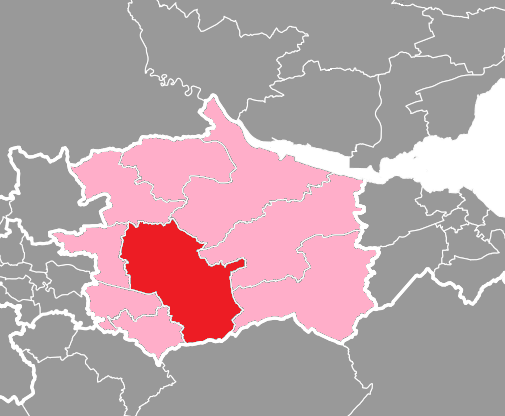

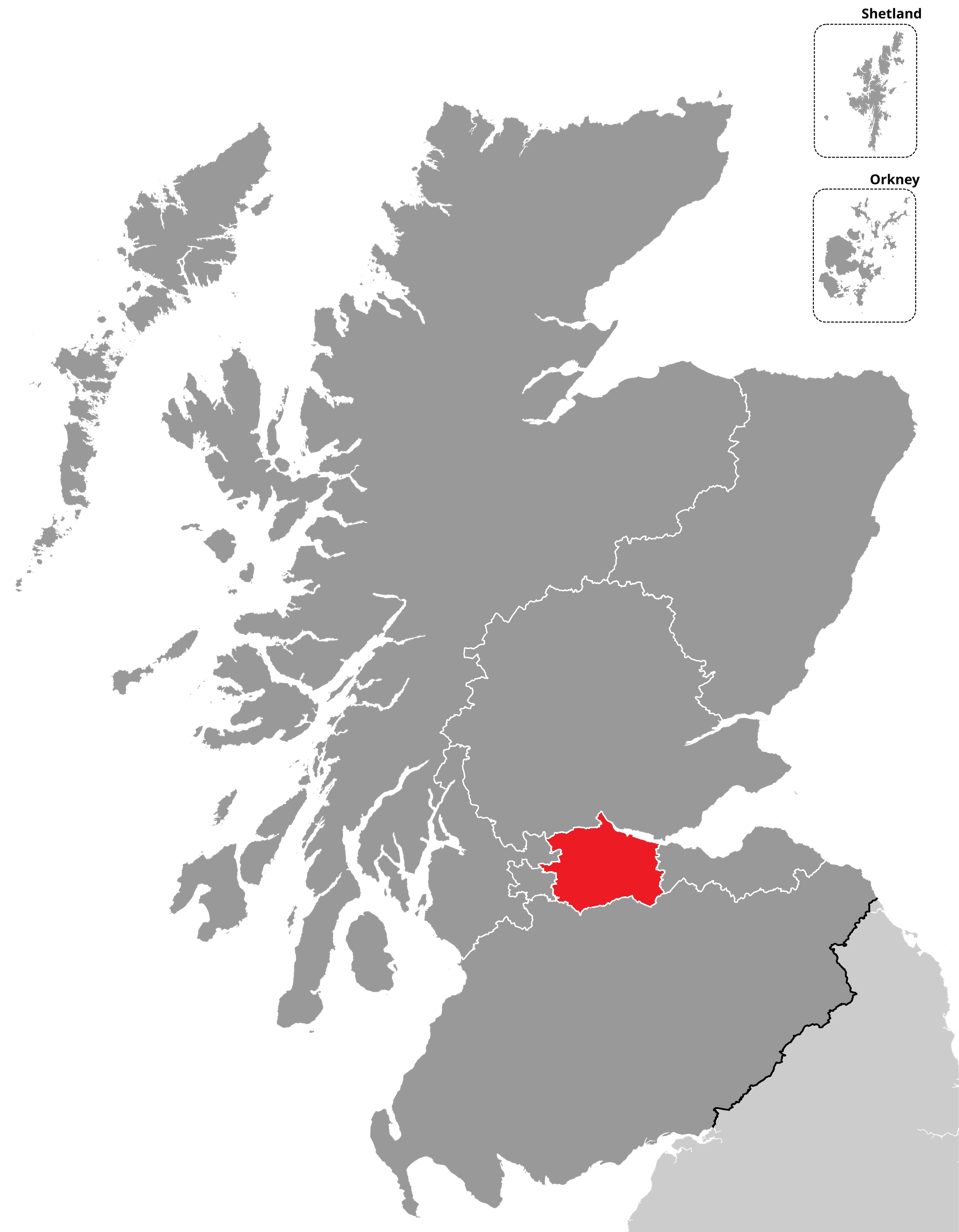
- Airdrie shown within the Central Scotland and Lothians West electoral region, and the region shown within Scotland
- Electoral region: Central Scotland and Lothians West
- Electorate: 54,495 (2026)
- Major settlements: Airdrie, Caldercruix, Shotts

Current constituency
- Created: 1999 (as Airdrie and Shotts)
- Party: Scottish National Party
- MSP: Neil Gray
- Council area: North Lanarkshire

Airdrie (Gaelic: An t-Àrd-Ruigh agus Shotts) is a county constituency of the Scottish Parliament covering part of the council area of North Lanarkshire. It elects one Member of the Scottish Parliament (MSP) by the plurality (first past the post) method of election. Prior to the second periodic review of Scottish Parliament boundaries in 2025 the seat was known as Airdrie and Shotts: the name was changed to avoid confusion with the Airdrie and Shotts constituency of the UK Parliament. The first election under this new name was at the 2026 Scottish Parliament election.

Under the additional-member electoral system used for elections to the Scottish Parliament, the constituency is also one of nine that together form the Central Scotland and Lothians West electoral region, which elects seven additional members, in addition to nine constituency MSPs, to produce a form of proportional representation for the region as a whole.

The seat has been held by Neil Gray of the Scottish National Party since the 2021 Scottish Parliament election.

== Electoral region ==
The other eight constituencies of the Central Scotland and Lothians West region are Almond Valley, Bathgate, Coatbridge and Chryston, Cumbernauld and Kilsyth, Falkirk East and Linlithgow, Falkirk West, Motherwell and Wishaw, and Uddingston and Bellshill. The region covers all of the Falkirk council area, all of the North Lanarkshire council area, all of the West Lothian council area and part of the South Lanarkshire council area.

Prior to the 2025 boundary review Airdrie and Shots was one of nine constituencies forming the Central Scotland region. The other eight seats in this region were: Coatbridge and Chryston, Cumbernauld and Kilsyth, East Kilbride, Falkirk East, Falkirk West, Hamilton, Larkhall and Stonehouse, Motherwell and Wishaw and Uddingston and Bellshill. The region covered all of the Falkirk council area, all of the North Lanarkshire council area and part of the South Lanarkshire council area.

== Constituency boundaries and council area ==
Map of boundaries from 2005

Airdrie and Shotts was created at the same time as the Scottish Parliament, in 1999, with the name and boundaries of the existing Airdrie and Shotts constituency of the House of Commons. Ahead of the 2005 United Kingdom general election, Scottish constituencies for the House of Commons were mostly replaced with new constituencies, whilst initially being retained for elections to the Scottish Parliament. There is no longer any direct link between the boundaries used for the two parliaments.

The seat was renamed simply Airdrie ahead of the 2026 Scottish Parliament election. It is now one of four Scottish Parliament constituencies covering the North Lanarkshire council area, the others being Coatbridge and Chryston, Cumbernauld and Kilsyth, Motherwell and Wishaw and Uddingston and Bellshill, the last of which spans parts of both North and South Lanarkshire.

The constituency lies entirely within the North Lanarkshire council area, and covers following electoral wards of North Lanarkshire Council:

- Airdrie North (entire ward)
- Airdrie Central North (entire ward)
- Airdrie South North (entire ward)
- Fortissat (shared with Motherwell and Wishaw)

== Member of the Scottish Parliament ==
Election	Member	Party
1999	Karen Whitefield	Labour
2011	Alex Neil	SNP
2021	Neil Gray	SNP

== Election results ==
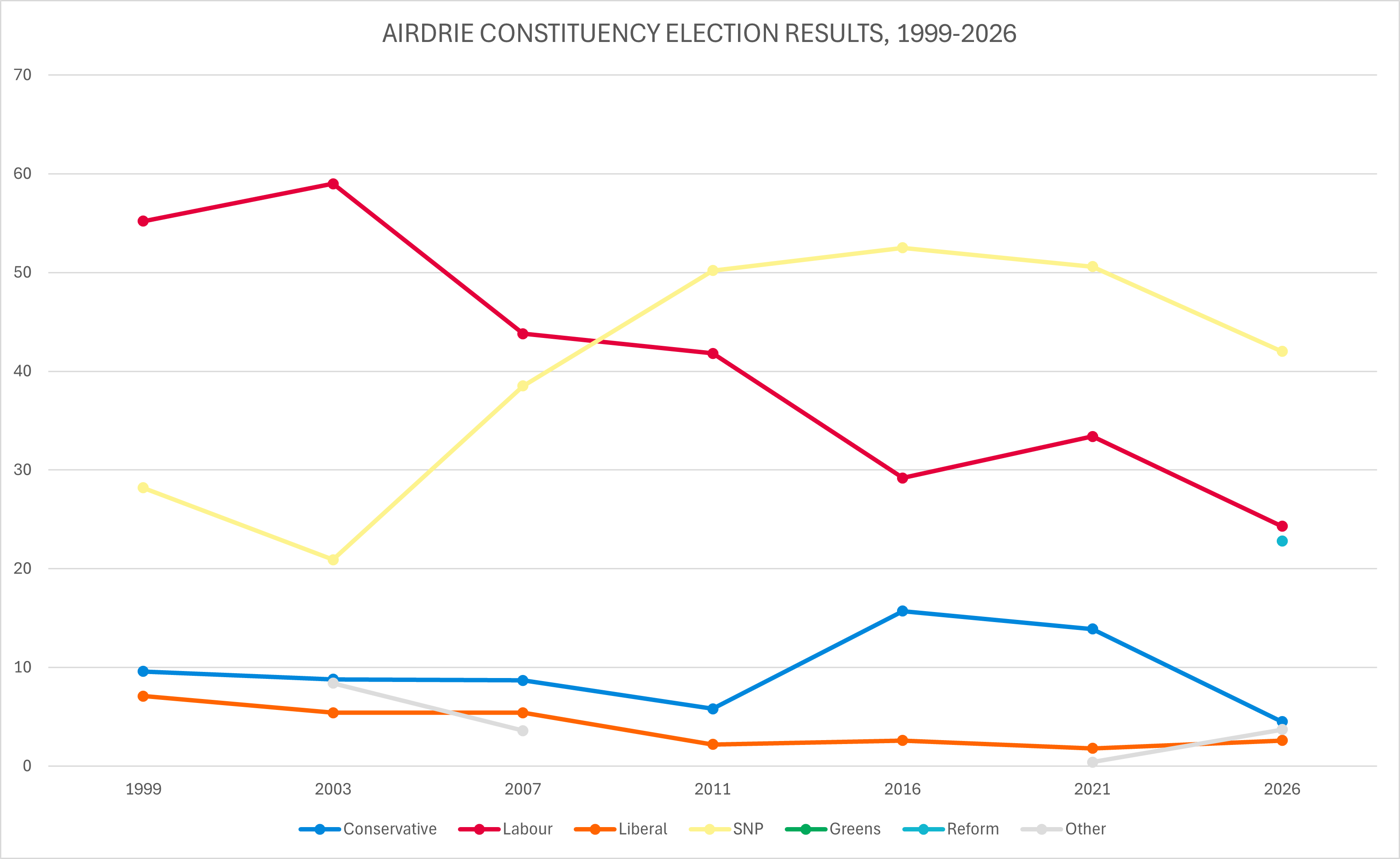
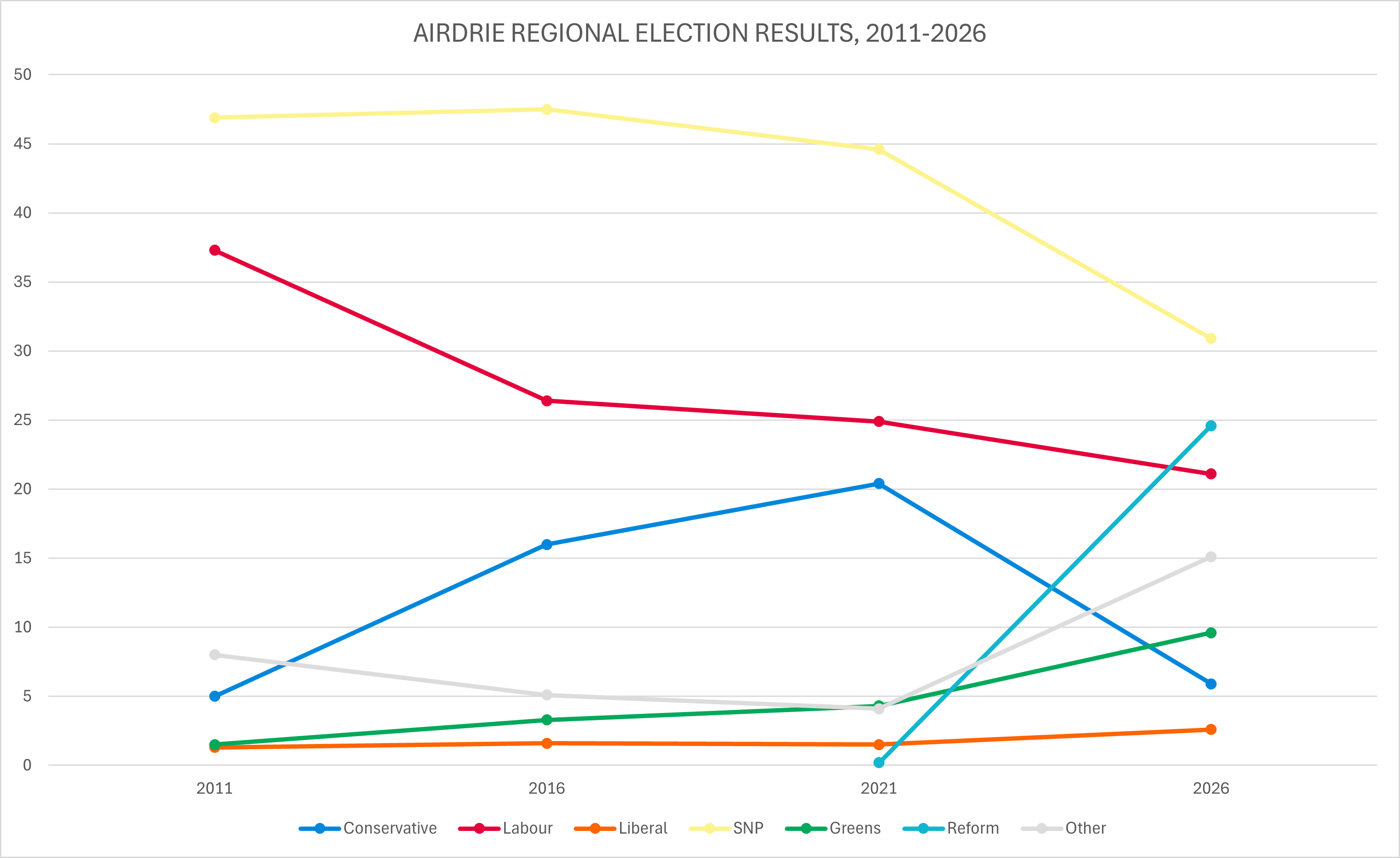

=== 2020s ===
2026 Scottish Parliament election: Airdrie
Party	Candidate	Constituency			Regional		
Party	Candidate	Votes	%	±%	Votes	%	±%
SNP	Neil Gray (Note: Incumbent member for this constituency)	10,711	42.0	▼8.6	7,925	30.9	▼13.7
Labour	Suzanne MacLeod	6,201	24.3	▼9.1	5,408	21.1	▼3.8
Reform	Graham Simpson (Note: Elected on the party list)	5,821	22.8	New	6,302	24.6	▲24.4
Green					2,457	9.6	▲5.3
Conservative	Euan Blockley	1,145	4.5	▼9.4	1,519	5.9	▼14.5
Liberal Democrats	Ed Thornley	660	2.6	▲0.8	670	2.6	▲1.1
Independent	Brendan O'Donnell	505	2.0	New			
AtLS					278	10.8	New
Scottish Family					223	0.9	▲0.4
Independent Green Voice					220	0.9	▲0.4
BUP	John Jo Leckie (Note: Also standing for the Abolish the Scottish Parliament Party - regional votes are for the latter party only.)	441	1.7	New	189	0.7	▲0.5
ISP					180	0.7	New
Scottish Socialist					114	0.4	New
Workers Party					51	0.2	New
Advance UK					49	0.2	New
Scottish Libertarian					44	0.2	Steady
UKIP					24	0.1	▼0.1
Majority		4,510	17.7	▲0.5			
Valid votes		25,484			25,653		
Invalid votes		91			50		
Turnout		25,575	46.93	▼12.17	25,703	47.17	▼11.93
SNP hold		Swing		▲0.3			
Notes

2021 Scottish Parliament election: Airdrie and Shotts
Party	Candidate	Constituency			Regional		
Party	Candidate	Votes	%	±%	Votes	%	±%
SNP	Neil Gray (Note: Incumbent member for this constituency)	16,139	50.6	▼1.9	14,251	44.6	▼2.9
Labour	Richard Leonard (Note: Incumbent member on the party list, or for another constituency)	10,671	33.4	▲4.2	7,964	24.9	▼1.5
Conservative	Ross Lambie	4,422	13.9	▼1.8	6,528	20.4	▲4.4
Liberal Democrats	John Cole	562	1.8	▼0.8	495	1.5	▼0.1
No label	Jimmy Dowson	132	0.4	New			
Green					1,362	4.3	▲1.0
Alba					534	1.7	New
All for Unity					188	0.6	New
Scottish Family					166	0.5	New
Independent Green Voice					148	0.5	New
Abolish the Scottish Parliament					76	0.2	New
Scottish Libertarian					60	0.2	New
Reform					53	0.2	New
UKIP					51	0.2	▼2.5
Freedom Alliance (UK)					46	0.1	New
Independent	Paddy Hogg				33	0.1	New
Majority		5,468	17.2	▼6.1			
Valid votes		31,926			31,955		
Invalid votes		75			49		
Turnout		32,001	59.1	▲9.6	32,004	59.1	▲9.6
SNP hold		Swing		▼3.1			

=== 2010s ===
2016 Scottish Parliament election: Airdrie and Shotts
Party	Candidate	Constituency			Regional		
Party	Candidate	Votes	%	±%	Votes	%	±%
SNP	Alex Neil (Note: Incumbent member for this constituency)	13,954	52.5	▲2.4	12,646	47.5	▲0.6
Labour	Richard Leonard	7,762	29.2	▼12.6	7,029	26.4	▼10.9
Conservative	Eric Holford	4,164	15.7	▲9.8	4,270	16.0	▲11.0
Green					880	3.3	▲1.8
UKIP					730	2.7	▲2.2
Liberal Democrats	Louise Young	693	2.6	▲0.4	423	1.6	▲0.3
Solidarity					279	1.0	▲0.8
RISE					106	0.4	New
Scottish Christian					248	0.9	▼0.4
Independent	Deryck Beaumont				35	0.1	New
Majority		6,192	23.3	▲14.9			
Valid votes		26,573			26,646		
Invalid votes		102			26		
Turnout		26,675	49.5	▲2.8	26,672	49.5	▲2.8
SNP hold		Swing		▲7.5			
Notes

2011 Scottish Parliament election: Airdrie and Shotts
Party	Candidate	Constituency			Regional		
Party	Candidate	Votes	%	±%	Votes	%	±%
SNP	Alex Neil	11,984	50.2	N/A	11,186	46.9	N/A
Labour	Karen Whitefield	9,983	41.8	N/A	8,884	37.3	N/A
Conservative	Robert Crozier	1,396	5.8	N/A	1,186	5.0	N/A
All-Scotland Pensioners Party					461	1.9	N/A
Green					367	1.5	N/A
Socialist Labour					330	1.4	N/A
Scottish Christian					313	1.3	N/A
Liberal Democrats	John Love	531	2.2	N/A	301	1.3	N/A
BNP					278	1.2	N/A
UKIP					110	0.5	N/A
Independent	Hugh O'Donnell				80	0.3	N/A
Scottish Socialist					78	0.3	N/A
Solidarity					43	0.2	N/A
Others					222	0.9	N/A
Majority		2,001	8.4	N/A			
Valid votes		23,894			23,839		
Invalid votes		87			119		
Turnout		23,981	46.7	N/A	23,958	46.7	N/A
SNP win (new boundaries)							

=== 2000s ===
2007 Scottish Parliament election: Airdrie and Shotts
Party	Candidate	Votes	%	±%
Labour	Karen Whitefield	11,907	43.8	−12.8
SNP	Sophia Coyle	10,461	38.5	+17.6
Conservative	Iain McGill	2,370	8.7	−0.1
Liberal Democrats	Robert Gorrie	1,452	5.4	0.0
Scottish Voice	Mev Brown	970	3.6	New
Majority		1,446	5.3	−34.8
Rejected ballots		1,536	2.7	
Turnout		27,160	47.1	+2.8
Labour hold		Swing	-15.2	

2003 Scottish Parliament election: Airdrie and Shotts
Party	Candidate	Votes	%	±%
Labour	Karen Whitefield	14,209	59.0	+4.8
SNP	Gil Paterson	5,232	20.9	−7.3
Conservative	Alan Melville	2,203	8.8	−0.8
Scottish Socialist	Fraser Coates	2,096	8.4	New
Liberal Democrats	Kevin Lang	1,346	5.4	−1.7
Majority		8,977	38.1	+11.1
Turnout		25,086	46.3	−11.3
Labour hold		Swing		

=== 1990s ===
1999 Scottish Parliament election: Airdrie and Shotts
Party	Candidate	Votes	%
Labour	Karen Whitefield	18,338	55.2
SNP	Gil Paterson	9,353	28.2
Conservative	Patrick Ross-Taylor	3,177	9.6
Liberal Democrats	David Miller	2,345	7.1
Majority		8,985	27.0
Turnout		33,213	57.6
Labour win (new seat)			

== See also ==
- List of Scottish Parliament constituencies and electoral regions (2026–)
