= Cathie Craigie =

Scottish politician (1954–2026)

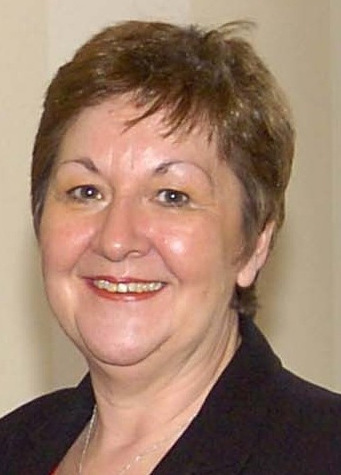
- Craigie in 2009

Member of the Scottish Parliament for Cumbernauld and Kilsyth
- In office 6 May 1999 – 22 March 2011
- Preceded by: Constituency established
- Succeeded by: Jamie Hepburn

Personal details
- Born: 14 April 1954 Stirling, Scotland
- Died: 10 September 2026 (aged 72)
- Party: Scottish Labour

Cathie Craigie (14 April 1954 – 10 September 2026) was a Scottish Labour politician who served as Member of the Scottish Parliament (MSP) for the Cumbernauld and Kilsyth constituency from 1999 to 2011.

== Early life and career in local politics ==
Craigie was born in Stirling on 14 April 1954. She was a district councillor of Cumbernauld and Kilsyth from 1984 to 1994 and district leader from 1994 to 1996. She served as a North Lanarkshire councillor between 1996 and 1999.

== Parliamentary career ==
Craigie was first elected to the Scottish Parliament at the 1999 election. She was re-elected to represent the Cumbernauld and Kilsyth constituency in 2003 with a majority of 520 votes and in 2007 with an increased majority of 2,079. However, at the 2011 election, she lost her seat to Jamie Hepburn of the Scottish National Party (SNP) by 3,459 votes.

She was a member of the Justice Committee and the Petitions Committee in the Scottish Parliament. She was the first woman to successfully steer a Member's Bill, The Mortgage Rights (Scotland) Act, which provides greater protection for those facing repossession, through the parliament. Craigie was also the convenor of the Cross-Party group on Deafness, and was in the process of steering a British Sign Language Bill through the Scottish Parliament before losing her seat.

== Death ==
Craigie died after a short illness on 10 September 2026, aged 72.

Scottish Parliament
New constituency	Member of the Scottish Parliament for Cumbernauld and Kilsyth; 1999–2011	Succeeded by Jamie Hepburn
