= 2005 Scottish Liberal Democrats leadership election =

- 9 May – 23 June 2005
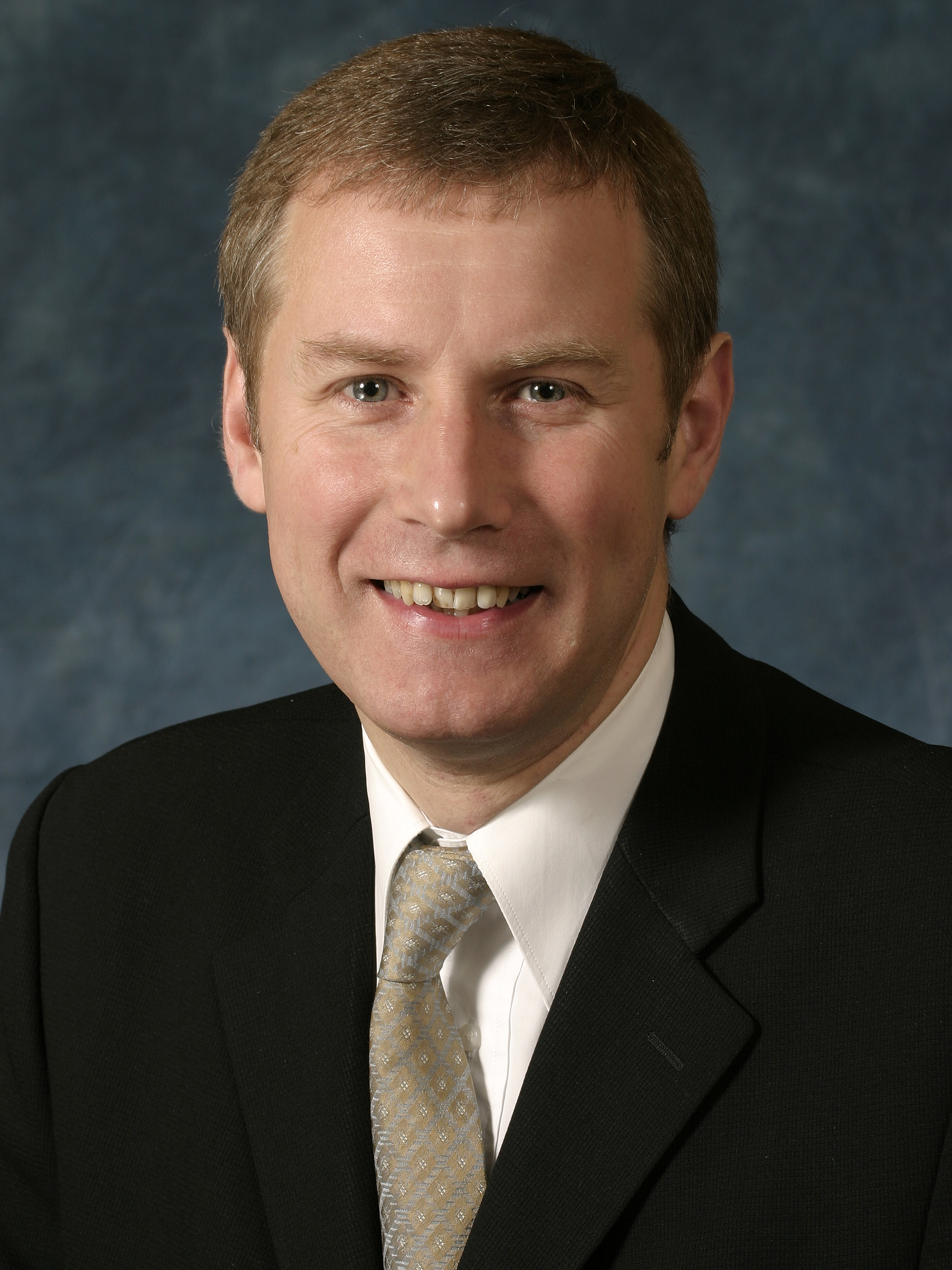

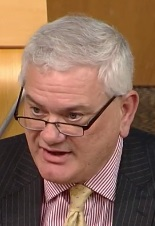
Candidate	Nicol Stephen	Mike Rumbles
Percentage	76.6%	23.4%
Leader before election
Jim Wallace
Elected Leader
Nicol Stephen

The 2005 Scottish Liberal Democrats leadership election was an election to choose a new leader of the Liberal Democrats in Scotland, triggered following the resignation of Jim Wallace. Two candidates were nominated. The 4,500 members were polled. The declaration of results occurred on 23 June 2005. Nicol Stephen was elected. The previous leader Jim Wallace was elected unopposed in 1992 after the resignation of Malcolm Bruce.

== Candidates ==
=== Successfully nominated candidates ===
The following MSPs gained the required one nomination from a fellow MSP, and were therefore candidates for the leadership:

- Nicol Stephen- MSP for Aberdeen South and Transport minister
- Mike Rumbles - MSP for West Aberdeenshire and Kincardine and Lib Dem spokesperson on health

== Result ==
The result of the leadership election was announced on 23 June 2005; turnout of the 4,500 Lib Dem membership was 65%.

First round
Candidate	Votes	
Candidate	Votes	%
Nicol Stephen ✓		76.6%
Mike Rumbles		23.4%
Turnout		65%
Nicol Stephen elected leader Source:
