= Karen Whitefield =

Scottish politician (born 1970)

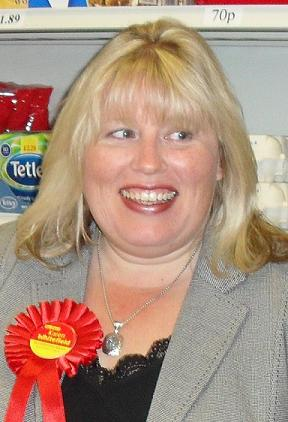

Member of the Scottish Parliament for Airdrie and Shotts
- In office 6 May 1999 – 22 March 2011
- Preceded by: new constituency
- Succeeded by: Alex Neil

Personal details
- Born: 8 January 1970 (age 56) Bellshill, Scotland
- Party: Scottish Labour

Karen Whitefield (born 8 January 1970, Bellshill) is a Scottish Labour politician. She was the Member of the Scottish Parliament (MSP) for the Airdrie and Shotts constituency from 1999 to 2011.

== Political career ==
Prior to her election as MSP, she worked as a personal assistant to Rachel Squire MP.

=== MSP for Airdrie and Shotts: 1999–2011 ===
She was elected as MSP for Airdrie and Shotts at the 1999 Scottish Parliament election. As an MSP, she chaired the Parliament's Education Committee, where she used her casting vote to reject the student graduate endowment bill, a Scottish National Party (SNP) flagship policy. It had the backing of the Liberal Democrats and SNP members, but not the Labour or Conservative members of the committee. The bill was eventually passed in the Scottish Parliament by a vote of 67 to 61. Whitefield was Scottish Labour's shadow Minister for Children in the Scottish Parliament, and Convener of the Cross-Party Group on Diabetes under Iain Gray. At the 2011 Scottish Parliament election, she lost her seat to Alex Neil of the SNP. Whitefield was one of nine Labour MSPs to lose their constituency seats after holding them since the first election to the Scottish Parliament twelve years earlier.

=== Falkirk PPC: 2015 ===
Following the resignation of sitting MP Eric Joyce (and the controversial and flawed 2013 Labour Party Falkirk candidate selection), in a re-run in which all the previous candidates were excluded on 8 December 2013, Whitefield was selected to contest for the Falkirk constituency at the 2015 UK general election. However, at the 2015 UK general election, the SNP won a landslide victory with 56 seats in Scotland; ending 51 years of dominance by Scottish Labour, and Whitefield was unsuccessful in being elected.

=== Labour Leadership 2021 campaign ===
Following the resignation of Scottish Labour leader Richard Leonard, Whitefield chaired Anas Sarwar's leadership campaign. Sarwar was subsequently voted in as the Leader of the Scottish Labour Party in 2021.

== Personal life ==
After her defeat at the 2011 Scottish Parliament election, she subsequently became a campaign officer at USDAW. She is single and lives in the village of Glenmavis.

Scottish Parliament
New parliament Scotland Act 1998	Member of the Scottish Parliament for Airdrie and Shotts; 1999–2011	Succeeded by Alex Neil
