= Margaret Mitchell (Scottish politician) =

Scottish Conservative politician

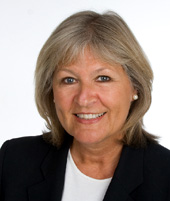
- Mitchell in 2013

Convener of the Justice Committee
- In office 12 May 2016 – 25 March 2021
- Preceded by: Christine Grahame

Scottish Conservative Spokesperson for Justice
- In office 6 September 2013 – 19 May 2016
- Leader: Ruth Davidson
- Preceded by: David McLetchie
- Succeeded by: Douglas Ross

Member of the Scottish Parliament for Central Scotland (1 of 7 regional MSPs)
- In office 1 May 2003 – 5 May 2021

Personal details
- Born: Janet Margaret Fleming; 15 November 1952 (age 73) Coatbridge, North Lanarkshire, Scotland
- Party: Scottish Conservatives
- Spouse: Henry T. Mitchell
- Education: Hamilton Teacher Training College; Open University; University of Strathclyde
- Website: Official website

Janet Margaret Mitchell (born 15 November 1952) is a Scottish Conservative Party politician. She was a Member of the Scottish Parliament (MSP) for the Central Scotland region from 2003 to 2021.

== Early life ==
Mitchell was born in Coatbridge and attended Coatbridge High School and Hamilton Teacher Training College. From 1974 to 1990, she worked as a primary school teacher in Airdrie and Bothwell, before studying at the School of Law of the University of Strathclyde, where she graduated with an LL.B. in 1992 and Diploma in Legal Practice in 1993. From 1993 to 1997, she was a non-executive director of Stonehouse and Hairmyres NHS Trust. She has been a Justice of the Peace (magistrate) in South Lanarkshire since 1990.

== Political career ==
From 1988 to 1996, she was a member and Conservative Group Leader of Hamilton District Council, and from 1999 to 2002 was a special advisor to Scottish Conservatives Leader David McLetchie MSP and James Douglas-Hamilton MSP.

In the Scottish election on 3 May 2007, she failed in her bid to win the Hamilton South constituency, being defeated by Labour's Tom McCabe. However, she was elected as a regional member for the Central Scotland region. She was appointed deputy Scottish Conservative Spokeswoman on Justice, until 2007 when she became Convenor of the Parliament's Equal Opportunities Committee, a role which she held until 2011 after which Mitchell was appointed as the Scottish Conservative Local Government Spokesperson.

In September 2013, Mitchell was re-appointed as the Scottish Conservative Justice Spokesperson and sat on the parliament's Justice Committee and the Justice Sub-Committee on Policing. Mitchell is also a member of the Commonwealth Parliamentary Association (CPA) Scotland Branch Executive Committee. She also opposed the Act of parliament that legalised same-sex marriage in Scotland.

In June 2016, Mitchell voted for the United Kingdom to leave the European Union.

On 17 April 2020, Mitchell announced that she would be stepping down from Holyrood at the 2021 Scottish Parliament election. "By the end of this session in 2021 I will have had the privilege of representing my Central Scotland constituents for 18 years and I thank you all for your support," she said. "However at the end of last year I made the huge decision that, having achieved most of the things I set out to do, I would not seek re-election in 2021. In doing so I am re-assured that I leave my party's representation both at local government and parliamentary level in a much better place.
