= Scottish Senior Citizens Unity Party =

- Leader: John Swinburne
- Founded: 3 February 2003
- Dissolved: 4 November 2015
- Ideology: Elderly interests

The Scottish Senior Citizens Unity Party (SSCUP), later the All-Scotland Pensioners Party from March 2011, was a minor Scottish political party. It was formed on 3 February 2003, in time to contest that year's elections to the Scottish Parliament. The leading figure in its formation and its first leader was John Swinburne, previously a director of Motherwell Football Club. Swinburne was inspired to form the party after reading the UK government's plans for pensions in December 2002: he felt it was unfair that people might have to work longer in the future and consequently have less time to enjoy their retirement.

To fight elections, the SSCUP registered with the UK Electoral Commission and under the provisions of the Political Parties, Elections and Referendums Act 2000, the party also registered alternative names for use on ballot papers, including "Scottish Senior Citizens and Pensioners", and "Alliance of Scots Greys".

On the same day the SSCUP was launched, the Scottish Pensioners Party was formed in Fife. The SSCUP made an electoral pact with this party for the Scottish Parliamentary elections, whereby they did not stand candidates against each other. Former Scottish international footballers Billy McNeill, who played for Celtic and Eric Caldow, who played for Rangers, both stood for the SSCUP in these elections.

John Swinburne was the SSCUP's sole representative in the Scottish Parliament, representing Central Scotland from 2003 until 2007.

== Party aims and elections ==
The party listed nine key aims on its website:

1. An index-linked basic weekly state pension of £160 for all senior citizens
2. Remove all senior citizens from poverty in Scotland
3. Abolition of means-testing for senior citizens
4. Replace council tax with a fairer system based on ability to pay
5. Local authorities to set up more residential homes for senior citizens
6. Free nationwide travel for all senior citizens - outside peak travelling times
7. 50% reduction in television licences for senior citizens aged 60 to 75
8. 50% reduction in vehicle excise duty for all senior citizens
9. Establish a Scottish Lottery, with all profits going back into the community

In the 2007 Scottish Election the SSCUP lost its only seat in Holyrood, despite polling as the sixth best party and a slight increase in its vote share. However, that was possibly due to the party putting up more candidates. In 2011 their vote decreased, but they still remained the sixth placed party.

The party was de-registered in 2015.
