= Scottish National Party leadership election =

Scottish National Party leadership election may refer to:

- 1967 Scottish National Party leadership election
- 1969 Scottish National Party leadership election
- 1979 Scottish National Party leadership election
- 1990 Scottish National Party leadership election
- 2000 Scottish National Party leadership election
- 2003 Scottish National Party leadership election
- 2004 Scottish National Party leadership election
- 2014 Scottish National Party leadership election
- 2023 Scottish National Party leadership election
- 2024 Scottish National Party leadership election

== See also ==
- Scottish National Party depute leadership election (disambiguation)
