= Scottish National Party depute leadership election =

Scottish National Party depute leadership election may refer to:

- 2004 Scottish National Party depute leadership election
- 2014 Scottish National Party depute leadership election
- 2016 Scottish National Party depute leadership election
- 2018 Scottish National Party depute leadership election

== See also ==
- Scottish National Party leadership election (disambiguation)
