= 2014 Scottish National Party leadership election =

Scottish National Party (SNP) leadership election

- 14 November 2014
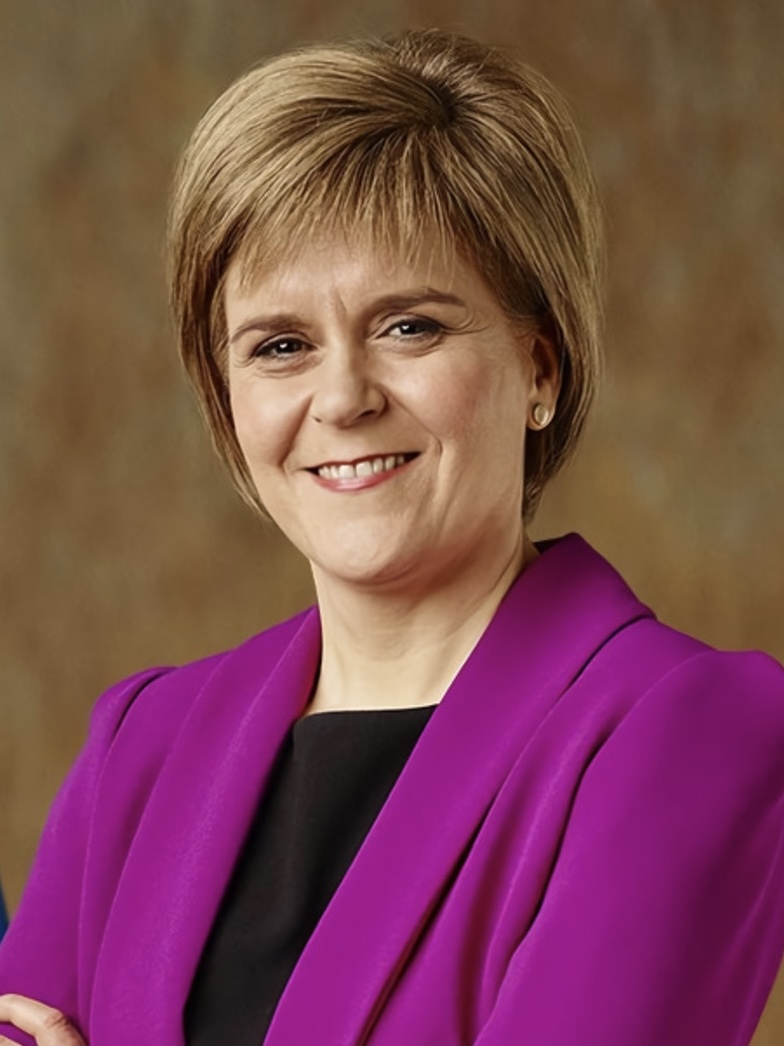
Candidate	Nicola Sturgeon
Popular vote	Unopposed
Leader before election
Alex Salmond
Elected Leader
Nicola Sturgeon

The 2014 Scottish National Party leadership election was held to choose the leader of the Scottish National Party (SNP) and First Minister of Scotland, following the resignation of Alex Salmond as first minister and leader. Nicola Sturgeon emerged as the only candidate and was elected unopposed as leader of the SNP.

In the previous election, held ten years prior in 2004, Salmond was elected, on a joint ticket with Sturgeon as depute, to succeed John Swinney after he resigned following poor SNP electoral performances. Salmond led the party through the 2007 Scottish Parliament election, with the SNP emerging as the largest party and forming a minority government, with the support of the Scottish Greens. The SNP won an overwhelming majority in the 2011 election. Salmond's new majority administration pushed for its manifesto commitment of holding a referendum on Scottish independence. In the 2014 referendum, a majority of Scots voted in favour of remaining part of the United Kingdom. The defeat of the Yes Scotland campaign, resulted in Salmond's resignation. He resigned at party's annual conference in Perth in November 2014.

Sturgeon was the first, and only one, to announce their candidacy for leadership of the SNP. Many prominent members of the SNP were speculated to run, however, they declined and instead endorsed Sturgeon for leader. On 15 October 2014, she was confirmed as the next leader of the SNP, becoming the de facto leader-in-waiting. Sturgeon officially succeeded Salmond unopposed at the party's conference in November 2014. She became the first female leader and was subsequently appointed First Minister of Scotland.

When Sturgeon announced her candidacy for leader, she also announced she would step down as depute leader of the SNP, triggering a depute leadership contest. Stewart Hosie, Keith Brown and Angela Constance all ran in the election, with Hosie defeating both candidates in the first and second round and succeeding Sturgeon as depute leader.

== Background ==
=== Internal party division ===
In the 2000 leadership election, John Swinney succeeded Salmond as leader of the SNP, after defeating Alex Neil. The election was seen as a fight between the SNP's fundamentalists, who Neil represented, and gradualists, who Swinney represented. Both campaigns disagreed on the approach of gaining Scottish independence, and these differing views, would dominate the leadership of Swinney.

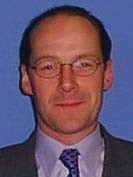
John Swinney served as leader from 2000 until his resignation in 2004

Swinney led the SNP through the 2001 UK General election and the 2003 election to the 2nd Scottish Parliament. In both elections, the SNP performed poorly and the media raised some doubt about his ability to lead the party. In the aftermath of the SNP's poor election performance in 2003, Bill Wilson, a party activist, became convinced that a change of direction was needed by the SNP leadership. After discussing this with various SNP members, he was persuaded to contest the leadership himself and launched a challenge against the Swinney. Wilson ran a campaign attacking Swinney's proposals for party reform, which he claimed would centralise power and impoverish local branches. Wilson also challenged Swinney to a series of debates, although Swinney refused to take part. Wilson also attacked what he saw as the "New Labourization" of the party, and argued that the party was more effective at pressuring Labour into changing positions on issues, rather than actively seeking power itself.

The election was also yet another fight between the party's Fundamentalists and gradualists, with Wilson attacking Swinney's proposal for a referendum on independence before pursuing negotiations with the British government. Wilson argued that as soon as the SNP can form a government it should pursue negotiations to end the union. Roseanna Cunningham called Wilson was a "stalking horse" candidate put forward to "weaken and damage" the leadership.

The election was held at the party's 69th annual conference, and saw Swinney winning a massive victory over Wilson. Moves in support of Wilson's proposition of pursuing independence negotiations without a referendum were thrown out at the party conference, and Swinney won significant policy battles over imposing a monthly levy on party MP's, MSP's, and MEP's. In a surprise result, the new central membership system was also approved. The membership changes had been a key issue of attack from Wilson. This was the last SNP election to use the delegate voting method. Future elections would be based on a one-person-one-vote postal vote system.

Following a disappointing European election result in 2004, which saw the party dropping to less than 20% of the vote, senior figures within the SNP began privately briefing against Swinney. Gil Paterson, a former MSP for Central Scotland was the first to call for Swinney's departure, with Michael Russell, a former potential campaign manager for Swinney calling for a change in approach from the SNP. Members of the SNP shadow cabinet began privately discussing removing Swinney from the leadership, and Alex Salmond advised Swinney to resign in exchange for senior party figures not calling openly for his resignation. He resigned on 22 June 2004 triggering a leadership contest.

=== 2004 leadership election ===
Following the resignation of Swinney, the 2004 SNP leadership contest was held to elect a new leader. Roseanna Cunningham was the first to launch her leadership campaign and she was shortly followed by Sturgeon and Michael Russell. Alex Neil, who ran in the previous election against Swinney, considered running again for party leader, although later pulled out of the race. Neil blamed Alex Salmond for "vetoing" his candidacy, and claimed that both Salmond and Fergus Ewing had stated they would refuse to work with him were he to have been elected. Neil claimed that this treatment was in line with the treatment of him and his supporters since the 2000 leadership election. The fight over who was to succeed Swinney saw the re-emergence of former leader Alex Salmond, who entered the race despite having repeatedly denied any ambitions to run. Most famously, Salmond quipped in June 2004 that "If nominated I'll decline. If drafted I'll defer. And if elected I'll resign." Salmond launched his campaign less than a month later, on 15 July. After Salmond announced his campaign for the leadership, Sturgeon dropped her bid, and ran instead for the Deputy Leadership. The two ran on a joint campaign. Kenny MacAskill dropped his bid for Deputy Leader, and gave his support to Sturgeon.

The results were announced on 3 September; Salmond defeated Cunningham and Russell, with more than 75% of votes. Sturgeon was elected as Depute Leader, after defeating Fergus Ewing and Christine Grahame. As Salmond was still an MP in the British House of Commons, Sturgeon led the SNP in the Scottish Parliament as leader of the largest opposition party until the 2007 election.

=== SNP in government; 2007 to 2014 ===
In the 2007 Scottish Parliament election, the SNP emerged as the largest party, one seat more than the incumbent Scottish Labour administration led by Jack McConnell. After unsuccessful attempts to form a coalition with the Scottish Liberal Democrats, the SNP formed a minority government with the confidence and supply of the Scottish Greens. For the first time since the Parliament's incarceration in 1999, the SNP entered government with Salmond as First Minister of Scotland.

Salmond made attempts to pass legislation for a referendum on Scottish independence, however, the party's minority and a lack of pro-independence parties failed to obtain support. Salmond pledged to hold an independence referendum if the SNP won another term in office. In the 2011 Scottish Parliament election, the SNP won an overwhelming single party majority. Salmond was re-elected as First Minister and pushed for his manifesto commitment on a referendum.

=== 2014 Scottish independence referendum ===
An agreement was signed on 15 October 2012 by David Cameron and Salmond which provided a legal framework for the referendum to be held, and on 21 March 2013 the SNP government announced that the referendum would be held on 18 September 2014. Scotland's Future, a white paper setting out the Scottish Government's vision for an independent Scotland, was published on 26 November 2013.

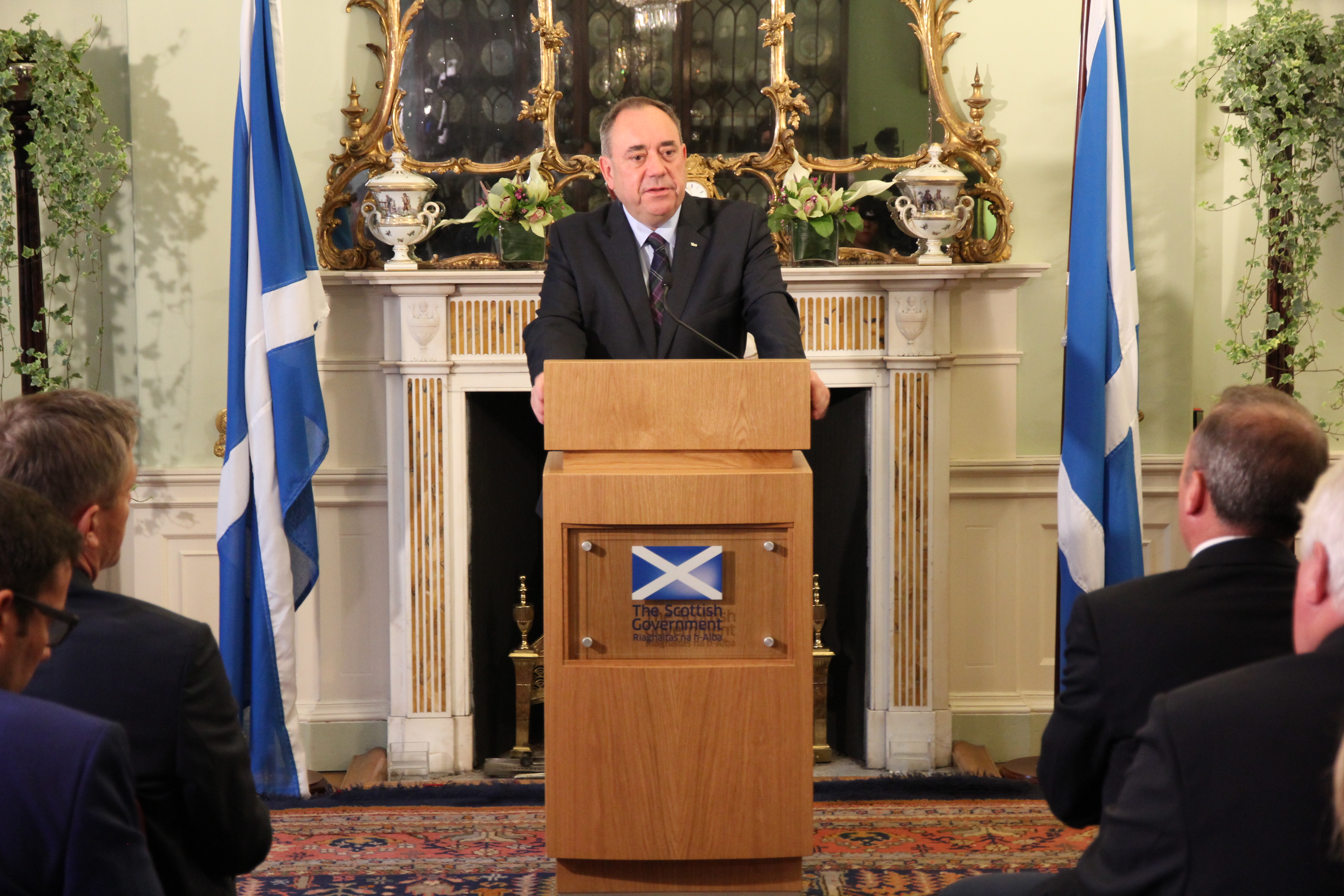
Alex Salmond delivering his resignation speech as First Minister

=== Resignation of Alex Salmond ===
On 19 September 2014, following the results of the independence referendum which confirmed a majority of the Scottish people had voted against independence, Salmond announced that he would be resigning as First Minister in November 2014.

My time as leader is nearly over, but for Scotland, the campaign continues and the dream shall never die.

— Alex Salmond

== Campaign ==
On 24 September 2014, Sturgeon officially launched her campaign to be the next leader of the SNP in Glasgow.

== Candidates ==
=== Nominated ===
Candidate	Political office	Campaign	Date declared	Campaign progression	Ref.
Nicola Sturgeon	Deputy First Minister of Scotland (2007–2014); Depute Leader of the SNP (2004–2014)		24 September 2014	Elected unopposed	

=== Declined ===
The following MSPs were speculated by the media to run for leadership of the SNP but subsequently declined to stand:

- Roseanna Cunningham, MSP for Perthshire South and Kinross-shire, Minister for Community Safety
- Alex Neil, MSP for Airdrie and Shotts, Cabinet Secretary for Health and Wellbeing (endorsed Sturgeon)
- Michael Russell, MSP for Argyll and Bute, Cabinet Secretary for Education and Lifelong Learning (endorsed Sturgeon)
- John Swinney, MSP for Perthshire North, Cabinet Secretary for Finance, Employment and Sustainable Growth (endorsed Sturgeon)
- Humza Yousaf, MSP for Glasgow, Minister for Europe and International Development (endorsed Sturgeon)

== Endorsements ==
=== Nicola Sturgeon ===
==== Members of the Scottish Parliament ====
1. Angela Constance, MSP for Almond Valley, Cabinet Secretary for Training, Youth and Women’s Employment
2. James Dornan, MSP for Glasgow Cathcart
3. Fiona Hyslop, MSP for Linlithgow, Cabinet Secretary for Culture and External Affairs
4. Michael Matheson, MSP for Falkirk West, Minister for Public Health
5. Kenny MacAskill, MSP for Edinburgh Eastern, Cabinet Secretary for Justice
6. Christina McKelvie, MSP for Hamilton, Larkhall and Stonehouse
7. Alex Neil, MSP for Airdrie and Shotts, Cabinet Secretary for Health and Wellbeing
8. Shona Robison, MSP for Dundee City East, Cabinet Secretary for Commonwealth Games, Sport, Equalities and Pensioners' Rights
9. Michael Russell, MSP for Argyll and Bute, Cabinet Secretary for Education and Lifelong Learning
10. John Swinney, MSP for Perthshire North, Cabinet Secretary for Finance, Employment and Sustainable Growth
11. Humza Yousaf, MSP for Glasgow, Minister for Europe and International Development

==== Members of Parliament ====
1. Stewart Hosie, MP for Dundee East
2. Angus MacNeil, MP for Na h-Eileanan an Iar
3. Angus Robertson, MP for Moray, Leader of the SNP in the British House of Commons
4. Mike Weir, MP for Angus

==== Individuals ====
1. Tasmina Ahmed-Sheikh, SNP activist, businesswoman, actress and lawyer
2. Martin Docherty-Hughes, SNP activist
3. Stewart McDonald, SNP activist
4. Stefan Tymkewycz, former MSP

== Leadership election ==
SNP depute leader and Deputy First Minister Nicola Sturgeon was widely tipped as the favourite to succeed Salmond after the election. She was backed by a number of Scottish government ministers, including Alex Neil and Humza Yousaf, and former SNP leader Gordon Wilson.

Sturgeon officially launched her campaign bid to succeed Salmond on 24 September 2014. On 15 October 2014, the SNP confirmed that Sturgeon was the only candidate for the leadership, and therefore de facto leader-in-waiting. It had been obvious even before then that no one else would garner enough nominations to make a viable bid for the post.

She was formally acclaimed as the party's first female leader at the SNP Autumn Conference on 14 November 2014. This all but assured her formal election as First Minister on 19 November 2014.

== Deputy leadership election ==
Three people, Angela Constance, Keith Brown and Stewart Hosie launched bids to succeed Sturgeon as SNP Depute Leader. Constance said that she would not seek to become Deputy First Minister to Sturgeon, even if she was elected Deputy Leader. The results were announced at the conference, with Hosie polling 42.2%, Brown on 34.2% and Constance on 23.5% in the first round of the single transferable vote election. In the second round, Hosie was elected after getting 55.5% of votes following the elimination of Constance. The Depute Leadership election had a turnout of 55.7%. With Hosie serving in Westminster, John Swinney was appointed as Deputy First Minister when Sturgeon took office on 19 November.

First round
Candidate	Votes	
Candidate	Votes	%
Stewart Hosie	N/A	42.2%
Keith Brown	N/A	34.2%
Angela Constance ✗	N/A	23.5%

Second round
Candidate	Votes	
Candidate	Votes	%
Stewart Hosie ✓	18,915	55.5%
Keith Brown	15,150	44.4%
