= 2004 Scottish National Party leadership election =

Scottish National Party (SNP) leadership election

- 22 June – 3 September 2004
- Turnout: 79.23%
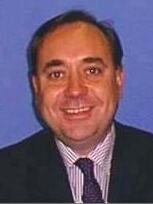

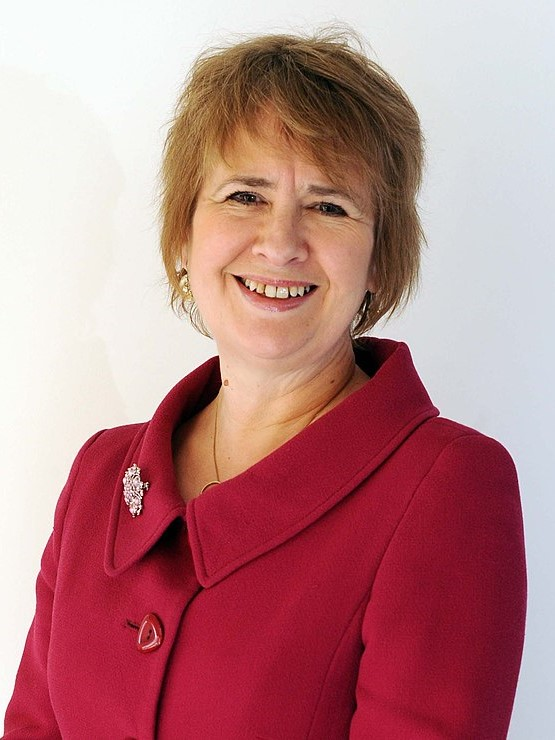

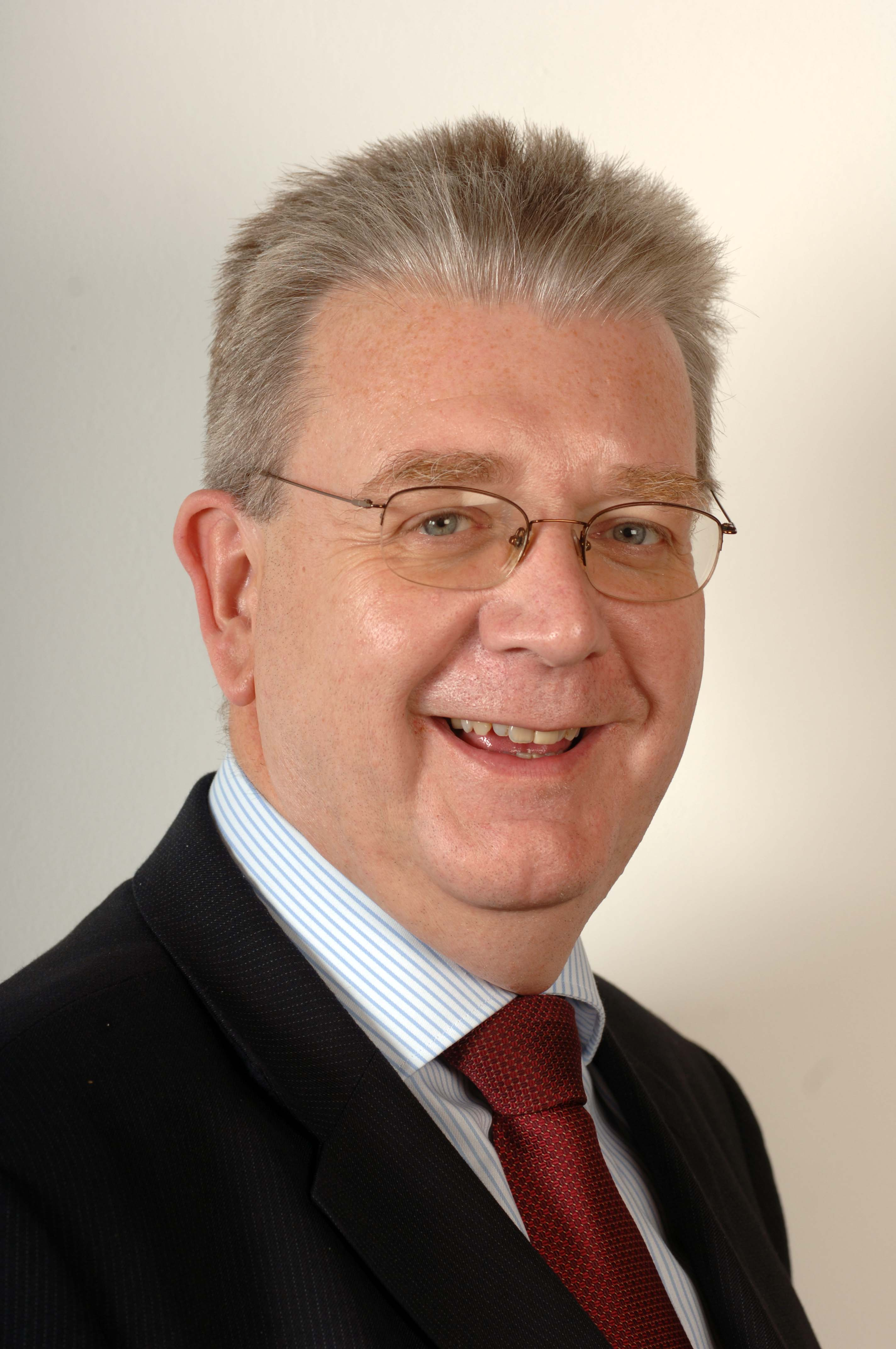
| Candidate | Alex Salmond | Roseanna; Cunningham | Michael Russell |
| Popular vote | 4,952 | 953 | 631 |
| Percentage | 75.8% | 14.6% | 9.7% |
Leader before election
John Swinney
Elected Leader
Alex Salmond

The 2004 Scottish National Party leadership election was held following the resignation of John Swinney as leader of the Scottish National Party (SNP). Nominations opened on 22 June, with three candidates nominated, and voting began on 13 August. This was the first election where all party members could vote. The results were announced on 3 September; Alex Salmond defeated Roseanna Cunningham and Michael Russell, with more than 75% of votes.

In 2003, Swinney's leadership was challenged by SNP activist, Bill Wilson, who claimed the party needed a change in direction following a poor performance at the 2003 Scottish Parliament election. Despite Swinney winning overwhelming support from party delegates, he would lead the party through, yet another, poor election result in the 2004 European Parliament election. The SNP began privately briefing against Swinney and on 18 June 2004 he resigned as leader.

Cunningham was the first to launch her bid for leader, and she was shortly followed by Nicola Sturgeon and then Russell. Speculation arose as to whether Alex Neil, who ran in the 2000 leadership contest against Swinney, and Salmond, former SNP leader, would run in the election. Neil declined and while Salmond did too, a month later, he launched his bid. As a result, Sturgeon withdrew to support him and she instead ran for Depute Leader on a joint ticket.

An election for Depute Leader of the SNP was held at the same time, with Sturgeon defeating Fergus Ewing and Christine Grahame.

== Background ==
Alex Salmond led the Scottish National Party (SNP) through the first election to the new devolved Scottish Parliament. The SNP had done well in opinion polls running up to the election, gaining 40% in some approval ratings, however, they failed to maintain this level of support. The party emerged as the second largest by both vote share and seats in the parliament and Salmond served as the parliament's opposition leader to the Scottish Labour-Liberal Democrat government. On 18 July 2000, Salmond resigned as the SNP leader and stood down as a Member of the Scottish Parliament (MSP). His resignation came in the face of internal criticism after a series of high-profile fall-outs with party members. He remained a Member of Parliament (MP) in the British House of Commons and led the SNP's Westminster group.

=== 2000 leadership election ===
The 2000 SNP leadership election was triggered following the resignation of Salmond. John Swinney, Depute Leader of the Scottish National Party, and Alex Neil, Shadow Minister for Social Security, went head-to-head for the leadership role. Whilst both candidates supported the position of the SNP on the centre-left, Neil was seen as the more left-wing of the two, and individuals associated with the Neil campaign argued that a Swinney leadership would drag the SNP to the right.

In some ways the race was seen as being between the SNP's Fundamentalists and gradualists. Swinney was seen as representing the SNP gradualist wing, advocating devolution as a stepping stone towards Scottish independence. Neil however was far more critical and suspicious of devolution, viewing it as a means of undermining the case for independence, and was more forceful in pushing for a party emphasis on Scottish independence. Swinney, as a gradualist, argued that independence could only follow a successful vote in a referendum, whilst Neil believed that an SNP victory would be enough to secure negotiations for independence.

Both candidates opposed trident, and were largely pro-European Union. Swinney however advocated joining the Euro at the earliest opportunity, whilst Neil believed pre-emptive joining of the Euro could undermine Scottish jobs. Swinney also favoured greater European integration on issues such as defence, whilst Neil favoured a weaker EU, and opposed the pooling of defence forces.

Swinney won overwhelmingly with 67.1% and was appointed Leader of the Scottish National Party. As Swinney was Depute Leader of the SNP, this triggered a depute leadership election. Roseanna Cunningham defeated Kenny MacAskill in the race.

=== 2003 SNP leadership challenge ===
Results of the 2003 Scottish Parliament election

Swinney led the SNP through the 2001 UK General election and the 2003 election to the 2nd Scottish Parliament. In both elections, the SNP performed poorly and the media raised some doubt about his ability to lead the party. In the aftermath of the SNP's poor election performance in 2003, Bill Wilson, a party activist, became convinced that a change of direction was needed by the SNP leadership. After discussing this with various SNP members, he was persuaded to contest the leadership himself and launched a challenge against Swinney.

Wilson ran a campaign attacking Swinney's proposals for party reform, which he claimed would centralise power and impoverish local branches. Wilson also challenged Swinney to a series of debates, although Swinney refused to take part. Wilson also attacked what he saw as the "New Labourization" of the party, and argued that the party was more effective at pressuring Labour into changing positions on issues, rather than actively seeking power itself.

The election was also yet another fight between the party's Fundamentalists and gradualists, with Wilson attacking Swinney's proposal for a referendum on independence before pursuing negotiations with the British government. Wilson argued that as soon as the SNP can form a government it should pursue negotiations to end the union. Roseanna Cunningham called Wilson was a "stalking horse" candidate put forward to "weaken and damage" the leadership.

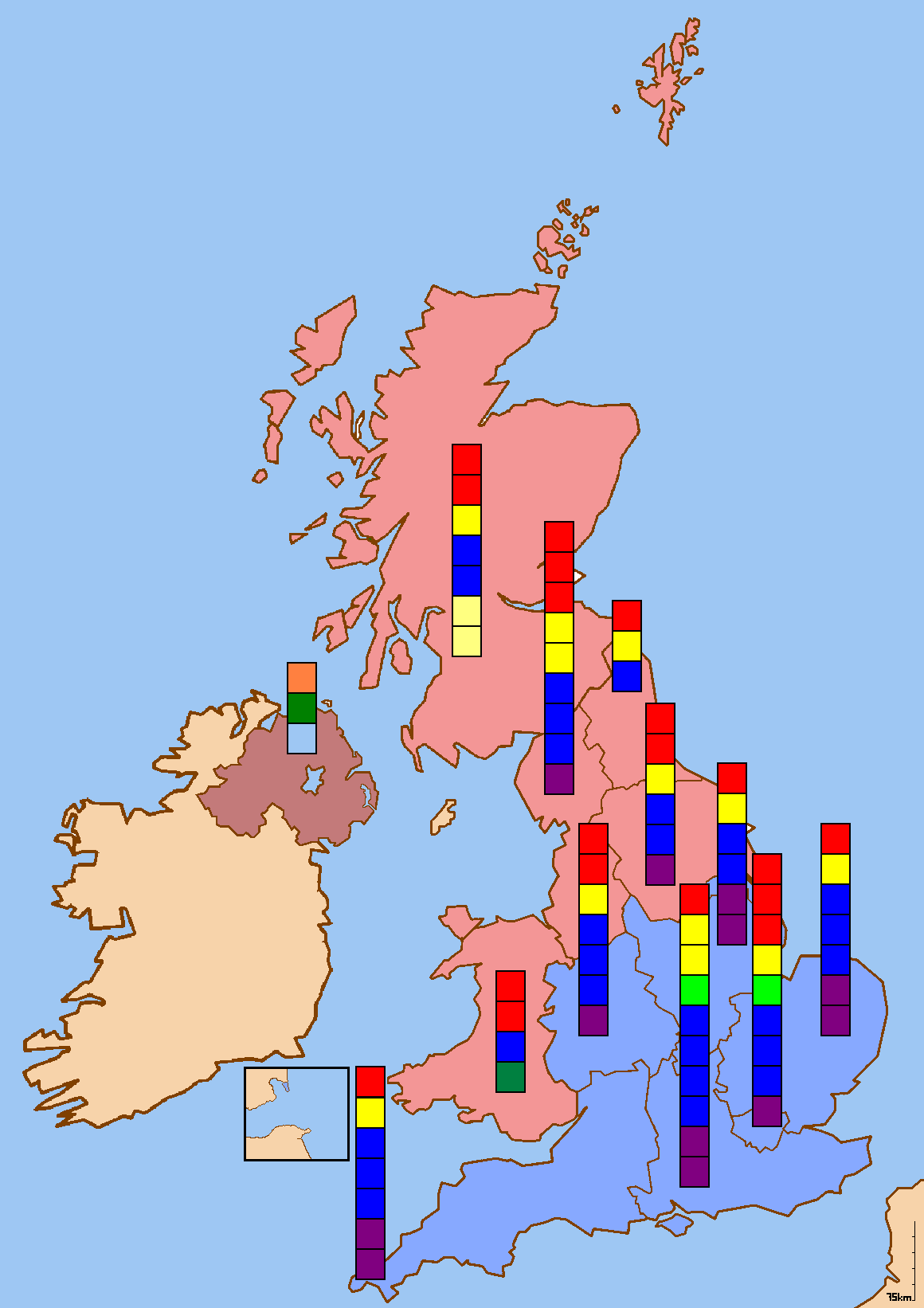
Results of the 2004 European Parliament election in the UK

The election was held at the party's 69th annual conference, and saw Swinney winning a massive victory over Wilson. Moves in support of Wilson's proposition of pursuing independence negotiations without a referendum were thrown out at the party conference, and Swinney won significant policy battles over imposing a monthly levy on party MP's, MSP's, and MEP's. In a surprise result, the new central membership system was also approved. The membership changes had been a key issue of attack from Wilson. This was the last SNP election to use the delegate voting method. Future elections would be based on a one-person-one-vote postal vote system.

=== Resignation of Swinney ===
Following a disappointing European election result in 2004, which saw the party dropping to less than 20% of the vote, senior figures within the SNP began privately briefing against Swinney. Gil Paterson, a former MSP for Central Scotland was the first to call for Swinney's departure, with Michael Russell, a former potential campaign manager for Swinney calling for a change in approach from the SNP. Members of the SNP shadow cabinet began privately discussing removing Swinney from the leadership, and Alex Salmond advised Swinney to resign in exchange for senior party figures not calling openly for his resignation. He resigned on 22 June 2004 triggering a leadership contest.

== Campaign ==
=== Salmond–Sturgeon campaign ===
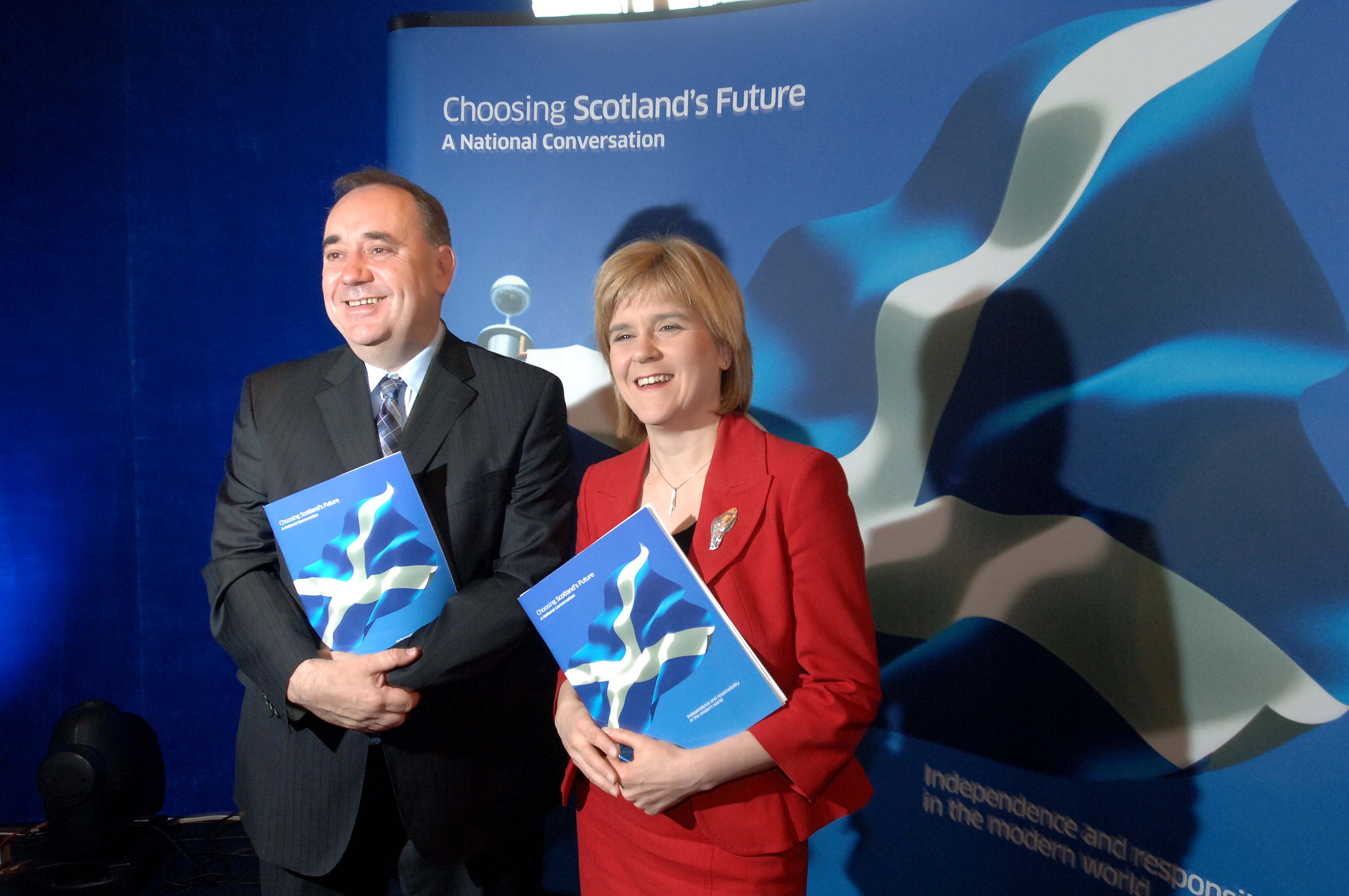
Alex Salmond and Nicola Sturgeon ran on a joint ticket for the leadership contest

The fight over who was to succeed Swinney saw the re-emergence of former leader Alex Salmond, who entered the race despite having repeatedly denied any ambitions to run. Most famously, Salmond quipped in June 2004 that "If nominated I'll decline. If drafted I'll defer. And if elected I'll resign." Salmond launched his campaign less than a month later, on 15 July.

After Salmond announced his campaign for the leadership, Nicola Sturgeon dropped her bid, and ran instead for the Deputy Leadership. The two ran on a joint campaign. Kenny MacAskill dropped his bid for Deputy, and gave his support to Sturgeon.

=== Neil candidacy ===
Alex Neil, a member of the SNP fundamentalist grouping who ran against Swinney for the leadership in 2000 considered running again for party leader, although later pulled out of the race. Neil blamed Alex Salmond for "vetoing" his candidacy, and claimed that both Salmond and Ewing had stated they would refuse to work with him were he to have been elected. Neil claimed that this treatment was in line with the treatment of him and his supporters since the 2000 leadership election. Neil's campaign was also undermined by two further issues; the impression amongst the party leadership that Neil allies, such as Campbell Martin, had constantly undermined Swinney's leadership, and the fact that Neil supporters had been fundamentalist SNP party members not to renew their party membership. Rules around the holding of the new leadership election meant that any members who had not renewed their membership found it difficult to register in time.

== Candidates ==
=== Nominated ===
The following three candidates were nominated on 16 July 2004:

| Candidate | Born | Most recent position (at time of contest) | Announced | Campaign | Ref. |
|---|---|---|---|---|---|
| Roseanna Cunningham | 27 July 1951; Glasgow, Scotland | Depute Leader of the Scottish National Party (2000–2004) | 22 June 2004 | Website | |
| Michael Russell | 8 August 1953; Bromley, Kent, England | Shadow Minister for Education and Culture (2000–2003) | 28 June 2004 | Website | |
| Alex Salmond | 31 December 1954; Linlithgow, Lothian, Scotland | Leader of the Scottish National Party (1990–2000) | 15 July 2004 | Website | |

=== Withdrew ===
The following MSPs announced that they would seek the leadership of the SNP but subsequently did not stand, or withdrew from the race, due to insufficient support or other reasons:

| Candidate | Born | Most recent position (at time of contest) | Announced | Withdrew | Reason | Ref. |
|---|---|---|---|---|---|---|
| Nicola Sturgeon | 19 July 1970; Irvine, Ayrshire, Scotland | Shadow Minister for Justice (2003–2004) | 24 June 2004 | 15 July 2004 | Endorsed Salmond and ran on a joint ticket for Depute Leadership. | |

=== Declined ===
The following MSPs publicly expressed interest in the leadership of the SNP but subsequently declined to stand:

- Fergus Ewing, Shadow Minister for Finance
- Kenny MacAskill
- Alex Neil, Convenor of the Scottish Parliament's Enterprise and Lifelong Learning Committee (endorsed Salmond)

== Result ==
The election was the first SNP election to use the one-person-one-vote postal voting system.

=== Leadership election ===
| Candidate | Votes | |
| Candidate | Votes | % |
|---|---|---|
| Alex Salmond ✓ | 4,952 | 75.8% |
| Roseanna Cunningham | 953 | 14.6% |
| Michael Russell | 631 | 9.7% |

== Depute Leadership election ==
| Candidate | Votes | |
| Candidate | Votes | % |
|---|---|---|
| Nicola Sturgeon ✓ | 3,521 | 53.9% |
| Fergus Ewing | 1,605 | 24.6% |
| Christine Grahame | 1,410 | 21.6% |
