= Campbell Martin =

British politician (born 1960)

Member of the Scottish Parliament for West of Scotland (1 of 7 Regional MSPs)
- In office 1 May 2003 – 2 April 2007

Personal details
- Born: 10 March 1960 (age 66)
- Party: Scottish National Party
- Other political affiliations: Independent (July 2004 – April 2007)

Campbell Martin (born 10 March 1960) is a Scottish journalist and former politician.

At the 2003 Scottish Parliament election, he was elected on the Scottish National Party (SNP) list as a Member of the Scottish Parliament (MSP) for the West of Scotland. He was expelled from the SNP in 2004, and sat as an independent MSP until the 2007 election, when he stood in the Cunninghame North constituency but not the West of Scotland region. He was not re-elected.

== Political career ==
Martin previously worked for Kay Ullrich, a SNP MSP. When she indicated she would stand down at the 2003 election, Martin was selected to be the candidate for Cunninghame North as well as being placed at the top of the SNP's list. At the election, he was unsuccessful in the constituency vote, however, was elected as a regional member for the West of Scotland.

He was a prominent backer of Dr Bill Wilson who stood against John Swinney in the SNP leadership contest in 2003. He has been critical of the direction of the SNP since becoming an MSP, believing they are being dragged into the political centre away from their traditional left-of-centre position. He also believes the party is not vociferous enough in its advocation of Scottish independence.

He was suspended from the Scottish National Party on 25 April 2004 after making repeated public criticism of John Swinney, and was expelled from the SNP on 10 July 2004, soon after Swinney had resigned.

After becoming an independent MSP, Campbell Martin played a prominent role in fighting a number of decisions taken by Labour-led North Ayrshire Council. He has also continued his opposition to what he considers to be the centre-right re-positioning of the SNP and its advocacy of a 'culture of independence' rather than national independence.

Campbell Martin stood as an independent candidate in the Cunninghame North constituency at the May 2007 Scottish Parliament Election, securing 4,423 votes (14.6%), but was not re-elected.

In August 2011 he joined the Scottish Socialist Party, and on 1 October 2011 he spoke at an SSP fringe meeting in Glasgow following the STUC anti-cuts demonstration. He participated as a delegate at the SSP national conference in March 2012. He was the SSP candidate for the Ardrossan and Arran ward on North Ayrshire Council in May 2012, but he was not elected.

He has claimed that the SNP has been infiltrated by MI5 agents. Writing in pro-independence website BarrheadBoy, Martin said: "The SNP is completely compromised. It has been captured and controlled by the British state. The difference between those early days of the Scottish parliament and today, is that the British state assets in the SNP have, over the intervening years, risen through the ranks and now hold senior positions that have allowed them to influence party policies and direction, such as adopting a lack of urgency in delivering independence." He justified his claim by pointing out that intelligence services had previously infiltrated organisations like the Irish Republican Army and the National Union of Minerworkers.

== Journalism ==
Between 2007 and 2015, Campbell Martin edited the3towns.com an online local newspaper covering the three North Ayrshire towns of Ardrossan, Saltcoats and Stevenston. He is now the Creative Director of MacAulay Gibson Productions, an independent production company producing factual television programmes and business promos. He was involved in the production of The Only Game in Town, a documentary that looked at the procurement process for the North Ayrshire Schools Public Private Partnership project.

While still producing pro-independence articles for mainly online publications, Campbell Martin is no longer a member of a political party.

== Books ==
- Campbell Martin's autobiography – Was It Something I Said? (ISBN 979-8-7560-8982-0) – was published in October 2021.
- A two-book series by Campbell Martin – Outspoken – Part One (ISBN 979-8-3625-5801-7) and Outspoken – Part Two (ISBN 979-8-3625-6790-3) – covering Scottish politics, society and international affairs over the past ten years (2013–2023) were re-published in July 2023.
