= John Swinney =

First Minister of Scotland since 2024

The Right Honourable John Swinney MSP
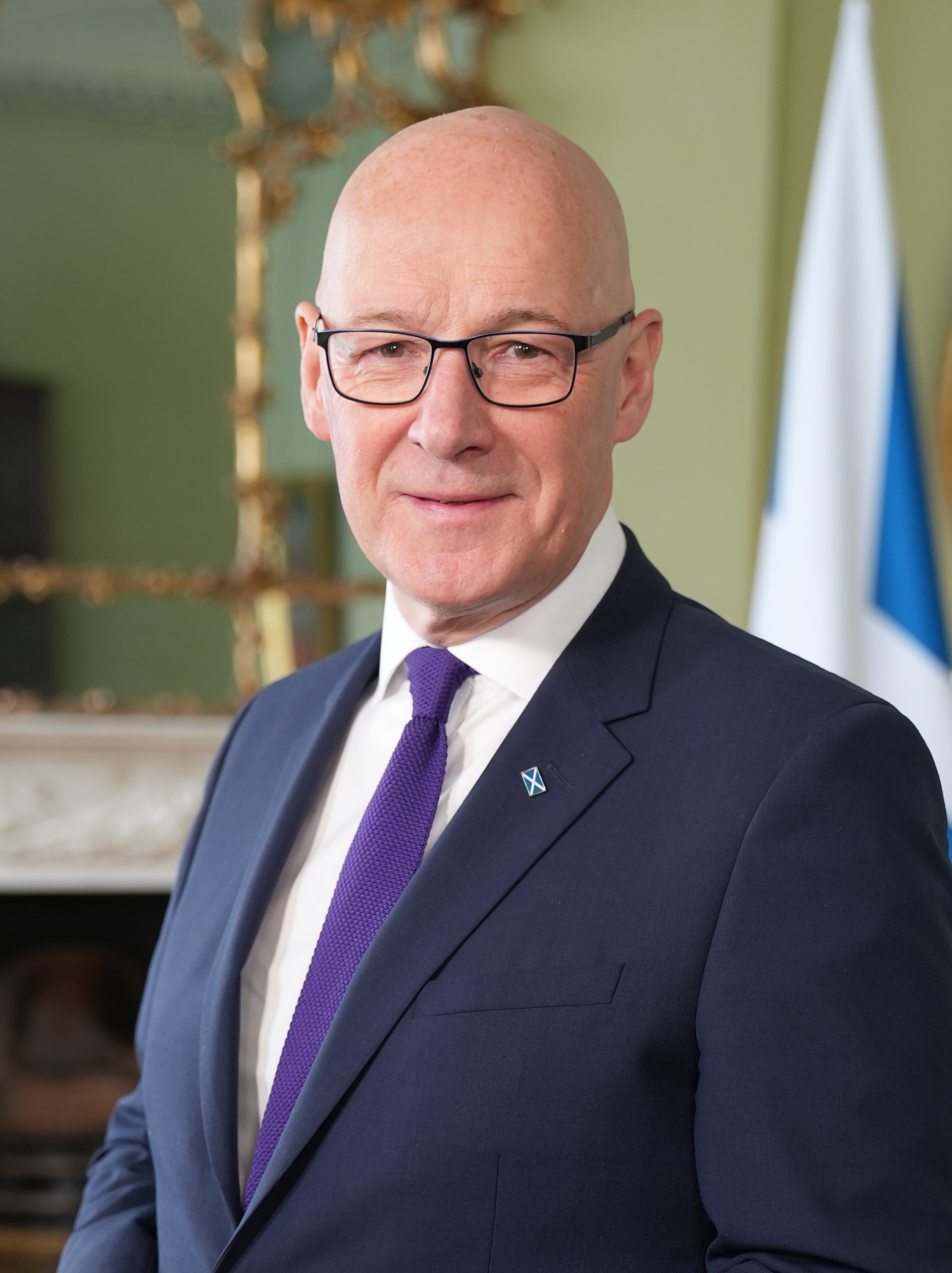
- Official portrait, 2026

First Minister of Scotland
- Incumbent
- Assumed office 8 May 2024
- Monarch: Charles III
- Deputy: Kate Forbes; Jenny Gilruth
- Preceded by: Humza Yousaf

Leader of the Scottish National Party
- Incumbent
- Assumed office 6 May 2024
- Depute: Keith Brown
- Preceded by: Humza Yousaf
- In office 26 September 2000 – 3 September 2004
- Depute: Roseanna Cunningham
- Preceded by: Alex Salmond
- Succeeded by: Alex Salmond

Deputy First Minister of Scotland
- In office 21 November 2014 – 28 March 2023
- First Minister: Nicola Sturgeon
- Preceded by: Nicola Sturgeon
- Succeeded by: Shona Robison

Depute Leader of the Scottish National Party
- In office 25 August 1998 – 26 September 2000
- Leader: Alex Salmond
- Preceded by: Allan Macartney
- Succeeded by: Roseanna Cunningham
Cabinet offices 2007–2023
Cabinet Secretary for Finance and the Economy (Note: Previously titled Cabinet Secretary for Finance and Sustainable Growth from 2007 to 2011; Cabinet Secretary for Finance, Employment and Sustainable Growth from 2011 to 2014; and Cabinet Secretary for Finance, Constitution and Economy from 2014 to 2016)
Acting (Note: Swinney was acting Cabinet Secretary for Finance and the Economy during the maternity leave of Kate Forbes from 2022 to 2023.); 16 July 2022 – 28 March 2023
First Minister	Nicola Sturgeon
Preceded by	Kate Forbes
Succeeded by	Shona Robison (Finance); Neil Gray (Wellbeing Economy, Fair Work and Energy)
In office 17 May 2007 – 18 May 2016
First Minister	Alex Salmond; Nicola Sturgeon
Preceded by	Tom McCabe
Succeeded by	Derek Mackay (Finance); Keith Brown (Economy)
Cabinet Secretary for Covid Recovery
In office 18 May 2021 – 28 March 2023
First Minister	Nicola Sturgeon
Preceded by	Office established
Succeeded by	Office abolished
Cabinet Secretary for Education and Skills
In office 18 May 2016 – 18 May 2021
First Minister	Nicola Sturgeon
Preceded by	Angela Constance (Education); Roseanna Cunningham (Skills)
Succeeded by	Shirley-Anne Somerville
Opposition portfolios
SNP Shadow portfolios
2005–2007	Finance and Public Services
1999–2000	Enterprise and Lifelong Learning
Parliamentary offices
Member of the Scottish Parliament for Perthshire North North Tayside (1999–2011)
Incumbent
Assumed office 6 May 1999
Preceded by	Constituency established
Majority	6,243 (17.0%)
Member of Parliament for North Tayside
In office 1 May 1997 – 14 May 2001
Preceded by	Bill Walker
Succeeded by	Pete Wishart

Personal details
- Born: John Ramsay Swinney; 13 April 1964 (age 62) Edinburgh, Scotland
- Party: Scottish National Party
- Spouses: Lorna King (m. 1991; div. 2000) Elizabeth Quigley (m. 2003)
- Children: 3
- Relatives: Tom Hunter (uncle)
- Education: University of Edinburgh (MA)
- Website: www.johnswinney.scot First Minister of Scotland

John Ramsay Swinney (born 13 April 1964) is a Scottish politician who has served as First Minister of Scotland since 2024. Swinney has served as Leader of the Scottish National Party (SNP) since 2024, and previously between 2000 and 2004. He has served as Member of the Scottish Parliament (MSP) for Perthshire North, previously North Tayside, since 1999, and was Member of Parliament (MP) for North Tayside from 1997 to 2001.

Born in Edinburgh, Swinney graduated with a MA in politics at the University of Edinburgh. He joined the SNP at 15 years of age, and quickly rose to prominence by serving as the National Secretary from 1986 to 1992 and as Deputy Leader from 1998 to 2000. He served in the House of Commons as MP for North Tayside from 1997 to 2001. He was elected to the inaugural Scottish Parliament at the 1999 Scottish Parliament election. After Salmond resigned the party leadership in 2000, Swinney was elected at the 2000 leadership election. He became leader of the largest opposition party in the Scottish Parliament. The SNP lost one MP at the 2001 general election and eight MSPs at the 2003 Scottish Parliament election, despite the Officegate scandal unseating the previous Scottish Labour first minister, Henry McLeish. However, the only parties to gain seats in that election were the Scottish Greens and the Scottish Socialist Party (SSP) which, like the SNP, have supported independence. After an unsuccessful challenge to his leadership in 2003, and the party's unfavourable results at the 2004 European Parliament election, Swinney resigned. Salmond returned to the role at the subsequent 2004 leadership election.

From 2004 to 2007, Swinney was a backbencher. At the 2007 Scottish Parliament election, the SNP won the highest number of seats, and Salmond was subsequently appointed first minister. Swinney served under Salmond as Cabinet Secretary for Finance, Employment and Sustainable Growth from 2007 to 2014. After Sturgeon succeeded Salmond, she appointed Swinney as Deputy First Minister in 2014. He also served as Cabinet Secretary for Finance, Constitution and Economy, until that role was divided into two posts in the second Sturgeon government as a result of the expansion of the Scottish Parliament's financial powers; he was then appointed Cabinet Secretary for Education and Skills in 2016, and then as Cabinet Secretary for Covid Recovery in 2021. On 25 May 2022, Swinney became the longest serving Deputy First Minister, surpassing the previous record which was held by Sturgeon. Swinney served as Acting Finance and Economy Secretary in addition to his position of Covid Recovery Secretary from July 2022 to March 2023. In March 2023, he resigned from his senior positions in response to Sturgeon's resignation as first minister.

Swinney spent the duration of Humza Yousaf's premiership on the backbenches and served as a member of the Scottish Parliament's Justice Committee. Following Yousaf's resignation in April 2024, Swinney ran to succeed him at the 2024 SNP leadership election and was elected unopposed. His early premiership saw the SNP lose 39 seats at the 2024 United Kingdom general election, reducing the SNP to the second-largest party in Scotland and the fourth-largest party in the Westminster Parliament. At the 2026 Scottish Parliament election, the SNP under Swinney's leadership lost votes and seats but remained the largest party in the Scottish Parliament.

== Early life ==
John Ramsay Swinney was born on 13 April 1964 in the Western General Hospital, Edinburgh, the son of Kenneth Swinney, a garage manager, and Agnes Weir Swinney (née Hunter), a Sunday school teacher. He grew up in the Corstorphine area of Edinburgh. His uncle Tom Hunter was awarded the Victoria Cross whilst serving with the Royal Marines during the Second World War. His maternal grandparents, Ramsey and Mary Hunter, were from England, having moved to Edinburgh in the 1920s.

Swinney was educated at Forrester High School, before attending the University of Edinburgh, where he received an undergraduate Master of Arts Honours degree in politics in 1986. He was a research officer for the Scottish Coal Project from 1987 to 1988, a senior management consultant with Development Options from 1988 to 1992, and a strategic planning principal with Scottish Amicable Life Assurance from 1992 to 1997.

== Early political career ==
=== Early involvement ===
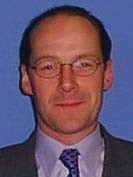
Swinney's official parliamentary portrait, 1999

Swinney joined the Scottish National Party (SNP) in 1979 at the age of 15, citing his anger at the way in which Scotland had been portrayed by television commentators at the Commonwealth Games. He became a prominent figure in the party's youth wing, the Young Scottish Nationalists (YSN), now known as the Young Scots for Independence (YSI). He served as the SNP's Assistant National Secretary, before becoming the National Secretary in 1986, at the age of 22.

=== House of Commons ===
At the 1997 general election, he was elected as Member of Parliament (MP) for the North Tayside constituency, and in 1999 he was elected to represent the same area at the Scottish Parliament. He stood down as a Westminster MP at the 2001 general election in order to avoid splitting his time, in line with all of his colleagues who found themselves in a similar dual mandate position.

=== Election to Holyrood ===
In 1999 Swinney was elected to the 1st Scottish Parliament, representing the North Tayside constituency. In Salmond's opposition cabinet, he served as the Spokesman on Enterprise and Lifelong Learning. He also served on the Parliament's Finance Committee and was the Convener of the Enterprise and Lifelong Learning Committee.

== Leader of the SNP in opposition (2000–2004) ==
=== 2000 Leadership bid ===
In 2000 Alex Salmond resigned as leader of the SNP, which triggered a leadership contest. Swinney ran in the election against Alex Neil. The leadership contest was dominated by internal fights in the party between Gradualists, who advocated Scottish devolution as step towards independence, and Fundamentalists, who were suspicious of devolution and supported a more radical approach. Swinney represented the gradualist wing and Neil represented the fundamentalists wing. Whilst both candidates supported the position of the SNP on the centre-left, Neil was seen as the more left-wing of the two, and individuals associated with the Neil campaign argued that a Swinney leadership would drag the SNP to the right.

Swinney won an overwhelming majority of votes by party delegates, securing 67.1% of votes. He was appointed leader at the party's conference on 16 September 2000. Roseanna Cunningham, who endorsed Swinney in the leadership race, was elected Depute Leader.

=== Tenure ===
==== Internal party divisions ====
Swinney's leadership quickly came under challenge. His subdued style of debating technique was often contrasted with that of his more charismatic predecessor. In 2002 Dorothy-Grace Elder, the SNP MSP for the Glasgow region, resigned her party membership after coming dissatisfied with the leadership of the SNP. She sat as an independent MSP, but Swinney called for her resignation, describing her actions as a "flout [of] the democratic will of the people of Glasgow". Margo MacDonald, a fundamentalist within the SNP, voiced her lack of confidence in Swinney's leadership. MacDonald was placed fifth in the Lothians region for the 2003 Parliament election in the SNP's candidate selection, effectively ending her chances of being re-elected as an SNP MSP. In protest, she ran instead as an independent candidate and was later expelled from the party.

In 2003 a former parliamentary candidate and a party activist in the Shetland Islands Brian Nugent formed his own pro-independence party, the Scottish Party, which eventually relaunched itself as the Free Scotland Party, in response to what he perceived to be an overly pro-EU stance by the SNP.

==== 2001 UK and 2003 Scottish elections ====
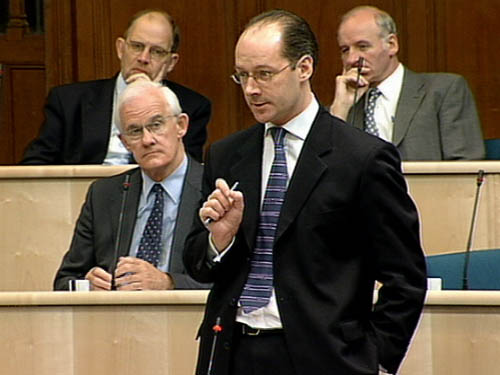
Swinney speaking in a Scottish Parliament debate, June 2000

Swinney led the SNP through a poor election result at the 2001 UK General election. The party failed to take any of their target seats and saw the loss of one of their MPs, reducing their representation at Westminster from six to five. In the Perth constituency, the Scottish Conservatives were 50 votes behind the SNP. Although the SNP's vote share remained the second-largest party, behind Labour, their vote share fell by 2%. Swinney's predecessor, Salmond, stated "consolidating as the second party in Scotland is no mean achievement" and highlighted it put the SNP in a good position for the upcoming Scottish Parliament election in 2003. Following the results of the election, Swinney admitted there were "lessons to learn" and ensured the SNP would be the "principal opposition party in Scottish politics".

In the 2003 election, the SNP performed poorly in yet another election, with the party's vote share dropping by 4.9%. They lost eight of their seats they had gained in the previous election under the leadership of Salmond. Despite a poor result, this was also mirrored by the Scottish Labour Party, who lost six MSPs and their vote share dropped by 4.2%. The SNP remained the second-largest party at Holyrood. The decline in support for the SNP was viewed by some as a rejection of the case for Scottish independence, however, the only parties which increased their representation in that election were the Scottish Socialist Party (SSP) and the Scottish Green Party, both of which also support independence.

==== 2003 leadership challenge ====
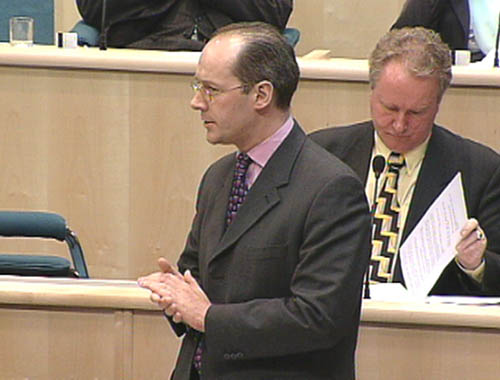
Swinney in the Scottish Parliament, April 2000

Following the results of the 2003 Scottish Parliament election, Bill Wilson, a party activist, became convinced that a change of direction was needed by the SNP leadership. After discussing this with various SNP members, he was persuaded to contest the leadership himself and launched a challenge against Swinney. Wilson ran a campaign attacking Swinney's proposals for party reform, which he claimed would centralise power and impoverish local branches. Wilson also challenged Swinney to a series of debates, although Swinney refused to take part.

The election was yet another fight between the party's fundamentalists and gradualists, with Wilson attacking Swinney's proposal for a referendum on independence before pursuing negotiations with the British government. Wilson argued that as soon as the SNP can form a government it should pursue negotiations to end the union.

The election was held at the party's 69th annual conference, and saw Swinney winning a massive victory over Wilson. Moves in support of Wilson's proposition of pursuing independence negotiations without a referendum were thrown out at the party conference, and Swinney won significant policy battles over imposing a monthly levy on party MPs, MSPs, and MEPs. In a surprise result, the new central membership system was also approved. The membership changes had been a key issue of attack from Wilson. Soon afterwards, the party's National Executive Committee decided to suspend and then expel Campbell Martin. He had backed Wilson's leadership challenge and had continued to be overtly critical of Swinney's leadership, resulting in disciplinary action. This was the last SNP election to use the delegate voting method. Future elections would be based on a one-person-one-vote postal vote system.

==== Scottish independence ====
In September 2003 he urged SNP activists to ask the public, "Do you want independence, yes or no? And then tell the Brits to get off." A spokesman for Scottish Labour condemned Swinney's use of language and said, "There is no place in Scotland for his brand of extreme nationalism."

==== 2004 European Parliament elections ====
Though retaining its two seats at the 2004 European elections, in a smaller field of 7 (Scotland up until then had 8 MEPs) the Scottish press and certain elements within the fundamentalist wing of the Party depicted the result as a disaster for the SNP putting further pressure on Swinney to resign.

=== Resignation ===
Following the results of the 2004 European Parliament election, senior figures within the SNP began privately briefing against Swinney. Gil Paterson, a former MSP for Central Scotland, was the first to call for Swinney's departure, with Michael Russell, a former potential campaign manager for Swinney calling for a change in approach from the SNP. Members of the SNP shadow cabinet began privately discussing removing Swinney from the leadership, and Alex Salmond advised Swinney to resign in exchange for senior party figures not calling openly for his resignation. On 22 June 2004, Swinney resigned as leader of the Scottish National Party, triggering a leadership contest. He was succeeded by Alex Salmond after winning more than 75% of votes against Roseanna Cunningham and Michael Russell on a joint leadership ticket with Nicola Sturgeon.

=== Backbench MSP (2004–2007) ===
From 2004 until the 2007 Scottish Parliament election, Swinney sat on the SNP's opposition backbenches. He served as a convener on the Parliament's European and External Relations Committee from 2004 to 2005 and deputy convener on the Finance Committee from 2005 to 2007. Swinney was a substitute member of the Audit Committee from 2004 to 2007. In September 2005, Swinney was made Shadow Minister for Finance.

== Salmond government (2007–2014) ==
=== Finance Secretary: 2007–2016 ===
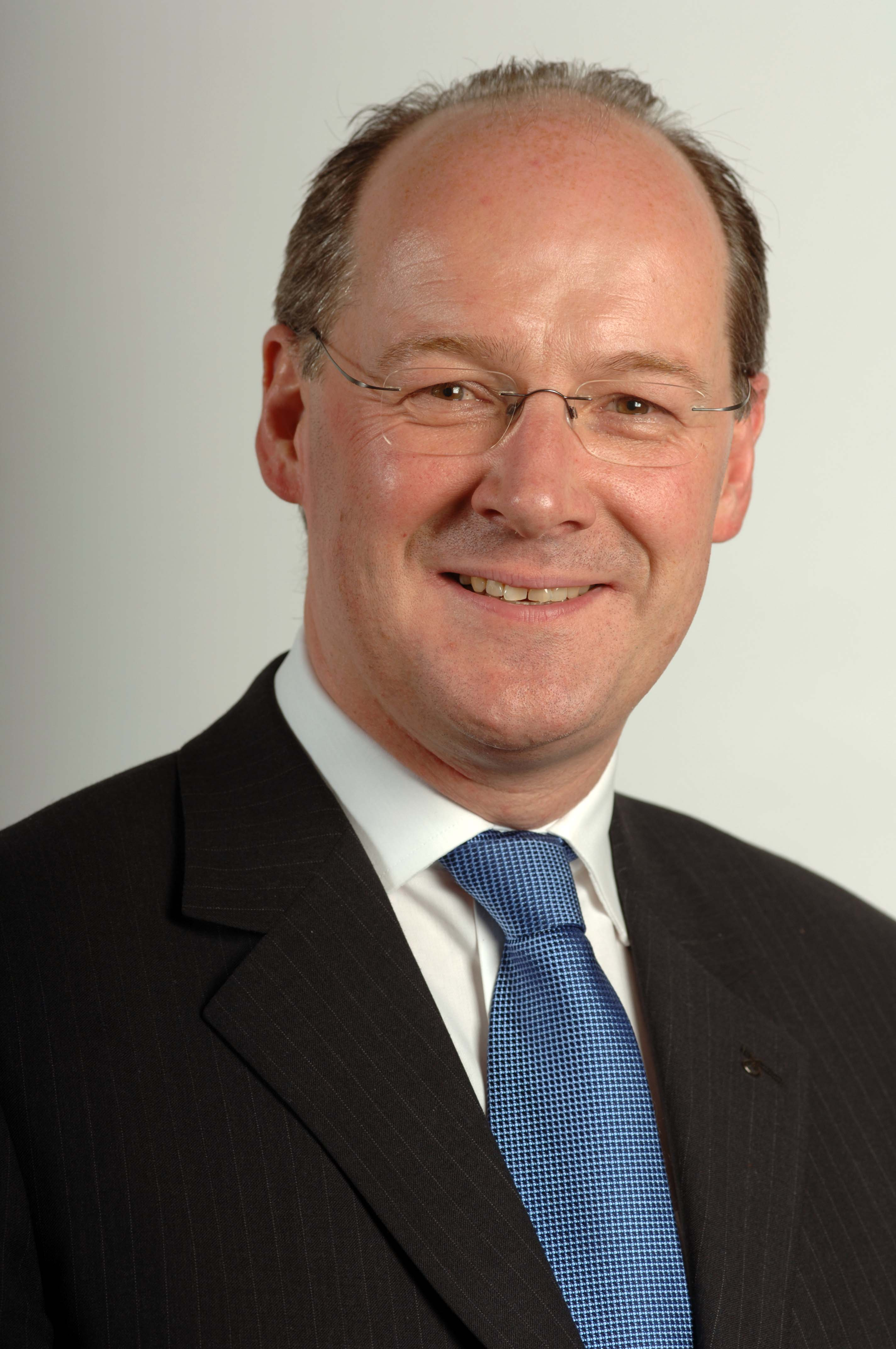
Swinney's official portrait as Cabinet Secretary for Sustainable Growth

In the 2007 election to the 3rd Scottish Parliament, the SNP emerged as the largest party, with one seat more than the governing Scottish Labour. Initially the SNP proposed coalition talks with the Scottish Liberal Democrats, however, they declined and instead Swinney led coalition talks with the Scottish Greens. After an agreement, Salmond was appointed first minister of Scotland and he appointed Swinney as the Cabinet Secretary for Finance and Sustainable Growth in his first minority government.

As response to Swinney not notifying the Scottish Parliament that he had let the Scottish Variable Rate lapse due to not funding this tax mechanism, the Scottish Parliament voted to censure him and called his actions "an abuse of power". Subsequently, a freedom of information request showed that even if Swinney had funded the mechanism, problems and delays in the HM Revenue & Customs computer system made any collection of the tax impossible. The Scottish Government added, "The power has not lapsed, the HMRC simply does not have an IT system capable of delivering a ten-month state of readiness."

==== 2008 financial crisis ====
As Finance Secretary, Swinney was faced with the 2008 financial crisis, which resulted in the Scottish economy entering recession. The Scottish economy began to gradually slow in 2007 as a result of stock market concerns regarding the U.S. housing market. Scottish economic output fell for four consecutive quarters before a slight recovery in Q3 in 2009, before falling again by the end of 2009. Swinney advocated that at the start of the 2008 financial crisis, the Scottish Government and Swinney as finance secretary "acted swiftly to provide an immediate capital stimulus to Scotland's economy at the start of the 2008 financial crisis. As a consequence, Scotland's experience of recession has been shorter and shallower than the rest of the UK".

==== Economic effects of Scottish independence ====
As Finance Secretary, Swinney was responsible for preparing a cabinet briefing paper on the financial impact of Scottish independence and its potential impact on public spending. Produced in 2012 during the campaign for the independence referendum to be held in 2014, the report warned that an independent Scotland would face public spending cuts, lower pensions and welfare spending, and high levels of debt. The paper indicated that an independent Scotland would face a significant budget deficit of £28 billion, and would inherit a higher proportion of the UK national debt than ministers had publicly acknowledged, with debt interest payments potentially costing taxpayers in Scotland £5.2 billion in 2016-17. The report warned that Scotland's public finances would be heavily dependent on volatile and declining oil revenues, and suggested that the affordability of the state pension in an independent Scotland would be at risk. The report further warned that the SNP's plans for an oil fund under independence would "require some downward revision in current spending."

The cabinet paper was kept secret before being leaked to the press in 2013, a year after it was drafted. Alistair Darling, the leader of the Better Together campaign opposed to Scottish independence, described the leaked report as a "hammer blow" to the SNP's economic credibility. A Scottish Government spokesman insisted that the report's findings had been "overtaken by events". In her 2025 memoir Frankly, Nicola Sturgeon, who had served as Deputy First Minister at the time, acknowledged that Swinney's leaked briefing paper had encouraged the Scottish Government to "cast the opening finances of an independent Scotland in as positive a light as possible", and admitted that government economists had been pressured to push their projections of oil revenues higher.

== Deputy First Minister of Scotland (2014–2023) ==
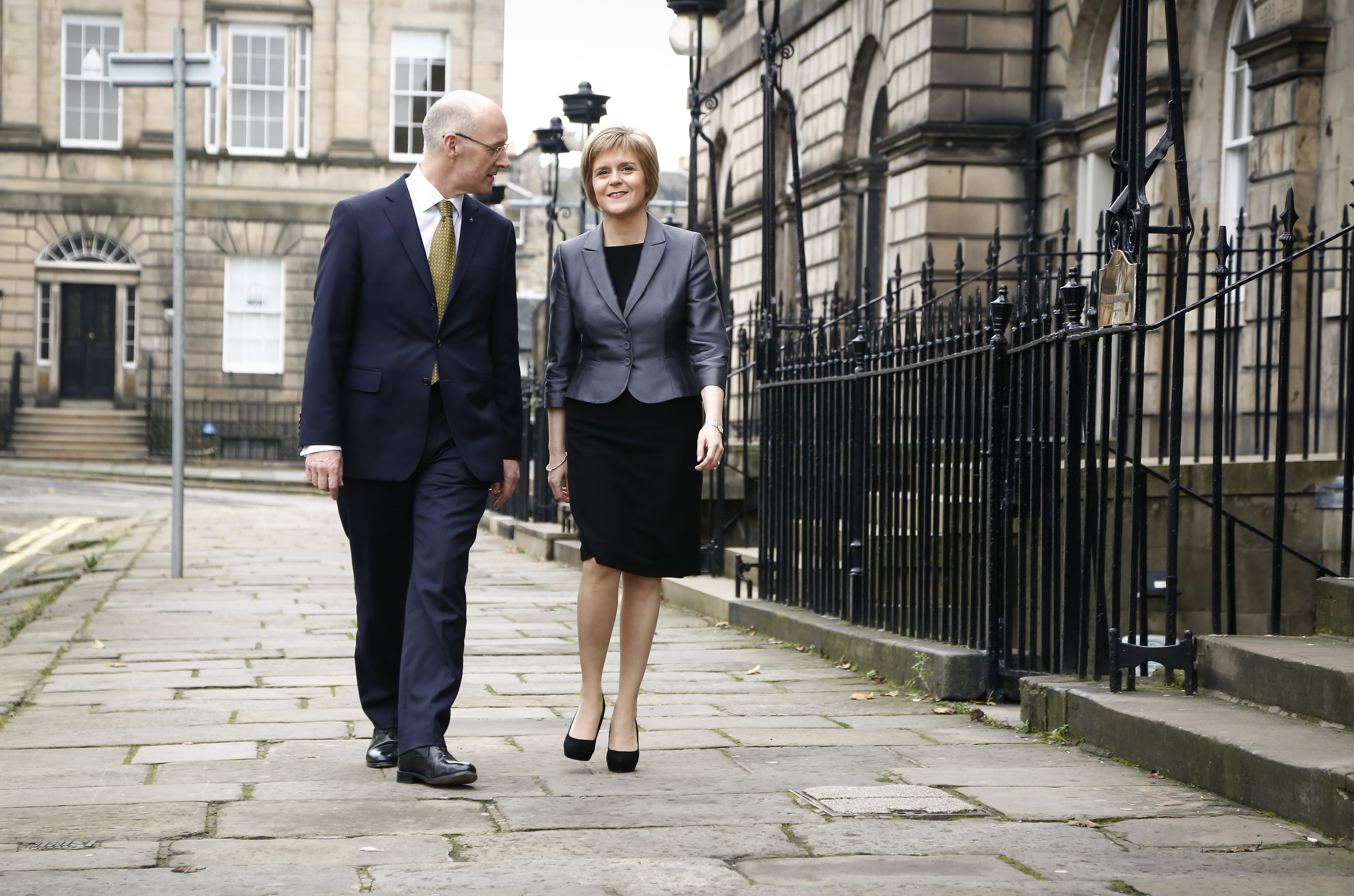
Swinney with First Minister Nicola Sturgeon after his appointment as Deputy First Minister, November 2014

Following the defeat of the Yes Scotland campaign in the 2014 referendum, Salmond resigned as leader of the SNP and Swinney was seen as a likely candidate in the leadership race, however, he "unreservedly" ruled himself out for a second bid as leader and endorsed Nicola Sturgeon. Sturgeon was elected unopposed as leader and was subsequently appointed First Minister of Scotland. On 21 November 2014, Sturgeon appointed Swinney as Deputy First Minister. He remained as Finance Secretary in Sturgeon's new cabinet.

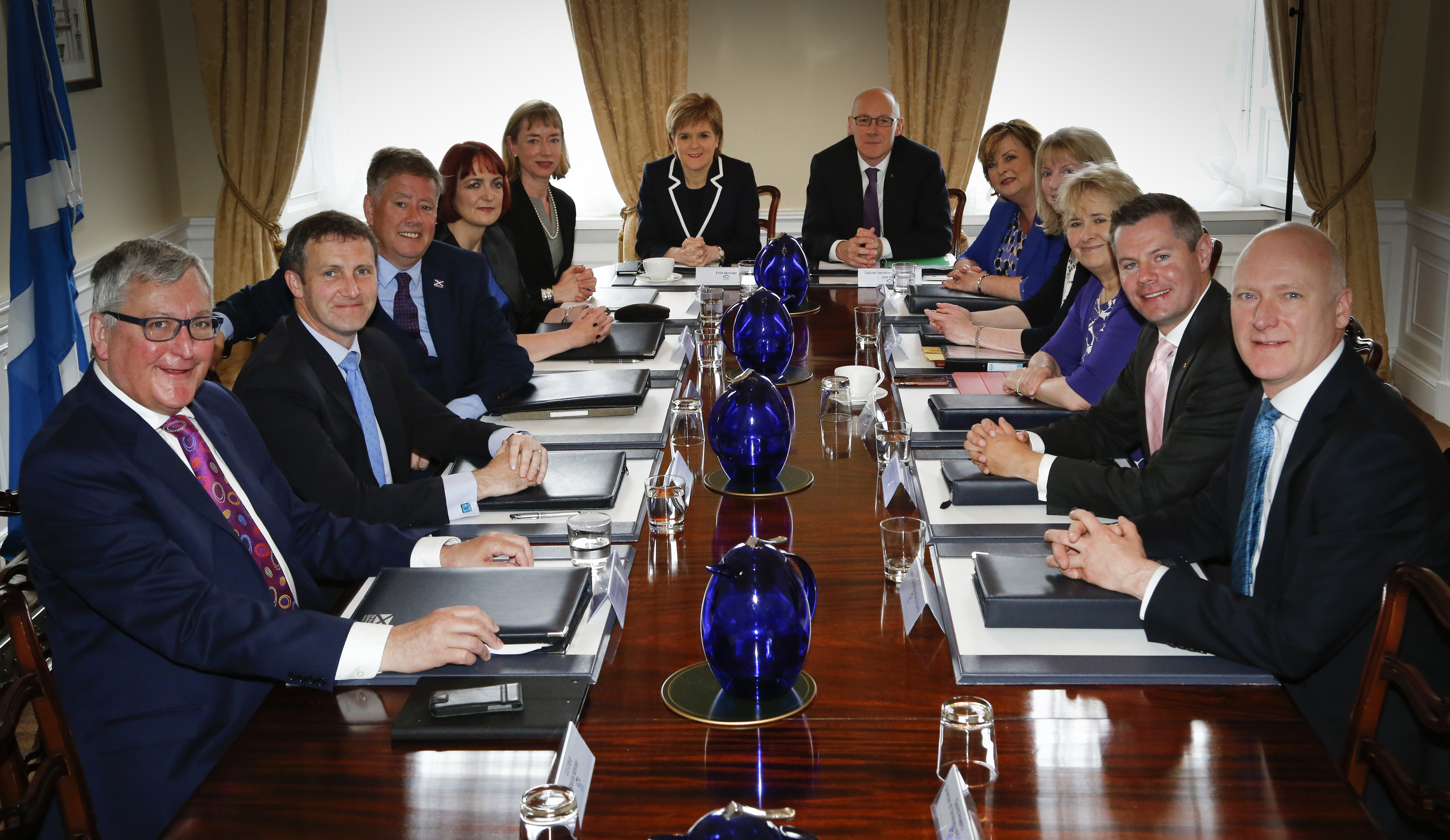
Sturgeon and Swinney head the first meeting of the Scottish Cabinet, May 2016.

=== Education Secretary: 2016–2021 ===
In the 2016 Scottish Parliament election, the SNP lost its overall majority, but remained the largest party with Sturgeon securing a second term as first minister. She reappointed Swinney as deputy first minister, and for the first time in nine years, he was reshuffled from his roles as Finance Secretary to Cabinet Secretary for Education and Skills.

==== Educational performance ====
After the 2017 United Kingdom general election saw the SNP lose 21 seats, pollster Professor John Curtice told the BBC that the party's record on education had likely dented its popularity: "The SNP may want to reflect that their domestic record, not least on schools, is beginning to undermine their support among those who on the constitutional question are still willing to support the Nationalist position."

In March 2020, after the results of Scottish students dropped in maths and science in the international PISA rankings for education, Swinney admitted, "There is progress to be made in maths and science." Scottish Conservative education spokeswoman Liz Smith said: "These two areas are so critical to the success of much of Scotland's modern economy. We should be doing so much better."

==== 2020 SQA exam controversy ====
In August 2020, Swinney was subject to a vote of no confidence in Parliament, with the Conservatives, Labour and the Liberal Democrats all accusing Swinney of creating an exam results system which "unfairly penalised pupils at schools which had historically not performed so well". During the No Confidence debate, Nicola Sturgeon described him as "one of the most decent and dedicated people in Scottish politics", while The Herald newspaper reported that: "Mr Swinney endured a deeply uncomfortable hour in the Holyrood chamber, as opposition MSPs said he had been a serial failure at the education portfolio, and he knew it." The motion was defeated by 67 votes to 58 resulting in Swinney surviving the vote and remaining as Scottish Education Secretary.

==== Vote of no confidence ====
In March 2021 Swinney was the subject of a second motion of no confidence. As the minister in charge of liaising with the Committee on the Scottish Government Handling of Harassment Complaints, Swinney was criticised for failing to provide the committee with all of the legal documentation which they requested. After two votes in Parliament failed to persuade him to publish the advice, opposition parties moved a motion of no confidence in him. After, Swinney shared some of these documents with the committee, the Scottish Greens declared they would not support the motion of no confidence and it was defeated by 65 votes to 57.

==== Attainment gap ====
A report by Audit Scotland in March 2021 concluded that the results of Swinney's efforts to reduce the poverty related attainment gap in Scottish education were "limited and [fell] short of the Scottish Government's aims. Improvement needs to happen more quickly and there needs to be greater consistency across the country." In 10 Scottish council areas the attainment gap between the richest and the poorest children increased.

=== Covid Recovery Secretary: 2021–2023 ===
Following the 2021 Scottish Parliament election, Scottish Labour urged Sturgeon to replace Swinney as Cabinet Secretary for Education, citing what it called "a litany of failures", in the "hope a new minister can stop the rot." On 18 May, Sturgeon retained Swinney as Deputy First Minister but reshuffled him to the new cabinet role as Cabinet Secretary for Covid Recovery. Swinney also served as Acting Cabinet Secretary for Finance and the Economy from July 2022, whilst Kate Forbes was on maternity leave.

Following Sturgeon's resignation in February 2023, Swinney stood down from his position as Deputy First Minister on 2 March 2023. He stated that it had been an "honour to serve Scotland". In March 2023, Swinney moved to the SNP's backbenches and served as a member of the Scottish Parliament's Justice Committee. He spent the duration of Humza Yousaf's premiership on the backbenches.

== First Minister of Scotland (2024–present) ==
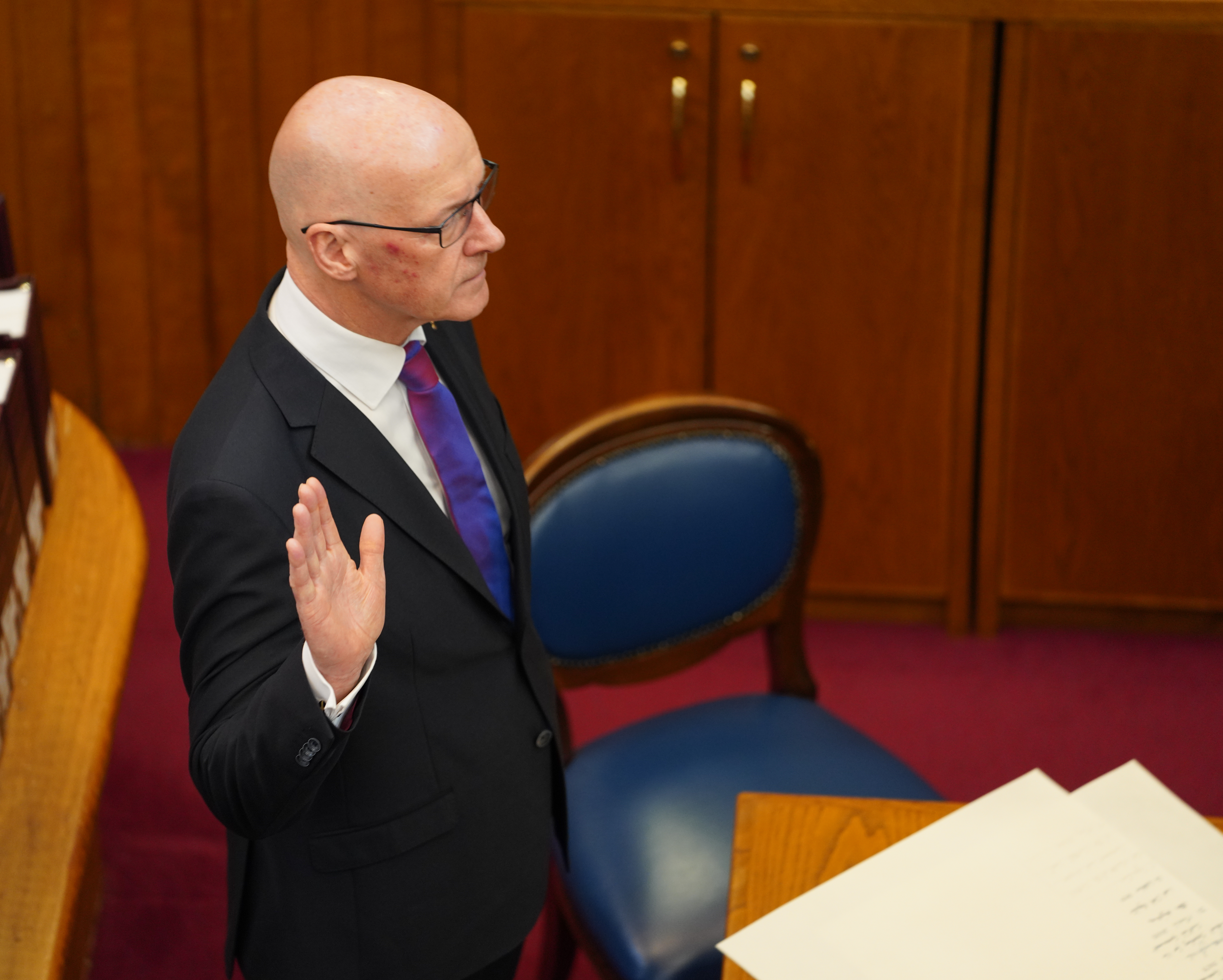
Swinney taking the Oath of Office at the Court of Session in Edinburgh, May 2024

=== 2024 leadership bid ===
Following Yousaf's resignation in April 2024 amid a government crisis, Swinney launched his leadership bid on 2 May, after Kate Forbes, who was a serious contender to become leader, dropped out and endorsed him. On 30 April, Forbes and Swinney held meetings to discuss the leadership. Swinney promised Forbes a significant role in his government if elected, and Forbes soon after stood down. Following Swinney's election, Forbes was appointed Deputy First Minister and Cabinet Secretary for Economy and Gaelic.

Graeme McCormick challenged Swinney for the leadership, saying he had the 100 nominations on 5 May. Just hours later, he withdrew and endorsed Swinney, who became the presumptive nominee.

On 6 May, with no other candidates put forward, Swinney was elected as party leader unopposed. He said that he would work with Scottish unionists as leader.

=== First term (2024–2026) ===
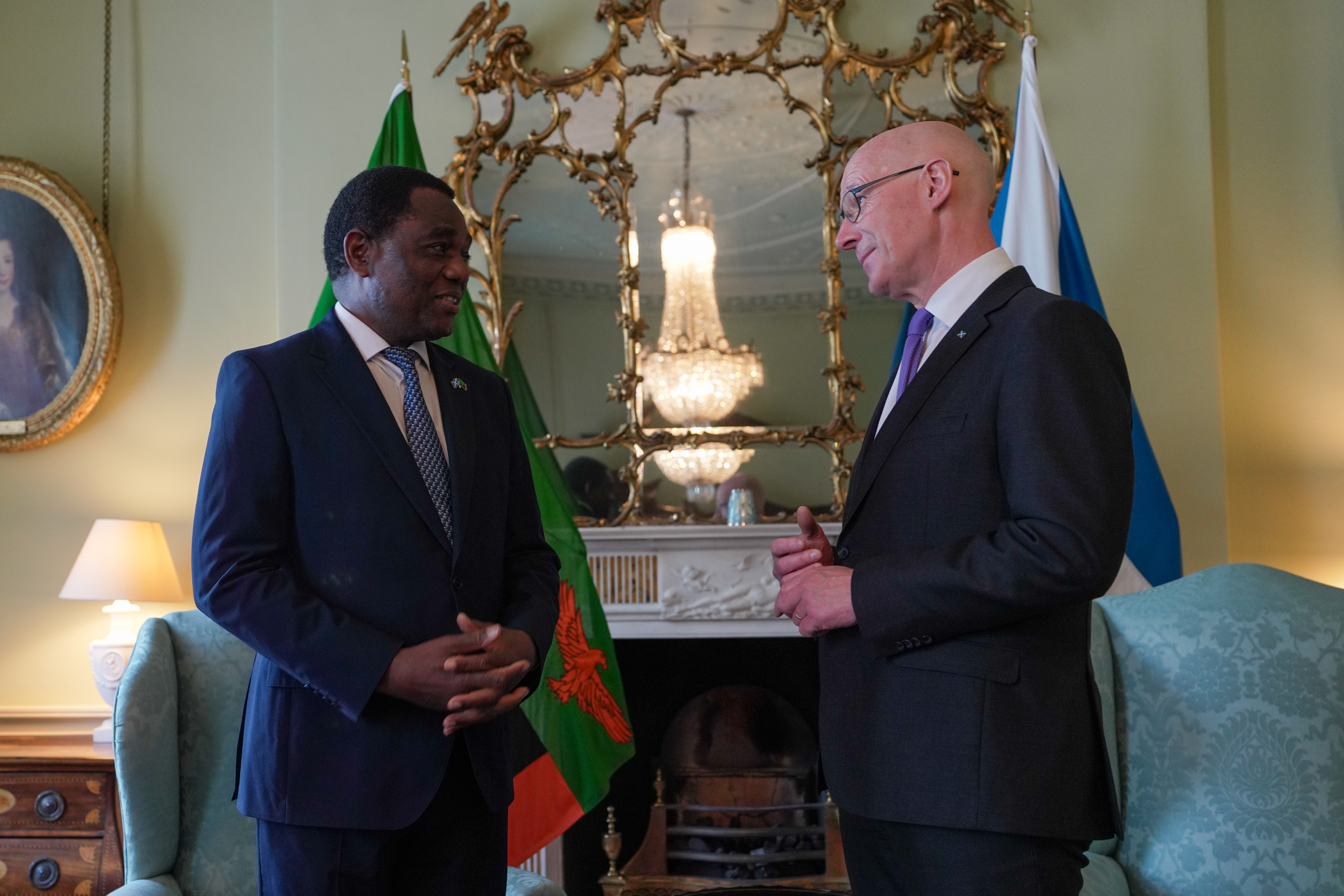
Swinney meets with President of Zambia Hakainde Hichilema at Bute House, June 2024.

Swinney was officially sworn into office as first minister of Scotland on 8 May 2024 at the Court of Session in Edinburgh after receiving the Royal Warrant of Appointment by King Charles III.

Swinney's early premiership was marked by the resolution of the Michael Matheson iPad scandal: the SNP MSP Michael Matheson had incurred a £11,000 bill after taking a Parliamentary iPad while on a family holiday, and had attempted to claim the bill back on expenses before admitting that the iPad had not been used for work purposes. Swinney refused to support the Standards, Procedures and Public Appointments Committee's proposed sanction on Matheson, describing Matheson as a "friend and colleague" who had "made mistakes", and casting doubt on the integrity of the committee's process: describing the process as "prejudiced", Swinney claimed that Conservative MSP Annie Wells should have removed herself from the committee due to previous comments about Matheson's conduct. Swinney's support for Matheson was described as "incredible and indefensible" by the Scottish Conservatives leader Douglas Ross, and "unbelievable and embarrassing" by the Scottish Labour leader Anas Sarwar. Swinney directed the SNP to abstain on the parliamentary vote on the committee's recommendations, after introducing an amendment re-iterating Swinney's complaints about the investigation into Matheson. The Scottish Parliament subsequently voted in support of the committee's proposed sanction, banning Matheson from the Scottish Parliament for 27 days and withholding his salary 54 days, the heaviest sanction ever awarded to an MSP.

==== First cabinet ====
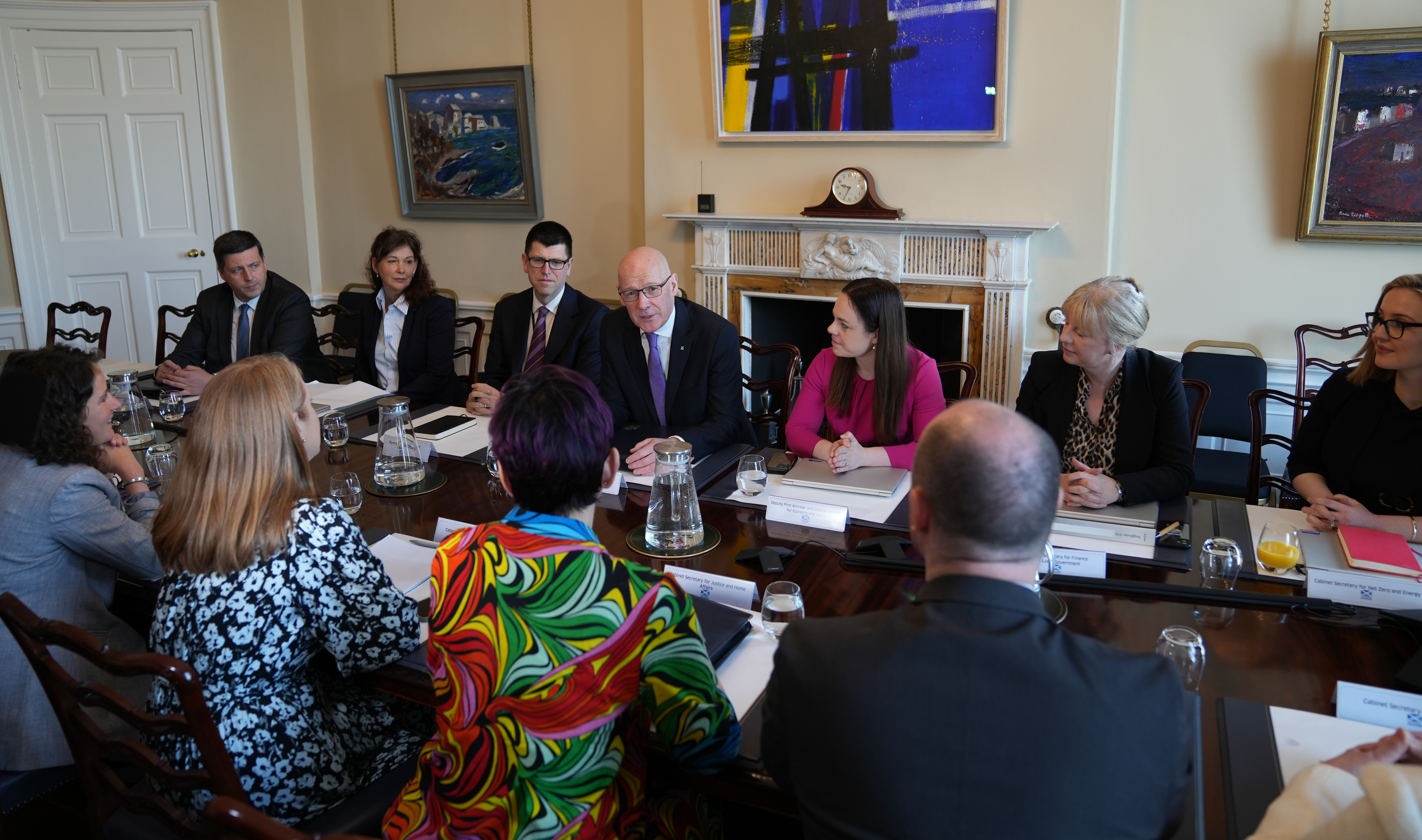
Swinney chairs the first meeting of his cabinet at Bute House, May 2024.

The majority of Swinney's cabinet were previously part of Yousaf's previous governments. The only addition to the cabinet was Kate Forbes replacing Shona Robison as Deputy First Minister of Scotland, and taking part of Màiri McAllan's responsibility for economy into her portfolio as Cabinet Secretary for Economy and Gaelic. Robison was, however, re-appointed by Swinney as Finance Secretary with additional responsibility for local government, with McAllan appointed as the reduced portfolio of Cabinet Secretary for Net Zero and Energy.

On 27 March 2025, Christina McKelvie, the Minister for Drugs and Alcohol Policy died whilst serving in office, ultimately triggering a reshuffle on Swinney's government in June 2025. Màiri McAllan was appointed as Cabinet Secretary for Housing, Gillian Martin as Cabinet Secretary for Climate Action and Energy and Tom Arthur and Maree Todd appointed as Minister for Social Care and Mental Wellbeing and Minister for Drugs & Alcohol Policy and Sport respectively.

==== Constitution ====
Swinney claimed that he believed that Scottish independence could "be achieved in the next five years" (as of May 2024) as a result of Brexit consequences on Scotland and the Scottish economy, as well as the cost of living crisis. In an interview with Sky News, Swinney said "if we look at two of the biggest issues we face as a country in Scotland; the effect of the cost of living and the implications of Brexit. Both of those are major strategic factors that are doing severe economic and social damage to Scotland because of bad decisions taken in Westminster. And independence is the answer to that".

==== Gender Reform Bill ====
Early into his premiership, Swinney faced questions from opposition parties regarding the Gender Recognition Reform (Scotland) Bill which had been introduced by Shona Robison and was blocked by the UK Government using a Section 35 order under the terms of the Scotland Act 1998. Swinney claimed that "the Supreme Court has said that we can't legislate in that area and we can't take forward that legislation".

==== 2024 UK election ====
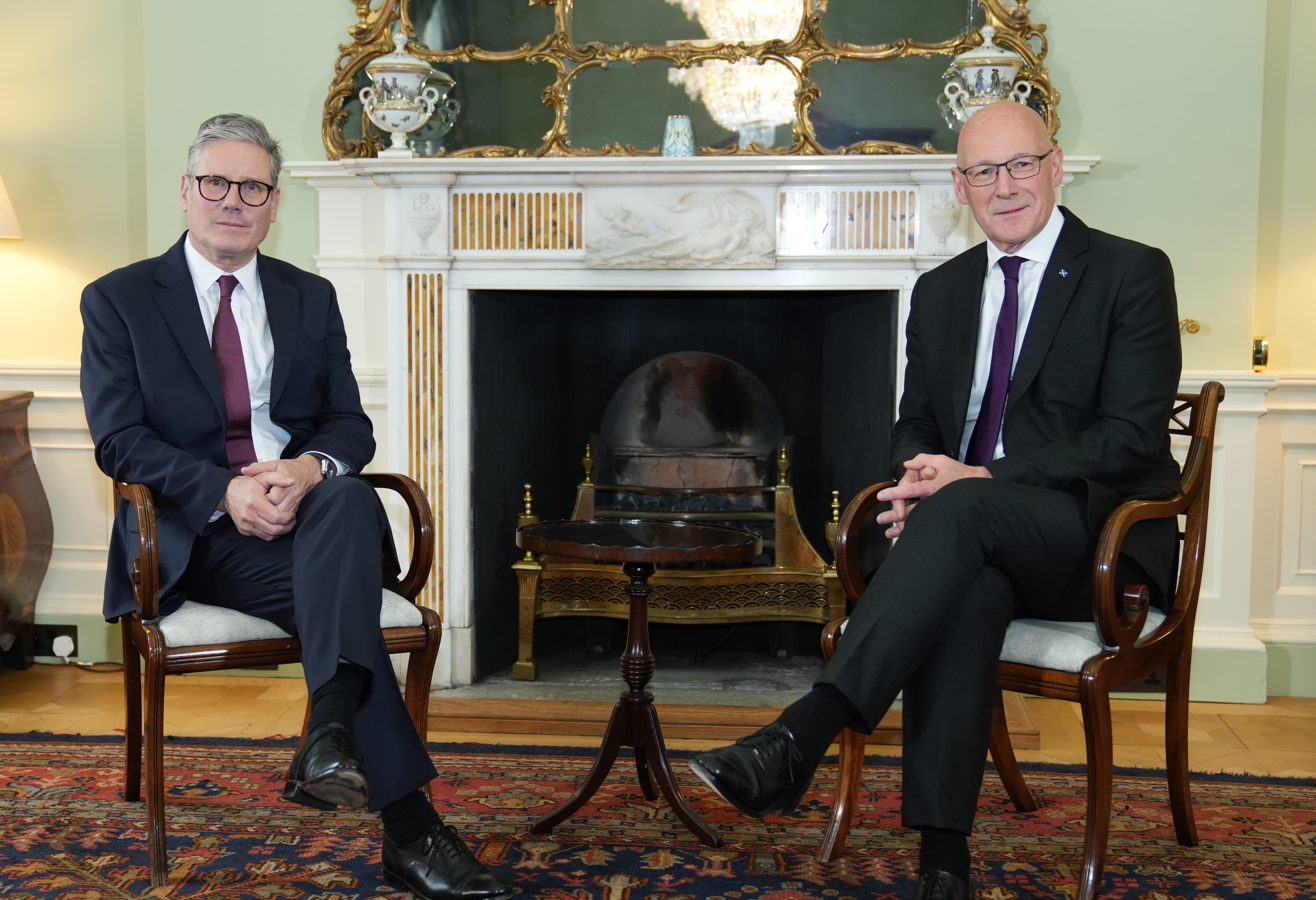
Swinney meets with then-Prime Minister of the United Kingdom, Keir Starmer, following the 2024 general election, at Bute House.

In July 2024, Swinney and his party contested all 57 Scottish seats for the 2024 general election. The SNP went into the election as the largest party at Westminster from Scotland, having won 48 out of 59 seats at the 2019 general election. Following the results of the 2024 United Kingdom general election in Scotland, the SNP became the second largest party in the UK Parliament representing Scottish seats, having won nine seats, losing a total of 39 seats across Scotland. Across the United Kingdom, the results saw a Labour Party landslide victory, and similarly in Scotland, Scottish Labour became the largest party representing Scottish constituencies at Westminster.

Following the results, Swinney said that the outcome of the election in Scotland was "very, very difficult and damaging". High-profile SNP MPs lost their seats in the election, including Kirsten Oswald, Tommy Sheppard, Alison Thewliss and Joanna Cherry. On 7 July 2024, newly elected Prime Minister of the United Kingdom Keir Starmer travelled to Edinburgh on the first stop of his tour of the four countries of the United Kingdom and met with Swinney at the official residence of the First Minister, Bute House. During the meeting, both Swinney and Starmer agreed to "work together" and to "reset the relationship between their two governments".

Apology Over 2025 Dundee Incident

Following an incident in Lochee, Dundee, in August 2025, in which a 12-year-old girl was filmed holding an axe and a knife, First Minister John Swinney criticised online claims about the incident, including comments made by Elon Musk, as misinformation, relying on information provided by Police Scotland. In June 2026, following the conviction of Ilia Belov for assaulting the girl and behaving in a threatening or abusive manner towards four girls, Swinney acknowledged that there was no reason to maintain his earlier position in light of the court proceedings. He apologised to the girl and her family, stating that his earlier comments had been based on the information available to him from Police Scotland. However, Swinney maintained that he would not apologise to Musk, whom he accused of acting in bad faith, and warned against the use of such incidents to promote division within Scottish society.

==== Storm Éowyn ====
In January 2025, the Met Office issued a rare red alert warning for strong winds for much of Scotland. Ahead of the strong winds association with Storm Éowyn, Swinney urged the public "not to travel" and urged the public to take the alert seriously and follow all advice given by emergency services in preparation for the storm. On 23 January 2025, Swinney advised that local councils across Scotland would make decisions on areas such as schools closing during the storm, and advised that the Scottish Government Resilience Room had been activated to co-ordinate the government's response and preparation for the storm. Storm Éowyn made impact in Scotland on 24 January 2025, leaving around 117,000 homes across the country without power and electricity supply, with wind speeds as high as 102 mph recorded on the Tay Road Bridge. Swinney appealed to the public to have a "high level of vigilance".

Swinney issued a public statement on 25 January calling for "patience" as the cleanup operation began. Amber warnings for ice, snow and wind remained in place in most parts of Scotland over the weekend (24–26 January). Swinney stated that it was "clear the severity of Storm Éowyn will continue into next week and this will have an impact on the speed at which utilities and local services can fully resume".

==== United States relations ====
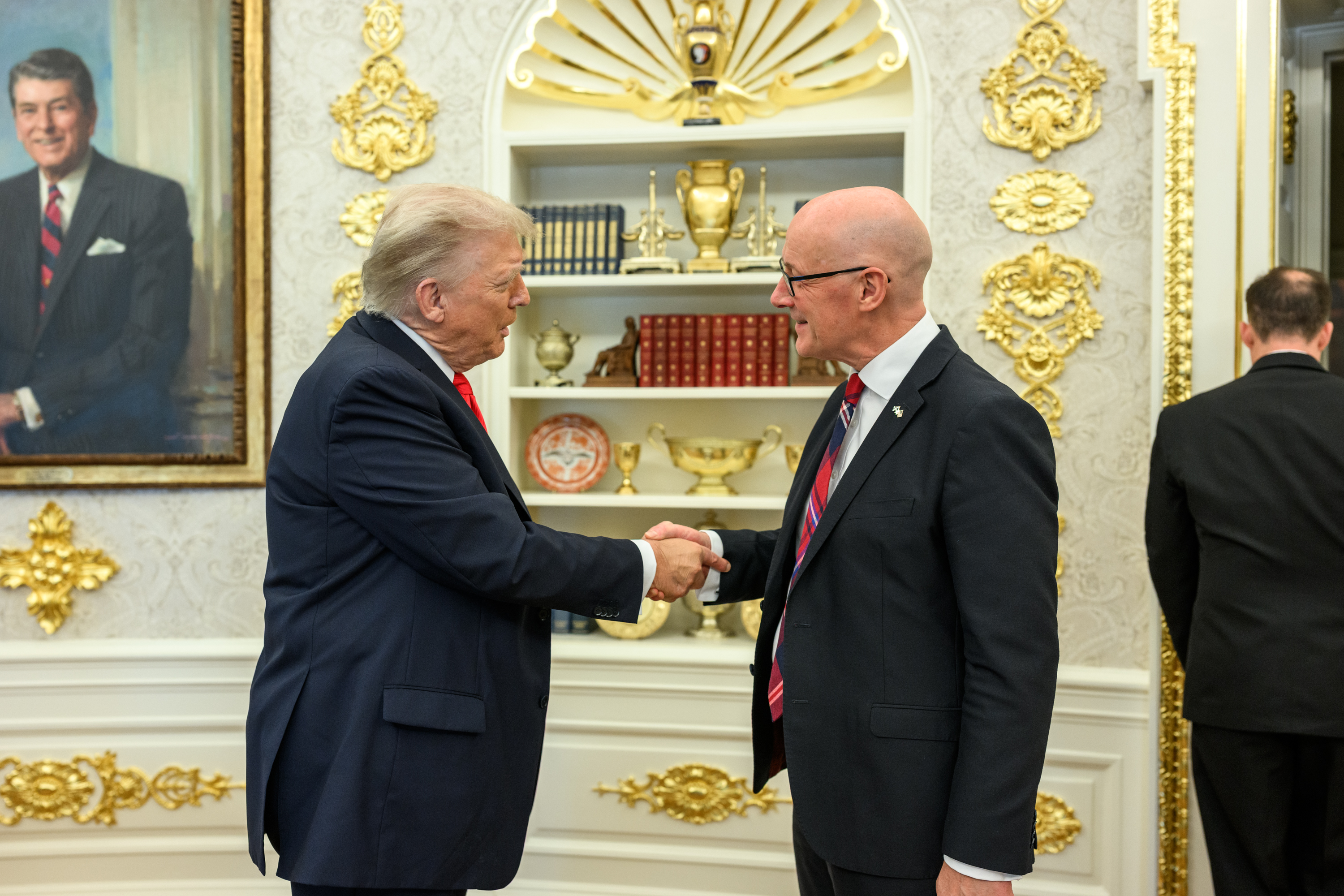
Swinney with US President Donald Trump in the Oval Office at the White House, September 2025

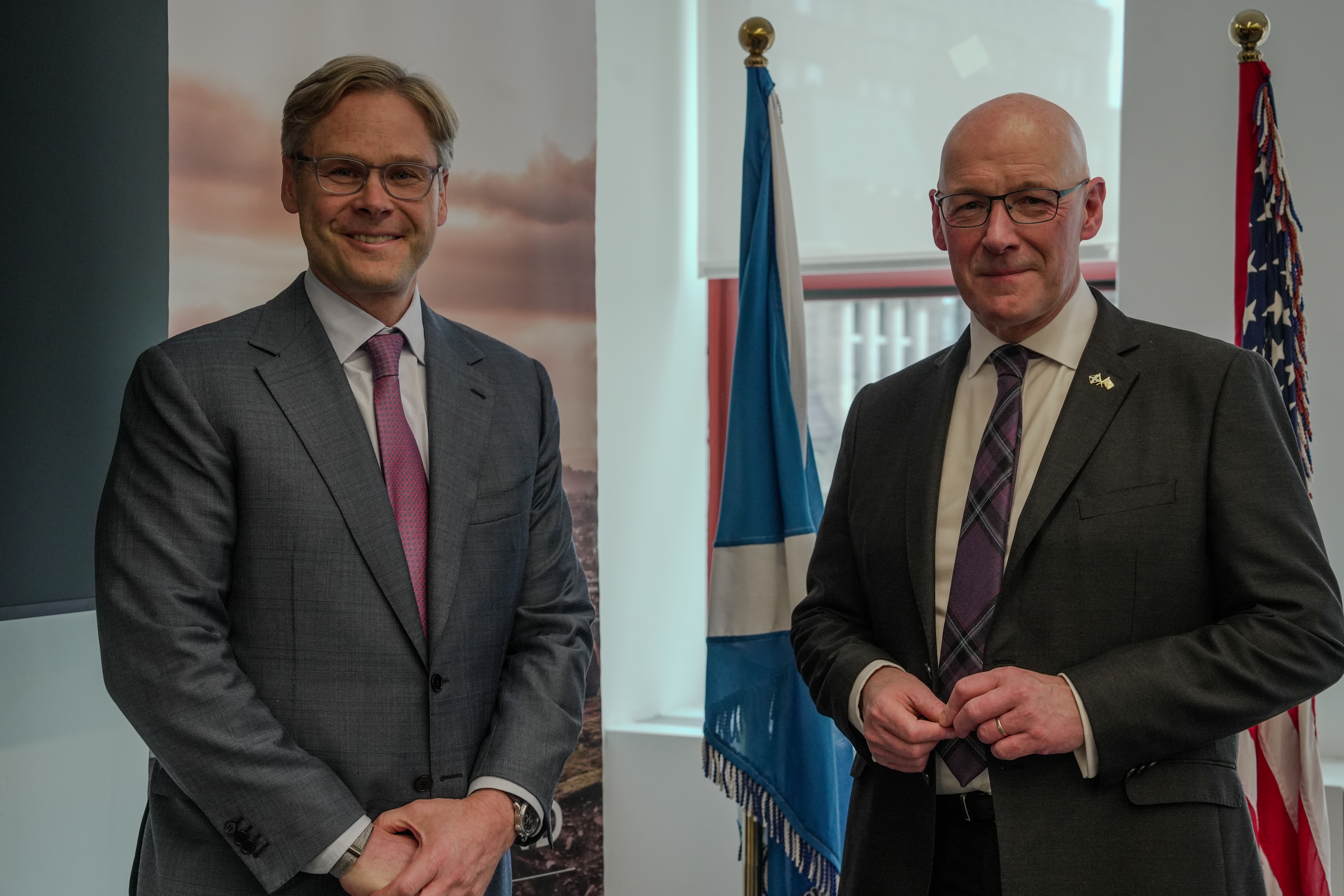
Swinney (right) during a visit to the United States, April 2025

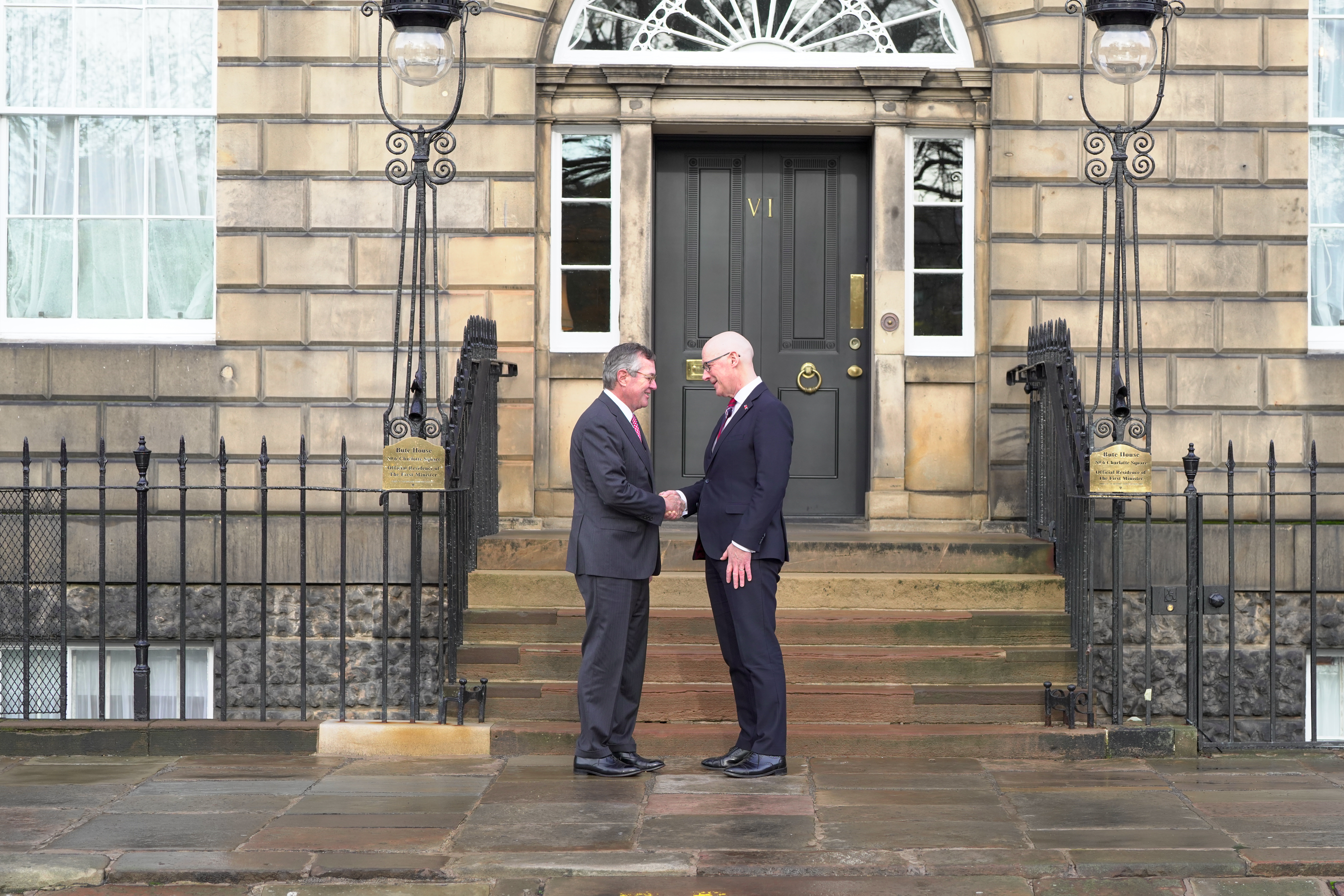
Swinney welcomes United States Ambassador, Warren Stephens, to Bute House, November 2025.

During a speech to the Munich Security Conference in February 2025, Vice President of the United States, JD Vance, criticised the Scottish Government and their policy on buffer zones outside abortion clinics. Vance told the Munich Security Conference that "in October, the Scottish Government began distributing letters to citizens whose houses lay within so-called Safe Access Zones, warning them that even private prayer within their own homes may amount to breaking the law". In response, a spokesperson for the Scottish Government branded Vance's comments as "dangerous", adding that "no letters had been sent out saying people couldn't pray in their homes", and confirmed that only "intentional or reckless behaviour" was covered by the act referred to by Vance.

In April 2025, U.S. President Donald Trump introduced a number of tariffs on foreign imports into the United States. Scottish products were affected by a 10% tariff, something in which Deputy First Minister Kate Forbes claimed would "have negative impact on Scotland's economy", whilst Swinney said that the tariffs were "very damaging" for the Scottish economy", but expressed hope for Trump's "deep personal connection to Scotland" would help avoid US trade barriers.

Swinney stated to the Scottish Parliament in April 2025 that he would "leave no stone unturned" in taking forward concerns from Scottish businesses regarding the trade tariffs, particularly concerns raised by the Scotch whisky industry. Business with the United States contributes £971 million per year for the Scotch whisky industry. Speaking about the tariffs in his first official visit to the United States since becoming First Minister, Swinney condemned Trump's tariffs, stating that "it is undeniable the advent of tariffs is a blow to Scotland". He confirmed that whilst visiting the United States, no plans were in place to meet with representatives from the Trump administration to discuss the tariffs.

Swinney met with Trump on 29 July 2025, during his five-day private visit to his golf course at Turnberry, South Ayrshire. Swinney said that he would use the talks with Trump as an opportunity to raise the "unimaginable suffering" in Gaza, as well as the 10% tariff imposed by the Trump administration on Scotch whisky. As part of the visit, Swinney pledged £180,000 of public money to support the 2025 Nexo Championship of the DP World Tour, to be held at Trump International Golf Links in Aberdeenshire. Swinney described the funding as an opportunity to "further enhance Aberdeenshire's reputation as a leading golfing destination". Swinney's pledge met with intense criticism from across the political spectrum: the Scottish Conservatives accused Swinney of hypocrisy for supporting protests against Trump's visit while giving public money to his golf course. Monica Lennon of Scottish Labour described the decision as "completely ridiculous", and accused Swinney of paying "£180,000 of our money for a five minute meet-and-greet with Donald Trump". Former SNP health secretary Alex Neil described it as "an outrageous waste of public money" that should have been "given to cash-strapped organisations providing essential services for Scotland's poor." Patrick Harvie of the Scottish Greens compared the funding to "offering up pocket money to the school bully," adding, "Scotland should be ashamed of this." Swinney also met with Trump in the Oval Office at the White House on 9 September 2025, where better tariffs on imports to the United States of Scotch whisky from Scotland were discussed, along with international conflicts in Gaza and Qatar. No reduction in whisky tariffs was forthcoming following either of Trump and Swinney's meetings.

Swinney faced strong criticism for attending a state banquet at Windsor Castle in honour of Donald Trump during his 2025 state visit to the UK: SNP MP Chris Law posted then hastily deleted a tweet saying, "Sitting at tonight's banquet dinner with President Donald Trump, is conceding that it's acceptable to support genocide in Gaza". Co-leader of the Scottish Greens Ross Greer called on Swinney to boycott the dinner, saying, "Donald Trump is one of the most dishonest, disgraced and dishonourable people in the world. He is the last person on earth who deserves a banquet in their honour." Swinney insisted that it was in Scotland's interests for him to attend the dinner, saying, "I don't think people in Scotland would understand their first minister leaving Scotland's seat empty, when there are big issues that affect the jobs and the livelihoods of people in Scotland." Northern Irish First Minister Michelle O'Neill and Welsh First Minister Eluned Morgan both refused to attend the dinner.

In April 2026, Trump announced the lifting of tariffs following a direct request from King Charles III during his state visit to the United States. Swinney’s earlier meetings with Trump in July and September 2025, in which he raised concerns about the impact of tariffs on the Scotch whisky industry, formed part of broader efforts by multiple stakeholders to bring attention to the issue. Following the announcement, Swinney and Trump held further communication, including a direct phone call, during which the tariff decision and its impact were discussed. Swinney subsequently stated that Trump had expressed appreciation for the issue being raised with him previously. Public statements issued after the exchange indicated that Trump acknowledged the discussions he had held with Swinney on Scotch whisky tariffs with Trump stating that Swinney played a “major part” in ending the tariffs on Scotch whisky.

Swinney however faced criticism for attempting to claim credit for Trump removing the tariffs when an image shared by the SNP, featuring Swinney's likeness and signature and claiming that Swinney "fought for Scotch whisky and he delivered", was widely ridiculed. The SNP's opponents accused Swinney and the SNP of having "some brass neck" for trying to claim credit for the tariff relief. Scottish Conservative MSP Murdo Fraser posted on X: "John Swinney claims credit for the discovery of penicillin, the moon landings, and Scotland qualifying for the 2026 World Cup." Scotland Secretary Douglas Alexander said that the leading role had been played by UK Government negotiators and that neither of Swinney's meetings with Trump had led to a reduction in tariffs.

==== Israel–Gaza war ====
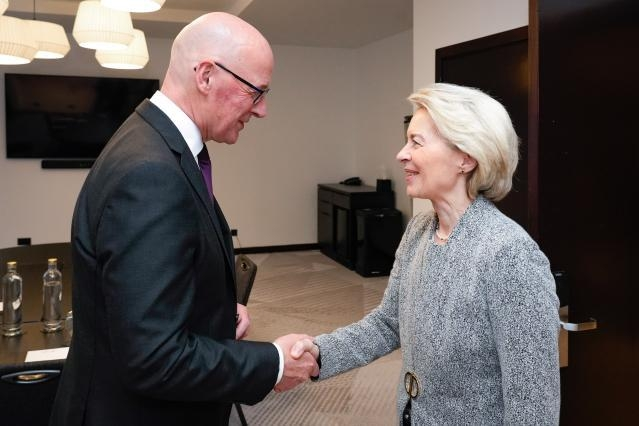
Swinney meets with President of the European Commission, Ursula von der Leyen in Glasgow, July 2025.

Swinney has called for an immediate ceasefire in the Gaza war, and for a de-escalation of the conflict between Iran and Israel. In August 2024, Swinney's Cabinet Secretary for External Affairs, Angus Robertson, faced intense criticism from within the Scottish National Party when he was photographed meeting with Daniela Grudsky Ekstein, the Deputy Ambassador of Israel to the UK. The Israeli embassy said that Grudsky Ekstein had discussed the release of Israeli hostages with Robertson, and that Israel was "looking forward to cooperating" with Scotland in areas including culture and renewables. The photograph provoked uproar within the SNP, and several SNP MSPs and former ministers called for Robertson's resignation. Swinney said that Robertson met with Grudsky Ekstein with his full knowledge and permission, and that he stood by his decision to accept the Israeli embassy's request for a meeting. Swinney defended the meeting as an opportunity to convey the Scottish Government's "consistent position on the killing and suffering of innocent civilians in the region."

An investigation by The Ferret and The National revealed in July 2025 that Swinney had actively sought a meeting with the Israeli ambassador Tzipi Hotovely from early June 2024. Emails and WhatsApp messages obtained under Freedom of Information legislation revealed that Scottish Government ministers and senior advisers were closely involved in managing the meeting, with discussions focused on communications strategy and anticipating FOI requests. A Scottish Government official was quoted as saying, "Transparency is obviously a good thing, but it takes up such a lot of our time." The minutes of the meeting between Robertson and Grudsky Ekstein were heavily redacted, but described Scotland and Israel as "critical friends". Robertson had previously claimed that one of the priorities for the meeting was to express the Scottish Government's support for an "end of UK arms being sent to Israel", however there was no mention of this in the minutes released. Following the revelations, Scottish Labour MSP Mercedes Villalba said the Swinney's government had "actively sought a meeting with a representative of a state whose prime minister is now wanted by the ICC for crimes against humanity". Amnesty International accused the Scottish Government's actions of not matching its rhetoric, and demanded "absolute clarity" on whether Robertson strongly challenged Israel over its conduct in Gaza. Simon Barrow, national secretary of the SNP Trade Union Group, the party's largest affiliate body, demanded "appropriate reparative action" on Swinney's part.

==== 2026 Scottish Parliament election ====
Swinney led the SNP into the 2026 Scottish Parliament election where the party lost six seats, yet Swinney remained as First minister with a minority government.

=== Second term (2026–present) ===
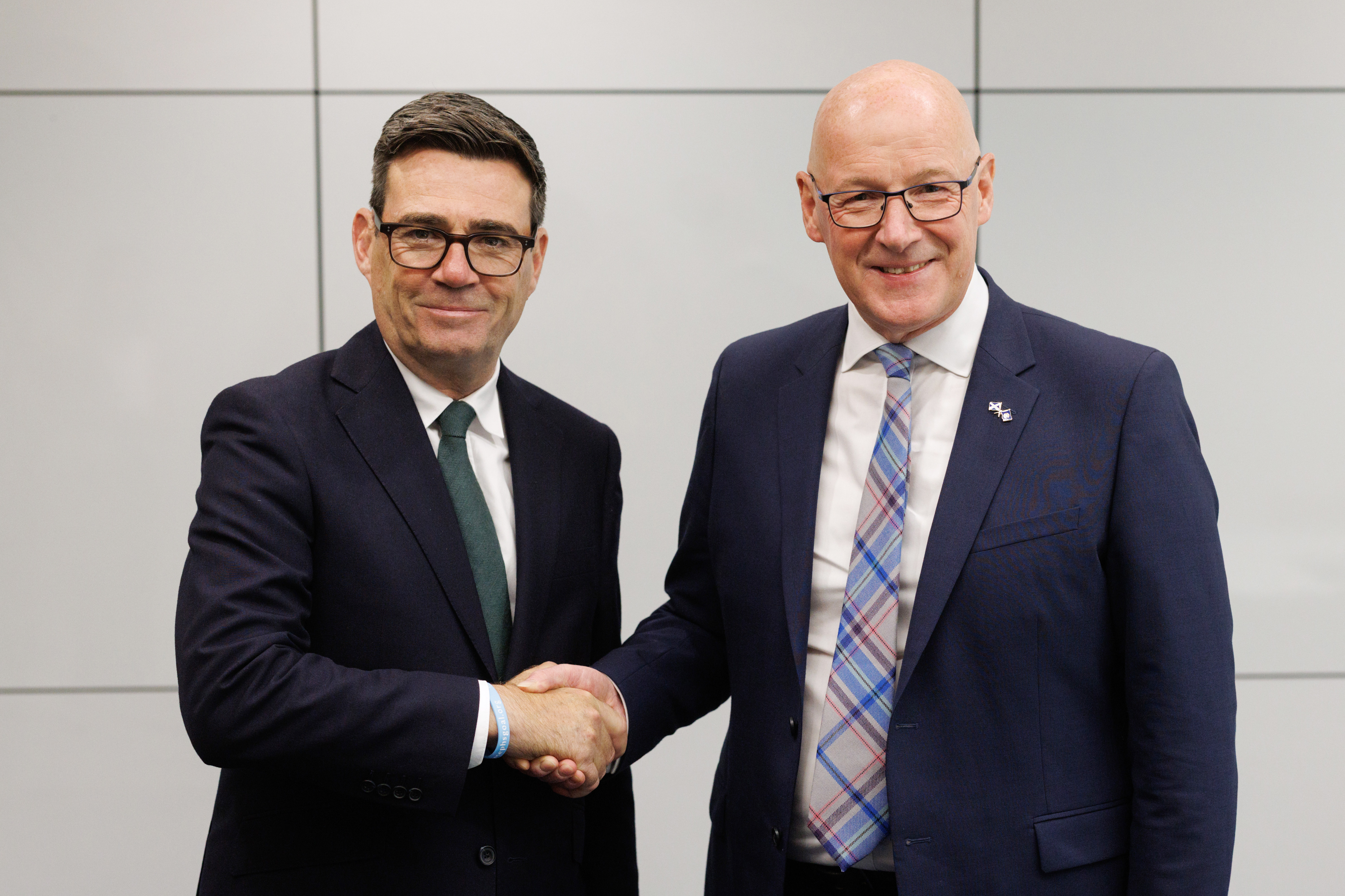
Swinney meeting Prime Minister Andy Burnham in 2026

Swinney hosts President of Ireland Catherine Connolly in Edinburgh, September 2026

==== Cabinet appointments ====
Following the 2026 Scottish Parliament election, a number of members of Swinney's cabinet either stepped down, were not re–elected or were not seeking re–election, causing Swinney to make significant changes. Swinney's second cabinet was significantly slimmed down from previous cabinets, with Jenny Gilruth replacing Kate Forbes as Deputy First Minister.

==== Constitution ====
In July 2026, Andy Burnham became the new Prime Minister of the United Kingdom, and met Swinney three days later in Glasgow ahead of the 2026 Commonwealth Games, where both leaders discussed domestic and government policy, as well as a second referendum on Scottish independence. Following the meeting, Swinney confirmed that Burnham had pledged a "commitment not to bypass Holyrood with his plans for further devolution of power", whilst 10 Downing Street later confirmed that the Prime Minister made clear that a second referendum on independence was "off limits". Burnham claimed that a second referendum on the matter of Scottish independence would "distract from growing the economy".

==== Welfare policy ====
In September 2026, Swinney criticised an announcement by Andy Burnham at the Labour Party conference that the "triple lock" to the state pension would be adjusted from 2030 to provide funding for a new National Care Service. Swinney claimed that pensions in Scotland would be £4 billion lower by 2050 than they would have been had the triple lock remained in place, and told the Scottish Parliament that the proposed reforms meant that Scots were "going to lose their pensions".

Swinney's claims were criticised as being inaccurate and misleading by opposition parties, as the value of the state pension would continue to rise under the proposed reforms and Scotland would benefit from Barnett consequentials as a result of increased spending on social care. An official statement by the Scottish Government said the Swinney's figure of £4 billion came from a projected population share of the savings made at a UK level, though the estimate did not take into account potential Barnett consequentials to Scotland's budget. Scottish Conservatives leader Russell Findlay called on Swinney to offer a correction to the parliamentary record, saying that "this inaccurate and irresponsible comment is inevitably causing concern to Scottish pensioners", and asked for an investigation by the independent advisers for the Scottish Ministerial Code. Swinney denied misleading parliament, saying "I've got nothing to explain to parliament about this issue", and wrote to Russell Findlay explaining his belief that there would be a "real terms" reduction in pensions "as compared to the existing triple lock policy".

On 7 October 2026, Swinney announced that he had referred the issue to the independent advisers for the Scottish Ministerial Code. A spokesman said that Swinney stood by his remarks on changes to the value of the state pension.

== Political positions ==
In September 2022, amid the death and state funeral of Elizabeth II, Swinney stated that the monarch should remain head of state of an independent Scotland. In May 2024, during an interview with Sky News, Swinney claimed that he believed that Scotland could become independent "in the next five years" as a consequence of Brexit and the cost of living crisis. In May 2024, Swinney described himself as following a "moderate centre-left agenda".

In April 2025, Swinney called for the band Kneecap to be banned from Scotland's TRNSMT music festival.

== Personal life ==
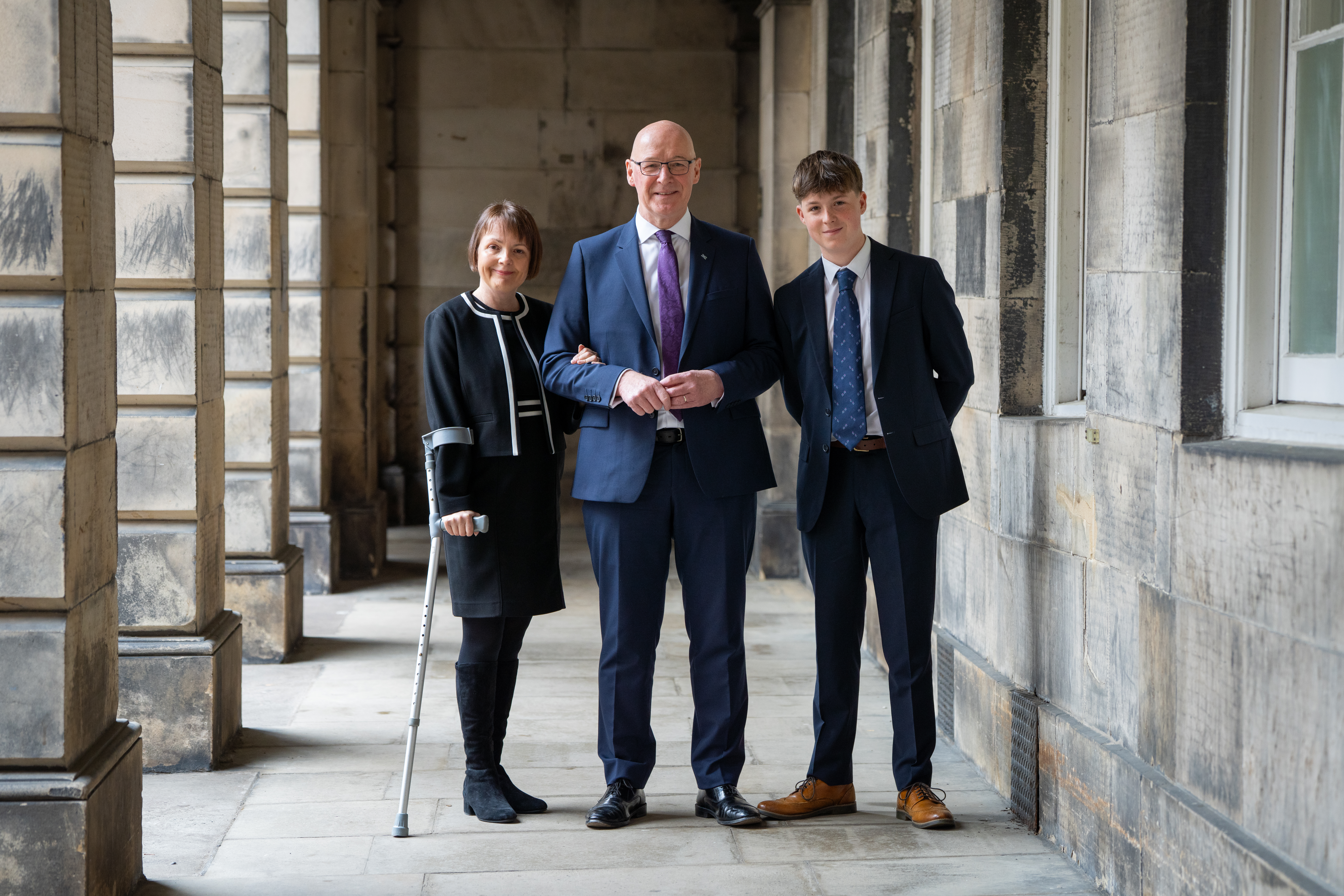
Swinney with his wife, Elizabeth Quigley, and their son, Matthew, in 2026

Swinney married Lorna King on 30 November 1991 in Bishopbriggs and the marriage was legally dissolved in 2000. They had two children: Judith, born in 1994, and Stuart, born in 1996. The couple divorced after the Daily Record revealed King had an affair with a married nursery teacher. The marriage was subsequently annulled by the Roman Rota in order that Swinney be allowed to marry in the Catholic Church, to which his second wife belongs.

Swinney married Elizabeth Quigley, a BBC News Scotland reporter, on 26 July 2003 at St Peter's Church, Edinburgh. Quigley was diagnosed with multiple sclerosis in 2000. In 2010, she gave birth to Swinney's third child, Matthew. They live in Woodside, Perth and Kinross. Between 2003 and 2011, Swinney owned a second home on Hermitage Terrace in Morningside, Edinburgh. At the time of its purchase for £355,000, it was reported as the most expensive second home bought by an MSP using parliamentary allowances. Swinney sold the property in 2011 for £430,000 following changes to the expenses system in the wake of the Westminster expenses scandal, making a reported profit of around £75,000.

Swinney is a member of the Church of Scotland and has described himself as "a man of deep Christian faith". However, he has clashed with his party colleague Kate Forbes due to her religious views (Forbes is a member of the Free Church of Scotland, a smaller and more conservative religious group).

Swinney was appointed to the Privy Council on 10 July 2024, entitling him to be styled "The Right Honourable" for life.

== Notes ==
Parliament of the United Kingdom
Preceded by Bill Walker	Member of Parliament for North Tayside; 1997–2001	Succeeded by Pete Wishart
Scottish Parliament
New constituency	Member of the Scottish Parliament for North Tayside; 1999–2011	Constituency abolished
New constituency	Member of the Scottish Parliament for Perthshire North; 2011–present	Incumbent
Political offices
Preceded by Tom McCabe as Minister for Finance and Public Service Reform	Cabinet Secretary for Finance, Constitution and Economy; 2007–2016	Succeeded by Derek Mackay as Cabinet Secretary for Finance and the Constitution
Preceded by Nicola Sturgeon	Deputy First Minister of Scotland; 2014–2023	Succeeded by Shona Robison
Preceded by Humza Yousaf	First Minister of Scotland; 2024–present	Incumbent
Party political offices
Preceded by Neil MacCallum	National Secretary of the Scottish National Party; 1986–1992	Succeeded by Alasdair Morgan
Preceded by Michael Russell	Scottish National Party Vice Convenor for Publicity; 1992–1997	Office abolished
Preceded by Allan Macartney	Depute Leader of the Scottish National Party; 1998–2000	Succeeded by Roseanna Cunningham
Preceded by Alex Salmond	Leader of the Scottish National Party; 2000–2004 (National Convener 2000 – April 2004)	Succeeded by Alex Salmond
Preceded by Humza Yousaf	Leader of the Scottish National Party; 2024–present	Incumbent
Order of precedence in Scotland
Preceded by Andy Burnham as Prime Minister of the United Kingdom	Keeper of the Great Seal of Scotland; 2024–present	Succeeded by Alison Johnstone as Presiding Officer of the Scottish Parliament
