= 2000 Scottish National Party leadership election =

Scottish National Party (SNP) leadership election

- 23 September 2000
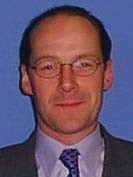

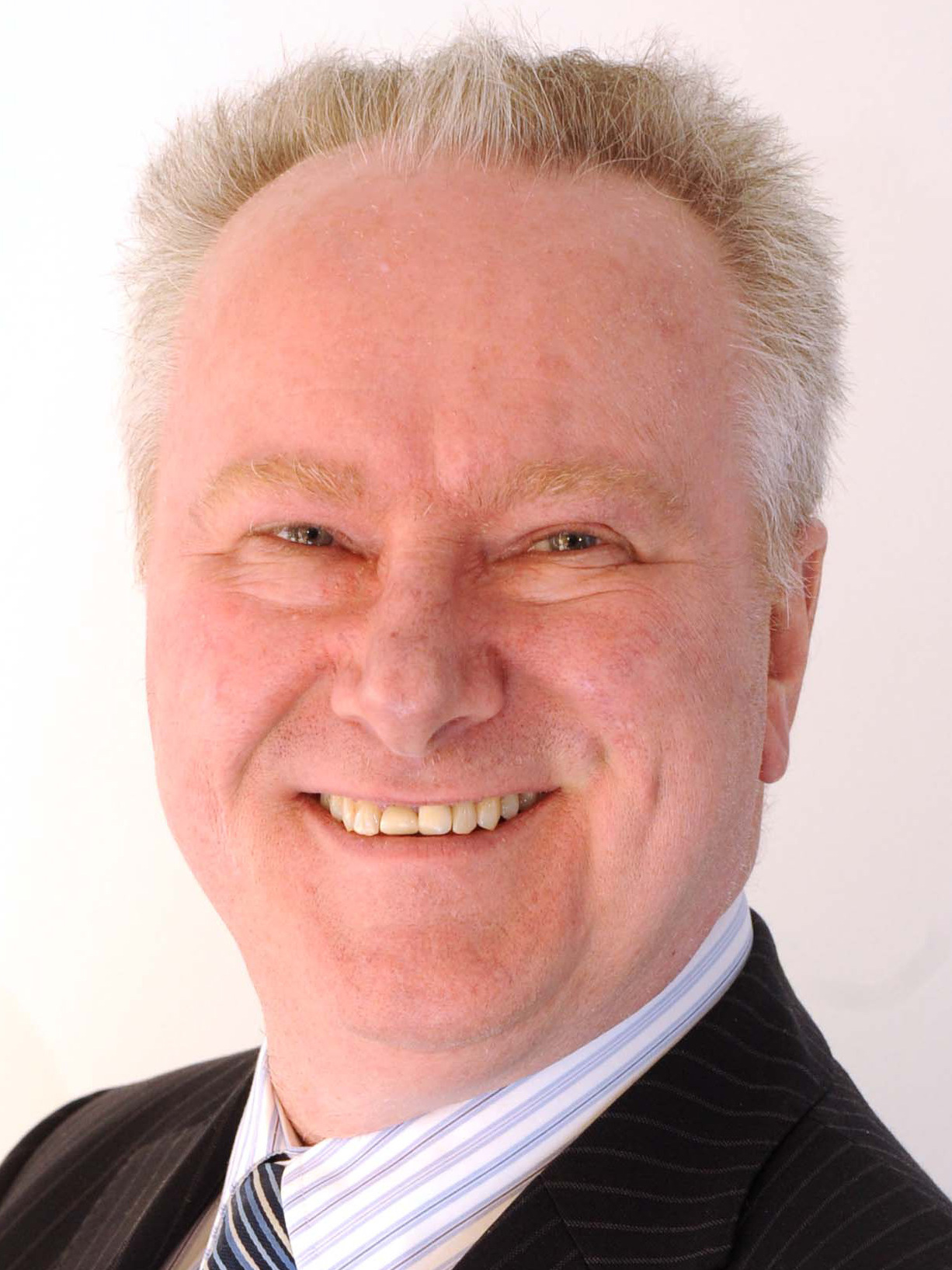
Candidate	John Swinney	Alex Neil
Popular vote	547	268
Percentage	67.1%	32.9%
Leader before election
Alex Salmond
Elected Leader
John Swinney

There was a Scottish National Party leadership election to choose the new National Convener of the Scottish National Party (SNP) in 2000. The election followed the announcement by SNP Leader Alex Salmond, that he would be stepping down as SNP leader in 2000. Salmond's announcement came in the face of internal criticism after a series of high-profile fall-outs with party members. Elections were also held for the position of Depute Leader.

The election saw John Swinney become National Convener, and Roseanna Cunningham become Depute Leader.

== National Convener election ==
=== Candidates ===
Two candidates presented themselves for election; SNP Depute Leader and spokesman on enterprise and lifelong learning, John Swinney; and the SNP vice-convener for policy and social security spokesman, Alex Neil. Swinney was simultaneously serving as both an MP and MSP, and Neil was a serving MSP.

=== Issues ===
Whilst both candidates supported the position of the SNP on the centre-left, Neil was seen as the more left-wing of the two, and individuals associated with the Neil campaign argued that a Swinney administration would drag the SNP to the right.

In someways the fight was seen as being between the SNP's Fundamentalists and gradualists. Swinney was seen as representing the SNP gradualist wing, advocating devolution as a stepping stone towards Scottish independence. Neil however was far more critical and suspicious of devolution, viewing it as a means of undermining the case for independence, and was more forceful in pushing for a party emphasis on Scottish independence. Swinney, as a gradualist, argued that independence could only follow a successful vote in a referendum, whilst Neil believed that an SNP victory would be enough to secure negotiations for independence.

Both candidates opposed trident, and were largely pro-European Union. Swinney however advocated joining the Euro at the earliest opportunity, whilst Neil believed pre-emptive joining of the Euro could undermine Scottish jobs. Swinney also favoured greater European integration on issues such as defence, whilst Neil favoured a weaker EU, and opposed the pooling of defence forces.

=== Results ===
==== Voting system ====
Each SNP branch sent delegates to the election, with larger branches sending more members. Some 700 delegates had the right to vote.

==== Results ====
===== Leadership =====
The result of the election was announced at the party conference on 23 September. John Swinney won the election by 547 votes to 268.

Candidate	Delegate votes	
Candidate	Votes	%
John Swinney ✓	547	67.1%
Alex Neil	268	32.9%

===== Depute =====
First round
Candidate	Votes	
Candidate	Votes	%
Roseanna Cunningham	391	48.2%
Kenny MacAskill	312	38.5%
Peter Kearney ✗	108	13.3%

Second round
Candidate	Votes	
Candidate	Votes	%
Roseanna Cunningham ✓	457	58.6%
Kenny MacAskill	323	41.4%

===== Treasurer =====
Candidate	Delegate votes	
Candidate	Votes	%
Jim Mather ✓	632	78.9%
Ian Blackford	143	17.9%
Jim Wright	26	3.2%

== Endorsements ==
=== John Swinney ===
- Mike Russell
- Roseanna Cunningham
- Kenny MacAskill

=== Alex Neil ===
- Federation of Student Nationalists
- Adam Ingram
- Peter Kearney
