= 2003 Scottish National Party leadership election =

Scottish National Party (SNP) leadership election

- 27 September 2003
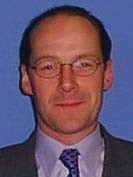

Candidate	John Swinney	Bill Wilson
Popular vote	577	111
Percentage	83.9%	16.1%
Leader before election
John Swinney
Elected Leader
John Swinney

There was a Scottish National Party leadership election in 2003 following a challenge to John Swinney's position as National Convener of the Scottish National Party (SNP). Swinney defeated his challenger, although his victory would be short lived, and he would step down the following year following an unsuccessful European election.

== Background ==
Following the poor showing of the SNP in the 2003 parliamentary and local elections, SNP activist Bill Wilson challenged Swinney for the party leadership. Wilson accused Swinney of ignoring the grassroots party membership, and argued that the SNP had failed to adequately fight for independence. Roseanna Cunningham called Wilson was a "stalking horse" candidate put forward to "weaken and damage" the leadership.

== Issues ==
Wilson ran a campaign attacking Swinney's proposals for party reform, which he claimed would centralise power and impoverish local branches. Wilson also challenged Swinney to a series of debates, although Swinney refused to take part. Wilson also attacked what he saw as the "New Labourization" of the party, and argued that the party was more effective at pressuring Labour into changing positions on issues, rather than actively seeking power itself.

The election was also yet another fight between the party's Fundamentalists and gradualists, with Wilson attacking Swinney's proposal for a referendum on independence before pursuing negotiations with the British government. Wilson argued that as soon as the SNP can form a government it should pursue negotiations to end the union.

== Result ==
The election was held at the party's 69th annual conference, and saw Swinney winning a massive victory over Wilson. Moves in support of Wilson's proposition of pursuing independence negotiations without a referendum were thrown out at the party conference, and Swinney won significant policy battles over imposing a monthly levy on party MP's, MSP's, and MEP's. In a surprise result, the new central membership system was also approved. The membership changes had been a key issue of attack from Wilson.

The election was the last SNP election to use the delegate voting method. Future elections would be based on a one-person-one-vote postal vote system.

Candidate	Delegate votes	
Candidate	Votes	%
John Swinney ✓	577	83.9%
Bill Wilson	111	16.1%
