= Hamilton South (Scottish Parliament constituency) =

Region or constituency of the Scottish Parliament

- Former burgh constituency for the Scottish Parliament
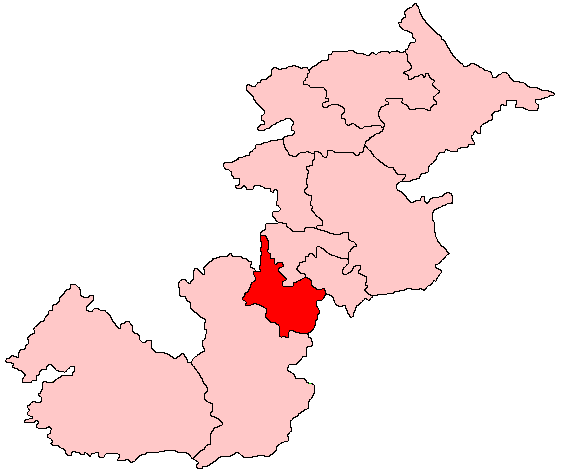

- Hamilton South shown within the Central Scotland electoral region and the region shown within Scotland

Former constituency
- Created: 1999
- Abolished: 2011
- Council area: South Lanarkshire

Hamilton South was a constituency of the Scottish Parliament. It elected one Member of the Scottish Parliament (MSP) by the plurality (first past the post) method of election. Under the additional-member electoral system used for elections to the Scottish Parliament, it was also one of ten constituencies in the Central Scotland electoral region, which elected seven additional members, in addition to ten constituency MSPs, to produce a form of proportional representation for the region as a whole.

The constituency was abolished ahead of the 2011 Scottish Parliament election, with the area covered being split between the seats of Rutherglen, Hamilton, Larkhall and Stonehouse, and Uddingston and Bellshill.

== Electoral region ==
The other nine constituencies of the Central Scotland region were: Airdrie and Shotts, Coatbridge and Chryston, Cumbernauld and Kilsyth, East Kilbride, Falkirk East, Falkirk West, Hamilton North and Bellshill, Kilmarnock and Loudoun and Motherwell and Wishaw.

The region covered all of the Falkirk council area, all of the North Lanarkshire council area, part of the South Lanarkshire council area, part of the East Ayrshire council area and a small part of the East Dumbartonshire council area.

== Constituency boundaries and council area ==
The constituency was created at the same time as the Scottish Parliament, in 1999, with the name and boundaries of an existing constituency of the UK House of Commons. Ahead of the 2005 Scottish Westminster constituencies were mostly replaced with new constituencies, whilst the existing boundaries initially continued to be used for elections to the Scottish Parliament.

Hamilton South was one of five covering the South Lanarkshire council area, the others being East Kilbride and Hamilton North and Bellshill, which were within the Central Scotland region, Glasgow Rutherglen, within the Glasgow region, and Clydesdale, within the South of Scotland region.

Three of the five constituencies were entirely within the South Lanarkshire area. Glasgow Rutherglen straddled the boundary with the Glasgow City council area, which was entirely within the Glasgow electoral region, and Hamilton North and Bellshill straddled the boundary with the North Lanarkshire council area, which was entirely within the Central Scotland region.

The Hamilton South constituency was south of Hamilton North and Bellshill, west of Clydesdale, north and east of East Kilbride and east of Glasgow Rutherglen.

== Member of the Scottish Parliament ==
Election	Member	Party
1999	Tom McCabe	Labour

== Election results ==
2007 Scottish Parliament election: Hamilton South
Party	Candidate	Votes	%	±%
Labour	Tom McCabe	10,280	44.3	−2.2
SNP	Christina McKelvie	6,628	28.6	+5.6
Conservative	Margaret Mitchell	2,929	12.6	−0.1
Independent	Michael McGlynn	1,764	7.6	New
Liberal Democrats	John Oswald	1,610	6.9	−1.7
Majority		3,652	15.7	−9.8
Turnout		23,211	47.5	+2.7
Labour hold		Swing		

2003 Scottish Parliament election: Hamilton South
Party	Candidate	Votes	%	±%
Labour	Tom McCabe	9,546	46.53	−7.86
SNP	John Wilson	4,722	23.01	−3.70
Conservative	Margaret Mitchell	2,601	12.68	+1.42
Scottish Socialist	Willie O'Neill	1,893	9.23	New
Liberal Democrats	John Oswald	1,756	8.56	+0.91
Majority		4,824	23.52	−4.16
Turnout		45,749	44.85	−10.58
Labour hold		Swing		

1999 Scottish Parliament election: Hamilton South
Party	Candidate	Votes	%	±%
Labour	Tom McCabe	14,098	54.39	N/A
SNP	Adam Ardrey	6,922	26.71	N/A
Conservative	Margaret Mitchell	2,918	11.26	N/A
Liberal Democrats	John Oswald	1,982	7.65	N/A
Majority		7,176	27.68	N/A
Turnout		25,920	55.43	N/A
Labour win (new seat)				
