= Hamilton North and Bellshill (Scottish Parliament constituency) =

Region or constituency of the Scottish Parliament

- Former burgh constituency for the Scottish Parliament
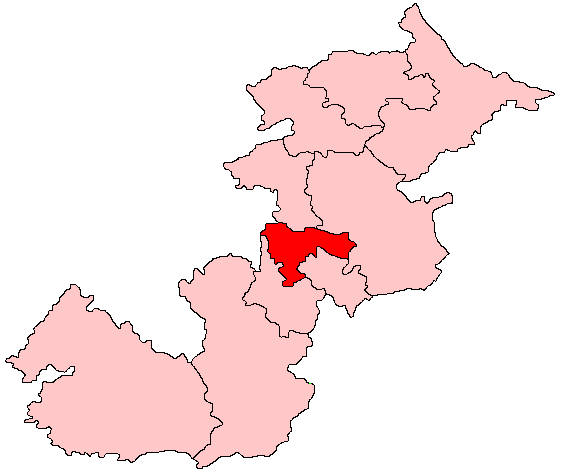

- Hamilton North and Bellshill shown within the Central Scotland electoral region and the region shown within Scotland

Former constituency
- Created: 1999
- Abolished: 2011
- Council area: North Lanarkshire and South Lanarkshire

Hamilton North and Bellshill was a constituency of the Scottish Parliament. It elected one Member of the Scottish Parliament (MSP) by the plurality (first past the post) method of election. Under the additional-member electoral system used for elections to the Scottish Parliament, it was also one of ten constituencies in the Central Scotland electoral region, which elected seven additional members, in addition to ten constituency MSPs, to produce a form of proportional representation for the region as a whole.

For the 2011 Scottish Parliament election, the constituency was abolished, being replaced by two new seats: Hamilton, Larkhall and Stonehouse, and Uddingston and Bellshill.

== Electoral region ==
See also Central Scotland Scottish Parliament region

The other nine constituencies of the Central Scotland region between 1999 and 2011 were: Airdrie and Shotts, Coatbridge and Chryston, Cumbernauld and Kilsyth, East Kilbride, Falkirk East, Falkirk West, Hamilton South, Kilmarnock and Loudoun and Motherwell and Wishaw.

The region covered all of the Falkirk council area, all of the North Lanarkshire council area, part of the South Lanarkshire council area, part of the East Ayrshire council area and a small part of the East Dumbartonshire council area.

== Constituency boundaries and council areas ==
The constituency was created at the same time as the Scottish Parliament, in 1999, with the name and boundaries of an existing Westminster constituency. In 2005, however, Scottish Westminster (House of Commons) constituencies were mostly replaced with new constituencies.

Hamilton North and Bellshill covered a western portion of the North Lanarkshire council area and a northern portion of the South Lanarkshire council area.

=== North Lanarkshire council area ===
The rest of the North Lanarkshire area was covered by Airdrie and Shotts, Coatbridge and Chryston, Cumbernauld and Kilsyth and Motherwell and Wishaw, which were also within the Central Scotland electoral region. Coatbridge and Chryston straddled the North Lanarkshire boundary with the East Dunbartonshire council area, which was otherwise within the West of Scotland electoral region.

=== South Lanarkshire council area ===
The rest of the South Lanarkshire area was covered by another four constituencies: East Kilbride and Hamilton South, which were within the Central Scotland region, Glasgow Rutherglen, within the Glasgow region, and Clydesdale, within the South of Scotland region. Glasgow Rutherglen straddled the South Lanarkshire boundary with the Glasgow City council area, which was entirely within the Glasgow electoral region.

== Member of the Scottish Parliament ==
Election	Member	Party
1999	Michael McMahon	Labour

== Election results ==
2007 Scottish Parliament election: Hamilton North and Bellshill
Party	Candidate	Votes	%	±%
Labour	Michael McMahon	12,334	48.6	−4.3
SNP	Alex Neil	7,469	29.4	+9.1
Conservative	James Callander	2,835	11.2	+0.4
Liberal Democrats	Douglas Herbison	1,726	6.8	+0.7
Scottish Voice	Joseph Gorman	571	2.2	New
Independent	Gordon Weir	431	1.7	New
Majority		4,865	19.2	−13.5
Turnout		25,366	47.1	−3.2
Labour hold		Swing		

2003 Scottish Parliament election: Hamilton North and Bellshill
Party	Candidate	Votes	%	±%
Labour	Michael McMahon	12,812	52.95	+4.17
SNP	Alex Neil	4,907	20.28	−10.54
Conservative	Charles Ferguson	2,625	10.85	+0.60
Scottish Socialist	Shareen Blackhall	1,932	7.99	+7.99
Liberal Democrats	Siobhan Mathers	1,477	6.10	−0.64
Majority		7,905	32.67	+14.71
Turnout		24,195	51.95	−11.26
Labour hold		Swing		

1999 Scottish Parliament election: Hamilton North and Bellshill
Party	Candidate	Votes	%	±%
Labour	Michael McMahon	15,227	48.78	N/A
SNP	Kathleen McAlorum	9,621	30.82	N/A
Conservative	Stuart Thomson	3,199	10.25	N/A
Liberal Democrats	Jayne Struthers	2,105	6.74	N/A
Socialist Labour	Katherine McGavigan	1,064	3.41	N/A
Majority		5,606	17.96	N/A
Turnout		31,216	63.2	N/A
Labour win (new seat)				

== See also ==
- Hamilton North and Bellshill (UK Parliament constituency)
