= Hamilton North and Bellshill =

Hamilton North and Bellshill may mean or refer to:

- Hamilton North and Bellshill (UK Parliament constituency)
- Hamilton North and Bellshill (Scottish Parliament constituency)
