= Stephanie Callaghan =

Scottish National Party politician

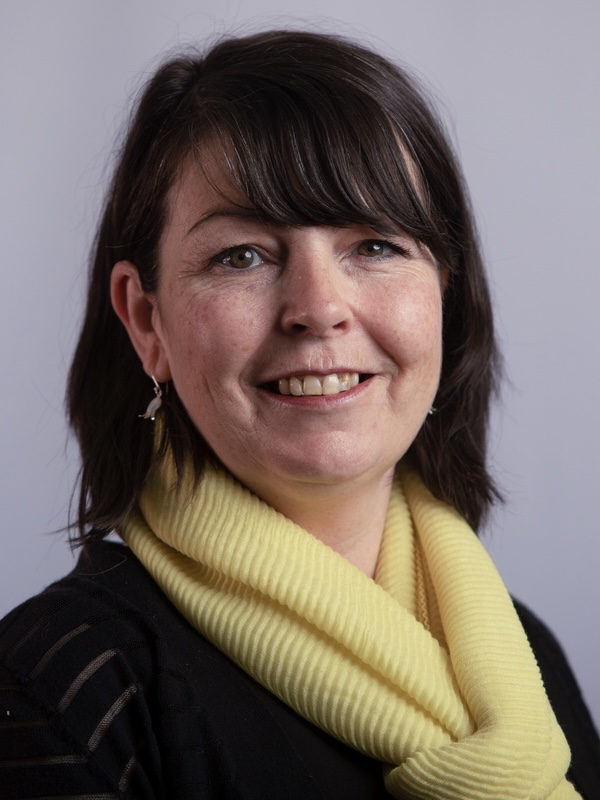
- Official portrait, 2021

Member of the Scottish Parliament for Uddingston and Bellshill
- In office 6 May 2021 – 9 April 2026
- Preceded by: Richard Lyle
- Succeeded by: Steven Bonnar

Personal details
- Born: 24 April 1971 (age 55) Hamilton, Scotland
- Party: Scottish National Party
- Other political affiliations: Scottish Labour (until 2014)
- Children: 3
- Education: University of Strathclyde

Stephanie Callaghan (born 24 April 1971) is a Scottish politician who was the Member of the Scottish Parliament (MSP) for Uddingston and Bellshill between May 2021 and May 2026. A member of the Scottish National Party (SNP), she was a councillor for South Lanarkshire, representing the Hamilton North and East ward from 2016 to 2022.

== Early life and career ==
Callaghan was born in Hamilton, South Lanarkshire. She attended the University of Strathclyde. She worked as a manager for Holland and Barrett and took on trainees through Right Track, an organisation assisting young people find jobs and learn skills. She then went on to work for the organisation as a placement officer and then a project coordinator. In her roles, she helped early school leavers and long-term unemployed young people to find jobs.

== Political career ==
=== Early political years ===
While at university in the late 1980s, Callaghan joined the Scottish Labour Party when she was 18. She has campaigned against the Poll Tax and student loans. In the aftermath of the Yes Scotland campaign's defeat in the 2014 Scottish independence referendum, she joined the Scottish National Party.

Callaghan was elected to South Lanarkshire Council on 21 January 2016 in a by-election for the Hamilton North and East ward, following the death of Lynn Adams. She was re-elected in the following year's Scottish local elections.

=== Scottish Parliament ===
On 8 May 2021, she was elected as Member of the Scottish Parliament (MSP) for Uddingston and Bellshill.

Scottish Parliament
Preceded by Richard Lyle	Member of the Scottish Parliament for Uddingston and Bellshill; 2021–2026	Succeeded by Steven Bonnar
