= Collette Stevenson =

Scottish National Party politician

Collette Stevenson MSP
- Official portrait, 2026

Member of the Scottish Parliament for East Kilbride
- Incumbent
- Assumed office 6 May 2021
- Preceded by: Linda Fabiani
- Majority: 4,944 (14.6%)

Councillor, South Lanarkshire Council
- In office 5 May 2017 – 4 May 2022
- Constituency: East Kilbride Central South

Personal details
- Born: Collette McDade; 1969 (age 56–57) East Kilbride, Scotland
- Party: Scottish National Party
- Education: University of the West of Scotland
- Occupation: Administrator

Collette Stevenson (née McDade, born 1969) is a Scottish National Party (SNP) politician. She has served as the Member of the Scottish Parliament (MSP) for East Kilbride since May 2021.

She served as a local councillor for South Lanarkshire's East Kilbride Central South ward from 2017 and was depute provost at the time of her election as an MSP; she stood down as a councillor ahead of the 2022 local elections.

Stevenson was raised in East Kilbride, where she lives with her family. A graduate in business from the University of the West of Scotland, she was employed in administrative roles at the local authority. She was a founding member of the East Kilbride branch of Women for Independence.

In February 2025, Stevenson was reported to be on an all-female "hit list" of SNP MSPs that were to be asked to stand down from the Scottish Parliament to make room for ex-MPs who had lost their seats in the 2024 general election. The alleged list was reported to have been drawn up at Stephen Flynn's direction by Aberdeenshire North and Moray East MP Seamus Logan. In May 2025, she was reselected for the 2026 Scottish Parliament election.

In September 2026, the BBC reported that Stevenson made a serious error when she seemed to think that Transport Scotland was a charity, when in fact it is an agency of the Scottish Government. This was viewed as particularly embarrassing as she is a member of the Transport Committee at the Scottish Parliament.

Scottish Parliament
Preceded by Linda Fabiani	MSP for East Kilbride; 2021 – present	Incumbent
