= Elaine Smith (Scottish politician) =

Scottish Labour politician

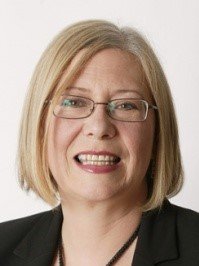
- Smith in 2011

Deputy Presiding Officer of the Scottish Parliament
- In office 11 May 2011 – 12 May 2016 Serving with John Scott
- Presiding Officer: Tricia Marwick
- Preceded by: Trish Godman
- Succeeded by: Christine Grahame
Parliamentary offices
Member of the Scottish Parliament for Central Scotland (1 of 7 Regional MSPs)
In office 5 May 2016 – 5 May 2021
Member of the Scottish Parliament for Coatbridge and Chryston
In office 6 May 1999 – 24 March 2016
Preceded by	Constituency established
Succeeded by	Fulton MacGregor

Scottish Labour portfolios
- 2017–2019: Shadow Minister for the Eradication of Poverty and Inequality
- 2019–2021: Shadow Minister for Parliamentary Business
- 2020–2021: Shadow Minister for the Eradication of Poverty and Inequality

Personal details
- Born: Elaine Agnes Smith; 5 May 1963 (age 63) Coatbridge, North Lanarkshire, Scotland
- Party: Scottish Labour
- Other political affiliations: Campaign for Socialism
- Spouse: Vann Smith
- Children: 1 son
- Website: Elaine Smith MSP official biography

Elaine Agnes Smith (born 5 May 1963) is a former Scottish Labour politician who served as a Member of the Scottish Parliament (MSP) for the Central Scotland region from 2016 until she stood down at the 2021 election. She was previously MSP for the Coatbridge and Chryston constituency from 1999 until 2016.

== Early life and career ==
Smith was born in Coatbridge, North Lanarkshire and attended St Patrick's School, a local co-educational Roman Catholic school. She studied Economics and Politics at Glasgow College and then trained as a Modern Studies and Economics teacher at St Andrews College, a Catholic teacher-training institution in Glasgow. She worked as a secondary school teacher before becoming a local government officer, also gaining a Diploma in Public Sector Management.

== Political career ==
Smith was elected as a Scottish Labour MSP for her local constituency of Coatbridge and Chryston in the 1999 Scottish Parliament election, with a majority of 10,404. She subsequently went on to be returned in 2003, 2007 and 2011, with majorities of 8,571, 4,510 and 2,741 respectively. On 11 May 2011, she was elected to serve as one of two Deputy Presiding Officers of the Scottish Parliament.

In 2013, Smith voiced her opposition to same-sex marriage, claiming at a session of the Equal Opportunities Committee that its introduction could lead to polygamy. Smith was one of three Labour MSPs that voted against the Marriage and Civil Partnership (Scotland) Act 2014.

Smith supported Jeremy Corbyn during both the 2015 and 2016 Labour Party leadership elections. During the 2016 European Union membership referendum, she backed Britain leaving the European Union, contrary to the position of the Labour Party.

In the 2016 Scottish Parliament election, Smith lost her seat by 3,779 votes after watching her vote share drop by 17.6%. She gained a list seat as one of seven additional members for the Central Scotland region and was returned for the new session. Following the retirement of Tricia Marwick, she attempted to be elected Presiding Officer of the Scottish Parliament. However, she was defeated by Ken Macintosh, a fellow Labour MSP and one of the additional members for the West Scotland region. After standing down as a Deputy Presiding Officer, she became a member of the Standards, Procedures and Public Appointments Committee.

Smith supported Richard Leonard in the 2017 Scottish Labour Party leadership election. Following Leonard's victory, she was appointed to his frontbench and was given the new role of Scottish Labour Spokesperson for Eradication of Poverty and Inequality. Her appointment was controversial because of her record of opposing same-sex marriage.

In February 2018, Smith invited anti-abortion academic Professor Priscilla K. Coleman to speak at an event in the Scottish Parliament discussing what Coleman believes is the harmful impact of abortion on mental health. After facing criticism from Scottish Labour colleagues, Smith withdrew the invitation, citing a "diary clash". In response to the backlash, Richard Leonard said "It has been made clear to Elaine that she needs to comply with the party’s policy on issues like a woman’s right to choose."

In September 2019, Smith announced she would be standing down at the next Scottish Parliament election on health grounds. Later that month, she became Scottish Labour Parliamentary Business Manager, replacing Neil Findlay.

Smith nominated Monica Lennon in the 2021 Scottish Labour leadership election. She stood down at the 2021 Scottish Parliament election.

== Personal life ==
Smith is a member of the trade unions Unite the Union, formerly Transport and General Workers' Union (TGWU), and General Teaching Council for Scotland (GTC).

Scottish Parliament
New parliament Scotland Act 1998	Member of the Scottish Parliament for Coatbridge and Chryston; 1999–2016	Succeeded by Fulton MacGregor
