= East Kilbride Central South (ward) =

Electoral ward in South Lanarkshire, Scotland

- South Lanarkshire
- Boundary of East Kilbride Central South in South Lanarkshire from 2007–2017.
- Population: 16,985 (2021)
- Electorate: 12,012 (2022)
- Major settlements: East Kilbride (part of)
- Scottish Parliament constituency: East Kilbride
- Scottish Parliament region: Central Scotland
- UK Parliament constituency: East Kilbride and Strathaven

Current ward
- Created: 2007
- Number of councillors: 3
- Councillor: John Anderson (SNP)
- Councillor: Gerry Convery (Labour)
- Councillor: Elaine McDougall (SNP)
- Created from: Duncanrig; Hairmyres/Crosshouse; Headhouse; Heatheryknowe; Westwoodhill

East Kilbride Central South is one of the 20 electoral wards of South Lanarkshire Council. Created in 2007, the ward elects three councillors using the single transferable vote electoral system and covers an area with a population of 16,985 people.

The ward was a Labour stronghold from its creation until 2017 with the party holding two of the three seats. However, it has since become a Scottish National Party (SNP) stronghold with the party holding two of the three seats from 2017 to present.

== Boundaries ==
The ward was created following the Fourth Statutory Reviews of Electoral Arrangements ahead of the 2007 Scottish local elections. As a result of the Local Governance (Scotland) Act 2004, local elections in Scotland would use the single transferable vote electoral system from 2007 onwards so East Kilbride Central South was formed from an amalgamation of several previous first-past-the-post wards. It contained the majority of the former Headhouse, part of the former Hairmyres/Crosshouse, Heatheryknowe and Westwoodhill wards as well as all of the former Duncanrig ward. As the name suggests, its territory covers the parts of East Kilbride just south of the town centre which includes Birniehill, Murrayhill, The Murray, Westwood and Westwoodhill with the northern boundary being the Queensway (A726) dual carriageway. Following the Fifth Statutory Reviews of Electoral Arrangements ahead of the 2017 Scottish local elections, a few streets around Owen Avenue and Dale Avenue which had always generally been considered to belong to The Murray neighbourhood were moved from East Kilbride South to East Kilbride Central South.

== Councillors ==
Election	Councillors		
2007	John Anderson (SNP)	Gerry Convery (Labour)	Pat Watters (Labour)
2012	John Anderson (SNP)	Gerry Convery (Labour)	Susan Kerr (Labour)
2017	John Anderson (SNP)	Gerry Convery (Labour)	Collette Stevenson (SNP)
2022	John Anderson (SNP)	Gerry Convery (Labour)	Elaine McDougall (SNP)

== Election results ==
=== 2022 election ===
East Kilbride Central South - 3 seats
Party	Candidate	FPv%	Count								
Party	Candidate	FPv%	1	2	3	4	5	6	7	8	9
SNP	John Anderson (incumbent)	30.2	1,570								
Labour	Gerry Convery (incumbent)	26.7	1,387								
SNP	Elaine McDougall	13.7	713	911	915	918	950	955	1,091	1,101	1,284
Labour	Lisa Quarrell	12.0	623	632	686	693	700	744	783	977	
Conservative	Alan Fraser	9.1	473	474	480	486	488	516	526		
Scottish Green	Alan Cresswell	3.9	202	228	231	234	246	280			
Liberal Democrats	Lorna Cammock	2.7	138	143	147	151	157				
Alba	Rita Baillie	1.3	66	74	75	76					
UKIP	David Mackay	0.6	30	30	31						
Electorate: 12,012 Valid: 5,202 Spoilt: 132 Quota: 1,301 Turnout: 44.4%

=== 2017 election ===
East Kilbride Central South - 3 seats
Party	Candidate	FPv%	Count						
Party	Candidate	FPv%	1	2	3	4	5	6	7
SNP	John Anderson (incumbent)	31.4	1,705						
Labour	Gerry Convery (incumbent)	26.2	1,425						
Conservative	Willie Chalmers	15.2	825	832	835	863	888	988	
SNP	Collette Stevenson	14.5	790	1,067	1,070	1,074	1,180	1,254	1,394
Labour	Susan Kerr (incumbent)	6.9	376	392	441	468	514		
Scottish Green	Iain Hughes	4.0	220	241	243	264			
Liberal Democrats	Mark Watson	1.8	98	101	102				
Electorate: 12,273 Valid: 5,439 Spoilt: 145 Quota: 1360 Turnout: 45.5%

=== 2012 election ===
East Kilbride Central South - 3 seats
Party	Candidate	FPv%	Count					
Party	Candidate	FPv%	1	2	3	4	5	6
SNP	John Anderson (incumbent)	38.0	1,721					
Labour	Gerry Convery (incumbent)	35.3	1,598					
Labour	Susan Kerr	12.8	581	614	1,012	1,044	1,108	1,306
SNP	Duncan McLean	6.8	306	795	804	826	860	
Conservative	Isabel Perratt	4.9	223	232	237	254		
Liberal Democrats	Alasdair Sutherland	2.1	95	106	115			
Electorate: 10,854 Valid: 4,524 Spoilt: 133 Quota: 1,132 Turnout: 41.7%

=== 2007 election ===
East Kilbride Central South - 3 seats
Party	Candidate	FPv%	Count							
Party	Candidate	FPv%	1	2	3	4	5	6	7	8
SNP	John Anderson	32.0	1,970							
Labour	Gerry Convery (Note: Returning councillor for Heatheryknowe single-member ward.)	27.5	1,692							
Labour	Pat Watters (Note: Returning councillor for Headhouse single-member ward.)	17.7	1,089	1,145	1,247	1,281	1,329	1,388	???	???
Conservative	Anne Stewart	6.2	383	408	410	414	466			
Liberal Democrats	Colin Linskey	5.1	316	378	387	408	481	601	???	
East Kilbride Alliance	Iain Cameron	5.0	309	362	367	387				
Scottish Green	Alison Campbell	4.1	254	326	331	396	507	584		
Scottish Socialist	Mark Sands	2.4	150	194	198					
Electorate: 11,524 Valid: 6,163 Quota: 1,541 Turnout: 54.8%
