= Fulton MacGregor =

Scottish National Party politician

Fulton MacGregor MSP
- Official portrait, 2026

Member of the Scottish Parliament for Coatbridge and Chryston
- Incumbent
- Assumed office 5 May 2016
- Preceded by: Elaine Smith
- Majority: 6,776 (23.0%)

Personal details
- Born: Fulton James MacGregor; 1980 (age 45–46) Airdrie, Scotland
- Party: Scottish National Party
- Education: University of Strathclyde; University of Edinburgh

Fulton James MacGregor (born 1980) is a Scottish National Party (SNP) politician who has been the Member of the Scottish Parliament (MSP) for the constituency of Coatbridge and Chryston since 2016. He serves on the Justice and Education & Skills committees in the Scottish Parliament.

== Early life ==
MacGregor attended Coatbridge High School before going on to gain degrees in Psychology and in Social Work from the University of Strathclyde and the University of Edinburgh.

== Political career ==
MacGregor stood as an SNP candidate in the North Lanarkshire Council election in 2012 and was elected as one of four councillors for the Coatbridge North and Glenboig ward.

In August 2015 MacGregor was selected by the SNP as their local candidate to contest the Coatbridge and Chryston constituency at the 2016 Scottish Parliament election. In an acrimonious internal selection process, party members chose MacGregor ahead of five other candidates. A small minority of branch members then unsuccessfully attempted to have MacGregor de-selected as a candidate. In February 2016 the Coatbridge and Chryston Branch was suspended entirely by the SNP, until the election had passed. Branch members later went as far as to plan a silent protest at the 2016 SNP party conference held in Glasgow in March. In a secret recording of one meeting, MacGregor was heard stating that the internal fighting was making him "physically sick". During the campaign MacGregor was branded as 'no show', a name initially coined by journalist Tom Gordon in reference to him not attending a hustings.

On 6 May 2016, MacGregor was elected as the first SNP MSP for Coatbridge and Chryston. He retained the seat in the 2021 election with an increased majority and 57% of the vote share.
