= 2012 South Lanarkshire Council election =

South Lanarkshire Council election

- 3 May 2012

All 67 seats to South Lanarkshire Council 34 seats needed for a majority
- Registered: 241,187
- Turnout: 39.1%
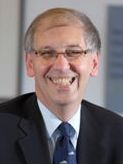
	First party	Second party	Third party
	Lab	SNP	Con
Leader	Edward McAvoy	Anne Maggs	Hamish Stewart
Party	Labour	SNP	Conservative
Leader's seat	Rutherglen Central and North	East Kilbride Central North	Clydesdale East
Last election	30 seats, 44.8%	24 seats, 35.8%	8 seats, 12.9%
Seats won	33	28	3
Seat change	▲3	▲4	▼5
Popular vote	39,892	33,596	10,015
Percentage	43.2%	36.4%	10.8%
Swing	▲3.6%	▲7.2%	▼2.1%
	Fourth party	Fifth party
	Ind
Leader	Graeme Campbell	Robert Brown
Party	Independent	Liberal Democrats
Leader's seat	Avondale and Stonehouse	Rutherglen South
Last election	3 seats, 4.5%	2 seats, 7.2%
Seats won	2	1
Seat change	▼1	▼1
Popular vote	2,734	2,544
Percentage	3.0%	2.8%
Swing	▼2.2%	▼4.4%
- Results by ward.
Council Leader before election
Edward McAvoy
(Labour)
No overall control
Council Leader after election
Edward McAvoy
(Labour)
No overall control

Elections to South Lanarkshire Council took place on 3 May 2012 on the same day as the 31 other Scottish local government elections. As with other Scottish council elections, it was held using single transferable vote (STV) – a form of proportional representation – in which multiple candidates are elected in each ward and voters rank candidates in order of preference.

Labour retained their position as the largest party on the council as they gained three seats from 2007 but were one seat short of an overall majority. The Scottish National Party (SNP) also increased their representation and remained in second place on the authority after gaining four seats to hold 28. The Conservatives lost the majority of their seats as they fell from eight to three. One less independent candidate was elected with two returned and the remaining seat was won by the Liberal Democrats who lost one seat.

Labour initially formed a minority administration to run the council before, in February 2013, they took overall control of South Lanarkshire Council after winning a by-election from the SNP.

== Election result ==
2012 South Lanarkshire local election result
Party	Seats	Gains	Losses	Net gain/loss	Seats %	Votes %	Votes	+/−
Labour	33	4	1	▲3	49.3	43.2	39,892	▲3.6
SNP	28	4	0	▲4	41.7	36.4	33,596	▲7.2
Conservative	3	0	5	▼5	4.5	10.8	10,015	▼2.1
Independent	2	1	2	▼1	3.0	3.0	2,734	▼2.2
Liberal Democrats	1	0	1	▼1	1.5	2.8	2,544	▼4.4
Green	0	0	0	Steady	0.0	1.4	1,326	▼1.3
East Kilbride Alliance	0	0	0	Steady	0.0	0.7	681	▼0.5
UKIP	0	0	0	Steady	0.0	0.6	515	New
Scottish Unionist	0	0	0	Steady	0.0	0.3	278	▼0.4
Scottish Christian	0	0	0	Steady	0.0	0.3	230	▲0.2
CPA	0	0	0	Steady	0.0	0.2	209	New
Scottish Senior Citizens	0	0	0	Steady	0.0	0.2	199	New
Solidarity	0	0	0	Steady	0.0	0.2	166	Steady
Total	67						92,385	

Note: Votes are the sum of first preference votes across all council wards. The net gain/loss and percentage changes relate to the result of the previous Scottish local elections on 3 May 2007. This is because STV has an element of proportionality which is not present unless multiple seats are being elected. This may differ from other published sources showing gain/loss relative to seats held at the dissolution of Scotland's councils.

== Ward results ==
=== Clydesdale West ===
The SNP retained both the seats they had won at the previous election while Labour held their only seat and gained one seat from the Conservatives.

Clydesdale West - 4 seats
Party	Candidate	FPv%	Count								
Party	Candidate	FPv%	1	2	3	4	5	6	7	8	9
Labour	Eileen Logan (incumbent)	29.1	1,687								
SNP	David Shearer (incumbent)	19.8	1,149	1,180							
SNP	Pat Lee (Note: Clydesdale West councillor Pat Lee defected from the SNP and joined Solidarity on 27 May 2015.)	15.9	921	944	960	977	989	1,000	1,023	1,094	1,248
Labour	Lynsey Hamilton	15.1	877	1,280							
Conservative	Alex Allison (incumbent)	11.1	644	653	662	662	674	700	728	799	
Independent	Duncan McFarlane	4.3	246	258	269	269	284	317	353		
Liberal Democrats	Peter Charles Meehan	2.2	126	136	143	144	149	150			
UKIP	Neil MacLeod	1.4	78	82	86	86	96				
Scottish Christian	Robin Mawhinney	1.1	65	69	74	74					
Electorate: 14,923 Valid: 5,793 Spoilt: 92 Quota: 1,159 Turnout: 38.8%

=== Clydesdale North ===
Labour and the SNP held the seats they had won at the previous election while independent candidate Ed Archer gained a seat from the Conservatives.

Clydesdale North - 3 seats
Party	Candidate	FPv%	Count					
Party	Candidate	FPv%	1	2	3	4	5	6
Labour	Catherine McClymont	27.5	1,253					
SNP	Vivienne Shaw	18.1	826	830	886	1,318		
Conservative	Patrick Ross-Taylor (incumbent)	17.8	813	815	864	905	927	
Independent	Ed Archer	16.0	729	734	836	874	933	1,406
SNP	George Sutherland (incumbent)	11.4	520	522	551			
Labour	Gordon Muir	9.2	418	511				
Electorate: 11,747 Valid: 4,559 Spoilt: 92 Quota: 1,140 Turnout: 38.8%

=== Clydesdale East ===
The SNP held the seat they had won at the previous election while the Conservatives held one of their two seats and Labour gained one seat from the Conservatives.

Clydesdale East - 3 seats
Party	Candidate	FPv%	Count					
Party	Candidate	FPv%	1	2	3	4	5	6
SNP	Bev Gauld (incumbent) (Note: Clydesdale East SNP councillor Reverend Bev Gauld resigned from the party and became an independent in February 2014 after the party legalised same-sex marriage.)	22.3	936	981	1,013	1,070		
Conservative	Hamish Stewart (incumbent)	19.8	832	882	1,453			
SNP	Ian Donald McAllan	17.7	745	783	810	850	864	
Labour	Ralph Barker	17.3	727	794	824	876	877	1,120
Conservative	John McLatchie	16.5	692	713				
Green	Janet Moxley	6.4	268					
Electorate: 9,815 Valid: 4,200 Spoilt: 65 Quota: 1,051 Turnout: 42.8%

=== Clydesdale South ===
Labour (2) and the SNP (1) retained the seats they had won at the previous election.

Clydesdale South - 3 seats
Party	Candidate	FPv%	Count					
Party	Candidate	FPv%	1	2	3	4	5	6
SNP	Archie Manson (incumbent) (Note: Clydesdale South SNP councillor Archie Manson resigned on 14 March 2014 on health grounds. A by-election was held on 5 June 2014 and won by Labour's Gordon Muir.)	35.0	1,625					
Labour	George Greenshields	24.7	1,149	1,170				
Labour	Alex McInnes (incumbent)	18.8	875	889	894	921	1,044	1,251
Conservative	Colin McGavigan	10.5	487	494	494	562		
SNP	Tom McDonald	6.7	313	704	704	736	852	
UKIP	Chris McEwan	4.3	199	207	207			
Electorate: 11,620 Valid: 4,648 Spoilt: 113 Quota: 1,163 Turnout: 40.0%

=== Avondale and Stonehouse ===
The SNP retained the seat they had won at the previous election and gained a further seat to hold two while Labour held their only seat. Cllr Graeme Campbell, who had been elected as a Conservative in 2007, retained his seat as an independent candidate and the Conservatives lost their only seat. Independent candidate Jim Malloy was elected as a Labour candidate in 2007.

Avondale and Stonehouse - 4 seats
Party	Candidate	FPv%	Count										
Party	Candidate	FPv%	1	2	3	4	5	6	7	8	9	10	11
SNP	Isobel Dorman	21.4	1,148										
SNP	William Holman (incumbent)	16.1	866	923	932	950	993	1,061	1,163				
Labour	Margaret Cooper	12.5	670	673	674	685	698	732	759	764	1,159		
Conservative	Allan Finnie	11.6	624	625	635	642	650	667	719	725	735	740	
Independent	Graeme Campbell (incumbent)	9.4	502	503	505	516	525	581	808	824	853	862	1,100
Labour	John Hamilton	9.2	494	495	495	499	522	565	589	597			
Independent	Lynn Filshie (incumbent)	7.6	409	412	412	429	460	555					
Independent	Jim Malloy (incumbent)	6.3	339	340	340	357	381						
Green	Erica Young	3.4	181	183	185	189							
Independent	Kenny Weir	1.8	94	96	99								
UKIP	Melvyn Donald Randall	0.7	37	37									
Electorate: 12,848 Valid: 5,364 Spoilt: 97 Quota: 1,073 Turnout: 41.8%

=== East Kilbride South ===
The SNP (2) and Labour (1) retained the seats they had won at the previous election.

East Kilbride South - 3 seats
Party	Candidate	FPv%	Count				
Party	Candidate	FPv%	1	2	3	4	5
SNP	Archie Buchanan (incumbent)	40.7	1,725				
Labour	Jim Docherty (incumbent)	28.4	1,203				
SNP	Douglas Edwards (incumbent)	11.2	475	1,021	1,029	1,039	1,061
Labour	Patrick Quigg	8.0	339	378	489	500	514
East Kilbride Alliance	Colin McKay	4.6	193	215	219	226	242
Conservative	Patricia Harrow	3.4	144	151	154	163	168
Solidarity	John Park	2.7	115	124	126	128	
Liberal Democrats	Douglas Herbison	0.9	40	46	48		
Electorate: 11,537 Valid: 4,234 Spoilt: 91 Quota: 1,059 Turnout: 36.7%

=== East Kilbride Central South ===
Labour (2) and the SNP (1) retained the seats they had won at the previous election.

East Kilbride Central South - 3 seats
Party	Candidate	FPv%	Count					
Party	Candidate	FPv%	1	2	3	4	5	6
SNP	John Anderson (incumbent)	38.0	1,721					
Labour	Gerry Convery (incumbent)	35.3	1,598					
Labour	Susan Kerr	12.8	581	614	1,012	1,044	1,108	1,306
SNP	Duncan McLean	6.8	306	795	804	826	860	
Conservative	Isabel Perratt	4.9	223	232	237	254		
Liberal Democrats	Alasdair Sutherland	2.1	95	106	115			
Electorate: 10,854 Valid: 4,524 Spoilt: 133 Quota: 1,132 Turnout: 41.7%

=== East Kilbride Central North ===
The SNP (2) and Labour (2) retained the seats they had won at the previous election.

East Kilbride Central North - 4 seats
Party	Candidate	FPv%	Count							
Party	Candidate	FPv%	1	2	3	4	5	6	7	8
SNP	Anne Maggs (incumbent)	29.3	1,733							
Labour	Alice Marie Mitchell (incumbent)	22.8	1,348							
Labour	Christopher Thompson (incumbent)	18.0	1,065	1,101	1,231					
SNP	Sheena Wardhaugh (incumbent)	9.3	549	973	978	984	994	1,065	1,115	1,374
Green	Kirsten Robb	8.7	516	561	571	580	599	715	820	
Conservative	William Chalmers	6.3	374	378	381	383	386	412		
East Kilbride Alliance	Clare Keane	4.7	277	287	291	293	303			
Solidarity	Richard Foster	0.9	51	53	54	55				
Electorate: 14,005 Valid: 5,913 Spoilt: 104 Quota: 1,183 Turnout: 42.2%

=== East Kilbride West ===
Labour, the SNP and the Conservatives (one each) retained the seats that they had won at the previous election.

East Kilbride West - 3 seats
Party	Candidate	FPv%	Count					
Party	Candidate	FPv%	1	2	3	4	5	6
Conservative	Graham Simpson (incumbent)	25.3	1,197					
SNP	David Watson (incumbent)	24.2	1,148	1,150	1,188			
Labour	Janice McGinlay	17.0	805	806	849	849	975	1,741
Labour	Alan Scott (incumbent)	16.9	800	801	823	823	916	
SNP	John Reilly	12.2	579	580	605	607		
East Kilbride Alliance	Brian Jones	4.5	211	213				
Electorate: 12,092 Valid: 4,740 Spoilt: 44 Quota: 1,186 Turnout: 39.2%

=== East Kilbride East ===
The SNP held the seat they had won at the previous election and gained one seat from Labour while Labour held one of their two seats.

East Kilbride East - 3 seats
Party	Candidate	FPv%	Count				
Party	Candidate	FPv%	1	2	3	4	5
Labour	John Cairney (incumbent)	27.4	1,037				
SNP	Jim Wardhaugh (incumbent)	22.5	853	855	867	913	1,031
SNP	Gladys Miller	21.0	795	798	819	863	977
Labour	Graham Scott (incumbent)	17.7	671	746	766	837	
Conservative	Ian Harrow	8.5	321	323	357		
Liberal Democrats	Nigel Benzies	3.0	112	113			
Electorate: 9,622 Valid: 3,789 Spoilt: 72 Quota: 948 Turnout: 39.4%

=== Rutherglen South ===
Labour, the Liberal Democrats and the SNP retained the seats they had won at the previous election.

Rutherglen South - 3 seats
Party	Candidate	FPv%	Count				
Party	Candidate	FPv%	1	2	3	4	5
Labour	Brian McKenna (incumbent)	26.0	1,244				
Liberal Democrats	Robert Brown	24.7	1,181	1,185	1,213		
SNP	Anne Higgins (incumbent) (Note: Rutherglen South SNP councillor Anne Higgins died on 20 November 2012. A by-election was held on 14 February 2013 and was won by Labour's Gerard Killen which gave the party an overall majority on the council.)	23.9	1,141	1,143	1,151	1,156	1,199
Labour	Gerard Killen	17.8	851	888	914	918	972
Conservative	Richard Tawse	4.9	232	233	269	272	
Scottish Unionist	Michael Haigh	2.7	130	131			
Electorate: 11,153 Valid: 4,779 Spoilt: 72 Quota: 1,195 Turnout: 42.9%

=== Rutherglen Central and North ===
Labour (2) and the SNP (1) retained the seats they had won at the previous election.

Rutherglen Central and North - 3 seats
Party	Candidate	FPv%	Count		
Party	Candidate	FPv%	1	2	3
Labour	Edward McAvoy (incumbent)	40.8	1,571		
SNP	Gordon Clark (incumbent)	23.4	902	928	974
Labour	Denis McKenna (incumbent)	20.2	777	1,300	
Conservative	Jean Miller	5.2	200	205	219
SNP	Michael Hanley	4.1	158	163	176
Scottish Unionist	Jim Nixon	3.8	148	152	166
Liberal Democrats	Tunweer Malik	2.5	97	104	128
Electorate: 10,280 Valid: 3,853 Spoilt: 113 Quota: 964 Turnout: 37.5%

=== Cambuslang West ===
Labour retained the seat they had won at the previous election and gained one seat from the Liberal Democrats while the SNP retained their only seat.

Cambuslang West - 3 seats
Party	Candidate	FPv%	Count					
Party	Candidate	FPv%	1	2	3	4	5	6
Labour	Russell Clearie (incumbent)	34.7	1,669					
SNP	Clare McColl (incumbent)	26.2	1,260					
Liberal Democrats	David Baillie (incumbent)	14.7	707	759	762	836	1,048	
Labour	Richard Tullett (Note: Incumbent for Cambuslang East.)	12.6	606	950	961	1,030	1,065	1,395
Conservative	James MacKay	7.2	344	356	358	388		
Green	Janice Sharkey	4.7	228	245	260			
Electorate: 11,948 Valid: 4,814 Spoilt: 81 Quota: 1,204 Turnout: 40.3%

=== Cambuslang East ===
Labour (2) and the SNP (1) retained the seats they had won at the previous election.

Cambuslang East - 3 seats
Party	Candidate	FPv%	Count		
Party	Candidate	FPv%	1	2	3
Labour	Walter Brogan (incumbent)	43.0	1,554		
SNP	Christine Deanie	23.4	845	876	925
Labour	Pam Clearie (incumbent)	17.5	631	1,177	
SNP	Alistair Fulton	8.6	311	326	340
Conservative	Alan Fraser	5.3	190	195	211
Liberal Democrats	Lindsay Watt	2.2	80	92	118
Electorate: 11,090 Valid: 3,611 Spoilt: 103 Quota: 903 Turnout: 32.6%

=== Blantyre ===
Labour retained both of the seats they had won at the previous election and gained one seat while the SNP retained the seat they had won at the previous election. In 2007, Cllr Bert Thomson was elected as an independent candidate. He retained his seat as an SNP candidate.

Blantyre - 4 seats
Party	Candidate	FPv%	Count									
Party	Candidate	FPv%	1	2	3	4	5	6	7	8	9	10
Labour	Hugh Dunsmuir (incumbent)	25.0	1,144									
SNP	Bert Thomson (incumbent) (Note: Blantyre SNP councillor Bert Thomson defected from the SNP and joined Labour in 2014.)	20.3	929									
Labour	Jim Handibode (incumbent) (Note: Blantyre Labour councillor Jim Handibode died on 19 September 2015. A by-election was held to fill the vacancy on 10 December 2015 and was won by Labour's Mo Razzaq.)	16.6	756	936								
Labour	John McNamee (incumbent)	12.7	579	601	617	617	621	626	639	687	752	844
SNP	John Mullen	10.3	470	472	473	484	486	490	512	542	581	
Independent	Michael Martin	5.1	234	238	239	239	241	260	297	348		
CPA	Michael McGlynn	4.6	209	212	213	214	214	217	253			
Conservative	Isobel Black	3.9	176	179	179	180	188	191				
Independent	Gavin Wallace	0.9	40	41	42	42	45					
Liberal Democrats	Mike Watson	0.7	32	33	33	33						
Electorate: 13,021 Valid: 4,569 Spoilt: 135 Quota: 914 Turnout: 35.1%

=== Bothwell and Uddingston ===
The SNP, Labour and the Conservatives retained the seats they had won at the previous election.

Bothwell and Uddingston - 3 seats
Party	Candidate	FPv%	Count	
Party	Candidate	FPv%	1	2
SNP	Jim McGuigan (incumbent)	35.2	1,342	
Labour	Maureen Devlin (incumbent)	29.5	1,124	
Conservative	Anne Kegg	23.8	906	1,001
Labour	Patrick Morgan	11.5	438	551
Electorate: 9,525 Valid: 3,810 Spoilt: 59 Quota: 953 Turnout: 40.0%

=== Hamilton North and East ===
Labour (2) and the SNP (1) retained the seats they had won at the previous election.

Hamilton North and East - 3 seats
Party	Candidate	FPv%	Count					
Party	Candidate	FPv%	1	2	3	4	5	6
Labour	Davie McLachlan (incumbent)	24.4	1,037	1,045	1,073			
SNP	Lynn Adams (Note: Hamilton North and East SNP councillor Lynn Adams died on 21 September 2015. A by-election was held on 21 January 2016 and it was won by the SNP's Stephanie Callaghan.)	22.2	945	964	994	994	1,044	1,726
Labour	Monica Lennon	18.7	794	808	827	834	893	945
SNP	Barry Douglas (incumbent)	18.2	776	792	803	803	862	
Conservative	Margaret Murray	10.1	430	448	471	471		
Independent	Balarabe Baba	3.3	141	170				
Green	Alasdair Duke	3.1	133					
Electorate: 12,361 Valid: 4,256 Spoilt: 112 Quota: 1,065 Turnout: 34.4%

=== Hamilton West and Earnock ===
Labour (2) and the SNP (1) retained the seats they had won at the previous election while the SNP gained one seat from independent former councillor Tommy Gilligan. Cllr John Menzies was elected following a by-election in 2011 and retained his seat.

Hamilton West and Earnock - 4 seats
Party	Candidate	FPv%	Count		
Party	Candidate	FPv%	1	2	3
Labour	Allan Falconer (incumbent)	27.3	1,170		
SNP	Graeme Horne (incumbent)	26.9	1,153		
Labour	Jean McKeown (incumbent)	20.1	861		
SNP	John Menzies (incumbent)	13.8	592	640	888
Conservative	Connar McBain	8.6	369	387	396
Liberal Democrats	McKenzie Gibson	1.7	74	102	108
UKIP	Rob Sale	1.6	70	95	99
Electorate: 13,853 Valid: 4,289 Spoilt: 77 Quota: 858 Turnout: 31.0%

=== Hamilton South ===
Labour retained both the seats they had won at the previous election while the SNP retained one seat and gained one seat from the Conservatives.

Hamilton South - 4 seats
Party	Candidate	FPv%	Count						
Party	Candidate	FPv%	1	2	3	4	5	6	7
Labour	Joe Lowe (incumbent)	36.6	1,975						
SNP	Angela Crawley (Note: Hamilton South SNP councillor Angela Crawley was elected as MP for Lanark and Hamilton East on 7 May 2015. She resigned her council seat on 22 May 2015. A by-election was held on 6 August 2015 and was won by the SNP's John Ross.)	23.2	1,255						
Labour	Brian McCaig (incumbent)	14.8	800	1,512					
SNP	Bobby Lawson (incumbent) (Note: Hamilton South SNP councillor Bobby Lawson died on 13 August 2013. A by-election was held on 24 October 2013 and was won by Labour's Stuart Gallacher.)	9.3	502	537	599	747	773	861	988
Conservative	John Murray (incumbent)	9.2	496	516	542	545	584	654	
Scottish Senior Citizens	David Holland	3.7	199	234	314	324	380		
Scottish Christian	Craig Smith	3.1	165	176	198	200			
Electorate: 14,383 Valid: 5,392 Spoilt: 134 Quota: 1,079 Turnout: 37.5%

=== Larkhall ===
Labour (2) and the SNP (2) retained the seats they had won at the previous election.

Larkhall - 4 seats
Party	Candidate	FPv%	Count		
Party	Candidate	FPv%	1	2	3
Labour	Jackie Burns (incumbent)	37.4	1,965		
SNP	Peter Craig (incumbent)	21.4	1,124		
SNP	Lesley McDonald (incumbent) (Note: Larkhall councillor Lesley McDonald defected from the SNP and joined Labour on 2 May 2014.)	18.2	958	1,010	1,102
Labour	Andy Carmichael (incumbent)	14.3	752	1,507	
Conservative	David Murray	6.11	321	334	363
UKIP	Donald Murdo MacKay	2.5	131	141	177
Electorate: 14,510 Valid: 5,251 Spoilt: 106 Quota: 1,051 Turnout: 36.2%

== By-elections ==
=== Rutherglen South ===
SNP councillor Anne Higgins died on 20 November 2012. A by-election was held on 14 February 2013 and was won by Labour's Gerard Killen which gave the party an overall majority on the council.

Rutherglen South by-election (14 February 2013) - 1 seat
Party	Candidate	FPv%	Count						
Party	Candidate	FPv%	1	2	3	4	5	6	7
Labour	Gerard Killen	39.9	1,352	1,358	1,370	1,376	1,396	1,616	2,090
Liberal Democrats	David Baillie	29.5	999	1,004	1,016	1,035	1,104	1,278	
SNP	Margaret Ferrier	21.0	712	714	730	741	755		
Conservative	Aric Gilinisky	3.8	128	133	134	170			
UKIP	Donald Murdo MacKay	3.3	111	115	120				
Green	Susan Martin	1.7	59	60					
Independent	Craig Smith	0.9	31						
Electorate: 12,919 Valid: 3,392 Spoilt: 46 Quota: 1,697 Turnout: 26.6%

=== Hamilton South 2013 ===
SNP councillor Bobby Lawson died on 13 August 2013. A by-election was held on 24 October 2013 and was won by Labour's Stuart Gallacher.

Hamilton South by-election (24 October 2013) - 1 seat
Party	Candidate	FPv%	Count
Party	Candidate	FPv%	1
Labour	Stuart Gallacher	51.7	1,781
SNP	Josh Wilson	32.5	1,120
Conservative	Lynne Nailon	9.4	322
Scottish Christian	Craig Martin	3.9	133
UKIP	Josh Richardson	2.5	86
Electorate: 14,478 Valid: 3,442 Spoilt: 43 Quota: 1,722 Turnout: 24.1%

=== Clydesdale South ===
SNP councillor Archie Manson resigned on 14 March 2014 on health grounds. A by-election was held on 5 June 2014 and won by Labour's Gordon Muir.

Clydesdale South by-election (5 June 2014) - 1 seat
Party	Candidate	FPv%	Count				
Party	Candidate	FPv%	1	2	3	4	5
Labour	Gordon Muir	40.8	1,492	1,512	1,559	1,819	2,366
SNP	George Sneddon	32.0	1,170	1,203	1,260	1,356	
Conservative	Donna Hood	18.0	659	674	744		
UKIP	Donald MacKay	6.4	233	247			
Green	Ruth Thomas	2.8	104				
Electorate: 11,979 Valid: 3,658 Spoilt: 52 Quota: 1,830 Turnout: 31.0%

=== Hamilton South 2015 ===
SNP councillor Angela Crawley was elected as MP for Lanark and Hamilton East on 7 May 2015. She resigned her council seat on 22 May 2015. A by-election was held on 6 August 2015 and was won by the SNP's John Ross.

Hamilton South by-election (6 August 2015) - 1 seat
Party	Candidate	FPv%	Count					
Party	Candidate	FPv%	1	2	3	4	5	6
SNP	John Ross	48.0	1,881	1,883	1,888	1,905	1919	1,988
Labour	Jim Lee	35.6	1,396	1,398	1,405	1,410	1,425	1,460
Conservative	Lynne Nailon	8.9	349	349	354	365	389	394
Green	John Kane	3.2	127	128	132	135	146	
Scottish Christian	Craig Smith	2.0	77	80	81	84		
UKIP	Donald Murdo MacKay	1.1	43	44	45			
Liberal Democrats	Matthew Cockburn	0.8	32	34				
Pirate	Andrew McCallum	0.3	13					
Electorate: 14,811 Valid: 3,918 Spoilt: 52 Quota: 1,960 Turnout: 26.8%

=== Blantyre ===
Labour councillor Jim Handibode died on 19 September 2015. A by-election was held to fill the vacancy on 10 December 2015 and was won by Labour's Mo Razzaq.

Blantyre by-election (10 December 2015) - 1 seat
Party	Candidate	FPv%	Count				
Party	Candidate	FPv%	1	2	3	4	5
Labour	Mo Razzaq	47.2	1,476	1,483	1,504	1,536	1,589
SNP	Gerry Chambers	39.6	1,236	1,246	1,259	1,314	1,327
Conservative	Taylor Muir	4.5	140	156	172	173	
Scottish Socialist	Sean Baillie	3.9	122	125	133		
Liberal Democrats	Stephen Reid	2.9	92	97			
UKIP	Emma Jay Docherty	1.9	59				
Electorate: 13,745 Valid: 3,125 Spoilt: 45 Quota: 1,563 Turnout: 23.1%

=== Hamilton North and East ===
SNP councillor Lynn Adams died on 21 September 2015. A by-election was held on 21 January 2016 to fill the vacancy, won by the party's Stephanie Callaghan.

Hamilton North and East by-election (21 January 2016) - 1 seat
Party	Candidate	FPv%	Count				
Party	Candidate	FPv%	1	2	3	4	5
SNP	Stephanie Callaghan	42.9	1,089	1,096	1,138	1,206	1,569
Labour	Lyndsay Clelland	33.6	855	861	878	1,052	
Conservative	James MacKay	18.5	469	480	485		
Green	Steven Hannigan	3.3	83	90			
Liberal Democrats	Norman Rae	1.8	45				
Electorate: 12,423 Valid: 2,541 Spoilt: 31 Quota: 1,271 Turnout: 20.2%
