= East Kilbride South (ward) =

Electoral ward in South Lanarkshire, Scotland

- South Lanarkshire
- Boundary of East Kilbride South in South Lanarkshire from 2007–2017.
- Population: 16,985 (2021)
- Electorate: 12,589 (2022)
- Major settlements: East Kilbride (part of)
- Scottish Parliament constituency: East Kilbride; Clydesdale
- Scottish Parliament region: Central Scotland
- UK Parliament constituency: East Kilbride and Strathaven

Current ward
- Created: 2007
- Number of councillors: 3
- Councillor: Archie Buchanan (SNP)
- Councillor: Mathew Buchanan (Labour)
- Councillor: Geri Gray (SNP)
- Created from: Greenhills; Hairmyres/Crosshouse; Heatheryknowe; Lindsay; Westwoodhill; Whitehills

East Kilbride South is one of the 20 electoral wards of South Lanarkshire Council. Created in 2007, the ward elects three councillors using the single transferable vote electoral system and covers an area with a population of 16,985 people.

The ward is a Scottish National Party (SNP) stronghold with the party holding two of the three seats at every election since the ward was created.

== Boundaries ==
The ward was created following the Fourth Statutory Reviews of Electoral Arrangements ahead of the 2007 Scottish local elections. As a result of the Local Governance (Scotland) Act 2004, local elections in Scotland would use the single transferable vote electoral system from 2007 onwards so East Kilbride South was formed from an amalgamation of several previous first-past-the-post wards. It contained part of the former Hairmyres/Crosshouse, Heatheryknowe, Lindsay and Westwoodhill wards as well as all of the former Greenhills and Whitehills wards. East Kilbride South covers a primarily urban area in southern East Kilbride including the Greenhills, Lindsayfield and Whitehills neighbourhoods. Following the Fifth Statutory Reviews of Electoral Arrangements ahead of the 2017 Scottish local elections, a few streets around Owen Avenue/Dale Avenue (generally considered to belong to The Murray neighbourhood) were transferred to the East Kilbride Central South ward and a corridor of farmland north of the White Cart Water previously part of the Avondale and Stonehouse ward was added.

== Councillors ==
Year	Councillors		
2007	Archie Buchanan (SNP)	Douglas Edwards (SNP)	Jim Docherty (Labour)
2012	Archie Buchanan (SNP)	Douglas Edwards (SNP)	Jim Docherty (Labour)
2017	Archie Buchanan (SNP)	Geri Gray (SNP)	Fiona Dryburgh (Labour/Lib Dem)
2019	Archie Buchanan (SNP)	Geri Gray (SNP)	Fiona Dryburgh (Labour/Lib Dem)
2022	Archie Buchanan (SNP)	Geri Gray (SNP)	Mathew Buchanan (Labour)

== Election results ==
=== 2022 election ===
East Kilbride South - 3 seats
Party	Candidate	FPv%	Count								
Party	Candidate	FPv%	1	2	3	4	5	6	7	8	9
SNP	Archie Buchanan (incumbent)	36.9	1,948								
Labour	Mathew Buchanan	23.0	1,215	1,272	1,282	1,286	1,300	1,335			
Liberal Democrats	Paul McGarry	13.7	722	738	748	750	757	782	787	1,042	
SNP	Geri Gray (incumbent)	11.8	621	1,103	1,106	1,130	1,136	1,220	1,222	1,235	1,453
Conservative	Patrick Nailon	8.7	458	461	463	467	486	490	492		
Scottish Green	John McKechnie	2.9	154	180	182	192	198				
Scottish Family	Jonathan Richardson	1.3	68	70	72	79					
Alba	Iain Leckenby	1.1	57	63	63						
Scottish Libertarian	Ross Gibson	0.6	31	34							
Electorate: 12,589 Valid: 5,274 Spoilt: 111 Quota: 1,319 Turnout: 42.8%

=== 2017 election ===
East Kilbride South - 3 seats
Party	Candidate	FPv%	Count						
Party	Candidate	FPv%	1	2	3	4	5	6	7
SNP	Archie Buchanan (incumbent)	40.5	2,119						
Labour	Fiona Dryburgh (Note: On 12 August 2019, East Kilbride South Labour councillor Fiona Dryburgh resigned from the party and joined the Liberal Democrats in opposition to Labour voicing support for a second Scottish independence referendum.)	19.7	1,030	1,104	1,109	1,122	1,145	1,303	1,327
Conservative	Alexandra Herdman	14.8	773	779	801	806	812	949	952
SNP	Geri Gray	10.9	572	1,196	1,205	1,233	1,293	1,380	
Liberal Democrats	Paul McGarry	9.7	506	526	531	540	552		
Scottish Green	Ruth Thomas	2.0	104	127	129	145			
Solidarity	John Park	1.4	73	82	86				
UKIP	Conner Campbell	1.0	50	59					
Electorate: 12,335 Valid: 5,227 Spoilt: 114 Quota: 1,307 Turnout: 43.3%

=== 2012 election ===
East Kilbride South - 3 seats
Party	Candidate	FPv%	Count				
Party	Candidate	FPv%	1	2	3	4	5
SNP	Archie Buchanan (incumbent)	40.7	1,725				
Labour	Jim Docherty (incumbent)	28.4	1,203				
SNP	Douglas Edwards (incumbent)	11.2	475	1,021	1,029	1,039	1,061
Labour	Patrick Quigg	8.0	339	378	489	500	514
East Kilbride Alliance	Colin McKay	4.6	193	215	219	226	242
Conservative	Patricia Harrow	3.4	144	151	154	163	168
Solidarity	John Park	2.7	115	124	126	128	
Liberal Democrats	Douglas Herbison	0.9	40	46	48		
Electorate: 11,537 Valid: 4,234 Spoilt: 91 Quota: 1,059 Turnout: 36.7%

=== 2007 election ===
East Kilbride South - 3 seats
Party	Candidate	FPv%	Count							
Party	Candidate	FPv%	1	2	3	4	5	6	7	8
SNP	Archie Buchanan (Note: Returning councillor for Greenhills single-member ward.)	42.7	2,431							
Labour	Jim Docherty (Note: Returning councillor for Whitehills single-member ward.)	33.3	1,900							
East Kilbride Alliance	Colin McKay	6.3	358	413	466	478	506	585	???	
Conservative	Gillian Alexander	6.2	356	394	429	454	441	460		
SNP	Douglas Edwards	5.2	294	878	941	956	1,014	1,101	???	???
Scottish Green	Drew Campbell	2.9	167	222	272	291	323			
Solidarity	John Park	2.3	129	167	194	224				
Scottish Socialist	Lynsey MacGregor	1.1	63	85	107					
Electorate: 11,701 Valid: 5,698 Quota: 1,425 Turnout: 49.5%
