= Hamilton North and East (ward) =

Electoral ward in South Lanarkshire, Scotland

- South Lanarkshire
- Boundary of Hamilton North and East in South Lanarkshire from 2007–2017.
- Population: 15,004 (2021)
- Electorate: 12,036 (2022)
- Major settlements: Hamilton (part of)
- Scottish Parliament constituency: Hamilton, Larkhall and Stonehouse; Uddingston and Bellshill
- Scottish Parliament region: Central Scotland
- UK Parliament constituency: Hamilton and Clyde Valley

Current ward
- Created: 2007
- Number of councillors: 3
- Councillor: Davie McLachlan (Labour)
- Councillor: Colin Dewar (SNP)
- Councillor: Martin Hose (Conservative)
- Created from: Burnbank/Blantyre; Hamilton Centre/Ferniegair; Hamilton Centre North; Udston; Wellhall/Earnock; Whitehill

Hamilton North and East is one of the 20 electoral wards of South Lanarkshire Council. Created in 2007, the ward elects three councillors using the single transferable vote electoral system and covers an area with a population of 15,004 people.

The ward was previously a Labour stronghold with the party holding two of the three seats between 2007 and 2017. However, it has since become split between Labour, the Scottish National Party (SNP) and the Conservatives with each party holding one seat since 2017.

== Boundaries ==
The ward was created following the Fourth Statutory Reviews of Electoral Arrangements ahead of the 2007 Scottish local elections. As a result of the Local Governance (Scotland) Act 2004, local elections in Scotland would use the single transferable vote electoral system from 2007 onwards so Hamilton North and East was formed from an amalgamation of several previous first-past-the-post wards. It contained all of the former Whitehill ward, the majority of the former Hamilton Centre/Ferniegair ward and part of the former Burnbank/Blantyre and Hamilton Centre North wards as well as a small part of the former Udston and Wellhall/Earnock ward. Hamilton North and East covers the northern and eastern parts of Hamilton including the town centre, Barncluith, Burnbank, Chantinghall, Hamilton West and Whitehill, plus the separate village of Ferniegair/Allanton. The River Clyde forms the ward's eastern boundary, coinciding with the council's border with North Lanarkshire Council, and the Avon Water forms the ward's southwestern boundary. Following the Fifth Statutory Reviews of Electoral Arrangements ahead of the 2017 Scottish local elections, streets south of the town centre between Portland Place, Burnblea Street and Kemp Street were transferred to Hamilton South while streets around Ballantrae Road were transferred into the ward from Blantyre.

== Councillors ==
Election	Councillors		
2007	David McLachlan (Labour)	Mary Smith (Labour)	Barry Douglas (SNP)
2012	David McLachlan (Labour)	Monica Lennon (Labour)	Lynn Adams (SNP)
2016 by-election	David McLachlan (Labour)	Monica Lennon (Labour)	Stephanie Callaghan (SNP)
2017	David McLachlan (Labour)	Martin Hose (Conservative)	Stephanie Callaghan (SNP)
2022	David McLachlan (Labour)	Martin Hose (Conservative)	Colin Dewar (SNP)

== Election results ==
=== 2022 election ===
Hamilton North and East - 3 seats
Party	Candidate	FPv%	Count					
Party	Candidate	FPv%	1	2	3	4	5	6
Labour	Davie McLachlan (incumbent)	32.4	1,539					
SNP	Colin Dewar	30.3	1,442					
Conservative	Martin Hose (incumbent)	19.0	902	965	968	989	1,109	1,304
SNP	Phil Sykes	10.5	501	552	772	805	876	
Liberal Democrats	Andrew Reynolds	5.2	249	348	355	396		
Independent	Balarabe Baba	2.6	124	150	154			
Electorate: 12,036 Valid: 4,757 Spoilt: 109 Quota: 1,190 Turnout: 40.4%

=== 2017 election ===
Hamilton North and East - 3 seats
Party	Candidate	FPv%	Count					
Party	Candidate	FPv%	1	2	3	4	5	6
Conservative	Martin Hose	26.5	1,268					
SNP	Stephanie Callaghan (incumbent)	25.1	1,201					
Labour	Davie McLachlan (incumbent) (Note: In January 2018, Hamilton North and East Labour councillor Davie McLachlan was suspended from the party after allegedly making a racist remark about Anas Sarwar. Following an investigation, he was cleared of any wrongdoing and the suspension was lifted.)	23.6	1,128	1,144	1,144	1,158	1,180	1,239
SNP	Jason Douglas	10.9	521	522	525	541	603	633
Labour	Nina Reeves	6.2	296	301	301	305	320	343
Liberal Democrats	David Bennie	2.9	137	152	152	177	207	
Scottish Green	Steven Hannigan	3.2	152	154	154	165		
Independent	Balarabe Baba	1.8	87	94	94			
Electorate: 11,600 Valid: 4,790 Spoilt: 94 Quota: 1,198 Turnout: 42.1%

=== 2016 by-election ===
Hamilton North and East by-election (21 January 2016) - 1 seat
Party	Candidate	FPv%	Count				
Party	Candidate	FPv%	1	2	3	4	5
SNP	Stephanie Callaghan	42.9	1,089	1,096	1,138	1,206	1,569
Labour	Lyndsay Clelland	33.6	855	861	878	1,052	
Conservative	James MacKay	18.5	469	480	485		
Scottish Green	Steven Hannigan	3.3	83	90			
Liberal Democrats	Norman Rae	1.8	45				
Electorate: 12,423 Valid: 2,541 Spoilt: 31 Quota: 1,271 Turnout: 20.2%

=== 2012 election ===
Hamilton North and East - 3 seats
Party	Candidate	FPv%	Count					
Party	Candidate	FPv%	1	2	3	4	5	6
Labour	Davie McLachlan (incumbent)	24.4	1,037	1,045	1,073			
SNP	Lynn Adams (Note: Hamilton North and East SNP councillor Lynn Adams died on 21 September 2015. A by-election was held on 21 January 2016 and it was won by the SNP's Stephanie Callaghan.)	22.2	945	964	994	994	1,044	1,726
Labour	Monica Lennon	18.7	794	808	827	834	893	945
SNP	Barry Douglas (incumbent)	18.2	776	792	803	803	862	
Conservative	Margaret Murray	10.1	430	448	471	471		
Independent	Balarabe Baba	3.3	141	170				
Scottish Green	Alasdair Duke	3.1	133					
Electorate: 12,361 Valid: 4,256 Spoilt: 112 Quota: 1,065 Turnout: 34.4%

=== 2007 election ===
Hamilton North and East - 3 seats
Party	Candidate	FPv%	Count					
Party	Candidate	FPv%	1	2	3	4	5	6
SNP	Barry Douglas	31.3	1,769					
Labour	David McLachlan	23.6	1,335	1,382	1,401	1,456		
Labour	Mary Smith (Note: Returning councillor for Hamilton Centre/Ferniegair single-member ward.)	21.6	1,221	1,255	1,273	1,305	???	???
Conservative	Andrew Leitch	16.2	917	974	990	1,112	???	
Independent	James Ward	3.8	214	246				
Independent	Hugh Clements	3.4	190	251	394			
Electorate: 12,084 Valid: 5,646 Quota: 1,412 Turnout: 48.0%
