= Bothwell and Uddingston (ward) =

Electoral ward in South Lanarkshire, Scotland

- South Lanarkshire
- Boundary of Bothwell and Uddingston in South Lanarkshire from 2007–2017.
- Population: 13,261 (2021)
- Electorate: 10,818 (2022)
- Major settlements: Bothwell; Uddingston
- Scottish Parliament constituency: Uddingston and Bellshill
- Scottish Parliament region: Central Scotland
- UK Parliament constituency: Rutherglen

Current ward
- Created: 2007
- Number of councillors: 3
- Councillor: Maureen Devlin (Labour)
- Councillor: Kenny McCreary (Conservative)
- Councillor: Cal Johnston-Dempsey (SNP)
- Created from: Bothwell South; Uddingston; Uddingston South/Bothwell

Bothwell and Uddingston is one of the 20 electoral wards of South Lanarkshire Council. Created in 2007, the ward elects three councillors using the single transferable vote electoral system and covers an area with a population of 13,261 people.

The ward has politically been split between Labour, the Scottish National Party (SNP) and the Conservatives with each party holding one seat at every election since the ward's creation.

== Boundaries ==
The ward was created following the Fourth Statutory Reviews of Electoral Arrangements ahead of the 2007 Scottish local elections. As a result of the Local Governance (Scotland) Act 2004, local elections in Scotland would use the single transferable vote electoral system from 2007 onwards so Bothwell and Uddingston was formed from an amalgamation of several previous first-past-the-post wards. It contained all of the former Bothwell South, Uddingston and Uddingston South/Bothwell wards. As its name suggests, Bothwell and Uddingston centres on the towns of Bothwell and Uddingston bounded by the River Clyde to the west and south, and the M74 motorway to the north and east. Bothwell and Uddingston is located in the north of South Lanarkshire with its northwestern boundary coinciding with the council's border with Glasgow City Council and its eastern boundary coinciding with the council's border with North Lanarkshire Council. Following the Fifth Statutory Reviews of Electoral Arrangements ahead of the 2017 Scottish local elections, the ward's boundaries were unchanged.

== Councillors ==
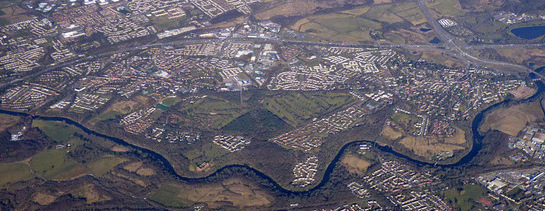
Aerial view of the ward from the south-west

Election	Councillors		
2007	Maureen Devlin (Labour)	Henry Mitchell (Conservative)	James McGuigan (SNP)
2012	Maureen Devlin (Labour)	Anne Kegg (Conservative)	James McGuigan (SNP)
2017	Maureen Devlin (Labour)	Kenny McCreary (Conservative)	James McGuigan (SNP)
2022	Maureen Devlin (Labour)	Kenny McCreary (Conservative)	Cal Johnston-Dempsey (SNP)

== Election results ==
=== 2022 election ===
Bothwell and Uddingston - 3 seats
Party	Candidate	FPv%	Count					
Party	Candidate	FPv%	1	2	3	4	5	6
Labour	Maureen Devlin (incumbent)	30.3	1,633					
Conservative	Kenny McCreary (incumbent)	27.6	1,485					
SNP	Cal Dempsey	17.2	924	947	949	1,008	1,099	1,913
SNP	Jim McGuigan (incumbent)	15.1	811	844	848	941	994	
Liberal Democrats	Troy Davidson	5.3	285	397	469	539		
Green	John Stubbs	4.5	243	275	280			
Electorate: 10,818 Valid: 5,381 Spoilt: 74 Quota: 1,346 Turnout: 50.4%

=== 2017 election ===
Bothwell and Uddingston - 3 seats
Party	Candidate	FPv%	Count				
Party	Candidate	FPv%	1	2	3	4	5
Conservative	Kenny McCreary	35.3	1,851				
Labour	Maureen Devlin (incumbent)	26.0	1,362				
SNP	Jim McGuigan (incumbent)	21.6	1,132	1,150	1,158	1,219	1,550
Liberal Democrats	Colin Robb	8.6	450	701	718	757	774
SNP	Phil Sykes	6.6	347	353	355	369	
Green	James Ferguson	2.0	106	134	140		
Electorate: 10,351 Valid: 5,248 Spoilt: 52 Quota: 1,313 Turnout: 51.2%

=== 2012 election ===
Bothwell and Uddingston - 3 seats
Party	Candidate	FPv%	Count	
Party	Candidate	FPv%	1	2
SNP	Jim McGuigan (incumbent)	35.2	1,342	
Labour	Maureen Devlin (incumbent)	29.5	1,124	
Conservative	Anne Kegg	23.8	906	1,001
Labour	Patrick Morgan	11.5	438	551
Electorate: 9,525 Valid: 3,810 Spoilt: 59 Quota: 953 Turnout: 40.0%

=== 2007 election ===
Bothwell and Uddingston - 3 seats
Party	Candidate	FPv%	Count						
Party	Candidate	FPv%	1	2	3	4	5	6	7
Conservative	Henry Mitchell (Note: Returning councillor for Bothwell South single-member ward.)	30.0	1,615						
Labour	Maureen Devlin (Note: Returning councillor for Whitehill single-member ward.)	24.0	1,292	1,315	1,329	1,347			
SNP	Jim McGuigan	18.6	998	1,032	1,089	1,120	1,120	1,324	???
Labour	Pat Morgan (Note: Returning councillor for Uddingston single-member ward.)	12.9	696	709	721	739	741	861	
Liberal Democrats	Douglas Herbison	8.9	477	553	562	633	634		
Green	Kenneth Robb	3.1	168	187	214				
Solidarity	Denis Reilly	2.5	132	135					
Electorate: 9,788 Valid: 5,378 Quota: 1,345 Turnout: 55.8%
