= Richard Lyle =

Scottish National Party Member of the Scottish Parliament

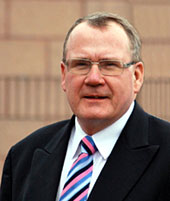

Member of the Scottish Parliament for Uddingston and Bellshill
- In office 5 May 2016 – 5 May 2021
- Preceded by: Michael McMahon
- Succeeded by: Stephanie Callaghan

Member of the Scottish Parliament for Central Scotland region
- In office 5 May 2011 – 24 March 2016

Member of North Lanarkshire for Bellshill Orbiston (1995–2007)
- In office 7 April 1995 – 4 May 2012
- Preceded by: Constituency established
- Succeeded by: Marina Lyle

Member of Motherwell district council for Orbiston Belshill South (1977–1984)
- In office 1977–1996
- Preceded by: F. Fergusson
- Succeeded by: Constituency abolished

Personal details
- Born: 12 June 1950 (age 76) Bothwellhaugh, Scotland
- Party: Scottish National Party

Richard Macdonald Lyle (born 12 June 1950) is a retired Scottish National Party (SNP) politician. He served as the Member of the Scottish Parliament (MSP) for the Uddingston and Bellshill constituency from 2016 to 2021, having previously represented the Central Scotland region from 2011 to 2016.

Before becoming an MSP, Lyle was a North Lanarkshire councillor for 30 years.

== Early life ==
Lyle was born in Bothwellhaugh, Lanarkshire and educated at Lawmuir School and Bellshill Academy.

He worked for the Royal Bank of Scotland before entering politics.

== Career ==
Lyle joined the SNP in 1966 and served as a local councillor on Motherwell District Council and North Lanarkshire Council for 35 years, including the Bellshill ward from 2007 to 2011. At the 2011 Scottish Parliament election, Lyle won election as an MSP for the Central Scotland region.

During a debate on same-sex marriage in Scotland in August 2011, Lyle and with his SNP colleagues Dave Thompson, John Mason and Bill Walker were widely condemned for raising a motion stating that no person or organisation should be forced to be involved or to approve of same-sex marriage.

Lyle was at the center of an internal party dispute within the SNP Uddingston and Bellshill branch in February 2016, during which a small minority of party members state that they would refuse to vote for him at the then upcoming Scottish Parliament election. It was revealed during the lead up to the election that Lyle's Holyrood nickname is "Salty Dick" after it became public knowledge that he had once claimed the cost of a £1.80 bag of chips on expenses.

In February 2020, Lyle announced that he would not be seeking re-election at the 2021 Scottish Parliament election. "The 2014 referendum was amazing and seeing the huge change in the number of people supporting independence and I will continue to fly the flag for independence," he told The National. "But the saddest day of my life though was when untruths about my branch, about myself and about the people I know. Being called Don Corelone hurt me and hurt my wife. I am not Don Corelone."

He was also the deputy convener of the cross-party Building Bridges with Israel group; he visited Israel and the occupied territories in 2018, a trip that was valued at £2,200 and was paid for by the Israeli embassy in London. In May 2020, a motion marking the 72nd anniversary of the Nakba—the exodus of Palestinians from their homeland in 1948—was tabled by fellow SNP MSP Sandra White. The Morning Star revealed that Lyle had tried to attach an amendment to the motion in which he called the tragedy "self-inflicted".

"20% of Israel's citizens are Arabs who chose not to flee in 1948, and who enjoy their democratic rights in Israel and contribute meaningfully to Israel society at all levels, including membership of the Knesset, with several Arabs serving as high ranking members of the Israel police and army. The conclusion can only be that the [Nakba], the Arabic word for tragedy, resulting in the 1948 Palestine refugee crisis was sadly a self-inflicted tragedy, which must, after all these years, be finally resolved by peaceful means and discussions between the parties involved."

Nadia El-Nakla, convenor of SNP Friends of Palestine, said Lyle's remarks were "not just a revision of history but also an insult to every Palestinian worldwide" and called on the SNP to discipline him. "If we in Scotland can’t have a constructive dialogue and examine the arguments from both sides, what chance have the warring sides after 72 years of conflict," Lyle said in a statement. I implore the Palestinian and Jewish peoples to sit down and negotiate a two-state solution and end the bloodshed."

On 15 November 2020, after nearly 45 years as a councillor and MSP, Lyle announced his retirement from politics in an interview with the Daily Record. "This next year will mark 45 years as a politician. And next year I will be 71 years of age. [...] I'm proud to have served as a councillor and as a Member of the Scottish Parliament – and to have served local people for over 40 years. I have enjoyed the opportunity to help influence and shape the changes we need to see from the council's Labour administration. I always encourage everyone who tells me they wish to be a politician to get involved and to go for it. Being a politician is not an easy task, it requires sacrifice and intense scrutiny, it requires hard work like any other role, but it is incredibly rewarding to serve local people and I am proud to have had the chance to do just that."

After leaving Holyrood, Lyle became a lobbyist for Invicta Public Affairs. In March 2024, he was accused of breaking parliamentary rules by using a special pass given to ex-members to lobby for Invicta.

== Personal life ==
Lyle and his wife, Marion have two children, Vincent and Marina. Marina is also a former councillor for the Bellshill ward, replacing her father in 2012 and serving until 2017.

Scottish Parliament
Preceded by Michael McMahon	MSP for Uddingston and Bellshill; 2016 – 2021	Succeeded by Stephanie Callaghan
