= Michael McMahon (Scottish politician) =

British politician (born 1961)

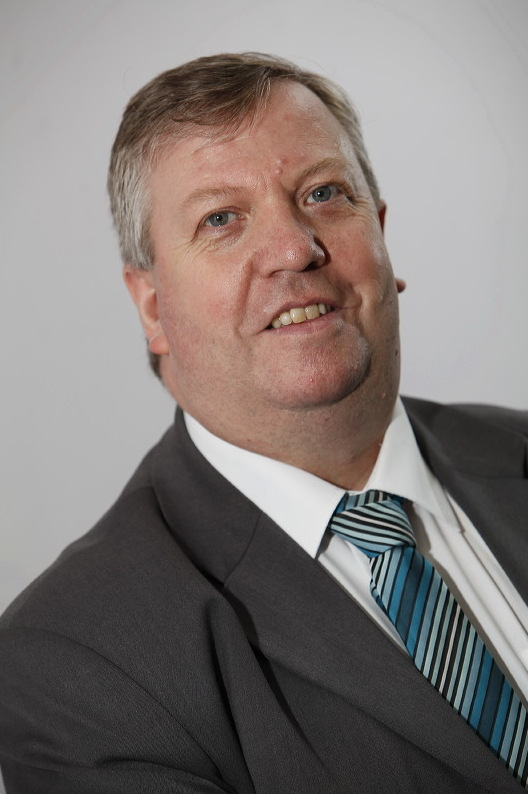
- McMahon in 2011

Member of the Scottish Parliament for Uddingston and Bellshill Hamilton North and Bellshill (1999–2011)
- In office 6 May 1999 – 24 March 2016
- Preceded by: Constituency established
- Succeeded by: Richard Lyle

Personal details
- Born: 18 September 1961 (age 64) Lanarkshire, Scotland
- Party: Scottish Labour Party

Michael Joseph McMahon (born 18 September 1961) is a former Scottish Labour Party politician. He was a Member of the Scottish Parliament (MSP) from 1999 until 2016. He was MSP for the Hamilton North and Bellshill constituency from 1999 until its abolition in 2011, and then for the Uddingston and Bellshill constituency from 2011 to 2016.

== Career ==
McMahon attended the co-educational, Roman Catholic Our Lady's High School, Motherwell from 1973 until 1977. After leaving school, he worked as a welder at Terex Equipment Ltd, Motherwell from 1977 until 1992. He had been a trade union activist since school, and was Chair of the Youth Committees for the GMB trade union and the Scottish Trades Union Congress. In the GMB, he was also the branch Equality Officer and a member of the Racial Advisory Committee.

== Political positions and views ==
McMahon is a critic of the not proven verdict in Scottish law, unsuccessfully attempting to abolish the verdict in 2007.

McMahon is a supporter of faith schools and has publicly defended them, claiming there is no evidence they contribute to sectarianism.

McMahon was one of three Labour MSPs that voted against the Marriage and Civil Partnership (Scotland) Act 2014.

== Personal life ==
McMahon is married to Margaret, and together they have three children. He employed her as his parliamentary assistant and his daughter Siobhan McMahon as his parliamentary researcher, with the latter becoming an MSP herself in the 2011 Scottish Parliament election.

Scottish Parliament
New constituency	Member of the Scottish Parliament for Uddingston and Bellshill; 2011–2016	Incumbent
New constituency	Member of the Scottish Parliament for Hamilton North and Bellshill; 1999–2011	Constituency abolished
