= Uddingston and Bellshill =

Region or constituency of the Scottish Parliament

- Burgh constituency for the Scottish Parliament
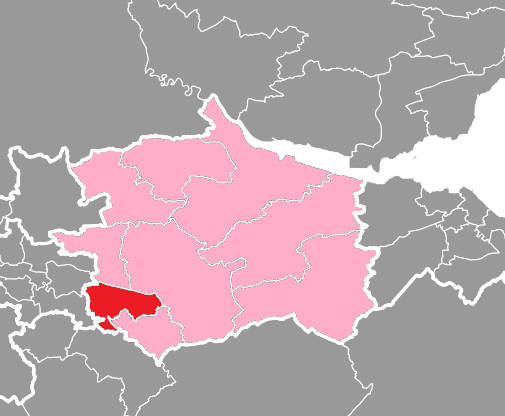

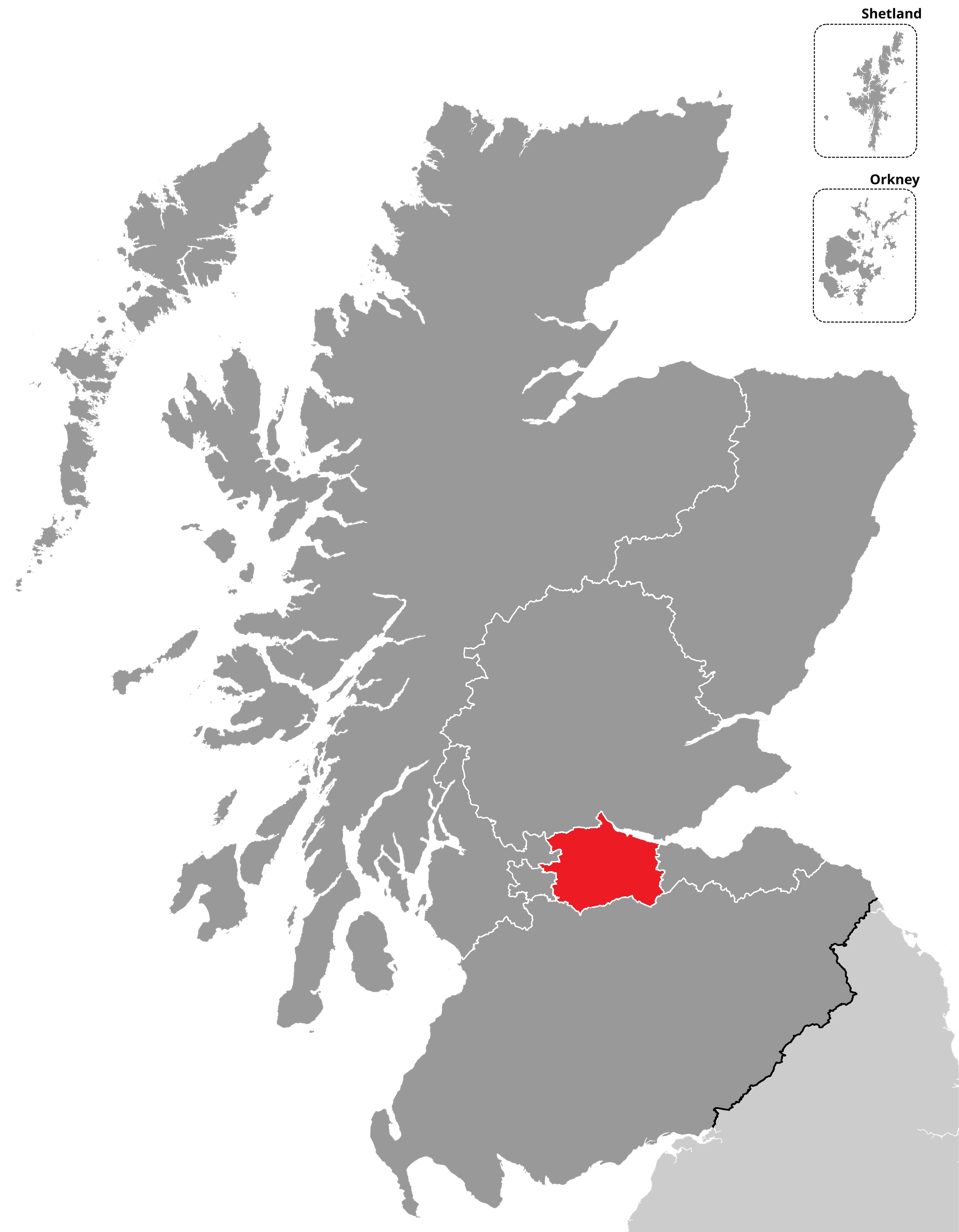
- Uddingston and Bellshill shown within the Central Scotland and Lothians West electoral region, and the region shown within Scotland
- Electoral region: Central Scotland and Lothians West
- Electorate: 59,248 (2026)

Current constituency
- Created: 2011
- Party: SNP
- MSP: Steven Bonnar
- Council area: North Lanarkshire; South Lanarkshire

Uddingston and Bellshill is a burgh constituency of the Scottish Parliament covering part of the council areas of North Lanarkshire and South Lanarkshire. It elects one Member of the Scottish Parliament (MSP) by the plurality (first past the post) method of election. Under the additional-member electoral system used for elections to the Scottish Parliament, it is also one of nine constituencies in the Central Scotland and Lothians West electoral region, which elects seven additional members, in addition to nine constituency MSPs, to produce a form of proportional representation for the region as a whole.

The constituency was formed for the 2011 Scottish Parliament election, and comprises parts of the former seat of Hamilton North and Bellshill, along with areas that were formerly in the seat of Motherwell and Wishaw. The seat underwent slight boundary changes as a result of second periodic review of Scottish Parliament boundaries, ahead of the 2026 Scottish Parliament election. It has been held by Stephanie Callaghan of the Scottish National Party since the 2021 Scottish Parliament election.

== Electoral region ==
The other eight constituencies of the Central Scotland and Lothians West region are Airdrie, Almond Valley, Bathgate, Coatbridge and Chryston, Cumbernauld and Kilsyth, Falkirk East and Linlithgow, Falkirk West, and Motherwell and Wishaw. The region covers all of the Falkirk, North Lanarkshire and West Lothian council areas, and parts of the South Lanarkshire council area.

Prior to the second periodic review of Scottish Parliament boundaries in 2025, Uddingston and Bellshill was part of the Central Scotland electoral region. The other nine constituencies of this region were: Airdrie and Shotts, Coatbridge and Chryston, Cumbernauld and Kilsyth, East Kilbride, Falkirk East, Falkirk West, Hamilton, Larkhall and Stonehouse and Motherwell and Wishaw. The region covered all of the Falkirk council area, all of the North Lanarkshire council area and part of the South Lanarkshire council area.

== Constituency boundaries and council areas ==
Map of boundaries (2011-2026)

On the 2011 boundaries, the Uddingston and Bellshill Holyrood constituency was one of five covering the North Lanarkshire council area, the others being Airdrie and Shotts, Coatbridge and Chryston, Cumbernauld and Kilsyth and Motherwell and Wishaw. All five are within the Central Scotland electoral region. Part of the constituency includes territory within South Lanarkshire; it is one of five covering the South Lanarkshire council area, the others being Hamilton, Larkhall and Stonehouse and East Kilbride which are within the Central Scotland region, Rutherglen within the Glasgow region, and Clydesdale within the South Scotland region.

At the 2011 Scottish Parliament election, the constituency of Uddingston and Bellshill was fought for the first time. It was created from the electoral wards below:

- North Lanarkshire:
  - Thorniewood (whole ward)
  - Bellshill (whole ward)
  - Mossend and Holytown (whole ward)
  - Motherwell North (shared with Motherwell and Wishaw)
- South Lanarkshire:
  - Bothwell and Uddingston (whole ward)
  - Blantyre (shared with Rutherglen)
  - Hamilton North and East (shared with Hamilton, Larkhall and Stonehouse)

Since 2026, the seat has continued to be one of five covering the North Lanarkshire council area: one of the others is the new Airdrie seat, alongside slightly altered version of the Coatbridge and Chryston, Cumbernauld and Kilsyth, and Motherwell and Wishaw seats. All five now lie within the Central Scotland and Lothians West electoral region. Uddingston and Bellshill continues to also cover parts of South Lanarkshire, being one of five alongside Clydesdale, East Kilbride, Hamilton, Larkhall and Stonehouse, and Rutherglen and Cambuslang.

Following the second review of Scottish Parliament boundaries, the following electoral wards were used to redefine the seat:

- North Lanarkshire:
  - Thorniewood (whole ward)
  - Bellshill (whole ward)
  - Mossend and Holytown (whole ward)
  - Motherwell North (in part)
- South Lanarkshire:
  - Bothwell and Uddingston (whole ward)
  - Hamilton North and East (in part)

== Member of the Scottish Parliament ==
Election	Member	Party
2011	Michael McMahon	Labour
2016	Richard Lyle	Scottish National Party
2021	Stephanie Callaghan	Scottish National Party
2026	Steven Bonnar	Scottish National Party

== Election results ==
=== 2020s ===
2026 Scottish Parliament election: Uddingston and Bellshill
Party	Candidate	Constituency			Regional		
Party	Candidate	Votes	%	±%	Votes	%	±%
SNP	Steven Bonnar	11,966	41.5	▼8.4	8,526	29.3	▼14.9
Labour	Mark Griffin (Note: Incumbent member on the party list, or for another constituency)	8,382	29.1	▼6.0	6,876	23.7	▼2.8
Reform	George Hobbins	5,646	19.0	New	5,904	20.3	▲20.1
Green					3,357	11.5	▲6.3
Conservative	Meghan Gallacher	1,750	6.1	▼6.6	1,849	6.4	▼11.0
Liberal Democrats	Ben Munnoch	1,094	3.8	▲1.5	988	3.4	▲1.8
Scottish Family					378	1.3	▲0.5
AtLS					362	1.2	New
Independent Green Voice					250	0.9	▲0.3
ISP					188	0.6	New
Scottish Socialist					157	0.5	New
Abolish the Scottish Parliament					83	0.3	Steady
Workers Party					68	0.2	New
Advance UK					44	0.2	New
UKIP					21	0.1	▼0.1
Scottish Libertarian					15	0.1	▼0.1
Majority		3,584	12.4	▼2.3			
Valid votes		28,838			29,066		
Invalid votes		129			88		
Turnout		28,967	48.9	▼12.1	29,154	49.2	▼11.8
SNP hold		Swing		▼1.2			
Notes

2021 Scottish Parliament election: Uddingston and Bellshill
Party	Candidate	Constituency			Regional		
Party	Candidate	Votes	%	±%	Votes	%	±%
SNP	Stephanie Callaghan	17,953	49.9	▲1.1	15,966	44.3	▼0.4
Labour	Frank McNally	12,647	35.1	▲2.6	9,559	26.5	▼1.3
Conservative	Bryan Flannagan	4,569	12.7	▼3.2	6,253	17.3	▲0.9
Green					1,879	5.2	▲1.2
Alba					629	1.7	New
Liberal Democrats	Dawn Allan	821	2.3	▼0.4	592	1.6	▼0.2
All for Unity					306	0.8	New
Scottish Family					289	0.8	New
Independent Green Voice					217	0.6	New
Abolish the Scottish Parliament					89	0.2	New
Scottish Libertarian					71	0.2	New
Freedom Alliance (UK)					71	0.2	New
Reform					61	0.2	New
UKIP					54	0.1	▼2.2
Independent	Paddy Hogg				34	0.1	New
Majority		5,306	14.8	▼1.5			
Valid votes		35,990			36,070		
Invalid votes		137			79		
Turnout		36,127	61.0	▲9.7	36,149	61.0	▲9.4
SNP hold		Swing		▼1.9			

=== 2010s ===
2016 Scottish Parliament election: Uddingston and Bellshill
Party	Candidate	Constituency			Regional		
Party	Candidate	Votes	%	±%	Votes	%	±%
SNP	Richard Lyle (Note: Incumbent member on the party list, or for another constituency)	14,424	48.8	▲5.5	13,263	44.7	▲2.8
Labour	Michael McMahon (Note: Incumbent member for this constituency)	9,615	32.5	▼13.6	8,253	27.8	▼11.2
Conservative	Andy Morrison	4,693	15.9	▲7.4	4,872	16.4	▲9.1
Green					1,189	4.0	▲2.1
UKIP					678	2.3	▲1.8
Liberal Democrats	Kaitey Blair	811	2.7	▲0.6	531	1.8	▲0.4
Solidarity					382	1.3	▲1.0
RISE					218	0.7	New
Scottish Christian					224	0.8	▼0.6
Independent	Deryck Beaumont				49	0.2	New
Majority		4,809	16.3	N/A			
Valid votes		29,543			29,659		
Invalid votes		173			40		
Turnout		29,716	51.3	▲6.2	29,699	51.5	▲6.4
SNP gain from Labour		Swing		▲9.6			
Notes

Scottish Parliament Election 2011: Uddingston and Bellshill
Party	Candidate	Constituency			Regional		
Party	Candidate	Votes	%	±%	Votes	%	±%
Labour	Michael McMahon (Note: Incumbent member for the Hamilton North and Bellshill constituency)	11,531	46.1	N/A	9,754	39.0	N/A
SNP	Richard Lyle (Note: Elected on the party list)	10,817	43.3	N/A	10,493	41.9	N/A
Conservative	Mark Brown	2,117	8.5	N/A	1,814	7.3	N/A
Scottish Senior Citizens					603	2.4	N/A
Green					482	1.9	N/A
Scottish Christian					352	1.4	N/A
Liberal Democrats	Fraser MacGregor	530	2.1	N/A	342	1.4	N/A
Socialist Labour					302	1.2	N/A
BNP					235	0.9	N/A
UKIP					121	0.5	N/A
Independent	Hugh O'Donnell				103	0.4	N/A
Scottish Socialist					95	0.4	N/A
Solidarity					81	0.3	N/A
Others					238	1.0	N/A
Majority		714	2.8	N/A			
Valid votes		24,995			25,015		
Invalid votes		101			81		
Turnout		25,096	45.1	N/A	25,096	45.1	N/A
Labour win (new seat)							

== Notes ==
=== Bibliography ===
- "Second Review of Scottish Parliament Boundaries: Report to Scottish Ministers" (PDF). Boundaries Scotland. April 2025.
