= Coatbridge and Chryston (Scottish Parliament constituency) =

Region or constituency of the Scottish Parliament

- Burgh constituency for the Scottish Parliament
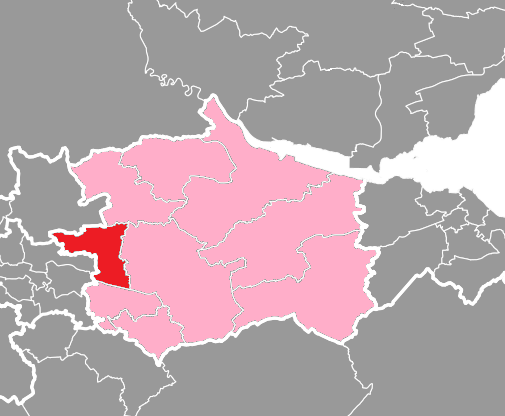

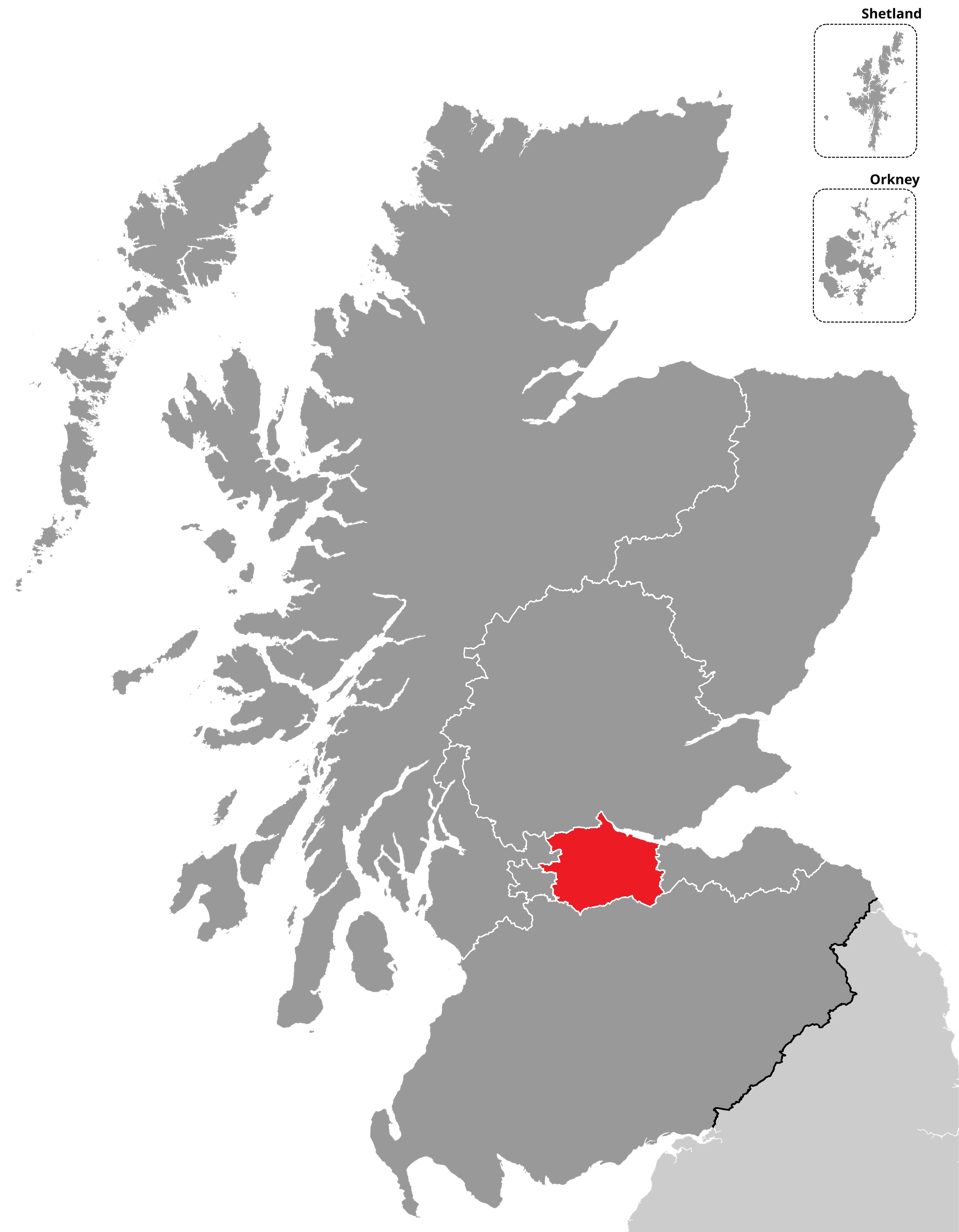
- Coatbridge and Chryston shown within the Central Scotland and Lothians West electoral region, and the region shown within Scotland
- Electoral region: Central Scotland and Lothians West
- Electorate: 59,023 (2026)

Current constituency
- Created: 1999
- Party: Scottish National Party
- MSP: Fulton MacGregor
- Council area: North Lanarkshire

Coatbridge and Chryston (Gaelic: Coatbridge agus Chryston) is a burgh constituency of the Scottish Parliament covering part of the council area of North Lanarkshire. It elects one Member of the Scottish Parliament (MSP) by the plurality (first past the post) method of election. Under the additional-member electoral system used for elections to the Scottish Parliament, it is also one of nine constituencies in the Central Scotland and Lothians West electoral region, which elects seven additional members, in addition to nine constituency MSPs, to produce a form of proportional representation for the region as a whole.

The seat has been held by Fulton MacGregor of the Scottish National Party since the 2016 Scottish Parliament election.

== Electoral region ==
The other eight constituencies of the Central Scotland and Lothians West region are Airdrie, Almond Valley, Bathgate, Cumbernauld and Kilsyth, Falkirk East and Linlithgow, Falkirk West, Motherwell and Wishaw, and Uddingston and Bellshill. The region covers all of the Falkirk, North Lanarkshire and West Lothian council areas, and part of the South Lanarkshire council area.

Prior to 2026, Coatbridge and Chryston formed part of the Central Scotland region. The other eight constituencies of this region were: Airdrie and Shotts, Cumbernauld and Kilsyth, East Kilbride, Falkirk East, Falkirk West, Hamilton, Larkhall and Stonehouse, Motherwell and Wishaw and Uddingston and Bellshill. The region covered all of the Falkirk council area, all of the North Lanarkshire council area and part of the South Lanarkshire council area.

== Constituency boundaries and council areas ==
Map of boundaries from 2005

The constituency was created at the same time as the Scottish Parliament, for the 1999 Scottish Parliament election, using the name and boundaries of the existing Coatbridge and Chryston constituency of the UK Parliament. Ahead of the 2005 United Kingdom general election the House of Commons constituencies in Scotland were altered, whilst the existing Scottish Parliament constituencies were retained, and there is now no longer any link between the two sets of boundaries. Coatbridge and Chryston has continued to be used as a constituency for the Scottish Parliament, although its boundaries have been revised at subsequent boundary reviews.

Following the first periodic review of Scottish Parliament boundaries the electoral wards used to define Coatbridge and Chryston were:

- In full: Coatbridge North, Coatbridge South, Coatbridge West, Gartcosh, Glenboig and Moodiesburn, Stepps, Chryston and Muirhead

When redrawn following the second periodic review of Scottish Parliament boundaries, the following electoral wards were used to redefine the seat:

- In full: Stepps, Chryston and Muirhead, Gartcosh, Glenboig and Moodiesburn, Coatbridge North, Coatbridge West, and Coatbridge South

Coatbridge and Chryston is one of four Scottish Parliament constituencies covering the North Lanarkshire council area, the others being Airdrie, Cumbernauld and Kilsyth, and Motherwell and Wishaw; Uddingston and Bellshill spans parts of both North and South Lanarkshire. All five are within the Central Scotland and Lothians West electoral region.

== Member of the Scottish Parliament ==
Election	Member	Party
1999	Elaine Smith	Labour
2016	Fulton MacGregor	SNP

== Election results ==
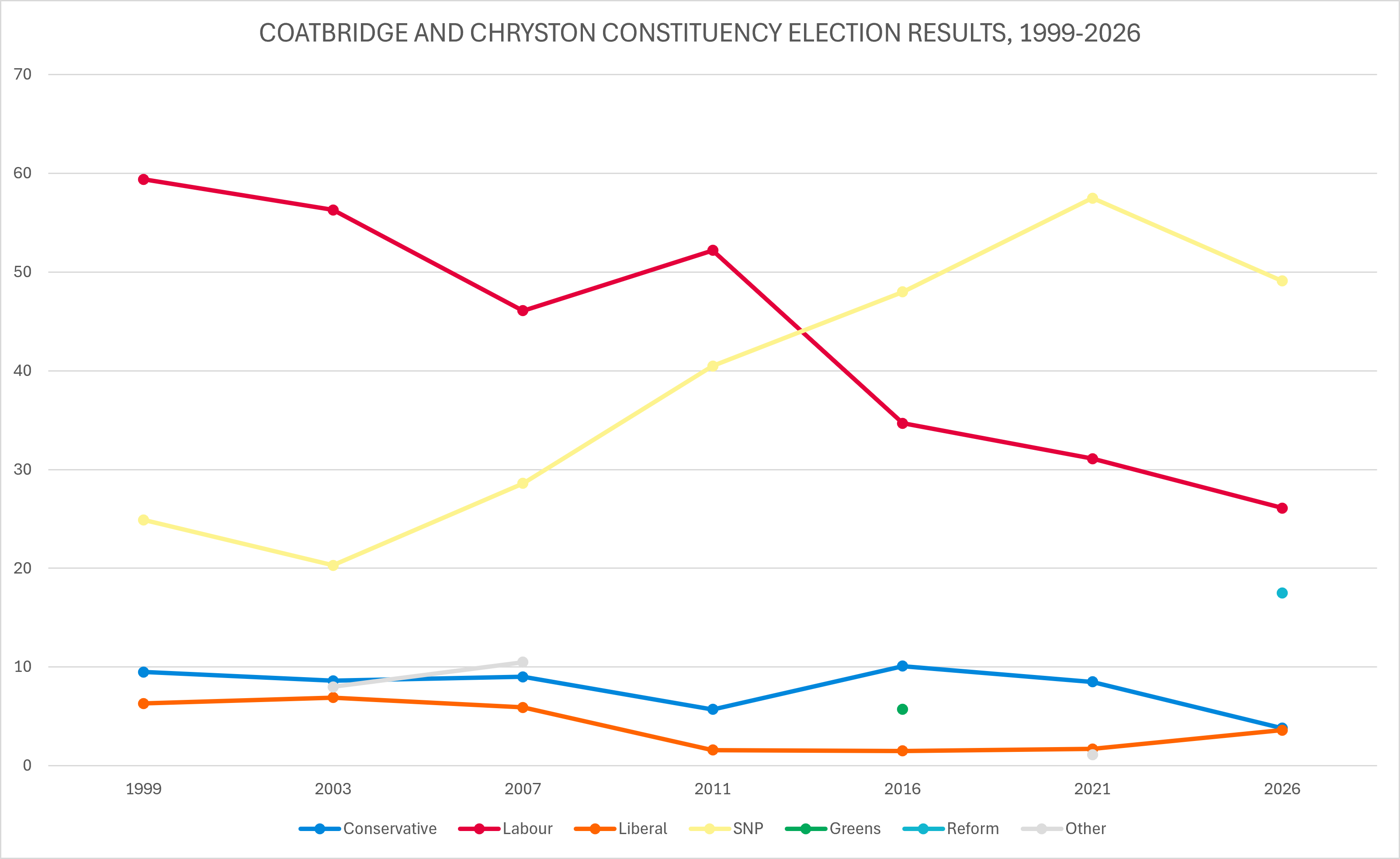
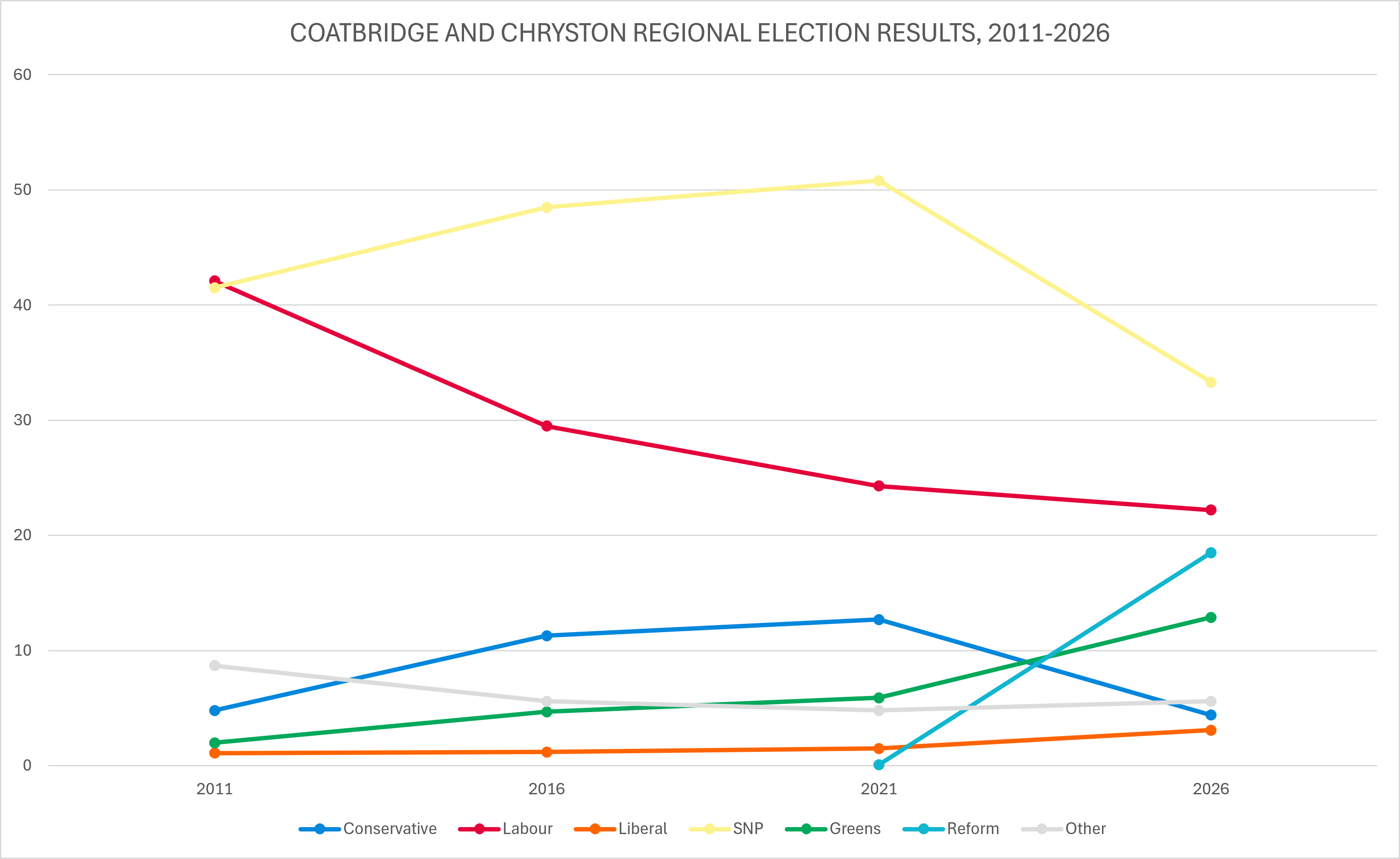

=== 2026 ===
2026 Scottish Parliament election: Coatbridge and Chryston
Party	Candidate	Constituency			Regional		
Party	Candidate	Votes	%	±%	Votes	%	±%
SNP	Fulton MacGregor (Note: Incumbent member for this constituency)	14,458	49.1	▼8.4	9,817	33.3	▼17.5
Labour	Kieron Higgins	7,682	26.1	▼5.0	6,546	22.2	▼2.1
Reform	Mandy Lindsay	5,145	17.5	New	5,452	18.5	▲18.4
Green					3,811	12.9	▲7.0
Conservative	Andy Bruce	1,109	3.8	▼4.7	1,295	4.4	▼8.3
Liberal Democrats	Daniel Mancini	1,048	3.6	▲1.9	913	3.1	▲1.6
AtLS					448	1.5	New
Scottish Family					289	1.0	▲0.3
ISP					280	0.9	New
Independent Green Voice					254	0.9	▲0.2
Scottish Socialist					166	0.6	New
Workers Party					74	0.3	New
Abolish the Scottish Parliament					52	0.2	Steady
Advance UK					37	0.1	New
Scottish Libertarian					30	0.1	New
UKIP					11	0.0	▼0.1
Majority		6,776	23.0	▼3.4			
Valid votes		29,442			29,475		
Invalid votes		153			125		
Turnout		29,595	50.1	▼13.1	29,600	50.1	▼13.1
SNP hold		Swing		▼1.7			

=== 2020s ===
2021 Scottish Parliament election: Coatbridge and Chryston
Party	Candidate	Constituency			Regional		
Party	Candidate	Votes	%	±%	Votes	%	±%
SNP	Fulton MacGregor (Note: Incumbent member for this constituency)	20,577	57.5	▲9.5	18,191	50.8	▲2.3
Labour	Michael McPake	11,140	31.1	▼3.6	8,724	24.3	▼5.2
Conservative	Gordon Macdonald	3,028	8.5	▼1.6	4,546	12.7	▲1.4
Green					2,125	5.9	▲1.2
Alba					684	1.9	New
Liberal Democrats	Mhairi Macdonald	622	1.7	▲0.2	534	1.5	▲0.3
All for Unity					248	0.7	New
Scottish Family	Leo Lanahan	411	1.1	New	240	0.7	New
Independent Green Voice					220	0.7	New
Abolish the Scottish Parliament					76	0.2	New
Scottish Libertarian					62	0.2	New
Freedom Alliance (UK)					54	0.2	New
Reform					47	0.1	New
Independent	Paddy Hogg				43	0.1	New
UKIP					35	0.1	▼2.7
Majority		9,437	26.4	▲13.1			
Valid votes		35,778			35,829		
Invalid votes		113			75		
Turnout		35,891	63.2	▲9.8	35,904	63.2	▲9.8
SNP hold		Swing					

=== 2010s ===
2016 Scottish Parliament election: Coatbridge and Chryston
Party	Candidate	Constituency			Regional		
Party	Candidate	Votes	%	±%	Votes	%	±%
SNP	Fulton MacGregor	13,605	48.0	▲7.5	13,775	48.5	▲7.0
Labour	Elaine Smith	9,826	34.7	▼17.5	8,369	29.5	▼12.6
Conservative	Robyn Halbert	2,868	10.1	▲4.4	3,201	11.3	▲6.5
Green	John Wilson	1,612	5.7	New	1,347	4.7	▲2.7
UKIP					503	2.7	▲1.4
Solidarity					394	1.4	▲1.0
Liberal Democrats	Jenni Lang	423	1.5	▼0.1	353	1.2	▲0.1
RISE					184	0.6	New
Scottish Christian					219	0.8	▼0.8
Independent	Deryck Beaumont				34	0.1	New
Majority		3,779	13.3	N/A			
Valid votes		28,334			28,379		
Invalid votes		73			34		
Turnout		28,407	53.4	▲7.6	28,413	53.4	▲7.7
SNP gain from Labour		Swing		▲12.6			

2011 Scottish Parliament election: Coatbridge and Chryston
Party	Candidate	Constituency			Regional		
Party	Candidate	Votes	%	±%	Votes	%	±%
Labour	Elaine Smith	12,161	52.2	N/A	9,805	42.1	N/A
SNP	John Wilson	9,420	40.5	N/A	9,675	41.5	N/A
Conservative	Jason Lingiah	1,317	5.7	N/A	1,123	4.8	N/A
All-Scotland Pensioners Party					525	2.3	N/A
Green					463	2.0	N/A
Scottish Christian					364	1.6	N/A
Socialist Labour					342	1.5	N/A
Liberal Democrats	Rod Ackland	381	1.6	N/A	247	1.1	N/A
BNP					219	0.9	N/A
Scottish Socialist					119	0.5	N/A
Solidarity					90	0.4	N/A
Independent	Hugh O'Donnell				85	0.4	N/A
UKIP					72	0.3	N/A
Others					183	0.8	N/A
Majority		2,741	11.7	N/A			
Valid votes		23,279			23,312		
Invalid votes		105			76		
Turnout		23,279	45.7	N/A	23,388	45.7	N/A
Labour win (new boundaries)							

=== 2000s ===
2007 Scottish Parliament election: Coatbridge and Chryston
Party	Candidate	Votes	%	±%
Labour	Elaine Smith	11,860	46.1	−10.1
SNP	Frances McGlinchey	7,350	28.6	+8.3
Conservative	Ross Thomson	2,305	9.0	+0.5
Independent	Julie McAnulty	1,843	7.2	New
Liberal Democrats	Doreen Nisbet	1,519	5.9	−1.0
Scottish Voice	Gaille McCann	848	3.3	New
Majority		4,510	17.5	−18.4
Turnout		25,725	47.3	+1.0
Labour hold		Swing	-9.2	

2003 Scottish Parliament election: Coatbridge and Chryston
Party	Candidate	Votes	%	±%
Labour	Elaine Smith	13,422	56.25	−3.10
SNP	James Gribben	4,851	20.33	−4.57
Conservative	Donald Reece	2,041	8.55	−0.94
Scottish Socialist	Gordon Martin	1,911	8.01	New
Liberal Democrats	Doreen Nisbit	1,637	6.86	+0.60
Majority		8,571	35.92	+1.47
Turnout		23,862	46.32	−11.56
Labour hold		Swing		

=== 1990s ===
1999 Scottish Parliament election: Coatbridge and Chryston
Party	Candidate	Votes	%	±%
Labour	Elaine Smith	17,923	59.35	N/A
SNP	Peter Kearney	7,519	24.90	N/A
Conservative	Gordon Lind	2,867	9.49	N/A
Liberal Democrats	Jane Hook	1,889	6.26	N/A
Majority		10,404	34.45	N/A
Turnout		30,198	57.88	N/A
Labour win (new seat)				

== See also ==
- Coatbridge and Chryston (UK Parliament constituency)
