= East Kilbride (Scottish Parliament constituency) =

Region or constituency of the Scottish Parliament

- Burgh constituency for the Scottish Parliament
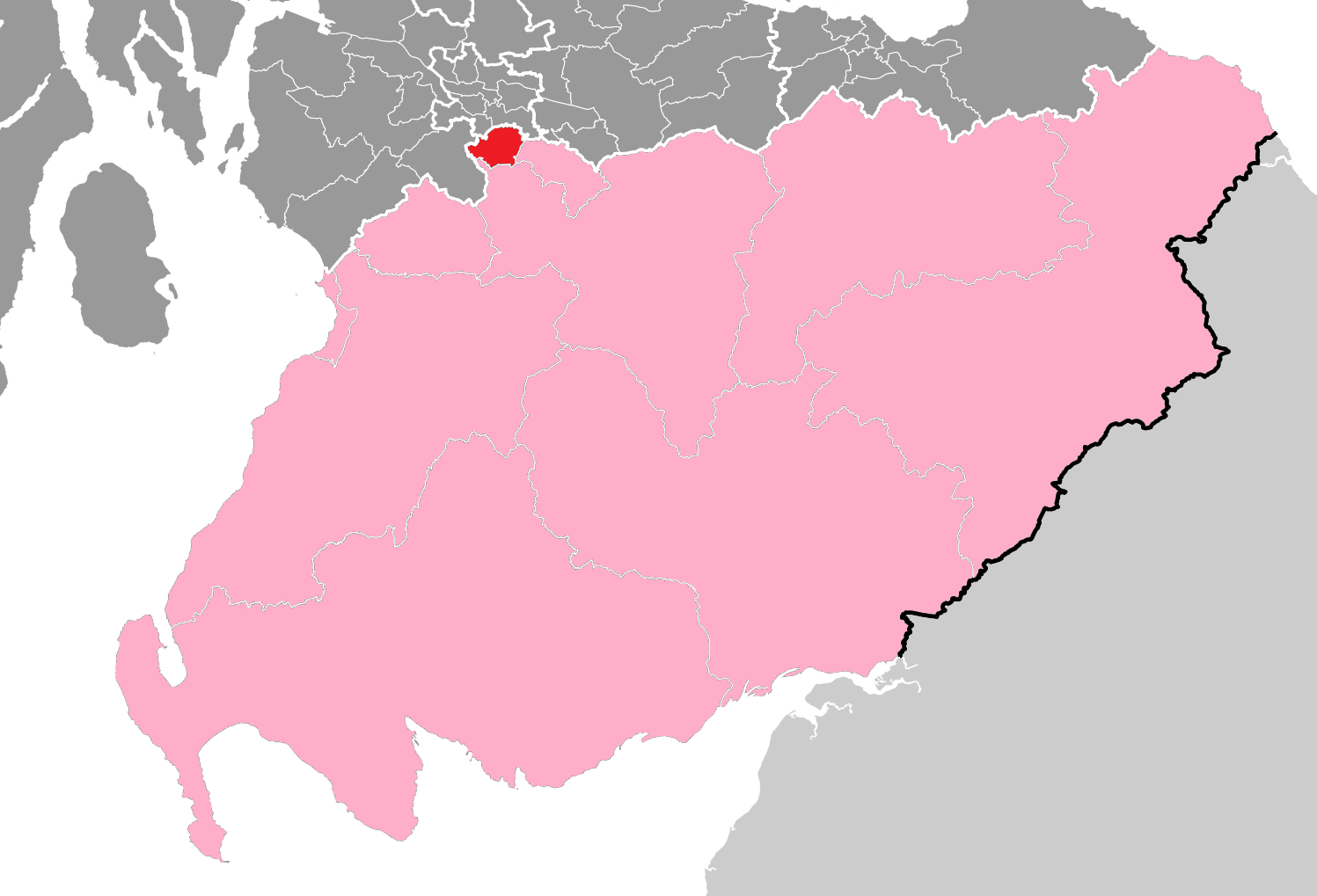

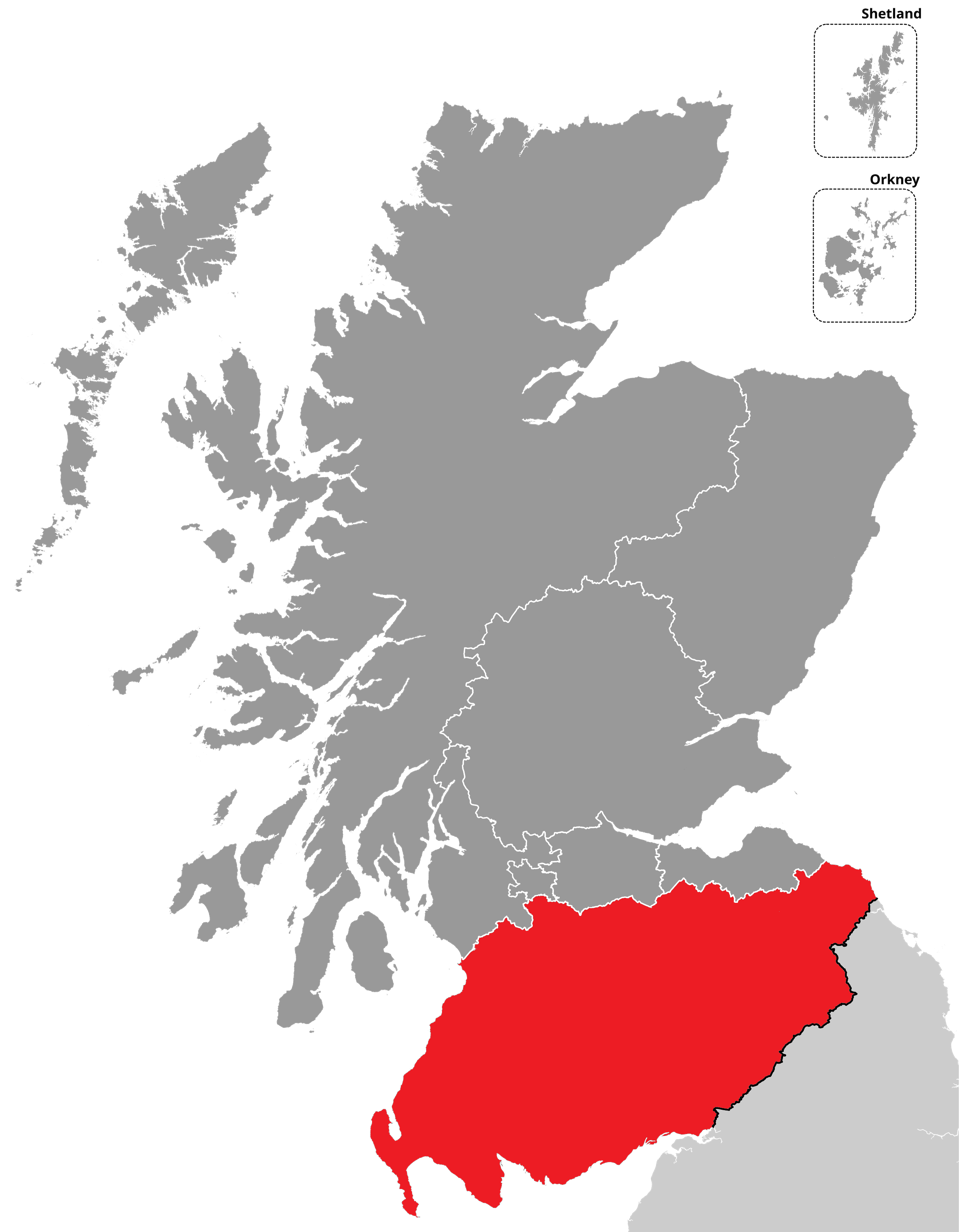
- East Kilbride shown within the South Scotland electoral region, and the region shown within Scotland
- Electoral region: South Scotland
- Electorate: 61,028 (2026)

Current constituency
- Created: 1999
- Party: Scottish National Party
- MSP: Collette Stevenson
- Council area: South Lanarkshire

East Kilbride (Gaelic: Cille Bhrìghde an Ear) is a burgh constituency of the Scottish Parliament covering part of the council area of South Lanarkshire. Under the additional-member electoral system used for elections to the Scottish Parliament, it elects one Member of the Scottish Parliament (MSP) by the first past the post method of election. It is also one of ten constituencies in the South Scotland electoral region, which elects seven additional members, in addition to the ten constituency MSPs, to produce a form of proportional representation for the region as a whole.

The seat has been held by Collette Stevenson of the Scottish National Party since the 2021 Scottish Parliament election.

== Electoral region ==
Following the second periodic review of Scottish Parliament boundaries in 2025, East Kilbride was moved from the Central Scotland electoral region into the South Scotland Region. The other nine constituencies of this region are: Ayr; Carrick, Cumnock and Doon Valley; Clydesdale; Dumfriesshire; Ettrick, Roxburgh and Berwickshire; Galloway and West Dumfries; Hamilton, Larkhall and Stonehouse; Kilmarnock and Irvine Valley; and Midlothian South, Tweeddale and Lauderdale. The region covers the whole of the council areas of Dumfries and Galloway, Scottish Borders, and South Ayrshire; and parts of the council areas of East Ayrshire, Midlothian, and South Lanarkshire. By population it is now the largest of Scotland's eight electoral regions.

Prior to the 2025 review, East Kilbride formed part of the Central Scotland region; the review saw this replaced by a region entitled Central Scotland and Lothians West. The other eight constituencies of this region were: Airdrie and Shotts, Coatbridge and Chryston, Cumbernauld and Kilsyth, Falkirk East, Falkirk West, Hamilton, Larkhall and Stonehouse, Motherwell and Wishaw and Uddingston and Bellshill. The region covered all of the Falkirk council area, all of the North Lanarkshire council area and part of the South Lanarkshire council area.

== Constituency boundaries and council area ==
Map of boundaries from 2005

East Kilbride constituency is one of five covering the South Lanarkshire council area. Of the five, Clydesdale and Hamilton, Larkhall and Stonehouse are also now within the South Scotland region. Rutherglen is within the Glasgow region; Uddingston and Bellshill is part of the Central Scotland and Lothians West region.

The constituency was created at the same time as the Scottish Parliament, in 1999, with the name and boundaries of an existing UK House of Commons constituency. In 2005, however, Scottish House of Commons constituencies were mostly replaced with new constituencies. The seat remained unchanged following the Second Periodic Review of Scottish Parliament Boundaries undertaken by Boundaries Scotland ahead of the 2026 Scottish Parliament election.

Covering the entirety of the large town of East Kilbride, the electoral wards of South Lanarkshire Council used in the current creation of East Kilbride are:

- East Kilbride Central North (entire ward)
- East Kilbride Central South (shared with Clydesdale)
- East Kilbride East (entire ward)
- East Kilbride South (entire ward)
- East Kilbride West (entire ward)

=== Constituency profile ===
BBC profile for 2016 election:

This constituency is based around Scotland's oldest new town - East Kilbride. Its post-war housing, built on former farm land, has attracted families who work in office-based centres and who commute into nearby Glasgow, 8 miles to the north west.

The area's Hairmyres Hospital was opened 10 years ago and was built with private finance initiative money. The constituency's good road and public transport links has attracted some big employers. These include HM Revenue and Customs, which has several large office in East Kilbride, although these are facing closure as the agency restructures its operations. The dairy company Robert Wiseman is also based in East Kilbride, and the town centre is occupied by a large shopping centre comprising six interlinked malls.

Labour's Andy Kerr represented the seat from the founding of the Scottish Parliament in 1999 until Linda Fabiani took it for the SNP in 2011.

== Member of the Scottish Parliament ==
Election	Member	Party
1999	Andy Kerr	Labour
2011	Linda Fabiani	SNP
2021	Collette Stevenson	SNP

== Election results ==
=== 2020s ===
2026 Scottish Parliament election: East Kilbride
Party	Candidate	Constituency			Regional		
Party	Candidate	Votes	%	±%	Votes	%	±%
SNP	Collette Stevenson (Note: Incumbent member for this constituency)	14,339	42.4	▼9.5	10,357	30.6	▼14.2
Labour	Joe Fagan (Note: Elected on the party list)	9,395	27.8	▼2.8	7,433	27.7	▼8.7
Reform	Timothy Kelly (Note: Timothy Kelly left Reform UK in advance of the election.)	5,683	16.8	New	6,324	18.7	New
Green					4,297	12.7	▲5.6
Conservative	Brian Whittle (Note: Incumbent member on the party list, or for another constituency)	2,251	6.7	▼7.8	2,461	7.3	▼10.1
Liberal Democrats	Leigh Butler	1,424	4.2	▲1.2	1,315	3.9	▲1.6
Independent	Kristofer Keane	716	2.1	New			
Independent Green Voice					416	1.2	▲0.7
AtLS					392	1.2	New
Scottish Family					370	1.1	▲0.4
Scottish Socialist					133	0.4	New
Scottish Common Party					117	0.3	New
Independent	Sean Davies				57	0.2	New
Independent	Denise Sommerville				54	0.2	New
Heritage					51	0.2	New
UKIP					44	0.1	Steady
ADF					40	0.1	New
Scottish Libertarian					28	0.1	▼0.1
Majority		4,944	14.6	▼6.7			
Valid votes		33,808			33,889		
Invalid votes		135			87		
Turnout		33,943	55.6	▼11.0	33,976	55.7	▼10.9
SNP hold		Swing		▼6.2			
Notes

2021 Scottish Parliament election: East Kilbride
Party	Candidate	Constituency			Regional		
Party	Candidate	Votes	%	±%	Votes	%	±%
SNP	Collette Stevenson	21,149	51.9	▼4.0	18,331	44.8	▼4.0
Labour	Monique McAdams	12,477	30.6	▲6.4	9,625	23.5	▲1.1
Conservative	Graham Simpson (Note: Incumbent member on the party list, or for another constituency)	5,923	14.5	▼2.4	7,127	17.4	▲0.8
Liberal Democrats	Paul McGarry	1,217	3.0	▲0.1	932	2.3	▲0.3
Green					2,903	7.1	▲1.0
Alba					619	1.5	New
All for Unity					391	1.0	New
Scottish Family					278	0.7	New
Independent Green Voice					217	0.5	New
Reform					131	0.3	New
Abolish the Scottish Parliament					90	0.2	New
Freedom Alliance (UK)					86	0.2	New
Scottish Libertarian					74	0.2	New
UKIP					56	0.1	▼1.7
Independent	Paddy Hogg				40	0.1	New
Majority		8,672	21.3	▼10.4			
Valid votes		40,766			40,900		
Invalid votes		157			47		
Turnout		40,923	66.6	▲9.7	40,947	66.6	▲9.7
SNP hold		Swing		▼5.2			

=== 2010s ===
2016 Scottish Parliament election: East Kilbride
Party	Candidate	Constituency			Regional		
Party	Candidate	Votes	%	±%	Votes	%	±%
SNP	Linda Fabiani (Note: Incumbent member for this constituency)	19,371	55.9	▲7.9	16,929	48.8	▲2.4
Labour	LizAnne Handibode	8,392	24.2	▼17.3	7,758	22.4	▼11.0
Conservative	Graham Simpson	5,857	16.9	▲9.3	5,755	16.6	▲10.2
Green					2,127	6.1	▲1.9
Liberal Democrats	Paul McGarry	1,009	2.9	▲1.3	681	2.0	▲0.6
UKIP					640	1.8	▲1.3
Solidarity					399	1.1	▲0.8
Scottish Christian					254	0.7	▼0.4
RISE					113	0.3	New
Independent	Deryck Beaumont				53	0.2	New
Majority		10,979	31.7	▲25.2			
Valid votes		34,629			34,709		
Invalid votes		139			58		
Turnout		34,768	56.9	▲5.4	34,767	56.9	▲5.4
SNP hold		Swing		▲12.6			
Notes

2011 Scottish Parliament election: East Kilbride
Party	Candidate	Constituency			Regional		
Party	Candidate	Votes	%	±%	Votes	%	±%
SNP	Linda Fabiani (Note: Incumbent member on the party list, or for another constituency)	14,359	48.0	N/A	13,906	46.4	N/A
Labour	Andy Kerr (Note: Incumbent member for this constituency)	12,410	41.5	N/A	10,006	33.4	N/A
Conservative	Graham Simpson	2,260	7.6	N/A	1,911	6.4	N/A
Liberal Democrats	Douglas Herbison	468	1.6	N/A	422	1.4	N/A
Independent	John Houston	414	1.4	N/A	N/A	N/A	N/A
Green					1,259	4.2	N/A
All-Scotland Pensioners Party					855	2.9	N/A
BNP					256	0.8	N/A
Scottish Christian					320	1.1	N/A
Scottish Homeland Party					36	0.1	N/A
Scottish Socialist					98	0.3	N/A
Scottish Unionist					193	0.6	N/A
Socialist Labour					348	1.2	N/A
Solidarity					94	0.3	N/A
UKIP					142	0.5	N/A
Independent	Hugh O'Donnell				70	0.2	N/A
Majority		1,949	6.5	N/A			
Valid votes		29,911			29,916		
Invalid votes		103			83		
Turnout		30,014	51.5	N/A	29,999	51.5	N/A
SNP win (new boundaries)							

=== 2000s ===
2007 Scottish Parliament election: East Kilbride
Party	Candidate	Votes	%	±%
Labour	Andy Kerr	15,334	42.7	+2.1
SNP	Linda Fabiani	13,362	37.2	+12.1
Conservative	Graham Simpson	4,115	11.5	+0.4
Liberal Democrats	Dave Clark	3,092	8.6	+2.2
Majority		1,972	5.5	−10.0
Turnout		35,903	53.6	+1.5
Labour hold		Swing		

2003 Scottish Parliament election: East Kilbride
Party	Candidate	Votes	%	±%
Labour	Andy Kerr	13,825	40.56	−7.82
SNP	Linda Fabiani	8,544	25.07	−7.42
Conservative	Grace Campbell	3,785	11.10	+0.29
Scottish Socialist	Carolyn Leckie	2,736	8.03	New
Liberal Democrats	Alex McKie	2,181	6.40	−1.74
Majority		5,281	15.49	−0.24
Turnout		34,087	52.06	−10.73
Labour hold		Swing		

=== 1990s ===
1999 Scottish Parliament election: East Kilbride
Party	Candidate	Votes	%	±%
Labour	Andy Kerr	19,987	48.38	N/A
SNP	Linda Fabiani	13,488	32.65	N/A
Conservative	Craig Stevenson	4,465	10.81	N/A
Liberal Democrats	Ewan Hawthorn	3,373	8.16	N/A
Majority		6,499	15.73	N/A
Turnout		41,313	62.79	N/A
Labour win (new seat)				

== See also ==
- East Kilbride (UK Parliament constituency)
