= Minister for Equalities and International Development =

Junior ministerial post in the Scottish Government

Minister for Equalities & International Development
- Scottish Gaelic: Ministear airson Co-ionannachd

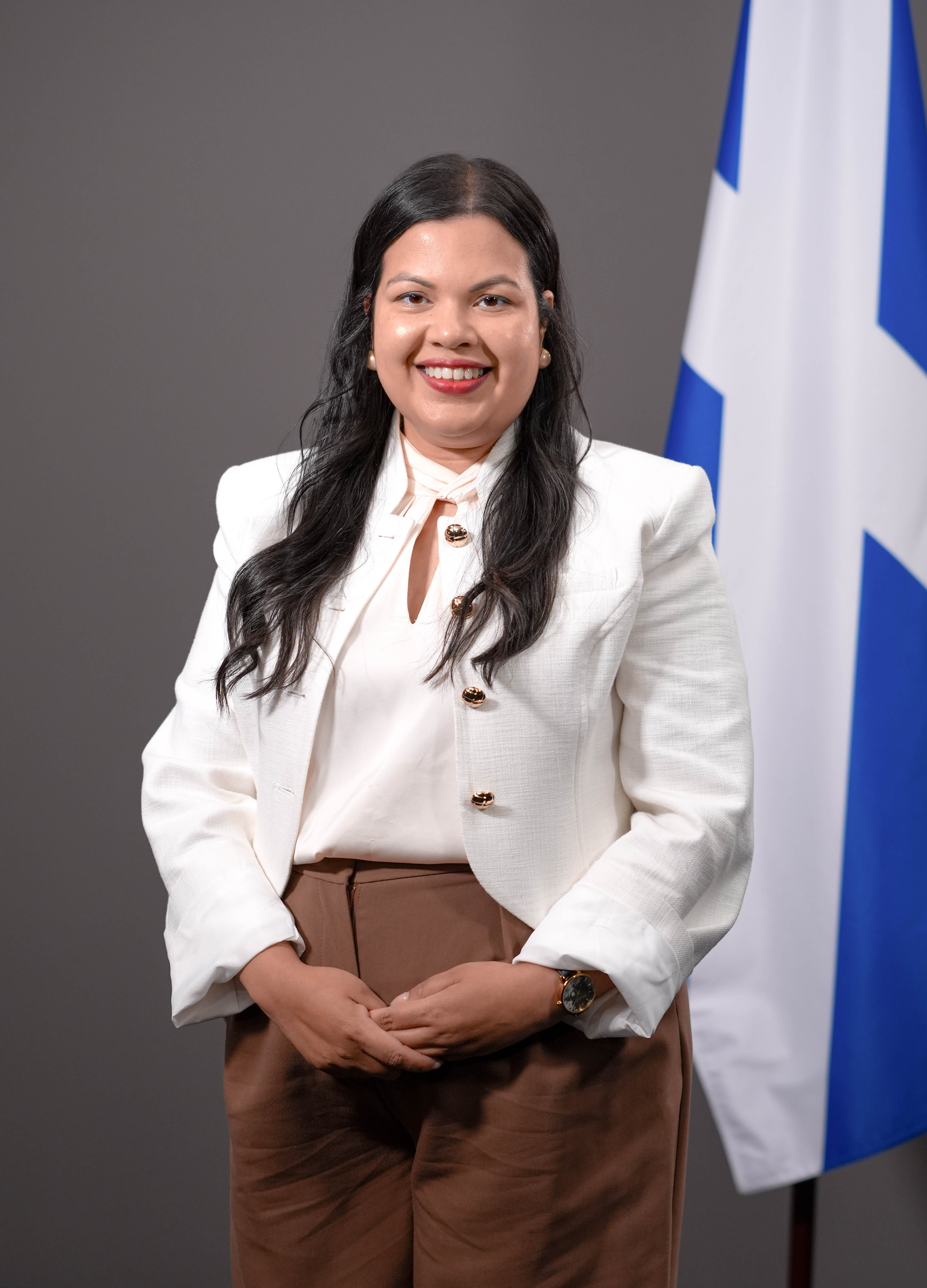
- Incumbent; Simita Kumar since 21 May 2026
- Style: Minister (within parliament); Equalities Minister (informal); Scottish Equalities Minister (outwith Scotland)
- Member of: Scottish Parliament; Scottish Government
- Reports to: Scottish Parliament
- Seat: Edinburgh
- Appointer: First Minister
- Inaugural holder: Jeane Freeman Minister for Social Security
- Formation: 19 May 2016
- Salary: £106,185 per annum (2024) (including £72,196 MSP salary)
- Website: www.gov.scot

The Minister for Equalities & International Development is a Junior ministerial post in the Scottish Government. As a result, the Minister does not attend the Scottish Cabinet. The post was created in June 2018 under the title 'Minister for Older People and Equalities: the Minister supports the Cabinet Secretary for Social Justice, who is a full member of cabinet.

The incumbent Minister is Simita Kumar since 21 May 2026.

== Overview ==
The Minister for Older People and Equalities had specific responsibility for promoting and coordinating policy in support of:

- Social equality with respect to gender, sexuality, race, and disability
- The protection and development of social and human rights
- Equality for and the needs of Older people

The current post holds the following responsibilities:

- mainstreaming of equality and human rights
- diversity, inclusion and equalities, including disability, older people, women, gender, LGBTI and race, including Gypsy/Traveller community
- social isolation and loneliness strategy
- faith and belief
- population and migration
- New Scots strategy
- refugees and asylum seekers
- displaced peoples

== List of office holders ==
Name	Portrait	Entered office	Left office	Party	First Minister
Minister for Social Security
Jeane Freeman		19 May 2016	28 June 2018	Scottish National Party	Nicola Sturgeon
Minister for Older People and Equalities
Christina McKelvie		28 June 2018	29 March 2023	Scottish National Party	Nicola Sturgeon
Minister for Social Security and Local Government
Ben Macpherson		20 May 2021	29 March 2023	Scottish National Party	Nicola Sturgeon
Minister for Equalities, Migration and Refugees
Emma Roddick		29 March 2023	8 May 2024	Scottish National Party	Humza Yousaf
Minister for Equalities
Kaukab Stewart		8 May 2024	20 May 2026	Scottish National Party	John Swinney
Minister for Equalities & International Development
Simita Kumar		21 May 2026	Incumbent	Scottish National Party	John Swinney

== See also ==
- Scottish Parliament
