= Kaukab Stewart =

Scottish National Party politician

- Stewart in 2024

Minister for Equalities
- In office 8 May 2024 – 20 May 2026
- First Minister: John Swinney
- Preceded by: Emma Roddick
- Succeeded by: Simita Kumar

Minister for Culture, Europe and International Development
- In office 20 February 2024 – 8 May 2024
- First Minister: Humza Yousaf
- Preceded by: Christina McKelvie
- Succeeded by: Stephen Gethins (Europe, External Affairs, and Energy)

Member of the Scottish Parliament for Glasgow Kelvin
- In office 6 May 2021 – 9 April 2026
- Preceded by: Sandra White
- Succeeded by: Constituency abolished

Personal details
- Born: 7 December 1967 (aged 56) Pakistan
- Party: Scottish National Party
- Spouse: Richard Stewart
- Children: 2
- Profession: Educator
- Website: kaukabstewart.scot

Kaukab Stewart (born 7 December 1967) is a Pakistani-born Scottish politician. A member of the Scottish National Party (SNP), she was the Member of the Scottish Parliament (MSP) for Glasgow Kelvin from 2021 to 2026.

At the 2021 Scottish Parliament election, she became one of the first women of colour elected to the Scottish Parliament, alongside Pam Gosal. From May 2024, she served as Minister for Equalities.

In 2026, after her seat was abolished following boundary changes, Stewart was selected as the SNP candidate for Glasgow Southside, where she lost to Scottish Greens candidate Holly Bruce.

== Early life and career ==
Stewart was born to Pakistani parents in Pakistan and moved with her family to Northampton, England when she was two years old, where she attended Northampton School for Girls. She then moved to Glasgow, Scotland, aged sixteen after her engineer father got a job at the Plessey factory. Stewart then attended Bellahouston Academy in Glasgow and Moray House School of Education in Edinburgh.

Prior to her election, she worked as a primary school teacher for nearly 30 years, alongside pursuing a political career, which she earlier admitted as challenging even with a "sympathetic headteacher....you have a duty to the kids, who must come first."

She married Richard Stewart on 14 September 1989. They have two children.

== Political career ==
Stewart joined the Scottish National Party in 1994. "For me it is all about the fact that I was always a supporter of equal rights and self-determination," she explained. "I always wanted control over my own affairs and it was a natural progression to put that into a Scotland context. To be able to do what you want to do, when you want to do it and how you want to do it is very important to me."

She stood unsuccessfully as a SNP candidate in the first Scottish Parliament election since devolution, against Donald Dewar for Glasgow Anniesland at the 1999 Scottish Parliament election. Eleven years later, she stood unsuccessfully against former Chancellor of the Exchequer Alistair Darling at the 2010 general election. Speaking about these experiences in September 2020, Stewart said: "In these elections I knew my chances of being elected were close to zero but it was that dream of a better nation which inspired me to carry on... It's thanks to the hard work of the activists I worked with then that we are where we are today."

On 6 November 2020, Stewart was selected as the SNP candidate in Glasgow Kelvin for the 2021 Scottish Parliament election. At the election, she was elected as Kelvin's Member of the Scottish Parliament (MSP) with a majority of 5,458 votes. Her election was noted in the UK press and abroad, such as The Japan Times and Le Parisien.

Stewart was appointed in June 2021 as deputy convenor of the Holyrood education committee which scrutinises Scottish education policy and its lead bodies. In the same year she was interviewed for Channel 4's The Political Slot on her party's vision for equality in Scotland.

In January 2023, she was one of a number of Scottish politicians who drew media attention and criticism after being photographed smiling in front of a sign reading 'Decapitate TERFs' and a drawing of a guillotine at a Glasgow rally. She subsequently claimed that she had not seen the sign in question and commented that "Violent hate speech is totally unacceptable and has absolutely no place in our public discourse." This explanation met with some ridicule, including from the author J.K. Rowling, who commented, "I too beam with delight when having my photograph taken with things of which I am entirely unaware". The sign was reported to Police Scotland. Fellow MSP Murdo Fraser described the sign as "clearly a hate crime and a public order offence".

Stewart was appointed Minister for Culture, Europe and International Development in the first Yousaf government following a reshuffle in February 2024. She was later appointed Minister for Equalities in the Swinney government.

Due to the abolition of her seat after the second periodic review of Scottish Parliament boundaries in 2025, she contested Nicola Sturgeon's former constituency of Glasgow Southside at the 2026 Scottish Parliament election. Holly Bruce of the Scottish Greens won the seat with a massive swing.

== See also ==
- List of British Pakistanis
- List of ethnic minority politicians in the United Kingdom

Scottish Parliament
| Preceded by Sandra White | Member of the Scottish Parliament for Glasgow Kelvin; 2021–2026 | Constituency abolished |
