= St Leonard's Secondary School =

St. Leonard's Secondary

Location
- 62 Lochend Road, Easterhouse; Glasgow; Scotland; 55.869500°N 4.110330°W

Information
- Type: Comprehensive, Mixed-sex education, secondary
- Religious affiliation: Catholic
- Established: 1966
- Closed: 1998
- Head teacher: Paul McBride (last acting head teacher)

St. Leonard's Secondary School (The Lenny) was a Catholic, mixed-sex, comprehensive secondary school located in Easterhouse, Glasgow.

It was permanently closed in 1998 to pupils, and soon after was demolished. On the same ground now stands St. Benedict's Roman Catholic Primary School.

The majority of pupils were relocated to St Andrew's Secondary.
