= 2026 Scottish Parliament election =

General election held in Scotland on 7 May 2026

- 7 May 2026

All 129 seats to the Scottish Parliament 65 seats needed for a majority
- Opinion polls
- Registered: 4,320,981
- Turnout: Constituency – 53.4% ▼10.1pp Regional – 53.4% ▼10.1pp
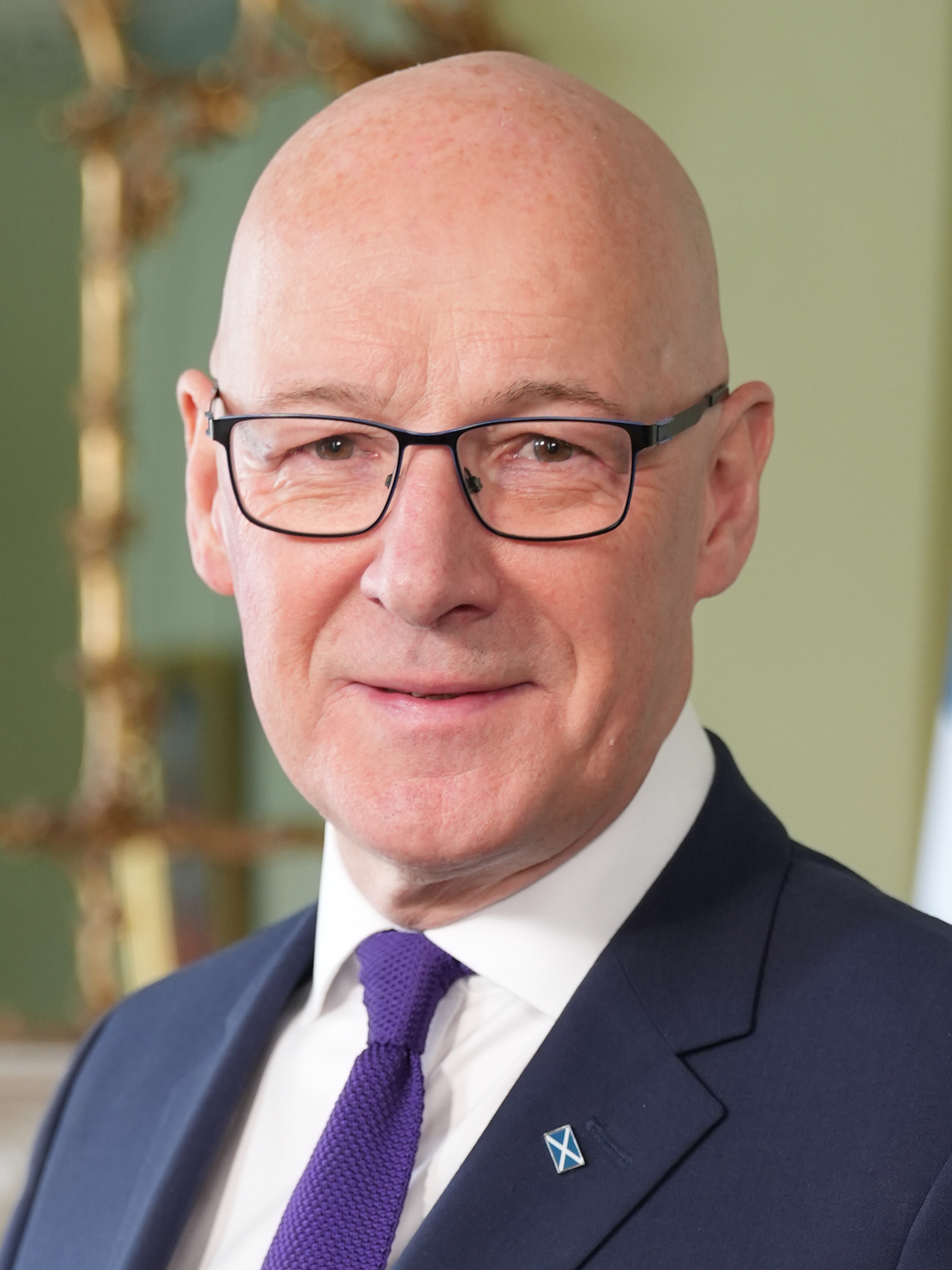

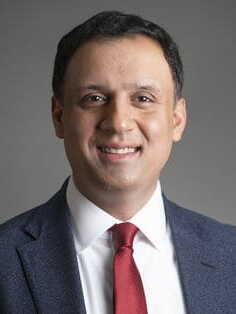

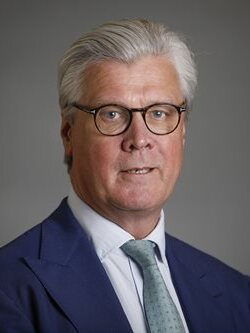

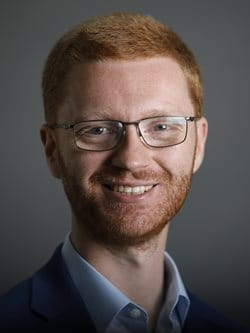

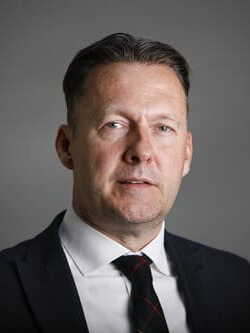

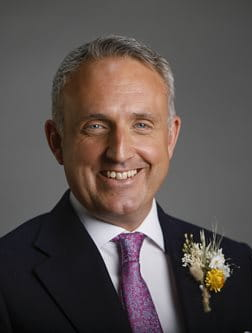
	First party	Second party	Third party
Leader	John Swinney	Anas Sarwar	Malcolm Offord
Party	SNP	Labour	Reform
Leader since	6 May 2024	27 February 2021	15 January 2026
Leader's seat	Perthshire North	Glasgow	West Scotland (Note: Not an incumbent but stood for this region and won)
Last election	64 seats	22 (Note: Includes 11 MSPs sponsored by the Co-operative Party, who are designated Labour and Co-operative.) seats	0 seats
Seats before	60	20 (Note: Includes 10 MSPs sponsored by the Co-operative Party, who are designated Labour and Co-operative.)	1
Seats won	58	17 (Note: Includes 7 MSPs sponsored by the Co-operative Party, who are designated Labour and Co-operative.)	17
Seat change	▼6	▼5	▲17
Constituency vote	877,077	440,708	361,994
% and swing	38.2% ▼9.5pp	19.2% ▼2.4pp	15.8% (New)
Regional vote	625,949	368,785	383,425
% and swing	27.2% ▼13.1pp	16.0% ▼1.9pp	16.6% ▲16.4pp
	Fourth party	Fifth party	Sixth party
Leader	Ross Greer / Gillian Mackay	Russell Findlay	Alex Cole-Hamilton
Party	Green	Conservative	Liberal Democrats
Leader since	29 August 2025	27 September 2024	20 August 2021
Leader's seat	West Scotland / Central Scotland and Lothians West (Note: Represented Central Scotland region prior to dissolution. Central Scotland and Lothians West was the direct successor region under new boundaries.)	West Scotland	Edinburgh North Western (Note: Represented the Edinburgh Western constituency prior to dissolution. Edinburgh North Western was the main successor constituency under new boundaries.)
Last election	8 seats	31 seats	4 seats
Seats before	7	28	5
Seats won	15	12	10
Seat change	▲7	▼19	▲6
Constituency vote	52,528	271,740	261,458
% and swing	2.3% ▲1.0pp	11.8% ▼10.1pp	11.4% ▲4.5pp
Regional vote	321,964	271,550	215,624
% and swing	14.0% ▲5.9pp	11.8% ▼11.7pp	9.4% ▲4.3pp
- Results by constituencies and regions
First Minister before election
John Swinney
SNP
First Minister after election
John Swinney
SNP

An election for the Scottish Parliament was held on 7 May 2026 to elect all 129 members of the Scottish Parliament. It was the seventh general election since the devolved parliament was established in 1999. The governing Scottish National Party (SNP) secured a fifth consecutive term as they emerged as the largest party, despite losing six seats and falling seven short of a majority.

In the previous election, held five years prior, Nicola Sturgeon led the SNP to a fourth term in government, falling only a seat short of a majority. The party later entered a power-sharing agreement with the Scottish Greens. Sturgeon resigned in 2023 and was succeeded by Humza Yousaf. Yousaf ended the agreement with the Greens and later resigned after the Greens tabled a motion of no confidence vote. Swinney succeeded him amid party turmoil in the SNP. In the 2024 UK general election, Scottish Labour won a landslide and made a resurgence of support - its best result since 2010 in Scotland. Polls in the run-up to the election campaign suggested the SNP would emerge as the largest party for a fifth Holyrood election running, although focus weighed on who would emerge as the second largest, with the rise of Reform UK across the UK.

The SNP won the election with 58 MSPs, falling seven short of a majority. Reform and Labour both won 17 seats, followed by the Greens on 15, the Conservatives on 12 and the Liberal Democrats on 10. It was the worst performance at a Scottish Parliament election for both Labour and Conservatives, with the former's seat share decreasing for the sixth consecutive election. Conversely, the Greens had their best-ever result, going into double figures for the first time and winning their first constituency seats. Reform enjoyed a rise in support, although they were the only party not to win constituency seats.

The key issues dominating the election included the economy, income tax and the cost of living, healthcare, energy, housing and immigration—although the last is a reserved issue, it remained a topic of debate. The SNP also argued the case for another referendum on Scottish independence. This was the first election contested using the new constituency boundaries implemented following the Second Periodic review. The election was held on the same day as the local elections in England and the Senedd election in Wales, in which Plaid Cymru were victorious. With Sinn Féin also in government in Northern Ireland, this would mark the first time that all three devolved nations were governed by first ministers opposed to the United Kingdom.

== Background ==
=== Electoral events ===
==== 2021 Scottish Parliament election ====
Since the 2021 Scottish Parliament election, Scottish politics has undergone a period of significant leadership transitions and shifting governing arrangements. In that election, the Scottish National Party (SNP) won 64 seats, falling one short of an overall majority. This led Nicola Sturgeon to negotiate the Bute House Agreement with the Scottish Greens, which brought Green MSPs into the government for the first time to secure a pro-independence majority in the chamber.

==== SNP leadership changes ====
Sturgeon's final term as First Minister was marked by a renewed push for a second independence referendum, though this was checked by a UK Supreme Court ruling in 2022 stating Holyrood could not legislate for a vote without Westminster's consent. Her government also faced intense debate over the Gender Recognition Reform (Scotland) Bill, which was passed by the Scottish Parliament but was ultimately blocked by the UK government. In February 2023, Sturgeon unexpectedly announced her resignation, citing the personal toll of the office and a desire to make way for new leadership.

Humza Yousaf won the subsequent turbulent leadership contest, becoming Scotland's first ethnic minority First Minister. His tenure was characterised by the ongoing Operation Branchform police investigation into SNP finances and a difficult economic climate. In April 2024, Yousaf unilaterally terminated the Bute House Agreement with the Greens. This move backfired when the Greens withdrew their support for his leadership, and facing an imminent vote of no confidence, Yousaf resigned after thirteen months in office.

John Swinney, a former Deputy First Minister and the former SNP leader while the party was in opposition, was elected unopposed to succeed Yousaf and led a minority government prior to the election. His leadership focused on party stabilisation following the 2024 UK general election, which saw Labour win a landslide victory and Scottish Labour replacing the SNP as the largest party in Scotland at Westminster. However, the SNP later recovered in the polls amid the unpopularity of both Prime Minister Keir Starmer and Scottish Labour Leader Anas Sarwar, with Swinney leading his party into the 2026 election and promising to deliver independence if re-elected. While the constitutional debate around independence stayed central to Scottish discourse during Swinney's premiership, the immediate path to a second referendum remained stalled by legal and political obstacles.

==== Conservative leadership changes ====
In May 2024, the Conservative prime minister Rishi Sunak called the 2024 United Kingdom general election to be held on 4 July, which was won by the Labour Party, with Keir Starmer succeeding Sunak as prime minister the following day. Amid the national election, Scottish Conservative leader Douglas Ross announced his intention to resign as leader of the Scottish Conservatives upon the election of his successor.

Russell Findlay, who had been considered a frontrunner for the position, announced his candidacy for leader on 22 July. Facing fellow MSPs Murdo Fraser and Meghan Gallacher, Findlay received 52% of MSP endorsements and was elected leader with 61.7% of the first-preference vote among party members. On 27 September he become leader of the largest opposition party in the Scottish Parliament. He formed his Shadow Cabinet on 8 October.

==== Anas Sarwar's call for Keir Starmer's resignation ====
On 9 February 2026, Scottish Labour leader Anas Sarwar held a press conference in Glasgow to publicly call for Prime Minister Keir Starmer to resign. Sarwar stated that "the distraction needs to end and the leadership in Downing Street has to change," citing a series of "mistakes" that he believed were undermining Labour's prospects in the upcoming elections. Sarwar described Starmer as "a decent man" and "a friend", but argued that his (that is, Sarwar's) primary loyalty was to Scotland and that the Prime Minister's continued leadership was sabotaging the party's future.

The primary catalyst for this intervention was the fallout from the appointment of Peter Mandelson as British Ambassador to the United States, which had come under intense scrutiny due to Mandelson's past ties to child sex offender Jeffrey Epstein. Sarwar's move followed the resignations of Starmer's chief of staff, Morgan McSweeney, and director of communications, Tim Allan. Sarwar said he had spoken to Starmer earlier that day to inform him of his decision, stating that the two had "disagreed" on the necessity of his resignation.

In the immediate aftermath, senior Cabinet members including Deputy Prime Minister David Lammy and Chancellor Rachel Reeves rallied behind Starmer, emphasising his mandate and urging party unity. Within Scottish Labour, the move caused significant friction; while Monica Lennon supported Sarwar's leadership, others such as former Scottish Secretary Ian Murray branded the call a threat to party stability. First Minister John Swinney and Scottish Conservative leader Russell Findlay characterised the situation as "opportunism" and a "meltdown". Addressing the Parliamentary Labour Party later that evening, Starmer remained defiant, stating he had "won every fight I've ever been in" and refused to walk away.

==== Easdales donation offer to Scottish Labour ====
In January 2026, the millionaire Easdale brothers "reportedly pledged a six-figure donation to Scottish Labour". Sarwar said that they did not make any policy demands of Scottish Labour but that they want the SNP out of power.

==== Alba Party financial and leadership crisis ====
In February 2026, the Alba Party entered a major financial and organisational crisis which ultimately led to the party being wound down ahead of the election. Party leader Kenny MacAskill warned members that Alba was unlikely to contest the election due to financial irregularities linked to alleged fraud and declining income, while discussions were ongoing with the Electoral Commission regarding compliance and the party's future registration. The announcement triggered internal divisions within the party, with several National Executive Committee members and candidates disputing the leadership's handling of the situation and calling for a membership ballot on whether Alba should stand in the election. The dispute escalated publicly in late February and early March, amid reports of resignations, candidate withdrawals and disagreements over access to party membership data. Party officials later stated that Alba was financially insolvent and unable to meet existing debts, while internal factions argued the party could continue if leadership changed and additional funds were raised.

On 8 March 2026, MacAskill announced that Alba would be wound down due to its financial position, effectively ending the party founded by Alex Salmond in 2021 and confirming it would not participate in the election.

==== Other elections ====
Two further elections affecting Scotland took place between the 2021 and 2026 Scottish Parliament elections:

- 5 May 2022: Scottish local government elections.
- 4 July 2024: United Kingdom general election.

=== Composition of the Scottish Parliament before dissolution ===
Affiliation	Members		
Affiliation	Elected in 2021	Before dissolution	Difference
SNP	64	60	▼4
Conservative	31	28	▼3
Labour	22 (Note: Includes 11 MSPs sponsored by the Co-operative Party, who are designated Labour and Co-operative.)	20 (Note: Includes 10 MSPs sponsored by the Co-operative Party, who are designated Labour and Co-operative.)	▼2
Green	8	7	▼1
Liberal Democrats	4	5	▲1
Reform	0	1	▲1
Independent	0	7	▲7
Presiding Officer	0	1	▲1
Total MSPs	129	129	Steady
Government majority	–1	–9	▼8

== Date ==
Under the Scottish Elections (Reform) Act 2020, ordinary general elections to the Scottish Parliament are held on the first Thursday in May five years after the 2021 election, i.e. on 7 May 2026. This Act superseded the Scotland Act 1998, which had set elections in every fourth year. The close of nominations was 1 April. The count began at 9 am on 8 May. The reason for holding the count during the day rather than the more usual overnight count was to "support increased public engagement while increasing staff availability and recognising the operational complexities of the Election Countgiven for this is to ensure staff welfare and to reduce the risks relating to accuracy of the count process."

== Retiring MSPs ==
42 MSPs did not seek re-election, which was a record. Eight of those stepping down were first elected at the formation of the Scottish Parliament in 1999, but only five have had unbroken service. Richard Lochhead briefly resigned his regional seat to contest a Moray by-election in 2006; Rhoda Grant lost her seat in 2003 and returned at the 2007 election; Sarah Boyack lost her seat in the 2016 election and returned in 2019. Of the original MSPs from 1999 with unbroken service, only three contested the 2026 election: Jackie Baillie, Fergus Ewing and John Swinney.

Members of Scottish Parliament not standing for re-election
MSP	Seat	First elected	Party	Date announced
John Mason	Glasgow Shettleston	2011	Independent (elected as SNP)	25 April 2023
James Dornan	Glasgow Cathcart	2011	SNP	10 August 2023
Christine Grahame	Midlothian South, Tweeddale and Lauderdale	1999	SNP	29 September 2024
Ruth Maguire	Cunninghame South	2016	SNP	16 November 2024
Elena Whitham	Carrick, Cumnock and Doon Valley	2021	SNP	25 November 2024
Humza Yousaf	Glasgow Pollok	2011	SNP	17 December 2024
Oliver Mundell	Dumfriesshire	2016	Conservative	9 January 2025
Richard Lochhead	Moray	1999	SNP	26 January 2025
Joe FitzPatrick	Dundee City West	2007	SNP	28 January 2025
Michelle Thomson	Falkirk East	2021	SNP	29 January 2025
Audrey Nicoll	Aberdeen South and North Kincardine	2021	SNP	9 February 2025
Evelyn Tweed	Stirling	2021	SNP	12 February 2025
Graeme Dey	Angus South	2011	SNP	19 February 2025
Beatrice Wishart	Shetland	2019	Liberal Democrats	20 February 2025
Liz Smith	Mid Scotland and Fife	2007	Conservative	25 February 2025
Rona Mackay	Strathkelvin and Bearsden	2016	SNP	25 February 2025
Edward Mountain	Highlands and Islands	2016	Conservative	26 February 2025
Gordon MacDonald	Edinburgh Pentlands	2011	SNP	28 February 2025
Annabelle Ewing	Cowdenbeath	2011	SNP	2 March 2025
Richard Leonard	Central Scotland	2016	Labour	4 March 2025
Shona Robison	Dundee City East	1999	SNP	5 March 2025
Fiona Hyslop	Linlithgow	1999	SNP	5 March 2025
Alex Rowley	Mid Scotland and Fife	2014	Labour	6 March 2025
Bill Kidd	Glasgow Anniesland	2007	SNP	12 March 2025
Nicola Sturgeon	Glasgow Southside	1999	SNP	12 March 2025
Natalie Don-Innes	Renfrewshire North and West	2021	SNP	13 March 2025
Mairi Gougeon	Angus North and Mearns	2016	SNP	14 March 2025
Michael Matheson	Falkirk West	1999	SNP	16 March 2025
Willie Coffey	Kilmarnock and Irvine Valley	2007	SNP	17 March 2025
Stephanie Callaghan	Uddingston and Bellshill	2021	SNP	22 March 2025
Douglas Ross	Highlands and Islands	2016	Conservative	25 March 2025
Maurice Golden	North East Scotland	2016	Conservative	7 April 2025
Rhoda Grant	Highlands and Islands	1999	Labour	15 May 2025
Sarah Boyack	Lothian	1999	Labour	16 June 2025
Alison Johnstone	Lothian	2011	Presiding Officer (Note: Originally elected as Scottish Green MSP)	20 June 2025
Kate Forbes	Skye, Lochaber and Badenoch	2016	SNP	4 August 2025
Mercedes Villalba	North East Scotland	2021	Labour	2 September 2025
Tess White	North East Scotland	2021	Conservative	2 September 2025
Kevin Stewart	Aberdeen Central	2011	SNP	8 September 2025
Pam Duncan-Glancy	Glasgow	2021	Independent (elected as Labour)	21 December 2025
Foysol Choudhury	Lothian	2021	Independent (elected as Labour)	9 April 2026
Colin Smyth	South Scotland	2016	Independent (elected as Labour)	9 April 2026

=== MSPs who lost their seats ===
MSP	Constituency/Region	First elected	Party
Angus Robertson	Edinburgh Central	2021	SNP
Kaukab Stewart	Glasgow Kelvin (contested Glasgow Southside)	2021	SNP
Emma Harper	South Scotland (contested Galloway and West Dumfries)	2016	SNP
Alasdair Allan	Na h-Eileanan an Iar	2007	SNP
Monica Lennon	Central Scotland (contested Rutherglen and Cambuslang)	2016	Labour
Martin Whitfield	South Scotland (contested East Lothian Coast and Lammermuirs)	2021	Labour
Davy Russell	Hamilton, Larkhall and Stonehouse	2025	Labour
Paul O'Kane	West Scotland (contested Renfrewshire West and Levern Valley)	2021	Labour
Sue Webber	Lothian (contested Edinburgh South Western)	2021	Conservative
Annie Wells	Glasgow (contested Rutherglen and Cambuslang)	2016	Conservative
Sandesh Gulhane	Glasgow (contested Glasgow Anniesland)	2021	Conservative
Jamie Halcro Johnston	Highlands and Islands (contested Orkney Islands)	2017	Conservative
Roz McCall	Mid Scotland and Fife (contested Perthshire South and Kinross-shire)	2022	Conservative
Alexander Stewart	Mid Scotland and Fife (contested Clackmannanshire and Dunblane)	2016	Conservative
Sharon Dowey	South Scotland (contested Ayr)	2021	Conservative
Brian Whittle	South Scotland (contested East Kilbride)	2016	Conservative
Jackson Carlaw	Eastwood	2007	Conservative
Pam Gosal	West Scotland (contested Strathkelvin and Bearsden)	2021	Conservative
Jamie Greene	West Scotland (contested Inverclyde)	2016	Liberal Democrats
Ash Regan	Edinburgh Eastern (contested Edinburgh and Lothians East)	2016	Independent
Fergus Ewing	Inverness and Nairn	1999	Independent
Jeremy Balfour	Lothian (contested Edinburgh and Lothians East)	2016	Independent

== Parties ==
=== Contesting constituency and/or regional ballot ===
Parties	Regions	Constituencies	Seats at dissolution
Scottish National Party; Pàrtaidh Nàiseanta na h-Alba	8	73	60 / 129 (47%)
Scottish Conservative and Unionist Party; Pàrtaidh Tòraidheach na h-Alba	8	73	28 / 129 (22%)
Scottish Labour (Note: Includes 10 MSPs sponsored by the Co-operative Party, who are designated Labour and Co-operative.); Pàrtaidh Làbarach na h-Alba	8	73	20 / 129 (16%)
Scottish Greens; Pàrtaidh Uaine na h-Alba	8	6	7 / 129 (5%)
Scottish Liberal Democrats; Pàrtaidh Libearalach Deamocratach na h-Alba	8	73	5 / 129 (4%)
Reform UK Scotland; Pàrtaidh Ath-leasachaidh Alba	8	73	1 / 129 (0.8%)
Independents	6	21	8 / 129 (6%) (Note: Including the Presiding Officer, who resigns party membership upon election to the post.)
Alliance to Liberate Scotland/Sovereignty	8	14	0 / 129 (0%)
Scottish Common Party	3	7	0 / 129 (0%)
Independence for Scotland Party; Pàrtaidh Neo-eisimeileachd do dh'Alba	7	3	0 / 129 (0%)
Workers Party of Great Britain	5	4	0 / 129 (0%)
Advance UK	5	3	0 / 129 (0%)
Independent Green Voice	8	0	0 / 129 (0%)
Scottish Socialist Party; Pàrtaidh Sòisealach na h-Alba	8	0	0 / 129 (0%)
Scottish Family Party	8	0	0 / 129 (0%)
Scottish Libertarian Party; Pàrtaidh Libeirtèireach na h-Alba	6	1	0 / 129 (0%)
Trade Unionist and Socialist Coalition	0	6	0 / 129 (0%)
UK Independence Party	4	0	0 / 129 (0%)
Alliance for Democracy and Freedom	1	3	0 / 129 (0%)
Abolish the Scottish Parliament Party	1	2	0 / 129 (0%)
Scottish Christian Party	2	0	0 / 129 (0%)
Edinburgh and East Lothian People	1	1	0 / 129 (0%)
Freedom Alliance	0	1	0 / 129 (0%)
Heritage Party	1	0	0 / 129 (0%)
Animal Welfare Party	1	0	0 / 129 (0%)
Scottish Rural Party	1	0	0 / 129 (0%)
Scottish Liberal Party	1	0	0 / 129 (0%)
Communist Party of Britain	1	0	0 / 129 (0%)
Equality Party	1	0	0 / 129 (0%)
Socialist Labour Party	1	0	0 / 129 (0%)
Source: BBC

=== Other parties ===
On 21 February 2026, Alba Party leader Kenny MacAskill announced that the party was unlikely to be able to stand candidates due to an internal financial crisis. After this announcement Tommy Sheridan, Angus MacNeil, Christina Hendry and Suzanne Blackley issued a joint statement in which they offered to take over leadership of the Alba Party to ensure it can contest the election but this ultimately never materialised. On 8 March 2026, MacAskill announced that the party would deregister and therefore would be unable to stand in the election.

Your Party originally intended to stand candidates, but it was later reported that they would miss the deadline due to what Scottish representative Niall Christie called "inaction and decisions taken by Your Party at a UK level".

== Election system, seats, and regions ==
The total number of Members of the Scottish Parliament (MSPs) elected to the Parliament is 129. The Scottish Parliament uses an additional member system (AMS), designed to produce approximate proportional representation for each region. There are eight regions, each sub-divided into smaller constituencies. There are a total of 73 constituencies. Each constituency elects one MSP by the plurality (first past the post) system of election. Each region elects seven additional MSPs using an additional member system. A modified D'Hondt method, using the constituency results, is used to elect these additional MSPs.

The Scottish Parliament constituencies have not been coterminous with Scottish Westminster constituencies since the 2005 general election, when the 72 former UK Parliament constituencies were replaced with a new set of 59, generally larger, constituencies (see Scottish Parliament (Constituencies) Act 2004). The boundaries used for the Scottish Parliament elections were then revised for the 2011 election. The Boundary Commission also recommended changes to the electoral regions used to elect "list" members of the Scottish Parliament, which were also implemented in 2011. The Second Periodic Review of constituency and regional boundaries began in September 2022 and was completed by May 2025. The proposals were formally approved in October 2025, establishing the constituencies and regions to form the basis for the 2026 election.

== Campaign ==
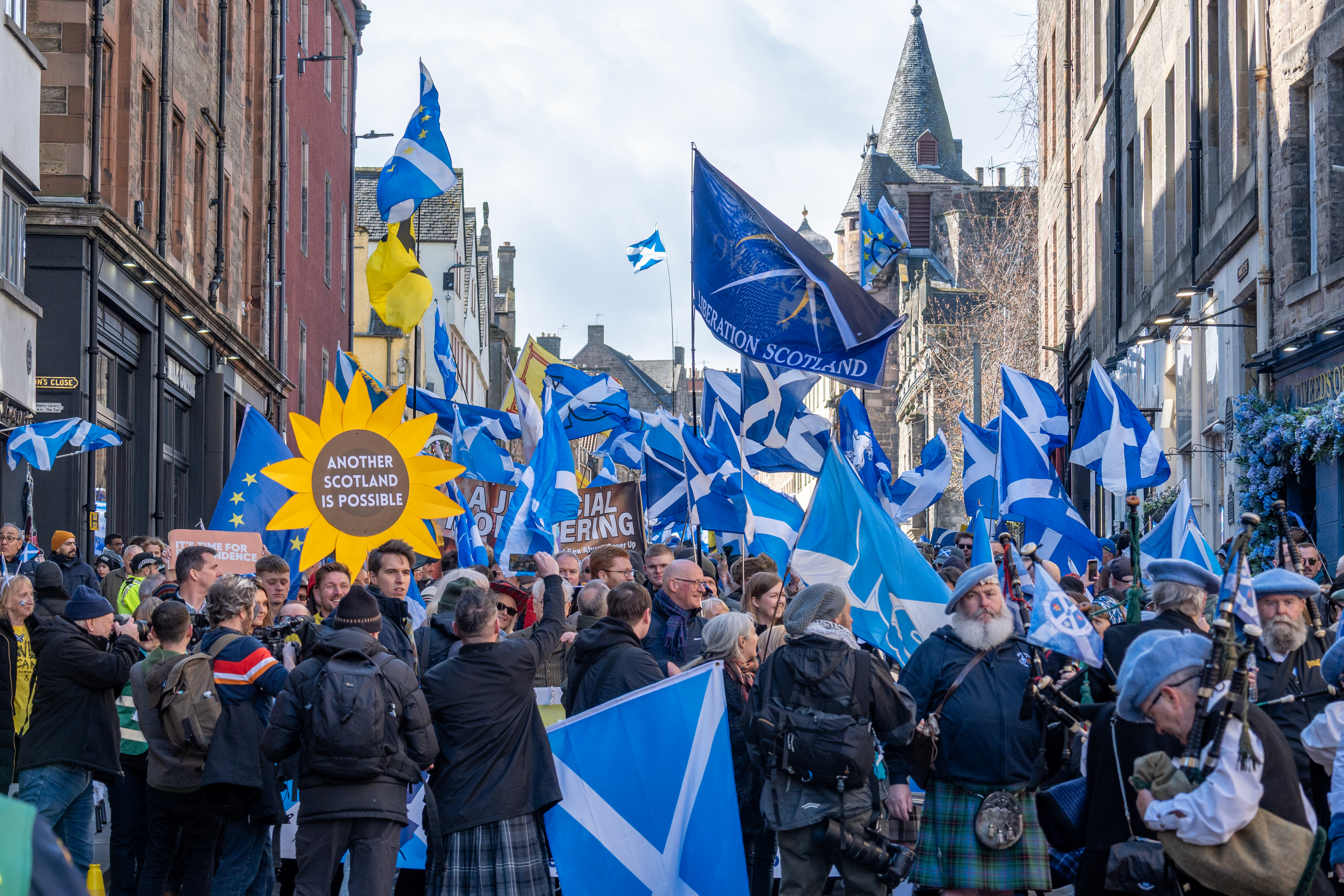
Scottish independence was a major issue of the election, particularly for the SNP

According to Professor John Curtice, main campaign issues included the economy, cost of living, health and social care services and immigration. Other issues include energy, housing and Scottish independence. Another issue is Starmer's leadership after Sarwar called for him to resign. On 10 March 2026, BBC Scotland's podcast Scotcast started airing leader interviews with the party leaders in the run-up to the election.

On 19 March, Malcolm Offord and Nigel Farage launched Reform UK's manifesto in Bishopton, Renfrewshire, positioning itself as a challenger to the established parties with a platform centred on tax cuts, immigration control and economic deregulation. A key proposal is to reduce Scottish income tax to levels below those in the rest of the UK, alongside broader commitments to cut public spending and roll back green policies in order to lower energy costs. The party has also emphasised stricter law and order measures, opposition to what it describes as “net zero ideology”, and support for domestic energy production and business growth through reduced regulation. They also unveiled their constituency candidates. The following day, Stuart Niven, the candidate for Dundee City West, was suspended following revelations that he was disqualified as a company director. In the days that followed, four more candidates stood down from standing for Reform UK.

On 21 March, the Scottish Greens announced a commitment to raising the minimum wage for care workers to £15 per hour. Other policies announced by the party include, expanding funded childcare, higher tax on the super rich, big businesses, big banks, as well as casinos and bookies, and a commitment to free bus travel for everyone in Scotland via a bus network under public control.

On 27 March, The National announced that they would be hosting a hustings which would feature representatives of the six main parties to be hosted on 7 April however the Conservatives and Labour declined to appear, and on 6 April, the day before the hustings, Thomas Kerr, the Reform representative pulled out, criticising The National and accusing them of spreading misinformation on his party's stance on corporal punishment in schools. The Holyrood Sources podcast announced that they would host a hustings event with the party leaders on 1 April.

On 31 March, Guy Ingerson was replaced by Maggie Chapman as top candidate in North East Scotland. On 1 April, Scottish Labour candidate for Glasgow Southside Mohammed Ameen was replaced by Rashid Hussain following criminal charges. SNP candidate and leader of the SNP group on North Lanarkshire Council, Tracy Carragher was suspended from the party and dropped as an election candidate.

On 4 April, the Scottish Greens announced a commitment to end all NHS dental charges, ensuring free dental care for all in Scotland. The party also stated that it would expand the role of dental therapists in order to speed up waiting times.

Russell Findlay launched the Scottish Conservatives manifesto in Edinburgh on 7 April with a strong emphasis on the cost of living, positioning the election as a choice between continued public spending under the SNP and lower-tax, “common sense” economic policies. Key proposals included cutting income tax, supporting North Sea oil and gas development, and reducing what the party describes as wasteful government spending. The party has also focused on improving public services such as healthcare and education, alongside a broader agenda centred on economic growth, law and order, and opposition to further tax rises.

On 12 April, UK Health Secretary Wes Streeting stated on LBC that the UK Government would never grant the Scottish Parliament the powers to hold a second independence referendum. These comments were criticised by the SNP and Scottish Greens. LBC journalist Gina Davidson stated that Streeting's comments might have just made the election catch fire and result in SNP supporters to go and turnout to vote. The subject was brought up in the leader's debate hosted in Paisley that evening where Anas Sarwar was challenged and refused to answer on what mechanism would need to be in place for a second referendum to be granted.

Scottish Labour leader Anas Sarwar launched his party's manifesto in Edinburgh on 13 April, presenting the election as an opportunity to “fix” public services after nearly two decades of SNP government, appealing to the public to give him “five years to fix the SNP's mess”. The manifesto outlined a programme focused on economic reform and public service investment, including plans to build over 50,000 affordable homes, recruit additional teachers, and reduce business rates. It also proposed tax changes aimed at easing pressure on middle-income earners, reforms to public bodies, and support for sectors such as the arts, alongside a more centrist economic approach that includes openness to new nuclear energy projects. On 14 April, the internal pro-LGBT group Scottish Labour Against Bigotry attacked the manifesto as "explicitly transphobic" due to its stated commitment to "single-[biological] sex spaces, in NHS wards, schools, sport and everyday life", and urged the electorate not to vote for the party.

On 14 April, the Scottish Greens launched their manifesto in Glasgow, presenting promises such as taking bus services into public ownership, introducing a universal basic income, and widening access to funded childcare.

The SNP launched their manifesto on 16 April in Glasgow with key pledges including capping the price of essential food items, introducing a £2 nationwide bus fare cap, and supporting business through a new “major projects office” and high-growth unit. The party has committed to no income tax increases for most earners while proposing targeted taxes on large corporations, alongside increased investment in healthcare and education. Additional policies include banning smartphones in classrooms and a £10,000 deposit support scheme for first-time buyers, with Scottish independence remaining a central objective.

The Liberal Democrats launched their manifesto on 17 April.

=== Labour–Reform UK alliance claims ===
Claims and speculation surrounding a potential alliance between Scottish Labour and Reform UK became a significant point of contention during the campaign period, particularly in exchanges between party leaders and during televised debates.

During the SNP's campaign launch on 26 March, First Minister John Swinney argued that the absence of an SNP majority could lead to what he described as a “grubby deal” between Anas Sarwar and Reform UK. Swinney framed the prospect as a risk of Labour seeking power through informal arrangements with parties on the right, positioning the SNP as the only safeguard against such an outcome, citing issues within Fife Council as a recent example. Sarwar rejected the claim, stating that Scottish Labour would not enter into any agreements or cooperation with Reform UK, and reiterated that his party's focus was on winning a mandate to govern in its own right.

The issue gained further prominence on 30 March, when debate emerged over Scottish Labour's electoral strategy following its campaign launch, after reports suggested the party was exploring a pathway to power that could rely on a fragmented parliament and a strong performance by Reform UK on the regional list. Senior Labour figures indicated that gains in key central belt constituencies, combined with vote splitting among unionist parties, could potentially allow the party to form a minority government. However, polling experts, including Professor John Curtice and academic Mark McGeoghegan, expressed strong scepticism, noting that Labour remained significantly behind the SNP in most polls and that the rise of Reform UK was more likely to divide the anti-SNP vote than to assist Labour. Analysts described the scenario as highly unlikely without a substantial and unprecedented shift in voter support. Scottish Conservative leader Russell Findlay refused to rule out that his party would vote to make Sarwar the First Minister in this scenario.

During the Channel 4 News leaders' debate on 14 April, Malcolm Offord claimed that Anas Sarwar had suggested cooperation between Scottish Labour and Reform UK to prevent the SNP from remaining in power. Offord alleged that the conversation took place following the recording of Question Time at Paisley Town Hall in December 2025. Sarwar rejected the claim following the debate, describing it as untrue and reiterating that Scottish Labour would not enter into any deals or arrangements with Reform UK.

The dispute continued after the broadcast, with Offord standing by his remarks in subsequent media appearances, while Sarwar described the allegation as a "desperate lie" and repeated that there would be no deals or "backroom stitch-ups". The row was amplified by other parties during the campaign, with the SNP citing the exchange as evidence of a potential post-election alignment, while Labour and other parties dismissed the claims as speculative and politically motivated. Reform UK councillor and candidate Thomas Kerr stated that Sarwar had made similar remarks to him in November 2025, claiming that Labour MP Maureen Burke was present during the exchange, while Offord said an aide had also witnessed his alleged conversation. Reform sources further suggested comparable discussions had taken place in Holyrood in recent months.

On 20 April, the dispute widened further following additional claims and counterclaims involving Graham Simpson and Kerr. Sarwar alleged that Simpson had privately criticised senior Reform figures, claims which Simpson rejected as “completely ridiculous”. Simpson in turn asserted that Sarwar had approached him on three occasions in Holyrood to discuss working together to remove the SNP from power, echoing similar claims made by Offord and Kerr in the preceding days. Sarwar denied these allegations, maintaining that no such discussions had taken place.

=== Election debates and hustings ===
2026 Scottish Parliament election debates and hustings
Date	Organisers	Moderator(s)	P Present (Note: Denotes a main invitee attending the event.) S Surrogate (Note: Denotes a main invitee not attending the event, sending a surrogate in their place.) NI Not invited A Absent invitee INV Invited							
Date	Organisers	Moderator(s)	SNP	Conservatives	Labour	Greens	Lib Dems	Reform	Venue	Ref.
31 March	The Scotsman (Note: Co-organised with Scotland 2050)	Alistair Grant	S McAllan (Note: Màiri McAllan, Cabinet Secretary for Housing (Scotland))	S Fraser (Note: Murdo Fraser, Conservative MSP)	S Whitfield (Note: Martin Whitfield, Labour MSP)	S Harvie (Note: Patrick Harvie, MSP and former co-leader of the Scottish Greens)	P Cole-Hamilton	P Offord	Assembly Rooms, Edinburgh	
1 April	Holyrood Sources	Calum Macdonald (Note: Alongside Andy Maciver and Geoff Aberdein)	P Swinney	P Findlay	P Sarwar	P Greer	P Cole-Hamilton	P Offord	Easter Road Stadium, Edinburgh	
2 April	Prosper	Gina Davidson	P Swinney	P Findlay	P Sarwar	P Greer	P Cole-Hamilton	P Offord	Royal Bank of Scotland, Edinburgh	
7 April	The National	Assa Samake-Roman	S Middleton (Note: Jack Middleton, SNP candidate)	A (Note: Slot replaced by Richie Venton of the Scottish Socialist Party)	A (Note: Slot replaced by Eve Comrie of Alliance to Liberate Scotland)	S Bruce (Note: Scottish Greens candidate for Glasgow Southside)	S Jardine (Note: Christine Jardine, Scottish Liberal Democrats MP)	A Kerr	Virtual	
12 April	BBC Scotland (Debate Night Leader's Special)	Stephen Jardine	P Swinney	P Findlay	P Sarwar	P Greer	P Cole-Hamilton	P Offord	Paisley Town Hall, Paisley	
14 April	Channel 4 News	Krishnan Guru-Murthy	P Swinney	P Findlay	P Sarwar	P Mackay	P Cole-Hamilton	P Offord	Merchant City, Glasgow	
23 April	BBC (Question Time Election Special)	Fiona Bruce	S McAllan (Note: Màiri McAllan, Cabinet Secretary for Housing (Scotland))	P Findlay	P Sarwar	P Mackay	P Cole-Hamilton	P Offord	Beach Ballroom, Aberdeen	
28 April	STV News	Colin Mackay	P Swinney	P Findlay	P Sarwar	P Greer	P Cole-Hamilton	P Offord	Signet Library, Edinburgh	
29 April	BBC Scotland (Debate Night Young Voters Special)	Stephen Jardine	S Middleton (Note: Jack Middleton, SNP candidate)	S Gallacher (Note: Meghan Gallacher, Conservative MSP)	S Baillie (Note: Jackie Baillie, Labour MSP)	P Mackay	S Greene (Note: Jamie Greene, Lib Dem MSP)	S McGuire (Note: Jamie McGuire, Reform candidate)	Pacific Quay, Glasgow	
3 May	The Courier	Sean O'Neil	P Swinney	P Findlay	P Sarwar	P Mackay	P Cole-Hamilton	P Offord	DC Thomson HQ, Dundee	

== Opinion polling ==

Key

SNP – Scottish National Party
Conservative – Scottish Conservatives
Labour – Scottish Labour
Lib Dem – Scottish Liberal Democrats
Green – Scottish Greens
Alba – Alba Party
Reform – Reform Party Scotland

== Results ==
Party	Constituency			Regional			Total seats	+/–
Party	Votes	%	Seats	Votes	%	Seats	Total seats	+/–
Scottish National Party	877,077	38.18	57	625,949	27.18	1	58	−6
Labour (Note: Includes 7 MSPs sponsored by the Co-operative Party, who are designated Labour and Co-operative.)	440,708	19.18	3	368,785	16.01	14	17	−5
Reform UK	361,994	15.76	0	383,425	16.65	17	17	+17
Greens	52,528	2.29	2	321,964	13.98	13	15	+7
Conservative	271,740	11.83	4	271,550	11.79	8	12	−19
Liberal Democrats	261,458	11.38	7	215,624	9.36	3	10	+6
Independents	17,923	0.78	0	16,879	0.73	0	0	0
Alliance to Liberate Scotland/Sovereignty	4,768	0.21	0	19,318	0.84	0	0	New
Independent Green Voice				19,975	0.87	0	0	0
Scottish Family Party				17,136	0.74	0	0	0
Independence for Scotland Party				10,246	0.44	0	0	New
Scottish Socialist Party				8,326	0.36	0	0	New
Workers Party	1,321	0.06	0	3,402	0.15	0	0	New
Scottish Common Party	2,031	0.09	0	1,557	0.07	0	0	New
Trade Unionist and Socialist Coalition	2,740	0.12	0				0	0
Advance UK	328	0.01	0	2,145	0.09	0	0	New
Alliance for Democracy and Freedom	1,133	0.05	0	1,252	0.05	0	0	New
Socialist Labour Party				2,260	0.10	0	0	New
Animal Welfare Party				2,032	0.09	0	0	0
Scottish Libertarian Party	56	0.00	0	1,909	0.08	0	0	0
Scottish Christian Party				1,907	0.08	0	0	New
Liberal Party				1,748	0.08	0	0	0
Edinburgh and East Lothian People	524	0.02	0	1,073	0.05	0	0	New
Abolish the Scottish Parliament	668	0.03	0	1,015	0.04	0	0	0
UKIP				1,226	0.05	0	0	0
Scottish Rural Party				772	0.03	0	0	New
Communist Party of Britain				672	0.03	0	0	0
Heritage Party				471	0.02	0	0	New
Freedom Alliance (UK)	212	0.01	0				0	0
Equality Party				276	0.01	0	0	New
Total	2,297,209	100.00	73	2,302,894	100.00	56	129	–
Valid votes	2,297,209	99.57		2,302,894	99.73			
Invalid/blank votes	10,000	0.43		6,137	0.27			
Total votes	2,307,209	100.00		2,309,031	100.00			
Registered voters/turnout	4,320,981	53.40		4,320,981	53.44			
Source: Electoral Management Board

Popular votes in the FPTP constituencies
1. Scottish National Party 877,077 (38.2%)
2. Scottish Labour 440,708 (19.2%)
3. Reform UK Scotland 361,994 (15.8%)
4. Scottish Conservatives 271,740 (11.9%)
5. Scottish Liberal Democrats 261,458 (11.4%)
6. Scottish Greens 52,528 (2.29%)
7. Independents 13,781 (0.60%)
8. Others 13,781 (0.60%)
Popular votes in the electoral regions
1. Scottish National Party 625,949 (27.2%)
2. Scottish Labour 368,785 (16.0%)
3. Reform UK Scotland 383,425 (16.7%)
4. Scottish Greens 321,964 (14.0%)
5. Scottish Conservatives 271,550 (11.8%)
6. Scottish Liberal Democrats 215,624 (9.36%)
7. Others 115,321 (5.01%)

=== Constituencies which changed hands ===
Constituency	Gain	Loss
Edinburgh Central	Green	SNP
Glasgow Southside	Green	SNP
Eastwood	SNP	Conservative
Shetland Islands	SNP	Lib Dem
Na h-Eileanan an Iar	Labour	SNP
Caithness, Sutherland & Ross	Lib Dem	SNP
Edinburgh Northern	Lib Dem	SNP
Skye, Lochaber and Badenoch	Lib Dem	SNP
Strathkelvin and Bearsden	Lib Dem	SNP

=== Central Scotland and Lothians West ===
2026 Scottish Parliament election: Central Scotland and Lothians West
Constituency	Elected member	Result
Airdrie	Neil Gray	SNP hold
Almond Valley	Angela Constance	SNP hold
Bathgate	Pauline Stafford	SNP hold
Coatbridge and Chryston	Fulton MacGregor	SNP hold
Cumbernauld and Kilsyth	Jamie Hepburn	SNP hold
Falkirk East and Linlithgow	Martyn Day	SNP hold
Falkirk West	Gary Bouse	SNP hold
Motherwell and Wishaw	Clare Adamson	SNP hold
Uddingston and Bellshill	Steven Bonnar	SNP hold

2026 Scottish Parliament election: Central Scotland and Lothians West regional list
Party	Elected candidates	Seats	+/−	Votes	%	+/−%
SNP		0	Steady	86,809	30.7	▼14.4
Reform	Graham Simpson; Mandy Lindsay; Amanda Bland	3	▲3	58,334	20.6	▲20.4
Labour	Mark Griffin; Jenny Young	2	▼1	57,103	20.2	▼2.6
Green	Gillian Mackay	1	▲1	34,415	12.2	▲5.9
Conservative	Meghan Gallacher	1	▼2	19,450	6.9	▼11.8

=== Glasgow ===
2026 Scottish Parliament election: Glasgow
Constituency	Elected member	Result
Glasgow Anniesland	Colm Merrick	SNP hold
Glasgow Baillieston and Shettleston	David Linden	SNP hold
Glasgow Cathcart and Pollok	Zen Ghani	SNP hold
Glasgow Central	Alison Thewliss	SNP hold
Glasgow Easterhouse and Springburn	Ivan McKee	SNP hold
Glasgow Kelvin and Maryhill	Bob Doris	SNP hold
Glasgow Southside	Holly Bruce	Green gain from SNP
Rutherglen and Cambuslang	Clare Haughey	SNP hold

2026 Scottish Parliament election: Glasgow regional list
Party	Elected candidates	Seats	+/−	Votes	%	+/−%
SNP		0	Steady	68,669	27.5	▼16.1
Green	Patrick Harvie; Iris Duane	2	▲1	58,881	23.6	▲11.5
Labour	Anas Sarwar; Pauline McNeill; Paul Sweeney	3	▼1	47,795	19.2	▼5.2
Reform	Thomas Kerr; Kim Schmulian	2	▲2	38,341	15.4	▲15.2
Conservative		0	▼2	10,621	4.3	▼7.8

== Results by constituency and region ==
=== Constituencies ===
Seat	SNP	Labour	Conservative	Greens	Lib Dem	Reform UK	Other
Aberdeen Central	**Jack Middleton**; **11,974**	Jenny Laing; 5,002	Stewart Whyte; 3,688		Yi-pei Chou Turvey; 2,563	James Wyllie; 3,936	
Aberdeen Deeside and North Kincardine	**Stephen Flynn**; **11,788**	Matthew Lee; 2,805	Liam Kerr; 10,544		Mel Sullivan; 2,880	Duncan Massey; 6,113	Iris Alexandra Leask (Ind, 431)
Aberdeen Donside	**Jackie Dunbar**; **11,760**	Lynn Thomson; 3,907	Hannah Powell; 4,496		Michael Turvey; 2,823	Claudia Leith; 7,029	Stephen Bowie (AtLS/Sovereignty, 481)
Aberdeenshire East	**Gillian Martin**; **11,624**	Janine Langler; 1,487	Douglas Lumsden; 10,681		David Evans; 3,999	John Crawley; 7,008	
Aberdeenshire West	Fatima Joji; 10,113	Kate Blake; 1,569	**Alexander Burnett**; **15,897**		Jeff Goodhall; 3,995	Jo Hart; 5,467	
Airdrie	**Neil Gray**; **10,711**	Suzanne Macleod; 6,201	Euan Blockley; 1,145		Ed Thornley; 660	Graham Simpson; 5,821	Brendan O’Donnell (Ind, 505); John Jo Leckie (ASP, 441)
Almond Valley	**Angela Constance**; **16,944**	Jordan Stokoe; 8,035	Damian Doran-Timson; 2,501		Caron Lindsay; 2,307	Malcolm Jones; 6,831	
Angus North and Mearns	**Dawn Black**; **11,308**	Simon Watson; 1,676	Tracey Smith; 8,058		Martyn Knights; 2,647	Laurie Carnie; 4,844	David Allen Neil (Ind, 468)
Angus South	**Lloyd Melville**; **13,289**	Heather Doran; 3,344	Angus MacMillan Douglas; 6,681		Isobel Knights; 2,488	Bill Reid; 5,583	
Argyll and Bute	**Jenni Minto**; **11,019**	Callum George; 1,740	Peter Wallace; 1,703		Alan Reid; 8,468	Amanda Hampsey; 3,678	Tommy Macpherson (Ind, 769); Mick Rice (Ind, 179)
Ayr	**Siobhian Brown**; **12,848**	Brian McGinley; 6,394	Sharon Dowey; 8,448		Desmond Buchanan; 1,427	Andrew Russell; 5,355	Denise Sommerville (Ind, 742); Muhammad Tufail (Scottish Common, 78)
Banffshire and Buchan Coast	**Karen Adam** **10,374**	Brooke Ritchie; 1,049	James Adams; 6,348		Leslie Tarr; 1,162	Conrad Ritchie; 10,010	N. D. R. McLennan (Ind, 555)
Bathgate	**Pauline Stafford**; **13,594**	Jenny Young; 8,007	Peter Heggie; 2,091		Stephen Harte; 1,937	David McLennan; 7,511	Gus Ferguson (BUP, 227)
Caithness, Sutherland and Ross	Maree Todd; 9,574	Eva Kestner; 894	Donald MacKenzie; 1,117		**David Green**; **14,666**	Steven Welsh; 3,900	Andrew MacDonald (AtLS/Sovereignty, 264); Matt Sheppard (Advance UK, 112)
Carrick, Cumnock and Doon Valley	**Katie Hagmann**; **9,610**	Carol Mochan; 6,671	Tracey Clark; 3,680		Karen Utting; 1,187	Andrew Scott; 6,988	Sean Davis (Ind, 412); Alison Hewett (Ind, 413)
Clackmannanshire and Dunblane	**Keith Brown**; **12,222**	Suzanne Grahame; 7,958	Alexander Stewart; 3,592		Sally Pattle; 1,841	Mike Collier; 5,181	Eva Comrie (AtLS, 1,228); Luca Scacchi (Ind, 345)
Clydebank and Milngavie	**Marie McNair**; **12,126**	Callum McNally; 7,929	Alix Mathieson; 1,820		Ben Langmead; 4,419	Andy White; 4,510	Claire Gallagher (Scottish Common, 647)
Clydesdale	**Màiri McAllan**; **13,006**	Lynsey Hamilton; 8,618	Julie Pirone; 4,344		Richard Brodie; 1,957	Daniel Clarke; 7,898	
Coatbridge and Chryston	**Fulton MacGregor**; **14,458**	Kieron Higgins; 7,682	Andy Bruce; 1,109		Daniel Mancini; 1,048	Mandy Lindsay; 5,145	
Cowdenbeath	**David Barratt**; **11,994**	Fiona Sword; 6,307	Darren Watt; 2,201		James Calder; 1,547	Mark Davies; 4,708	Laurie Moffat (AtLS/Sovereignty, 304)
Cumbernauld and Kilsyth	**Jamie Hepburn**; **13,787**	James McPhilemy; 6,472	Keith Allan; 1,129		William Brian Howieson; 949	Steve Grant; 4,580	Alan McManus (AtLS/Sovereignty, 226)
Cunninghame North	**Kenneth Gibson**; **11,814**	Matthew McGowan; 6,022	Ronnie Stalker; 4,904		Christine Murdoch; 1,592	Mike Mann; 5,404	Ian Gibson (ADF, 411)
Cunninghame South	**Patricia Gibson**; **11,375**	Katy Clark; 7,208	Maurice Corry; 2,222		Emma Farthing-Sykes; 1,442	Matthew McLean; 7,049	
Dumbarton	Sophie Traynor; 10,961	**Jackie Baillie**; **12,747**	Gary Mulvaney; 1,368		Elaine Ford; 1,196	David Smith; 5,040	Andrew Muir (Ind, 355); Lynda Hannah McEwan (TUSC, 356)
Dumfriesshire	Stephen Thompson; 10,262	Linda Dorward; 3,364	**Craig Hoy**; **11,370**		Iain McDonald; 1,660	David Kirkwood; 5,783	Paul Adkins (Common, 200)
Dundee City East	**Stephen Gethins**; **12,969**	Cheryl-Ann Cruickshank; 4,792	Jack Cruickshanks; 1,999		Tanvir Ahmad; 2,086	Mark Simpson; 4,135	Peter Ashby (WPB, 209); Donald McLeod (TUSC, 361)
Dundee City West	**Heather Anderson**; **12,722**	Michael Marra; 6,365	Abigail Brooks; 881		Daniel Coleman; 1,980	Arthur Keith; 3,315 (Note: Stuart Niven was announced as Reform candidate on 19 March 2026, and suspended from Reform on 20 March.)	Jim McFarlane (TUSC, 649)
Dunfermline	**Shirley-Anne Somerville**; **14,206**	Joe Long; 8,769	Thomas Heald; 2,209		Lauren Buchanan-Quigley; 3,849	Otto Inglis; 5,093	
East Kilbride	**Collette Stevenson**; **14,339**	Joe Fagan; 9,395	Brian Whittle; 2,251		Leigh Butler; 1,424	Tim Kelly; 5,683	Kristofer Keane (Ind, 716)
East Lothian Coast and Lammermuirs	**Paul McLennan**; **11,677**	Martin Whitfield; 11,259	Miles Briggs; 4,719		Tim McKay; 2,802	Nigel Douglas; 4,611	Morgwn Carter Davies (Ind, 597)
Eastwood	**Kirsten Oswald**; **12,722**	Kayleigh Quinn; 8,368	Jackson Carlaw; 11,990		Euan Davidson; 1,748	John Mooney; 3,453	
Edinburgh Central	Angus Robertson; 7,702	James Dalgleish; 8,098	Jo Mowat; 2,262	**Lorna Slater**; **12,680**	Charles Dundas; 2,168	Gary Neill; 1,876	Tam Laird (Libertarian, 56); Craig John Murray (AtLS, 150); Bonnie Prince Bob (Ind, 176); Chris Creighton (Ind, 32); Robert Neil Pownall (Ind, 41)
Edinburgh Eastern, Musselburgh and Tranent	**Kate Campbell**; **14,083**	Katherine Sangster; 9,097	Tim Jones; 1,819		Alan Grant; 2,057	Angela Ross; 4,120	Joe Smith (AtLS, 305)
Edinburgh North Eastern and Leith	**Ben Macpherson** **13,630**	Oliver Thomas; 7,894	Haris Young; 1,297	Kate Nevens; 10,559	Liss Owen; 1,895	David Lees; 2,746	
Edinburgh North Western	Lyn Jardine; 9,943	Irshad Ahmed; 1,879	Rachel Cairns; 1,749		**Alex Cole-Hamilton**; **22,959**	Davie Thomson; 3,342	David Henry (WPB, 268)
Edinburgh Northern	Euan Hyslop; 10,479	Eleanor Ryan-Saha; 3,744	Christopher Cowdy; 1,900	Kayleigh Kinross-O'Neill; 5,289	**Sanne Dijkstra-Downie**; **12,972**	Andrew McLaughlin; 2,867	Abu Meron (SWP, 258)
Edinburgh South Western	**Simita Kumar**; **11,727**	Catriona Munro; 8,438	Sue Webber; 4,636		Andy Williamson; 3,672	Cameron Rose; 3,936	
Edinburgh Southern	Deidre Brock; 12,000	**Daniel Johnson**; **16,963**	Marie-Clair Munro; 3,421		Jane Alliston Pickard; 3,334	Charles Turner; 3,317	Mar Wilkinson (EELP, 524)
Ettrick, Roxburgh and Berwickshire	John Redpath; 8,206	Kaymarie Hughes; 1,577	**Rachael Hamilton**; **13,483**		Ray Georgeson; 2,358	Jamie Langan; 3,569	Terry Howson (AtLS, 165); James Anderson (Ind, 740)
Falkirk East and Linlithgow	**Martyn Day**; **14,465**	Siobhan Paterson; 9,030	Lewis Stein; 2,861		Paul McGarry; 2,501	Amanda Bland; 7,906	Ian Wallace El-Paget (Ind, 759)
Falkirk West	**Gary Bouse** **14,896**	Paul Godzik; 7,859	Neil Benny; 2,297		Lucy Smith; 2,037	Richard Fairley; 8,160	Stuart James McArthur (Ind, 865)
Fife North East	John Beare; 7,876	Elizabeth Carr-Ellis; 818	Edward Sheasby; 936		**Willie Rennie**; **21,350**	William Docherty; 2,524	
Galloway and West Dumfries	Emma Harper; 9,903	Jack McConnel; 2,544	**Finlay Carson**; **11,502**		Tracey Warman; 1,380	Senga Beresford; 4,674	
Glasgow Anniesland	**Colm Merrick**; **13,281**	Eunis Jassemi; 9,162	Sandesh Gulhane; 1,404		James Speirs; 1,688	Sean O'Hagan; 4,839	
Glasgow Baillieston and Shettleston	**David Linden**; **12,075**	Pauline McNeill; 5,885	John Murray; 1,006		Amy Carman; 1,082	Thomas Kerr; 6,972	
Glasgow Cathcart and Pollok	**Zen Ghani**; **14,270**	Anas Sarwar; 9,107	Kyle Park; 1,325		Peter McLaughlin; 1,407	Kim Schmulian; 5,320	Yvonne Ridley (WPGB, 586); Adnan Zafar Rafiq (Scottish Common, 163)
Glasgow Central	**Alison Thewliss**; **15,085**	Vonnie Sandlan; 5,094	Naveed Asghar; 835		Paul Kennedy; 1,262	Paul Bennie; 3,988	
Glasgow Easterhouse and Springburn	**Ivan McKee**; **11,926**	Paul Sweeney; 6,772	Josephine Macleod; 706		Nicholas Moohan; 788	Audrey Dempsey; 5,309	Kenneth Nwosu (Scottish Common, 301)
Glasgow Kelvin and Maryhill	**Bob Doris**; **11,174**	James Adams; 7,531	Danny Bowman; 1,309	Iris Duane; 9,003	Daniel Khan-O'Malley; 1,374	Aimee Alexander; 3,592	Thomas Adkins (Scottish Common, 130)
Glasgow Southside	Kaukab Stewart; **10,947**	Rashid Hussain; 7,300	Ross Hutton; 1,383	**Holly Bruce**; **14,048**	Rachel Park; 1,143	Gordon Millar; 3,019	Kamran Butt (Scottish Common, 512); Abdullah Aroo Waqqar (Ind, 147)
Hamilton, Larkhall and Stonehouse	**Alex Kerr**; **11,825**	Davy Russell; 9,120	Alexandra Herdman; 1,617		Michael Weatherhead; 1,156	John McNamee; 7,193	David Ballantine (ADF, 348)
Inverclyde	**Stuart McMillan**; **14,193**	Francesca Brennan; 8,876	Ted Runciman; 1,351		Jamie Greene; 1,954	Malcolm Offord; 5,649	
Inverness and Nairn	**Emma Roddick**; **11,162**	Shaun Fraser; 1,723	Ruraidh Stewart; 1,372		Neil Alexander; 10,735	Fred Campbell; 3,791	Fergus Ewing (Ind, 7,840); Steve Skerrett (Advance UK, 110)
Kilmarnock and Irvine Valley	**Alan Brown**; **11,919**	Ewan McPhee; 7,458	James Adams; 2,780		Michael Gregori; 1,169	Anne Millar; 5,441	Garry McClay (AtLS, 407)
Kirkcaldy	**David Torrance**; **12,230**	Claire Baker; 7,483	Heather Greig; 1,445		Fraser Graham; 1,607	Julie MacDougall; 5,484	
Mid Fife and Glenrothes	**Jenny Gilruth**; **12,461**	Afifa Khanam; 3,970	Niamh Heald; 1,414		Ed Scotcher; 3,047	Sacha Haworth; 4,827	
Midlothian North	**Colin Beattie**; **11,250**	Caitlin Stott; 8,754	Phil Doggart; 2,032		Jenny Butler; 2,387	Pal Chidambaram; 4,506	
Midlothian South, Tweeddale and Lauderdale	**Calum Kerr**; **14,091**	Daniel Coleman; 4,614	Keith Cockburn; 6,930		Duncan Dunlop; 4,649	Carolyn Grant; 4,199	
Moray	**Laura Mitchell**; **12,646**	David Blair; 2,340	Tim Eagle; 9,963		Morven-May MacCallum; 2,064	Max Bannerman; 5,540	Allan Duffy (AtLS, 210)
Motherwell and Wishaw	**Clare Adamson**; **11,962**	Ayeshah Khan; 6,447	Bob Burgess; 1,638		Jenni Lang; 979	Duncan Macmillan; 5,692	Dominic James Alderson (Ind, 328); Greig Duncan McArthur (AtLS, 298)
Na h-Eileanan an Iar	Alasdair Allan; 4,511	**Donald MacKinnon**; **4,665**	George MacPherson; 594		Jamie Dobson; 812	Malcolm McTaggart; 1,625	Kenneth McKenzie (AtLS/Sovereignty, 159); Duncan MacPherson (Ind, 139)
Orkney Islands	Robert Leslie; 1,661	Mike Macleod; 199	Jamie Halcro Johnston; 358		**Liam McArthur**; **7,221**	John Coupland; 844	
Paisley	**George Adam**; **13,164**	Neil Bibby; 10,136	Satbir Gill; 940		James Kenyon; 1,073	Alec Leishman; 4,620	Mark Turnbull (Freedom Alliance, 212); Sinead Daly (TUSC, 297); William Wallace (Ind, 458)
Perthshire North	**John Swinney**; **16,414**	Angela Bailey; 2,240	Murdo Fraser; 10,171		Claire McLaren; 2,741	Kenneth Morton; 4,620	
Perthshire South and Kinross-shire	**Jim Fairlie**; **14,707**	Luke Thomson; 2,599	Roz McCall; 9,646		Amanda Clark; 4,329	Helen McDade; 5,128	
Renfrewshire North and Cardonald	**Michelle Campbell**; **14,300**	Mike McKirdy; 9,424	Jack Hall; 1,929		Grant Toghill; 1,642	Moira Ramage; 7,083	Jim Halfpenny (TUSC)
Renfrewshire West and Levern Valley	**Tom Arthur**; **13,819**	Paul O'Kane; 10,548	Farooq Choudhry; 2,016		Ross Stalker; 1,610	Jamie McGuire; 5,844	Ken Thomson (ADF, 374)
Rutherglen and Cambuslang	**Clare Haughey**; **14,969**	Monica Lennon; 9,125	Annie Wells; 1,321		Patrick Logue; 1,833	Allan Lyons; 6,168	Chris Sermanni (TUSC, 467)
Shetland Islands	**Hannah Mary Goodlad**; **5,453**	John Erskine; 169	Douglas Barnett; 137	Alex Armitage; 949	Emma Macdonald; 3,936	Vic Currie; 725	Brian Nugent (AtLS/Sovereignty, 65); Peter Tait (Ind, 50)
Skye, Lochaber and Badenoch	Eilidh Munro; 14,273	Isla McCay; 1,751	Helen Crawford; 2,731		**Andrew Baxter**; **15,223**	Jon Whitton; 4,669	Laùra Hänsler (AtLS, 506)
Stirling	**Alyn Smith**; **13,608**	Kainde Manji; 5,124	Stephen Kerr; 6,166		Jill Reilly; 2,324	Rachael Wright; 4,908	Matthew Riley (Ind)
Strathkelvin and Bearsden	Denis Johnston; 13,125	Colette McDiarmid; 4,678	Pam Gosal; 2,122		**Adam Harley**; **15,697**	Faten Hameed; 4,154	
Uddingston and Bellshill	**Steven Bonnar**; **11,966**	Mark Griffin; 8,832	Meghan Gallacher; 1,750		Ben Munnoch; 1,094	George Hobbins; 5,646	

=== Regions ===
==== Votes ====
Seat	SNP	Labour	Conservative	Greens	Lib Dems	Reform UK	Other	Total
Central Scotland and Lothians West	86,809	57,103	19,450	34,415	12,830	58,334	13,814	282,755
Edinburgh and Lothians East	69,655	58,696	29,223	67,877	42,937	33,341	17,855	319,594
Glasgow	68,669	47,795	10,621	58,881	9,826	38,341	15,330	249,463
Highlands and Islands	54,011	14,632	20,334	21,935	47,437	28,276	14,512	201,137
Mid Scotland and Fife	81,018	41,056	37,155	36,286	34,363	45,632	10,508	286,018
North East Scotland	88,084	29,144	62,174	30,028	25,980	59,823	12,616	307,849
South Scotland	86,446	52,314	60,726	31,170	17,999	61,346	12,561	322,562
West Scotland	91,257	68,045	31,867	41,372	24,852	58,332	18,418	334,143

==== Vote percentages ====
Seat	SNP	Labour	Conservative	Greens	Lib Dems	Reform UK	Other	Total
Central Scotland and Lothians West	30.7	20.2	6.9	12.2	4.5	20.6	4.9	282,755
Edinburgh and Lothians East	21.8	18.4	9.1	21.2	13.4	10.4	5.6	319,594
Glasgow	27.5	19.2	4.3	23.6	3.9	15.4	6.1	249,463
Highlands and Islands	26.9	7.3	10.1	10.9	23.6	14.1	7.2	201,137
Mid Scotland and Fife	28.3	14.4	13.0	12.7	12.0	16.0	3.7	286,018
North East Scotland	28.6	9.5	20.2	9.8	8.4	19.4	4.1	307,849
South Scotland	26.0	16.2	18.8	9.7	5.6	19.0	3.9	322,562
West Scotland	27.3	20.4	9.5	12.4	7.4	17.5	5.5	334,143

==== Members ====
bold = elected in list vote
= elected in constituency vote
italics = not initially elected on list vote, but subsequently entered Parliament after the resignation of another list member

Seat	No.	SNP	Labour	Conservative	Greens	Lib Dems	Reform UK	Liberate Scotland	Scottish Family	SSP	Other
Central Scotland and Lothians West											
Central Scotland and Lothians West	1	Pauline Stafford	**Mark Griffin**	**Meghan Gallacher**	**Gillian Mackay**	Paul McGarry	**Graham Simpson**	Greig McArthur	David Richardson	Collette Bradley	Abolish (John Jo Leckie); Advance UK (Mark Tunnicliff); ISP (Julie McAnulty); IGV (James Stewart); Libertarian (Lukasz Furmaniak); UKIP (Neil Wilson, Stephen Hollis, Margaret Garbutt); WPB (Abdul Dean)
Central Scotland and Lothians West	2	Neil Gray	**Jenny Young**	Lewis Stein	Claire Williams	Lucy Smith	**Mandy Lindsay**	Alan McManus	Leo Lanahan	Lewis Clark	Abolish (John Jo Leckie); Advance UK (Mark Tunnicliff); ISP (Julie McAnulty); IGV (James Stewart); Libertarian (Lukasz Furmaniak); UKIP (Neil Wilson, Stephen Hollis, Margaret Garbutt); WPB (Abdul Dean)
Central Scotland and Lothians West	3	Toni Giugliano	Keiron Higgins	Neil Benny	Cameron Glasgow	Caron Lindsay	**Amanda Bland**	David Baird	Norma McLachlan Diffin	Conor Gilbey	Abolish (John Jo Leckie); Advance UK (Mark Tunnicliff); ISP (Julie McAnulty); IGV (James Stewart); Libertarian (Lukasz Furmaniak); UKIP (Neil Wilson, Stephen Hollis, Margaret Garbutt); WPB (Abdul Dean)
Central Scotland and Lothians West	4	Clare Adamson	Siobhan Paterson	Keith Allan	Anne McCrossan	Stephen Harte	Richard Fairley	Graham Fraser	Ailish Lanahan		Abolish (John Jo Leckie); Advance UK (Mark Tunnicliff); ISP (Julie McAnulty); IGV (James Stewart); Libertarian (Lukasz Furmaniak); UKIP (Neil Wilson, Stephen Hollis, Margaret Garbutt); WPB (Abdul Dean)
Central Scotland and Lothians West	5	Callum Cox	James McPhilemy	Andrew Bruce		Brian Howieson	David McLennan	Steve Arnott			Abolish (John Jo Leckie); Advance UK (Mark Tunnicliff); ISP (Julie McAnulty); IGV (James Stewart); Libertarian (Lukasz Furmaniak); UKIP (Neil Wilson, Stephen Hollis, Margaret Garbutt); WPB (Abdul Dean)
Central Scotland and Lothians West	6	Steven Bonnar	Suzanne Macleod	Peter Heggie		Daniel Mancini	Duncan MacMillan				Abolish (John Jo Leckie); Advance UK (Mark Tunnicliff); ISP (Julie McAnulty); IGV (James Stewart); Libertarian (Lukasz Furmaniak); UKIP (Neil Wilson, Stephen Hollis, Margaret Garbutt); WPB (Abdul Dean)
Central Scotland and Lothians West	7	Stacey Devine	Ayeshah Khan	Damian Doran-Timson		Jenni Lang	Steven Grant				Abolish (John Jo Leckie); Advance UK (Mark Tunnicliff); ISP (Julie McAnulty); IGV (James Stewart); Libertarian (Lukasz Furmaniak); UKIP (Neil Wilson, Stephen Hollis, Margaret Garbutt); WPB (Abdul Dean)
Central Scotland and Lothians West	8		Jordan Stockoe	Bob Burgess			Malcolm Jones				Abolish (John Jo Leckie); Advance UK (Mark Tunnicliff); ISP (Julie McAnulty); IGV (James Stewart); Libertarian (Lukasz Furmaniak); UKIP (Neil Wilson, Stephen Hollis, Margaret Garbutt); WPB (Abdul Dean)
Central Scotland and Lothians West	9			Euan Blockley			George Hobbins				Abolish (John Jo Leckie); Advance UK (Mark Tunnicliff); ISP (Julie McAnulty); IGV (James Stewart); Libertarian (Lukasz Furmaniak); UKIP (Neil Wilson, Stephen Hollis, Margaret Garbutt); WPB (Abdul Dean)
Edinburgh and Lothians East											
Edinburgh and Lothians East	1	Tommy Sheppard	**Irshad Ahmed**	**Miles Briggs**	Lorna Slater	Sanne Dijkstra-Downie	**Angela Ross**	Craig Murray	Philip Holden	Colin Fox	Advance UK (Sean Moffat); AWP (Mark Scott, Lee Christopher Williscroft-Ferris, Vivienne Margret Moir, Jane Catherine Smith); Communist (Chris Cullen); EELP (Marc Richard Wilkinson, David Sisson); Equality (David Renton, Laura MacKintosh, Caitlin Dykes-Johnstone); ISP (John Hannah); IGV (Megan Burns); Libertarian (Tam Laird, Gary Finlayson Smith); WPB (David Henry, Abu Meron); Jeremy Balfour (Independent); Bonnie Prince Bob (Independent); Morgwn Carter Davies (Independent); Ash Regan (Independent)
Edinburgh and Lothians East	2	Deidre Brock	**Katherine Sangster**	Sue Webber	**Kate Nevens**	Jane Pickard	Pal Chidambaram	Joe Smith	Neil Deepnarain	Natalie Reid	
Edinburgh and Lothians East	3	Simita Kumar	Daniel Johnson	Marie-Clair Munro	**Q Manivannan**	Charles Dundas	Nigel Douglas	Hugh Kerr	Mairi Lucas	Ally Maxwell	
Edinburgh and Lothians East	4	Angus Robertson	Catriona Munro	Christopher Cowdy	**Kayleigh Kinross-O'Neill**	Lewis Younie	David Lees	Jim Daly	Helen Maceachen		
Edinburgh and Lothians East	5	Paul McLennan	Martin Whitfield	Jo Mowat	Chas Booth	Jenny Butler	Charles Turner	Anna Carro	Peter James Cox		
Edinburgh and Lothians East	6	Colin Beattie	Caitlin Stott	Tim Jones	Adam Al-Khateb	Liss Owen	Andrew McLaughlin				
Edinburgh and Lothians East	7	Kelly Parry	James Dalgleish	Rachel Cairns	Jo Phillips	Alan Grant	Gary Neill				
Edinburgh and Lothians East	8	Lyn Jardine	Eleanor Ryan-Saha	Haris Young	Mridul Wadhwa		David Thomson				
Edinburgh and Lothians East	9		Oliver Thomas		Dan Heap		Cameron Rose				
Edinburgh and Lothians East	10				Astri JS Kvassnes						
Edinburgh and Lothians East	11				Alex Staniforth						
Edinburgh and Lothians East	12				Mariusz Cebulski						
Glasgow											
Glasgow	1	Alison Thewliss	**Anas Sarwar**	Annie Wells	**Patrick Harvie**	Daniel Khan-O'Malley	**Thomas Kerr**	Tommy Sheridan	Andrew John Bradie	Liam McLaughlan	ISP (Paul Steele); IGV (Alisdair McConnachie); Christian (John Cormak); Common (Kamran Butt, Adnan Zafar Rafiq, Thomas Adkins, Kenneth Ifeanyu Nwosu); UKIP (Donald Mackay, Ian Garbutt, Lynda Davis, Laurence Keeley); WPB (Yvonne Ridley, George Galloway, Catherine McKerman, Laura Jones); Craig Houston (Independent); Elspeth Lynn Kerr (Independent)
Glasgow	2	Ivan McKee	**Pauline McNeill**	Sandesh Gulhane	Holly Bruce	Paul Kennedy	**Kim Schmulian**	Dhruva Kumar	John Paul McArthur	Olivia Murphy	ISP (Paul Steele); IGV (Alisdair McConnachie); Christian (John Cormak); Common (Kamran Butt, Adnan Zafar Rafiq, Thomas Adkins, Kenneth Ifeanyu Nwosu); UKIP (Donald Mackay, Ian Garbutt, Lynda Davis, Laurence Keeley); WPB (Yvonne Ridley, George Galloway, Catherine McKerman, Laura Jones); Craig Houston (Independent); Elspeth Lynn Kerr (Independent)
Glasgow	3	Kaukab Stewart	**Paul Sweeney**	Ross Hutton	**Iris Duane**	James Spiers	Audrey Dempsey	Gail Sheridan	Michael James O'Hara	Bill Bonnar	ISP (Paul Steele); IGV (Alisdair McConnachie); Christian (John Cormak); Common (Kamran Butt, Adnan Zafar Rafiq, Thomas Adkins, Kenneth Ifeanyu Nwosu); UKIP (Donald Mackay, Ian Garbutt, Lynda Davis, Laurence Keeley); WPB (Yvonne Ridley, George Galloway, Catherine McKerman, Laura Jones); Craig Houston (Independent); Elspeth Lynn Kerr (Independent)
Glasgow	4	David Linden	Monica Lennon	Kyle Park	Rana Moro Hamed	Rachel Park	Allan Lyons	Hilda McMahon	Agnes Gallagher		ISP (Paul Steele); IGV (Alisdair McConnachie); Christian (John Cormak); Common (Kamran Butt, Adnan Zafar Rafiq, Thomas Adkins, Kenneth Ifeanyu Nwosu); UKIP (Donald Mackay, Ian Garbutt, Lynda Davis, Laurence Keeley); WPB (Yvonne Ridley, George Galloway, Catherine McKerman, Laura Jones); Craig Houston (Independent); Elspeth Lynn Kerr (Independent)
Glasgow	5	Graham Campbell	James Adams	John Murray	Kit Renard	Peter McLaughlin	Paul Bennie				ISP (Paul Steele); IGV (Alisdair McConnachie); Christian (John Cormak); Common (Kamran Butt, Adnan Zafar Rafiq, Thomas Adkins, Kenneth Ifeanyu Nwosu); UKIP (Donald Mackay, Ian Garbutt, Lynda Davis, Laurence Keeley); WPB (Yvonne Ridley, George Galloway, Catherine McKerman, Laura Jones); Craig Houston (Independent); Elspeth Lynn Kerr (Independent)
Glasgow	6	Colm Merrick	Vonnie Sandlan	Josephine MacLeod	Isabele Ruffell	Amy Carman	Aimee Alexander				ISP (Paul Steele); IGV (Alisdair McConnachie); Christian (John Cormak); Common (Kamran Butt, Adnan Zafar Rafiq, Thomas Adkins, Kenneth Ifeanyu Nwosu); UKIP (Donald Mackay, Ian Garbutt, Lynda Davis, Laurence Keeley); WPB (Yvonne Ridley, George Galloway, Catherine McKerman, Laura Jones); Craig Houston (Independent); Elspeth Lynn Kerr (Independent)
Glasgow	7	Declan Blench	Eunis Jassemi	Daniel Bowman		Verity Woolley	Sean O'Hagan				ISP (Paul Steele); IGV (Alisdair McConnachie); Christian (John Cormak); Common (Kamran Butt, Adnan Zafar Rafiq, Thomas Adkins, Kenneth Ifeanyu Nwosu); UKIP (Donald Mackay, Ian Garbutt, Lynda Davis, Laurence Keeley); WPB (Yvonne Ridley, George Galloway, Catherine McKerman, Laura Jones); Craig Houston (Independent); Elspeth Lynn Kerr (Independent)
Glasgow	8	Zen Ghani					Gordon Millar				ISP (Paul Steele); IGV (Alisdair McConnachie); Christian (John Cormak); Common (Kamran Butt, Adnan Zafar Rafiq, Thomas Adkins, Kenneth Ifeanyu Nwosu); UKIP (Donald Mackay, Ian Garbutt, Lynda Davis, Laurence Keeley); WPB (Yvonne Ridley, George Galloway, Catherine McKerman, Laura Jones); Craig Houston (Independent); Elspeth Lynn Kerr (Independent)
Glasgow	9	Annette Christie									ISP (Paul Steele); IGV (Alisdair McConnachie); Christian (John Cormak); Common (Kamran Butt, Adnan Zafar Rafiq, Thomas Adkins, Kenneth Ifeanyu Nwosu); UKIP (Donald Mackay, Ian Garbutt, Lynda Davis, Laurence Keeley); WPB (Yvonne Ridley, George Galloway, Catherine McKerman, Laura Jones); Craig Houston (Independent); Elspeth Lynn Kerr (Independent)
Glasgow	10	Abdul Bostani									ISP (Paul Steele); IGV (Alisdair McConnachie); Christian (John Cormak); Common (Kamran Butt, Adnan Zafar Rafiq, Thomas Adkins, Kenneth Ifeanyu Nwosu); UKIP (Donald Mackay, Ian Garbutt, Lynda Davis, Laurence Keeley); WPB (Yvonne Ridley, George Galloway, Catherine McKerman, Laura Jones); Craig Houston (Independent); Elspeth Lynn Kerr (Independent)
Glasgow	11	Adekemi Giwa									ISP (Paul Steele); IGV (Alisdair McConnachie); Christian (John Cormak); Common (Kamran Butt, Adnan Zafar Rafiq, Thomas Adkins, Kenneth Ifeanyu Nwosu); UKIP (Donald Mackay, Ian Garbutt, Lynda Davis, Laurence Keeley); WPB (Yvonne Ridley, George Galloway, Catherine McKerman, Laura Jones); Craig Houston (Independent); Elspeth Lynn Kerr (Independent)
Glasgow	12	Qasim Hanif									ISP (Paul Steele); IGV (Alisdair McConnachie); Christian (John Cormak); Common (Kamran Butt, Adnan Zafar Rafiq, Thomas Adkins, Kenneth Ifeanyu Nwosu); UKIP (Donald Mackay, Ian Garbutt, Lynda Davis, Laurence Keeley); WPB (Yvonne Ridley, George Galloway, Catherine McKerman, Laura Jones); Craig Houston (Independent); Elspeth Lynn Kerr (Independent)
Highlands and Islands											
Highlands and Islands	1	**Maree Todd**	Isla McCay	**Tim Eagle**	**Ariane Burgess**	**Morven-May MacCallum**	**Vic Currie**	Brian Nugent	Kenny Stone	Willie Hamilton	Advance UK (Matt Sheppard, Steve Skerrett); ISP (Fiona Nelson); IGV (Nicola Siddall); Christian (David MacLeod Boyd); Libertarian (Nathan Lumb); Rural (Alasdair Fletcher, Ruraidh Ormston); WPB (Syed Hussain); Duncan MacPherson (Independent); Mick Rice (Independent)
Highlands and Islands	2	Robert Leslie	Donald MacKinnon	Jamie Halcro Johnston	**Kristopher Leask**	Alan Reid	**Max Bannerman**	Andrew McDonald	Allan Maceachen	Brenda Nicholson	Advance UK (Matt Sheppard, Steve Skerrett); ISP (Fiona Nelson); IGV (Nicola Siddall); Christian (David MacLeod Boyd); Libertarian (Nathan Lumb); Rural (Alasdair Fletcher, Ruraidh Ormston); WPB (Syed Hussain); Duncan MacPherson (Independent); Mick Rice (Independent)
Highlands and Islands	3	Emma Roddick	Eva Kestner	Helen Crawford	Kate Willis	Declan Gallacher	Amanda Hampsey	Kenneth MacKenzie	Rachel Michelle Gibson		Advance UK (Matt Sheppard, Steve Skerrett); ISP (Fiona Nelson); IGV (Nicola Siddall); Christian (David MacLeod Boyd); Libertarian (Nathan Lumb); Rural (Alasdair Fletcher, Ruraidh Ormston); WPB (Syed Hussain); Duncan MacPherson (Independent); Mick Rice (Independent)
Highlands and Islands	4	Hannah Mary Goodlad	John Erskine	Ruairidh Stewart	Draeyk Van der Horn	Angela MacLean	Fred Campbell	Laùra Hänsler	Eva Morrice		Advance UK (Matt Sheppard, Steve Skerrett); ISP (Fiona Nelson); IGV (Nicola Siddall); Christian (David MacLeod Boyd); Libertarian (Nathan Lumb); Rural (Alasdair Fletcher, Ruraidh Ormston); WPB (Syed Hussain); Duncan MacPherson (Independent); Mick Rice (Independent)
Highlands and Islands	5	Eilidh Munro	Mike MacLeod	George Macpherson	Alex Armitage	Denis Rixson	Malcolm McTaggart	Allan Duffy	Harriet Woolmore		Advance UK (Matt Sheppard, Steve Skerrett); ISP (Fiona Nelson); IGV (Nicola Siddall); Christian (David MacLeod Boyd); Libertarian (Nathan Lumb); Rural (Alasdair Fletcher, Ruraidh Ormston); WPB (Syed Hussain); Duncan MacPherson (Independent); Mick Rice (Independent)
Highlands and Islands	6	Jérémie Fernandes	Callum George	Peter Wallace	Anne Thomas	Guy Grieve	Jon Whitton	Flora Badger			Advance UK (Matt Sheppard, Steve Skerrett); ISP (Fiona Nelson); IGV (Nicola Siddall); Christian (David MacLeod Boyd); Libertarian (Nathan Lumb); Rural (Alasdair Fletcher, Ruraidh Ormston); WPB (Syed Hussain); Duncan MacPherson (Independent); Mick Rice (Independent)
Highlands and Islands	7		Shaun Fraser	Donald MacKenzie	Julie Christie	Fiona Bennett	John Coupland				Advance UK (Matt Sheppard, Steve Skerrett); ISP (Fiona Nelson); IGV (Nicola Siddall); Christian (David MacLeod Boyd); Libertarian (Nathan Lumb); Rural (Alasdair Fletcher, Ruraidh Ormston); WPB (Syed Hussain); Duncan MacPherson (Independent); Mick Rice (Independent)
Highlands and Islands	8		David Blair	Douglas Barnett							Advance UK (Matt Sheppard, Steve Skerrett); ISP (Fiona Nelson); IGV (Nicola Siddall); Christian (David MacLeod Boyd); Libertarian (Nathan Lumb); Rural (Alasdair Fletcher, Ruraidh Ormston); WPB (Syed Hussain); Duncan MacPherson (Independent); Mick Rice (Independent)
Mid Scotland and Fife											
Mid Scotland and Fife	1	John Swinney	**Claire Baker**	**Murdo Fraser**	**Mark Ruskell**	Claire McLaren	**Helen McDade**	Eva Comrie	Richard Crewe Lucas	Paolo Caserta	Advance UK (Hilary Newton Wheater, Reece Craig Lauder); ISP (John Snowden Forbes); IGV (Alexandra Rose Hardie); Libertarian (Calum Paul)
Mid Scotland and Fife	2	Shirley-Anne Somerville	**Joe Long**	**Stephen Kerr**	Mags Hall	Sally Patile	**Julie MacDougall**	Laurie Moffat	Daniel Gerard Smith	Jack Reekie	Advance UK (Hilary Newton Wheater, Reece Craig Lauder); ISP (John Snowden Forbes); IGV (Alexandra Rose Hardie); Libertarian (Calum Paul)
Mid Scotland and Fife	3	Fiona Law	Fiona Sword	Roz McCall	Caitlin Ripley	Edward Scotcher	Rachael Wright	Jock Penman	Alan Henry Brown		Advance UK (Hilary Newton Wheater, Reece Craig Lauder); ISP (John Snowden Forbes); IGV (Alexandra Rose Hardie); Libertarian (Calum Paul)
Mid Scotland and Fife	4	Alyn Smith	Kainde Manji	Alexander Stewart	Ryan Blackadder	Amanda Clark	Mark Davies	Donal Hurley	Marc Surtees		Advance UK (Hilary Newton Wheater, Reece Craig Lauder); ISP (John Snowden Forbes); IGV (Alexandra Rose Hardie); Libertarian (Calum Paul)
Mid Scotland and Fife	5	Jim Fairlie	Suzanne Graham	Edward Sheasby	Marie Stadlter	Lauren Buchanan-Quigley	Mike Collier	Frank Armstrong			Advance UK (Hilary Newton Wheater, Reece Craig Lauder); ISP (John Snowden Forbes); IGV (Alexandra Rose Hardie); Libertarian (Calum Paul)
Mid Scotland and Fife	6	David Torrance	Angela Bailey	Thomas Heald	Clare Andrews	Jane Ann Liston	Kenneth Morton				Advance UK (Hilary Newton Wheater, Reece Craig Lauder); ISP (John Snowden Forbes); IGV (Alexandra Rose Hardie); Libertarian (Calum Paul)
Mid Scotland and Fife	7	Susan McGill	Elizabeth Carr-Ellis	Darren Watt	Andrew Adam	Fraser Graham	Otto Inglis				Advance UK (Hilary Newton Wheater, Reece Craig Lauder); ISP (John Snowden Forbes); IGV (Alexandra Rose Hardie); Libertarian (Calum Paul)
Mid Scotland and Fife	8	John Beare	Afifa Khanam	Heather Greig	Paul Vallot						Advance UK (Hilary Newton Wheater, Reece Craig Lauder); ISP (John Snowden Forbes); IGV (Alexandra Rose Hardie); Libertarian (Calum Paul)
Mid Scotland and Fife	9	David Mitchell	Luke Thomson	Niamh Heald							Advance UK (Hilary Newton Wheater, Reece Craig Lauder); ISP (John Snowden Forbes); IGV (Alexandra Rose Hardie); Libertarian (Calum Paul)
North East Scotland											
North East Scotland	1	Stephen Flynn	**Michael Marra**	**Liam Kerr**	**Maggie Chapman**	**Yi-pei Chou Turvey**	**Duncan Massey**	Stephen Bowie	Euan Morrice	Ross Kenny	Advance UK (Sarah Hashim); ISP (Allan Angus Petrie); IGV (Richard Tallach); WPB (Peter Richard Ashby, Tariq Imtiaz); Marie Boulton (Independent); Iris Leask (Independent)
North East Scotland	2	Gillian Martin	Heather Doran	**Douglas Lumsden**	Esme Houston	Michael Turvey	**Mark Simpson**	Konrad Rekas	Susan Ettle	Brian Stewart	Advance UK (Sarah Hashim); ISP (Allan Angus Petrie); IGV (Richard Tallach); WPB (Peter Richard Ashby, Tariq Imtiaz); Marie Boulton (Independent); Iris Leask (Independent)
North East Scotland	3	Fatima Joji	Lynn Thomson	Alexander Burnett	William Linegar	Tanvir Ahmed	Claudia Leith	Brett Morrison	Dave Bestwick		Advance UK (Sarah Hashim); ISP (Allan Angus Petrie); IGV (Richard Tallach); WPB (Peter Richard Ashby, Tariq Imtiaz); Marie Boulton (Independent); Iris Leask (Independent)
North East Scotland	4	Christian Allard	Cheryl-Ann Cruickshank	James Adams	Sylvia Hardie	Jeff Goodhall	Jo Hart	Ronald Hardie	Joana Moore		Advance UK (Sarah Hashim); ISP (Allan Angus Petrie); IGV (Richard Tallach); WPB (Peter Richard Ashby, Tariq Imtiaz); Marie Boulton (Independent); Iris Leask (Independent)
North East Scotland	5	Dawn Black	Simon Watson	Stewart Whyte	Charlotte Horne	Mel Sullivan	Conrad Ritchie	Mark David Mair			Advance UK (Sarah Hashim); ISP (Allan Angus Petrie); IGV (Richard Tallach); WPB (Peter Richard Ashby, Tariq Imtiaz); Marie Boulton (Independent); Iris Leask (Independent)
North East Scotland	6	Miranda Radley	Kate Blake	Hannah Powell	Remi Salvan	Martyn Knights	John Crawley				Advance UK (Sarah Hashim); ISP (Allan Angus Petrie); IGV (Richard Tallach); WPB (Peter Richard Ashby, Tariq Imtiaz); Marie Boulton (Independent); Iris Leask (Independent)
North East Scotland	7	Michael Hutchison	Matthew Lee	Tracey Smith	Fahd Asif	David Evans	Laurie Carnie				Advance UK (Sarah Hashim); ISP (Allan Angus Petrie); IGV (Richard Tallach); WPB (Peter Richard Ashby, Tariq Imtiaz); Marie Boulton (Independent); Iris Leask (Independent)
North East Scotland	8		Janine Langler	Jack Cruickshanks	Gordon Miller		Arthur Keith				Advance UK (Sarah Hashim); ISP (Allan Angus Petrie); IGV (Richard Tallach); WPB (Peter Richard Ashby, Tariq Imtiaz); Marie Boulton (Independent); Iris Leask (Independent)
North East Scotland	9		Brooke Ritchie	Abi Brooks			William Reid				Advance UK (Sarah Hashim); ISP (Allan Angus Petrie); IGV (Richard Tallach); WPB (Peter Richard Ashby, Tariq Imtiaz); Marie Boulton (Independent); Iris Leask (Independent)
South Scotland											
South Scotland	1	Màiri McAllan	**Carol Mochan**	Rachael Hamilton	**Laura Moodie**	**Duncan Dunlop**	**Jamie Langan**	Terry Howson	Gareth Kirk	Mark Sands	IGV (Maxwell Dunbar); ADF (David Ballantine, Glen Maney); Common (Paul Adkins, Muhammad Tufail); Heritage (David Griffiths, Gisele Skinner, Elspeth Griffiths, Charles McEwan); Libertarian (Daniel Fraser); UKIP (Janice Mackay, Laurie Steele, Robert Bilcliff, Gail Bilcliff, Colin Sullivan); Sean Davis (Independent); Denise Sommerville (Independent)
South Scotland	2	Alan Brown	**Joe Fagan**	Craig Hoy	Ann McGuinness	Roy Georgeson	**David Kirkwood**	Garry McClay	Hamish Goldie-Scot	Zoe Greenan	IGV (Maxwell Dunbar); ADF (David Ballantine, Glen Maney); Common (Paul Adkins, Muhammad Tufail); Heritage (David Griffiths, Gisele Skinner, Elspeth Griffiths, Charles McEwan); Libertarian (Daniel Fraser); UKIP (Janice Mackay, Laurie Steele, Robert Bilcliff, Gail Bilcliff, Colin Sullivan); Sean Davis (Independent); Denise Sommerville (Independent)
South Scotland	3	Emma Harper	Linda Dorward	Finlay Carson	Dominic Ashmole	Aisha Mir	**Senga Beresford**	Yvonne Lazenbury	Laura Shell	Alex Creel	IGV (Maxwell Dunbar); ADF (David Ballantine, Glen Maney); Common (Paul Adkins, Muhammad Tufail); Heritage (David Griffiths, Gisele Skinner, Elspeth Griffiths, Charles McEwan); Libertarian (Daniel Fraser); UKIP (Janice Mackay, Laurie Steele, Robert Bilcliff, Gail Bilcliff, Colin Sullivan); Sean Davis (Independent); Denise Sommerville (Independent)
South Scotland	4	Siobhian Brown	Ewan MacPhee	Sharon Dowey	Neil MacKinnon	Richard Brodie	Tim Kelly	Maureen Johnstone	Josh‑Lee Witherspoon		IGV (Maxwell Dunbar); ADF (David Ballantine, Glen Maney); Common (Paul Adkins, Muhammad Tufail); Heritage (David Griffiths, Gisele Skinner, Elspeth Griffiths, Charles McEwan); Libertarian (Daniel Fraser); UKIP (Janice Mackay, Laurie Steele, Robert Bilcliff, Gail Bilcliff, Colin Sullivan); Sean Davis (Independent); Denise Sommerville (Independent)
South Scotland	5	Katie Hagmann	Lynsey Hamilton	Brian Whittle	Barbara Harvie	Charlotte Olcay	Carolyn Grant	Marjorie Thomson			IGV (Maxwell Dunbar); ADF (David Ballantine, Glen Maney); Common (Paul Adkins, Muhammad Tufail); Heritage (David Griffiths, Gisele Skinner, Elspeth Griffiths, Charles McEwan); Libertarian (Daniel Fraser); UKIP (Janice Mackay, Laurie Steele, Robert Bilcliff, Gail Bilcliff, Colin Sullivan); Sean Davis (Independent); Denise Sommerville (Independent)
South Scotland	6	John Redpath	Daniel Coleman	Keith Cockburn	Cameron Garrett	Michael Gregori	Daniel Clarke				IGV (Maxwell Dunbar); ADF (David Ballantine, Glen Maney); Common (Paul Adkins, Muhammad Tufail); Heritage (David Griffiths, Gisele Skinner, Elspeth Griffiths, Charles McEwan); Libertarian (Daniel Fraser); UKIP (Janice Mackay, Laurie Steele, Robert Bilcliff, Gail Bilcliff, Colin Sullivan); Sean Davis (Independent); Denise Sommerville (Independent)
South Scotland	7	Collette Stevenson	Kaymarie Hughes	Julie Pirone	Tim Clancey	Tracey Warman	John Mcnamee				IGV (Maxwell Dunbar); ADF (David Ballantine, Glen Maney); Common (Paul Adkins, Muhammad Tufail); Heritage (David Griffiths, Gisele Skinner, Elspeth Griffiths, Charles McEwan); Libertarian (Daniel Fraser); UKIP (Janice Mackay, Laurie Steele, Robert Bilcliff, Gail Bilcliff, Colin Sullivan); Sean Davis (Independent); Denise Sommerville (Independent)
South Scotland	8	Stephen Thompson	Davy Russell	James Adams	Tom Kerr		Andrew Russell				IGV (Maxwell Dunbar); ADF (David Ballantine, Glen Maney); Common (Paul Adkins, Muhammad Tufail); Heritage (David Griffiths, Gisele Skinner, Elspeth Griffiths, Charles McEwan); Libertarian (Daniel Fraser); UKIP (Janice Mackay, Laurie Steele, Robert Bilcliff, Gail Bilcliff, Colin Sullivan); Sean Davis (Independent); Denise Sommerville (Independent)
South Scotland	9	Alex Kerr	Brian McGinley	Tracey Clark	Korin Vallance		Andrew Scott				IGV (Maxwell Dunbar); ADF (David Ballantine, Glen Maney); Common (Paul Adkins, Muhammad Tufail); Heritage (David Griffiths, Gisele Skinner, Elspeth Griffiths, Charles McEwan); Libertarian (Daniel Fraser); UKIP (Janice Mackay, Laurie Steele, Robert Bilcliff, Gail Bilcliff, Colin Sullivan); Sean Davis (Independent); Denise Sommerville (Independent)
South Scotland	10	Allan Dorans	Jack McConnel				Anne Millar				IGV (Maxwell Dunbar); ADF (David Ballantine, Glen Maney); Common (Paul Adkins, Muhammad Tufail); Heritage (David Griffiths, Gisele Skinner, Elspeth Griffiths, Charles McEwan); Libertarian (Daniel Fraser); UKIP (Janice Mackay, Laurie Steele, Robert Bilcliff, Gail Bilcliff, Colin Sullivan); Sean Davis (Independent); Denise Sommerville (Independent)
South Scotland	11	Kirsty Campbell									IGV (Maxwell Dunbar); ADF (David Ballantine, Glen Maney); Common (Paul Adkins, Muhammad Tufail); Heritage (David Griffiths, Gisele Skinner, Elspeth Griffiths, Charles McEwan); Libertarian (Daniel Fraser); UKIP (Janice Mackay, Laurie Steele, Robert Bilcliff, Gail Bilcliff, Colin Sullivan); Sean Davis (Independent); Denise Sommerville (Independent)
South Scotland	12	Ross Clark									IGV (Maxwell Dunbar); ADF (David Ballantine, Glen Maney); Common (Paul Adkins, Muhammad Tufail); Heritage (David Griffiths, Gisele Skinner, Elspeth Griffiths, Charles McEwan); Libertarian (Daniel Fraser); UKIP (Janice Mackay, Laurie Steele, Robert Bilcliff, Gail Bilcliff, Colin Sullivan); Sean Davis (Independent); Denise Sommerville (Independent)
West Scotland											
West Scotland	1	Stuart McMillan	Jackie Baillie	**Russell Findlay**	**Ross Greer**	Adam Harley	**Malcolm Offord**	Gordon Ross	Liam McKechnie	Veronica Edgely	ADF (Ken Thomson, Ian Gibson); ISP (Colette Walker); IGV (Ian Inkster); Common (Claire Gallagher); Libertarian (Alan William Findlay, Cameron Alexander Milne); SLP (James McDaid, Louise McDaid, Bobby Cochrane, Bryan McLardy, David Jacobsen); Liberal (Allan Steele, Andrew MacGregor); UKIP (Ben Walker, Mike Pursglove, Gillian Ammoun); Paul Mack (Independent); Paddy McCarthy (Independent); William Wallace (Independent)
West Scotland	2	Kirsten Oswald	**Neil Bibby**	Jackson Carlaw	**Cara McKee**	Jamie Greene	**David Smith**	Simon McLean	Luke Reid	Jonathan Judge	ADF (Ken Thomson, Ian Gibson); ISP (Colette Walker); IGV (Ian Inkster); Common (Claire Gallagher); Libertarian (Alan William Findlay, Cameron Alexander Milne); SLP (James McDaid, Louise McDaid, Bobby Cochrane, Bryan McLardy, David Jacobsen); Liberal (Allan Steele, Andrew MacGregor); UKIP (Ben Walker, Mike Pursglove, Gillian Ammoun); Paul Mack (Independent); Paddy McCarthy (Independent); William Wallace (Independent)
West Scotland	3	Michelle Campbell	**Katy Clark**	Pam Gosal	Karen Sharkey	Christine Murdoch	Moira Ramage	Ken McNeil	Matt Lynch	Colin Edgely	ADF (Ken Thomson, Ian Gibson); ISP (Colette Walker); IGV (Ian Inkster); Common (Claire Gallagher); Libertarian (Alan William Findlay, Cameron Alexander Milne); SLP (James McDaid, Louise McDaid, Bobby Cochrane, Bryan McLardy, David Jacobsen); Liberal (Allan Steele, Andrew MacGregor); UKIP (Ben Walker, Mike Pursglove, Gillian Ammoun); Paul Mack (Independent); Paddy McCarthy (Independent); William Wallace (Independent)
West Scotland	4	Patricia Gibson	Paul O'Kane	Alix Mathieson	Paula Baker	Grant Toghill	Mike Mann	Ian Vallance	Paul Gallacher		ADF (Ken Thomson, Ian Gibson); ISP (Colette Walker); IGV (Ian Inkster); Common (Claire Gallagher); Libertarian (Alan William Findlay, Cameron Alexander Milne); SLP (James McDaid, Louise McDaid, Bobby Cochrane, Bryan McLardy, David Jacobsen); Liberal (Allan Steele, Andrew MacGregor); UKIP (Ben Walker, Mike Pursglove, Gillian Ammoun); Paul Mack (Independent); Paddy McCarthy (Independent); William Wallace (Independent)
West Scotland	5	Kenneth Gibson	Francesca Brennan	Gary Mulvaney	Ross Collins	Emma Farthing-Sykes	Matthew McLean	Eammon Gallagher			ADF (Ken Thomson, Ian Gibson); ISP (Colette Walker); IGV (Ian Inkster); Common (Claire Gallagher); Libertarian (Alan William Findlay, Cameron Alexander Milne); SLP (James McDaid, Louise McDaid, Bobby Cochrane, Bryan McLardy, David Jacobsen); Liberal (Allan Steele, Andrew MacGregor); UKIP (Ben Walker, Mike Pursglove, Gillian Ammoun); Paul Mack (Independent); Paddy McCarthy (Independent); William Wallace (Independent)
West Scotland	6	Tom Arthur	Kayleigh Quinn	Maurice Corry		Ross Stalker	Andrew White				ADF (Ken Thomson, Ian Gibson); ISP (Colette Walker); IGV (Ian Inkster); Common (Claire Gallagher); Libertarian (Alan William Findlay, Cameron Alexander Milne); SLP (James McDaid, Louise McDaid, Bobby Cochrane, Bryan McLardy, David Jacobsen); Liberal (Allan Steele, Andrew MacGregor); UKIP (Ben Walker, Mike Pursglove, Gillian Ammoun); Paul Mack (Independent); Paddy McCarthy (Independent); William Wallace (Independent)
West Scotland	7	Sophie Traynor	Mike McKirdy	Jack Hall		Elaine Ford					ADF (Ken Thomson, Ian Gibson); ISP (Colette Walker); IGV (Ian Inkster); Common (Claire Gallagher); Libertarian (Alan William Findlay, Cameron Alexander Milne); SLP (James McDaid, Louise McDaid, Bobby Cochrane, Bryan McLardy, David Jacobsen); Liberal (Allan Steele, Andrew MacGregor); UKIP (Ben Walker, Mike Pursglove, Gillian Ammoun); Paul Mack (Independent); Paddy McCarthy (Independent); William Wallace (Independent)
West Scotland	8	Denis Johnston	Colette McDiarmid	Ronnie Stalker							ADF (Ken Thomson, Ian Gibson); ISP (Colette Walker); IGV (Ian Inkster); Common (Claire Gallagher); Libertarian (Alan William Findlay, Cameron Alexander Milne); SLP (James McDaid, Louise McDaid, Bobby Cochrane, Bryan McLardy, David Jacobsen); Liberal (Allan Steele, Andrew MacGregor); UKIP (Ben Walker, Mike Pursglove, Gillian Ammoun); Paul Mack (Independent); Paddy McCarthy (Independent); William Wallace (Independent)
West Scotland	9	Michael Gibbons	Matthew McGowan	Farooq Choudhry							ADF (Ken Thomson, Ian Gibson); ISP (Colette Walker); IGV (Ian Inkster); Common (Claire Gallagher); Libertarian (Alan William Findlay, Cameron Alexander Milne); SLP (James McDaid, Louise McDaid, Bobby Cochrane, Bryan McLardy, David Jacobsen); Liberal (Allan Steele, Andrew MacGregor); UKIP (Ben Walker, Mike Pursglove, Gillian Ammoun); Paul Mack (Independent); Paddy McCarthy (Independent); William Wallace (Independent)
West Scotland	10	Andrew Steel		Ted Runciman							ADF (Ken Thomson, Ian Gibson); ISP (Colette Walker); IGV (Ian Inkster); Common (Claire Gallagher); Libertarian (Alan William Findlay, Cameron Alexander Milne); SLP (James McDaid, Louise McDaid, Bobby Cochrane, Bryan McLardy, David Jacobsen); Liberal (Allan Steele, Andrew MacGregor); UKIP (Ben Walker, Mike Pursglove, Gillian Ammoun); Paul Mack (Independent); Paddy McCarthy (Independent); William Wallace (Independent)

== Aftermath and analysis ==
The SNP won a fifth successive Scottish Parliament election. Labour and Reform tied for second place. The Scottish Greens elected their first constituency MSPs and also elected the first transgender members to the Scottish Parliament. A number of high-profile MSPs were unseated including Angus Robertson, Jackson Carlaw, Kaukab Stewart, Fergus Ewing, Ash Regan and Monica Lennon. Following the election, Jackie Baillie and John Swinney were the only remaining MSPs who had served in the parliament continuously since the 1999 election. Kenny Gibson and Pauline McNeill, who were also first elected in 1999, had each been absent for one parliamentary session.

John Swinney had the opportunity to form a new government, and was subsequently re-elected as First Minister by the Scottish Parliament on 20 May 2026. He named a new cabinet, the second Swinney government, continuing to lead a minority government.

Reform UK's leader Malcolm Offord lost out in Inverclyde but was elected on the party list. John Swinney ruled out holding any talks with the party.

Despite the poor result for his party, Anas Sarwar told reporters that he would remain the leader of Scottish Labour. However, he resigned two months later to take up a ministerial role in the Burnham ministry.

On 12 June 2026, the French government agency Viginum reported that an Israeli private influence firm was involved in election interference, including targeting John Swinney.

=== Election of the Presiding Officer and Deputy Presiding Officers ===
==== Presiding Officer ====
Candidate	First round	Second round	Third round
Kenneth Gibson	46 / 129	48 / 129	74 / 129
Clare Haughey	42 / 129	44 / 129	54 / 129
Liam McArthur	34 / 129	36 / 129	Eliminated
Stuart McMillan	6 / 129	Eliminated	
Abstentions	1 / 129	1 / 129	1 / 129
Source: BBC

==== Deputy Presiding Officers ====
Candidate	First round	Second round	Third round	Fourth round	Fifth round
Clare Adamson	46 / 129	58 / 129	68 / 129	Elected	
Katy Clark	6 / 129	Eliminated		44 / 129	68 / 129
Miles Briggs	38 / 129	37 / 129	41 / 129	50 / 129	55 / 129
Claire Baker	16 / 129	22 / 129	18 / 129	30 / 129	Eliminated
Stuart McMillan	17 / 129	10 / 129	Eliminated	Disqualified (Note: Parliamentary standing orders forbid the second Deputy Presiding Officer from being a member of the same party as both the Presiding Officer and the first Deputy, making McMillan ineligible to stand following the elections of Adamson and Gibson.)	
Abstentions	6 / 129	2 / 129	2 / 129	5 / 129	6 / 129
Source: BBC

=== Election of the First Minister ===
Candidate	First round	Second round	Third round
John Swinney	57 / 129	57 / 129	56 / 129
Anas Sarwar	17 / 129	17 / 129	17 / 129
Malcolm Offord	17 / 129	17 / 129	17 / 129
Gillian Mackay	15 / 129	13 / 129	15 / 129
Russell Findlay	12 / 129	11 / 129	Eliminated
Alex Cole-Hamilton	10 / 129	Eliminated	
Abstentions	1 / 129	14 / 129	24 / 129
Source: BBC

=== Voter demographics ===
==== YouGov ====
Following the election, YouGov published a demographic breakdown of the election results.

Breakdown of constituency vote in Scotland into affiliates (%) by demographic
Category	SNP	Lab	Ref	Con	LD	Grn	Others	Margin
All	39	19	15	11	11	2	2	20
Gender
Female	39	17	12	13	14	2	2	22
Male	40	20	17	10	9	2	2	20
Age
16–29	45	21	9	6	11	7	1	24
30–39	48	16	12	7	9	5	3	32
40–49	43	19	11	9	13	1	4	24
50–59	37	18	20	10	11	1	2	17
60–69	35	20	19	14	9	0	2	15
70+	30	19	16	19	14	0	1	11
Women by age
16–34	49	15	4	9	16	5	2	33
35–49	46	17	11	11	11	2	2	29
50–64	36	15	17	13	14	2	3	19
65+	29	21	14	19	14	0	3	8
Men by age
16–34	43	24	14	4	5	9	1	19
35–49	43	20	13	7	12	1	4	23
50–64	41	19	22	10	6	0	2	19
65+	32	20	21	16	10	0	1	11
Socio-economic Classification
Higher	37	24	10	13	12	2	2	13
Intermediate	36	16	18	13	14	1	2	18
Routine	42	15	20	11	8	1	2	22
Highest educational level
Low	38	18	22	9	10	0	3	16
Medium	38	18	15	13	11	2	2	20
High	42	21	9	11	12	2	2	21
Work status
Working	43	18	15	10	10	2	2	25
Student	43	23	6	5	13	7	3	20
Retired	31	21	17	17	13	0	2	10
Not working	47	15	14	8	11	2	2	32
Household earnings
Under £25,000	39	16	16	12	13	2	2	23
£25,000–39,999	45	17	15	10	8	1	3	28
£40,000–69,999	39	22	15	9	9	3	2	17
£70,000+	36	21	12	14	15	1	1	15
Household tenure
Own outright	32	21	17	16	11	1	2	11
Mortgage	42	18	12	11	12	2	3	24
Private rent	39	17	10	6	15	11	2	22
Social rent	46	15	21	5	10	0	4	25
Family or friends	49	17	13	10	9	1	1	32
By affiliation of constituency vote in 2021 Scottish Parliament election
Conservative	3	14	34	40	7	1	2	6
Labour	10	59	15	7	6	2	2	44
Lib Dem	7	12	10	3	67	0	1	55
SNP	77	6	6	3	5	1	2	71
By affiliation of regional vote in 2021 Scottish Parliament election
Conservative	1	17	34	35	10	0	2	1
Labour	12	57	11	9	9	1	1	45
Lib Dem	7	19	4	7	63	0	1	44
SNP	76	8	7	3	5	0	2	68
Green	64	10	3	1	9	9	4	54
By affiliation of vote in 2024 United Kingdom general election
Conservative	4	10	28	55	3	0	1	27
Labour	19	50	12	8	8	2	1	31
Lib Dem	10	8	5	6	68	3	1	58
SNP	88	2	3	1	2	2	2	85
Reform UK	2	4	80	6	5	0	4	74
Green	64	8	2	0	8	18	0	62
By affiliation of regional vote in 2026 Scottish Parliament election
Conservative	1	13	5	75	6	0	0	62
Labour	4	83	0	5	7	0	0	76
Lib Dem	9	10	1	5	73	2	1	63
SNP	94	2	0	0	3	1	0	91
Green	73	6	0	0	9	11	1	62
Reform UK	1	6	81	6	3	0	1	75
By affiliation of vote in 2014 Scottish independence referendum
Yes	65	9	12	4	6	1	3	53
No	14	29	19	20	16	1	1	9
By affiliation of vote in 2016 EU membership referendum
Remain	45	21	7	11	12	2	2	24
Leave	22	14	34	17	10	0	2	12

Breakdown of regional vote in Scotland into affiliates (%) by demographic
Category	SNP	Ref	Lab	Grn	Con	LD	Others	Margin
All	27	17	16	14	12	9	5	10
Gender
Female	29	14	15	13	12	13	4	14
Male	25	19	17	15	11	7	6	6
Age
16–29	19	9	16	36	6	11	3	17
30–39	33	12	16	19	8	7	5	14
40–49	28	16	16	15	8	12	6	12
50–59	28	21	16	8	10	7	8	7
60–69	29	21	16	6	16	7	5	8
70+	26	17	16	6	20	12	3	6
Women by age
16–34	25	5	13	35	9	9	3	10
35–49	35	12	15	12	10	12	4	20
50–64	31	19	14	7	12	12	5	12
65+	27	16	17	5	19	13	3	8
Men by age
16–34	18	14	19	31	3	10	5	12
35–49	26	17	17	16	7	10	6	9
50–64	30	24	18	8	11	3	7	6
65+	24	21	15	6	21	7	5	3
Socio-economic Classification
Higher	26	12	20	14	15	9	4	6
Intermediate	29	19	13	9	12	12	6	10
Routine	31	22	14	11	11	7	4	9
Highest educational level
Low	31	25	14	6	10	8	5	6
Medium	26	17	15	14	14	9	4	9
High	26	11	18	19	10	10	6	7
Work status
Working	30	17	16	14	9	8	6	13
Student	14	6	15	38	5	14	7	23
Retired	26	19	16	5	20	10	3	6
Not working	30	16	13	20	8	10	3	10
Household earnings
Under £25,000	31	17	14	14	11	9	4	14
£25,000–39,999	33	17	14	14	10	8	4	16
£40,000–69,999	28	16	17	15	11	7	6	11
£70,000+	24	14	19	15	13	11	4	5
Household tenure
Own outright	25	18	17	7	18	9	6	7
Mortgage	29	15	16	14	11	10	5	13
Private rent	21	11	14	29	6	13	6	8
Social rent	38	24	12	9	4	8	5	14
Family or friends	21	15	14	31	9	10	1	10
By affiliation of constituency vote in 2021 Scottish Parliament election
Conservative	2	38	9	0	42	6	3	4
Labour	7	17	50	6	9	5	6	33
Lib Dem	6	11	14	8	10	50	2	36
SNP	56	6	6	18	2	5	6	38
By affiliation of regional vote in 2021 Scottish Parliament election
Conservative	1	40	8	0	41	8	2	1
Labour	8	12	55	5	6	9	4	43
Lib Dem	7	7	18	3	10	50	5	32
SNP	62	8	7	12	3	4	4	50
Green	22	3	8	53	1	4	9	31
By affiliation of vote in 2024 United Kingdom general election
Conservative	3	30	7	0	54	2	3	24
Labour	14	13	42	8	10	9	4	28
Lib Dem	9	8	12	7	9	52	2	40
SNP	65	4	2	19	1	2	7	46
Reform UK	0	90	1	0	3	2	3	87
Green	11	3	5	80	0	0	1	69
By affiliation of constituency vote in 2026 Scottish Parliament election
Conservative	1	9	7	0	76	4	3	67
Labour	3	5	70	5	8	5	3	62
Lib Dem	6	5	10	11	6	60	2	49
SNP	65	0	2	26	0	2	4	39
Reform UK	0	93	0	0	4	1	1	89
By affiliation of vote in 2014 Scottish independence referendum
Yes	47	13	8	15	4	6	7	32
No	11	23	24	5	22	13	3	1
By affiliation of vote in 2016 EU membership referendum
Remain	32	7	18	14	12	11	6	14
Leave	19	40	11	3	16	7	3	21

== See also ==
- 2026 Senedd election
- 2026 United Kingdom local elections
