= Simita Kumar =

Scottish politician

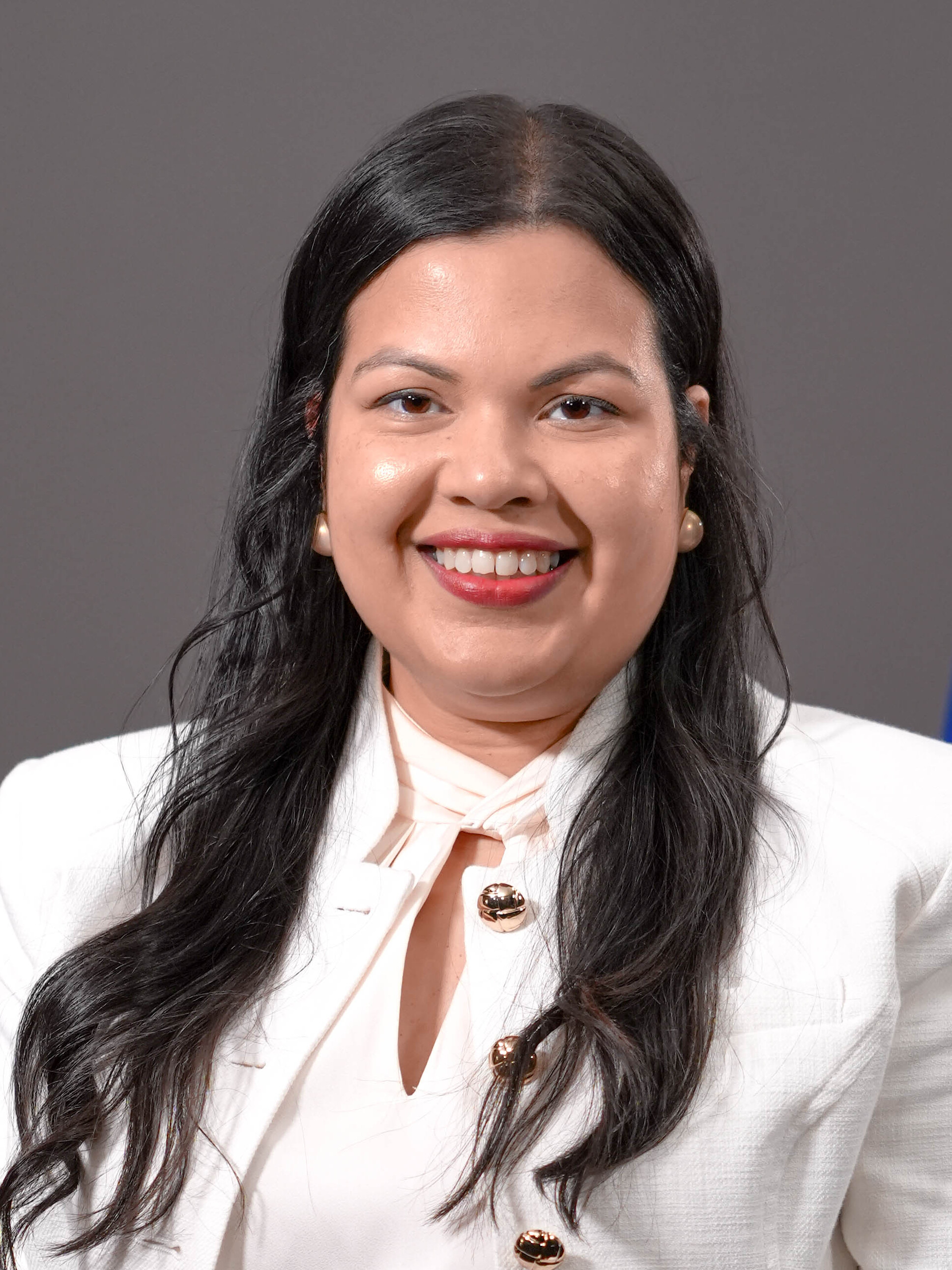
- Official portrait, 2026

Minister for Equalities and International Development
- Incumbent
- Assumed office 21 May 2026
- First Minister: John Swinney
- Preceded by: Kaukab Stewart

Member of the Scottish Parliament for Edinburgh South Western
- Incumbent
- Assumed office 7 May 2026
- Preceded by: Constituency established
- Majority: 3,289 (10.2%)

Member of City of Edinburgh Council
- Incumbent
- Assumed office 5 May 2022
- Constituency: Southside/Newington

Personal details
- Born: September 1987 (age 38) Fiji
- Party: Scottish National Party

Simita Kumar (born September 1987) is a Fiji-born Scottish politician who was elected to the Scottish Parliament in the 2026 election. She represents Edinburgh South Western as a member of the Scottish National Party. She became the Minister for Equalities and International Development in 2026.

== Biography ==
Kumar was born in Fiji to a Indo-Fijian family. She immigrated to the UK when she was 17. In 2022, Simita Kumar was elected to represent Southside/Newington on City of Edinburgh Council. She led the SNP group on the council. She was the first party group leader from an ethnic minority. She stood in Edinburgh South in the 2024 United Kingdom general election. She came in second place behind Ian Murray from the Labour Party.

Kumar was the Scottish National Party candidate for the Edinburgh South Western constituency in the 2026 Scottish Parliament election, and 3rd on the party list in Edinburgh and Lothians East. She was elected constituency MSP, taking 36% of the vote. Catriona Munro took second place for the Labour Party with 26% of the vote. She stood down as leader of Edinburgh council's SNP group and she was replaced by Lesley Macinnes.

in May 2026, she was appointed to the Scottish government as Minister for Equalities and International Development by John Swinney.
