= East Mainland, South Ronaldsay and Burray (ward) =

Electoral ward of Orkney, Scotland

- Orkney Islands
- Boundary of East Mainland, South Ronaldsay and Burray in Orkney from 2007–2022.
- Population: 4,103 (2021)
- Electorate: 2,664 (2022)
- Major settlements: St Margaret's Hope
- Scottish Parliament constituency: Orkney
- Scottish Parliament region: Highlands and Islands
- UK Parliament constituency: Orkney and Shetland

Current ward
- Created: 2007
- Number of councillors: 3
- Councillor: Raymie Peace (Independent)
- Councillor: Gillian Skuse (Independent)
- Councillor: James Moar (Independent)
- Created from: Berstane and Work; Holm and Burray; St Andrew's Deerness and Wideford; South Ronaldsay

East Mainland, South Ronaldsay and Burray is one of the six electoral wards of Orkney Islands Council. Created in 2007, the ward elects three councillors using the single transferable vote electoral system and covers an area with a population of 4,103 people.

Local politics in Orkney is traditionally non-partisan and the ward has only once elected a councillor affiliated to a political party.

== Boundaries ==
The ward was created following the Fourth Statutory Reviews of Electoral Arrangements ahead of the 2007 Scottish local elections. As a result of the Local Governance (Scotland) Act 2004, local elections in Scotland would use the single transferable vote electoral system from 2007 onwards so East Mainland, South Ronaldsay and Burray was formed from an amalgamation of several previous first-past-the-post wards. It contained all of the former Holm and Burray, St Andrew's Deerness and Wideford and South Ronaldsay wards as well as a small area from the former Berstane and Work ward. East Mainland, South Ronaldsay and Burray covers the eastern part of Mainland as well as a number of islands in the south east of the archipelego including South Ronaldsay, Burray, Lamb Holm, Glimps Holm, Swona and Muckle Skerry.

The ward's boundaries were unchanged following the Fifth Statutory Reviews of Electoral Arrangements ahead of the 2017 Scottish local elections.

Following the 2019 Reviews of Electoral Arrangements, an interim review of island areas as a result of the Islands (Scotland) Act 2018, the ward's western boundary was moved east as Kirkwall Airport and neighbouring communities were transferred into Kirkwall East.

== Councillors ==
Election	Councillors		
2007	Andrew Drever	John Foubister	Russ Madge
2012	Andrew Drever	John Foubister	Russ Madge
2017	Andrew Drever	Norman Rae Craigie	Steve Sankey (Greens)
2022	Raymie Peace	Gillian Skuse	James Moar

== Election results ==
=== 2022 election ===
East Mainland, South Ronaldsay and Burray - 3 seats
Party	Candidate	FPv%	Count				
Party	Candidate	FPv%	1	2	3	4	5
Independent	Raymie Peace	47.8	642				
Independent	Gillian Skuse	20.7	278	380			
Green	Eric Page	14.5	195	216	223	252	
Independent	Julie Rickards	8.8	118	165	185		
Independent	James Moar	8.3	111	205	214	284	378
Electorate: 2,664 Valid: 1,344 Spoilt: 7 Quota: 337 Turnout: 50.7%

=== 2017 election ===
East Mainland, South Ronaldsay and Burray – 3 seats
Party	Candidate	FPv%	Count			
Party	Candidate	FPv%	1	2	3	4
Independent	Andrew Drever (incumbent)	35.7	509			
Green	Steve Sankey	19.9	284	301	383	
Independent	Norman Rae Craigie	16.7	238	281	354	362
Independent	John Stanley Groundwater	14.1	201	229		
Independent	Jim Foubister (incumbent)	13.5	192	231	265	269
Electorate: 2,725 Valid: 1,424 Spoilt: 12 Quota: 357 Turnout: 52.7%

=== 2012 election ===
East Mainland, South Ronaldsay and Burray – 3 seats
Party	Candidate	FPv%	Count						
Party	Candidate	FPv%	1	2	3	4	5	6	7
Independent	Russ Madge (incumbent)	40.7	564						
Independent	Andrew Drever (incumbent)	18.8	261	315	331	344	375		
Independent	Jim Foubister (incumbent)	16.3	226	247	253	263	280	289	368
Independent	Gill Smee	11.0	152	209	226	236	257	267	
Independent	Ken Ross	7.1	98	118	123	128			
SNP	Ewan Loudon	3.4	47	56	59				
Independent	Eleanor MacLeod	2.7	37	52					
Electorate: 2,536 Valid: 1,385 Spoilt: 9 Quota: 347 Turnout: 55.0%

=== 2007 election ===
East Mainland, South Ronaldsay and Burray – 3 seats
Party	Candidate	FPv%	Count				
Party	Candidate	FPv%	1	2	3	4	5
Independent	Andrew Drever (Incumbent)	39.0	524				
Independent	Jim Foubister (Incumbent)	29.5	396				
Independent	Russ Madge	12.0	161	189	200	208	249
Independent	George Linnit	10.8	145	186	199	206	246
Independent	Mac Petrie	7.6	102	166	185	186	
Independent	Simon Treasure	1.0	14	17	18		
Valid: 1,342 Quota: 336
