= West Mainland (ward) =

Electoral ward of Orkney, Scotland

- Orkney Islands
- Boundary of West Mainland in Orkney from 2007–2022.
- Population: 4,666 (2021)
- Electorate: 3,663 (2022)
- Major settlements: Dounby
- Scottish Parliament constituency: Orkney
- Scottish Parliament region: Highlands and Islands
- UK Parliament constituency: Orkney and Shetland

Current ward
- Created: 2007
- Number of councillors: 4
- Councillor: Owen Tierney (Independent)
- Councillor: Rachel King (Independent)
- Councillor: Jean Stevenson (Independent)
- Councillor: Duncan Tullock (Independent)
- Created from: Birsay and Dounby; Evie, Rendall, Rousay, Egilsay and Wyre; Firth and Sunnybrae; Harray and Stenness; Orphir, Wells and Flotta; Sandwick and Stromness Landward

West Mainland is one of the six electoral wards of Orkney Islands Council. Created in 2007, the ward elects four councillors using the single transferable vote electoral system and covers an area with a population of 4,66 people.

Local politics in Orkney is traditionally non-partisan and the ward has only elected one councillor affiliated to a political party.

== Boundaries ==
The ward was created following the Fourth Statutory Reviews of Electoral Arrangements ahead of the 2007 Scottish local elections. As a result of the Local Governance (Scotland) Act 2004, local elections in Scotland would use the single transferable vote electoral system from 2007 onwards so West Mainland was formed from an amalgamation of several previous first-past-the-post wards. It contained all of the former Birsay and Dounby ward, the majority of the former Harray and Stenness, Firth and Sunnybrae and Sandwick and Stromness Landward wards and part of the former Evie, Rendall, Rousay, Egilsay and Wyre ward as well as a small area from the former Orphir, Wells and Flotta ward. Mainland West encompasses the northwestern part of Mainland and includes the villages of Dounby, Twatt, Harray, Stenness and Finstown.

The ward's boundaries were unchanged following the Fifth Statutory Reviews of Electoral Arrangements ahead of the 2017 Scottish local elections.

The ward's boundaries were also unchanged following the 2019 Reviews of Electoral Arrangements, an interim review of island areas as a result of the Islands (Scotland) Act 2018.

== Councillors ==
Election	Councillors			
2007	Jimmy Moar	Alistair Gordon	Eoin Scott	Rob Crichton
2012	Jimmy Moar	Alistair Gordon	Harvey Johnston	Owen Tierney
2015 by	Jimmy Moar	Rachael King	Harvey Johnston	Owen Tierney
2017	Duncan Allan Tullock	Rachael King	Harvey Johnston	Owen Tierney
2022	Duncan Allan Tullock	Rachael King	Jean Stevenson	Owen Tierney

== Election results ==
=== 2022 election ===
West Mainland - 4 seats
Party	Candidate	FPv%	Count				
Party	Candidate	FPv%	1	2	3	4	5
Independent	Owen Tierney (incumbent)	30.2	554				
Independent	Rachael King (incumbent)	26.0	477				
Independent	Jean Stevenson	15.%	284	352	401		
Independent	Duncan Tullock (incumbent)	12.9	237	313	338	354	383
Green	Helen Woodsford-Dean	11.8	217	226	242	248	276
Independent	Sean Lewis	3.5	64	71	78	83	
Electorate: 3,663 Valid: 1,833 Spoilt: 18 Quota: 367 Turnout: 50.9%

=== 2017 election ===
West Mainland – 4 seats
Party	Candidate	FPv%	Count					
Party	Candidate	FPv%	1	2	3	4	5	6
Orkney Manifesto Group	Rachael King (incumbent)	30.6	561					
Independent	Harvey Johnston (incumbent)	29.2	536					
Independent	Owen Tierney (incumbent)	20.2	370					
Independent	Duncan Allan Tullock	10.4	191	245	327	328	344	369
Independent	Jo Jones	3.8	70	106	130	131	142	170
Green	Helen Woodsford-Dean	3.6	66	95	104	104	114	
Independent	Sean Michael Lewis	2.1	39	51	59	60		
Electorate: 3,538 Valid: 1,833 Spoilt: 14 Quota: 367 Turnout: 52.2%

=== 2015 by-election ===
West Mainland by-election (18 August 2015) – 1 seat
Party	Candidate	FPv%	Count
Party	Candidate	FPv%	1
Orkney Manifesto Group	Rachael King	51.4	593
Independent	Barbara Foulkes	38.6	281
Green	Fiona Grahame	10.0	115
Valid: 1,154 Quota: 578

=== 2012 election ===
West Mainland – 4 seats
Party	Candidate	FPv%	Count							
Party	Candidate	FPv%	1	2	3	4	5	6	7	8
Independent	Harvey Johnston	23.3	427							
Independent	Alistair Gordon (incumbent)	17.5	322	333	335	353	371			
Independent	Jimmy Moar (incumbent)	15.6	287	303	307	317	319	320	353	470
Independent	Owen Tierney	13.6	249	257	263	277	308	309	358	446
Independent	Eoin F. Scott (incumbent)	13.0	238	246	249	254	276	277	314	
Independent	Victor Muir	7.2	132	136	139	143	150	150		
Independent	Andrew Appleby	4.0	74	77	81	93				
Independent	Carol Granere	4.0	73	75	78					
Independent	David Ward	1.8	33	33						
Electorate: 3,379 Valid: 1,835 Spoilt: 6 Quota: 368 Turnout: 54.5%

=== 2007 election ===
West Mainland – 4 seats
Party	Candidate	FPv%	Count					
Party	Candidate	FPv%	1	2	3	4	5	6
Independent	Jimmy Moar (Incumbent)	30.7	545					
Independent	Alistair Gordon (Incumbent)	22.5	400					
Independent	Eoin Scott	13.6	242	292	303	321	337	369
Independent	Rob Crichton	11.4	203	248	259	268	293	320
Independent	Tom Flett	7.6	135	175	181	189	209	250
Independent	Ian Flett	5.0	88	98	100	116	136	
Independent	Norman Shearer	4.7	83	95	98	104		
Conservative	Mark Jones	3.8	68	72	74			
Independent	Bob Gilmour	0.7	12	13	14			
Valid: 1,776 Quota: 356
