= Kirkwall West and Orphir (ward) =

Electoral ward of Orkney, Scotland

- Orkney Islands
- Boundary of Kirkwall West and Orphir in Orkney from 2007–2022.
- Population: 4,018 (2021)
- Electorate: 3,630 (2022)
- Major settlements: Kirkwall (part of)
- Scottish Parliament constituency: Orkney
- Scottish Parliament region: Highlands and Islands
- UK Parliament constituency: Orkney and Shetland

Current ward
- Created: 2007
- Number of councillors: 4
- Councillor: Leslie Manson (Independent)
- Councillor: Ivan Taylor (Independent)
- Councillor: Sandy Cowie (Independent)
- Councillor: Kristopher Leask (Green)
- Created from: Firth and Sunnybrae; Harray and Stenness; Lynnfield; Orphir, Wells and Flotta; Pickaquoy; Scapa and Kirkwall South West; Shapinsay and Kirkwall Harbour; Warrenfield

Kirkwall West and Orphir is one of the six electoral wards of Orkney Islands Council. Created in 2007, the ward elects four councillors using the single transferable vote electoral system and covers an area with a population of 4,018 people.

Local politics in Orkney is traditionally non-partisan and the ward has only twice elected a councillor affiliated to a political party.

== Boundaries ==
The ward was created following the Fourth Statutory Reviews of Electoral Arrangements ahead of the 2007 Scottish local elections. As a result of the Local Governance (Scotland) Act 2004, local elections in Scotland would use the single transferable vote electoral system from 2007 onwards so Kirkwall West and Orphir was formed from an amalgamation of several previous first-past-the-post wards. It contained all of the former Scapa and Kirkwall South West ward, the majority of the former Pickaquoy and Warrenfield wards and part of the former Firth and Sunnybrae, Lynnfield and Orphir, Wells and Flotta wards as well as a small area from the former Harray and Stenness and Shapinsay and Kirkwall Harbour wards. As its name suggests, Kirkwall West and Orphir covers the western half of the town of Kirkwall on Mainland as well as a rural area to the south and west of the town around the parish of Orphir and the uninhabited Holm of Houton.

The ward's boundaries were unchanged following the Fifth Statutory Reviews of Electoral Arrangements ahead of the 2017 Scottish local elections.

Following the 2019 Reviews of Electoral Arrangements, an interim review of island areas as a result of the Islands (Scotland) Act 2018, the ward's boundary with Kirkwall East was amended by Kirkwall Harbour to make a more identifiable boundary.

== Councillors ==
Election	Councillors			
2007	Jack Moodie	David Tullock	Allan Leslie	Roderick McLeod
2012	Jack Moodie	David Tullock	John Richards	Alan Clouston
2014 by	Leslie Manson	David Tullock	John Richards	Alan Clouston
2017	Leslie Manson	Sandy Cowie	John Richards	Barbara Foulkes
2022	Leslie Manson	Sandy Cowie	Ivan Taylor	Kristopher Leask (Greens)

== Election results ==
=== 2022 election ===
Kirkwall West and Orphir - 4 seats
Party	Candidate	FPv%	Count							
Party	Candidate	FPv%	1	2	3	4	5	6	7	8
Independent	Leslie Manson (incumbent)	20.7	320							
Independent	Ivan Taylor	16.3	252	254	254	284	345			
Independent	Sandy Cowie (incumbent)	16.2	250	252	254	290	357			
Green	Kristopher Leask	13.7	211	211	213	233	258	267	274	347
Independent	Leslie Sinclair	11.3	175	176	184	199	217	232	244	
Independent	Beverly Clubley	10.3	159	159	160					
Independent	Barbara Foulkes (incumbent)	10.0	155	157	161	189				
Independent	Cameron Whittle	1.4	21	21						
Electorate: 3,630 Valid: 1,543 Spoilt: 10 Quota: 309 Turnout: 42.8%

=== 2017 election ===
Kirkwall West and Orphir – 4 seats
Party	Candidate	FPv%	Count						
Party	Candidate	FPv%	1	2	3	4	5	6	7
Independent	Leslie Manson (incumbent)	44.6	646						
Orkney Manifesto Group	John Richards (incumbent)	23.0	333						
Independent	Sandy Cowie	11.1	160	244	255	257	283	283	356
Independent	Barbara Foulkes	10.4	150	256	267	269	290		
Independent	Barbara Leslie	7.5	109	152	158	161	177	177	
Independent	Alastair Macleod	2.7	39	83	88	93			
Independent	Max Thomas	0.7	10	16	17				
Electorate: 3,466 Valid: 1,447 Spoilt: 19 Quota: 290 Turnout: 42.3%

=== 2014 by-election ===
Kirkwall West and Orphir by-election (27 November 2014) – 1 seat
Party	Candidate	FPv%	Count
Party	Candidate	FPv%	1
Independent	Leslie Manson	57.5	647
Independent	Gillian Skuse	25.0	281
Independent	Lorraine McBrearty	12.6	142
Independent	Laurence Leonard	4.9	55
Valid: 1,125 Quota: 563

=== 2012 election ===
Kirkwall West and Orphir – 4 seats
Party	Candidate	FPv%	Count										
Party	Candidate	FPv%	1	2	3	4	5	6	7	8	9	10	11
Independent	Jack Moodie (incumbent)	31.1	476										
Independent	John Richards	18.5	283	318									
Independent	David Tullock (incumbent)	14.1	215	263	266	267	270	273	288	301	321		
Independent	Alan Clouston	13.9	213	232	234	236	243	248	260	272	281	285	368
Independent	David Dawson	10.6	162	186	188	188	192	206	213	219	232	236	
SNP	Lynda Baird	3.3	50	52	53	53	53	54	56				
Independent	Laurence Leonard	2.7	42	49	49	52	52	54	58	64			
Independent	Sandra Shearer	2.2	34	43	44	44	45	50					
Independent	Raymond Smith	2.0	30	37	38	40	43						
Independent	Bryan Leslie	1.0	16	18	19	19							
Independent	Walter Haywood	0.6	9	9	9								
Electorate: 3,289 Valid: 1,530 Spoilt: 13 Quota: 307 Turnout: 46.9%

=== 2007 election ===
Kirkwall West and Orphir – 4 seats
Party	Candidate	FPv%	Count			
Party	Candidate	FPv%	1	2	3	4
Independent	Jack Moodie	38.1	601			
Independent	David Tullock	16.5	260	321		
Independent	Allan Leslie (Incumbent)	15.3	241	304	305	334
Independent	Roderick McLeod (Incumbent)	14.7	232	295	296	317
Independent	Ian MacDonald (Incumbent)	11.3	178	214	214	232
Independent	Alasdair Thom	4.1	64	88	89	
Valid: 1,576 Quota: 315
