= Stromness and South Isles (ward) =

Electoral ward of Orkney, Scotland

- Orkney Islands
- Boundary of Stromness and South Isles in Orkney from 2007–2022.
- Population: 2,658 (2021)
- Electorate: 2,220 (2024)
- Major settlements: Stromness
- Scottish Parliament constituency: Orkney
- Scottish Parliament region: Highlands and Islands
- UK Parliament constituency: Orkney and Shetland

Current ward
- Created: 2007
- Number of councillors: 3
- Councillor: Graham Bevan (Independent)
- Councillor: Lindsay Hall (Independent)
- Councillor: Janette Park (Independent)
- Created from: Sandwick and Stromness Landward; Stromness North; Stromness South, Graemsay and Hoy North; Orphir, Wells and Flotta

Stromness and South Isles is one of the six electoral wards of Orkney Islands Council. Created in 2007, the ward elects three councillors using the single transferable vote electoral system and covers an area with a population of 2,658 people.

Local politics in Orkney is traditionally non-partisan and the ward has never elected a councillor affiliated to a political party.

== Boundaries ==
The ward was created following the Fourth Statutory Reviews of Electoral Arrangements ahead of the 2007 Scottish local elections. As a result of the Local Governance (Scotland) Act 2004, local elections in Scotland would use the single transferable vote electoral system from 2007 onwards so Stromness and South Isles was formed from an amalgamation of several previous first-past-the-post wards. It contained all of the former Stromness North and Stromness South, Graemsay and Hoy North wards as well as the majority of the former Orphir, Wells and Flotta ward and part of the former Sandwick and Stromness Landward ward. Stromness and South Isles covers the southwestern part of Mainland surrounding the town of Stromness as well as a number of islands in the southwest of the archipelago including Hoy, Flotta, Graemsay, Fara, Cava and Switha.

The ward's boundaries were unchanged following the Fifth Statutory Reviews of Electoral Arrangements ahead of the 2017 Scottish local elections.

The ward's boundaries were also unchanged following the 2019 Reviews of Electoral Arrangements, an interim review of island areas as a result of the Islands (Scotland) Act 2018.

== Councillors ==
| Election | Councillors | | |
|---|---|---|---|
| 2007 | James Stockan | John Eccles | Ian Johnstone |
| 2012 | James Stockan | Rob Crichton | Maurice Davidson |
| 2017 | James Stockan | Rob Crichton | Magnus Thomson |
| 2022 | James Stockan | Graham Bevan | Lindsay Hall |
| 2024 by- | Janette Park | Graham Bevan | Lindsay Hall |

== Election results ==
=== 2024 by-election ===
Stromness and South Isles by-election (28 March 2024) - 1 seat
| Party | Candidate | FPv% | Count |
| Party | Candidate | FPv% | 1 |
|---|---|---|---|
| Independent | Janette Park | 85.7 | 757 |
| Independent | Magnus Thomson | 14.2 | 125 |
Electorate: 2,220 Valid: 882 Spoilt: 1 Quota: 442 Turnout: 39.8%

=== 2022 election ===
Stromness and South Isles - 3 seats
| Party | Candidate | FPv% | Count | | | | | |
| Party | Candidate | FPv% | 1 | 2 | 3 | 4 | 5 | 6 |
|---|---|---|---|---|---|---|---|---|
| Independent | James Stockan (incumbent) | 30.7 | 353 | | | | | |
| Independent | Graham Bevan | 24.4 | 281 | 305 | | | | |
| Independent | Lindsay Hall | 15.2 | 175 | 180 | 182 | 205 | 262 | 354 |
| Green | Maia Brodie | 13.7 | 157 | 160 | 162 | 169 | | |
| Independent | Rob Crichton (incumbent) | 10.0 | 115 | 135 | 144 | 174 | 220 | |
| Independent | Magnus Thomson (incumbent) | 6.0 | 69 | 75 | 77 | | | |
Electorate: 2,233 Valid: 1,150 Spoilt: 7 Quota: 288 Turnout: 51.8%

=== 2017 election ===
Stromness and South Isles – 3 seats
| Party | Candidate | Votes | % |
|---|---|---|---|
| Independent | Rob Crichton (incumbent) | Unopposed | |
| Independent | James Stockan (incumbent) | Unopposed | |
| Independent | Magnus Thomson | Unopposed | |
| Registered electors | | | |
| Independent hold | | | |
| Independent hold | | | |
| Independent gain from Independent | | | |

=== 2012 election ===
Stromness and South Isles – 3 seats
| Party | Candidate | FPv% | Count | | | | | |
| Party | Candidate | FPv% | 1 | 2 | 3 | 4 | 5 | 6 |
|---|---|---|---|---|---|---|---|---|
| Independent | James Stockan (incumbent) | 53.7 | 576 | | | | | |
| Independent | Rob Crichton | 11.8 | 126 | 234 | 235 | 250 | 262 | 364 |
| Independent | Maurice Davidson | 11.4 | 122 | 172 | 174 | 189 | 216 | 270 |
| Independent | John Brown | 10.7 | 115 | 178 | 180 | 196 | 213 | |
| Independent | Terry Thomson | 5.7 | 61 | 82 | 84 | 100 | | |
| SNP | Arthur Alexander Robertson | 5.7 | 61 | 79 | 81 | | | |
| UKIP | Delia Mary Hall | 1.0 | 11 | 15 | | | | |
Electorate: 2,210 Valid: 1,072 Spoilt: 10 Quota: 269 Turnout: 48.8%

=== 2007 election ===
Stromness and South Isles – 3 seats
| Party | Candidate | FPv% | Count | | | | | |
| Party | Candidate | FPv% | 1 | 2 | 3 | 4 | 5 | 6 |
|---|---|---|---|---|---|---|---|---|
| Independent | James Stockan (Incumbent) | 41.6 | 539 | | | | | |
| Independent | John Eccles | 17.9 | 232 | 259 | 272 | 278 | 280 | 327 |
| Independent | Ian Johnstone (Incumbent) | 16.6 | 215 | 305 | 312 | 331 | | |
| Independent | John Brown | 9.5 | 123 | 153 | 158 | 167 | 169 | 215 |
| Independent | Fiona Matheson | 8.7 | 113 | 145 | 149 | 157 | 159 | |
| Independent | Maurice Davidson | 3.1 | 40 | 51 | 51 | | | |
| Independent | Terry Thomson | 2.5 | 33 | 38 | | | | |
Valid: 1,294 Quota: 324
