= North Isles (Orkney ward) =

Electoral ward of Orkney, Scotland

- Orkney Islands
- Boundary of North Isles in Orkney from 2007–2022.
- Population: 2,272 (2021)
- Electorate: 1,853 (2022)
- Major settlements: Pierowall; Whitehall
- Scottish Parliament constituency: Orkney
- Scottish Parliament region: Highlands and Islands
- UK Parliament constituency: Orkney and Shetland

Current ward
- Created: 2007
- Number of councillors: 3
- Councillor: Heather Woodbridge (Independent)
- Councillor: Stephen Clackson (Independent)
- Councillor: Mellissa Thomson (Independent)
- Created from: Evie, Rendall, Rousay, Egilsay and Wyre; Papa Westray, Westray and Eday; Sanday, North Ronaldsay and Stronsay; Shapinsay and Kirkwall Harbour

North Isles is one of the six electoral wards of Orkney Islands Council. Created in 2007, the ward elects three councillors using the single transferable vote electoral system and covers an area with a population of 2,272 people.

Local politics in Orkney is traditionally non-partisan and the ward has never elected a councillor affiliated to a political party.

== Boundaries ==
The ward was created following the Fourth Statutory Reviews of Electoral Arrangements ahead of the 2007 Scottish local elections. As a result of the Local Governance (Scotland) Act 2004, local elections in Scotland would use the single transferable vote electoral system from 2007 onwards so North Isles was formed from an amalgamation of several previous first-past-the-post wards. It contained all of the former Papa Westray, Westray and Eday and Sanday, North Ronaldsay and Stronsay wards as well as part of the former Evie, Rendall, Rousay, Egilsay and Wyre and Shapinsay and Kirkwall Harbour wards. North Isles covers all of the islands north of Mainland including Westray, Sanday, Eday, Stronsay, Rousay, Shapinsay, North Ronaldsay, Papa Westray, Wyre, Gairsay and Papa Stronsay.

The ward's boundaries were unchanged following the Fifth Statutory Reviews of Electoral Arrangements ahead of the 2017 Scottish local elections.

The ward's boundaries were also unchanged following the 2019 Reviews of Electoral Arrangements, an interim review of island areas as a result of the Islands (Scotland) Act 2018.

== Councillors ==
Election	Councillors		
2007	Stephen Hagan	Sam Harcus	Graham Sinclair
2012	Stephen Hagan	Stephen Clackson	Graham Sinclair
2017	Kevin Woodbridge	Stephen Clackson	Graham Sinclair
2020 by-election	Heather Woodbridge	Stephen Clackson	Graham Sinclair
2022	Heather Woodbridge	Stephen Clackson	Mellissa Thomson

== Election results ==
=== 2022 election ===
North Isles - 3 seats
Party	Candidate	FPv%	Count	
Party	Candidate	FPv%	1	2
Independent	Heather Woodbridge (Incumbent)	43.1	443	
Independent	Stephen Clackson (incumbent)	24.9	256	314
Independent	Mellissa Thomson	19.8	204	268
Independent	Paul Rendall	7.4	76	113
Independent	Sebastian Hadfield-Hyde	4.9	50	55
Electorate: 1,853 Valid: 1,029 Spoilt: 10 Quota: 258 Turnout: 56.1%

=== 2020 by-election ===
North Isles by-election (1 October 2020) – 1 seat
Party	Candidate	FPv%	Count
Party	Candidate	FPv%	1
Independent	Heather Woodbridge	69.9	638
Labour	Coilla Drake	17.3	158
Independent	Claire Stevens	8.2	75
Independent	Daniel Adams	4.6	42
Electorate: 1,814 Valid: 913 Spoilt: 7 Quota: 457 Turnout: 50.7%

=== 2017 election ===
North Isles – 3 seats
Party	Candidate	FPv%	Count							
Party	Candidate	FPv%	1	2	3	4	5	6	7	8
Independent	Graham Sinclair (incumbent)	27.0	290							
Independent	Kevin Woodbridge	23.8	256	261	274					
Independent	Stephen Clackson (incumbent)	18.3	197	200	207	208	219	231	247	321
Independent	Stuart Roy McIvor	11.0	118	120	124	125	132	143	168	
Independent	Ralph Stevenson	6.5	70	72	77	78	92	121		
Independent	Simon Tarry	6.5	70	72	72	73	78			
Independent	George Arthur Mowat-Brown	3.6	39	39	40	41				
Independent	Billy Muir	3.3	35	36						
Electorate: 1,840 Valid: 1,075 Spoilt: 5 Quota: 269 Turnout: 58.7%

=== 2012 election ===
North Isles – 3 seats
Party	Candidate	FPv%	Count			
Party	Candidate	FPv%	1	2	3	4
Independent	Stephen Hagan (incumbent)	41.0	433			
Independent	Stephen Clackson	29.2	308			
Independent	Gillian Skuse	16.1	170	219	237	
Independent	Graham Sinclair (incumbent)	13.6	144	238	249	375
Electorate: 1,854 Valid: 1,055 Spoilt: 3 Quota: 264 Turnout: 57.5%

=== 2007 election ===
North Isles – 3 seats
Party	Candidate	FPv%	Count					
Party	Candidate	FPv%	1	2	3	4	5	6
Independent	Stephen Hagan (Incumbent)	40.9	463					
Independent	Stephen Clackson	13.6	154	164	181	188	209	211
Independent	Sam Harcus	11.7	133	211	219	264	307	
Independent	Graham Sinclair	10.9	123	148	160	182	207	213
Independent	Bob Trigg	9.3	105	111	116			
Independent	William Muir	6.4	72	102	130	145		
Independent	Leo Martini-Brown	3.6	41	42				
Independent	George Mowat-Brown	1.3	27	31				
Independent	Barbara Jeffreys	1.3	15	18				
Valid: 1,133 Quota: 284
