= 2022 Orkney Islands Council election =

Orkney Islands Council election

- 5 May 2022

21 seats to Orkney Islands Council 11 seats needed for a majority
- Registered: 17,659
- Turnout: 49.7%
| | First party | Second party |
|---|---|---|
| | Ind | Grn |
| Leader | James Stockan | Steve Sankey |
| Party | Independent | Green |
| Leader's seat | Stromness and South Isles | East Mainland, South Ronaldsay and Burray (stood down) |
| Last election | 18 seats, 83.5% | 1 seat, 4.5% |
| Seats before | 18 | 1 |
| Seats won | 19 | 2 |
| Seat change | ▲1 | ▲1 |
| Popular vote | 7,337 | 1,256 |
| Percentage | 85.4% | 14.6% |
| Swing | ▲1.9% | ▲9.9% |
Leader before election
James Stockan
Independent
Leader after election
James Stockan
Independent

Elections to the Orkney Islands Council were held on 5 May 2022 on the same day as the 31 other Scottish local government elections. As with other Scottish council elections, it was held using single transferable vote (STV) – a form of proportional representation – in which multiple candidates are elected in each ward and voters rank candidates in order of preference.

The elections were the first held since the passage of the Islands (Scotland) Act 2018 which allowed wards in Scottish councils containing islands to be reduced to single- and dual-member wards. Changes were made to the boundaries in the Orkney Islands but the six wards created under the Local Governance (Scotland) Act 2004 remained.

As with previous elections in the area, independent councillors retained a large majority of the seats on the council and retained control of the administration. The Greens – who won their first representation on the council in 2017 – increased their number of seats to two.

== Background ==
=== Previous election ===
At the previous election in 2017, independent councillors retained control of the council after taking all but three seats. The Orkney Manifesto Group won their first representation on the council at a full election as they took two seats while the Greens won their first seat in the region.

2017 Orkney Islands Council election result
| Party | Seats | Vote share |
|---|---|---|
| Independents | 18 | 83.2% |
| Orkney Manifesto Group | 2 | 12.1% |
| Green | 1 | 4.7% |

=== Electoral system ===
The election used the six wards created under the Local Governance (Scotland) Act 2004, with 21 councillors being elected. Each ward elected either three or four members, using the single transferable vote (STV) electoral system – a form of proportional representation – in which voters rank candidates in order of preference.

=== Composition ===
There were no official changes to the political composition of the council in the preceding term. However, independent councillor John Ross Scott did announce he had joined the Greens in 2021, which did not change his affiliation on the council. One by-election was held and resulted in an independent hold.

| Party | 2017 result | Dissolution |
|---|---|---|
| Independents | 18 | 18 |
| Orkney Manifesto Group | 2 | 2 |
| Green | 1 | 1 |

=== Retiring councillors ===
| Ward | Party | Retiring councillor |
|---|---|---|
| Kirkwall West and Orphir | Orkney Manifesto Group | John Richards |
| West Mainland | Independent | Harvey Johnston |
| East Mainland, South Ronaldsay and Burray | Independent | Norman Rae Craigie |
| East Mainland, South Ronaldsay and Burray | Independent | Andrew Drever |
| East Mainland, South Ronaldsay and Burray | Green | Steve Sankey |
| North Isles | Independent | Graham Sinclair |

=== Boundary changes ===
Following the passing of the Islands (Scotland) Act 2018, a review of the boundaries was undertaken in North Ayrshire, Argyll and Bute, Highland, Orkney Islands, Shetland Islands and the Western Isles. The Act allowed single- or two-member wards to be created to provide better representation of island communities. As a result, the boundaries of the existing wards were changed but the number of councillors remained the same. North Isles, Stromness and South Isles and West Mainland were unchanged. The boundaries in and around Kirkwall were amended to better reflect local ties. Kirkwall Airport and neighbouring communities were placed in Kirkwall wards instead of East Mainland, South Ronaldsay and Burray while the boundary between Kirkwall East and Kirkwall West and Orphir was amended by the harbour to make a more identifiable boundary.

=== Candidates ===
The total number of candidates fell from 38 in 2017 to 35. The number of independent candidates (30) outstripped any individual party but fell by four from the previous election. Only one political party – the Greens – named candidates in 2022. In total, they contested five of the six wards as they named three more candidates than in 2017. The Orkney Manifesto Group – who named two candidates in 2017 – was voluntarily deregistered with the Electoral Commission prior to the 2022 election. Despite the drop in overall candidate numbers – and unlike the 2017 election in which the Stromness and South Isles ward was uncontested – all six wards were contested.

== Election result ==
2022 Orkney Islands Council election result
| Party | Seats | Gains | Losses | Net gain/loss | Seats % | Votes % | Votes | +/− |
|---|---|---|---|---|---|---|---|---|
| Independent | 19 | 10 | 9 | ▲1 | 90.5 | 85.4 | 7,337 | ▲2.2 |
| Green | 2 | 2 | 1 | ▲1 | 9.5 | 14.6 | 1,256 | ▲9.9 |
| Total | 21 | | | | | | 8,593 | |

Notes:

- Votes are the sum of first preference votes across all council wards. The net gain/loss and percentage changes relate to the result of the previous Scottish local elections on 4 May 2017. This is because STV has an element of proportionality which is not present unless multiple seats are being elected. This may differ from other published sources showing gain/loss relative to seats held at the dissolution of Scotland's councils.

=== Ward summary ===
Results of the 2022 Orkney Islands Council election by ward
| Ward | % | Cllrs | % | Cllrs | Total Cllrs |
| Ward | Ind | | Green | | Total Cllrs |
|---|---|---|---|---|---|
| Kirkwall East | 71.9 | 3 | 28.1 | 1 | 4 |
| Kirkwall West and Orphir | 86.3 | 3 | 13.7 | 1 | 4 |
| Stromness and South Isles | 86.3 | 3 | 13.7 | 0 | 3 |
| West Mainland | 88.2 | 4 | 11.8 | 0 | 4 |
| East Mainland, South Ronaldsay and Burray | 85.5 | 3 | 14.5 | 0 | 3 |
| North Isles | 100.0 | 3 | | | 3 |
| Total | 85.4 | 19 | 14.6 | 2 | 21 |

=== Seats changing hands ===
Below is a list of seats which elected a different party or parties from 2017 in order to highlight the change in political composition of the council from the previous election. The list does not include defeated incumbents who resigned or defected from their party and subsequently failed re-election while the party held the seat.

Seats changing hands
| Seat | 2017 | | 2022 | |
| Seat | Party | Member | Party | Member |
|---|---|---|---|---|
| Kirkwall East | Independent | John Ross Scott | Green | John Ross Scott |
| Kirkwall West and Orphir | Orkney Manifesto Group | John Richards | Green | Kristopher Leask |
| West Mainland | Orkney Manifesto Group | Rachael King | Independent | Rachael King |
| East Mainland, South Ronaldsay and Burray | Green | Steve Sankey | Independent | Gillian Skuse |

Notes

1. Note 1: In 2017, Cllr Scott was elected as an independent candidate but stood for the Greens in 2022.
2. Note 2: In 2017, Cllr King was elected as an Orkney Manifesto Group candidate but stood as an independent in 2022.

== Ward results ==
=== Kirkwall East ===
The Greens gained a seat while independent councillors Steven Heddle, Gwenda Shearer and David Dawson retained the seats they had won at the previous election. Cllr John Ross Scott was elected as an independent candidate in 2017 but stood for the Greens in 2022.

Kirkwall East - 4 seats
| Party | Candidate | FPv% | Count | |
| Party | Candidate | FPv% | 1 | 2 |
|---|---|---|---|---|
| Green | John Ross Scott (incumbent) | 28.1 | 476 | |
| Independent | Steven Heddle (incumbent) | 25.2 | 428 | |
| Independent | Gwenda Shearer (incumbent) | 24.3 | 413 | |
| Independent | David Dawson (incumbent) | 16.8 | 285 | 340 |
| Independent | Graham MacDonald | 5.4 | 92 | 134 |
Electorate: 3,700 Valid: 1,694 Spoilt: 6 Quota: 339 Turnout: 45.9%

=== Kirkwall West and Orphir ===
The Greens and independent candidate Ivan Taylor gained a seat from former independent councillor Barbara Foulkes and the Orkney Manifesto Group while independent candidates Leslie Manson and Sandy Cowie retained the seats they had won at the previous election.

Kirkwall West and Orphir - 4 seats
| Party | Candidate | FPv% | Count | | | | | | | |
| Party | Candidate | FPv% | 1 | 2 | 3 | 4 | 5 | 6 | 7 | 8 |
|---|---|---|---|---|---|---|---|---|---|---|
| Independent | Leslie Manson (incumbent) | 20.7 | 320 | | | | | | | |
| Independent | Ivan Taylor | 16.3 | 252 | 254 | 254 | 284 | 345 | | | |
| Independent | Sandy Cowie (incumbent) | 16.2 | 250 | 252 | 254 | 290 | 357 | | | |
| Green | Kristopher Leask | 13.7 | 211 | 211 | 213 | 233 | 258 | 267 | 274 | 347 |
| Independent | Leslie Sinclair | 11.3 | 175 | 176 | 184 | 199 | 217 | 232 | 244 | |
| Independent | Beverly Clubley | 10.3 | 159 | 159 | 160 | | | | | |
| Independent | Barbara Foulkes (incumbent) | 10.0 | 155 | 157 | 161 | 189 | | | | |
| Independent | Cameron Whittle | 1.4 | 21 | 21 | | | | | | |
Electorate: 3,630 Valid: 1,543 Spoilt: 10 Quota: 309 Turnout: 42.8%

=== Stromness and South Isles ===
Independent councillor James Stockan retained the seat he had won at the previous election while independent candidates Graham Bevan and Lindsay Hall gained a seat from former independent councillors Rob Crichton and Magnus Thomson.

Stromness and South Isles - 3 seats
| Party | Candidate | FPv% | Count | | | | | |
| Party | Candidate | FPv% | 1 | 2 | 3 | 4 | 5 | 6 |
|---|---|---|---|---|---|---|---|---|
| Independent | James Stockan (incumbent) | 30.7 | 353 | | | | | |
| Independent | Graham Bevan | 24.4 | 281 | 305 | | | | |
| Independent | Lindsay Hall | 15.2 | 175 | 180 | 182 | 205 | 262 | 354 |
| Green | Maia Brodie | 13.7 | 157 | 160 | 162 | 169 | | |
| Independent | Rob Crichton (incumbent) | 10.0 | 115 | 135 | 144 | 174 | 220 | |
| Independent | Magnus Thomson (incumbent) | 6.0 | 69 | 75 | 77 | | | |
Electorate: 2,233 Valid: 1,150 Spoilt: 7 Quota: 288 Turnout: 51.8%

=== West Mainland ===
Independent candidates Owen Tierney and Duncan Tullock retained the seats they had won at the previous election while independent candidates Rachael King and Jean Stevenson gained a seat from former independent councillor Harvey Johnston and the Orkney Manifesto Group. In 2017, Cllr King was elected as an Orkney Manifesto Group candidate.

West Mainland - 4 seats
| Party | Candidate | FPv% | Count | | | | |
| Party | Candidate | FPv% | 1 | 2 | 3 | 4 | 5 |
|---|---|---|---|---|---|---|---|
| Independent | Owen Tierney (incumbent) | 30.2 | 554 | | | | |
| Independent | Rachael King (incumbent) | 26.0 | 477 | | | | |
| Independent | Jean Stevenson | 15.% | 284 | 352 | 401 | | |
| Independent | Duncan Tullock (incumbent) | 12.9 | 237 | 313 | 338 | 354 | 383 |
| Green | Helen Woodsford-Dean | 11.8 | 217 | 226 | 242 | 248 | 276 |
| Independent | Sean Lewis | 3.5 | 64 | 71 | 78 | 83 | |
Electorate: 3,663 Valid: 1,833 Spoilt: 18 Quota: 367 Turnout: 50.9%

=== East Mainland, South Ronaldsay and Burray ===
Independent candidates Raymie Peace, Gillian Skuse and James Moar gained a seat from the Greens and former independent councillors Andrew Drever and Norman Rae Craigie.

East Mainland, South Ronaldsay and Burray - 3 seats
| Party | Candidate | FPv% | Count | | | | |
| Party | Candidate | FPv% | 1 | 2 | 3 | 4 | 5 |
|---|---|---|---|---|---|---|---|
| Independent | Raymie Peace | 47.8 | 642 | | | | |
| Independent | Gillian Skuse | 20.7 | 278 | 380 | | | |
| Green | Eric Page | 14.5 | 195 | 216 | 223 | 252 | |
| Independent | Julie Rickards | 8.8 | 118 | 165 | 185 | | |
| Independent | James Moar | 8.3 | 111 | 205 | 214 | 284 | 378 |
Electorate: 2,664 Valid: 1,344 Spoilt: 7 Quota: 337 Turnout: 50.7%

=== North Isles ===
Independent councillor Stephen Clackson retained the seat he had won at the previous election while independent candidates Heather Woodbridge and Mellissa Thomson gained seats from former independent councillors Graham Sinclair and Kevin Woodbridge. Cllr Heather Woodbridge was elected at a by-election in 2020 following the death of her father, Kevin Woodbridge.

North Isles - 3 seats
| Party | Candidate | FPv% | Count | |
| Party | Candidate | FPv% | 1 | 2 |
|---|---|---|---|---|
| Independent | Heather Woodbridge (Incumbent) | 43.1 | 443 | |
| Independent | Stephen Clackson (incumbent) | 24.9 | 256 | 314 |
| Independent | Mellissa Thomson | 19.8 | 204 | 268 |
| Independent | Paul Rendall | 7.4 | 76 | 113 |
| Independent | Sebastian Hadfield-Hyde | 4.9 | 50 | 55 |
Electorate: 1,853 Valid: 1,029 Spoilt: 10 Quota: 258 Turnout: 56.1%

== Aftermath ==
Two Green councillors were elected as the party doubled their representation on the council. Kristopher Leask, Green councillor for Kirkwall West and Orphir, was returned as the youngest person to be elected to the council while the number of women on the council increased from four to six.

Stromness and South Isles councillor James Stockan was re-elected as council leader as independent councillors retained control of the council. Cllr Heather Woodbridge was elected as depute leader and Cllr Graham Bevan was elected as convener - the civic head of the council - for a period of two years.

Cllr Stockan retired in February 2024 and was replaced as council leader by Cllr Woodbridge who, in turn, was replaced as depute leader by Cllr Alexander Cowie.

In May 2024, Cllr Bevan was re-elected as convener until the end of the council term in 2027.

=== Stromness and South Isles by-elections ===
Council leader and Stromness and South Isles councillor James Stockan announced his retirement in January 2024 after 20 years on the council, officially standing down on 5 February 2024. A by-election was held to fill his seat on 28 March 2024 and was won by independent candidate Janette Park.

Stromness and South Isles by-election (28 March 2024) - 1 seat
| Party | Candidate | FPv% | Count |
| Party | Candidate | FPv% | 1 |
|---|---|---|---|
| Independent | Janette Park | 85.7 | 757 |
| Independent | Magnus Thomson | 14.2 | 125 |
Electorate: 2,220 Valid: 882 Spoilt: 1 Quota: 442 Turnout: 39.8%
