= 2022 Scottish local elections =

- 5 May 2022

All 1,226 seats to 32 Scottish councils
- Turnout: 44.8% (▼2.1%)
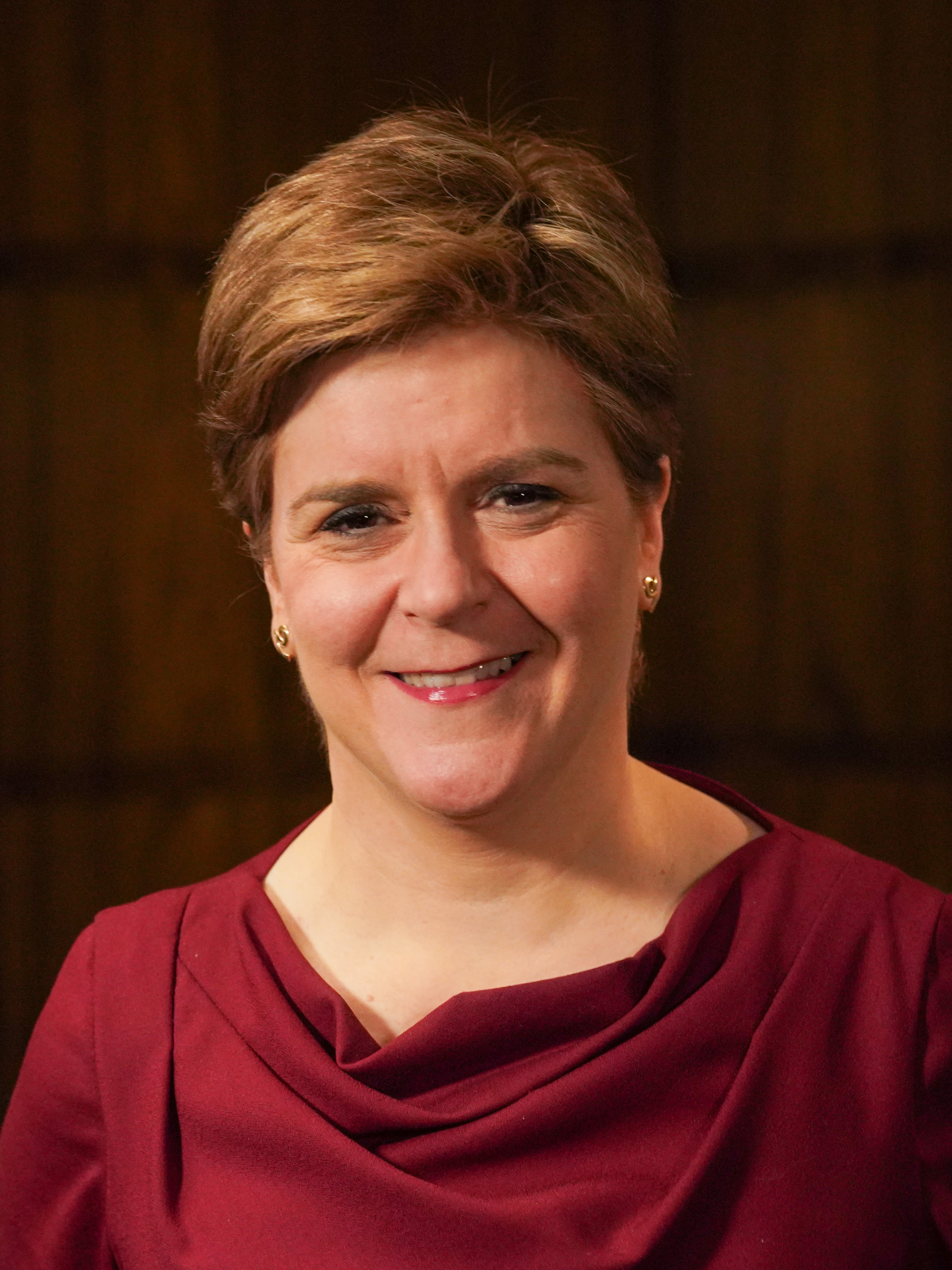

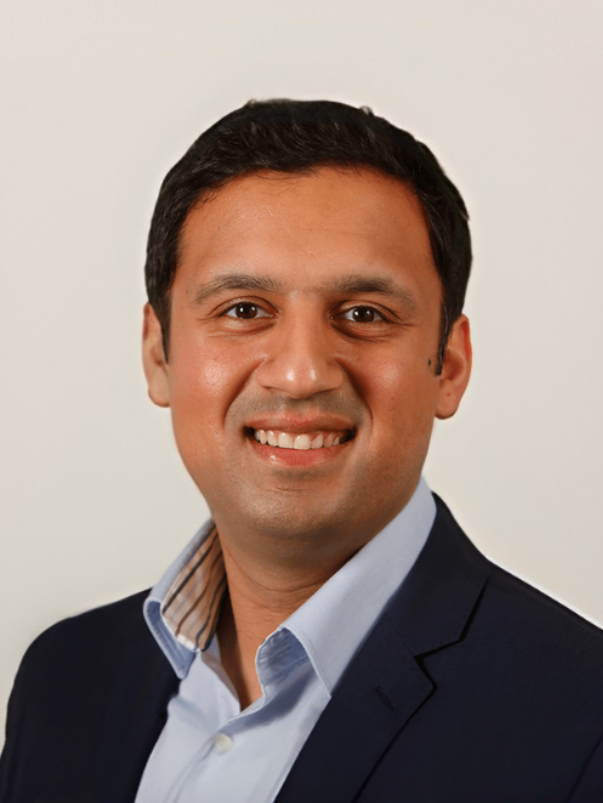

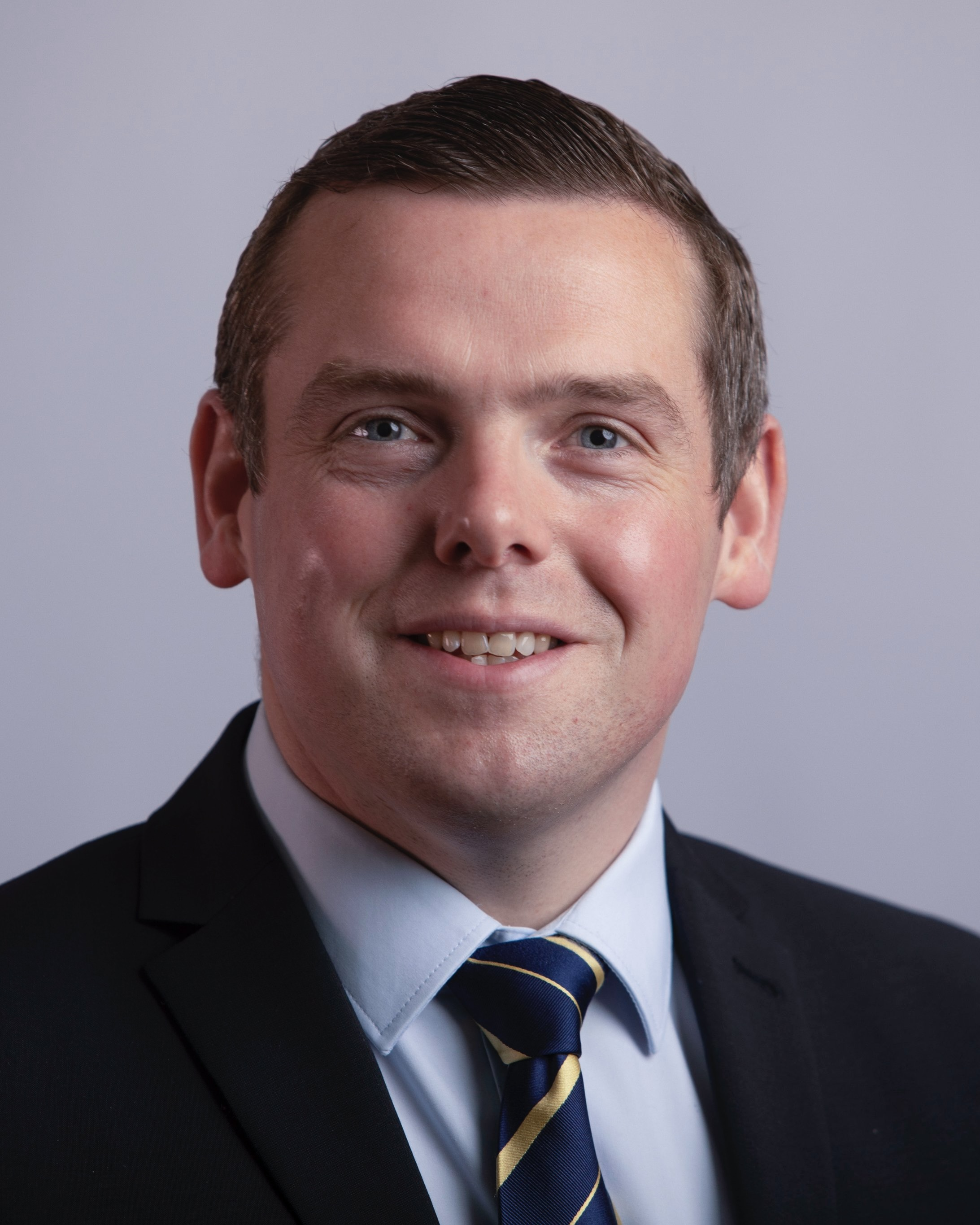

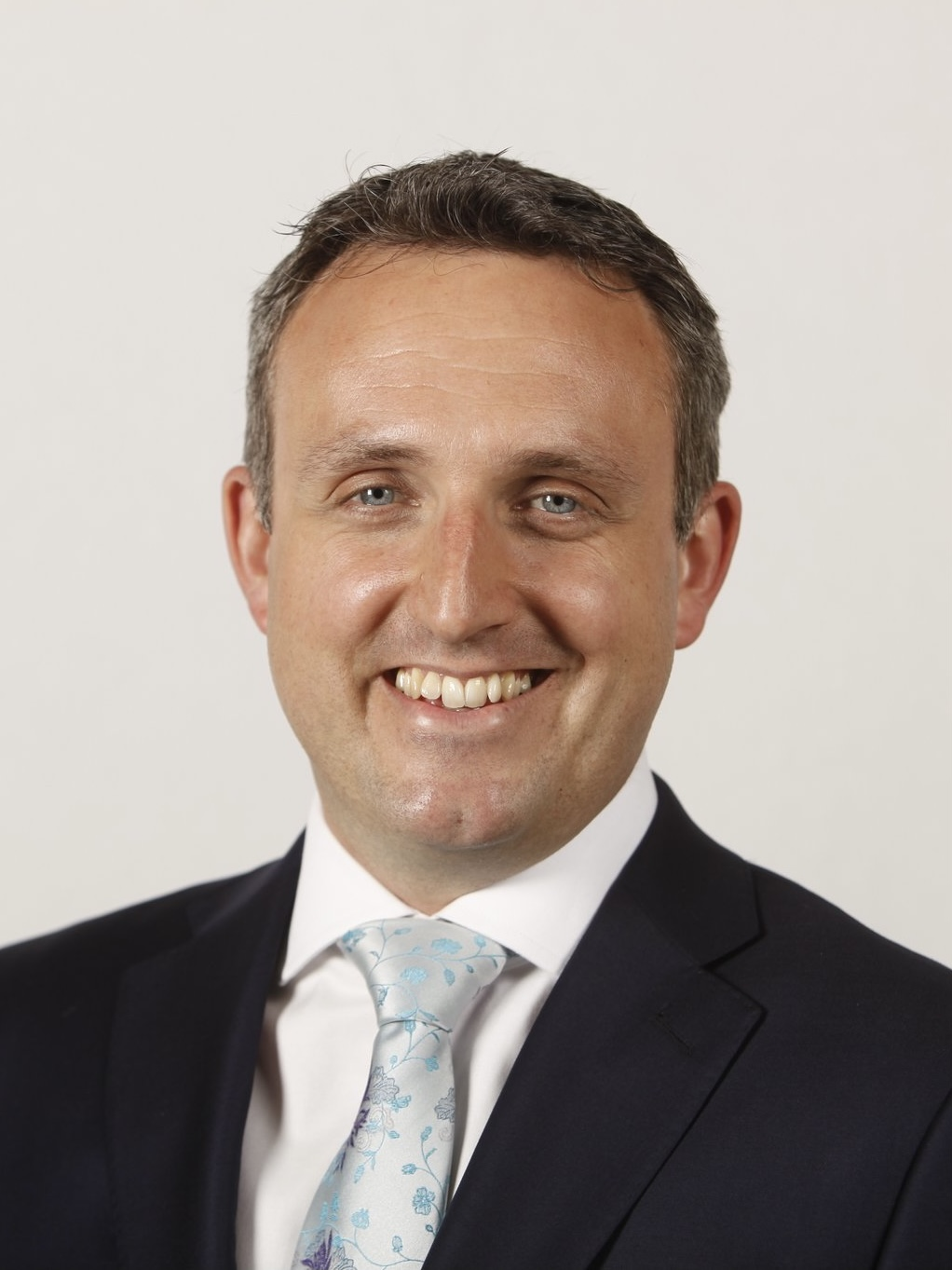

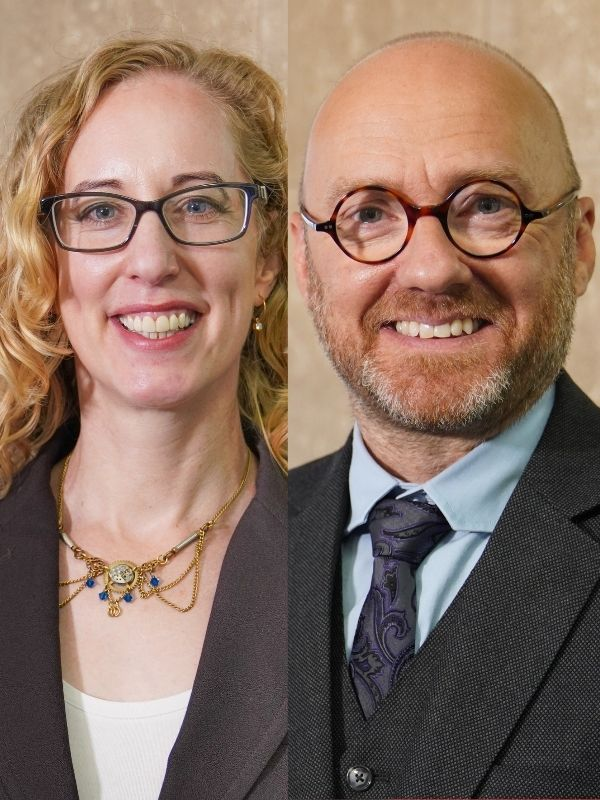
	First party	Second party	Third party
Leader	Nicola Sturgeon	Anas Sarwar	Douglas Ross
Party	SNP	Labour	Conservative
Leader since	14 November 2014	27 February 2021	5 August 2020
Last election	431 seats, 32.3%	262 seats, 20.2%	276 seats, 25.3%
Seats won	453	282	214
Seat change	▲22	▲20	▼63
First preferences	633,252	403,243	364,824
First preferences (%)	34.1%	21.7%	19.7%
Swing (pp)	▲1.8%	▲1.6%	▼5.6%
	Fourth party	Fifth party	Sixth party
	Ind
Leader	None	Alex Cole-Hamilton	Lorna Slater / Patrick Harvie
Party	Independent	Liberal Democrats	Green
Leader since		20 August 2021	1 August 2019 / 22 November 2008
Last election	168 seats, 10.4%	67 seats, 6.8%	19 seats, 4.1%
Seats won	152	87	35
Seat change	▼15	▲20	▲16
First preferences	156,815	159,815	110,791
First preferences (%)	8.4%	8.6%	6.0%
Swing (pp)	▼2.0%	▲1.7%	▲1.8%

The 2022 Scottish local elections were held on 5 May 2022, as part of the 2022 United Kingdom local elections. All 1,226 seats across all 32 Scottish local authorities were up for election and voter turnout was 44.8%.

Compared to the previous elections of 2017, the Scottish National Party (SNP) gained seats and maintained its position as largest party in local government, winning 36.9% of the seats available. Scottish Labour (winning 22.9% of seats) gained seats, whilst the Scottish Conservatives (who won 17.5%) lost many seats, being displaced by Scottish Labour as the second-largest party. Independent candidates also lost seats, whilst the Scottish Liberal Democrats and the Scottish Greens increased their vote share and gained seats across Scotland.

At the 2017 election, no council was won by an overall majority of any party. In the 2022 election, the SNP increased its vote share and secured an overall majority on Dundee City Council, whilst Labour won overall control of West Dunbartonshire Council. Scottish Conservative leader Douglas Ross blamed his party's bad results on the partygate scandal.

The Alba Party and Scottish Family Party ran candidates in around 100 seats each but failed to win any. The Rubbish Party and West Dunbartonshire Community Party held their singular seats, whilst the British Unionist Party gained their first seat from the Conservatives.

== Background ==
The last election was in 2017, which was held five years after the 2012 election, instead of four, in order to avoid clashing with the 2016 Scottish Parliament election.

Boundaries Scotland have conducted a review of electoral arrangements for six councils under the terms of the Islands (Scotland) Act 2018. The Scottish Parliament's Local Government Committee accepted the new boundaries in Na h-Eileanan an Iar, North Ayrshire, Orkney and Shetland, but recommended against approval of the changes in Argyll and Bute and Highland.

== Voting system and eligibility to vote ==
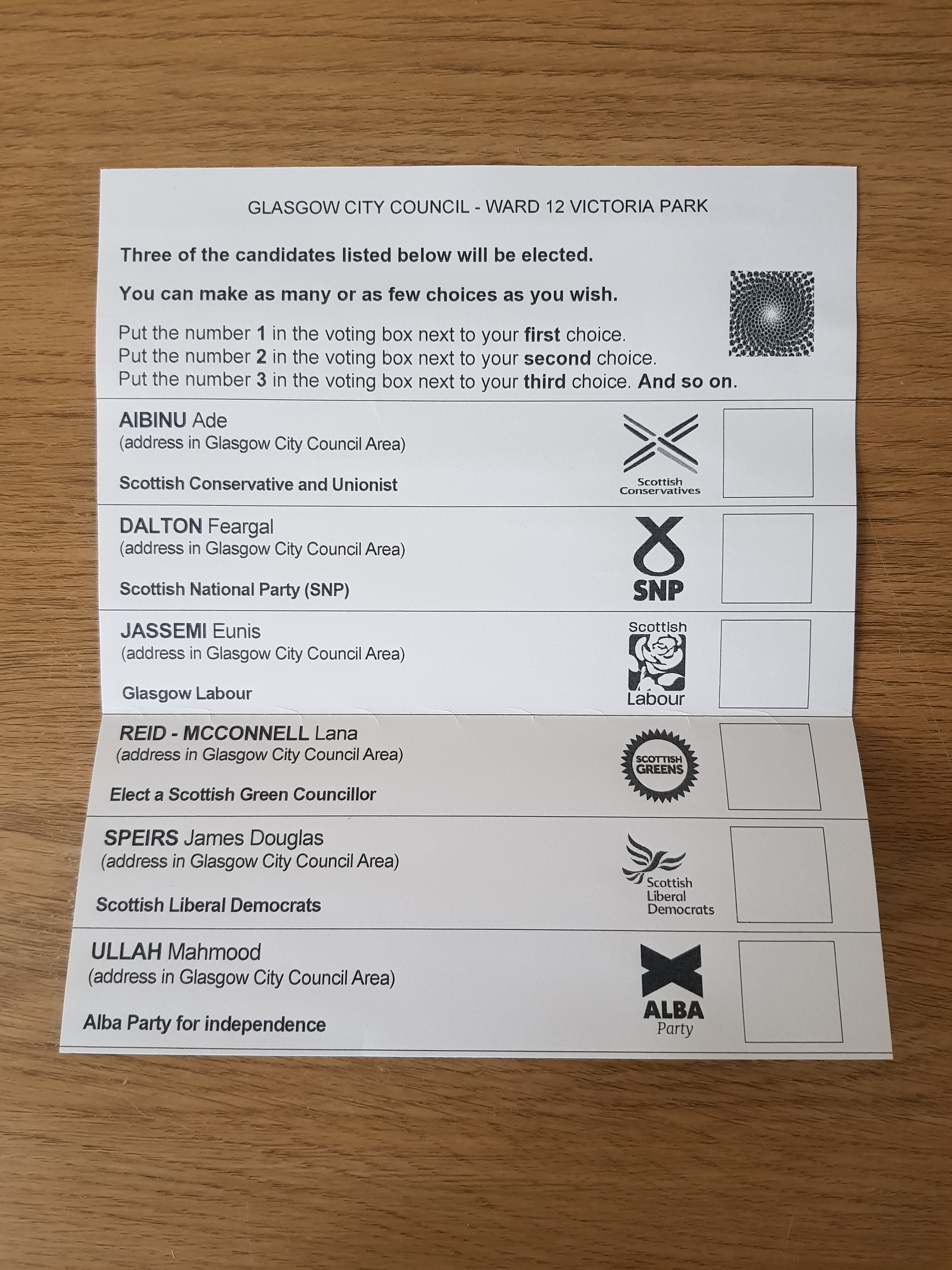
Ballot paper used for the elections in the Victoria Park ward of the Glasgow City Council

Councillors are elected to represent multi-member wards using the single transferable vote (STV) method, which has been used for all elections to local authorities in Scotland since the 2007 election. Previous to this election, in all votes since 2007, wards have been sized such that either 3 or 4 councillors are elected per ward. However, this election was different. The Islands (Scotland) Act 2018 and the Scottish Elections (Reform) Act 2020 have given Boundaries Scotland increased flexibility to vary the size of wards. Mainland wards may now have between 2 and 5 councillors, and single councillor wards are permitted where such a ward includes an inhabited island. For these elections wards represented by one, two or five councillors will only be contested in the four council areas in which ward boundaries have been redrawn after 2017, namely Na h-Eileanan an Iar, North Ayrshire, Orkney and Shetland.

Overall, the 32 local authorities had one one-seat district (Arran), seven two-seat districts and three five-seat districts (North Ayrshire) in addition to the bulk of the members elected in three and four seat districts.

All registered electors (British citizens and all other foreign nationals with leave to remain, including refugees) who are aged 16 or over on polling day are entitled to vote in the local elections. A person who has two homes (such as a university student who has a term-time address and lives at home during holidays) can register to vote at both addresses as long as they are not in the same electoral area, and can vote in the local elections for the two different local councils.

Individuals must have been registered to vote by midnight on 18 April 2022. The deadlines to register for a postal vote and proxy vote were 19 and 26 April 2022, respectively.

== Opinion polling ==
First preference voting intention
Date(s) conducted	Polling organisation/client	Sample size	SNP	Con	Lab	Lib Dem	Green	Alba	Others	Lead
5 May 2022	2022 Scottish local elections	–	34.1%	19.7%	21.7%	8.6%	6.0%	0.7%	15.3%	12.4%
29 Apr – 3 May 2022	Survation	893	41%	17%	23%	8%	5%	1%	4%	18%
24–28 Mar 2022	Survation/Ballot Box Scotland	1,002	44%	18%	23%	6%	3%	1%	4%	21%
20–26 Oct 2021	Panelbase/Scot Goes Pop	1,001	45%	22%	21%	6%	4%	2%	<1%	23%
4 May 2017	2017 Scottish local elections	–	32.3%	25.3%	20.2%	6.8%	4.1%	–	10.4%	7.0%

== Results ==
Summary of the May 2022 Scottish council election results
Party	First-preference votes			Councils		Seats		
Party	Count	Of total (%)	Change	Count	Change	Count	Of total (%)	Change
SNP	633,251	34.1	▲1.8	1	▲1	453	37.0	▲22
Labour	403,243	21.7	▲1.6	1	▲1	282	23.1	▲20
Conservative	364,824	19.6	▼5.7	0	Steady	214	17.5	▼62
Independents	156,751	8.4	▼2.0	3	Steady	149	12.2	▼19
Liberal Democrats	159,815	8.6	▲1.7	0	Steady	87	7.1	▲20
Green	110,791	6.0	▲1.9	0	Steady	35	2.9	▲16
West Dunbartonshire Community	1,462	0.1	Steady	0	Steady	1	0.1	Steady
BUP	859	0.1	Steady	0	Steady	1	0.1	▲1
Rubbish	787	0.0	Steady	0	Steady	1	0.1	Steady
Alba	12,335	0.7	New	0	Steady	0	0.0	New
Scottish Family	6,857	0.4	New	0	Steady	0	0.0	New
Scottish Socialist	1,058	0.1	▲0.1	0	Steady	0	0.0	Steady
TUSC	1,022	0.1	Steady	0	Steady	0	0.0	Steady
Independence for Scotland	742	0.0	New	0	Steady	0	0.0	New
Libertarian	698	0.0	Steady	0	Steady	0	0.0	Steady
Freedom Alliance	555	0.0	New	0	Steady	0	0.0	New
Volt UK	421	0.0	New	0	Steady	0	0.0	New
Socialist Labour	381	0.0	Steady	0	Steady	0	0.0	Steady
UKIP	372	0.0	▼0.2	0	Steady	0	0.0	Steady
Women's Equality	228	0.0	New	0	Steady	0	0.0	New
Social Democratic	222	0.0	Steady	0	Steady	0	0.0	Steady
Sovereignty	154	0.0	New	0	Steady	0	0.0	New
Communist	119	0.0	New	0	Steady	0	0.0	New
Pensioner's	75	0.0	New	0	Steady	0	0.0	New
Vanguard	74	0.0	New	0	Steady	0	0.0	New
Workers	61	0.0	New	0	Steady	0	0.0	New
Scottish Eco-Federalist	24	0.0	New	0	Steady	0	0.0	New
Vacant seats	—N/a					3	0.0	▲3
No overall control	—N/a			27	▼2	—N/a		
Total	1,857,181	100.0	Steady	32	Steady	1,226	100.00	Steady

== Councils ==
Council	2017		2022		Article
Council	Largest party	Control	Largest party	Control	Article
Aberdeen City	SNP	Lab, Con + Ind coalition	SNP	SNP + Lib Dem coalition	Details
Aberdeenshire	Conservative	Con, Lib Dem + Ind coalition	Conservative	Con, Lib Dem + Ind coalition	Details
Angus	SNP + Ind	Ind, Con + Lib Dem coalition	SNP	SNP minority	Details
Argyll and Bute	SNP	Ind, Con + Lib Dem coalition	SNP	Con, Ind + Lib Dem coalition	Details
Clackmannanshire	SNP	SNP minority	SNP	SNP minority	Details
Dumfries and Galloway	Conservative	SNP + Lab coalition	Conservative	SNP, Lab, Ind + Lib Dem coalition	Details
Dundee City	SNP	SNP minority	SNP	SNP majority	Details
East Ayrshire	SNP	SNP minority	SNP	SNP minority	Details
East Dunbartonshire	SNP	Con + Lib Dem coalition	SNP	SNP minority	Details
East Lothian	Labour	Labour minority	Labour	Labour minority	Details
East Renfrewshire	Conservative	SNP, Lab + Ind coalition	SNP	Lab + Ind coalition	Details
City of Edinburgh	SNP	SNP + Lab coalition	SNP	Labour minority	Details
Falkirk	SNP	SNP + Ind coalition	SNP	SNP minority	Details
Fife	SNP	SNP + Lab coalition	SNP	Labour minority	Details
Glasgow City	SNP	SNP minority	SNP	SNP minority	Details
Highland	Independent	Ind, Lib Dem + Lab coalition	SNP	SNP + Ind coalition	Details
Inverclyde	Labour	Labour minority	Labour	Labour minority	Details
Midlothian	Labour	Labour minority	SNP	SNP minority	Details
Moray	SNP	SNP minority	Conservative	Conservative minority	Details
Na h-Eileanan Siar	Independent	Independent majority	Independent	Independent majority	Details
North Ayrshire	Lab + SNP	Labour minority	SNP	SNP minority	Details
North Lanarkshire	SNP	Labour minority	SNP	SNP minority	Details
Orkney Islands	Independent	Independent majority	Independent	Ind + Green coalition	Details
Perth and Kinross	Conservative	Conservative minority	SNP	SNP minority	Details
Renfrewshire	SNP	SNP minority	SNP	SNP minority	Details
Scottish Borders	Conservative	Con + Ind coalition	Conservative	Con + Ind coalition	Details
Shetland Islands	Independent	Independent majority	Independent	Independent majority	Details
South Ayrshire	Conservative	SNP, Lab + Ind coalition	Conservative	Conservative minority	Details
South Lanarkshire	SNP	SNP minority	SNP	Lab, Lib Dem + Ind coalition	Details
Stirling	SNP + Con	SNP + Lab coalition	SNP	Labour minority	Details
West Dunbartonshire	SNP	SNP + Ind coalition	Labour	Labour majority	Details
West Lothian	SNP	Labour minority	SNP	Labour minority	Details

== See also ==
- 2022 Northern Ireland Assembly election
- 2022 United Kingdom local elections
- 2022 Welsh local elections
- Politics of Scotland
