= 2007 Orkney Islands Council election =

2007 Scottish local government election

- 3 May 2007

All 21 seats to Orkney Islands Council 11 seats needed for a majority
	First party
Leader	Stephen Hagan
Party	Independent
Leader's seat	North Isles
Last election	21 seats, 100%
Seats before	21
Seats won	21
Seat change	Steady
Popular vote	8,719
Percentage	99.2%
Swing	▼0.8%
Council Convener before election
Stephen Hagan
Independent
Council Convener after election
Stephen Hagan
Independent

Elections to Orkney Islands Council were held on 3 May 2007, the same day as the Scottish local government elections and the Scottish Parliament general election. The election was the first one using six new wards created as a result of the Local Governance (Scotland) Act 2004, each ward elects three or four councillors using a single transferable vote system form of proportional representation. The new wards replace 21 single-member wards which used the plurality (first past the post) system of election.

All the seats were won by independent candidates.

== Election result ==
2007 Orkney Islands Council election result
Party	Seats	Gains	Losses	Net gain/loss	Seats %	Votes %	Votes	+/−
Independent	21			Steady	100.0	99.2	8,719	▼0.8
Conservative	0			Steady	0.0	0.8	68	New
Total	21						8,787	

Notes:

- Votes are the sum of first preference votes across all council wards. The net gain/loss and percentage changes relate to the result of the previous Scottish local elections on 1 May 2003. This is because STV has an element of proportionality which is not present unless multiple seats are being elected. This may differ from other published sources showing gain/loss relative to seats held at the dissolution of Scotland's councils. This was the first election to use the STV electoral system so only net gains/losses are shown.

== Ward results ==
=== Kirkwall East ===
Kirkwall East – 4 seats
Party	Candidate	FPv%	Count					
Party	Candidate	FPv%	1	2	3	4	5	6
Independent	Janice Annal (Incumbent)	27.6	460					
Independent	Steven Heddle	21.6	359					
Independent	Bobby Leslie	16.8	280	319	326	356		
Independent	Mike Drever (Incumbent)	13.1	218	247	251	273	282	322
Independent	Alastair MacLeod	9.0	150	168	173	192	198	244
Independent	David Murdoch	6.5	108	118	122	131	133	
Independent	Alastair MacDonald	5.4	90	101	103			
Valid: 1,665 Quota: 334

=== Kirkwall West and Orphir ===
Kirkwall West and Orphir – 4 seats
Party	Candidate	FPv%	Count			
Party	Candidate	FPv%	1	2	3	4
Independent	Jack Moodie	38.1	601			
Independent	David Tullock	16.5	260	321		
Independent	Allan Leslie (Incumbent)	15.3	241	304	305	334
Independent	Roderick McLeod (Incumbent)	14.7	232	295	296	317
Independent	Ian MacDonald (Incumbent)	11.3	178	214	214	232
Independent	Alasdair Thom	4.1	64	88	89	
Valid: 1,576 Quota: 315

=== Stromness and South Isles ===
Stromness and South Isles – 3 seats
Party	Candidate	FPv%	Count					
Party	Candidate	FPv%	1	2	3	4	5	6
Independent	James Stockan (Incumbent)	41.6	539					
Independent	John Eccles	17.9	232	259	272	278	280	327
Independent	Ian Johnstone (Incumbent)	16.6	215	305	312	331		
Independent	John Brown	9.5	123	153	158	167	169	215
Independent	Fiona Matheson	8.7	113	145	149	157	159	
Independent	Maurice Davidson	3.1	40	51	51			
Independent	Terry Thomson	2.5	33	38				
Valid: 1,294 Quota: 324

=== West Mainland ===
West Mainland – 4 seats
Party	Candidate	FPv%	Count					
Party	Candidate	FPv%	1	2	3	4	5	6
Independent	Jimmy Moar (Incumbent)	30.7	545					
Independent	Alistair Gordon (Incumbent)	22.5	400					
Independent	Eoin Scott	13.6	242	292	303	321	337	369
Independent	Rob Crichton	11.4	203	248	259	268	293	320
Independent	Tom Flett	7.6	135	175	181	189	209	250
Independent	Ian Flett	5.0	88	98	100	116	136	
Independent	Norman Shearer	4.7	83	95	98	104		
Conservative	Mark Jones	3.8	68	72	74			
Independent	Bob Gilmour	0.7	12	13	14			
Valid: 1,776 Quota: 356

=== East Mainland, South Ronaldsay and Burray ===
East Mainland, South Ronaldsay and Burray – 3 seats
Party	Candidate	FPv%	Count				
Party	Candidate	FPv%	1	2	3	4	5
Independent	Andrew Drever (Incumbent)	39.0	524				
Independent	Jim Foubister (Incumbent)	29.5	396				
Independent	Russ Madge	12.0	161	189	200	208	249
Independent	George Linnit	10.8	145	186	199	206	246
Independent	Mac Petrie	7.6	102	166	185	186	
Independent	Simon Treasure	1.0	14	17	18		
Valid: 1,342 Quota: 336

=== North Isles ===
North Isles – 3 seats
Party	Candidate	FPv%	Count					
Party	Candidate	FPv%	1	2	3	4	5	6
Independent	Stephen Hagan (Incumbent)	40.9	463					
Independent	Stephen Clackson	13.6	154	164	181	188	209	211
Independent	Sam Harcus	11.7	133	211	219	264	307	
Independent	Graham Sinclair	10.9	123	148	160	182	207	213
Independent	Bob Trigg	9.3	105	111	116			
Independent	William Muir	6.4	72	102	130	145		
Independent	Leo Martini-Brown	3.6	41	42				
Independent	George Mowat-Brown	1.3	27	31				
Independent	Barbara Jeffreys	1.3	15	18				
Valid: 1,133 Quota: 284
