= 2012 Orkney Islands Council election =

2012 Scottish local government election

- 3 May 2012

All 21 seats to Orkney Islands Council 11 seats needed for a majority
| | First party |
|---|---|
| Leader | Steven Heddle |
| Party | Independent |
| Leader's seat | Kirkwall East |
| Last election | 21 seats, 99.2% |
| Seats before | 21 |
| Seats won | 21 |
| Seat change | Steady |
| Popular vote | 8,161 |
| Percentage | 96.9% |
| Swing | ▼2.3% |
Council leader before election
Stephen Hagan
Independent
Council leader after election
Steven Heddle
Independent

The 2012 Orkney Islands Council election took place on 3 May 2012 to elect members of Orkney Council. The election used the six wards created as a result of the Local Governance (Scotland) Act 2004, with each ward electing three or four Councillors using the single transferable vote system form of proportional representation, with 21 Councillors being elected.

As in 2007 Independents took all of the 21 seats on the council. The Scottish National Party contested 4 wards in Orkney for the first time in 2012 but only secured 3% of the vote. The council was again administered solely by Independents.

== Election result ==
2012 Orkney Islands Council election result
| Party | Seats | Gains | Losses | Net gain/loss | Seats % | Votes % | Votes | +/− |
|---|---|---|---|---|---|---|---|---|
| Independent | 21 | 9 | 9 | Steady | 100.0 | 96.9 | 8,161 | ▼2.3 |
| SNP | 0 | 0 | 0 | Steady | 0.0 | 3.0 | 251 | New |
| UKIP | 0 | 0 | 0 | Steady | 0.0 | 0.1 | 11 | New |
| Total | 21 | | | | | | 8,423 | |

Notes:

- Votes are the sum of first preference votes across all council wards. The net gain/loss and percentage changes relate to the result of the previous Scottish local elections on 3 May 2007. This is because STV has an element of proportionality which is not present unless multiple seats are being elected. This may differ from other published sources showing gain/loss relative to seats held at the dissolution of Scotland's councils.

== Ward results ==
=== Kirkwall East ===
Kirkwall East – 4 seats
| Party | Candidate | FPv% | Count | | | | | | | |
| Party | Candidate | FPv% | 1 | 2 | 3 | 4 | 5 | 6 | 7 | 8 |
|---|---|---|---|---|---|---|---|---|---|---|
| Independent | Janice Annal (incumbent) | 34.5 | 533 | | | | | | | |
| Independent | Steven Heddle (incumbent) | 26.5 | 409 | | | | | | | |
| Independent | Gwenda Shearer | 13.7 | 212 | 278 | 307 | 319 | | | | |
| Independent | Bill Stout | 9.1 | 140 | 198 | 227 | 232 | 235 | 263 | 300 | 377 |
| SNP | John Mowat | 6.0 | 93 | 105 | 115 | 116 | 117 | 132 | | |
| Independent | Alastair MacLeod | 5.0 | 77 | 114 | 129 | 136 | 137 | 151 | 174 | |
| Independent | Gerry McGuinness | 3.5 | 54 | 69 | 77 | 85 | 87 | | | |
| Independent | Paul Dawson | 1.8 | 28 | 37 | 40 | | | | | |
Electorate: 3,391 Valid: 1,546 Spoilt: 6 Quota: 310 Turnout: 45.7%

=== Kirkwall West and Orphir ===
Kirkwall West and Orphir – 4 seats
| Party | Candidate | FPv% | Count | | | | | | | | | | |
| Party | Candidate | FPv% | 1 | 2 | 3 | 4 | 5 | 6 | 7 | 8 | 9 | 10 | 11 |
|---|---|---|---|---|---|---|---|---|---|---|---|---|---|
| Independent | Jack Moodie (incumbent) | 31.1 | 476 | | | | | | | | | | |
| Independent | John Richards | 18.5 | 283 | 318 | | | | | | | | | |
| Independent | David Tullock (incumbent) | 14.1 | 215 | 263 | 266 | 267 | 270 | 273 | 288 | 301 | 321 | | |
| Independent | Alan Clouston | 13.9 | 213 | 232 | 234 | 236 | 243 | 248 | 260 | 272 | 281 | 285 | 368 |
| Independent | David Dawson | 10.6 | 162 | 186 | 188 | 188 | 192 | 206 | 213 | 219 | 232 | 236 | |
| SNP | Lynda Baird | 3.3 | 50 | 52 | 53 | 53 | 53 | 54 | 56 | | | | |
| Independent | Laurence Leonard | 2.7 | 42 | 49 | 49 | 52 | 52 | 54 | 58 | 64 | | | |
| Independent | Sandra Shearer | 2.2 | 34 | 43 | 44 | 44 | 45 | 50 | | | | | |
| Independent | Raymond Smith | 2.0 | 30 | 37 | 38 | 40 | 43 | | | | | | |
| Independent | Bryan Leslie | 1.0 | 16 | 18 | 19 | 19 | | | | | | | |
| Independent | Walter Haywood | 0.6 | 9 | 9 | 9 | | | | | | | | |
Electorate: 3,289 Valid: 1,530 Spoilt: 13 Quota: 307 Turnout: 46.9%

=== Stromness and South Isles ===
Stromness and South Isles – 3 seats
| Party | Candidate | FPv% | Count | | | | | |
| Party | Candidate | FPv% | 1 | 2 | 3 | 4 | 5 | 6 |
|---|---|---|---|---|---|---|---|---|
| Independent | James Stockan (incumbent) | 53.7 | 576 | | | | | |
| Independent | Rob Crichton | 11.8 | 126 | 234 | 235 | 250 | 262 | 364 |
| Independent | Maurice Davidson | 11.4 | 122 | 172 | 174 | 189 | 216 | 270 |
| Independent | John Brown | 10.7 | 115 | 178 | 180 | 196 | 213 | |
| Independent | Terry Thomson | 5.7 | 61 | 82 | 84 | 100 | | |
| SNP | Arthur Alexander Robertson | 5.7 | 61 | 79 | 81 | | | |
| UKIP | Delia Mary Hall | 1.0 | 11 | 15 | | | | |
Electorate: 2,210 Valid: 1,072 Spoilt: 10 Quota: 269 Turnout: 48.8%

=== West Mainland ===
West Mainland – 4 seats
| Party | Candidate | FPv% | Count | | | | | | | |
| Party | Candidate | FPv% | 1 | 2 | 3 | 4 | 5 | 6 | 7 | 8 |
|---|---|---|---|---|---|---|---|---|---|---|
| Independent | Harvey Johnston | 23.3 | 427 | | | | | | | |
| Independent | Alistair Gordon (incumbent) | 17.5 | 322 | 333 | 335 | 353 | 371 | | | |
| Independent | Jimmy Moar (incumbent) | 15.6 | 287 | 303 | 307 | 317 | 319 | 320 | 353 | 470 |
| Independent | Owen Tierney | 13.6 | 249 | 257 | 263 | 277 | 308 | 309 | 358 | 446 |
| Independent | Eoin F. Scott (incumbent) | 13.0 | 238 | 246 | 249 | 254 | 276 | 277 | 314 | |
| Independent | Victor Muir | 7.2 | 132 | 136 | 139 | 143 | 150 | 150 | | |
| Independent | Andrew Appleby | 4.0 | 74 | 77 | 81 | 93 | | | | |
| Independent | Carol Granere | 4.0 | 73 | 75 | 78 | | | | | |
| Independent | David Ward | 1.8 | 33 | 33 | | | | | | |
Electorate: 3,379 Valid: 1,835 Spoilt: 6 Quota: 368 Turnout: 54.5%

=== East Mainland, South Ronaldsay and Burray ===
East Mainland, South Ronaldsay and Burray – 3 seats
| Party | Candidate | FPv% | Count | | | | | | |
| Party | Candidate | FPv% | 1 | 2 | 3 | 4 | 5 | 6 | 7 |
|---|---|---|---|---|---|---|---|---|---|
| Independent | Russ Madge (incumbent) | 40.7 | 564 | | | | | | |
| Independent | Andrew Drever (incumbent) | 18.8 | 261 | 315 | 331 | 344 | 375 | | |
| Independent | Jim Foubister (incumbent) | 16.3 | 226 | 247 | 253 | 263 | 280 | 289 | 368 |
| Independent | Gill Smee | 11.0 | 152 | 209 | 226 | 236 | 257 | 267 | |
| Independent | Ken Ross | 7.1 | 98 | 118 | 123 | 128 | | | |
| SNP | Ewan Loudon | 3.4 | 47 | 56 | 59 | | | | |
| Independent | Eleanor MacLeod | 2.7 | 37 | 52 | | | | | |
Electorate: 2,536 Valid: 1,385 Spoilt: 9 Quota: 347 Turnout: 55.0%

=== North Isles ===
North Isles – 3 seats
| Party | Candidate | FPv% | Count | | | |
| Party | Candidate | FPv% | 1 | 2 | 3 | 4 |
|---|---|---|---|---|---|---|
| Independent | Stephen Hagan (incumbent) | 41.0 | 433 | | | |
| Independent | Stephen Clackson | 29.2 | 308 | | | |
| Independent | Gillian Skuse | 16.1 | 170 | 219 | 237 | |
| Independent | Graham Sinclair (incumbent) | 13.6 | 144 | 238 | 249 | 375 |
Electorate: 1,854 Valid: 1,055 Spoilt: 3 Quota: 264 Turnout: 57.5%

== Aftermath ==
=== 2014 Kirkwall West and Orphir by-election ===
Kirkwall West and Orphir Independent Cllr Jack Moodie resigned his seat for personal reasons on 9 September 2014. A by-election was held on 27 November 2014 and was won by the Independent Leslie Manson.

Kirkwall West and Orphir by-election (27 November 2014) – 1 seat
| Party | Candidate | FPv% | Count |
| Party | Candidate | FPv% | 1 |
|---|---|---|---|
| Independent | Leslie Manson | 57.5 | 647 |
| Independent | Gillian Skuse | 25.0 | 281 |
| Independent | Lorraine McBrearty | 12.6 | 142 |
| Independent | Laurence Leonard | 4.9 | 55 |
Valid: 1,125 Quota: 563

=== 2015 West Mainland by-election ===
West Mainland Independent Cllr Alistair Gordon died on 19 May 2015. A by-election was held on 18 August 2015 to fill the vacancy and it was won by the Independent Rachael King.

West Mainland by-election (18 August 2015) – 1 seat
| Party | Candidate | FPv% | Count |
| Party | Candidate | FPv% | 1 |
|---|---|---|---|
| Orkney Manifesto Group | Rachael King | 51.4 | 593 |
| Independent | Barbara Foulkes | 38.6 | 281 |
| Green | Fiona Grahame | 10.0 | 115 |
Valid: 1,154 Quota: 578
