= Kirkwall East (ward) =

Electoral ward of Orkney, Scotland

- Orkney Islands
- Boundary of Kirkwall East in Orkney from 2007–2022.
- Population: 4,823 (2021)
- Electorate: 3,700 (2022)
- Major settlements: Kirkwall (part of)
- Scottish Parliament constituency: Orkney
- Scottish Parliament region: Highlands and Islands
- UK Parliament constituency: Orkney and Shetland

Current ward
- Created: 2007
- Number of councillors: 4
- Councillor: John Ross Scott (Green)
- Councillor: Steven Heddle (Independent)
- Councillor: Gwenda Shearer (Independent)
- Councillor: David Dawson (Independent)
- Created from: Berstane and Work; Brandyquoy; Lynnfield; Papdale; Pickaquoy; Shapinsay and Kirkwall Harbour; Warrenfield

Kirkwall East is one of the six electoral wards of Orkney Islands Council. Created in 2007, the ward elects four councillors using the single transferable vote electoral system and covers an area with a population of 4,823 people.

Local politics in Orkney is traditionally non-partisan and the ward has only once elected a councillor affiliated to a political party.

== Boundaries ==
The ward was created following the Fourth Statutory Reviews of Electoral Arrangements ahead of the 2007 Scottish local elections. As a result of the Local Governance (Scotland) Act 2004, local elections in Scotland would use the single transferable vote electoral system from 2007 onwards so Kirkwall East was formed from an amalgamation of several previous first-past-the-post wards. It contained all of the former Brandyquoy and Papdale wards, the majority of the former Berstane and Work ward and part of the former Lynnfield and Shapinsay and Kirkwall Harbour wards as well as a small area from the former Pickaquoy and Warrenfield wards. As its name suggests, Kirkwall East covers the eastern half of the town of Kirkwall on Mainland as well as a rural area to the north and east of the town.

The ward's boundaries were unchanged following the Fifth Statutory Reviews of Electoral Arrangements ahead of the 2017 Scottish local elections.

Following the 2019 Reviews of Electoral Arrangements, an interim review of island areas as a result of the Islands (Scotland) Act 2018, the ward's eastern boundary was extended to include Kirkwall Airport and neighbouring communities and the boundary with Kirkwall West and Orphir was amended by Kirkwall Harbour to make a more identifiable boundary.

== Councillors ==
Election	Councillors			
2007	Janice Annal	Steven Heddle	Bobby Leslie	Mike Drever
2012	Janice Annal	Steven Heddle	Gwenda Shearer	Bill Stout
2017	John Ross Scott	Steven Heddle	Gwenda Shearer	David Dawson
2022	John Ross Scott	Steven Heddle	Gwenda Shearer	David Dawson

== Election results ==
=== 2022 election ===
Kirkwall East - 4 seats
Party	Candidate	FPv%	Count	
Party	Candidate	FPv%	1	2
Green	John Ross Scott (incumbent)	28.1	476	
Independent	Steven Heddle (incumbent)	25.2	428	
Independent	Gwenda Shearer (incumbent)	24.3	413	
Independent	David Dawson (incumbent)	16.8	285	340
Independent	Graham MacDonald	5.4	92	134
Electorate: 3,700 Valid: 1,694 Spoilt: 6 Quota: 339 Turnout: 45.9%

=== 2017 election ===
Kirkwall East – 4 seats
Party	Candidate	FPv%	Count						
Party	Candidate	FPv%	1	2	3	4	5	6	7
Independent	Steven Heddle (incumbent)	29.1	474						
Independent	Gwenda Shearer (incumbent)	21.1	344						
Independent	John Ross Scott	17.9	291	328					
Independent	David Dawson	15.7	256	294	299	300	302	322	356.7
Independent	Rikki Lidderdale	6.9	113	139	143	144	146	165	188
Independent	Ingrid Windwick Jolly	4.6	75	89	92	93	96	116	
Independent	Mike Berston	3.7	60	75	78	78	80		
Independent	Paul Dawson	0.9	14	15	16	16			
Electorate: 3,470 Valid: 1,627 Spoilt: 14 Quota: 326 Turnout: 47.3%

=== 2012 election ===
Kirkwall East – 4 seats
Party	Candidate	FPv%	Count							
Party	Candidate	FPv%	1	2	3	4	5	6	7	8
Independent	Janice Annal (incumbent)	34.5	533							
Independent	Steven Heddle (incumbent)	26.5	409							
Independent	Gwenda Shearer	13.7	212	278	307	319				
Independent	Bill Stout	9.1	140	198	227	232	235	263	300	377
SNP	John Mowat	6.0	93	105	115	116	117	132		
Independent	Alastair MacLeod	5.0	77	114	129	136	137	151	174	
Independent	Gerry McGuinness	3.5	54	69	77	85	87			
Independent	Paul Dawson	1.8	28	37	40					
Electorate: 3,391 Valid: 1,546 Spoilt: 6 Quota: 310 Turnout: 45.7%

=== 2007 election ===
Kirkwall East – 4 seats
Party	Candidate	FPv%	Count					
Party	Candidate	FPv%	1	2	3	4	5	6
Independent	Janice Annal (Incumbent)	27.6	460					
Independent	Steven Heddle	21.6	359					
Independent	Bobby Leslie	16.8	280	319	326	356		
Independent	Mike Drever (Incumbent)	13.1	218	247	251	273	282	322
Independent	Alastair MacLeod	9.0	150	168	173	192	198	244
Independent	David Murdoch	6.5	108	118	122	131	133	
Independent	Alastair MacDonald	5.4	90	101	103			
Valid: 1,665 Quota: 334
