= 2017 Orkney Islands Council election =

2017 Scottish local government election

- 4 May 2017

All 21 seats to Orkney Islands Council 11 seats needed for a majority
- Turnout: 49.7%
	First party	Second party	Third party
Leader	Steven Heddle	Rachael King	Steve Sankey
Party	Independent	Orkney Manifesto Group	Green
Leader's seat	Kirkwall East	West Mainland	East Mainland, South Ronaldsay and Burray
Last election	21 seats, 96.9%	N/A	N/A
Seats before	21	0
Seats won	18	2	1
Seat change	▼3	▲2	▲1
Popular vote	6,162	894	350
Percentage	83.2%	12.1%	4.7%
Swing	▼13.6%	New	New
Council leader before election
Steven Heddle
Independent
Council leader after election
James Stockan
Independent

The 2017 Orkney Islands Council election took place on 4 May 2017 to elect members of Orkney Islands Council. The election used the six wards created as a result of the Local Governance (Scotland) Act 2004, with each ward electing three or four Councillors using the single transferable vote system form of proportional representation, with 21 councillors being elected.

The Scottish Green Party contested two wards in Orkney for the first time. Another group; the Orkney Manifesto Group, ran as a registered party for the first time, gaining the largest vote share of any party in the council's history. The OMG advocates the politicisation of the Orkney Islands Council, however is unaffiliated to any national party. The group has a liberal-left political outlook.

== Election result ==
2017 Orkney Islands Council election result
Party	Seats	Gains	Losses	Net gain/loss	Seats %	Votes %	Votes	+/−
Independent	18	9	12	▼3	85.7	83.2	6,162	▼13.6
Orkney Manifesto Group	2	2	0	▲2	9.5	12.1	894	New
Green	1	1	0	▲1	4.8	4.7	350	New
Total	21						7,406	

Notes:

- Votes are the sum of first preference votes across all council wards. The net gain/loss and percentage changes relate to the result of the previous Scottish local elections on 3 May 2012. This is because STV has an element of proportionality which is not present unless multiple seats are being elected. This may differ from other published sources showing gain/loss relative to seats held at the dissolution of Scotland's councils.

== Ward results ==
=== Kirkwall East ===
Kirkwall East – 4 seats
Party	Candidate	FPv%	Count						
Party	Candidate	FPv%	1	2	3	4	5	6	7
Independent	Steven Heddle (incumbent)	29.1	474						
Independent	Gwenda Shearer (incumbent)	21.1	344						
Independent	John Ross Scott	17.9	291	328					
Independent	David Dawson	15.7	256	294	299	300	302	322	356.7
Independent	Rikki Lidderdale	6.9	113	139	143	144	146	165	188
Independent	Ingrid Windwick Jolly	4.6	75	89	92	93	96	116	
Independent	Mike Berston	3.7	60	75	78	78	80		
Independent	Paul Dawson	0.9	14	15	16	16			
Electorate: 3,470 Valid: 1,627 Spoilt: 14 Quota: 326 Turnout: 47.3%

=== Kirkwall West and Orphir ===
Kirkwall West and Orphir – 4 seats
Party	Candidate	FPv%	Count						
Party	Candidate	FPv%	1	2	3	4	5	6	7
Independent	Leslie Manson (incumbent)	44.6	646						
Orkney Manifesto Group	John Richards (incumbent)	23.0	333						
Independent	Sandy Cowie	11.1	160	244	255	257	283	283	356
Independent	Barbara Foulkes	10.4	150	256	267	269	290		
Independent	Barbara Leslie	7.5	109	152	158	161	177	177	
Independent	Alastair Macleod	2.7	39	83	88	93			
Independent	Max Thomas	0.7	10	16	17				
Electorate: 3,466 Valid: 1,447 Spoilt: 19 Quota: 290 Turnout: 42.3%

=== Stromness and South Isles ===
Stromness and South Isles – 3 seats
Party	Candidate	Votes	%
Independent	Rob Crichton (incumbent)	Unopposed	
Independent	James Stockan (incumbent)	Unopposed	
Independent	Magnus Thomson	Unopposed	
Registered electors			

=== West Mainland ===
West Mainland – 4 seats
Party	Candidate	FPv%	Count					
Party	Candidate	FPv%	1	2	3	4	5	6
Orkney Manifesto Group	Rachael King (incumbent)	30.6	561					
Independent	Harvey Johnston (incumbent)	29.2	536					
Independent	Owen Tierney (incumbent)	20.2	370					
Independent	Duncan Allan Tullock	10.4	191	245	327	328	344	369
Independent	Jo Jones	3.8	70	106	130	131	142	170
Green	Helen Woodsford-Dean	3.6	66	95	104	104	114	
Independent	Sean Michael Lewis	2.1	39	51	59	60		
Electorate: 3,538 Valid: 1,833 Spoilt: 14 Quota: 367 Turnout: 52.2%

=== East Mainland, South Ronaldsay and Burray ===
East Mainland, South Ronaldsay and Burray – 3 seats
Party	Candidate	FPv%	Count			
Party	Candidate	FPv%	1	2	3	4
Independent	Andrew Drever (incumbent)	35.7	509			
Green	Steve Sankey	19.9	284	301	383	
Independent	Norman Rae Craigie	16.7	238	281	354	362
Independent	John Stanley Groundwater	14.1	201	229		
Independent	Jim Foubister (incumbent)	13.5	192	231	265	269
Electorate: 2,725 Valid: 1,424 Spoilt: 12 Quota: 357 Turnout: 52.7%

=== North Isles ===
North Isles – 3 seats
Party	Candidate	FPv%	Count							
Party	Candidate	FPv%	1	2	3	4	5	6	7	8
Independent	Graham Sinclair (incumbent)	27.0	290							
Independent	Kevin Woodbridge	23.8	256	261	274					
Independent	Stephen Clackson (incumbent)	18.3	197	200	207	208	219	231	247	321
Independent	Stuart Roy McIvor	11.0	118	120	124	125	132	143	168	
Independent	Ralph Stevenson	6.5	70	72	77	78	92	121		
Independent	Simon Tarry	6.5	70	72	72	73	78			
Independent	George Arthur Mowat-Brown	3.6	39	39	40	41				
Independent	Billy Muir	3.3	35	36						
Electorate: 1,840 Valid: 1,075 Spoilt: 5 Quota: 269 Turnout: 58.7%

== Aftermath ==
=== 2020 North Isles by-election ===
North Isles Independent Cllr Kevin Woodbridge died on 19 April 2020 after a short illness. A by-election was held on 1 October 2020 and was won by Kevin Woodbridge's daughter, Heather Woodbridge.

North Isles by-election (1 October 2020) – 1 seat
Party	Candidate	FPv%	Count
Party	Candidate	FPv%	1
Independent	Heather Woodbridge	69.9	638
Labour	Coilla Drake	17.3	158
Independent	Claire Stevens	8.2	75
Independent	Daniel Adams	4.6	42
Electorate: 1,814 Valid: 913 Spoilt: 7 Quota: 457 Turnout: 50.7%
