= Orkney Islands (constituency) =

- County constituency for the Scottish Parliament
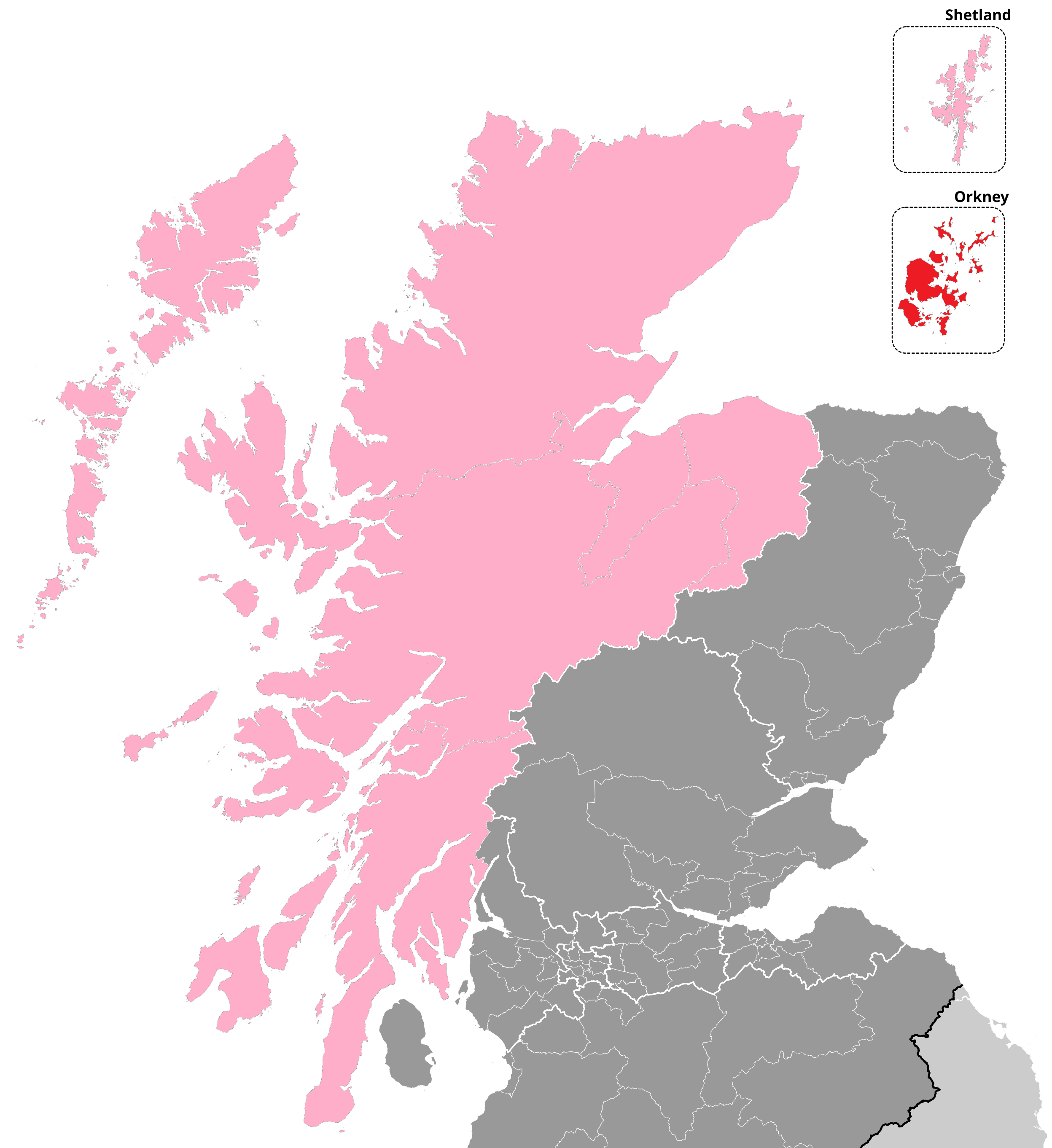

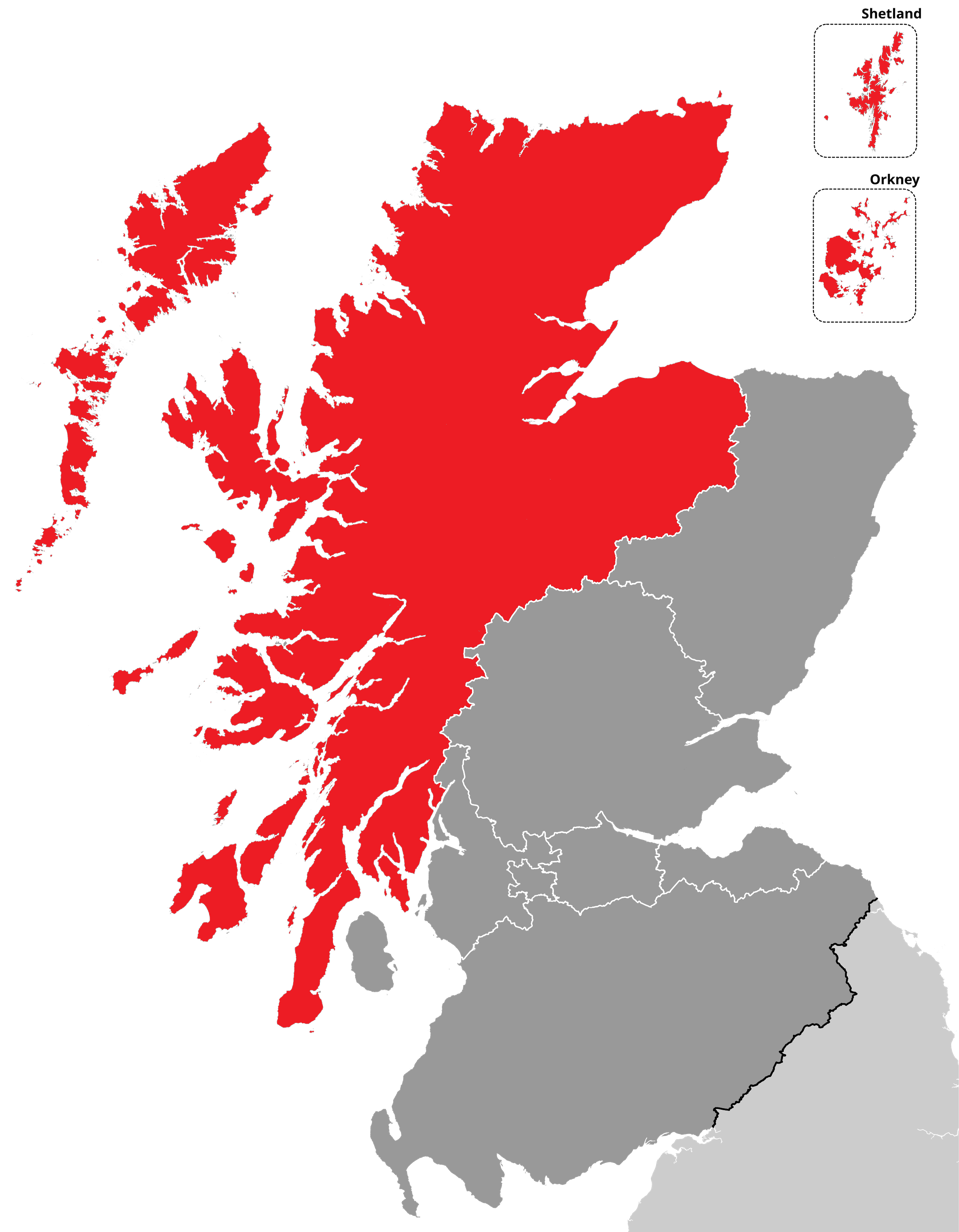
- Orkney Islands shown within the Highlands and Islands electoral region, and the region shown within Scotland
- Electoral region: Highlands and Islands
- Population: 22,020 (2024)
- Electorate: 17,841 (2026)

Current constituency
- Created: 1999
- Party: Liberal Democrats
- MSP: Liam McArthur
- Council area: Orkney Islands

Orkney Islands is a county constituency of the Scottish Parliament covering the council area of Orkney. It elects one Member of the Scottish Parliament (MSP) by the first past the post method of election. Under the additional-member electoral system used for elections to the Scottish Parliament, it is also one of eight constituencies in the Highlands and Islands electoral region, which elects seven additional members, in addition to the eight constituency MSPs, to produce a form of proportional representation for the region as a whole.

Orkney Islands has been held by the Liberal Democrats at all elections since the formation of the Scottish Parliament in 1999, with the current MSP being Liam McArthur, who won the seat at the 2007 Scottish Parliament election. The former Deputy First Minister Jim Wallace represented the constituency from 1999 to 2007.

== Electoral region ==
Orkney Islands is part of the Highlands and Islands electoral region; the other seven constituencies are: Argyll and Bute, Caithness, Sutherland and Ross, Inverness and Nairn, Moray, Na h-Eileanan an Iar, Shetland Islands and Skye, Lochaber and Badenoch.

The region covers most of Argyll and Bute council area, all of the Highland council area, most of the Moray council area, all of the Orkney Islands council area, all of the Shetland Islands council area and all of Na h-Eileanan Siar.

== Constituency boundaries and council area ==
The Orkney Islands constituency was created at the same time as the Scottish Parliament, for the 1999 Scottish Parliament election, to cover the Orkney Islands council area. The constituency is protected in law due to its geographical separation from other parts of Scotland, and therefore its boundaries are not subject to review.

For elections to the House of Commons of the Parliament of the United Kingdom, Orkney is covered by the Orkney and Shetland constituency, which also covers Shetland.

It contains all six of the Orkney Council wards: East Mainland, South Ronaldsay and Burray; Kirkwall East; Kirkwall West and Orphir; North Isles; Stromness and South Isles; West Mainland.

== Member of the Scottish Parliament ==
Election	Member	Party
1999	Jim Wallace	Liberal Democrat
2007	Liam McArthur	Liberal Democrat

== Election results ==
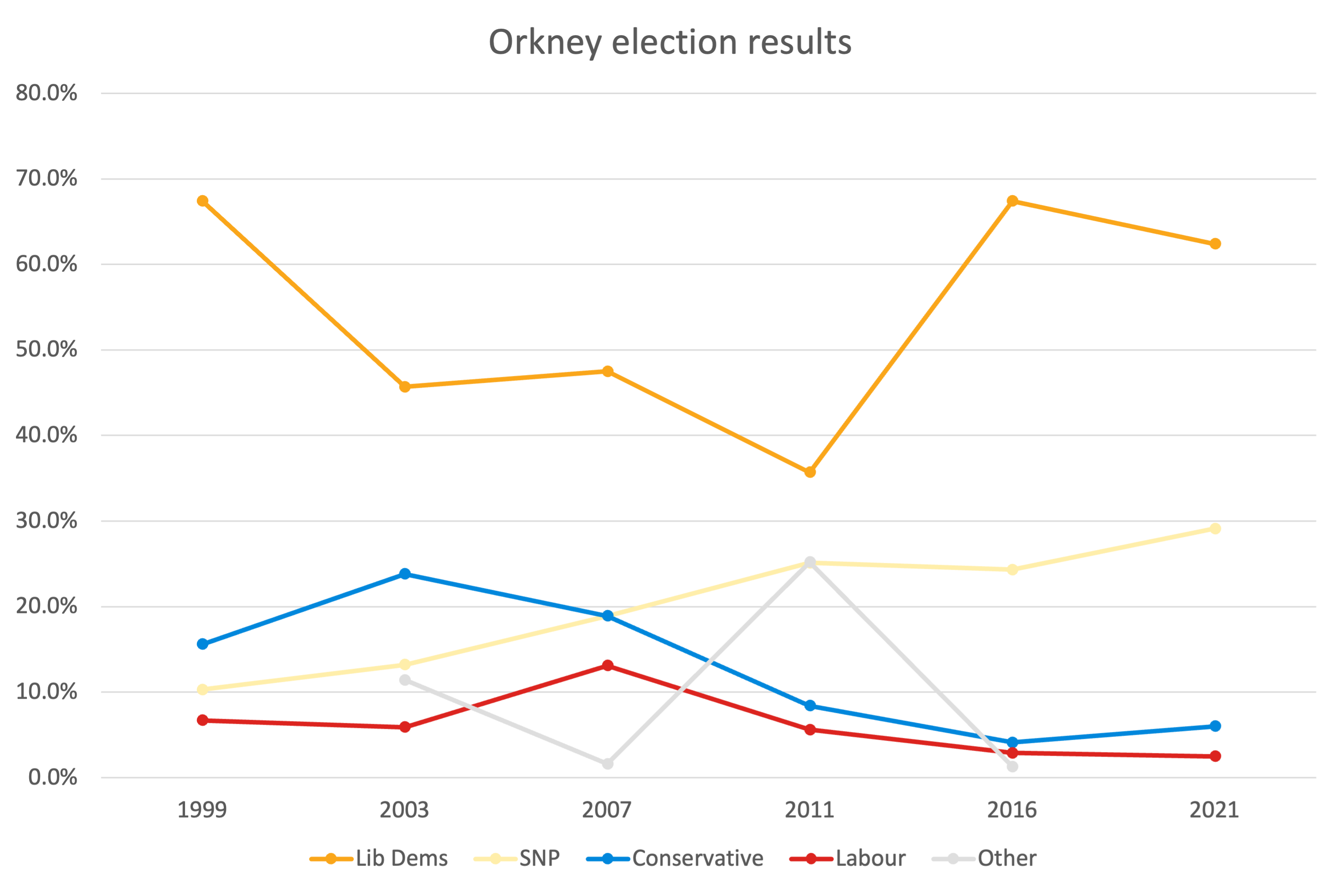
Orkney election results (1999-2021)

=== 2020s ===
2026 Scottish Parliament election: Orkney Islands
Party	Candidate	Constituency			Regional		
Party	Candidate	Votes	%	±%	Votes	%	±%
Liberal Democrats	Liam McArthur (Note: Incumbent member for this constituency)	7,221	70.2	▲7.8	4,037	39.4	▲8.2
SNP	Robert Leslie	1,661	16.2	▼12.9	1,755	17.1	▼12.1
Green					1,329	13.0	▲3.5
Reform	John Coupland	844	8.2	New	1,250	12.2	▲11.9
Conservative	Jamie Halcro Johnston (Note: Incumbent member on the party list, or for another constituency)	358	3.5	▼2.5	958	9.4	▼9.6
Labour	Mike MacLeod	199	1.9	▼0.6	463	4.5	▼1.8
Scottish Family					100	1.0	▼0.1
Independent Green Voice					58	0.6	New
ISP					49	0.5	New
Independent	Duncan MacPherson				43	0.4	New
AtLS					41	0.4	New
Scottish Christian					38	0.4	New
Scottish Rural Party					29	0.3	New
Scottish Libertarian					28	0.3	Steady
Workers Party					23	0.2	New
Scottish Socialist					19	0.2	New
Advance UK					16	0.2	New
Independent	Mick Rice				2	0.0	New
Majority		5,560	54.1	▲20.8			
Valid votes		10,283			10,238		
Invalid votes		32			36		
Turnout		10,315	57.8	▼7.8	10,274	57.6	▼7.9
Liberal Democrats hold		Swing					
Notes

2021 Scottish Parliament election: Orkney Islands
Party	Candidate	Constituency			Regional		
Party	Candidate	Votes	%	±%	Votes	%	±%
Liberal Democrats	Liam McArthur (Note: Incumbent member for this constituency)	7,238	62.4	▼4.9	3,616	31.2	▼2.1
SNP	Robert Leslie	3,369	29.1	▲4.7	3,384	29.2	▲5.6
Conservative	Sam Bown	699	6.0	▲1.9	2,202	19.0	▲7.7
Green					1,104	9.5	▲2.9
Labour	Coilla Drake	290	2.5	▼0.4	725	6.3	▲1.5
Scottish Family					127	1.1	New
Alba					98	0.8	New
Independent	Andy Wightman (Note: Incumbent member on the list for Lothian region, having been elected as a member of the Scottish Greens in 2016)				87	0.8	New
All for Unity					63	0.5	New
Scottish Libertarian					32	0.3	New
Reform					31	0.3	New
UKIP					30	0.3	▼2.2
Abolish the Scottish Parliament					28	0.2	New
Freedom Alliance (UK)					22	0.2	New
Restore Scotland					18	0.2	New
TUSC					15	0.1	New
Independent	Hazel Mansfield				4	0.0	New
Majority		3,869	33.3	▼9.7			
Valid votes		11,596			11,586		
Invalid votes		25			27		
Turnout		11,621	65.6	▲3.4	11,613	65.5	▲3.4
Liberal Democrats hold		Swing		▼4.9			

=== 2010s ===
2016 Scottish Parliament election: Orkney Islands
Party	Candidate	Constituency			Regional		
Party	Candidate	Votes	%	±%	Votes	%	±%
Liberal Democrats	Liam McArthur (Note: Incumbent member for this constituency)	7,096	67.4	▲31.7	3,515	33.4	▲8.0
SNP	Donna Heddle	2,562	24.3	▼0.8	2,491	23.6	▼12.2
Independent	James Stockan				1,775	16.8	New
Conservative	Jamie Halcro Johnston	435	4.1	▼4.3	1,193	11.3	▲0.5
Green					696	6.6	▲0.4
Labour	Gerard McGarvey	304	2.9	▼2.7	506	4.8	▼4.2
UKIP					255	2.4	▼1.5
Independent	Paul Dawson	137	1.3	New			
Scottish Christian					49	0.5	▼1.0
Solidarity					30	0.3	▲0.1
RISE					27	0.3	New
Majority		4,534	43.1	▲32.6			
Valid votes		10,534			10,537		
Invalid votes		28			19		
Turnout		10,562	62.1	▲12.2	10,556	62.1	▲12.3
Liberal Democrats hold		Swing		▲16.3			
Notes

2011 Scottish Parliament election: Orkney Islands
Party	Candidate	Constituency			Regional		
Party	Candidate	Votes	%	±%	Votes	%	±%
Liberal Democrats	Liam McArthur (Note: Incumbent member for this constituency)	2,912	35.7	▼11.8	2,062	25.4	
Independent	James Stockan	2,052	25.2	New			
SNP	Donna Heddle	2,044	25.1	▲6.2	2,906	35.8	
Conservative	Jamie Halcro Johnston	686	8.4	▼10.5	875	10.8	
Labour	William Sharkey	458	5.6	▼7.5	730	9.0	
Green					501	6.2	
UKIP					316	3.9	
All-Scotland Pensioners Party					128	1.6	
Scottish Christian					123	1.5	
BNP					63	0.8	
Socialist Labour					59	0.7	
Scottish Socialist					30	0.4	
Solidarity					18	0.2	
Others					316	3.9	
Majority		860	10.5	▼17.9			
Valid votes		8,152			8,127		
Invalid votes		29			51		
Turnout		8,181	49.9	▼3.5	8,178	49.8	
Liberal Democrats hold		Swing		▼9.0			

=== 2000s ===
2007 Scottish Parliament election: Orkney Islands
Party	Candidate	Votes	%	±%
Liberal Democrats	Liam McArthur	4,113	47.5	+1.8
SNP	John Mowat	1,637	18.9	+5.7
Conservative	Helen Gardiner	1,632	18.9	−4.9
Labour	Iain MacDonald	1,134	13.1	+7.2
Independent	Barrie Johnson	137	1.6	New
Majority		2,476	28.6	+6.7
Turnout		8,653	53.4	+1.7
Liberal Democrats hold		Swing	+3.4	

Scottish Parliament election 2003: Orkney Islands
Party	Candidate	Votes	%	±%
Liberal Democrats	Jim Wallace	3,659	45.7	−21.7
Conservative	Christopher Zawadski	1,904	23.8	+8.2
SNP	John Mowat	1,056	13.2	+2.9
Scottish Socialist	John Aberdein	914	11.42	New
Labour	Richard Meade	471	5.9	−0.9
Majority		1,755	21.9	−29.9
Turnout		8,004	51.7	−5.3
Liberal Democrats hold		Swing	-15.0	

=== 1990s ===
Scottish Parliament election 1999: Orkney Islands
Party	Candidate	Votes	%
Liberal Democrats	Jim Wallace	6,010	67.4
Conservative	Christopher Zawadski	1,391	15.6
SNP	John Mowat	917	10.3
Labour	Angus Macleod	600	6.7
Majority		4,619	51.8
Turnout		8,918	57.0
Liberal Democrats win (new seat)			

New title	Constituency represented by the Deputy First Minister of Scotland; 1999–2005	Succeeded by Aberdeen South
