= Kristopher Leask =

Scottish politician

Kristopher Leask MSP
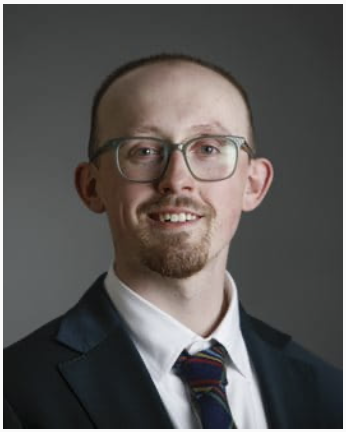

Member of Scottish Parliament for Highlands and Islands (1 of 7 Regional MSPs)
- Incumbent
- Assumed office 7 May 2026

Personal details
- Born: Kirkwall, Orkney, Scotland
- Party: Scottish Greens
- Education: University of St Andrews; Heriot-Watt University

Kristopher Leask is a Scottish politician who has served as a Member of Scottish Parliament for Highlands and Islands since May 2026. He is a member of the Scottish Greens.

== Early life and education ==
Leask attended Glaitness Primary School and Kirkwall Grammar School before studying International Relations at the University of St Andrews from 2017 to 2021. He completed an MSc in Renewable Energy Development at Heriot-Watt University's Stromness campus from 2021 to 2022.

== Early political activity ==
While a student, Leask co-authored Being Heard: Helping To Create The Next Generation of Civic Leaders in Scotland, a 2018 report with Orkney Islands councillor John Ross Scott on young people's engagement with decision-makers in Scotland's 32 councils. In 2020, Leask and Scott published Being Heard: One Year On, a follow-up report on young people's participation in local government decision-making.

== Orkney Islands Council ==
He was elected as the Scottish Green councillor for Kirkwall West and Orphir ward in the 2022.

Following the election, Leask and Scott were the only party-affiliated councillors on Orkney Islands Council. Leask served as vice-chair of the council's planning committee, local review body, licensing committee and licensing board, and worked on issues including net zero, decarbonisation, development planning, low-carbon travel and tourism.

According to his council register of interests, Leask worked part-time as a parliamentary campaigns assistant for Ariane Burgess from October 2021 to April 2023, and part-time as policy manager for Community Energy Scotland from April 2023 to June 2024.

== Scottish Parliament ==
In 2025, Leask was among 32 Scottish Green candidates endorsed for the upcoming Scottish Parliament election by Rainbow Greens, the party's LGBTQIA+ group.

Leask was elected as a regional member for the Highlands and Islands at the 2026 Scottish Parliament election
