= Orkney Manifesto Group =

Minor party in the Orkney Islands

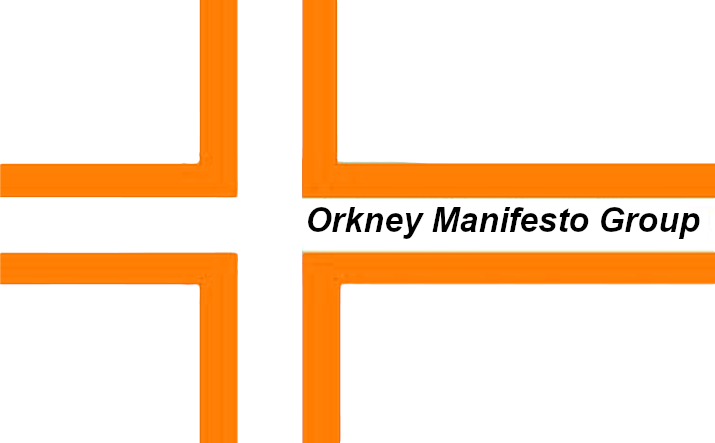
- Leader: Rachael King
- Founded: March 2013; 13 years ago
- Dissolved: 29 March 2022; 4 years ago
- Headquarters: Sycamore; Main Street; Kirkwall; KW15 1BU

Website
- orkneycommunities.co.uk/omg

The Orkney Manifesto Group (OMG) was a minor political party in Orkney, Scotland. The group advocated for politicisation of Orkney Islands Council, believing that party-based representation would offer more robust democratic governance than the current council of elected independents. The OMG started as an alliance of three independents who campaigned on a joint manifesto for the 2012 election, before finally registering as a party in 2013.

The party won two seats at the 2017 Orkney Islands Council election.

The party de-registered with the Electoral Commission on 29 March 2022, and as a result fielded no candidates in the 2022 Orkney election. Rachael King was the only OMG councillor to seek re-election, as an independent candidate.

== Election results ==
=== West Mainland by-election ===
In its first electoral test as a registered party, Rachael King was elected in a by-election for the West Mainland ward following the death of the incumbent councillor Alistair Gordon (first elected as an Independent, he had helped set up the OMG). Having won a majority of first preference votes, she was elected in the first round.

West Mainland by-election, 18 August 2015
Party	Candidate	Votes	%	±%
Orkney Manifesto Group	Rachael King		51.3	
Independent	Barbara Foulkes		38.6	
Green	Fiona Grahame		9.9	
Turnout		1,154	34	
Orkney Manifesto Group gain from Independent		Swing		

=== Orkney Islands Council election ===
Year	Votes	FPV%	Seats	+/-
2017	894	12.1%	2 / 21	▲2
