= Orkney Islands Council =

Local authority for Orkney, Scotland

- Flag

- Council logo

Type
- Type: Unitary council

History
- Founded: 16 May 1975

Leadership
- Convener: Graham Bevan, Independent since 16 May 2022
- Leader: Heather Woodbridge, Independent since 20 February 2024
- Chief Executive: Oliver Reid since 23 January 2023

Structure
- Seats: 21 councillors
- Graph of the party split among 21 seats.
- Political groups: All parties (21) Independent (20) Green (1)
- Length of term: Full council elected every 5 years

Elections
- Voting system: Single transferable vote
- Last election: 5 May 2022
- Next election: 6 May 2027

Motto
- Boreas domus mare amicus (Latin: "The north our home, the sea our friend")

Meeting place
- Council Offices, School Place, Kirkwall, KW15 1NY

Website
- www.orkney.gov.uk

Orkney Islands Council (Scottish Gaelic: Comhairle Arcaibh) is the local authority for the Orkney Islands, one of the 32 council areas of Scotland. It was established in 1975 by the Local Government (Scotland) Act 1973 and was largely unaffected by the Scottish local government changes of 1996. The council is based in Kirkwall.

It provides services in the areas of environmental health, roads, social work, community development, organisational development, economic development, building standards, trading standards, housing, waste, education, burial grounds, port and harbours and others. The council collects Council Tax.

The council is also the harbour authority for Orkney and its marine services division manages the operation of the islands' 29 piers and harbours.

== History ==
Orkney had been administered by Commissioners of Supply from 1667 and then by Orkney County Council from 1890 to 1975. The county council was abolished in 1975 and replaced by the Orkney Islands Council, which also took over the functions previously exercised by Orkney's lower-tier authorities, being the town councils of the two burghs of Kirkwall and Stromness, and the councils of the area's landward districts. The new council created in 1975 was an islands council of an area legally called Orkney.

Further local government reform in 1996 introduced single-tier council areas across all of Scotland. The councils of the three island areas created in 1975, including Orkney, continued to provide the same services after 1996, but their areas were re-designated as council areas. The geographic area's legal name was changed from Orkney to 'Orkney Islands' as part of the 1996 reforms, allowing the council to retain the name 'Orkney Islands Council'. The council has been a member of the Islands Forum since 2022.

In 2023 the council saw a motion to review Orkney's relationship to the United Kingdom, with council leader James Stockan claiming Orkney does not get fair funding. The motion sought to emulate the relationship the Channel Islands have with the United Kingdom. Other alternatives proposed included emulating the Faroe Islands' autonomy, becoming an overseas territory like the Falklands, or seeing the territory returned to Norway.

== Political control ==
The first election was held in 1974, with the council initially operating as a shadow authority alongside the outgoing authorities until the new system came into force on 16 May 1975. A majority of the seats on the council have been held by independent councillors since 1975.

Party in control	Years
Independent	1975–present

=== Leadership ===
The council appoints a convener, who chairs full council meetings and acts as the civic figurehead. In 2017 the council introduced the additional role of leader of the council to act as the council's political leader. The leaders since 2017 have been:

Councillor	Party	From	To
James Stockan	Independent	16 May 2017	5 Feb 2024
Heather Woodbridge	Independent	20 Feb 2024	

On her appointment in February 2024, Heather Woodbridge was the youngest local authority leader in Scotland, being 29 years old.

The first convener of Orkney Islands Council, George Marwick, had been the last vice-convener of the old Orkney County Council. The conveners since Orkney Islands Council formally came into being in 1975 have been:

Councillor	Party	From	To
George Marwick	Independent	16 May 1975	May 1978
Edwin Eunson	Independent	1978	May 1990
John (Jackie) Tait	Independent	22 May 1990	1994
Hugh Halcro-Johnston	Independent	24 May 1994	May 2003
Stephen Hagan	Independent	15 May 2003	May 2012
Steven Heddle	Independent	May 2012	May 2017
Harvey Johnston	Independent	16 May 2017	May 2022
Graham Bevan	Independent	16 May 2022	

=== Composition ===
Following the 2022 election, and subsequent changes up to October 2026, the composition of the council was:

Party	Seats
Independent	20
Green	1
Total	21

The next election is due in 2027.

== Elections ==
Since the last boundary changes in 2022, the council has comprised 21 councillors representing 6 wards, with each ward electing three or four councillors. Elections are held every five years.

=== Wards ===
- East Mainland, South Ronaldsay and Burray
- Kirkwall East
- Kirkwall West and Orphir
- North Isles
- Stromness and South Isles
- West Mainland

== Premises ==
The council is based at the Council Offices on School Place in Kirkwall. The building comprises the former Kirkwall Grammar School and the neighbouring former Paterson Church, with modern extensions linking the older buildings. The former Grammar School was built c. 1890 and converted to become the council's offices in 1978. The Paterson Church, or East Church, was built in 1847 and converted and incorporated into the council offices in the early 2000s.

== See also ==
- Constitutional status of Orkney, Shetland and the Western Isles
- Lerwick Declaration
