= 2007 Scottish local elections =

- 3 May 2007

All 1,222 seats to Scottish councils
- Turnout: 52.8% (▲3.2%)
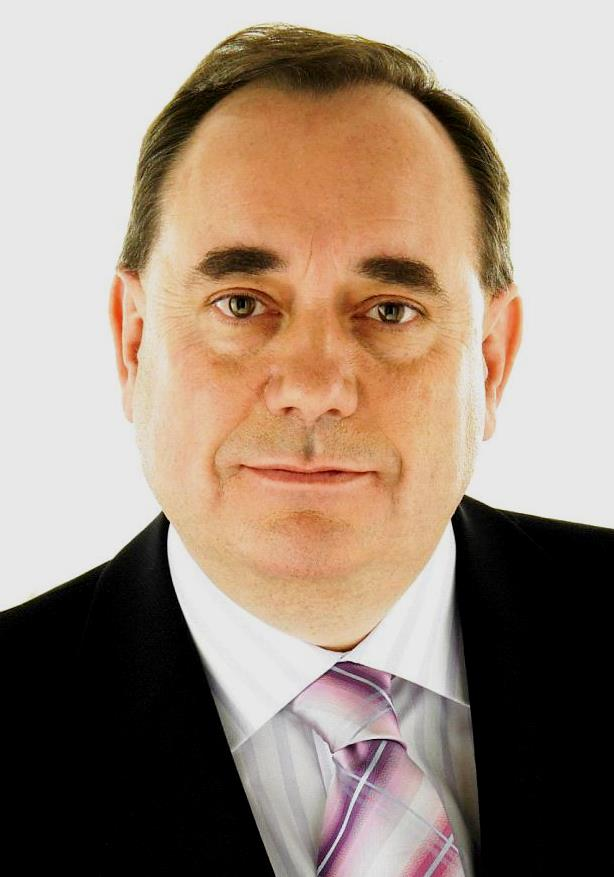

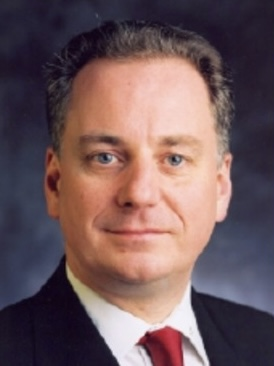

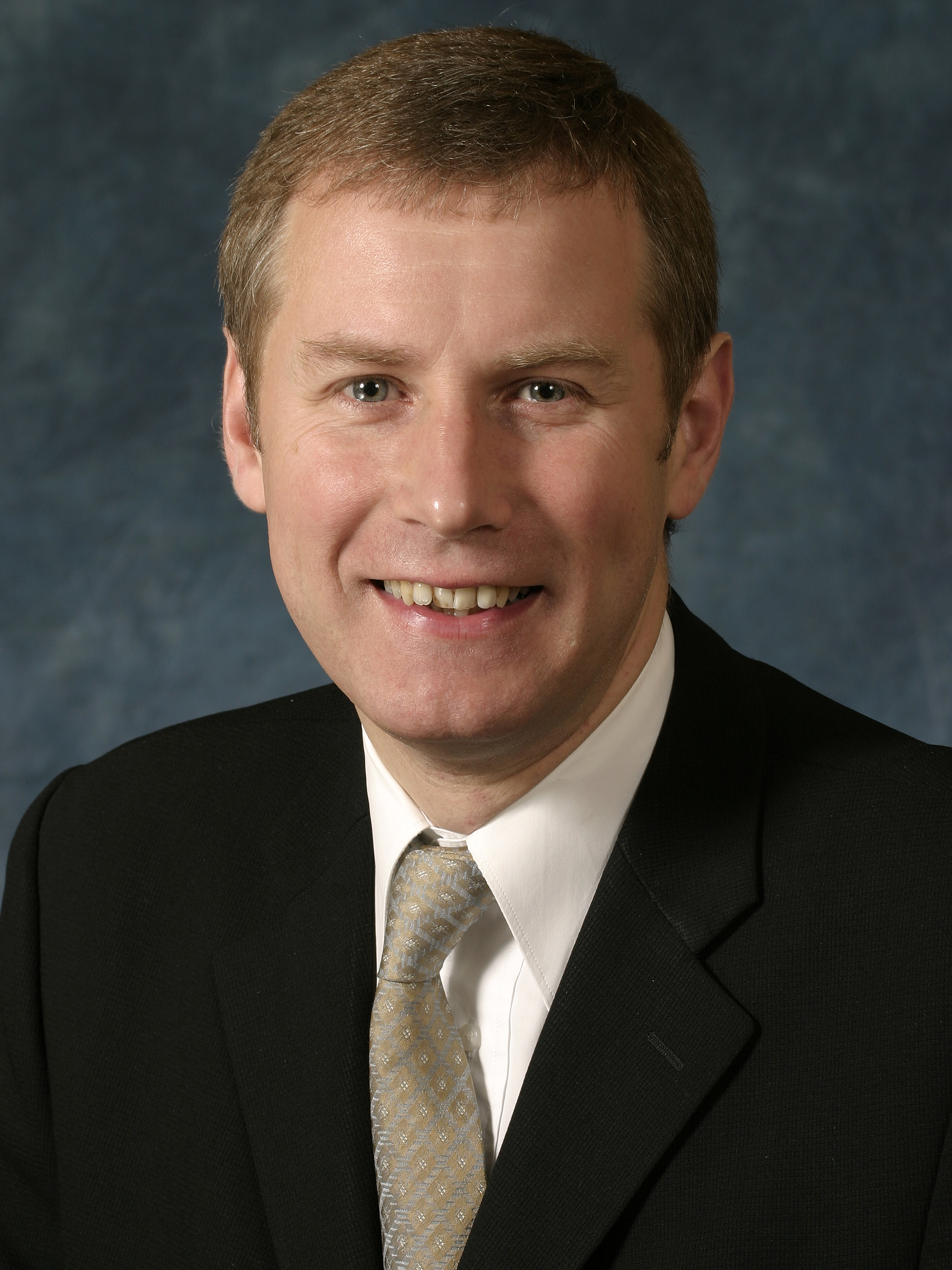

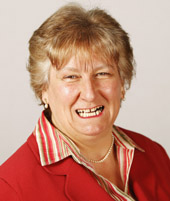
	First party	Second party
Leader	Alex Salmond	Jack McConnell
Party	SNP	Labour
Leader since	3 September 2004	22 November 2001
Last election	181 seats, 24.1%	509 seats, 32.6%
Seats won	363	348
Seat change	▲182	▼161
First preferences	585,885	590,085
First preferences (%)	27.9%	28.1%
Swing (pp)	▲3.8%	▼4.5%
	Third party	Fourth party
Leader	Nicol Stephen	Annabel Goldie
Party	Liberal Democrats	Conservative
Leader since	23 June 2005	8 November 2005
Last election	175 seats, 14.5%	122 seats, 15.1%
Seats won	166	143
Seat change	▼9	▲21
First preferences	266,693	327,591
First preferences (%)	12.7%	15.6%
Swing (pp)	▼1.8%	▲0.5%
- Council controls post elections

- Colours denote the party with the most seats

- Colours denote the party with largest share of first preference votes by ward

The 2007 Scottish local elections were held on 3 May 2007, the same day as Scottish Parliament elections and local elections in parts of England. All 32 Scottish councils had all their seats up for election – all Scottish councils are unitary authorities.

== New electoral system ==
This was the first election for local government in Great Britain to use the single transferable vote (the system is used in Northern Ireland), as implemented by the Local Governance (Scotland) Act 2004. Under the Act, council seats were allocated in ward contests of one, two, three, four or five seats in each. The voter had the right to mark as many or as few preferences as desired.

All in all, 1222 seats were filled using more than 350 separate wards.

The use of Scotland's new electoral system resulted in most councils being under no overall control, a situation in which no single political group achieves a majority of seats.

== eCounting fiasco ==
Scanners supplied by DRS Data Services Limited of Milton Keynes, in partnership with Electoral Reform Services (ERS), the trading arm of the Electoral Reform Society, were used to electronically count the paper ballots in both the Scottish council elections and the Scottish Parliament general election.

Because of the fiasco in 2007 of holding parliamentary (Holyrood) and local elections simultaneously, the following Scottish local elections were held in 2012 instead of 2011.

== Party performance ==
The Labour party lost control of all but two of its councils, Glasgow and North Lanarkshire, but received the largest number of votes, while the SNP were the main beneficiaries of the new voting system, picking up over 180 new seats. The Scottish Greens elected their first-ever councillors, winning eight seats.

== Results ==
Colours denote the winning party with outright control

Summary of the May 2007 Scottish council election results
Party	First-preference votes			Councils		2003 seats		2007 seats		
Party	Count	Of total (%)	Change	Count	Change	Count	Of total (%)	Count	Of total (%)	Change
No overall control	—N/a			27	▲20	—N/a		—N/a		
Labour	590,085	28.1	▼4.5%	2	Steady	—N/a		348	28.5%	▼161
SNP	585,885	27.9	▲3.8%	1	Steady	—N/a		363	29.7%	▲182
Conservative	327,591	15.6	▲0.5%	2	Steady	—N/a		143	11.7%	▲21
Liberal Democrats	266,693	12.7	▼1.8%	0	Steady	—N/a		166	13.6%	▼9
Independent	228,894	10.9	▲0.8%	0	Steady	—N/a		192 (Note: 193 according to the BBC website)	15.7%	▼38
Other	102,897	4.9	▲1.3%	0	Steady	—N/a		10 (Note: 8 Scottish Greens, 1 Scottish Socialist and 1 Solidarity councillor. Separate vote figures not found)	0.8%	▲6
Total	2,099,945	100.0	±0.0	32	Steady	1,222	1,222	1,222	100.00	Steady

== Councils ==
The notional results in the following table are based on a document that John Curtice and Stephen Herbert (Professors at the University of Strathclyde) produced on 3 June 2005, calculating the effect of the introduction of the Single Transferable Vote on the 2003 Scottish local elections.

Council	2003 result	Notional control (based on 2003 results)	2007 result	Details
Aberdeen City	No overall control (LD + Con)	NOC	No overall control (LD + SNP)	Details
Aberdeenshire	No overall control (LD + Ind)	NOC	No overall control (LD + Con)	Details
Angus	SNP	NOC	No overall control (Ind + Con + LD + Lab)	Details
Argyll and Bute	Independent	Independent	No overall control (Ind + SNP)	Details
Clackmannanshire	Labour	NOC	Labour (Lab minority)	Details
Dumfries and Galloway	Labour (Lab minority (Note: Labour minority control. The council was previously run by a coalition of Scottish Liberal Democrats, Independents and the SNP.))	NOC	No overall control (Con + LD)	Details
Dundee City	No overall control (Lab + LD+ Con)	NOC	No overall control (Lab + LD+ Con)	Details
East Ayrshire	Labour	Labour	SNP (SNP minority)	Details
East Dunbartonshire	Liberal Democrats (LD minority (Note: Liberal Democrats lack a majority (LD: 12 councillors; opposition: 12 councillors))	NOC	No overall control (Lab + Con)	Details
East Lothian	Labour	NOC	No overall control (SNP + LD)	Details
East Renfrewshire	No overall control (Lab + LD)	NOC	No overall control (Lab + LD + Ind + Con)	Details
City of Edinburgh	Labour (Lab minority (Note: Labour lacked a majority after by-election loss to the SNP (Lab: 29 councillors; opposition: 29 councillors)))	NOC	No overall control (LD + SNP)	Details
Falkirk	No overall control (SNP + Ind + Con)	NOC	No overall control (Lab + Ind + Con)	Details
Fife	Labour (Lab minority (Note: Labour minority administration))	NOC	No overall control (LD + SNP)	Details
Glasgow City	Labour	Labour	Labour	Details
Highland	Independent	Independent	No overall control (Ind + SNP)	Details
Inverclyde	Liberal Democrats	NOC	Labour (Lab minority)	Details
Midlothian	Labour	NOC	Labour (Lab minority)	Details
Moray	Independent	Independent	No overall control (Ind + Con)	Details
Na h-Eileanan Siar	Independent	Independent	Independent	Details
North Ayrshire	Labour	Labour	Labour (Lab minority)	Details
North Lanarkshire	Labour	Labour	Labour	Details
Orkney	Independent	Independent	Independent	Details
Perth and Kinross	No overall control (SNP + LD + Ind)	NOC	No overall control (SNP + LD)	Details
Renfrewshire	Labour	NOC	No overall control (SNP + LD)	Details
Scottish Borders	No overall control (Ind + Con)	NOC	No overall control (Ind + Con + LD)	Details
Shetland	Independent	Independent	Independent	Details
South Ayrshire	Conservative (Con minority (Note: Conservative control, on a cut of the cards (Con: 15 councillors; opposition: 15 councillors)))	NOC	Conservative (Con minority)	Details
South Lanarkshire	Labour	Labour	Labour (Lab minority)	Details
Stirling	Labour (Lab minority (Note: Labour lacked a majority after by-election loss to the SNP (Lab: 11 councillors; opposition: 11 councillors)))	NOC	Labour (Lab minority)	Details
West Dunbartonshire	Labour	Labour	No overall control (SNP + Ind)	Details
West Lothian	Labour	NOC	No overall control (SNP + Ind)	Details
