= Islands (Scotland) Act 2018 =

Act of the Scottish Parliament

Islands (Scotland) Act 2018 (Note: Section 32.)
- Act of the Scottish Parliament
- Scottish Parliament
- Long title: An Act of the Scottish Parliament to make provision for a national islands plan; to impose duties in relation to island communities on certain public authorities; to make provision about the electoral representation of island communities; and to establish a licensing scheme in respect of marine development adjacent to islands.
- Citation: 2018 asp 12
- Introduced by: Angela Constance
- Territorial extent: Scotland

Dates
- Royal assent: 6 July 2018
- Commencement: various (Note: Section 31.)

Other legislation
- Amends: Scotland Act 1998
- Amended by: Public Health Scotland Order 2019; Consumer (Scotland) Act 2020; Scottish Elections (Reform) Act 2020; Circular Economy (Scotland) Act 2024; Education (Scotland) Act 2025

Status: Amended

History of passage through the Parliament

Text of statute as originally enacted

Revised text of statute as amended

Text of the Islands (Scotland) Act 2018 as in force today (including any amendments) within the United Kingdom, from legislation.gov.uk.

The Islands (Scotland) Act 2018 (asp 12) is an act of the Scottish Parliament which devolves certain powers to the three island councils, and requires Scottish ministers to develop and publish a plan for improvement.

== Background ==
In 2012, Transport Scotland released the first plan for Ferries: the "first comprehensive review of ferries".

On 17 June 2013, leaders of the three island councils launched "Our Islands, Our Future", setting out an agenda for:

- devolution of the Crown Estate including revenues and seabed
- improved connections to the National Grid for wave, tidal, wind energy resources
- new fiscal arrangements to allow the islands to benefit more directly from the harvesting of local resources, including renewable energy and fisheries
- recognition of the three island groups in the Scottish constitutional settlement and within the European governance framework

On 25 July 2013 Scottish Government announced the Lerwick Declaration, which revealed that a ministerial working group would examine the prospect of decentralising power to Shetland, Orkney, and the Western Isles. In June 2014, the Scottish Government released a document describing transferring responsibility for certain policies to the island councils, and making special considerations for the islands in policy-making.

In August 2014, the UK Government released a document describing building transmission lines to the islands and improving postal services, digital connectivity and fuel poverty In November 2014, the UK Government held meetings with the three councils in Edinburgh through the Scotland Office.

In 2015 the Scottish Government called for views on devolution of power to Scotland's islands.

According to the Scotsman, the consultation for the bill would indicate the necessity for "putting the management of island affairs back into the hands of the islanders, investing in the right places and launching campaigns to encourage tourism and immigration to the islands" in order for the bill to be successful.

== Provisions ==
=== National Islands Plans ===
The act defines "island" to ignore artificial structures, such as bridges, and specifies that tidal islands are included through specifying that only the status at high tide counts. John Mason MSP criticised this definition, because Skye had a bridge, but would therefore still be included.

The act requires the Scottish Government to publish a "national islands plan" about how the Scottish ministers are improving outcomes:

- increasing population levels,
- improving and promoting sustainable economic development, environmental wellbeing, health and wellbeing, and community empowerment,
- improving transport services,
- improving digital connectivity,
- reducing fuel poverty,
- ensuring effective management of Crown Estate Scotland
- enhancing biosecurity

In 2019, the first National Islands Plan was published. In 2021, the Scottish Government published an "action plan" on implementation of the plan. In 2022, the Scottish Government released an "implementation route map" for implementing the National Islands Plan. The next plan is to be published in 2025.

=== Island communities impact assessments ===
The act requires Scottish ministers to specifically consider island communities and publish island communities impact assessments. Island communities may request a retrospective island communities impact assessment. The Scottish Government must consult island communities when developing policies that affect the islands.

=== Shetland mapping requirement ===
When publishing in a map of Scotland, Scottish Government bodies must display the Shetland Islands in a manner that accurately and proportionately represents their geographical location in relation to the rest of Scotland.

=== Protection of the Constituency of Na h-Eileanan an Iar ===
The Scottish Parliament constituency of Na h-Eileanan an Iar is given a protected status.

=== Review of wards ===
The Act requires islands to have wards with either one or two members and requires the boundaries of Argyll and Bute Council, Comhairle nan Eilean Siar, Highland Council, North Ayrshire Council, Orkney Islands Council, and Shetland Islands Council to be reviewed by the Local Government Boundary Commission for Scotland.

Certain wards such as Ardrossan and Arran and Kilbirnie and Beith have been abolished and others such as Garnock Valley have been created due to the change in the requirements for boundaries.

=== Marine area licences ===
The Act allows island councils to manage "marine area licences" to manage economic activity in the sea bed.

=== Additional powers requests ===
The act allows island councils to make "additional power requests" under regulations to be published by the Scottish Government – a draft Scottish statutory instrument must be published within one year of the act receiving royal assent, implementing the regulations for these requests.

Additional Powers Request (Scotland) Regulations 2019
- Statutory Instrument
- Scottish Parliament
- Citation: SSI 2019/327

Dates
- Made: 17 October 2019
- Commencement: 18 October 2019

Other legislation
- Made under: Islands (Scotland) Act 2018

Text of statute as originally enacted

The published regulations are the Additional Powers Request (Scotland) Regulations 2019 (SSI 2019/327).

== Further developments ==
The Scottish Greens have supported increasing autonomy for Shetland up to the "Faroese Model".

A conference, planned to be held in April, to discuss autonomy under the act was cancelled.

The report on the implementation of the act was published, and describes the act as providing a "solid policy framework".

The Scottish Government published a classification of the islands to improve data classification to support bespoke arrangements for the islands.

== Reception ==
The Act was described by a co-founder of the "Our Islands Our Future" campaign and former Orkney Islands Council as "potentially very significant." The Act has been positively described academically.

The "island-proofing" Act has been criticised as largely being absent.
