= Local Governance (Scotland) Act 2004 =

Act of the Scottish Parliament

Local Governance (Scotland) Act 2004 (Note: Section 17(1).)
- Act of the Scottish Parliament
- Scottish Parliament
- Long title: An Act of the Scottish Parliament to make provision for the election of councillors by single transferable vote and in relation to candidates to be councillor; to make provision in relation to certain restrictions upon being a councillor and upon former councillors; to make new provision about remuneration for and other payments to councillors; and for connected purposes.
- Citation: 2004 asp 9
- Territorial extent: Scotland

Dates
- Royal assent: 29 July 2004
- Commencement: August 2004 – May 2007 (Note: Section 17(2).)

Other legislation
- Amends: Local Government (Scotland) Act 1973; Local Government etc. (Scotland) Act 1994; Political Parties, Elections and Referendums Act 2000
- Amended by: Local Electoral Administration and Registration Services (Scotland) Act 2006; Scottish Local Government (Elections) Act 2009; Islands (Scotland) Act 2018; Scottish Elections (Reform) Act 2020

Status: Amended

Text of statute as originally enacted

Revised text of statute as amended

Text of the Local Governance (Scotland) Act 2004 as in force today (including any amendments) within the United Kingdom, from legislation.gov.uk.

The Local Governance (Scotland) Act 2004 (asp 9) is an act of the Scottish Parliament which made certain reforms to local government including the introduction of the single transferable vote electoral system.

== Provisions ==
The Commission on Local Government and the Scottish Parliament reported in June 2000. The introduction of proportional representation in local authority elections was a key demand of the Liberal Democrats when they entered into coalition with the Labour Party in the Scottish Executive.

The act reduced the eligibility age for local government elections from 21 to 18, with the goal of increasing diversity among councillors. The act also establishes an independent remuneration committee for councillors. The act changes the rules for local government employees standing for election.

== Reception ==
The passing of the legislation was criticised by the Convention of Scottish Local Authorities due to the fact that most people who responded to the public consultation for the legislation were against the introduction of STV.

== See also ==
- 2007 Scottish local government elections
