= Shetland Islands Council elections =

Local government elections in Shetland Islands, Scotland

Shetland Islands Council in Scotland holds elections every five years, previously holding them every four years from its creation as a single-tier authority in 1995 to 2007.

== Council elections ==
=== As an islands council ===
Year	Labour	Liberal Democrats	Shetland Movement	Independent
1974	4	0	0	18
1978 (Note: New ward boundaries.)	4	0	0	21
1982	2	0	0	23
1986	4	0	5	16
1990	1	0	7	17 (Note: Includes 1 Independent Labour.)
1994 (Note: New ward boundaries.)	1	2	6	17

=== As a unitary authority ===
Year	Green	Labour	SNP	Liberal Democrats	Independent
1999	0	0	0	9	13 (Note: Includes 1 Independent Liberal.)
2003	0	0	0	5	17
2007 (Note: Change to single transferable vote system and new ward boundaries.)	0	0	0	0	22
2012	0	0	0	0	22
2017 (Note: New ward boundaries.)	0	0	1	0	21
2022 (Note: New ward boundaries.)	1	1	1	0	20 (Note: Includes 1 seat vacant through insufficient nominations, filled at a by-election on 4 August.)

== Results maps ==
1978 results map

1982 results map

1986 results map

1990 results map

1999 results map

2003 results map

2007 results map

2012 results map

2017 results map

2022 results map

== By-elections ==
=== 2007-2012 ===
Lerwick South By-Election 28 February 2008
Party	Candidate	FPv%	Count						
Party	Candidate	FPv%	1	2	3	4	5	6	7
Independent	Jonathan Wills	25.1	332	335	350	361	402	462	576
Independent	Peter Campbell	17.6	233	240	246	272	317	370	465
Independent	Lyle Williamson	17.2	228	229	234	245	286	337	
Independent	Robbie Leith	13.8	183	188	204	216	228		
Conservative	Maurice Mullay	12.8	169	171	177	199			
Independent	Geoff Feather	6.6	87	91	96				
Independent	Larry Deyell	4.8	63	66					
Independent	Vic Thomas	2.2	29						
Independent hold									
Electorate: 3,382 Valid: 1,324 Spoilt: 7 Quota: 663 Turnout: 1,331

Shetland Central By-Election 15 December 2011
Party	Candidate	FPv%	Count	
Party	Candidate	FPv%	1	2
Independent	David Sandison	48.4	332	352
Independent	Stephen Morgan	16.9	116	124
Independent	Ian Scott	15.6	107	115
Independent	Robert Williamson	10.9	75	81
Conservative	Clive Richardson	4.2	29	
Independent	Scotty van der Tol	3.9	27	
Independent hold				
Electorate: 2,300 Valid: 686 Spoilt: 4 Quota: 344 Turnout: 690

=== 2022-2027 ===
North Isles By-Election 4 August 2022
Party	Candidate	FPv%	Count
Party	Candidate	FPv%	1
Independent	Robert Thomson	68.6	680
Independent	Sonia Robertson	10.7	106
Independent	Gary Cleaver	10.1	100
Independent	Marie Williamson	9.3	92
Independent	Stewart Douglas	1.3	13
Independent gain from vacancy			
Valid: 991 Spoilt: 6 Quota: 496 Turnout: 997

Shetland West By-Election 17 November 2022
Party	Candidate	FPv%	Count
Party	Candidate	FPv%	1
Independent	Mark Robinson	76.4	375
Green	Debra Nicolson	13.6	67
SNP	Zara Pennington	10.0	49
Independent hold			
Valid: 491 Spoilt: 2 Quota: 246 Turnout: 493

Shetland North By-Election 23 January 2025
Party	Candidate	FPv%	Count
Party	Candidate	FPv%	1
Independent	Andrew Hall	90.4	887
Independent	Natasha Cornick	9.6	94
Independent gain from Labour			
Valid: 981 Spoilt: 5 Quota: 492 Turnout: 986
