= Shetland Islands (Scottish Parliament constituency) =

Constituency of the Scottish Parliament

- County constituency for the Scottish Parliament
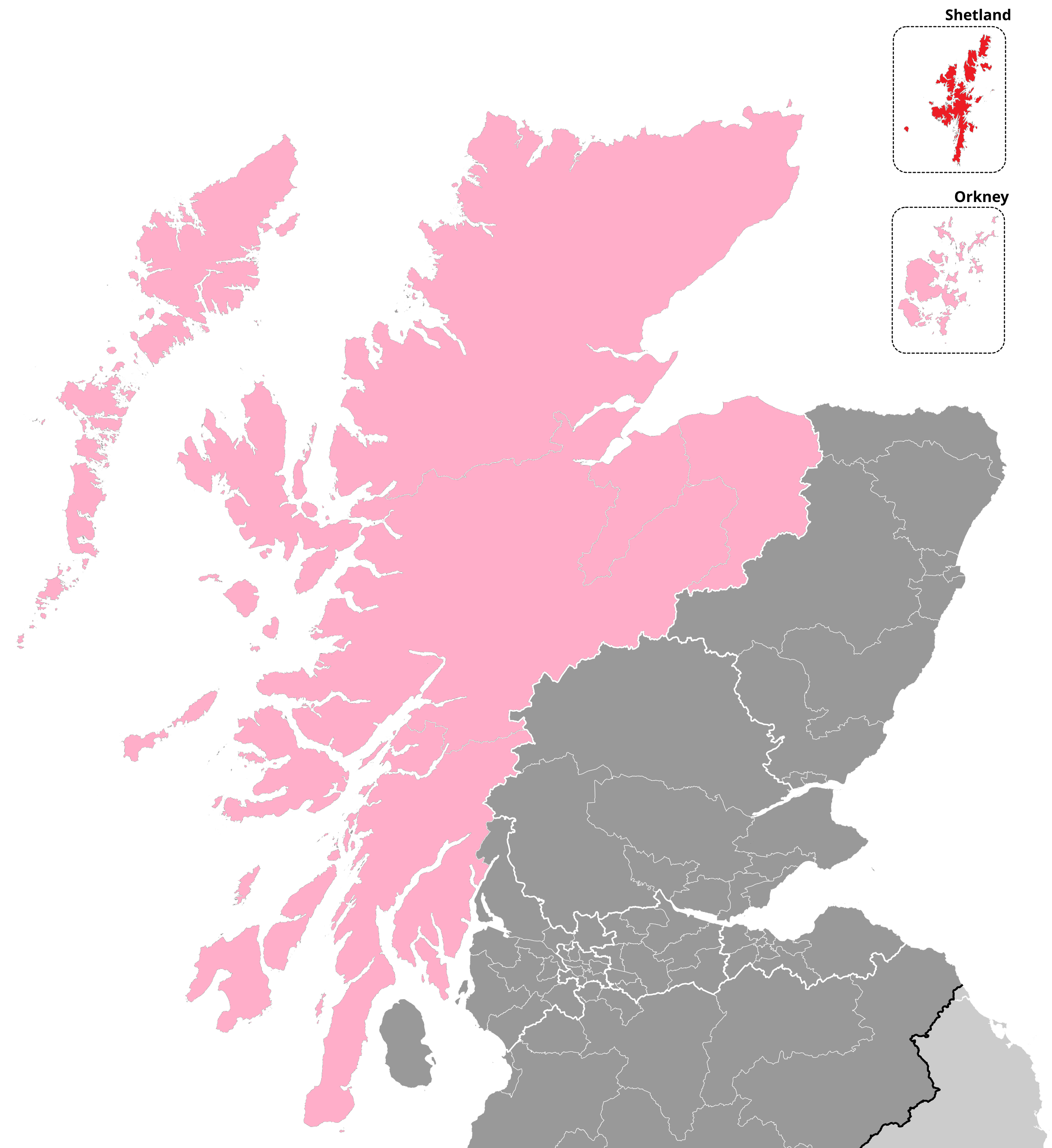

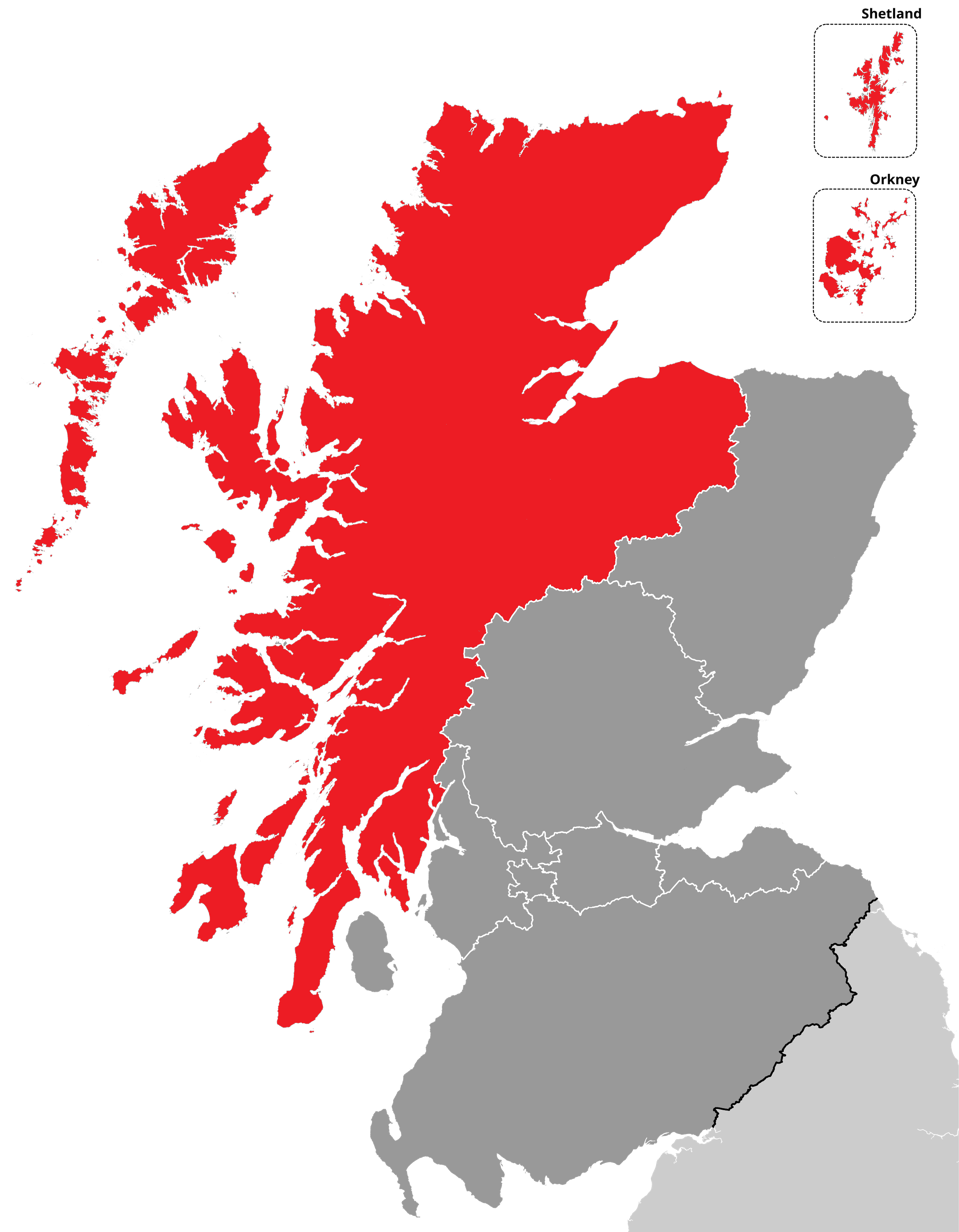
- Shetland Islands shown within the Highlands and Islands electoral region, and the region shown within Scotland
- Electoral region: Highlands and Islands
- Population: 23,190 (2024)
- Electorate: 17,979 (2026)

Current constituency
- Created: 1999
- Party: Scottish National Party
- MSP: Hannah Mary Goodlad
- Local council: Shetland Islands

Shetland Islands is a county constituency of the Scottish Parliament covering the council area of Shetland. It elects one Member of the Scottish Parliament (MSP) by the first past the post method of election. Under the additional-member electoral system used for elections to the Scottish Parliament, it is also one of eight constituencies in the Highlands and Islands electoral region, which elects seven additional members, in addition to the eight constituency MSPs, to produce a form of proportional representation for the region as a whole.

The Shetland Islands constituency had been held by the Liberal Democrats since the formation of the Scottish Parliament in 1999, until the current MSP Hannah Goodlad won the seat for the SNP in 2026. She succeeded previous MSP Beatrice Wishart, who won the seat at a 2019 by-election held following the resignation of former party leader Tavish Scott.

== Electoral region ==
The Shetland Islands constituency forms part of the Highlands and Islands electoral region; the other seven constituencies are: Argyll and Bute, Caithness, Sutherland and Ross, Inverness and Nairn, Moray, Na h-Eileanan an Iar, Orkney Islands and Skye, Lochaber and Badenoch.

The region covers most of Argyll and Bute council area, all of the Highland council area, most of the Moray council area, all of the Orkney Islands council area, all of the Shetland Islands council area and all of Na h-Eileanan Siar.

== Constituency boundaries and council area ==
The Shetland Islands constituency was created at the same time as the Scottish Parliament, for the 1999 Scottish Parliament election, and covers the Shetland Isles council area. The constituency is protected in law due to its geographical separation from other parts of Scotland, and therefore its boundaries are not subject to review. It contains all seven of the Shetland Council wards: North Isles; Shetland North; Shetland West; Shetland Central; Shetland South; Lerwick North; Lerwick South.

In the House of Commons of the British Parliament, Shetland is covered by the Orkney and Shetland constituency, which also covers Orkney.

== Member of the Scottish Parliament ==
The seat was represented by Tavish Scott, former Scottish Liberal Democrats leader, from the 1999 election until he stood down in June 2019. The subsequent by-election was won by Beatrice Wishart, who held the seat for the Liberal Democrats.

Election	Member	Party
1999	Tavish Scott	Liberal Democrats
2019 by-election	Beatrice Wishart	Liberal Democrats
2026	Hannah Mary Goodlad	Scottish National Party

== Election results ==
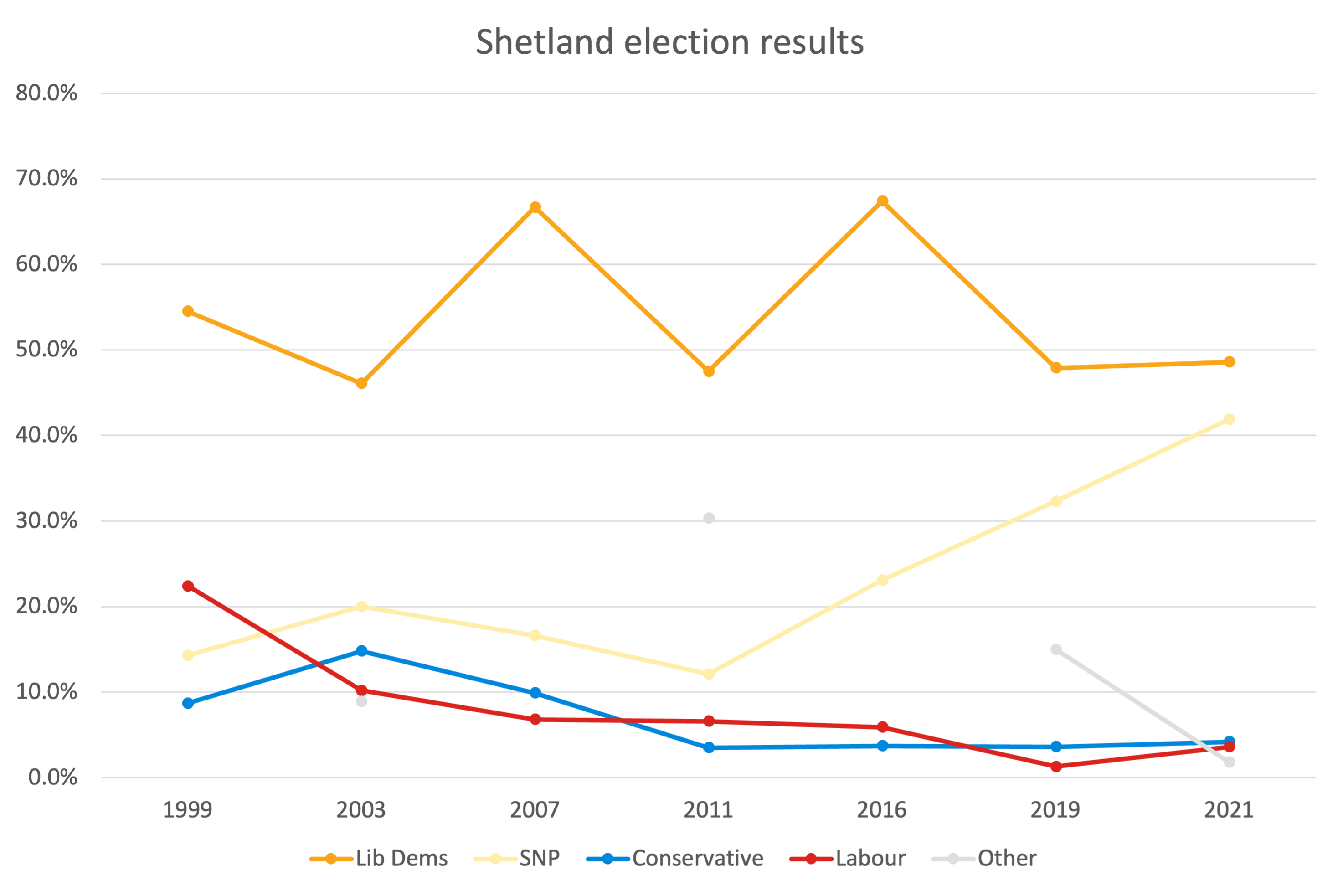
Shetland election results 1999-2021

=== 2020s ===
2026 Scottish Parliament election: Shetland Islands
Party	Candidate	Constituency			Regional		
Party	Candidate	Votes	%	±%	Votes	%	±%
SNP	Hannah Mary Goodlad	5,453	47.5	▲5.6	3,099	27.0	▼7.5
Liberal Democrats	Emma MacDonald	3,936	34.3	▼14.3	3,508	30.6	▲4.1
Green	Alex Armitage	949	8.3	New	1,852	16.2	▲6.5
Reform	Vic Currie (Note: Elected on the party list)	725	6.3	New	1,310	11.4	▲10.9
Labour	John Erskine	169	1.5	▼2.1	620	5.4	▼3.0
Conservative	Douglas Barnett	137	1.2	▼3.0	546	4.8	▼10.9
Independent Green Voice					135	1.2	New
Scottish Family					93	0.8	0.0
Sovereignty / Alliance to Liberate Scotland	Brian Nugent	65	0.6	New			
AtLS					52	0.5	New
Independent	Peter Tait	50	0.4	▼0.6			
Independent	Duncan MacPherson				39	0.3	N/A
Scottish Christian					38	0.3	New
ISP					37	0.3	New
Scottish Libertarian					32	0.3	▼0.1
Scottish Socialist					29	0.3	New
Scottish Rural Party					24	0.2	New
Workers Party					24	0.2	New
Advance UK					12	0.1	New
Independent	Mick Rice				11	0.1	N/A
Majority		1,517	13.2	▲6.5			
Valid votes		11,484			11,461		
Invalid votes		51			63		
Turnout		11,535	64.2	▼1.8	11,524	64.1	▼1.7
SNP gain from Liberal Democrats		Swing					
Notes

2021 Scottish Parliament election: Shetland Islands (Note: Showing changes from 2016 general election.)
Party	Candidate	Constituency			Regional		
Party	Candidate	Votes	%	±%	Votes	%	±%
Liberal Democrats	Beatrice Wishart (Note: Incumbent member for this constituency)	5,803	48.6	▼18.8	3,157	26.5	▼9.1
SNP	Tom Wills	4,997	41.9	▲18.8	4,108	34.5	▲7.9
Conservative	Nick Tulloch	503	4.2	▲0.5	1,865	15.7	▲4.8
Green					1,154	9.7	▲3.0
Labour	Martin Kerr	424	3.6	▼2.3	1,003	8.4	▼0.7
Independent	Peter Tait	116	1.0	New			
Alba					104	0.9	New
Scottish Family					93	0.8	New
Independent	Andy Wightman (Note: Incumbent member on the list for Lothian region, having been elected as a member of the Scottish Greens in 2016)				70	0.6	New
All for Unity					60	0.5	New
Reform					57	0.5	New
Restore Scotland	Brian Nugent	90	0.8	New	53	0.4	New
Abolish the Scottish Parliament					49	0.4	New
Scottish Libertarian					48	0.4	New
UKIP					38	0.3	▼2.4
TUSC					25	0.2	New
Freedom Alliance (UK)					13	0.1	New
Independent	Hazel Mansfield				9	0.1	New
Majority		806	6.7	▼37.6			
Valid votes		11,933			11,906		
Invalid votes		35			30		
Turnout		11,968	66.0	▲3.7	11,936	65.8	▲3.5
Liberal Democrats hold		Swing		▼18.8			

=== 2010s ===
2019 Shetland Islands by-election
Party	Candidate	Votes	%	±%
Liberal Democrats	Beatrice Wishart	5,659	47.9	▼19.5
SNP	Tom Wills	3,822	32.3	▲9.2
Independent	Ryan Thomson	1,286	10.9	New
Conservative	Brydon Goodlad	425	3.6	▼0.1
Green	Debra Nicolson	189	1.6	New
Labour	Johan Adamson	152	1.3	▼4.6
Independent	Michael Stout	134	1.1	New
Independent	Ian Scott	66	0.6	New
UKIP	Stuart Martin	60	0.5	New
Independent	Peter Tait	31	0.3	New
Majority		1,837	15.6	▼28.7
Total valid votes		11,824		
Rejected ballots		11		
Turnout		11,835	66.5	▲4.2
Liberal Democrats hold		Swing	▼14.4	

2016 Scottish Parliament election: Shetland Islands
Party	Candidate	Constituency			Regional		
Party	Candidate	Votes	%	±%	Votes	%	±%
Liberal Democrats	Tavish Scott (Note: Incumbent member for this constituency)	7,440	67.4	▲19.9	3,937	35.7	▲3.8
SNP	Danus Skene	2,545	23.1	▲11.0	2,932	26.6	▼2.2
Labour	Robina Barton	651	5.9	▼0.7	1,003	9.1	▼1.4
Conservative	Cameron Smith	405	3.7	▲0.2	1,197	10.8	▲4.5
Green					736	6.7	▼0.8
Independent	James Stockan				701	6.3	New
UKIP					301	2.7	▼1.2
Scottish Christian					116	1.1	▼1.0
RISE					85	0.8	New
Solidarity					33	0.3	▲0.1
Majority		4,895	44.3	▲27.1			
Valid votes		11,041			11,041		
Invalid votes		46			46		
Turnout		11,087	62.3	▲8.5	11,087	62.3	▲8.5
Liberal Democrats hold		Swing		▲15.5			
Notes

2011 Scottish Parliament election: Shetland Islands
Party	Candidate	Constituency			Regional		
Party	Candidate	Votes	%	±%	Votes	%	±%
Liberal Democrats	Tavish Scott (Note: Incumbent member for this constituency)	4,462	47.5	▼19.2	2,975	31.9	
Independent	Billy Fox	2,845	30.3	New			
SNP	Jean Urquhart	1,134	12.1	▼4.5	2,688	28.8	
Labour	Jamie Kerr	620	6.6	▼0.2	974	10.4	
Conservative	Sandy Cross	330	3.5	▼6.4	595	6.4	
Green					699	7.5	
UKIP					362	3.9	
Liberal					319	3.4	
Scottish Christian					196	2.1	
All Scotland Pensioners Party					170	1.8	
Ban Bankers Bonuses					153	1.6	
BNP					66	0.7	
Socialist Labour					65	0.7	
Scottish Socialist					57	0.6	
Solidarity					15	0.2	
Majority		1,617	17.2	▼32.9			
Valid votes		9,391			9,334		
Invalid votes		37			83		
Turnout		9,428	53.9	▼3.4	9,417	53.9	
Liberal Democrats hold		Swing		▼7.4			

=== 2000s ===
2007 Scottish Parliament election: Shetland Islands
Party	Candidate	Votes	%	±%
Liberal Democrats	Tavish Scott	6,531	66.7	+20.6
SNP	Val Simpson	1,622	16.6	−3.4
Conservative	Mark Jones	972	9.9	−4.9
Labour	Scott Burnett	670	6.8	−3.4
Majority		4,409	50.1	+24.0
Turnout		9,795	57.3	+5.5
Liberal Democrats hold		Swing	+12.1	

Scottish Parliament Election 2003: Shetland Islands
Party	Candidate	Votes	%	±%
Liberal Democrats	Tavish Scott	3,989	46.1	−8.4
SNP	Willie Ross	1,729	20.0	+5.7
Conservative	John Firth	1,281	14.8	+6.1
Labour	Peter Hamilton	880	10.2	−12.3
Scottish Socialist	Peter Andrews	766	8.9	New
Majority		2,260	26.1	−6.0
Turnout		8,645	51.8	−6.5
Liberal Democrats hold		Swing	-7.0	

=== 1990s ===
Scottish Parliament Election 1999: Shetland Islands
Party	Candidate	Votes	%	±%
Liberal Democrats	Tavish Scott	5,455	54.5	N/A
Labour	Jonathan Wills	2,241	22.4	N/A
SNP	Willie Ross	1,430	14.3	N/A
Conservative	Gary Robinson	872	8.7	N/A
Majority		3,214	32.1	N/A
Turnout		9,998	58.3	N/A
Liberal Democrats win (new seat)				
