= Lerwick North and Bressay (ward) =

Shetland Islands ward electing three Councillors

Location of the ward

Lerwick North and Bressay (previously called Lerwick North between 2007 and 2022), is one of the seven wards used to elect members of the Shetland Islands Council. It elects three Councillors.

== Councillors ==
Election	Councillors		
2007	Alan Wishart	Sandy Cluness	Caroline Miller
2012	Alan Wishart	Malcolm Bell	Michael Stout
2017	Stephen Leask	Malcolm Bell	John Fraser
2022	Stephen Leask	Gary Robinson	Arwed Wenger

== Election results ==
=== 2022 election ===
Lerwick North and Bressay - 3 seats
Party	Candidate	FPv%	Count				
Party	Candidate	FPv%	1	2	3	4	5
Independent	Stephen Leask (incumbent)	33.4	310				
Independent	Gary Robinson	32.4	301				
Independent	Arwed Wenger	14.7	136	164	189	220	312
Independent	Marie Williamson	12.4	115	133	146	173	
Independent	Stephen Ferguson	7.1	66	79	92		
Electorate: 2,410 Valid: 928 Spoilt: 13 Quota: 233 Turnout: 39.0%

=== 2017 election ===
2017 Shetland Islands Council election

Lerwick North - 3 seats
Party	Candidate	FPv%	Count		
Party	Candidate	FPv%	1	2	3
Independent	Malcolm Bell (incumbent)	71.9	715		
Independent	Stephen Leask	13.2	130	337.25	
Independent	John Fraser	12.4	124	243.92	287.73
Conservative	Thomas Williamson	2.6	26	54.68	68.93

=== 2012 election ===
2012 Shetland Islands Council election

Lerwick North - 3 seats
Party	Candidate	FPv%	Count						
Party	Candidate	FPv%	1	2	3	4	5	6	7
Independent	Malcolm Bell	55.93	684						
Independent	Michael Stout	16.93	207	350.3					
Independent	Allan Wishart (incumbent)	12.02	147	230.9	236.7	258.9	273.4	295.8	348.8
SNP	Danus Skene	5.31	65	98.3	102.5	109.3	122.8	142.9	
Independent	Alex Wright	3.76	46	74.3	86.4	88.2	105.1		
Independent	Caroline Miller (incumbent)	2.86	35	51.1	53.3				
Independent	Bill Adams	2.29	28	64.1	75.8	83.3			
Electorate: 2,453 Valid: 1,212 Spoilt: 11 Quota: 304 Turnout: 1,223 (49.86%)

=== 2007 election ===
2007 Shetland Islands Council election

Shetland Islands council election, 2007: Lerwick North
Party	Candidate	FPv%	%	Seat	Count
Independent	Allan Wishart	505	39.2	1	1
Independent	Sandy Cluness	264	20.5	2	3
Independent	Caroline Miller	206	16.0	3	5
Independent	Bill Adams	125	9.7		
Scottish Socialist	Kin Learmonth	110	8.6		
Independent	Kathy Greaves	79	6.1		
