= Shetland Central (ward) =

Location of the ward

Shetland Central is one of the seven wards used to elect members of the Shetland Islands Council. It elects three Councillors.

== Councillors ==
Election	Councillors			
2007	Iris Hawkins	Andrew Hughson	Betty Fullerton	3 seats
2011 by-	David Sandison	Andrew Hughson	Betty Fullerton	3 seats
2012	David Sandison	Vaila Wishart	Mark Burgess	3 seats
2017	David Sandison	Ian Scott	Mark Burgess	3 seats
2019 by-	David Sandison	Ian Scott	Moraig Lyall	3 seats
2022	David Sandison	Ian Scott	Moraig Lyall	Catherine Hughson

== Election results ==
=== 2022 election ===
Shetland Central - 4 seats
Party	Candidate	FPv%	Count	
Party	Candidate	FPv%	1	2
Independent	Moraig Lyall (incumbent)	29.3	414	
Independent	Davie Sandison (incumbent)	22.8	322	
Independent	Catherine Hughson (Note: Sitting councillor for Shetland West.)	19.9	282	339
Independent	Ian Scott (incumbent)	19.2	271	308
Green	Martin Randall	7.0	99	116
Sovereignty	Brian Nugent	1.8	26	29
Electorate: 3,168 Valid: 1,414 Spoilt: 8 Quota: 283 Turnout: 44.9%

=== 2019 by-election ===
Shetland Central By-election (7 November 2019)
Party	Candidate	FPv%	Count
Party	Candidate	FPv%	1
Independent	Moraig Lyall	47.0	344
Independent	Julie Buchan	15.8	116
SNP	Stewart Douglas	15.2	111
Independent	Gordon Laverie	11.5	84
Independent	Johan Adamson	10.5	77
Turnout: 732 (31.0%)

=== 2017 election ===
2017 Shetland Islands Council election

Shetland Central - 3 seats
Party	Candidate	FPv%	Count			
Party	Candidate	FPv%	1	2	3	4
Independent	Davie Sandison (incumbent)	32.9	320			
Independent	Mark Burgess (incumbent)	26.7	260			
Independent	Ian Scott	19.6	191	214.04	217.18	263.52
Independent	Julie Buchan	12.1	118	139.61	146.87	169.40
Independent Nationalist	Brian Nugent	8.6	84	93.26	95.79	

=== 2012 election ===
2012 Shetland Islands Council election

Shetland Central - 3 seats
Party	Candidate	FPv%	Count				
Party	Candidate	FPv%	1	2	3	4	5
Independent	Davie Sandison (incumbent)	35.92	375				
Independent	Vaila Wishart	25.57	267				
Independent	Ian Scott	13.89	145	162.2	163.7	171.8	190.2
Independent	Mark Burgess	13.70	143	193.9	196.8	221.1	259
Independent	John Hunter	4.79	50	74.3	76.8	81.5	
Scottish Christian	Peter Jamieson	4.60	48	52.7	53.1		
Electorate: 2,284 Valid: 1,028 Spoilt: 16 Quota: 258 Turnout: 1,044 (45.71%)

=== 2007 election ===
2007 Shetland Islands Council election

Shetland Islands council election, 2007: Shetland Central
Party	Candidate	FPv%	%	Seat	Count
Independent	Iris Hawkins	330	27.2	1	1
Independent	Andrew Hughson	311	25.6	2	1
Independent	Betty Fullerton	257	21.2	3	7
Independent	Ian Scott	131	10.8		
Independent	Geordie Pottinger	98	8.1		
Independent	John Hunter	46	3.8		
Independent	Jim Ivens	23	1.9		
Independent	Scotty Dyble	19	1.6		
