= Lerwick South (ward) =

Location of the ward

Lerwick South is one of the seven wards used to elect members of the Shetland Islands Council. It elects four Councillors.

== Councillors ==
Election	Councillors			
2007	Cecil Eunson	Gussie Angus	Cecil Smith	Jim Henry
2008 by-	Jonathan Willis	Gussie Angus	Cecil Smith	Jim Henry
2012	Jonathan Willis	Peter Campbell	Cecil Smith	Amanda Westlake
2017	Beatrice Wishart	Peter Campbell	Cecil Smith	Amanda Westlake
2019 by-	Stephen Flaws	Peter Campbell	Cecil Smith	Amanda Westlake
2022	John Fraser	Neil Pearson	Cecil Smith	Dennis Leask

== Election results ==
=== 2022 election ===
Lerwick South - 4 seats
Party	Candidate	FPv%	Count					
Party	Candidate	FPv%	1	2	3	4	5	6
Independent	Dennis Leask	22.5	302					
Independent	John Fraser (Note: Sitting councillor for Lerwick North.)	19.5	262	268	289			
Independent	Cecil Smith (incumbent)	18.4	251	257	275			
Independent	Neil Pearson	12.7	171	177	206	213	215	281
Independent	Amanda Hawick (incumbent)	11.4	153	156	168	173	176	208
Independent	Peter Coleman	7.8	106	109	120	123	125	
Independent	Shayne Mcleod	7.4	99	102				
Electorate: 3,036 Valid: 1,344 Spoilt: 17 Quota: 269 Turnout: 44.8%

=== 2017 election ===
2017 Shetland Islands Council election

Lerwick South - 4 seats
Party	Candidate	FPv%	Count			
Party	Candidate	FPv%	1	2	3	4
Independent	Cecil Smith (incumbent)	28.8	429			
Independent	Beatrice Wishart†	26.4	394			
Independent	Peter Campbell (incumbent)	20.0	299			
Independent	Amanda Westlake (incumbent)	12.7	190	242.42	271.12	408.83
Independent	Frances Valente	12.1	180	220.61	268.35	

=== 2012 election ===
2012 Shetland Islands Council election

Lerwick South - 4 seats
Party	Candidate	FPv%	Count					
Party	Candidate	FPv%	1	2	3	4	5	6
Independent	Dr Jonathan Wills (incumbent)	36.07	646					
Independent	Cecil Smith (incumbent)	17.81	319	407.3				
Independent	Peter Campbell	14.46	259	310.4	329.9	349.9	388.9	
Independent	Amanda Westlake	12.79	229	280.8	291.9	308.6	346.5	358.9
Independent	Robbie Leith	8.04	144	184.9	188.1	204.6	241.4	248.9
SNP	Iain Morrison	6.64	119	144.7	148.7	157.3		
Independent	Jim Henry (incumbent)	3.24	58	71.1	78.9			
Electorate: 3,507 Valid: 1,774 Spoilt: 11 Quota: 355 Turnout: 1,791 (51.07%)

=== 2007 election ===
2007 Shetland Islands Council election

Shetland Islands council election, 2007: Lerwick South
Party	Candidate	FPv%	%	Seat	Count
Independent	Cecil Eunson	489	26.4	1	1
Independent	Gussie Angus	473	25.6	2	1
Independent	Cecil Smith	199	10.8	3	7
Conservative	Maurice Mullay	159	8.6		
Scottish Socialist	Robbie Leith	150	8.1		
Independent	Jim Henry	127	6.9	4	8
Independent	Michael Peterson	116	6.3		
Independent	Geoff Feather	97	5.2		
Independent	Lindsay Smith	40	2.2		
