= Shetland South (ward) =

Location of the ward

Shetland South is one of the seven wards used to elect members of the Shetland Islands Council. It elects three Councillors.

== Councillors ==
Election	Councillors			
2007	Alison Duncan	Jim Budge	Rick Nickerson	
2012	Alison Duncan	George Smith	Billy Fox	
2017	Alison Duncan	George Smith	Robbie McGregor	
2022	Alison Duncan	Bryan Peterson	Robbie McGregor	Alex Armitage (Greens)

== Election results ==
=== 2022 election ===
Shetland South - 4 seats
Party	Candidate	FPv%	Count			
Party	Candidate	FPv%	1	2	3	4
Independent	Allison Duncan (incumbent)	42.7	805			
Independent	Bryan Peterson	27.1	500			
Green	Alex Armitage	14.8	274	325	360	405
SNP	Robbie McGregor (incumbent)	11.8	217	326	364	401
Independent	Stewart Douglas	2.5	46	169	197	
Electorate: 3,348 Valid: 1,842 Spoilt: 14 Quota: 369 Turnout: 55.4%

=== 2017 election ===
2017 Shetland Islands Council election

Shetland South - 3 seats
Party	Candidate	FPv%	Count
Party	Candidate	FPv%	1
Independent	Allison Duncan (incumbent)	uncontested	uncontested
SNP	Robbie McGregor	uncontested	uncontested
Independent	George Smith (incumbent)	uncontested	uncontested

=== 2012 election ===
2012 Shetland Islands Council election

Shetland South - 3 seats
Party	Candidate	FPv%	Count	
Party	Candidate	FPv%	1	2
Independent	Alison Duncan (incumbent)	45.15	685	
Independent	George Smith	27.55	418	
Independent	Billy Fox	22.21	337	498.8
Scottish Christian	Andrew Shearer	4.48	68	110.6
Electorate: 2,679 Valid: 1,508 Spoilt: 9 Quota: 378 Turnout: 1,517 (56.63%)

=== 2007 election ===
2007 Shetland Islands Council election

Shetland Islands council election, 2007: Shetland South
Party	Candidate	FPv%	%	Seat	Count
Independent	Alison Duncan	501	31.6	1	1
Independent	Jim Budge	350	22.1	2	4
Independent	Rick Nickerson	286	18.0	3	4
Liberal Democrats	Gordon Mitchell	225	14.2		
Independent	John Hunter	148	9.3		
Liberal Democrats	James Friedlander	75	4.5		
