= Shetland West (ward) =

Location of the ward

Shetland West is one of the seven wards used to elect members of the Shetland Islands Council. It elects three Councillors.

== Councillors ==
Election	Councillors		
2007	Frank Robertson	Gary Robinson	Florence Grains
2012	Frank Robertson	Gary Robinson	Theo Smith
2017	Catherine Hughson	Steven Coutts	Theo Smith
2022	Liz Boxwell	John Leask	2 seats
2023	Liz Boxwell	Mark Robinson	2 seats

== Election results ==
=== 2022 by-election ===
Shetland West by-election (17 November 2022) - 1 seat
Party	Candidate	FPv%	Count
Party	Candidate	FPv%	1
Independent	Mark Robinson	76.4	375
Green	Debra Nicolson	13.6	67
SNP	Zara Pennington	10.0	49
Electorate: 1,350 Valid: 491 Spoilt: 2 Quota: 246 Turnout: 36.5%

=== 2022 election ===
Shetland West - 2 seats
Party	Candidate	FPv%	Count							
Party	Candidate	FPv%	1	2	3	4	5	6	7	8
Independent	Liz Boxwell	39.3	298							
Independent	John Leask	17.8	135	154	154	158	171	178	205	298
Independent	Mark Robinson	16.9	128	142	143	150	164	170	198	
Green	Debra Nicolson	9.1	69	70	71	71	81	118		
SNP	Zara Pennington	7.8	59	60	61	61	64			
Independent	Andrew Holt	5.7	43	46	47	50				
Independent	Ian Tinkler	2.8	21	21	21					
Independent	Peter Fraser	0.7	5	6						
Electorate: 1,364 Valid: 758 Spoilt: 13 Quota: 253 Turnout: 56.5%

=== 2017 election ===
2017 Shetland Islands Council election

Shetland West - 3 seats
Party	Candidate	FPv%	Count			
Party	Candidate	FPv%	1	2	3	4
Independent	Theo Smith (incumbent)	42.5	521			
Independent	Catherine Hughson	15.8	194	255.61	274.72	320.47
Independent	Gary Robinson (incumbent)	14.6	179	204.47	209.29	217.57
Independent	Steven Coutts (incumbent)	14.3	175	251.40	275.92	325.47
Independent	Debra Nicolson	6.6	81	107.29	132.81	
Independent	Ian Tinkler	6.1	75	90.61		

=== 2012 election ===
2012 Shetland Islands Council election

Shetland West - 3 seats
Party	Candidate	FPv%	Count						
Party	Candidate	FPv%	1	2	3	4	5	6	7
Independent	Theo Smith	36.97	481						
Independent	Gary Robinson (incumbent)	27.59	359						
Independent	Tom MacIntyre	8.99	117	142.1	148.1	166.6	183.3	206.9	
Independent	Frank Robertson (incumbent)	8.61	112	160.3	163.6	187.4	216.3	269.9	381.3
Independent	Ian Tinkler	5.99	78	107	112.9	127.9	167.8		
Independent	Andy Holt	5.92	77	103.8	109.6	126.8			
Independent	Marion Hughson	5.23	68	85.6	91.3				
Electorate: 2,033 Valid: 1,292 Spoilt: 9 Quota: 324 Turnout: 1,301 (63.99%)

=== 2007 election ===
2007 Shetland Islands Council election

Shetland Islands council election, 2007: Shetland West
Party	Candidate	FPv%	%	Seat	Count
Independent	Frank Robertson	384	31.6	1	1
Independent	Gary Robinson	289	23.8	1	2
Independent	Florence Grains	245	20.1	3	4
Independent	Brian Anderson	174	14.3		
Independent	Marion Hughson	124	10.2		
