= Shetland North (ward) =

Location of the ward

Shetland North is one of the seven wards used to elect members of the Shetland Islands Council. It elects three Councillors.

== Councillors ==
Election	Councillors		
2007	Alastair Cooper	Addie Doull	Bill Manson
2012	Alastair Cooper	Andrea Manson	Drew Ratter
2017	Alastair Cooper	Andrea Manson	Emma Macdonald
2022	Tom Morton (Labour)	Andrea Manson	Emma Macdonald

== Election results ==
=== 2025 by-election ===
Shetland North by-election (23 January 2025) - 1 seat
Party	Candidate	FPv%	Count
Party	Candidate	FPv%	1
Independent	Andrew Hall	90.4	887
Independent	Natasha Cornick	9.6	94
Electorate: 2,490 Turnout: 39.6%

=== 2022 election ===
Shetland North - 3 seats
Party	Candidate	Votes	%
Independent	Emma MacDonald	Unopposed	
Independent	Andrea Manson	Unopposed	
Labour	Tom Morton	Unopposed	
Registered electors			

=== 2017 election ===
2017 Shetland Islands Council election

Shetland North - 3 seats
Party	Candidate	FPv%	Count	
Party	Candidate	FPv%	1	2
Independent	Andrea Manson (incumbent)	42.7	509	
Independent	Alastair Cooper (incumbent)	33.1	395	
Independent	Emma Macdonald	20.1	240	379.04
Conservative	Isobel Johnson	4.0	48	70.28

=== 2012 election ===
2012 Shetland Islands Council election

Shetland North - 3 seats
Party	Candidate	FPv%	Count						
Party	Candidate	FPv%	1	2	3	4	5	6	7
Independent	Andrea Manson	30.79	444						
Independent	Alastair Cooper (incumbent)	23.99	346	369.9					
Independent	Drew Ratter	17.82	257	274	279.4	283.5	299.5	345.4	421.3
Independent	Davy Cooper	11.93	172	182.3	184.3	191.2	209.9	257.9	
Independent	Jim Reyner	8.25	119	129.9	130.8	141.4	153.9		
Independent	Alan MacDonald	4.09	59	65.7	66.7	72.7			
Independent	Colin Arnot	2.50	36	40.4	40.8				
Electorate: 2,488 Valid: 1,433 Spoilt: 9 Quota: 359 Turnout: 1,442 (57.96%)

=== 2007 election ===
2007 Shetland Islands Council election

Shetland Islands council election, 2007: Shetland North
Party	Candidate	FPv%	%	Seat	Count
Independent	Alastair Cooper	438	31.6	1	1
Independent	Addie Doull	215	15.5	2	6
Independent	Bill Manson	214	15.5	3	6
Independent	Barbara Cheyne	186	13.4		
Independent	Kenny Hughson	135	9.6		
Independent	Alan MacDonald	82	5.9		
Independent	Daniel Robertson	68	4.9		
Independent	Joan Easten	46	3.3		
