= 2022 Shetland Islands Council election =

Shetland Islands Council election

- 5 May 2022

All 23 seats to Shetland Islands Council 12 seats needed for a majority
- Registered: 13,325
- Turnout: 47.6% (Note: Excludes uncontested wards.)
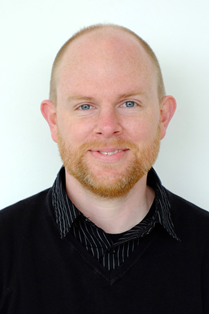

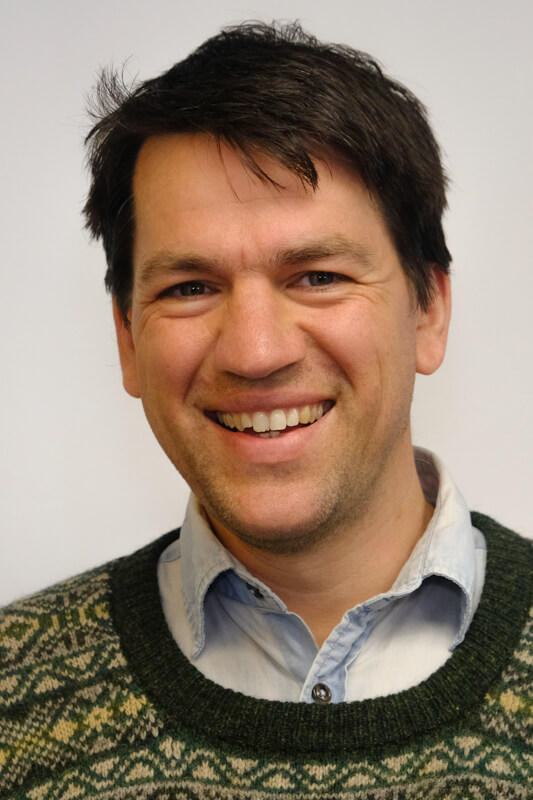

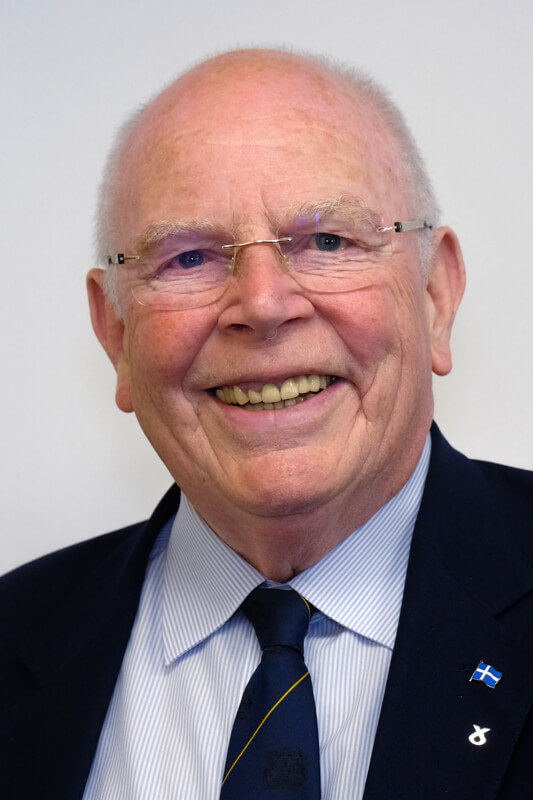

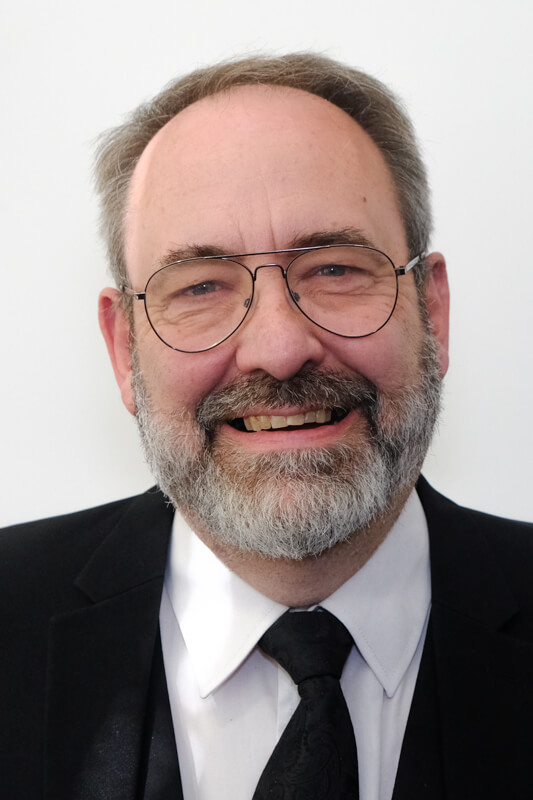
	First party	Second party
Leader	Steven Coutts	Alex Armitage
Party	Independent	Green
Leader's seat	Shetland West (stood down)	Shetland South
Last election	22 seats, 97.8%	Did not contest
Seats before	21	0
Seats won	19	1
Seat change	▼2	▲1
Popular vote	5,542	442
Percentage	88.2%	7.0%
Swing	▼9.6%	New
	Third party	Fourth party
Leader	Robbie McGregor	Tom Morton
Party	SNP	Labour
Leader's seat	Shetland South	Shetland North
Last election	1 seat, 0.0% (Note: The SNP named one candidate at the 2017 election in the Shetland South ward which was uncontested as the number of candidates was equal to the number of seats up for election.)	Did not contest
Seats before	1	0
Seats won	1	1
Seat change	Steady	▲1
Popular vote	276	0 (Note: Labour named one candidate at the 2022 election in the Shetland North ward which was uncontested as the number of candidates was equal to the number of seats up for election.)
Percentage	4.4%	0.0%
Swing	▲4.4%	New
Leader before election
Steven Coutts
Independent
Leader after election
Emma MacDonald
Independent

Elections to Shetland Islands Council took place on 5 May 2022 on the same day as the 31 other Scottish local government elections. As with other Scottish council elections, it was held using single transferable vote (STV) – a form of proportional representation – in which multiple candidates are elected in each ward and voters rank candidates in order of preference.

The elections were the first held since the passage of the Islands (Scotland) Act 2018 which allowed wards in Scottish councils containing islands to be reduced to single- and dual-member wards. As a result, the Shetland West ward was reduced from three members to two.

As with previous elections in the area, independent councillors retained a large majority of the seats on the council and retained control of the administration. For the first time, the Greens won a seat on the council and Labour won their first seat on the council since 1994.

== Background ==
=== Previous election ===
At the previous election in 2017, independent councillors retained control of the council after taking all but one seat. The Scottish National Party (SNP) took the other seat and, in the process, won their first-ever representation on the council.

2017 Shetland Islands Council election result
Party	Seats	Vote share
Independents	21	97.8%
SNP	1	0.0%

=== Electoral system ===
Local elections in Scotland use the single transferable vote (STV) electoral system – a form of proportional representation – in which voters rank candidates in order of preference. The 2022 election was the first to use the seven wards created under the Islands (Scotland) Act 2018, with 23 councillors being elected. Each ward elected either two, three or four members.

=== Composition ===
There were no changes to the political composition of the council following the election in 2017. Two by-elections were held and independents won both.

Party	2017 result	Dissolution
Independents	21	
SNP	1	

=== Retiring councillors ===
Party	Ward	Retiring councillor
Independent	North Isles	Alec Priest
Independent	Shetland North	Alastair Cooper
Independent	Shetland West	Steven Coutts
Independent	Shetland West	Theo Smith
Independent	Shetland South	George Smith
Independent	Lerwick North	Malcolm Bell
Independent	Lerwick South	Peter Campbell
Independent	Lerwick South	Stephen Flaws

=== Boundary changes ===
Following the implementation of the Islands (Scotland) Act 2018, a review of the boundaries was undertaken in North Ayrshire, Argyll and Bute, Highland, Orkney Islands, Shetland Islands and the Western Isles. The act allowed for single- or two-member wards to be created to allow for better representation of island communities. As a result, the seven existing wards were retained with realigned boundaries but the number of councillors was increased from 22 to 23. Lerwick North was renamed Lerwick North and Bressay but was otherwise unchanged, as were North Isles and Shetland North. The boundaries were adjusted in the remaining wards which resulted in Shetland Central and Shetland South being increased from three- to four-member wards and Shetland West being reduced to a dual-member ward.

Shetland MSP Beatrice Wishart opposed the proposals for the Shetland West ward over concerns that two councillors would not sufficiently represent their constituents on the council.

=== Candidates ===
The total number of candidates increased from 33 in 2017 to 36. The number of independent candidates (29) outstripped any individual party but fell by one from the previous election. The Greens contested an election in Shetland for the first time and named more candidates than any other party at three. The SNP stood two candidates – an increase of one from 2017 – while Labour named one candidate, contesting their first election in Shetland since 1994. Sovereignty also named one candidate for the election.

=== Uncontested Seats ===
After nominations closed on 30 March 2022, two wards – North Isles and Shetland North – did not receive enough candidates to trigger an election. Both are three-member wards and only five candidates stood in total. As a result, all five candidates were automatically elected without a poll being conducted and a by-election was scheduled to fill the vacant North Isles seat. The lack of interest in standing for election was called a "threat to local democracy" by the Greens. Across Scotland, 18 councillors were automatically elected because the number of candidates was not enough to trigger an election. During the 2017 local elections in Scotland, just three council wards were uncontested but votes were held in every ward in both 2007 and 2012 – the first elections to use multi-member wards and the single transferable vote. Public disinterest in standing for election to local councils has been linked to the "ridiculous" size of some local authorities and the low pay councillors receive for their work.

=== Campaign ===
During the election campaign, candidates gave particular focus to the cost of living, housing and the proposed construction of fixed-link tunnels. A survey conducted by The Shetland Times prior to the election found highest support for the issues of fuel poverty, fixed links and digital connectivity as priorities for the new council.

== Results ==
Shetland Islands Council election result 2022
Party	Seats	Gains	Losses	Net gain/loss	Seats %	Votes %	Votes	+/−
Independent	19	10	12	▼2	82.6	88.2	5,542	▼10.8
Green	1	1	0	▲1	4.3	7.0	442	New
SNP	1	0	0	Steady	4.3	4.4	276	▲4.4
Labour	1	1	0	▲1	4.3	0.0	0	New
Sovereignty	0	0	0	Steady	0.0	0.4	26	New
Vacant	1	1	0	▲1	4.3	N/A	N/A	N/A
Total	23						6,286	

Notes:

- Votes are the sum of first preference votes across all council wards. The net gain/loss and percentage changes relate to the result of the previous Scottish local elections on 4 May 2017. This is because STV has an element of proportionality which is not present unless multiple seats are being elected. This may differ from other published sources showing gain/loss relative to seats held at the dissolution of Scotland's councils.
- Following boundary changes, the total number of seats was increased from 22 to 23.

=== Ward summary ===
Results of the Shetland Islands Council election 2022 by ward
Ward	%	Cllrs	%	Cllrs	%	Cllrs	%	Cllrs	%	Cllrs	Total Cllrs
Ward	Independents		Green		SNP		Labour		Others		Total Cllrs
North Isles	—N/a	2									2
Shetland North	—N/a	2					—N/a	1			3
Shetland West	83.1	2	9.1	0	7.8	0					2
Shetland Central	91.2	4	7.0	0					1.8	0	4
Lerwick North and Bressay	100.0	3									3
Lerwick South	100.0	4									4
Shetland South	73.3	2	14.9	1	11.8	1					4
Total	88.2	19	7.0	1	4.4	1	0.0	1	0.4	0	22

Notes

1. A: Only two candidates stood for election in the three-member North Isles ward. A by-election was held on 4 August 2022 to elect a third member. Thus only 22 councillors were elected on 5 May 2022 instead of 23.

=== Seats changing hands ===
Below is a list of seats which elected a different party or parties from 2017 in order to highlight the change in political composition of the council from the previous election. The list does not include defeated incumbents who resigned or defected from their party and subsequently failed re-election while the party held the seat.

Seats changing hands
Seat	2017		2022	
Seat	Party	Member	Party	Member
Shetland North	Independent	Alastair Cooper	Labour	Tom Morton
Shetland South	Independent	Gregor Smith	Green	Alex Armitage

== Ward results ==
=== North Isles ===
Independent councillor Ryan Thomson retained the seat he had won at the previous election while independent candidate Duncan Anderson gained a seat. Incumbent councillors Alec Priest and Duncan Simpson did not stand for re-election and one seat was left vacant.

North Isles - 3 seats
Party	Candidate	Votes	%
Independent	Duncan Anderson	Unopposed	
Independent	Ryan Thomson	Unopposed	
Registered electors			

=== Shetland North ===
Independent councillors Emma MacDonald and Andrea Manson retained the seat he had won at the previous election while Labour gained a seat from former independent councillor Alastair Cooper who did not stand for re-election.

Shetland North - 3 seats
Party	Candidate	Votes	%
Independent	Emma MacDonald	Unopposed	
Independent	Andrea Manson	Unopposed	
Labour	Tom Morton	Unopposed	
Registered electors			

=== Shetland West ===
Following boundary changes, Shetland West was reduced from a three-member ward to a two-member ward. Independent candidates Liz Boxwell and John Leask gained seats from former independent councillors Steven Coutts and Theo Smith while incumbent independent councillor Catherine Hughson chose not to defend her seat but stood in Shetland Central instead.

Shetland West - 2 seats
Party	Candidate	FPv%	Count							
Party	Candidate	FPv%	1	2	3	4	5	6	7	8
Independent	Liz Boxwell	39.3	298							
Independent	John Leask	17.8	135	154	154	158	171	178	205	298
Independent	Mark Robinson	16.9	128	142	143	150	164	170	198	
Green	Debra Nicolson	9.1	69	70	71	71	81	118		
SNP	Zara Pennington	7.8	59	60	61	61	64			
Independent	Andrew Holt	5.7	43	46	47	50				
Independent	Ian Tinkler	2.8	21	21	21					
Independent	Peter Fraser	0.7	5	6						
Electorate: 1,364 Valid: 758 Spoilt: 13 Quota: 253 Turnout: 56.5%

=== Shetland Central ===
Following boundary changes, Shetland Central was increased from a three-member ward to a four-member ward. Independent candidates Davie Sandison and Ian Scott held the seats they had won at the previous election while independent candidates Moraig Lyall and Catherine Hughson gained a seat. Cllr Lyall was elected at a by-election in 2019 after former independent councillor Mark Burgess had stood down from his role. In 2017, Cllr Hughson was elected in Shetland West.

Shetland Central - 4 seats
Party	Candidate	FPv%	Count	
Party	Candidate	FPv%	1	2
Independent	Moraig Lyall (incumbent)	29.3	414	
Independent	Davie Sandison (incumbent)	22.8	322	
Independent	Catherine Hughson (Note: Sitting councillor for Shetland West.)	19.9	282	339
Independent	Ian Scott (incumbent)	19.2	271	308
Green	Martin Randall	7.0	99	116
Sovereignty	Brian Nugent	1.8	26	29
Electorate: 3,168 Valid: 1,414 Spoilt: 8 Quota: 283 Turnout: 44.9%

=== Lerwick North and Bressay ===
Independent councillor Stephen Leask retained the seat he won at the previous election while independent candidates Gary Robinson and Arwed Wenger gained seats from former independent councillors Malcolm Bell - who did not stand for re-election - and John Fraser - who chose not to defend his seat but stood in Lerwick South instead.

Lerwick North and Bressay - 3 seats
Party	Candidate	FPv%	Count				
Party	Candidate	FPv%	1	2	3	4	5
Independent	Stephen Leask (incumbent)	33.4	310				
Independent	Gary Robinson	32.4	301				
Independent	Arwed Wenger	14.7	136	164	189	220	312
Independent	Marie Williamson	12.4	115	133	146	173	
Independent	Stephen Ferguson	7.1	66	79	92		
Electorate: 2,410 Valid: 928 Spoilt: 13 Quota: 233 Turnout: 39.0%

=== Lerwick South ===
Independent councillor Cecil Smith retained the seat he won at the previous election while independent candidates Dennis Leask, John Fraser and Neil Pearson gained seats from former independent councillors Amanda Hawick, Beatrice Wishart - who stood down in 2019 after she was elected as MSP for Shetland - and Peter Campbell - who chose not to defend his seat but stood in Lerwick South instead. Former independent councillor Stephen Flaws, who was elected following a by-election in 2019, did not stand for re-election.

Lerwick South - 4 seats
Party	Candidate	FPv%	Count					
Party	Candidate	FPv%	1	2	3	4	5	6
Independent	Dennis Leask	22.5	302					
Independent	John Fraser (Note: Sitting councillor for Lerwick North.)	19.5	262	268	289			
Independent	Cecil Smith (incumbent)	18.4	251	257	275			
Independent	Neil Pearson	12.7	171	177	206	213	215	281
Independent	Amanda Hawick (incumbent)	11.4	153	156	168	173	176	208
Independent	Peter Coleman	7.8	106	109	120	123	125	
Independent	Shayne Mcleod	7.4	99	102				
Electorate: 3,036 Valid: 1,344 Spoilt: 17 Quota: 269 Turnout: 44.8%

=== Shetland South ===
Following boundary changes, Shetland South was increased from a three-member ward to a four-member ward. The SNP and independent councillor Allison Duncan retained the seats they had won at the previous election while the Greens and independent candidate Bryan Peterson gained seats. Former independent councillor George Smith did not stand for re-election.

Shetland South - 4 seats
Party	Candidate	FPv%	Count			
Party	Candidate	FPv%	1	2	3	4
Independent	Allison Duncan (incumbent)	42.7	805			
Independent	Bryan Peterson	27.1	500			
Green	Alex Armitage	14.8	274	325	360	405
SNP	Robbie McGregor (incumbent)	11.8	217	326	364	401
Independent	Stewart Douglas	2.5	46	169	197	
Electorate: 3,348 Valid: 1,842 Spoilt: 14 Quota: 369 Turnout: 55.4%

== Aftermath ==
Former council convener Malcolm Bell, who had held the role for the previous decade, had stood down prior to the election. Cllr Andrea Manson was elected to replace him by a single vote at the new council's first meeting on 23 May 2022. Former leader of the council Steven Coutts also stood down at the election and Cllr Emma MacDonald - who was previously depute leader of the council - was elected to replace him. Cllr Manson and Cllr MacDonald were the first women to hold the role of convener and leader respectively. Cllr MacDonald said she was "really excited" about taking on the role and added that being the council's first female leader "shows that this is a role that anybody can do, man or woman". Cllr Bryan Peterson was elected as depute convener and former council leader Gary Robinson was elected as depute leader.

=== North Isles by-election ===
A by-election was called shortly after the election in the North Isles ward due to the lack of nominations received at the full election of the council. The by-election was held on 4 August 2022. Two of the candidates, Stewart Douglas and Marie Williamson, had stood unsuccessfully in other wards (Shetland South and Lerwick North and Bressay respectively) during the full election. The by-election was won by independent candidate Robert Thomson.

North Isles by-election (4 August 2022) - 1 seat
Party	Candidate	FPv%	Count
Party	Candidate	FPv%	1
Independent	Robert Thomson	68.6	680
Independent	Sonia Robertson	10.7	106
Independent	Gary Cleaver	10.1	100
Independent	Marie Williamson	9.3	92
Independent	Stewart Douglas	1.3	13
Electorate: 2,156 Valid: 991 Spoilt: 6 Quota: 496 Turnout: 46.2%

=== Shetland West by-election ===
John Leask, councillor for Shetland West, stood down from the council in August 2022. A by-election, held on 17 November 2022, was won by independent candidate Mark Robinson.

Shetland West by-election (17 November 2022) - 1 seat
Party	Candidate	FPv%	Count
Party	Candidate	FPv%	1
Independent	Mark Robinson	76.4	375
Green	Debra Nicolson	13.6	67
SNP	Zara Pennington	10.0	49
Electorate: 1,350 Valid: 491 Spoilt: 2 Quota: 246 Turnout: 36.5%

=== Shetland North by-election ===
In October 2024, Shetland North councillor Tom Morton announced that he would stand down as a councillor as he was "unable to commit the necessary time and energy due to other professional and personal commitments". Cllr Morton remained a councillor until 31 October 2024 and a by-election was held on 23 January 2025, which was won by Andrew Hall.

Shetland North by-election (23 January 2025) - 1 seat
Party	Candidate	FPv%	Count
Party	Candidate	FPv%	1
Independent	Andrew Hall	90.4	887
Independent	Natasha Cornick	9.6	94
Electorate: 2,490 Turnout: 39.6%
