= North Isles (Shetland ward) =

Location of the ward

North Isles is one of the seven wards used to elect members of the Shetland Islands Council. It elects three Councillors.

== Councillors ==
Election	Councillors		
2007	Josie Simpson	Laura Baisley	Robert Henderson
2012	Steven Coutts	Gary Cleaver	Robert Henderson
2017	Duncan Simpson	Ryan Thomson	Alec Priest
2022	Duncan Anderson	Ryan Thomson	Robert Thomson

== Election results ==
=== 2022 by-election ===
North Isles by-election (4 August 2022) - 1 seat
Party	Candidate	FPv%	Count
Party	Candidate	FPv%	1
Independent	Robert Thomson	68.6	680
Independent	Sonia Robertson	10.7	106
Independent	Gary Cleaver	10.1	100
Independent	Marie Williamson	9.3	92
Independent	Stewart Douglas	1.3	13
Electorate: 2,156 Valid: 991 Spoilt: 6 Quota: 496 Turnout: 46.2%

=== 2022 election ===
North Isles - 3 seats
Party	Candidate	Votes	%
Independent	Duncan Anderson	Unopposed	
Independent	Ryan Thomson	Unopposed	
Registered electors			

=== 2017 election ===
2017 Shetland Islands Council election

North Isles - 3 seats
Party	Candidate	FPv%	Count	
Party	Candidate	FPv%	1	2
Independent	Duncan Simpson	31.2	453	
Independent	Ryan Thomson	26.3	372	
Independent	Alec Priest	23.1	327	375.08
Independent	Cecil Hughson	13.1	185	210.57
Independent	Lynsay Cunningham	5.4	76	81.68
Valid: 1413 Spoilt: 16 Quota: 354 Turnout: 63.7%

=== 2012 election ===
2012 Shetland Islands Council election

North Isles - 3 seats
Party	Candidate	FPv%	Count			
Party	Candidate	FPv%	1	2	3	4
Independent	Robert Henderson (incumbent)	30.85	430			
Independent	Steven Coutts	23.74	331	358.9		
Independent	Gary Cleaver	21.59	301	308.5	312.7	377.2
Independent	Jim Johnston	11.41	159	183.1	186.9	242.7
Independent	Alan Skinner	11.33	158	176.2	179.5	
Electorate: 2,278 Valid: 1,379 Spoilt: 15 Quota: 345 Turnout: 1,394 (61.19%)

=== 2007 election ===
2007 Shetland Islands Council election

Shetland Islands council election, 2007: North Isles
Party	Candidate	FPv%	%	Seat	Count
Independent	Josie Simpson	479	33.5	1	1
Independent	Laura Baisley	197	13.8	2	6
Independent	Robert Henderson	145	10.1	3	6
Independent	Brian Gregson	145	10.1		
Independent	Gordon Williamson	126	8.8		
Independent	Laurence Odie	117	8.2		
Independent	Laurence Robertson	113	7.9		
Independent	Robert Thomson	107	7.5		
