= 2003 Shetland Islands Council election =

2003 Scottish local government election

← 1999	1 May 2003	2007 →

All 22 seats to Shetland Islands Council 12 seats needed for a majority
	First party	Second party
Leader	Tom Stove	John Nicolson
Party	Independent	Liberal Democrats
Leader's seat	Cunningsburgh and Sandwick	Yell
Last election	12 seats, 64.1%	9 seats, 30.7%
Seats before	12	9
Seats won	17	5
Seat change	▲5	▼4
Popular vote	4,304	1,343
Percentage	76.2%	23.8%
Swing	▲12.1%	▼6.9%
Council Convener before election
Tom Stove
Independent
Council Convener after election
Sandy Cluness
Liberal Democrats

Results by ward.

Elections to the Shetland Islands Council were held on 1 May 2003 as part of Scottish local elections. The Liberal Democrats were reduced to 5 seats, with independent candidates making gains. Eight seats were uncontested.

== Election results ==
Shetland Islands Council election, 2003
Party	Seats	Gains	Losses	Net gain/loss	Seats %	Votes %	Votes	+/−
Independent	17	5	0	▲5	77.3	76.2	4,304	▲12.1
Liberal Democrats	5	0	4	▼4	22.7	23.8	1,343	▼6.9

== Ward results ==
Aithsting, Sandsting and Weisdale
Party	Candidate	Votes	%
Independent	Florence Grains (incumbent)	unopposed	unopposed
Majority		unopposed	unopposed
Independent hold			

Burra and Trondra
Party	Candidate	Votes	%
Independent	John Inkster	271	58.0%
Independent	Robert Hunter	196	42.0%
Majority		75	16.0%
Independent hold			

Cunningsburgh and Sandwick
Party	Candidate	Votes	%
Independent	Tom Stove (incumbent)	unopposed	unopposed
Majority		unopposed	unopposed
Independent hold			

Delting East and Lunnasting
Party	Candidate	Votes	%
Independent	Barbara Cheyne	234	57.4%
Independent	Joan Easten	90	22.1%
Independent	Thomas Anderson	84	20.6%
Majority		144	36.8%
Independent hold			

Delting West
Party	Candidate	Votes	%
Independent	Drew Ratter (incumbent)	260	67.4%
Independent	Andrea Manson-Clark	126	32.6%
Majority		64	34.8%
Independent hold			

Dunrossness
Party	Candidate	Votes	%
Liberal Democrats	Gordon Mitchell (incumbent)	unopposed	unopposed
Majority		unopposed	unopposed
Liberal Democrats hold			

Lerwick Breiwick
Party	Candidate	Votes	%
Independent	Cecil Eunson (incumbent)	360	77.4%
Liberal Democrats	Margaret Robertson	105	22.6%
Majority		255	54.8%
Independent hold			

Lerwick Clickimin
Party	Candidate	Votes	%
Independent	William Stove (incumbent)	175	62.7%
Independent	Michael Peterson	104	37.3%
Majority		71	25.4%
Independent hold			

Lerwick Harbour and Bressay
Party	Candidate	Votes	%
Independent	Edward Knight	282	67.8%
Liberal Democrats	Ronald Gair	134	32.2%
Majority		148	35.6%
Independent gain from Liberal Democrats			

Lerwick North
Party	Candidate	Votes	%
Independent	Leonard Groat	168	59.2%
Liberal Democrats	Robert Anderson (incumbent)	116	40.8%
Majority		52	18.4%
Independent gain from Liberal Democrats			

Lerwick North Central
Party	Candidate	Votes	%
Liberal Democrats	Sandy Cluness (incumbent)	unopposed	unopposed
Majority		unopposed	unopposed
Liberal Democrats hold			

Lerwick Sound
Party	Candidate	Votes	%
Independent	James Henry	147	52.7%
Liberal Democrats	Christine Begg (incumbent)	132	47.3%
Majority		15	5.6%
Independent gain from Liberal Democrats			

Lerwick South Central
Party	Candidate	Votes	%
Liberal Democrats	Gussie Angus (incumbent)	240	56.7%
Independent	Gary Robinson	183	43.3%
Majority		57	13.4%
Liberal Democrats hold			

Lerwick Upper Sound, Gulberwick and Quarff
Party	Candidate	Votes	%
Independent	Robert Feather	276	51.7%
Liberal Democrats	Peter Malcolmson (incumbent)	258	48.3%
Majority		18	3.4%
Independent gain from Liberal Democrats			

Nesting, Whiteness, Girlsta and Gott
Party	Candidate	Votes	%
Independent	James Irvine (incumbent)	unopposed	unopposed
Majority		unopposed	unopposed
Independent hold			

Northmavine, Muckle Roe and Busta
Party	Candidate	Votes	%
Independent	Bill Manson (incumbent)	270	60.0%
Liberal Democrats	Brenda Wilcock	180	40.0%
Majority		90	20.0%
Independent hold			

Sandwick, Levenwick and bigton
Party	Candidate	Votes	%
Independent	William Tait (incumbent)	279	63.8%
Liberal Democrats	Cecil Hughson	158	36.2%
Majority		121	27.6%
Independent gain from Liberal Democrats			

Scalloway
Party	Candidate	Votes	%
Independent	Iris Hawkins (incumbent)	303	66.4%
Independent	Ian Scott	153	33.6%
Majority		150	32.8%
Independent hold			

Unst & Fetlar
Party	Candidate	Votes	%
Independent	Brian Gregson	248	68.3%
Independent	Andrew Inkster	95	26.2%
Liberal Democrats	Sandra Gray	20	5.5%
Majority		153	42.1%
Independent gain from Liberal Democrats			

Walls, Sandness and Clousta
Party	Candidate	Votes	%
Liberal Democrats	Frank Robertson (incumbent)	unopposed	unopposed
Majority		unopposed	unopposed
Liberal Democrats hold			

Whalsay and Skerries
Party	Candidate	Votes	%
Independent	Josie Simpson (incumbent)	unopposed	unopposed
Majority		unopposed	unopposed
Independent hold			

Yell
Party	Candidate	Votes	%
Liberal Democrats	John Nicolson (incumbent)	unopposed	unopposed
Majority		unopposed	unopposed
Liberal Democrats hold			
