= North Isles (disambiguation) =

North Isles are the northern islands of the Shetland Islands, Scotland.

North Isles may also refer to:

- North Isles (Orkney ward), Scotland
- North Isles (Shetland ward), Scotland
