= Tom Morton =

Scottish writer

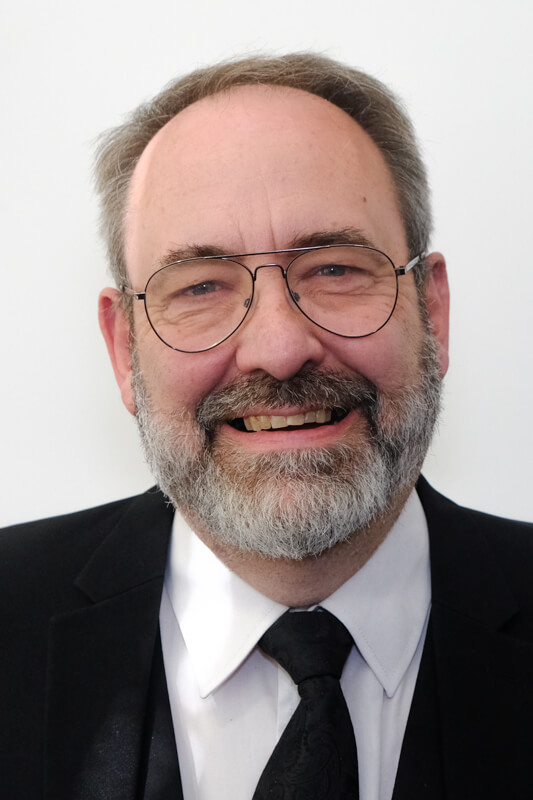
- Morton in 2022
- Born: Thomas Morton; 1955 (age 70–71); Carlisle, Cumberland, England
- Occupations: Journalist, author, broadcaster
- Spouse: Susan
- Children: Includes James Morton
- Website: Beatcroft.blogspot.co.uk

Thomas Morton (born 1955) is a Scottish broadcaster, journalist and author. He lives and works mainly in the Shetland Islands.

== Life ==
Morton was born in 1955, and moved to Shetland in 1987, three years after his wife, Susan, who was a General Practitioner (GP).

Until April 2015, Morton presented a BBC Radio Scotland show, broadcast Friday, Saturday and Sunday nights, from 10:00 pm to 1:00 am, a Scottish take on rock and pop, from obscure blues to mainstream pop and soul, to current independent releases.

From November 2011 until January 2015 he edited the magazine Shetland Life.

Morton was a co-author, with his son James, of their 2016 book Shetland : Cooking on the Edge of the World. James is known as a runner-up in series three of The Great British Bake Off in 2012.

Morton's book Holy Waters: Searching for the Sacred in a Glass, published in November 2022, was shortlisted for a Guild of Food Writers Award and won Drinks Book of the Year in the 2023 Fortnum & Mason Food and Drink writing awards.

In 2021, Morton was nominated as Scottish Labour's candidate in the local elections to Shetland Islands Council. He was one of three candidates nominated for three vacancies in the Shetland North Ward. As only three candidates stood, Morton became a councillor, unopposed. He stood down in October 2024.

== Works ==
Morton's works, which encompass both fiction and non fiction, include:

- Morton, Tom (2000). Internal combustion : a love story. ISBN 9781840183405. OCLC 48579310.
- Morton, Tom; McNaught, John (2007) [1992]. Spirit of adventure : a journey beyond the whisky trails. ISBN 9781427620149. OCLC 228073120.
- Morton, Tom; Allonson, Rob; Hamilton, Ken (2009). Journey's blend : five distilleries, three motorcycles, one whisky. ISBN 9780956308504. OCLC 751627780.
- Morton, James; Morton, Tom (2018). Shetland : cooking on the edge of the world. London: Quadrille. ISBN 9781787133068. OCLC 1051138004.
- Morton, Tom (2021). It Tolls for Thee — A Guide to Celebrating the End. ISBN 9781786784780. OCLC 1262792367.
- Morton, Tom (2022). Holy Waters: Searching for the Sacred in a Glass. Watkin's Books. ISBN 9781786786562
