= Lerwick Declaration =

2013 Scottish Government announcement

The Lerwick Declaration refers to an announcement made by First Minister Alex Salmond on behalf of the Scottish Government on 25 July 2013, which revealed that a ministerial working group would examine the prospect of decentralising power to Shetland, Orkney, and the Western Isles.

The declaration was made in response to the Our Islands - Our Future campaign launched in June 2013, in which the leaders of Scotland's island councils—Shetland Islands Council, Orkney Islands Council, and Comhairle nan Eilean Siar—called for greater autonomy for the islands. The campaign was designed to capitalise on discussions raised by the 2014 Scottish independence referendum, though the campaign itself is neutral on the topic of Scottish independence.

== See also ==
- Constitutional status of Orkney, Shetland and the Western Isles
