= 1999 Shetland Islands Council election =

1999 Scottish local government election

← 1994	6 May 1999	2003 →

All 22 seats to Shetland Islands Council 12 seats needed for a majority
	First party	Second party	Third party
Leader	Lewis Shand Smith	John Nicolson	Willie Tait
Party	Independent	Liberal Democrats	Independent Liberal
Leader's seat	Lerwick Breiwick (defeated)	Yell	Sandwick, Levenwick and Bigton
Last election	16 seats, 77.8%	2 seats, 6.7%	0 seats, 0.0%
Seats before	16	2	0
Seats won	12	9	1
Seat change	▼4	▲7	▲1
Popular vote	3,817	1,828	200
Percentage	64.1%	30.7%	3.4%
Swing	▼13.7%	▲24.0%	New
Council Convener before election
Lewis Shand Smith
Independent
Council Convener after election
Tom Stove
Independent

Results by ward.

Elections to the Shetland Islands Council were held on 6 May 1999 as part of Scottish local elections. The Liberal Democrats won 9 seats, the party's best result in a Shetland Islands Council election. Nine seats were uncontested.

== Aggregate results ==
Shetland Islands Council election, 1999
Party	Seats	Gains	Losses	Net gain/loss	Seats %	Votes %	Votes	+/−
Independent	12	0	4	▼4	54.55	64.1	3,817	▼13.7
Liberal Democrats	9	7	0	▲7	40.91	30.7	1,828	▲24.0
Independent Liberal	1	1	0	▲1	4.55	3.4	200	New
Independent Labour	0	0	0	0	0.00	1.9	112	▲1.9

== Ward results ==
Aithsting and Sandsting
Party	Candidate	Votes	%
Independent	Florence Grains (incumbent)	unopposed	unopposed
Majority		unopposed	unopposed
Independent hold			

Burra and Trondra
Party	Candidate	Votes	%
Independent	Alistair Goodlad	268	60.9%
Liberal Democrats	John Allen Halcrow	172	39.1%
Majority		96	21.8%
Independent hold			

Cunningsburgh and Sandwick
Party	Candidate	Votes	%
Independent	Thomas Stove	282	56.1%
Independent	Charles Simpson	141	28.0%
Independent	James Smith	80	15.9%
Majority		141	28.1%
Independent gain from Shetland Movement			

Delting East and Lunnasting
Party	Candidate	Votes	%
Independent	Mary Colligan (incumbent)	242	54.5%
Independent	Andrew Fraser	109	24.5%
Independent	Joan Easten	93	20.9%
Majority		133	30.0%
Independent hold			

Delting West
Party	Candidate	Votes	%
Independent	Drew Ratter (incumbent)	unopposed	unopposed
Majority		unopposed	unopposed
Independent hold			

Dunrossness
Party	Candidate	Votes	%
Independent	Gordon Mitchell	268	54.7%
Independent	Magnus Flaws (incumbent)	222	45.3%
Majority		46	9.4%
Independent hold			

Lerwick Breiwick
Party	Candidate	Votes	%
Independent	Cecil Eunson	231	51.8%
Independent	Lewis Shand Smith (incumbent)	215	48.2%
Majority		16	3.6%
Independent hold			

Lerwick Clickimin
Party	Candidate	Votes	%
Independent	William Stove (incumbent)	unopposed	unopposed
Majority		unopposed	unopposed
Independent hold			

Lerwick Harbour & Bressay
Party	Candidate	Votes	%
Liberal Democrats	Robert Black	224	45.3%
Liberal Democrats	Caroline Miller	187	37.9%
Liberal Democrats	Roy Whitehead	83	15.8%
Majority		37	7.4%
Liberal Democrats hold			

Lerwick North
Party	Candidate	Votes	%
Liberal Democrats	Robert Anderson	229	67.2%
Independent Labour	Leonard Groat (incumbent)	112	32.8%
Majority		117	34.4%
Liberal Democrats gain from Independent Labour			

Lerwick North Central
Party	Candidate	Votes	%
Liberal Democrats	Sandy Cluness	276	65.2%
Independent	Greta McElvogue (incumbent)	97	22.9%
Independent	J. Wiseman	50	11.8%
Majority		179	42.3%
Liberal Democrats gain from Independent			

Lerwick Sound
Party	Candidate	Votes	%
Liberal Democrats	Christine Begg	unopposed	unopposed
Majority		unopposed	unopposed
Liberal Democrats gain from Shetland Movement			

Lerwick South Central
Party	Candidate	Votes	%
Liberal Democrats	Leslie Angus	unopposed	unopposed
Majority		unopposed	unopposed
Liberal Democrats gain from Independent			

Lerwick Upper Sound, Gulberwick and Quarff
Party	Candidate	Votes	%
Liberal Democrats	Peter Malcolmson (incumbent)	unopposed	unopposed
Majority		unopposed	unopposed
Liberal Democrats hold			

Nesting, Whiteness, Girlsta and Gott
Party	Candidate	Votes	%
Independent	James Irvine	unopposed	unopposed
Majority		unopposed	unopposed
Independent hold			

Northmavine, Muckle Roe and Busta
Party	Candidate	Votes	%
Independent	Bill Manson (incumbent)	251	54.0%
Independent	Brenda Wilcox	214	46.0%
Majority		37	8.0%
Independent hold			

Sandwick, Levenwick and Bigton
Party	Candidate	Votes	%
Ind. Lib Dem	William Tait (incumbent)	200	37.3%
Liberal Democrats	Cecil Hughson	118	22.0%
Independent	Peter Watts	118	22.0%
Independent	Rosemary Inkster	100	18.7%
Majority		82	15.3%
Ind. Lib Dem gain from Independent			

Scalloway
Party	Candidate	Votes	%
Independent	Iris Hawkins (incumbent)	261	49.7%
Independent	John Burgess	170	32.4%
Independent	Ian Scott	94	17.9%
Majority		91	17.3%
Independent hold			

Unst and Fetlar
Party	Candidate	Votes	%
Liberal Democrats	Mark Ritch	254	57.3%
Independent	Brian Gregson	189	42.7%
Majority		65	14.6%
Liberal Democrats gain from Shetland Movement			

Walls, Sandness and Clousta
Party	Candidate	Votes	%
Liberal Democrats	Frank Robertson	285	70.0%
Independent	James Gear	122	30.0%
Majority		173	40.0%
Liberal Democrats gain from Independent			

Whalsay and Skerries
Party	Candidate	Votes	%
Independent	Loretta Hutchison (incumbent)	unopposed	unopposed
Majority		unopposed	unopposed
Independent hold			

Yell
Party	Candidate	Votes	%
Liberal Democrats	John Nicolson	unopposed	unopposed
Majority		unopposed	unopposed
Liberal Democrats gain from Independent			

== By-elections since 1999 ==
2002 Whalsay and Skerries by-election
Party	Candidate	Votes	%
Independent	Josie Simpson	292	58.9%
Independent	Kathleen Stewart	204	41.1%
Majority		88	17.8%
Independent hold			
