= Constitutional status of Orkney, Shetland and the Western Isles =

Status of the Scottish islands

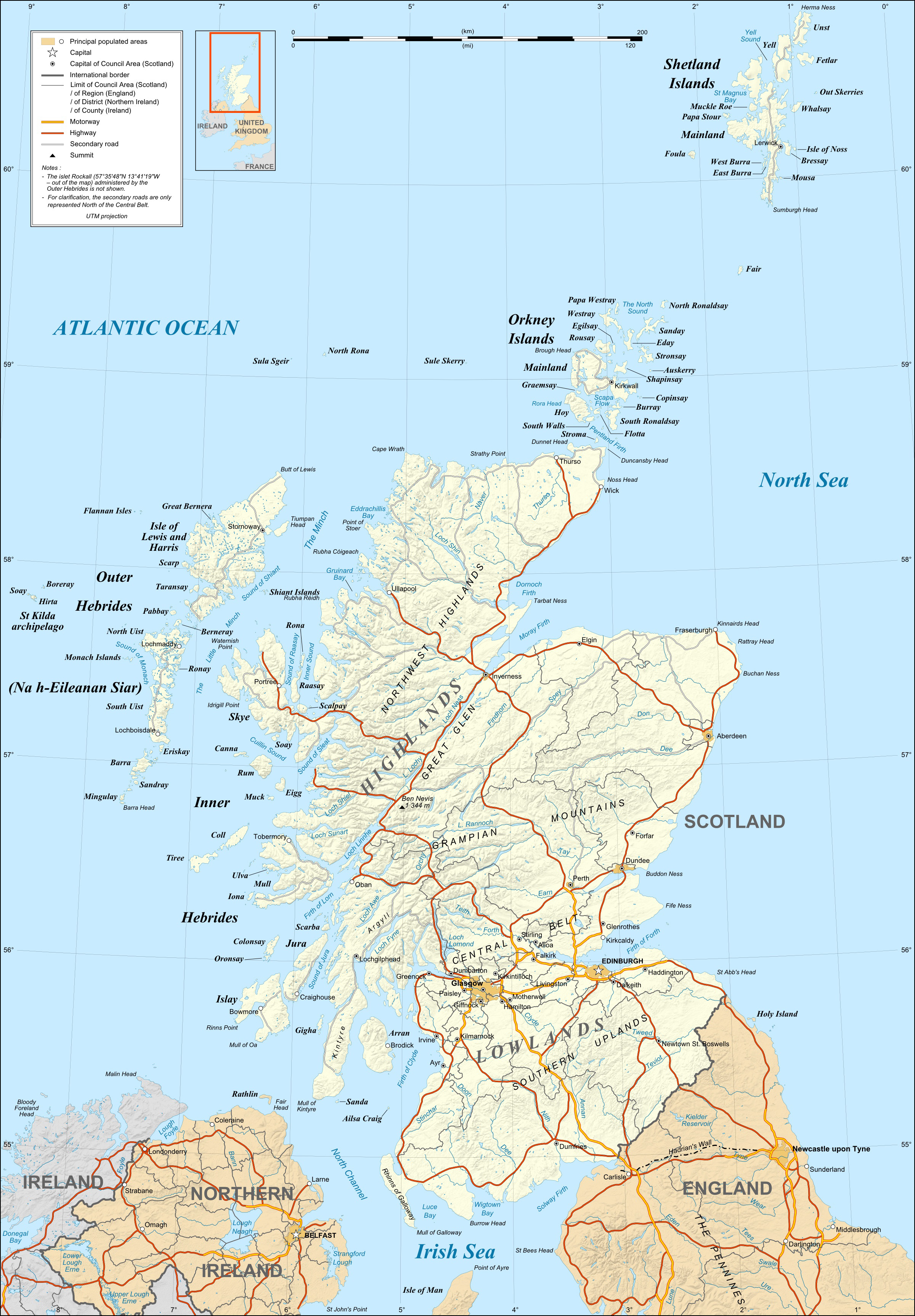
Map of Scotland showing Orkney and Shetland (north-east of the mainland) and the Western Isles or Outer Hebrides (north-west of the mainland)

The island groups of Orkney, Shetland and the Western Isles are all regions of Scotland. Their constitutional status has periodically been discussed, for example during the Scottish independence referendum campaign. Currently, they are council areas with the same constitutional status as the other 29 local government areas. The three island councils are the only local authorities among the 32 in the country where independent councillors form a majority.

In July 2013, the Scottish Government made the Lerwick Declaration, establishing a ministerial working group to examine decentralising powers to the three island council areas.

== History ==
Orkney and Shetland had from the 10th century been annexed by the Kingdom of Norway, but in 1468 and 1469 Orkney and Shetland were pledged as security against the payment of the dowry of his daughter Margaret, betrothed to James III of Scotland. After the Acts of Union of 1707 Orkney, Shetland and the Western Isles, along with the rest of Scotland, became part of the Kingdom of Great Britain.

=== Norwegian claim ===
Orkney and Shetland had from the 10th century been annexed by the Kingdom of Norway, who later entered a personal union with a common Danish monarch under the Kalmar Union. In 1468, Orkney was pledged by the Scandinavian king Christian I as security against the payment of the dowry of his daughter Margaret, betrothed to James III of Scotland. The following year he pawned Shetland to the Scottish Crown which has since refused to accept repayment and return it. (Note: Apparently without the knowledge of the Norwegian Riksrådet (Council of the Realm), Christian pawned Orkney for 50,000 Rhenish guilders. On 28 May the next year he also pawned Shetland for 8,000 Rhenish guilders. He secured a clause in the contract that gave future kings of Norway the right to redeem the islands for a fixed sum of about 210 kg of gold or 2,310 kg of silver. Several attempts were made during the 17th and 18th centuries to redeem the islands, without success.)

The King of Denmark often had to make a coronation oath to reclaim the islands, which was last made by Frederick III in 1648. The last serious attempt to reclaim the islands for Denmark-Norway was at the Treaty of Breda (1667).

=== Protected constituencies status ===
Under electoral law the Orkney and Shetland and Na h-Eileanan an Iar (The Western Isles) constituencies are "protected constituencies", which means that they have to be both unbroken and not sharing a constituency with any part of the mainland. This status is shared only with the Isle of Wight in England and Ynys Môn (Anglesey) in Wales. Before 2011 the Orkney and Shetland constituency had been unique in having its boundaries protected by legislation.

=== Island Council resolutions ===
In a meeting of the island councils in March 2013, leaders of the three local authorities discussed their future in the event of Scottish independence, including whether the islands could demand and achieve autonomous status within either Scotland or the rest of the UK. Among the scenarios proposed were achieving either Crown Dependency status or self-government modelled after the Faroe Islands, in association with either Scotland or the UK. Steven Heddle, Orkney's council leader, described pursuing Crown Dependency status as the least likely option, as it would threaten funding from the EU, which is essential for local farmers. Alasdair Allan, MSP for the Western Isles, said independence could have a positive impact on the isles, as "crofters and farmers could expect a substantial uplift in agricultural and rural development funding via the Common Agricultural Policy if Scotland were an independent member state of the EU".

=== Lerwick Declaration ===
In July 2013, the Scottish Government made the Lerwick Declaration, indicating an intention to decentralise power to the three island council areas. In November 2013, the government made a commitment to decentralise further powers to Orkney, Shetland and the Western Isles in the event of independence. Steven Heddle called for legislation to that effect to be introduced regardless of the referendum result.

In 2017 the Scottish Government introduced an Islands bill to make "island proofing" (including for uninhabited islands) a statutory requirement for public bodies. The Bill completed Stage 1 on 8 February 2018.

=== Orkney's Alternate Governance Resolution ===
In July 2023, James Stockan, the leader of the Orkney Islands Council said that the Orkney isles has been "failed dreadfully" by governments in Edinburgh and London, with funding less per capita than is received by Shetland and the Western Isles and that they were willing to explore its "Nordic connections", as well as looking at the governance structures of crown dependencies such as Guernsey, Jersey and the Isle of Man.

The council voted to explore alternative constitutional arrangements including becoming a Crown Dependency or rejoining Norway.

== Referendums ==
=== 1979 devolution referendum ===
In the 1979 Scottish devolution referendum, the Orkney and Shetland Islands council areas had the two highest proportions voting against devolution. The Western Isles voted in favour.

Council area	Yes vote	No vote	Yes %	No %
Orkney Islands	2,104	5,439	27.89	72.11
Shetland Islands	2,020	5,466	26.98	73.02
Western Isles	6,218	4,933	55.76	44.24
Whole of Scotland	1,230,937	1,153,500	51.62	48.38
Source: Glasgow Herald

=== 1997 devolution referendum ===
In the 1997 Scottish devolution referendum there were two questions, the first on whether there should be a Scottish Parliament, and the second whether the parliament should have tax raising powers.

On the first question, along with the rest of the country, the electorate in all three areas voted Yes. On the second question Orkney was one of only two areas in Scotland to vote No, Shetland narrowly voted in favour and the Western Isles voted more strongly in favour than the rest of Scotland.

Council area	Q1 Yes vote	Q1 No vote	Q1 Yes %	Q1 No %	Q2 Yes vote	Q2 No vote	Q2 Yes %	Q2 No %
Na h-Eileanan Siar (Western Isles)	9,977	2,589	79.4	20.6	8,557	3,947	68.4	31.6
Orkney	4,749	3,541	57.3	42.7	3,917	4,344	47.4	52.6
Shetland	5,430	3,275	62.4	37.6	4,478	4,198	51.6	48.4
Whole of Scotland	1,775,045	614,400	74.3	25.7	1,512,889	870,253	63.5	36.5

=== 2014 Scottish independence referendum ===
In the 2014 Scottish independence referendum, people voted on whether they wanted Scotland to become independent from the United Kingdom. Scotland as a whole voted 55.3% against independence. All three islands also voted against, with the Western Isles voting slightly less against independence, and Orkney and Shetland both voting significantly more against independence than the national average.

Area	Ballots for	Ballots against	For (%)	Against (%)	Majority	Valid ballots	Turnout (%)
Eilean Siar	9,195	10,544	46.6%	53.4%	6.8%	19,739	86.2%
Orkney Islands	4,883	10,004	32.8%	67.2%	34.4%	14,887	83.7%
Shetland Islands	5,669	9,951	36.3%	63.7%	27.4%	15,620	84.4%
Scotland (total)	1,617,989	2,001,926	44.6%	55.4%	10.6%	3,619,915	84.6%

==== Proposals for "counter-independence" referendum ====
Some islanders called for separate referendums to be held in the islands on 25 September 2014, one week after the Scottish referendum. In March 2014, the Scottish Parliament published the online petition it had received calling for such referendums, which was supported by Shetland MSP Tavish Scott. The referendums would ask islanders to choose from three options: that the island group should become an independent country; it should remain in Scotland; or (in the event of Scottish independence) it should remain in the UK.

The third option would implement the conditional promise made in 2012, when an SNP spokesperson said that, in the event of Scottish independence, Orkney and Shetland could remain in the United Kingdom if their "drive for self-determination" was strong enough. Politicians in the three island groups have referred to the Scottish referendum as the most important event in their political history "since the inception of the island councils in 1975." Angus Campbell, leader of the Western Isles Council, said that the ongoing constitutional debate "offers the opportunity for the three island councils to secure increased powers for our communities to take decisions which will benefit the economies and the lives of those who live in the islands".

A report by Tavish Scott and the Orkney MSP Liam McArthur, submitted in response to the UK government's consultation on the independence referendum put forward the idea that the Shetland and Orkney islands could remain a part of the United Kingdom in the event of Scottish independence or potentially pursue independence themselves.

Early in 2013, an opinion poll commissioned by the Press and Journal found only 8% of people in Shetland and Orkney supported the islands themselves becoming fully independent countries and completely separating from Scotland, with 82% against.

The day before the Scottish independence referendum in September 2014, Alistair Carmichael, the MP for Orkney and Shetland, suggested that if Shetland were to vote strongly against independence but the Scottish national vote was narrowly in favour, then a discussion would have to begin about Shetland becoming a self-governing Crown dependency outside of independent Scotland, similar to the Isle of Man. He stated that he did not want such circumstances to arise, "and the best way to avoid this was to vote no in the referendum."

== Movements for autonomy ==
The Orkney and Shetland Movement, a coalition of independence movements in Orkney and Shetland, contested the Orkney and Shetland constituency in the 1987 general election. It saw as its models the Isle of Man and the Faroe Islands, an autonomous dependency of Denmark. The Scottish National Party chose not to contest the seat to give the movement a "free run". Their candidate, John Goodlad, came 4th with 3,095 votes, 14.5% of those cast, and it did not stand in any subsequent election. The Movement took part in the 1989 Scottish Constitutional Convention.

A movement called Wir Shetland was launched in October 2015 to secede from the rest of Scotland in favour of becoming either a Crown Dependency or a British Overseas Territory, as a means of achieving greater autonomy for the Shetland Isles.

In September 2020 the Shetland Islands Council voted in favour of exploring options for "financial and political self-determination", stating that the islands' reliance on Scotland was "seriously threatening the prosperity, and even basic sustainability, of Shetland as a community."

== See also ==
- Constitutional status of Cornwall
- Devolution in the United Kingdom
