= 1994 Shetland Islands Council election =

1994 Scottish local government election

← 1990	8 May 1994	1999 →

All 26 seats to Shetland Islands Council 14 seats needed for a majority
	First party	Second party	Third party
Leader	Lewis Shand Smith		Tavish Scott
Party	Independent	Shetland Movement	Liberal Democrats
Leader's seat	Lerwick Twageos		Lerwick Harbour and Bressay
Last election	16 seats, 56.9%	7 seats, 31.4%	0 seats, 2.7%
Seats before	16	7	0
Seats won	16	6	2
Seat change	0	▼1	▲2
Popular vote	2,575	297	221
Percentage	77.8%	9.0%	6.7%
Swing	▲20.9%	▼22.4%	▲4.0%
	Fourth party	Fifth party
Leader	Bill Smith	Leonard Groat
Party	Labour	Independent Labour
Leader's seat	Lerwick Central	Lerwick North
Last election	1 seats, 7.1%	1 seat, 0.0%
Seats before	1	1
Seats won	1	1
Seat change	0	0
Popular vote	216	0
Percentage	6.5%	0.0%
Swing	▼0.6%	0.0%
Council Convener before election
Edward Thomason
Shetland Movement
Council Convener after election
Lewis Shand Smith
Independent

The result of the election

Elections to the Shetland Islands Council were held on 5 May 1994 as part of Scottish regional elections. The Shetland Movement lost one but maintained six seats, while the Liberal Democrats gained representation on the council for the first time. Only ten seats were contested.

== Aggregate results ==
Shetland Islands Council election, 1994
Party	Seats	Gains	Losses	Net gain/loss	Seats %	Votes %	Votes	+/−
Independent	16	0	0	0	54	77.9	2,575	▲20.9
Shetland Movement	6	0	1	▼1	24	8.1	297	▼22.4
Liberal Democrats	2	2	0	▲2	8	6.0	221	▲4.0
Labour	1	0	0	0	4	5.9	216	▼0.6
Independent Labour	1	0	0	0	4	0.0	0	0.0

== Ward results ==
Aithsting and Sandsting
Party	Candidate	Votes	%
Independent	Florence Grains (incumbent)	unopposed	unopposed
Majority		unopposed	unopposed
Independent hold			

Burra and Trondra
Party	Candidate	Votes	%
Independent	Charles Goodlad	unopposed	unopposed
Majority		unopposed	unopposed
Independent hold			

Delting East
Party	Candidate	Votes	%
Independent	Mary Colligan (incumbent)	unopposed	unopposed
Majority		unopposed	unopposed
Independent hold			

Delting West
Party	Candidate	Votes	%
Independent	Drew Ratter	220	59.5%
Independent	Andrea Manson (Incumbent)	150	40.5%
Majority		70	19.0%
Independent hold			

Dunrossness North
Party	Candidate	Votes	%
Independent	William Tait (Incumbent)	241	82.5%
Independent	Margaret Pickbourne	51	17.5%
Majority		190	65.0%
Independent hold			

Dunrossness South
Party	Candidate	Votes	%
Shetland Movement	Magnus Flaws (Incumbent)	258	82.4%
Independent	John Johnston	55	17.6%
Majority		203	64.8%
Shetland Movement hold			

Gulberwick, Quarff and Cunningsburgh
Party	Candidate	Votes	%
Independent	Robert Black	354	60.6%
Independent	Joan McLeod (Incumbent)	146	25.0%
Independent	Maurice Mullay	84	14.4%
Majority		208	35.6%
Independent hold			

Lerwick Breiwick
Party	Candidate	Votes	%
Independent	Cecil Eunson (incumbent)	unopposed	unopposed
Majority		unopposed	unopposed
Independent hold			

Lerwick Central
Party	Candidate	Votes	%
Labour	Bill Smith (Incumbent)	216	75.5%
Independent	Tommy Goudie	70	25.5%
Majority		146	50.0%
Labour hold			

Lerwick Clickimin
Party	Candidate	Votes	%
Shetland Movement	William Stove	unopposed	unopposed
Majority		unopposed	unopposed
Shetland Movement gain from Independent			

Lerwick Harbour and Bressay
Party	Candidate	Votes	%
Liberal Democrats	Tavish Scott	221	52.9%
Independent	James Irvine (Incumbent)	197	47.1%
Majority		24	5.8%
Liberal Democrats gain from Shetland Movement			

Lerwick North
Party	Candidate	Votes	%
Independent Labour	Leonard Groat (Incumbent)	unopposed	unopposed
Majority		unopposed	unopposed
Independent Labour hold			

Lerwick Lower Sound
Party	Candidate	Votes	%
Liberal Democrats	Peter Malcolmson	unopposed	unopposed
Majority		unopposed	unopposed
Liberal Democrats gain from Shetland Movement			

Lerwick Staney Hill
Party	Candidate	Votes	%
Independent	Lindsay Smith	unopposed	unopposed
Majority		unopposed	unopposed
Independent hold			

Lerwick Twageos
Party	Candidate	Votes	%
Independent	Lewis Shand Smith (Incumbent)	256	72.1%
Independent	Ian Selbie	99	27.9%
Majority		157	44.2%
Independent hold			

Lerwick Upper Sound
Party	Candidate	Votes	%
Shetland Movement	Robert Johnson	unopposed	unopposed
Majority		unopposed	unopposed
Shetland Movement hold			

Nesting and Lunnasting
Party	Candidate	Votes	%
Independent	Greta McElvogue (incumbent)	unopposed	unopposed
Majority		unopposed	unopposed
Independent hold			

Northmavine
Party	Candidate	Votes	%
Independent	Bill Manson (incumbent)	unopposed	unopposed
Majority		unopposed	unopposed
Independent hold			

Sandness and Walls
Party	Candidate	Votes	%
Independent	James Gear (Incumbent)	189	59.4%
Independent	Olive Watson	129	40.6%
Majority		60	18.8%
Independent hold			

Sandwick
Party	Candidate	Votes	%
Shetland Movement	James Smith	unopposed	unopposed
Majority		unopposed	unopposed
Shetland Movement hold			

Scalloway
Party	Candidate	Votes	%
Independent	Iris Hawkins	241	50.4%
Independent	David Nicolson	119	24.9%
Independent	Ian Scott	79	16.5%
Shetland Movement	William Anderson (Incumbent)	39	8.2%
Majority		122	25.5%
Independent gain from Shetland Movement			

Unst
Party	Candidate	Votes	%
Shetland Movement	Joan Easten (Incumbent)	unopposed	unopposed
Majority		unopposed	unopposed
Shetland Movement gain from Independent			

Whalsay and Skerries
Party	Candidate	Votes	%
Independent	Loretta Hutchison	unopposed	unopposed
Majority		unopposed	unopposed
Independent hold			

Whiteness, Weisdale and Tingwall
Party	Candidate	Votes	%
Independent	Jonathan Wills (Incumbent)	unopposed	unopposed
Majority		unopposed	unopposed
Independent hold			

Yell North and Fetlar
Party	Candidate	Votes	%
Independent	Brian Gregson	165	62.2%
Independent	Leslie Angus	75	28.3%
Independent	Alan Ogden	25	9.4%
Majority		140	33.9%
Independent gain from Shetland Movement			

Unst
Party	Candidate	Votes	%
Shetland Movement	Peter Guy (Incumbent)	unopposed	unopposed
Majority		unopposed	unopposed
Shetland Movement gain from Independent			

== By-elections since 1994 ==
1996 Yell South by-election
Party	Candidate	Votes	%
Independent	John Nicolson	217	63.8%
Independent	Sandy Cluness	94	27.6%
Independent	Alan Ogden	29	8.5%
Majority		123	36.2%
Independent gain from Shetland Movement			
