= Sovereignty (Scotland) =

- Leader: Brian Nugent
- Founded: 14 August 2020
- Registered: PP12666
- Headquarters: Schoolhouse; Hamnavoe; Burra; ZE2 9LA
- Ideology: Scottish independence Hard Euroscepticism
- National affiliation: Alliance to Liberate Scotland (since 2025)
- Colours: Saltire blue

Website
- sovereignty.scot

Sovereignty, previously known as Restore Scotland, is a political party in Scotland, founded on 14 August 2020. The party stands for full independence for Scotland from both the United Kingdom and the European Union.

== History ==
The party was launched fifty days before the 2021 Scottish Parliament election, when it announced its plans to contest both constituency and regional seats. According to The National, interim Party Leader David McHutchon had been critical of the "Scottish National Party's pro-Brussels stance and the Scottish Government’s new hate crime legislation", while Deputy Leader Don Morrison had been a member of the SNP for 54 years, but said that he had become "increasingly exasperated by the party’s insistence on re-joining the European Union", according to The Scotsman. Kevin McKenna highlighted the benefits for the Yes Movement of the party's formation.

In the 2021 elections, Restore Scotland contested four constituency seats—Banffshire and Buchan Coast, Dundee City West, Inverness and Nairn, and Shetland—and two regions, North East Scotland and Highlands and Islands.

On 3 August 2021, The Herald announced that Jim Fairlie, former Depute Leader of the SNP had joined the party. Sovereignty joined the Liberate Scotland group for the 2026 Scottish Parliament election. Brian Nugent, the former chair of Yes Shetland, became the new leader. Nugent stood in Shetland. He previously stood for the party in the 2022 Shetland Islands Council election. Laurie Moffat, a former rugby captain stood for the constituency of Cowdenbeath.

In the 2026 Scottish Parliament election Sovereignty won no seats but came in 7th place.

== Leaders ==
- David McHutchon (2020–2025)
- Brian Nugent (2025–present)

== Electoral performance ==
=== Scottish Parliament ===
Election	Political party	Constituency			Regional			Total seats	+/–	Government
Election	Political party	Vote	%	Seats	Vote	%	Seats	Total seats	+/–	Government
2021	Restore Scotland	1,192	0.04%	0 / 73	1149	0.04%	0 / 56	0 / 129	New	—N/a
2026	Sovereignty	4,768	0.21	0 / 73	19,318	0.85%	0 / 56	0 / 129	7th	—N/a

=== Local government ===
Election	Political party	Constituency		
Election	Political party	Vote	%	Seats
2022	Restore Scotland	26	0.4	0 / 23
