= Danus Skene =

Scottish politician (1944–2016)

Danus George Moncrieff Skene (2 April 1944 – 19 August 2016) Chief of the Name and Arms of Skene, also 10th of Piltout and 15th of Hallyards, was a Scottish nobleman, teacher, educationalist and politician.

== Early life ==
Skene was born in Dundee, and brought up in Fife. He was educated at Eton College, then read African Studies at the University of Sussex, Public Administration at the University of Chicago and Education at the University of Aberdeen before becoming a schoolteacher in Elgin. Skene's teaching career later included stints in Israel and Kenya, work in the education department of Tayside Regional Council, and also service on the board of the Scottish Qualification Authority.

== Political activity from the 1970s to the 2000s ==
Skene joined the Labour Party and stood unsuccessfully in Kinross and West Perthshire in both February and October 1974 general elections, and served on the party's Scottish Executive. In 1976, he was a founder of the Scottish Labour Party (SLP), a split from the Labour Party. He wrote a paper on rural land policy for the party, and was the secretary of the northern "Yes for Scotland" campaign during the 1979 Scottish devolution referendum. However, shortly before the referendum, he joined the Liberal Party. He was elected to Perth and Kinross District Council as the Independent councillor for Blair Atholl and Kinloch Rannoch in 1980.

Skene stood for the Liberals unsuccessfully in Tayside North at the 1983 general election, and lost his council seat the same year. In 1987, he stood in Moray, taking fourth place with just over 10% of the vote. He remained active when the party became part of the Liberal Democrats, being on the party list for Scotland at the European Parliament election, 1999. However, by 2007, he was concerned that the party now regarded itself as British unionist, when he was a Scottish nationalist.

== Chief of Clan Skene ==
Early in the 1990s, Skene was approached by American-based members of Clan Skene who believed that he might be head of the clan. This was confirmed by the Lord Lyon, and in 1994, Skene was confirmed as Chief of the Name and Arms of Skene.

== SNP politician ==
By the 2010s, Skene was living in Lerwick, where he was chair of Shetland Arts. He stood down from this post to contest Orkney and Shetland for the Scottish National Party at the 2015 general election, in which he took a close second place, with 37.8% of the vote. He was also selected as the party's candidate for Shetland at the 2016 Scottish Parliament election, coming second to the sitting Liberal Democrat MSP, Tavish Scott, with a share of 23.1% of the vote.

== Death ==
Danus Skene died in the early hours of the morning in London on 19 August 2016 following surgery.

Baronage of Scotland
| Preceded by Robert Skene | Baron of Skene; 1992-2016 | Succeeded by Dugald Skene |
