= Beatrice Wishart =

Scottish Liberal Democrat politician (born 1956)

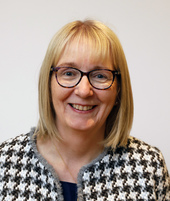

Member of the Scottish Parliament for Shetland
- In office 30 August 2019 – 9 April 2026
- Preceded by: Tavish Scott
- Succeeded by: Hannah Mary Goodlad

Personal details
- Born: 1956 (age 69–70) Lerwick, Shetland Islands, Scotland
- Party: Scottish Liberal Democrats (2019–present)
- Other party: Independent (2017–2019)
- Education: Anderson High School, Lerwick
- Website: Official Website

Beatrice Wishart (born 1956) is a Scottish Liberal Democrats politician who served as the Member of the Scottish Parliament (MSP) for Shetland from 2019 to 2026. Wishart served as spokesperson for both Connectivity and Rural Affairs for her party, and is Deputy Convener for the Rural Affairs and Islands Committee. She was elected at the 2019 Shetland by-election, after the sitting Liberal Democrat MSP Tavish Scott stepped down.

== Political career ==
Wishart stood in the 2017 Scottish local elections as an independent candidate for Shetland Islands Council, being elected as one of four members for the Lerwick South ward. After the election she was appointed depute convenor of the council.

In July 2019 she was selected as a candidate for the Scottish Liberal Democrats for the 2019 Shetland by-election scheduled for 29 August, having been associated with the party for the previous decade – running the offices of Alistair Carmichael, MP for Orkney and Shetland, and the outgoing MSP for Shetland, Tavish Scott. The campaign was hard-fought; the SNP spent £100,000 on the by-election – more money than the party spent during the entire EU referendum – and there was a swing of over 14% to their candidate. Wishart held the seat for the Scottish Liberal Democrats with a majority of 1,837 votes or 15.5%. She made her maiden speech in the Scottish Parliament on 10 September 2019, which concerned immigration into Scotland after Brexit.

Shortly after being elected, Wishart was appointed as education spokesperson for the Scottish Liberal Democrats, and was made a member of the Scottish Parliament's Education and Skills Committee. Wishart, who had previously worked on the Shetland Islands Council's Education and Families Committee, stressed her belief that "getting a high quality education helps people meet their full potential in life". From February 2020, Wishart also sat on the Scottish Parliament's Culture, Tourism, Europe and External Affairs Committee, taking over from Mike Rumbles.

In a letter to Nicola Sturgeon in April 2020, Wishart suggested that the Shetland Islands could be "the ideal place to pilot an exit strategy from lockdown", which had been put in place in response to the COVID-19 pandemic. Wishart cited as "encouraging" statements made by Hugh Pennington, emeritus professor at the University of Aberdeen, who had noted that "there could soon be a case for a geographical lifting of restrictions – such as in some of the Scottish islands and the Highlands and Grampian". Later that month, Wishart was appointed as a member of the Scottish Parliament's COVID-19 Committee.

At the 2021 Scottish Parliament election, Wishart was re-elected with a majority of 806 votes, the third smallest majority of that election.

In May 2021, following the Scottish Parliament election, Wishart left the Education and Skills Committee, the Culture, Tourism, Europe and External Affairs committee, and the COVID-19 Committee, and was appointed Deputy Convener of the Rural Affairs, Islands and Natural Environment Committee, which was renamed the Rural Affairs and Islands Committee in February 2023.

Wishart is a member of several Cross-Party Groups (CPGs) in the Scottish Parliament. Notably, she is Convener for the CPG on Brain Tumours and the CPG on Nordic Countries. Other CPGs on which she is either Deputy or Co-Convener are Crofting, Fisheries and Coastal Communities, Islands, Men's Violence Against Women and Children, Oil and Gas, Poverty, Space, and Women Against State Pension Inequality (WASPI).

On 17 March 2026, Beatrice Wishart was the only Scottish Liberal Democrat to vote against the introduction of assisted dying in Scotland, voting against the Assisted Dying Bill (Scotland) in a free vote.

Wishart stood down at the 2026 Scottish Parliament election, having announced her intention to do so on 20 February 2025.

Scottish Parliament
Preceded by Tavish Scott	Member of the Scottish Parliament for Shetland; 2019–2026	Succeeded by Hannah Mary Goodlad
