= 2017 Shetland Islands Council election =

2017 Scottish local government election

← 2012	4 May 2017	2022 →

All 22 seats to Shetland Islands Council 12 seats needed for a majority
- Registered: 15,025
- Turnout: 49.1% (▼5.6)
	First party	Second party
Leader	Gary Robinson	Robbie McGregor
Party	Independent	SNP
Leader's seat	Shetland West (defeated)	Shetland South
Last election	22 seats, 96.9%	0 seats, 1.9%
Seats before	22	0
Seats after	21	1
Seat change	▼1	▲1
Popular vote	7,132	0
Percentage	97.8%	0.0%
Swing	▲0.9%	▼1.9%
Council Leader before election
Gary Robinson
Independent
Council Leader after election
Cecil Smith
Independent

Elections to Shetland Islands Council were held on 4 May 2017 on the same day as the other Scottish local government elections. The election was the third using seven wards created as a result of the Local Governance (Scotland) Act 2004, each ward electing three or four Councillors using the single transferable vote system form of proportional representation, with 22 Councillors elected.

With the Shetland South ward going uncontested, the SNP elected its first councillor in Shetland.

Several members of the pro-Shetland Autonomy Wir Shetland group stood in the election; Ian Tinkler in Shetland West, and Alec Priest and Duncan Simpson in North Isles. Former Wir Shetland member Ryan Thomson also stood in North Isles. Whilst having left the group, it was claimed by the Wir Shetland Chairman that Thomson still supported the group's core aims. Other candidates with political positions of note included socialist Ian Scott and former Yes Scotland and Scottish Leave Left campaigner Brian Nugent in central ward. Nugent is an SNP member and claimed to be standing as an independent solely due to having applied too late to use the SNP party name in the election. Two paper candidates for the Conservatives also stood.

== Election results ==
Shetland Islands local election result 2017
Party	Seats	Gains	Losses	Net gain/loss	Seats %	Votes %	Votes	+/−
Independent	21	0	1	▼1	95.5	97.8	7,132	▲0.9
SNP	1	1	0	▲1	4.5	0.0	0	▼1.9
Independent Nationalist	0	0	0	0	0.0	1.2	84	New
Conservative	0	0	0	0	0.0	1.0	74	New

Note: "Votes" are the first preference votes. The net gain/loss and percentage changes relate to the result of the previous Scottish local elections on 3 May 2012. This may differ from other published sources showing gain/loss relative to seats held at dissolution of Scotland's councils.

== Ward results ==
=== North Isles ===
- 2012: 3xIndependent
- 2017: 3xIndependent
- 2012-2017 Change: no change

North Isles - 3 seats
Party	Candidate	FPv%	Count	
Party	Candidate	FPv%	1	2
Independent	Duncan Simpson	31.2	453	
Independent	Ryan Thomson	26.3	372	
Independent	Alec Priest	23.1	327	375.08
Independent	Cecil Hughson	13.1	185	210.57
Independent	Lynsay Cunningham	5.4	76	81.68
Valid: 1413 Spoilt: 16 Quota: 354 Turnout: 63.7%

=== Shetland North ===
- 2012: 3xIndependent
- 2017: 3xIndependent
- 2012-2017 Change: no change

Shetland North - 3 seats
Party	Candidate	FPv%	Count	
Party	Candidate	FPv%	1	2
Independent	Andrea Manson (incumbent)	42.7	509	
Independent	Alastair Cooper (incumbent)	33.1	395	
Independent	Emma Macdonald	20.1	240	379.04
Conservative	Isobel Johnson	4.0	48	70.28

=== Shetland West ===
- 2012: 3xIndependent
- 2017: 3xIndependent
- 2012-2017 Change: no change

Shetland West - 3 seats
Party	Candidate	FPv%	Count			
Party	Candidate	FPv%	1	2	3	4
Independent	Theo Smith (incumbent)	42.5	521			
Independent	Catherine Hughson	15.8	194	255.61	274.72	320.47
Independent	Gary Robinson (incumbent)	14.6	179	204.47	209.29	217.57
Independent	Steven Coutts (incumbent)	14.3	175	251.40	275.92	325.47
Independent	Debra Nicolson	6.6	81	107.29	132.81	
Independent	Ian Tinkler	6.1	75	90.61		

=== Shetland Central ===
- 2012: 3xIndependent
- 2017: 3xIndependent
- 2012-2017 Change: no change

Shetland Central - 3 seats
Party	Candidate	FPv%	Count			
Party	Candidate	FPv%	1	2	3	4
Independent	Davie Sandison (incumbent)	32.9	320			
Independent	Mark Burgess (incumbent)	26.7	260			
Independent	Ian Scott	19.6	191	214.04	217.18	263.52
Independent	Julie Buchan	12.1	118	139.61	146.87	169.40
Independent Nationalist	Brian Nugent	8.6	84	93.26	95.79	

=== Shetland South ===
- 2012: 3xIndependent
- 2017: 2xIndependent, 1xScottish National Party
- 2012-2017 Change: SNP gain one seat from Independent

Shetland South - 3 seats
Party	Candidate	FPv%	Count
Party	Candidate	FPv%	1
Independent	Allison Duncan (incumbent)	uncontested	uncontested
SNP	Robbie McGregor	uncontested	uncontested
Independent	George Smith (incumbent)	uncontested	uncontested

=== Lerwick North ===
- 2012: 3xIndependent
- 2017: 3xIndependent
- 2012-2017 Change: 3xIndependent

Lerwick North - 3 seats
Party	Candidate	FPv%	Count		
Party	Candidate	FPv%	1	2	3
Independent	Malcolm Bell (incumbent)	71.9	715		
Independent	Stephen Leask	13.2	130	337.25	
Independent	John Fraser	12.4	124	243.92	287.73
Conservative	Thomas Williamson	2.6	26	54.68	68.93

=== Lerwick South ===
- 2012: 4xIndependent
- 2017: 4xIndependent
- 2012-2017: no change

Lerwick South - 4 seats
Party	Candidate	FPv%	Count			
Party	Candidate	FPv%	1	2	3	4
Independent	Cecil Smith (incumbent)	28.8	429			
Independent	Beatrice Wishart†	26.4	394			
Independent	Peter Campbell (incumbent)	20.0	299			
Independent	Amanda Westlake (incumbent)	12.7	190	242.42	271.12	408.83
Independent	Frances Valente	12.1	180	220.61	268.35	

== Retiring Councillors ==
Council Ward	Departing Councillor	Party
Shetland North	Gary Cleaver	Independent
Shetland South	Billy Fox	Independent
North Isles	Robert Henderson	Independent
Shetland North	Drew Ratter	Independent
Shetland West	Frank Robertson	Independent
Lerwick North	Michael Stout	Independent
Shetland Central	Vaila Wishart	Independent
Lerwick North	Allan Wishart	Independent
Lerwick South	Jonathan Wills	Independent

== Changes Since 2017 ==
- † Lerwick South Independent Beatrice Wishart was subsequently elected as Member of the Scottish Parliament for Shetland at the 2019 Shetland by-election as a Liberal Democrat. A by-election was held on 7 November 2019. It was held by Independent Stephen Flaws.
- †† Shetland Central Independent Mark Burgess resigned his seat on 20 September 2019 for personal reasons. A by-election was held on 7 November 2019. The seat was retained by another Independent Moraig Lyall.

=== By-elections since 2017 ===
Shetland Central By-election (7 November 2019)
Party	Candidate	FPv%	Count		
Party	Candidate	FPv%	1	2	3
Independent	Moraig Lyall	47.0	344	366	379
Independent	Julie Buchan	15.8	116	131	170
SNP	Stewart Douglas	15.2	111	119	125
Independent	Gordon Laverie	11.5	84	93	
Independent	Johan Adamson	10.5	77		
Turnout: 732 (31.0%)

Lerwick South By-election (7 November 2019)
Party	Candidate	FPv%	Count			
Party	Candidate	FPv%	1	2	3	4
Independent	Gary Robinson	35.1	374	385	407	451
Independent	Stephen Flaws	32.8	350	368	403	498
Independent	Frances Valente	14.4	154	172	204	
Independent	Arwed Wenger	10.9	116	126		
Independent	Caroline Henderson	6.8	73			
Turnout: 732 (31.2%)
