= 2012 Shetland Islands Council election =

2012 Scottish local government election

← 2007	3 May 2012	2017 →

All 22 seats to Shetland Islands Council 12 seats needed for a majority
- Turnout: 54.7% (▼4.3)
	First party
Leader	Josie Simpson
Party	Independent
Leader's seat	North Isles
Last election	22 seats, 100%
Seats before	22
Seats won	22
Seat change	0
Popular vote	9,326
Percentage	96.9%
Swing	▲4.1%
- Map of council wards
Council Leader before election
Josie Simpson Retired
Independent
Council Leader after election
Gary Robinson
Independent

Elections to Shetland Islands Council were held on 3 May 2012, the same day as the other Scottish local government elections. The election was the second using the seven new wards created as a result of the Local Governance (Scotland) Act 2004, each ward elected three or four Councillors using the single transferable vote system form of proportional representation, with 22 Councillors elected.

As in 2007 Independents took all of the 22 seats on the council. The Scottish National Party contested both Lerwick Wards for the first time in 2012 but only secured 1.9% of the vote. The council was again administered solely by Independents.

== Election results ==
Shetland Islands local election result 2012
Party	Seats	Gains	Losses	Net gain/loss	Seats %	Votes %	Votes	+/−
Independent	22	0	0	0	100.0	96.9	9,326	▲4.1
SNP	0	0	0	0	0.0	1.9	184	New
Scottish Christian	0	0	0	0	0.0	1.2	116	New

Note: "Votes" are the first preference votes. The net gain/loss and percentage changes relate to the result of the previous Scottish local elections on 3 May 2007. This may differ from other published sources showing gain/loss relative to seats held at dissolution of Scotland's councils.

== Ward results ==
=== North Isles ===
- 2007: 3xIndependent
- 2012: 3xIndependent
- 2007-2012 Change: No change

North Isles - 3 seats
Party	Candidate	FPv%	Count			
Party	Candidate	FPv%	1	2	3	4
Independent	Robert Henderson (incumbent)	30.85	430			
Independent	Steven Coutts	23.74	331	358.9		
Independent	Gary Cleaver	21.59	301	308.5	312.7	377.2
Independent	Jim Johnston	11.41	159	183.1	186.9	242.7
Independent	Alan Skinner	11.33	158	176.2	179.5	
Electorate: 2,278 Valid: 1,379 Spoilt: 15 Quota: 345 Turnout: 1,394 (61.19%)

=== Shetland North ===
- 2007: 3xIndependent
- 2012: 3xIndependent
- 2007-2012 Change: No change

Shetland North - 3 seats
Party	Candidate	FPv%	Count						
Party	Candidate	FPv%	1	2	3	4	5	6	7
Independent	Andrea Manson	30.79	444						
Independent	Alastair Cooper (incumbent)	23.99	346	369.9					
Independent	Drew Ratter	17.82	257	274	279.4	283.5	299.5	345.4	421.3
Independent	Davy Cooper	11.93	172	182.3	184.3	191.2	209.9	257.9	
Independent	Jim Reyner	8.25	119	129.9	130.8	141.4	153.9		
Independent	Alan MacDonald	4.09	59	65.7	66.7	72.7			
Independent	Colin Arnot	2.50	36	40.4	40.8				
Electorate: 2,488 Valid: 1,433 Spoilt: 9 Quota: 359 Turnout: 1,442 (57.96%)

=== Shetland West ===
- 2007: 3xIndependent
- 2012: 3xIndependent
- 2007-2012 Change: No change

Shetland West - 3 seats
Party	Candidate	FPv%	Count						
Party	Candidate	FPv%	1	2	3	4	5	6	7
Independent	Theo Smith	36.97	481						
Independent	Gary Robinson (incumbent)	27.59	359						
Independent	Tom MacIntyre	8.99	117	142.1	148.1	166.6	183.3	206.9	
Independent	Frank Robertson (incumbent)	8.61	112	160.3	163.6	187.4	216.3	269.9	381.3
Independent	Ian Tinkler	5.99	78	107	112.9	127.9	167.8		
Independent	Andy Holt	5.92	77	103.8	109.6	126.8			
Independent	Marion Hughson	5.23	68	85.6	91.3				
Electorate: 2,033 Valid: 1,292 Spoilt: 9 Quota: 324 Turnout: 1,301 (63.99%)

=== Shetland Central ===
- 2007: 3xIndependent
- 2012: 3xIndependent
- 2007-2012 Change: No change

Shetland Central - 3 seats
Party	Candidate	FPv%	Count				
Party	Candidate	FPv%	1	2	3	4	5
Independent	Davie Sandison (incumbent)	35.92	375				
Independent	Vaila Wishart	25.57	267				
Independent	Ian Scott	13.89	145	162.2	163.7	171.8	190.2
Independent	Mark Burgess	13.70	143	193.9	196.8	221.1	259
Independent	John Hunter	4.79	50	74.3	76.8	81.5	
Scottish Christian	Peter Jamieson	4.60	48	52.7	53.1		
Electorate: 2,284 Valid: 1,028 Spoilt: 16 Quota: 258 Turnout: 1,044 (45.71%)

=== Shetland South ===
- 2007: 3xIndependent
- 2012: 3xIndependent
- 2007-2012 Change: No change

Shetland South - 3 seats
Party	Candidate	FPv%	Count	
Party	Candidate	FPv%	1	2
Independent	Alison Duncan (incumbent)	45.15	685	
Independent	George Smith	27.55	418	
Independent	Billy Fox	22.21	337	498.8
Scottish Christian	Andrew Shearer	4.48	68	110.6
Electorate: 2,679 Valid: 1,508 Spoilt: 9 Quota: 378 Turnout: 1,517 (56.63%)

=== Lerwick North ===
- 2007: 3xIndependent
- 2012: 3xIndependent
- 2007-2012: No change

Lerwick North - 3 seats
Party	Candidate	FPv%	Count						
Party	Candidate	FPv%	1	2	3	4	5	6	7
Independent	Malcolm Bell	55.93	684						
Independent	Michael Stout	16.93	207	350.3					
Independent	Allan Wishart (incumbent)	12.02	147	230.9	236.7	258.9	273.4	295.8	348.8
SNP	Danus Skene	5.31	65	98.3	102.5	109.3	122.8	142.9	
Independent	Alex Wright	3.76	46	74.3	86.4	88.2	105.1		
Independent	Caroline Miller (incumbent)	2.86	35	51.1	53.3				
Independent	Bill Adams	2.29	28	64.1	75.8	83.3			
Electorate: 2,453 Valid: 1,212 Spoilt: 11 Quota: 304 Turnout: 1,223 (49.86%)

=== Lerwick South ===
- 2007: 4xIndependent
- 2012: 4xIndependent
- 2007-2012: No change

Lerwick South - 4 seats
Party	Candidate	FPv%	Count					
Party	Candidate	FPv%	1	2	3	4	5	6
Independent	Dr Jonathan Wills (incumbent)	36.07	646					
Independent	Cecil Smith (incumbent)	17.81	319	407.3				
Independent	Peter Campbell	14.46	259	310.4	329.9	349.9	388.9	
Independent	Amanda Westlake	12.79	229	280.8	291.9	308.6	346.5	358.9
Independent	Robbie Leith	8.04	144	184.9	188.1	204.6	241.4	248.9
SNP	Iain Morrison	6.64	119	144.7	148.7	157.3		
Independent	Jim Henry (incumbent)	3.24	58	71.1	78.9			
Electorate: 3,507 Valid: 1,774 Spoilt: 11 Quota: 355 Turnout: 1,791 (51.07%)

== Retiring Councillors ==
Council Ward	Departing Councillor	Party
Shetland South	Gussie Angus	Independent
North Isles	Laura Baisley	Independent
Shetland Central	Jim Budge	Independent
Lerwick North	Sandy Cluness	Independent
Shetland North	Addie Doull	Independent
Lerwick Central	Betty Fullerton	Independent
Shetland West	Florence Grains	Independent
Shetland Central	Andrew Hughson	Independent
Shetland North	Bill Manson	Independent
Lerwick North	Rick Nickerson	Independent
North Isles	Josie Simpson	Independent
