= 2007 Shetland Islands Council election =

2007 Scottish local government election

- 3 May 2007

All 22 seats to Shetland Islands Council 12 seats needed for a majority
- Registered: 17,108
- Turnout: 59.0%
	First party
Leader	Sandy Cluness
Party	Independent
Leader's seat	Lerwick North
Last election	17 seats, 76.2%
Seats before	17
Seats won	22
Seat change	▲5
Popular vote	9,249
Percentage	92.8%
Swing	▲16.6%
Council Convener before election
Sandy Cluness
Independent
Council Convener after election
Sandy Cluness
Independent

Results by ward.

Elections to Shetland Islands Council were held on 3 May 2007 the same day as the other Scottish local government elections and the Scottish Parliament general election. The election was the first one using seven new wards created as a result of the Local Governance (Scotland) Act 2004. Each ward elected three or four councillors using the single transferable vote system, a form of proportional representation. The new wards replaced 22 single-member wards which used the plurality (first past the post) system of election. The council was one of only three in Scotland with a majority of elected members who were independents.

== Election results ==
Shetland Islands local election result 2007
Party	Seats	Gains	Losses	Net gain/loss	Seats %	Votes %	Votes	+/−
Independent	22	5	0	▲5	100.0	92.8	9,249	▲16.6
Liberal Democrats	0	0	5	▼5	0.0	3.0	300	▼20.8
Scottish Socialist	0	0	0	0	0.0	2.6	260	New
Conservative	0	0	0	0	0.0	1.6	159	New

== Ward results ==
=== North Isles ===
North Isles – 3 seats
Party	Candidate	FPv%	Count					
Party	Candidate	FPv%	1	2	3	4	5	6
Independent	Josie Simpson (incumbent)	33.5	479					
Independent	Laura Baisley	13.8	197	208	239	264	299	366
Independent	Robert Henderson	10.1	145	172	194	227	260	308
Independent	Brian Gregson (Incumbent)	10.1	145	160	177	199	238	280
Independent	Gordon Williamson	8.8	126	137	151	183	203	
Independent	Laurence Odie	8.2	117	122	133			
Independent	Laurence Robertson	7.9	113	131	149	159		
Independent	Robert Thomson	7.5	107	119				

=== Shetland North ===
Shetland North – 3 seats
Party	Candidate	FPv%	Count					
Party	Candidate	FPv%	1	2	3	4	5	6
Independent	Alastair Cooper	31.6	438					
Independent	Addie Doull	15.5	215	243	248	263	299	350
Independent	Bill Manson (Incumbent)	15.5	214	235	242	253	267	298
Independent	Barbara Cheyne (Incumbent)	13.4	186	198	218	228	239	282
Independent	Kenny Hughson	9.8	135	144	149	159	178	
Independent	Alan MacDonald	5.9	82	85	91	101		
Independent	Daniel Robertson	4.9	68	73	77			
Independent	Joan Easten	3.3	46	49				

=== Shetland West ===
Shetland West – 3 seats
Party	Candidate	FPv%	Count			
Party	Candidate	FPv%	1	2	3	4
Independent	Frank Robertson (Incumbent)	31.6	384			
Independent	Gary Robinson	23.8	289	316		
Independent	Florence Grains (Incumbent)	20.1	245	265	268	327
Independent	Brian Anderson	14.3	174	183	186	222
Independent	Marion Hughson	10.2	124	134	138	

=== Shetland Central ===
Shetland Central – 3 seats
Party	Candidate	FPv%	Count				
Party	Candidate	FPv%	1	2	3	4	5
Independent	Iris Hawkins (Incumbent)	27.2	330				
Independent	Andrew Hughson	25.6	311				
Independent	Betty Fullerton	21.2	257	265	267	276	295
Independent	Ian Scott	10.8	131	133	134	141	150
Independent	Geordie Pottinger	8.1	98	103	104	112	118
Independent	John Hunter	3.8	46	49	50	56	
Independent	Jim Ivens	1.9	23	24	25		
Independent	Scotty Dyble	1.6	19	19	19		

=== Shetland South ===
Shetland South – 3 seats
Party	Candidate	FPv%	Count			
Party	Candidate	FPv%	1	2	3	4
Independent	Allison Duncan	31.6	501			
Independent	Jim Budge	22.1	350	382	395	451
Independent	Rick Nickerson	28.0	286	301	310	364
Liberal Democrats	Gordon Mitchell (Incumbent)	14.2	225	239	271	302
Independent	John Hunter	9.3	148	165	175	
Liberal Democrats	James Friedlander	4.7	75	78		

=== Lerwick North ===
Lerwick North – 3 seats
Party	Candidate	FPv%	Count				
Party	Candidate	FPv%	1	2	3	4	5
Independent	Allan Wishart	39.2	505				
Independent	Sandy Cluness (Incumbent)	20.5	264	312	340		
Independent	Caroline Miller	16.0	206	245	270	277	312
Independent	Bill Adams	9.7	125	149	166	170	233
Scottish Socialist	Kin Learmonth	8.5	110	132	141	143	
Independent	Kathy Greaves	6.1	79	95			

=== Lerwick South ===
Lerwick South – 4 seats
Party	Candidate	FPv%	Count							
Party	Candidate	FPv%	1	2	3	4	5	6	7	8
Independent	Cecil Eunson (incumbent)	26.4	489							
Independent	Gussie Angus	25.6	483							
Independent	Cecil Smith	10.8	199	226	249	269	281	329	428	
Conservative	Maurice Mullay	8.6	159	169	180	182	207	218		
Scottish Socialist	Robbie Leith	8.1	150	164	174	181	195	222	233	242
Independent	Jim Henry (Incumbent)	6.9	127	146	169	172	201	235	268	285
Independent	Michael Peterson	6.3	116	129	137	149	164			
Independent	Geoff Feather (Incumbent)	5.2	97	105	113	118				
Independent	Lindsay Smith	2.2	40	46	52					

== By-elections since 2007 Elections ==
- On 28 February 2008 Independent Dr Jonathan Wills won a by-election which arose following the death of Independent Councillor Cecil Eunson on 25 December 2007.

Lerwick South By-Election (28 February 2008) - 1 seat
Party	Candidate	FPv%	Count						
Party	Candidate	FPv%	1	2	3	4	5	6	7
Independent	Dr Jonathan Wills	25.08	332	335	350	361	402	462	576
Independent	Peter Campbell	17.60	233	240	246	272	317	370	465
Independent	Lyle Williamson	17.22	228	229	234	245	286	337	
Independent	Robbie Leith	13.82	183	188	204	216	228		
Conservative	Maurice Mullay	12.76	169	171	177	199			
Independent	Geoff Feather	6.57	87	91	96				
Independent	Larry Deyell	4.76	63	66					
Independent	Vic Thomas	2.19	29						
Independent hold		Swing							
Electorate: 3,382 Valid: 1,324 Spoilt: 7 Quota: 663 Turnout: 1,331 (39.15%)

- On 15 December 2011 Independent David Sandison won a by-election which arose following the resignation of Independent Councillor Iris Hawkins on 30 September 2011.

Shetland Central By-Election (15 December 2011) - 1 seat
Party	Candidate	FPv%	Count	
Party	Candidate	FPv%	1	2
Independent	David Sandison	48.4	332	352
Independent	Stephen Morgan	16.9	116	124
Independent	Ian Scott	15.6	107	115
Independent	Robert Williamson	10.9	75	81
Conservative	Clive Richardson	4.2	29	
Independent	Scotty van der Tol	3.9	27	
Independent hold		Swing		
Electorate: 2,300 Valid: 686 Spoilt: 4 Quota: 344 Turnout: 690 (30%)
