= Shetland Islands Council =

Local authority for Shetland, Scotland

- Full council election every 5 years
- Coat of arms

- Council logo

History
- Founded: 16 May 1975

Leadership
- Convener: Bryan Peterson, Independent since 25 March 2026
- Leader: Emma Macdonald, Independent since 23 May 2022
- Chief Executive: Maggie Sandison since 28 February 2018

Structure
- Seats: 23 councillors
- Graph of the party split among 23 seats.
- Political groups: All parties (23) Independent (21) Green (1) SNP (1)

Elections
- Voting system: Single transferable vote
- Last election: 5 May 2022
- Next election: 6 May 2027

Motto
- Með lögum skal land byggja (Old Norse: "By law shall the land be built up")

Meeting place
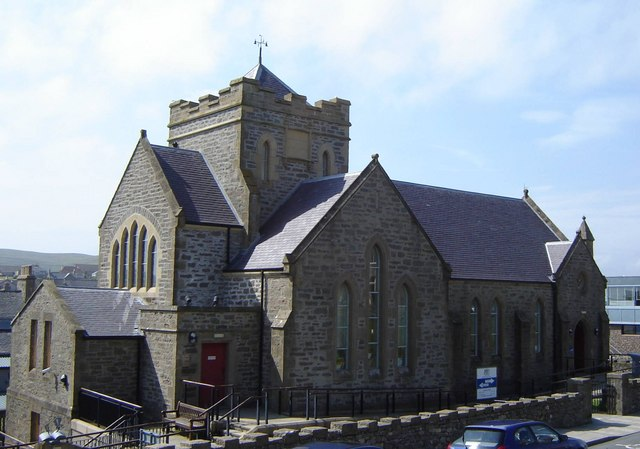
- Council Chamber, Lower Hillhead, Lerwick, Shetland, ZE1 0EL

Website
- www.shetland.gov.uk

Shetland Islands Council (SIC) is the local authority for the Shetland Islands, one of the 32 council areas of Scotland. It was established in 1975 by the Local Government (Scotland) Act 1973 and was largely unaffected by the Scottish local government changes of 1996. The council is based in Lerwick.

It provides services in the areas of Environmental Health, Roads, Social Work, Community Development, Organisational Development, Economic Development, Building Standards, Trading Standards, Housing, Waste, Education, Burial Grounds, Port and Harbours and others. The council collects Council Tax. The Fire Service is part of the Highlands and Islands division of the Scottish Fire and Rescue Service.

== History ==
Shetland had been administered by Commissioners of Supply from 1667 and then by Zetland County Council from 1890 to 1975. The county council was abolished in 1975 and replaced by the Shetland Islands Council, which also took over the functions previously exercised by Shetland's lower-tier authorities, being the town council of the burgh of Lerwick and the councils of the area's landward districts. The new council created in 1975 was an islands council of an area legally called Shetland.

Further local government reform in 1996 introduced single-tier council areas across all of Scotland. The councils of the three island areas created in 1975, including Shetland, continued to provide the same services after 1996, but their areas were re-designated as council areas. The geographic area's legal name was changed from Shetland to 'Shetland Islands' as part of the 1996 reforms, allowing the council to retain the name 'Shetland Islands Council'. The council was a member of the Islands Forum from 2022 until its abolition in 2026.

== Political control ==
The first election was held in 1974, with the council initially operating as a shadow authority alongside the outgoing authorities until the new system came into force on 16 May 1975. A majority of the seats on the council have been held by independent councillors since 1975.

Party in control	Years
Independent	1975–present

=== Leadership ===
The council appoints a convener, who chairs full council meetings and acts as the civic figurehead. In 2011 the separate position of leader of the council was created to provide political leadership. The leaders since 2011 have been:

Councillor	Party	From	To
Josie Simpson	Independent	7 Mar 2011	May 2012
Gary Robinson	Independent	23 May 2012	May 2017
Cecil Smith	Independent	18 May 2017	7 Mar 2018
Steven Coutts	Independent	9 May 2018	May 2022
Emma Macdonald	Independent	23 May 2022	still

The conveners since the council formally came into being in 1975 have been:

Councillor	Party	From	To
Alexander Tulloch	Independent	16 May 1975	3 May 1986
Edward Thomason	Shetland Movement	20 May 1986	May 1994
Lewis Smith	Independent	24 May 1994	May 1999
Tom Stove	Independent	May 1999	May 2003
Sandy Cluness (Note: Sandy Cluness was first elected as a Liberal Democrat councillor in 2003 but stood as an independent candidate in 2007.)	Liberal Democrats	May 2003	2007
Sandy Cluness	Independent	2007	May 2012
Malcolm Bell	Independent	23 May 2012	May 2022
Andrea Manson	Independent	23 May 2022	11 March 2026
Bryan Peterson	Independent	25 March 2026	still

=== Composition ===
Following the 2022 election and subsequent by-elections up to January 2025, the composition of the council was:

Party	Seats
Independent	21
Green	1
SNP	1
Total	23

The next election is due in 2027.

== Elections ==
Since the last boundary changes in 2022, the council has comprised 23 councillors representing 7 wards, with each ward electing two, three or four councillors. Elections are held every five years.

== Premises ==
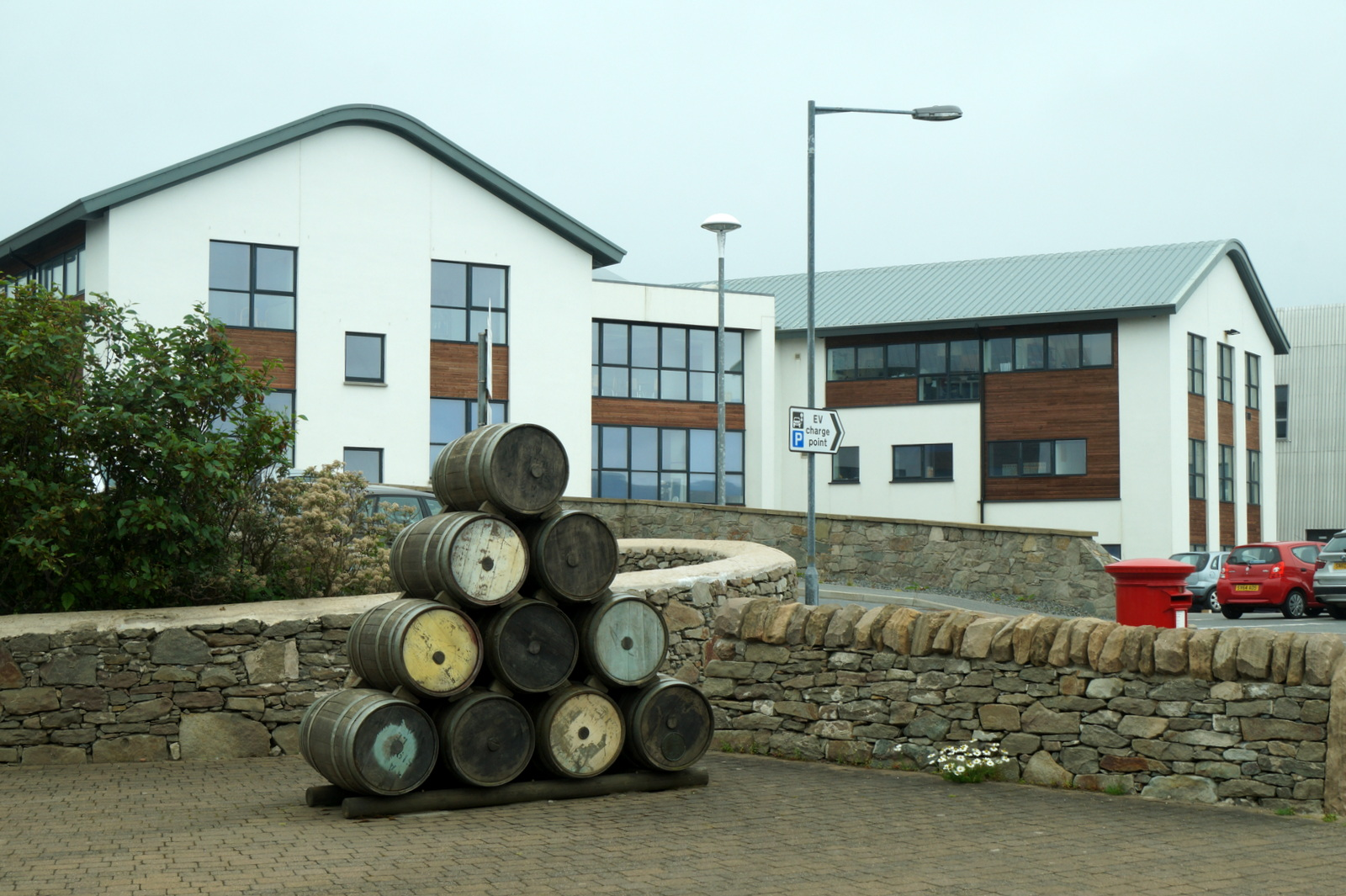
8 North Ness, Lerwick: Council's main offices

Council meetings are held at the Council Chamber on Lower Hillhead in Lerwick. The building was formerly St Ringan's Church and was built in 1886. After the church closed the building was used as a library for some years, before being converted to become the council chamber in 2022. Council meetings were previously held at Lerwick Town Hall.

The council's main offices are at 8 North Ness in Lerwick, overlooking the harbour. The building was completed in 2012 to bring together the council's departments in one building.

== See also ==
- Constitutional status of Orkney, Shetland and the Western Isles
- Lerwick Declaration
