= 2017 Scottish local elections =

- 4 May 2017

All 1,227 seats to 32 Scottish councils
- Turnout: 46.9% (▲7.3%)
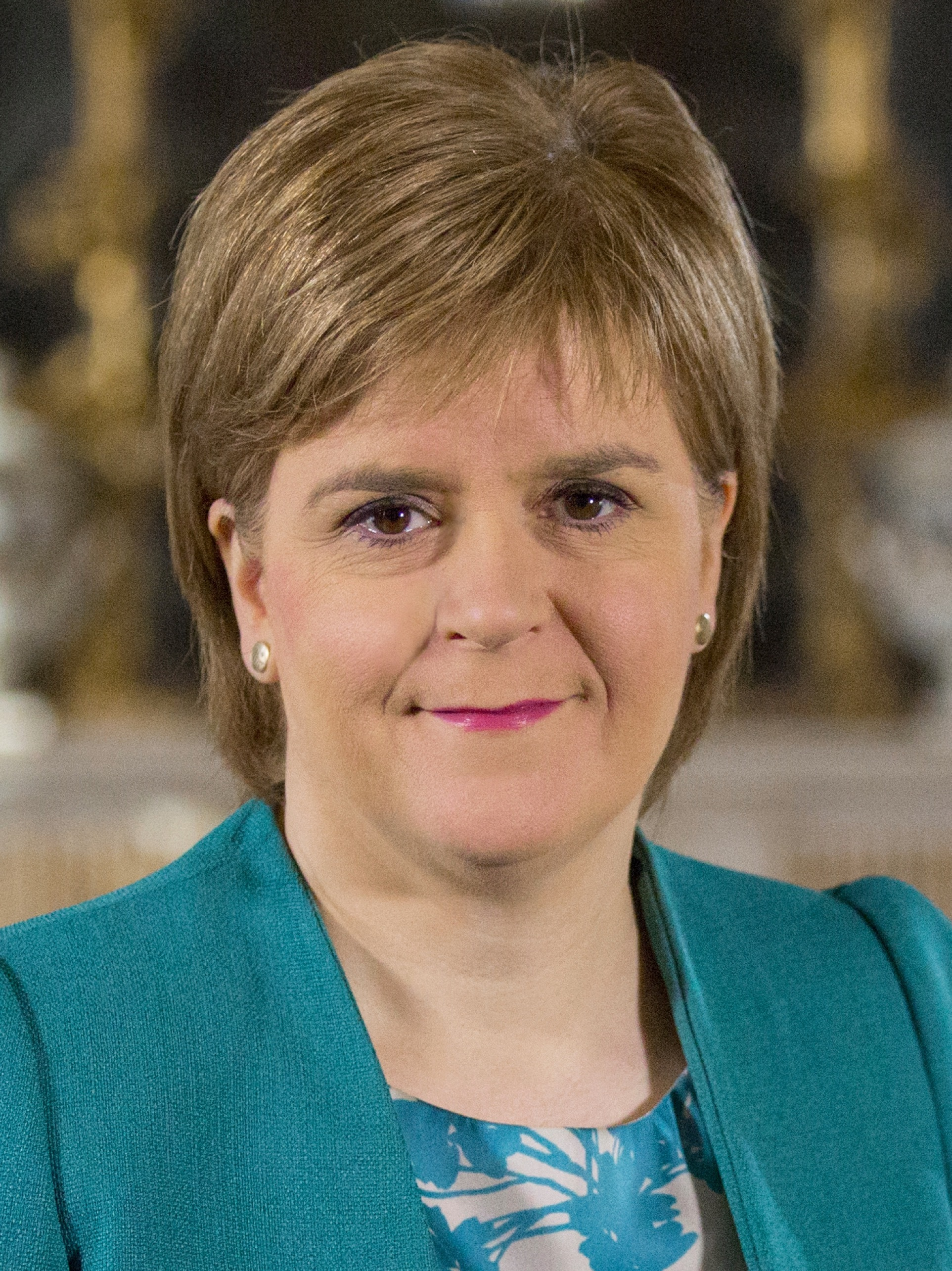

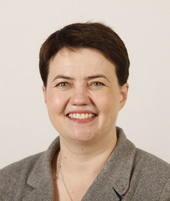

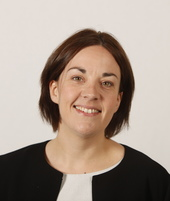

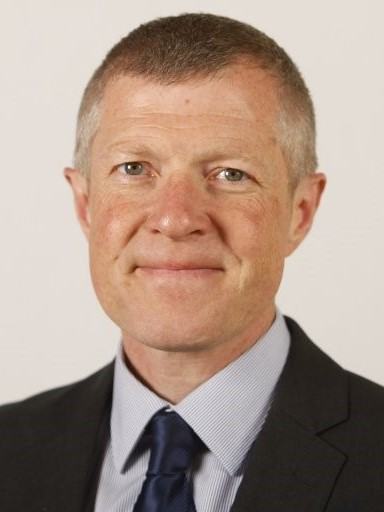
	First party	Second party
Leader	Nicola Sturgeon	Ruth Davidson
Party	SNP	Conservative
Leader since	14 November 2014	4 November 2011
Last election	425 seats, 32.33%	115 seats, 13.27%
Seats before	438	112
Seats won	431	276
Seat change	▼7*	▲164*
First preferences	610,454	478,073
First preferences (%)	32.30%	25.30%
Swing (pp)	▼0.03%	▲12.03%
	Third party	Fourth party
Leader	Kezia Dugdale	Willie Rennie
Party	Labour	Liberal Democrats
Leader since	15 August 2015	17 May 2011
Last election	394 seats, 31.39%	71 seats, 6.62%
Seats before	395	70
Seats won	262	67
Seat change	▼133*	▼3*
First preferences	380,957	128,821
First preferences (%)	20.16%	6.82%
Swing (pp)	▼11.23%	▲0.20%

- Most voted for party by council, largest party by council, and largest party by ward. Ward map utilises the new ward boundaries. * Indicates boundary change - so this is a nominal figure

The 2017 Scottish local elections were held on Thursday 4 May, in all 32 local authorities. The SNP retained its position as the largest party in terms of votes and councillors, despite suffering minor losses. The Conservatives made gains and displaced Labour as the second largest party, while the Liberal Democrats suffered a net loss of councillors despite increasing their share of the vote. Minor parties and independents polled well; and independent councillors retained majority control over the three island councils. For the first time since the local government reforms in 1995, all mainland councils fell under no overall control.

== Background ==
The previous election was in 2012. Normally these elections take place every four years, but this election was postponed for a year in order to avoid conflicting with the 2016 Scottish Parliament election.

Once again the local elections, held under the Single Transferable Vote system, were counted electronically, using the same system used in 2012. The tender was awarded to CGI (formerly Logica) and Idox Elections (formerly Opt2vote), both of which delivered the 2012 elections successfully.

=== Eligibility to vote ===
All registered electors (British, Irish, Commonwealth and European Union citizens) who were aged 16 or over on polling day were entitled to vote in the local elections. A person who had two homes (such as a university student who has a term-time address and lives at home during holidays) could register to vote at both addresses as long as they are not in the same electoral area and can vote for two different councils, albeit only in two different local elections; however, it is an offence to vote twice in the same type of election and doing so may incur a fine of up to £5,000.

Individuals must have registered to vote by midnight twelve working days before polling day (17 April 2017). Anyone who qualified as an anonymous elector had until midnight on 25 April 2017 to register.

== Party performance ==
Following the election, SNP leader Nicola Sturgeon played down the threat posed by the Conservatives to her party, asserting that the good performance by the Conservatives was on account of Labour support going to the Conservatives and not because of any shift in SNP voters.

Scottish Conservative leader Ruth Davidson asserted a "Scottish fightback against the SNP" and said that the results represented a resurgence for the Conservatives, despite the fact that the SNP's 1st preference vote percentage had not changed since the 2012 election.

Scottish Labour leader Kezia Dugdale admitted the results were disappointing for her party, while the Scottish Liberal Democrats leader Willie Rennie said the council results showed his party could stand against the SNP tide in key northern constituencies.

== Aftermath ==
=== Aberdeenshire ===
The Scottish Conservatives returned the most councillors, the first time it has been the largest party in the region since the 1982 election, when the area was under the Grampian Regional Council, although they were stopped short of an overall majority. The number of Scottish National Party councillors fell by a quarter but remained the second largest group. The Scottish Liberal Democrats picked up a couple of seats while the other parties gained roughly the same results as the previous election.

On 18 May, the Conservatives, Liberal Democrats and Aligned Independents formed an administration, with Jim Gifford (Conservative) elected as council leader and Bill Howatson (Liberal Democrat) was made Provost.

=== Argyll and Bute ===
The SNP became the largest party on the council for the first time, as the Independent group lost a third of its seats compared to the previous election. The Conservatives gained five seats and the Liberal Democrats gained two, but both remained in their respective places as the two smaller parties.

Despite the SNP's position, a coalition was formed of Conservatives, Liberal Democrats and Independents, referred to as The Argyll Lomond and the Isles Group (TALIG). Aileen Morton, leader of the group, was elected as council leader.

=== Fife ===
The Scottish National Party replaced Scottish Labour as the largest party for the first time in the Fife region, although they did not gain enough seats to form a majority. The Scottish Conservatives made the most gains, replacing the Scottish Liberal Democrats as the third biggest party. The election also returned no Independent councillors, marking the first time the area will be without any Independent representation since the creation of Fife Regional Council in 1974.

On 18 May, the two largest parties of the new council, the SNP and Scottish Labour, signed a Power Sharing Agreement to co-run an administration. David Alexander (SNP) and David Ross (Labour) were made co-leaders, and Jim Leishman remained in his role as Provost.

=== Glasgow ===
The SNP replaced Labour as the biggest party; although without a majority it ended Labour's 37-year-long control of the council. The Conservatives increased its number of councillors from 1 to 8, their highest since 1984, while the Scottish Green Party also made a couple of gains to reach their highest ever level in Glasgow. This council is the first without any Liberal representation since 1974.

The SNP took control of the council as a minority administration with SNP members filling the positions of council leader, depute council leader, and Lord Provost.

== Councils ==
Council	2012 result: largest party (parties in control)	Control before election (change in control since May 2012, if different)	2017 result: largest party (parties in control)	Details
Aberdeen City	Labour (Lab + Con + Ind)		SNP (Con + Lab)	Details
Aberdeenshire	SNP (Con + LD + Ind)	SNP (SNP + Lab + Ind)	Conservative (Con + LD + Ind)	Details
Angus	SNP (SNP majority)	SNP (SNP minority)	SNP / Independents tie (Ind + Con + LD)	Details
Argyll and Bute	Independent (Ind + SNP)	Independent (Ind + Con + LD)	SNP (Ind + Con + LD)	Details
Clackmannanshire	SNP (SNP minority)		SNP (SNP minority)	Details
Dumfries and Galloway	Labour (Con + SNP)	Labour (Lab minority)	Conservative (Lab + SNP)	Details
Dundee City	SNP (SNP majority)		SNP (SNP + Ind)	Details
East Ayrshire	SNP (SNP + Con)		SNP (SNP minority)	Details
East Dunbartonshire	SNP (Lab + LD + Con)	Labour (Lab + Con minority)	SNP (Con + LD)	Details
East Lothian	Labour (Lab + Con)		Labour (Lab minority)	Details
East Renfrewshire	Labour (Lab + SNP + Ind)		Conservative (Lab + SNP)	Details
City of Edinburgh	Labour (Lab + SNP)		SNP (Lab + SNP)	Details
Falkirk	Labour (Lab + Con + Ind)		SNP (SNP + Ind minority)	Details
Fife	Labour (Lab minority)		SNP (Lab + SNP)	Details
Glasgow City	Labour (Lab majority)		SNP (SNP minority)	Details
Highland	Independent (SNP + LD + Lab)	Independent (Ind minority)	Independent (Ind + LD + Lab)	Details
Inverclyde	Labour (Lab w/ Ind + Con support)		Labour (Lab minority)	Details
Midlothian Council	Labour (SNP + Green + Ind)		Labour (Lab minority)	Details
Moray	SNP (Ind + Con)		SNP (Con + Ind)	Details
Na h-Eileanan Siar	Independent		Independent	Details
North Ayrshire	SNP (SNP minority)	Labour (Lab minority)	Labour / SNP tie (Lab minority)	Details
North Lanarkshire	Labour (Lab majority)		SNP (Lab minority)	Details
Orkney	Independent		Independent	Details
Perth and Kinross	SNP (SNP w/ Con support)		Conservative (Con + LD + Ind)	Details
Renfrewshire	Labour (Lab majority)		SNP (SNP minority)	Details
Scottish Borders	Conservative (SNP + Ind + LD)		Conservative (Con + Ind)	Details
Shetland	Independent		Independent	Details
South Ayrshire	Conservative (Con w/ Lab + Ind support)		Conservative (SNP + Lab + Ind)	Details
South Lanarkshire	Labour (Lab + LD + Con)	Labour (Lab majority)	SNP (SNP minority)	Details
Stirling	SNP (Lab + Con)		Conservative / SNP tie (Lab + SNP)	Details
West Dunbartonshire	Labour (Lab majority)		SNP (SNP + Ind minority)	Details
West Lothian	Labour (Lab w/ Con + Ind support)		SNP (Lab w/ Con support)	Details

== Opinion polling ==
Date(s) conducted	Polling organisation/client	Sample size	SNP	Lab	Con	Lib Dem	Green	UKIP	Others	Lead
4 May 2017	2017 Scottish local elections	–	32.3%	20.2%	25.3%	6.8%	2.3%	0.2%	15.2%	6.9%
24 Feb – 6 Mar 2017	Ipsos MORI/STV	1,029	46%	17%	19%	6%	8%	3%	<1%	27%
7–13 Feb 2017	Panelbase/Wings Over Scotland	1,028	47%	14%	26%	5%	4%	3%	<1%	21%
3 May 2012	2012 Scottish local elections	–	32.3%	31.4%	13.3%	6.6%	2.3%	0.3%	13.8%	0.9%

== Results ==
Summary of the 4 May 2017 Scottish council election results
Party	First-preference votes			Councils	+/-	2012 seats		2017 seats		Seat change
Party	First-preference votes			Councils	+/-	Seats won	Notional	Seats won	Seat %	vs Notional
SNP	610,454	32.3%	0.0%	0	▼1	425	438	431	35.1%	▼7
Conservative	478,073	25.3%	▲12.0%	0	Steady	115	112	276	22.5%	▲164
Labour	380,957	20.2%	▼11.4%	0	▼3	394	395	262	21.4%	▼133
Independents	196,438	10.4%	▼1.4%	3	Steady	196	198	168	14.1%	▼30
Liberal Democrats	130,243	6.9%	▲0.3%	0	Steady	71	70	67	5.5%	▼3
Green	77,682	4.1%	▲1.8%	0	Steady	14	14	19	1.6%	▲5
Orkney Manifesto Group	894	0.0%		0	Steady			2	0.1%	New
West Dunbartonshire Community	2,413	0.1%		0	Steady			1	0.1%	New
The Rubbish Party	784	0.0%		0	Steady			1	0.1%	New
UKIP	2,920	0.2%	▼0.1%	0	Steady				0.0%	Steady
Independent Alliance North Lanarkshire	2,823	0.2%		0	Steady				0.0%	Steady
TUSC	1,403	0.1%		0	Steady				0.0%	Steady
A Better Britain – Unionist Party	1,196	0.1%		0	Steady				0.0%	Steady
Scottish Socialist	928	0.0%	▼0.3%	0	Steady	1		0	0.0%	▼1
Solidarity	883	0.0%		0	Steady				0.0%	Steady
Libertarian	776	0.0%		0	Steady				0.0%	Steady
RISE	186	0.0%		0	Steady				0.0%	Steady
Scottish Independent Network	145	0.0%		0	Steady				0.0%	Steady
Scottish Unionist	129	0.0%		0	Steady				0.0%	Steady
Social Democratic	112	0.0%		0	Steady				0.0%	Steady
Scottish Christian	104	0.0%		0	Steady				0.0%	Steady
Socialist Labour	76	0.0%		0	Steady				0.0%	Steady
National Front	39	0.0%		0	Steady				0.0%	Steady
No Overall Control	—	—	—	29	▲4	—	—	—	—	—
Total	1,889,658	100.0	±0.0	32	Steady	1,223	1,227	1,227	100.00	Steady

The table has been arranged according to popular vote, not the number of seats won.

=== Boundary changes ===
Prior to the 2017 elections, changes were made to council ward boundaries in 25 council areas. This meant that comparisons with the actual results from 2012 were inaccurate due to a small increase in the total number of seats (from 1,223 to 1,227), different boundaries, and some wards having their number of councillors adjusted. These changes led BBC News, using work done by Professor David Denver of Lancaster University, to estimate what the results would have been in 2012 if the new boundaries and seat numbers had been in place for that election.

=== Analysis ===
Candidates elected on first preferences, by party (2017)
Party	Total elected	Elected on 1st prefs		
Party	Total elected	Total	%	% (2007)
Conservative	276	170	61.6	40.0
Labour	262	76	29.0	50.5
Liberal Democrats	67	19	28.4	28.2
SNP	431	149	34.6	43.5
Green	19	4	21.1	7.1
Independent	168	51	30.4	39.5
Other	4	3	75.0	50.0
Totals	1,227	472	38.5	43.5

Average first terminal transfer rates (2017) (Note: the first terminal transfer of a major party candidate in a ward, where all of the other parties still had a candidate in the count)
Transferred from	% non-transferable	% transferred to				
Transferred from	% non-transferable	Con	Lab	LD	SNP	Ind/Other
Conservative	33.4	–	17.7	27.7	2.9	18.4
Labour	29.6	11.9	–	25.6	13.9	19.0
Liberal Democrats	19.0	21.6	26.4	–	11.5	21.7
SNP	28.6	2.1	13.0	8.9	–	46.3

== See also ==
- 2017 United Kingdom local elections
- 2017 Welsh local elections
- 2017 Northern Ireland Assembly election
