= Alex Cole-Hamilton =

Scottish politician (born 1977)

Alex Cole-Hamilton MSP
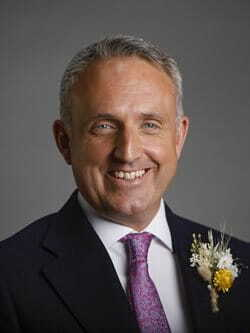
- Official portrait, 2026

Leader of the Scottish Liberal Democrats
- Incumbent
- Assumed office 20 August 2021
- Deputy: Alistair Carmichael; Wendy Chamberlain
- UK party leader: Ed Davey
- Preceded by: Willie Rennie (Note: Alistair Carmichael acted from 20 July to 20 August 2021)

Member of the Scottish Parliament for Edinburgh North Western Edinburgh Western (2016–2026)
- Incumbent
- Assumed office 5 May 2016
- Preceded by: Colin Keir
- Majority: 13,016 (32.4%)

Scottish Liberal Democrat portfolios
- 2021–2026: Constitution and External Affairs
- 2024–2026: the Drugs Emergency
- 2021–2026: Social Care
- 2021: Sport
- 2016–2021: Health

Personal details
- Born: Alexander Geoffrey Cole-Hamilton; 22 July 1977 (age 49) Hertfordshire, England
- Party: Scottish Liberal Democrats
- Education: University of Aberdeen
- Website: Official website

Alexander Geoffrey Cole-Hamilton (born 22 July 1977) is a Scottish politician (Note: Cole-Hamilton was born in England and moved to Scotland as a child. He has described himself as "a proud Scot.") who has served as leader of the Scottish Liberal Democrats since 2021. Cole-Hamilton has been the member of the Scottish Parliament (MSP) for Edinburgh North Western (previously Edinburgh Western) since 2016.

Born in England, Cole-Hamilton moved to Scotland when he was eight, where his family was politically active. After attending Madras College, Cole-Hamilton studied politics and international relations at the University of Aberdeen. Upon graduation, he worked primarily in the children's and social care sectors, and remained active within the Liberal Democrats. After several unsuccessful candidacies, Cole-Hamilton secured a seat for himself in the Scottish Parliament in the 2016 elections, representing Edinburgh Western as a Liberal Democrat. After the 2021 parliamentary elections produced the worst results in the party's history, Cole-Hamilton was unanimously elected to lead the Scottish Liberal Democrats in August 2021. He led the party through the 2022 local elections, and helped oversee the party's 2024 general election campaign in Scotland. In the 2026 Scottish parliamentary election, Cole-Hamilton led the party to gain six seats, earning a total of ten in Holyrood.

Cole-Hamilton describes himself as a liberal and progressive. He is opposed to Scotland holding another independence referendum. Cole-Hamilton is considered to be a close ally of Sir Ed Davey, leader of the Liberal Democrats.

== Early life and career ==
Cole-Hamilton was born in Hertfordshire, England, the son of inorganic chemist Dr David John Cole-Hamilton, FRSE, FRSC, a lecturer at the University of Liverpool and speech therapist and marine archaeological academic Elizabeth Ann, daughter of RCNVR officer and government employee Bruce Lloyd Brown (1914–2002), of Victoria, British Columbia, Canada, grandson of Alexander Brown, co-founder of Christie, Brown and Company, the largest Canadian manufacturer of biscuits. His great-grandfather Richard Cole-Hamilton was Archdeacon of Brecon from 1947 to 1955. The Cole-Hamiltons descend from Arthur Cole-Hamilton, younger son of the Irish politician John Cole, 1st Baron Mountflorence, of Florence Court, whose eldest son and heir, William, was created Earl of Enniskillen. Relatives include Anni Cole-Hamilton, founder of the private Moray Firth School, and Air Vice Marshal John Cole-Hamilton.

Cole-Hamilton's family moved from Lancashire to Scotland when he was eight years old. He attended Madras College, a state school in St Andrews. At the age of nine, Cole-Hamilton’s father had him delivering leaflets for Menzies Campbell, the Liberal running to represent the Scottish constituency of North East Fife, during the 1987 general election. He attended the University of Aberdeen, studying international relations. During a May 2026 interview, he revealed that he was approached by the Foreign Office upon graduating from university with an offer to work at an embassy and potentially conduct “diplomatic service outside of the normal bounds” for MI6, ultimately turning down the offer due to his Quaker faith.

In 2000, he was appointed to the role of constituency organiser in the Liberal Democrat-held constituency of Edinburgh West. He went on to work for the Liberal Democrats in the Scottish Parliament until late 2003, when he was appointed as a policy and communications officer in the children’s voluntary sector. He worked for various organisations until his election in 2016, including YouthLink Scotland and Aberlour Child Care Trust. During this time he was also a Director of and then latterly the Convener of "Together (Scottish Alliance for Children's Rights)". Cole-Hmailton says his work in the children’s sector inspired him to run for office.

As part of "Operation Clark County", Cole-Hamilton wrote to a voter in Clark County, Ohio in an attempt to influence the 2004 United States presidential election.

== Political career ==
=== Early career and Scottish Parliament ===
Cole-Hamilton stood in several constituencies unsuccessfully as a Lib Dem candidate: at the 2003 Scottish Parliament election for the Kirkcaldy constituency; at the 2005 general election for Kirkcaldy and Cowdenbeath; in 2007 for Stirling and in 2011 for Edinburgh Central.

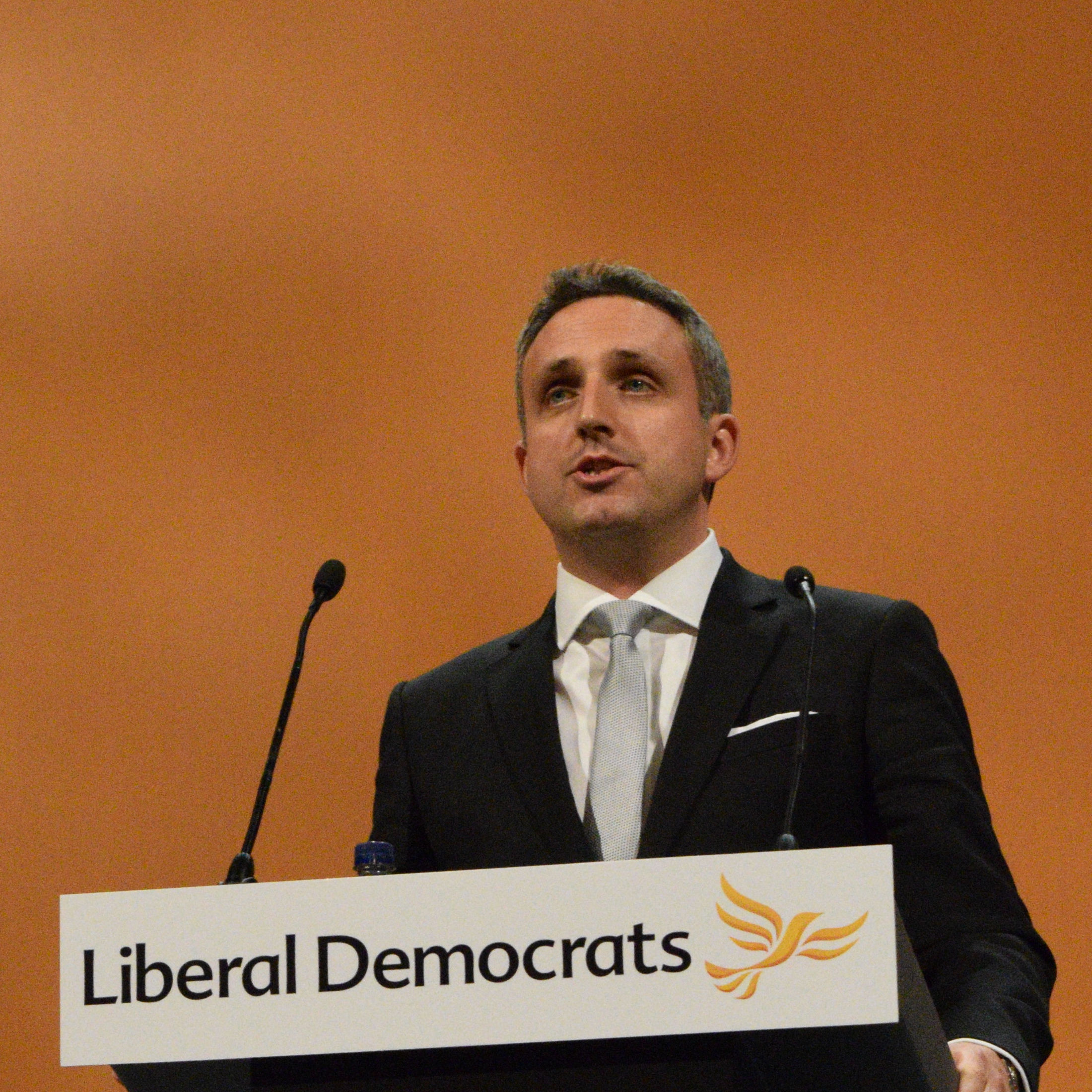
Cole-Hamilton addressing a Liberal Democrat conference in the Bournemouth International Centre in 2017.

Following the 2015 general election, Deputy Prime Minister and Liberal Democrat Leader Nick Clegg quoted Cole-Hamilton when delivering his resignation speech. He referred to the 2011 Scottish Parliament election, saying "In 2011 after a night of disappointing election results for our party in Edinburgh, Alex Cole-Hamilton said this: if his defeat was part-payment for the ending of child detention, then he accepted it with all his heart. Those words revealed a selfless dignity which is very rare in politics, but common amongst Liberal Democrats."

In May 2016, Cole-Hamilton was elected to the Scottish Parliament for the Edinburgh Western constituency. After the election, he was made Liberal Democrat in Scotland spokesperson for Health. Cole-Hamilton's 2016 electoral expenses were investigated in June of the following year, according to the Edinburgh Evening News: "Mr Cole-Hamilton recorded the highest election costs of any Edinburgh candidate, spending £32,549 on his campaign while his rival for the Edinburgh Western seat, SNP candidate Tony Giugliano, spent £18,593." While Cole-Hamilton was cleared of any wrongdoing, the party was fined for failing to file an accurate spending return on its national spending return. He received the 'one to watch' award at the Herald – Scottish Politician of the Year Awards in August 2016.

In 2018, Cole-Hamilton successfully persuaded the Scottish Government to reverse a planned funding cut to HIV Scotland that would have sunk that organisation. In 2020, during parliamentary deliberation of the first Coronavirus Act, Cole-Hamilton introduced amendments which forced a government U-turn on their proposals to abolish jury trials in Scotland for the duration of the emergency.

From 2019 until March 2021, he was a member of the Committee on the Scottish Government Handling of Harassment Complaints against the former First Minister, Alex Salmond. He later described his time with the committee as "a very dark experience."

In February 2021, Cole-Hamilton was forced to apologise after having been seen swearing at Minister for Children and Young People Maree Todd during an online committee hearing. He wrote Todd a letter of apology, as well as publicly apologising in the Holyrood Chamber the week after, saying his language was “neither parliamentary nor respectful.” The National reported in February 2024 that revisions to Cole-Hamilton’s Wikipedia article relating to the incident were ‘removed’ via a computer in the Scottish Parliament.

At the 2021 Scottish Parliament election, Cole-Hamilton received 25,578 votes, the highest number of votes ever cast for a single candidate in a Scottish Parliament election. He beat the runner-up, SNP candidate Sarah Masson, by 9,885 votes.

=== Leader of the Scottish Liberal Democrats ===
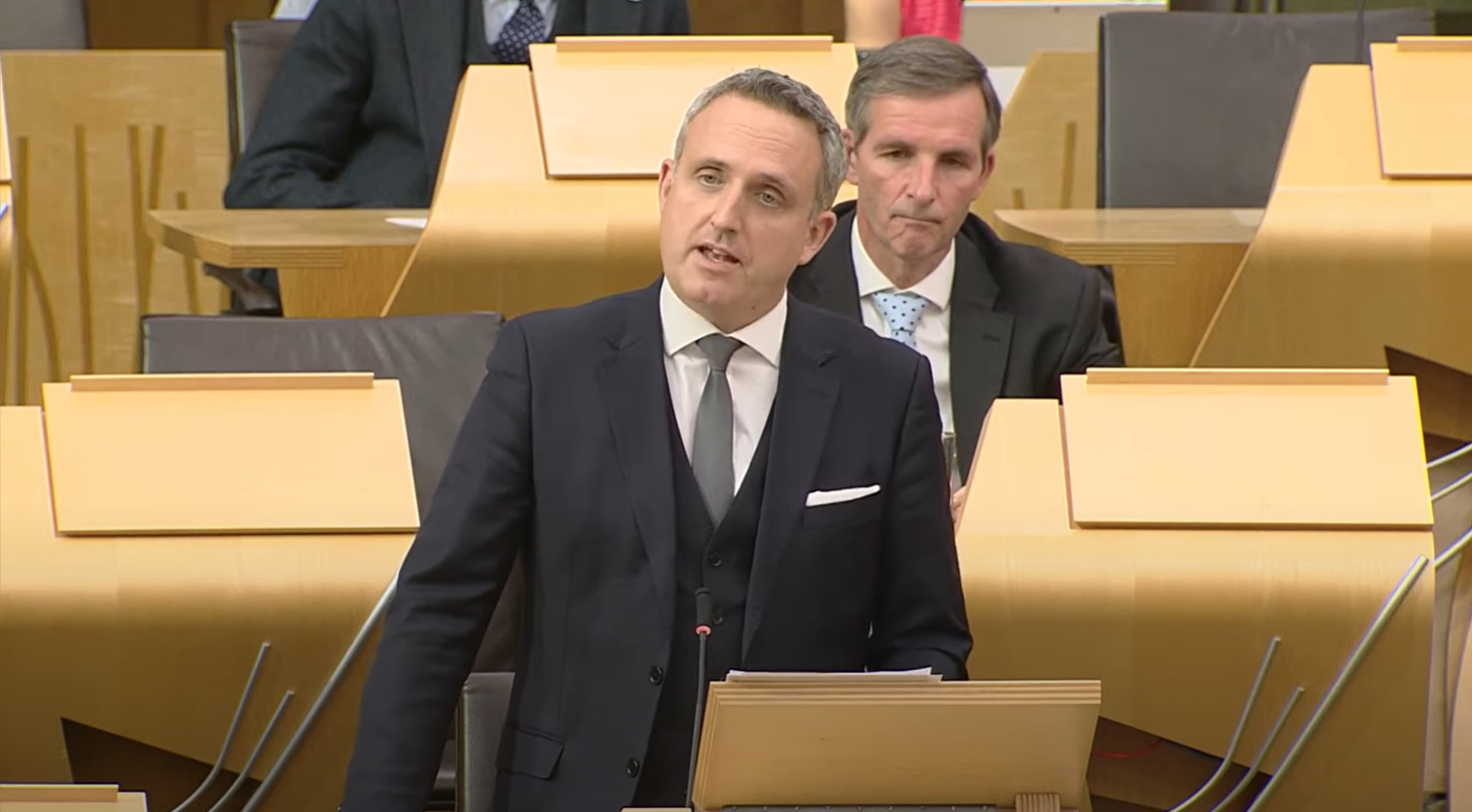
Cole-Hamilton speaking in the Scottish Parliament in May 2024.

On 27 July 2021, Cole-Hamilton announced his intention to stand in the upcoming Scottish Liberal Democrats leadership election to replace Willie Rennie. He won the election unopposed on 20 August 2021 and took office the same day. Upon his election as leader, Cole-Hamilton led just 3 other MSPs, the party’s lowest representation since the creation of the Scottish parliament. He said the party would support environmentalist policies, avoid nationalism, advocate for minorities, and seek to improve education.

In April 2022, he unveiled the party’s manifesto for the 2022 local elections. Commitments included a replacement for the council tax and opposing Holyrood setting policies for local services, including social work, children's services, community justice and alcohol and drug services. Cole-Hamilton sought to center the party’s campaign around political decentralisation, and said the LibDems would support giving councillors more control over local tax rates and spending decisions, as well as transport, planning, energy and housing decisions. The elections saw an increase of 20 councillors to 87, and increased vote share to 8.7% for the LibDems.

He has prioritised campaigning on children's mental health, long covid, tackling the climate crisis and supporting Ukrainian refugees. He was sanctioned by the Kremlin in August 2022 following his public criticism of the Russian invasion of Ukraine, and his efforts to highlight Russian influence in Scotland.

"I take a lot of heat, I take a lot of fire, but I give back as well. I am quite happy to take on some introspection about how I behave, but I am not going to just roll over and leave my country to zealot nationalists who would rather tear apart the things I care about than stand up for the people who really need help in this country."

- Alex Cole-Hamilton, 14 August 2021

Cole-Hamilton spoke at an Oxford Union debate on Scottish independence on 24 February 2023, during which he compared the Yes movement with the push for Brexit. This was criticised by Corri Wilson, deputy general secretary of the independence-supporting Alba Party.

In December 2023, Cole-Hamilton was criticised after he attempted to take part in a parliamentary debate through video link from outside the parliamentary bar.

He disagreed with First Minister John Swinney's attempts to exclude Reform UK from a across-party summit to counter the far-right, telling BBC Scotland that he had “deep concerns about anything which aims to stifle a democratically elected voice" preferring instead to defeat arguments he disagrees with in "open ground". In 2025, he helped initiate a government summit to address a shortage in ADHD medications. In April 2025, he took part in the ‘Initiative to bring Scotland together - democracy and respect’ summit convened by John Swiney.

In February 2026, the SNP’s £68 billion budget proposal for 2026 to 2027 passed with support from the Liberal Democrats. Cole-Hamilton explained at his party’s spring conference that month that the party had "squeezed every penny we could" after securing a £300 million funding package for their key priorities, among them being a 10% increase in payments to colleges, as well as more money for hospices, autism services and ADHD assessments, as well as increased support for the hospitality sector. He argued the budget agreement showed that his party was ‘are serious about getting stuff done’ and praised MSP Jaimie Greene for leading negotiations with the SNP, describing the budget as an opportunity “too important to miss”.

==== 2024 general election ====
Cole-Hamilton declined a meeting with then-First Minister Humza Yousaf, after he was invited to meet in hopes of gathering Liberal Democrat support for Yousaf against a no-confidence motion that would ultimately topple his government. Upon Yousaf’s resignation as First Minister in May 2024, Cole-Hamilton submitted his name for nomination as Scotland's next FM. He received four votes at the First Minister selection, losing to John Swinney who succeeded Yousaf as the leader of the SNP.

After Rishi Sunak called a general election on 22 May, Cole-Hamilton began campaigning for the Lib Dems, looking to “tear down the acid yellow wall of the SNP”. Cole-Hamilton said the campaign would purposely avoid mentioning Scottish independence as an issue. He instead prioritized housing, education, and NHS dental care among other issues. Cole-Hamilton represented the Lib Dems in a STV debate on 3 June, the first debate of the general election. He participated in another debate on 11 June hosted by BBC Scotland. On 17 June, Cole-Hamilton unveiled the Scottish Lib Dems manifesto, which called for more funding for local agriculture, a new minimum wage for care workers, and more support to mental health services, among other issues. He also promised to cut energy bills and fix Scotland's "broken" relationship with Europe. During the campaign, Cole-Hamilton pitched his party’s prospective MPs as being 'local community champions’.

On 26 June, he said he had placed bets on elections in Scottish constituencies, describing them as "low-level bets" to "show confidence in my friends".

In the 2024 election the Lib Dems won 72 seats, the most ever in its history. The party won 6 seats in Scotland, gaining two in Inverness, Skye and West Ross-shire and Mid Dunbartonshire from the SNP. The former (previously known as Ross, Skye and Lochaber) was held by former Lib Dem leader Charles Kennedy from 2005 to 2015. Cole-Hamilton celebrated the results, declaring “There are far more liberals than nationalists on the benches of the House Commons today.”

==== 2026 Scottish Parliament election ====
“Scotland’s got so much going for it, but right now it just feels like nothing’s working. People are tired and frustrated, they’ve been let down by the other parties, and we think they deserve better than that. But it needs to be a vision with change, with fairness in its heart.”

- Alex Cole-Hamilton, April 2026

In April 2025, he welcomed former Conservative MSP Jamie Greene into the Scottish Liberal Democrats, who cited the rise of “right-wing populism” in his former party as the reason for his defection. Cole-Hamilton described Greene an "effective communicator" who possessed "symmetry with our outlook and our values as a party". Cole-Hamilton would later write that Greene's defection to the Lib Dems "felt like a scene from a John le Carré spy novel." Speaking on the BBC’s The Sunday Show, Cole-Hamilton asserted he was comfortable with centre-right MSPs being a part of the Liberal Democrats. He also predicted that more defections would follow, believing Greene's actions spoke to a greater 'realignment' in Scottish politics. At the party's spring conference held that same month, Cole-Hamilton announced that they would prioritise The Highlands at the next Holyrood election, specifically targeting the seats of Kate Forbes and Maree Todd of the SNP. Forbes stood down before the 2026 election, while the seat of Maree Todd would be won by Liberal Democrat David Green.

Results of the 2026 Scottish Parliament election. The Scottish Liberal Democrats gained six seats, winning a total of ten.

In September 2025, he predicted the LibDems would overtake the Tories at the next Holyrood election. At the Liberal Democrats national autumn party conference held in Bournemouth on 21 September 2025, Cole-Hamilton pledged that the party would overtake the Scottish Tories in Holyrood, and urged disaffected moderate conservatives to support the Scottish LibDems. He also committed to not forming a coalition with the SNP after the election, as well as with the Conservatives and Reform. He did not rule out a potential coalition with Labour, and said he was open to serving as Deputy First Minister. He described the state of the health service as his party's “number one issue” in the election, and said the party would also campaign on tackling the cost of living by advocating to bring down energy bills. The LibDems also focused on improving infrastructure and reforming education during the campaign. Cole-Hamilton often encouraged voters to use their “second, peach-coloured, regional ballot paper” in order to elect regional Liberal Democrat MSPs.

In his party’s spring conference held in February 2026, Cole-Hamilton re-affirmed his belief that the LibDems would beat the SNP “right across Scotland”. He told the party conference that “the next 10 weeks could be the most important in our party’s history”, adding that “the coming election is wide open”. The party would target 10 constituency seats during the campaign, seeking to deprive the SNP a majority in the Scottish Parliament in a bid to “reclaim” the Highlands. Cole-Hamilton said the party would pursue education policy in Holyrood, including investing in pupil support assistants and specialist support for speech and language therapists, as well as phone-free classrooms. In April, the party launched its 96-page manifesto, accompanied by the slogan ‘Change with fairness at its heart’. Cole-Hamilton said the party would pursue increased funding for social care policies as well as various infrastructure projects, billing their plan as realistic and focussed primarily on the cost of living. The manifesto also included a pledge to help provide unpaid carers with a £400 uplift in their support payments. BBC News Scotland political correspondent Phil Sim wrote the manifesto "strikes me not such as a prospectus for government, but a menu of bargaining chips that can be deployed in negotiations down the road". Cole-Haimilton continued to insist the LibDems would win seats directly from the SNP. He predicted a “massive leap forward” in the election, claiming the party could at least double their seat share in the Parliament.

The LibDems would come 3 seats short of overtaking the Tories in Holyrood, although they were one of only three parties to make gains, along with the Greens and Reform. The party gained six seats, more than doubling their original seat share to secure a total of ten in the Parliament. They won seven constituency seats, the second most following the SNP. Cole-Hamilton held his own Edinburgh North Western seat, with a comfortable margin of 22,959 votes.

== Political views ==
“I was sent to parliament by my constituents in record-breaking numbers to oppose a second independence referendum...I have my instructions, I will honour that mandate. Why would I support the means of enabling a policy I’m implacably opposed to?”

- Alex Cole-Hamilton

Cole-Hamilton identifies as a liberal, and is opposed to the centralization of power in the state. He is against the establishment of the National Care Service, a proposed publicly funded system of social care, as a matter of principle. Cole-Hamilton also said he would oppose any attempts at implementing identification cards, following Prime Minister Keir Starmer’s attempt to implement a mandatory digital id cards across the United Kingdom in September 2025, describing it as a potential “honey pot for hackers and agents of a hostile power”. He also cited concerns over potential abuse of power by the government, privacy concerns, logistical challenges, and the high costs of implementing such a plan.

He opposes nationalism, and has argued against Scotland holding another independence referendum, arguing that Scottish people are "exhausted" with constitutional questions. Cole-Hamilton, who was born in England but has lived in Scotland since childhood, has criticised the SNP's characterisation of Scottish nationalism as a civic nationalist movement, describing it as a "movement which repeatedly castigates my English origins, flips out about flags on strawberry boxes and smashes up tea cakes with a hammer". Despite his opposition to the SNP, he praised then-First Minister Nicola Surgeon for her response to the COVID-19 pandemic.

Cole-Hamilton supported the Assisted Dying for Terminally ill Adults Bill, which ultimately failed to pass in the Scottish Parliament.

Rather than austerity, Cole-Hamilton has argued that streamlining planning approvals, improving skills provision, and building more homes, coupled with strengthening economic relations with the European Union via a bespoke customs union and youth mobility agreements, as means of driving economic growth. He has suggested, as an alternative to welfare, supporting people through access to childcare and other programs to allow them to take up training opportunities.

Originally a self-described skeptic of nuclear energy, Cole-Hamilton began advocating for nuclear power and called for the Scottish Government to build a new generation of lower-cost reactors in 2026. He opposes fracking.

Despite belonging to different parties, he has described Scottish Labour leader Anas Sawar as “one of my closest friends in politics”. He described Keir Starmer’s Labour government as "terribly disappointing" in September 2025.

He is an admirer of former U.S. Presidents John F. Kennedy and Barack Obama. He has described former Liberal Democrat leader Charles Kennedy as "my mentor and my friend". The Scotsman wrote in 2026 that leader of the Liberal Democrats Sir Ed Davey is “a close ally and friend” of Cole-Hamilton.

=== Foreign issues ===
He has described U.S. President Donald Trump as a "gangster... who is making our world less safe".

In April 2025, he suggested that Scotland should help fund drone production and body armour for Ukrainian soldiers to aid in their efforts during the Russian invasion that began in 2022. Around Easter 2025, Cole-Hamilton joined several other MSPs of various parties in helping the non-profit Mighty Convoy deliver five NHS ambulances in-person to the armed forces of Ukraine for immediate use. While in Ukraine, they met with Andriy Sadovyi, the Mayor of Lviv. It was initially reported that the ambulances would be used on “the frontline” of the war, but this was not the case.

Cole-Hamilton opposed British involvement in the 2026 Iran War, instigated by the United States that March, arguing it violated international law. He criticized Conservative Party leader Kemi Badenoch for supporting hypothetical offensive action by the British Armed Forces, although he agreed that Iran should never possess nuclear weapons.

=== Activity in foreign politics ===
Cole-Hamilton has taken part in election campaigns outside of the United Kingdom, as part of a "healthy democratic tradition of solidarity among Liberal parties around the world helping each other out".

In 2002, Cole-Hamilton was dispatched by the Liberal Democrats to aid their sister party, the Seychellois Democratic Alliance, during the Seychelles first democratic, multi-party elections. He befriended party leader Wavel Ramkalawan, who was with Cole-Hamilton when he survived an assassination attempt during the campaign, and later served as President of the Seychelles from 2020 to 2025.

In October 2024, Cole-Hamilton announced he would be campaigning in the American swing state of Pennsylvania to knock on doors for the presidential campaign of Vice President Kamala Harris, the Democratic Party nominee in the 2024 election. He said he and three other Liberal Democrats booked flights as soon as Joe Biden suspended his campaign in July, and described the election as “one of the most important elections in global history.” Cole-Hamilton also campaigned for Barack Obama during his 2008 presidential campaign.

== Personal life ==
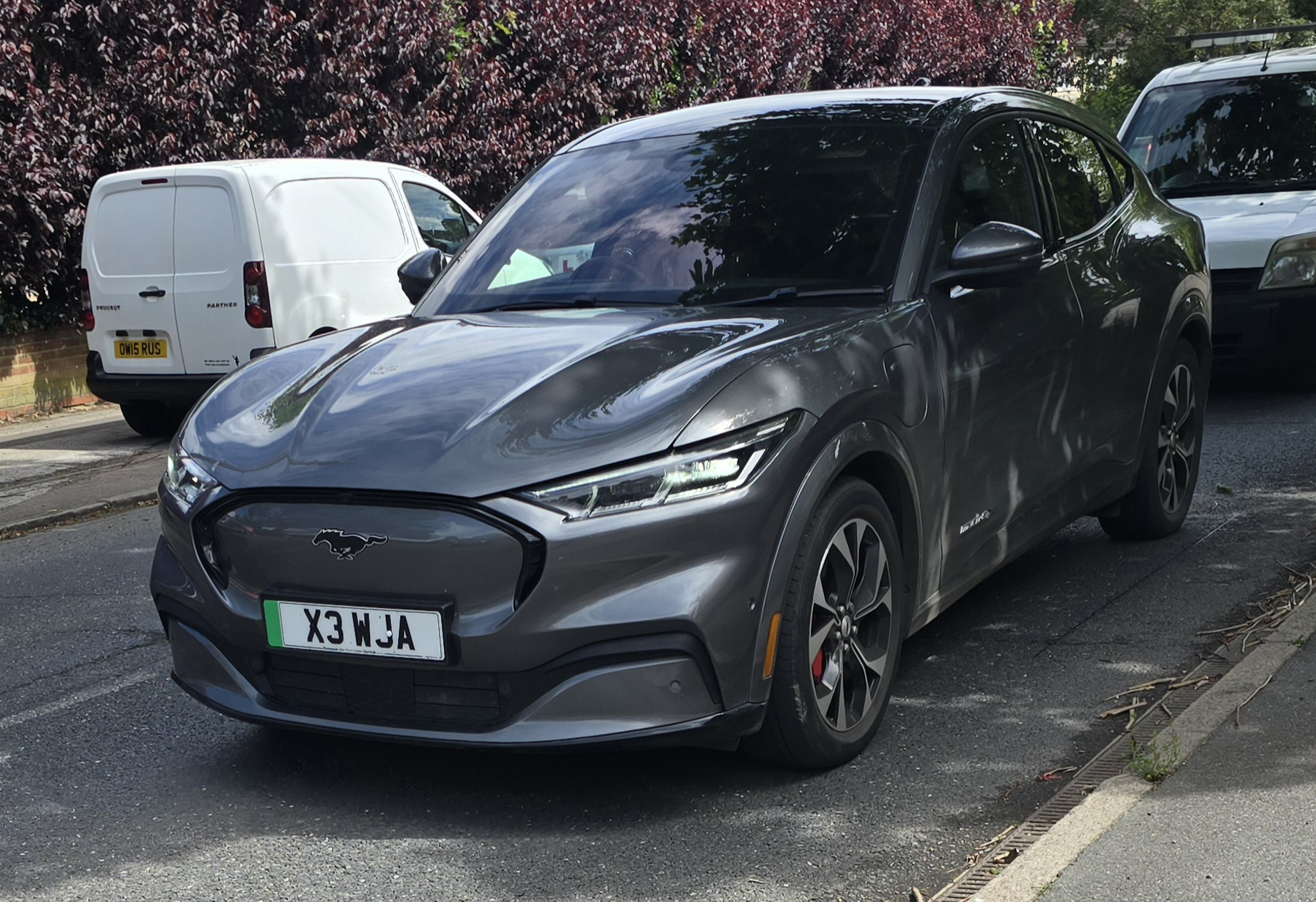
A model similar to the Ford Mustang Mach-E that Cole-Hamilton owns.

Cole-Hamilton is married to his wife, Gillian, a primary school teacher and Liberal Democrat candidate. They live in Blackhall, Edinburgh and have three children. In 2019, he resuscitated his daughter after she swallowed a 50c Euro coin. He used the publicity around this to raise awareness of the importance of infant first aid and organised several first aid training events in his constituency.

Cole-Hamilton was raised as a Quaker, but describes himself as "not very religious". His relatives include John Cole-Hamilton was Provost of Kilwinning from 1940 until 1947, deputy lord lieutenant for the County of Ayr in 1951, and chairman of the Central Ayrshire Conservative Party when that constituency was formed, and Richard Cole-Hamilton, former chief executive of the Clydesdale Bank. He has a sister, with whom he stayed with in New York while campaigning for Kamala Harris in Pennsylvania during the 2024 American presidential election campaign.

In 2021, Cole-Hamilton's register of interests showed he had declared an income of £10,000 a year from renting out a cabin garden shed behind his Edinburgh home on Airbnb. After Russia launched a full-scale invasion of Ukraine in 2022, he said he hoped to use the property as a refuge to those coming to the UK under the Homes for Ukraine scheme the following summer.

Although he has lived in Scotland since childhood, Cole-Hamilton has received online abuse because of his English origin, which he attributed to Scottish nationalists. He and his constituency staff received extra security from the police, including a personal attack alarm, in 2019 after receiving threats that the police described as serious enough to be considered a hate crime. In 2026, Cole-Hamilton said that he still carried an alarm, that the police were still liaising with him over the degree of "anti-English hate" he received, and spoke of being stalked by a person trying to find his home address. In May 2024, Cole-Hamilton announced he had been undergoing therapy for online abuse for the past two years. He said the Lib Dems were paying for the therapy, and that he made the announcement to “encourage others who were struggling to reach out and talk”. He has since befriended his psychotherapist, who is a combat veteran.

He previously owned a Tesla Model 3 from 2019 to 2025, selling it after the Elon Musk salute controversy. He now drives an electric Ford Mustang Mach-E. He enjoys listening to The Rolling Stones and reading science fiction. His leisure interests include surfing and running.

== Notes ==
Scottish Parliament
Preceded by Colin Keir	Member of the Scottish Parliament for Edinburgh Western; 2016–present	Incumbent
Party political offices
Preceded by Willie Rennie	Leader of the Scottish Liberal Democrats; 2021–present	Incumbent
