= YLM =

YLM or Ylm may stand for:

- Spherical harmonics, a branch of mathematics
- Young Liberal Movement of Australia, a political party
- Youth Link Movement, a Sri Lankan community project organization
- Turu language
- Yottalumen, a measure of light by lumen
