= 2019 Shetland by-election =

- 29 August 2019

Shetland constituency
- Turnout: 66.3% (▲4.2 pp)
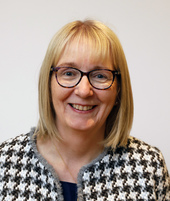

	First party	Second party	Third party
Candidate	Beatrice Wishart	Tom Wills	Ryan Thomson
Party	Liberal Democrats	SNP	Independent
Popular vote	5,659	3,822	1,286
Percentage	47.8%	32.3%	10.8%
Swing	▼19.6 pp	▲9.2 pp	New
MSP before election
Tavish Scott
Liberal Democrats
Elected MSP
Beatrice Wishart
Liberal Democrats

The 2019 Shetland by-election was held on 29 August 2019 to elect a Member of the Scottish Parliament (MSP) for the constituency of Shetland. It was held following the resignation of Liberal Democrat MSP Tavish Scott upon taking a new role at Scottish Rugby. The Liberal Democrats held the seat, with Beatrice Wishart being elected for the party.

== Candidates ==
The Liberal Democrats' Beatrice Wishart was deputy convener of the Shetland Islands Council. The Scottish National Party fielded Shetland-born Tom Wills, an engineer with an offshore renewables company. Two Shetland Islands Council members, Ian Scott and Ryan Thomson, ran as independent candidates. A former Shetland Islands Council member, Michael Stout, also ran as an independent candidate.

== Campaign ==
The campaign was hard-fought; the SNP spent £100,000 on the by-election - more money than the party spent during the entire EU referendum - and there was a swing of over 14% to their candidate.

== Result ==
2019 Shetland by-election
Party	Candidate	Votes	%	±%
Liberal Democrats	Beatrice Wishart	5,659	47.86	−19.52
SNP	Tom Wills	3,822	32.32	+9.27
Independent	Ryan Thomson	1,286	10.88	New
Conservative	Brydon Goodlad	425	3.59	−0.07
Green	Debra Nicolson	189	1.60	New
Labour	Johan Adamson	152	1.29	−4.61
Independent	Michael Stout	134	1.13	New
Independent	Ian Scott	66	0.56	New
UKIP	Stuart Martin	60	0.51	New
Independent	Peter Tait	31	0.26	New
Majority		1,837	15.54	−28.76
Turnout		11,824	66.39	+4.31
Liberal Democrats hold		Swing	−14.40	

== Previous result ==
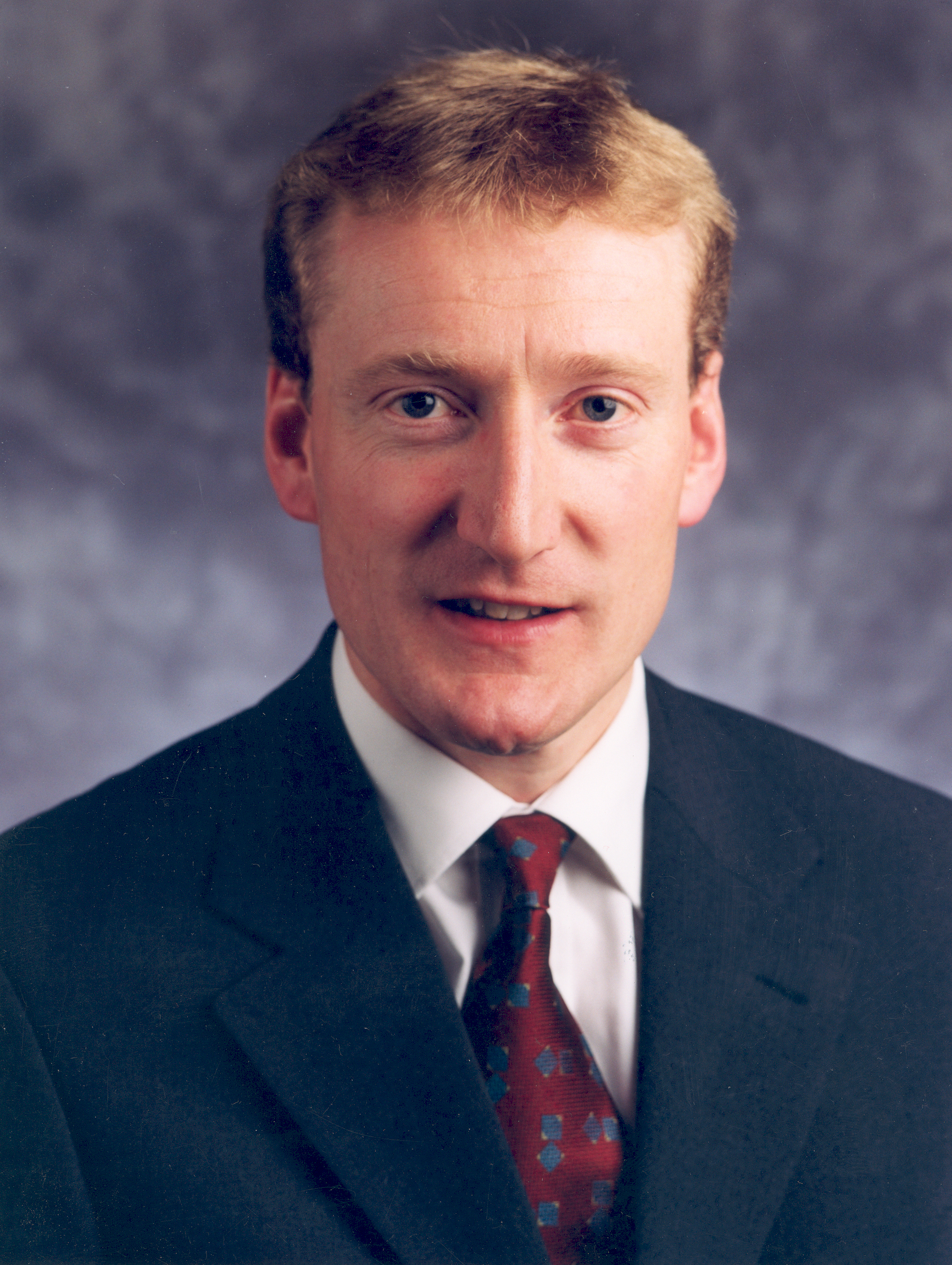
Tavish Scott

2016 Scottish Parliament election: Shetland
Party	Candidate	Votes	%	±%
Liberal Democrats	Tavish Scott	7,440	67.4	+19.9
SNP	Danus Skene	2,545	23.1	+11.0
Labour	Robina Barton	651	5.9	−0.7
Conservative	Cameron Smith	405	3.7	+0.2
Majority		4,895	44.3	+27.1
Turnout		11,041		
Liberal Democrats hold		Swing		
