= 2021 Scottish Liberal Democrats leadership election =

- 20 July – 20 August 2021
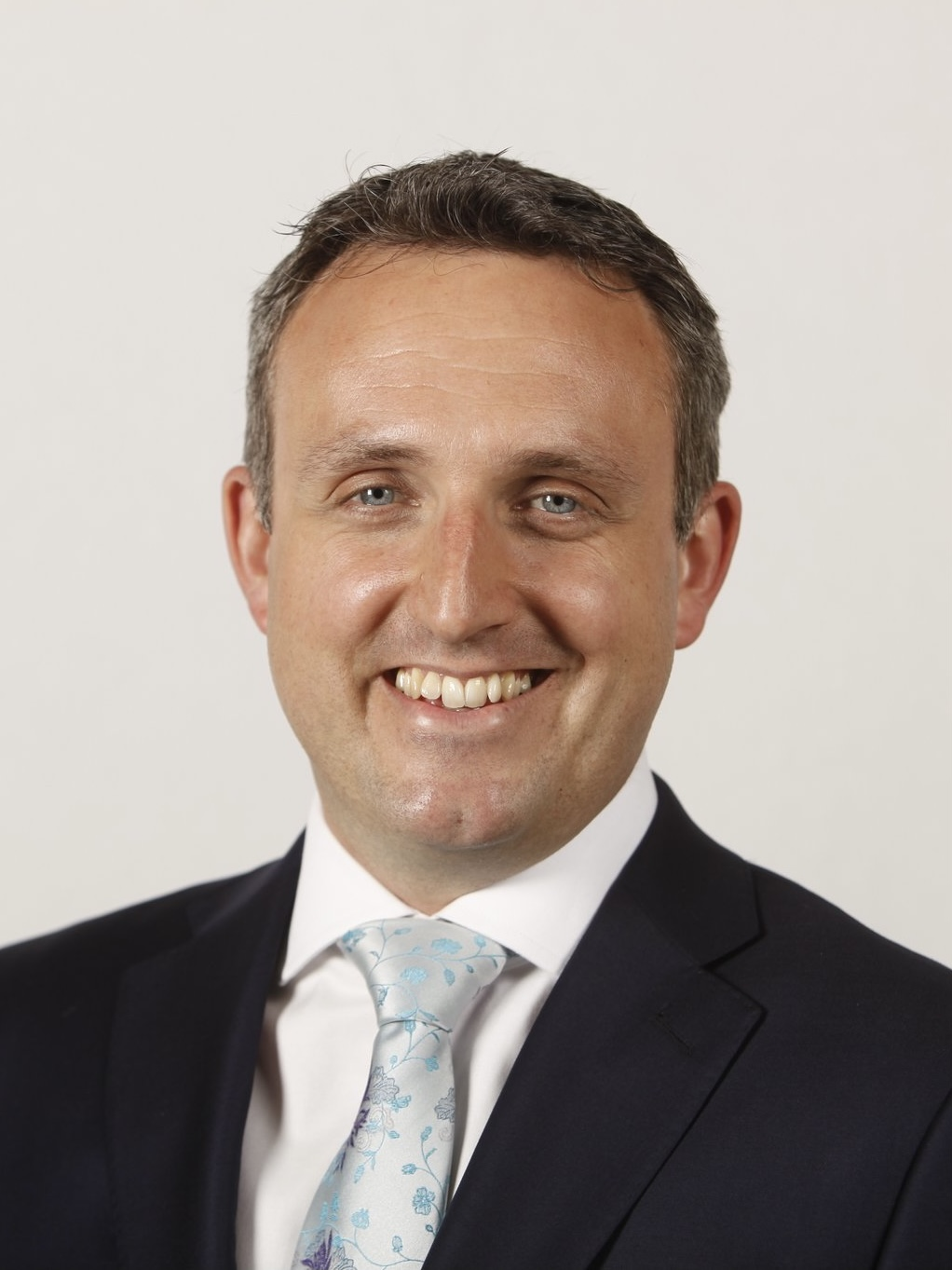
Candidate	Alex Cole-Hamilton
Popular vote	Unopposed
Leader before election
Alistair Carmichael (acting)
Willie Rennie
Elected Leader
Alex Cole-Hamilton

The 2021 Scottish Liberal Democrats leadership election was triggered on 12 July 2021 after incumbent leader Willie Rennie announced his intention to step down as leader of the Scottish Liberal Democrats following the 2021 Scottish Parliament election.

On 27 July, Edinburgh Western MSP Alex Cole-Hamilton announced his intention to run for leader. He stated that he wanted to offer an "alternative kind of thinking" to what he described as "the Scottish nationalism of the SNP and the British nationalism of Boris Johnson's Brexiteers".

Throughout the election, Deputy Leader Alistair Carmichael (MP for Orkney and Shetland) served as Interim Leader.

== Candidates ==
Only sitting MSPs may seek nominations to become leader, with Cole-Hamilton the only one to announce their candidacy. The party's executive stated its aim to conduct the election before Holyrood returns from its summer recess.

Nominations for the election opened on 20 July and closed on 20 August.

As only Cole-Hamilton announced his candidacy for the leadership, he was declared the leader of the party on 20 August.

== See also ==
- 2021 Scottish Labour leadership election
