= Tavish Scott =

British politician (born 1966)

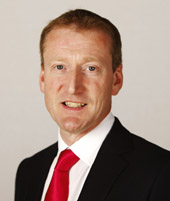
- Official portrait, 2011

Leader of the Scottish Liberal Democrats
- In office 26 August 2008 – 7 May 2011
- Deputy: Michael Moore; Jo Swinson
- Leader: Nick Clegg
- Preceded by: Nicol Stephen (Note: Michael Moore served as acting leader from 28 July to 26 August 2008 following the resignation of Nicol Stephen.)
- Succeeded by: Willie Rennie

Minister for Transport and Telecommunications
- In office 23 June 2005 – 17 May 2007
- First Minister: Jack McConnell
- Preceded by: Nicol Stephen
- Succeeded by: Stewart Stevenson

Member of the Scottish Parliament for Shetland
- In office 6 May 1999 – 15 July 2019
- Preceded by: Constituency Created
- Succeeded by: Beatrice Wishart

Personal details
- Born: 6 May 1966 (age 60) Inverness, Scotland
- Party: Scottish Liberal Democrats
- Education: Napier College, Edinburgh
- Website: Tavish Scott

Tavish Hamilton Scott (born 6 May 1966) is a former Scottish politician. He was the Member of the Scottish Parliament (MSP) for Shetland from 1999 to 2019, and Leader of the Scottish Liberal Democrats from 2008 to 2011. He stepped down as Leader following the 2011 Scottish Parliament election, in which the Liberal Democrats were reduced to five seats, down from 16 in the previous parliament.

== Background, education and early career ==
Scott was born on 6 May 1966 in Inverness, Scotland. He attended Anderson High School in Lerwick, Shetland, and holds a BA (Hons) in Business Studies from Napier College in Edinburgh. After graduating, he worked as a parliamentary assistant to Jim Wallace, then as Liberal Democrat MP for Orkney and Shetland, and later as a Press Officer for the Scottish Liberal Democrats. He then returned to Shetland and became a farmer and also a councillor on the Shetland Islands Council and Chairman of the Lerwick Harbour Trust.

== Member of the Scottish Parliament ==
Scott was elected as the first Member of the Scottish Parliament for Shetland in May 1999. He was the first politician to represent Shetland as its own constituency (Orkney and Shetland are one constituency in Westminster). He served as a Deputy Minister for Parliament in the Scottish Executive from 2000 to 2001 in succession to his colleague Iain Smith, but resigned after refusing to support the Executive in a vote on a tie-up scheme for fishing.

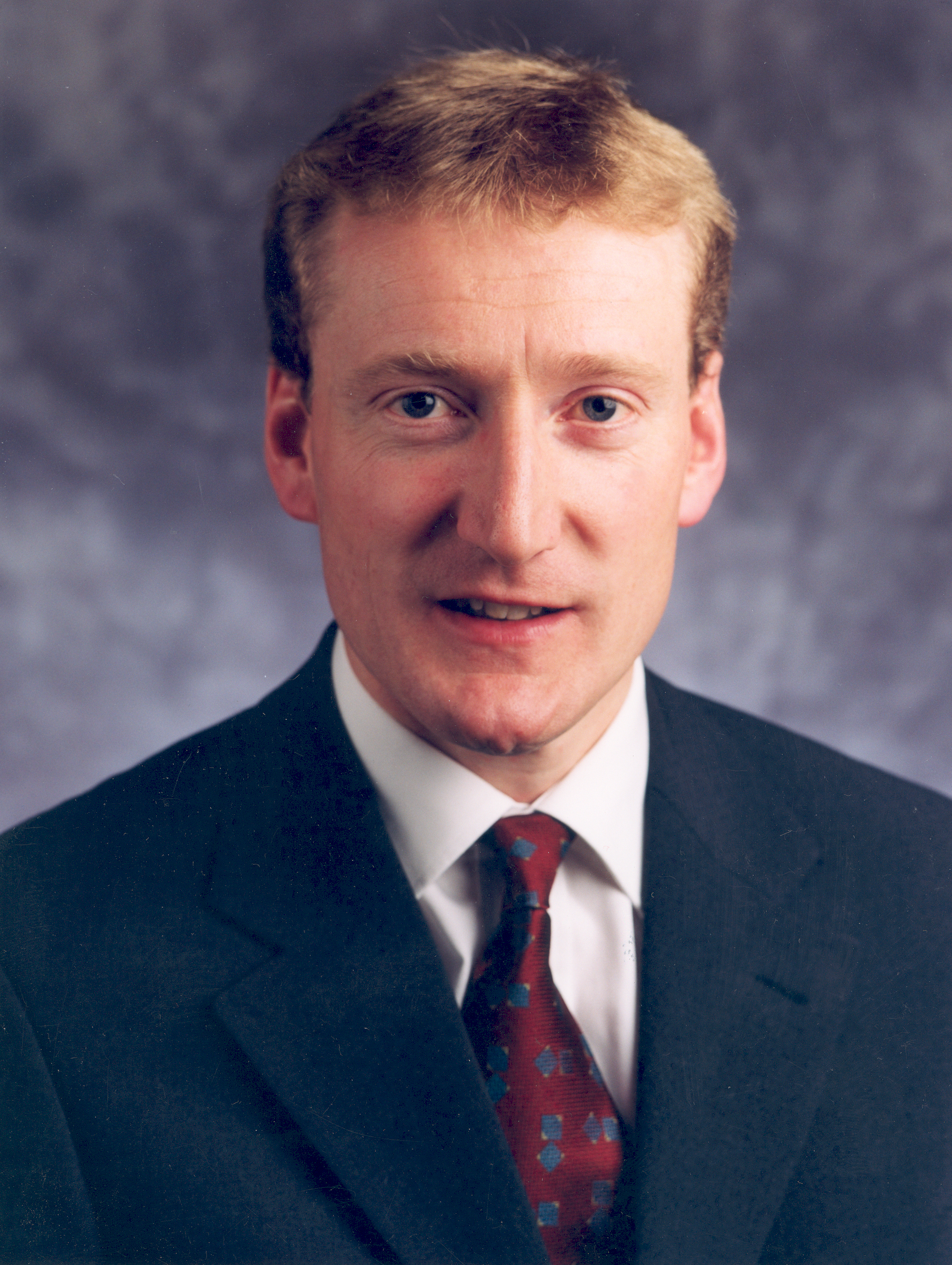
Tavish Scott as a government minister

In 2003, he returned to the Scottish Executive as Deputy Minister for Finance and Public Services. During his time there his department piloted the Local Governance (Scotland) Act, which changed the elections for local authorities in Scotland to a proportional representation system. Following Nicol Stephen's election as party leader and succession as Deputy First Minister of Scotland in 2005, Scott was appointed to the Cabinet as Minister for Transport. He was re-elected with an increased majority in May 2007, and held the largest margin by percentage, 50.1%, of any MSP over their closest challenger.

Following the resignation of his friend and former ministerial colleague Nicol Stephen, Scott declared his candidacy for the leadership of the Scottish Liberal Democrats on 7 July 2008 at Lerwick harbour, surrounded by a group of men dressed as Vikings. On 26 August 2008, he was announced the winner of the leadership contest with 59% (1,450) of the votes.

Following what he described as a "disastrous" set of results for the Scottish Liberal Democrats in the Scottish elections in May 2011, Scott offered his resignation as leader (remaining a Member of the Scottish Parliament). He claimed the poor showings were in part due to the coalition deal which saw the Liberal Democrats form a government with the Conservatives following the 2010 general election.

In the run-up to the 2014 Scottish Independence referendum, Scott was a keen advocate of a "No" vote and also called for recognition of "the Northern Isles' right to determine their own future." At the Liberal Democrat party conference in 2013, he put forward a motion with fellow MSP Liam McArthur to recognise the islands had a "separate right to self-determination". Scott said that his preferred outcome was for Shetland to become a crown dependency of the United Kingdom with its own parliament and was backed by the cross-party Wir Shetland movement, which campaigns for crown dependency status.

Scott announced in June 2019 that he would be resigning from the Scottish Parliament to take a position with the Scottish Rugby Union.

In September 2020, it was announced that Scott had been appointed Chief Executive of the Scottish Salmon Producers Organisation (SSPO), the trade body representing Scotland's farmed salmon sector. He formally assumed the role in November 2020.

In 2025, he was accused of breaking the rules around lobbying and is facing a formal investigation by the Ethical Standards Commissioner.

== Career timeline ==
- 1986–1989: Napier College
- 1989–1990: Parliamentary researcher to Jim Wallace MP for Orkney and Shetland, House of Commons
- 1990–1992: Press Officer, Scottish Liberal Democrats, Edinburgh
- 1992–1999: Farmer, Shetland family farm
- 1994–1999: Chairman and Trustee, Lerwick Harbour Trust
- 1994–1999: Councillor for Lerwick Harbour and Bressay ward on Shetland Islands Council
  - Vice-chairman of the Roads and Transport Committee
- 1997–1999: Director, Shetland Islands Tourism
- 1999–2019: Member of the Scottish Parliament for Shetland
- 2000–2001: Deputy Minister for Scottish Parliament
- 2003–2005: Deputy Minister for Finance, Public Services and Parliamentary Business
- 2005–2007: Minister for Transport
- 2007–2008: Shadow Cabinet Secretary for Finance and Sustainable Growth
  - Convenor of the Scottish Parliament's Economy, Energy and Tourism Committee
- 2008–2011: Leader of the Scottish Liberal Democrats
- 2011–2019: Scottish Liberal Democrat spokesman for business and the economy
- 2020–2026: Chief Executive of Scottish Salmon Producers Organisation, later renamed Salmon Scotland

== Notes ==
Scottish Parliament
New constituency	Member of the Scottish Parliament for Shetland; 1999–2019	Succeeded by Beatrice Wishart
Political offices
Preceded by Iain Smith	Deputy Minister for Parliamentary Business; 2000–2001	Succeeded by Euan Robson
Preceded by Peter Peacock	Deputy Minister for Finance and Public Service Reform; 2003–2005	Succeeded by George Lyon
Preceded by Nicol Stephen	Minister for Transport and Telecommunications; 2005–2007	Succeeded by Stewart Stevenson as Minister for Transport, Infrastructure and Climate Change
Party political offices
Preceded by Nicol Stephen	Leader of the Scottish Liberal Democrats; 2008–2011	Succeeded by Willie Rennie
