= 2008 Scottish Liberal Democrats leadership election =

- 26 August 2008
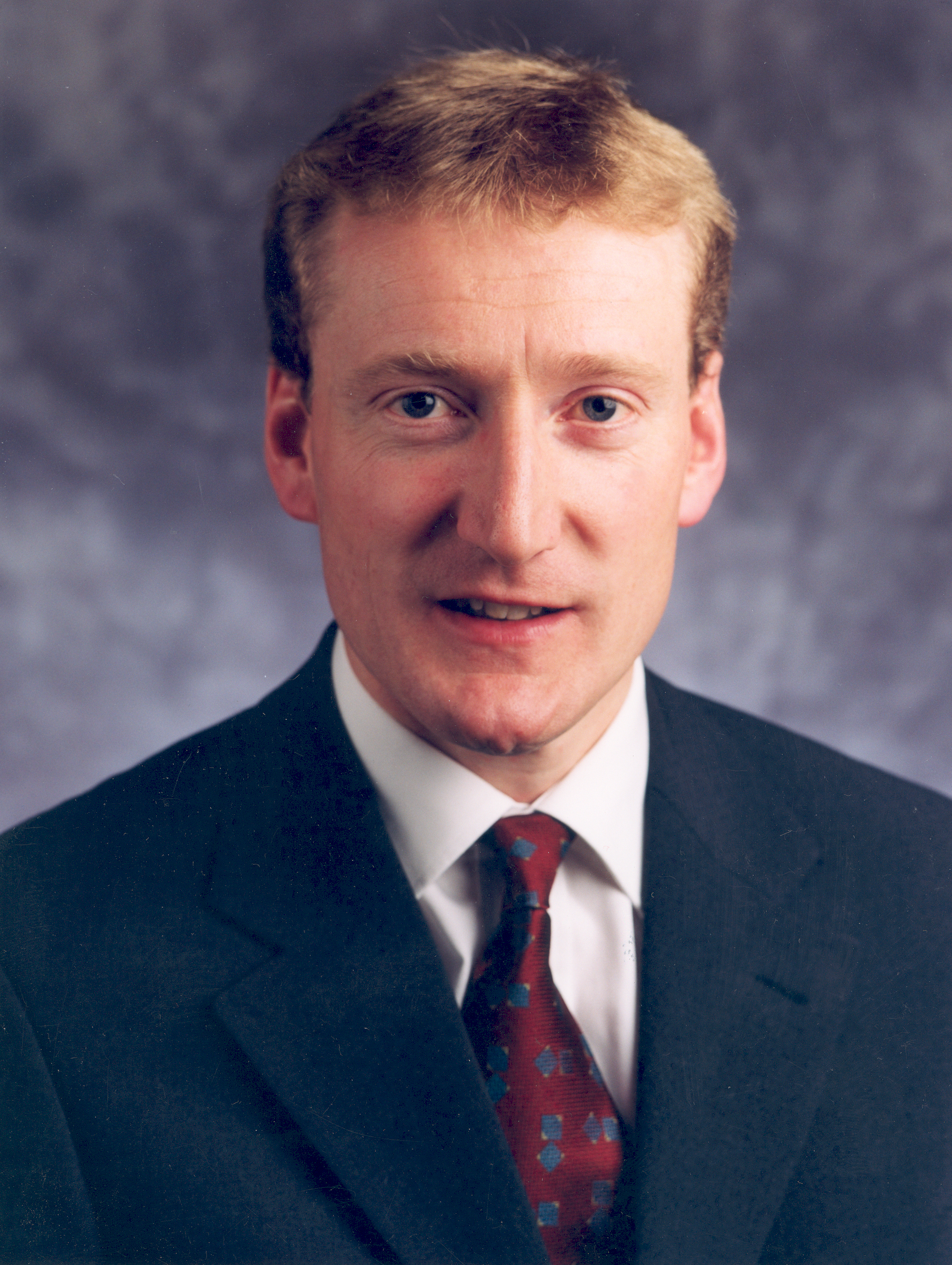

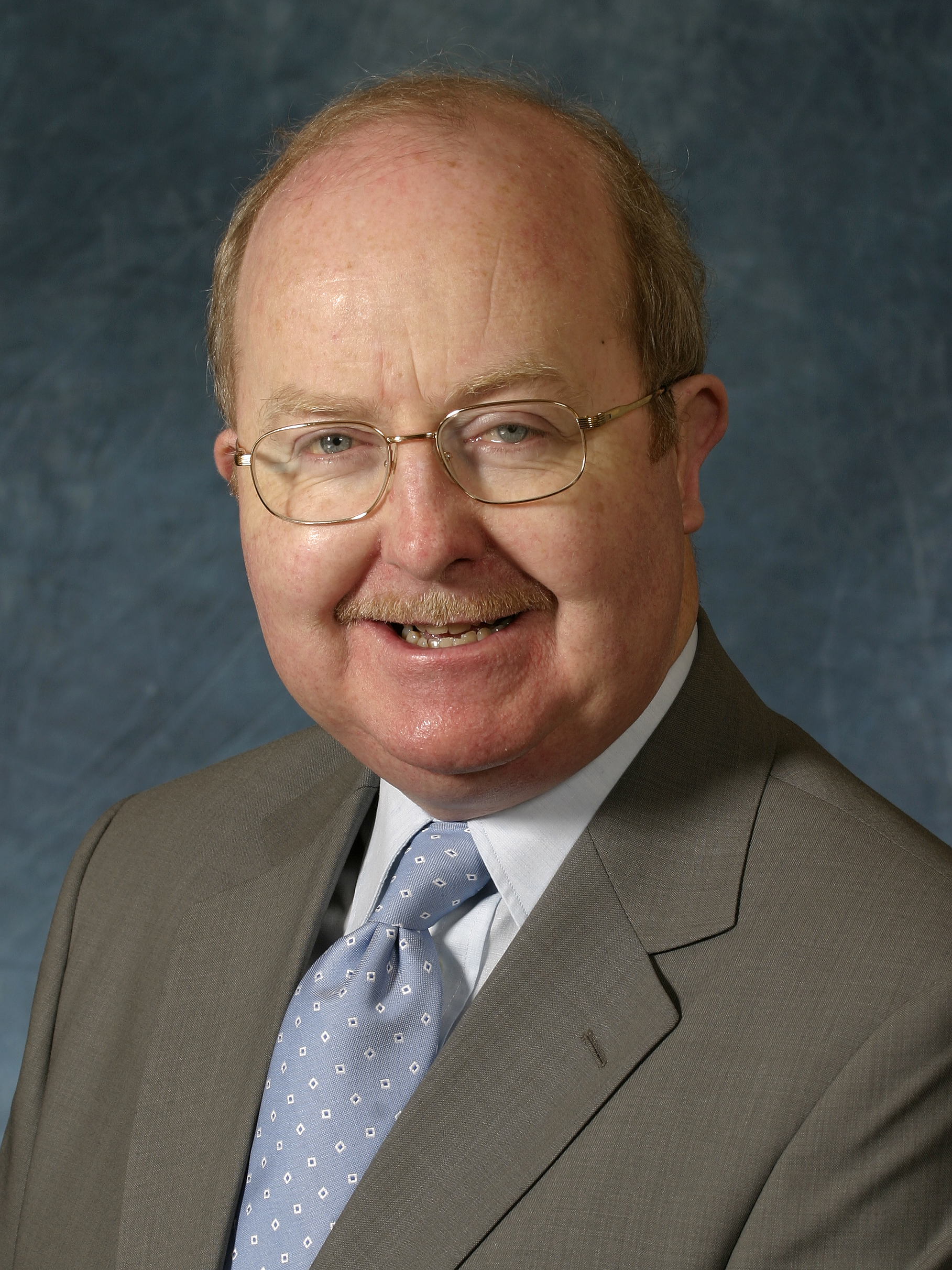

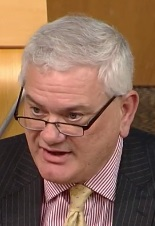
Candidate	Tavish Scott	Ross Finnie	Mike Rumbles
Popular vote	1,450	568	439
Percentage	59.0%	21.3%	17.9%
Leader before election
Michael Moore (acting)
Nicol Stephen
Elected Leader
Tavish Scott

The 2008 Scottish Liberal Democrats leadership election was an election to choose a new leader of the Liberal Democrats in Scotland, triggered following the resignation of Nicol Stephen for personal reasons. Deputy leader Michael Moore (MP for Berwickshire, Roxburgh and Selkirk) took over as interim party leader, and the timetable for the election was agreed on 5 July 2008: Nominations closed on 24 July 2008, the return of the ballot papers was set for 26 August 2008 and the declaration of results occurred on the same date. The last leadership election was held in 2005 after the resignation of Jim Wallace, when Stephen defeated Mike Rumbles.

== Candidates ==
=== Successfully nominated candidates ===
The following MSPs gained the required one nomination from a fellow MSP, and were therefore candidates for the leadership:

- Mike Rumbles - MSP for West Aberdeenshire and Kincardine
- Tavish Scott - MSP for Shetland and former transport minister
- Ross Finnie MSP for West of Scotland regional list and former environment minister

=== Suggested candidates ===
- Jeremy Purvis - MSP for Tweeddale, Ettrick and Lauderdale, had also been considered to be a possible contender, but he declined to run after Scott and Finnie announced their candidacies.

== Result ==
The result of the leadership election was announced on 26 August 2008; turnout was 61%.

First round
Candidate	Votes	
Candidate	Votes	%
Tavish Scott ✓	1,450	59.0%
Ross Finnie	568	21.3%
Mike Rumbles	439	17.9%
Turnout	2,457	61.0%
Tavish Scott elected leader Source: BBC News
