= 2011 Scottish Liberal Democrats leadership election =

- 17 May 2011
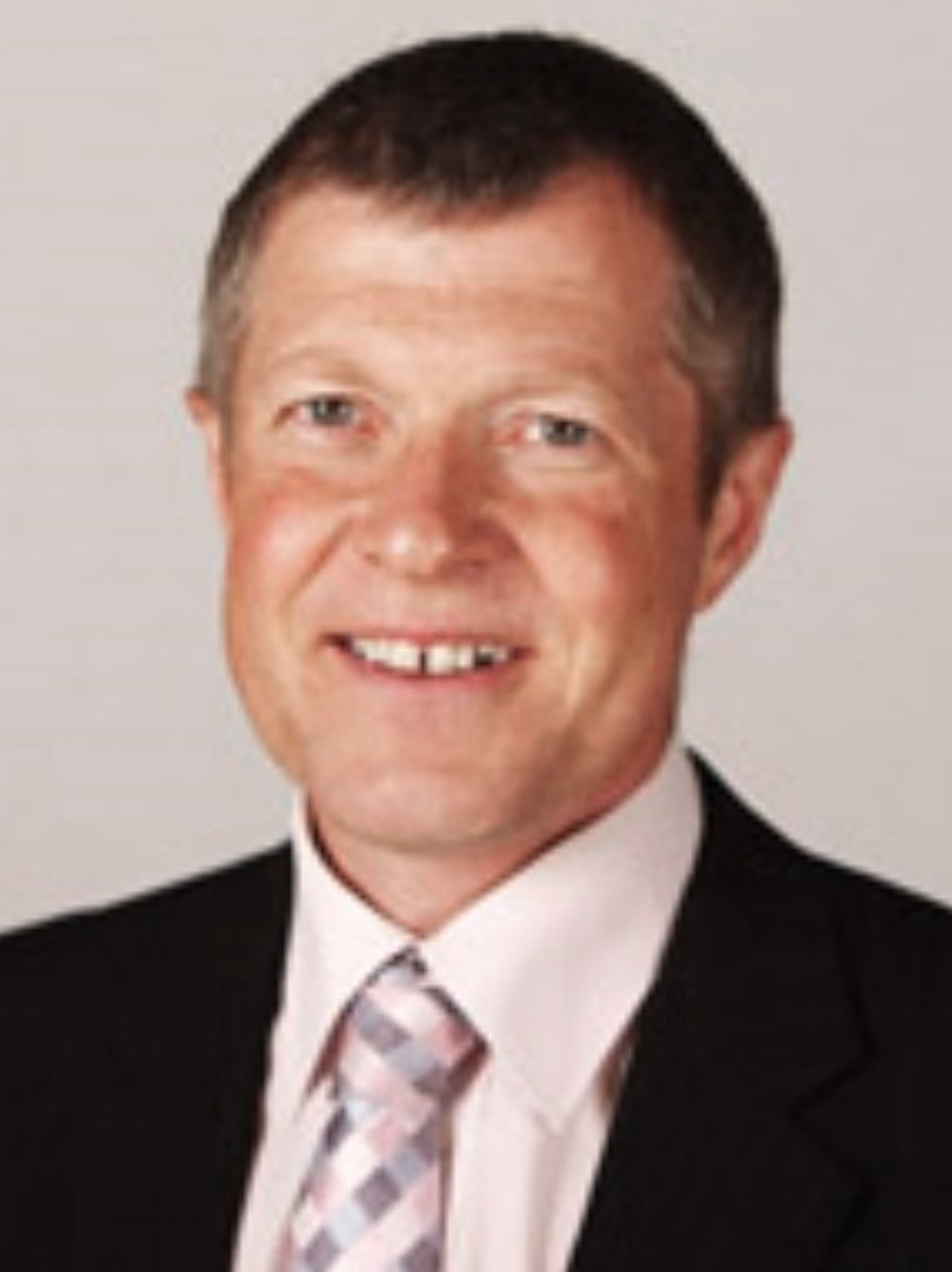
Candidate	Willie Rennie
Popular vote	Unopposed
Leader before election
Tavish Scott
Elected Leader
Willie Rennie

The 2011 Scottish Liberal Democrats leadership election was triggered by the resignation of party leader Tavish Scott on 7 May 2011, due to the very poor showing of the party at the 2011 Scottish Parliament election, in which the Liberal Democrats only returned 5 MSPs and lost 12.

Nominations for party leader closed on 17 May 2011, and with Willie Rennie the only declared candidate, he was elected to the position unopposed.

== Declared candidates ==
- Willie Rennie – MSP for the Mid Scotland & Fife Region, former MP for Dunfermline & West Fife (2006–10)

== Suggested candidates ==
There were only four other Scottish Liberal Democrat MSPs currently sitting in the Scottish Parliament: Jim Hume, Liam McArthur and Alison McInnes and Tavish Scott, the former party leader. Although Liam McArthur was mentioned as a possible contender, most media believed that it was unlikely that another candidate would stand due to the small size of the party making a leadership contest and ballot undesirable, as turned out to be the case.

== See also ==
- 2011 Scottish Conservatives leadership election
- 2011 Scottish Labour leadership election
