= Scottish Liberal Democrats =

Wing of the Liberal Democrats in Scotland

Scottish Liberal Democrats Pàrtaidh Libearalach Deamocratach na h-Alba
- Leader: Alex Cole-Hamilton
- Deputy Leader: Wendy Chamberlain
- President: Caron Lindsay
- Chief Executive: Paul Trollope
- Founded: 7 March 1988; 38 years ago
- Headquarters: 4 Clifton Terrace; Edinburgh; EH12 5DR
- Youth wing: Scottish Young Liberals
- Membership (December 2020): 4,185
- Ideology: Liberalism; Social liberalism; Federalism; British unionism; Pro-Europeanism
- Political position: Centre to centre-left
- National affiliation: Liberal Democrats
- European affiliation: Alliance of Liberals and Democrats for Europe
- International affiliation: Liberal International
- Colours: Orange
- Slogan: "For a fair deal for Scotland"
- House of Commons (Scottish seats): 6 / 57
- Scottish Parliament: 10 / 129
- Local government in Scotland: 88 / 1,226
- Councils led in Scotland: 1 / 32

Election symbol

Website
- www.scotlibdems.org.uk

The Scottish Liberal Democrats (Scottish Gaelic: Pàrtaidh Libearalach Deamocratach na h-Alba) is a liberal, federalist political party in Scotland, part of the UK Liberal Democrats. The party holds 10 of the 129 seats in the Scottish Parliament, 6 of the 57 Scottish seats in the House of Commons and 88 of 1,226 local councillors.

The Scottish Liberal Democrats is one of the three state parties within the federal Liberal Democrats, the others being the Welsh Liberal Democrats and the English Liberal Democrats. The Liberal Democrats do not contest elections in Northern Ireland.

== History ==
=== Formation and early years ===
The Scottish Liberal Democrats were formed by the merger of the Scottish Liberal Party and the Social Democratic Party (SDP) in Scotland, as part of the merger of the Liberal Party and SDP on 3 March 1988. The Scottish Liberal Democrats were formally established on 7 March 1988.

The party campaigned for the creation of a devolved Scottish Parliament as part of its wider policy of a federal United Kingdom. In the late 1980s and 1990s it and its representatives participated in the Scottish Constitutional Convention with Scottish Labour, the Scottish Greens, trades unions and churches. It also campaigned for a "Yes-Yes" vote in the 1997 devolution referendum.

=== 1999–2007: Coalition government with Labour ===
In the first elections to the Scottish Parliament in 1999, the Scottish Liberal Democrats won 17 seats. Following this, it formed a coalition government with Scottish Labour in the Scottish Executive. The then party leader, Jim Wallace, became deputy first minister of Scotland and cabinet secretary for justice and home affairs. He also served as acting first minister on three occasions, during the illness and then later, the death of the first First Minister Donald Dewar and the following resignation of his successor Henry McLeish. This partnership was renewed in 2003 and Wallace became Deputy First Minister and Minister for Enterprise and Lifelong Learning. On 23 June 2005, Nicol Stephen MSP succeeded Wallace as party leader and took over his positions in the Executive until the 2007 elections.

Prior to the partnership government being formed in 1999, the UK had only limited experience of coalition government. The Liberal Democrats’ participation attracted criticism for involving compromises to its preferred policies, although several of its manifesto pledges were adopted as government policy or legislation. These included changes to the arrangements for student contributions to higher education costs (although whether that amounted to the claimed achievement of having abolished tuition fees was hotly contested), free personal care for the elderly and (during the second coalition government) changing the system of elections for Scottish local authorities to the single transferable vote, a long-standing Liberal Democrat policy.

=== 2007–2011: Opposition ===
In the 2007 Scottish Parliament election, the party won one fewer seat than in the two previous Scottish elections. This was the first parliamentary election for 28 years in which the party's parliamentary strength in Scotland was reduced. This experience led to some criticism of the party's election strategy and its leader. Although it was arithmetically possible to form a majority coalition with the Scottish National Party (SNP) and the Scottish Greens, the party refused to participate in coalition negotiations because of a disagreement over the SNP's policy of a referendum on Scottish independence, and sat as an opposition party in the Parliament.

On 2 July 2008, Nicol Stephen resigned as party leader, citing the "stresses and strains" of the job. Former deputy leader Michael Moore MP served as acting leader of the party until Tavish Scott MSP was elected party leader on 26 August 2008, winning 59% of the votes cast in a contest with parliamentary colleagues Ross Finnie and Mike Rumbles.

=== 2011–2021: Electoral decline ===
At the 2011 Scottish Parliament election, the party lost all its mainland constituencies, retaining only the two constituencies of Orkney and of Shetland; it also secured three List MSPs. This was, at the time, by far the party's worst electoral performance since the re-establishment of a Scottish Parliament in 1999. The disastrous results were blamed on a backlash to the Lib Dems' coalition with the Conservative Party. Scott resigned as party leader on 7 May; Willie Rennie won the resulting election to replace Scott ten days later.

At the 2014 European Parliament election, the party lost its only MEP, leaving it with no representation in Europe for the first time since 1994. The party lost 10 of its 11 MPs at the 2015 general election with only Alistair Carmichael narrowly retaining his seat, holding Orkney and Shetland with a 3.6% majority.

At the 2016 Scottish Parliament election, the party again had five MSPs elected but was pushed into 5th place by the Scottish Greens. While it regained the two constituency seats of Edinburgh Western and North East Fife from the SNP, its vote share fell slightly overall.

At the 2017 general election, the party retained Orkney and Shetland with an increased majority, as well as regaining three seats lost to the SNP in 2015 – Caithness, Sutherland and Easter Ross, East Dunbartonshire and Edinburgh West. The Scottish Liberal Democrats lost out on the North East Fife constituency to Stephen Gethins of the SNP by just two votes in the most marginal result in the UK at the general election that year.

In the 2019 European Parliament election, the Liberal Democrats re-gained a Member of European Parliament: Sheila Ritchie represented the Scotland Region until the United Kingdom left the European Union in early 2020.

In the 2019 general election, UK Lib Dem leader Jo Swinson lost East Dunbartonshire to Amy Callaghan of the SNP by 150 votes, and was forced to stand down as leader; but the Liberal Democrats successfully regained North East Fife and retained four seats in Scotland. The Scottish Lib Dems replaced Scottish Labour as the third-largest party in Scotland in terms of seats at the 2019 general election, in a historic landslide defeat for Labour nationwide.

In the 2021 Scottish Parliament election electors returned only 4 Lib Dem MSPs: the party held on to their 4 constituency seats while losing their single regional seat in North East Scotland. The party's vote-share also declined further, reaching a new low in both constituency and list-vote share at a Scottish Parliamentary election, and 50 candidates lost deposits in the 73 constituencies contested. This resulted in the party dropping below the five-seat threshold required for recognition as a parliamentary party in the Scottish Parliament, and consequently losing certain parliamentary rights such as a guaranteed question at First Minister's Questions. Following the election, Rennie resigned as leader, and was replaced by Alex Cole-Hamilton in August 2021 after he stood to run unopposed.

=== 2022–present: Rebuilding ===
After winning 87 council seats in the 2022 Scottish local elections, an increase from 67 in 2017, party leader Alex Cole-Hamilton announced a target of 150 councillors by 2027.

At the 2024 general election, the party won the most number of seats since 2010. They held the successors to their four seats which had their boundaries redrawn and gained an additional two by taking Mid Dunbartonshire and Ross, Skye and Lochaber from the SNP. Due to the reduction of House of Common seats in the 2023 Boundary Review, many news organisations would report the results as two holds and four gains.

In the 2026 Scottish Parliament election, the party campaigned on improving healthcare and education. They held three of their four constiuency seats and gained a further four. Additionally they won three new regional seats via the Additional Member System. The 10 seats they won is the highest amount since 2007.

== Leadership ==
=== Leaders ===
No.	Image	Name	Constituency	Term start	Term end	Tenure	Elections	First Minister	
1		Malcolm Bruce	MP for Gordon	3 March 1988	18 April 1992	4 years, 46 days	1992 (UK)	Office did not exist	
2		Jim Wallace	MP for Orkney and Shetland (1983–2001); MSP for Orkney (1999–2007)	18 April 1992	23 June 2005	13 years, 66 days	1997 (UK); 1999 (Scot); 2001 (UK); 2003 (Scot); 2005 (UK)	Office did not exist	
2		Jim Wallace	MP for Orkney and Shetland (1983–2001); MSP for Orkney (1999–2007)	18 April 1992	23 June 2005	13 years, 66 days	1997 (UK); 1999 (Scot); 2001 (UK); 2003 (Scot); 2005 (UK)	Donald Dewar	1999–2000
2		Jim Wallace	MP for Orkney and Shetland (1983–2001); MSP for Orkney (1999–2007)	18 April 1992	23 June 2005	13 years, 66 days	1997 (UK); 1999 (Scot); 2001 (UK); 2003 (Scot); 2005 (UK)	Himself (acting)	2000
2		Jim Wallace	MP for Orkney and Shetland (1983–2001); MSP for Orkney (1999–2007)	18 April 1992	23 June 2005	13 years, 66 days	1997 (UK); 1999 (Scot); 2001 (UK); 2003 (Scot); 2005 (UK)	Henry McLeish	2000–2001
2		Jim Wallace	MP for Orkney and Shetland (1983–2001); MSP for Orkney (1999–2007)	18 April 1992	23 June 2005	13 years, 66 days	1997 (UK); 1999 (Scot); 2001 (UK); 2003 (Scot); 2005 (UK)	Himself (acting)	2001
2		Jim Wallace	MP for Orkney and Shetland (1983–2001); MSP for Orkney (1999–2007)	18 April 1992	23 June 2005	13 years, 66 days	1997 (UK); 1999 (Scot); 2001 (UK); 2003 (Scot); 2005 (UK)	Jack McConnell	2001–2007
3		Nicol Stephen	MSP for Aberdeen South	23 June 2005	2 July 2008	3 years, 9 days	2007 (Scot)	Jack McConnell	2001–2007
3		Nicol Stephen	MSP for Aberdeen South	23 June 2005	2 July 2008	3 years, 9 days	2007 (Scot)	Alex Salmond	2007–2014
Acting		Michael Moore	MP for Berwickshire, Roxburgh and Selkirk	2 July 2008	26 August 2008	55 days	N/A	Alex Salmond	2007–2014
4		Tavish Scott	MSP for Shetland	26 August 2008	7 May 2011	2 years, 254 days	2010 (UK); 2011 (Scot)	Alex Salmond	2007–2014
5		Willie Rennie	MSP for North East Fife	17 May 2011	20 July 2021	10 years, 64 days	2015 (UK); 2016 (Scot); 2017 (UK); 2019 (UK); 2021 (Scot)	Alex Salmond	2007–2014
5		Willie Rennie	MSP for North East Fife	17 May 2011	20 July 2021	10 years, 64 days	2015 (UK); 2016 (Scot); 2017 (UK); 2019 (UK); 2021 (Scot)	Nicola Sturgeon	2014–2023
Acting		Alistair Carmichael	MP for Orkney and Shetland	20 July 2021	20 August 2021	31 days	N/A	Nicola Sturgeon	2014–2023
6		Alex Cole-Hamilton	MSP for Edinburgh Western	20 August 2021	Incumbent	5 years, 73 days	2024 (UK); 2026 (Scot)	Nicola Sturgeon	2014–2023
6		Alex Cole-Hamilton	MSP for Edinburgh Western	20 August 2021	Incumbent	5 years, 73 days	2024 (UK); 2026 (Scot)	Humza Yousaf	2023–2024
6		Alex Cole-Hamilton	MSP for Edinburgh Western	20 August 2021	Incumbent	5 years, 73 days	2024 (UK); 2026 (Scot)	John Swinney	2024–present

=== Deputy Leaders ===
No.	Image	Name	Constituency	Term start	Term end	Tenure	Concurrent spokesperson or Government role	Leader
1		Michael Moore	MP for Berwickshire, Roxburgh and Selkirk	2 November 2002	20 September 2010	7 years, 353 days	Foreign and Commonwealth Affairs Spokesperson (2001–2005, 2006–2007); Defence Spokesperson (2005–2006); International Development Spokesperson (2007–2010); Northern Ireland and Scotland Spokesperson (2008); Secretary of State for Scotland (2010–2013)	Jim Wallace
1		Michael Moore	MP for Berwickshire, Roxburgh and Selkirk	2 November 2002	20 September 2010	7 years, 353 days	Foreign and Commonwealth Affairs Spokesperson (2001–2005, 2006–2007); Defence Spokesperson (2005–2006); International Development Spokesperson (2007–2010); Northern Ireland and Scotland Spokesperson (2008); Secretary of State for Scotland (2010–2013)	Nicol Stephen
1		Michael Moore	MP for Berwickshire, Roxburgh and Selkirk	2 November 2002	20 September 2010	7 years, 353 days	Foreign and Commonwealth Affairs Spokesperson (2001–2005, 2006–2007); Defence Spokesperson (2005–2006); International Development Spokesperson (2007–2010); Northern Ireland and Scotland Spokesperson (2008); Secretary of State for Scotland (2010–2013)	Himself (acting)
1		Michael Moore	MP for Berwickshire, Roxburgh and Selkirk	2 November 2002	20 September 2010	7 years, 353 days	Foreign and Commonwealth Affairs Spokesperson (2001–2005, 2006–2007); Defence Spokesperson (2005–2006); International Development Spokesperson (2007–2010); Northern Ireland and Scotland Spokesperson (2008); Secretary of State for Scotland (2010–2013)	Tavish Scott
2		Jo Swinson	MP for East Dunbartonshire	20 September 2010	23 September 2012	2 years, 3 days	Parliamentary Under-Secretary for Employment Relations, Consumer and Postal Affairs (2012–2015); Parliamentary Under-Secretary of State for Women and Equalities (2012–2015)	Tavish Scott
2		Jo Swinson	MP for East Dunbartonshire	20 September 2010	23 September 2012	2 years, 3 days	Parliamentary Under-Secretary for Employment Relations, Consumer and Postal Affairs (2012–2015); Parliamentary Under-Secretary of State for Women and Equalities (2012–2015)	Willie Rennie
3		Alistair Carmichael	MP for Orkney and Shetland	23 September 2012	3 December 2021	9 years, 71 days	Chief Whip of the Liberal Democrats (2010–2013, 2017–2020); Deputy Government Chief Whip/Comptroller of the Household (2010–2013); Secretary of State for Scotland (2013–2015); Home Affairs Spokesperson (2015–2016, 2020–2024); Northern Ireland Spokesperson (2017–2024); Environment, Food and Rural Affairs Spokesperson (2019); Foreign and Commonwealth Affairs and Exiting the European Union spokesperson (2020)	Willie Rennie
3		Alistair Carmichael	MP for Orkney and Shetland	23 September 2012	3 December 2021	9 years, 71 days	Chief Whip of the Liberal Democrats (2010–2013, 2017–2020); Deputy Government Chief Whip/Comptroller of the Household (2010–2013); Secretary of State for Scotland (2013–2015); Home Affairs Spokesperson (2015–2016, 2020–2024); Northern Ireland Spokesperson (2017–2024); Environment, Food and Rural Affairs Spokesperson (2019); Foreign and Commonwealth Affairs and Exiting the European Union spokesperson (2020)	Himself (acting)
3		Alistair Carmichael	MP for Orkney and Shetland	23 September 2012	3 December 2021	9 years, 71 days	Chief Whip of the Liberal Democrats (2010–2013, 2017–2020); Deputy Government Chief Whip/Comptroller of the Household (2010–2013); Secretary of State for Scotland (2013–2015); Home Affairs Spokesperson (2015–2016, 2020–2024); Northern Ireland Spokesperson (2017–2024); Environment, Food and Rural Affairs Spokesperson (2019); Foreign and Commonwealth Affairs and Exiting the European Union spokesperson (2020)	Alex Cole-Hamilton
4		Wendy Chamberlain	MP for North East Fife	3 December 2021	Incumbent	4 years, 333 days	Chief Whip of the Liberal Democrats (2020–present); Scotland and Wales Spokesperson (2020–2022); Work and Pensions Spokesperson (2020–2024)	Alex Cole-Hamilton

=== Current party leadership, office bearers and committee members ===
Current party officials include:

- Leader: Alex Cole-Hamilton MSP
- Deputy Leader: Wendy Chamberlain MP
- Convener: Jenni Lang
- Treasurer: Mike Gray
- President: Caron Lindsay
- Vice-Convener, Policy: Neil Casey
- Vice-Convener, Conference: Fraser Graham
- Vice-Convener, Campaigns & Candidates: Charles Dundas

== Structure ==
In keeping with its basis as a federation of organisations, the Scottish party also consists of a number of local parties (which mostly follow the boundaries of the Scottish Council Areas), which are each distinct accounting units under the Political Parties, Elections and Referendums Act 2000. Local parties are predominantly responsible for the party's political campaigning and for selecting candidates for parliamentary and local authority elections.

There are also eight regional parties (based on the boundaries of the eight Scottish Parliament electoral regions).

== Administration ==
The party's headquarters are located in Edinburgh. The conference is the highest decision-making body of the party on both policy and strategic issues. The day-to-day organisation of the party is the responsibility of the party's Executive Committee, which is chaired by the Convener of the party and includes the Leader, the Deputy Leader and the President of the party, as well as the party Treasurer and the three Vice-Conveners. All party members vote every two years in internal elections to elect people to all the below positions, except Leader & Depute Leader.

== Conferences ==
Like the Federal party, the Scottish party holds two conferences per year: a Spring Conference, and an Autumn Conference.

== Associated organisations ==
Associated organisations generally seek to influence the direction of the party on a specific issue or represent a section of the party membership. The party has five associated organisations:

- Association of Scottish Liberal Democrat Councillors and Campaigners (ASLDC)
- LGBT+ Liberal Democrats
- Scottish Green Liberal Democrats
- Scottish Women Liberal Democrats
- Scottish Young Liberals

=== Association of Scottish Liberal Democrat Councillors and Campaigners ===
The Association of Scottish Liberal Democrat Councillors (ASLDC) is a network of Liberal Democrat councillors and local campaigners across Scotland which works to support and develop Liberal Democrat involvement in Scottish Local Government. Following the Local Council Election of May 2017, under the Single Transferable Vote (STV) system, 67 Liberal Democrats were elected, a drop of 3 on Local Council Election of May 2012. A voluntary Executive Committee meets several times a year to run the organisation. ASLDC works alongside Liberal Democrats in the Convention of Scottish Local Authorities (CoSLA) where Peter Barrett is leader of the Liberal Democrat Group.

== Policy platform ==
The Scottish Party decides its policy on state matters independently from the federal party. State matters include not only currently devolved issues but also those reserved matters which the party considers should be devolved to the Scottish Parliament, including broadcasting, energy, drugs and abortion. The party also believes that the Scottish Parliament should exercise greater responsibility on fiscal matters. A party commission chaired by former Liberal Party leader and Scottish Parliament Presiding Officer Sir David Steel set out the party's proposals on the constitutional issue.

According to its constitution, the party believes in a "fair, free and open society ... in which no-one shall be enslaved by poverty, ignorance or conformity". It has traditionally argued for both positive and negative liberties, tolerance of social diversity, decentralisation of political authority, including proportional representation for public elections, internationalism and greater involvement in the European Union. In the 2007 elections it campaigned for reforms to public services and local taxation, and for more powers for the Scottish Parliament within a federal Britain.

In December 2007, the party (along with Scottish Labour and the Scottish Conservatives) supported the creation of a new Commission on Scottish Devolution, along similar lines to the earlier Scottish Constitutional Convention, to discuss further powers for the Scottish Parliament.

In 2012, the Scottish Liberal Democrats joined the Better Together campaign with other Unionist political parties to campaign for a No vote in the 2014 Scottish independence referendum, with Craig Harrow, then convener of the party, joining the Board of Directors.

They campaigned for the UK and Scotland to remain a member of the European Union via the Stronger In advocacy group preceding the 2016 United Kingdom European Union membership referendum

In 2021, the Scottish Liberal Democrats negotiated a budget agreement with the SNP Scottish government, helping pass the Scottish budget with the condition of additional funding for community mental health services, schools and renewables retraining for people in the oil and gas sector in North East Scotland.

In the Scottish Parliament election later that year, their manifesto pledges included training more mental health specialists, an NHS recovery plan after the COVID-19 pandemic, investing in low carbon heat networks, new national parks, a universal basic income, play-based education, opposing a second independence referendum and moving homes to zero-emission heating.

In the 2024 UK General Election, the party's manifesto was similar to the UK-wide party manifesto. The manifesto focussed on funding for the NHS and social care, stopping the dumping of sewage into Scottish rivers and tackling the cost-of-living crisis. The manifesto also included pledges on zero-emissions by 2045 at the latest, a one- year emergency home insulation programme, removing the benefit cap, electrifying the rail network, enhancing the Human Rights Act, and scrapping the Illegal Migration Act, among other policies.

== Elected representatives ==
=== Scottish Parliament ===
Member of the Scottish Parliament	Constituency or Region	First elected	Spokespersons
Alex Cole-Hamilton	Edinburgh Western	2016	Leader of the Scottish Liberal Democrats; Equalities
Liam McArthur	Orkney	2007	Economy, Finance & Tourism
Willie Rennie	North East Fife	2011	Chief Whip & Transport
David Green	Caithness,Sutherland and Ross	2026	Public Service Reform, Europe, External Affairs & Culture Spokesperson
Morven-May MacCallum	Highlands and Islands	2026	Housing, Social Security & Local Government
Andrew Baxter	Skye, Lochaber and Badenoch	2026	Rural Affairs
Duncan Dunlop	South Scotland	2026	Education, Children & Young People
Yi-pei Chou Turvey	North East Scotland	2026	Justice
Sanne Dijkstra-Downie	Edinburgh Northern	2026	Climate, Environment & Energy
Adam Harley	Strathkelvin and Bearsden	2026	Health & Care

=== House of Commons of the United Kingdom ===
Member of Parliament	Constituency	First elected	Notes
Alistair Carmichael	Orkney and Shetland	2001	Chair of the Environment, Food and Rural Affairs Select Committee
Wendy Chamberlain	North East Fife	2019	Deputy Leader of the Scottish Liberal Democrats and UK Liberal Democrat Chief Whip
Christine Jardine	Edinburgh West	2017	
Angus MacDonald	Inverness, Skye and West Ross-shire	2024	
Susan Murray	Mid Dunbartonshire	2024	UK Liberal Democrat Spokesperson for Scotland
Jamie Stone	Caithness, Sutherland and Easter Ross	2017	Chair of the Petitions Committee

=== Local Government ===
Scottish Liberal Democrats currently have 88 elected councillors across Scotland with representation in each of the following councils:

- Aberdeen City Council (4 councillors)
- Aberdeenshire Council (14)
- Argyll and Bute Council (4)
- Comhairle nan Eilean Siar (1)
- Dumfries and Galloway Council (1)
- Dundee City Council (4)
- East Dunbartonshire Council (4)
- City of Edinburgh Council (14)
- Fife Council (13)
- The Highland Council (16)
- Perth and Kinross Council (5)
- Renfrewshire Council (1)
- Scottish Borders Council (3)
- South Lanarkshire Council (3)
- West Lothian Council (1)

== Election results ==
=== Scottish Parliament ===
Orange indicates the seats won by the Liberal Democrats at the 2026 Scottish Parliament election.

Election	Leader	Constituency			Regional			Total seats	+/–	Pos.	Government
Election	Leader	Votes	%	Seats	Votes	%	Seats	Total seats	+/–	Pos.	Government
1999	Jim Wallace	333,179	14.2	12 / 73	290,760	12.4	5 / 56	17 / 129		4th	Lab–LD
2003	Jim Wallace	294,347	15.4	13 / 73	225,774	11.8	4 / 56	17 / 129	0	4th	Lab–LD
2007	Nicol Stephen	326,232	16.2	11 / 73	230,651	11.3	5 / 56	16 / 129	▼1	4th	Opposition
2011	Tavish Scott	157,714	7.9	2 / 73	104,472	5.2	3 / 56	5 / 129	▼11	4th	Opposition
2016	Willie Rennie	178,238	7.8	4 / 73	119,284	5.2	1 / 56	5 / 129	0	▼5th	Opposition
2021	Willie Rennie	187,816	6.9	4 / 73	137,152	5.1	0 / 56	4 / 129	▼1	5th	Opposition
2026	Alex Cole-Hamilton	261,408	11.4	7 / 73	216,224	9.4	3 / 56	10 / 129	▲6	▼6th	Opposition

=== House of Commons ===
Gold indicates the seats won by the Liberal Democrats at the 2024 United Kingdom general election in Scotland.

This table shows the electoral results of the Scottish Liberal Democrats, from the first election the party contested in 1992. Total number of seats, number of votes and vote percentage, is for Scotland only. For results prior to 1992, see Scottish Liberal Party.

Election	Leader		Scotland					Government
Election	(Scotland)	(United Kingdom)	Votes	%	Seats	+/–	Pos.	Government
1992	Malcolm Bruce	Paddy Ashdown	383,856	13.1	9 / 72	Steady	3rd	Opposition
1997	Jim Wallace	Paddy Ashdown	365,362	13.0	10 / 72	▲1	▲2nd	Opposition
2001	Jim Wallace	Charles Kennedy	380,034	16.3	10 / 72	Steady	2nd	Opposition
2005	Jim Wallace	Charles Kennedy	528,076	22.6	11 / 59	▲1	2nd	Opposition
2010	Tavish Scott	Nick Clegg	465,471	18.9	11 / 59	Steady	2nd	Cons–LD
2015	Willie Rennie	Nick Clegg	219,675	7.5	1 / 59	▼10	▼4th	Opposition
2017	Willie Rennie	Tim Farron	179,061	6.8	4 / 59	▲3	4th	Opposition
2019	Willie Rennie	Jo Swinson	263,417	9.5	4 / 59	Steady	▲3rd	Opposition
2024	Alex Cole-Hamilton	Ed Davey	234,228	9.7	6 / 57	▲2	3rd	Opposition

=== Local elections ===
The Local Government (Scotland) Act 1973 established a two-tier system of regions and districts. The Scottish Liberal Democrats contested the district elections in 1988 and 1992, followed by the regional elections in 1990 and 1994.

District councils					Regional and island councils				
Election	Votes		Seats	Councils	Election	Votes		Seats	Councils
Election	%	Pos.	Seats	Councils	Election	%	Pos.	Seats	Councils
1988	8.4	4th	84 / 1,158	2 / 53	1990	8.0	4th	40 / 453	0 / 12
1992	9.5	4th	94 / 1,158	2 / 53	1994	12.2	4th	60 / 453	0 / 12

2022 Scottish local elections results where gold represents the Liberal Democrats.

The two-tier system of local government lasted until 1 April 1996 when the Local Government etc. (Scotland) Act 1994 came into effect, abolishing the regions and districts and replacing them with 32 unitary authorities. Elections for the new mainland unitary authorities were first contested in 1995. The Local Governance (Scotland) Act 2004 switched the electoral system for Scottish local elections from first past the post (FPTP) to single transferable vote (STV), beginning in 2007.

Election	Leader	1st Pref Votes		Councillors		Councils		Pos.
Election	Leader	Votes	%	Seats	+/-	Majorities	+/-	Pos.
1995 (Note: The three island regional councils (Orkney, Shetland and the Western Isles) were retained from the previous two-tier system of local government. These councils did not take part in the 1995 election, having held local elections in 1994.)	Jim Wallace	166,141	9.8	121 / 1,155	N/A	0 / 29	N/A	▲3rd
1999	Jim Wallace	289,236	12.7	156 / 1,222	▲35	0 / 32	Steady	3rd
2003	Jim Wallace	272,057	14.5	175 / 1,222	▲19	1 / 32	▲1	3rd
2007	Nicol Stephen	266,693	12.7	166 / 1,222	▼9	0 / 32	▼1	3rd
2012	Willie Rennie	103,087	6.6	71 / 1,223	▼95	0 / 32	Steady	▼4th
2017	Willie Rennie	128,821	6.8	67 / 1,227	▼4	0 / 32	Steady	4th
2022	Alex Cole-Hamilton	159,815	8.6	87 / 1,226	▲20	0 / 32	Steady	4th

=== European Parliament ===
Gold indicates the council areas where the Liberal Democrats won a plurality of the votes at the 2019 European Parliament election in Scotland.

During the United Kingdom's membership of the European Union (1973–2020), Scotland participated in European Parliament elections, held every five years from 1979 until 2019. The Scottish Liberal Democrats contested the 1989 and 1994 elections under the first past the post (FPTP) electoral system. The European Parliamentary Elections Act 1999 introduced a closed-list party list system method of proportional representation and a single Scotland-wide electoral region, which came into effect in 1999.

Election	Leader		Scotland				
Election	(Scotland)	(United Kingdom)	Votes	%	Seats	+/–	Pos.
1989	Malcolm Bruce	Paddy Ashdown	68,056	4.3	0 / 8	Steady	▼5th
1994	Jim Wallace	Paddy Ashdown	107,811	7.2	0 / 8	Steady	▲4th
1999	Jim Wallace	Paddy Ashdown	96,971	9.8	1 / 8	▲1	4th
2004	Jim Wallace	Charles Kennedy	154,178	13.1	1 / 7	Steady	4th
2009	Tavish Scott	Nick Clegg	127,038	11.5	1 / 6	Steady	4th
2014	Willie Rennie	Nick Clegg	95,319	7.1	0 / 6	▼1	▼6th
2019	Willie Rennie	Vince Cable	218,285	13.8	1 / 6	▲1	▲3rd

== Appointments ==
=== House of Lords ===
Peer	Ennobled	Notes
Elizabeth Barker, Baroness Barker	1999	
Malcolm Bruce, Baron Bruce of Bennachie	2015	Scotland Spokesperson of the Liberal Democrats in the House of Lords. MP for Gordon (1983–2015). Leader of the Scottish Liberal Democrats (1988–1992). Deputy Leader of the Liberal Democrats (2014–2015)
Jeremy Purvis	2013	Leader of the Liberal Democrats in the House of Lords. MSP for Tweeddale, Ettrick and Lauderdale (2003–2011)
Nicol Stephen	2011	MP for Kincardine and Deeside (1991–1992). MSP for Aberdeen South (1999–2011). Leader of the Scottish Liberal Democrats (2005–2008). Deputy First Minister of Scotland (2005–2007)
Alison Suttie, Baroness Suttie	2013	Northern Ireland Spokesperson of the Liberal Democrats in the House of Lords. Deputy chief of staff to Deputy Prime Minister Nick Clegg (2010–2011)

== See also ==
- Scottish Liberals for Independence
- English Liberal Democrats
- Welsh Liberal Democrats
- Northern Ireland Liberal Democrats
