= Moray Firth School =

Location
- Petty East; Gollanfield; IV2 7QP; Scotland; 57°33′18″N 4°00′59″W

Information
- Type: Independent
- Motto: Finding a Way
- Established: September 2002
- Founder: Anni Cole-Hamilton
- Closed: September 2010
- Local authority: Highland
- Principal: Anni Cole-Hamilton
- Gender: Co-educational
- Age: 5 to 18

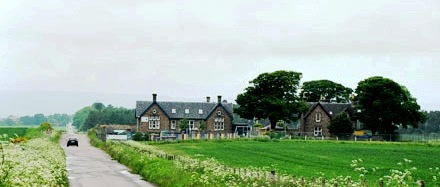
Moray Firth School

Moray Firth School was an independent school located at Gollanfield, between Inverness and Nairn, Scotland. It was open 2002–2010 and during that period was the only independent school in the Highland council area.

== Establishment ==
Plans for the new school were published in January 1998. The building was previously occupied by the Petty East School that was closed by Highland Council due to falling rolls.

Moray Firth School was opened, in September 2002, by Anni Cole-Hamilton, who was also its principal. When it opened it offered classes from primary one to secondary one, with the capacity to take 80 pupils.

== The school ==
The school had taught children aged 5 to 18 years. It featured that each pupil had their own individual learning plan.

At the time of closure it had pupils aged 5 to 14 with plans to add a sixth form, and was the only independent school in the Highlands.

== Events ==
The school, which had charitable status, was embroiled in a controversy in February 2008 when its website advertised a course on how to repair guns and maintain weapons. The advert was part of a package from Google.

Richard Dawkins visited the school in April 2009 and was quizzed on his views on evolution.

The Inverness-based Truly Terrible Orchestra was originally located at the school.

== Proposed relocation and closure ==
The Principal announced in February 2009 that she was seeking a greenfield site in Inverness to allow the school to continue with its expansion plan and to make the school more accessible to children.

The school closed in September 2010 in preparation for a move to the Inverness Campus. These plans were abandoned in February 2011 and at the time the school website stated that the school "remains in abeyance".
