= Willie Rennie =

Former Leader of the Scottish Liberal Democrats

Willie Rennie MSP
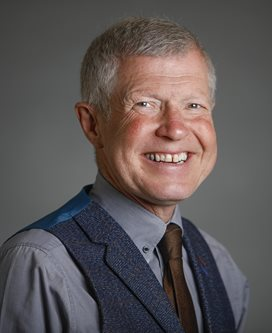
- Official portrait, 2026

Leader of the Scottish Liberal Democrats
- In office 17 May 2011 – 20 July 2021
- Deputy: Jo Swinson; Alistair Carmichael
- Leader: Nick Clegg; Tim Farron; Vince Cable; Jo Swinson; Sal Brinton (interim); Mark Pack (interim); Ed Davey
- Preceded by: Tavish Scott
- Succeeded by: Alex Cole-Hamilton (Note: Alistair Carmichael acted from 20 July to 20 August 2021.)

Liberal Democrat Spokesperson for Scotland
- In office 21 August 2019 – 6 January 2020 Serving with Jamie Stone
- Leader: Jo Swinson; Sir Ed Davey & Brinton/Pack
- Preceded by: Christine Jardine
- Succeeded by: Wendy Chamberlain

Member of the Scottish Parliament for Fife North East
- Incumbent
- Assumed office 5 May 2016
- Preceded by: Roderick Campbell
- Majority: 13,474 (40.2%)

Convener of the Transport Committee
- Incumbent
- Assumed office 10 June 2026

Member of the Scottish Parliament for Mid Scotland and Fife
- In office 5 May 2011 – 24 March 2016
- Preceded by: Ted Brocklebank
- Succeeded by: Alexander Stewart

Member of Parliament for Dunfermline and West Fife
- In office 9 February 2006 – 12 April 2010
- Preceded by: Rachel Squire
- Succeeded by: Thomas Docherty

Scottish Liberal Democrat portfolios
- 2026–present: Chief Whip and Spokesperson for Transport
- 2021–2026: Spokesperson for Education, Economy and Communities
- 2021: Spokesperson for Constitution, Europe and External Relations
- 2016–2021: Spokesperson for Finance, Infrastructure and the Economy

Personal details
- Born: William Cowan Rennie; 27 September 1967 (age 59) Fife, Scotland
- Party: Scottish Liberal Democrats
- Spouse: Janet Rennie (1992–present)
- Children: 2 sons
- Education: Paisley College of Technology; City of Glasgow College

William Cowan Rennie (born 27 September 1967) is a Scottish politician who served as the Leader of the Scottish Liberal Democrats from 2011 to 2021. He has served as the Member of the Scottish Parliament (MSP) for North East Fife since 2016, and previously as a list MSP for Mid Scotland and Fife (from 2011 to 2016) and as Member of Parliament (MP) for Dunfermline and West Fife (from 2006 to 2010). Rennie is the current convener of the Transport Committee.

After college, Rennie was a Liberal Democrat election campaigner and official before working as a public relations consultant in the private sector. He became the MP for Dunfermline and West Fife following a by-election win in February 2006. He later lost this seat to the Labour Party at the 2010 general election. He briefly served as a Special Government Adviser for the Liberal Democrat Scottish Secretaries of State Danny Alexander and Michael Moore at the Scotland Office.

He was then elected to the Scottish Parliament in the May 2011 election. He was elected as an additional member for the Mid Scotland and Fife region. He was soon after elected unopposed as leader of the Scottish Liberal Democrats, replacing Tavish Scott. At the 2016 Scottish Parliament election, Rennie was elected MSP for the constituency seat of North East Fife. Rennie was re-elected in the 2021 Scottish Parliament election, but resigned as Lib Dem leader two months later and was replaced by Alex Cole-Hamilton.

== Early life and education ==
Rennie was born on 27 September 1967, in Fife, to Peta and Alexander Rennie. He grew up in Strathmiglo where his family ran the village shop. Rennie went to Bell Baxter High School in Cupar, Fife, before going to Paisley College of Technology, where he graduated with a BSc in biology. After that, he received a Diploma in Industrial Administration at City of Glasgow College.

Rennie lives in Kelty with his wife Janet. Rennie was one of the 50 MPs who ran a mile to raise money for Sport Relief finishing close behind the winner, David Davies.

== Political career ==
=== Early political career: 1990–2001 ===
While a student at Paisley College of Technology he was deputy president of the student union. Rennie ran the Scottish Young Liberal Democrats (later reformed as Liberal Youth Scotland) and after graduation went on to work for the English Liberal Democrats in Cornwall. He then went on to work for the Liberal Democrats' campaigns department, and was the successful agent in the 1993 Christchurch by-election in Dorset.

After managing the party's campaigns in the South West England region in the 1997 General Election, he moved back to Scotland where he was Chief Executive of the Scottish Liberal Democrats from 1997 to 1999, and then the party's Chief of Staff in the new Scottish Parliament from 1999–2001.

=== McEwan Purvis: 2001–2006 ===
From 2001 to 2006 he worked for the small Scottish communications firm McEwan Purvis as an account director helping advise businesses and charities such as the Royal Society of Chemistry and Asthma UK. During his time at McEwan Purvis, Rennie was a press adviser to Fife Council's Liberal Democrat Opposition Group and a member of the Dunfermline Focus editorial team, working with Dunfermline's Lib Dem councillors on local issues.

=== Member of Parliament: 2006–2010 ===
After Labour MP Rachel Squire died, Rennie stood in the Dunfermline and West Fife by-election on 9 February 2006 and overturned a Labour majority of 11,800 to win the seat with a swing to his party of 16.24%. In the House of Commons, he was a member of the Liberal Democrat defence spokesperson team, chair of their parliamentary campaigns unit, and a member of the Commons Defence Select Committee.

During his time as an MP, he campaigned on local constituency issues such as abolishing the bridge tolls, banning sex offenders from being driving instructors in 2008, improvements to cancer services at Queen Margaret Hospital, and local jobs (including at Longannet Power Station and Rosyth Dockyard).

In the General Election of 6 May 2010, Rennie lost his seat to the Labour candidate Thomas Docherty.

=== Special Adviser and consultant: 2010–2011 ===
He was then for a time Special Adviser to the new Liberal Democrat Scottish Secretary Michael Moore MP.

=== Elected MSP and Leader of the Scottish Liberal Democrats: since 2011 ===
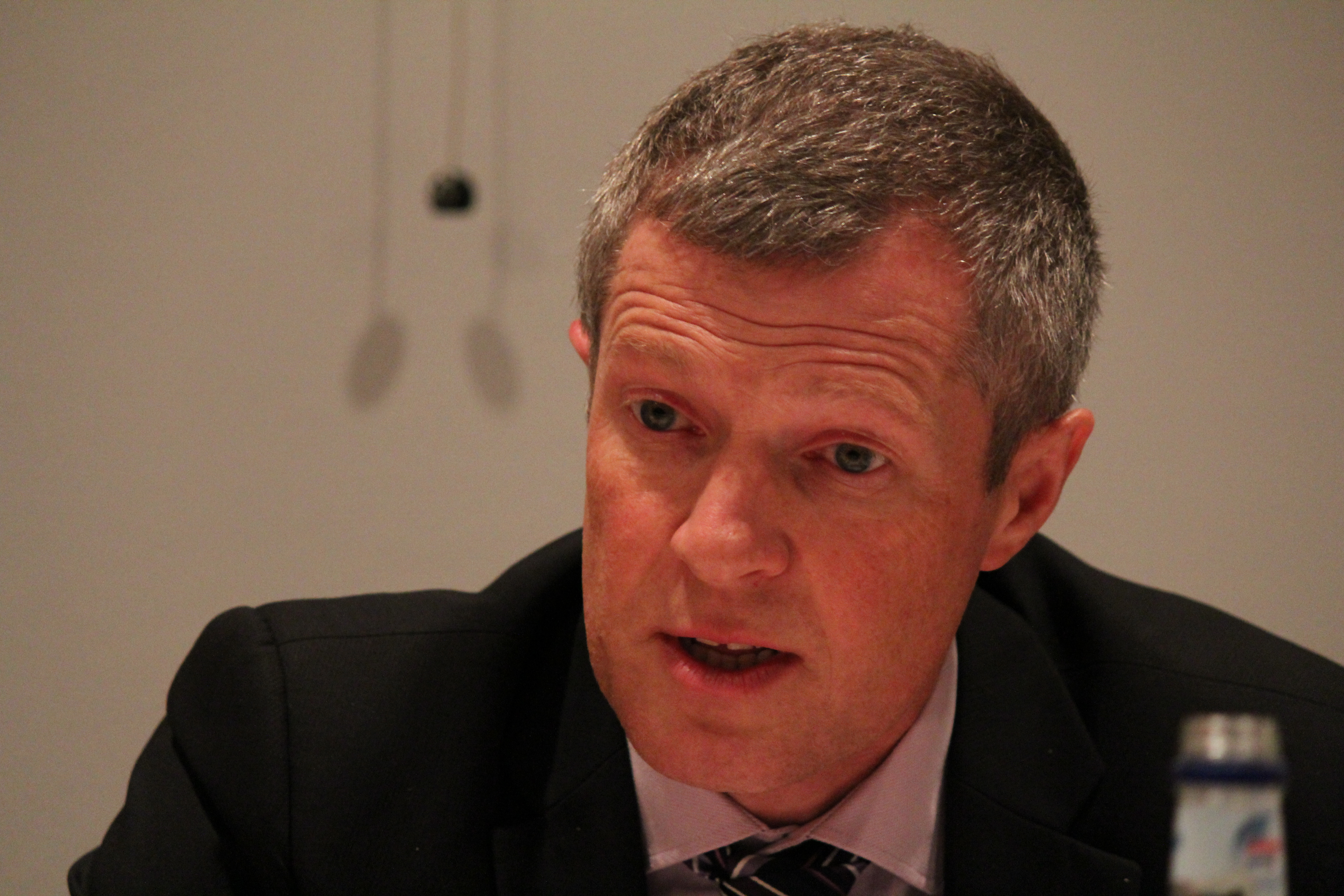
Rennie speaking in 2013

Rennie returned to front-line politics as an MSP when he won a regional list seat for the Liberal Democrats in the Scottish Parliament's Mid Scotland and Fife region at the Holyrood elections on 5 May 2011. He was the only new Liberal Democrat MSP to win a seat in this election.

Following the resignation of leader Tavish Scott, Rennie stood in the resulting leadership election. He was the only candidate to be nominated, and was declared elected when the nominations closed on 17 May. He vowed to stand up to the "SNP bulldozer" majority, and refused to distance his party from the UK Liberal Democrats.

During the 2014 Scottish independence referendum, Rennie campaigned alongside Better Together to remain in the United Kingdom. He opposes a second independence referendum, favouring a more federal UK.

In the 2016 Scottish Parliament election, the Liberal Democrats again elected five MSPs, while gaining two constituency seats and holding their existing two with increased majorities. Rennie was elected in North East Fife, gaining it from the SNP with a 9.5% swing.

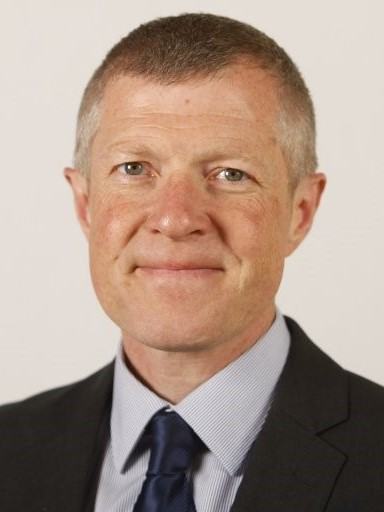
Official Portrait of Rennie in 2016

Rennie was re-elected in North East Fife for the 2021 Scottish Parliament election, with doubled majority. On 12 July 2021, Rennie announced his resignation as leader of the Scottish Liberal Democrats, effective from September. He was replaced by Alex Cole-Hamilton, the MSP for Edinburgh Western.

Rennie was elected in the renamed Fife North East constituency in the 2026 Scottish Parliament election, with again increased vote share.

==== Home Rule commission plan ====
In September 2011, Rennie announced plans for a commission building on the work of the blueprint Lord Steel Commission to develop a blueprint for Home rule and full fiscal federalism that would map out further devolution of powers after the Scotland Bill 2011 was passed into statute.

==== Armed Forces Legal Action ====
Willie Rennie was appointed as an honorary patron of Armed Forces Legal Action (AFLA) in April 2014. AFLA is a network of British law firms offering discounted legal services to members of the British military community, founded by Scottish solicitor and former Scottish Liberal Democrat parliamentary candidate Allan Steele, WS.

Parliament of the United Kingdom
Preceded by Rachel Squire	Member of Parliament for Dunfermline and West Fife; 2006–2010	Succeeded by Thomas Docherty
Scottish Parliament
Preceded by Ted Brocklebank	Member of the Scottish Parliament for Mid Scotland and Fife; 2011–2016	Succeeded by Alexander Stewart
Preceded by Roderick Campbell	Member of the Scottish Parliament for North East Fife; 2016–present	Incumbent
Party political offices
Preceded by Tavish Scott	Leader of the Scottish Liberal Democrats; 2011–2021	Succeeded by Alex Cole-Hamilton
