= Youth Link Movement =

Youth organization

Youth Link Movement (YLM) is a Sri Lankan youth organization which links other youth organizations with each other with the intention of helping underprivileged and isolated youths within the country.

== Overview ==
Inaugurated on 15 February 2007, YLM was founded by a group of law students and gained the patronage of Justice Christopher Weeramantry (former Vice President of the International Court Of Justice). Through the efforts of its board of directors who are also responsible for strategic decision making and oversight. An executive committee is responsible for operational matters.

Membership of YLM is restricted to groups with at least five members and is split into School, University, and Team types. Groups must have undertaken at least one community project in the last two years to join and are required to undertake a community project every calendar year to remain a part of the network.
