= Orkney Islands Council elections =

Local government elections in Orkney Islands, Scotland

Orkney Islands Council in Scotland holds elections every five years, previously holding them every four years from its creation as a single-tier authority in 1995 to 2007.

== Council elections ==
=== As an islands council ===
Year	Orkney Movement	Independent
1974	0	23
1978 (Note: New ward boundaries.)	0	24
1982	1	23
1986	1	23
1990	1	23
1994 (Note: New ward boundaries.) (Note: One seat was unfilled due to a lack of nominations.)	0	27

=== As a unitary authority ===
Year	Green	Orkney Manifesto Group	Independent
1999	0	0	21
2003	0	0	21
2007 (Note: Change to single transferable vote system and new ward boundaries.)	0	0	21
2012	0	0	21
2017 (Note: New ward boundaries.)	1	2	18
2022 (Note: New ward boundaries.)	2	0	19

== Results maps ==
2017 results map

2022 results map

== By-elections ==
=== 2012-2017 ===
Kirkwall West and Orphir By-Election 27 November 2014
Party	Candidate	FPv%	Count
Party	Candidate	FPv%	1
Independent	Leslie Manson	57.5	647
Independent	Gillian Skuse	25.0	281
Independent	Lorraine McBrearty	12.6	142
Independent	Laurence Leonard	4.9	55
Independent hold			
Valid: 1,125 Quota: 563

West Mainland By-Election 18 August 2015
Party	Candidate	FPv%	Count
Party	Candidate	FPv%	1
Orkney Manifesto Group	Rachael King	51.4	593
Independent	Barbara Foulkes	38.6	281
Scottish Green	Fiona Grahame	10.0	115
Orkney Manifesto Group gain from Independent			
Valid: 1,154 Quota: 578

=== 2017-2022 ===
North Isles By-Election 1 October 2020
Party	Candidate	FPv%	Count
Party	Candidate	FPv%	1
Independent	Heather Woodbridge	69.9	638
Labour	Coilla Drake	17.3	158
Independent	Claire Stevens	8.2	75
Independent	Daniel Adams	4.6	42
Independent hold			
Valid: 913 Quota: 457

=== 2022-2027 ===
Stromness and South Isles By-Election 28 March 2024
Party	Candidate	FPv%	Count
Party	Candidate	FPv%	1
Independent	Janette Park	85.7	757
Independent	Magnus Thomson	14.2	125
Independent hold			
Electorate: 2,220 Valid: 882 Spoilt: 1 Quota: 442 Turnout: 883
