= List of active autonomist movements in Europe =

This is a list of currently active automomist movements in Europe. Separatism often refers to territorial autonomy.

== Azerbaijan ==
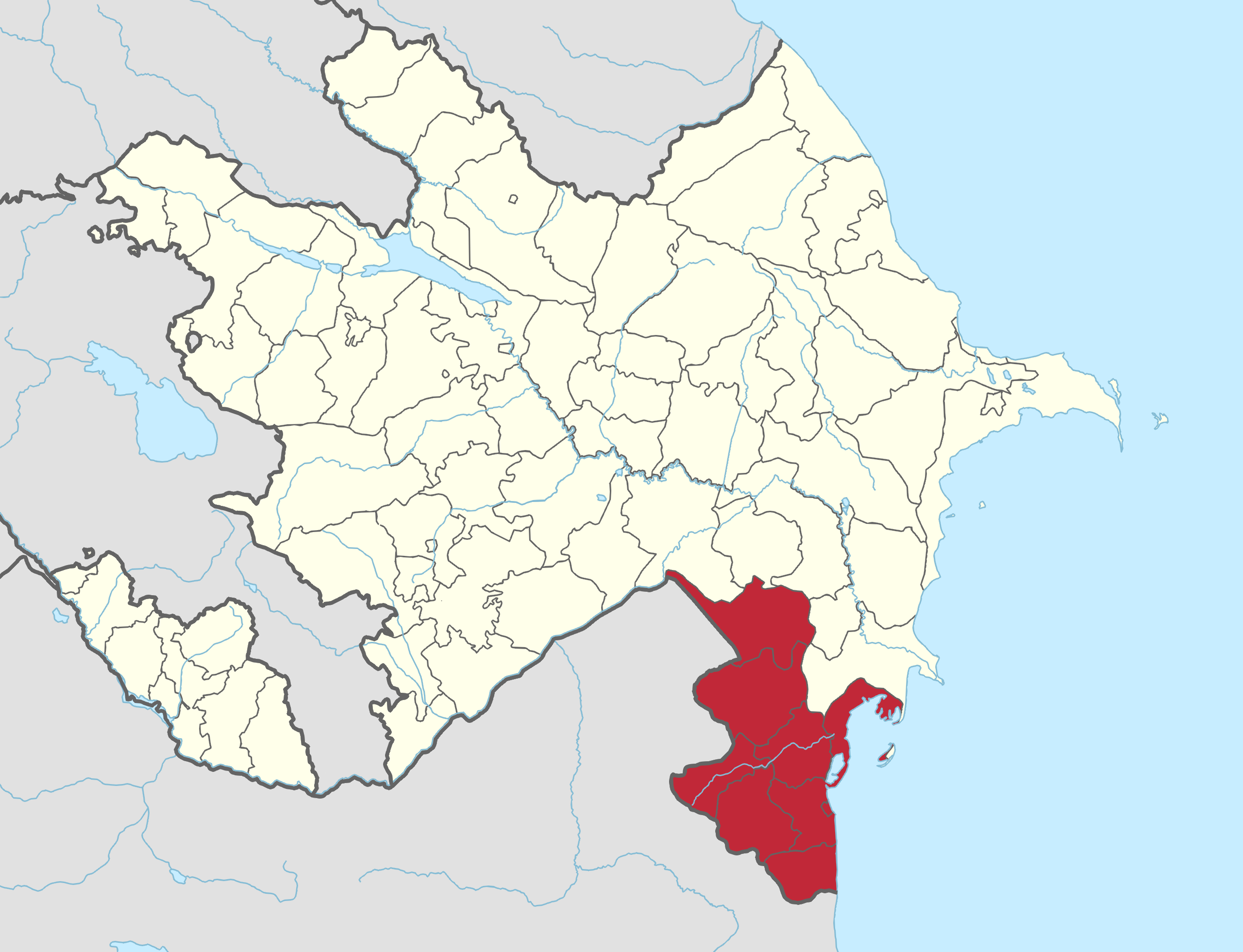
Azerbaijan districts claimed by Talysh-Mughan Autonomous Republic

Territory of the short-lived Talysh-Mughan Autonomous Republic

- People: Talysh people
  - Proposed: Talysh province with regional administration within the borders of Azerbaijan or independence or unification with Caspia.
    - Political organisation: Talysh National Movement
    - Government in exile: Talysh-Mughan Autonomous Republic

== Belgium ==
Flanders

- People: Flemish
  - Autonomous area: Flanders
    - Movements: Flemish Movement

Wallonia

- People: Walloons
  - Autonomous area: Wallonia
    - Movements: Walloon Movement

Brussels-Capital Region

- Peoples: Walloons, Flemish and Brusselaars
  - Proposed: making Brussels-Capital Region its own region
  - Political party: DéFI

== Bosnia and Herzegovina ==
Croatian Community of Herzeg-Bosnia

- People: Croats of Bosnia and Herzegovina
  - Proposed state: Croatian Republic of Herzeg-Bosnia, as a refounded third entity of Bosnia and Herzegovina
    - Political organisation: Croatian National Assembly of Bosnia and Herzegovina
    - Political parties: Croatian Democratic Union of Bosnia and Herzegovina, Croatian Democratic Union 1990, Croatian Christian Democratic Union

== Bulgaria ==
Blagoevgrad Province

- Proposed: autonomy for Pirin Macedonia
  - Advocacy group: United Macedonian Organization Ilinden–Pirin

== Croatia ==
The Istria County in Croatia.

Istria County

- People: Istrians (Croats, Istrian Italians, Istro-Romanians, and Istriot-speakers)
  - Proposed: Autonomy for Istria within Croatia
    - Political party: Istrian Democratic Assembly (factions, not officially)

Dalmatia

Dalmatia

- Ethnic group: Croats of Dalmatia
  - Proposed: autonomy for Dalmatia
    - Political Party: Dalmatian Action (2021)

== Czechia ==
Moravia

- Proposition: Greater autonomy for Moravia
  - People: Moravians
  - Political party: Moravané, Moravian Land Movement

Liberec Region

- Proposition: autonomy for Liberec Region
  - People: Czechs
  - Political party: Mayors for the Liberec Region

== France ==
Alsace

- People: Alsatians (Allemanics)
  - Proposed autonomous area: Alsace
    - Political parties: Elsass Zuerst, Alsatian Alternative, Nationalforum Elsass-Lothringen, Unser Land (EFA member)

Normandy

Location of Normandy

- People: Normans
  - Proposed autonomous area: Normandy
    - Political party: Mouvement Normand

Savoy

- People: Savoyans
  - Proposed autonomous area: Savoy
    - Political party: Movement Règion Savouè (EFA member)

Occitania

- People: Occitans
  - Proposed autonomous area: Occitania
    - Political parties: Partit Occitan (EFA member), Occitan Nationalist Party, Bastir Occitània, Assemblada Occitana, Libertat

Northern Catalonia

- People: Catalans
  - Proposed autonomous region: Pays Catalan, via separation of the Pyrénées-Orientales from the region of Occitania
    - Political parties: Oui au Pays Catalan, Catalan Unity
    - Advocacy organisations: Fem Catalunya Nord (left-wing assembly), Catalunya Nord per la independència, Òmnium Catalunya Nord

Location of Franché-Comte

Franche Comté

- Proposed autonomous area: Franche Comté
  - Political party: Mouvement Franche-Comté, Yes Franche-Comté
    - militant organization: Franche-Comtât Abada!

Alpes-Maritimes

- Proposed: reestablishment of the County of Nice
  - Political party: Ligue pour la restauration des libertés niçoises, Parti niçois

Lorraine

- Ethnic group: Lorrainians
  - Proposed: autonomy for Lorraine
  - Political party: Parti Lorrain

== Germany ==
Bavaria

- People: Bavarians, Franconians, Swabians
  - Proposed state or autonomous area: Free State of Bavaria
    - Political party: Bavaria Party (EFA member)

Franconia

- Proposed autonomous region: Franconia
  - Political party: Party for Franconia

== Italy ==
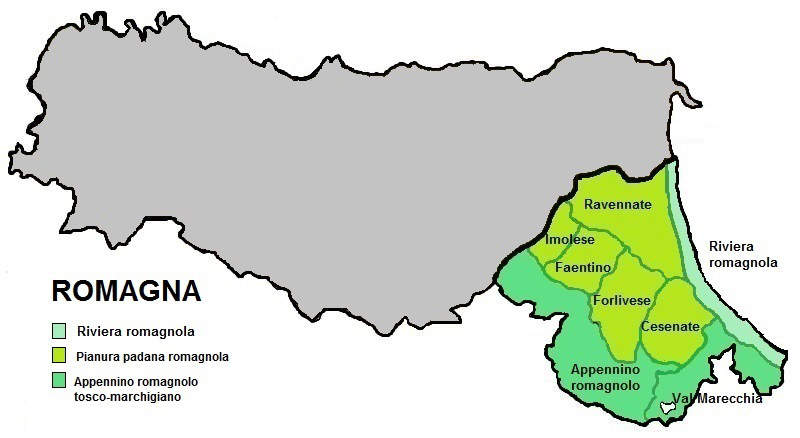
Romagna (shown in green) in the Emilia-Romagna region

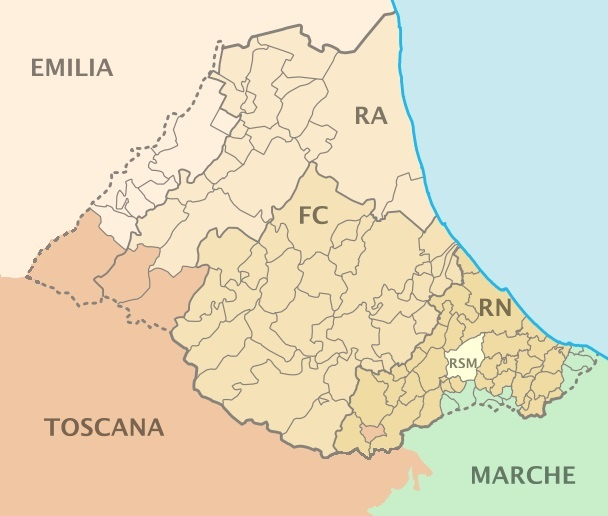
Romagna

Romagna

- Ethnic group: Romagnol people
  - Proposal: divide of Romagna from Emilia-Romagna
  - Political party: Movement for the Autonomy of Romagna, Lega Romagna

Trentino

- Ethnic group: Ladins
  - Proposed: creation of a province of Ladinia

== Lithuania ==
Samogitia

- Ethnic group: Samogitians
  - Proposed autonomous region: Samogitia
    - Political party: Samogitian Party, Dawn of Nemunas

== North Macedonia ==
Ilirida

- Ethnic group: Albanians
  - Proposed: autonomy for Ilirida
  - Advocacy group: Ilirida movement

== Poland ==
Silesia

- People: Silesians
  - Proposed autonomous area: Silesia
    - Political party: Silesian Autonomy Movement, First Self-Governance League, Silesian Regional Party, Silesians Together

Masuria

- People: Poles, Masurians
  - Proposed autonomous area: Masuria
    - Political Party: Ruch Autonomii Mazur

Greater Poland

- People: Poles in Greater Poland Voivodeship
  - Proposed autonomous area: Greater Poland
    - Political party: Konfederacja Wielkopolan

Kashubia

- People: Kashubians
  - Proposed autonomous area: Kashubia
    - Political party: Kashubian Association

== Romania ==
Partium

- People: Hungarians
  - Proposed autonomous area: Partium or unification with Hungary
    - Advocacy organisations: Hungarian National Council of Transylvania

== Switzerland ==
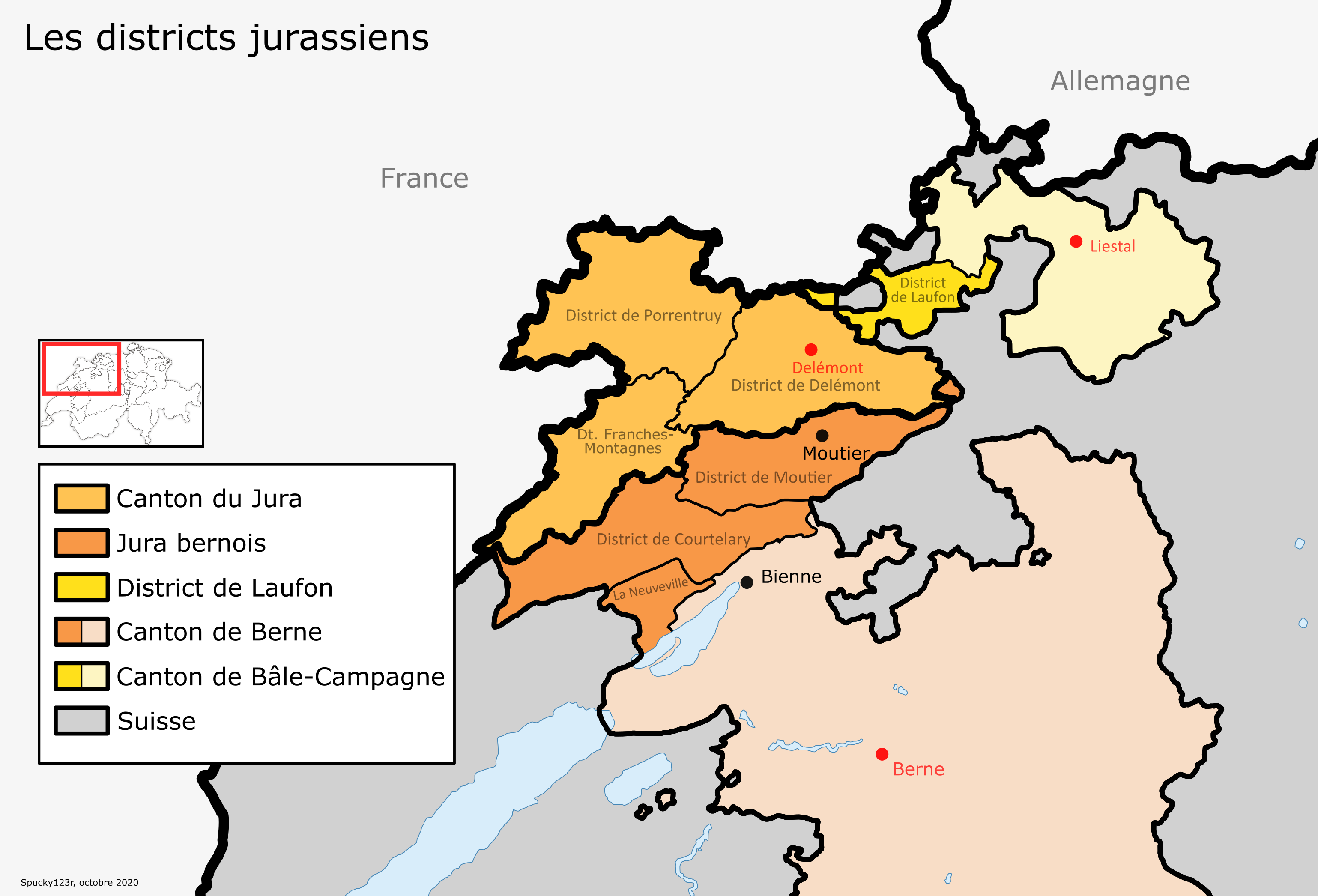
The seven Jura districts in Switzerland

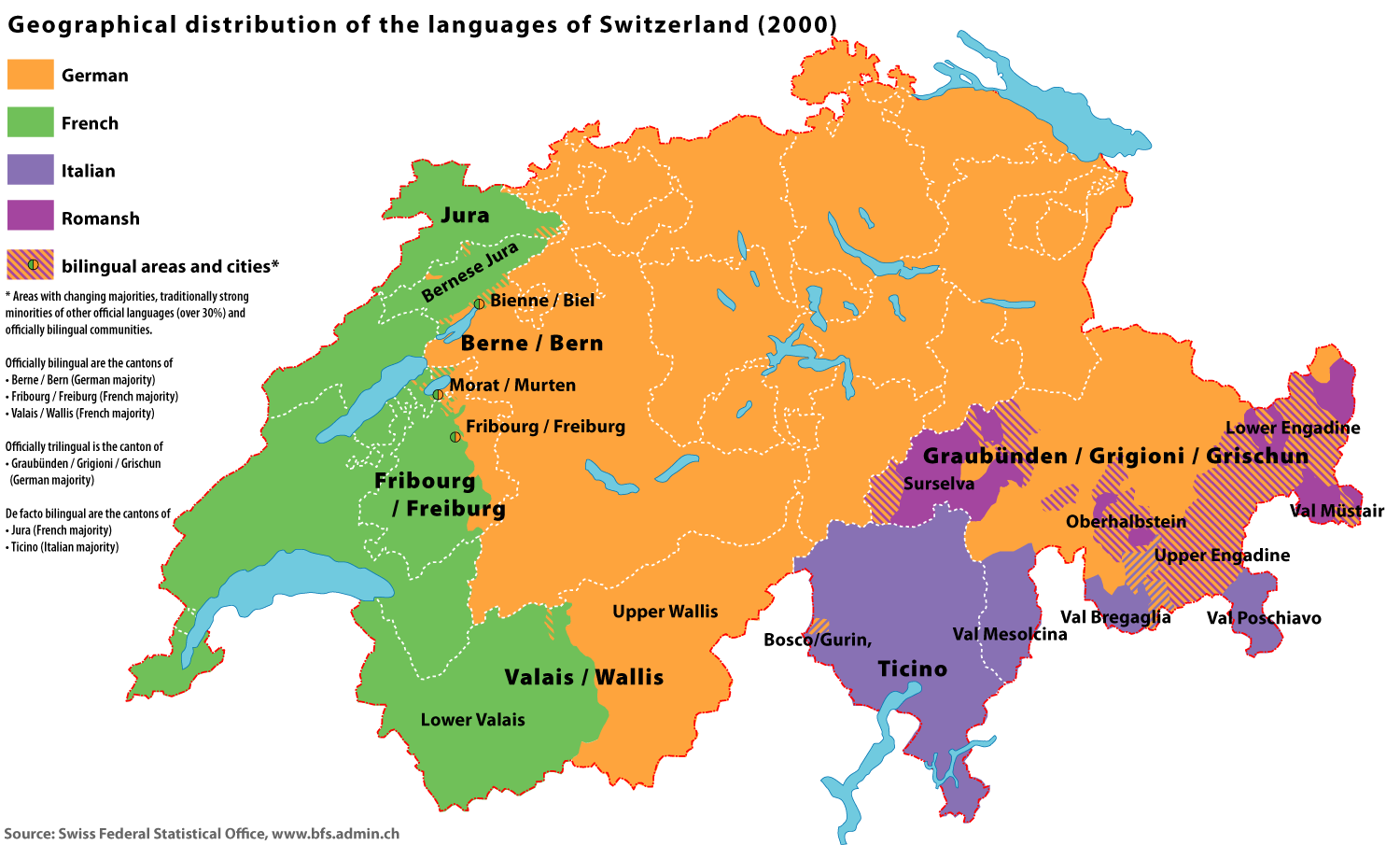
The French-speaking part of Switzerland is shown in green on this map

Autonomist movements

Jura region

- People: Jurassien (French-speaking)
  - Proposed autonomous area: unification of the three districts of Bernese Jura and the Laufen District with the Canton of Jura
    - Militant organisations: Mouvement Autonomiste Jurassien (Jurassian Autonomist Movement), Groupe Bélier (Youth activists movement)

Ticino

- Ethnic group: Swiss Italians
  - Proposed: extended autonomy for Ticino
    - Political party: Ticino League

== United Kingdom ==
Wales

- People: Welsh
  - Proposed state or autonomous region: Wales
    - Political parties: Gwlad, Plaid Cymru, Propel, Plaid Glyndŵr, Wales Green Party, Independent Alliance for Reform
    - Advocacy groups: YesCymru

Canvey Island

- People: Canvey Islanders
  - Proposed autonomous area: Canvey Island
    - Political Parties: Canvey Island Independent Party

Northern Ireland

- People: Irish, Northern Irish (Nationalists)
  - Proposed state: Re-unification with Ireland or independence
    - Political parties: Sinn Féin, Fianna Fáil, Éirígí, Social Democratic and Labour Party, Aontú, People Before Profit, Communist Party of Ireland, Irish Republican Socialist Party, Republican Network for Unity, Socialist Workers Network, Workers' Party of Ireland
    - Militant organisations: RIRA, CIRA

Shetland

- People: People of Shetland
  - Proposed autonomous area: Shetland
    - Advocacy group: Wir Shetland
    - Political Parties: Shetland Movement, Orkney and Shetland Movement, Scottish Green Party

Wessex

- People: People of Wessex
  - Proposed: autonomy for Wessex
    - Political party: Wessex Regionalists
    - Advocacy group: Wessex Constitutional Convention

Orkney Islands

- People: Orkney islanders
  - Proposed: Autonomy within the United Kingdom or self governance under Norway
    - Advocacy group: Orkney Council
    - Political Parties: Orkney and Shetland Movement
