= 1982 Shetland Islands Area Council election =

1982 Scottish local government election

1982 Shetland Islands Council election
← 1978	May 4, 1982	1986 →

All 25 seats to Shetland Islands Council 13 seats needed for a majority
	First party	Second party
Leader	A.I. Tulloch
Party	Independent	Labour
Leader's seat	Aithsting and Sandsting
Last election	22	3
Seats won	23	2
Seat change	▲1	▼1
Popular vote	2,991	222
Percentage	87.8%	6.5%
Swing	▲6.7%	▼12.4%
Council Convener before election
A.I. Tulloch
Independent
Council Convener after election
A.I. Tulloch
Independent

Results by electoral district.

An election to Shetland Islands Council was held on 6 May 1982 as part of the 1982 Scottish regional elections and yielded a swing to candidates supportive of Home Rule for the islands. Whilst no candidates appeared on the ballot as members of the Shetland Movement (all Shetland candidates were independents), the Shetland Movement did publish a list of candidates supportive of Shetland Home Rule. Ultimately of the 25 members of the Shetland council, 14 were supporters of the movement.

Supporters of island autonomy similarly contested council elections in neighboring Orkney.

The councils for the Shetland Islands, Orkney, and the Western Isles operated as combined authorities, meaning that instead of having both regional and district governance, the Islands had a single level combined of governance. These councils were elected at the same time as Scottish regional councils.

== Aggregate results ==
Shetland Islands Council election, 1982
Party	Seats	Gains	Losses	Net gain/loss	Seats %	Votes %	Votes	+/−
Independent	23	1	0	▲1	92.0	87.8	2,991	▲6.7
Labour	2	0	1	▼1	8.0	6.5	222	▼12.4
Ratepayers	0	0	0	0	0.0	5.7	194	New

== Ward results ==
1st, Lerwick Sound
Party	Candidate	Votes	%
Independent	John Graham	Unopposed	

2nd, Lerwick–Clickimin
Party	Candidate	Votes	%
Independent	Thomas M. Y. Manson	121	35.4%
Independent	Cecil B. Eunson	112	32.7%
Independent	Ian Byrne (Incumbent)	109	31.9%
Majority		9	2.7%
Turnout			
Independent hold			

3rd, Lerwick–North
Party	Candidate	Votes	%
Independent	Leonard G. Groat	221	52.0%
Ratepayers	Robert Tulloch (Incumbent)	194	48.0%
Majority		17	4.0%
Turnout			
Independent gain from Ratepayers			

4th, Lerwick Central
Party	Candidate	Votes	%
Labour	Bill Smith (Incumbent)	Unopposed	

5th, Lerwick Harbour
Party	Candidate	Votes	%
Independent	Edward Thomason (Incumbent)	Unopposed	

6th, Lerwick Twageos
Party	Candidate	Votes	%
Independent	Sandy Clunes (Incumbent)	Unopposed	

7th, Lerwick Breiwick
Party	Candidate	Votes	%
Independent	Leslie Eunson	Unopposed	

8th, Unst
Party	Candidate	Votes	%
Independent	Alan B. Fraser	157	41.1%
Independent	Karl M. Gray	148	38.7%
Independent	William Playfair (Incumbent)	77	20.2%
Majority		9	2.4%
Turnout			
Independent hold			

9th, Yell North
Party	Candidate	Votes	%
Independent	David Johnson (Incumbent)	Unopposed	

10th, Yell South
Party	Candidate	Votes	%
Independent	Stewart Gray (Incumbent)	Unopposed	

11th, Northmavine
Party	Candidate	Votes	%
Labour	Christopher D. Dowle (Incumbent)	222	55.8%
Independent	Gilbert J. Mowat	127	31.9%
Independent	William J. Beattie	49	12.3%
Majority		95	23.9%
Turnout			
Labour gain from Independent			

12th, Delting North
Party	Candidate	Votes	%
Independent	Fraser Paterson	Unopposed	

13th, Delting South
Party	Candidate	Votes	%
Independent	Albert Hunter (Incumbent)	Unopposed	

14th, Nesting and Lunnasting
Party	Candidate	Votes	%
Independent	Benji Hunter (Incumbent)	Unopposed	

15th, Bressay
Party	Candidate	Votes	%
Independent	James Irvine (Incumbent)	Unopposed	

16th, Scalloway
Party	Candidate	Votes	%
Independent	William Anderson	Unopposed	

17th, Whiteness, Weisdale and Tingwall
Party	Candidate	Votes	%
Independent	Cecil R. H. Eunson	258	55.7%
Independent	Florence B. Grains (Incumbent)	205	44.3%
Majority		53	11.4%
Turnout			

18th, Whalsay and Skerries
Party	Candidate	Votes	%
Independent	Henry Stewart (Incumbent)	Unopposed	

19th, Sandsting and Aithsting
Party	Candidate	Votes	%
Independent	Alexander Tulloch (Incumbent)	247	57.6%
Independent	William Tait	182	42.4%
Majority		65	15.2%
Turnout			

20th, Sandness and Walls
Party	Candidate	Votes	%
Independent	Gordon Walterson (Incumbent)	Unopposed	

21st, Cunningsburgh
Party	Candidate	Votes	%
Independent	Joan Macleod	Unopposed	

22nd, Burra and Trondra
Party	Candidate	Votes	%
Independent	William A. Cumming	316	75.2%
Independent	Susan G. Morrow-Irvine	104	24.8%
Majority		212	50.4%
Turnout			

23rd, Sandwick
Party	Candidate	Votes	%
Independent	Malcolm S. Bray	198	57.9%
Independent	Peter Watts	144	42.1%
Majority		54	15.8%
Turnout			

24th, Dunrossness North
Party	Candidate	Votes	%
Independent	William Tait (Incumbent)	Unopposed	

25th, Dunrossness South
Party	Candidate	Votes	%
Independent	Raymond R. Bentley (Incumbent)	142	65.7%
Independent	John F. D. MacKenzie	74	34.3%
Majority		68	31.4%
Turnout			

== By-elections since 1982 ==
1982 Delting North by-election
Party	Candidate	Votes	%
Labour	Roberta Clubb	Unopposed	
Labour gain from Independent			

1983 Delting North by-election
Party	Candidate	Votes	%
Independent	Andrea Manson	337	76.8%
Labour	Paul Thorn	102	23.2%
Majority		235	53.6%
Turnout			
Independent gain from Labour			
