= 1986 Shetland Islands Council election =

1986 Scottish local government election

← 1982	May 4, 1986	1990 →

All 25 seats to Shetland Islands Council 13 seats needed for a majority
	First party	Second party	Third party
Leader		Edward Thomason
Party	Independent	Shetland Movement	Labour
Leader's seat		Lerwick Harbour
Last election	23	0	2
Seats won	16	5	4
Seat change	▼7	▲5	▲2
Popular vote	4,015	819	997
Percentage	66.9%	13.6%	16.6%
Swing	▼20.9%	N/A	▲10.1%
Council Convener before election
A.I. Tulloch
Independent
Council Convener after election
Edward Thomason
Shetland Movement

Results by electoral district.

An election to Shetland Islands Council was held on 8 May 1986 as part of the Scottish regional elections. The election saw Labour gain another two seats on the Shetland Islands Council, and also saw the Shetland Movement contest the election on a party political platform for the first time. The outgoing three-term Convener, A.I. Tulloch, died just one day before the election.

== Aggregate results ==
Shetland Islands Council election, 1986
Party	Seats	Gains	Losses	Net gain/loss	Seats %	Votes %	Votes	+/−
Independent	16	0	6	▼7	64.0	66.9	4,015	▼20.9
Shetland Movement	5	5	0	▲5	20.0	13.6	819	N/A
Labour	4	2	0	▲2	16.0	16.6	997	▲10.1
Independent Progressive	0	0	0	0	0.0	1.8	107	New
Independent Liberal	0	0	0	0	0.0	1.0	60	New

== Ward results ==
Aithsting and Sandsting
Party	Candidate	Votes	%
Independent	Florence Grains	211	51.2%
Independent	Harold Leask	201	48.8%
Majority		10	2.4%
Independent hold			

Bressay
Party	Candidate	Votes	%
Independent	James Irvine (Incumbent)	135	69.2%
Independent Liberal	Roy Whitehead	60	30.8%
Majority		75	38.4%
Independent hold			

Burra and Trondra
Party	Candidate	Votes	%
Shetland Movement	William Cumming (Incumbent)	unopposed	unopposed
Majority		unopposed	unopposed
Shetland Movement gain from Independent			

Delting North
Party	Candidate	Votes	%
Independent	Andrea Manson (Incumbent)	319	68.0%
Labour	Fred Amphlett	150	32.0%
Majority		169	36.0%
Independent hold			

Delting South
Party	Candidate	Votes	%
Independent	Albert Hunter (Incumbent)	unopposed	unopposed
Majority		unopposed	unopposed
Independent hold			

Dunrossness North
Party	Candidate	Votes	%
Independent	William Tait (Incumbent)	288	85.0%
Independent	Annette Mitchell	51	15.0%
Majority		237	60.0%
Independent hold			

Dunrossness South
Party	Candidate	Votes	%
Independent	Magnus Flaws	195	78.0%
Independent	Raymond Bentley (Incumbent)	55	22.0%
Majority		140	56.0%
Independent hold			

Gulberwick, Quarff and Cunningsburgh
Party	Candidate	Votes	%
Independent	Joan McLeod (Incumbent)	240	55.3%
Independent	David Nicolson	194	44.7%
Majority		46	10.6%
Independent hold			

Lerwick Breiwick
Party	Candidate	Votes	%
Independent	Cecil Eunson	203	60.6%
Independent	Dorothy Stables	107	31.9%
Independent	Robert Tait	25	7.5%
Majority		96	28.7%
Independent hold			

Lerwick Central
Party	Candidate	Votes	%
Labour	Bill Smith (Incumbent)	unopposed	unopposed
Majority		unopposed	unopposed
Labour hold			

Lerwick Clickimin
Party	Candidate	Votes	%
Shetland Movement	T.M.Y. Manson (Incumbent)	216	74.2%
Independent	Ian Byrne	75	25.8%
Majority		141	48.4%
Shetland Movement gain from Independent			

Lerwick Harbour
Party	Candidate	Votes	%
Shetland Movement	Edward Thomason (Incumbent)	unopposed	unopposed
Majority		unopposed	unopposed
Shetland Movement gain from Independent			

Lerwick North
Party	Candidate	Votes	%
Labour	Leonard Groat (Incumbent)	328	55.9%
Independent	Michael Thomson	259	44.1%
Majority		69	11.8%
Labour hold			

Lerwick Sound
Party	Candidate	Votes	%
Shetland Movement	John Graham (Incumbent)	unopposed	unopposed
Majority		unopposed	unopposed
Shetland Movement gain from Independent			

Lerwick Twageos
Party	Candidate	Votes	%
Labour	James J. Paton	281	70.6%
Shetland Movement	Sandy Cluness (Incumbent)	117	29.4%
Majority		164	41.2%
Labour gain from Independent			

Nesting and Lunnasting
Party	Candidate	Votes	%
Independent	Benji Hunter (Incumbent)	unopposed	unopposed
Majority		unopposed	unopposed
Independent hold			

Northmavine
Party	Candidate	Votes	%
Labour	Chris Dowle (Incumbent)	238	76.3%
Independent	William Beattie	74	23.7%
Majority		164	52.6%
Labour hold			

Sandness and Walls
Party	Candidate	Votes	%
Independent	James Nicolson	179	42.5%
Shetland Movement	Gordon Walterson (Incumbent)	163	38.7%
Independent	Chris Young	79	18.8%
Majority		16	3.8%
Independent hold			

Sandwick
Party	Candidate	Votes	%
Shetland Movement	Malcolm Bray (Incumbent)	165	47.3%
Independent	Peter Watts	124	35.5%
Independent	Graham Jamieson	60	17.2%
Majority		41	11.8%
Shetland Movement gain from Independent			

Scalloway
Party	Candidate	Votes	%
Independent	William Anderson (Incumbent)	unopposed	unopposed
Majority		unopposed	unopposed
Independent hold			

Unst
Party	Candidate	Votes	%
Independent	Elizabeth Nicolson	186	42.6%
Shetland Movement	Tom Ellis	158	36.2%
Independent	John Ritch	48	11.0%
Independent	Alan Fraser (Incumbent)	45	10.3%
Majority		28	6.4%
Independent hold			

Whalsay & Skerries
Party	Candidate	Votes	%
Independent	Henry Stewart (Incumbent)	unopposed	unopposed
Majority		unopposed	unopposed
Independent hold			

Whiteness, Weisdale and Tingwall
Party	Candidate	Votes	%
Independent	Alex Arthur	194	43.4%
Independent	Cecil Eunson (Incumbent)	172	38.5%
Independent	Charles Johnson	81	18.1%
Majority		22	4.9%
Independent hold			

Yell North and Fetlar
Party	Candidate	Votes	%
Independent	David Johnson (Incumbent)	unopposed	unopposed
Majority		unopposed	unopposed
Independent hold			

Yell South
Party	Candidate	Votes	%
Independent	Stewart Gray (Incumbent)	152	43.8%
Independent	Robert Johnson	114	32.9%
Independent	Daniel Spence	81	23.3%
Majority		38	10.9%
Independent hold			

== By-elections since 1986 ==
1987 Sandwick by-election
Party	Candidate	Votes	%
Independent	James Smith	147	36.8%
Independent	Eddie Barclay	136	34.0%
Independent	Graham Jamieson	117	29.3%
Majority		11	2.8%
Independent gain from Shetland Movement			

1988 Lerwick Twageos by-election
Party	Candidate	Votes	%
Independent	Michael Johnston	246	70.1%
Labour	Robert Adair	66	18.8%
Independent	Ian Selbie	39	11.1%
Majority		11	2.8%
Independent gain from Labour			
