= 1982 Orkney Islands Council election =

Scottish local election

← 1978	4 May 1982	1986 →

All 24 seats to Orkney Islands Council 13 seats needed for a majority
	First party	Second party
Leader	Edwin Eunson	Spencer Rosie
Party	Independents	Orkney Movement
Leader's seat	Kirkwall Broadsands	Kirkwall Weyland
Last election	24	0
Seats won	23	1
Seat change	▼1	▲1
Popular vote	3,114	135
Percentage	86.5%	3.8%
Swing	▼13.5pp	New
Council Convener before election
Edwin Eunson
Independent
Council Convener after election
Edwin Eunson
Independent

The 1982 Orkney Islands Council election, the third election to Orkney Islands Council, was held on 4 May 1982 as part of the wider 1982 Scottish regional elections.

The election saw the Independents take all save one of the seats on the council as the pro-autonomy Orkney Movement contested its first election, winning one seat. Two other Orkney Movement members, Billy Dass and Chris Soames, were elected as independent candidates.

== Results ==
1982 Orkney Islands election
Party	Seats	Gains	Losses	Net gain/loss	Seats %	Votes %	Votes	+/−
Independent	23	0	1	▼1		86.5	3,114	▼13.5
Orkney Movement	1	1	0	▲1		3.8	135	New
Labour	0	0	0	0	0.0	9.7	350	New

== Ward results ==
Kirkwall St Magnus
Party	Candidate	Votes	%
Independent	J. McRae (Incumbent)	156	66.7%
Labour	R. Presland	77	32.9%
Majority		79	33.8%
Independent hold			

Kirkwall Weyland
Party	Candidate	Votes	%
Orkney Movement	Spencer Rosie	135	41.8%
Independent	James Melrose (Incumbent)	102	31.6%
Independent	James Hine	53	16.4%
Labour	A. Bain	31	9.6%
Majority		33	10.2%
Orkney Movement gain from Independent			

Kirkwall Broadsands
Party	Candidate	Votes	%
Independent	Edwin Eunson (Incumbent)	221	73.4%
Labour	J. Johnson	80	26.6%
Majority		141	46.8%
Independent hold			

Kirkwall St Olafs
Party	Candidate	Votes	%
Independent	J. Marwick (Incumbent)	240	78.9%
Independent	G. Harcus	64	21.1%
Majority		176	57.8%
Independent hold			

Kirkwall Quoybanks
Party	Candidate	Votes	%
Independent	A. Stranger (Incumbent)	unopposed	unopposed
Majority		unopposed	unopposed
Independent hold			

Kirkwall Papdale
Party	Candidate	Votes	%
Independent	Allan Taylor (Incumbent)	123	64.4%
Independent	Alma Fotheringhame	68	35.6%
Majority		55	28.8%
Independent hold			

Stromness West
Party	Candidate	Votes	%
Independent	Ian Argo	227	73.7%
Labour	E. Bevan	80	26.0%
Majority		147	47.7%
Independent hold			

Stromness Central
Party	Candidate	Votes	%
Independent	Brenda Robertson (Incumbent)	unopposed	unopposed
Majority		unopposed	unopposed
Independent hold			

Stromness North
Party	Candidate	Votes	%
Independent	John Chalmers (Incumbent)	unopposed	unopposed
Majority		unopposed	unopposed
Independent hold			

St Ola
Party	Candidate	Votes	%
Independent	E. Harcus (Incumbent)	154	65.0%
Labour	D. Holland	82	34.6%
Majority		72	30.4%
Independent hold			

Firth & Harray
Party	Candidate	Votes	%
Independent	Eoin Scott (Incumbent)	256	61.7%
Independent	R. Sabiston	159	38.3%
Majority		97	23.4%
Independent hold			

Orphir & Stenness
Party	Candidate	Votes	%
Independent	Hugh Halcro-Johnston (Incumbent)	unopposed	unopposed
Majority		unopposed	unopposed
Independent hold			

Sandwick
Party	Candidate	Votes	%
Independent	J. Robertson (Incumbent)	unopposed	unopposed
Majority		unopposed	unopposed
Independent hold			

St Andrews & Deerness
Party	Candidate	Votes	%
Independent	Jackie Tait (Incumbent)	unopposed	unopposed
Majority		unopposed	unopposed
Independent hold			

Birsay
Party	Candidate	Votes	%
Independent	John Brown (Incumbent)	unopposed	unopposed
Majority		unopposed	unopposed
Independent hold			

Evie & Rendall
Party	Candidate	Votes	%
Independent	George Stevenson (Incumbent)	unopposed	unopposed
Majority		unopposed	unopposed
Independent hold			

Holm
Party	Candidate	Votes	%
Independent	Alastair Scholes (Incumbent)	120	59.7%
Independent	A. Heddle	81	40.3%
Majority		39	10.4%
Independent hold			

Ronaldsay South & Burray
Party	Candidate	Votes	%
Independent	Billy Dass	288	51.6%
Independent	Alex Annal (Incumbent)	270	48.4%
Majority		18	3.2%
Independent hold			

Hoy & Graemsay
Party	Candidate	Votes	%
Independent	C. Rioch	179	49.6%
Independent	Ewen Traill (Incumbent)	129	35.7%
Independent	T. Thomson	52	14.4%
Majority		50	13.9%
Independent hold			

Ronaldsay North & Sanday
Party	Candidate	Votes	%
Independent	J. Towrie (Incumbent)	unopposed	unopposed
Majority		unopposed	unopposed
Independent hold			

Westray & Papa Westray
Party	Candidate	Votes	%
Independent	J. Scott (Incumbent)	unopposed	unopposed
Majority		unopposed	unopposed
Independent hold			

Eday & Stronsay
Party	Candidate	Votes	%
Independent	J. Groat (Incumbent)	unopposed	unopposed
Majority		unopposed	unopposed
Independent hold			

Rousay & Egilsay
Party	Candidate	Votes	%
Independent	Chris Soames	76	44.2%
Independent	I. Owen (Incumbent)	73	42.4%
Independent	R. Clark	23	13.4%
Majority		3	1.8%
Independent hold			

Shapinsay
Party	Candidate	Votes	%
Independent	J. Sinclair (Incumbent)	unopposed	unopposed
Majority		unopposed	unopposed
Independent hold			
