= 1982 Lothian Regional Council election =

1982 Scottish local government election

Map showing results by Lothian Regional Electoral District.

The third election to Lothian Regional Council was held on 6 May 1982 and yielded a swing to the Conservatives. Whilst the Labour presence was reduced, the Conservatives were unable to win an outright majority, and both parties exited the election with 22 seats. The council Conservative group, under Brian Meek, was able to take over the council however due to support from the SDP-Liberal Alliance councillors.

Turnout was 47.6%, giving the Lothians the highest regional turnout rates in the 1982 Scottish regional elections. The turnout was also an increase of 3.7% on the turnout for the 1978 elections.

== Background ==
The Lothian Regional Council had been a key battleground in a fierce ideological battle between a new, younger generation of radical left-wing Labour activists elected in the 1980 election, and the incumbent Thatcherite Conservative government. In a precursor to the Rate-capping rebellion, several Scottish councils had refused to implement spending cuts necessitated due to a cut in funding from George Younger, the then Secretary of State for Scotland. Lothian in particular had seen its funding cut to the tune of £47 million in July 1981.

The Labour leader of Lothian Regional Council; John Mulvey, pursued a policy of resisting the cuts, and claimed that Labour had a popular mandate to protect jobs and services through increasing local expenditure. The Lothian council, alongside the councils of certain other Scottish regions, planned spending above government guidelines. Younger responded by cutting the Lothian budget by a further £30 million, and the council caved in to pressure.

== Aggregate results ==
Lothian Regional election, 1982
Party	Seats	Gains	Losses	Net gain/loss	Seats %	Votes %	Votes	+/−
Labour	22	0	▼4	▼4	44.90	30.65	85,452	▼9.6
Conservative	22	▲4	0	▲4	44.90	30.37	84,673	▼2.8
Alliance	3	▲2	0	▲2	6.12	26.14	72,860	▲21.7
SNP	1	0	▼2	▼2	2.04	11.63	32,412	▼8.7
Independent	1	0	0	0	2.04	0.74	2,059	▼0.8
Protestant Crusade Against the Papal Visit (PCAPV)	0	0	0	0	0.00	0.25	694	New
Ecology	0	0	0	0	0.00	0.11	334	New
Communist	0	0	0	0	0.00	0.10	288	▼0.3

278,772
