= 1994 Orkney Islands Council election =

1994 Scottish local government election

← 1990	May 5, 1994	1999 →

All 28 seats to Orkney Islands Council 15 seats needed for a majority
	First party
Leader	Jackie Tait
Party	Independent
Leader's seat	St Andrews/Deerness (defeated)
Last election	23
Seats won	27
Seat change	▲4
Popular vote	2,735
Percentage	100.0%
Swing	▲2.4pp
- The result of the election
Council Convener before election
Jackie Tait
Independent
Council Convener after election
Hugh Halcro-Johnston
Independent

The 1994 Orkney Islands Council election, the sixth election to Orkney Islands Council, was held on 5 May 1994 as part of the wider 1994 Scottish regional elections. The election saw Independent candidates take all seats available, except for the ward of Kirkwall Pickaquoy, which had no nominations.

== Aggregate Results ==
Orkney Islands Council election, 1994
Party	Seats	Gains	Losses	Net gain/loss	Seats %	Votes %	Votes	+/−
Independent	27	4	0	▲4		100.0	2,735	▲2.4
Vacant	1							

== Ward results ==
Kirkwall Pickaquoy
Party	Candidate	Votes	%
	No nominations		

Kirkwall Craigiefield
Party	Candidate	Votes	%
Independent	Alasdair Thom (Incumbent)	unopposed	unopposed
Majority		unopposed	unopposed
Independent hold			

Kirkwall Broadsands
Party	Candidate	Votes	%
Independent	J. MacDonald (Incumbent)	unopposed	unopposed
Majority		unopposed	unopposed
Independent hold			

Kirkwall Lynnfield
Party	Candidate	Votes	%
Independent	I. Clyde (Incumbent)	unopposed	unopposed
Majority		unopposed	unopposed
Independent hold			

Kirkwall Quoybanks
Party	Candidate	Votes	%
Independent	N. Craigie (Incumbent)	unopposed	unopposed
Majority		unopposed	unopposed
Independent hold			

Kirkwall Papdale East
Party	Candidate	Votes	%
Independent	J. Finnie (Incumbent)	unopposed	unopposed
Majority		unopposed	unopposed
Independent hold			

Kirkwall Bignold
Party	Candidate	Votes	%
Independent	A. Croy (Incumbent)	unopposed	unopposed
Majority		unopposed	unopposed
Independent hold			

Kirkwall Berstane
Party	Candidate	Votes	%
Independent	J. Marwick	unopposed	unopposed
Majority		unopposed	unopposed
Independent hold			

Kirkwall St. Magnus
Party	Candidate	Votes	%
Independent	Ian MacDonald	unopposed	unopposed
Majority		unopposed	unopposed
Independent hold			

Stromness South
Party	Candidate	Votes	%
Independent	B. Murray	unopposed	unopposed
Majority		unopposed	unopposed
Independent hold			

Stromness Central
Party	Candidate	Votes	%
Independent	J. Brown	192	60.7%
Independent	Brenda Robertson (Incumbent)	124	39.2%
Majority		68	21.4%
Independent hold			

Stromness North
Party	Candidate	Votes	%
Independent	Ian Argo (Incumbent)	unopposed	unopposed
Majority		unopposed	unopposed
Independent hold			

Orphir & Scapa
Party	Candidate	Votes	%
Independent	Hugh Halcro-Johnston (Incumbent)	222	63.4%
Independent	BJ. Grainger	128	36.5%
Majority		94	26.8%
Independent hold			

Firth & Sunnybrae
Party	Candidate	Votes	%
Independent	Eoin Scott	291	70.8%
Independent	K. Hutchison (Incumbent)	120	29.2%
Majority		171	41.6%
Independent hold			

Harray & Stenness
Party	Candidate	Votes	%
Independent	M. Bichan	unopposed	unopposed
Majority		unopposed	unopposed
Independent hold			

Evie & Rendall
Party	Candidate	Votes	%
Independent	Jimmy Moar (Incumbent)	unopposed	unopposed
Majority		unopposed	unopposed
Independent hold			

Birsay
Party	Candidate	Votes	%
Independent	A. Johnson	294	88.0%
Independent	I. Bennett	40	11.9%
Majority		254	76.1%
Independent hold			

Sandwick
Party	Candidate	Votes	%
Independent	George Wylie (Incumbent)	unopposed	unopposed
Majority		unopposed	unopposed
Independent hold			

St Andrews & Deerness
Party	Candidate	Votes	%
Independent	J. Foubister	216	55.5%
Independent	Jackie Tait (Incumbent)	173	44.4%
Majority		43	11.0%
Independent hold			

Holm & Wideford
Party	Candidate	Votes	%
Independent	W. Sinclair (Incumbent)	257	76.9%
Independent	R. Campbell	77	23.0%
Majority		43	53.8%
Independent hold			

Burray & South Ronaldsay
Party	Candidate	Votes	%
Independent	C. Annal (Incumbent)	unopposed	unopposed
Majority		unopposed	unopposed
Independent hold			

St. Margaret's Hope
Party	Candidate	Votes	%
Independent	N. Smith	164	69.7%
Independent	R. Thomson	71	30.2%
Majority		93	39.4%
Independent hold			

Hoy & Graemsay
Party	Candidate	Votes	%
Independent	K. Sutherland	159	51.4%
Independent	T. Thomson	87	28.1%
Independent	A. Reid	73	20.3%
Majority		72	23.3%
Independent hold			

Rousay, Egilsay & Wire
Party	Candidate	Votes	%
Independent	S. Hill	109	66.8%
Independent	B. Mainland (Incumbent)	54	33.1%
Majority		55	33.6%
Independent hold			

Shapinsay
Party	Candidate	Votes	%
Independent	J. Sinclair (Incumbent)	unopposed	unopposed
Majority		unopposed	unopposed
Independent hold			

Stronsay & Eday
Party	Candidate	Votes	%
Independent	George Stevenson (Incumbent)	174	71.3%
Independent	A. Stewart	70	28.6%
Majority		104	42.6%
Independent hold			

Sanday & North Ronaldsay
Party	Candidate	Votes	%
Independent	Howie Firth (Incumbent)	174	68.5%
Independent	R. Sabiston	80	31.5%
Majority		94	37.0%
Independent hold			

Westray & Papa Westray
Party	Candidate	Votes	%
Independent	Stephen Hagan (Incumbent)	348	87.8%
Independent	T. Rendall	26	6.5%
Independent	J. Rendall	22	5.5%
Majority		322	81.3%
Independent hold			
