= 1982 Tayside Regional Council election =

Third election to Tayside Regional Council

Interactive map of results in the 46 Tayside electoral divisions

The third election to Tayside Regional Council was held on 6 May 1982 as part of the wider 1982 Scottish regional elections. The election saw the Conservatives strengthening their control of the region's 46-seat council.

== Results ==
1982 Tayside Regional Council election result
Party	Seats	Gains	Losses	Net gain/loss	Seats %	Votes %	Votes	+/−
Conservative	27			▲2	58.7			
Labour	12			▼3	26.1			
SNP	5			▲5	10.9			
Independent	2			▼4	4.3			
Alliance	0			Steady	0.0			
