= 1978 Shetland Islands Council election =

1978 Scottish local government election

- May 2, 1978

All 25 seats to Shetland Islands Council 13 seats needed for a majority
	First party	Second party
Leader	A.I. Tulloch
Party	Independent	Labour
Leader's seat	Aithsting and Sandsting
Last election	18	4
Seats won	21	4
Seat change	▲3	0
Popular vote	4,039	941
Percentage	81.1%	18.9%
Swing	▼8.7%	▲8.7%
Council Convener before election
A.I. Tulloch
Independent
Council Convener after election
A.I. Tulloch
Independent

Results by electoral district.

Elections to the Shetland Islands Council were held on 2 May 1978 as part of Scottish regional elections, with 11 seats uncontested. The election saw 14 new councillors enter the Shetland Islands Council, an unusually large number, in part attributable to the charged political context surrounding the devolution debate of the late 1970s. Several of these incomers consisted of members of the pro-autonomy Shetland Group, later to become the Shetland Movement, and local Scottish National Party branch, registered as independents.

== Aggregate results ==
Shetland Islands Council election, 1978
Party	Seats	Gains	Losses	Net gain/loss	Seats %	Votes %	Votes	+/−
Independent	21	3	0	▲3	88.0	81.1	4,039	▼8.7
Labour	4	0	0	0	12.0	18.9	941	▲8.7

== Ward results ==
Aithsting and Sandsting
Party	Candidate	Votes	%
Independent	A.I. Tulloch (Incumbent)	unopposed	unopposed
Majority		unopposed	unopposed
Independent hold			

Bressay
Party	Candidate	Votes	%
Independent	James Irvine (Incumbent)	unopposed	unopposed
Majority		unopposed	unopposed
Independent hold			

Burra and Trondra
Party	Candidate	Votes	%
Independent	Arthur Williamson	174	51.8%
Independent	William Cumming (Incumbent)	162	48.2%
Majority		12	3.6%
Independent hold			

Delting North
Party	Candidate	Votes	%
Independent	Fraser Peterson (Incumbent)	unopposed	unopposed
Majority		unopposed	unopposed
Independent hold			

Delting South
Party	Candidate	Votes	%
Independent	Albert Hunter	unopposed	unopposed
Majority		unopposed	unopposed
Independent hold			

Dunrossness North
Party	Candidate	Votes	%
Independent	William Tait	166	64.1%
Independent	Prophet Smith (Incumbent)	93	35.9%
Majority		73	28.2%
Independent hold			

Dunrossness South
Party	Candidate	Votes	%
Independent	Raymond Bentley	unopposed	unopposed
Majority		unopposed	unopposed
Independent hold			

Gulberwick, Quarff and Cunningsburgh
Party	Candidate	Votes	%
Independent	Joan McLeod (Incumbent)	unopposed	unopposed
Majority		unopposed	unopposed
Independent hold			

Lerwick Breiwick
Party	Candidate	Votes	%
Labour	John Butler (Incumbent)	194	53.4%
Independent	Harry Gray	169	46.6%
Majority		25	7.8%
Labour hold			

Lerwick Central
Party	Candidate	Votes	%
Labour	Bill Smith (Incumbent)	273	78.9%
Independent	James Wiseman	73	21.1%
Majority		200	57.8%
Labour gain from Independent			

Lerwick Clickimin
Party	Candidate	Votes	%
Independent	Ian Byrne (Incumbent)	unopposed	unopposed
Majority		unopposed	unopposed
Independent hold			

Lerwick Harbour
Party	Candidate	Votes	%
Independent	Edward Thomason (Incumbent)	241	81.4%
Independent	William Christie	55	18.6%
Majority		186	62.8%
Independent hold			

Lerwick North
Party	Candidate	Votes	%
Labour	Alex Morrison (Incumbent)	unopposed	unopposed
Majority		unopposed	unopposed
Labour hold			

Lerwick Sound
Party	Candidate	Votes	%
Independent	Lindsay Smith	141	38.0%
Independent	Robert Brandie	98	26.4%
Independent	James Gair	61	16.4%
Independent	Donald Briers	38	10.2%
Independent	Donald Sutherland	33	8.9%
Majority		43	11.6%
Independent hold			

Lerwick Twageos
Party	Candidate	Votes	%
Independent	Sandy Cluness	289	64.8%
Labour	James Paton (Incumbent)	157	35.2%
Majority		132	29.6%
Independent gain from Labour			

Nesting and Lunnasting
Party	Candidate	Votes	%
Independent	Peter Hunter	unopposed	unopposed
Majority		unopposed	unopposed
Independent hold			

Northmavine
Party	Candidate	Votes	%
Labour	Chris Dowle	317	80.3%
Independent	John Jamieson (Incumbent)	78	19.7%
Majority		239	50.7%
Labour gain from Independent			

Sandness and Walls
Party	Candidate	Votes	%
Independent	Gordon Walterson	228	57.4%
Independent	Williamina Tait (Incumbent)	169	42.6%
Majority		59	14.8%
Independent hold			

Sandwick
Party	Candidate	Votes	%
Independent	Peter Watts	163	56.6%
Independent	T.M.Y. Manson	125	43.4%
Majority		59	13.2%
Independent hold			

Scalloway
Party	Candidate	Votes	%
Independent	Jemima Walterson	263	63.4%
Independent	Andrew Irvine (Incumbent)	123	29.6%
Independent	James Watt	29	7.0%
Majority		140	33.8%
Independent hold			

Unst
Party	Candidate	Votes	%
Independent	William Playfair	181	50.7%
Independent	Alan Fraser (Incumbent)	176	49.3%
Majority		5	1.4%
Independent hold			

Whalsay and Skerries
Party	Candidate	Votes	%
Independent	Henry Stewart	unopposed	unopposed
Majority		unopposed	unopposed
Independent hold			

Whiteness, Weisdale and Tingwall
Party	Candidate	Votes	%
Independent	Florence Grains	169	40.2%
Independent	Alexander Arthur	154	36.7%
Independent	John Rae	97	23.1%
Majority		15	3.5%
Independent hold			

Yell North and Fetlar
Party	Candidate	Votes	%
Independent	David Johnson (Incumbent)	unopposed	unopposed
Majority		unopposed	unopposed
Independent hold			

Yell South
Party	Candidate	Votes	%
Independent	Stewart Gray (Incumbent)	146	50.2%
Independent	Frank Odie	145	49.8%
Majority		1	0.4%
Independent hold			

== By-elections since 1978 ==
1980 Lerwick North by-election
Party	Candidate	Votes	%
Ratepayers	Robert Tulloch	261	71.9%
Independent	John Groat	75	20.7%
Independent	James Wiseman	27	7.4%
Majority		186	51.2%
Ratepayers gain from Independent			

The 1981 Burra and Trondra by-election was triggered by the resignation of Arthur Williamson. It was won by former councillor William Cumming, a member of the pro-autonomy Shetland Movement, as an independent candidate.

1981 Burra and Trondra by-election
Party	Candidate	Votes	%
Independent	William Cumming	306	68.3%
Ratepayers	Tom Stove	133	29.7%
Independent	James Wiseman	9	2.0%
Majority		178	38.6%
Independent hold			
