= 1982 Scottish regional elections =

- 6 May 1982
- Registered: 3,828,322
- Turnout: 42.9%
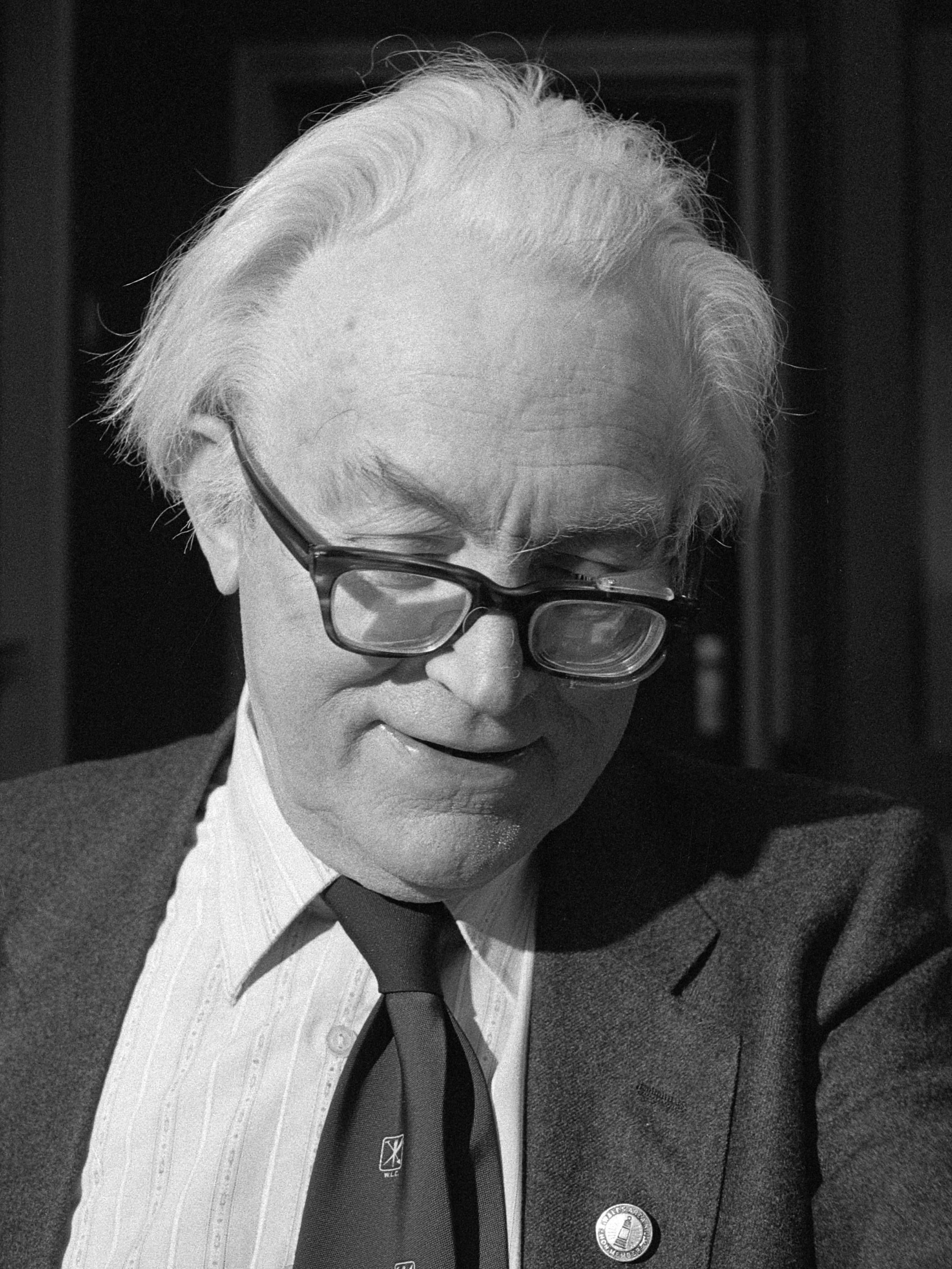

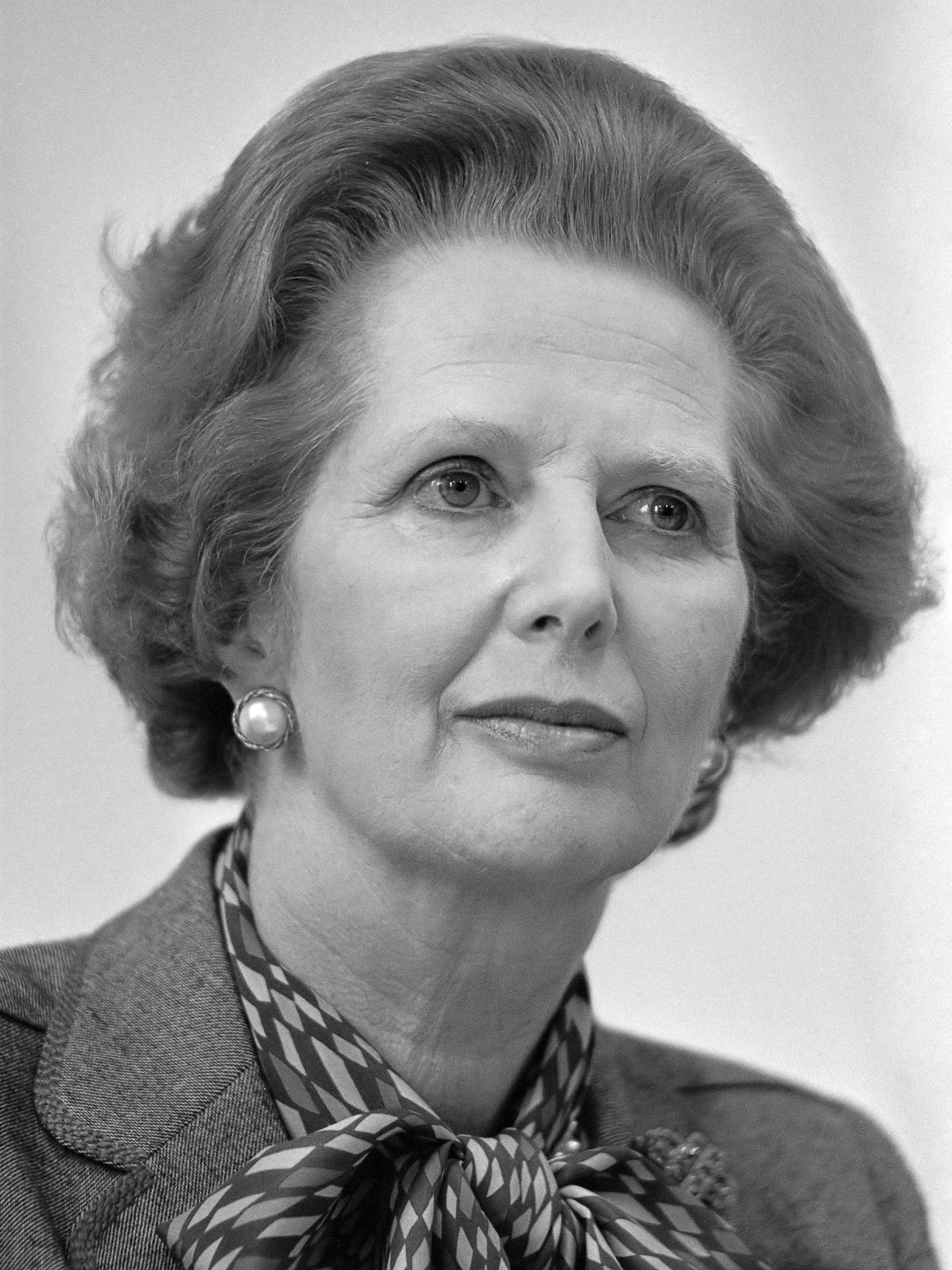

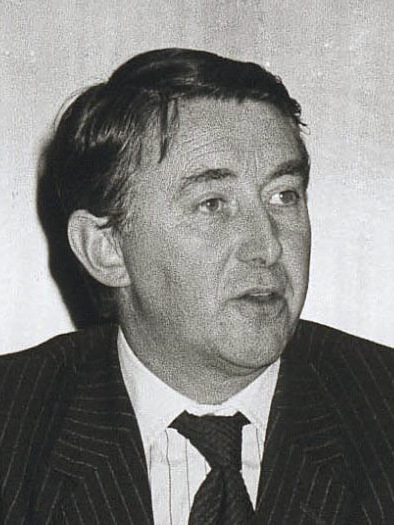

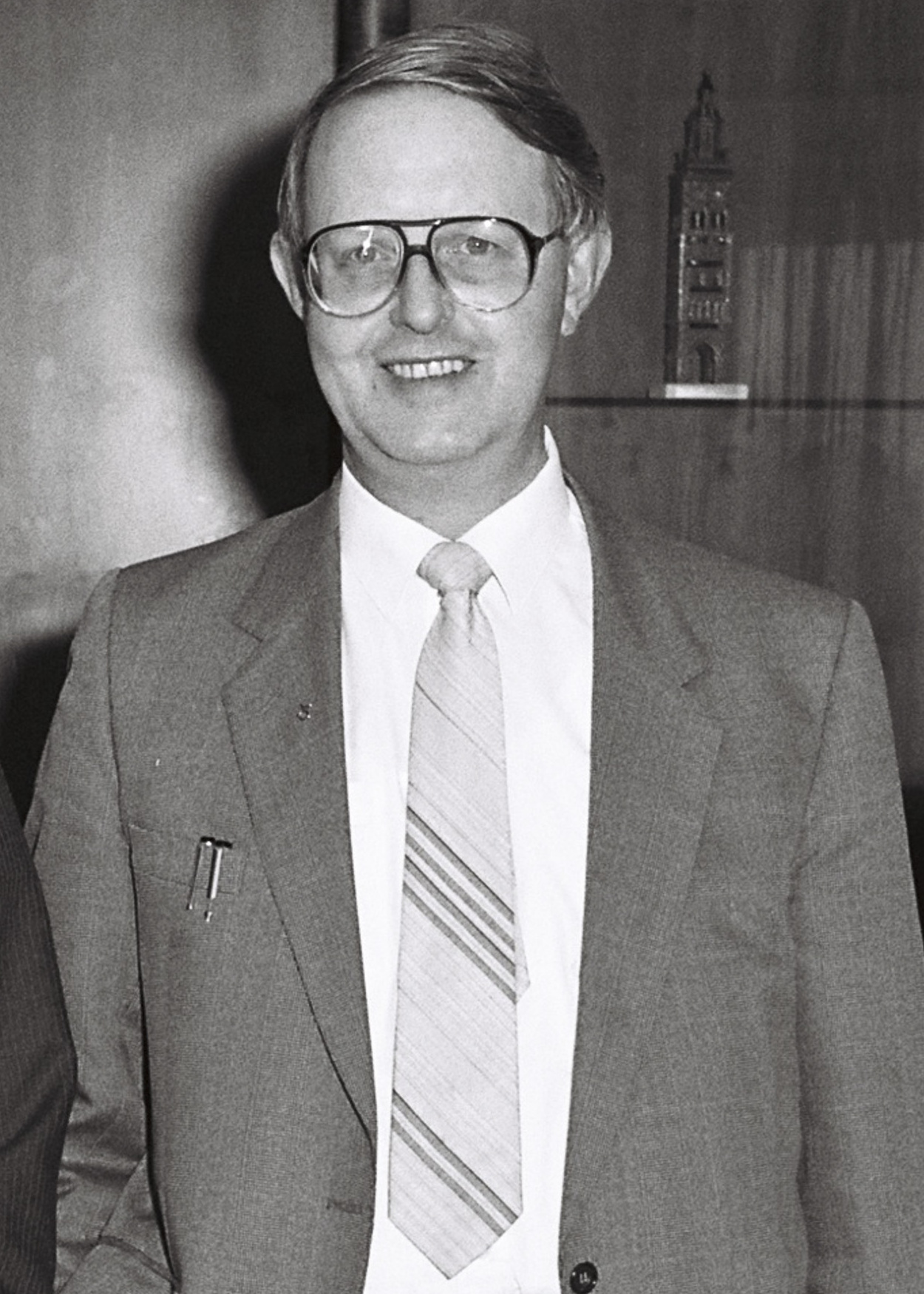
	First party	Second party
Leader	Michael Foot	Margaret Thatcher
Party	Labour	Conservative
Leader since	10 November 1980	11 February 1975
Seats won	186	119
Seat change	▲10	▼17
Popular vote	572,776	382,891
Percentage	37.6%	25.1%
Swing	▼2.0%	▼5.2%
	Third party	Fourth party
Leader	David Steel	Gordon Wilson
Party	Alliance	SNP
Leader since	7 July 1976	15 September 1979
Seats won	25	23
Seat change	▲19	▲5
Popular vote	276,824	204,774
Percentage	18.1%	13.4%
Swing	▲15.8%	▼7.5%
- Colours denote the winning party with outright control

- Results by ward

Regional elections were held in Scotland on Thursday 6 May 1982, as part of the wider 1982 United Kingdom local elections. Whilst the 1982 elections saw the Conservatives hold up relatively well in England, the Tories did comparatively poorly in Scotland, where their already disadvantageous position worsened. The Conservatives did particularly poorly in Strathclyde, where the Conservative group leader lost his seat.

Despite this poor performance, the Conservatives were actually seen as doing somewhat well in the overall Scottish context; the Conservative vote had, prior to the election, been languishing around 18% in Scotland. This was somewhat credited to a modest "Falkland Effect;" a surge in Conservative support due to their handling of the ongoing Falklands War.

The SDP-Liberal Alliance managed to displace the SNP into fourth place, although this increase in support ultimately did not translate into major seat gains due to the FPTP nature of the ward electoral system.

Also notable was the success of candidates in Shetland supportive of Home Rule for the islands, who wished for something similar to that enjoyed by the Faroe Islands. Whilst no candidates appeared on the ballot as members of the Shetland Movement, the Shetland Movement did publish a list of candidates supportive of Shetland Home Rule. Ultimately, of the 25 members of the Shetland Islands Council, 14 were supporters of the movement.

== National results ==
Summary of the 1982 Scottish regional council election results
Parties	Votes	Votes %	Wards
Labour	572,776	37.6	186
Conservative	382,891	25.1	119
Alliance	276,824	18.1	25
SNP	204,774	13.4	23
Communist	5,537	0.4	1
Protestant Crusade Against the Papal Visit	1,228	0.1	0
Ecology	997	0.1	0
Independent Labour	402	0.03	0
Democratic Socialist Party	264	0.2	0
Workers Revolutionary	252	0.02	0
Twentieth Century Reformation Movement	136	0.01	0
Ratepayer	30	0.002	0
Independent	77,626	5.1	87
Total	1,446,111	100.0	441

== Results by council area ==
Council	Labour	Conservative	SNP	SDP-Liberal Alliance	Independent	Other	Turnout	Control	Details
Borders‡	0	8	0	3	12	0	41.1%	Independent hold	Details
Central‡	22	4	5	1	2	0	44.7%	Labour hold	Details
Dumfries and Galloway‡	4	4	3	2	22	0	39.0%	Independent hold	Details
Fife‡	27	10	1	4	2	1	43.2%	Labour hold	Details
Grampian‡	15	28	3	6	2	0	34.3%	Conservative Hold	Details
Highland‡	5	1	2	2	42	0	41.0%	Independent Hold	Details
Lothian‡	22	22	1	3	1	0	47.6%	No overall control Gain from Labour	Details
Orkney‡								Independent Hold	Details
Shetland‡	1	0	0	0	10	14		Independent Hold	Details
Strathclyde‡	79	15	3	4	2	0	42.4%	Labour Hold	Details
Tayside‡	12	27	5	0	2	0	45.3%	Conservative Hold	Details
Na h-Eileanan Siar (Western Isles)‡								Independent Hold	Details
