= 1999 Orkney Islands Council election =

1999 local election in Scotland

← 1994	6 May 1999	2003 →

All 21 seats to Orkney Islands Council 11 seats needed for a majority
	First party
Leader	Hugh Halcro-Johnston
Party	Independent
Leader's seat	Scapa and Kirkwall South West
Last election	21 seats, 100.0%
Seats before	21
Seats won	21
Seat change	0
Popular vote	5,892
Percentage	100.0%
Swing	0.0%
Council Convener before election
Hugh Halcro-Johnston
Independent
Council Convener after election
Hugh Halcro-Johnston
Independent

Elections to the Orkney Islands Council were held on 6 May 1999 as part of Scottish local elections. Only independent candidates contested the election. Eight seats were uncontested.

== Election results ==
Orkney Islands Council election, 1999
Party	Seats	Gains	Losses	Net gain/loss	Seats %	Votes %	Votes	+/−
Independent	21	0	0	0	100.0	100.0	5,892	0.0

== Ward results ==
Berstane & Work
Party	Candidate	Votes	%
Independent	Mike Drever	234	46.3%
Independent	Alasdair Thom (Incumbent)	153	30.3%
Independent	R Gilbert	101	20.0%
Independent	Margaret Flaws	17	3.4%
Majority		81	16.0%
Independent hold			

Birsay & Dounby
Party	Candidate	Votes	%
Independent	K Johnson (incumbent)	unopposed	unopposed
Majority		unopposed	unopposed
Independent hold			

Brandyquoy
Party	Candidate	Votes	%
Independent	R Sclater	252	54.7%
Independent	Ian MacDonald (Incumbent)	209	45.3%
Majority		43	9.4%
Independent hold			

Evie, Rendall, Rousay, Egilsay & Wyre
Party	Candidate	Votes	%
Independent	Jimmy Moar (incumbent)	unopposed	unopposed
Majority		unopposed	unopposed
Independent hold			

Firth & Sunnybrae
Party	Candidate	Votes	%
Independent	Eoin Scott (Incumbent)	317	67.3%
Independent	R. Sabiston	154	32.7%
Majority		163	34.6%
Independent hold			

Harray & Stenness
Party	Candidate	Votes	%
Independent	J. Hamilton	239	54.1%
Independent	M. Bichan (Incumbent)	203	45.9%
Majority		36	8.2%
Independent hold			

Holm & Burray
Party	Candidate	Votes	%
Independent	M. Petrie	unopposed	unopposed
Majority		unopposed	unopposed
Independent hold			

Lynnfield
Party	Candidate	Votes	%
Independent	B. Taylor	182	38.4%
Independent	I. Clyde (Incumbent)	153	32.3%
Independent	M. O'Keeffe-Burgher	139	29.3%
Majority		29	6.1%
Independent hold			

Orphir, Walls & Flotta
Party	Candidate	Votes	%
Independent	K. Sutherland (Incumbent)	371	73.6%
Independent	T. Thomson	133	26.4%
Majority		238	45.2%
Independent hold			

Papa Westray, Westray & Eday
Party	Candidate	Votes	%
Independent	Stephen Hagan (Incumbent)	unopposed	unopposed
Majority		unopposed	unopposed
Independent hold			

Papdale
Party	Candidate	Votes	%
Independent	Janice Annal (Incumbent)	219	60.0%
Independent	R. Gibson	98	26.8%
Independent	B. Johnstone	26	7.1%
Independent	W. Vevers	22	6.0%
Majority		121	33.2%
Independent hold			

Pickaquoy
Party	Candidate	Votes	%
Independent	J. Moodie	192	48.1%
Independent	Allan Leslie	98	40.9%
Independent	L. Groundwater (Incumbent)	44	11.0%
Majority		29	7.2%
Independent hold			

Sanday, North Ronaldsay & Stronsay
Party	Candidate	Votes	%
Independent	S. Scott	243	56.8%
Independent	George Stevenson (Incumbent)	185	43.2%
Majority		58	15.6%
Independent hold			

Sandwick & Stromness Landward
Party	Candidate	Votes	%
Independent	Freddie Groundwater (Incumbent)	274	64.5%
Independent	R. Foubister	151	35.5%
Majority		123	19.0%
Independent hold			

Scapa & Kirkwall South West
Party	Candidate	Votes	%
Independent	Hugh Halcro-Johnston (Incumbent)	unopposed	unopposed
Majority		unopposed	unopposed
Independent hold			

Shapinsay & Kirkwall Harbour
Party	Candidate	Votes	%
Independent	J. Sinclair (Incumbent)	357	76.8%
Independent	J. Finnie	108	23.2%
Majority		249	53.6%
Independent hold			

South Ronaldsay
Party	Candidate	Votes	%
Independent	C. Annal (Incumbent)	unopposed	unopposed
Majority		unopposed	unopposed
Independent hold			

St Andrews, Deerness & Wideford
Party	Candidate	Votes	%
Independent	Jim Foubister (Incumbent)	unopposed	unopposed
Majority		unopposed	unopposed
Independent hold			

Stromness North
Party	Candidate	Votes	%
Independent	J. Brown (Incumbent)	244	55.2%
Independent	R. Ward	198	44.8%
Majority		46	10.4%
Independent hold			

Stromness South, Graemsay & North Hoy
Party	Candidate	Votes	%
Independent	B. Murray (Incumbent)	unopposed	unopposed
Majority		unopposed	unopposed
Independent hold			

Warrenfield
Party	Candidate	Votes	%
Independent	Roderick McLeod	221	52.5%
Independent	N. Craigie (Incumbent)	200	47.5%
Majority		21	5.0%
Independent hold			
