= Masurian Autonomy Movement =

Masurian Autonomy Movement Ruch Autonomii Mazur
- Abbreviation: RAM
- Leader: Zbigniew Paliński
- Founded: September 2, 2011
- Headquarters: Mrągowo, Plac Michała Kajki 2/8
- Membership (2011): 50
- Ideology: Masurian autonomism

Website
- http://rammragowo.manifo.com

The Masurian Autonomy Movement (Polish: Ruch Autonomii Mazur) is a political party in the Masuria region of Poland advocating for the region's self-sufficiency, Autonomy, and deepening of the Masurian identity. The party works closely with the Silesian Autonomy Movement.

== History ==
The movement was founded by Zbigniew Paliński in Mrągowo in 2011. The Movement takes inspiration from the Silesian Autonomy Movement.
