= 1974 Orkney Islands Council election =

Scottish local election

7 May 1974	1978 →

All 23 seats to Orkney Islands Council 12 seats needed for a majority
	First party
Leader	George Marwick
Party	Independent
Leader's seat	Birsay
Seats won	23
Popular vote	4,818
Percentage	100.0%
Council Convener after election
George Marwick
Independent

The 1974 Orkney Islands Council election, the first election to Orkney Islands Council, was held on 7 May 1974 as part of the wider 1974 Scottish regional elections. Only independent candidates contested the election and eight seats were uncontested.

The newly elected Orkney Islands Council existed as a shadow authority until 1975, when it inherited sole authority for local government in Orkney from the Orkney County Council, Kirkwall Town Council and Stromness Town Council.

== Results ==
1974 Orkney Islands election
Party	Seats	Gains	Losses	Net gain/loss	Seats %	Votes %	Votes	+/−
Independent	23	N/A	N/A	N/A	100.0	100.0%	4,818	N/A

== Ward results ==
St Magnus
Party	Candidate	Votes	%
Independent	O. Work	145	35.5%
Independent	T. Taylor	101	24.8%
Independent	J. McRae	87	21.3%
Independent	W. Sinclair	75	18.4%
Majority		44	10.7%
Independent hold			

Papdale
Party	Candidate	Votes	%
Independent	William Groundwater	119	44.6%
Independent	Ruby Leslie	73	27.3%
Independent	M. Heddle	44	16.5%
Independent	A. Rorie	31	11.6%
Majority		46	17.3%
Independent hold			

Broadsands
Party	Candidate	Votes	%
Independent	Edwin Eunson	199	53.4%
Independent	L. Stiff	98	26.3%
Independent	P. Gorie	76	20.4%
Majority		101	27.1%
Independent hold			

St Olaf's
Party	Candidate	Votes	%
Independent	Sybil Roebuck	177	52.8%
Independent	Georgina Leitch	158	47.2%
Majority		19	5.6%
Independent hold			

Quoybanks
Party	Candidate	Votes	%
Independent	R. Hancock	152	45.2%
Independent	W. Muir	98	29.2%
Independent	I. Smith	59	17.6%
Independent	J. Hay	27	8.0%
Majority		54	16.0%
Independent hold			

Stromness South
Party	Candidate	Votes	%
Independent	William Knight	unopposed	unopposed
Majority		unopposed	unopposed
Independent hold			

Stromness North
Party	Candidate	Votes	%
Independent	Brenda Robertson	250	76.0%
Independent	J. Bannerman	79	24.0%
Majority		171	52.0%
Independent hold			

St. Ola
Party	Candidate	Votes	%
Independent	J. Scott	243	76.0%
Independent	P. Konstan	73	23.1%
Majority		170	52.9%
Independent hold			

Harray & Firth
Party	Candidate	Votes	%
Independent	Laura Grimond	309	61.8%
Independent	J. Firth	191	38.2%
Majority		181	13.6%
Independent hold			

Stenness & Orphir
Party	Candidate	Votes	%
Independent	R. Macrae	unopposed	unopposed
Majority		unopposed	unopposed
Independent hold			

Sandwick
Party	Candidate	Votes	%
Independent	W. Firth	unopposed	unopposed
Majority		unopposed	unopposed
Independent hold			

St Andrews & Deerness
Party	Candidate	Votes	%
Independent	Jackie Tait	174	55.8%
Independent	R. Bain	130	44.2%
Majority		34	11.6%
Independent hold			

Birsay
Party	Candidate	Votes	%
Independent	George Marwick	unopposed	unopposed
Majority		unopposed	unopposed
Independent hold			

Evie & Rendall
Party	Candidate	Votes	%
Independent	George Stevenson	unopposed	unopposed
Majority		unopposed	unopposed
Independent hold			

Stromness
Party	Candidate	Votes	%
Independent	John Chalmers	78	47.0%
Independent	D. Ritch	38	22.9%
Independent	J.R.T. Robertson	21	12.7%
Independent	W. Kirkpatrick	19	11.5%
Independent	J. Thomson	10	6.0%
Majority		40	24.1%
Independent hold			

Holm
Party	Candidate	Votes	%
Independent	J. Laughton	unopposed	unopposed
Majority		unopposed	unopposed
Independent hold			

Burray & South Ronaldsay
Party	Candidate	Votes	%
Independent	Alex Annal	279	71.4%
Independent	L. Park	112	28.6%
Majority		167	42.8%
Independent hold			

Hoy & Flotta
Party	Candidate	Votes	%
Independent	Ewen Traill	172	55.5%
Independent	John Groat	109	35.2%
Independent	C. Mackenzie	29	9.4%
Majority		63	20.3%
Independent hold			

North Ronaldsay & Sanday
Party	Candidate	Votes	%
Independent	Christine Muir	269	71.9%
Independent	D. Sinclair	105	28.1%
Majority		164	43.8%
Independent hold			

Holm
Party	Candidate	Votes	%
Independent	J. Scott	unopposed	unopposed
Majority		unopposed	unopposed
Independent hold			

Eday & Stronsay
Party	Candidate	Votes	%
Independent	J. Groat	134	53.6%
Independent	Mavis Bennett	116	46.4%
Majority		18	7.2%
Independent hold			

Rousay
Party	Candidate	Votes	%
Independent	N. Firth	117	69.2%
Independent	G. Scott-Moncrieff	52	30.8%
Majority		65	38.4%
Independent hold			

Shapinsay
Party	Candidate	Votes	%
Independent	Tadeusz Zawadski	unopposed	unopposed
Majority		unopposed	unopposed
Independent hold			
