= Wir Shetland =

Political pressure group in Shetland

Wir Shetland was a short-lived pressure group that demanded greater autonomy for Shetland, an archipelago of Scotland.

It was launched in October 2015, and campaigned for British Crown Dependency status for Shetland, which would separate it from Scotland. It compared itself to the Shetland Movement active in the 1980s and 1990s.

It backed Tavish Scott, the Liberal Democrat MSP for Shetland, in the 2016 Scottish Parliament election, causing resignations from the group. The group became inactive soon after the election.
