= 1978 Orkney Islands Council election =

Scottish local election

← 1974	2 May 1978	1982 →

All 24 seats to Orkney Islands Council 13 seats needed for a majority
	First party
Leader	George Marwick
Party	Independent
Leader's seat	Birsay (defeated)
Last election	24
Seats won	24
Seat change	▲1
Popular vote	4,458
Percentage	100.0%
Swing	0.0%
Council Convener before election
George Marwick
Independent
Council Convener after election
Edwin Eunson
Independent

The 1978 Orkney Islands Council election, the second election to Orkney Islands Council, was held on 2 May 1978 as part of the wider 1978 Scottish regional elections. Only independent candidates contested the election and ten seats were uncontested.

== Results ==
1978 Orkney Islands election
Party	Seats	Gains	Losses	Net gain/loss	Seats %	Votes %	Votes	+/−
Independent	24	1	0	▲1	100.0	100.0	4,458	0.0

== Ward results ==
Kirkwall St Magnus
Party	Candidate	Votes	%
Independent	J. MacRae (Incumbent)	unopposed	unopposed
Majority		unopposed	unopposed
Independent hold			

Kirkwall Weyland
Party	Candidate	Votes	%
Independent	James Melrose	170	70.2%
Independent	James Hine	47	19.4%
Independent	L. Mowat	24	9.9%
Majority		123	50.8%
Independent hold			

Broadsands
Party	Candidate	Votes	%
Independent	Edwin Eunson (Incumbent)	unopposed	unopposed
Majority		unopposed	unopposed
Independent hold			

St Olaf's
Party	Candidate	Votes	%
Independent	J. Marwick	unopposed	unopposed
Majority		unopposed	unopposed
Independent hold			

Quoybanks
Party	Candidate	Votes	%
Independent	A. Stranger	138	63.3%
Independent	E. Rose	50	22.9%
Independent	F. Mearo	30	13.8%
Majority		88	40.4%
Independent hold			

Papdale
Party	Candidate	Votes	%
Independent	Allan Taylor	162	87.6%
Independent	Alma Fotheringhame	22	11.9%
Majority		140	75.7%
Independent hold			

Stromness West
Party	Candidate	Votes	%
Independent	Ronald Miller	157	54.3%
Independent	William Knight (Incumbent)	132	45.7%
Majority		25	8.6%
Independent hold			

Stromness Central
Party	Candidate	Votes	%
Independent	Brenda Robertson (Incumbent)	unopposed	unopposed
Majority		unopposed	unopposed
Independent hold			

Stromness North
Party	Candidate	Votes	%
Independent	John Chalmers (Incumbent)	unopposed	unopposed
Majority		unopposed	unopposed
Independent hold			

St Ola
Party	Candidate	Votes	%
Independent	E. Harcus	unopposed	unopposed
Majority		unopposed	unopposed
Independent hold			

Firth & Harray
Party	Candidate	Votes	%
Independent	Laura Grimond (Incumbent)	278	64.6%
Independent	Frank Tait	152	35.4%
Majority		126	29.2%
Independent hold			

Stenness & Orphir
Party	Candidate	Votes	%
Independent	William Anderson	202	52.2%
Independent	Susan Flint	184	47.5%
Majority		18	4.7%
Independent hold			

Sandwick
Party	Candidate	Votes	%
Independent	J.R.T. Robertson	151	58.5%
Independent	W. Firth (Incumbent)	107	41.5%
Majority		44	17.0%
Independent hold			

St Andrews & Deerness
Party	Candidate	Votes	%
Independent	Jackie Tait (Incumbent)	unopposed	unopposed
Majority		unopposed	unopposed
Independent hold			

Birsay
Party	Candidate	Votes	%
Independent	John Brown	179	52.8%
Independent	George Marwick (Incumbent)	160	47.2%
Majority		19	4.6%
Independent hold			

Evie & Rendall
Party	Candidate	Votes	%
Independent	George Stevenson (Incumbent)	153	54.4%
Independent	William Brough	78	27.8%
Independent	Alastair Marwick	49	17.4%
Majority		75	25.6%
Independent hold			

Holm
Party	Candidate	Votes	%
Independent	Alastair Scholes (Incumbent)	196	80.3%
Independent	R. Robertson	48	19.7%
Majority		148	60.6%
Independent hold			

South Ronaldsay & Burray
Party	Candidate	Votes	%
Independent	Alex Annal (Incumbent)	311	52.6%
Independent	Marcus Wood	279	47.2%
Majority		32	5.4%
Independent hold			

Hoy
Party	Candidate	Votes	%
Independent	Ewen Traill (Incumbent)	166	43.9%
Independent	John Groat	107	28.3%
Independent	William Sutherland	104	27.5%
Majority		59	15.6%
Independent hold			

North Ronaldsay & Sanday
Party	Candidate	Votes	%
Independent	J. Powrie (Incumbent)	221	65.6%
Independent	T. Tulloch	113	33.5%
Majority		108	32.1%
Independent hold			

Westray & Papa Westray
Party	Candidate	Votes	%
Independent	J. Scott (Incumbent)	unopposed	unopposed
Majority		unopposed	unopposed
Independent hold			

Stronsay & Eday
Party	Candidate	Votes	%
Independent	G. Groat (Incumbent)	160	55.0%
Independent	Ethel Popplewell	128	44.0%
Majority		32	11.0%
Independent hold			

Rousay
Party	Candidate	Votes	%
Independent	N. Firth (Incumbent)	unopposed	unopposed
Majority		unopposed	unopposed
Independent hold			

Shapinsay
Party	Candidate	Votes	%
Independent	C. Zawadski (Incumbent)	unopposed	unopposed
Majority		unopposed	unopposed
Independent hold			
