= Wessex Constitutional Convention =

Pressure group in UK

The Wessex Constitutional Convention is an all-party pressure group, in the United Kingdom, devoted to pursuing a degree of self-government for Wessex. It has the following stated aims:

1. To achieve the broadest consensus on the form of self-government appropriate for Wessex.
2. To campaign for the implementation of that consensus at the earliest possible opportunity.
3. To oppose the continuing partition of Wessex between the 'South-West' and 'South-East' regions.
4. To promote as Wessex the area comprising the eight traditional counties of Berkshire, Devon, Dorset, Hampshire, Oxfordshire, Gloucestershire, Somerset and Wiltshire, subject to addition or subtraction according to popular wish.

The Convention was formed in Exeter, on 19 May 2001, in response to the perceived failure of the South West Constitutional Convention, meeting earlier that day, to allow genuine dialogue on the issue of regional boundaries. From then until the start of 2005 it published a quarterly newsletter, Wessex Voice, and led the production of The Case for Wessex, the joint response of the Wessex movement to the regional governance White Paper, Your Region, Your Choice.

From 2003-2005, the Convention actively participated in the Continuing Commission on the South, set up by the political think-tank "Devolve!" and chaired by former regions minister Dr. Alan Whitehead, MP. More recently, it has again taken an independent line in presenting evidence to the House of Commons ODPM Select Committee and the Examination in Public into the draft Regional Spatial Strategy for the South West.

In 2007 the organisation called for Prince Edward, Earl of Wessex to support a proposal to change the name of the Second Severn Crossing to the "Earl of Wessex Bridge".

== See also ==
- Cornish Constitutional Convention
- Wessex Regionalist Party
