= Plaid Glyndŵr =

- Leader: Dennis Morris
- Founded: 12 November 2012
- Headquarters: Wrexham, Wales
- Ideology: Welsh nationalism Welsh independence Welsh republicanism

Plaid Glyndŵr was first registered with the Electoral Commission as a minor political party on 12 November 2012. It is a Welsh nationalist and republican party that was based in Wrexham, Clwyd, Wales. Its leader was Dennis Morris. It aimed to contest local and the Welsh Assembly Elections in 2016.

The objectives of the party were:

- Welsh independence outside of the European Union.
- Oppose everything that suggests the destruction of Welsh identity.
- The right for Wales to control its own natural resources.
- Running in local, town and county elections.

In 2014 Morris launched a campaign to stop the Union Flag being flown more prominently than the Welsh flag on public buildings, particularly the Town Hall in Fishguard, Pembrokeshire.

In 2015 Plaid Glyndŵr launched an online petition to stop people from outside Wales being given social housing before local people.
