= 1990 Orkney Islands Council election =

Fifth election to Orkney Islands Council

- May 3, 1990

All 24 seats to Orkney Islands Council 13 seats needed for a majority
	First party	Second party
Leader	Edwin Eunson	Spencer Rosie
Party	Independents	Orkney Movement
Leader's seat	Kirkwall Broadsands	Kirkwall Weyland
Last election	23	1
Seats won	23	1
Seat change	Steady	Steady
Popular vote	5,791	31
Percentage	97.6%	0.5%
Swing	▲5.4pp	▼5.7pp
- The result of the election
Council Convener before election
Edwin Eunson
Independent
Council Convener after election
Jackie Tait
Independent

The 1990 Orkney Islands Council election, the fifth election to Orkney Islands Council, was held on 3 May 1990 as part of the wider 1990 Scottish regional elections. The election saw the Independents take all save one of the seats on the council, securing them an overall majority.

== Results ==
1990 Orkney Islands election
Party	Seats	Gains	Losses	Net gain/loss	Seats %	Votes %	Votes	+/−
Independent	23	0	0	0		97.6	5,791	▲5.4
Orkney Movement	1	0	0	0		0.5	31	▼5.7
Green	0	0	0	0	0.0	1.8	109	New

== Ward results ==
Kirkwall St Magnus
Party	Candidate	Votes	%
Independent	Ian MacDonald (Incumbent)	318	82.4%
Independent	A. Wylie	68	17.6%
Majority		250	64.8%
Independent hold			

Kirkwall Weyland
Party	Candidate	Votes	%
Orkney Movement	Spencer Rosie (Incumbent)	unopposed	unopposed
Majority		unopposed	unopposed
Orkney Movement hold			

Kirkwall Broadsands
Party	Candidate	Votes	%
Independent	J. MacDonald	161	42.4%
Independent	Alasdair Thom	124	33.1%
Independent	J. McRae	89	23.7%
Majority		37	9.8%
Independent hold			

Kirkwall St Olaf's
Party	Candidate	Votes	%
Independent	A. Croy	229	59.3%
Independent	J. Marwick (Incumbent)	157	40.7%
Majority		72	18.6%
Independent hold			

Kirkwall Quoybanks
Party	Candidate	Votes	%
Independent	Jack Ridgway (Incumbent)	264	68.8%
Independent	D. Craigie	120	31.3%
Majority		144	39.6%
Independent hold			

Kirkwall Papdale
Party	Candidate	Votes	%
Independent	T. Taylor (Incumbent)	192	63.8%
Green	L. Cheer	109	36.2%
Majority		144	27.6%
Independent hold			

Stromness South
Party	Candidate	Votes	%
Independent	F. Matheson	168	53.5%
Independent	Ian Argo (Incumbent)	146	46.5%
Majority		144	7.0%
Independent hold			

Stromness Central
Party	Candidate	Votes	%
Independent	Brenda Robertson (Incumbent)	unopposed	unopposed
Majority		unopposed	unopposed
Independent hold			

Stromness North
Party	Candidate	Votes	%
Independent	M. Crichton (Incumbent)	unopposed	unopposed
Majority		unopposed	unopposed
Independent hold			

St Ola
Party	Candidate	Votes	%
Independent	I. Clyde	202	43.7%
Independent	A. Peace	129	27.9%
Independent	J. McDonald	85	18.4%
Independent	A. Walls	46	10.0%
Majority		73	15.8%
Independent hold			

Firth & Harray
Party	Candidate	Votes	%
Independent	K. Hutchison	255	44.0%
Independent	R. Sabiston	179	30.9%
Independent	Eoin Scott (Incumbent)	146	25.2%
Majority		76	13.1%
Independent hold			

Orphir & Stenness
Party	Candidate	Votes	%
Independent	Hugh Halcro-Johnston (Incumbent)	191	47.0%
Independent	R. Crichton	188	46.3%
Independent	K. Bews	26	6.4%
Majority		3	0.7%
Independent hold			

Sandwick
Party	Candidate	Votes	%
Independent	George Wylie (Incumbent)	unopposed	unopposed
Majority		unopposed	unopposed
Independent hold			

St Andrews & Deerness
Party	Candidate	Votes	%
Independent	Jackie Tait (Incumbent)	194	56.7%
Independent	J. Foubister	146	42.7%
Majority		48	14.0%
Independent hold			

Birsay
Party	Candidate	Votes	%
Independent	John Brown (Incumbent)	unopposed	unopposed
Majority		unopposed	unopposed
Independent hold			

Evie & Rendall
Party	Candidate	Votes	%
Independent	Jimmy Moar	162	57.4%
Independent	George Stevenson (Incumbent)	116	41.1%
Majority		46	16.3%
Independent hold			

Holm
Party	Candidate	Votes	%
Independent	Alastair Scholes (Incumbent)	unopposed	unopposed
Majority		unopposed	unopposed
Independent hold			

Ronaldsay South & Burray
Party	Candidate	Votes	%
Independent	C. Annal	314	52.9%
Independent	Billy Dass (Incumbent)	278	46.8%
Majority		36	6.1%
Independent hold			

Hoy & Graemsay
Party	Candidate	Votes	%
Independent	M. Trickett (Incumbent)	188	53.3%
Independent	A. Reid	119	33.7%
Independent	T. Thomson	45	12.7%
Majority		69	19.6%
Independent hold			

Ronaldsay North & Sanday
Party	Candidate	Votes	%
Independent	Howie Firth	199	54.5%
Independent	J. Alexander	101	27.7%
Independent	E. Sinclair	64	17.5%
Majority		98	26.8%
Independent hold			

Westray & Papa Westray
Party	Candidate	Votes	%
Independent	J. Scott (Incumbent)	133	51.8%
Independent	J. Rendall	124	48.2%
Majority		9	3.6%
Independent hold			

Eday & Stronsay
Party	Candidate	Votes	%
Independent	R. Heard (Incumbent)	unopposed	unopposed
Majority		unopposed	unopposed
Independent hold			

Rousay & Egilsay
Party	Candidate	Votes	%
Independent	B. Mainland	66	42.0%
Independent	Chris Soames (Incumbent)	59	37.6%
Orkney Movement	Margaret Flaws	31	19.7%
Majority		7	4.4%
Independent hold			

Shapinsay
Party	Candidate	Votes	%
Independent	J. Sinclair (Incumbent)	unopposed	unopposed
Majority		unopposed	unopposed
Independent hold			
