= 1986 Orkney Islands Council election =

1986 local election in Scotland

- 4 May 1986

All 24 seats to Orkney Islands Council 13 seats needed for a majority
| | First party | Second party |
|---|---|---|
| Leader | Edwin Eunson | Spencer Rosie |
| Party | Independents | Orkney Movement |
| Leader's seat | Kirkwall Broadsands | Kirkwall Weyland |
| Last election | 23 | 1 |
| Seats won | 23 | 1 |
| Seat change | Steady | Steady |
| Popular vote | 3,717 | 252 |
| Percentage | 92.2% | 6.2% |
| Swing | ▲5.7pp | ▲2.4pp |
Council Convener before election
Edwin Eunson
Independent
Council Convener after election
Edwin Eunson
Independent

The 1986 Orkney Islands Council election, the fifth election to Orkney Islands Council, was held on 4 May 1986 as part of the wider 1986 Scottish regional elections. The election saw the Independents take all save one of the seats on the council, securing them an overall majority.

== Results ==
1986 Orkney Islands Council election
| Party | Seats | Gains | Losses | Net gain/loss | Seats % | Votes % | Votes | +/− |
|---|---|---|---|---|---|---|---|---|
| Independent | 23 | 0 | 0 | Steady | | 92.2 | 3,717 | ▲5.7 |
| Orkney Movement | 1 | 0 | 0 | 0 | | 6.2 | 252 | ▲2.4 |
| Labour | 0 | 0 | 0 | 0 | 0.0 | 1.6 | 64 | ▼8.1 |

== Ward results ==
Kirkwall St Magnus
| Party | Candidate | Votes | % |
|---|---|---|---|
| Independent | J. MacDonald | 152 | 53.5% |
| Independent | J. McRae (Incumbent) | 132 | 46.5% |
| Majority | | 20 | 7.0% |
| Independent hold | | | |

Kirkwall St Magnus
| Party | Candidate | Votes | % |
|---|---|---|---|
| Orkney Movement | Spencer Rosie (Incumbent) | 196 | 55.2% |
| Independent | I. Clyde | 159 | 44.8% |
| Majority | | 37 | 10.4% |
| Orkney Movement hold | | | |

Kirkwall Broadsands
| Party | Candidate | Votes | % |
|---|---|---|---|
| Independent | Edwin Eunson (Incumbent) | unopposed | unopposed |
| Majority | | unopposed | unopposed |
| Independent hold | | | |

Kirkwall St Olaf's
| Party | Candidate | Votes | % |
|---|---|---|---|
| Independent | J. Marwick (Incumbent) | unopposed | unopposed |
| Majority | | unopposed | unopposed |
| Independent hold | | | |

Kirkwall St Quoybanks
| Party | Candidate | Votes | % |
|---|---|---|---|
| Independent | Jack Ridgway | 174 | 57.2% |
| Independent | L. Groundwater | 120 | 39.5% |
| Kirkwallian | K. Donaldson | 10 | 3.3% |
| Majority | | 54 | 17.7% |
| Independent hold | | | |

Kirkwall Papdale
| Party | Candidate | Votes | % |
|---|---|---|---|
| Independent | T. Taylor (Incumbent) | 164 | 55.8% |
| Independent | A. Rorie | 95 | 32.3% |
| Independent | A. Fotheringhame | 35 | 11.9% |
| Majority | | 69 | 23.5% |
| Independent hold | | | |

Stromness South
| Party | Candidate | Votes | % |
|---|---|---|---|
| Independent | Ian Argo (Incumbent) | 152 | 51.7% |
| Independent | J. Davidson | 75 | 25.5% |
| Labour | E. Brown | 64 | 21.8% |
| Majority | | 77 | 25.2% |
| Independent hold | | | |

Stromness Central
| Party | Candidate | Votes | % |
|---|---|---|---|
| Independent | Brenda Robertson (Incumbent) | unopposed | unopposed |
| Majority | | unopposed | unopposed |
| Independent hold | | | |

Stromness North
| Party | Candidate | Votes | % |
|---|---|---|---|
| Independent | M. Crichton (Incumbent) | unopposed | unopposed |
| Majority | | unopposed | unopposed |
| Independent hold | | | |

St Ola
| Party | Candidate | Votes | % |
|---|---|---|---|
| Independent | P. Wright | 281 | 62.3% |
| Independent | A. Peace | 131 | 29.0% |
| Orkney Movement | J. Kelly | 27 | 7.0% |
| Independent | E. Stockton | 12 | 2.7% |
| Majority | | 150 | 33.3% |
| Independent hold | | | |

Firth & Harray
| Party | Candidate | Votes | % |
|---|---|---|---|
| Independent | Eoin Scott (Incumbent) | 221 | 56.2% |
| Independent | R. Sabiston | 171 | 43.5% |
| Majority | | 50 | 12.7% |
| Independent hold | | | |

Orphir & Stenness
| Party | Candidate | Votes | % |
|---|---|---|---|
| Independent | Hugh Halcro-Johnston (Incumbent) | 207 | 49.3% |
| Independent | E. Spence | 94 | 22.4% |
| Independent | J. Flett | 90 | 21.4% |
| Orkney Movement | K. Bews | 29 | 6.9% |
| Majority | | 113 | 26.9% |
| Independent hold | | | |

Sandwick
| Party | Candidate | Votes | % |
|---|---|---|---|
| Independent | George Wylie | unopposed | unopposed |
| Majority | | unopposed | unopposed |
| Independent hold | | | |

St Andrews & Deerness
| Party | Candidate | Votes | % |
|---|---|---|---|
| Independent | Jackie Tait (Incumbent) | unopposed | unopposed |
| Majority | | unopposed | unopposed |
| Independent hold | | | |

Birsay
| Party | Candidate | Votes | % |
|---|---|---|---|
| Independent | John Brown (Incumbent) | unopposed | unopposed |
| Majority | | unopposed | unopposed |
| Independent hold | | | |

Evie & Rendall
| Party | Candidate | Votes | % |
|---|---|---|---|
| Independent | George Stevenson (Incumbent) | unopposed | unopposed |
| Majority | | unopposed | unopposed |
| Independent hold | | | |

Holm
| Party | Candidate | Votes | % |
|---|---|---|---|
| Independent | Alastair Scholes (Incumbent) | unopposed | unopposed |
| Majority | | unopposed | unopposed |
| Independent hold | | | |

Ronaldsay South & Burray
| Party | Candidate | Votes | % |
|---|---|---|---|
| Independent | Billy Dass (Incumbent) | 385 | 62.7% |
| Independent | Alex Annal | 226 | 36.8% |
| Majority | | 159 | 25.9% |
| Independent hold | | | |

Hoy & Graemsay
| Party | Candidate | Votes | % |
|---|---|---|---|
| Independent | M. Trickett | 148 | 43.4% |
| Independent | J. Groat | 119 | 34.9% |
| Independent | T. Thomson | 40 | 11.7% |
| Independent | C. Rioch (Incumbent) | 34 | 10.0% |
| Majority | | 29 | 8.5% |
| Independent hold | | | |

Ronaldsay North & Sanday
| Party | Candidate | Votes | % |
|---|---|---|---|
| Independent | S. Peace | unopposed | unopposed |
| Majority | | unopposed | unopposed |
| Independent hold | | | |

Westray & Papa Westray
| Party | Candidate | Votes | % |
|---|---|---|---|
| Independent | J. Scott (Incumbent) | unopposed | unopposed |
| Majority | | unopposed | unopposed |
| Independent hold | | | |

Eday & Stronsay
| Party | Candidate | Votes | % |
|---|---|---|---|
| Independent | J. Groat (Incumbent) | 236 | 81.4% |
| Independent | A. Stewart | 54 | 18.6% |
| Majority | | 182 | 62.8% |
| Independent hold | | | |

Rousay & Egilsay
| Party | Candidate | Votes | % |
|---|---|---|---|
| Independent | Chris Soames (Incumbent) | unopposed | unopposed |
| Majority | | unopposed | unopposed |
| Independent hold | | | |

Shapinsay
| Party | Candidate | Votes | % |
|---|---|---|---|
| Independent | J. Sinclair (Incumbent) | unopposed | unopposed |
| Majority | | unopposed | unopposed |
| Independent hold | | | |
