= 1990 Shetland Islands Council election =

Fifth election to Shetland Islands Council

- May 3, 1990

All 25 seats to Shetland Islands Council 13 seats needed for a majority
	First party	Second party	Third party
Leader		Edward Thomason	Bill Smith
Party	Independent	Shetland Movement	Labour
Leader's seat		Lerwick Harbour	Lerwick Central
Last election	16	5	5
Seats won	16	7	1
Seat change	0	▲2	▼3
Popular vote	1,962	1,083	246
Percentage	56.9%	31.4%	7.1%
Swing	▼10.0%	▲17.8%	▼9.5%
	Fourth party
Leader	Leonard Groat
Party	Independent Labour
Leader's seat	Lerwick North
Last election	0
Seats won	1
Seat change	▲1
Popular vote	0
Percentage	0.0 (Note: Candidate was elected unopposed)
Swing	New
- The result of the election
Council Convener before election
Edward Thomason
Shetland Movement
Council Convener after election
Edward Thomason
Shetland Movement

Results by electoral district.

An election to the Shetland Islands Council was held on 3 May 1990 as part of regional elections. Independents maintained control of the 25 seat council. The Shetland Movement gained two seats, bringing their total to seven. The Scottish National Party and Liberal Democrats also ran candidates for the first time.

Former Labour councillor Leonard Groat stood on an Independent Labour ticket in protest against his party's support for the closure of Montfield Hospital in Lerwick.

== Aggregate results ==
Shetland Islands Council election, 1990
Party	Seats	Gains	Losses	Net gain/loss	Seats %	Votes %	Votes	+/−
Independent	16	0	0	0	72	56.9	1,962	▼10.0
Shetland Movement	7	2	0	▲2	24	31.4	1,083	▲17.8
Independent Labour	1	1	0	▲1	4	0.0	0	New
Labour	1	0	4	▼3	1	7.1	246	▼9.5
Liberal Democrats	0	0	0	0	0.0	2.7	94	New
SNP	0	0	0	0	0	1.9	65	New

== Ward results ==
Aithsting and Sandsting
Party	Candidate	Votes	%
Independent	Florence Grains (incumbent)	unopposed	unopposed
Majority		unopposed	unopposed
Independent hold			

Bressay
Party	Candidate	Votes	%
Independent	James Irvine (incumbent)	unopposed	unopposed
Majority		unopposed	unopposed
Independent hold			

Burra & Trondra
Party	Candidate	Votes	%
Independent	George Pottinger	213	55.2%
Shetland Movement	William Cumming (incumbent)	173	44.8%
Majority		40	10.4%
Independent gain from Shetland Movement			

Delting North
Party	Candidate	Votes	%
Independent	Andrea Manson (incumbent)	unopposed	unopposed
Majority		unopposed	unopposed
Independent hold			

Delting South
Party	Candidate	Votes	%
Independent	Mary Colligan	unopposed	unopposed
Majority		unopposed	unopposed
Independent hold			

Dunrossness North
Party	Candidate	Votes	%
Independent	William Tait (incumbent)	unopposed	unopposed
Majority		unopposed	unopposed
Independent hold			

Dunrossness South
Party	Candidate	Votes	%
Shetland Movement	Magnus Flaws (incumbent)	225	79.8%
Independent	John Johnston	57	20.2%
Majority		168	59.6%
Shetland Movement gain from Independent			

Gulberwick, Quarff and Cunningsburgh
Party	Candidate	Votes	%
Independent	Joan McLeod (incumbent)	unopposed	unopposed
Majority		unopposed	unopposed
Independent hold			

Lerwick Breiwick
Party	Candidate	Votes	%
Independent	Cecil Eunson (Incumbent)	241	79.8%
Labour	Robert Adair	61	20.2%
Majority		180	59.6%
Independent hold			

Lerwick Central
Party	Candidate	Votes	%
Labour	Bill Smith (Incumbent)	185	66.3%
Liberal Democrats	Kenneth Crossan	94	36.7%
Majority		91	29.6%
Labour hold			

Lerwick Clickimin
Party	Candidate	Votes	%
Independent	Robert Johnson	122	36.9%
Shetland Movement	William Playfair	108	32.6%
Independent	Ian Byrne	101	30.5%
Majority		14	4.3%
Independent gain from Shetland Movement			

Lerwick Harbour
Party	Candidate	Votes	%
Shetland Movement	Edward Thomason (incumbent)	unopposed	unopposed
Majority		unopposed	unopposed
Shetland Movement hold			

Lerwick North
Party	Candidate	Votes	%
Independent Labour	Leonard Groat	unopposed	unopposed
Majority		unopposed	unopposed
Independent Labour gain from Labour			

Lerwick Sound
Party	Candidate	Votes	%
Shetland Movement	John Graham (Incumbent)	308	87.5%
Independent	Ian Selbie	44	12.5%
Majority		264	75.0%
Shetland Movement hold			

Lerwick Twageos
Party	Candidate	Votes	%
Independent	Lewis Shand Smith	179	43.6%
Independent	Michael Johnston (Incumbent)	174	42.3%
Independent	William Henderson	58	14.1%
Majority		5	1.3%
Independent hold			

Nesting and Lunnasting
Party	Candidate	Votes	%
Independent	Greta McElvogue	unopposed	unopposed
Majority		unopposed	unopposed
Independent hold			

Northmavine
Party	Candidate	Votes	%
Independent	James Manson	144	50.3%
Independent	Bill Manson	142	49.7%
Majority		2	0.6%
Independent gain from Labour			

Sandness and Walls
Party	Candidate	Votes	%
Independent	James Gear	unopposed	unopposed
Majority		unopposed	unopposed
Independent hold			

Sandwick
Party	Candidate	Votes	%
Shetland Movement	James Smith (Incumbent)	unopposed	unopposed
Majority		unopposed	unopposed
Shetland Movement gain from Independent			

Scalloway
Party	Candidate	Votes	%
Shetland Movement	William Anderson (Incumbent)	183	65.8%
Anti-Poll Tax	Ian Scott	95	34.2%
Majority		88	31.6%
Shetland Movement gain from Independent			

Unst
Party	Candidate	Votes	%
Independent	Joan Easten	200	64.9%
Independent	Elizabeth Nicolson (Incumbent)	108	35.1%
Majority		92	29.8%
Independent hold			

Whalsay and Skerries
Party	Candidate	Votes	%
Independent	Henry Stewart (incumbent)	unopposed	unopposed
Majority		unopposed	unopposed
Independent hold			

Whiteness, Weisdale and Tingwall
Party	Candidate	Votes	%
Independent	Alex Arthur (incumbent)	unopposed	unopposed
Majority		unopposed	unopposed
Independent hold			

Yell North and Fetlar
Party	Candidate	Votes	%
Shetland Movement	Andrew Williamson	86	36.6%
Independent	Philip Turner	73	31.1%
SNP	Derrick Tulloch	65	27.7%
Independent	Derek Rushton	7	3.0%
Independent	Philip Anderson	4	1.7%
Majority		13	5.5%
Shetland Movement gain from Independent			

Yell South
Party	Candidate	Votes	%
Shetland Movement	Robert Gray	unopposed	unopposed
Majority		unopposed	unopposed
Shetland Movement gain from Independent			

== By-elections since 1990 ==
1991 Northmavine by-election
Party	Candidate	Votes	%
Independent	Bill Manson	207	62.2%
Independent	Thomas Balfour	115	34.5%
Independent	James Paterson	11	3.3%
Majority		92	27.7%
Independent hold			

1993 Yell South by-election
Party	Candidate	Votes	%
Independent	Peter Guy	208	70.0%
Independent	Alan Ogden	89	30.0%
Majority		119	40.0%
Independent gain from Shetland Movement			

1993 Whalsay and Skerries by-election
Party	Candidate	Votes	%
Independent	Hazel Simpson	unopposed	unopposed
Majority		unopposed	unopposed
Independent hold			

1993 Whiteness, Weisdale and Tingwall by-election
Party	Candidate	Votes	%
Independent	Jonathan Wills	388	73.8%
Independent	A.M. Leslie	77	14.6%
Independent	J.W. Johnson	61	11.6%
Majority		311	59.2%
Independent hold			
