= 2003 Orkney Islands Council election =

2003 local election in Scotland

- 1 May 2003

All 21 seats to Orkney Islands Council 11 seats needed for a majority
	First party
Leader	Hugh Halcro-Johnston
Party	Independent
Leader's seat	Scapa and Kirkwall South West (defeated)
Last election	21 seats, 100.0%
Seats before	21
Seats won	21
Seat change	0
Popular vote	5,075
Percentage	100.0%
Swing	0.0%
Council Convener before election
Hugh Halcro-Johnston
Independent
Council Convener after election
Stephen Hagan
Independent

Elections to the Orkney Islands Council were held on 1 May 2003 as part of Scottish local elections. Only independent candidates contested the election. Nine seats were uncontested.

== Election results ==
Orkney Islands Council election, 2003
Party	Seats	Gains	Losses	Net gain/loss	Seats %	Votes %	Votes	+/−
Independent	21	0	0	0	100.0	100.0	5,075	0.0

== Ward results ==
Pickaquoy
Party	Candidate	Votes	%
Independent	Allan Leslie	241	70.3%
Independent	J Johnston	102	29.7%
Majority		139	40.6%
Independent hold			

Berstane & Work
Party	Candidate	Votes	%
Independent	Mike Drever (incumbent)	unopposed	unopposed
Majority		unopposed	unopposed
Independent hold			

Warrenfield
Party	Candidate	Votes	%
Independent	Roderick McLeod (Incumbent)	199	55.4%
Independent	N Craigie	160	44.6%
Majority		39	10.8%
Independent hold			

Lynnfield
Party	Candidate	Votes	%
Independent	A. Taylor (incumbent)	unopposed	unopposed
Majority		unopposed	unopposed
Independent hold			

Brandyquoy
Party	Candidate	Votes	%
Independent	R. Sclater (incumbent)	unopposed	unopposed
Majority		unopposed	unopposed
Independent hold			

Papdale
Party	Candidate	Votes	%
Independent	Janice Annal (incumbent)	unopposed	unopposed
Majority		unopposed	unopposed
Independent hold			

Scapa & Kirkwall South West
Party	Candidate	Votes	%
Independent	Ian MacDonald	215	53.1%
Independent	Hugh Halcro-Johnston (Incumbent)	190	46.9%
Majority		25	6.2%
Independent hold			

Shapinsay & Kirkwall Harbour
Party	Candidate	Votes	%
Independent	J Sinclair (incumbent)	unopposed	unopposed
Majority		unopposed	unopposed
Independent hold			

Stromness North
Party	Candidate	Votes	%
Independent	James Stockan	327	72.8%
Independent	J Brown (Incumbent)	122	27.2%
Majority		205	45.6%
Independent hold			

Stromness South, Graemsay & North Hoy
Party	Candidate	Votes	%
Independent	A Hutchison	207	53.5%
Independent	John Eccles	149	38.5%
Independent	Terry Thomson	31	8.0%
Majority		58	15.0%
Independent hold			

Orphir, Walls & Flotta
Party	Candidate	Votes	%
Independent	K Sutherland (Incumbent)	183	37.6%
Independent	P Hall	152	31.2%
Independent	J Flett	102	20.9%
Independent	I McFedries	50	10.3%
Majority		31	6.4%
Independent hold			

Firth & Sunnybrae
Party	Candidate	Votes	%
Independent	Alistair Gordon	249	53.0%
Independent	Eoin Scott (Incumbent)	221	47.0%
Majority		28	6.0%
Independent hold			

Harray & Stenness
Party	Candidate	Votes	%
Independent	J Hamilton (Incumbent)	331	84.7%
Independent	A Shearer	60	15.3%
Majority		271	69.4%
Independent hold			

Evie, Rendall, Rousay, Egilsay & Wyre
Party	Candidate	Votes	%
Independent	Jimmy Moar (Incumbent)	270	56.1%
Independent	J Hinckley	211	43.9%
Majority		59	12.1%
Independent hold			

Birsay & Dounby
Party	Candidate	Votes	%
Independent	K Johnson (incumbent)	unopposed	unopposed
Majority		unopposed	unopposed
Independent hold			

Sandwick & Stromness Landward
Party	Candidate	Votes	%
Independent	Ian Johnstone	226	47.3%
Independent	Freddie Groundwater (Incumbent)	190	39.7%
Independent	Mark Jones	62	13.0%
Majority		36	7.6%
Independent hold			

St Andrews, Deerness & Wideford
Party	Candidate	Votes	%
Independent	Jim Foubister (Incumbent)	310	69.8%
Independent	K Foubister	134	30.2%
Majority		176	39.6%
Independent hold			

Holm & Burray
Party	Candidate	Votes	%
Independent	Andrew Drever	unopposed	unopposed
Majority		unopposed	unopposed
Independent hold			

South Ronaldsay
Party	Candidate	Votes	%
Independent	C Annal (Incumbent)	209	54.9%
Independent	R Millar	172	45.1%
Majority		176	39.6%
Independent hold			

Sanday, North Ronaldsay & Stronsay
Party	Candidate	Votes	%
Independent	S Scott (Incumbent)	unopposed	unopposed
Majority		unopposed	unopposed
Independent hold			

Papa Westray, Westray & Eday
Party	Candidate	Votes	%
Independent	Stephen Hagan (Incumbent)	unopposed	unopposed
Majority		unopposed	unopposed
Independent hold			
