= Shetland Movement =

Defunct political group in the United Kingdom

The Shetland Movement was a pressure group and political party created in 1978 to advocate for greater autonomy in Shetland. The group called for the creation of a Shetland Assembly or 'Althing' with limited legislative powers and control over direct taxation. The group's membership included several key public figures in Shetland, including local author, politician and compiler of the Shetland Dictionary, John Graham and Shetland Islands Council Convener from 1986 to 1994, Edward Thomason.

== History ==
The Shetland Movement did not begin as a political party. In the 1982 Shetland Islands Council election the movement promoted candidates supportive of autonomy for Shetland, who won a majority of council seats. In the 1986 council election the Shetland Movement nominated candidates for the first time, winning 13.7% of the vote and five seats. The Shetland Movement decided to contest the 1987 general election for the Orkney and Shetland constituency, running John Goodlad as a joint candidate with Orcadian autonomists under the party label 'Orkney and Shetland Movement.' The Scottish National Party agreed to stand aside in favour of Goodlad, who won 14.5% of the vote.

It took part in the 1989 Scottish Constitutional Convention that developed a framework for the eventual Scottish devolution in 1999.

In the 1990 council election the Shetland Movement increased its representation to six seats, a level it maintained in 1994. However this marked the high point of the movement's electoral success. After 1994 the group dissolved, never contesting another local or general election.

In 2015 a short-lived cross party movement, Wir Shetland, was created to campaign for greater self-government for the islands, comparing itself to the Shetland Movement.

== Electoral performance ==
=== UK general elections (Orkney and Shetland) ===
Election	Candidate	Votes		Position
Election	Candidate	No.	Share	Position
1987	John Goodlad	3,095	14.5	4th

=== Shetland Islands Council elections ===
Year	Vote share	Seats
1986	13.6%	5 / 25
1990	31.4%	7 / 25
1994	9.0%	6 / 26
