= Orkney and Shetland Movement =

The Orkney and Shetland Movement was an electoral coalition formed for the 1987 general election comprising the Orkney Movement and Shetland Movement, political parties which advocated autonomy for Orkney and Shetland. They agreed on selecting John Goodlad, the secretary of the Shetland Fishermen's Association, as a joint candidate for the Orkney and Shetland constituency. The Scottish National Party agreed to stand aside in favour of the coalition.

Their candidate won 3,095 votes, which represented 14.5% of the vote in the small seat, but came fourth, just behind the Labour Party, the best result at the time for a candidate not from one of the four main parties in Scotland.

They took part in the 1989 Scottish Constitutional Convention that developed a framework for the eventual Scottish devolution in 1999.

It saw as its models the Isle of Man and the Faroe Islands, an autonomous dependency of Denmark.
