= Renfrewshire Council elections =

Local government elections in Renfrewshire, Scotland

Renfrewshire Council in Scotland holds elections every five years, previously holding them every four years from its creation as a single-tier authority in 1995 to 2007.

== Council elections ==
Year	SNP	Labour	Conservative	Liberal Democrats	Independent
1995	13	22	2	3	0
1999 (Note: New ward boundaries.)	15	21	1	3	0
2003	15	21	1	3	0
2007 (Note: Change to single transferable vote system and new ward boundaries.)	17	17	2	4	0
2012	15	22	1	1	1
2017 (Note: New ward boundaries.)	19	13	8	1	2
2022	21	15	5	1	1

== Results maps ==
2003 results map

2007 results map

2012 results map

== By-elections ==
=== 2003-2007 ===
Elderslie By-Election 7 December 2006
Party	Candidate	Votes	%	±%
Labour	John Caldwell	608	39.0	−19.9
SNP		543	34.9	+12.3
Conservative		198	12.7	+2.5
Liberal Democrats		159	10.2	+1.9
Scottish Socialist		50	3.2	+3.2
Majority		65	4.2	
Turnout		1,558		
Labour hold		Swing		

=== 2007-2012 ===
Paisley South By-Election 17 March 2011
Party	Candidate	FPv%	Count		
Party	Candidate	FPv%	1	2	3
Labour	Roy Glen	49.3	2,081	2,102	2,121
SNP	David McCartney	32.4	1,366	1,382	1,404
Conservative	Alison Cook	18.54	388	392	441
Independent	Gary Pearson	3.9	164	179	198
Liberal Democrats	Ross Stalker	3.2	134	139	
Scottish Socialist	Jimmy Kerr	1.9	82		
Labour gain from SNP					
Valid: 4,215 Spoilt: 31 Quota: 2,108 Turnout: 4,246

=== 2012-2017 ===
Renfrew South and Gallowhill By-Election 11 August 2016
Party	Candidate	FPv%	Count			
Party	Candidate	FPv%	1	2	3	4
SNP	Jim Paterson	47.8	1,309	1,318	1,356	1,809
Labour	Edward Grady	36.9	1,012	1,030	1,180	
Conservative	Mark Dougan	13.4	366	377		
Liberal Democrats	Ross Stalker	1.9	53			
SNP gain from Labour						
Valid: 2,740 Spoilt: 22 Quota: 1,371 Turnout: 2,762
