= Michelle Campbell (politician) =

Scottish politician

Michelle Campbell MSP
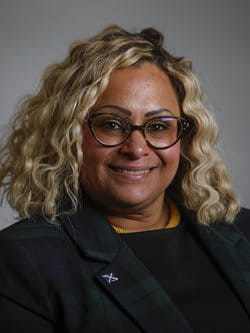
- Official portrait, 2026

Member of the Scottish Parliament for Renfrewshire North and Cardonald
- Incumbent
- Assumed office 7 May 2026
- Preceded by: Constituency established
- Majority: 4,876 (13.9%)

Personal details
- Born: Michelle Simone Campbell
- Party: Scottish National Party

Michelle Simone Campbell (born 1983) is a Scottish politician and nurse who has served as the Member of the Scottish Parliament (MSP) for Renfrewshire North and Cardonald since 2026, representing the Scottish National Party (SNP).

Campbell has represented Erskine and Inchinnan on Renfrewshire Council since 2017. She applied to replace Derek Mackay in the 2021 Scottish Parliament election. She previously worked for Paisley and Renfrewshire North MP Gavin Newlands. In addition to being the candidate for the Renfrewshire North and Cardonald constituency at the 2026 Scottish Parliament election, she was 3rd on the West Scotland party list. She was successfully elected at the constituency level.

== Early life and career ==
Campbell is of Ugandan heritage. Her grandparents fled Idi Amin's regime in the 1970s and lived on an RAF base for two years before moving to Glenrothes in Fife.

Campbell is a registered mental nurse with over two decades of experience in the NHS. She lives in the Erskine area of Renfrewshire.

== Political career ==
=== Renfrewshire Council ===
Campbell was first elected to Renfrewshire Council in 2017, representing the Erskine and Inchinnan ward (Ward 12) for the SNP. She was re-elected in the 2022 Scottish local elections in the same ward. During her time on the council she served as:

- Convener of the Infrastructure, Land and Environment Policy Board
- Convener of the Community Asset Transfer Sub-committee
- Depute Convener of the Economy and Regeneration Policy Board
- Member of the Leadership Board

She also sat on the SNP's National Executive Committee.

=== 2021 Scottish Parliament election ===
Campbell stood as the top candidate on the SNP's West Scotland regional list at the 2021 Scottish Parliament election but was not elected, as the SNP did not win enough list seats in the region to reach her position. SNP won almost all constituency seats and under the proportional system didn’t reach the bar for list seats to be won

=== 2026 Scottish Parliament election ===
In April 2025, Campbell was confirmed as the SNP's candidate for the newly created Renfrewshire North and Cardonald constituency, having been the unopposed choice of local SNP members. The constituency was created by the Second Periodic Review of Scottish Parliament Boundaries ahead of the 2026 Scottish Parliament election, replacing the former Renfrewshire North and West seat. It incorporated Cardonald, previously part of the Glasgow Pollok constituency, while losing areas including Kilmacolm, Bridge of Weir and Houston to other new seats.

At the election on 7 May 2026, Campbell was elected as the first MSP for the constituency, defeating Labour's Mike McKirdy into second place. The full result was:

Candidate	Party	Votes	%
Michelle Campbell	SNP	14,300	40.87
Mike McKirdy	Labour	9,424	26.93
Moira Ramage	Reform UK	7,083	20.24
Jack Hall	Conservative	1,929	5.51
Grant Toghill	Liberal Democrats	1,642	4.69
Jim Halfpenny	TUSC	610	1.74
SNP majority		4,876	13.94
Turnout		34,988	53.51%

The result represented a notional swing of 2.9% from the SNP to Labour compared to the estimated 2021 notional result on the new boundaries. On election night, Campbell said her first priority as MSP would be to establish a "local and accessible" constituency office so that residents across the new seat could easily reach her.
