= Renfrewshire North and Cardonald =

Constituency of the Scottish Parliament

- Burgh constituency for the Scottish Parliament
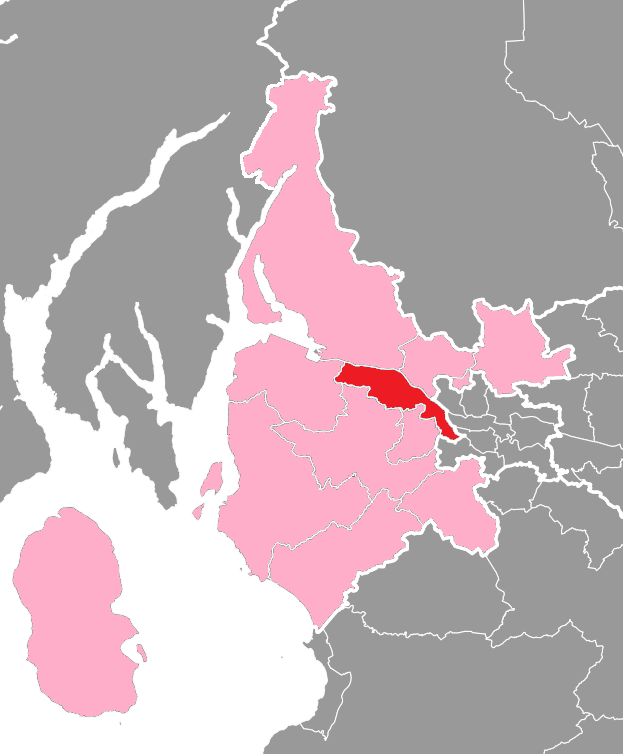

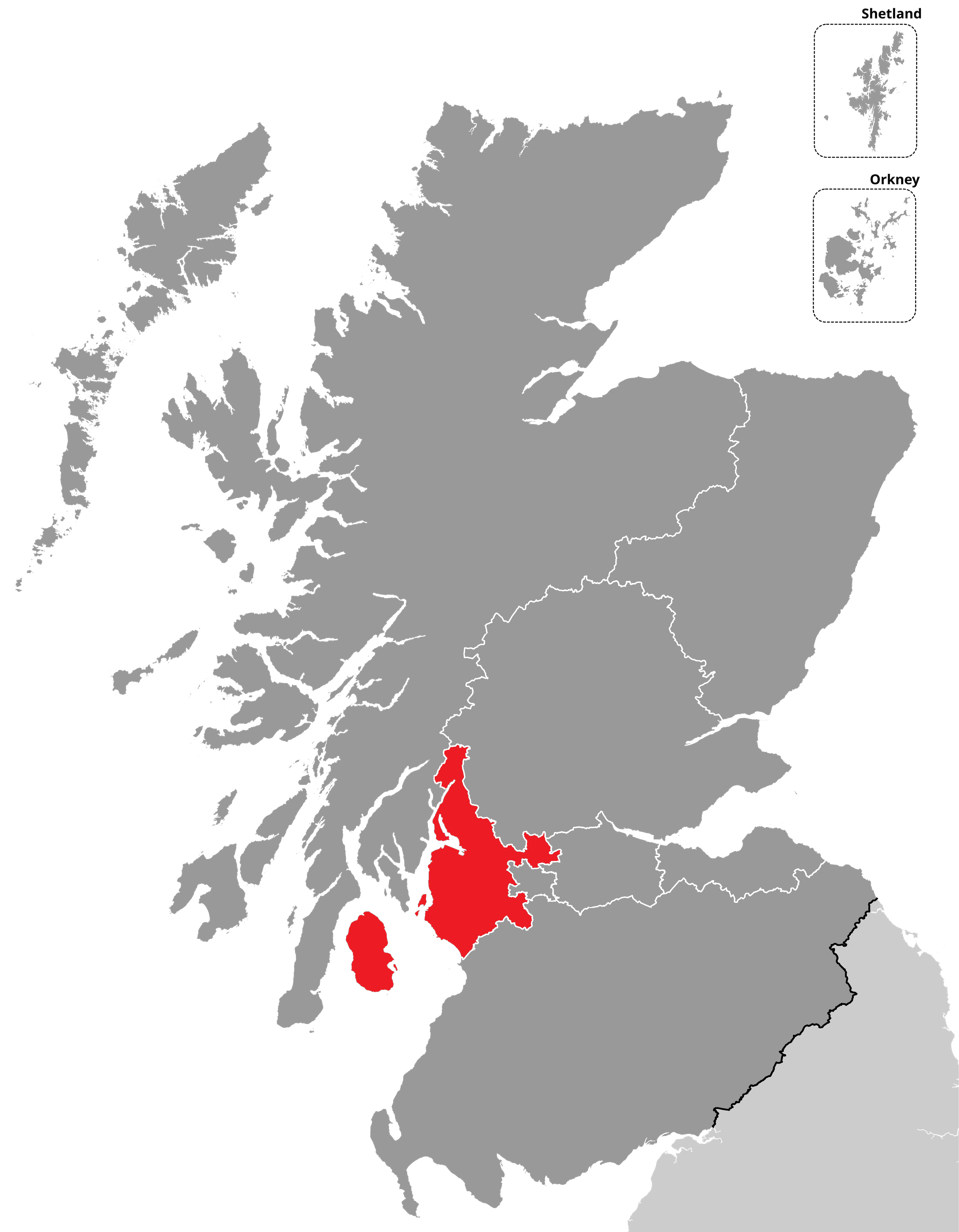
- Renfrewshire North and Cardonald shown within the West Scotland electoral region and the region shown within Scotland
- Electoral region: West Scotland
- Electorate: 65,390 (2026)
- Major settlements: Bishopton, Cardonald, Erskine, Renfrew

Current constituency
- Created: 2026
- Seats: 1
- Party: Scottish National Party
- MSP: Michelle Campbell
- Council area: Renfrewshire, Glasgow
- Created from: Renfrewshire North and West, Glasgow Pollok

Renfrewshire North and Cardonald is a burgh constituency of the Scottish Parliament covering parts of the council areas of Renfrewshire and Glasgow. Under the additional-member electoral system used for elections to the Scottish Parliament, it elects one Member of the Scottish Parliament (MSP) by the first past the post method of election. It is also one of ten constituencies in the West Scotland electoral region, which elects seven additional members, in addition to the ten constituency MSPs, to produce a form of proportional representation for the region as a whole.

The seat was created by the Second Periodic Review of Scottish Parliament Boundaries in 2025, and was first contested at the 2026 Scottish Parliament election, when it was won by Michelle Campbell of the SNP.

== Electoral region ==
The other nine constituencies of the West Scotland region are: Cunninghame North, Cunninghame South, Clydebank and Milngavie, Dumbarton, Eastwood, Inverclyde, Paisley, Renfrewshire West and Levern Valley, and Strathkelvin and Bearsden. The region covers the whole of the council areas of East Dunbartonshire, East Renfrewshire, Inverclyde, North Ayrshire, Renfrewshire, and West Dunbartonshire; and parts of the council areas of Argyll and Bute, East Ayrshire, and Glasgow.

== Constituency boundaries ==
The constituency was formed at the Second Periodic Review of Scottish Parliament Boundaries in 2025, when Boundaries Scotland determined that due to a relative decline in population compared to other parts of Scotland, the Glasgow and Greater Renfrewshire region was required to lose one seat. As a result, a seat crossing the boundary between Renfrewshire and Glasgow was established. Renfrewshire North and Cardonald is largely a replacement for Renfrewshire North and West, but also including areas that were formerly in the Glasgow Pollok constituency. Both of these constituencies were abolished as a result of the second periodic review. Following this review, the Renfrewshire North and Cardonald seat comprises the following electoral wards of Renfrewshire Council and Glasgow City Council:

- Renfrewshire:
  - Renfrew North and Braehead (entire ward)
  - Renfrew South and Gallowhill (shared with Paisley)
  - Bishopton, Bridge of Weir and Langbank (shared with Renfrewshire West and Levern Valley)
  - Erskine and Inchinnan (entire ward)
- Glasgow:
  - Cardonald (entire ward)

== Member of the Scottish Parliament ==
Election	Member	Party
2026	Michelle Campbell	SNP

== Election results ==
=== 2020s ===
2026 Scottish Parliament election: Renfrewshire North and Cardonald (Note: Note that changes in vote share are shown with respect to the notional result of the 2021 election, calculated to account for boundary changes)
Party	Candidate	Constituency			Regional		
Party	Candidate	Votes	%	±%	Votes	%	±%
SNP	Michelle Simone Campbell	14,300	40.9	▼8.5	9,936	28.4	
Labour	Mike McKirdy	9,424	26.9	▼1.1	7,501	21.4	
Reform	Moira Ramage	7,083	20.2	New	7,204	20.6	
Green					4,460	12.7	
Conservative	Jack Hall	1,929	5.5	▼12.2	2,309	6.6	
Liberal Democrats	Grant Robert Toghill	1,642	4.7	▲2.5	1,401	4.0	
TUSC	Jim Halfpenny	610	1.7				
AtLS					379	1.1	
Independent Green Voice					372	1.1	
Scottish Family					320	1.0	
Socialist Labour					299	0.9	
ISP					191	0.5	
Scottish Socialist					174	0.5	
Liberal					160	0.5	
Alliance for Democracy and Freedom Scotland					87	0.2	
Independent	William Wallace				87	0.2	
UKIP					44	0.1	
Independent	Paddy McCarthy				33	0.1	
Scottish Common Party					32	0.1	
Scottish Libertarian					29	0.1	
Independent	Paul Mack				15	0.0	
Majority		4,876	13.9				
Valid votes		34,988			35,033		
Invalid votes		162			109		
Turnout		35,150	53.8		35,142	53.7	
SNP win (new boundaries)							

== See also ==
- List of Scottish Parliament constituencies and electoral regions (2026–)
