= 2012 Renfrewshire Council election =

2012 Scottish local government election

← 2007	3 May 2012	2017 →

All 40 seats to Renfrewshire Council 21 seats needed for a majority
	First party	Second party	Third party
Leader	Mark MacMillan	Brian Lawson	James MacLaren
Party	Labour	SNP	Conservative
Leader's seat	Paisley Southwest	Paisley East and Ralston	Bishopton, Bridge of Weir and Langbank
Last election	17 seats, 42.5%	17 seats, 42.5.5%	2 seats, 5%
Seats before	19	16	1
Seats won	22	15	1
Seat change	▲5	▼2	▼1
	Fourth party	Fifth party
Leader	Eileen McCartin	Paul Mack
Party	Liberal Democrats	Independent
Leader's seat	Paisley Southwest	Paisley South
Last election	4 seat, 10.0%	0 seat, 0%
Seats before	1	0
Seats won	1	1
Seat change	▼3	▲1
- Map of council wards
Council Leader before election
Brian Lawson
SNP
Council Leader after election
Mark MacMillan
Labour

The 2012 Renfrewshire Council election took place on 3 May 2012 to elect members of Renfrewshire Council. The election used the eleven wards created as a result of the Local Governance (Scotland) Act 2004, with each ward electing three or four Councillors using the single transferable vote system form of proportional representation, with 40 Councillors being elected.

The election saw the Scottish Labour Party gain five seats to regain an overall majority on the council that they had lost at the time of the 2007 Local Elections, while also significantly increasing their vote. The Scottish National Party remained in second place on the council but recorded a disappointing performance as the party lost two seats and saw a slight drop in its vote share. Both the Scottish Conservative and Unionist Party and the Scottish Liberal Democrats declined in numbers to just one seat each. Meanwhile, Independent and former Labour Party member, Paul Mack, secured a seat on the council.

Following the election the Labour majority administration was formed. This replaced the previous SNP – Lib Dem coalition that had existed from 2007 to 2012.

== Election result ==
Renfrewshire local election result 2012
Party	Seats	Gains	Losses	Net gain/loss	Seats %	Votes %	Votes	+/−
Labour	22	5	0	+5	55.0	47.6	25,812	+10.8
SNP	15	1	3	-2	37.5	35.3	19,131	-0.1
Conservative	1	0	1	-1	2.5	9.1	4,939	-2.4
Liberal Democrats	1	0	3	-3	2.5	4.4	2,367	-5.3
Independent	1	1	0	+1	2.5	1.6	881	-2.0
Scottish Socialist	0	-	-	-	-	1.2	678	0.0
TUSC	0	-	-	-	-	0.74	401	New
Scottish Christian	0	-	-	-	-	0.1	42	New

Note: "Votes" are the first preference votes. The net gain/loss and percentage changes relate to the result of the previous Scottish local elections on 3 May 2007. This may differ from other published sources showing gain/loss relative to seats held at dissolution of Scotland's councils.

== Ward results ==
=== Renfrew North ===
- 2007: 2xSNP; 1xLab
- 2012: 2xLab; 1xSNP
- 2007-2012 Change: Lab gain one seat from SNP

Renfrew North – 3 seats
Party	Candidate	FPv%	Count						
Party	Candidate	FPv%	1	2	3	4	5	6	7
SNP	Bill Perrie (incumbent)	34.32	1,398						
Labour	Bill Brown	25.55	1,041						
Labour	Alexander Murrin (incumbent)	19.10	778	798.9	817.2	831.7	858.4	920.8	1,150.5
SNP	John Shaw	11.71	477	802.9	803.5	818.1	833.7	880.9	
Conservative	Makarand Oak	5.52	225	229.6	229.9	235.2	269.2		
Liberal Democrats	Euan Campbell	2.38	97	104	104.6	111.9			
TUSC	Gerry Kavanagh	1.42	58	60.9	61.4				
Electorate: 9,521 Valid: 4,074 Spoilt: 98 Quota: 1,019 Turnout: 4,172 (42.79%)

=== Renfrew South and Gallowhill ===
- 2007: 2xLab; 1xSNP
- 2012: 2xLab; 1xSNP
- 2007-2012 Change: No change

Renfrew South and Gallowhill – 3 seats
Party	Candidate	FPv%	Count					
Party	Candidate	FPv%	1	2	3	4	5	6
SNP	Cathy McEwan (incumbent)	28.87	1,258					
Labour	Eddie Grady (incumbent)†	28.20	1,229					
Labour	Margaret Devine	19.94	869	875	992.9	1,013.1	1,054.1	1,105.2
SNP	Garry Quigley	14.43	629	773.2	777.7	788.4	805.6	824.4
Conservative	Helen Mathie	4.52	197	198.9	200.2	228.1	235.2	
Scottish Socialist	Douglas Canning	2.07	90	93.5	96.5	99.7		
Liberal Democrats	Michael Hanley	1.97	86	87.9	90.1			
Electorate: 10,342 Valid: 4,358 Spoilt: 100 Quota: 1,090 Turnout: 4,458 (42.14%)

=== Paisley East and Ralston ===
- 2007: 2xSNP; 1xLib Dem; 1xLab
- 2012: 2xLab; 2xSNP
- 2007-2012 Change: Lab gain one seat from Lib Dem

Paisley East and Ralston – 4 seats
Party	Candidate	FPv%	Count						
Party	Candidate	FPv%	1	2	3	4	5	6	7
Labour	Jim Sharkey (incumbent)	32.69	1,832						
SNP	Brian Lawson (incumbent)	27.80	1,558						
Conservative	Robert Evans	10.28	576	584.1	593.1	602.9	603.2	827.7	
SNP	Will Mylet	9.44	529	545.7	900.8	940.8	941.7	1,042.2	1,196.4
Liberal Democrats	John Boyd	9.08	509	522.9	543.4	563.9	564.8		
Labour	Maureen Sharkey	8.21	460	1,071.9	1,086.8	1,128.1			
Scottish Socialist	Andy Bowden	2.52	141	153.4	160.9				
Electorate: 12,687 Valid: 5,605 Spoilt: 115 Quota: 1,120 Turnout: 5,720 (44.18%)

=== Paisley North West ===
- 2007: 2xLab; 1xSNP; 1xLib Dem
- 2012: 2xLab; 2xSNP
- 2007-2012 Change: SNP gain from Lib Dem

Paisley North West – 4 seats
Party	Candidate	FPv%	Count							
Party	Candidate	FPv%	1	2	3	4	5	6	7	8
Labour	Terry Kelly (incumbent)	29.82	1,349							
SNP	Kenny MacLaren (incumbent)	23.98	1,085							
Labour	Tommy Williams (incumbent)	15.89	719	1,045.5						
SNP	Mags MacLaren	10.68	483	498.5	654.4	667.1	702.2	747.9	791.7	939.5
Conservative	Allison Cook	6.34	287	293.6	297.6	303.7	310.5	365.7		
Independent	David Murdoch	5.37	243	256.5	261.9	281.9	321.2	376.9	497.9	
Liberal Democrats	Mike Dillon (incumbent)	4.66	211	226.8	230.9	244.5	257.1			
Scottish Socialist	Jimmy Kerr	3.25	147	162.5	164.8	177				
Electorate: 12,944 Valid: 4,524 Spoilt: 80 Quota: 905 Turnout: 4,604 (34.95%)

=== Paisley South ===
- 2007: 2xSNP; 1xLab; 1xLib Dem
- 2012: 2xLab; 1xSNP; 1xIndependent
- 2007-2012 Change: Lab and Independent gain one seat from SNP and Lib Dem

Paisley South – 4 seats
Party	Candidate	FPv%	Count							
Party	Candidate	FPv%	1	2	3	4	5	6	7	8
Labour	Eddie Devine (incumbent)	31.66	1,827							
SNP	Marie McGurk (incumbent)	22.98	1,326							
Labour	Roy Glen	16.46	950	1,494.4						
Independent	Paul Mack	11.06	638	673.7	738.2	752.9	783.4	808.3	975.9	1,206.6
Conservative	Ron Garrett	7.24	418	436.4	450.5	454.1	461.3	504.1		
SNP	Gavin Newlands	7.23	417	425.4	451.1	583.6	600.1	628.3	673.6	
Liberal Democrats	Graeme McMeekin	2.05	118	125.4	141.1	145.1	149.9			
TUSC	Harry Pfaff	1.32	76	81.9	102.3	103.7				
Electorate: 13,712 Valid: 5,770 Spoilt: 118 Quota: 1,155 Turnout: 5,888 (42.08%)

=== Paisley South West ===
- 2007: 2xLab; 1xSNP; 1xLib Dem
- 2012: 2xLab; 1xSNP; 1xLib Dem
- 2007-2012 Change: No change

Paisley South West – 4 seats
Party	Candidate	FPv%	Count						
Party	Candidate	FPv%	1	2	3	4	5	6	7
SNP	Lorraine Cameron (incumbent)	26.57	1,335						
Labour	Mark MacMillan (incumbent)	24.78	1,245						
Labour	Jacqueline Henry	20.98	1,054						
Liberal Democrats	Eileen McCartin (incumbent)	14.67	737	760.2	797	804.4	830.8	955	1,148.5
SNP	Mike Loftus	5.71	287	541.8	565	569.4	596.6	623.9	
Conservative	Sheila Fulton	5.17	260	266.2	277.7	280.3	287.9		
Scottish Socialist	John Miller	2.13	107	115.4	140.7	145.4			
Electorate: 11,743 Valid: 5,025 Spoilt: 93 Quota: 1,006 Turnout: 5,118 (42.79%)

=== Johnstone South, Elderslie and Howwood ===
- 2007: 3xLab; 1xSNP
- 2012: 3xLab; 1xSNP
- 2007-2012 Change: No change

Johnstone South, Elderslie and Howwood – 4 seats
Party	Candidate	FPv%	Count							
Party	Candidate	FPv%	1	2	3	4	5	6	7	8
Labour	Iain McMillan (incumbent)	24.70	1,361							
Labour	John Caldwell (incumbent)	23.59	1,300							
Labour	John Hood (incumbent)	14.94	823	1,032.5	1,194.1					
SNP	Stephen McGee	13.67	753	758.9	764.2	769.9	779.3	800.5	860.9	1,511.4
SNP	Tracie McGee (incumbent)	11.92	657	668.9	672.6	677.5	693.4	711.9	762.8	
Conservative	John McIntyre	6.8	372	374.7	377.1	380.4	419.1	440.5		
Scottish Socialist	Gerry McCartney	2.38	131	134.9	141	147.9	156.4			
Liberal Democrats	Ryan Morrison	2.05	113	115.7	117.8	121.1				
Electorate: 12,847 Valid: 5,510 Spoilt: 129 Quota: 1,103 Turnout: 5,639 (42.89%)

=== Johnstone North, Kilbarchan and Lochwinnoch ===
- 2007: 2xSNP; 1xLab
- 2012: 2xLab; 1xSNP
- 2007-2012 Change: Lab gain one seat from SNP

Johnstone North, Kilbarchan and Lochwinnoch – 3 seats
Party	Candidate	FPv%	Count							
Party	Candidate	FPv%	1	2	3	4	5	6	7	8
Labour	Derek Bibby	37.03	1,750							
SNP	Andy Doig	20.80	983	1,024.9	1,027.9	1,031.9	1,048.8	1,067.3	1,148.8	1,728.7
Labour	Christopher Gilmour	16.27	769	1,218.5						
Conservative	Wilma Begg	8.48	401	413.7	415.5	427	427.1	466.7		
SNP	Ken MacDonald	12.70	600	616.6	619.4	623.4	628.7	650.3	708.6	
Liberal Democrats	Margaret McDonough	2.52	119	125.5	127.5	134.6	141			
Scottish Socialist	Geoff Knowles	1.31	62	66.2	68.7	72.1				
Scottish Christian	Alex Lennox	0.88	42	45.2	46.8					
Electorate: 10,048 Valid: 4,726 Spoilt: 98 Quota: 1,182 Turnout: 4,824 (47.03%)

=== Houston, Crosslee and Linwood ===
- 2007: 2xSNP; 1xLab; 1xCon
- 2012: 2xLab; 2xSNP
- 2007-2012 Change: Lab gain one seat from Con

Houston, Crosslee and Linwood – 4 seats
Party	Candidate	FPv%	Count					
Party	Candidate	FPv%	1	2	3	4	5	6
Labour	Stuart Clark	28.77	1,454					
Labour	Anne Hall (incumbent)	24.34	1,230					
SNP	Allan Noon (incumbent)	17.12	865	923.2	936.4	954.1	985.2	1,089.4
SNP	Audrey Doig (incumbent)	14.94	755	801.3	835.5	847.5	869.9	951.3
Conservative	Tom Begg	11.81	597	633.9	643.3	654.5	700.9	
Liberal Democrats	Allan Heron	1.84	93	124.9	135.7	153.1		
TUSC	Danny Williamson	1.17	59	92.5	107.1			
Electorate: 11,743 Valid: 5,053 Spoilt: 88 Quota: 1,011 Turnout: 5,141 (43.03%)

=== Bishopton, Bridge of Weir and Langbank ===
- 2007: 1xCon; 1xSNP; 1xLab
- 2012: 1xLab; 1xCon; 1xSNP
- 2007-2012 Change: No change

Bishopton, Bridge of Weir and Langbank – 3 seats
Party	Candidate	FPv%	Count
Party	Candidate	FPv%	1
Labour	Michael Holmes (incumbent)	30.35	1,277
Conservative	James MacLaren	29.25	1,231
SNP	Maria Brown	27.80	1,170
SNP	Margaret Dymond	6.99	294
Liberal Democrats	Martin Heron	4.11	173
TUSC	Warren Vale	1.50	63
Electorate: 8,974 Valid: 4,208 Spoilt: 42 Quota: 1,053 Turnout: 4,250 (46.89%)

=== Erskine and Inchinnan ===
- 2007: 2xLab; 2xSNP
- 2012: 2xLab; 2xSNP
- 2007-2012 Change: No change

Erskine and Inchinnan – 4 seats
Party	Candidate	FPv%	Count	
Party	Candidate	FPv%	1	2
Labour	James Harte (incumbent)	26.38	1,424	
SNP	Iain Nicolson (incumbent)	21.67	1,170	
SNP	James McQuade (incumbent)	20.41	1,102	
Labour	Sam Mullin (incumbent)	19.84	1,071	1,371.8
Conservative	Steven Millar	6.95	375	382.5
TUSC	Jim Halfpenny	2.69	145	150.8
Liberal Democrats	Ross Stalker	2.06	111	117
Electorate: 12,963 Valid: 5,398 Spoilt: 91 Quota: 1,080 Turnout: 5,489 (41.64%)

== Post-Election Changes ==
- † Renfrew South and Gallowhill Labour Cllr Eddie Grady died on 23 May 2016. A by-election was held on 11 August 2016 and the seat was won by the SNP's Jim Paterson.

== By-election since 2012 ==
Renfrew South and Gallowhill By-election (11 August 2016) – 1 Seat
Party	Candidate	FPv%	Count			
Party	Candidate	FPv%	1	2	3	4
SNP	Jim Paterson	47.8	1,309	1,318	1,356	1,809
Labour	Edward Grady	36.9	1,012	1,030	1,180	
Conservative	Mark Dougan	13.4	366	377		
Liberal Democrats	Ross Stalker	1.9	53			
Electorate: 10,466 Valid: 2,740 Spoilt: 22 Quota: 1,371 Turnout: 2,762 (26.18%)
