= Bruce McFee =

Scottish politician (1961–2021)

Member of the Scottish Parliament for West of Scotland
- In office 1 May 2003 – 2 April 2007

Personal details
- Born: 18 May 1961 Johnstone, Scotland
- Died: 9 September 2021 (aged 60) Paisley, Scotland
- Party: Scottish National Party

Bruce James McFee (18 May 1961 – 9 September 2021) was a Scottish National Party (SNP) politician. He was elected as a Member of the Scottish Parliament (MSP) for the West of Scotland region at the 2003 election. McFee served on the Scottish Parliament's Procedures and Justice Committees. He was also a Deputy Whip in 2004 and 2005.He was also on the Local Government and Transport Committee twice with only an 9 day gap between leaving the Committee at the end of the first time and rejoining at the beginning of the second time. He was involved in local campaigns to save Ferguson's shipyard in Port Glasgow and to retain the name of the University of Paisley.

He had previously served as leader of the SNP group on Renfrewshire Council and was re-elected to the council in 2007, representing the Johnstone North, Kilbarchan and Lochwinnoch ward. He did not seek re-election to the Scottish Parliament in 2007 and retired from local government at the 2012 Scottish local elections.

McFee suffered a stroke in March 2019, which saw him enter full-time care thereafter. He died in Paisley, Renfrewshire on 9 September 2021 at the age of 60.
