= West Renfrewshire =

West Renfrewshire and Renfrewshire West may mean or refer to:

- West Renfrewshire (UK Parliament constituency)
- West Renfrewshire (Scottish Parliament constituency)
- Renfrewshire West and Levern Valley (Scottish Parliament constituency)
- Inverclyde, the council area containing the western part of the county of Renfrewshire
