= George Adam =

Scottish Cabinet & Parliamentary Business Minister

George Adam MSP
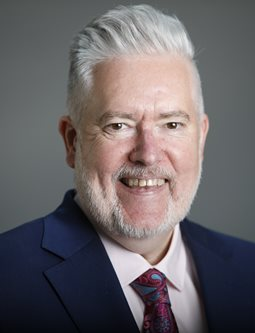
- Official portrait, 2026

Minister for Parliamentary Business (Note: Minister for Cabinet and Parliamentary Business from 29 March to 20 June 2023.)
- In office 20 May 2021 – 8 May 2024
- First Minister: Nicola Sturgeon; Humza Yousaf
- Preceded by: Graeme Dey
- Succeeded by: Jamie Hepburn

Member of the Scottish Parliament for Paisley
- Incumbent
- Assumed office 5 May 2011
- Preceded by: Constituency created
- Majority: 3,028 (9.8%)

Personal details
- Born: 8 June 1969 (age 57) Elderslie, Renfrewshire, Scotland
- Party: Scottish National Party (since 1987)
- Spouse: Stacey Adam
- Children: James Adam Jessica Adam
- Website: www.paisleysmsp.org

George James Adam (born 8 June 1969) is a Scottish politician who served as the Minister for Parliamentary Business from 2021 to 2024. A member of the Scottish National Party (SNP), he has been the Member of the Scottish Parliament (MSP) for Paisley since 2011.

Adam ran unsuccessfully as the SNP's candidate for Paisley North in the 2003 Scottish Parliament election. In 2007, he was elected to the Renfrewshire Council, representing the Paisley South ward until 2012. Adam ran for the newly drawn Paisley constituency in the 2011 election and this time was elected to the Scottish Parliament. He was re-elected in the 2016 and 2021 election, serving three terms. Adam was appointed as Minister for Parliamentary Business by Nicola Sturgeon, in her third government.

== Early life ==
=== Early years ===
George James Adam was born on 8 June 1969 in Elderslie, Renfrewshire, in western Scotland. When Adam was nine, his father's business went into receivership which resulted in a complete change in his family’s lifestyle, with Adam moving out of his family home to share a home in Glenburn, Paisley, with his father's cousin, and then living in a caravan after being reunited with his parents. Adam's father left the family home twice, with George being told by his mother that he was "the man of the house".

In the 1980s, Adam's family moved to South Africa for a "fresh start"; he was angered by the decision due to his success in the youth team at St Mirren F.C. His father's business "turned sour" and the family returned to Scotland two years later. They lived in Adam's grandfather's home, where he slept on the sofa. In his late teens, Adam worked for his father's business before working in the motor industry as a Corporate Sales Manager.

=== Early political years ===
Adam joined the Scottish National Party at the age of 17 and has been an active member in Paisley since the late 1980s. In the 2003 Scottish Parliament election, he stood as the SNP candidate in Paisley North but was not successful, with Labour holding the seat.

Adam was elected to the Paisley South ward of Renfrewshire Council in the 2007 Scottish local elections.

== Member of the Scottish Parliament ==
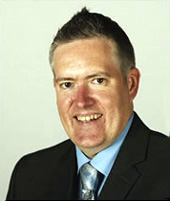
Official parliamentary portrait, 2011

He won the newly drawn Paisley constituency in the 2011 Scottish Parliament election, with a majority of 248. He served on the Scottish Parliament's Public Audit Committee, the Health and Sport Committee, the Education and Culture Committee and on the Standards, Procedures and Public Appointments Committee. On 1 October 2012 he was appointed as Parliamentary Liaison Officer to the Cabinet Secretary for Education and Lifelong Learning, Angela Constance.

Adam was re-elected to the Scottish Parliament in 2016 with an increased majority of 5,199. He was Senior Whip for the Parliamentary Group of SNP MSPs but was promoted to Chief Whip in June 2018. He held the position of Parliamentary Liaison Officer (PLO) to the Cabinet Secretary Communities, Social Security and Equalities. As he was a member of the Social Security Committee, in September 2016 a decision was taken for him not to also act as an aide, to avoid potential conflict of interest.

Adam was the Convenor of the Cross Party Group on Multiple Sclerosis (MS), was the Co-Convenor of the Cross Party Group (CPG) on Fair Trade and was a member of the following CPGs – Adult Learning, Aviation, Carers and Epilepsy. He is also the patron for Disability Equality Scotland, a charity based in Alloa, that promotes full access and inclusion for disabled people in Scotland.

Adam was re-elected in the 2021 Scottish Parliament election with an increased majority of 6,075. He was appointed by First Minister Nicola Sturgeon as junior Minister for Parliamentary Business.

== Personal life ==
Adam lives in Paisley town centre with his wife Stacey. Due to his wife Stacey having multiple sclerosis (MS), they are both members of the Multiple Sclerosis Society of Scotland.

Adam is a passionate supporter of St Mirren F.C. In 2016, together with Gordon Scott, he led a fan takeover of the club. Adam chaired the St Mirren Independent Supporters Association (SMISA) which had signed up one thousand members by June, in order to bid for control of the club. He follows the Scotland national football team when he can.

Scottish Parliament
New constituency	Member of the Scottish Parliament for Paisley; 2011–present	Incumbent
