= 2022 Renfrewshire Council election =

2022 Scottish local government election

- 5 May 2022

All 43 seats to Renfrewshire Council 22 seats needed for a majority
- Turnout: 44.4% ▼3.6%
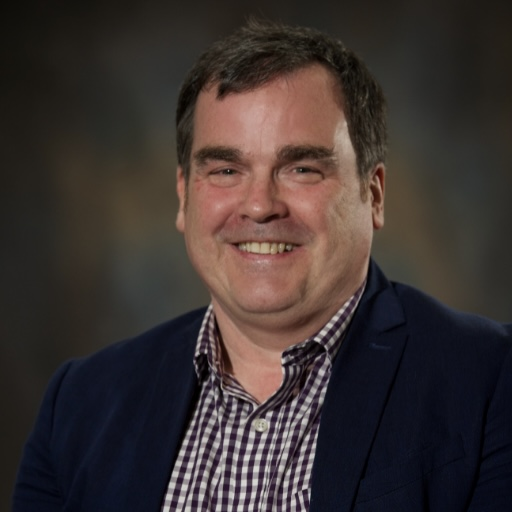
	First party	Second party	Third party
		Lab	Con
Leader	Iain Nicolson	Eddie Devine	Neill Graham
Party	SNP	Labour	Conservative
Leader's seat	Erskine and Inchinnan	Paisley Southeast	Paisley Northeast and Ralston
Last election	19 seats, 37.6%	13 seats, 19.4%	8 seat, 21.0%
Seats before	19	13	7
Seats won	21	15	5
Seat change	▲2	▲2	▼3
	Fourth party	Fifth party
	LD	Ind
Leader	Eileen McCartin (retiring)	N/A
Party	Liberal Democrats	Independent
Leader's seat	Paisley Southwest	N/A
Last election	1 seat, 4.1%	2
Seats before	1	3
Seats won	1	1
Seat change	0	▼1
Council Leader before election
Iain Nicolson
SNP
Council Leader after election
Iain Nicolson
SNP

The 2022 Renfrewshire Council elections took place on 5 May 2022, as part of the 2022 Scottish local elections on the same day as the 31 other Scottish local authorities were up for election. The election used the 12 wards created under the Local Governance (Scotland) Act 2004 and last changed as a result of the 2015–16 Boundary Commission review, with 43 councillors being elected to Renfrewshire Council. Each ward elected either 3 or 4 members, using the STV electoral system.

At the last election in 2017, the SNP won the most seats and formed a minority administration taking over from the previous Labour majority administration. This election saw the SNP grow their number of seats to 21, one short of a majority, along with seats gains by Labour to bring them up to 15. The Conservatives lost seats, reducing their representation to 5. Liberal Democrats retained their single seat and Independents on the council were reduced to also a single seat.

== Background ==
=== Retiring councillors ===
Ward	Party	Retiring councillor
Renfrew North and Braehead	Conservative	Jane Strang
Renfrew North and Braehead	Labour	Bill Brown
Paisley Northeast and Ralston	Labour	Jim Sharkey
Paisley Northwest	Labour	Karen Kennedy
Paisley Northwest	Conservative	John McIntyre
Paisley Southwest	Liberal Democrats	Eileen McCartin
Johnstone South and Elderslie	Conservative	Alistair MacKay
Johnstone North, Kilbarchan, Howwood and Lochwinnoch	Conservative	Bill Binks
Houston, Crosslee and Linwood	Labour	Jim Sheridan
Bishopton, Bridge of Weir and Langbank	SNP	Natalie Don
Erskine and Inchinnan	Labour	Jim Harte
Erskine and Inchinnan	Conservative	Tom Begg

== Results ==
2022 Renfrewshire Council election
Party	Seats	Gains	Losses	Net gain/loss	Seats %	Votes %	Votes	+/−
SNP	21	2	0	▲2	48.84	41.72	25,624	▲4.09
Labour	15	3	1	▲2	34.88	32.34	19,860	▲4.12
Conservative	5	0	3	▼3	11.63	16.28	9,999	▼4.76
Liberal Democrats	1	0	0	0	2.33	3.86	2,371	▼0.28
Independent	1	0	1	▼1	2.33	3.65	2,240	▼1.67
Green	0	-	-	-	-	1.55	949	▼1.71
Scottish Family	0	-	-	-	-	0.30	187	New
Alba	0	-	-	-	-	0.09	53	New
TUSC	0	-	-	-	-	0.07	46	▼0.07
Scottish Libertarian	0	-	-	-	-	0.07	45	New
Scottish Socialist	0	-	-	-	-	0.07	44	▼0.13
Total	43	Electorate: 141,764	Turnout: 62,973 (44.4%)	Total valid: 61,418	100.00		-	

Note: "Votes" are the first preference votes. The net gain/loss and percentage changes relate to the result of the previous Scottish local elections on 5 May 2017. This may differ from other published sources showing gain/loss relative to seats held at dissolution of council.

== Ward results ==
=== Renfrew North and Braehead ===
- 2017: 2xSNP; 1xLab; 1xCon
- 2022: 2xSNP; 1xLab; 1xCon
- 2017-2022 Change: No Change

Renfrew North and Braehead - 4 seats
Party	Candidate	FPv%	Count						
Party	Candidate	FPv%	1	2	3	4	5	6	7
SNP	Lisa-Marie Hughes (incumbent)	24.48	1,376						
SNP	John Shaw (incumbent)	24.44	1,374						
Labour	Jamie McGuire	24.39	1,371						
Conservative	John Gray	15.96	897	903.56	914.62	933.28	940.64	1,007.17	1,305.47
Labour	Sophia Daphne Rose Dowling Sparks	5.18	291	351.56	406.83	603.13	630.38	795.03	
Liberal Democrats	Ross Stalker	4.50	253	289.30	325.18	335.41	357.95		
Independent	Peter Morton	1.05	59	72.68	86.09	88.24			
Electorate: 13,717 Valid: 5,621 Spoilt: 215 Quota: 1,125 Turnout: 42.5%

=== Renfrew South and Gallowhill ===
- 2017: 2xSNP; 1xLab;
- 2022: 2xSNP; 1xLab;
- 2017-2022 Change: No Change

Renfrew South and Gallowhill - 3 seats
Party	Candidate	FPv%	Count	
Party	Candidate	FPv%	1	2
SNP	Cathy McEwan (incumbent)	30.02	1,129	
Labour	Edward Grady (incumbent)	26.27	1,003	
SNP	Jim Paterson (incumbent)	22.39	842	1,007.18
Conservative	Dale Nelson	11.56	446	449.00
Labour	Kate Hughes	9.07	341	350.49
Electorate: 9,357 Valid: 3,761 Spoilt: 93 Quota: 941 Turnout: 41.2%

=== Paisley Northeast and Ralston ===
- 2017: 1xSNP; 1xLab; 1xCon
- 2022: 1xSNP; 1xLab; 1xCon
- 2017-2022 Change: No Change

Paisley Northeast and Ralston - 3 seats
Party	Candidate	FPv%	Count			
Party	Candidate	FPv%	1	2	3	4
SNP	Jennifer Adam-McGregor (incumbent)	40.23	1,843			
Labour	Graeme Clark	33.97	1,556			
Conservative	Neill Graham (incumbent)	19.84	909	943.79	1,033.64	1,429.46
Liberal Democrats	Alan McInnes	5.96	273	626.98	818.01	
Electorate: 9,141 Valid: 4,581 Spoilt: 70 Quota: 1,146 Turnout: 50.9%

=== Paisley Northwest ===
- 2017: 2xSNP; 1xLab; 1xCon
- 2022: 2xSNP; 2xLab;
- 2017-2022 Change: Labour gain one seat from Conservative

Paisley Northwest - 4 seats
Party	Candidate	FPv%	Count										
Party	Candidate	FPv%	1	2	3	4	5	6	7	8	9	10	11
SNP	Kenny MacLaren (incumbent)	27.31	1,305										
Labour	Janis McDonald	17.83	852	860.29	885.96	898.48	901.57	918.00	956.15				
SNP	Mags MacLaren (incumbent)	17.81	851	1,151.32									
Labour	Ben Smith	14.21	679	684.62	697.96	697.96	703.26	708.87	723.88	723.99	764.21	892.17	1,089.34
Conservative	Fraser Paul	9.27	443	443.27	444.69	444.69	444.74	453.74	477.58	477.59	503.07	515.67	
Green	Cara Rae	4.77	228	243.24	314.99	322.85	338.29	343.92	360.82	360.83	391.98		
Liberal Democrats	Mark Bailey	2.68	128	129.34	135.28	138.49	140.70	150.14					
Independent	John McIntyre (incumbent)	2.49	119	121.94	131.11	141.64	156.68	176.20	191.82				
Scottish Family	Rosa Grieve	1.57	75	75.80	78.99	82.25	88.81						
Alba	Samuel Oludare Yerokun	1.11	53	54.87	63.85	66.11							
TUSC	Jim Halfpenny	0.96	46	46.80	50.90								
Electorate: 13,728 Valid: 4,779 Spoilt: 177 Quota: 956 Turnout: 36.1%

=== Paisley East and Central ===
- 2017: 2xSNP; 1xLab
- 2022: 2xSNP; 1xLab
- 2017-2022 Change: No change

Paisley East and Central - 3 seats
Party	Candidate	FPv%	Count					
Party	Candidate	FPv%	1	2	3	4	5	6
SNP	John McNaughtan (incumbent)	32.41	1,241					
Labour	Carolann Davidson (incumbent)	27.16	1,040					
SNP	Will Mylet (incumbent)	12.69	486	730.91	734.23	742.23	918.86	1,011.63
Conservative	John Cameron	10.92	418	418.91	421.99	433.14	456.76	561.64
Labour	Jonathan Smith	7.99	306	312.61	377.34	384.50	445.77	
Green	Athol Bond	7.65	293	310.33	314.27	322.51		
Scottish Libertarian	Duncan Grant	1.18	45	45.68	46.31			
Electorate: 10,103 Valid: 3,829 Spoilt: 144 Quota: 958 Turnout: 39.3%

=== Paisley Southeast ===
- 2017: 1xSNP; 1xLab; 1xIndependent
- 2022: 2xSNP; 1xLab;
- 2017-2022 Change: SNP gain one seat from Independent

Paisley Southeast - 3 seats
Party	Candidate	FPv%	Count								
Party	Candidate	FPv%	1	2	3	4	5	6	7	8	9
SNP	Bruce MacFarlane	21.13	862	862.00	871.00	938.00	959.00	967.96	1,036.62		
Labour	Eddie Devine (incumbent)	19.61	800	805.00	836.00	857.00	1,093.00				
SNP	Marie McGurk (incumbent)	16.99	693	700.00	705.00	777.00	799.00	805.26	875.85	888.21	956.10
Conservative	Jim McIlroy	12.16	496	498.00	527.00	531.00	576.00	587.07	702.32	702.44	
Independent	Paul Mack (incumbent)	11.08	452	459.00	470.00	491.00	526.00	533.84			
Labour	Stuart Alexander McAusland	9.44	385	389.00	415.00	429.00					
Green	David Richard Laffan	4.75	194	208.00	227.00						
Liberal Democrats	Allan Heron	3.77	154	157.00							
Scottish Socialist	Sandra Amelia Webster	1.08	44								
Electorate: 9,546 Valid: 4,080 Spoilt: 105 Quota: 1,021 Turnout: 43.8%

=== Paisley Southwest ===
- 2017: 2xSNP; 1xLab; 1xLib Dem
- 2022: 2xSNP; 1xLab; 1xLib Dem
- 2017-2022 Change: No Change

Paisley Southwest - 4 seats
Party	Candidate	FPv%	Count					
Party	Candidate	FPv%	1	2	3	4	5	6
Labour	Kevin Montgomery (incumbent)	26.29	1,384					
SNP	Stephen Burns (incumbent)	24.47	1,288					
SNP	Lorraine Cameron (incumbent)	21.28	1,120					
Liberal Democrats	Anne Hannigan	14.32	754	863.54	921.19	939.55	963.67	1,055.80
Conservative	Marc Schmitz	9.95	524	567.29	570.39	571.23	586.74	616.32
Independent	Richard Vassie	2.05	108	134.79	149.93	156.87	226.04	
Independent	Scott Kerr	1.63	86	105.13	135.97	143.09		
Electorate: 11,998 Valid: 5,264 Spoilt: 135 Quota: 1,053 Turnout: 45.0%

=== Johnstone South and Elderslie ===
- 2017: 2xSNP; 1xLab; 1xCon
- 2022: 2xSNP; 2xLab;
- 2017-2022 Change: Labour gain one seat from Conservative.

Johnstone South and Elderslie - 4 seats
Party	Candidate	FPv%	Count			
Party	Candidate	FPv%	1	2	3	4
SNP	Jacqueline Cameron (incumbent)	29.00	1,613			
Labour	John Hood (incumbent)	23.55	1,310			
Labour	Iain McMillian	22.83	1,270			
SNP	Andy Steel (incumbent)	11.40	634	1,077.58	1,105.10	1,129.82
Conservative	Brian Jackson	10.70	595	599.65	636.19	663.39
Liberal Democrats	Robert MacIntyre	2.53	141	151.85	190.65	217.72
Electorate: 13,298 Valid: 5,563 Spoilt: 160 Quota: 1,113 Turnout: 43.0%

=== Johnstone North, Kilbarchan, Howwood and Lochwinnoch ===
- 2017: 1xLab; 1xSNP; 1xCon; 1xIndependent
- 2022: 2xLab; 1xSNP; 1xIndependent
- 2017-2022 Change: Labour gain one seat from Conservative

Johnstone North, Kilbarchan, Howwood and Lochwinnoch - 4 seats
Party	Candidate	FPv%	Count							
Party	Candidate	FPv%	1	2	3	4	5	6	7	8
Independent	Andy Doig (incumbent)	24.33	1,416							
SNP	Emma Rodden (incumbent)	20.87	1,215							
Labour	Chris Gilmour	16.63	968	1,017.81	1,018.47	1,036.12	1,056.76	1,242.80		
Labour	Gillian Graham	11.84	689	723.39	724.42	749.07	788.30	934.89	1,000.20	1,264.60
Conservative	Louise Reid	10.79	628	667.70	667.91	686.57	696.70			
SNP	Graeme Stockton	9.99	582	625.07	668.53	673.28	811.35	826.95	828.79	
Green	Heather Hudson	4.02	234	262.36	265.28	280.16				
Liberal Democrats	Andrew Jackson	1.53	89	107.43	107.60					
Electorate: 11,956 Valid: 5,821 Spoilt: 136 Quota: 1,165 Turnout: 49.8%

=== Houston, Crosslee and Linwood ===
- 2017: 2xLab; 1xSNP; 1xCon
- 2022: 2xSNP; 1xLab; 1xCon
- 2017-2022 Change: SNP gain one seat from Labour.

Houston, Crosslee and Linwood - 4 seats
Party	Candidate	FPv%	Count				
Party	Candidate	FPv%	1	2	3	4	5
Labour	Alison Ann-Dowling (incumbent)	27.96	1,568				
Conservative	David McGonigle	23.78	1,334				
SNP	Audrey Doig (incumbent)	20.89	1,172				
SNP	Robert Innes	18.19	1,020	1,033.08	1,038.17	1,082.71	1,381.70
Labour	Connor Cunningham	9.18	515	909.22	1,030.16	1,032.33	
Electorate: 12,758 Valid: 5,609 Spoilt: 143 Quota: 1,122 Turnout: 45.1%

=== Bishopton, Bridge of Weir and Langbank ===
- 2017: 1xCon; 1xSNP; 1xLab
- 2022: 1xCon; 1xSNP; 1xLab
- 2017-2022 Change: No change

Bishopton, Bridge of Weir and Langbank - 3 seats
Party	Candidate	FPv%	Count				
Party	Candidate	FPv%	1	2	3	4	5
SNP	Fiona Airlie-Nicolson	36.31	2,384				
Labour	Colin McCulloch (incumbent)	23.37	1,534	1,821.27			
Conservative	James MacLaren (incumbent)	20.61	1,353	1,381.32	1,404.97	1,573.57	2,514.06
Conservative	Mark Dougan	13.74	902	915.38	928.24	1,029.96	
Liberal Democrats	Grant Toghill	5.97	392	579.37	676.96		
Electorate: 13,065 Valid: 6,565 Spoilt: 71 Quota: 1,642 Turnout: 50.8%

=== Erskine and Inchinnan ===
- 2017: 2xSNP; 1xLab; 1xCon
- 2022: 2xSNP; 1xLab; 1xCon
- 2017-2022 Change: No change

Erskine and Inchinnan - 4 seats
Party	Candidate	FPv%	Count	
Party	Candidate	FPv%	1	2
Labour	Sam Mullin	33.61	1,998	
SNP	Iain Nicolson (incumbent)	23.23	1,381	
SNP	Michelle Campbell (incumbent)	20.40	1,213	
Conservative	Alec Leishman	17.73	1,054	1,236.79
Liberal Democrats	Alan Jelfs	3.15	187	442.58
Scottish Family	Robert Irwin	1.88	112	167.00
Electorate: 13,097 Valid: 5,945 Spoilt: 106 Quota: 1,190 Turnout: 46.2%

== Changes since election ==
November 2022

- At the start of the month Paisley Southeast Labour Cllr and former Labour Group Leader, Eddie Devine, left the party over "backstabbing that’s been going on in the past year or so" in the Labour group.
- Halfway through the month, veteran Johnstone South and Elderslie Labour Cllr, John Hood, left the party over becoming "disillusioned" with his party. Hood stated his party "doesn't want him"

June 2024

- At the end of the month, Paisley East and Central SNP Cllr, Will Mylet, left the party accusing the Renfrewshire Council's leader of trying to "ridicule and subdue" him.

February 2025

- Halfway through the month, Erskine and Inchinnan Conservative Cllr, Alec Leishman, defected to Reform UK to become the first councillor for the party.

March 2025

- At the start of the month, Renfrew North and Braehead Conservative Cllr, John Gray, became the second councillor to defect to Reform UK.

== Notes ==
1. HCL: Sitting councillor for Houston, Crosslee and Linwood.
