= Renfrewshire West and Levern Valley =

Constituency of the Scottish Parliament

- County constituency for the Scottish Parliament
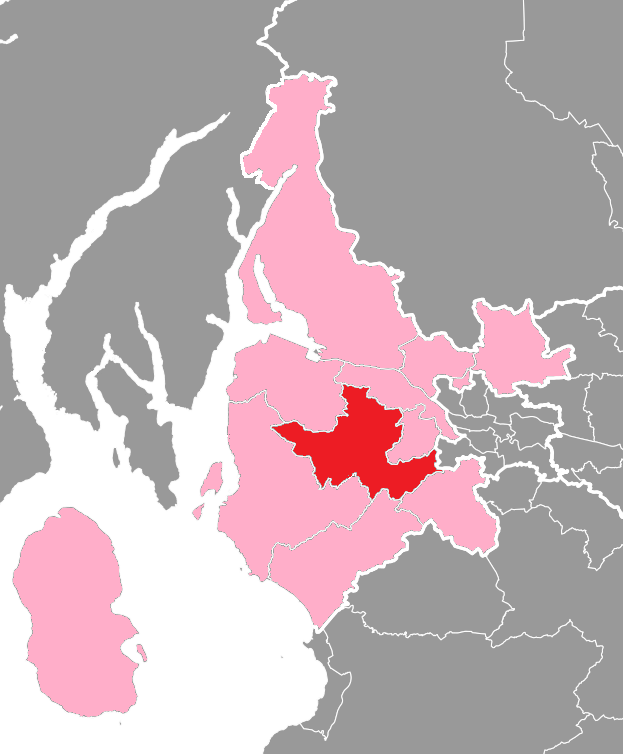

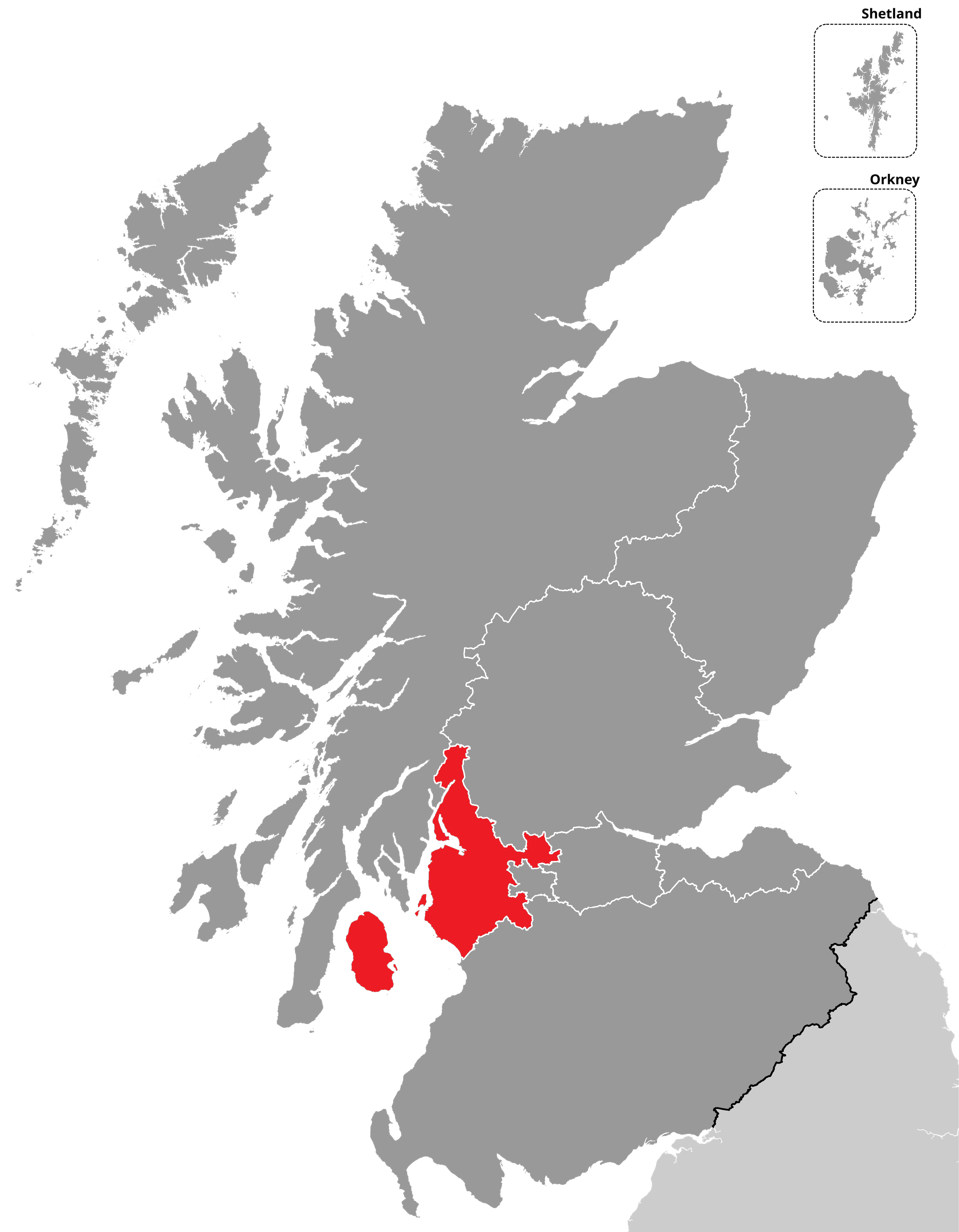
- Renfrewshire West and Levern Valley shown within the West Scotland electoral region and the region shown within Scotland
- Electoral region: West Scotland
- Electorate: 63,548 (2026)
- Major settlements: Johnstone, Barrhead

Current constituency
- Created: 2026
- Party: Scottish National Party
- MSP: Tom Arthur
- Council area: Renfrewshire; East Renfrewshire
- Created from: Renfrewshire South, Renfrewshire North and West, Paisley

Renfrewshire West and Levern Valley is a county constituency of the Scottish Parliament covering parts of the council areas of Renfrewshire and East Renfrewshire. Under the additional-member electoral system used for elections to the Scottish Parliament, it elects one Member of the Scottish Parliament (MSP) by the first past the post method of election. It is also one of ten constituencies in the West Scotland electoral region, which elects seven additional members, in addition to the ten constituency MSPs, to produce a form of proportional representation for the region as a whole.

The seat was created for the 2026 Scottish Parliament election, mostly replacing the abolished Renfrewshire South constituency. It also includes some areas from the abolished Renfrewshire North and West and redrawn Paisley constituencies. At the 2026 election, the previous SNP MSP for Renfrewshire South, Tom Arthur, was elected as its first representative.

== Electoral region ==
The other nine constituencies of the West Scotland region are: Cunninghame North, Cunninghame South, Clydebank and Milngavie, Dumbarton, Eastwood, Inverclyde, Paisley, Renfrewshire North and Cardonald, and Strathkelvin and Bearsden. The region covers the whole of the council areas of East Dunbartonshire, East Renfrewshire, Inverclyde, North Ayrshire, Renfrewshire, and West Dunbartonshire; and parts of the council areas of Argyll and Bute, East Ayrshire, and Glasgow.

== Boundaries ==
The constituency covers a wide area lying to the south and west of Paisley, containing settlements from both the Renfrewshire and East Renfrewshire council areas. The largest settlements are the towns of Johnstone, Barrhead and Linwood; the seat also covers the villages of Elderslie, Neilston, Houston, Bridge of Weir, Lochwinnoch, Howwood, Brookfield and Uplawmoor. The constituency is formed of the following electoral wards of Renfrewshire Council and East Renfrewshire Council:

- East Renfrewshire:
  - Barrhead, Liboside and Uplawmoor (entire ward)
  - Newton Mearns North and Neilston (shared with Eastwood)
- Renfrewshire:
  - Johnstone North, Kilbarchan, Howwood and Lochwinnoch (entire ward)
  - Johnstone South and Elderslie (entire ward)
  - Houston, Crosslee and Linwood (entire ward)
  - Bishopton, Bridge of Weir and Langbank (shared with Renfrewshire North and Cardonald)

== Member of the Scottish Parliament ==
Election	Member	Party
2026	Tom Arthur	SNP

== Election results ==
=== 2020s ===
2026 Scottish Parliament election: Renfrewshire West and Levern Valley (Note: Note that changes in vote share are shown with respect to the notional result of the 2021 election, calculated to account for boundary changes)
Party	Candidate	Constituency			Regional		
Party	Candidate	Votes	%	±%	Votes	%	±%
SNP	Tom Arthur (Note: Incumbent member for the Renfrewshire South constituency)	13,819	40.4	▼9.1	9,786	28.5	
Labour Co-op	Paul O'Kane (Note: Incumbent member on the party list, or for another constituency)	10,548	30.8	▲0.7	7,959	23.2	
Reform	Jamie McGuire	5,844	17.1	New	6,113	17.8	
Green					4,224	12.3	
Conservative	Farooq Choudhry	2,016	5.9	▼10.0	2,778	8.1	
Liberal Democrats	Ross Stalker	1,610	4.7	▲2.3	1,452	4.2	
Independent Green Voice					300	0.9	
AtLS					279	0.8	
Socialist Labour					276	0.8	
Scottish Family					238	0.7	
Liberal					177	0.5	
ISP					172	0.5	
ADF	Ken Thomson	374	1.1	New	146	0.4	
Scottish Socialist					110	0.3	
Independent	William Wallace				110	0.3	
Independent	Paul Mack				48	0.1	
UKIP					37	0.1	
Independent	Paddy McCarthy				34	0.1	
Scottish Common Party					24	0.1	
Scottish Libertarian					16	0.0	
Majority		3,271	9.6				
Valid votes		34,211			34,279		
Invalid votes		182			118		
Turnout		34,393	54.1		34,397	54.1	
SNP win (new boundaries)							

=== Bibliography ===
- "Second Review of Scottish Parliament Boundaries: Report to Scottish Ministers" (PDF). Boundaries Scotland. April 2025.

== See also ==
- List of Scottish Parliament constituencies and electoral regions (2026–)
