= 1999 Renfrewshire Council election =

Election to determine the members of the Renfrewshire Council

Elections to Renfrewshire Council were held on 6 May 1999, as part of the 1999 Scottish local elections, alongside elections to the Scottish Parliament. This was the second election following the local government reforms in 1994 and the first following the Third Statutory Reviews of Electoral Arrangements since the previous election.

== Election results ==
Renfrewshire local election result 1999
Party	Seats	Gains	Losses	Net gain/loss	Seats %	Votes %	Votes	+/−
Labour	21					41.9		▼3.8
SNP	15					37.6		▼1.4
Liberal Democrats	3					7.9		▲1.9
Conservative	1					10.7		▲2.8
Scottish Socialist	0							
Independent	0							

== Ward results ==
=== Arkleston & Newmains ===
Arkleston & Newmains
Party	Candidate	Votes	%	±%
Labour	R. McGerty*	1,184	56.1	
SNP	R. Brothers	926	43.9	
Majority			12.2	
Turnout			62.3	
Registered electors		3,388		
Labour hold				

== See also ==
- Renfrewshire Council elections
