= Minister for Parliamentary Business & Veterans =

Portfolio in the Scottish Government

- Scottish Gaelic: Ministear airson Gnothaichean na Pàrlamaid

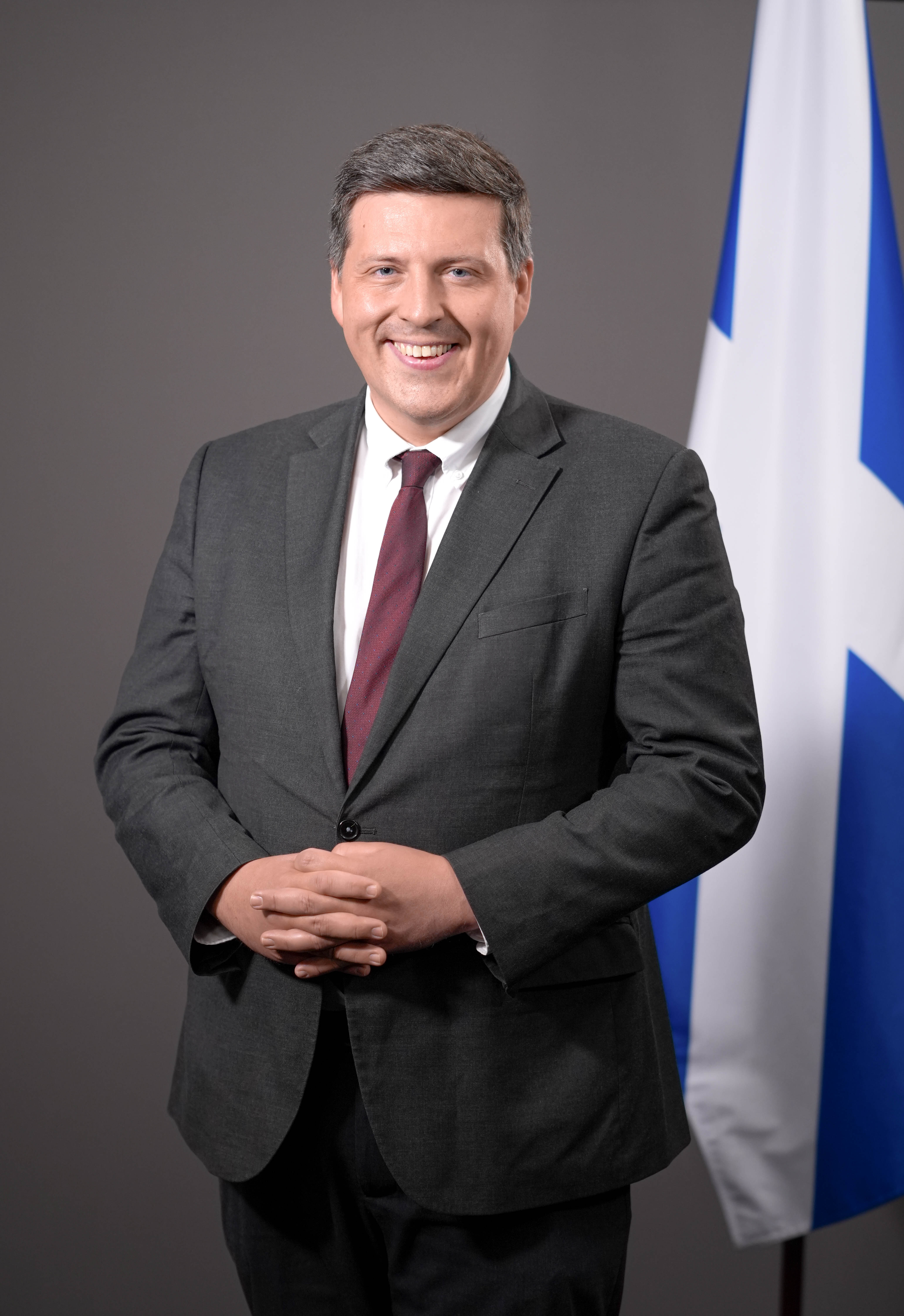
- Incumbent; Jamie Hepburn since 21 May 2026
- Style: Minister (within parliament); Parliamentary Business Minister (informal); Scottish Parliamentary Business Minister (outwith Scotland)
- Member of: Scottish Parliament; Scottish Government
- Reports to: Scottish Parliament
- Seat: Edinburgh
- Appointer: First Minister
- Inaugural holder: Tom McCabe (Government Business Manager and Chief Whip)
- Formation: 19 May 1999
- Salary: £106,185 per annum (2024) (including £72,196 MSP salary)
- Website: www.gov.scot

The Minister for Parliamentary Business & Veterans (Scottish Gaelic: Ministear a’ Chaibineit agus Gnothaichean na Pàrlamaid) is a junior ministerial post in the Scottish Government. The minister supports the First Minister and attends cabinet. The minister has the job of steering government business through the Scottish Parliament.

The current Minister for Parliamentary Business & Veterans is Jamie Hepburn, who was appointed on 20 May 2026.

== History ==
The post was originally created in May 1999 as Chief Whip and Government Business Manager as a cabinet position in the Labour Liberal Scottish Executive along with the junior Deputy Business Manager, both positions were renamed after a few weeks to the Minister for Parliament and Deputy Minister for Parliament respectively. The posts were renamed again in November 2001 to Minister for Parliamentary Business and Deputy Minister for Parliamentary Business following the election of Jack McConnell as First Minister.

The cabinet post was downgraded to that of a junior minister reporting to the First Minister following the election of an SNP minority government in May 2007. The post remained a junior one until the May 2011 Scottish Parliament election after which a new cabinet post of Cabinet Secretary for Parliamentary Business and Government Strategy was established with the Minister for Parliamentary Business and Chief Whip reporting to it. This set up remained in place until a government reshuffle in September 2012 saw the cabinet post abolished with responsibility of Government Strategy being given to the Deputy First Minister, and the post of Minister for Parliamentary Business being re-established reporting to both First Minister and Deputy First Minister.

This changed in the reshuffle announced on 21 November 2014, with Joe FitzPatrick reporting directly to Deputy First Minister of Scotland, John Swinney. In the June 2018 reshuffle cabinet level responsibility for parliamentary business was assigned to the Cabinet Secretary for Government Business and Constitutional Relations, who is supported by the Minister for Parliamentary Business and Veterans.

In May 2021, following the Nicola Sturgeon's SNP victory, George Adam was promoted to Minister for Parliamentary Business, with the post losing responsibility of veteran affairs.

== List of office holders ==
=== Cabinet position ===
==== Government Business Manager and Chief Whip ====
Name	Portrait	Entered office	Left office	Party	First Minister
Tom McCabe		19 May 1999	12 June 1999	Labour Party	Donald Dewar
==== Minister for Parliament ====
Tom McCabe		12 June 1999	27 November 2001	Labour Party	Donald Dewar; Henry McLeish
==== Minister for Parliamentary Business ====
Patricia Ferguson		27 November 2001	4 October 2004	Labour Party	Jack McConnell
Margaret Curran		4 October 2004	17 May 2007	Labour Party	Jack McConnell
==== Cabinet Secretary for Parliamentary Business and Government Strategy ====
Bruce Crawford		19 May 2011	5 September 2012	Scottish National Party	Alex Salmond
==== Cabinet Secretary for Government Business and Constitutional Relations ====
Michael Russell		26 June 2018	17 February 2020	Scottish National Party	Nicola Sturgeon

=== Junior Minister ===
==== Deputy Business Manager and Liberal Democrat Whip ====
Name	Portrait	Entered office	Left office	Party	First Minister
Iain Smith		19 May 1999	12 June 1999	Scottish Liberal Democrats	Donald Dewar
==== Deputy Minister for Parliament ====
Iain Smith		12 June 1999	1 November 2000	Scottish Liberal Democrats	Henry McLeish
Tavish Scott		1 November 2000	9 March 2001	Scottish Liberal Democrats	Henry McLeish
Euan Robson		9 March 2001	28 November 2001	Scottish Liberal Democrats	Henry McLeish
==== Deputy Minister for Parliamentary Business ====
Euan Robson		28 November 2001	21 May 2003	Scottish Liberal Democrats	Jack McConnell
Tavish Scott		21 May 2003	29 June 2005	Scottish Liberal Democrats	Jack McConnell
George Lyon		29 June 2005	16 May 2007	Scottish Liberal Democrats	Jack McConnell
==== Minister for Parliamentary Business ====
Bruce Crawford		17 May 2007	19 May 2011	Scottish National Party	Alex Salmond
==== Minister for Parliamentary Business and Chief Whip ====
Brian Adam		19 May 2011	5 September 2012	Scottish National Party	Alex Salmond
==== Minister for Parliamentary Business ====
Joe FitzPatrick		5 September 2012	28 June 2018	Scottish National Party	Alex Salmond
==== Minister for Parliamentary Business and Veterans ====
Graeme Dey		28 June 2018	20 May 2021	Scottish National Party	Nicola Sturgeon
==== Minister for Parliamentary Business ====
George Adam		20 May 2021	29 March 2023	Scottish National Party	Nicola Sturgeon
==== Minister for Cabinet and Parliamentary Business ====
George Adam		29 March 2023	20 June 2023	Scottish National Party	Humza Yousaf
==== Minister for Parliamentary Business ====
George Adam		20 June 2023	8 May 2024	Scottish National Party	Humza Yousaf
Jamie Hepburn		8 May 2024	19 September 2025	Scottish National Party	John Swinney
Graeme Dey		21 September 2025	20 May 2026	Scottish National Party	John Swinney
==== Minister for Parliamentary Business & Veterans ====
Jamie Hepburn		21 May 2026	Incumbent	Scottish National Party	John Swinney

== See also ==
- Scottish Parliament
- Scottish Government
