= Derek Mackay =

Former Scottish politician (born 1977)

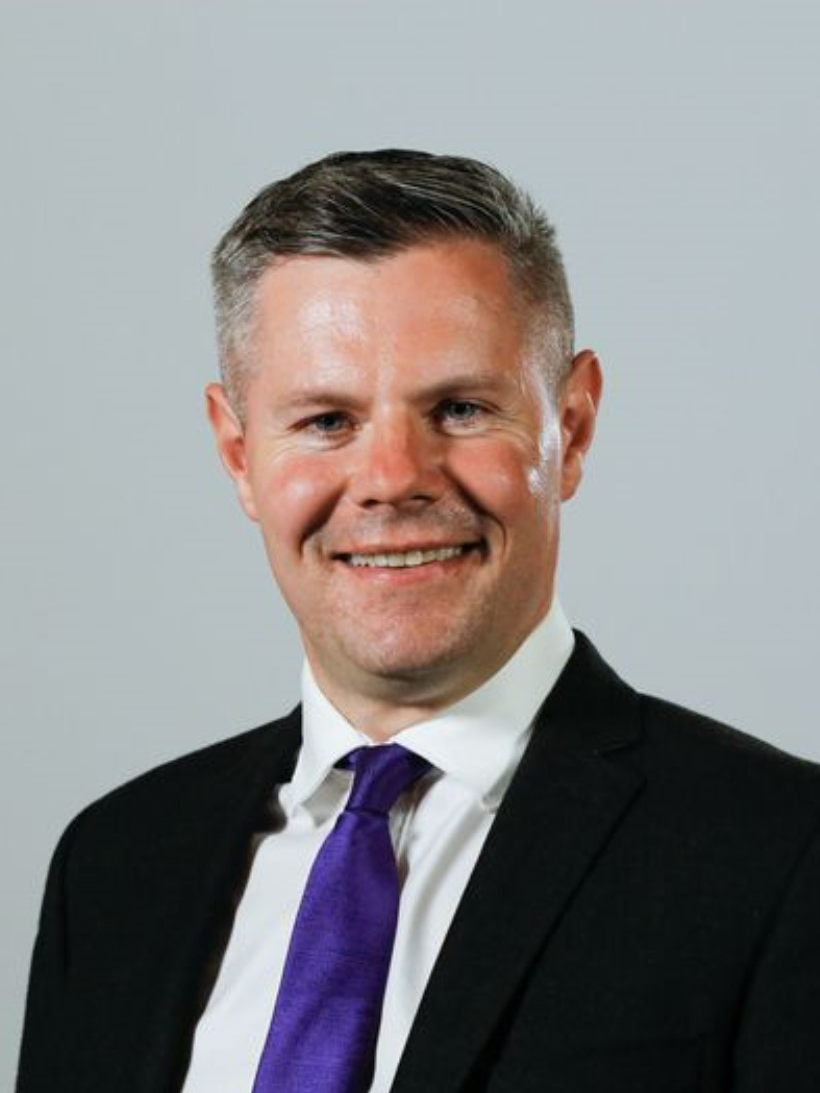
- Official portrait, 2018

Cabinet Secretary for Finance, Economy and Fair Work
- In office 26 June 2018 – 6 February 2020
- First Minister: Nicola Sturgeon
- Deputy: Kate Forbes
- Preceded by: Himself (Finance); Keith Brown (Economy, Jobs and Fair Work)
- Succeeded by: Kate Forbes (Finance); Fiona Hyslop (Economy, Fair Work and Culture)

Cabinet Secretary for Finance and the Constitution
- In office 18 May 2016 – 26 June 2018
- First Minister: Nicola Sturgeon
- Preceded by: John Swinney
- Succeeded by: Himself (Finance); Michael Russell (Constitution)
Junior ministerial offices
Minister for Transport and Islands
In office 21 November 2014 – 18 May 2016
First Minister	Nicola Sturgeon
Preceded by	Keith Brown
Succeeded by	Humza Yousaf
Minister for Local Government and Planning
In office 7 December 2011 – 21 November 2014
First Minister	Alex Salmond
Preceded by	Aileen Campbell
Succeeded by	Marco Biagi
Further offices held
Chairman and Business Convener of the Scottish National Party
In office 18 June 2011 – October 2018
Leader	Alex Salmond; Nicola Sturgeon
Preceded by	Bruce Crawford
Succeeded by	Kirsten Oswald
Member of the Scottish Parliament for Renfrewshire North and West
In office 5 May 2011 – 5 May 2021
Preceded by	Constituency established
Succeeded by	Natalie Don-Innes

Personal details
- Born: Derek John Mackay; 1977 (age 48–49) Paisley, Scotland
- Party: Independent (from 2020); SNP (until 2020)
- Children: 2

Derek Mackay (born 1977) is a former Scottish politician who served as Cabinet Secretary for Finance, Economy and Fair Work from 2016 to 2020. A former member of the Scottish National Party (SNP), he was Member of the Scottish Parliament (MSP) for Renfrewshire North and West from 2011 to 2021. Mackay served as a government minister from 2011 to 2020 under the administrations of Alex Salmond and Nicola Sturgeon.

Raised in Renfrewshire, he was elected to Renfrewshire Council in 1999 and was Leader of the Council from 2007 to 2011. Elected to the Scottish Parliament at the 2011 Scottish Parliament election, he served as Minister for Transport and Islands from 2011 to 2014 and Minister for Local Government and Planning from 2014 to 2016, as well as Chairman and Business Convener of the Scottish National Party from 2011 to 2018.

Mackay became Cabinet Secretary for Finance and the Constitution in 2016, succeeding Deputy First Minister John Swinney. In 2018, during a Cabinet reshuffle, Mackay's post was enlarged, absorbing the responsibilities of the previous role of Cabinet Secretary for Economy, Jobs and Fair Work to become Cabinet Secretary for Finance, Economy and Fair Work. In February 2020, he resigned as Finance Secretary after the Scottish Sun reported he had messaged a 16-year-old boy on social media, describing the boy as "cute" and offering to meet with him. He was also suspended from the SNP and sat as an independent MSP for the remainder of the 2016 parliamentary term, which ended on 25 March 2021.

== Early life ==
Mackay was born in Paisley, Renfrewshire, as the eldest of three children. His father was a violent alcoholic. In Mackay's early teens, he fled from his father with his mother and younger brother, becoming briefly homeless. He was educated at Kirklandneuk Primary School and Renfrew High School. MacKay became the first in his family to attend university, studying social work at the University of Glasgow, however, he later dropped out to pursue a career in politics.

He joined the Scottish National Party (SNP) at 16 and was involved in both the youth, where he served as National Convener from 1998–2002, and student movements.

== Political career ==
Mackay was first elected as a councillor in 1999, representing the Blythswood Ward on Renfrewshire Council. He was re-elected in 2003 and 2007 (for the new multi-member ward of Renfrew North in the latter) and became leader of Renfrewshire Council in May 2007, taking the SNP from opposition to lead the administration for the first time.

He became a national figure in local government, leading the SNP group in the Convention of Scottish Local Authorities (COSLA) from 2009 to 2011. He coordinated the SNP campaign in the 2012 Scottish local government elections and the 2017 general election.

At the 2011 election, Mackay was adopted for the new constituency of Renfrewshire North and West while also being placed third on the SNP regional list for West Scotland region. Upon his election as the constituency MSP for Renfrewshire North and West, he was placed on the Finance Committee and also appointed as the SNP's Business Convener and Parliamentary Liaison Officer to the Cabinet Secretary for Parliamentary Business and Government Strategy Bruce Crawford MSP.

Following a mini-reshuffle Mackay replaced Aileen Campbell as Minister for Local Government and Planning on 7 December 2011. When Nicola Sturgeon became First Minister of Scotland he was appointed as Minister for Transport and Islands.

Following the Scottish Parliament election in 2016, Mackay was promoted to the Scottish Cabinet to serve as Cabinet Secretary for Finance and the Constitution. After a reshuffle in June 2018, Economy and Fair Work was added to his portfolio.

In June 2011, Mackay was appointed as the SNP's Business Convener (party chair), succeeding Bruce Crawford. The Business Convener is responsible for chairing the SNP's Party Conference and the National Executive Committee; overseeing the party's management, administration and operations, as well as the coordination of election campaigns; working with the Chief Executive of Headquarters in setting priorities. Mackay stepped down from the role in October 2018.

=== Resignation ===
On 5 February 2020, the Scottish Sun alerted the office of Nicola Sturgeon about a story they were planning to run revealing Mackay had sent a 16-year-old boy messages via Facebook and Instagram in which he described the boy as "cute" and offered to meet up with the boy in person. The paper told the BBC they had been approached by the boy's mother who had become aware of the messages in the week prior.

The Scottish Government was accused of trying to stop publication of the Scottish Sun article, questioning the "justification" of intruding into Mackay's private life and claiming the Scottish Sun had a “moral obligation" to share the material in order for them "to offer any form of substantive response or view". The paper defended its position, stating that Alan Muir, its Scottish editor, had read out the "most significant and damaging messages" to Sturgeon’s office in two 15-minute phone conversations.

On 6 February, Mackay resigned hours before the Scottish budget was due to be announced. Sturgeon announced he had been suspended from the SNP and she had accepted his resignation, recognising his "significant contribution to government" but admitting his behaviour "failed to meet the standards required". Scottish Conservative acting leader Jackson Carlaw suggested the messages could "constitute the grooming of a young individual" and called for Mackay to resign from the Scottish Parliament.

On 8 February, Police Scotland said that it had spoken to the schoolboy and that while it had not "received any complaint of criminality", it was "assessing available information". It subsequently announced that it had reviewed the case and that Mackay would not face any charges, as no laws had been broken, with 16 being the age of consent in Scotland.

Mackay sat as an Independent for the rest of 2016–2021 parliament term and stood down as an MSP when it ended on 5 May 2021.

== Personal life ==
Mackay came out as gay in 2013 and separated from his wife. They have two sons together.

Mackay lives in Bishopton, Renfrewshire, near Glasgow, with his partner. He is involved with the Paisley Fairtrade Partnership, and is a member of CND and Amnesty International. He was the Honorary Vice President of the Battalion for Paisley and District Boys' Brigade, until being sacked from the position following his resignation scandal.

In February 2020, it was reported by a former senior SNP staff member that Nicola Sturgeon had banned Mackay from drinking at SNP conferences, because of reports around his behaviour. Mackay joked to attendees at the 2017 party conference that they would not see him in the pub afterwards as, "Nicola won't let me".

Scottish Parliament
New constituency	Member of the Scottish Parliament for Renfrewshire North and West; 2011–2021	Succeeded by Natalie Don
Political offices
Preceded by John Swinney as Cabinet Secretary for Finance, Constitution and Economy	Cabinet Secretary for Finance, Economy and Fair Work; 2016–2020	Succeeded by Kate Forbes as Cabinet Secretary for Finance
