= Natalie Don-Innes =

Former Scottish Children, Young People & the Promise Minister

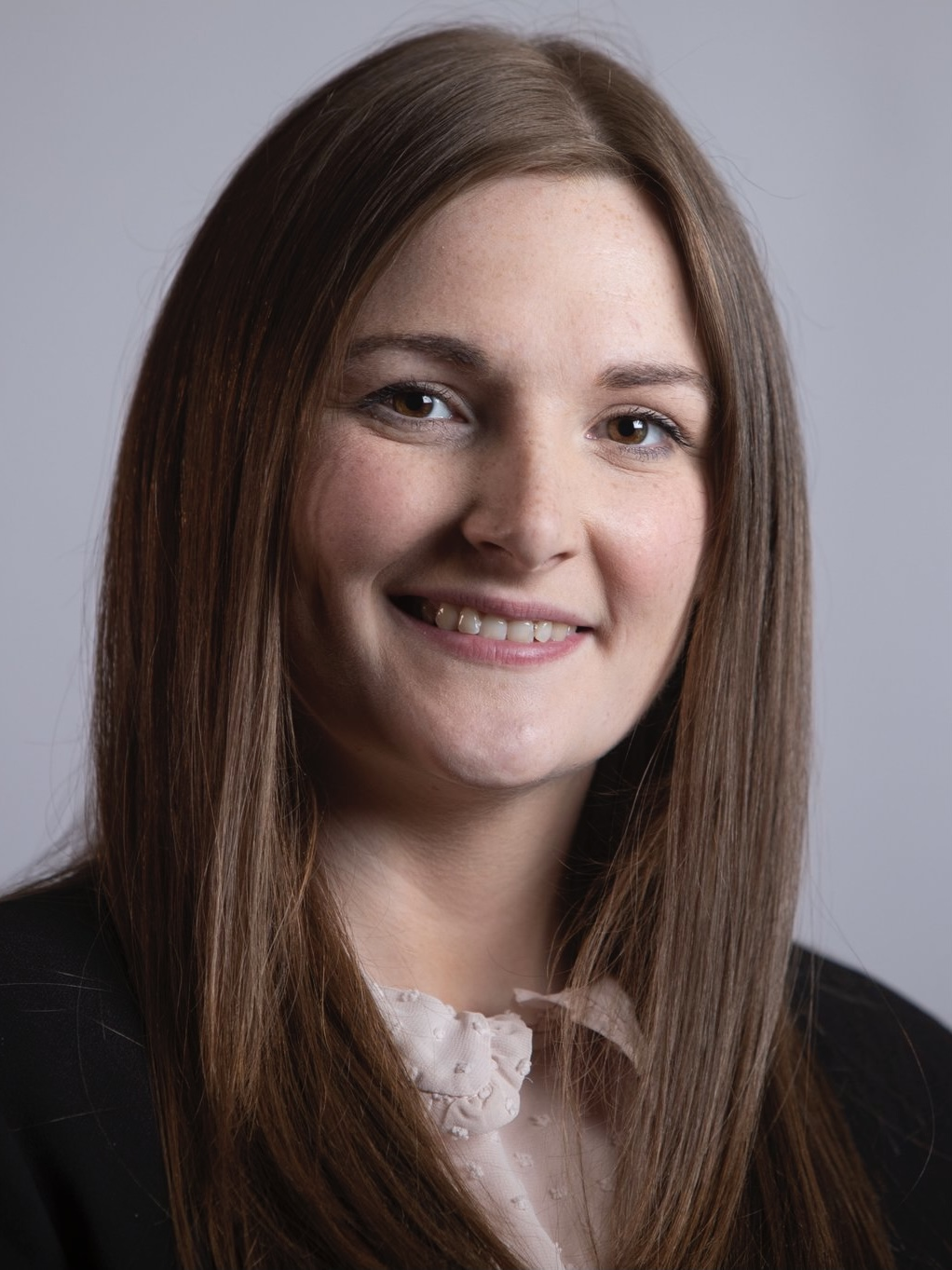
- Official portrait, 2021

Minister for Children, Young People and the Promise (Note: As Minister for Children, Young People and Keeping the Promise from 29 March 2023 to May 2024.)
- In office 29 March 2023 – 20 May 2026
- First Minister: Humza Yousaf; John Swinney
- Preceded by: Clare Haughey
- Succeeded by: Siobhian Brown

Member of the Scottish Parliament for Renfrewshire North and West
- In office 6 May 2021 – 9 April 2026
- Preceded by: Derek Mackay
- Succeeded by: Constituency Abolished

Personal details
- Born: 12 February 1989 (age 37) Paisley, Renfrewshire, Scotland
- Party: Scottish National Party
- Education: University of Glasgow
- Website: https://nataliedon.scot

Natalie Don-Innes (born 12 February 1989) is a Scottish National Party (SNP) politician who served as the Member of the Scottish Parliament (MSP) for Renfrewshire North and West from 2021 to 2026.

She served as the Minister for Children, Young People and the Promise from 2023 until 2026.

== Early life ==
Don-Innes is from Renfrewshire and was raised in a council house by a single mother, following the death of her father when she was young. She holds a university degree in history from the University of Glasgow.

== Political career ==
Don-Innes continued to serve as a local councillor for the Bishopton, Bridge of Weir and Langbank ward after having been elected in the 2017 Renfrewshire Council election.

She was selected as the SNP's candidate for the Renfrewshire North and West constituency in November 2020 for the 2021 Scottish Parliament election, following a tight second vote by party members after the first vote had resulted in a tie with fellow Renfrewshire councillor Michelle Campbell. Don-Innes was subsequently elected as MSP for the constituency with a 46.3% vote share and majority of 7,307 (19.1%) votes. She stood down as a councillor at the 2022 local council elections in Scotland. In 2023, she was appointed to the Yousaf government as Minister for Children, Young People and Keeping the Promise.

On 13 March 2024, she announced that she would not seek re-election, stating it was the right decision for her family. She left office on 9 April 2026 at the dissolution of the Scottish Parliament ahead of the 2026 election.

== Personal life ==
Don-Innes lives in the Renfrewshire village of Bridge of Weir and has two children. She is a fan of video games.

Scottish Parliament
Preceded by Derek Mackay	Member of the Scottish Parliament for Renfrewshire North and West; 2021 – 2026	Seat abolished
