= Renfrewshire North and West =

Region or constituency of the Scottish Parliament

- Former county constituency for the Scottish Parliament

- Renfrewshire North and West shown within the West Scotland electoral region, and the region shown within Scotland
- Population: 66,270 (2019)

Former constituency
- Created: 2011
- Abolished: 2026
- Council area: Renfrewshire; Inverclyde
- Created from: West Renfrewshire; Paisley North
- Replaced by: Renfrewshire North and Cardonald, Inverclyde, Paisley, and Renfrewshire West and Levern Valley

Renfrewshire North and West was a county constituency of the Scottish Parliament. Under the additional-member system used for elections to the Scottish Parliament, the seat elected one Member of the Scottish Parliament (MSP) by the plurality (first past the post) method of election, and was also one of ten constituencies in the West Scotland electoral region, which elected seven additional members, in addition to the nine constituency MSPs, to produce a form of proportional representation for the region as a whole. It was created ahead of the 2011 Scottish Parliament election, as a result of the first periodic review of Scottish Parliament boundaries, covering areas that were formerly in the constituencies of West Renfrewshire and Paisley North, both of which were abolished at this review.

Following the second periodic review of Scottish Parliament boundaries, Renfrewshire North and West was abolished ahead of the 2026 Scottish Parliament election. The bulk of the area formed the basis of new constituency of Renfrewshire North and Cardonald, although parts were also transferred to the constituencies of Inverclyde, Paisley, and Renfrewshire West and Levern Valley.

== Electoral region ==
During the period Renfrewshire North and West was in existence, the other nine constituencies of the West Scotland region were: Clydebank and Milngavie, Cunninghame North, Cunninghame South, Dumbarton, Eastwood, Greenock and Inverclyde, Paisley, Renfrewshire South and Strathkelvin and Bearsden. During this period, the region covered all of the East Dunbartonshire, the East Renfrewshire, the Inverclyde, North Ayrshire, Renfrewshire, and West Dunbartonshire council areas, and part of the Argyll and Bute council area.

== Constituency boundaries and council area ==
Map of boundaries from 2011

During the period Renfrewshire North and West was in existence, Renfrewshire was represented in the Scottish Parliament by three constituencies: Paisley, Renfrewshire North and West, and Renfrewshire South.

The Renfrewshire North and West constituency overlapped with the Inverclyde council area. When created in 2011 it was defined using the following electoral wards:

- Renfrewshire Council wards:
  - Renfrew North and Braehead (entire ward)
  - Renfrew South and Gallowhill (entire ward)
  - Bishopton, Bridge of Weir and Langbank (entire ward)
  - Erskine and Inchinnan (entire ward)
  - Paisley Northwest (shared with Paisley constituency)
  - Houston, Crosslee and Linwood (shared with Renfrewshire South constituency)
- Inverclyde Council wards:
  - Inverclyde East (shared with Greenock and Inverclyde constituency)

== Constituency profile ==
The constituency covered the area on the south bank of the River Clyde including and to the west of the historic burgh of Renfrew. Besides Renfrew, other settlements in the constituency included Bishopton, Bridge of Weir, Erskine and Kilmacolm. Bishopton was the site of a major munitions factory, ROF Bishopton, which hasd since begun to be redeveloped for housing. The constituency also included the large shopping centre and leisure facilities of Braehead, near Renfrew, and Glasgow Airport.

== Member of the Scottish Parliament ==
Election	Member	Party
Constituency created from: West Renfrewshire
2011	Derek Mackay	SNP
2020	Derek Mackay	Independent
2021	Natalie Don-Innes	SNP

== Elections ==
=== 2020s ===
2021 Scottish Parliament election: Renfrewshire North and West
Party	Candidate	Constituency			Regional		
Party	Candidate	Votes	%	±%	Votes	%	±%
SNP	Natalie Don	17,704	46.3	▼1.5	15,023	39.2	▼3.8
Labour	Johanna Baxter	10,397	27.2	▲3.7	8,664	22.6	▲1.4
Conservative	Julie Pirone	8,734	22.8	▼1.0	9,394	24.5	0.0
Green					2,513	6.5	▲1.6
Liberal Democrats	Ross Stalker	993	2.6	▼0.3	1,003	2.6	▲0.2
Alba					489	1.3	New
All for Unity					345	0.9	New
Scottish Family	Marty Bell	410	1.1	New	285	0.7	New
Independent Green Voice					209	0.5	New
Abolish the Scottish Parliament					102	0.3	New
Freedom Alliance (UK)					82	0.2	New
Reform					55	0.1	New
TUSC					54	0.1	New
Scottish Libertarian					51	0.1	▼0.1
UKIP					44	0.1	▼1.9
Scotia Future					18	0.047	New
Independent	James Morrison				17	0.044	New
Renew					13	0.034	New
Independent	Maurice Campbell				11	0.029	New
Majority		7,307	19.1	▼4.9			
Valid votes		38,238			38,372		
Invalid votes		129			62		
Turnout		38,367	67.9	▲6.8	38,372	68.1	▲7.0
SNP hold		Swing					

=== 2010s ===
2016 Scottish Parliament election: Renfrewshire North and West
Party	Candidate	Constituency			Regional		
Party	Candidate	Votes	%	±%	Votes	%	±%
SNP	Derek Mackay (Note: Incumbent member for this constituency)	14,718	47.8	▲5.9	13,246	43.0	▲1.4
Conservative	David Wilson	7,345	23.8	▲3.8	7,560	24.5	▲9.3
Labour	Mary Fee (Note: Incumbent member on the party list, or for another constituency)	7,244	23.5	▼12.7	6,530	21.2	▼11.3
Green					1,496	4.9	▲2.3
Liberal Democrats	Rod Ackland	888	2.9	▲0.9	737	2.4	▲0.4
UKIP					630	2.0	▲1.3
TUSC	Jim Halfpenny	414	1.3	New			
Scottish Christian					250	0.8	0.0
Solidarity					237	0.8	▲0.7
Independent	Peter Morton	198	0.6	New			
RISE					190	0.3	New
Scottish Libertarian					54	0.2	New
Majority		7,373	24.0	▲18.3			
Valid votes		30,807			30,830		
Invalid votes		63			34		
Turnout		30,870	61.1	▲4.9	30,864	61.1	▲4.9
SNP hold		Swing					
Notes

2011 Scottish Parliament election: Renfrewshire North and West
Party	Candidate	Constituency			Regional		
Party	Candidate	Votes	%	±%	Votes	%	±%
SNP	Derek Mackay	11,510	41.9	N/A	11,443	41.6	N/A
Labour	Stuart Clark	9,946	36.2	N/A	8,930	32.5	N/A
Conservative	Annabel Goldie (Note: Incumbent member on the party list, or for another constituency)	5,489	20.0	N/A	4,182	15.2	N/A
Green					712	2.6	N/A
Liberal Democrats	Andrew Page	550	2.0	N/A	563	2.0	N/A
All-Scotland Pensioners Party					439	1.6	N/A
Scottish Christian					228	0.8	N/A
BNP					215	0.8	N/A
Socialist Labour					188	0.7	N/A
UKIP					179	0.7	N/A
Scottish Socialist					121	0.4	N/A
Ban Bankers Bonuses					120	0.4	N/A
Pirate					79	0.3	N/A
Independent	Richard Vassie				50	0.2	N/A
Solidarity					40	0.1	N/A
Majority		1,564	5.7	N/A			
Valid votes		27,495			27,489		
Invalid votes		92			92		
Turnout		27,587	56.2	N/A	27,581	56.2	N/A
SNP win (new seat)							
