= 2017 Renfrewshire Council election =

Scottish local election

- 5 May 2017

All 43 seats to Renfrewshire Council 22 seats needed for a majority
- Turnout: 48.0% ▲5.5%
	First party	Second party	Third party
	SNP	Lab	Con
Leader	Iain Nicolson	Mark MacMillan (retiring)	James MacLaren
Party	SNP	Labour	Conservative
Leader's seat	Erskine and Inchinnan	Paisley Southwest	Bishopton, Bridge of Weir and Langbank
Last election	15 seats, 35.3%	22 seats, 47.6%	1 seat, 9.1%
Seats before	15	19	1
Seats won	19	13	8
Seat change	▲4	▼9	▲7
Popular vote	23,467	17,599	13,124
Percentage	37.6%	28.2%	21.0%
Swing	▲2.3%	▼19.4%	▲11.9%
	Fourth party	Fifth party
	LD	Ind
Leader	Eileen McCartin	N/A
Party	Liberal Democrats	Independent
Leader's seat	Paisley Southwest	N/A
Last election	1 seat, 4.4%	1
Seats before	1	3
Seats won	1	2
Seat change	Steady	▲1
Popular vote	2,580	3,319
Percentage	4.1%	5.3%
Swing	▼0.3	▲3.7%
Council Leader before election
Mark McMillan
Labour
Council Leader after election
Iain Nicolson
SNP

The 2017 Renfrewshire Council election took place on 4 May 2017 to elect members of Renfrewshire Council. The election was first to use the twelve wards created as a result of the 2015-16 Boundary Commission review, with each ward electing three or four Councillors using the single transferable vote system, a form of proportional representation, with 43 Councillors being elected, a net increase of 3 members compared to the 2012 Council.

== Election result ==
Renfrewshire local election result 2017
Party	Seats	Gains	Losses	Net gain/loss	Seats %	Votes %	Votes	+/−
SNP	19	6	2	+4	44.19	37.63	23,467	+2.33
Labour	13	1	10	-9	30.23	28.22	17,599	-19.38
Conservative	8	7	0	+7	18.6	21.04	13,124	+11.94
Liberal Democrats	1	0	0	0	2.33	4.14	2,580	-0.26
Independent	2	1	0	+1	4.65	5.32	3,319	+3.72
Green	0	-	-	-	-	3.26	2,030	New
Scottish Socialist	0	-	-	-	-	0.20	125	-1.00
TUSC	0	-	-	-	-	0.14	89	-0.60
UKIP	0	-	-	-	-	0.05	32	New

Note: "Votes" are the first preference votes. The net gain/loss and percentage changes relate to the result of the previous Scottish local elections on 3 May 2012. This may differ from other published sources showing gain/loss relative to seats held at dissolution of Scotland's councils.

== Ward results ==
=== Renfrew North and Braehead ===
- 2012: 2xLab; 1xSNP
- 2017: 2xSNP; 1xLab; 1xCon
- 2012-2017 Change: 1 additional seat compared to 2012. SNP gain one seat from Labour. Conservative gain extra seat.

Renfrew North and Braehead - 4 seats
Party	Candidate	FPv%	Count					
Party	Candidate	FPv%	1	2	3	4	5	6
SNP	John Shaw	24.63	1,335					
Labour	Bill Brown (incumbent)	20.37	1,104					
Conservative	Jane Strang	19.99	1,084	1,087.37				
SNP	Lisa-Marie Hughes	15.35	832	1,049.78	1,050.58	1,050.64	1,065.58	1,087.77
Labour	Alexander Murrin (incumbent)	11.9	645	652.68	667.86	668.52	696.99	736.99
Independent	Peter Morton	2.82	153	155.8	156.47	156.79	178.51	
Green	Nathalie Rosset	2.67	145	148.93	149.17	149.24	180.56	222.68
Liberal Democrats	Ross Stalker	2.27	123	125.62	126.03	126.48		
Electorate: TBC Valid: 5,421 Spoilt: 137 Quota: 1,085 Turnout: 5,558 (45.9%)

=== Renfrew South and Gallowhill ===
- 2012: 2xLab; 1xSNP
- 2017: 2xSNP; 1xLab
- 2012-2017 Change: SNP gain one seat from Labour

Renfrew South and Gallowhill - 3 seats
Party	Candidate	FPv%	Count						
Party	Candidate	FPv%	1	2	3	4	5	6	7
SNP	Cathy McEwan (incumbent)	26.98	1,079						
Conservative	Mark Dougan	17.88	715	715.51	717.51	735.58	774.73	825.09	
SNP	Jim Paterson (incumbent)	17.73	709	773.57	785.08	828.96	855.98	889.3	1,004.46
Labour	Edward Grady	17.70	708	712.32	717.39	727.39	1,238.56		
Labour	Margaret Devine (incumbent)	15.65	626	628.49	634.49	656.86			
Green	Graham Batin	2.85	114	115.61	130.76				
TUSC	Richard Neville	1.2	48	48.95					
Electorate: TBC Valid: 3,999 Spoilt: 106 Quota: 1,000 Turnout: 4,105 (44.2%)

=== Paisley Northeast and Ralston ===
- 2012: 2xLab; 2xSNP
- 2017: 1xCon; 1xLab; 1xSNP
- 2012-2017 Change (vs Paisley East and Ralston): 1 less seat compared to 2012. Conservative gain one seat from Labour. SNP lose additional seat.

Paisley Northeast and Ralston - 3 seats
Party	Candidate	FPv%	Count								
Party	Candidate	FPv%	1	2	3	4	5	6	7	8	9
Conservative	Neill Graham	22.7	1,091	1,091	1,095	1,099	1,103	1,311			
SNP	Jennifer Adam-McGregor	18.2	874	881	888	932	941	1,009	1,020.72	1,024.12	1,882.34
SNP	John Clark	17.9	862	863	865	899	905	946	958.89	964.13	
Labour	Jim Sharkey (incumbent)	17.4	835	839	845	871	1,167	1,311			
Liberal Democrats	Catriona Campbell	11.7	562	566	577	606	618				
Labour	Maureen Sharkey (incumbent)	6.6	316	316	318	339					
Green	Duncan Macintosh	3.53	170	185	201						
Independent	Billy Carlin	1.05	50	58							
Scottish Socialist	Lindsay Brown	0.92	44								
Electorate: TBC Valid: 4,804 Spoilt: 86 Quota: 1,202 Turnout: 4,890 (54.6%)

=== Paisley Northwest ===
- 2012: 2xLab; 2xSNP
- 2017: 2xSNP; 1xLab; 1xCon
- 2012-2017 Change: Conservative gain one seat from Labour

Paisley Northwest - 4 seats
Party	Candidate	FPv%	Count									
Party	Candidate	FPv%	1	2	3	4	5	6	7	8	9	10
SNP	Kenny MacLaren (incumbent)	26.8	1,303									
Labour	Karen Kennedy	17.48	850	859.12	870.43	877.63	901.29	924.09	971.21	1,065.92		
SNP	Mags MacLaren (incumbent)	16.68	811	1,100.22								
Conservative	John McIntyre	13.51	657	659.28	661.31	664.34	691.71	717.14	751.54	779.71	786.23	941.29
Labour	Tommy Williams (incumbent)	10.14	493	498.32	505.61	512.38	526.86	555.85	593.33	639.63	703.45	
No label	Andy Doyle	4.34	211	214.79	222.79	227.22	232.70	284.63				
Green	Beth Douglas	3.87	188	196.36	237.56	251.96	283.14	296.06	359.55			
Independent	John Goudie McIntyre	3.8	185	187.79	195.10	197.70	200.76					
Liberal Democrats	Jack Clark	2.53	123	124.52	128.06	130.18						
Scottish Socialist	Sandra Webster	0.86	42	42.51	48.83							
Electorate: TBC Valid: 4,863 Spoilt: 126 Quota: 973 Turnout: 4,989 (39.4%)

=== Paisley East and Central ===
- 2017: 2xSNP; 1xLab
- New ward

Paisley East and Central - 3 seats
Party	Candidate	FPv%	Count						
Party	Candidate	FPv%	1	2	3	4	5	6	7
SNP	John McNaughtan	26.51	1,007						
Labour	Carolann Davidson†††††	21.62	821	822.53	849.64	884.87	1,242.15		
Conservative	John Cameron	16.8	638	638.28	666.34	677.34	691.34	746.62	
SNP	Will Mylet (incumbent)	16.01	608	658.09	669.32	792.11	805.51	842.67	937.67
Labour	Stuart McAusland	10.82	411	411.85	417.91	438.97			
Green	Daniel Speirs	5.48	208	209.53	226.64				
Liberal Democrats	Samantha Allan	2.77	105	105.62					
Electorate: TBC Valid: 3,798 Spoilt: 87 Quota: 950 Turnout: 3,885 (42.6%)

=== Paisley Southeast ===
- 2012: 2xLab; 1xSNP; 1xIndependent
- 2017: 1xLab; 1xSNP; 1xIndependent
- 2012-2017 Change (vs Paisley South): 1 less seat compared to 2012. Labour lose seat.

Paisley Southeast - 3 seats
Party	Candidate	FPv%	Count								
Party	Candidate	FPv%	1	2	3	4	5	6	7	8	9
SNP	Marie McGurk (incumbent)	22.78	1,047	1,053	1,059	1,101	1,112	1,117.77	1,748.69		
Labour	Eddie Devine (incumbent)	21.95	1,009	1,009	1,031	1,048	1,207				
Conservative	Sheila Fulton	15.12	695	695	717	728	751	758.69	765.69	792.15	1,047
SNP	Janette Swanson	14.44	664	667	671	708	720	721.96			
Independent	Paul Mack (incumbent)††	14.09	648	649	666	687	730	738.53	765.69	950.59	1,248.79
Labour	Ben Smith	5.44	250	250	273	296					
Green	Emma McShane	3.39	156	157	171						
Liberal Democrats	Michael Wilson	2.48	114	115							
Scottish Socialist	John Miller	0.30	14								
Electorate: TBC Valid: 4,597 Spoilt: 92 Quota: 1,150 Turnout: 4,689 (50.7%)

=== Paisley Southwest ===
- 2012: 2xLab; 1xSNP; 1xLib Dem
- 2017: 2xSNP; 1xLab; 1xLib Dem
- 2012-2017 Change: SNP gain one seat from Labour

Paisley Southwest - 4 seats
Party	Candidate	FPv%	Count					
Party	Candidate	FPv%	1	2	3	4	5	6
Labour	Kevin Montgomery†††††	25.95	1,457					
Liberal Democrats	Eileen McCartin (incumbent)	17.69	993	1,091.11	1,149.57			
SNP	Lorraine Cameron (incumbent)	17.31	972	998.59	1,041.11	1,043.71	1,432.22	
Conservative	James Halpin	13.38	751	793.87	803.25	813.41	819.65	824.78
SNP	Stephen Burns	12.9	724	740.05	757.34	759.13	917.9	1,182.18
SNP	Brian McGuire	9.98	560	581.78	601.47	603.2		
Green	Sean Lafferty	2.8	157	184.05				
Electorate: TBC Valid: 5,614 Spoilt: 103 Quota: 1,123 Turnout: 5,717 (48.8%)

=== Johnstone South and Elderslie ===
- 2012: 3xLab; 1xSNP
- 2017: 2xSNP; 1xLab; 1xCon
- 2012-2017 Change: SNP & Conservative each gain one seat from Labour.

Johnstone South and Elderslie - 4 seats
Party	Candidate	FPv%	Count						
Party	Candidate	FPv%	1	2	3	4	5	6	7
Labour	John Hood (incumbent)	26.15	1,448						
SNP	Jacqueline Cameron	25.14	1,392						
Conservative	Alistair MacKay	17.37	962	978.67	982.34	995.75	1,151.48		
SNP	Andy Steel	11.63	644	659.73	907.41	973.39	1,052.27	1,054.46	1,235.16
No label	John Caldwell (incumbent)	8.94	495	512.84	518.35	542.7			
Labour	Thomas Dempster Wallace	8.02	444	682.79	687.28	726.79	867.85	883.07	
Green	Megan Tait	2.76	153	161.92	171.91				
Electorate: TBC Valid: 5,538 Spoilt: 167 Quota: 1,108 Turnout: 5,705 (45.5%)

=== Johnstone North, Kilbarchan, Howwood and Lochwinnoch ===
- 2012: 2xLab; 1xSNP
- 2017: 1xLab; 1xSNP; 1xCon; 1xIndependent
- 2012-2017 Change: 1 extra seat compared to 2012. Labour lose one seat to Conservative. Independent gain extra seat.

Johnstone North, Kilbarchan, Howwood and Lochwinnoch - 4 seats
Party	Candidate	FPv%	Count								
Party	Candidate	FPv%	1	2	3	4	5	6	7	8	9
Labour	Derek Bibby (incumbent)	19.75	1,204	1,207	1,209	1,228					
SNP	Emma Rodden	18.03	1,099	1,106	1,108	1,111	1,111.2	1,198.22	1,263.58		
Conservative	Bill Binks	17.42	1,062	1,062	1,082	1,099	1,099.5	1,107.5	1,204.19	1,204.6	1,232.8
Independent	Andy Doig (incumbent)†††	14.63	892	892	898	912	912.99	966.02	1,101.02	1,102.47	1,430.32
SNP	Graeme Ramsay Stockton	13.6	829	830	830	833	833.19	881.2	906.28	944.49	
Labour	Christopher Gilmour (incumbent)	10.06	613	616	616	621	626.13	657.2			
Green	Sarah Anderson	4.25	259	263	264	281	281.2				
Liberal Democrats	William Duff	1.35	82	83	83						
UKIP	Cheryl O'Brien	0.53	32	33							
Scottish Socialist	Geoff Knowles	0.41	25								
Electorate: TBC Valid: 6,095 Spoilt: 143 Quota: 1,220 Turnout: 6,238 (54.1%)

=== Houston, Crosslee and Linwood ===
- 2012: 2xLab; 2xSNP
- 2017: 2xLab; 1xSNP; 1xCon
- 2012-2017 Change: Conservative gain one seat from SNP.

Houston, Crosslee and Linwood - 4 seats
Party	Candidate	FPv%	Count					
Party	Candidate	FPv%	1	2	3	4	5	6
Conservative	Scott Kerr	27.96	1,574					
SNP	Audrey Doig (incumbent)	21.39	1,204					
Labour	Jim Sheridan†	16.61	935	993.78	996.21	1,023.71	1,078.51	1,221.98
Labour	Alison Dowling†††††	13.96	786	853.30	857.65	884.82	974.53	1,210.50
SNP	Robert Innes	13.75	774	787.63	848.89	928.70	954.76	
Green	Helen Speirs	3.46	195	221.41	224.99			
Liberal Democrats	Allan Heron	2.88	162	271.62	272.9	318.61		
Electorate: TBC Valid: 5,630 Spoilt: 112 Quota: 1,127 Turnout: 5,742 (48.1%)

=== Bishopton, Bridge of Weir and Langbank ===
- 2012: 1xLab; 1xCon; 1xSNP
- 2017: 1xCon; 1xSNP; 1xLab
- 2012-2017 Change: No change

Bishopton, Bridge of Weir and Langbank - 3 seats
Party	Candidate	FPv%	Count			
Party	Candidate	FPv%	1	2	3	4
Conservative	James MacLaren (incumbent)	45.47	2,552			
SNP	Natalie Don††††	31.77	1,783			
Labour	Colin McCulloch†††††	15.96	896	1,212.69	1,289	1,407.35
Liberal Democrats	Elliot Harrison	3.78	212	537.68	578.49	733.70
Green	Ellen Höfer-Franz	3.03	170	230.72	406.93	
Electorate: TBC Valid: 5,613 Spoilt: 44 Quota: 1,404 Turnout: 5,657 (55.1%)

=== Erskine and Inchinnan ===
- 2012: 2xLab; 2xSNP
- 2017: 2xSNP; 1xLab; 1xCon
- 2012-2017 Change: Conservative gain one seat from Labour

Erskine and Inchinnan - 4 seats
Party	Candidate	FPv%	Count							
Party	Candidate	FPv%	1	2	3	4	5	6	7	8
SNP	Iain Nicolson (incumbent)	22.54	1,441							
Conservative	Tom Begg	20.85	1,333							
Labour	Jim Harte (incumbent)††††††	14.45	924	928.05	936.11	947.19	973.08	994.73	1,173.1	1,910.16
SNP	Michelle Campbell	14.3	914	1,043.40	1,044.82	1,049.93	1,059.46	1,125.24	1,277.61	1,323.5
Labour	Sam Mullin (incumbent)	13.05	834	841.53	846.84	852.92	862.91	868.1	998.43	
Independent	Andy Cameron	10.75	687	693.86	706.34	711.65	743.08	771.94		
Green	Mairi Cranie	1.80	115	119.27	120.2	131.47	145.22			
Liberal Democrats	John Boyd	1.63	104	107.35	116.34	117.34				
TUSC	Jim Halfpenny	0.64	41	41.56	41.92					
Electorate: TBC Valid: 6,393 Spoilt: 136 Quota: 1,279 Turnout: 6,529 (49.4%)

== Changes since Election ==
- † In August 2018, Houston, Crosslee and Linwood Labour Cllr Jim Sheridan was suspended from the party following the discovery of anti-Semitic posts on Facebook. He was reinstated following an investigation in January 2019. In July 2021 he was suspended again. In March 2022 he resigned from the Labour party
- †† Paisley Southeast Cllr Paul Mack was disqualified from office by the Standards Commission for Scotland, with effect from 1 October 2020. A by-election was due to be held on 14 December 2021, however Paul Mack appealed the decision to the Court of Session. On 11 March 2022, the Court of Session ruled to the effect that Cllr Mack's disqualification was reduced to ten months, backdated to May 2021.
- ††† On 22 October 2020 Johnstone North, Kilbarchan, Howwood and Lochwinnoch Cllr Andy Doig joined the Scotia Future party.
- †††† Bishopton, Bridge of Weir and Langbank SNP Cllr Natalie Don was elected as a MSP for Renfrewshire North and West in the 2021 Scottish Parliament election.
- ††††† In December 2021 Councillors Dowling, Davidson, McCulloch and Montgomery were suspended from the Labour group, but this was overturned on 30 December.
- †††††† In March 2022 Councillor Jim Harte was suspended from the Labour group.
