= 2007 Renfrewshire Council election =

2007 Scottish local government election

- 3 May 2007

All 40 seats to Renfrewshire Council 21 seats needed for a majority

Results by ward.

Elections to Renfrewshire Council were held on 3 May 2007, the same day as the other Scottish local government elections and the Scottish Parliament general election. The election was the first one using 11 new wards created as a result of the Local Governance (Scotland) Act 2004, each ward will elect three or four councillors using the single transferable vote system form of proportional representation. The new wards replace 40 single-member wards which used the plurality (first past the post) system of election.

== Election results ==
Renfrewshire local election result 2007
Party	Seats	Gains	Losses	Net gain/loss	Seats %	Votes %	Votes	+/−
Labour	17	N/A	N/A	-4	42.5	36.8	25,878	
SNP	17	N/A	N/A	+2	42.5	35.4	24,875	
Liberal Democrats	4	N/A	N/A	+1	10.0	9.7	6,831	
Conservative	2	N/A	N/A	+1	5.0	11.5	8,115	
Solidarity	0	N/A	N/A	±0	0.0	1.6	1,096	
Scottish Socialist	0	N/A	N/A	±0	0.0	1.2	840	
Green	0	N/A	N/A	±0	0.0	0.2	130	
Independent	0	N/A	N/A	0	0.0	3.6	2,508	

== Ward results ==
Renfrewshire council election, 2007: Renfrew North
Party	Candidate	FPv%	%	Seat	Count
SNP	Derek Mackay	1,549	30.9	1	1
Labour	Alexander Murrin	1,236	24.7	2	2
SNP	Bill Perrie	673	12.4	3	6
Labour	Donnie Smith	527	10.5		
Independent	Charlie Newlands	516	10.3		
Conservative	Ron Kane	286	5.7		
Liberal Democrats	Alan Jelfs	218	4.4		

Renfrewshire council election, 2007: Renfrew South and Gallowhill
Party	Candidate	FPv%	%	Seat	Count
Labour	Mary Fee	1,452	26.5	1	1
SNP	Cathy McEwan	1,339	24.4	2	4
Labour	Eddie Grady	896	16.3	3	8
SNP	David Mylet	748	13.6		
Independent	Tommy Dyer	294	5.4		
Conservative	Jim Foster	291	5.3		
Liberal Democrats	Angela McGarrigle	246	4.5		
Solidarity	Gillie MacDonald	127	2.3		
Scottish Socialist	Douglas Canning	90	1.6		

Renfrewshire council election, 2007: Paisley East and Ralston
Party	Candidate	FPv%	%	Seat	Count
Liberal Democrats	Susan McDonald	1,608	21.9	1	1
SNP	Brian Lawson	1,583	21.6	2	1
Labour	Rayleen Kelly	1,033	14.1		
Labour	Jim Sharkey	1,012	13.8	4	6
SNP	Celia Lawson	934	12.7	3	6
Conservative	Alistair Campbell	798	10.9		
Solidarity	Sean Hurl	199	2.7		
Scottish Socialist	Andy Bowden	170	2.3		

Renfrewshire council election, 2007: Paisley North West
Party	Candidate	FPv%	%	Seat	Count
Labour	Terry Kelly	1,671	28.5	1	1
SNP	Kenny McLaren	1,387	23.6	2	1
Labour	Tommy Williams	873	14.9	3	2
Conservative	Alison Cook	546	9.3		
Liberal Democrats	Mike Dillon††	506	8.6	4	8
SNP	Will Mylet	427	7.3		
Scottish Socialist	Iain Hogg	225	3.8		
Solidarity	Robert Muir	139	2.4		
Independent	Gordon Mackie	97	1.7		

Renfrewshire council election, 2007: Paisley South
Party	Candidate	FPv%	%	Seat	Count
Labour	Eddie Devine	1,508	20.4	1	1
SNP	George Adam	1,128	15.3	2	9
SNP	Jim Mitchell	976	13.2	4	9
Liberal Democrats	Marie McGurk†††	928	12.6	3	9
Labour	Roy Glen	822	11.1		
Independent	Caroline Martin	763	10.3		
Conservative	Ron Garrett	513	6.9		
Independent	Paul Mack	404	5.5		
Green	Kingsley Matthews	130	1.8		
Solidarity	Fiona MacDonald	104	1.4		
Independent	John Workman	63	0.9		
Scottish Socialist	John Miller	46	0.6		

Renfrewshire council election, 2007: Paisley South West
Party	Candidate	FPv%	%	Seat	Count
SNP	Lorraine Cameron	1,879	28.8	1	1
Labour	Jackie Green	1,363	20.9	2	1
Liberal Democrats	Eileen McCartin	1,263	19.3	3	3
Labour	Mark MacMillan	844	12.9	4	9
Conservative	Shiela Fulton	388	5.9		
SNP	David McCartney	290	4.4		
Liberal Democrats	Margaret McDonough	176	2.7		
Independent	Bob Sharkey	172	2.6		
Solidarity	Danny Williamson	108	1.7		
Scottish Socialist	Billy McNaughton	50	0.8		

Renfrewshire council election, 2007: Johnstone South, Elderslie and Howwood
Party	Candidate	FPv%	%	Seat	Count
Labour	John Caldwell	1,524	22.5	1	1
SNP	Tracie McGee	1,470	21.7	2	1
Labour	Iain McMillan	1,135	16.8	3	8
Labour	John Hood	742	11.0	4	8
Conservative	John McIntyre	571	8.4		
SNP	Andrew McNair	561	8.3		
Liberal Democrats	Alan Heron	376	5.6		
Independent	Paul Gibson	199	2.9		
Solidarity	Gerry Kavanagh	113	1.7		
Scottish Socialist	Gerry McCartney	83	1.2		

Renfrewshire council election, 2007: Johnstone North, Kilbarchan and Lochwinnoch
Party	Candidate	FPv%	%	Seat	Count
SNP	David Arthur	1,595	26.4	1	1
SNP	Bruce McFee	1,313	21.8	2	5
Labour	Neil Bibby	1,168	16.9	3	5
Labour	John Kenny	1,023	19.4		
Conservative	Tom Begg	568	9.4		
Liberal Democrats	David Jelfs	282	4.7		
Scottish Socialist	Geoff Knowles	87	1.4		

Renfrewshire council election, 2007: Houston, Crosslee and Linwood
Party	Candidate	FPv%	%	Seat	Count
Labour	Anne Hall	2,216	33.0	1	1
SNP	Audrey Doig	1,205	18.0	2	4
Conservative	David Clews†	1,174	17.5	3	4
SNP	Allan Noon	1,120	16.7	4	4
Labour	David Lavery	519	7.7		
Liberal Democrats	Sandra Jelfs	384	5.7		
Scottish Socialist	Stefan Kohlmorgen	89	1.3		

Renfrewshire council election, 2007: Bishopton, Bridge of Weir and Langbank
Party	Candidate	FPv%	%	Seat	Count
Conservative	Iain Langlands	2,077	36.3	1	1
SNP	Carol Puthucheary	1,375	24.0	2	2
Labour	Michael Holmes	1,113	19.5	3	5
SNP	Bill Robertson	714	12.5		
Liberal Democrats	Michael Hanley	360	6.3		
Solidarity	Harry Pfaff	83	1.5		

Renfrewshire council election, 2007: Erskine and Inchinnan
Party	Candidate	FPv%	%	Seat	Count
Labour	Jim Harte	1,963	26.5	1	1
SNP	James McQuade	1,369	18.5	3	5
SNP	Iain Nicolson	1,240	16.7	4	5
Labour	Sam Mullin	1,238	16.7	2	2
Conservative	Oonagh Harper	903	12.2		
Liberal Democrats	John Boyd	484	6.5		
Solidarity	Jim Halfpenny	223	3.0		

== Changes since 2007 Election ==
- †On 30 March 2011, Houston, Croslee and Linwood Cllr David Clews quit the Conservative Party and joined the Labour Party.
- ††In May 2011, Paisley North West Cllr Mike Dillon quit the Liberal Democrats and joined the Scottish National Party. He re-joined the Liberal Democrats on 29 September 2011.
- †††On 17 May 2011, Paisley South Cllr Marie McGurk quit the Liberal Democrats and joined the Scottish National Party.

== By-elections Since 2007 ==
- On 17 March 2011 Labour's Roy Glen won a by-election in Paisley South which was held to fill the vacancy that arose following the death of the SNP's Jim Mitchell.

Paisley South By-Election (17 March 2011) - 1 seat
Party	Candidate	FPv%	Count		
Party	Candidate	FPv%	1	2	3
Labour	Roy Glen	49.3	2,081	2,102	2,121
SNP	David McCartney	32.4	1,366	1,382	1,404
Conservative	Alison Cook	18.54	388	392	441
Independent	Gary Pearson	3.9	164	179	198
Liberal Democrats	Ross Stalker	3.2	134	139	
Scottish Socialist	Jimmy Kerr	1.9	82		
Labour gain from SNP		Swing			
Electorate: 13,951 Valid: 4,215 Spoilt: 31 Quota: 2,108 Turnout: 4,246 (30.4%)
