= Wards of Renfrewshire =

Electoral districts in Scotland

Map of Renfrewshire's 12 wards (post-2017 configuration)

Renfrewshire is one of the 32 council areas of Scotland (also known as local authorities or unitary authorities), formally established in 1996 to succeed the Renfrew district within the Strathclyde region, both of which were abolished; the headquarters are at Paisley.

The composition of the new bodies was decided in the Local Government etc. (Scotland) Act 1994 and elections were held nationwide in May 1995. Initially, councillors were elected via 40 individual wards each returning one member on a plurality (First-past-the-post) basis, which was the case in 1995, 1999 and 2003.

Under the Local Governance (Scotland) Act 2004, the election format was changed to a more proportional single transferable vote, with larger wards each electing three or four councillors (depending on population size), which in Renfrewshire resulted in the creation of 11 wards, still returning 40 councillors - the format used in the 2007 elections was repeated in 2012. A national review by Boundaries Scotland led to a re-arrangement in Renfrewshire, with three more councillors added, an additional new ward and adjustments for others, although some remained unchanged; this was put in place for the 2017 elections and used again in 2022 elections.

The current (post-2017) wards of Renfrewshire are summarised below (ordered as they are numbered by the council), with any changes since 2007 outlined (technically those which changed name and boundaries are new entities but in each case there is a clear continuity of members and territory).

== Renfrew North and Braehead ==
Location of the Renfrew North and Braehead ward

As its name suggests, its territory covers the northern parts of Renfrew, the northern boundary being the River Clyde. Created in 2007 as Renfrew North with three representatives, the boundary review prior to the 2017 election resulted in a minor addition – streets north of Porterfield Road – which, in combination with the building of several residential developments surrounding the Braehead retail and leisure complex, increased the population sufficiently to merit a fourth councillor; the name was also amended to Renfrew North and Braehead. In 2020, the ward population was 17,827.

=== Councillors ===
Election	Councillors			
2007	Derek Mackay (SNP)	Alexander Murrin (Labour)	Bill Perrie (SNP)	3 seats
2012	Bill Brown (Labour)	Alexander Murrin (Labour)	Bill Perrie (SNP)	3 seats
2017	Bill Brown (Labour)	Jane Strang (Conservative)	John Shaw (SNP)	Lisa-Marie Hughes (SNP)
2022	Jamie McGuire (Labour / Reform UK)	John Gray (Conservative / Reform UK)	John Shaw (SNP)	Lisa-Marie Hughes (SNP)
2025	Jamie McGuire (Labour / Reform UK)	John Gray (Conservative / Reform UK)	John Shaw (SNP)	Lisa-Marie Hughes (SNP)

== Renfrew South and Gallowhill ==
Location of the Renfrew South and Gallowhill ward

Renfrew South and Gallowhill returns three councillors and has existed since 2007. As its name suggests, its territory covers the southern half of the town of Renfrew and north-eastern parts of the larger town of Paisley between the White Cart Water and the Inverclyde Line railway tracks, primarily the Gallowhill housing scheme; the 2017 re-configuration was minor, with streets north of Porterfield Road removed. In 2020, the ward population was 12,232.

=== Councillors ===
Election	Councillors		
2007	Cathy McEwan (SNP)	Mary Fee (Labour)	Eddie Grady (Labour)
2012	Cathy McEwan (SNP)	Margaret Devine (Labour)	Eddie Grady (Labour)
2016	Cathy McEwan (SNP)	Margaret Devine (Labour)	Jim Paterson (SNP)
2017	Cathy McEwan (SNP)	Edward Grady (Labour)	Jim Paterson (SNP)
2022	Cathy McEwan (SNP)	Edward Grady (Labour)	Jim Paterson (SNP)

== Paisley Northeast and Ralston ==
Location of the Paisley Northeast and Ralston ward

Created in 2007 as Paisley East and Ralston with four representatives and territory including the parts of eastern Paisley between the Inverclyde Line railway tracks to the north and Barrhead Road / Hurlet Road (the A726) to the south, plus much of the town centre up to the line of Storie Street, the 2017 boundary review led to a large part of its territory (south of Seedhill Road and the Paisley Canal line railway tracks, plus the town centre territory west of Mill Street) being combined with part of the Paisley South ward to form an additional entity, Paisley East and Central, the existing wards losing one seat each. The 2017 definition includes the Ralston and Oldhall neighbourhoods up to the local authority border with Glasgow, plus Barshaw, Whitehaugh and Williamsburgh further into Paisley on either side of the A761 Glasgow Road, where St Mirin's Cathedral and Paisley Grammar School are both situated. In 2020, the ward population was 12,810.

=== Councillors ===
Election	Councillors			
2007	Jim Sharkey (Labour)	Brian Lawson (SNP)	Celia Lawson (SNP)	Susan McDonald (Lib Dem)
2012	Jim Sharkey (Labour)	Brian Lawson (SNP)	Will Mylet (SNP)	Maureen Sharkey (Labour)
2017	Jim Sharkey (Labour)	Jennifer Adam-McGregor (SNP)	Neill Graham (Conservative)	3 seats
2022	Graeme Clark (Labour)	Jennifer Adam-McGregor (SNP)	Neill Graham (Conservative)	3 seats

== Paisley Northwest ==
Location of the Paisley Northwest ward

Paisley Northwest was created in 2007 and elects four councillors. As its name suggests, it covers the north-western areas of Paisley including part of the town centre (west of the line of Storie Street / Canal Terrace) and the Castlehead, Ferguslie Park, Gockston, Maxwellton, Millarston and Shortroods neighbourhoods. Coats Memorial Church, Glasgow International Airport, Paisley Museum and Art Galleries, Paisley Sheriff Court, the Royal Alexandra Hospital, St Mirren Park football stadium and the main campus of the University of the West of Scotland also lie within the ward, the north-eastern boundary of which is the White Cart Water, the southern boundary along the course of the old Paisley Canal line and Potterhill branch railway tracks, and the eastern boundary Calside / Stanely Road.

The 2017 boundary review led to the removal of some territory to the west of the course of the former Paisley and Barrhead District Railway tracks at Barskiven Road to the Johnstone South and Elderslie ward, but with only a small reduction in population as most of the developed land comprises the non-residential Phoenix Retail Park and St James Business Park. In 2020, the population was 17,018.

=== Councillors ===
Election	Councillors			
2007	Kenny McLaren (SNP)	Terry Kelly (Labour)	Tommy Williams (Labour)	Mike Dillon (Lib Dem)
2012	Kenny McLaren (SNP)	Terry Kelly (Labour)	Tommy Williams (Labour)	Mags McLaren (SNP)
2017	Kenny McLaren (SNP)	Karen Kennedy (Labour)	John McIntyre (Conservative)	Mags McLaren (SNP)
2022	Kenny McLaren (SNP)	Janis McDonald (Labour)	Ben Smith (Labour)	Mags McLaren (SNP)

== Paisley East and Central ==
Location of the Paisley East and Central ward

Paisley East and Central was created in 2017 as the result of the boundary review, in which it was decided to remove part of the territory and one seat each from the existing four-member wards of Paisley East and Ralston (between Seedhill Road / the Paisley Canal line railway tracks and the A726 Barrhead Road – primarily Blackhall and Seedhill – as well as most of the town centre between the Inverclyde Line railway tracks to the north, the line of Storie Street to the west and Mill Street to the east) and Paisley South (between Rowan Street / Dykebar Hospital and Barrhead Road, i.e. the Charleston, Dykebar, Hawkhead and Hunterhill neighbourhoods) and form an additional ward. Landmarks within the ward include Paisley Abbey, Paisley Town Hall and the Russell Institute. In 2020, its population was 12,218.

=== Councillors ===
Election	Councillors		
2017	John McNaughtan (SNP)	Carolann Davidson (Labour)	Will Mylet (SNP / Ind.)
2022	John McNaughtan (SNP)	Carolann Davidson (Labour)	Will Mylet (SNP / Ind.)
2024	John McNaughtan (SNP)	Carolann Davidson (Labour)	Will Mylet (SNP / Ind.)

== Paisley Southeast ==
Location of the Paisley South ward

The ward was created as Paisley South in 2007 with four representatives and territory including almost all of south-eastern Paisley between Barrhead Road / Hurlet Road (the A726) to the north-east and Calside / Park Road / Stanely Road / Gleniffer Road (but not the Langcraigs neighbourhood) to the west. The 2017 boundary review led to part of its territory (between the A726 and Rowan Street / Dykebar Hospital, i.e. the Charleston, Dykebar, Hawkhead and Hunterhill neighbourhoods) being combined with part of the Paisley East and Ralston ward to form an additional entity, Paisley East and Central, the existing wards losing one seat each and being renamed. The 2017 definition of Paisley Southeast includes Carriagehill, Glenburn, Lochfield, Potterhill and Thornly Park; in 2020, the ward population was 12,925.

=== Councillors ===
Election	Councillors			
2007	Marie McGurk (Lib Dem) / (SNP)	George Adam (SNP)	Eddie Devine (Labour /Ind.)	Jim Mitchell (SNP)
2011	Marie McGurk (Lib Dem) / (SNP)	George Adam (SNP)	Eddie Devine (Labour /Ind.)	Roy Glen (Labour)
2012	Marie McGurk (Lib Dem) / (SNP)	Paul Mack (Ind.) (Note: Disqualified from office from October 2020, appealed successfully in March 2022.)	Eddie Devine (Labour /Ind.)	Roy Glen (Labour)
2017	Marie McGurk (Lib Dem) / (SNP)	Paul Mack (Ind.)	Eddie Devine (Labour /Ind.)	3 seats
2022	Marie McGurk (Lib Dem) / (SNP)	Bruce MacFarlane (SNP)	Eddie Devine (Labour /Ind.)	3 seats
2023	Marie McGurk (Lib Dem) / (SNP)	Bruce MacFarlane (SNP)	Eddie Devine (Labour /Ind.)	3 seats

== Paisley Southwest ==
Location of the Paisley Southwest ward

Paisley Southwest was created in 2007 and elects four councillors – it was unaffected by the 2017 boundary review.

As its name suggests, it covers the south-western areas of Paisley including Brediland, Durrockstock, Foxbar, Lounsdale, Meikleriggs and Stanely plus the Langcraigs neighbourhood (generally considered to be part of Glenburn), as well as most of the Gleniffer Braes Country Park on the high ground to the south of the town. Its northern boundary is along the course of the old Paisley Canal line and Potterhill branch railway tracks, and the eastern boundary along Stanely Road / Gleniffer Road to Glenburn Road, then east up to Langcraigs Drive; the south and west boundaries of the ward extend beyond the Paisley built-up area. In 2020, the population was 16,505.

=== Councillors ===
Election	Councillors			
2007	Lorraine Cameron (SNP)	Jackie Green (Labour)	Mark MacMillan (Labour)	Eileen McCartin (Liberal Democrats)
2012	Lorraine Cameron (SNP)	Jacqueline Henry (Labour)	Mark MacMillan (Labour)	Eileen McCartin (Liberal Democrats)
2017	Lorraine Cameron (SNP)	Kevin Montgomery (Labour)	Stephen Burns (SNP)	Eileen McCartin (Liberal Democrats)
2022	Lorraine Cameron (SNP)	Kevin Montgomery (Labour)	Stephen Burns (SNP)	Anne Hannigan (Liberal Democrats)

== Johnstone South and Elderslie ==
Location of the Johnstone South and Elderslie ward

Johnstone South and Elderslie elects four councillors and covers the southern half of the town of Johnstone including the neighbourhoods of Cochrane Castle, Corseford, Johnstone Castle, Quarrelton, Spateston and Thorn (the division being the Ayrshire Coast Line railway tracks) and the adjacent village of Elderslie. When the ward was created in 2007 it was named Johnstone South, Elderslie and Howwood and included the village of Howwood, but the 2017 boundary review removed Howwood (and the rural hinterland up to the local authority boundaries with East Renfrewshire and North Ayrshire) and assigned it to the Johnstone North, Kilbarchan and Lochwinnoch ward, both entities being renamed accordingly. Some territory was gained from the Paisley Northwest ward, namely streets west of the course of the former Paisley and Barrhead District Railway tracks at Barskiven Road, though most of the developed land comprises the non-residential Phoenix Retail Park and St James Business Park. In 2020, the ward's population was 15,860.

=== Councillors ===
Election	Councillors			
2007	John Hood (Labour /Ind.)	Iain McMillan (Labour)	John Caldwell (Labour)	Tracie McGee (SNP)
2012	John Hood (Labour /Ind.)	Iain McMillan (Labour)	John Caldwell (Labour)	Stephen McGee (SNP)
2017	John Hood (Labour /Ind.)	Andy Steel (SNP)	Alistair MacKay (Conservative)	Jacqueline Cameron (SNP)
2022	John Hood (Labour /Ind.)	Andy Steel (SNP)	Iain McMillan (Labour)	Jacqueline Cameron (SNP)
2022	John Hood (Labour /Ind.)	Andy Steel (SNP)	Iain McMillan (Labour)	Jacqueline Cameron (SNP)

== Johnstone North, Kilbarchan, Howwood and Lochwinnoch ==
Location of the Johnstone North, Kilbarchan, Howwood and Lochwinnoch ward

The ward was created as Johnstone North, Kilbarchan and Lochwinnoch in 2007, electing three councillors and covering the northern half of the town of Johnstone (including the town centre and the Cartside neighbourhood, the division being the Ayrshire Coast Line railway tracks) and the villages of Kilbarchan, and Lochwinnoch. Already consisting of a large rural hinterland up to the borders of North Ayrshire and Inverclyde local authorities to the west and north respectively, the boundary review in 2017 added the village of Howwood and its rural peripheries leading to East Renfrewshire from the existing Johnstone South, Elderslie and Howwood ward, both entities being renamed accordingly and Johnstone North gaining one further seat. In 2020, the Johnstone North, Kilbarchan, Howwood and Lochwinnoch ward's population was 14,740.

=== Councillors ===
Election	Councillors			
2007	Neil Bibby (Labour)	David Arthur (SNP)	Bruce McFee (SNP)	3 seats
2012	Christopher Gilmour (Labour)	Andy Doig (SNP) (Ind./ Scotia Future)	Derek Bibby (Labour)	3 seats
2017	Bill Binks (Conservative)	Andy Doig (SNP) (Ind./ Scotia Future)	Derek Bibby (Labour)	Emma Rodden (SNP)
2022	Christopher Gilmour (Labour)	Andy Doig (SNP) (Ind./ Scotia Future)	Gillian Graham (Labour)	Emma Rodden (SNP)

== Houston, Crosslee and Linwood ==
Location of the Houston, Crosslee and Linwood ward

Created in 2007, its territory – which was unaffected by the boundary review in 2017 – takes in the adjoining villages of Crosslee (and Craigends) and Houston, and the nearby small town of Linwood, as well as Brookfield. In 2020, the Houston, Crosslee and Linwood ward's population was 19,152.

=== Councillors ===
Election	Councillors			
2007	Audrey Doig (SNP)	Allan Noon (SNP)	Anne Hall (Labour)	David Clews (Conservative /Labour)
2011	Audrey Doig (SNP)	Allan Noon (SNP)	Anne Hall (Labour)	David Clews (Conservative /Labour)
2012	Audrey Doig (SNP)	Allan Noon (SNP)	Anne Hall (Labour)	Stuart Clark (Labour)
2017	Audrey Doig (SNP)	Scott Kerr (Conservative)	Alison Dowling (Labour)	Jim Sheridan (Labour/ Ind.)
2021	Audrey Doig (SNP)	Scott Kerr (Conservative)	Alison Dowling (Labour)	Jim Sheridan (Labour/ Ind.)
2022	Audrey Doig (SNP)	David McGonigle (Conservative)	Alison Dowling (Labour)	Robert Innes (SNP)

== Bishopton, Bridge of Weir and Langbank ==
Location of the Bishopton, Bridge of Weir and Langbank ward

Bishopton, Bridge of Weir and Langbank elects three councillors. Created in 2007, its territory – which was unaffected by the 2017 boundary review in 2017 – takes in the separate villages of Bishopton (including the modern development at Dargavel Village), Bridge of Weir and Langbank; its limitations include the border with Inverclyde local authority area to the west, the M8 and M898 motorways to the east, and the River Clyde to the north. In 2020, the ward's population was 10,040.

=== Councillors ===
Election	Councillors		
2007	Iain Langlands (Conservative)	Carol Puthucheary (SNP)	Michael Holmes (Labour)
2012	James MacLaren (Conservative)	Maria Brown (SNP)	Michael Holmes (Labour)
2017	James MacLaren (Conservative)	Natalie Don (SNP)	Colin McCulloch (Labour)
2022	James MacLaren (Conservative)	Fiona Airlie-Nicolson (SNP)	Colin McCulloch (Labour)

== Erskine and Inchinnan ==
Location of the Erskine and Inchinnan ward

Erskine and Inchinnan elects four councillors. Created in 2007, its territory – which was unaffected by the boundary review in 2017 – contains the town of Erskine and adjacent village of Inchinnan; its limitations include the M8 and M898 motorways to the west, the River Clyde to the north, the River Cart to the east and its tributary the Black Cart Water to the south. In 2020, the ward's population was 18,063.

=== Councillors ===
Election	Councillors			
2007	Jim Harte (Labour)	Sam Mullin (Labour)	James McQuade (SNP)	Iain Nicolson (SNP)
2012	Jim Harte (Labour)	Sam Mullin (Labour)	James McQuade (SNP)	Iain Nicolson (SNP)
2017	Jim Harte (Labour)	Tom Begg (Conservative)	Michelle Campbell (SNP)	Iain Nicolson (SNP)
2022	Sam Mullin (Labour)	Alec Leishman (Conservative / Reform UK)	Michelle Campbell (SNP)	Iain Nicolson (SNP)
2025	Sam Mullin (Labour)	Alec Leishman (Conservative / Reform UK)	Michelle Campbell (SNP)	Iain Nicolson (SNP)
