= Renfrewshire Council =

Unitary authority in Renfrewshire, Scotland

Renfrewshire Council Comhairle Siorrachd Rinn Friù
- Coat of arms

- Council logo

Leadership
- Provost: Lorraine Cameron, SNP since 18 May 2017
- Leader: Iain Nicolson, SNP since 18 May 2017
- Chief Executive: Alan Russell since November 2021

Structure
- Seats: 43 councillors
- Graph of the party split among 45 seats.
- Political groups: Administration (20) SNP (20) Other parties (25) Labour (12) Conservative (5) Reform (3) Liberal Democrats (1) Independent (4)

Elections
- Voting system: Single transferable vote
- Last election: 6 May 2022
- Next election: 6 May 2027

Meeting place
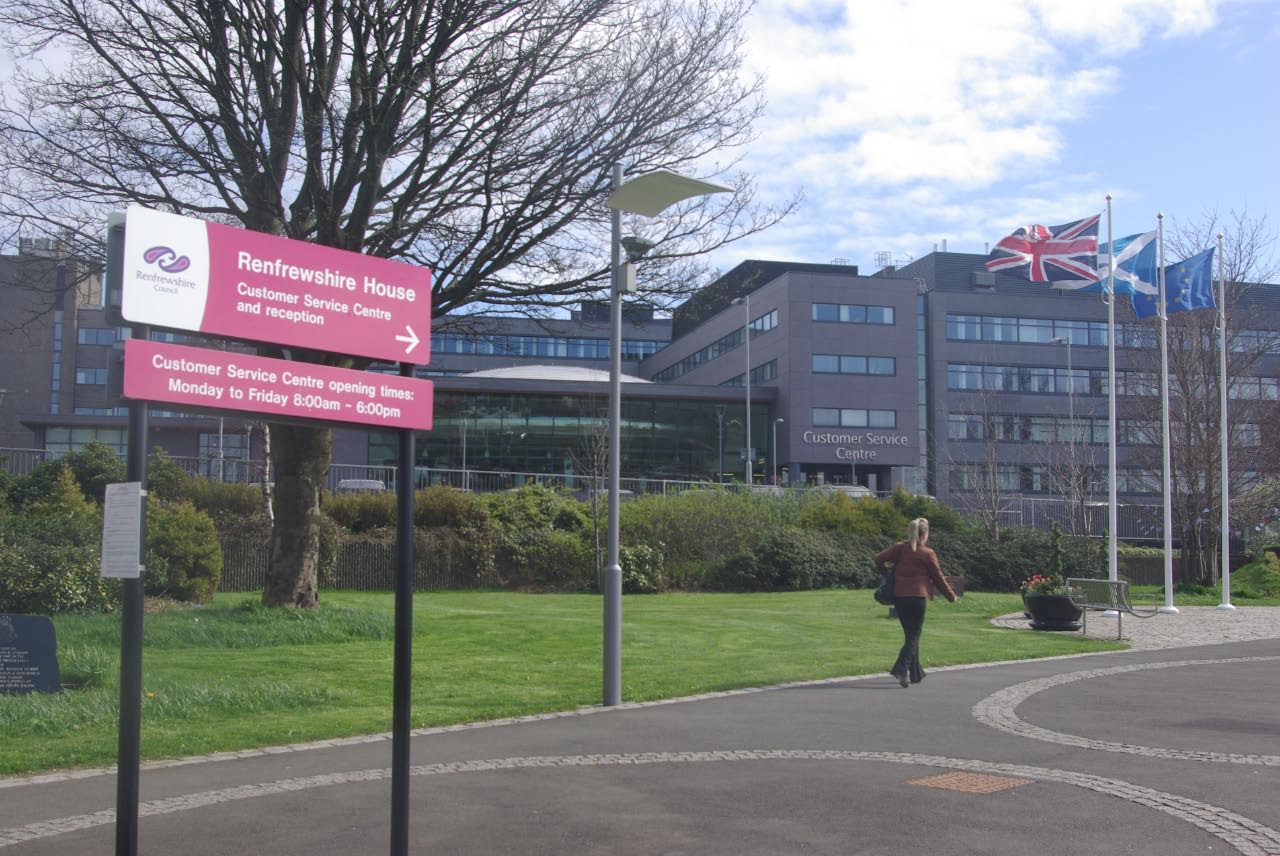
- Renfrewshire House, Cotton Street, Paisley, PA1 1AN

Website
- www.renfrewshire.gov.uk

Renfrewshire Council (Scottish Gaelic: Comhairle Siorrachd Rinn Friù) is the local authority for Renfrewshire, one of the 32 council areas of Scotland. It consists of 43 councillors who elect from among their number a provost to serve as the council's convener and ceremonial head and a leader of the council who is typically the head of the largest political group. The council is based at Renfrewshire House in Paisley.

The council meets collectively as a full council and carries out a number of functions. Its scheme of delegated functions sets out where the council has agreed to allow powers to be exercised by a committee (referred to as a "board" in Renfrewshire Council), a sub-committee, an officer of the council or a joint committee with one or more other councils. The council continues to reserve a number of functions that can only be carried out by the council acting as a whole. The council's staff is headed by a chief executive who is responsible to the elected council.

Renfrewshire Council acts as the lead authority for Scotland Excel, a collaborative procurement vehicle established in 2008 to support the local authorities of Scotland.

== Political control ==
The council has been under no overall control since 2017. Following the 2022 election an SNP minority administration took control of the council with support from independent councillor Andy Doig on a confidence and supply basis.

The first election to Renfrewshire Council was held in 1995, initially operating as a shadow authority alongside the outgoing authorities until the new system came into force on 1 April 1996. Political control of the council since 1996 has been as follows:

Party in control	Years
Labour	1996–2007
No overall control	2007–2012
Labour	2012–2017
No overall control	2017–present

=== Leadership ===
The role of provost is largely ceremonial in Renfrewshire. They chair full council meetings and act as the council's civic figurehead. Political leadership is provided by the leader of the council. The leaders since 1996 have been:

Councillor	Party	From	To
Hugh Henry	Labour	1 Apr 1996	May 1999
Jim Harkins	Labour	May 1999	May 2007
Derek Mackay	SNP	May 2007	May 2011
Brian Lawson	SNP	26 May 2011	May 2012
Mark MacMillan	Labour	May 2012	May 2017
Iain Nicolson	SNP	18 May 2017	

=== Council composition ===
Following the 2022 election and subsequent changes of allegiance up to June 2025, the composition of the council was:

Party	Seats
SNP	20
Labour	12
Conservative	5
Reform	3
Liberal Democrats	1
Independent	4
Total	45

The next election is due in 2027.

== Premises ==
The council is based at Renfrewshire House on Cotton Street in Paisley, which was built between 1969 and 1973 as the "County and Municipal Buildings", being a joint facility for the old Renfrewshire County Council and Paisley Town Council. After the reforms of 1975 the building was shared between Renfrew District Council and Strathclyde Regional Council. Following the creation of Renfrewshire Council in 1996 the building was renamed Renfrewshire House.

== Elections ==
Since 2007 elections have been held every five years under the single transferable vote system, introduced by the Local Governance (Scotland) Act 2004. Election results since 1995 have been as follows:

Year	Seats	SNP	Labour	Conservative	Liberal Democrats	Independent / Other	Notes
1995	40	13	22	2	3	0	
1999	40	15	21	1	3	0	New ward boundaries.
2003	40	15	21	1	3	0	
2007	40	17	17	2	4	0	New ward boundaries.
2012	40	15	22	1	1	1	
2017	43	19	13	8	1	2	New ward boundaries.
2022	43	21	15	5	1	1	

=== Electoral wards ===
Map of Renfrewshire's 12 wards, using 2017 boundaries

For the purposes of elections to Renfrewshire Council, the Renfrewshire area is divided geographically into a number of wards which then elect either three or four councillors each by the single transferable vote system. The electoral system of local councils in Scotland is governed by the Local Governance (Scotland) Act 2004, which first introduced proportional representation to councils in Scotland.

These electoral wards, following a 2017 review and first used in the 2017 Renfrewshire Council election are as follows:

Ward number	Ward Name	Location	Seats	Population (2020)
1	Renfrew North and Braehead		4	17,827
2	Renfrew South and Gallowhill		3	12,232
3	Paisley Northeast and Ralston		3	12,810
4	Paisley Northwest		4	17,018
5	Paisley East and Central		3	12,218
6	Paisley Southeast		3	12,925
7	Paisley Southwest		4	16,505
8	Johnstone South and Elderslie		4	15,860
9	Johnstone North, Kilbarchan, Howwood and Lochwinnoch		4	14,740
10	Houston, Crosslee and Linwood		4	19,152
11	Bishopton, Bridge of Weir and Langbank		3	10,040
12	Erskine and Inchinnan		4	18,063
