= 1995 Renfrewshire Council election =

1995 Scottish local government election

The 1995 Renfrewshire Council election was held on 6 April 1995, the same day as the other Scottish local government elections.

== Results ==
1995 Renfrewshire Council election result
| Party | Seats | Gains | Losses | Net gain/loss | Seats % | Votes % | Votes | +/− |
|---|---|---|---|---|---|---|---|---|
| Labour | 22 | - | - | ▼1 | 55.0 | 46.3 | 29,596 | ▲7.0 |
| SNP | 13 | - | - | ▲1 | 32.5 | 38.6 | 24,673 | ▲4.8 |
| Liberal Democrats | 3 | - | - | ▲1 | 7.5 | 5.9 | 3,788 | ▲1.6 |
| Conservative | 2 | - | - | ▼6 | 5.0 | 7.8 | 4,990 | ▼14.2 |
| Independent Labour | 0 | - | - | Steady | 0.0 | 1.2 | 759 | New |
| Monster Raving Loony | 0 | - | - | Steady | 0.0 | 0.2 | 121 | New |
| Scottish Green | 0 | - | - | Steady | 0.0 | 0.1 | 46 | ▼0.1 |

Note: Net changes relate to the results of the 1992 Renfrew District Council election.
