= West Scotland (Scottish Parliament electoral region) =

Scottish Parliament electoral region

- electoral region for the Scottish Parliament
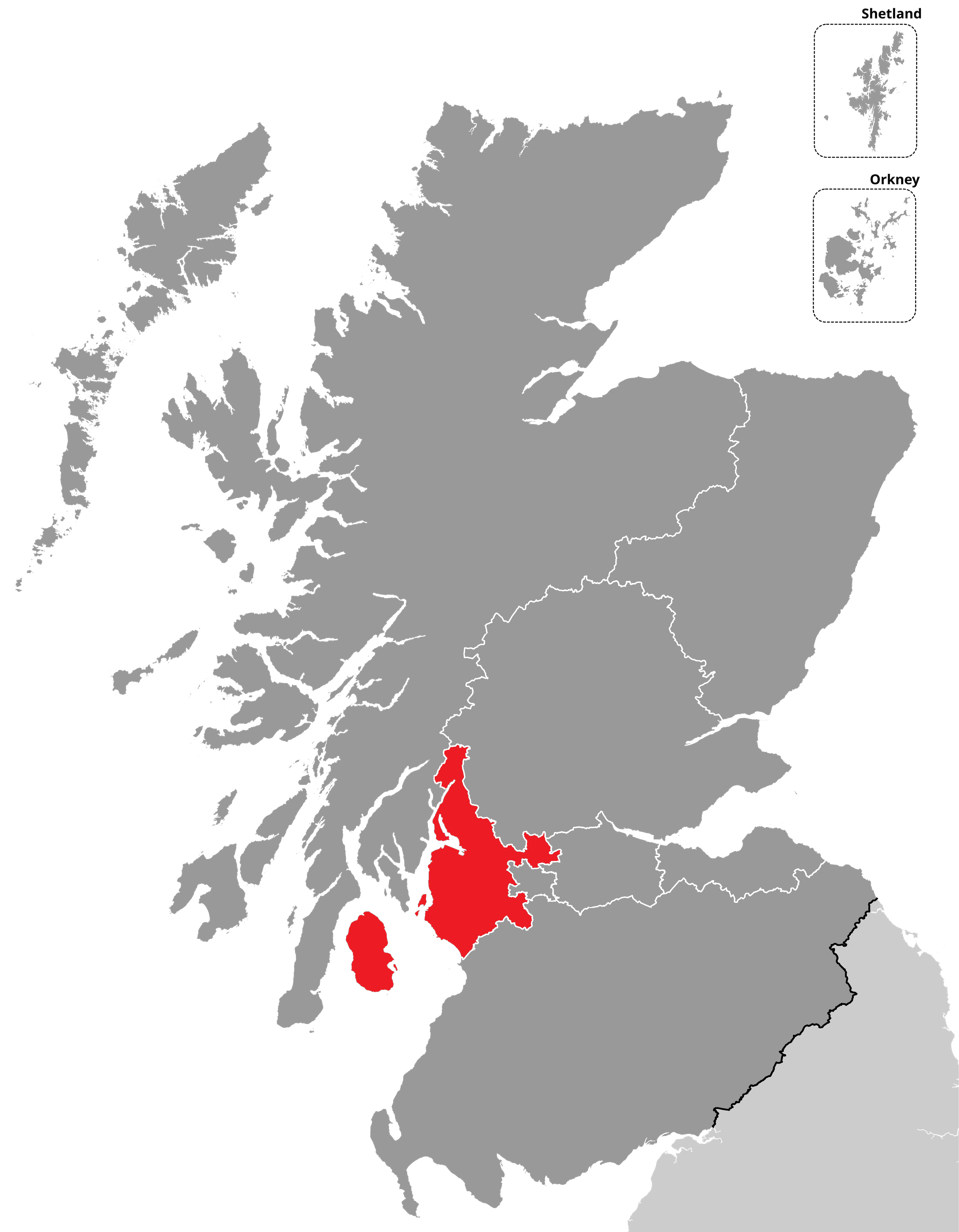
- West Scotland shown within Scotland
- Electorate: 591,614 (2022)

Current electoral region
- Created: 2011
- MSPs: Scottish National Party 8 Labour 4 Conservative 3 Scottish Green 1 Liberal Democrat 1
- Council areas: Argyll and Bute (part); Glasgow (part); East Ayrshire (part); East Dunbartonshire; East Renfrewshire; Inverclyde; North Ayrshire; Renfrewshire; West Dunbartonshire
- Constituencies: Clydebank and Milngavie; Cunninghame North; Cunninghame South; Dumbarton; Eastwood; Inverclyde; Paisley; Renfrewshire North and Cardonald; Renfrewshire West and Levern Valley; Strathkelvin and Bearsden

West Scotland is one of the eight electoral regions of the Scottish Parliament. Ten of the parliament's 73 first past the post constituencies are sub-divisions of the region. Under the additional-member electoral system used for elections to the Scottish Parliament, the region elects seven regional Members of the Scottish Parliament (MSPs), in addition to the ten constituency MSPs, to produce a form of proportional representation for the region as a whole, which thus elects a total of 17 MSPs.

The West Scotland electoral region was created as a result of the First Periodic Review of Scottish Parliament Boundaries and largely replaced the West of Scotland region.

The region covers the whole of the council areas of East Dunbartonshire, East Renfrewshire, Inverclyde, North Ayrshire, Renfrewshire, and West Dunbartonshire; and parts of the council areas of Argyll and Bute, East Ayrshire, and Glasgow.

== Constituencies and local government areas ==
=== Constituencies and council areas 2026–present ===
As a result of the Second Periodic Review in 2025, the boundaries for the region and constituencies were redrawn for the 2026 Scottish Parliament election. The West Scotland gained a small portion of the East Ayrshire council area from the South Scotland region due to boundary changes of the Cunninghame South constituency, and an area from the Glasgow region due to the new constituency of Renfrewshire North and Cardonald, which covers part of the city of Glasgow and Renfrewshire, being included within the region.

Region	Constituencies from 2026
	1. Clydebank and Milngavie; 2. Cunninghame North; 3. Cunninghame South; 4. Dumbarton; 5. Eastwood; 6. Inverclyde; 7. Paisley; 8. Renfrewshire North and Cardonald; 9. Renfrewshire West and Levern Valley; 10. Strathkelvin and Bearsden

=== Constituencies and council areas 2011–2026 ===
As a result of the First Periodic Review of Scottish Parliament Boundaries the boundaries for the region and constituencies were redrawn for the 2011 Scottish Parliament election.

Map of boundaries 2011-2026

In terms of first past the post constituencies the region covered:

Region	Constituencies (2011-2026)
	1. Clydebank and Milngavie; 2. Cunninghame North; 3. Cunninghame South; 4. Dumbarton; 5. Eastwood; 6. Greenock and Inverclyde; 7. Paisley; 8. Renfrewshire South; 9. Renfrewshire North and West; 10. Strathkelvin and Bearsden

== Members of the Scottish Parliament ==
=== Constituency MSPs ===
as West of Scotland
Term	Election	Strathkelvin and Bearsden	Clydebank and Milngavie	Dumbarton	Eastwood	Paisley South	Paisley North	West Renfrewshire	Greenock and Inverclyde	Cunninghame North	area formerly within the South of Scotland region prior to 2011
1st	1999	Sam Galbraith (Labour)	Des McNulty (Labour)	Jackie Baillie (Labour)	Ken Macintosh (Labour)	Hugh Henry (Labour)	Wendy Alexander (Labour)	Trish Godman (Labour)	Duncan McNeil (Labour)	Allan Wilson (Labour)	area formerly within the South of Scotland region prior to 2011
1st	1999	Brian Fitzpatrick (Labour)	Des McNulty (Labour)	Jackie Baillie (Labour)	Ken Macintosh (Labour)	Hugh Henry (Labour)	Wendy Alexander (Labour)	Trish Godman (Labour)	Duncan McNeil (Labour)	Allan Wilson (Labour)	area formerly within the South of Scotland region prior to 2011
2nd	2003	Jean Turner; Independent	Des McNulty (Labour)	Jackie Baillie (Labour)	Ken Macintosh (Labour)	Hugh Henry (Labour)	Wendy Alexander (Labour)	Trish Godman (Labour)	Duncan McNeil (Labour)	Allan Wilson (Labour)	area formerly within the South of Scotland region prior to 2011
3rd	2007	David Whitton (Labour)	Des McNulty (Labour)	Jackie Baillie (Labour)	Ken Macintosh (Labour)	Hugh Henry (Labour)	Wendy Alexander (Labour)	Trish Godman (Labour)	Duncan McNeil (Labour)	Kenneth Gibson (SNP)	area formerly within the South of Scotland region prior to 2011
as West Scotland
Term	Election	Strathkelvin and Bearsden	Clydebank and Milngavie	Dumbarton	Eastwood	Renfrewshire South	Paisley	Renfrewshire North and West	Greenock and Inverclyde	Cunninghame North	Cunninghame South
4th	2011	Fiona McLeod (SNP)	Gil Paterson (SNP)	Jackie Baillie (Labour)	Ken Macintosh (Labour)	Hugh Henry (Labour)	George Adam (SNP)	Derek Mackay (SNP)	Duncan McNeil (Labour)	Kenneth Gibson (SNP)	Margaret Burgess (SNP)
5th	2016	Rona Mackay (SNP)	Gil Paterson (SNP)	Jackie Baillie (Labour)	Jackson Carlaw (Conservative)	Tom Arthur (SNP)	George Adam (SNP)	Derek Mackay (SNP)	Stuart McMillan (SNP)	Kenneth Gibson (SNP)	Ruth Maguire (SNP)
6th	2021	Rona Mackay (SNP)	Marie McNair (SNP)	Jackie Baillie (Labour)	Jackson Carlaw (Conservative)	Tom Arthur (SNP)	George Adam (SNP)	Natalie Don (SNP)	Stuart McMillan (SNP)	Kenneth Gibson (SNP)	Ruth Maguire (SNP)
Term	Election	Strathkelvin and Bearsden	Clydebank and Milngavie	Dumbarton	Eastwood	Renfrewshire West and Levern Valley	Paisley	Renfrewshire North and Cardonald	Inverclyde	Cunninghame North	Cunninghame South
7th	2026	Adam Harley (Lib Dem)	Marie McNair (SNP)	Jackie Baillie (Labour)	Kirsten Oswald (SNP)	Tom Arthur (SNP)	George Adam (SNP)	Michelle Campbell (SNP)	Stuart McMillan (SNP)	Kenneth Gibson (SNP)	Patricia Gibson (SNP)

=== Regional list MSPs ===
N.B. This table is for presentation purposes only

as West of Scotland
Parliament	MSP	MSP	MSP	MSP	MSP	MSP	MSP
1st (1999–2003)	Colin Campbell (SNP)	Kay Ullrich (SNP)	Lloyd Quinan (SNP)	Fiona McLeod (SNP)	Ross Finnie (Lib Dem)	Annabel Goldie (Conservative)	John Young (Conservative)
2nd (2003–07)	Stewart Maxwell (SNP)	Campbell Martin (SNP)	Bruce McFee (SNP)	Frances Curran (Socialist)	Ross Finnie (Lib Dem)	Annabel Goldie (Conservative)	Murray Tosh (Conservative)
3rd (2007–11)	Stewart Maxwell (SNP)	Stuart McMillan (SNP)	Bill Wilson (SNP)	Gil Paterson (SNP)	Ross Finnie (Lib Dem)	Annabel Goldie (Conservative)	Jackson Carlaw (Conservative)
as West Scotland
4th (2011–16)	Stewart Maxwell (SNP)	Stuart McMillan (SNP)	Mary Fee (Labour)	Neil Bibby (Labour)	Margaret McDougall (Labour)	Annabel Goldie (Conservative)	Jackson Carlaw (Conservative)
5th (2016–21)	Ross Greer (Green)	Ken Macintosh (Labour)	Mary Fee (Labour)	Neil Bibby (Labour)	Jamie Greene (Conservative) (later Lib Dem)	Maurice Golden (Conservative)	Maurice Corry (Conservative)
6th (2021–26)	Ross Greer (Green)	Paul O'Kane (Labour)	Katy Clark (Labour)	Neil Bibby (Labour)	Jamie Greene (Conservative) (later Lib Dem)	Pam Gosal (Conservative)	Russell Findlay (Conservative)
2025	Ross Greer (Green)	Paul O'Kane (Labour)	Katy Clark (Labour)	Neil Bibby (Labour)	Jamie Greene (Conservative) (later Lib Dem)	Pam Gosal (Conservative)	Russell Findlay (Conservative)
7th (2026–)	Ross Greer (Green)	Cara McKee (Green)	Katy Clark (Labour)	Neil Bibby (Labour)	David Smith (Reform)	Malcolm Offord (Reform)	Russell Findlay (Conservative)

== Election results ==
=== 2026 Scottish Parliament election ===
==== Constituency results ====
2026 Scottish Parliament election: West Scotland
Constituency	Elected member	Result
Clydebank and Milngavie	Marie McNair	SNP **hold**
Cunninghame North	Kenneth Gibson	SNP **hold**
Cunninghame South	Patricia Gibson	SNP **hold**
Dumbarton	Jackie Baillie	Labour **hold**
Eastwood	Kirsten Oswald	SNP **gain** from Conservative
Inverclyde	Stuart McMillan	SNP **hold**
Paisley	George Adam	SNP **hold**
Renfrewshire North and Cardonald	Michelle Campbell	SNP **hold**
Renfrewshire West and Levern Valley	Tom Arthur	SNP **hold**
Strathkelvin and Bearsden	Adam Harley	Liberal Democrats **gain** from SNP

==== Additional Member results ====
2026 Scottish Parliament election: West Scotland
List	Candidates	Votes	Of total (%)	± from prev.
SNP	Stuart McMillan, Kirsten Oswald, Michelle Campbell, Patricia Gibson, Kenneth Gibson, Tom Arthur, Sophie Traynor, Denis Johnston, Michael Gibbons, Andrew Steel	91,257	27.3	▼13.4
Labour	Jackie Baillie, **Neil Bibby**, **Katy Clark**, Paul O'Kane, Francesca Brennan, Kayleigh Quinn, Mike McKirdy, Colette McDiarmid, Matthew McGowan	68,045	20.4	▼1.9
Reform	**Malcolm Offord**, **David Smith**, Moira Ramage, Mike Mann, Matt McLean, Andy White	58,332	17.5	▲17.3
Green	**Ross John Greer**, **Cara McKee**, Karen Frances Sharkey, Paula Baker, Ross Collins	41,372	12.4	▲5.4
Conservative	**Russell Findlay**, Jackson Carlaw, Pam Gosal, Alix Mathieson, Gary Mulvaney, Maurice Corry, Jack Hall, Ronnie Stalker, Farooq Choudhry, Ted Runciman	31,867	9.5	▼12.1
Liberal Democrats	Adam Alexander Harley, Jamie Gillan Greene, Christine Margaret Murdoch, Grant Robert Toghill, Emma Florence Farthing, Ross Stalker, Elaine Ruth Ford	24,852	7.4	▲3.9
Independent Green Voice	Ian Inkster	2,721	0.8	▲0.3
Scottish Family	Liam McKechnie, Luke Reid, Matt Lynch, Paul Gallacher	2,668	0.8	▲0.2
AtLS	Gordon James Ross, Simon McLean, Kenneth Steven McNeil, Ian Vallance, Eamonn John Gallagher	2,490	0.7	N/A
Socialist Labour	James McDaid, Louise Anne Margaret McDaid, Bobby Cochrane, Bryan McLardy, David Don Jacobsen	2,260	0.7	N/A
Liberal	Allan Richard Morison Steele, Andrew Keir MacGregor	1,748	0.5	N/A
ISP	Colette Walker	1,634	0.5	N/A
Scottish Socialist	Veronica Edgely, Jonathan Judge, Colin Edgely	1,444	0.4	N/A
Independent	William Wallace	890	0.3	N/A
Alliance for Democracy and Freedom	Ken Thomson, Ian Gibson	804	0.2	N/A
Scottish Common Party	Claire Gallagher	542	0.2	N/A
UKIP	Ben Walker, Mike Pursglove, Gillian Ammoun	356	0.1	0
Independent	Paul Mack	308	0.1	N/A
Independent	Paddy McCarthy	290	0.1	N/A
Scottish Libertarian	Alex William Findlay, Cameron Alexander Milne	263	0.1	0

=== 2021 Scottish Parliament election ===
In the 2021 Scottish Parliament election the region elected MSPs as follows:

==== Constituency results ====
2021 Scottish Parliament election: West Scotland
Constituency	Elected member	Result
Clydebank and Milngavie	Marie McNair	SNP **hold**
Cunninghame North	Kenneth Gibson	SNP **hold**
Cunninghame South	Ruth Maguire	SNP **hold**
Dumbarton	Jackie Baillie	Labour **hold**
Eastwood	Jackson Carlaw	Conservative **hold**
Greenock and Inverclyde	Stuart McMillan	SNP **hold**
Paisley	George Adam	SNP **hold**
Renfrewshire North and West	Natalie Don	SNP **hold**
Renfrewshire South	Tom Arthur	SNP **hold**
Strathkelvin and Bearsden	Rona Mackay	SNP **hold**

==== Additional member results ====
2021 Scottish Parliament election: West Scotland
List	Candidates	Votes	Of total (%)	± from prev.
SNP	Michelle Campbell, Stuart McMillan, Kenneth Gibson, Rona Mackay, Colm Merrick, Lorna Douglas, Annette Ireland, Debra Torrance, Gavin Lundy, Jonathan McColl, Daniel Kennedy	152,671	40.4	▼1.8
Labour	Jackie Baillie, **Neil Bibby**, **Katy Clark**, **Paul O'Kane**, Johanna Baxter, Matt Kerr, Francesca Brennan, Douglas McAllister, Katie Pragnell, Gurpreet Singh Johal, Ed Grady, Nairn McDonald	83,782	22.2	▼0.3
Conservative	Jackson Carlaw, **Russell Findlay**, **Jamie Greene**, **Pam Gosal**, Julie Pirone, Andrew Polson, Derek Stillie, Maurice Corry, Caroline Hollins-Martin, David Rocks	82,640	21.9	▼0.3
Green	**Ross Greer**, Carolynn Scrimgeour, Scott Bevan, Erin Crawley, Ross Collins, Emma Sheppard, Charley O'Hear	26,632	7.1	▲1.8
Liberal Democrats	Katy Gordon, Jacci Stoyle, Susan Murray, Ross Stalker, Rod Ackland, Eileen McCartin, Ruby Kirkwood	13,570	3.6	▼0.2
Alba	Christopher McEleny, Caroline McAllister, Ellen McMaster, Delia Henry	6,133	1.6	▲1.6
All for Unity	David Griffiths, Catherine McCall, Paul McLafferty, Senol Jason Ali, Calum Robertson, Rhona Cameron, Robert Aikman	3,372	0.9	▲0.9
Scottish Family	Liam McKechnie, Martin Bell, Matthew Lynch, Mary Toal, Cecilia Tortolano	2,345	0.6	▲0.6
Independent Green Voice	Iain Inkster	1,983	0.5	▲0.5
Abolish the Scottish Parliament	Robert Watson	916	0.2	▲0.2
Freedom Alliance	Jill McGowan, Maria Smith, Grant Stirling, Mark Turnbull	766	0.2	▲0.2
Reform	John McCallum, Wayne Darnell, Peter Sievwright, Martyn Greene	600	0.2	▲0.2
Scottish Libertarian	Jonathan Rainey	499	0.1	▼0.1
TUSC	Jim Halfpenny, Lynda McEwan, Ian Kerr	479	0.1	▲0.1
UKIP	Janice Mackay, Eunice Normansell, Robert Hill, Sharon Boyle, Ian Emery	463	0.1	▼1.7
Scotia Future	Andy Doig	257	0.1	▲0.1
Independent	James Morrison	248	0.1	▲0.1
Independent	Maurice Campbell	234	0.1	▲0.1
Renew	Peter Morton	97	0.0	▲0.0

=== 2016 Scottish Parliament election ===
In the 2016 Scottish Parliament election the region elected MSPs as follows:

- 8 Scottish National Party MSPs (all constituency members)
- 4 Labour MSPs (one constituency member and three additional members)
- 4 Conservative MSPs (one constituency member and three additional members)
- 1 Scottish Greens MSP (a regional member)

==== Constituency results ====
2016 Scottish Parliament election: West Scotland
Constituency	Elected member	Result
Clydebank and Milngavie	Gil Paterson	SNP **hold**
Cunninghame North	Kenneth Gibson	SNP **hold**
Cunninghame South	Ruth Maguire	SNP **hold**
Dumbarton	Jackie Baillie	Labour **hold**
Eastwood	Jackson Carlaw	Conservative **gain** from Labour
Greenock and Inverclyde	Stuart McMillan	SNP **gain** from Labour
Paisley	George Adam	SNP **hold**
Renfrewshire North and West	Derek Mackay	SNP **hold**
Renfrewshire South	Tom Arthur	SNP **gain** from Labour
Strathkelvin and Bearsden	Rona Mackay	SNP **hold**

==== Additional member results ====
Elected regional list MSPs are shown in bold; elected constituency MSPs, who stood on a party list, are shown in italics.

2016 Scottish Parliament election: West Scotland
List	Candidates	Votes	Of total (%)	± from prev.
SNP	Derek Mackay, Stewart Maxwell, Kenneth Gibson, Stuart McMillan, Rona Mackay, Ian McDougall, Gil Paterson, Gail Robertson, Ruth Maguire, Qasim Hanif, Nighet Riaz	135,827	42.2	+0.6
Labour	Jackie Baillie, **Neil Bibby**, **Mary Fee**, **Ken Macintosh**, Johanna Baxter, Joe Cullinane, Siobhan McCready, Martin McCluskey, Moira Ramage, Paul Sweeney, Gail Casey, Ben Procter	72,544	22.5	−10.2
Conservative	Jackson Carlaw, **Jamie Greene**, **Maurice Golden**, **Maurice Corry**, Andrew Polson, David Wilson, Paul Masterton, Graeme Brooks, Billy McClure, Ann Le Blond	71,528	22.2	+9.5
Green	**Ross Greer**, Veronika Tudhope, Ciaran Roarty, Yvonne McLellan, Joshua McCormick, Fiona Clark, Ryan Paul Morrison, Sarah Anderson	17,218	5.3	+2.4
Liberal Democrats	Katy Gordon, Ashay Ghai, Aileen Morton, Ruby Kirkwood, John Mandby Watson, John William Duncan, Charity Elizabeth Pierce, Tristan Philip Pierre Gray	12,097	3.8	+0.5
UKIP	Sharon Marie McGonigal, Michael Burrows, Robert Malyn	5,856	1.8	+1.1
Solidarity	Gail Sheridan, Garry MacLachlan, Patricia Donald, Archibald Muir Thomson, Susan Thomson	2,609	0.8	+0.7
Scottish Christian	Brian Lally	2,391	0.7	−0.1
RISE	Colin Turbett, Sandra Webster, Kieran McCallum, Lindsay Brown	1,522	0.5	N/A
Scottish Libertarian	Alan Findlay	484	0.2	N/A

=== 2011 Scottish Parliament election ===
In the 2011 Scottish Parliament election the region elected MSPs as follows:

- 8 Scottish National Party MSPs (six constituency members and two additional members)
- 7 Labour MSPs (four constituency members and three additional members)
- 2 Conservative MSPs (both additional members)

==== Constituency results ====
2011 Scottish Parliament election: West Scotland
Constituency	Elected member	Result
Clydebank and Milngavie	Gil Paterson	SNP **gain** from Labour
Cunninghame North	Kenneth Gibson	SNP **hold**
Cunninghame South	Margaret Burgess	SNP **gain** from Labour
Dumbarton	Jackie Baillie	Labour **hold**
Eastwood	Ken Macintosh	Labour **hold**
Greenock and Inverclyde	Duncan McNeil	Labour **hold**
Paisley	George Adam	SNP **gain** from Labour
Renfrewshire North and West	Derek Mackay	SNP **gain** from Labour
Renfrewshire South	Hugh Henry	Labour **hold**
Strathkelvin and Bearsden	Fiona McLeod	SNP **gain** from Labour

==== Additional member results ====
2011 Scottish Parliament election: West Scotland
Party	Elected candidates	Seats	+/−	Votes	%	+/−%
SNP	Stewart Maxwell; Stuart McMillan	2	-2	117,306	41.5	+13
Labour	Mary Fee; Neil Bibby; Margaret McDougall	3	+3	92,530	32.8	-1.8
Conservative	Annabel Goldie; Jackson Carlaw	2	±0	35,995	12.7	-2
Liberal Democrats		0	-1	9,148	3.2	-4.9
Green		0	0	8,414	3.0	±0
Scottish Senior Citizens		0	0	4,771	1.7	-0.3
Socialist Labour		0	0	2,865	1.0	+0.4
Scottish Christian		0	0	2,468	0.9	-0.5
BNP		0	0	2,162	0.8	-0.5
UKIP		0	0	2,000	0.7	+0.4
Scottish Socialist		0	0	1,752	0.6	±0
Ban Bankers Bonuses		0	0	1,204	0.4	±0
Pirate		0	0	850	0.3	±0
Independent		0	0	460	0.2	±0
Solidarity		0	0	446	0.2	-1.8

== Footnotes ==
Preceded by Mid Fife and Glenrothes	Constituency or Region represented by the Presiding Officer; 2016–2021	Succeeded by Lothian
