= 6th Scottish Parliament =

Legislature elected in 2021

←	5th Scottish Parliament	7th Scottish Parliament	→
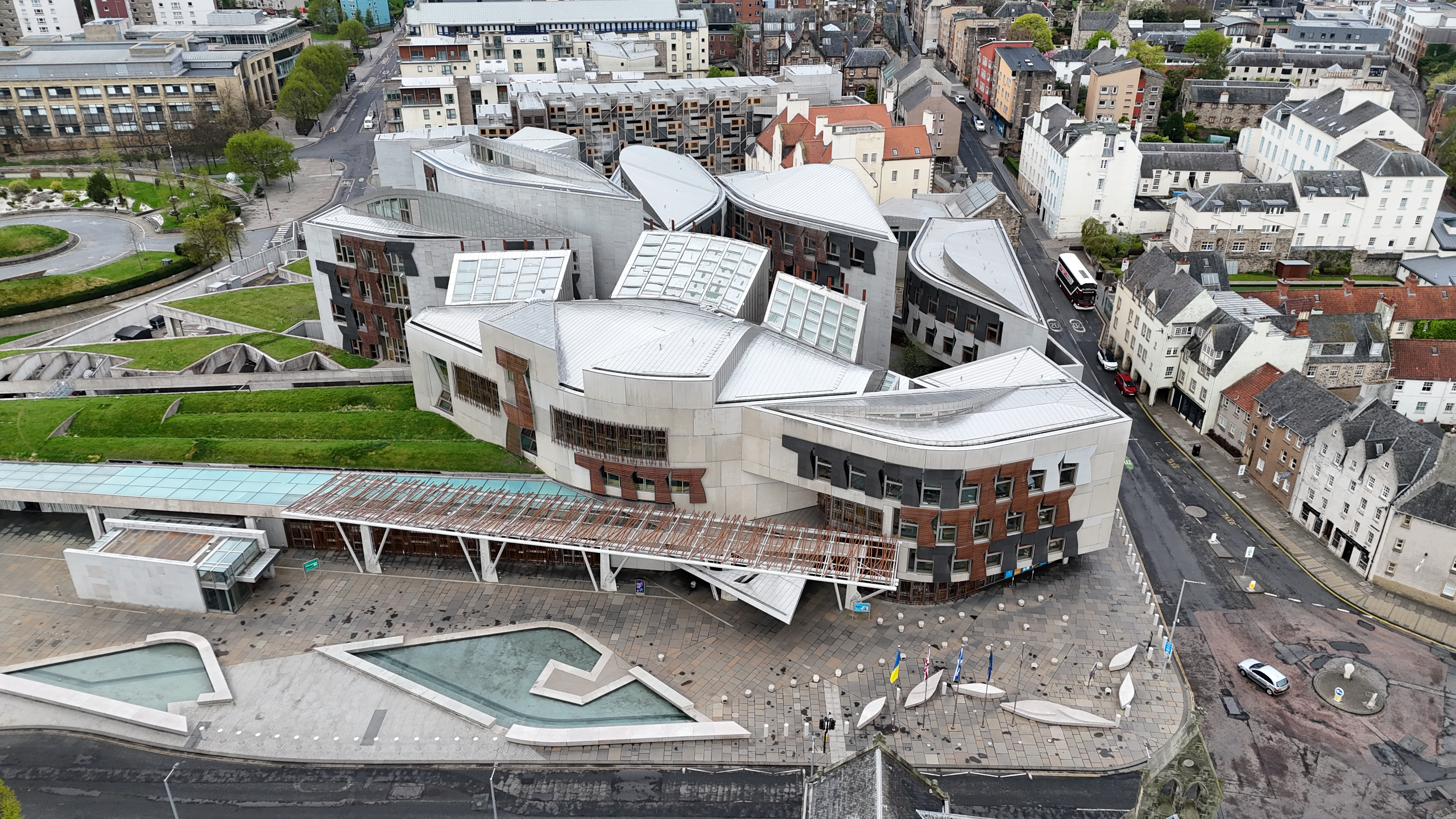
- Scottish Parliament Building, 2025

Overview
- Legislative body: Scottish Parliament
- Jurisdiction: Scotland
- Meeting place: Scottish Parliament Building
- Term: 13 May 2021 – 8 April 2026
- Election: 2021
- Government: Sturgeon III; Yousaf I; Yousaf II; Swinney
- Members: 129
- Presiding Officer: Alison Johnstone
- First Minister: Nicola Sturgeon (2021–2023); Humza Yousaf (2023–2024); John Swinney (2024–2026)
- Deputy First Minister: John Swinney (2021–2023); Shona Robison (2023–2024); Kate Forbes (2024–2026)
- Leader of the largest opposition party: Douglas Ross (2021–2024); Russell Findlay (2024–2026)

The 6th Scottish Parliament was elected at the 2021 Scottish Parliament election. It was opened with the Escort to the Crown of Scotland Parade and Speech from the Throne on 2 October 2021.

== Composition ==
Party		May 2021 election	At dissolution
•	Scottish National Party	64	60
	Scottish Conservatives	31	28
	Scottish Labour	22 (Note: Includes 11 MSPs sponsored by the Co-operative Party, who are designated Labour and Co-operative.)	20 (Note: Includes 10 MSPs sponsored by the Co-operative Party, who are designated Labour and Co-operative.)
	Scottish Greens	8	7
	Scottish Liberal Democrats	4	5
	Reform UK Scotland	0	1
	Independent	0	7
	Presiding Officer	0	1
Total		129	
Government majority		0	– 8

Government parties denoted with bullets (•)

== Leadership ==
- Presiding Officer: Alison Johnstone (Independent) (Note: Johnstone was elected as Green MSP but relinquished her membership in order to take the office of Presiding Officer.)
- Deputy Presiding Officers: Annabelle Ewing (SNP), Liam McArthur (Lib Dems)

=== Government ===
- First Minister: Nicola Sturgeon (SNP) (until 28 March 2023) Humza Yousaf (SNP) (29 March 2023 – 7 May 2024) John Swinney (SNP) (8 May 2024 – 8 April 2026)
- Deputy First Minister: John Swinney (SNP) (until 28 March 2023) Shona Robison (SNP) (29 March 2023 – 8 May 2024) Kate Forbes (SNP) (8 May 2024 – 8 April 2026)
- Minister for Parliamentary Business: George Adam (SNP) (May 2021 – May 2024) Jamie Hepburn (SNP) (May 2024 – September 2025) Graeme Dey (SNP) (September 2025 – April 2026)

=== Opposition parties ===
- Conservative leader: Russell Findlay
- Labour leader: Michael Marra
- Greens leaders: Ross Greer & Gillian Mackay
- Liberal Democrats leader: Alex Cole-Hamilton

== List of MSPs ==
This is a list of MSPs so far elected. The changes table below records all changes in party affiliation during the session, since the May 2021 election.

There are eight MSPs who have been constant members since the inauguration of the Parliament in 1999 (ten other founding members retired prior to the 2021 election): Jackie Baillie, Fergus Ewing and John Swinney have been elected six times under the same constituency (Swinney's was renamed with different boundaries in 2011); Christine Grahame, Fiona Hyslop, Michael Matheson, Shona Robison and Nicola Sturgeon were returned as a list member then a constituency member. A ninth MSP Richard Lochhead has served almost the same term, resigning his list seat in 2006 to successfully contest a by-election a few weeks later for a constituency seat, which he has defended since then.

Name	Image	Member for	Type	Party
George Adam		Paisley	Constituency	Scottish National Party
Karen Adam		Banffshire and Buchan Coast	Constituency	Scottish National Party
Clare Adamson		Motherwell and Wishaw	Constituency	Scottish National Party
Alasdair Allan		Na h-Eileanan an Iar	Constituency	Scottish National Party
Tom Arthur		Renfrewshire South	Constituency	Scottish National Party
Jackie Baillie		Dumbarton	Constituency	Labour
Claire Baker		Mid Scotland and Fife	Regional	Labour Co-op
Jeremy Balfour		Lothian	Regional	Independent
Colin Beattie		Midlothian North and Musselburgh	Constituency	Scottish National Party
Neil Bibby		West Scotland	Regional	Labour Co-op
Sarah Boyack		Lothian	Regional	Labour Co-op
Miles Briggs		Lothian	Regional	Conservatives
Keith Brown		Clackmannanshire and Dunblane	Constituency	Scottish National Party
Siobhian Brown		Ayr	Constituency	Scottish National Party
Ariane Burgess		Highlands and Islands	Regional	Greens
Alexander Burnett		Aberdeenshire West	Constituency	Conservatives
Stephanie Callaghan		Uddingston and Bellshill	Constituency	Scottish National Party
Jackson Carlaw		Eastwood	Constituency	Conservatives
Finlay Carson		Galloway and West Dumfries	Constituency	Conservatives
Maggie Chapman		North East Scotland	Regional	Greens
Foysol Choudhury		Lothian	Regional	Independent
Katy Clark		West Scotland	Regional	Labour
Willie Coffey		Kilmarnock and Irvine Valley	Constituency	Scottish National Party
Alex Cole-Hamilton		Edinburgh Western	Constituency	Liberal Democrats
Angela Constance		Almond Valley	Constituency	Scottish National Party
Graeme Dey		Angus South	Constituency	Scottish National Party
Natalie Don		Renfrewshire North and West	Constituency	Scottish National Party
Bob Doris		Glasgow Maryhill and Springburn	Constituency	Scottish National Party
James Dornan		Glasgow Cathcart	Constituency	Scottish National Party
Sharon Dowey		South Scotland	Regional	Conservatives
Jackie Dunbar		Aberdeen Donside	Constituency	Scottish National Party
Pam Duncan-Glancy		Glasgow	Regional	Independent
Tim Eagle		Highlands and Islands (since 12/02/24)	Regional	Conservatives
Annabelle Ewing		Cowdenbeath	Constituency	Scottish National Party
Fergus Ewing		Inverness and Nairn	Constituency	Independent
Jim Fairlie		Perthshire South and Kinross-shire	Constituency	Scottish National Party
Russell Findlay		West Scotland	Regional	Conservatives
Joe FitzPatrick		Dundee City West	Constituency	Scottish National Party
Kate Forbes		Skye, Lochaber and Badenoch	Constituency	Scottish National Party
Murdo Fraser		Mid Scotland and Fife	Regional	Conservatives
Meghan Gallacher		Central Scotland	Regional	Conservatives
Kenneth Gibson		Cunninghame North	Constituency	Scottish National Party
Jenny Gilruth		Mid Fife and Glenrothes	Constituency	Scottish National Party
Maurice Golden		North East Scotland	Regional	Conservatives
Pam Gosal		West Scotland	Regional	Conservatives
Mairi Gougeon		Angus North and Mearns	Constituency	Scottish National Party
Christine Grahame		Midlothian South, Tweeddale and Lauderdale	Constituency	Scottish National Party
Rhoda Grant		Highlands and Islands	Regional	Labour Co-op
Neil Gray		Airdrie and Shotts	Constituency	Scottish National Party
Jamie Greene		West Scotland	Regional	Liberal Democrats
Ross Greer		West Scotland	Regional	Greens
Mark Griffin		Central Scotland	Regional	Labour
Sandesh Gulhane		Glasgow	Regional	Conservatives
Jamie Halcro Johnston		Highlands and Islands	Regional	Conservatives
Rachael Hamilton		Ettrick, Roxburgh and Berwickshire	Constituency	Conservatives
Emma Harper		South Scotland	Regional	Scottish National Party
Patrick Harvie		Glasgow	Regional	Greens
Clare Haughey		Rutherglen	Constituency	Scottish National Party
Jamie Hepburn		Cumbernauld and Kilsyth	Constituency	Scottish National Party
Craig Hoy		South Scotland	Regional	Conservatives
Fiona Hyslop		Linlithgow	Constituency	Scottish National Party
Daniel Johnson		Edinburgh Southern	Constituency	Labour Co-op
Alison Johnstone		Lothian	Regional	Presiding Officer
Liam Kerr		North East Scotland	Regional	Conservatives
Stephen Kerr		Central Scotland	Regional	Conservatives
Bill Kidd		Glasgow Anniesland	Constituency	Scottish National Party
Monica Lennon		Central Scotland	Regional	Labour Co-op
Richard Leonard		Central Scotland	Regional	Labour
Richard Lochhead		Moray	Constituency	Scottish National Party
Douglas Lumsden		North East Scotland	Regional	Conservatives
Gordon MacDonald		Edinburgh Pentlands	Constituency	Scottish National Party
Fulton MacGregor		Coatbridge and Chryston	Constituency	Scottish National Party
Gillian Mackay		Central Scotland	Regional	Greens
Rona Mackay		Strathkelvin and Bearsden	Constituency	Scottish National Party
Ben Macpherson		Edinburgh Northern and Leith	Constituency	Scottish National Party
Ruth Maguire		Cunninghame South	Constituency	Scottish National Party
Michael Marra		North East Scotland	Regional	Labour
Gillian Martin		Aberdeenshire East	Constituency	Scottish National Party
John Mason		Glasgow Shettleston	Constituency	Independent
Michael Matheson		Falkirk West	Constituency	Scottish National Party
Màiri McAllan		Clydesdale	Constituency	Scottish National Party
Liam McArthur		Orkney	Constituency	Liberal Democrats
Roz McCall		Mid Scotland and Fife (since 20/09/22)	Regional	Conservatives
Ivan McKee		Glasgow Provan	Constituency	Scottish National Party
Paul McLennan		East Lothian	Constituency	Scottish National Party
Stuart McMillan		Greenock and Inverclyde	Constituency	Scottish National Party
Marie McNair		Clydebank and Milngavie	Constituency	Scottish National Party
Pauline McNeill		Glasgow	Regional	Labour Co-op
Jenni Minto		Argyll and Bute	Constituency	Scottish National Party
Carol Mochan		South Scotland	Regional	Labour
Sir Edward Mountain		Highlands and Islands	Regional	Conservatives
Oliver Mundell		Dumfriesshire	Constituency	Conservatives
Audrey Nicoll		Aberdeen South and North Kincardine	Constituency	Scottish National Party
Paul O'Kane		West Scotland	Regional	Labour Co-op
Ash Regan		Edinburgh Eastern	Constituency	Independent
Willie Rennie		North East Fife	Constituency	Liberal Democrats
Angus Robertson		Edinburgh Central	Constituency	Scottish National Party
Shona Robison		Dundee City East	Constituency	Scottish National Party
Emma Roddick		Highlands and Islands	Regional	Scottish National Party
Douglas Ross		Highlands and Islands	Regional	Conservatives
Alex Rowley		Mid Scotland and Fife	Regional	Labour
Mark Ruskell		Mid Scotland and Fife	Regional	Greens
Davy Russell		Hamilton, Larkhall and Stonehouse (since 06/06/25)	Constituency	Labour
Anas Sarwar		Glasgow	Regional	Labour Co-op
Graham Simpson		Central Scotland	Regional	Reform UK
Lorna Slater		Lothian	Regional	Greens
Liz Smith		Mid Scotland and Fife	Regional	Conservatives
Colin Smyth		South Scotland	Regional	Independent
Shirley-Anne Somerville		Dunfermline	Constituency	Scottish National Party
Collette Stevenson		East Kilbride	Constituency	Scottish National Party
Alexander Stewart		Mid Scotland and Fife	Regional	Conservatives
Kaukab Stewart		Glasgow Kelvin	Constituency	Scottish National Party
Kevin Stewart		Aberdeen Central	Constituency	Scottish National Party
Nicola Sturgeon		Glasgow Southside	Constituency	Scottish National Party
Paul Sweeney		Glasgow	Regional	Labour Co-op
John Swinney		Perthshire North	Constituency	Scottish National Party
Michelle Thomson		Falkirk East	Constituency	Scottish National Party
Maree Todd		Caithness, Sutherland and Ross	Constituency	Scottish National Party
David Torrance		Kirkcaldy	Constituency	Scottish National Party
Evelyn Tweed		Stirling	Constituency	Scottish National Party
Mercedes Villalba		North East Scotland	Regional	Labour
Sue Webber		Lothian	Regional	Conservatives
Annie Wells		Glasgow	Regional	Conservatives
Tess White		North East Scotland	Regional	Conservatives
Martin Whitfield		South Scotland	Regional	Labour
Elena Whitham		Carrick, Cumnock and Doon Valley	Constituency	Scottish National Party
Brian Whittle		South Scotland	Regional	Conservatives
Beatrice Wishart		Shetland	Constituency	Liberal Democrats
Humza Yousaf		Glasgow Pollok	Constituency	Scottish National Party

=== Former MSPs ===
Name	Image	Member for	Type	Party	Notes
Dean Lockhart		Mid Scotland and Fife	Regional	Scottish Conservatives	Resigned 5 September 2022
Donald Cameron		Highlands and Islands	Regional	Scottish Conservatives	Resigned 9 February 2024
Christina McKelvie		Hamilton, Larkhall and Stonehouse	Constituency	Scottish National Party	Died 27 March 2025

== Changes ==
Date	Constituency/region	Gain	Loss	Note
13 May 2021	Lothian	Presiding Officer	Green	Alison Johnstone was elected Presiding Officer and consequently had to renounce her party affiliation.
5 September 2022	Mid Scotland and Fife	Conservative	Conservative	Dean Lockhart resigned his seat in the Scottish Parliament. He was succeeded by Roz McCall, who was sworn in on 20 September.
28 October 2023	Edinburgh Eastern	Alba	SNP	Ash Regan defected from the SNP to Alba, becoming the party's first MSP.
9 February 2024	Highlands and Islands	Conservative	Conservative	Donald Cameron was appointed to the House of Lords in the 2024 Special Honours and was replaced by Tim Eagle.
17 August 2024	Glasgow Shettleston	Independent	SNP	John Mason had whip suspended over Gaza comments.
4 April 2025	West Scotland	Liberal Democrats	Conservative	Jamie Greene left the Conservative Party due to his disagreement with it becoming "Trump-esque in both style and substance", and joined the Liberal Democrats the next day.
6 June 2025	Hamilton, Larkhall and Stonehouse	Labour	SNP	Davy Russell won the Hamilton, Larkhall and Stonehouse by-election following the death of SNP MSP Christina McKelvie.
20 June 2025	Inverness and Nairn	Independent	SNP	Fergus Ewing announced he would stand as an independent in the 2026 parliament election. Ewing said he had not quit the SNP, but a party source said his membership automatically ceased when he announced his independent run, a violation of the SNP's party constitution.
20 August 2025	South Scotland	Independent	Labour Co-op	Colin Smyth was suspended from the Labour and Co-operative Party after being charged with possession of indecent images.
22 August 2025	Lothian	Independent	Conservative	Jeremy Balfour resigned from the Scottish Conservatives due to disagreements over policy and direction
27 August 2025	Central Scotland	Reform	Conservative	Graham Simpson resigned from the Scottish Conservatives and joined Reform UK
27 September 2025	Lothian	Independent	Labour	Foysol Choudhury was suspended from the Labour Party over an allegation of inappropriate conduct pending an investigation.
10 October 2025	Edinburgh Eastern	Independent	Alba	Ash Regan resigned from the Alba Party to focus on the Prostitution (Offences and Support) (Scotland) Bill.
10 February 2026	Glasgow	Independent	Labour	Pam Duncan-Glancy was suspended from the Labour Party over her friendship with former Labour councillor and convicted sex offender Sean Morton.
