= Fiona McLeod =

Scottish National Party politician

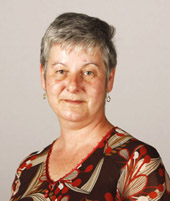
- McLeod in 2011

Minister for Children and Young People
- Acting
- In office 18 December 2014 – 31 August 2015
- First Minister: Nicola Sturgeon
- Preceded by: Aileen Campbell
- Succeeded by: Aileen Campbell

Member of the Scottish Parliament for Strathkelvin and Bearsden
- In office 5 May 2011 – 24 March 2016
- Preceded by: David Whitton
- Succeeded by: Rona Mackay

Member of the Scottish Parliament for West of Scotland (1 of 7 Regional MSPs)
- In office 6 May 1999 – 31 March 2003

Personal details
- Born: 3 December 1957 (age 68) Glasgow, Scotland
- Party: Scottish National Party
- Education: Glasgow University; Strathclyde University
- Profession: Librarian

Fiona Grace McLeod (born 3 December 1957) is a Scottish politician who served as acting Minister for Children and Young People from 2014 to 2015. A member of the Scottish National Party (SNP), she was Member of the Scottish Parliament (MSP) for Strathkelvin and Bearsden constituency from 2011 to 2016, having previously represented the West of Scotland region from 1999 to 2003.

== Background ==
She was born on 3 December 1957 in Glasgow, Scotland. She studied History at University of Glasgow, before gaining a Postgraduate Diploma in Librarianship at University of Strathclyde. She worked as a librarian at Glasgow North College of Nursing and the Marie Curie Huntershill Hospice. She was appointed to Ofcom's Scottish Advisory Committee from 2004 to 2006, and was a founding member of Westerton Junior Youth Club.

== Scottish Parliament ==
In the 1999 election she stood as a constituency candidate in Strathkelvin and Bearsden, where she was runner-up to Labour candidate Sam Galbraith. She had been placed fourth on the SNP's West of Scotland list, and was elected as a MSP through this route. She served as Deputy Party Spokesperson on the Environment.

Galbraith resigned his seat in 2001 but McLeod did not stand in the subsequent by-election as this would have meant resigning her seat. However she did contest the seat in the 2003 election but finished fourth, behind Jean Turner (an independent), Brian Fitzpatrick (who had won the by-election) and Jo Swinson (who would later become MP for part of the seat). She also only placed 7th on the SNP list for West of Scotland and so also lost her top-up place in parliament.

In the 2011 Scottish Parliament general election she won the constituency of Strathkelvin and Bearsden following the SNP landslide victory, defeating David Whitton on a swing of 7.7%.

She served as acting Minister for Children and Young People, from 18 December 2014 until 31 August 2015, during Aileen Campbell MSP's maternity leave. This was the first time that a Minister of the Scottish Government had taken maternity leave.

In May 2015, Mcleod announced that she would not be standing for re-election to Parliament the following year.

== After Parliament ==
In 2004, she became one of the first members of Ofcom's Advisory Committee for Scotland.

In November 2016 she was announced as a member of the Commission on Parliamentary Reform, having been nominated to represent the SNP.

In August 2017, the Scottish Book Trust appointed her as a member of its Board of Trustees.

== Personal life ==
McLeod is married with one son.
