= Uniting Church in Australia, Northern Synod =

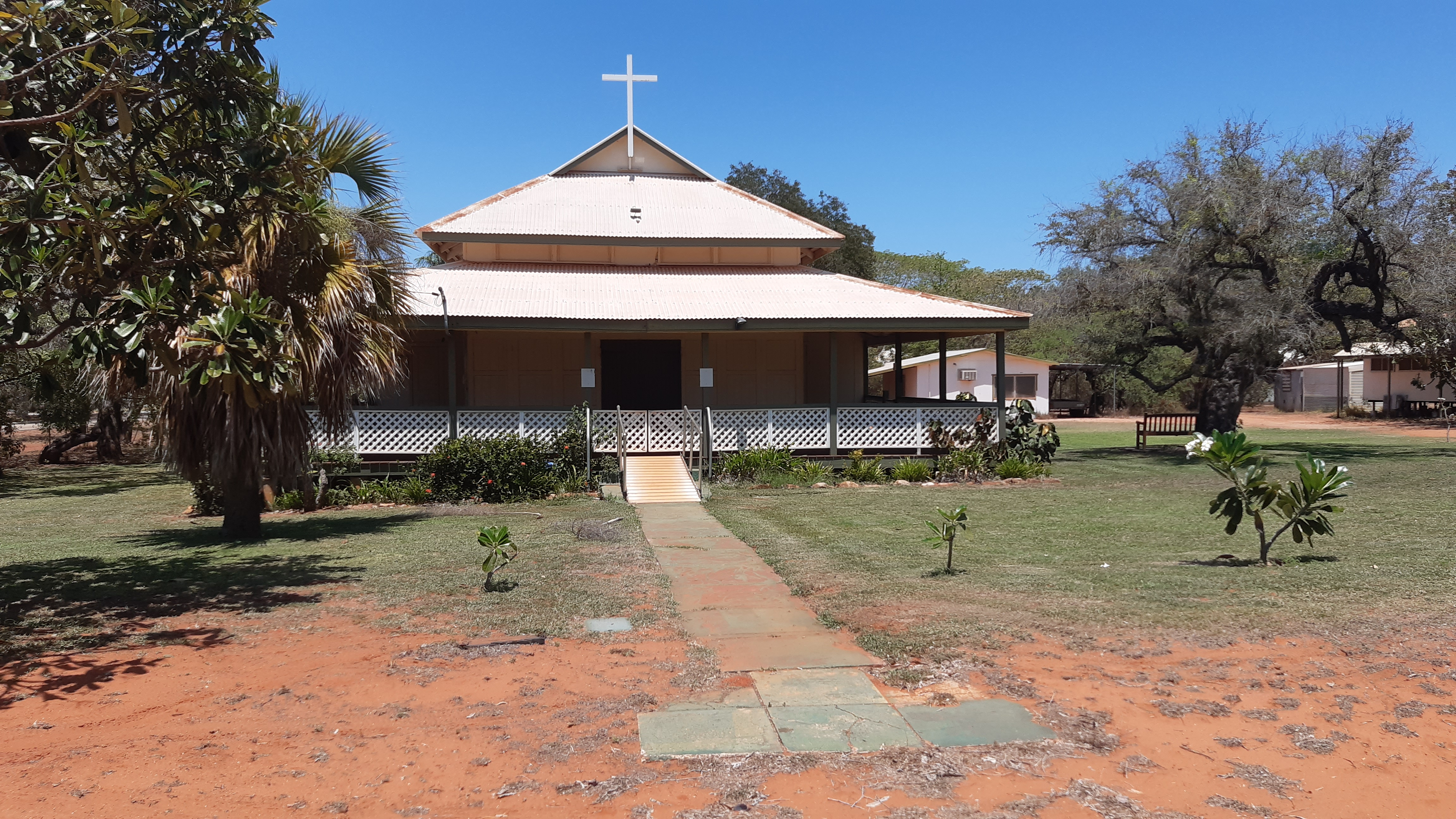
The Uniting Church in Broome, in the north of Western Australia

The Northern Synod is a regional council of the Uniting Church in Australia having responsibility for the congregations and presbyteries in the Northern Territory and the northern parts of Western Australia and South Australia. The moderator since 20 June 2015 is Rev Thresi Mauboy Wohangara. She succeeded Stuart McMillan in that role.

== Presbyteries ==
The Northern Synod consists of two presbyteries. These do not cover separate geographic areas; they represent Indigenous and non-Indigenous congregations.

=== Pilgrim Presbytery of Northern Australia ===
The Pilgrim Presbytery of Northern Australia has 15 non-indigenous congregations across the Northern Territory and northern Western Australia. It has oversight of five "patrol ministries", three of which are associated with congregations.

=== Northern Regional Council of Congress ===
The Northern Regional Council of Congress is a regional committee of the Uniting Aboriginal and Islander Christian Congress (UAICC) as well as being a presbytery of the Northern Synod. Its committee has representatives from over 28 Aboriginal Australian and Torres Strait Islander congregations.
