= Turnbull High School =

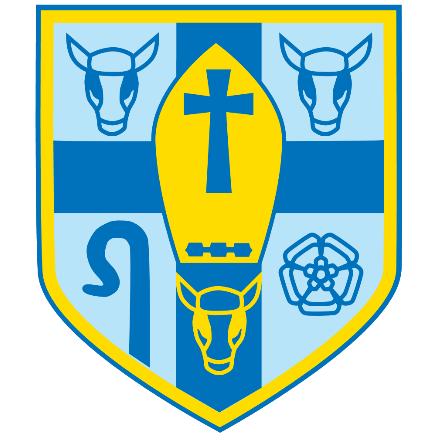

Location
- St. Mary’s Road; Bishopbriggs, East Dunbartonshire, G64 2EF; Scotland; 55.909°N 4.240°W

Information
- Type: Comprehensive Secondary School
- Motto: Respice Finem - Latin: (Look to the end)
- Religious affiliation: Roman Catholic
- Established: 1976
- Local authority: Strathclyde Regional Council (1976-1996); East Dunbartonshire Council (1996-)
- Chaplain: Fr. Mpagi Alex Kisasa
- Head Teacher: Ms Eileen Kennedy
- Staff: 62.7FTE
- Gender: Coeducational
- Age: 11 to 18
- Enrolment: c. 655
- Houses: St. Andrew; St. Kentigern; Marian; St. Teresa of Calcutta
- Colours: Royal Blue & Gold
- Publication: Turnbull Times
- Accreditation: Investors in People; Eco-School Green Flag; International School Award
- Courses: Standard Grade; Scottish Qualifications Certificate
- Website: http://www.turnbull.e-dunbarton.sch.uk/

Turnbull High School is a co-educational comprehensive secondary school located in Bishopbriggs, East Dunbartonshire, Scotland. The school was named after William Turnbull, Bishop of Glasgow from 1448 to 1454, and founder of the University of Glasgow in 1451, of which he was the first Chancellor. Whilst enrollment is open to pupils of all religious denominations and none, the School's religious ethos emphasises practice of Roman Catholic moral values both in the church and in the community, with its own Chaplain and many associated charitable and community-based activities undertaken.

The school's staff are appointed with the approval of the Archdiocese of Glasgow, in accordance with the Education (Scotland) Act 1918, which first established state support for Catholic schools. Turnbull is affiliated with the three Catholic Primary Schools in its Catchment area, St. Matthew's and St. Helen's in Bishopbriggs and pupils from Torrance who attend St. Machan's in Lennoxtown. Pupils from St. Nicolas', Bearsden and St. Joseph’s, Milngavie, also have an entitlement to places in Turnbull High School.

== History ==
The original school campus was constructed in 1974 by the Lanarkshire Education Authority Architects' Department to a design by Robert Forsyth. Initially intended as a satellite campus of what was then Bishopbriggs' only secondary school, the non-denominational Bishopbriggs High School, it was built on part of the former estate of the David Hamilton designed Kenmure House, birthplace of Sir William Stirling-Maxwell, which was demolished in 1955.

The school remained non denominational until 1976. The first two years were challenging as many of the buildings and school facilities were not completed. However the pupils achieved successful education results and staff from Bishopbriggs High School were seconded to teach classes until it formally became a Roman Catholic secondary school in 1976 under the new Strathclyde Regional Council. Desmond Ewing was appointed as the first head teacher of Turnbull High School with a full complement of full time teachers.

Turnbull High School initially only offered academic courses up to Ordinary Grade in fourth year. In 1978, it achieved full six year status and began to offer a comprehensive curriculum up to Higher Grade. Its catchment area also expanded to include pupils from the village of Torrance. The school's Parent-Teacher Association was formed in June 1988.

The school motto, Respice Finem, was adopted from the Latin manuscript, Gesta Romanorum, Chapter 103: Quidquid agas, prudenter agas, et respice finem, which means: Whatever you do, do cautiously, and look to the end. The three bull's heads featured on the school shield are based on the Coat of Arms of the Clan Turnbull.

Turnbull High School made news headlines in January 2025 when a group seven upper school pupils were caught on CCTV stealing luxury goods from a duty free store at Bergamo Airport in Italy after a ski-trip. Staff accompanying the group were reportedly forced to pay around 800 euros as the return flight was held on the runway.

== Former school buildings ==
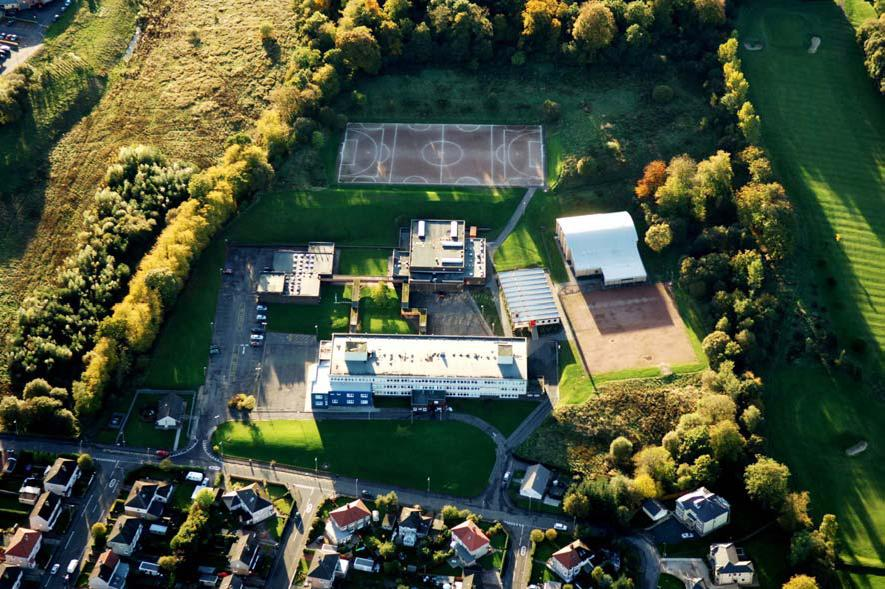
Aerial overview of the campus buildings at Turnbull High School prior to the April 2007 demolition work and construction beginning on the new school building.

The original main teaching block consisted of a three-storey building containing three Art and Design rooms, Social sciences, Religious Education, English and Modern languages classrooms, Science labs, ICT labs and Home Economics facilities. Administrative offices, the Oratory and Cafeteria were also housed in this building. An extension to the main building was opened in September 2002 and provided pupil recreational areas, offices, a staffroom, S6 Common room and a larger School library.

Two music studios, two music practice rooms and two indoor Gymnasia for PE were housed in an additional block along with the school auditorium. Another block housed the technical and graphic design department, consisting of a technical drawing room, a graphic design studio, a woodwork room, a metalwork room and a craft and design workshop. Both external buildings were linked to the main school building by covered walkways.

A modular annexe building was opened in October 1998, providing seven additional classrooms for mathematics and allowing adaptations to be made to rooms in the Main Building in order to enhance ICT and science laboratory facilities.

== New building ==
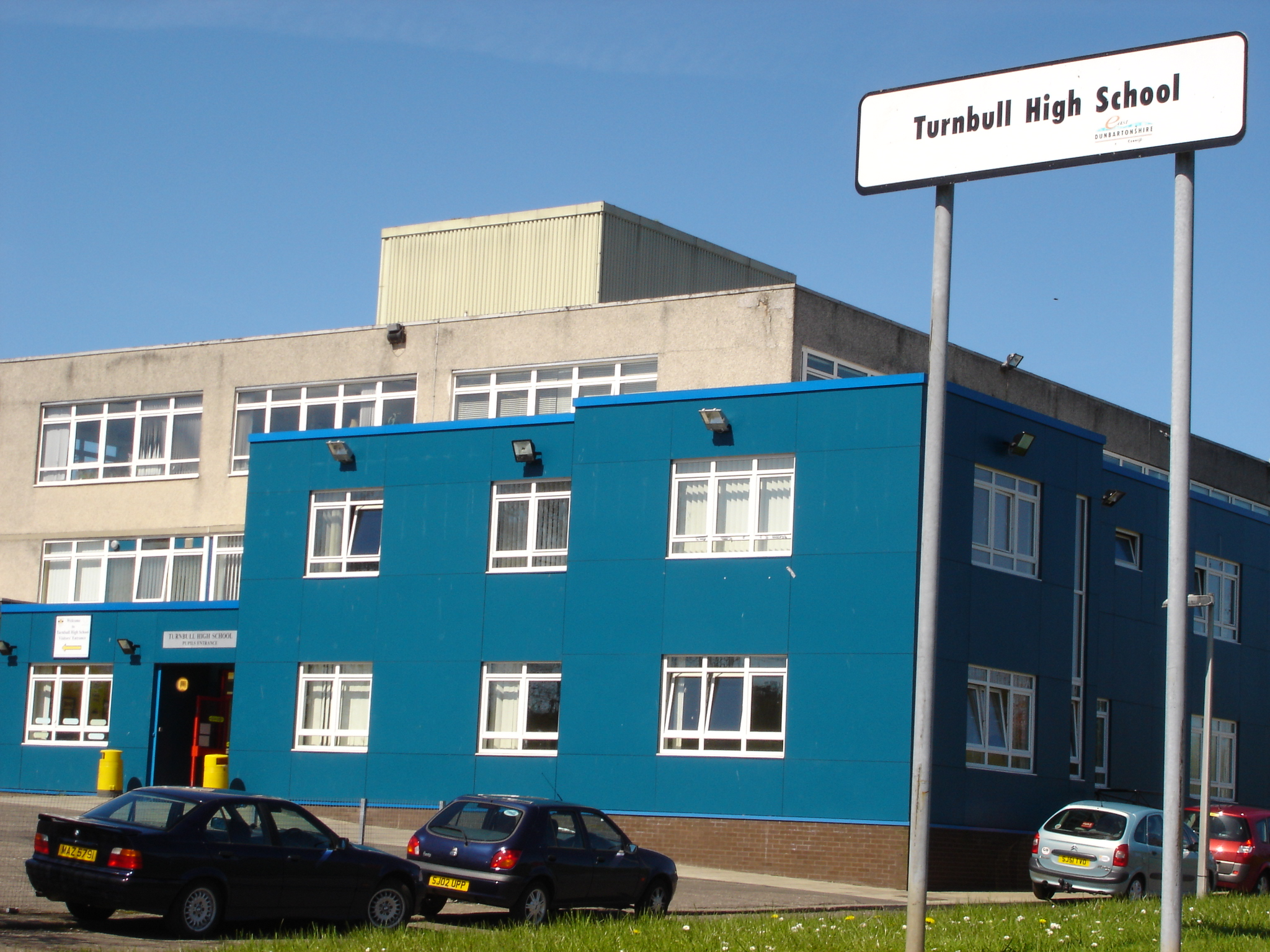
Main Building of Turnbull High School in 2007

In 2009 the original Turnbull High School buildings were replaced by a new building on the existing campus. This was undertaken as part of a £134 million East Dunbartonshire Council Public-Private Partnership project to build six new secondary schools. The new school was designed by SMC Parr, with construction carried out by Morgan Sindall. The school is operated on a 30-year Design, Build, Finance and Operate (DBFO) contract by a consortium including AMEC and John Laing.

=== Construction ===
From April 2007, the former Auditorium, Music and PE block was demolished and the Maths annexe relocated, in order to facilitate the start of construction on the new building. The school remained on site whilst the new building was constructed adjacent to the remaining buildings. The only original building that remains from the old school is the 2003 Games Hall, which has been expanded to house the entire PE department.

In order to adjust for the reduced capacity of the new school building, the roll was capped at 120 pupils in each year group, which was reduced from a potential maximum of 838 in the old buildings.

The new school building accommodates approximately 650 pupils in a single three-storey block. The main building consists of two wings of accommodation to the west and east, which are linked by a central atrium, housing an internal courtyard, the cafeteria, an auditorium and performance space.

=== Opening ===
The new building was completed for the start of the August 2009 term and was officially opened on 21 September 2009 by Councillor Una Walker, Education Convener of East Dunbartonshire Council. The new school building was subsequently blessed during a Mass held by the Archbishop of Glasgow, Mario Conti on 27 October 2009. The remaining original buildings were demolished during November 2009 and have been replaced by a landscaped area.

== Guidance ==
The school operates a guidance department which is organised into four House groups; St Andrew, St Kentigern, Marian and Mother Teresa.

== Notable former pupils ==
- Gerry Britton (born 1970), professional footballer, chief executive of Partick Thistle F.C.
- Alberto Costa (b. 1971), Conservative Member of Parliament for South Leicestershire (from 2015)
- Adam Harley, Liberal Democrat Member of the Scottish Parliament for Strathkelvin and Bearsden (2026–present)
- Stephen Maguire (b. 1981), professional snooker player
- Johnathan Rice (b. 1983), singer-songwriter
- James McFadden (b. 1983), professional footballer and Scotland international
- Gerry McLauchlan (b. 1989), professional footballer, Queens Park F.C.
- Paul Sweeney (b. 1989), Labour & Co-operative Member of Parliament for Glasgow North East and Shadow Under-Secretary of State for Scotland (2017–19), Member of the Scottish Parliament (2021–present)
- Frances Mayli McCann (b. 1989), actress
- Nicky Devlin (b. 1993), professional footballer, Livingston F.C.
