= Adam Harley =

Scottish politician

Adam Harley MSP
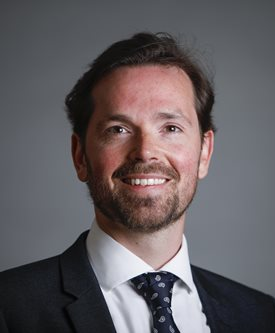
- Official portrait, 2026

Member of the Scottish Parliament for Strathkelvin and Bearsden
- Incumbent
- Assumed office 7 May 2026
- Preceded by: Rona Mackay
- Majority: 2,572 (6.5%)

Scottish Liberal Democrat portfolios
- 2026–present: Spokesperson for Health and Care

Personal details
- Party: Scottish Liberal Democrats
- Spouse: Sophia Carr-Gomm
- Website: Official website

Adam Harley is a Scottish politician who has served as the Member of the Scottish Parliament (MSP) for Strathkelvin and Bearsden since 2026, representing the Scottish Liberal Democrats.

== Career ==
=== Theatre and the arts ===
At the age of 18, Harley began a three-year training programme at the Royal Academy of Dramatic Art (RADA) in London. He subsequently worked for approximately five years as a professional actor in film, television and theatre, including work for the BBC and writing and performing at the Edinburgh Festival Fringe.

=== Celebrant ===
Following his acting career, Harley trained as an independent celebrant through the School of Celebrancy, conducting weddings, baby namings, funerals and other life ceremonies across Scotland and England.

=== Charity sector ===
Harley moved into the charity sector, working for the Cystic Fibrosis Trust and campaigning for people with cystic fibrosis to access life-saving medicines. The Trust led a campaign over several years which ultimately secured NHS access to the CFTR modulator drug Kaftrio and related treatments for eligible patients across all four UK nations between 2020 and 2024. Harley also volunteered with organisations educating children from disadvantaged backgrounds, worked with community groups supporting young people at risk of involvement in the criminal justice system, and ran workshops in schools to help children improve their reading and writing.

=== Parliamentary staff ===
Before standing for election, Harley worked for several years as Head of Office for Alex Cole-Hamilton, leader of the Scottish Liberal Democrats and MSP for Edinburgh Western. During this period he gave his first speech at the Liberal Democrats federal conference in Brighton in autumn 2024, speaking about the impact of the two-child benefit cap on families in Scotland. In early 2025 he also spoke at the Scottish Liberal Democrats Spring Conference in Inverness, supporting a motion on better provision for young carers within education.

== Political career ==
=== 2024 UK general election ===
Harley was the Liberal Democrat candidate for Cumbernauld and Kirkintilloch at the 2024 United Kingdom general election, finishing sixth with 1,294 votes.

=== 2026 Scottish Parliament election ===
In March 2025, Harley was announced as the Scottish Liberal Democrat candidate for the Strathkelvin and Bearsden constituency, a key target seat for the party which significantly overlaps with the Mid Dunbartonshire Westminster constituency won by Liberal Democrat Susan Murray by almost 10,000 votes at the 2024 general election. He was also named as the Liberal Democrat lead candidate on the West Scotland regional list.

During the campaign Harley knocked on more than 40,000 doors across the constituency, which the party described as one of the biggest campaigns in Scotland. He worked closely alongside Susan Murray MP throughout the campaign, and the party had also recently won a council by-election in Bearsden South, strengthening its local base ahead of the vote.

At the election on 7 May 2026, Harley was elected as MSP for Strathkelvin and Bearsden, defeating the SNP's Denis Johnston. The result was declared at 5.26 pm on 8 May 2026 by Constituency Returning Officer Ann Davie. The full result was:

2026 Scottish Parliament election: Strathkelvin and Bearsden
| Party | Candidate | Votes | % | ±% |
|---|---|---|---|---|
| Liberal Democrats | Adam Harley | 15,697 | 39.5 | ▲25.1 |
| SNP | Denis Johnston | 13,125 | 33.0 | ▼12.5 |
| Reform | Faten Hameed | 4,154 | 10.4 | New |
| Labour | Colette McDiarmid | 4,678 | 11.8 | ▼6.6 |
| Conservative | Pam Gosal | 2,122 | 5.3 | ▼15.4 |
| Majority | | 2,572 | 6.5 | N/A |
| Total valid votes | | 39,776 | | |
| Rejected ballots | | 177 | | |
| Turnout | | 39,953 | 63.0 | ▼9.0 |
| Liberal Democrats gain from SNP | | | | |

It was the first time the Liberal Democrats had won the Strathkelvin and Bearsden seat since the constituency was created. The result represented a substantial improvement on the fourth-place finish Susan Murray had recorded in the 2021 Scottish Parliament election, when she polled 6,675 votes; Harley polled 15,697 in 2026. The victory was part of the Scottish Liberal Democrats' best result since 2007, with the party winning ten seats across Scotland, a gain of six on their 2021 total.

== Personal life ==
Harley grew up in Cumbernauld and Bishopbriggs, East Dunbartonshire, where he attended Turnbull High School.
