= 2001 Strathkelvin and Bearsden by-election =

By-election in Strathkelvin and Bearsden, Scotland

The 2001 Strathkelvin and Bearsden by-election was a by-election held for the Scottish Parliament constituency of Strathkelvin and Bearsden on 7 June 2001, the same day as the UK general election and also a Scottish Parliament by-election in Banff and Buchan. It was caused by the resignation for health reasons of the constituency's MSP, Sam Galbraith.

The Labour Party retained the seat with Brian Fitzpatrick winning for them. He faced a strong challenge from Dr. Jean Turner who stood as an "independent" candidate trying to save the local Stobhill Hospital. Turner would later stand against Fitzpatrick at the 2003 election for the Scottish Parliament and defeat him.

== Result ==
Strathkelvin and Bearsden by-election, 2001
Party	Candidate	Votes	%	±%
Labour	Brian Fitzpatrick	15,401	37.0	−13.7
Save Stobhill Hospital	Dr Jean Turner	7,572	18.2	New
Liberal Democrats	John Morrison	7,147	17.2	+7.4
SNP	Janet Law	6,457	15.5	−6.6
Conservative	Charles Ferguson	5,037	12.1	−4.3
Majority		7,829	18.8	−9.8
Turnout		41,614		
Labour Co-op hold		Swing		

== Scottish Parliament election result, 1999 ==
Srathkelvin and Bearsden election, 1999
Party	Candidate	Votes	%	±%
Labour	Sam Galbraith	21,505	50.7	
SNP	Fiona McLeod	9,384	22.1	
Conservative	Charles Ferguson	6,934	16.4	
Liberal Democrats	Anne Howarth	4,144	9.8	
Anti-Drug (Independent)	Maxi Richards	423	1.0	
Majority		12,121	28.6	
Turnout		42,390		
Labour Co-op win (new seat)				

== See also ==
- Strathkelvin and Bearsden (Scottish Parliament constituency)
- Elections in Scotland
- List of by-elections to the Scottish Parliament
