= Inverclyde (Scottish Parliament constituency) =

Constituency of the Scottish Parliament

- County constituency for the Scottish Parliament
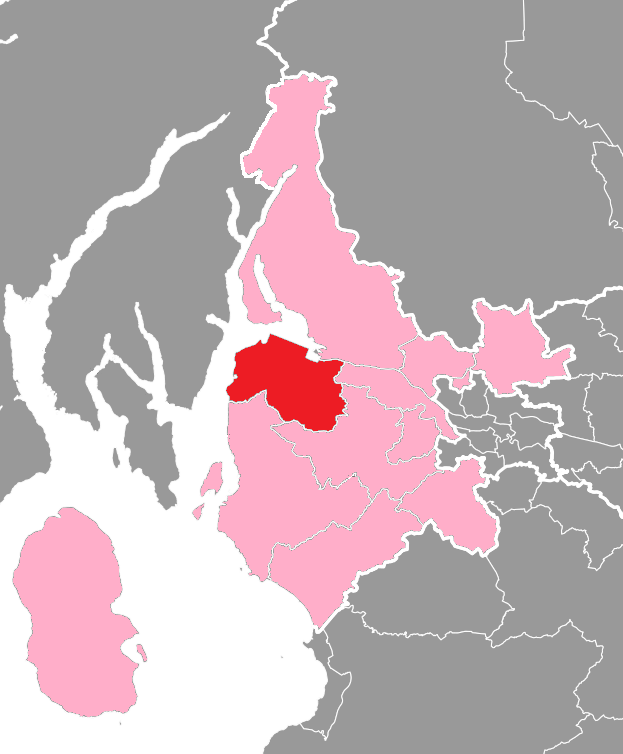

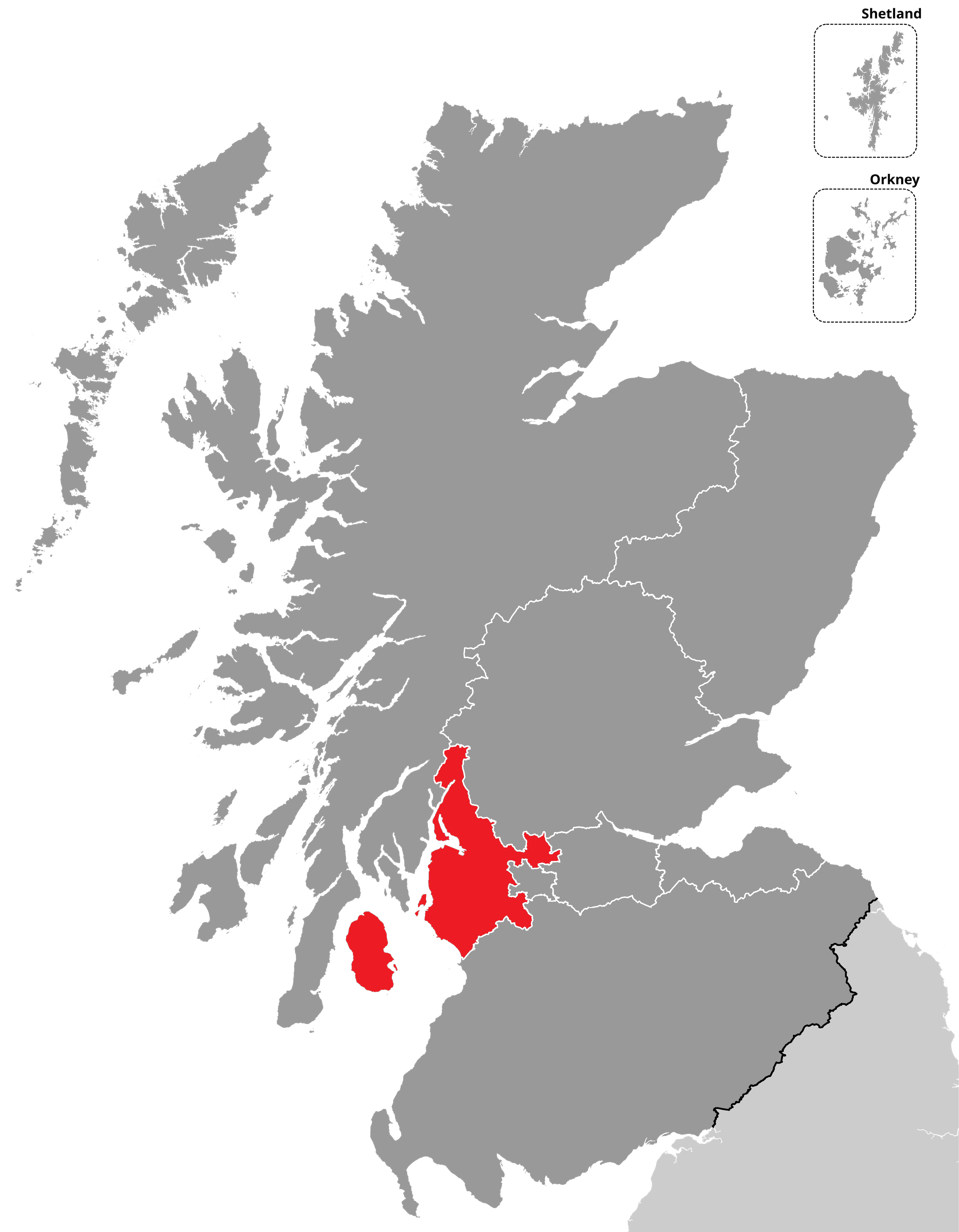
- Inverclyde shown within the West Scotland electoral region and the region shown within Scotland
- Electoral region: West Scotland
- Population: 78,880 (2024)
- Electorate: 62,118 (2026)
- Major settlements: Greenock, Port Glasgow, Gourock, Kilmacolm

Current constituency
- Created: 2026
- Seats: 1
- Party: Scottish National Party
- MSP: Stuart McMillan
- Council area: Inverclyde
- Created from: Greenock and Inverclyde

Inverclyde is a county constituency of the Scottish Parliament covering the entire council area of Inverclyde. Under the additional-member electoral system used for elections to the Scottish Parliament, it elects one Member of the Scottish Parliament (MSP) by the first past the post method of election. It is also one of ten constituencies in the West Scotland electoral region, which elects seven additional members, in addition to the ten constituency MSPs, to produce a form of proportional representation for the region as a whole.

The seat was created by the Second Periodic Review of Scottish Parliament Boundaries in 2025, and was first contested at the 2026 Scottish Parliament election. It replaced the former Greenock and Inverclyde, which was abolished at this review. It also includes the village of Kilmacolm, which was formerly in the Renfrewshire North and West constituency.

The current member is Stuart McMillan of the Scottish National Party (SNP), who was previously the member for Greenock and Inverclyde.

== Electoral region ==
The other nine constituencies of the West Scotland region are: Cunninghame North, Cunninghame South, Clydebank and Milngavie, Dumbarton, Eastwood, Paisley, Renfrewshire North and Cardonald, Renfrewshire West and Levern Valley, and Strathkelvin and Bearsden. The region covers the whole of the council areas of East Dunbartonshire, East Renfrewshire, Inverclyde, North Ayrshire, Renfrewshire, and West Dunbartonshire; and parts of the council areas of Argyll and Bute, East Ayrshire, and Glasgow.

== Constituency boundaries and council area ==
The Inverclyde constituency is coterminous with the Inverclyde council area. It covers all the electoral wards of the Inverclyde Council in full.

== Election results ==
=== 2020s ===
2026 Scottish Parliament election: Inverclyde
Party	Candidate	Constituency			Regional		
Party	Candidate	Votes	%	±%	Votes	%	±%
SNP	Stuart McMillan (Note: Incumbent member for the Greenock and Inverclyde constituency)	14,193	44.3	N/A	11,319	35.2	N/A
Labour	Francesca Brennan	8,876	27.7	N/A	6,720	20.9	N/A
Reform	Malcolm Offord (Note: Elected on the party list)	5,649	17.6	N/A	5,701	17.7	N/A
Green					3,320	10.3	N/A
Liberal Democrats	Jamie Greene (Note: Incumbent member on the party list, or for another constituency)	1,954	6.1	N/A	1,546	4.8	N/A
Conservative	Ted Runciman	1,351	4.2	N/A	1,770	5.5	N/A
Scottish Family					275	0.9	N/A
Scottish Socialist					248	0.8	N/A
Independent Green Voice					225	0.7	N/A
AtLS					212	0.7	N/A
Socialist Labour					210	0.7	N/A
ISP					202	0.6	N/A
Liberal					150	0.5	N/A
ADF					95	0.3	N/A
Independent	William Wallace				53	0.2	N/A
Scottish Libertarian					35	0.1	N/A
UKIP					22	0.1	N/A
Scottish Common Party					18	0.1	N/A
Independent	Paddy McCarthy				15	0.0	N/A
Independent	Paul Mack				2	0.0	N/A
Majority		5,317	16.6	N/A			
Valid votes		32,023			32,138		
Invalid votes		158			104		
Turnout		32,181	51.8	N/A	32,242	51.9	N/A
SNP win (new boundaries)							

== See also ==
- List of Scottish Parliament constituencies and electoral regions (2026–)
