= Commission on Parliamentary Reform =

The Commission on Parliamentary Reform was an independent group, established in October 2016 by Ken Macintosh, the Presiding Officer of the Scottish Parliament. It is chaired by John McCormick and published its report, with recommendations, on 20 June 2017.

== Background ==
When the Scottish Parliament was set up in 1999, a Consultative Steering Group developed some of the parliamentary structures and procedures. Changes in technology since the Parliament was formed have affected how civil society engages with it. Macintosh’s predecessor Tricia Marwick had also tried to look at how the parliament functioned.

== Remit and schedule ==
The Commission was asked to consider how the Parliament scrutinises legislation, how the committee system functions and the extent of the parliament's independence from the Scottish government.

The commission met for first time on 7 November 2016. In January the committee took evidence from two former Labour First Ministers Jack McConnell and Henry McLeish. The Commission will publish its report, with recommendations to the Presiding Officer, on Tuesday 20 June 2017 at 10.00 am.

== Commission membership ==
John McCormick was announced as chair, ahead of his retirement from the Electoral Commissioner for Scotland in December 2016.

Other members of the commission were:

- Katie Burke MSYP
- Pam Duncan-Glancy, disability, equality and human rights activist
- Very Rev Dr Lorna Hood, former Moderator of the General Assembly of the Church of Scotland
- Geoff Mawdsley, director of Reform Scotland
- Professor Boyd Robertson, Principal of Sabhal Mòr Ostaig, UHI, the National Centre for Gaelic Language and Culture

The commission had support from all the party leaders in the Scottish Parliament. The members nominated by their parties to sit on the commission are:

- Fiona McLeod, former Scottish National Party MSP
- Jackson Carlaw, Scottish Conservative and Unionist Party MSP
- Johann Lamont, Scottish Labour MSP
- John Finnie, Scottish Green Party MSP
- Jeremy Purvis, former Scottish Liberal Democrats MSP (October-December 2016)
- John Edward, Scottish Liberal Democrats, former Head of the European Parliament Office in Scotland (January-June 2017)

== Recommendations ==
There were recommendations around the effective use of chamber time, included ceasing the practice of using scripted diary questions from party leaders to open First Minister's Questions (FMQs). The report suggested scrapping the requirement for selected questions to be published ahead of the session and granting the Presiding Officer the power to rule out questions "which do other than seek to genuinely scrutinise the minister".
