= First Minister's Questions (Scottish Parliament) =

Parliamentary accountability mechanism

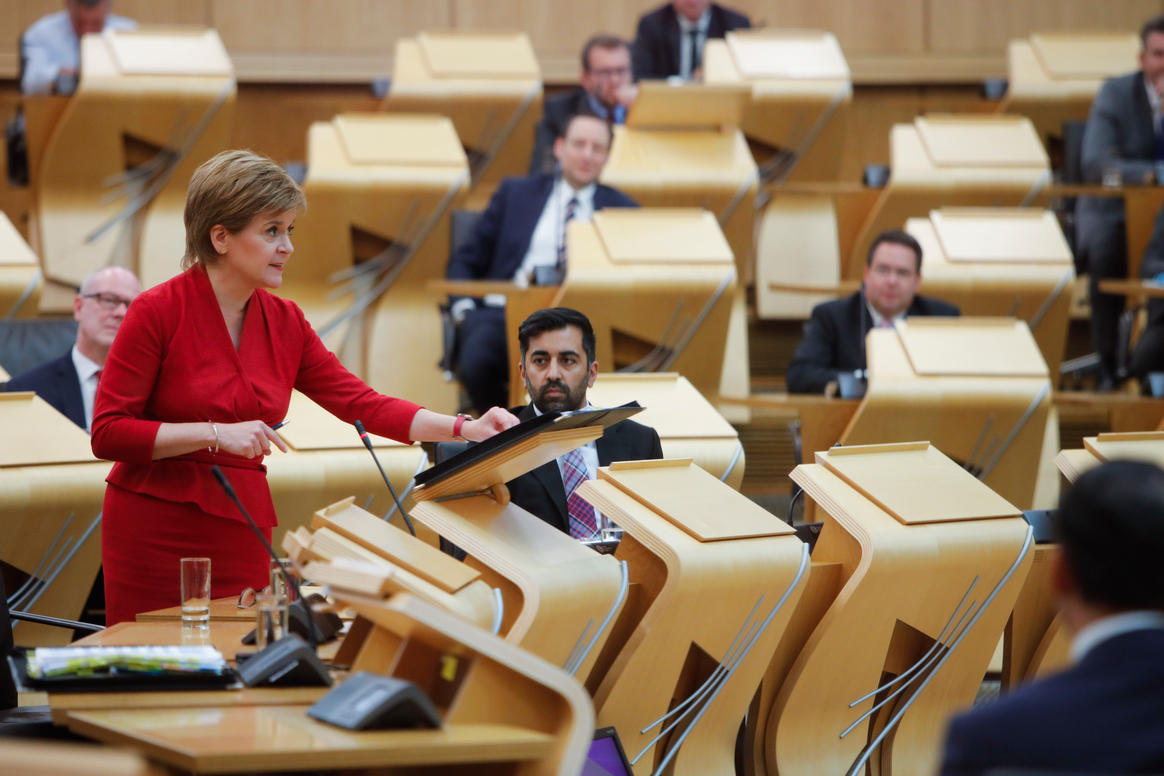
First Minister Nicola Sturgeon answering questions at a session of FMQs on 2 September 2021. Sturgeon's eventual successor, Humza Yousaf, is seated to her left.

First Minister's Questions (FMQs) is the name given to the weekly questioning of the First Minister in the Scottish Parliament. It serves the purpose of holding the Scottish Government to account and the format has evolved over time. First Minister's Questions follows in some of the traditions of Prime Minister's Questions in the House of Commons. Other devolved administrations in the United Kingdom also have sessions for the question times of their leaders that take the same name. An independent report published in 2017 suggested further reforms.

== Procedure and format ==
There are rules and procedures about who can submit a question. The Presiding Officer selects questions from all of those lodged by Members of the Scottish Parliament (MSPs).

== History ==
=== Establishment of parliament ===
In 1999, during the 1st Scottish Parliament, the procedures committee recommended that a specific First Minister’s Question Time be set up, to last for up to twenty minutes out of the hour set aside for the questioning of Ministers. There were lively encounters between the First Minister, Donald Dewar and the then leader of the Scottish National Party, Alex Salmond. The Parliament's first Presiding Officer Sir David Steel had reservations about the format, describing it as "something of a caricature of Prime Minister’s Question Time”.

=== Recent history ===
While First Minister, Jack McConnell expressed views about seeing changes to how the Scottish Parliament functioned. In May 2003, at the beginning of the 2nd Scottish Parliament, McConnell wrote to Presiding Officer George Reid, to ask for various changes in how business was conducted in the Scottish Parliament. He requested a shake-up of FMQs, including the session being held earlier in the day as school parties visiting Parliament often had to leave before the end of the session. He also wished for FMQs to run for longer and allowing back-benchers to be given more time to ask supplementary questions. He sought for the leaders of the Greens and the Scottish Socialist Party to be allocated to ask questions every two weeks, after their parties made electoral gains. In a written response, Reid proposed extending the length of FMQs from twenty to thirty minutes. In January 2004, FMQs was moved to midday, from a 3.10pm slot. The BBC reported an initial fall in viewing figures following the move. The numbers of questions asked varied, with some leaders speaking at length, which left few opportunities for back-bench politicians to ask questions.

In May 2011, as the 4th Scottish Parliament got underway, Presiding Officer Tricia Marwick announced changes to give backbench MSPs more involvement. This quickly resulted in the shortest exchange at FMQs between the First Minister and the leader of the largest opposition party since early 2007, with eleven back-benchers asking questions or supplementaries.

In May 2016, at the start of the 5th Scottish Parliament, MSPs approved a trial period where the length of the session was extended to 45 minutes. The longer sessions were seen as a positive move, with the atmosphere less rushed and more opportunities being given to backbenchers. In June 2017 the Commission on Parliamentary Reform reported and considered FMQs as part of this. There were recommendations around the effective use of chamber time, included ceasing the practice of using scripted diary questions from party leaders to open First Minister’s Questions (FMQs). The report suggested scrapping the requirement for selected questions to be published ahead of the session and granting the Presiding Officer the power to rule out questions "which do other than seek to genuinely scrutinise the minister".

In May 2026, from the beginning of the 7th Scottish Parliament, First Minister's Questions was split into two 30 minute sessions: First Ministers' Question Time (Party Leaders) on Thursdays and First Ministers' Question Time (Back-bench Members) on Tuesdays. In addition, questions stopped being published in advance of First Ministers' Questions.

== Leaders involved in First Minister's Questions ==
Party key	Scottish National Party
Party key	Conservative
Party key	Labour
Party key	Scottish Green Party
Party key	Liberal Democrats
Party key	Scottish Socialist Party
Party key	Reform UK

Session	First Minister	Leader of the largest opposition party		Leader of the 2nd largest opposition party	Leader of the 3rd largest opposition party	Leader of the 4th largest opposition party	Leader of the 5th largest opposition party	Years
1	Donald Dewar	Alex Salmond		David McLetchie	None			1999–2000
1	Donald Dewar	John Swinney		David McLetchie	None			2000
1	Jim Wallace	John Swinney		David McLetchie	None			2000
1	Henry McLeish	John Swinney		David McLetchie	None			2000–2001
1	Jim Wallace	John Swinney		David McLetchie	None			2001
2	Jack McConnell	John Swinney		David McLetchie	None			2001–2004
2	Jack McConnell	Nicola Sturgeon		David McLetchie	Robin Harper	Tommy Sheridan	None	2004–2005
2	Jack McConnell	Nicola Sturgeon		Annabel Goldie	Robin Harper	Colin Fox	None	2005–2007
3	Alex Salmond	Jack McConnell		Annabel Goldie	Nicol Stephen	Robin Harper	None	2007–2008
3	Alex Salmond	Wendy Alexander		Annabel Goldie	Nicol Stephen	Robin Harper	None	2008
3	Alex Salmond	Wendy Alexander		Annabel Goldie	Tavish Scott	Robin Harper	None	2008
3	Alex Salmond	Iain Gray		Annabel Goldie	Tavish Scott	Patrick Harvie	None	2008–2011
4	Alex Salmond	Iain Gray		Annabel Goldie	Willie Rennie	Patrick Harvie	None	2011
4	Alex Salmond	Iain Gray		Ruth Davidson	Willie Rennie	Patrick Harvie	None	2011
4	Alex Salmond	Johann Lamont		Ruth Davidson	Willie Rennie	Patrick Harvie	None	2011–2014
4	Alex Salmond	Iain Gray		Ruth Davidson	Willie Rennie	Patrick Harvie	None	2014
4	Nicola Sturgeon	Iain Gray		Ruth Davidson	Willie Rennie	Patrick Harvie	None	2014
4	Nicola Sturgeon	Kezia Dugdale		Ruth Davidson	Willie Rennie	Patrick Harvie	None	2014–2016
5	Nicola Sturgeon	Ruth Davidson		Kezia Dugdale	Patrick Harvie; Alison Johnstone	Willie Rennie	None	2016–2017
5	Nicola Sturgeon	Ruth Davidson		Richard Leonard	Patrick Harvie; Alison Johnstone	Willie Rennie	None	2017–2019
5	Nicola Sturgeon	Jackson Carlaw		Richard Leonard	Patrick Harvie; Alison Johnstone	Willie Rennie	None	2019–2020
5	Nicola Sturgeon	Ruth Davidson		Richard Leonard	Patrick Harvie; Alison Johnstone	Willie Rennie	None	2020–2021
5	Nicola Sturgeon	Ruth Davidson		Anas Sarwar	Patrick Harvie; Alison Johnstone	Willie Rennie	None	2021
6	Nicola Sturgeon	Douglas Ross		Anas Sarwar	Patrick Harvie; Lorna Slater	Alex Cole-Hamilton	None	2021–2023
6	Humza Yousaf	Douglas Ross		Anas Sarwar	Patrick Harvie; Lorna Slater	Alex Cole-Hamilton	None	2023–2024
6	John Swinney	Russell Findlay		Anas Sarwar	Patrick Harvie; Lorna Slater	Alex Cole-Hamilton	None	2024–2025
6	John Swinney	Russell Findlay		Anas Sarwar	Ross Greer; Gillian Mackay	Alex Cole-Hamilton	None	2025–2026
7	John Swinney	Anas Sarwar	Malcolm Offord	Ross Greer; Gillian Mackay	Russell Findlay	Alex Cole-Hamilton	None	2026
7	John Swinney	Jackie Baillie	Malcolm Offord	Ross Greer; Gillian Mackay	Russell Findlay	Alex Cole-Hamilton	None	2026
7	John Swinney	Michael Marra	Malcolm Offord	Ross Greer; Gillian Mackay	Russell Findlay	Alex Cole-Hamilton	None	2026
7	John Swinney	Michael Marra		Malcolm Offord	Ross Greer; Gillian Mackay	Russell Findlay	Alex Cole-Hamilton	2026–present
