= Gil Paterson =

Scottish politician (born 1942)

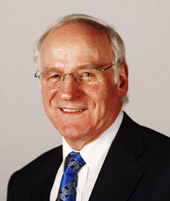

Convenor of SNP Scottish Parliamentary Group
- In office 17 May 2007 – 25 March 2021
- Preceded by: Stewart Stevenson

Member of the Scottish Parliament for Clydebank and Milngavie
- In office 5 May 2011 – 5 May 2021
- Preceded by: Des McNulty
- Succeeded by: Marie McNair

Member of the Scottish Parliament for West of Scotland (1 of 7 Regional MSPs)
- In office 3 May 2007 – 22 March 2011

Member of the Scottish Parliament for Central Scotland (1 of 7 Regional MSPs)
- In office 6 May 1999 – 31 March 2003

Personal details
- Born: 11 November 1942 (age 83) Springburn, Glasgow, Scotland
- Party: Scottish National Party

Gilbert Martin Paterson (born 1942) is a Scottish National Party (SNP) politician, who served as the Member of the Scottish Parliament (MSP) for Clydebank and Milngavie, from 2011 to 2021. Previously he had been an MSP for the West of Scotland region, having been elected on 3 May 2007. From 1999 to 2003 he was an MSP for Central Scotland.

== Career ==
Brought up in Springburn in the North of Glasgow, Paterson attended Possilpark Secondary School, before building up his own business Gil's Motor Factors. He served as a Scottish National Party (SNP) councillor in Strathclyde Regional Council and sat on the SNP's National Executive Committee, before being elected as one of five SNP MSPs for Central Scotland in the first election to the Scottish Parliament. During the first parliamentary term he sat on both the Local Government and Procedures committees in the Parliament.

At the 2003 election, only three SNP MSPs were returned for Central Scotland and Paterson lost his seat in Parliament. He returned to running his business but stayed active in the SNP, becoming the party's vice-convenor in charge of fundraising, a position he had held previously.

Paterson was one of the heaviest critics of the leadership style of John Swinney, and in the aftermath of the 2004 European election he openly called for Swinney's resignation, which happened shortly afterwards.

In 2006, Paterson was selected to stand as candidate for the Clydebank and Milngavie Scottish Parliamentary constituency.

In the 2016-2021 session of the Scottish Parliament, Paterson was elected as the SNP Group convener. He is also a member of two committees, 'European and External Relations' and 'Subordinate Legislation', the latter of which he is deputy-convener.

In August 2020, Paterson announced that he would be stepping down as an MSP at the 2021 Scottish Parliament election. Writing in the Clydebank Post, he said, "I shall not be seeking re-election in May due to personal circumstances. This was a decision I took very reluctantly, after a long period of reflection."

== Ideological positions ==
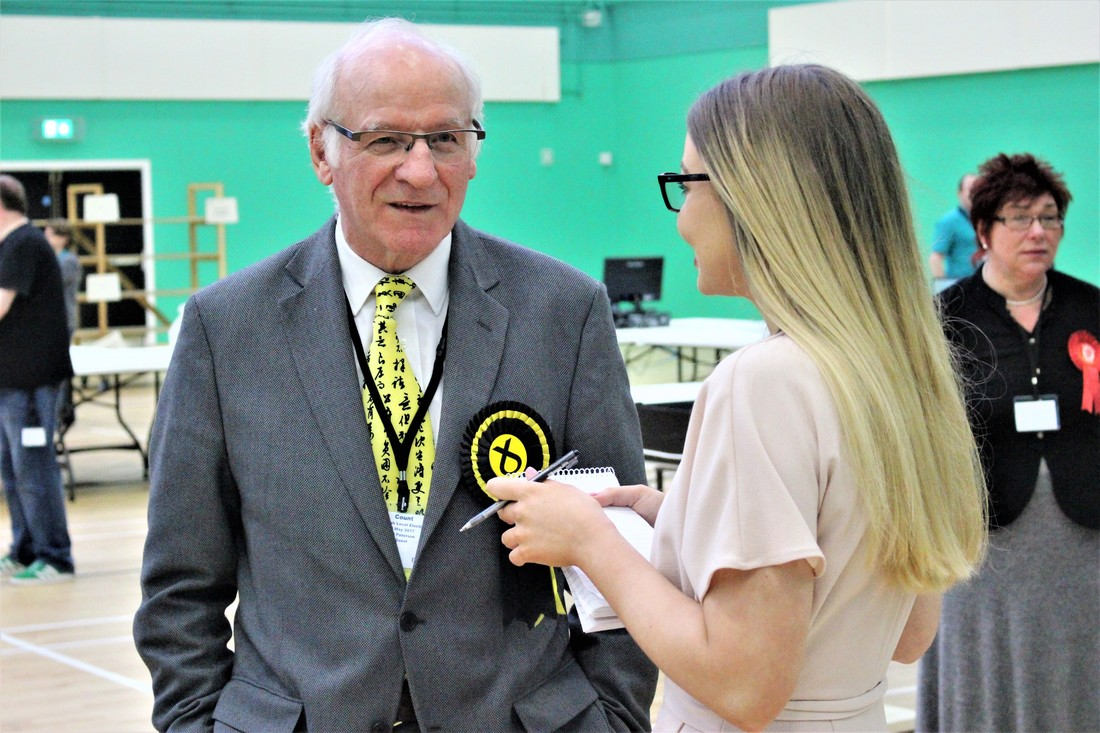
Paterson gave interviews to reporters about the result in the West Dunbartonshire constituency in the 2017 general election.

=== Brexit ===
Paterson voted Remain in the June 2016 referendum on the United Kingdom's EU membership. He was active in raising Brexit concerns for business and economics in Scotland, including questioning First Minister Nicola Sturgeon at First Minister's Questions in the Scottish Parliament.

=== Free tuition ===
Mr Paterson is a supporter of free tuition fees in Scotland, and appeared in the Milngavie and Bearsden Herald in August 2017 asking for clarity from East Dunbartonshire MP Jo Swinson, a Liberal Democrat, about her stance following comments made by her party leader, Vince Cable, in The Press and Journal.

Scottish Parliament
Preceded by Des McNulty	Member of the Scottish Parliament for Clydebank and Milngavie; 2011–2021	Succeeded by Marie McNair
