= David Whitton =

Scottish politician (born 1952)

- David Whitton MSP (right) with Hilary Benn MP and Councillor Una Walker

Member of the Scottish Parliament for Strathkelvin and Bearsden
- In office 3 May 2007 – 22 March 2011
- Preceded by: Jean Turner
- Succeeded by: Fiona McLeod
- Majority: 3,388 (9.3%)

Personal details
- Born: 22 April 1952 (age 74) Forfar, Scotland
- Party: Scottish Labour Party
- Spouse: married
- Children: two
- Profession: Journalist
- Website: davidwhittonmsp.org.uk

David Whitton (born 22 April 1952) is a Scottish journalist, Labour Party politician and former Member of the Scottish Parliament (MSP). He was elected to the Scottish Parliament for Strathkelvin and Bearsden in 2007, defeating the incumbent Independent MSP Jean Turner, and losing the seat at the 2011 election to Fiona McLeod of the Scottish National Party.

== Background ==
Whitton was educated at the Morgan Academy in Dundee. He began his journalistic career with D. C. Thomson in 1970 before moving to the Fife Free Press and then the Evening Express in Aberdeen, specialising in local government activities. He worked at The Scotsman in Glasgow for three years then moved to the Daily Record where he became Industrial Editor in 1983. From 1986 to 1996, Whitton worked at Scottish Television in a variety of roles including producer of news and current affairs programmes, Lobby Correspondent at Westminster, presenter of political programming and on screen news reporter. He was Head of Public Affairs from 1994 to 1996. Whitton's time at Scottish Television was followed by a short period as a Director of the PR company, Media House. David Whitton is married and has two children and two grandchildren. He is a member of the National Union of Journalists.

== Political career ==
In 1999 Whitton became Special Adviser to the then Scottish Secretary Donald Dewar. Whitton was a member of Scottish Labour Party's Scottish Parliament election campaign responsible for organising broadcasting coverage and media activity for the Party leader.

Following the first Scottish Parliament elections, Whitton became Special Adviser to the First Minister of Scotland, Donald Dewar and Official Spokesman for the First Minister and the Scottish Executive. Whitton delivered a reading at Dewar's funeral at Glasgow Cathedral on 18 October 2000.

In 2000, Whitton established his own public affairs consultancy with clients including Scottish Enterprise, The Scottish Council for Development and Industry, The Al‑Maktoum Institute for Arabic and Islamic Studies.

== Member of the Scottish Parliament ==
Whitton was elected to the Scottish Parliament in May 2007 for the constituency of Strathkelvin and Bearsden becoming Parliamentary Aide to Wendy Alexander MSP until her resignation as party leader on 28 June 2008. In addition to a position as Deputy Labour Party Spokesperson on Finance, he was a substitute member of the Economy, Energy and Tourism Committee, Member of the Finance Committee, a member of the Labour Trade Union Group, and a board member of the Scottish Parliamentary Business Exchange. In 2010/11 Whitton claimed more than £34,000 in expenses which was the sixth highest amount at the Scottish Parliament.

In the SNP landslide victory in the 2011 Scottish Parliament election, he lost his seat to Fiona McLeod, on a swing of 7.7%.

== Career timeline ==
- Rathfern Road Primary, London, (1957–63)
- Forest Hill School, London, 1963
- Morgan Academy, Dundee (1963–70)
- Journalist, Dundee Courier, Fife Free Press, Kirkcaldy and Evening Express, Aberdeen (1970–78)
- Reporter, The Scotsman, (1978–81)
- Industrial Reporter, Daily Record (1981–83)
- Industrial Editor, Daily Record, (1983–86)
- Reporter, presenter, producer, Scottish Television (1986–94)
- Head of Public Affairs, Scottish Television (1994–96)
- Director, Media House (1996–98)
- Special Adviser to Donald Dewar, First Minister (1998–2000)
- managing director, Whitton PR Ltd (2000–2007)
- Member of the Scottish Parliament (2007–2011)

Scottish Parliament
Preceded by Jean Turner	Member of the Scottish Parliament for Strathkelvin and Bearsden; 2007–2011	Succeeded by Fiona McLeod
