= Duncan McNeil =

British politician (born 1950)

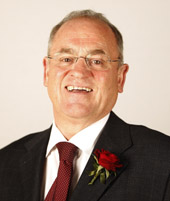
- Official portrait, 2011

Convener of the Health and Sport Committee
- In office 15 June 2011 – 24 March 2016
- Preceded by: Christine Grahame
- Succeeded by: Neil Findlay

Member of the Scottish Parliament for Greenock and Inverclyde
- In office 6 May 1999 – 24 March 2016
- Preceded by: Constituency Created
- Succeeded by: Stuart McMillan

Personal details
- Born: 7 September 1950 (age 76) Greenock, Scotland
- Party: Scottish Labour Party
- Website: https://duncanmcneil.com/

Duncan McNeil (born 7 September 1950) is a Scottish Labour Party politician. He was the Member of the Scottish Parliament (MSP) for the Greenock and Inverclyde constituency from 1999 until 2016.

== Career ==
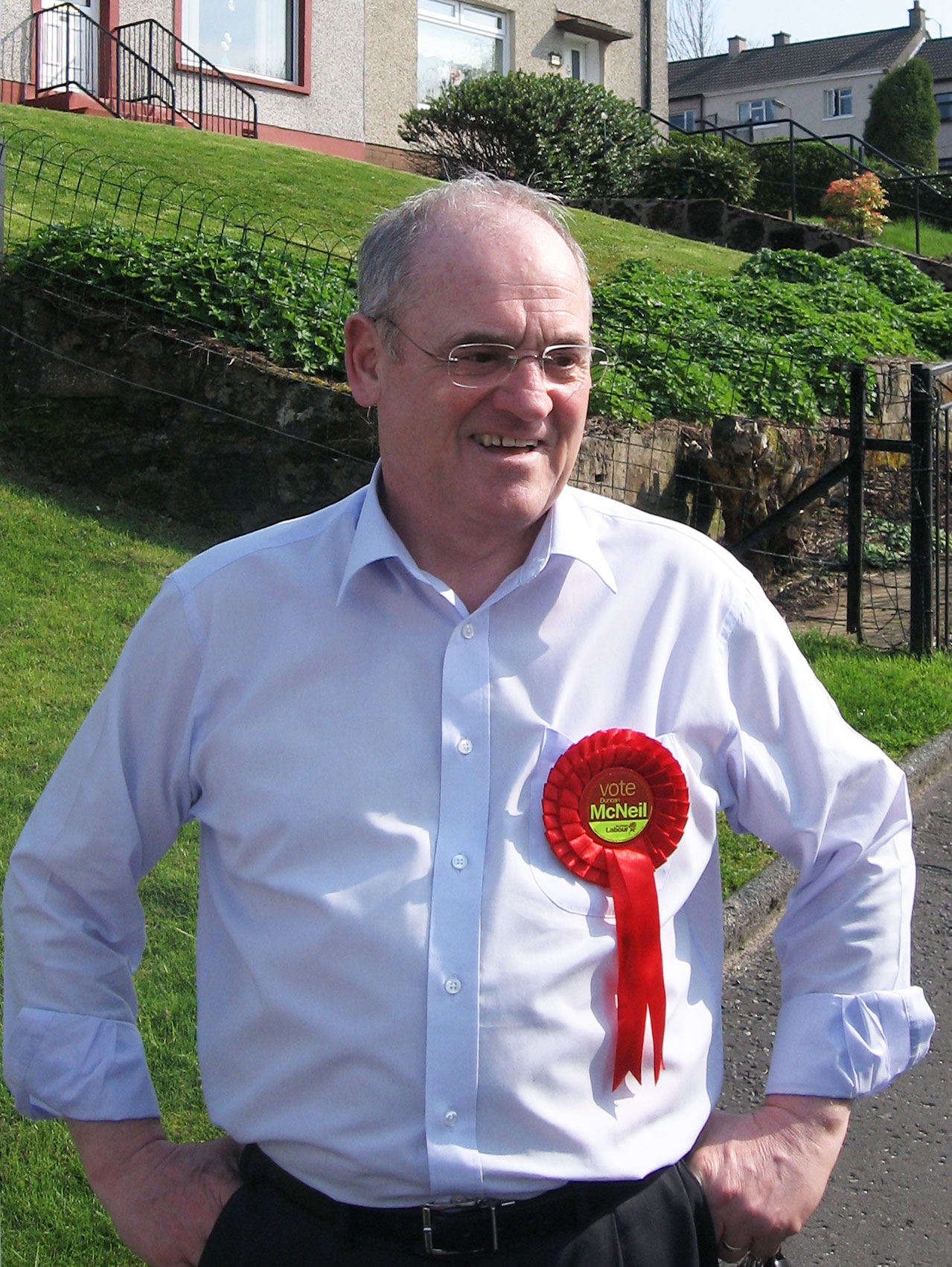
McNeil campaigning in Greenock

Born in Greenock, McNeil worked as a boilermaker at Scott Lithgow from 1965 to 1979, initially as an apprentice. After working as a co-ordinator for the Unemployed Workers Centres in Glasgow he became a full-time official in the GMB Union in 1981 and later a regional organiser.

For six years prior to his election from his current constituency, in May 1999, he was on the Labour Party's Scottish Executive Committee.

McNeil served on the Enterprise and Lifelong Learning Committee for 15 months and went on to become Labour's Chief Whip. He was elected to the Scottish Parliamentary Corporate Body in December 2001.

Following re-election in May 2003, Mr McNeil departed the Whips' Office to be Chair of the Scottish Parliamentary Labour Party. Additionally, he became convener of the Local Government and Communities Committee.

He caused controversy in 2006 when suggesting in a parliamentary debate that oral contraceptives should be added to prescribed methadone for drug addicts in order to limit the number of children born to parents with a history of substance abuse.

He has been a vocal campaigner for tougher penalties for knife crime and for better support and protection for vulnerable children.

Scottish Parliament
| New parliament Scotland Act 1998 | Member of the Scottish Parliament for Greenock and Inverclyde; 1999–2016 | Succeeded by Stuart McMillan |
