= Strathkelvin and Bearsden (Scottish Parliament constituency) =

Region or constituency of the Scottish Parliament

- County constituency for the Scottish Parliament
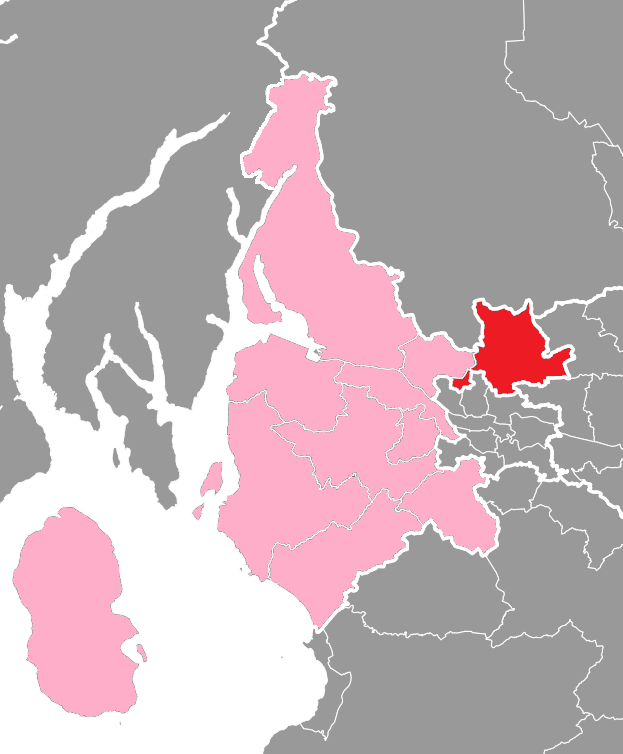

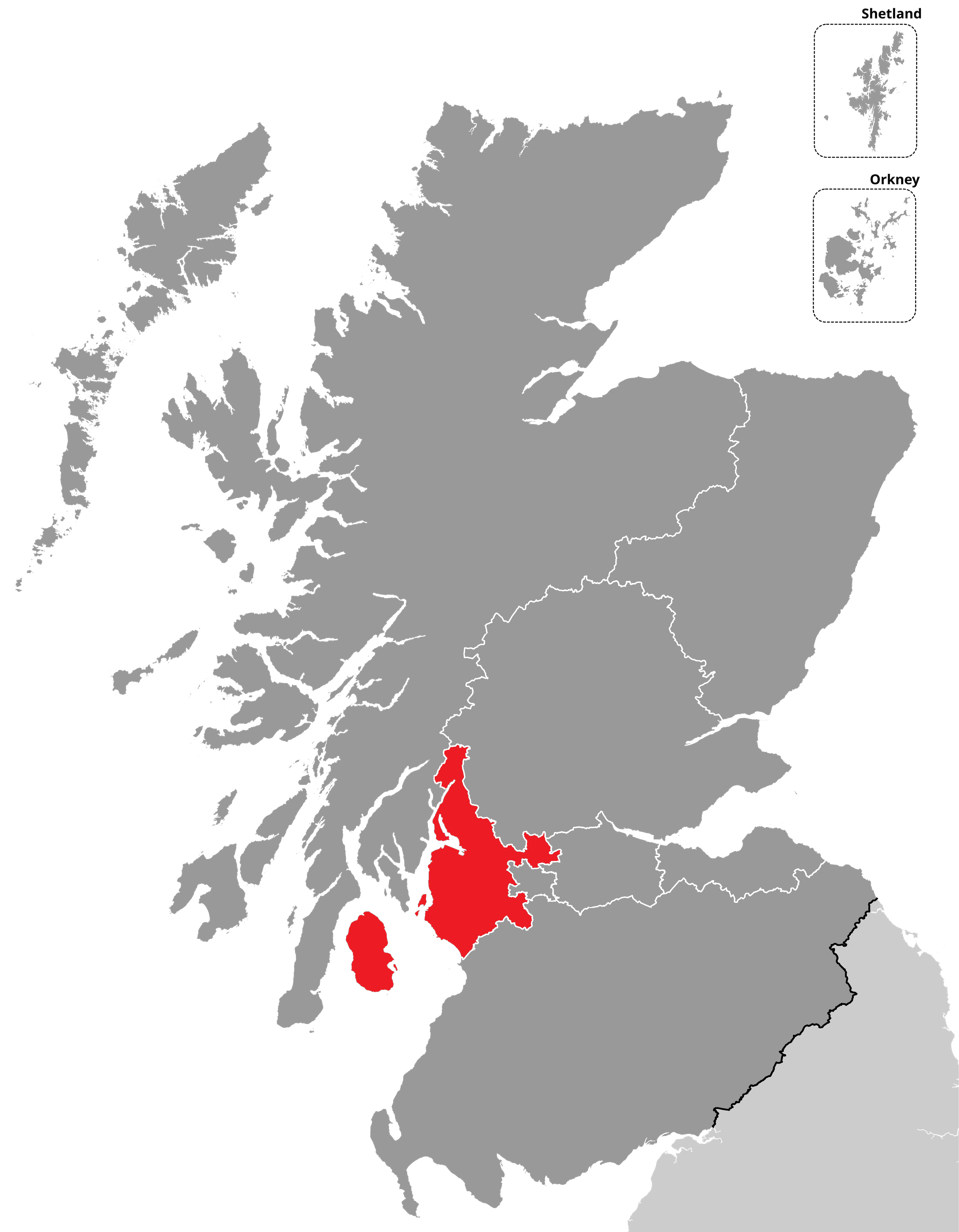
- Strathkelvin and Bearsden shown within the West Scotland electoral region and the region shown within Scotland
- Electoral region: West Scotland
- Electorate: 63,417 (2026)

Current constituency
- Created: 1999
- Party: Scottish Liberal Democrats
- MSP: Adam Harley
- Council area: East Dunbartonshire

Strathkelvin and Bearsden is a county constituency of the Scottish Parliament covering part of the council area of East Dunbartonshire. Under the additional-member electoral system used for elections to the Scottish Parliament, it elects one Member of the Scottish Parliament (MSP) by the first past the post method of election. It is also one of ten constituencies in the West Scotland electoral region, which elects seven additional members, in addition to the ten constituency MSPs, to produce a form of proportional representation for the region as a whole.

The seat has been held by Adam Harley of the Scottish Liberal Democrats since the 2026 Scottish Parliament election.

== Electoral region ==
The other nine constituencies of the West Scotland region are: Clydebank and Milngavie, Cunninghame North, Cunninghame South, Dumbarton, Eastwood, Inverclyde, Paisley, Renfrewshire North and Cardonald, and Renfrewshire West and Levern Valley. The region covers the whole of the council areas of East Dunbartonshire, East Renfrewshire, Inverclyde, North Ayrshire, Renfrewshire, and West Dunbartonshire; and parts of the council areas of Argyll and Bute, East Ayrshire, and Glasgow.

== Constituency boundaries and council area ==
Map of boundaries from 2011

The Strathkelvin and Bearsden constituency was created at the same time as the Scottish Parliament, for the 1999 Scottish Parliament election, with the name and boundaries of the existing Strathkelvin and Bearsden constituency of the UK House of Commons. Ahead of the 2005 United Kingdom general election the House of Commons constituencies in Scotland were altered, whilst the existing Scottish Parliament constituencies were retained, and there is now no longer any link between the two sets of boundaries. The boundaries of the seat were altered slightly by the First Periodic Review of Scottish Parliament Boundaries in 2011, but were left unchanged at the Second Periodic Review of Scottish Parliament Boundaries in 2025.

The rest of East Dunbartonshire is represented by the Clydebank and Milngavie constituency.

The electoral wards of East Dunbartonshire Council used in the current creation of Strathkelvin and Bearsden are:

- Bearsden South
- Bishopbriggs North and Campsie
- Bishopbriggs South
- Kirkintilloch East and North and Twechar
- Lenzie and Kirkintilloch South

== Member of the Scottish Parliament ==
Election	Member	Party
1999	Sam Galbraith	Labour
2001	Brian Fitzpatrick	Labour
2003	Jean Turner	Independent
2007	David Whitton	Labour
2011	Fiona McLeod	SNP
2016	Rona Mackay	SNP
2026	Adam Harley	Liberal Democrats

== Election results ==
=== 2020s ===
2026 Scottish Parliament election: Strathkelvin and Bearsden
Party	Candidate	Constituency			Regional		
Party	Candidate	Votes	%	±%	Votes	%	±%
Liberal Democrats	Adam Harley	15,697	39.5	▲25.1	9,471	23.7	▲14.9
SNP	Denis Johnston	13,125	33.0	▼12.5	9,513	23.8	▼12.9
Reform	Faten Hameed	4,154	10.4	New	5,587	14.0	▲13.9
Labour	Colette McDiarmid	4,678	11.8	▼6.6	5,440	13.6	▼6.0
Green					4,944	12.4	▲4.1
Conservative	Pam Gosal (Note: Incumbent member on the party list, or for another constituency)	2,122	5.3	▼15.4	3,012	7.5	▼14.5
Liberal					467	1.2	New
Scottish Family					300	0.8	▲0.1
Independent Green Voice					255	0.6	Steady
AtLS					228	0.6	New
Scottish Socialist					172	0.4	New
Socialist Labour					148	0.4	New
ISP					146	0.4	New
ADF					96	0.2	New
Independent	William Wallace				60	0.2	New
Scottish Libertarian					40	0.1	New
UKIP					23	0.1	Steady
Independent	Paddy McCarthy				21	0.1	N/A
Scottish Common Party					19	0.0	New
Independent	Paul Mack				5	0.0	New
Majority		2,572	6.5	N/A			
Valid votes		39,776			39,947		
Invalid votes		177			105		
Turnout		39,953	63.0	▼9.0	40,052	63.2	▼9.0
Liberal Democrats gain from SNP		Swing					
Notes

2021 Scottish Parliament election: Strathkelvin and Bearsden
Party	Candidate	Constituency			Regional		
Party	Candidate	Votes	%	±%	Votes	%	±%
SNP	Rona Mackay (Note: Incumbent member for this constituency)	21,064	45.5	▲2.0	17,026	36.7	▼1.1
Conservative	Andrew Polson	9,580	20.7	▼2.2	10,225	22.0	▼2.5
Labour Co-op	Callum McNally	8,510	18.4	▼2.7	9,104	19.6	▲0.6
Liberal Democrats	Susan Murray	6,675	14.4	▲1.9	4,099	8.8	▲0.4
Green					3,873	8.3	▲1.7
Alba					677	1.5	New
All for Unity					412	0.9	New
Scottish Family	Liam McKechnie	415	0.9	New	304	0.7	New
Independent Green Voice					263	0.6	New
Abolish the Scottish Parliament					95	0.2	New
Freedom Alliance (UK)					84	0.2	New
Reform					61	0.1	New
Scottish Libertarian					44	0.1	New
TUSC					32	0.1	New
UKIP					31	0.1	▼1.6
Renew					27	0.1	New
Independent	James Morrison				18	0.0	New
Independent	Maurice Campbell				10	0.0	New
Scotia Future					6	0.0	New
Majority		11,484	24.8	▲4.2			
Valid votes		46,244			46,391		
Invalid votes		119			74		
Turnout		46,363	72.0	▲9.1	46,465	72.2	▲9.3
SNP hold		Swing					

=== 2010s ===
2016 Scottish Parliament election: Strathkelvin and Bearsden
Party	Candidate	Constituency			Regional		
Party	Candidate	Votes	%	±%	Votes	%	±%
SNP	Rona Mackay	17,060	43.5	▲1.3	14,862	37.8	▼4.2
Conservative	Andrew Polson	8,960	22.9	▲9.8	9,646	24.5	▲12.0
Labour	Margaret Mccarthy	8,288	21.1	▼15.8	7,466	19.0	▼10.7
Liberal Democrats	Katy Gordon	4,880	12.5	▲4.8	3,295	8.4	▲3.0
Green					2,603	6.6	▲2.8
UKIP					657	1.7	▲1.0
Scottish Christian					312	0.8	▼0.3
Solidarity					268	0.7	▲0.5
RISE					167	0.4	New
Scottish Libertarian					57	0.1	New
Majority		8,100	20.6	▲15.3			
Valid votes		39,188			39,333		
Invalid votes		173			62		
Turnout		39,361	62.9	▲5.8	39,395	62.9	▲5.8
SNP hold		Swing					
Notes

2011 Scottish Parliament election: Strathkelvin and Bearsden
Party	Candidate	Constituency			Regional		
Party	Candidate	Votes	%	±%	Votes	%	±%
SNP	Fiona McLeod	14,258	42.2	N/A	14,187	42.0	N/A
Labour	David Whitton (Note: Incumbent member for this constituency)	12,456	36.9	N/A	10,032	29.7	N/A
Conservative	Stephanie Fraser	4,438	13.1	N/A	4,236	12.5	N/A
Liberal Democrats	Gordon Macdonald	2,600	7.7	N/A	1,807	5.4	N/A
Green					1,282	3.8	N/A
All-Scotland Pensioners Party					508	1.5	N/A
Scottish Christian					376	1.1	N/A
Socialist Labour					342	1.0	N/A
UKIP					249	0.7	N/A
BNP					227	0.7	N/A
Scottish Socialist					185	0.5	N/A
Solidarity					56	0.2	N/A
Independent	Richard Vassie				30	0.1	N/A
Others					247	0.7	N/A
Majority		1,802	5.3	N/A			
Valid votes		33,752			33,764		
Invalid votes		149			118		
Turnout		33,901	57.1	N/A	33,882	57.1	N/A
SNP win (new seat)							

=== 2000s ===
2007 Scottish Parliament election: Strathkelvin and Bearsden
Party	Candidate	Votes	%	±%
Labour	David Whitton	11,396	31.1	+1.2
SNP	Robin Easton	8,008	21.9	+8.2
Independent	Jean Turner	6,742	18.4	−12.7
Conservative	Stephanie Fraser	5,178	14.2	+2.9
Liberal Democrats	Cathy McInnes	4,658	12.7	−1.3
Scottish Christian	Bob Handyside	613	1.7	New
Majority		3,388	9.2	N/A
Turnout		36,595	60.6	
Labour gain from Independent		Swing		

2003 Scottish Parliament election: Strathkelvin and Bearsden
Party	Candidate	Votes	%	±%
Independent	Jean Turner	10,988	31.1	N/A
Labour	Brian Fitzpatrick	10,550	29.9	−20.8
Liberal Democrats	Jo Swinson	4,950	14.0	+4.2
SNP	Fiona McLeod	4,846	13.7	−8.4
Conservative	Rory O'Brien	4,002	11.3	−5.1
Majority		438	1.2	N/A
Turnout		35,336		
Independent gain from Labour		Swing		

Scottish Parliament by-election, 2001: Strathkelvin and Bearsden
Party	Candidate	Votes	%	±%
Labour	Brian Fitzpatrick	15,401	37.0	−13.7
Independent	Jean Turner	7,572	18.2	New
Liberal Democrats	John Morrison	7,147	17.2	+7.4
SNP	Janet Law	6,457	15.5	−6.6
Conservative	Charles Ferguson	5,037	12.1	−4.3
Majority		7,829	18.8	−9.8
Turnout		41,614		
Labour hold		Swing		

=== 1990s ===
1999 Scottish Parliament election: Strathkelvin and Bearsden
Party	Candidate	Votes	%	±%
Labour	Sam Galbraith	21,505	50.7	N/A
SNP	Fiona McLeod	9,384	22.1	N/A
Conservative	Charles Ferguson	6,934	16.4	N/A
Liberal Democrats	Anne Howarth	4,144	9.8	N/A
Anti-Drug	Maxi Richards	423	1.0	N/A
Majority		12,121	28.6	N/A
Turnout		49,324		N/A
Labour win (new seat)				
