= Jean Turner =

British politician (born 1939)

Member of the Scottish Parliament for Strathkelvin and Bearsden
- In office 1 May 2003 – 2 April 2007
- Preceded by: Brian Fitzpatrick
- Succeeded by: David Whitton

Personal details
- Born: 23 December 1939 (age 86) Glasgow, Scotland
- Party: Independent
- Education: University of Aberdeen
- Profession: medical doctor

Jean McGivern Turner (born 23 December 1939) is a Scottish medical doctor and former Independent politician. She was the Member of the Scottish Parliament (MSP) for the Strathkelvin and Bearsden constituency from 2003 until 2007.

== Early life and education ==
Turner was born in Glagow on 23 December 1939. She attended Hillhead High School before going on to study medicine at the University of Aberdeen, graduating with an MBChB in 1965.

== Career ==
=== Medical career ===
After qualifying as a doctor, she worked as an anaesthetist registrar at the Southern General Hospital, then for 25 years as a general practitioner in the Springburn area in Glasgow.

In August 2007, she was appointed as chief executive of the Scotland Patients Association.

=== Political career ===
In 2001, a range of services at Stobhill Hospital were under threat and a "Save Stobhill" campaign had emerged. In March 2001 the constituency MSP for Strathkelvin and Bearsden, Sam Galbraith announced his resignation for health reasons, triggering a in the Strathkelvin and Bearsden Holyrood by-election of 2001. By April 44,000 had signed a petition. At the age of 61, having recently retired as a general practitioner, Turner entered the by-election as the independent "Save Stobhill" candidate. In that race, she finished second with 7,572 votes or 18%. She also campaigned against Labour's treatment of the NHS.

In October 2002, she confirmed that she would stand as candidate at the elections the following year. In the 2003 Scottish parliamentary elections, she stood again in Strathkelvin and Bearsden on the same platform she used in 2001. This time, Turner won the seat with 10,988 votes or 31%. She finished ahead of Labour's Brian Fitzpatrick, who was previously head of policy in Donald Dewar's policy unit.

She sat on the Health Committee during her time as a MSP.

In February 2007, Turner announced she would stand for re-election at the 2007 Scottish Parliament election, but lost her seat to the Labour candidate, David Whitton.

== See also ==
Other doctors elected on similar platforms:

- Richard Taylor
- Kieran Deeny

Scottish Parliament
Preceded by Brian Fitzpatrick	Member of the Scottish Parliament for Strathkelvin and Bearsden; 2003–2007	Succeeded by David Whitton
