= Rona Mackay =

Scottish National Party politician

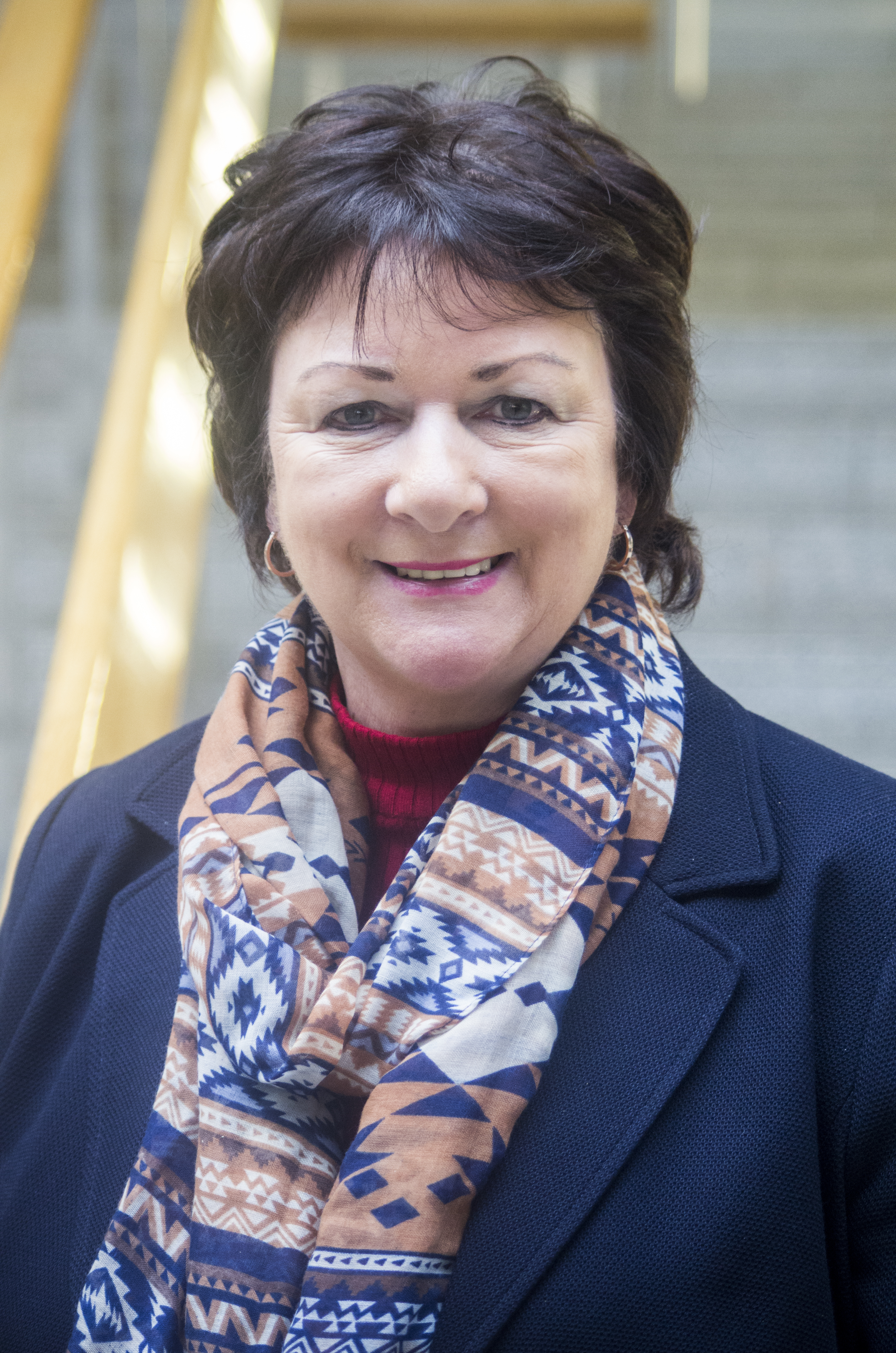

Member of the Scottish Parliament for Strathkelvin and Bearsden
- In office 5 May 2016 – 9 April 2026
- Preceded by: Fiona McLeod
- Succeeded by: Adam Harley

Personal details
- Party: Scottish National Party
- Website: www.ronamackay.scot

Rona Mackay is a Scottish National Party (SNP) politician who served as the Member of the Scottish Parliament (MSP) for Strathkelvin and Bearsden from 2016 to 2026.

== Early life and education ==
Press coverage locates Mackay’s roots in East Dunbartonshire, where she is routinely described as the local MSP for Kirkintilloch and its surrounds.

Before entering politics, she spent more than two decades as a journalist on Scottish national newspapers and as a columnist for Independence magazine.

From 2010 to 2016 she sat on the Children's Panel for the East End of Glasgow.

In 2001 she was a co-ordinator of Chernobyl Children's Lifeline, a charity which brought children from Belarus who were affected by the nuclear disaster to Scotland to improve their health.

== Political career ==
Mackay worked as a Parliamentary Assistant to Gil Paterson, the former SNP MSP for Milngavie and Clydebank, before being elected in May 2016. She was elected with a majority of 8,100 votes. She was Deputy Convenor of the Justice Committee in Session 5, was on the Education Committee and convened a number of Cross Party Groups.

During the fifth session of Holyrood, she was deputy convener of the Justice Committee and hosted the Traverse Theatre’s Locker Room Talk performance in Parliament to stimulate debate on misogyny and harassment.

At the Scottish Parliamentary election in May 2021, Mackay was re-elected with a majority of 11,484 (3,384 increase from 2016). In Session 6, she is a member of the Scottish Parliament's Criminal Justice Committee, a member of the Animal Welfare, Chronic Pain (Co-Convenor), Women’s Justice (Convenor), Fair Trade, Men's Violence Against Women and Children, Prevention and Healing of Adverse Childhood Experiences and is a Senior Party Whip. She also backed the government’s pilot of jury-only rape trials, urging that the scheme be time-limited and rigorously evaluated.

Mackay has been a supporter of the Assisted Dying for Terminally Ill Adults (Scotland) Bill, calling it “a cautious, evidence-based step forward” at its stage-one debate in 2025.

On 25 February 2025, Mackay announced she would stand down at the 2026 Scottish Parliament election.

Scottish Parliament
Preceded by Fiona McLeod	Member of the Scottish Parliament for Strathkelvin and Bearsden; 2016–2026	Succeeded by Adam Harley
