= Stuart McMillan =

Scottish National Party politician

Stuart McMillan MSP
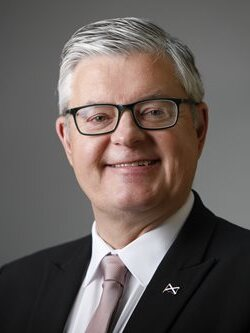
- Official Portrait, 2026

Convener of the Climate Action Committee
- Incumbent
- Assumed office 10 June 2026

Member of the Scottish Parliament for Inverclyde Greenock and Inverclyde (2016–2026)
- Incumbent
- Assumed office 5 May 2016
- Preceded by: Duncan McNeil
- Majority: 5,317 (16.6%)

Member of the Scottish Parliament for West Scotland
- In office 3 May 2007 – 24 March 2016
- Preceded by: Campbell Martin
- Succeeded by: Ken Macintosh

Personal details
- Born: 6 May 1972 (age 54) Barrow in Furness, England
- Party: Scottish National Party
- Education: Abertay University
- Website: www.stuartmcmillan.scot

Stuart McMillan (born 6 May 1972) is a Scottish politician who is the current convener of the Climate Action Committee. A member of the Scottish National Party (SNP), he has been the Member of the Scottish Parliament (MSP) for the Greenock and Inverclyde since 2016, having previously represented the West of Scotland region from 2007 to 2016.

== Early life ==
Stuart McMillan was born in Barrow in Furness in Cumbria, England, on 6 May 1972. He moved to Inverclyde when he was a child, where he attended Port Glasgow High School. After attending Central College of Commerce, Glasgow, he studied at the University of Abertay in Dundee where he graduated with a BA (Hons) in European Business Management with Languages and latterly an MBA. After graduation he worked for IBM, before working for Scottish National Party central office in Westminster. Before being elected in 2007, he was office manager to Scottish National Party Member of the Scottish Parliament Bruce McFee.

== Parliamentary career ==
In 2007 Scottish Parliament election he stood as the SNP candidate for Greenock and Inverclyde constituency, beaten by Labour's Duncan McNeil but was then elected on the regional list for the West of Scotland region. He contested the seat again in the 2011 election which McNeil won with a majority of 511 and McMillan also returned to parliament through the regional list. Stuart was elected as the MSP for Greenock & Inverclyde on 5 May 2016 with a 53.7% vote share and a majority of 8,230, becoming the first SNP member to win this constituency at the Scottish Parliament.

During his time as an MSP, Stuart has led campaigns on a number of issues in Inverclyde including a campaign to reduce the price of fuel in the area, improving the trunk road network, increasing marine tourism and tackling drug misuse. He has also been very vocal in his support for action to be taken against the rise of fixed-odds betting terminals, securing a victory in 2018 when the UK Government finally agreed to limit the maximum stake to £2. In 2014, McMillan led a Members' Debate in the Scottish Parliament calling on the Scottish and Westminster Government's to take action on, what he described as "cash cows" for bookmakers. He has also lobbied the Scottish Government for money to support flood prevention measures in Inverclyde. From 22 June 2021 to 8 April 2026, McMillan served as the convener of the Delegated Powers and Law Reform Committee.

At McMillan's request, Inverclyde Council agreed to invite former gamblers into secondary schools to speak to pupils about the dangers of gambling. In 2014, McMillan also led a Members' Debate in the Scottish Parliament on the increasing reliance of food banks in Scotland. He was the first MSP to raise the issue in the Scottish Parliament and continues to work with and support the local foodbanks.

At present, Stuart is the Deputy Convener of the Scottish Parliament's Delegated Powers and Law Reform Committee and is also a member of the COVID-19 Committee and also Convenes the Cross-Party Groups on Tourism, Visual Impairment and Recreational Boating and Marine Tourism. Stuart is also the Scottish Parliament's Parliamentary Piper and plays the pipes at official functions for the Parliament. In 2017, Stuart toured the country and played the pipes at all 42 senior football grounds in Scotland raising money for charity.

Stuart is a lifetime honorary member of Action on Asbestos and is currently taking forward a Member's Bill to recovery the NHS the medical costs relating to industrial disease. On 3 May 2015 he was elected to the board of Moving on Inverclyde, a charity which supports recovery from problematic substance use (drugs and alcohol).

In November 2020, McMillan condemned Liberal Democrat leader Willie Rennie for claims of "anti-English rhetoric" by the SNP during the COVID-19 pandemic. McMillan, who was born in Cumbria, said: "As an English Scot I'd like to put on record my anger and disgust at the comments from Willie Rennie at the weekend. In his appalling attempt to bring naked constitutional politics into COVID-19 was ill-befitting of any party leader in this chamber. I'm sure that Willie Rennie will not have found the FM or any SNP politician spouting the rubbish that he claimed at the weekend. I quote from Mr Rennie: 'Anti-English rhetoric has reared its ugly head at different points throughout this crisis and there is no place for it.' Just as he is not responsible for the comments of his supporters, there is no party leader in this parliament that is responsible for the people who support them. Similarly, no party leader is responsible for people who are not members of their party in supporting their particular cause."
