= Brian Fitzpatrick (Scottish politician) =

Scottish lawyer and politician (born 1961)

Member of the Scottish Parliament for Strathkelvin and Bearsden
- In office 7 June 2001 – 31 March 2003
- Preceded by: Sam Galbraith
- Succeeded by: Jean Turner

Personal details
- Born: 1961 (age 64–65)
- Party: Scottish Labour Party

Brian Fitzpatrick (born 1961) is a lawyer and former Scottish Labour Party politician. He was the Member of the Scottish Parliament (MSP) for Strathkelvin and Bearsden between 2001 and 2003.

In 1999, First Minister Donald Dewar appointed him as Head of Policy in the First Minister's Policy Unit, but he resigned from this post following Dewar's death in 2000. Fitzpatrick was elected to the Scottish Parliament on 7 June 2001 in the Strathkelvin and Bearsden by-election following the resignation of Sam Galbraith for health reasons. He stood in the same seat in the 2003, but finished second, 438 votes (1.2%) behind independent hospital campaigner Jean Turner.

== Early life ==
He attended St. Robert Bellarmine Catholic school in Glasgow before studying law at Glasgow University. Between 1985 and 1992, he worked as a solicitor.

== Post-political career ==
Following his time in the Scottish Parliament he works as an advocate and personal injury lawyer.

Scottish Parliament
Preceded by Sam Galbraith	Member of the Scottish Parliament for Strathkelvin and Bearsden; 2001–2003	Succeeded by Jean Turner
