= Sam Galbraith =

British politician (1945–2014)

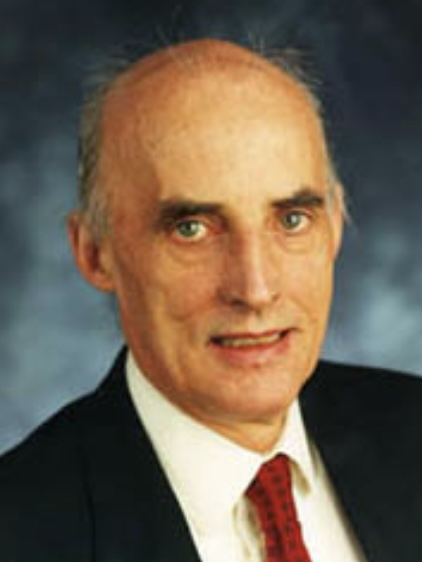

Minister for Environment, Sport and Culture
- In office 2 November 2000 – 20 March 2001
- First Minister: Henry McLeish
- Preceded by: Office established
- Succeeded by: Office abolished

Minister for Children and Education
- In office 19 May 1999 – 2 November 2000
- First Minister: Donald Dewar; Jim Wallace (acting)
- Preceded by: Office established
- Succeeded by: Jack McConnell

Member of the Scottish Parliament for Strathkelvin and Bearsden
- In office 6 May 1999 – 20 March 2001
- Preceded by: Office established
- Succeeded by: Brian Fitzpatrick

Member of Parliament for Strathkelvin and Bearsden
- In office 11 June 1987 – 14 May 2001
- Preceded by: Michael Hirst
- Succeeded by: John Lyons

Personal details
- Born: Samuel Laird Galbraith; 18 October 1945 Clitheroe, England
- Died: 18 August 2014 (aged 68) Glasgow, Scotland
- Citizenship: United Kingdom
- Party: Labour

Samuel Laird Galbraith (18 October 1945 – 18 August 2014) was a Scottish politician and neurosurgeon who served as Minister for Environment, Sport and Culture from 2000 to 2001 and Minister for Children and Education from 1999 to 2000. Galbraith was a Member of the Scottish Parliament (MSP) for Strathkelvin and Bearsden from 1999 to 2001, and a Member of Parliament (MP) in the House of Commons for the equivalent seat from 1987 to 2001.

The Labour/Liberal Democrat coalition faced demands from Scottish National Party (SNP) politicians, including future First Minister Nicola Sturgeon, for Galbraith to resign after the SQA examinations controversy in 2000. As a result of this, he was the first Minister to face a motion of no confidence in the Scottish Parliament.

== Early life ==
Galbraith was born in Clitheroe, Lancashire, to Samuel and Catherine Galbraith. He was educated at Greenock High School. He studied at Glasgow University, where he received honours in medicine. Galbraith was a respected neurosurgeon, who worked at Glasgow's Southern General Hospital.

== Political career ==
At the 1987 general election, he was returned as Member of Parliament for the Strathkelvin and Bearsden constituency, and held the seat until standing down at the 2001 general election. He was a Scottish Office Minister between 1997 and 1999.

Galbraith served as Minister for Children and Education in the Scottish Executive under Donald Dewar from 1999 to 2000 and then as Minister for Environment, Sport and Culture. Galbraith was criticised for alleged inaction during the 2000 SQA examinations controversy, where many pupils received inaccurate or incomplete grades. Following this criticism, although no longer Education Minister, the SNP lodged a motion of no confidence in Galbraith. This was the first no confidence motion voted on in the Scottish Parliament, and Galbraith survived by 52 votes in favour to 66 against with 1 abstention. On 20 March 2001 he announced his resignation from ministerial office and his parliamentary seats for health reasons.

== Personal life ==
He was married in 1987 to Nicola Tennant, and they had three daughters, Mhairi, Heather and Fiona. In prior years he was an avid mountaineer who had climbed all the Munros and also climbed in the Alps and Himalayas.

Galbraith received a lung transplant in 1990, at Freeman's Hospital Newcastle (where he continued to receive treatment), due to fibrosing alveolitis, a condition that his elder sister died from.

From 2006 he was chairman of the Scottish Maritime Museum with facilities at Irvine, North Ayrshire and Dumbarton.

He died on 18 August 2014.

Parliament of the United Kingdom
Preceded by Michael Hirst	Member of Parliament for Strathkelvin and Bearsden; 1987–2001	Succeeded by John Lyons
Scottish Parliament
New parliament Scotland Act 1998	Member of the Scottish Parliament for Strathkelvin and Bearsden; 1999–2001	Succeeded by Brian Fitzpatrick
New office	Minister for the Environment, Sport and Culture; 2000–2001	Office abolished
New office	Minister for Children and Education; 1999–2000	Succeeded by Jack McConnell
