= Pam Gosal =

Scottish Conservative politician

Pam Gosal MBE
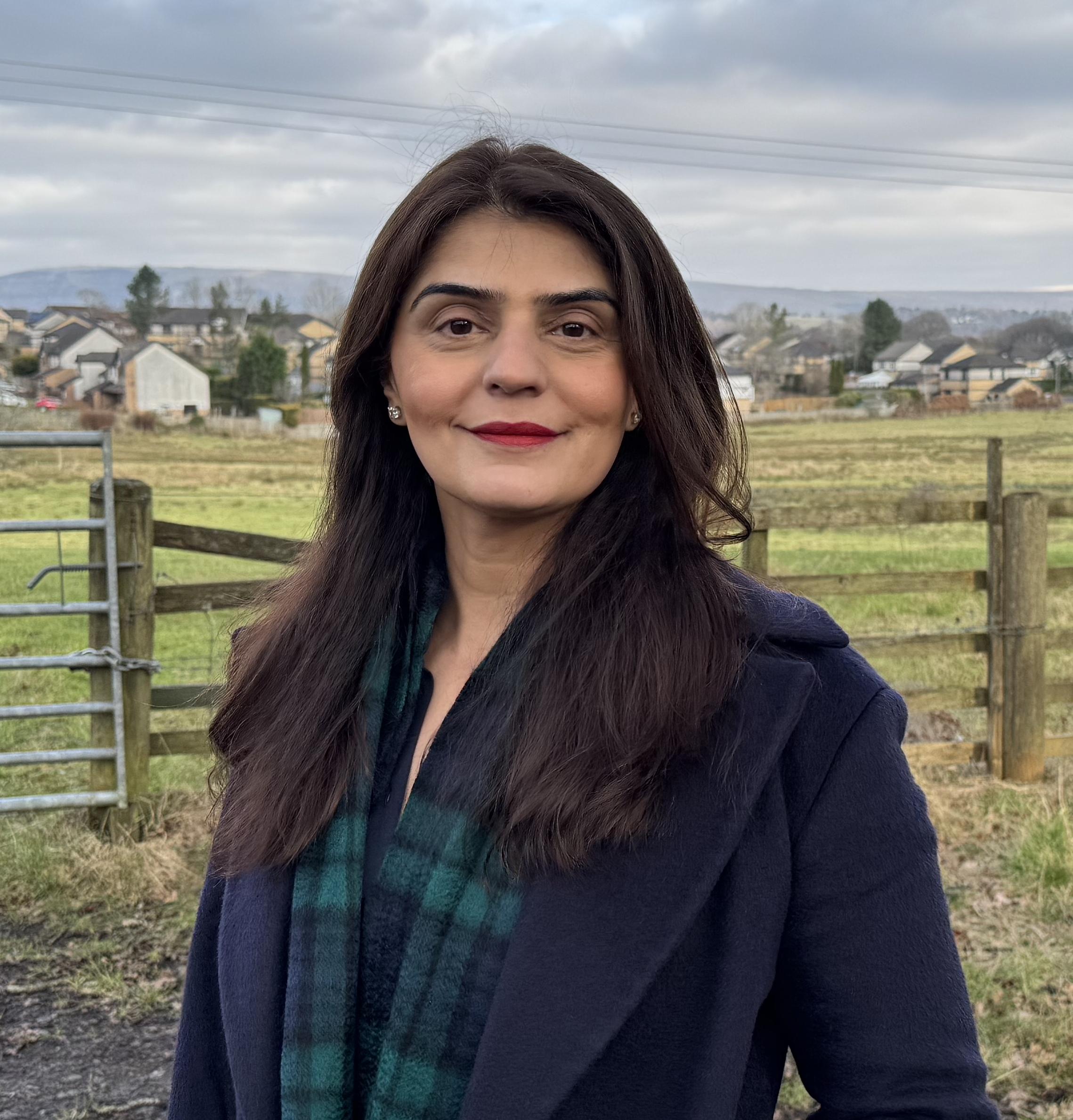
- Gosal in 2025

Member of the Scottish Parliament for West Scotland (1 of 7 Regional MSPs)
- In office 6 May 2021 – 9 April 2026

Personal details
- Born: 25 April 1972 (age 54) Glasgow, Scotland
- Party: Scottish Conservatives

Pam (Permjit) Gosal MBE (born 25 April 1972) is a Scottish Conservative politician who was a Member of the Scottish Parliament (MSP) for West Scotland from 2021 - 2026

== Background ==
Pam Gosal was born in Glasgow, Scotland. She helped run her family business before working in Local Government prior to being elected to the Scottish Parliament.

== Political career ==
Gosal stood in East Dunbartonshire at the 2019 United Kingdom general election and came in third place.

She ran in the 2021 Scottish Parliament election as the Conservative candidate for Clydebank and Milngavie and West Scotland. Gosal finished third in the Clydebank and Milngavie seat, but she was elected as a Member of the Scottish Parliament (MSP) for West Scotland. She is the first Sikh and first woman of Indian background to be elected as an MSP to the Scottish Parliament.

On 13 May 2021, Gosal and Stewart were sworn in as the first minority female MSPs. She took her oath in Punjabi as well as English. She was appointed the role of Shadow Minister for Higher Education and Further Education, Youth Employment and Training in the Scottish Conservative Shadow Cabinet.

In June 2023, she was appointed Deputy Chairwoman of the Scottish Conservatives and Deputy Shadow Cabinet Secretary for Finance and Local Government.

Gosal was appointed Member of the Order of the British Empire (MBE) in the 2024 New Year Honours for services to business, to racial equality and to charity in Milton Keynes.

In September 2024, when Russell Findlay became the new leader of the Scottish Conservatives, Gosal was re-appointed as Deputy Chairwoman of the Scottish Conservatives and was made Shadow Minister for Investment and Employment.

Gosal is also a domestic abuse campaigner. Growing up, she was witness to many victims of domestic abuse seeking refuge in safe spaces and is currently driving a Members’ Bill, the Prevention of Domestic Abuse (Scotland) Bill, through the Scottish Parliament. The Bill would introduce a number of measures, including a register for culprits similar to the sex offenders’ register.

Gosal is the founder and chair of the Scottish Conservative friends of BAME (SCBAME), the first umbrella organisation affiliated with the Scottish Conservative Party to reach out to BAME communities in Scotland.

Gosal also successfully set up the first ever Cross-Party Parliamentary Group on India in 2021 and is Convener of the group, which aims to improve relationships in the areas of education, trade and culture between India and Scotland. In March 2025, the Cross-Party Group on facilitated the signing of a Memorandum of Understanding between Scottish Federation of Enterprise and Federation of Indian Chambers of Commerce & Industry (FICCI) in the Scottish Parliament.

== See also ==
- List of British Indians
- List of British Sikhs
- List of ethnic minority politicians in the United Kingdom
