= List of Scottish Parliament constituencies and electoral regions (1999–2011) =

The Scottish Parliament (Holyrood) has 73 constituencies, each electing one Member of the Scottish Parliament (MSP) by the plurality (first past the post) system of election, and eight additional members regions, each electing seven additional MSPs.

Each region is a group of constituencies, and the D'Hondt method of allocating additional member seats from party lists is used to produce a form of proportional representation for each region

The total number of parliamentary seats is 129. For links to lists of MSPs, see Member of the Scottish Parliament.

The constituencies and regions were first used in 1999, for the first election of the Scottish Parliament, and were used also for the 2003 and 2007 elections.

The First Periodic Review of Scottish Parliament Boundaries by the Boundary Commission for Scotland was started in 2007, and the Commission reported to the Secretary of State for Scotland on 26 May 2010. The Commission's recommendations were implemented ahead of the 2011 Scottish Parliament election, to form the Scottish Parliament constituencies and regions from 2011.

== Boundaries ==
The Scottish Parliament constituencies from 1999 were created with the boundaries of the constituencies of the House of Commons of the Parliament of the United Kingdom (Westminster) as they were in 1999, apart from Orkney Islands and Shetland Islands, which are separate constituencies, unlike the single Orkney and Shetland Westminster constituency.

Under the Scotland Act 1998, changes to Westminster boundaries were also to be changes to Holyrood boundaries. This link between the two sets of constituencies was broken, however, by the Scottish Parliament (Constituencies) Act 2004, before the results of the fifth periodical review of Westminster constituencies were implemented for the 2005 United Kingdom general election. The fifth Westminster review reduced the number of Westminster constituencies and, therefore, the number of Scottish Members of Parliament, from 72 to 59.

The boundaries of Westminster constituencies, as they existed until 2005, had not been subject to review since the removal of local government regions and districts. Many Holyrood constituencies, retaining those boundaries as they did, thus straddled boundaries between the council areas created in 1996. Various council areas were divided between two Holyrood electoral regions, and one council area, the South Lanarkshire council area, was divided between three different electoral regions.

The Arbuthnott Commission, in its final report, January 2006, recommended that council area boundaries and Holyrood and Westminster constituency boundaries should all be reviewed together. This recommendation was not implemented, and the Scottish Parliament constituencies and electoral regions were instead altered following the first periodic review of Scottish Parliament boundaries, the results of which were implemented ahead of the 2011 Scottish Parliament election.

=== Constituencies (first past the post seats) ===
Constituency	Council area or areas	Additional members region
A
Aberdeen Central	Part of Aberdeen City	North East Scotland
Aberdeen North	Part of Aberdeen City	North East Scotland
Aberdeen South	Part of Aberdeen City	North East Scotland
Airdrie and Shotts	Part of North Lanarkshire	Central Scotland
Angus	Part of Angus, part of Dundee City, and part of Perth and Kinross	North East Scotland
Argyll and Bute	Part of Argyll and Bute	Highlands and Islands
Ayr	Part of South Ayrshire	South of Scotland
B
Banff and Buchan	Part of Aberdeenshire	North East Scotland
C
Caithness, Sutherland and Easter Ross	Part of Highland	Highlands and Islands
Carrick, Cumnock and Doon Valley	Part of East Ayrshire, and part of South Ayrshire	South of Scotland
Central Fife	Part of Fife	Mid Scotland and Fife
Clydesdale	Part of South Lanarkshire	South of Scotland
Clydebank and Milngavie	Part of East Dunbartonshire, and part of West Dunbartonshire	West of Scotland
Coatbridge and Chryston	Part of East Dunbartonshire, and part of North Lanarkshire	Central Scotland
Cumbernauld and Kilsyth	Part of North Lanarkshire	Central Scotland
Cunninghame North	Part of North Ayrshire	West of Scotland
Cunninghame South	Part of North Ayrshire	South of Scotland
D
Dumbarton	Part of Argyll and Bute, and part of West Dunbartonshire	West of Scotland
Dumfries	Part of Dumfries and Galloway	South of Scotland
Dundee East	Part of Dundee City	North East Scotland
Dundee West	Part of Dundee City	North East Scotland
Dunfermline East	Part of Fife	Mid Scotland and Fife
Dunfermline West	Part of Fife	Mid Scotland and Fife
E
East Kilbride	Part of South Lanarkshire	Central Scotland
East Lothian	Part of East Lothian	South of Scotland
Eastwood	East Renfrewshire	West of Scotland
Edinburgh Central	Part of City of Edinburgh	Lothians
Edinburgh East and Musselburgh	Part of East Lothian, and part of City of Edinburgh	Lothians
Edinburgh North and Leith	Part of City of Edinburgh	Lothians
Edinburgh Pentlands	Part of City of Edinburgh	Lothians
Edinburgh South	Part of City of Edinburgh	Lothians
Edinburgh West	Part of City of Edinburgh	Lothians
F
Falkirk East	Part of Falkirk	Central Scotland
Falkirk West	Part of Falkirk	Central Scotland
G
Galloway and Upper Nithsdale	Part of Dumfries and Galloway	South of Scotland
Glasgow Anniesland	Part of Glasgow City	Glasgow
Glasgow Baillieston	Part of Glasgow City	Glasgow
Glasgow Cathcart	Part of Glasgow City	Glasgow
Glasgow Govan	Part of Glasgow City	Glasgow
Glasgow Kelvin	Part of Glasgow City	Glasgow
Glasgow Maryhill	Part of Glasgow City	Glasgow
Glasgow Pollok	Part of Glasgow City	Glasgow
Glasgow Rutherglen	Part of Glasgow City, and part of South Lanarkshire	Glasgow
Glasgow Shettleston	Part of Glasgow City	Glasgow
Glasgow Springburn	Part of Glasgow City	Glasgow
Gordon	Part of Aberdeenshire, and part of Moray	North East Scotland
Greenock and Inverclyde	Part of Inverclyde	West of Scotland
H
Hamilton North and Bellshill	Part of North Lanarkshire, and part of South Lanarkshire	Central Scotland
Hamilton South	Part of South Lanarkshire	Central Scotland
I
Inverness East, Nairn and Lochaber	Part of Highland	Highlands and Islands
K
Kilmarnock and Loudoun	Part of East Ayrshire	Central Scotland
Kirkcaldy	Part of Fife	Mid Scotland and Fife
L
Linlithgow	Part of West Lothian	Lothians
Livingston	Part of West Lothian	Lothians
M
Midlothian	Part of Midlothian	Lothians
Moray	Part of Moray	Highlands and Islands
Motherwell and Wishaw	Part of North Lanarkshire	Central Scotland
N
North East Fife	Part of Fife	Mid Scotland and Fife
North Tayside	Part of Angus, and part of Perth and Kinross	Mid Scotland and Fife
O
Ochil	Clackmannanshire, part of Perth and Kinross, and part of Stirling	Mid Scotland and Fife
Orkney Islands	Orkney Islands	Highlands and Islands
P
Paisley North	Part of Renfrewshire	West of Scotland
Paisley South	Part of Renfrewshire	West of Scotland
Perth	Part of Perth and Kinross	Mid Scotland and Fife
R
Ross, Skye and Inverness West	Part of Highland	Highlands and Islands
Roxburgh and Berwickshire	Part of Scottish Borders	South of Scotland
S
Shetland Islands	Shetland Islands	Highlands and Islands
Stirling	Part of Stirling	Mid Scotland and Fife
Strathkelvin and Bearsden	Part of East Dunbartonshire	West of Scotland
T
Tweeddale, Ettrick and Lauderdale	Part of Midlothian, and part of Scottish Borders	South of Scotland
W
West Aberdeenshire and Kincardine	Part of Aberdeenshire	North East Scotland
Western Isles	Na h-Eileanan Siar	Highlands and Islands
West Renfrewshire	Part of Inverclyde, and part of Renfrewshire	West of Scotland

=== Additional member regions ===
Region	Constituencies	map
Central Scotland	Airdrie and Shotts; Coatbridge and Chryston; Cumbernauld and Kilsyth; East Kilbride; Falkirk East; Falkirk West; Hamilton North and Bellshill; Hamilton South; Kilmarnock and Loudoun; Motherwell and Wishaw	
Glasgow	Glasgow Anniesland; Glasgow Baillieston; Glasgow Cathcart; Glasgow Govan; Glasgow Kelvin; Glasgow Maryhill; Glasgow Pollok; Glasgow Rutherglen; Glasgow Shettleston; Glasgow Springburn	
Highlands and Islands	Argyll and Bute; Caithness, Sutherland and Easter Ross; Inverness East, Nairn and Lochaber; Moray; Orkney Islands; Ross, Skye and Inverness West; Shetland Islands; Western Isles	
Lothians	Edinburgh Central; Edinburgh East and Musselburgh; Edinburgh North and Leith; Edinburgh Pentlands; Edinburgh South; Edinburgh West; Linlithgow; Livingston; Midlothian	
Mid Scotland and Fife	Central Fife; Dunfermline East; Dunfermline West; Kirkcaldy; North East Fife; North Tayside; Ochil; Perth; Stirling	
North East Scotland	Aberdeen Central; Aberdeen North; Aberdeen South; Angus; Banff and Buchan; Dundee East; Dundee West; Gordon; West Aberdeenshire and Kincardine	
South of Scotland	Ayr; Carrick, Cumnock and Doon Valley; Clydesdale; Cunninghame South; Dumfries; East Lothian; Galloway and Upper Nithsdale; Roxburgh and Berwickshire; Tweeddale, Ettrick and Lauderdale	
West of Scotland	Clydebank and Milngavie; Cunninghame North; Dumbarton; Eastwood; Greenock and Inverclyde; Paisley North; Paisley South; Strathkelvin and Bearsden; West Renfrewshire	
