= West of Scotland (Scottish Parliament electoral region) =

Scottish Parliament electoral region

- Former electoral region for the Scottish Parliament
- West of Scotland shown within Scotland

Former electoral region
- Created: 1999
- Abolished: 2011
- Council areas: Argyll and Bute (part); East Dunbartonshire (part); East Renfrewshire; Inverclyde; North Ayrshire (part); Renfrewshire (part); West Dunbartonshire
- Constituencies: Clydebank and Milngavie; Cunninghame North; Dumbarton; Eastwood; Greenock and Inverclyde; Paisley North; Paisley South; Strathkelvin and Bearsden; West Renfrewshire

West of Scotland was one of the eight electoral regions of the Scottish Parliament that were created in 1999. Nine of the Parliament's 73 first past the post constituencies were sub-divisions of the region and it elected seven of the 56 additional-member Members of the Scottish Parliament (MSPs). Thus it elected a total of 16 MSPs.

The West of Scotland region shared boundaries with the Central Scotland, Glasgow, Highlands and Islands, and Mid Scotland and Fife regions.

Following the First Periodic Review of Scottish Parliament Boundaries it was eventually replaced by the West Scotland region.

== Constituencies and local government areas ==
In terms of first past the post constituencies the region covered:

Map	Constituency
	1. Clydebank and Milngavie covers the eastern portion of the West Dunbartonshire council area and a western portion of the East Dunbartonshire council area.; 2. Cunninghame North covers a north-western portion of the North Ayrshire council area.; 3. Dumbarton covers a western portion of the West Dunbartonshire council area and a south-eastern portion of the Argyll and Bute council area.; 4. Eastwood covers the East Renfrewshire council area.; 5. Greenock and Inverclyde covers a western portion of the Inverclyde council area.; 6. Paisley North covers an eastern portion of the Renfrewshire council area.; 7. Paisley South covers a south eastern portion of the Renfrewshire council area.; 8. Strathkelvin and Bearsden covers the majority of the East Dunbartonshire council area.; 9. West Renfrewshire covers a western portion of the Renfrewshire council area and an eastern portion of the Inverclyde council area.

The constituencies were created in 1999 with the names and boundaries of Westminster constituencies, as existing at that time. Scottish Westminster constituencies were mostly replaced with new constituencies in 2005.

In terms of local government areas the region covered:

- West Dunbartonshire
- East Renfrewshire
- Inverclyde
- Most of Renfrewshire (otherwise within the Glasgow region)
- Most of East Dunbartonshire (otherwise within the Central Scotland region)
- Part of Argyll and Bute (otherwise within the Highlands and Islands region)
- Part of North Ayrshire (otherwise within the South of Scotland region)

=== Boundary changes ===
The Boundary Commission recommended changes to the electoral regions used to elect "list" members of the Scottish Parliament. The "West Scotland" region consisted of the constituencies of Clydebank and Milngavie; Cunninghame North; Cunninghame South; Dumbarton; Eastwood; Greenock and Inverclyde; Paisley; Renfrewshire North and West; Renfrewshire South; and Starthkelvin and Bearsden. These were newly formed constituencies.

== Members of the Scottish Parliament ==
=== Constituency MSPs ===
Term	Election	Strathkelvin and Bearsden	Clydebank and Milngavie	Dumbarton	Eastwood	Paisley South	Paisley North	West Renfrewshire	Greenock and Iverclyde	Cunninghame North
1st	1999	Sam Galbraith (Labour)	Des McNulty (Labour)	Jackie Baillie (Labour)	Kenneth Macintosh (Labour)	Hugh Henry (Labour)	Wendy Alexander (Labour)	Trish Godman (Labour)	Duncan McNeil (Labour)	Allan Wilson (Labour)
1st	1999	Brian Fitzpatrick (Labour)	Des McNulty (Labour)	Jackie Baillie (Labour)	Kenneth Macintosh (Labour)	Hugh Henry (Labour)	Wendy Alexander (Labour)	Trish Godman (Labour)	Duncan McNeil (Labour)	Allan Wilson (Labour)
2nd	2003	Jean Turner; Independent	Des McNulty (Labour)	Jackie Baillie (Labour)	Kenneth Macintosh (Labour)	Hugh Henry (Labour)	Wendy Alexander (Labour)	Trish Godman (Labour)	Duncan McNeil (Labour)	Allan Wilson (Labour)
3rd	2007	David Whitton (Labour)	Des McNulty (Labour)	Jackie Baillie (Labour)	Kenneth Macintosh (Labour)	Hugh Henry (Labour)	Wendy Alexander (Labour)	Trish Godman (Labour)	Duncan McNeil (Labour)	Kenneth Gibson (SNP)

=== Regional List MSPs ===
N.B. This table is for presentation purposes only

Parliament	MSP	MSP	MSP	MSP	MSP	MSP	MSP
1st (1999–2003)	Colin Campbell (SNP)	Kay Ullrich (SNP)	Lloyd Quinan (SNP)	Fiona McLeod (SNP)	Ross Finnie (Lib Dem)	Annabel Goldie (Conservative)	John Young (Conservative)
2nd (2003–07)	Stewart Maxwell (SNP)	Campbell Martin (SNP)	Bruce McFee (SNP)	Frances Curran (Socialist)	Ross Finnie (Lib Dem)	Annabel Goldie (Conservative)	Murray Tosh (Conservative)
3rd (2007–11)	Stewart Maxwell (SNP)	Stuart McMillan (SNP)	Bill Wilson (SNP)	Gil Paterson (SNP)	Ross Finnie (Lib Dem)	Annabel Goldie (Conservative)	Jackson Carlaw (Conservative)

== Election results ==
=== 2007 Scottish Parliament election ===
In the 2007 Scottish Parliament election the region elected MSPs as follows:

- 8 Labour MSPs (all constituency members)
- 5 Scottish National Party MSPs (one constituency member, 4 additional members)
- 2 Conservative MSPs (both additional members)
- 1 Liberal Democrat MSP (additional member)

==== Constituency results ====
2007 Scottish Parliament election: West of Scotland
Constituency	Elected member	Result
Clydebank and Milngavie	Des McNulty	Labour hold
Cunninghame North	Kenneth Gibson	SNP gain from Labour
Dumbarton	Jackie Baillie	Labour hold
Eastwood	Kenneth Macintosh	Labour hold
Greenock and Inverclyde	Duncan McNeil	Labour hold
Paisley North	Wendy Alexander	Labour hold
Paisley South	Hugh Henry	Labour hold
Strathkelvin and Bearsden	David Whitton	Labour gain from Independent
West Renfrewshire	Patricia Godman	Labour hold

==== Additional member results ====
2007 Scottish Parliament election: West of Scotland
Party	Elected candidates	Seats	+/−	Votes	%	+/−%
Labour		0	0	91,725	34.2	-1.6
SNP	Stewart Maxwell; Gil Paterson; Bill Wilson; Stuart McMillan	4	+1	75,953	28.3	+8.7
Conservative	Annabel Goldie; Jackson Carlaw	2	±0	40,637	15.2	-0.5
Liberal Democrats	Ross Finnie	1	±0	22,515	8.4	-3.9
Green		0	0	8,152	3.0	-2.6
Scottish Senior Citizens		0	0	5,231	2.0	-0.8
Solidarity		0	0	4,774	1.8	N/A
Scottish Christian		0	0	3,729	1.4	N/A
BNP		0	0	3,241	1.2	N/A
CPA		0	0	3,027	1.1	N/A
Save NHS Group		0	0	2,682	1.0	N/A
Scottish Socialist		0	-1	1,716	0.6	-6.6
Socialist Labour		0	0	1,557	0.6	-0.6
Scottish Unionist		0	0	1,245	0.5	-0.2
UKIP		0	0	888	0.3	-0.3
Scottish Voice		0	0	522	0.2	N/A
Scottish Jacobite Party		0	0	446	0.2	N/A
Socialist Equality		0	0	139	0.0	N/A

=== 2003 Scottish Parliament election ===
In the 2003 Scottish Parliament election the region elected MSPs as follows:

- 8 Labour MSPs (all constituency members)
- 3 Scottish National Party MSPs (all additional members)
- 2 Conservative MSPs (both additional members)
- 1 Independent MSP (constituency member)
- 1 Liberal Democrat MSPs (additional member)
- 1 Scottish Socialist Party MSP (additional member)

==== Constituency results ====
2003 Scottish Parliament election: West of Scotland
Constituency	Elected member	Result
Clydebank and Milngavie	Des McNulty	Labour
Cunninghame North	Allan Wilson	Labour
Dumbarton	Jackie Baillie	Labour
Eastwood	Kenneth Macintosh	Labour
Greenock and Inverclyde	Duncan McNeil	Labour
Paisley North	Wendy Alexander	Labour
Paisley South	Hugh Henry	Labour
Strathkelvin and Bearsden	Jean Turner	Independent
West Renfrewshire	Patricia Godman	Labour

==== Additional member results ====
2003 Scottish Parliament election: West of Scotland
Party	Elected candidates	Seats	+/−	Votes	%	+/−%
Labour		0	0	83,931	32.6	-5.9
SNP	Campbell Martin; Bruce McFee; Stewart Maxwell	3	−1	50,387	19.6	-6.3
Conservative	Annabel Goldie; Murray Tosh	2	±0	40,261	15.7	–
Liberal Democrats	Ross Finnie	1	±0	31,580	12.3	+1.3
Scottish Socialist	Frances Curran	1	+1	18,591	7.2	+5.3
Green		0	0	14,544	5.7	+3.1
Scottish Senior Citizens		0	0	7,100	2.8	N/A
ProLife Party		0	0	3,674	1.40	N/A
Socialist Labour		0	0	3,155	1.2	-0.2
UKIP		0	0	1,662	0.6	N/A
Scottish Unionist		0	0	1,617	0.6	–
Scottish People's		0	0	674	0.3	N/A

=== 1999 Scottish Parliament election ===
In the 1999 Scottish Parliament election the region elected MSPs as follows:

- 9 Labour MSPs (all constituency members)
- 4 Scottish National Party MSPs (all additional members)
- 2 Conservative MSPs (both additional members)
- 1 Liberal Democrat MSP (additional member)

==== Constituency results ====
1999 Scottish Parliament election: West of Scotland
Constituency	Elected member	Result
Clydebank and Milngavie	Des McNulty	Scottish Labour Party win (new seat)
Cunninghame North	Allan Wilson	Scottish Labour Party win (new seat)
Dumbarton	Jackie Baillie	Scottish Labour Party win (new seat)
Eastwood	Kenneth Macintosh	Scottish Labour Party win (new seat)
Greenock and Inverclyde	Duncan McNeil	Scottish Labour Party win (new seat)
Paisley North	Wendy Alexander	Scottish Labour Party win (new seat)
Paisley South	Hugh Henry	Scottish Labour Party win (new seat)
Strathkelvin and Bearsden	Sam Galbraith	Scottish Labour Party win (new seat)
West Renfrewshire	Patricia Godman	Scottish Labour Party win (new seat)

Changes:

- On 20 March 2001 Sam Galbraith resigned, citing health reasons. At the subsequent Strathkelvin and Bearsden by-election held 7 June 2001, Brian Fitzpatrick held the seat for Labour.

==== Additional member results ====
1999 Scottish Parliament election: West of Scotland
Party	Elected candidates	Seats	+/−	Votes	%	+/−%
Labour		0	N/A	119,663	38.5	N/A
SNP	Colin Campbell; Kay Ullrich; Lloyd Quinan; Fiona McLeod	4	N/A	80,417	25.9	N/A
Conservative	Annabel Goldie; John Young	2	N/A	48,666	15.7	N/A
Liberal Democrats	Ross Finnie	1	N/A	34,095	11.0	N/A
Green		0	N/A	8,174	2.6	N/A
Scottish Socialist		0	N/A	5,944	1.9	N/A
Socialist Labour		0	N/A	4,472	1.4	N/A
ProLife Alliance		0	N/A	3,227	1.0	N/A
Independent		0	N/A	2,761	0.9	N/A
Scottish Unionist		0	N/A	1,840	0.6	N/A
Natural Law Party		0	N/A	589	0.2	N/A
Independent		0	N/A	565	0.2	N/A
