= List of Scottish Parliament constituencies and electoral regions (2011–2026) =

As a result of the first periodical review of Scottish Parliament constituencies undertaken by the Local Government Boundary Commission for Scotland (Note: This body has since been renamed Boundaries Scotland), new constituencies and additional member regions of the Scottish Parliament were introduced for the 2011 Scottish Parliament election. The D'Hondt method is used, as previously, in the allocation of additional member seats. These boundaries were also used for the 2016 Scottish Parliament election and 2021 Scottish Parliament election; following the Second periodic review of Scottish Parliament boundaries, which concluded in 2025, new boundaries will be used for the 2026 Scottish Parliament election.

== Boundary review ==
The Scottish Parliament (Constituencies) Act 2004 required the Boundary Commission for Scotland to review boundaries of all constituencies except Orkney Islands and Shetland Islands (which cover, respectively, the Orkney Islands council area and the Shetland Islands council area) so that the area covered by the reviewed constituencies continues to be covered by a total of 71 constituencies. The Orkney and Shetland constituencies were taken into account, however, in review of boundaries of the additional member regions. The Commission began the review as announced on 3 July 2007, and provisional proposals were published on Thursday 14 February 2008. Final recommendations followed public consultations and a series of local inquiries, and the terms of the 2004 act required final recommendations to be submitted in a report to the Secretary of State for Scotland not later than 30 June 2010.

For the purposes of boundary reviews the commission must take into account the boundaries of the local government council areas. In order to do this some council areas were grouped together, the largest of these groupings of provisional proposals consisted of four of Scotland's 32 council areas the smallest only containing one. Constituencies created in 1999 were based on Scottish Westminster constituencies that were created in 1997 and they in turn were based on the boundaries of local government regions and districts and islands areas that existed at the time, but since have been abolished and replaced with the council areas.

A second periodic review of Scottish Parliament boundaries was begun by Boundaries Scotland in 2022, establishing new constituency and electoral region boundaries that will be first contested at the 2026 Scottish Parliament election.

=== Constituencies ===
Constituency	Council area or areas	Additional members region	Population (2019)
Aberdeen Central	Aberdeen City	North East Scotland	83,675
Aberdeen Donside	Aberdeen City	North East Scotland	80,156
Aberdeen South and North Kincardine	Aberdeen City, Aberdeenshire	North East Scotland	79,644
Aberdeenshire East	Aberdeenshire	North East Scotland	80,855
Aberdeenshire West	Aberdeenshire	North East Scotland	76,516
Airdrie and Shotts	North Lanarkshire	Central Scotland	70,478
Almond Valley	West Lothian	Lothian	86,477
Angus North and Mearns	Aberdeenshire, Angus	North East Scotland	70,839
Angus South	Angus	North East Scotland	72,926
Argyll and Bute	Argyll and Bute	Highlands and Islands	60,394
Ayr	South Ayrshire	South Scotland	75,598
Banffshire and Buchan Coast	Aberdeenshire, Moray	North East Scotland	75,612
Caithness, Sutherland and Ross	Highland	Highlands and Islands	69,767
Carrick, Cumnock and Doon Valley	East Ayrshire, South Ayrshire	South Scotland	75,928
Clackmannanshire and Dunblane	Clackmannanshire, Stirling	Mid Scotland and Fife	68,728
Clydebank and Milngavie	East Dunbartonshire, West Dunbartonshire	West Scotland	70,398
Clydesdale	South Lanarkshire	South Scotland	72,548
Coatbridge and Chryston	North Lanarkshire	Central Scotland	72,162
Cowdenbeath	Fife	Mid Scotland and Fife	71,913
Cumbernauld and Kilsyth	North Lanarkshire	Central Scotland	64,322
Cunninghame North	North Ayrshire	West Scotland	69,233
Cunninghame South	North Ayrshire	West Scotland	66,047
Dumbarton	Argyll and Bute, West Dunbartonshire	West Scotland	72,921
Dumfriesshire	Dumfries and Galloway	South Scotland	75,849
Dundee City East	Dundee City	North East Scotland	70,971
Dundee City West	Dundee City	North East Scotland	77,779
Dunfermline	Fife	Mid Scotland and Fife	77,005
East Kilbride	South Lanarkshire	Central Scotland	77,300
East Lothian	East Lothian	South Scotland	79,505
Eastwood	East Renfrewshire	West Scotland	71,066
Edinburgh Central	City of Edinburgh	Lothian	94,040
Edinburgh Eastern	City of Edinburgh	Lothian	86,488
Edinburgh Northern and Leith	City of Edinburgh	Lothian	93,605
Edinburgh Pentlands	City of Edinburgh	Lothian	77,633
Edinburgh Southern	City of Edinburgh	Lothian	81,639
Edinburgh Western	City of Edinburgh	Lothian	85,095
Ettrick, Roxburgh and Berwickshire	Scottish Borders	South Scotland	68,019
Falkirk East	Falkirk	Central Scotland	80,482
Falkirk West	Falkirk	Central Scotland	79,858
Galloway and West Dumfries	Dumfries and Galloway	South Scotland	72,941
Glasgow Anniesland	Glasgow City	Glasgow	75,114
Glasgow Cathcart	Glasgow City	Glasgow	74,809
Glasgow Kelvin	Glasgow City	Glasgow	93,212
Glasgow Maryhill and Springburn	Glasgow City	Glasgow	74,527
Glasgow Pollok	Glasgow City	Glasgow	81,004
Glasgow Provan	Glasgow City	Glasgow	76,859
Glasgow Shettleston	Glasgow City	Glasgow	79,969
Glasgow Southside	Glasgow City	Glasgow	70,916
Greenock and Inverclyde	Inverclyde	West Scotland	72,866
Hamilton, Larkhall and Stonehouse	South Lanarkshire	Central Scotland	74,077
Inverness and Nairn	Highland	Highlands and Islands	89,755
Kilmarnock and Irvine Valley	East Ayrshire	South Scotland	82,864
Kirkcaldy	Fife	Mid Scotland and Fife	78,351
Linlithgow	West Lothian	Lothian	95,663
Mid Fife and Glenrothes	Fife	Mid Scotland and Fife	69,415
Midlothian North and Musselburgh	East Lothian, Midlothian	Lothian	85,799
Midlothian South, Tweeddale and Lauderdale	Midlothian, Scottish Borders	South Scotland	79,077
Moray	Moray	Highlands and Islands	80,367
Motherwell and Wishaw	North Lanarkshire	Central Scotland	76,394
Na h-Eileanan an Iar	Na h-Eileanan Siar	Highlands and Islands	26,830
North East Fife	Fife	Mid Scotland and Fife	75,226
Orkney Islands	Orkney Islands	Highlands and Islands	22,190
Paisley	Renfrewshire	West Scotland	72,752
Perthshire North	Perth and Kinross	Mid Scotland and Fife	72,577
Perthshire South and Kinross-shire	Perth and Kinross	Mid Scotland and Fife	78,713
Renfrewshire North and West	Inverclyde, Renfrewshire	West Scotland	66,270
Renfrewshire South	East Renfrewshire, Renfrewshire	West Scotland	68,156
Rutherglen	South Lanarkshire	Glasgow	77,568
Shetland Islands	Shetland Islands	Highlands and Islands	22,990
Skye, Lochaber and Badenoch	Highland	Highlands and Islands	76,018
Stirling	Stirling	Mid Scotland and Fife	77,002
Strathkelvin and Bearsden	East Dunbartonshire	West Scotland	80,007
Uddingston and Bellshill	North Lanarkshire, South Lanarkshire	Central Scotland	74,351

=== Electoral regions ===
The Boundary Commission also recommended changes to the electoral regions used to elect "list" members of the Scottish Parliament. The recommendations can be summarised below;

Region	Constituencies	map
Central Scotland (2019 population: 669,424)	Airdrie and Shotts; Coatbridge and Chryston; Cumbernauld and Kilsyth; East Kilbride; Falkirk East; Falkirk West; Hamilton, Larkhall and Stonehouse; Motherwell and Wishaw; Uddingston and Bellshill	
Glasgow (2019 population: 703,978)	Glasgow Anniesland; Glasgow Cathcart; Glasgow Kelvin; Glasgow Maryhill and Springburn; Glasgow Pollok; Glasgow Provan; Glasgow Shettleston; Glasgow Southside; Rutherglen	
Highlands and Islands (2019 population: 448,311)	Argyll and Bute; Caithness, Sutherland and Ross; Inverness and Nairn; Moray; Na h-Eileanan an Iar; Orkney Islands; Shetland Islands; Skye, Lochaber and Badenoch	
Lothian (2019 population: 786,439)	Almond Valley; Edinburgh Central; Edinburgh Eastern; Edinburgh Northern and Leith; Edinburgh Pentlands; Edinburgh Southern; Edinburgh Western; Linlithgow; Midlothian North and Musselburgh	
Mid Scotland and Fife (2019 population: 668,930)	Clackmannanshire and Dunblane; Cowdenbeath; Dunfermline; Kirkcaldy; Mid Fife and Glenrothes; North East Fife; Perthshire North; Perthshire South and Kinross-shire; Stirling	
North East Scotland (2019 population: 768,973)	Aberdeen Central; Aberdeen Donside; Aberdeen South and North Kincardine; Aberdeenshire East; Aberdeenshire West; Angus North and Mearns; Angus South; Banffshire and Buchan Coast; Dundee City East; Dundee City West	
South Scotland (2019 population: 682,329)	Ayr; Carrick, Cumnock and Doon Valley; Clydesdale; Dumfriesshire; East Lothian; Ettrick, Roxburgh and Berwickshire; Galloway and West Dumfries; Kilmarnock and Irvine Valley; Midlothian South, Tweeddale and Lauderdale	
West Scotland (2019 population: 709,716)	Clydebank and Milngavie; Cunninghame North; Cunninghame South; Dumbarton; Eastwood; Greenock and Inverclyde; Paisley; Renfrewshire North and West; Renfrewshire South; Strathkelvin and Bearsden	
