= Lists of regions of Scotland =

Lists of regions of Scotland: In the political geography of Scotland, there are various ways in which Scotland has historically been subdivided into regions and districts for various governmental purposes over time.

- Local government areas of Scotland (1975–1996)—former system of regions and districts.
- Subdivisions of Scotland—unitary authority areas, in use from 1996 to present.
- Scottish Parliament constituencies and electoral regions—in use from 1999 to present.
  - List of Scottish Parliament constituencies and electoral regions (1999–2011)
  - List of Scottish Parliament constituencies and electoral regions (2011–present)
