= Renfrewshire South =

Region or constituency of the Scottish Parliament

- Former county constituency for the Scottish Parliament

- Renfrewshire South shown within the West Scotland electoral region and the region shown within Scotland
- Population: 68,156 (2019)

Former constituency
- Created: 2011
- Abolished: 2026
- Council area: Renfrewshire; East Renfrewshire
- Replaced by: Renfrewshire West and Levern Valley

Renfrewshire South was a constituency of the Scottish Parliament covering parts of the council areas of Renfrewshire and East Renfrewshire. Under the additional-member system used for elections to the Scottish Parliament, the seat elected one Member of the Scottish Parliament (MSP) by the plurality (first past the post) method of election, and was also one of ten constituencies in the West Scotland electoral region, which elected seven additional members, in addition to the nine constituency MSPs, to produce a form of proportional representation for the region as a whole.

The constituency was created for the 2011 Scottish Parliament election from parts of the former constituencies of West Renfrewshire, Paisley South and Paisley North constituencies. It also contained some areas of East Renfrewshire that were originally part of the Eastwood constituency.

It was abolished for of the 2026 Scottish Parliament election and replaced by the new Renfrewshire West and Levern Valley constituency.

Labour Party politician Hugh Henry won the seat upon its creation for 2011 Scottish Parliament election, having held its predecessor constituency of Paisley South since 1999. Henry retired from politics prior to the 2016 election, which saw Tom Arthur gain the seat for the Scottish National Party. Arthur was subsequently re-elected in the 2021 Scottish Parliament election and held the seat until its abolition in 2026.

== Electoral region ==
During the period Renfrewshire South was in existence, the other nine constituencies of the West Scotland region were: Clydebank and Milngavie, Cunninghame North, Cunninghame South, Dumbarton, Eastwood, Greenock and Inverclyde, Paisley, Renfrewshire North and West and Strathkelvin and Bearsden. During this period, the region covered all of the East Dunbartonshire, the East Renfrewshire, the Inverclyde, North Ayrshire, Renfrewshire, and West Dunbartonshire council areas, and part of the Argyll and Bute council area.

== Constituency boundaries and council area ==
Map of boundaries from 2011

Renfrewshire South contained portions of both Renfrewshire and East Renfrewshire, and was formed from the following electoral wards:

- East Renfrewshire Council wards
  - Barrhead, Liboside and Uplawmoor (entire ward)
  - Newton Mearns North and Neilston (shared with Eastwood constituency)
- Renfrewshire Council wards:
  - Johnstone North, Kilbarchan, Howwood and Lochwinnoch (entire ward)
  - Johnstone South and Elderslie (shared with Paisley constituency)
  - Houston, Crosslee and Linwood (shared with Renfrewshire North and West constituency)

During this period the rest of Renfrewshire was covered by the Paisley and Renfrewshire North and West seats, whilst the rest of East Renfrewshire formed the Eastwood seat.

== Constituency profile ==
Located in the West-Central Lowlands of Scotland, the constituency lay to the south of the town of Paisley and covered portions of the Renfrewshire and East Renfrewshire council areas. It included a number of small towns and villages that developed during the Industrial Revolution, when the chief industry was thread and cotton manufacture in factories powered by the Black Cart Water and small scale coal mining.

The main population centres were the former burghs of Johnstone and Barrhead. The seat also covered the villages of Elderslie, Howwood, Kilbarchan, Lochwinnoch, Neilston and Uplawmoor alongside numerous hamlets.

== Member of the Scottish Parliament ==
Election	Member	Party
2011	Hugh Henry	Labour
2016	Tom Arthur	SNP

== Election results ==
=== 2020s ===
2021 Scottish Parliament election: Renfrewshire South
Party	Candidate	Constituency			Regional		
Party	Candidate	Votes	%	±%	Votes	%	±%
SNP	Tom Arthur (Note: Incumbent member for this constituency)	17,532	50.5	▲2.4	15,127	43.3	▼0.7
Labour Co-op	Paul O'Kane (Note: Elected on the party list)	10,426	30.0	▼3.2	8,341	23.9	▼3.8
Conservative	Derek Stillie	5,149	14.8	▼1.2	6,341	18.2	▲1.1
Green					2,427	7.0	▲1.9
Liberal Democrats	Christine Cosh	826	2.4	▼0.3	793	2.3	▲0.3
Alba					590	1.7	New
All for Unity					286	0.8	New
Independent Green Voice					223	0.6	New
Scottish Family					195	0.6	New
Scotia Future	Andy Doig	765	2.2	New	127	0.4	New
Freedom Alliance (UK)					81	0.2	New
Abolish the Scottish Parliament					65	0.2	New
Reform					56	0.2	New
UKIP					49	0.1	▼1.8
Scottish Libertarian					45	0.1	0.0
TUSC					45	0.1	New
Independent	James Morrison				24	0.1	New
Independent	Maurice Campbell				12	0.0	New
Renew					12	0.0	New
Majority		7,106	20.5	▲5.6			
Valid votes		34,698			34,839		
Invalid votes		123			71		
Turnout		34,821	65.7	▲5.4	34,910	65.9	▲5.5
SNP hold		Swing		▲2.8			

=== 2010s ===
2016 Scottish Parliament election: Renfrewshire South
Party	Candidate	Constituency			Regional		
Party	Candidate	Votes	%	±%	Votes	%	±%
SNP	Tom Arthur	14,272	48.1	▲9.6	13,103	44.0	▲5.6
Labour Co-op	Paul O'Kane	9,864	33.2	▼14.9	8,261	27.7	▼13.0
Conservative	Ann Le Blond	4,752	16.0	▲5.2	5,103	17.1	▲7.6
Green					1,513	5.1	▲2.2
Liberal Democrats	Tristan Gray	793	2.7	▲0.1	606	2.0	▲0.1
UKIP					577	1.9	▲1.2
Solidarity					301	1.0	▲0.8
Scottish Christian					182	0.6	▼0.3
RISE					113	0.4	New
Scottish Libertarian					34	0.1	New
Majority		4,408	14.9	N/A			
Valid votes		29,681			29,793		
Invalid votes		129			49		
Turnout		29,810	60.3	▲6.5	29,842	60.4	▲6.6
SNP gain from Labour		Swing		▼12.3			
Notes

2011 Scottish Parliament election: Renfrewshire South
Party	Candidate	Constituency			Regional		
Party	Candidate	Votes	%	±%	Votes	%	±%
Labour	Hugh Henry (Note: Incumbent member on the party list, or for another constituency)	12,943	48.1	-2.9	10,964	40.7	N/A
SNP	Andy Doig	10,356	38.5	+7.9	10,346	38.4	N/A
Conservative	Alistair Campbell	2,917	10.8	-1.7	2,546	9.5	N/A
Green					781	2.9	N/A
Liberal Democrats	Gordon Anderson	702	2.6	-1.7	507	1.9	N/A
All-Scotland Pensioners Party					461	1.7	N/A
Socialist Labour					384	1.4	N/A
Scottish Christian					229	0.9	N/A
BNP					195	0.7	N/A
UKIP					182	0.7	N/A
Ban Bankers Bonuses					113	0.4	N/A
Pirate					93	0.3	N/A
Independent	Richard Vassie				47	0.2	N/A
Solidarity					44	0.2	N/A
Scottish Socialist					41	0.2	N/A
Majority		2,587	9.6	-10.8			
Valid votes		26,908			26,933		
Invalid votes		124			86		
Turnout		27,032	53.8	N/A	27,019	53.8	N/A
Labour win (new seat)							

=== 2000s: Notional result ===
The following is the notional result for the 2007 Scottish Parliament election, as calculated by the BBC.

2007 Scottish Parliament election Notional Result: Renfrewshire South
Party	Candidate	Votes	%	±%
Labour		14,838	51.0	N/A
SNP		8,902	30.6	N/A
Conservative		3,646	12.5	N/A
Liberal Democrats		1,251	4.3	N/A
Others		459	1.6	N/A
Majority		5,936	20.4	N/A
Labour hold		Swing	N/A	
