= Colin Campbell (Scottish politician) =

Scottish politician, born 1938

Member of the Scottish Parliament for West of Scotland
- In office 6 May 1999 – 31 March 2003

Personal details
- Born: 31 August 1938 (age 87) Paisley, Scotland
- Party: Scottish National Party

Colin McIver Campbell (born 31 August 1938) is a Scottish politician and military historian. He was a Scottish National Party (SNP) Member of the Scottish Parliament (MSP) for West of Scotland region from 1999 to 2003. Campbell is a former history teacher and secondary school headmaster.

== Early life ==
Campbell was born on 31 August 1938 in Paisley, Scotland. Campbell was educated at Paisley Grammar School, Glasgow University, and Jordanhill College of Education.

== Career in education ==
Campbell worked in education from 1961 until 1989, teaching history at Hillhead High School in Glasgow, at Paisley Grammar School, Greenock Academy, and becoming the first Deputy Head of Merksworth High School in Paisley. He spent twelve years as Head Teacher of Westwood Secondary, Easterhouse. He has lived in Kilbarchan, West Renfrewshire since 1963.

== Political career ==
He joined the SNP in 1976. He was a member of the Party's National Executive and National Council and the Local Government Committee. He stood unsuccessfully as a SNP candidate in elections for the House of Commons on three occasions: for Renfrew West and Inverclyde in 1987 and 1992, then for West Renfrewshire in 1997. He twice stood for election to the European Parliament in Strathclyde West, losing to Labour's Hugh McMahon in both 1989 and 1994.

In the 1999 Scottish election, he stood as a constituency candidate in West Renfrewshire, where he finished second behind Labour's Trish Godman. He was elected by the regional list.

In Holyrood, he was defence spokesman for the SNP. He did not stand for election in 2003.

== Personal life ==
He is married and has 3 children, 8 grandchildren and 4 great grandchildren.

== Works ==
Campbell has an interest in military history.

- Co-author of Can't Shoot a Man With a Cold, Lt E A Mackintosh MC 1893-1917, Poet of the Highland Division: Colin Campbell & Rosalind Green, Argyll Publishing 2004. ISBN 1-902831-76-4
- Author of Engine of Destruction. The 51st (Highland) Division in the Great War Argyll Publishing 2013 ISBN 978 1 908931 27 6
