= Scottish Jacobite Party =

Defunct Scottish nationalist political party

Scottish Jacobite Party Pàrtaidh Seumasachas Scots Jacobite Pairty
- Leader: John Black
- Treasurer: John Black
- Campaigns Officer: John Brodie
- Founded: 8 July 2005
- Dissolved: 2011
- Ideology: Scottish independence Republicanism; Euroscepticism
- Colours: Red, Tartan

Party flag
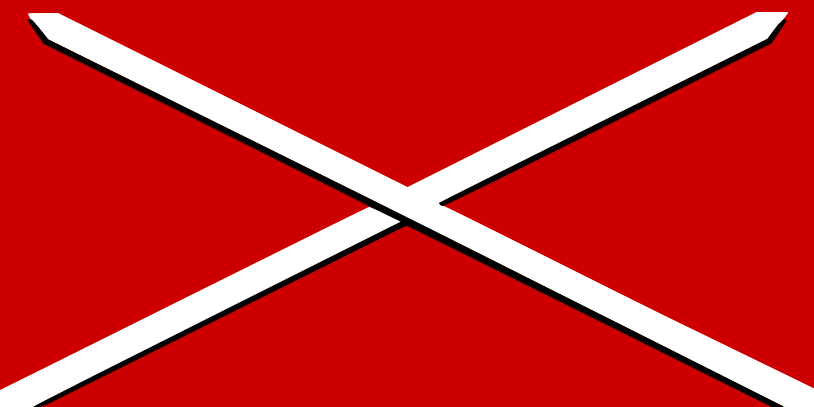

Website
- www.scottishjacobites.com

The Scottish Jacobite Party was a political party in Scotland. It was registered with the Electoral Commission on 8 July 2005, and launched in Glenfinnan to coincide with the 31st G8 summit and roughly with the 260th anniversary of Bonnie Prince Charlie raising his standard there in 1745.

Though Jacobitism means the restoration of the House of Stuart to the throne of Scotland or the UK, the party was republican; leader John Black told The Guardian that "It is an attempt to tie into the romance of Scottish history. Look, if you can rebrand Labour into New Labour, it is surely a minor matter to rebrand "Jacobite" as republican and non-religious". The party's ideal Scottish republic would be outside the European Union but use the euro. The party had three members – the minimum required under British law – and was entirely self-funded.

In the 2007 Scottish elections, the party nominated one candidate, John Black, who won 309 votes in Dumbarton constituency, and 446 votes in the West of Scotland region. Its total expenditure was returned as £528, the lowest of any party to submit a return. It filed an e-petition calling for a Scottish independence day.

The SJP was de-registered and removed from the Electoral Commission's Register of Political Parties on 19 July 2007, but re-registered on 22 March 2010. John Black received 156 votes for this party in the 2010 election in Argyll and Bute. Chris Black polled 134 votes in Berwickshire, Roxburgh and Selkirk. The party de-registered again on 14 March 2011.
