= Paisley South (Scottish Parliament constituency) =

Region or constituency of the Scottish Parliament

- Former county constituency for the Scottish Parliament
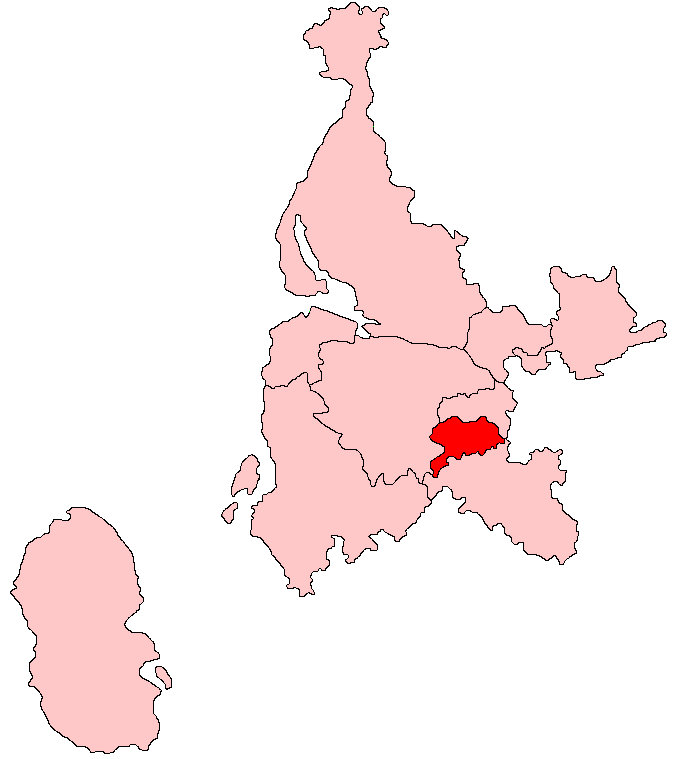

- Paisley South shown within the West of Scotland electoral region and the region shown within Scotland

Former constituency
- Created: 1999
- Abolished: 2011
- Council area: Renfrewshire
- Replaced by: Paisley; Renfrewshire South

Paisley South was a constituency of the Scottish Parliament covering part of the council area of Renfrewshire. It elected one Member of the Scottish Parliament (MSP) by the first past the post method of election. For the 2011 Scottish Parliament election the town of Paisley was split between two new constituencies. The new constituency of Paisley largely replaced both Paisley North and Paisley South; some areas covered by Paisley South were also transferred to the new constituency of Renfrewshire South.

== Electoral region ==
See also West of Scotland (Scottish Parliament electoral region)

Under the additional-member electoral system used for elections to the Scottish Parliament, Paisley South was also one of nine constituencies in the West Scotland electoral region, which elected seven additional members, in addition to the nine constituency MSPs, to produce a form of proportional representation for the region as a whole. Prior to the first periodic review of Scottish Parliament boundaries in 2011, the other eight constituencies of the West of Scotland region were: Dumbarton, Clydebank and Milngavie, Cunninghame North, Eastwood, Greenock and Inverclyde, Paisley North, Strathkelvin and Bearsden and West Renfrewshire.

The region covered the West Dunbartonshire council area, the East Renfrewshire council area, the Inverclyde council area, most of the Renfrewshire council area, most of the East Dunbartonshire council area, part of the Argyll and Bute council area and part of the North Ayrshire council area.

== Constituency boundaries ==
The Paisley South constituency was created for the first election to the Scottish Parliament in 1999, using the name and boundaries of the existing Paisley South constituency of the UK House of Commons. Ahead of the 2005 United Kingdom general election, House of Commons constituencies were altered, whilst the existing Scottish Parliament constituencies were retained.

Paisley South lay entirely within the Renfrewshire council area. The rest of the Renfrewshire area was covered by Paisley North, and West Renfrewshire. The West Renfrewshire constituency also covered a portion of the Inverclyde council area.

== Member of the Scottish Parliament ==
| Election | Member | Party |
|---|---|---|
| 1999 | Hugh Henry | Labour |
| 2011 | constituency abolished: replaced by Paisley | |

== Election results ==
2007 Scottish Parliament election: Paisley South
| Party | Candidate | Votes | % | ±% |
|---|---|---|---|---|
| Labour | Hugh Henry | 12,123 | 47.5 | +6.7 |
| SNP | Fiona McLeod | 7,893 | 30.9 | −0.1 |
| Liberal Democrats | Eileen McCartin | 3,434 | 13.4 | −0.7 |
| Conservative | Tom Begg | 2,077 | 8.1 | +1.0 |
| Majority | | 4,230 | 16.6 | +6.8 |
| Turnout | | 25,527 | 52.7 | +2.6 |
| Labour hold | | Swing | +3.4 | |

2003 Scottish Parliament election: Paisley South
| Party | Candidate | Votes | % | ±% |
|---|---|---|---|---|
| Labour | Hugh Henry | 10,190 | 40.8 | −4.5 |
| SNP | Bill Martin | 7,737 | 31.0 | +0.3 |
| Liberal Democrats | Eileen McCartin | 3,517 | 14.1 | +4.4 |
| Conservative | Mark Jones | 1,775 | 7.1 | −0.9 |
| Scottish Socialist | Frances Curran | 1,765 | 7.1 | New |
| Majority | | 2,453 | 9.8 | −4.8 |
| Turnout | | 24,984 | 50.1 | −7.0 |
| Labour hold | | Swing | | |

1999 Scottish Parliament election: Paisley South
| Party | Candidate | Votes | % | ±% |
|---|---|---|---|---|
| Labour | Hugh Henry | 13,899 | 45.3 | N/A |
| SNP | Bill Martin | 9,404 | 30.7 | N/A |
| Liberal Democrats | Stuart Callison | 2,974 | 9.7 | N/A |
| Conservative | Sheila Laidlaw | 2,433 | 7.9 | N/A |
| Independent | Paul Mack | 1,273 | 4.2 | N/A |
| Socialist Workers | Jackie Forrest | 673 | 2.2 | N/A |
| Majority | | 4,495 | 14.6 | N/A |
| Turnout | | 30,656 | 57.1 | N/A |
| Labour win (new seat) | | | | |

== See also ==
- Paisley South (UK Parliament constituency)
