= West Renfrewshire (Scottish Parliament constituency) =

Region or constituency of the Scottish Parliament

Coordinates: 55.849108°N 4.570312°W

- Former county constituency for the Scottish Parliament
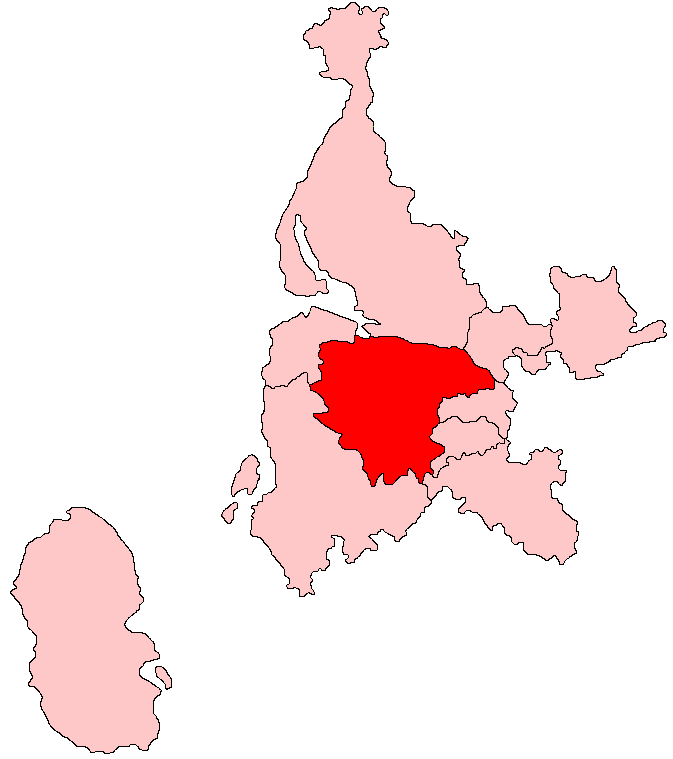

- West Renfrewshire shown within the West of Scotland electoral region and the region shown within Scotland

Former constituency
- Created: 1999
- Abolished: 2011
- Council area: Inverclyde/ Renfrewshire
- Replaced by: Renfrewshire North and West, and Renfrewshire South

West Renfrewshire was a constituency of the Scottish Parliament covering part of the council area of Renfrewshire. It elected one Member of the Scottish Parliament (MSP) by the first past the post method of election. West Renfrewshire was abolished for the 2011 Scottish Parliament election, being replaced by the new constituencies of Renfrewshire North and West and Renfrewshire South.

== Electoral region ==
Under the additional-member electoral system used for elections to the Scottish Parliament, West Renfrewshire was one of nine constituencies in the West Scotland electoral region, which elected seven additional members, in addition to the nine constituency MSPs, to produce a form of proportional representation for the region as a whole. Prior to the first periodic review of Scottish Parliament boundaries in 2011, the other eight constituencies of the West of Scotland region were: Dumbarton, Clydebank and Milngavie, Cunninghame North, Eastwood, Paisley North, Greenock and Inverclyde, Paisley South and Strathkelvin and Bearsden.

The region covered the West Dunbartonshire council area, the East Renfrewshire council area, the Inverclyde council area, most of the Renfrewshire council area, most of the East Dunbartonshire council area, part of the Argyll and Bute council area and part of the North Ayrshire council area.

== Constituency boundaries ==
The West Renfrewshire constituency was created for the first election to the Scottish Parliament in 1999, using the name and boundaries of the existing Westminster constituency. Ahead of the 2005 United Kingdom general election, House of Commons constituencies were altered, whilst the existing Scottish Parliament constituencies were retained.

=== Council areas ===
West Renfrewshire covered a western portion of the Renfrewshire council area and an eastern portion of the Inverclyde council area. The rest of the Renfrewshire area was covered by the Paisley North, Paisley South and Glasgow Govan constituencies; Glasgow Govan was in the Glasgow electoral region. The Greenock and Inverclyde constituency covered the rest of the Inverclyde area. The boundaries of these other constituencies were also redrawn in 2011.

== Member of the Scottish Parliament ==
Election	Member	Party
1999	Trish Godman	Labour
2011	constituency abolished: replaced by Renfrewshire North and West, and Renfrewshire South	

== Election results ==
=== 2000s ===
2007 Scottish Parliament election: West Renfrewshire
Party	Candidate	Votes	%	±%
Labour	Trish Godman	10,467	35.9	+1.8
Conservative	Annabel Goldie	8,289	28.5	+4.2
SNP	Bill Wilson	8,167	28.0	+2.6
Liberal Democrats	Simon Hutton	2,206	7.6	−2.7
Majority		2,178	7.4	−1.3
Turnout		29,129	58.3	+2.8
Labour hold		Swing		

2003 Scottish Parliament election: West Renfrewshire
Party	Candidate	Votes	%	±%
Labour	Trish Godman	9,671	34.1	−3.3
SNP	Bruce McFee	7,179	25.4	−3.6
Conservative	Annabel Goldie	6,867	24.3	+3.0
Liberal Democrats	Alison King	2,902	10.3	+2.5
Scottish Socialist	Gerry MaCartney	1,683	5.95	New
Majority		2,492	8.7	+0.1
Turnout		28,302	55.5	−9.4
Labour hold		Swing	+0.3	

=== 1990s ===
1999 Scottish Parliament election: West Renfrewshire
Party	Candidate	Votes	%	±%
Labour	Trish Godman	12,708	37.4	N/A
SNP	Colin Campbell	9,815	28.8	N/A
Conservative	Annabel Goldie	7,243	21.3	N/A
Liberal Democrats	Neal Ascherson	2,659	7.8	N/A
Independent	Allan McGraw	1,136	3.3	N/A
Socialist Workers	Patrick Clark	476	1.4	N/A
Majority		2,893	8.6	N/A
Turnout		34,037	64.9	N/A
Labour win (new seat)				
