= First periodic review of Scottish Parliament boundaries =

Scottish bill

The First periodic review of Scottish Parliament boundaries was carried out by the Boundary Commission for Scotland. It was announced on 3 July 2007 that the review was taking place. Provisional proposals were published on 14 February 2008 and the final proposals were published on 26 May 2010. The new constituencies and regions were used for the first time at the 2011 Scottish Parliament election.

The Scottish Parliament (Constituencies) Act 2004 requires the commission to review boundaries of all constituencies except Orkney and Shetland (which cover, respectively, the Orkney Islands council area and the Shetland Islands council area) so that the area covered by the reviewed constituencies will continue to be covered by a total of 71 constituencies.

The Orkney and Shetland constituencies were taken into account, however, in review of boundaries of the additional member regions.

Final recommendations followed public consultations and a series of local inquiries, and the terms of the 2004 act required final recommendations to be submitted in a report to the Secretary of State for Scotland.

A second review should have taken place within 12 years of the last; however, by the time of the 2021 Scottish Parliament election this had not taken place. A meeting of the Boundary Commission in 2017 indicated that an extension would be sought by the Scottish Government to have the constituencies reviewed by the time of the next proposed election in 2025 (now 2026).

The second review commenced in September 2022 and is planned to be completed by May 2025 before the next scheduled election.

== Boundary changes ==
For the purposes of the review the Boundary Commission for Scotland must take into account the boundaries of the local government council areas. In order to do this some council areas were grouped together; the largest of these groupings of provisional proposals consisted of four of Scotland's 32 council areas, and the smallest only containing one. Constituencies created in 1999 were based on Scottish Westminster constituencies that were created in 1997 and were based on the boundaries of local government regions and districts and islands areas that existed at that time but have since been abolished and replaced with the council areas.

Following the provisional proposal stages the Commission published their Final Recommendations. All the review processes were completed with the outlined constituencies below.

=== Constituencies ===
Council area or areas	Existing constituency or constituencies	Map of existing	Proposed constituency or constituencies	Map of proposed
Aberdeen City, Aberdeenshire, Angus, and Moray	Aberdeen Central (part of Aberdeen City council area), Aberdeen South (part of Aberdeen City council area), Aberdeen North (part of Aberdeen City council area), Banff and Buchan (part of Aberdeenshire council area), Gordon (part of Aberdeenshire and part of Moray council areas), Moray (part of Moray council area), West Aberdeenshire and Kincardine (part of Aberdeenshire council area), part of Angus (part of Angus council area), and part of North Tayside (part of Angus council area)		Aberdeen Central (part of Aberdeen City council area), Aberdeen Donside (part of Aberdeen City council area), Aberdeen South and North Kincardine (part of Aberdeen City and part of Aberdeenshire council area), Aberdeenshire East (part of Aberdeenshire council area), Aberdeenshire West (part of Aberdeenshire council area), Angus North and Mearns (part of Aberdeenshire and Angus council areas), Angus South (part of Angus council area), Banffshire and Buchan Coast (part of Aberdeenshire council area and part of Moray council area), and Moray (part of Moray council area)	
Argyll and Bute, East Dunbartonshire, and West Dunbartonshire	Argyll and Bute (part of Argyll and Bute council area), Dumbarton (part of Argyll and Bute and part of West Dunbartonshire council areas), Clydebank and Milngavie (part of West Dunbartonshire council area), and Strathkelvin and Bearsden (part of East Dumbartonshire council area)		Argyll and Bute (part of Argyll and Bute council area), Dumbarton (part of Argyll and Bute and West Dunbartonshire council areas), Clydebank and Milngavie (part of East Dumbartonshire and part of West Dunbartonshire council areas), and Strathkelvin and Bearsden (part of East Dumbartonshire council area)	
Clackmannanshire, and Stirling	Stirling (part of Stirling council area), and part of Ochil (Clackmannanshire and part of Stirling council areas)		Clackmannanshire and Dunblane (Clackmannanshire council area and part of Stirling council area), and Stirling (part of Stirling council area)	
Dumfries and Galloway	Dumfries, and Galloway and Upper Nithsdale		Dumfriesshire, and Galloway and West Dumfries	
Dundee City	Dundee East, Dundee West, and parts of Angus		Dundee City East, and Dundee City West	
East Ayrshire, and South Ayrshire,	Ayr (part of South Ayrshire council area), Carrick, Cumnock and Doon Valley (part of East Ayrshire and part of South Ayrshire council areas), Kilmarnock and Loudoun (parts of East Ayrshire council area),		Ayr (part of South Ayrshire council area), Carrick, Cumnock and Doon Valley (part of South Ayrshire and East Ayrshire council areas), Kilmarnock and Irvine Valley (part of East Ayrshire council area),	
East Lothian, Midlothian, and Scottish Borders	East Lothian (part of East Lothian council area), Midlothian (part of Midlothian council area), Roxburgh and Berwickshire (part of Scottish Borders council area), Tweeddale, Ettrick and Lauderdale (part of Scottish Borders and part of Midlothian council areas), and part of Edinburgh East and Musselburgh (part of East Lothian council area)		East Lothian (part of East Lothian council area), Ettrick, Roxburgh and Berwickshire (part of East Lothian and part of Midlothian council areas), Midlothian North and Musselburgh (part of Scottish Borders council area), and Midlothian South, Tweedale and Lauderdale (part of Midlothian and part of Scottish Borders council areas)	|
East Renfrewshire, Inverclyde, and Renfrewshire	Eastwood (East Renfrewshire council area); Greenock and Inverclyde Paisley North Paisley South West Renfrewshire		Eastwood (parts of East Renfrewshire council area) Greenock and Inverclyde (part of Inverclyde council area); Paisley (part of Renfrewshire council area); Renfrewshire North and West (parts of Inverclyde council area and parts of Renfrewshire council area); Renfrewshire South (parts of East Renfrewshire council area and Renfrewshire council area)	
Edinburgh, City of	Edinburgh Central, Edinburgh North and Leith, Edinburgh South, Edinburgh Pentlands, Edinburgh West, and part of Edinburgh East and Musselburgh		Edinburgh Central, Edinburgh Eastern, Edinburgh Northern and Leith, Edinburgh Pentlands, Edinburgh Southern, Edinburgh Western	
Falkirk	Falkirk East, and Falkirk West		Falkirk East, and Falkirk West	
Fife	Central Fife, Dunfermline East, Dunfermline West, Fife North East, and Kirkcaldy		Cowdenbeath, Dunfermline, Kirkcaldy, Mid Fife and Glenrothes, and North East Fife	
Glasgow City	Glasgow Anniesland, Glasgow Baillieston, Glasgow Cathcart, Glasgow Govan, Glasgow Kelvin, Glasgow Maryhill, Glasgow Pollok, Glasgow Shettleston, Glasgow Springburn, and part of Glasgow Rutherglen		Glasgow Anniesland, Glasgow Cathcart, Glasgow Kelvin, Glasgow Maryhill and Springburn, Glasgow Pollok, Glasgow Provan, Glasgow Shettleston, and Glasgow Southside	
Highland	Caithness, Sutherland and Easter Ross, Inverness East, Nairn and Lochaber, and Ross, Skye and Inverness West		Caithness, Sutherland and Ross, Inverness and Nairn, and Skye, Lochaber and Badenoch	
Na h-Eileanan Siar	Western Isles		Na h-Eileanan an Iar	
Perth and Kinross	Perth, part of Angus, part of North Tayside, and part of Ochil		Perthshire North, and Perthshire South and Kinross-shire	
North Ayrshire	Cunninghame North, and Cunninghame South		Cunninghame North, and Cunninghame South	
North Lanarkshire, and South Lanarkshire	Motherwell and Wishaw Airdrie and Shotts Coatbridge and Chryston Cumbernauld and Kilsyth Hamilton North and Bellshill Clydesdale East Kilbride Glasgow Rutherglen(part of South Lanarkshire council area and part of Glasgow City council area) Hamilton South		Airdrie and Shotts, Coatbridge and Chryston, Cumbernauld and Kilsyth, East Kilbride, Falkirk East, Falkirk West, Hamilton, Larkhall and Stonehouse, Motherwell and Wishaw, and Uddingston and Bellshill	
West Lothian	Livingston, Linlithgow		Almond Valley Linlithgow	

=== Electoral regions ===
The Boundary Commission have also recommended changes to the electoral regions used to elect "list" members of the Scottish Parliament. The recommendations can be summarised below;

Region	Constituencies	Map
Central Scotland	Airdrie and Shotts; Coatbridge and Chryston; Cumbernauld and Kilsyth; East Kilbride; Falkirk East; Falkirk West; Hamilton, Larkhall and Stonehouse; Motherwell and Wishaw; Uddingston and Bellshill	
Glasgow	Anniesland; Cathcart; Kelvin; Maryhill and Springburn; Pollok; Provan; Shettleston; Southside; Rutherglen	
Highlands and Islands	Argyll and Bute; Caithness, Sutherland and Ross; Inverness and Nairn; Moray; Na h-Eileanan an Iar; Orkney; Shetland; Skye, Lochaber and Badenoch	
Lothian	Almond Valley; Edinburgh Central; Edinburgh Eastern; Edinburgh Northern and Leith; Edinburgh Pentlands; Edinburgh Southern; Edinburgh Western; Linlithgow; Midlothian North and Musselburgh	
Mid Scotland and Fife	Clackmannanshire and Dunblane; Cowdenbeath; Dunfermline; Kirkcaldy; Mid Fife and Glenrothes; North East Fife; Perthshire North; Perthshire South and Kinross-shire; Stirling	
North East Scotland	Aberdeen Central; Aberdeen Donside; Aberdeen South and North Kincardine; Aberdeenshire East; Aberdeenshire West; Angus North and Mearns; Angus South; Banffshire and Buchan Coast; Dundee City East; Dundee City West	
South Scotland	Ayr; Carrick, Cumnock and Doon Valley; Clydesdale; Dumfriesshire; East Lothian; Ettrick, Roxburgh and Berwickshire; Galloway and West Dumfries; Kilmarnock and Irvine Valley; Midlothian South, Tweeddale, and Lauderdale	
West Scotland	Clydebank and Milngavie; Cunninghame North; Cunninghame South; Dumbarton; Eastwood; Greenock and Inverclyde; Paisley; Renfrewshire North and West; Renfrewshire South; Strathkelvin and Bearsden	
