= Paisley North (Scottish Parliament constituency) =

Region or constituency of the Scottish Parliament

- Former county constituency for the Scottish Parliament
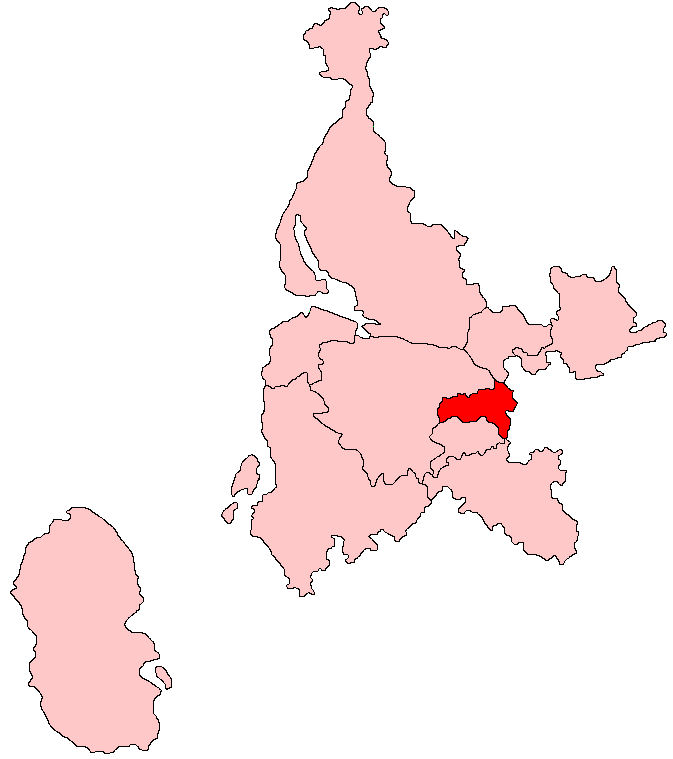

- Paisley North shown within the West of Scotland electoral region and the region shown within Scotland

Former constituency
- Created: 1999
- Abolished: 2011
- Council area: Renfrewshire
- Replaced by: Paisley; Renfrewshire North and West

Paisley North was a constituency of the Scottish Parliament covering part of the council area of Renfrewshire. It elected one Member of the Scottish Parliament (MSP) by the first past the post method of election. For the 2011 Scottish Parliament election the town of Paisley was split between two new constituencies. The new constituency of Paisley largely replaced both Paisley North and Paisley South, whilst Renfrewshire North and West took some parts of the north west of Paisley.

== Electoral region ==
Under the additional-member electoral system used for elections to the Scottish Parliament, Paisley North was also one of nine constituencies in the West Scotland electoral region, which elected seven additional members, in addition to the nine constituency MSPs, to produce a form of proportional representation for the region as a whole. Prior to the first periodic review of Scottish Parliament boundaries in 2011, the other eight constituencies of the West of Scotland region were: Dumbarton, Clydebank and Milngavie, Cunninghame North, Eastwood, Greenock and Inverclyde, Paisley South, Strathkelvin and Bearsden and West Renfrewshire

The region covered the West Dunbartonshire council area, the East Renfrewshire council area, the Inverclyde council area, most of the Renfrewshire council area, most of the East Dunbartonshire council area, part of the Argyll and Bute council area and part of the North Ayrshire council area.

== Constituency boundaries ==
The Paisley North constituency was created for the first election to the Scottish Parliament in 1999, using the name and boundaries of the existing Paisley North constituency of the UK House of Commons. Ahead of the 2005 United Kingdom general election, House of Commons constituencies were altered, whilst the existing Scottish Parliament constituencies were retained.

Paisley North was entirely within the Renfrewshire council area. The rest of the Renfrewshire area was covered by the Paisley South, West Renfrewshire and Glasgow Govan constituencies. The West Renfrewshire constituency also covered a portion of the Inverclyde council area, and the Glasgow Govan constituency also covered a portion of the Glasgow City council area. Glasgow Govan was in the Glasgow electoral region.

== Member of the Scottish Parliament ==
Election	Member	Party
1999	Wendy Alexander	Labour
2011	Constituency abolished: replaced by Paisley	

== Election results ==
2007 Scottish Parliament election: Paisley North
Party	Candidate	Votes	%	±%
Labour	Wendy Alexander	12,111	52.2	+4.3
SNP	Andrew Doig	6,998	30.2	+1.7
Conservative	Malcolm MacAskill	1,721	7.4	−1.0
Liberal Democrats	Angela McGarrigle	1,570	6.8	−0.9
Scottish Socialist	Iain Hogg	525	2.3	−5.3
Independent	John Plott	281	1.2	New
Majority		5,113	22.0	+2.6
Turnout		23,206	53.4	+4.0
Labour hold		Swing	+1.3	

2003 Scottish Parliament election: Paisley North
Party	Candidate	Votes	%	±%
Labour	Wendy Alexander	10,631	47.9	−0.7
SNP	George Adam	6,321	28.5	−3.5
Conservative	Allison Cook	1,871	8.4	+0.3
Liberal Democrats	Brian O'Malley	2,338	7.7	±0.0
Scottish Socialist	Sean Hurl	1,678	7.6	+4.0
Majority		4,310	19.4	+2.8
Turnout		22,206	49.4	−7.3
Labour hold		Swing		

1999 Scottish Parliament election: Paisley North
Party	Candidate	Votes	%	±%
Labour	Wendy Alexander	13,492	48.6	N/A
SNP	Ian MacKay	8,876	32.0	N/A
Conservative	Peter Ramsay	2,242	8.1	N/A
Liberal Democrats	Tamsin Mayberry	2,133	7.7	N/A
Scottish Socialist	Fiona Macdonald	1,007	3.6	N/A
Majority		4,616	16.6	N/A
Turnout		27,750	56.7	N/A
Labour win (new seat)				
