= Paisley (Scottish Parliament constituency) =

Constituency of the Scottish Parliament

- Burgh constituency for the Scottish Parliament
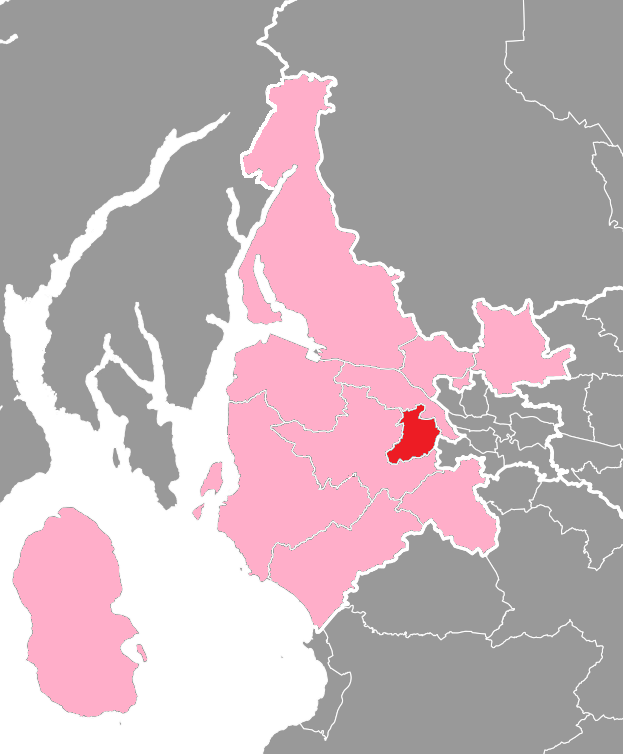

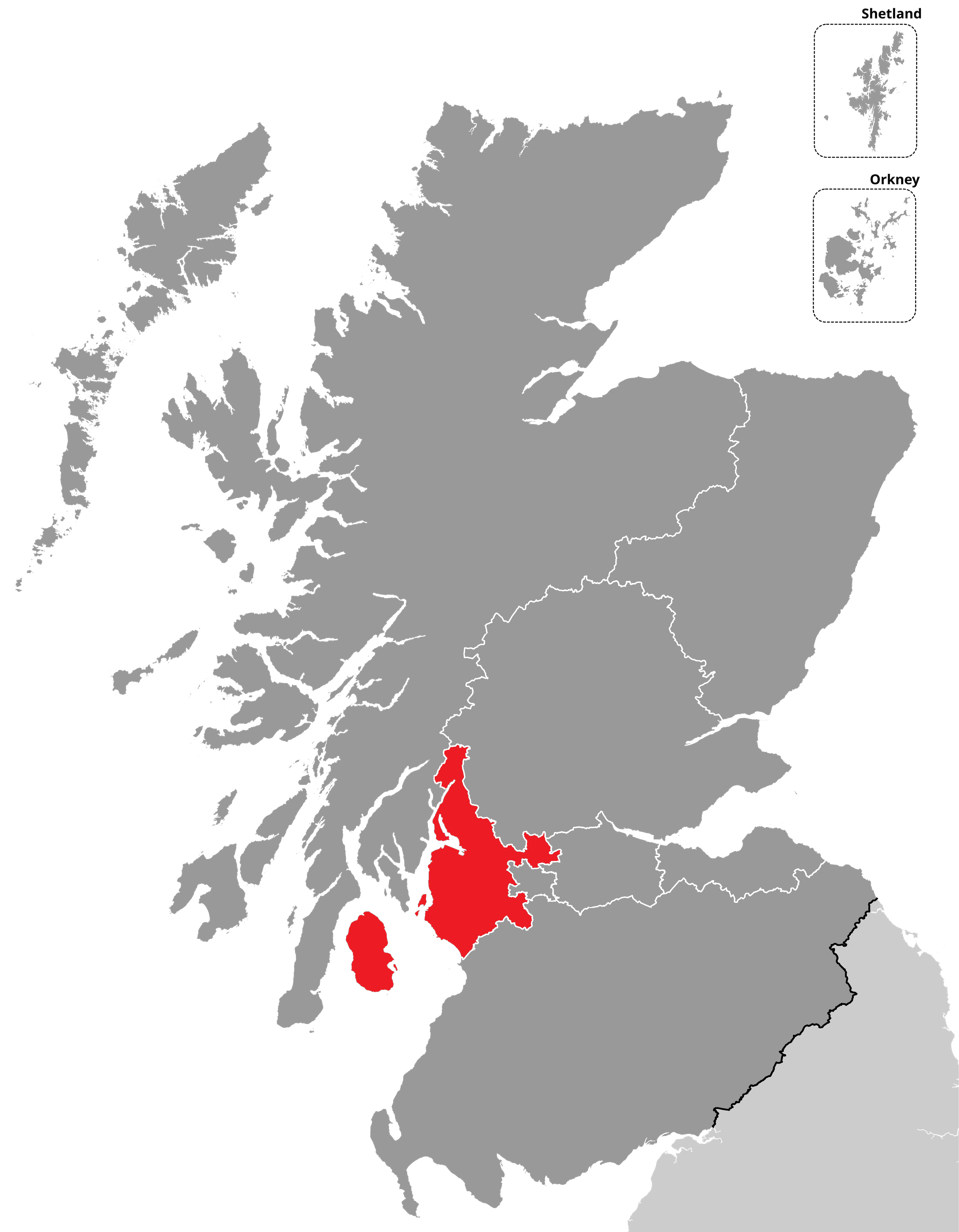
- Paisley shown within the West Scotland electoral region and the region shown within Scotland
- Electoral region: West Scotland
- Electorate: 61,393 (2026)

Current constituency
- Created: 2011
- Party: Scottish National Party
- MSP: George Adam
- Council area: Renfrewshire

Paisley is a burgh constituency of the Scottish Parliament covering the town of Paisley in Renfrewshire council area. Under the additional-member electoral system used for elections to the Scottish Parliament, it elects one Member of the Scottish Parliament (MSP) by the first past the post method of election. It is also one of ten constituencies in the West Scotland electoral region, which elects seven additional members, in addition to the ten constituency MSPs, to produce a form of proportional representation for the region as a whole.

The constituency was created for the 2011 Scottish Parliament election, and covers parts of the former constituencies of Paisley North and Paisley South. It has been held by George Adam of the Scottish National Party (SNP) since its formation.

== Electoral region ==
The other nine constituencies of the West Scotland region are: Cunninghame North, Cunninghame South, Clydebank and Milngavie, Dumbarton, Eastwood, Inverclyde, Renfrewshire North and Cardonald, Renfrewshire West and Levern Valley, and Strathkelvin and Bearsden. The region covers the whole of the council areas of East Dunbartonshire, East Renfrewshire, Inverclyde, North Ayrshire, Renfrewshire, and West Dunbartonshire; and parts of the council areas of Argyll and Bute, East Ayrshire, and Glasgow.

== Constituency boundaries and council area ==
Map of boundaries (2011-2026)

Renfrewshire is represented in the Scottish Parliament by three constituencies: Paisley; Renfrewshire North and Cardonald; and Renfrewshire West and Levern Valley. Renfrewshire North and Cardonald also covers part of the Glasgow council area, whilst Renfrewshire West and Levern Valley also includes part of East Renfrewshire. All three constituencies lie within the West Scotland electoral region.

When first formed by First Periodic Review of Scottish Parliament Boundaries in 2011, the constituency covered most of the town of Paisley, however the Gallowhill area in the northeast of the town was placed in the neighbouring seat of Renfrewshire North and West. Gallowhill, and Glasgow Airport, were added to the constituency at the Second Periodic Review of Scottish Parliament Boundaries in 2025. Following this review, the seat comprises the following electoral wards of Renfrewshire Council.

- Renfrew South and Gallowhill (shared with Renfrewshire North and Cardonald)
- Paisley Northeast and Ralston (entire ward)
- Paisley Northwest (entire ward)
- Paisley East and Central (entire ward)
- Paisley Southeast (entire ward)
- Paisley Southwest (entire ward)

== Constituency profile ==
Paisley is often considered the biggest town in Scotland, and gave its name to the distinctive kidney-shaped "paisley pattern" and the Paisley shawl. Textile and thread manufacture were long the mainstay of Paisley's industry, due to the damp climate and plentiful water, and by the 19th century, the town was a major centre for the weaving industry.

Paisley has a long association with political Radicalism, highlighted by its involvement in the Radical War of 1820, with striking weavers being instrumental in the protests. By 1993, all of Paisley's mills had closed, although they are memorialised in the town's museums and civic history. The decline of industry in the town has led to urban recession, and in 2006, the district of Ferguslie Park was named one of Scotland's most deprived areas by what was then the Scottish Executive. In 2015, the town launched its bid to become UK City of Culture in 2021, becoming one of the five shortlisted candidates, before eventually losing out to Coventry.

The constituency features four railway stations, a major hospital and several notable churches. Most noticeable among the buildings of Paisley is Paisley Abbey in the centre of the town, which dates from the 12th century. Nearby lies St Mirin's Cathedral which is the seat of the Catholic Bishop of Paisley.

== Members ==
Election	Member	Party
2011	George Adam	SNP

== Elections ==
=== 2020s ===
2026 Scottish Parliament election: Paisley (Note: Note that changes in vote share are shown with respect to the notional result of the 2021 election, calculated to account for boundary changes)
Party	Candidate	Constituency			Regional		
Party	Candidate	Votes	%	±%	Votes	%	±%
SNP	George Adam (Note: Incumbent member for this constituency)	13,164	42.6	▼7.8	9,094	29.4	
Labour	Neil Bibby (Note: Incumbent member on the party list, or for another constituency)	10,136	32.8	▲0.8	7,399	24.0	
Reform	Alec Leishman	4,620	15.0	New	5,082	16.5	
Green					4,604	14.9	
Conservative	Satbir Gill	940	3.0	▼0.7	1,504	4.9	
Liberal Democrats	James Kenyon	1,073	3.5	▲0.2	1,144	3.7	
Independent Green Voice					343	1.1	
TUSC	Sinead Daly	297	1.0				
AtLS					266	0.9	
Scottish Family					265	0.9	
Socialist Labour					256	0.8	
Freedom Alliance	Mark Turnbull	212	0.7				
Independent	Paul Mack				176	0.8	
Independent	William Wallace	458	1.5	New	188	0.6	
ISP					161	0.5	
Scottish Socialist					137	0.4	
Liberal					103	0.3	
Alliance for Democracy and Freedom Scotland					72	0.2	
Scottish Common Party					35	0.1	
UKIP					30	0.1	
Scottish Libertarian					15	0.0	
Independent	Paddy McCarthy				12	0.0	
Valid votes		30,900			30,886		
Invalid votes		113			90		
Turnout		31,013	53.2	▼10.0	30,976	50.5	
Majority		3,028	9.8				
SNP hold		Swing		▼4.3			
Notes

2021 Scottish Parliament election: Paisley
Party	Candidate	Constituency			Regional		
Party	Candidate	Votes	%	±%	Votes	%	±%
SNP	George Adam (Note: Incumbent member for this constituency)	17,495	50.0	▲0.2	16,147	46.0	▲0.6
Labour Co-op	Neil Bibby (Note: Incumbent member on the party list, or for another constituency)	11,420	32.7	▲0.5	8,797	25.1	▼2.0
Conservative	Russell Findlay (Note: Elected on the party list)	3,342	9.6	▼2.4	4,934	14.1	▼0.1
Green	Scott Bevan	1,584	4.5	New	2,570	7.3	▲1.5
Liberal Democrats	Eileen McCartin	1,124	3.2	▼2.8	905	2.6	▼0.6
Alba					611	1.7	New
All for Unity					284	0.8	New
Scottish Family					224	0.6	New
Independent Green Voice					160	0.5	New
Freedom Alliance (UK)					102	0.3	New
Reform					77	0.5	New
Abolish the Scottish Parliament					77	0.2	New
TUSC					68	0.2	New
UKIP					57	0.2	▼1.5
Scottish Libertarian					56	0.2	0.0
Renew					12	0.0	New
Scotia Future					12	0.0	New
Independent	James Morrison				9	0.0	New
Independent	Maurice Campbell				7	0.0	New
Majority		6,075	17.3	▼0.3			
Valid votes		34,965			35,109		
Invalid votes		143			62		
Turnout		35,108	62.6	▲5.3	35,171	62.7	▲5.4
SNP hold		Swing		▼0.4			

=== 2010s ===
2016 Scottish Parliament election: Paisley
Party	Candidate	Constituency			Regional		
Party	Candidate	Votes	%	±%	Votes	%	±%
SNP	George Adam (Note: Incumbent member for this constituency)	14,682	49.8	▲7.2	13,423	45.4	▲4.4
Labour Co-op	Neil Bibby (Note: Incumbent member on the party list, or for another constituency)	9,483	32.2	▼9.5	8,005	27.1	▼10.0
Conservative	Paul Masterton	3,533	12.0	▲3.3	4,188	14.2	▲6.3
Green					1,722	5.8	▲2.7
Liberal Democrats	Eileen McCartin	1,766	6.0	▼1.0	954	3.2	▼0.1
UKIP					513	1.7	▲1.2
Solidarity					319	1.1	▲0.9
Scottish Christian					234	0.8	▼0.1
RISE					159	0.5	New
Scottish Libertarian					56	0.2	New
Majority		5,199	17.6	▲16.7			
Valid votes		29,464			29,573		
Invalid votes		128			43		
Turnout		29,592	57.3	▲7.8	29,616	57.3	▲8.0
SNP hold		Swing		▲8.4			
Notes

2011 Scottish Parliament election: Paisley
Party	Candidate	Constituency			Regional		
Party	Candidate	Votes	%	±%	Votes	%	±%
SNP	George Adam	10,913	42.6	N/A	10,494	41.0	N/A
Labour	Ewan Williams	10,665	41.7	N/A	9,479	37.1	N/A
Conservative	Gordon McCaskill	2,229	8.7	N/A	2,022	7.9	N/A
Liberal Democrats	Eileen McCartin	1,783	7.0	N/A	837	3.3	N/A
Green					799	3.1	N/A
All-Scotland Pensioners Party					424	1.7	N/A
Socialist Labour					349	1.4	N/A
Scottish Christian					241	0.9	N/A
Scottish Socialist					201	0.8	N/A
BNP					190	0.7	N/A
Independent	Richard Vassie				158	0.6	N/A
UKIP					136	0.5	N/A
Ban Bankers Bonuses					116	0.5	N/A
Pirate					72	0.3	N/A
Solidarity					53	0.2	N/A
Majority		248	0.9	N/A			
Valid votes		25,590			25,571		
Invalid votes		83			77		
Turnout		25,673	49.1	N/A	25,648	49.3	N/A
SNP win (new seat)							
