= Wendy Alexander =

Scottish politician (born 1963)

The Right Honourable The Baroness Alexander of Cleveden FRSE
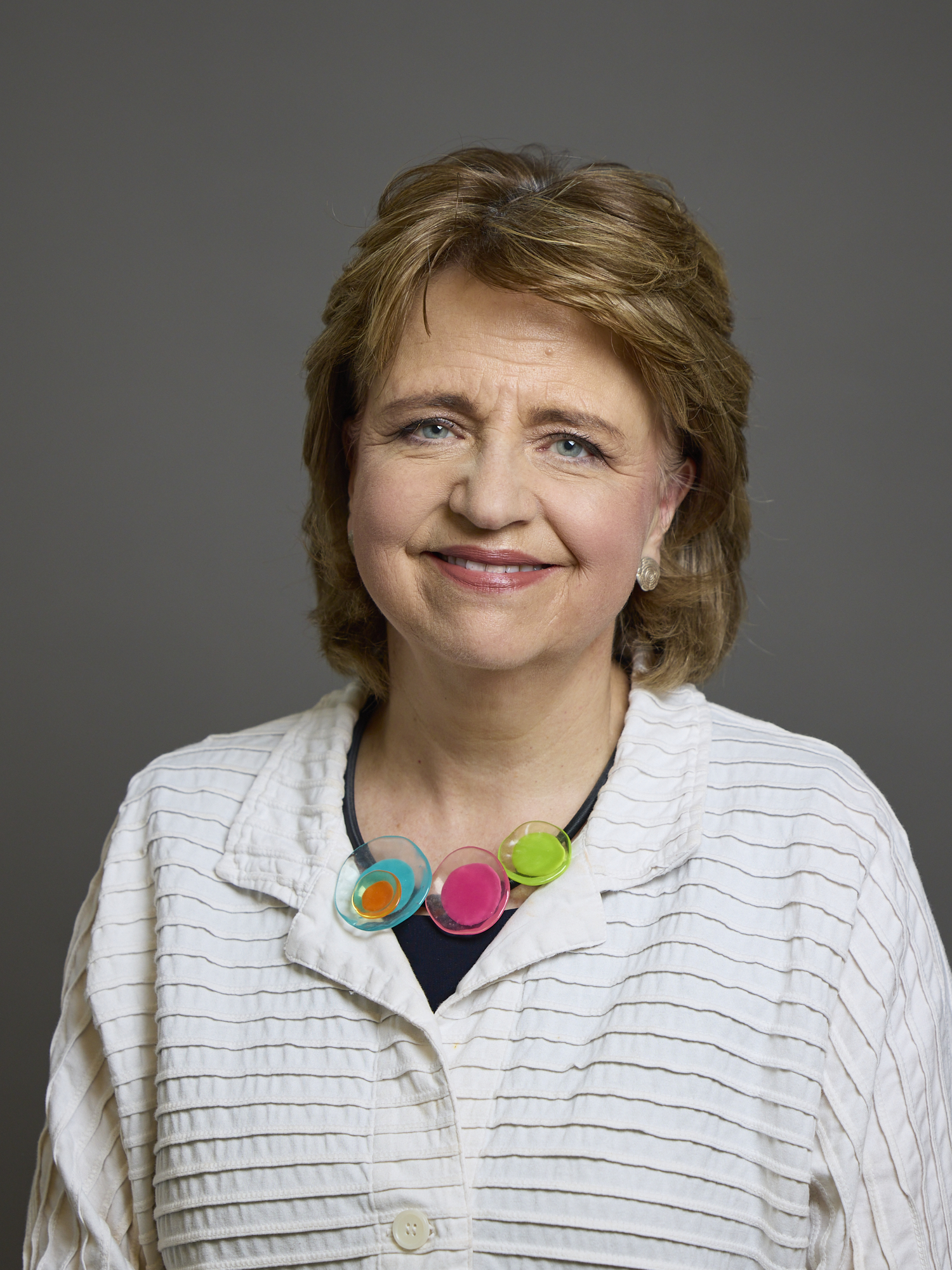
- Official portrait, 2025

Leader of the Labour Party in Scotland
- In office 14 September 2007 – 28 June 2008
- Deputy: Cathy Jamieson
- UK party leader: Gordon Brown
- Preceded by: Jack McConnell (Note: Cathy Jamieson acted from 15 August 2007 to 14 September 2007)
- Succeeded by: Iain Gray (Note: Cathy Jamieson acted from 28 June 2008 to 13 September 2008)
Ministerial offices
Minister for Enterprise, Transport and Lifelong Learning
In office 1 November 2000 – 3 May 2002
First Minister	Henry McLeish; Jim Wallace (Acting); Jack McConnell
Preceded by	Henry McLeish (Enterprise and Lifelong Learning); Sarah Boyack (Transport and Planning)
Succeeded by	Iain Gray
Minister for Communities
In office 19 May 1999 – 1 November 2000
First Minister	Donald Dewar; Jim Wallace (Acting)
Preceded by	Position established
Succeeded by	Jackie Baillie

Member of the House of Lords
- Lord Temporal
- Life peerage 3 February 2025

Member of the Scottish Parliament for Paisley North
- In office 6 May 1999 – 22 March 2011
- Preceded by: Constituency established
- Succeeded by: Constituency abolished

Personal details
- Born: 27 June 1963 (age 63) Glasgow, Scotland
- Party: Labour
- Relations: Douglas Alexander (brother)
- Children: 2
- Education: University of Glasgow; University of Warwick; INSEAD

Wendy Cowan Alexander, Baroness Alexander of Cleveden (born 27 June 1963) is a Scottish former politician and life peer appointed in 2025. She represented Paisley North in the Scottish Parliament from 1999 to 2011, held several ministerial posts, and led Scottish Labour from 2007 to 2008.

Alexander became a trustee of the British Council in 2022 and its deputy chair in December 2024. She became chair of the Electrotechnical Sector Joint Industry Board in January 2025. Since January 2026, she has served on the House of Lords Liaison Committee and the Numeracy for Life Committee. She is also a member of the Investment Advisory Board of Scottish Equity Partners.

She was elected a Fellow of the Royal Society of Edinburgh in March 2016. In November 2017, she was appointed the Scottish Government's Trade and Investment Envoy for Higher Education. From 2021 to 2025, Alexander chaired the International Education Advisory Board of Times Higher Education and served on the UK Education Sector Advisory Group, supported by the Department for International Trade and the Department for Education. From 2017 to 2025, she served as a patron of Social Investment Scotland.

Alexander worked in international higher education, initially as a member of the leadership team at London Business School from 2012 to 2015 and subsequently as Vice-Principal (International) and Professor of International Education at the University of Dundee from 2015 to 2024.

== Early life and education ==
Alexander was born on 27 June 1963 in Glasgow, Scotland to Joyce and Douglas Alexander. She has a younger brother, Labour Party politician Douglas Alexander, who has served as an MP and the UK cabinet minister.

Alexander attended Park Mains High School in Erskine and Lester B. Pearson United World College of the Pacific in British Columbia. She graduated from the University of Glasgow with a first-class MA (Hons), followed by a postgraduate MA from the University of Warwick and an MBA from INSEAD in 1994. She holds honorary degrees from the University of Strathclyde, awarded in 2007, and the University of the West of Scotland, awarded in 2012.

== Early career ==
After her MBA, Alexander joined the management consultancy Booz & Co., working across Europe, Asia, North America, and Australasia.

=== Adviser to Donald Dewar ===
In 1997, Alexander was appointed Special Adviser to Donald Dewar, then Secretary of State for Scotland. She worked on the Scottish devolution white paper, the Scotland Act 1998, and plans for the establishment of the Scottish Parliament.

== Political career ==
=== Member of Scottish Parliament ===
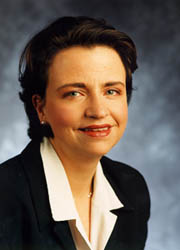
Official portrait as a government minister, c. 1999–2002

Alexander represented Paisley North from the establishment of the Scottish Parliament in 1999 until 2011.

From 1999 to 2002, Alexander was a Scottish Government minister, first serving as Minister for Communities, then as Minister for Enterprise and Lifelong Learning, and subsequently as Minister for Enterprise, Transport and Lifelong Learning.

As Communities Minister, she introduced a free central heating installation programme for pensioners without adequate systems. She also oversaw the Scottish Executive's first social justice strategy, A Scotland Where Everyone Matters: Our Vision for Social Justice, which set targets for reducing child poverty and improving social inclusion, with annual reports used to measure progress.

Alexander established the Homelessness Task Force, whose recommendations contributed to new legislation. She supported transferring public housing to tenant-controlled organizations and removing £1.6 billion of Glasgow's housing debt. Glasgow tenants later voted by a margin of two to one to transfer approximately 89,000 homes.

She backed the repeal of Section 28, which prohibited local authorities from promoting homosexuality. The repeal formed part of the Ethical Standards in Public Life etc. (Scotland) Act and was approved by the Scottish Parliament by 99 votes to 17. During the final debate, Alexander said the change would promote tolerance, clarify the law for teachers, and help address bullying in schools.

She oversaw the Scottish Executive's response to the McIntosh Commission on local government. The resulting reforms gave local authorities a leading role in community planning, created a power of community initiative, later known as the power of well-being, and established the Renewing Local Democracy Working Group to examine electoral systems.

Alexander also announced plans for a statutory duty requiring local government services to secure best value.

She presented the first equality statement to the Scottish Parliament, established the Scottish Executive's Equalities Unit, and announced the Domestic Abuse Service Development Fund, Scotland's first national fund dedicated to tackling violence against women. She established a national loan fund for social enterprises, administered by the newly created Social Investment Scotland. The fund was designed to support the voluntary sector alongside the public and private sectors.

As Enterprise Minister Alexander launched “Smart, Successful Scotland”, a new economic strategy for Scotland supporting high-skill, high-value investment. She launched Scotland's first ever Science strategy and developed a commercialization pipeline. This included the Proof of Concept Fund and the Scottish Co-Investment Fund to stimulate private venture capital investment in emerging businesses.

Alexander promoted Scotland's first broadband strategy and measures to reduce the digital divide, and skills policies including doubling the number of Modern Apprenticeships and jointly leading the Clyde Shipyards Taskforce. Following job losses in the electronics industry, including at Motorola, she introduced an employment-support initiative that later became Partnership Action for Continuing Employment.

As the minister responsible for skills and lifelong learning, Alexander promoted stronger links between universities and businesses, reforms to university management, and wider access to higher education. She also extended Educational Maintenance Allowances to support pupils from low income families to complete their schooling.

She launched Global Connections, an international economic strategy aligned with A Smart, Successful Scotland. It brought Scotland's inward-investment and export agencies together under Scottish Development International and established the GlobalScot network. to develop and expand Scotland's standing in the global business community.

Alexander resigned from ministerial office on 4 May 2002. She later became a visiting professor at the Strathclyde Business School and chaired the Scottish Parliament's Finance Committee. She created the Allander Series of seminars on Scotland’s economic future. Participants included economists William Baumol, Ed Glaeser and Nobel laureates James Heckman and Paul Krugman, who discussed early intervention, innovation, and the economic role of cities.

She also authored Chasing the Tartan Tiger: Lessons from a Celtic Cousin? (2003), co-edited (with Diane Coyle and Brian Ashcroft) New Wealth for Old Nations: Scotland's Economic Prospects (2005), edited an anthology of essays on the life of the late First Minister, Donald Dewar: Scotland's first First Minister (2005) and wrote a non-political column for young mothers in the Daily Record.

=== Leader of the Labour Party in Scotland ===
==== Election ====
Following the May 2007 Scottish Parliament election, Alexander became Shadow Cabinet Secretary for Finance and Sustainable Growth. After Jack McConnell resigned as leader in August 2007, she announced her candidacy to succeed him. Her stated priorities were to renew the party organisation, reform its policies, and reconnect Scottish Labour with voters. After the other potential candidates withdrew, Labour MSPs elected her unopposed on 14 September 2007.

Alexander argued that Scottish Labour needed major organisational and policy reform following its electoral defeat She outlined her position in Scottish Labour New Directions: Change is what we do and called for the party to present itself as Scotland’s progressive and internationalist political force.

She proposed opening candidate selection to Labour supporters through primary elections. Her policy initiatives included establishing a Literacy Commission, to examine standards in Scottish schools. Several of its proposals later received support from other parties in the Scottish Parliament.

==== Calman Commission ====
Alexander made a speech at the University of Edinburgh on Saint Andrew's Day 2007 in which she set out the case for a wide-ranging review of the devolution settlement, with a view to identifying possible areas for reform. The speech laid out her proposals for "a more balanced home rule package" including greater financial accountability and new tax powers for the Scottish Parliament (a cause that she had first championed when she led the Allander Series) in order that the "Union become a more comfortable home for all its members". She said "Scotland wants to see a future that allows her to walk taller within the UK without walking out" and called for a new "expert-led and independent" Scottish constitutional commission.

As the leader of the Labour Party in Scotland, she set this in motion by working with the Conservative and Liberal Democrat leaders to set up the Commission on Scottish Devolution (aka the Calman Commission) in a "bold cross-party, cross-border initiative". The review was established by a vote of the Scottish Parliament. The Calman Commission became a unique Scottish Parliament-UK Government joint venture which reported back to the Parliament in June 2009 proposing wide-ranging changes in the financing of the Scottish Parliament. Alexander wrote then "history teaches that constitutional reform has never been gifted to Scotland. It has to be fought and argued for... Calman will shape the next phase of Scotland's journey…[with] a range of common sense measures to improve relationships".

On St. Andrew's Day 2010, the UK Government introduced a new Scotland Bill. The proposals in the bill closely followed the commission's recommendations and proposed major new financial powers, giving Holyrood control of a third of its budget. In December 2010 Alexander was appointed convener of the Scottish Parliament's Committee to report on the bill.

==== Scottish independence referendum ====
During a TV interview on 4 May 2008, Wendy Alexander suggested that she would be willing to support a referendum on Scottish independence saying "Bring it on!" It was a bold move, but led to suggestions of a rift between her and the Prime Minister, who did not overtly back her. On 7 May, at Prime Minister's Questions, Prime Minister, Gordon Brown stated that she was not, in fact, offering Labour's support for an immediate referendum.

During First Minister's Questions in the Scottish Parliament, on 8 May, Alexander asked Alex Salmond to bring forward a referendum bill at the first opportunity. Alex Salmond declined the offer of Labour support for a referendum, preferring to delay by at least a further year, saying "We will stick to what was laid out in pages 8 and 15 of the SNP manifesto".

==== Resignation ====
In 2007, Alexander's leadership campaign accepted a £950 donation from an ineligible donor Paul Green. The contribution was forfeited, and the Electoral Commission and Crown Office took no further action after reviewing the case. Although a parliamentary committee recommended a one-day suspension over the registration of campaign donations, the Scottish Parliament rejected the proposal. Alexander resigned as Scottish Labour leader in June 2008. She subsequently stated it had been a mistake for her to take on the leadership of the Labour Party in Scotland while her children were so young.

=== Post-leadership ===
From 2008 to 2011, Alexander served on the Scottish Parliament's Economy, Energy and Tourism Committee. She also convened the Scotland Bill Committee, which published its report in March 2011. It proposed greater fiscal autonomy, expanded borrowing powers, the ability to issue bonds, and further tax devolution. Although the Scottish Government had initially opposed the bill, it supported the committee's recommendations. The Scottish Parliament approved the report by 121 votes to three. In her final speech on the Scotland Bill, Alexander described the process as cooperative and cross-party. She argued that the bill represented the most extensive transfer of financial powers from London since the creation of the Union.

Alexander stood down at the Scottish Parliament elections in May 2011 to pursue a career outside active politics. She later served on the advisory boards of the Social Market Foundation and Reform Scotland.

Alexander was a visiting professor at the University of Strathclyde and was subsequently appointed associate dean at London Business School, where she served from 2012 to 2015. In April 2015, she was appointed Vice-Principal (International) and Professor of International Education by the University of Dundee. During her tenure at the University of Dundee, Alexander raised concerns about the university's financial assumptions, management accounts and projected deficit before the scale of the crisis became widely known. She declined a proposed financial settlement and overseas assignments and retired instead. An independent review later found serious failures in financial reporting and governance, supporting several of her concerns.

She was elected a Fellow of the Royal Society of Edinburgh in March 2016. In November 2017, she was appointed the Scottish Government's Trade and Investment Envoy for Higher Education. From 2021 to 2025, Alexander chaired the International Education Advisory Board of Times Higher Education and served on the UK Education Sector Advisory Group, supported by the Department for International Trade and the Department for Education.

From 2017 to 2025, she served as a patron of Social Investment Scotland. She is also a member of the Investment Advisory Board of Scottish Equity Partners.

=== House of Lords ===
In December 2024, Alexander was nominated for a life peerage as part of the 2024 Political Peerages; she was created Baroness Alexander of Cleveden, of Cleveden in the City of Glasgow on 3 February 2025 and made her maiden speech on 6 March 2025. Since January 2026, she has served on the House of Lords Liaison Committee and the Numeracy for Life Committee.

== Personal life ==
Alexander was previously married to economist Brian Ashcroft with whom she had twins. She is a member of Kelvin West Church.

== See also ==
- List of Scottish Executive Ministerial Teams
- Scotland Bill 2010-11

== Notes ==
Scottish Parliament
Constituency created	Member of the Scottish Parliament for Paisley North; 1999–2011	Constituency abolished
Political offices
Office created	Minister for Communities; 1999–2000	Succeeded by Jackie Baillie
Preceded by Henry McLeish	Minister for Enterprise and Lifelong Learning; 2000–2001	Office abolished
Office created	Minister for Enterprise, Transport and Lifelong Learning; 2001–2002	Succeeded by Iain Gray
Party political offices
Preceded by Jack McConnell	Leader of the Labour Party in Scotland in the Scottish Parliament; 2007–2008	Succeeded by Iain Gray
