= Lloyd Quinan =

Scottish politician (born 1957)

Member of the Scottish Parliament for West of Scotland (1 of 7 Regional MSPs)
- In office 6 May 1999 – 31 March 2003

Personal details
- Born: 29 April 1957 (age 68) Edinburgh, Scotland, UK
- Party: SNP (1974–2003, 2014–present)
- Other political affiliations: SSP (2003–2004)
- Education: St. Augustine's High School; Leith Academy; Queen Margaret University
- Occupation: Television Producer; Presenter; Director
- Profession: Politician

Lloyd John Quinan (born 29 April 1957) is a Scottish broadcaster and pro-independence politician. He was a Scottish National Party (SNP) Member of the Scottish Parliament (MSP) for the West of Scotland region from 1999 to 2003.

Born and raised in Edinburgh, Quinan is a longtime campaigner for Scottish independence, initially joining the Scottish National Party in 1974, later leaving in 2003. In 2015 the SNP selected him as a list candidate for the Lothian region.

== Theatre and television career ==
A trained actor, he appeared in theatres throughout Scotland, including the Royal Lyceum, the Traverse, Perth Theatre, the Tron, Eden Court and the Pavilion. He was assistant director of the Scottish Theatre Company and founder of the independent company, United Artists (Scotland).

He directed new plays by Peter Arnott and George Gunn as well as the first Scottish production of Howard Barker's Pity In History. Working as a freelance director he worked with many companies and theatres including the Citizens Theatre Glasgow, Unit One, the Traverse, Mayfest, the Borders Festival, Craigmillar Festival Society and directed plays, pantomimes and community pageants. He was an elected member of the Scottish committee of the Equity Union for 12 years. Like so many theatre workers he had a parallel career in television appearing in a number of dramas for BBC Scotland, Granada, STV and ITV. While working for STV in 1983 he became a presenter in the education department making over 200 programmes on Scottish history and society.

In 1994 he returned to STV as a weather presenter on the station's lunchtime show. In 1995 he succeeded Bernard Ponsonby as the presenter of Trial By Night, a late night debate show.

In 1996 he was producer/director on the Scottish Reporters series and co-produced The Professional Beggar for ITV First Tuesday. Quinan was an elected official of the National Union of Journalists and was involved in the work to rule dispute at the station. In 1998, he left STV after an acrimonious contract dispute. From 1998 to 1999 Quinan worked as for Channel 4 News, UTV and RTÉ as a presenter/director.

== Political career ==
=== Scottish Parliament ===
In 1999 he was elected to represent the West of Scotland as an SNP candidate at the first Scottish Parliament election.

During his time as an MSP, he served as the SNP's Deputy spokesperson for Social Inclusion 1999-2000, a member of the European Committee and the Audit Committee. He also served as Convener of the Cross Party Group on Autism in the Scottish Parliament, Vice-Convener of the Cross Party Group on Contemporary Music and was a member of the Cross Party Groups on Palestine and Cuba.

An active anti-nuclear campaigner, Quinan was twice arrested for breach of the peace during blockades of the Faslane Nuclear Submarine base during his time as an MSP. Quinan went on to challenge his conviction in the High Court of Justiciary introducing a point of law which resulted in one of his convictions being set aside, this was seen as a minor victory for the anti-nuclear movement in Scotland.

In 2002, while a vice-convener of the Scottish Parliament's cross-party group on Palestine, Quinan visited the Middle East on a week-long tour, linking with the Red Crescent and International Solidarity Movement. Quinan travelled to the West Bank as part of a group, but Israelis soldiers denied them entrance to Yasser Arafat's compound in Ramallah. The Israeli security forces shot at him and fired stun grenades in order to force him away.

For the 2003 Parliament election Quinan stood down from being a candidate in the West of Scotland, and instead sought nomination in his home city of Edinburgh. Quinan was unsuccessful in his bid, and went on to unsuccessfully contest the seat of Motherwell and Wishaw at the 2003 election. The seat was held by the Labour candidate, First Minister Jack McConnell.

=== After Parliament ===
In December 2003 Quinan left the SNP for the Scottish Socialist Party (SSP), explaining that he felt the SNP no longer represented his political beliefs. Quinan subsequently unsuccessfully attempted to become one of the SSP's candidates for the 2004 European Parliament election. He left the SSP later that year.

Quinan was a 'Yes' supporter who was active during the 2014 Scottish independence referendum campaign. At one public meeting in North Berwick where he spoke, some of his closing remarks were seized upon by sections of the No campaign. Quinan had said that Scottish people "have an opportunity to change the lives and life chances of our children for the future", but added that "if you vote 'No' [and] you leave them with more of the same, then you're a bad parent."

Having returned to the SNP in 2014, Quinan represented the party in the 2016 Scottish parliamentary election as a candidate for the Lothian region, but was not elected.

== Personal life ==
Quinan is a Hibernian F.C. supporter.
