= Hugh Henry =

Scottish Labour politician and Member of the Scottish Parliament

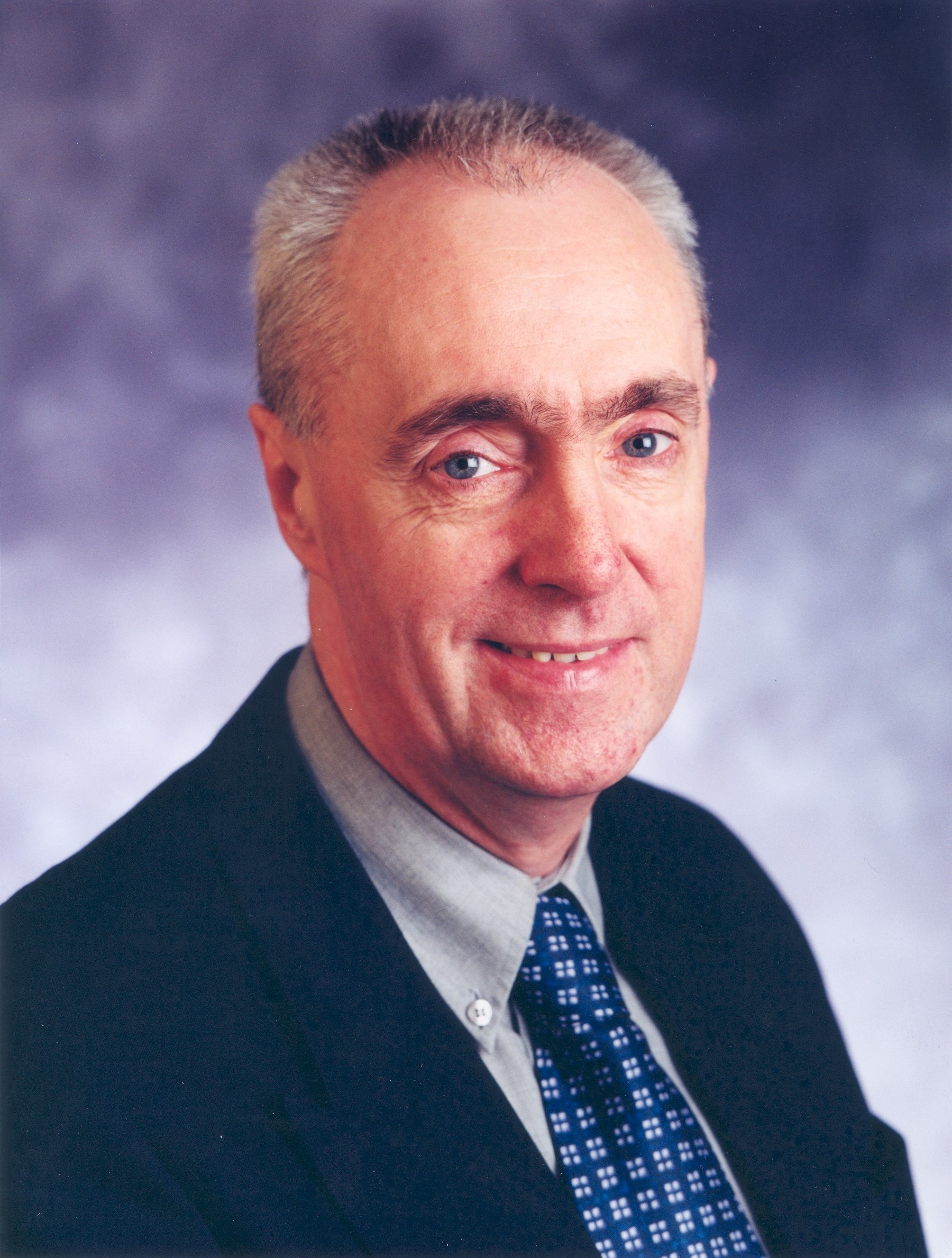
- Official portrait, 2006

Convener of the Public Audit Committee
- In office 26 September 2007 – 24 March 2016
- Preceded by: Charlie Gordon
- Succeeded by: Jenny Marra

Member of the Scottish Parliament for Renfrewshire South Paisley South (1999–2011)
- In office 6 May 1999 – 24 March 2016
- Preceded by: Constituency established
- Succeeded by: Tom Arthur

Personal details
- Born: 12 February 1952 (age 74) Glasgow, Scotland
- Party: Scottish Labour
- Education: University of Glasgow

Hugh Henry (born 12 February 1952) is a former Scottish Labour Party politician. He was the Member of the Scottish Parliament (MSP) for Renfrewshire South, formerly Paisley South, from 1999 to 2016.

== Background ==
Henry was born in Glasgow and raised in Erskine, Renfrewshire. He was educated at St Mirin's Academy in Paisley, the University of Glasgow and Jordanhill College of Education in Glasgow. Prior to working in politics, he worked as an accountant with IBM UK Ltd, as a teacher and as a welfare rights officer with Strathclyde Regional Council. He was a local councillor from 1984 until 1999, including 4 years as leader of Renfrewshire Council. A former Marxist, he was once a supporter of the Militant tendency.

== Member of the Scottish Parliament ==
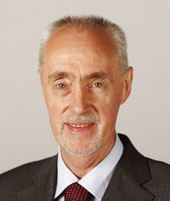
Official parliamentary portrait, 2011

Henry was appointed Deputy Minister for Health and Community Care in the Scottish Executive in 2001, and moved to become Deputy Minister for Social Justice in 2002. He was appointed Deputy Minister for Justice after the 2003 Scottish Parliament election, and became Minister for Education in 2006. He retained the education brief in opposition after the 2007 election. Henry was named Scottish Politician of the Year in 2010, for his performance as Convenor of the Public Affairs Committee. On 11 May 2011, Henry stood in the election for the 4th Presiding Officer of the Scottish Parliament, coming second to Tricia Marwick, a Scottish National Party MSP. He stood down from the Scottish Parliament on 23 March 2016.

== Personal life ==
Henry is married with two daughters and one son.

Scottish Parliament
New parliament Scotland Act 1998	Member of the Scottish Parliament for Paisley South; 1999–2011	Constituency abolished
New constituency	Member of the Scottish Parliament for Renfrewshire South; 2011–2016	Succeeded by Tom Arthur
Political offices
Preceded by Peter Peacock	Minister for Education and Young People; 2006–2007	Succeeded by Fiona Hyslop as Cabinet Secretary for Education and Lifelong Learning
Preceded by Richard Simpson	Deputy Minister for Justice; 2002–2006	Succeeded by Johann Lamont
Preceded by Malcolm Chisholm	Deputy Minister for Health and Community Care; 2001–2002	Succeeded by Frank McAveety
