= Trish Godman =

Scottish politician (1939–2019)

Deputy Presiding Officer of the Scottish Parliament
- In office 7 May 2003 – 22 March 2011 Serving with Murray Tosh (2003–2007) and Alasdair Morgan (2007–2011)
- Presiding Officer: George Reid; Alex Fergusson
- Preceded by: George Reid
- Succeeded by: Elaine Smith

Member of the Scottish Parliament for West Renfrewshire
- In office 6 May 1999 – 22 March 2011
- Preceded by: Constituency established
- Succeeded by: Constituency abolished

Personal details
- Born: Patricia Leonard; 31 October 1939 Glasgow, Scotland, UK
- Died: 21 July 2019 (aged 79) Clydebank, West Dunbartonshire, Scotland, UK
- Party: Scottish Labour
- Spouse: Norman Godman
- Children: 3

Patricia Godman (née Leonard; 31 October 1939 – 21 July 2019) was a Scottish Labour politician who served as Deputy Presiding Officer of the Scottish Parliament from 2003-11. She was the Member of the Scottish Parliament (MSP) for the West Renfrewshire constituency from 1999 to 2011.

== Background ==
The daughter of Martin Leonard and Cathie Craig, Godman was a Glasgow City councillor before entering the Scottish Parliament.

After leaving St Gerard's Senior Secondary School at fifteen, Godman worked with a charity for some time, as a waitress, in a bar, insurance collector and a house mother in a list 'D' school. She later attended Jordanhill College where she trained as a social worker. She worked as a social worker working in the East End of Glasgow from 1979-89.

From 2003-11, Godman was a Deputy Presiding Officer of the Scottish Parliament. In 2008, it was revealed she was costing the taxpayer around £30,000 for hotel bills although she was renting a flat from her son Gary Mulgrew. She did not qualify for the rental expenses allowance as her main residence in Glasgow was too close to Holyrood to qualify, but claimed rent rather than hotel expenses. She was entitled to an overnight expenses allowance that permitted MSPs to recoup expenses for each night, which she had paid for the rent of the apartment. It was confirmed that she had neither broken the Parliamentary rules, nor benefitted in any way.

On her final day in parliament, Godman wore a Celtic FC shirt in Holyrood. A few days later, a bomb addressed to her office was intercepted, with similar devices being sent to Celtic manager Neil Lennon and Paul McBride, Lennon's legal representative. It was believed that Godman was targeted for wearing the shirt. Trevor Muirhead and Neil McKenzie were later convicted for sending the bombs.

== Personal life ==
Godman married her second husband Norman Godman in 1981, who was the Member of Parliament for Greenock and Inverclyde and its predecessor seat Greenock and Port Glasgow from 1983-2001. She had three sons by her first husband, from whom she separated aged 22 due to his infidelity. One, Gary Mulgrew, was one of the NatWest Three. Her experience with his extradition inspired her to take an active role in opposing Gary McKinnon's extradition to the United States in a similar case.

Godman died on 21 July 2019 in Clydebank, after fighting with a terminal illness.

Scottish Parliament
New parliament Scotland Act 1998	Member of the Scottish Parliament for West Renfrewshire; 1999–2011	Constituency abolished
