= Scottish Parliament (Constituencies) Act 2004 =

Act of the Parliament of the United Kingdom

Scottish Parliament (Constituencies) Act 2004 (Note: Section 4.)
- Act of Parliament
- Parliament of the United Kingdom
- Long title: An Act to replace Schedule 1 to the Scotland Act 1998 making new provision in relation to the constituencies for the Scottish Parliament.
- Citation: 2004 c. 13
- Territorial extent: United Kingdom

Dates
- Royal assent: 22 July 2004
- Commencement: 22 July 2004 (Note: Section 4(b) of the Interpretation Act 1978.)
Other legislation
Amends	Scotland Act 1998; Political Parties, Elections and Referendums Act 2000
Amended by	Scotland Act 2012

Status: Amended

Text of statute as originally enacted

Revised text of statute as amended

The Scottish Parliament (Constituencies) Act 2004 (c. 13) is an act of the Parliament of the United Kingdom which severed the link between Scottish Parliament constituencies and Scottish Westminster constituencies.

== Background ==
Before the act, the Scotland Act 1998 had required that Scottish Parliament constituencies and the Scottish Westminster constituencies shared the same boundaries.

In the November 2003 Queen's speech, the United Kingdom Government committed to retaining all 129 MSPs.

== Provisions ==
The act amended the Scotland Act 1998 to remove the link between Scottish Parliament boundaries and Scottish Westminster boundaries. The act allowed for the number of Scottish Westminster constituencies to be reduced to 59, while keeping the number of Scottish Parliament constituencies.

== Reception ==
The legislation was criticised by Jimmy Hood, Labour MP for Clydesdale, as gerrymandering. Tory MP Peter Duncan described the legislation as "unnecessary".
