= Dumbarton (Scottish Parliament constituency) =

Region or constituency of the Scottish Parliament

- County constituency for the Scottish Parliament
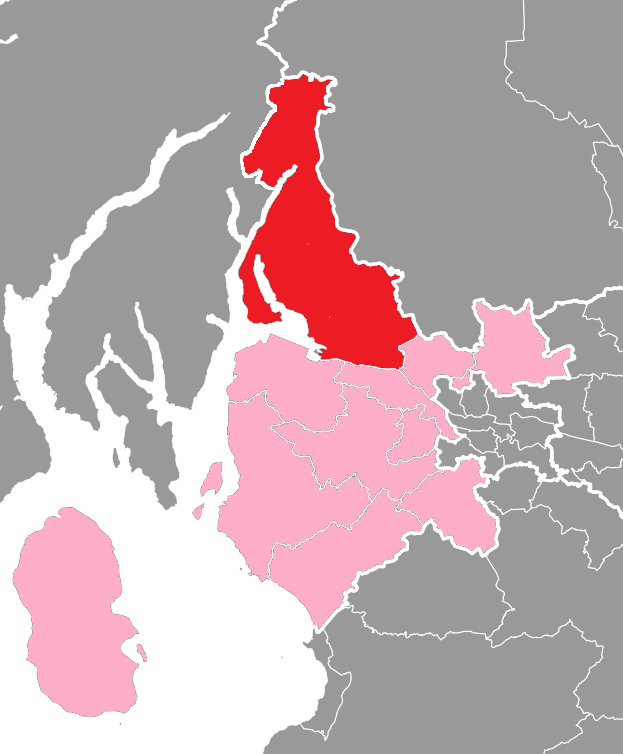

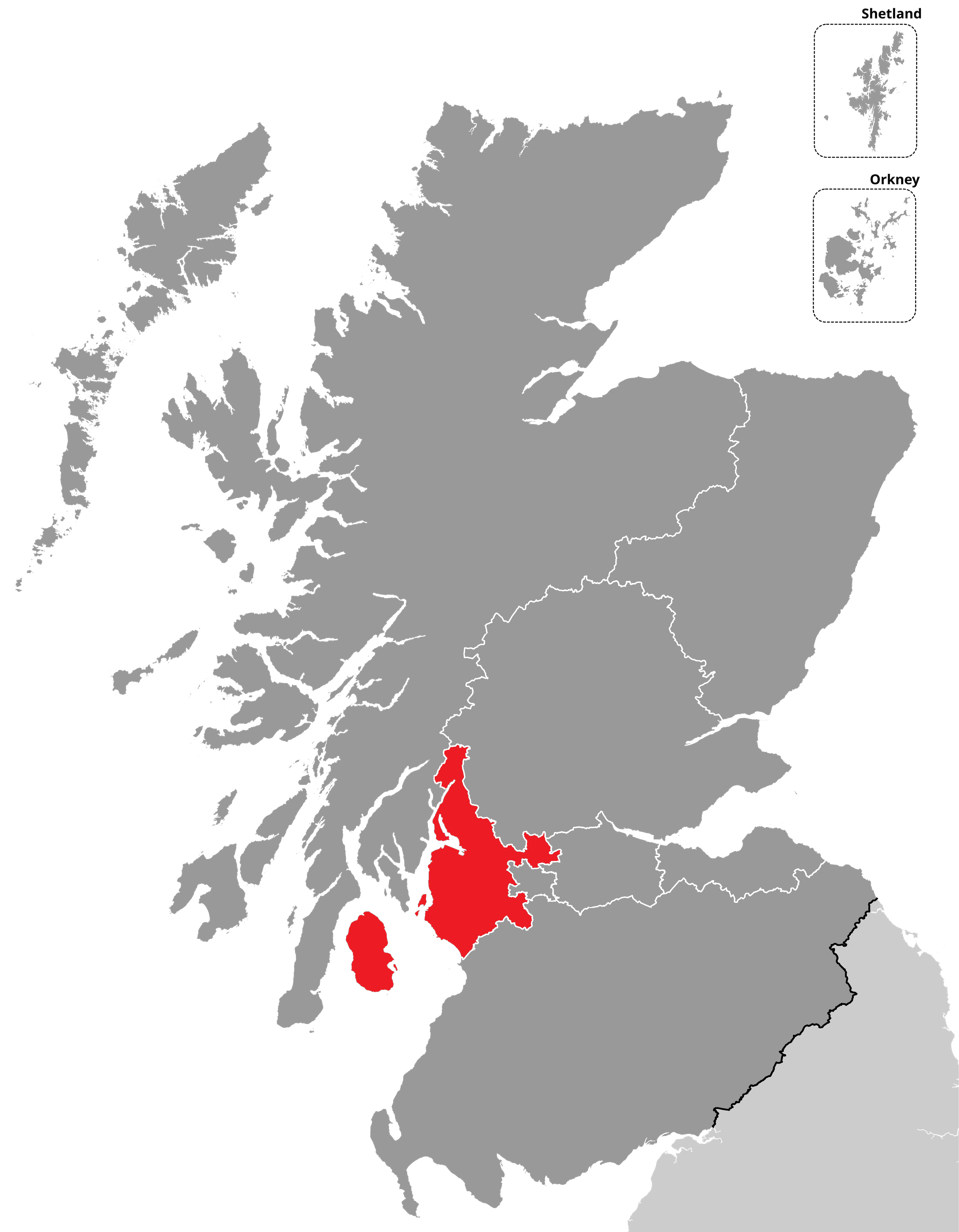
- Dumbarton shown within the West Scotland electoral region and the region shown within Scotland
- Electoral region: West Scotland
- Electorate: 56,335 (2026)

Current constituency
- Created: 1999
- Party: Labour
- MSP: Jackie Baillie
- Council area: West Dunbartonshire; Argyll and Bute

Dumbarton (Gaelic: Dùn Breatann) is a county constituency of the Scottish Parliament covering parts of the council areas of Argyll and Bute and West Dunbartonshire. Under the additional-member electoral system used for elections to the Scottish Parliament, it elects one Member of the Scottish Parliament (MSP) by the first past the post method of election. It is also one of ten constituencies in the West Scotland electoral region, which elects seven additional members, in addition to the ten constituency MSPs, to produce a form of proportional representation for the region as a whole.

The seat has been held continuously by Jackie Baillie of Scottish Labour since being first contested at the first election to the Scottish Parliament in 1999. She and John Swinney are the only two constituency MSPs elected in 1999 who remain in post as of 2026.

== Electoral region ==
The other nine constituencies of the West Scotland region are: Cunninghame North, Cunninghame South, Clydebank and Milngavie, Eastwood, Inverclyde, Paisley, Renfrewshire North and Cardonald, Renfrewshire West and Levern Valley, and Strathkelvin and Bearsden. The region covers the whole of the council areas of East Dunbartonshire, East Renfrewshire, Inverclyde, North Ayrshire, Renfrewshire, and West Dunbartonshire; and parts of the council areas of Argyll and Bute, East Ayrshire, and Glasgow.

== Constituency boundaries and council area ==
Map of boundaries from 2011

The Dumbarton constituency takes in Helensburgh and Lomond from the Argyll and Bute council area and covers Dumbarton and the Vale of Leven in West Dunbartonshire. The rest of West Dunbartonshire is covered by the Clydebank and Milngavie. The rest of Argyll and Bute is covered by the Argyll and Bute constituency, which is within the Highlands and Islands electoral region.

The Dumbarton constituency was created at the same time as the Scottish Parliament, in 1999, with the name and boundaries of the existing Dumbarton constituency of the UK Parliament. Ahead of the 2005 United Kingdom general election the House of Commons constituencies in Scotland were altered, whilst the existing Scottish Parliament constituencies were retained. There is now longer any link between the two sets of boundaries. The constituency boundaries were reviewed and altered ahead of the 2011 Scottish Parliament election. In 2025, ahead of the 2026 Scottish Parliament election, a further review was undertaken: a very minor boundary change was made in the Old Kilpatrick area where the constituency borders the Clydebank and Milngavie constituency in order to align constituency and ward boundaries.

The electoral wards of Argyll and Bute Council and West Dunbartonshire Council used in the current creation of Dumbarton are:

- Argyll and Bute:
  - Lomond North
  - Helensburgh Central
  - Helensburgh and Lomond South
- West Dunbartonshire
  - Dumbarton
  - Leven
  - Lomond

== Constituency profile ==
Dumbarton is the only constituency in the Scottish Parliament to have voted Labour in every election in the devolved era. Ahead of the 2021 election, The Times profiled the seat:

Dumbarton is a diverse seat split between two local authorities: Argyll and Bute and West Dunbartonshire. Its two biggest towns, Dumbarton and Helensburgh, have very different demographics. Dumbarton has significant unemployment and deprivation. It is a traditional Labour territory but, as with many such heartlands, the party’s one-time supporters have become increasingly disaffected... Helensburgh, with its pretty, blustery waterfront, is more affluent and has benefited from its proximity to Faslane naval base.

== Member of the Scottish Parliament ==
| Election | Member | Party |
|---|---|---|
| 1999 | Jackie Baillie | Labour |

== Election results ==

=== 2020s ===
2026 Scottish Parliament election: Dumbarton
| Party | Candidate | Constituency | | | Regional | | |
| Party | Candidate | Votes | % | ±% | Votes | % | ±% |
|---|---|---|---|---|---|---|---|
| Labour | Jackie Baillie (Note: Incumbent member for this constituency) | 12,747 | 39.8 | ▼6.5 | 7,615 | 23.8 | ▼2.8 |
| SNP | Sophie Traynor | 10,961 | 34.2 | ▼8.3 | 8,360 | 26.1 | ▼12.3 |
| Reform | David Smith (Note: Elected on the party list) | 5,040 | 15.7 | New | 5,983 | 18.7 | ▲18.6 |
| Green | | | | | 3,820 | 11.9 | ▲5.6 |
| Conservative | Gary Mulvaney | 1,368 | 4.3 | ▼4.0 | 2,810 | 8.8 | ▼12.3 |
| Liberal Democrats | Elaine Ford | 1,196 | 3.7 | ▲1.9 | 1,633 | 5.1 | ▲2.5 |
| TUSC | Lynda McEwan | 356 | 1.1 | New | | | |
| Independent | Andrew Muir | 355 | 1.1 | New | | | |
| Socialist Labour | | | | | 298 | 0.9 | New |
| AtLS | | | | | 233 | 0.7 | New |
| Independent Green Voice | | | | | 223 | 0.7 | ▲0.2 |
| Scottish Family | | | | | 221 | 0.7 | ▲0.1 |
| Scottish Socialist | | | | | 209 | 0.7 | New |
| ISP | | | | | 181 | 0.6 | New |
| Liberal | | | | | 129 | 0.4 | New |
| Independent | William Wallace | | | | 97 | 0.3 | New |
| ADF | | | | | 61 | 0.2 | New |
| UKIP | | | | | 58 | 0.2 | Steady |
| Scottish Libertarian | | | | | 47 | 0.1 | Steady |
| Independent | Paddy McCarthy | | | | 40 | 0.1 | New |
| Scottish Common Party | | | | | 32 | 0.1 | New |
| Independent | Paul Mack | | | | 12 | 0.0 | New |
| Majority | | 1,786 | 5.6 | ▲1.7 | | | |
| Valid votes | | 32,023 | | | 32,060 | | |
| Invalid votes | | 91 | | | 82 | | |
| Turnout | | 32,114 | 57.0 | ▼11.5 | 32,142 | 57.1 | ▼11.4 |
| Labour hold | | Swing | | ▲0.9 | | | |
Notes

2021 Scottish Parliament election: Dumbarton
| Party | Candidate | Constituency | | | Regional | | |
| Party | Candidate | Votes | % | ±% | Votes | % | ±% |
|---|---|---|---|---|---|---|---|
| Labour | Jackie Baillie (Note: Incumbent member for this constituency) | 17,825 | 46.3 | ▲6.1 | 10,228 | 26.6 | ▲1.5 |
| SNP | Toni Giugliano | 16,342 | 42.5 | ▲2.6 | 14,766 | 38.4 | ▼0.5 |
| Conservative | Maurice Corry (Note: Incumbent member on the party list, or for another constituency) | 3,205 | 8.3 | ▼6.3 | 8,110 | 21.1 | ▼2.1 |
| Green | | | | | 2,444 | 6.4 | ▲1.3 |
| Liberal Democrats | Andy Foxall | 676 | 1.8 | ▼1.6 | 986 | 2.6 | ▼1.2 |
| Alba | | | | | 727 | 1.9 | New |
| All for Unity | | | | | 291 | 0.8 | New |
| Scottish Family | | | | | 211 | 0.5 | New |
| Independent Green Voice | | | | | 192 | 0.5 | New |
| Abolish the Scottish Parliament | | | | | 90 | 0.2 | New |
| Scottish Libertarian | Jonathan Rainey | 134 | 0.3 | New | 73 | 0.2 | 0.0 |
| Freedom Alliance (UK) | | | | | 70 | 0.2 | New |
| TUSC | | | | | 73 | 0.2 | New |
| Reform | | | | | 57 | 0.1 | New |
| Independent | James Morrison | | | | 65 | 0.2 | New |
| UKIP | | | | | 48 | 0.1 | ▼1.9 |
| Independent | Maurice Campbell | | | | 27 | 0.1 | New |
| Scotia Future | | | | | 16 | 0.0 | New |
| Renew | | | | | 4 | 0.0 | New |
| Independent | James Morrison | 183 | 0.5 | New | | | |
| Independent | Andrew Muir | 94 | 0.2 | ▼1.7 | | | |
| Majority | | 1,483 | 3.8 | ▲3.5 | | | |
| Valid votes | | 38,459 | | | 38,478 | | |
| Invalid votes | | 106 | | | 58 | | |
| Turnout | | 38,565 | 68.5 | ▲7.4 | 38,536 | 68.5 | ▲7.3 |
| Labour hold | | Swing | | ▲1.8 | | | |

=== 2010s ===
2016 Scottish Parliament election: Dumbarton
| Party | Candidate | Constituency | | | Region | | |
| Party | Candidate | Votes | % | ±% | Votes | % | ±% |
|---|---|---|---|---|---|---|---|
| Labour | Jackie Baillie (Note: Incumbent member for this constituency) | 13,522 | 40.2 | ▼3.8 | 8,433 | 25.1 | ▼8.3 |
| SNP | Gail Robertson | 13,413 | 39.9 | ▲1.6 | 13,059 | 38.8 | ▼0.4 |
| Conservative | Maurice Corry | 4,891 | 14.6 | ▲2.6 | 7,779 | 23.1 | ▲10.3 |
| Green | | | | | 1,683 | 5.0 | ▲2.3 |
| Liberal Democrats | Aileen Morton | 1,131 | 3.4 | ▲0.4 | 1,265 | 3.8 | ▲0.4 |
| Independent | Andrew Muir | 641 | 1.9 | New | | | |
| UKIP | | | | | 665 | 2.0 | ▲0.9 |
| Solidarity | | | | | 263 | 0.8 | ▼0.3 |
| Scottish Christian | | | | | 212 | 0.6 | ▼0.1 |
| RISE | | | | | 186 | 0.6 | New |
| Scottish Libertarian | | | | | 69 | 0.2 | New |
| Majority | | 109 | 0.3 | ▼5.5 | | | |
| Valid votes | | 33,598 | | | 33,614 | | |
| Invalid votes | | 100 | | | 75 | | |
| Turnout | | 33,698 | 61.2 | ▲7.6 | 33,689 | 61.1 | ▲7.6 |
| Labour hold | | Swing | | ▼2.75 | | | |
Notes

2011 Scottish Parliament election: Dumbarton
| Party | Candidate | Constituency | | | Region | | |
| Party | Candidate | Votes | % | ±% | Votes | % | ±% |
|---|---|---|---|---|---|---|---|
| Labour | Jackie Baillie (Note: Incumbent member for this constituency) | 12,562 | 44.1 | N/A | 9,531 | 33.4 | N/A |
| SNP | Iain Robertson | 10,923 | 38.3 | N/A | 11,178 | 39.2 | N/A |
| Conservative | Graham Smith | 3,395 | 11.9 | N/A | 3,668 | 12.9 | N/A |
| Liberal Democrats | Helen Watt | 858 | 3.0 | N/A | 948 | 3.3 | N/A |
| Independent | George Rice | 770 | 2.7 | N/A | | | |
| Green | | | | | 786 | 2.8 | N/A |
| All-Scotland Pensioners Party | | | | | 507 | 1.8 | N/A |
| Scottish Socialist | | | | | 506 | 1.8 | N/A |
| UKIP | | | | | 301 | 1.1 | N/A |
| Socialist Labour | | | | | 254 | 0.9 | N/A |
| BNP | | | | | 254 | 0.9 | N/A |
| Scottish Christian | | | | | 212 | 0.7 | N/A |
| Ban Bankers Bonuses | | | | | 147 | 0.5 | N/A |
| Pirate | | | | | 97 | 0.3 | N/A |
| Independent | Richard Vassie | | | | 69 | 0.2 | N/A |
| Solidarity | | | | | 54 | 0.2 | N/A |
| Majority | | 1,639 | 5.8 | N/A | | | |
| Valid votes | | 28,508 | | | 28,512 | | |
| Invalid votes | | 114 | | | 90 | | |
| Turnout | | 28,622 | 53.5 | N/A | 28,602 | 53.5 | N/A |
| Labour win (new boundaries) | | | | | | | |

=== 2000s ===
2007 Scottish Parliament election: Dumbarton
| Party | Candidate | Votes | % | ±% |
|---|---|---|---|---|
| Labour | Jackie Baillie | 11,635 | 38.7 | −3.5 |
| SNP | Graeme McCormick | 10,024 | 33.4 | +14.2 |
| Conservative | Brian Pope | 4,701 | 15.6 | +1.1 |
| Liberal Democrats | Alex Mackie | 3,385 | 11.3 | −4.2 |
| Scottish Jacobite | John Black | 309 | 1.0 | New |
| Majority | | 1,611 | 5.3 | −17.7 |
| Turnout | | 30,054 | 55.6 | +3.7 |
| Labour hold | | Swing | | |

2003 Scottish Parliament election: Dumbarton
| Party | Candidate | Votes | % | ±% |
|---|---|---|---|---|
| Labour | Jackie Baillie | 12,154 | 42.2 | −1.6 |
| SNP | Iain Docherty | 5,542 | 19.2 | −10.8 |
| Liberal Democrats | Eric Thompson | 4,455 | 15.5 | +3.9 |
| Conservative | Murray Tosh | 4,178 | 14.5 | −0.1 |
| Scottish Socialist | Les Robertson | 2,494 | 8.7 | New |
| Majority | | 6,612 | 23.0 | +9.2 |
| Turnout | | 28,823, | 51.9 | −10.0 |
| Labour hold | | Swing | | |

=== 1990s ===
1999 Scottish Parliament election: Dumbarton
| Party | Candidate | Votes | % | ±% |
|---|---|---|---|---|
| Labour | Jackie Baillie | 15,181 | 43.8 | N/A |
| SNP | Lloyd Quinan | 10,423 | 30.0 | N/A |
| Conservative | Donald Reece | 5,060 | 14.6 | N/A |
| Liberal Democrats | Paul Coleshill | 4,035 | 11.6 | N/A |
| Majority | | 4,758 | 13.8 | N/A |
| Turnout | | 34,699 | 61.9 | N/A |
| Labour win (new seat) | | | | |
