= United Kingdom constituencies =

Various types of electoral area in the UK

There are 650 constituencies for the UK House of Commons.

In the United Kingdom (UK), there are various electoral areas or divisions called constituencies. The House of Commons of the Parliament of the United Kingdom has constituencies across the UK, while the devolved parliaments and assemblies in Scotland, Wales, Northern Ireland and London also have their own constituencies.

The five bodies with members elected by electoral districts called "constituencies" (as opposed to "wards") are:

- The House of Commons (see Constituencies of the Parliament of the United Kingdom)
- The Scottish Parliament (see Scottish Parliament constituencies and electoral regions)
- The Senedd (see Senedd constituencies)
- The Northern Ireland Assembly (see Northern Ireland Assembly constituencies)
- The London Assembly (see London Assembly constituencies)

Between 1921 and 1973 the following body also included members elected by constituencies:

- The Parliament of Northern Ireland (see Northern Ireland Parliament constituencies)

Electoral areas called constituencies were previously used in elections to the European Parliament, prior to the United Kingdom's exit from the European Union (see European Parliament constituency).

In local government elections (other than for the London Assembly) electoral areas are called wards or electoral divisions.

== County constituencies and borough constituencies ==
House of Commons, Scottish Parliament, Senedd and Northern Ireland Assembly constituencies are designated as either county or borough constituencies, except that in Scotland the term burgh is used instead of borough. Since the advent of universal suffrage, the differences between county and borough constituencies are slight. Formerly (see below) the franchise differed, and there were also county borough and university constituencies.

Borough constituencies are predominantly urban while county constituencies are predominantly rural. There is no definitive statutory criterion for the distinction; the Boundary Commission for England has stated that, "as a general principle, where constituencies contain more than a small rural element they should normally be designated as county constituencies. Otherwise they should be designated as borough constituencies." In Scotland, all House of Commons constituencies are county constituencies except those in the cities of Glasgow, Edinburgh, Aberdeen, Dundee and three urban areas of Lanarkshire.

In England and Wales, the position of returning officer in borough constituencies is held ex officio by the mayor or chairman of the borough or district council, and the high sheriff of the county in county constituencies. The administration of elections is carried out by the acting returning officer, who will typically be a local council's chief executive or Head of Legal Services. The role, however, is separate from these posts, and can be held by any person appointed by the council. The spending limits for election campaigns are different in the two, the reasoning being that candidates in county constituencies tend to need to travel farther.

Spending limits for election campaigns
Elected body	Constituency type	
Elected body	borough/burgh	county
House of Commons	£11,390 + 8p per elector	£11,390 + 12p per elector
Northern Ireland Assembly	£5,483 + 4.6p per elector	£5,483 + 6.2p per elector
Scottish Parliament	£5,761 + 4.8p per elector	£5,761 + 6.5p per elector
Senedd	Party candidates / Spending limit; 1 / £52,500; 2 / £56,000; 3 / £59,500; 4 / £63,000; 5 / £66,500; 6, 7, 8 / £70,000	

For by-elections to any of these bodies, the limit in all constituencies is £100,000.

Elected position	Spending limit
Mayor of London	£760,410
Assembly member (constituency candidate)	£63,360
Assembly member (independent candidate to be additional member)	£597,460
Assembly member party list (Note: This includes spending on the whole party list, and any candidates on the party list and any general spending promoting the party in the GLA election)	£597,460

=== History ===
In the House of Commons of England, each English county elected two "knights of the shire" while each enfranchised borough elected "burgesses" (usually two, sometimes four, and in a few cases one). From 1535 each Welsh county and borough was represented, by one knight or burgess. The franchise was restricted differently in different types of constituency; in county constituencies forty shilling freeholders (i.e. landowners) could vote, while in boroughs the franchise varied from potwallopers, giving many residents votes, to rotten boroughs with hardly any voters. A county borough was the constituency of a county corporate, combining the franchises of both county and borough. Until 1950 there were also university constituencies, which gave graduates an additional representation.

Similar distinctions applied in the Irish House of Commons, while the non-university elected members of the Parliament of Scotland were called Shire Commissioners and Burgh Commissioners. After the Acts of Union 1707, Scottish burghs were grouped into districts of burghs in the Parliament of Great Britain, except that Edinburgh was a constituency in its own right. After the Acts of Union 1800, smaller Irish boroughs were disenfranchised, while most others returned only one MP to the United Kingdom Parliament.

The Reform Act 1832 reduced the number of parliamentary boroughs in England and Wales by eliminating the rotten boroughs. It also divided larger counties into two two-seat divisions, the boundaries of which were defined in the Parliamentary Boundaries Act 1832, and gave seven counties a third member. Similar reforms were also made for Scotland and for Ireland. The Redistribution of Seats Act 1885 (48 & 49 Vict. c. 23) equalised the population of constituencies; it split larger boroughs into multiple single-member constituencies, reduced smaller boroughs from two seats each to one, split each two-seat county and division into two single-member constituencies, and each three-seat county into single-member constituencies.

The House of Commons (Redistribution of Seats) Act 1958 eliminated the previous common electoral quota for the whole United Kingdom and replaced it with four separate national minimal seat quotas for the respective Boundaries commissions to work to. As a result the separate national electoral quotas came into effect: England 69,534; Northern Ireland 67,145, Wales 58,383 and in Scotland only 54,741 electors. This was partially reverted by the Scotland Act 1998 and Scottish Parliament (Constituencies) Act 2004, which aligned Scotland's electoral quota with that of England to account for the existence of a devolved Scottish Parliament.

== Naming ==
The Parliamentary Voting System and Constituencies Act 2011 gives the Boundary Commissions for England, Wales, Scotland and Northern Ireland the power to create names for constituencies, and does not provide a set of statutory guidelines for the Commissions to follow in doing so.

Constituency names are geographic, and "should normally reflect the main population centre(s) contained in the constituency". Compass points are used to distinguish constituencies from each other when a more suitable label cannot be found. Where used, "The compass point reference used will generally form a prefix in cases where the rest of the constituency name refers to the county area or a local council, but a suffix where the rest of the name refers to a population centre." This is the reason for the difference in naming between, for example, South Northamptonshire (a county constituency) and Northampton South (a borough constituency).

In recent decades, House of Commons constituency names have been noted for getting longer, many containing three toponyms and several cardinal directions. Whereas in 1950 constituencies had an average of 12.6 characters, by 2021 they had reached 15.7, with the longest being Cumbernauld, Kilsyth and Kirkintilloch East (38 letters, later shortened to 'Cumbernauld and Kirkintilloch'). In 1955 about half of English constituencies had one-word names, but this had fallen to less than a third by 2021, with some of the most unwieldy being "Birmingham Hodge Hill and Solihull North;" "Doncaster East and the Isle of Axholme;" "Lewisham West and East Dulwich;" and "Middlesbrough South and East Cleveland."

Scotland has 57 Westminster constituencies, but only four are single words, with lengthy examples being "Caithness, Sutherland and Easter Ross;" "Dumfriesshire, Clydesdale and Tweeddale;" and "Inverness, Skye and West Ross-shire."

A 2010 report by the British Academy noted that "The issue of a constituency's name can be very contentious, and in some cases has led the Commissions to recommend long names to reflect the range of separately-identified communities within a constituency, each of which wishes its identity to be marked in the name. With larger constituencies in the future, the pressure for such longer names may well increase."

== House of Commons constituencies ==
In the 2005 United Kingdom general election, the House of Commons had 646 constituencies covering the whole of the United Kingdom. This rose to 650 in the 2010 election following the Fifth Periodic Review of Westminster constituencies. Each constituency elects one Member of Parliament (MP) by the "first-past-the-post" system of election.

The House of Commons is one of the two chambers of the bicameral Parliament of the United Kingdom, the other being the House of Lords.

=== See also ===
- Boundary commissions (United Kingdom)
- Constituencies of the Parliament of the United Kingdom
- List of former United Kingdom Parliament constituencies
- University constituency
- Number of Westminster MPs
- List of United Kingdom Parliament constituencies (2024–present) by region

== London Assembly constituencies ==
There are fourteen London Assembly constituencies covering the Greater London area, and each constituency elects one member of the assembly by the first-past-the-post system. Eleven additional members are elected from Greater London as a whole to produce a form or degree of mixed-member proportional representation.

Constituency names and boundaries remain now as they were for the first general election of the assembly, in 2000.

The assembly is part of the Greater London Authority and general elections of the assembly are held at the same time as election of the mayor of London.

== Northern Ireland Assembly constituencies ==
There are 18 Northern Ireland Assembly Constituencies: four borough (for Belfast) and 14 county constituencies elsewhere (see below).

Each elects five MLAs to the 90 member NI Assembly by means of the single transferable vote system. Assembly Constituency boundaries are identical to their House of Commons equivalents.

The constituencies below are not used for the election of members to the 11 district councils.

Name
1. Belfast East BC
2. Belfast North BC
3. Belfast South BC
4. Belfast West BC
5. East Antrim CC
6. East Londonderry CC
7. Fermanagh & South Tyrone CC
8. Foyle CC
9. Lagan Valley CC
Boundaries from 1998 to 2011

Parliamentary constituencies in Northern Ireland

Name
10. Mid Ulster CC
11. Newry & Armagh CC
12. North Antrim CC
13. North Down CC
14. South Antrim CC
15. South Down CC
16. Strangford CC
17. Upper Bann CC
18. West Tyrone CC

== Scottish Parliament constituencies ==
Scottish Parliament constituencies are sometimes called Holyrood constituencies, the Scottish Parliament Building being situated in the Holyrood area of Edinburgh, to distinguish them from the Westminster constituencies of the Parliament of the United Kingdom, in the Palace of Westminster in the City of Westminster.

There are 73 Holyrood constituencies covering Scotland, and each elects one Member of the Scottish Parliament (MSP) by the first-past-the-post system. Also, the constituencies are grouped into eight electoral regions, and each of these regions elects seven additional members, to produce a form or degree of mixed-member proportional representation.

The existing constituencies were created, effectively, for the first general election of the Scottish Parliament, in 1999. When created, all but two had the names and boundaries of Westminster constituencies. The two exceptions were the Orkney Holyrood constituency, covering the Orkney Islands council area, and the Shetland Holyrood constituency, covering the Shetland Islands council area. For Westminster elections, these council areas were covered (and still are covered) by the Orkney and Shetland Westminster constituency.

In 1999, under the Scotland Act 1998, the expectation was that there would be a permanent link between the boundaries of Holyrood constituencies and those of Westminster constituencies. This link was broken, however, by the Scottish Parliament (Constituencies) Act 2004, which enabled the creation of a new set of Westminster constituencies without change to Holyrood constituencies. The new Westminster boundaries became effective for the 2005 United Kingdom general election.

== Senedd constituencies ==
There are 16 Senedd constituencies covering Wales, and each elects six Members of the Senedd (MS) by the D'Hondt method.

The current set of Senedd constituencies is the third to be created. The first was created for the first general election of the National Assembly for Wales, in 1999.

== European Parliament constituencies ==
Before its withdrawal from the European Union in 2020, the United Kingdom elected its Members of the European Parliament (MEPs) through twelve multimember European Parliament constituencies. One, Northern Ireland, used single transferable vote, while the eleven covering Great Britain used the d'Hondt method of party-list proportional representation.

For its first European Parliamentary elections in 1979 Great Britain was divided into a number of single-member first-past-the-post constituencies, matching the way Westminster MPs are elected. Following the decision that all MEPs should be elected by some form of proportional representation, the Labour government passed the European Parliamentary Elections Act 1999, creating eleven constituencies in Great Britain, which were first used in 1999.

The South West England constituency was expanded from the 2004 elections onward to include Gibraltar, the only British overseas territory that was part of the European Union, following a court case.
