= East Renfrewshire Council elections =

Local government elections in East Renfrewshire, Scotland

East Renfrewshire Council in Scotland holds elections every five years, previously holding them every four years from its creation as a single-tier authority in 1995 to 2007.

== Council elections ==
Year	SNP	Conservative	Labour	Liberal Democrats	Residents Association	Independent
1995	0	9	8	2	1	0
1999 (Note: New ward boundaries.)	0	8	9	2	0	1
2003	0	7	8	3	0	2
2007 (Note: Change to single transferable vote system and new ward boundaries.)	3	7	7	1	0	2
2012	4	6	8	0	0	2
2017 (Note: New ward boundaries.)	5	7	4	0	0	2
2022	6	5	5	0	0	2

== Results maps ==
2003 results map

2007 results map

2012 results map

2017 results map

2022 results map

== By-elections ==
=== 2022-2027 ===
Barrhead, Liboside and Uplawmoor By-Election 21 August 2025
Party	Candidate	FPv%	Count					
Party	Candidate	FPv%	1	2	3	4	5	6
Labour	Julie Costello McHale	41.9	1,901	1,906	1,970	2,029	2,217	2,866
SNP	David McDonald	25.1	1,142	1,142	1,151	1,292	1,431	
Reform	Andy MacGibbon	22.4	1,018	1,022	1,076	1,089		
Green	Karen Sharkey	5.4	247	252	266			
Conservative	Farooq Choudury	4.6	207	211				
Abolish the Scottish Parliament	Gus Ferguson	0.6	27					
Labour hold								
Valid: 4,542 Spoilt: 43 Quota: 2,272 Turnout: 4,585
