= Busby, Clarkston and Eaglesham (ward) =

Former electoral ward in East Renfrewshire, Scotland

Busby, Clarkston and Eaglesham was one of six multi-member wards used to elect members of the East Renfrewshire Council between 2007 and 2017. It elected three Councillors.

As its name implies, the ward covered the suburban village of Busby and much of the suburban town of Clarkston (including the Carolside and Sheddens neighbourhoods) plus the village of Eaglesham, surrounded by an extensive rural hinterland including part of the developing Whitelee Wind Farm and the affluent hamlet of Waterfoot.

Prior to the 2017 Scottish local elections, arrangements across the country were subject to review, which concluded that East Renfrewshire's wards should be redrawn and the total number of representatives reduced from 20 to 18. Busby, Clarkston and Eaglesham was the ward which ceased to exist in this amendment, its territory divided between the Clarkston, Netherlee and Williamwood ward and the Newton Mearns South & Eaglesham ward.

== Councillors ==
Election	Councillors		
2007	Alan Lafferty (Labour)	Alistair Carmichael (SNP)	Stewart Miller (Conservative)
2012	Alan Lafferty (Labour)	Alistair Carmichael (SNP)	Stewart Miller (Conservative)

== Election results ==
=== 2012 ===
Busby, Clarkston and Eaglesham - 3 seats
Party	Candidate	FPv%	Count		
Party	Candidate	FPv%	1	2	3
Labour	Alan Lafferty (incumbent)	32.69	1,763		
SNP	Alastair Carmichael (incumbent)	21.60	1,165	1,275	1,336
Conservative	Stewart Miller (incumbent)	22.68	1,223	1,260	1,301
Conservative	Alec White	16.30	879	890	900
Independent	George Kennedy	3.95	213	278	323
Liberal Democrats	Ritchie Adam	2.78	150	208	
Quota: {{{quota}}}

=== 2007 ===
Busby, Clarkston and Eaglesham
Party	Candidate	FPv%	Count				
Party	Candidate	FPv%	1	2	3	4	5
Labour	Alan Lafferty	28.1	1,970				
Conservative	Stewart Miller	22.4	1,571	1,592.37	1,773.62		
Conservative	Alec White	18.6	1,302	1,310.70	1,516.43	1,531.22	
SNP	Alistair Carmichael	16.8	1,177	1,220.51	1,537.11	1,539.04	2,014.86
Liberal Democrats	George Napier	14.1	991	1,061.28			
Electorate: - Valid: 7,011 Spoilt: 89 Quota: 1,753
