= Eastwood (Scottish Parliament constituency) =

Scottish Parliament constituency

- County constituency for the Scottish Parliament
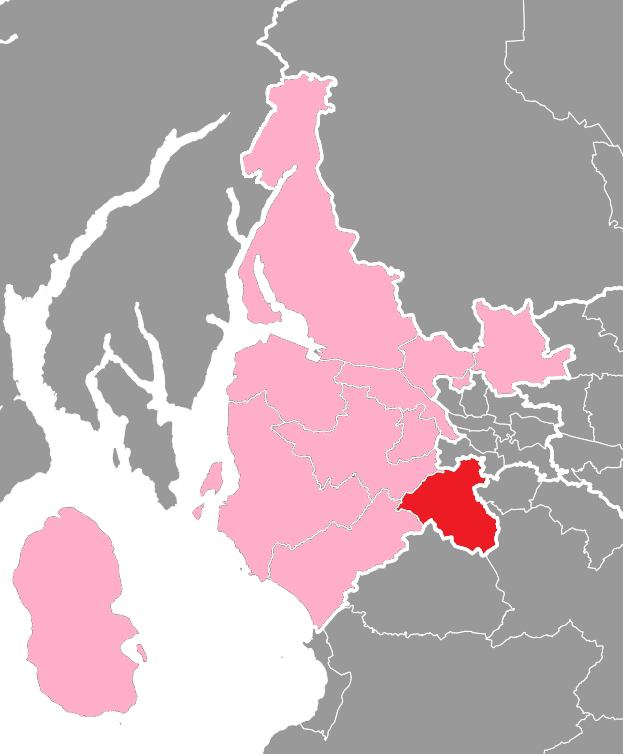

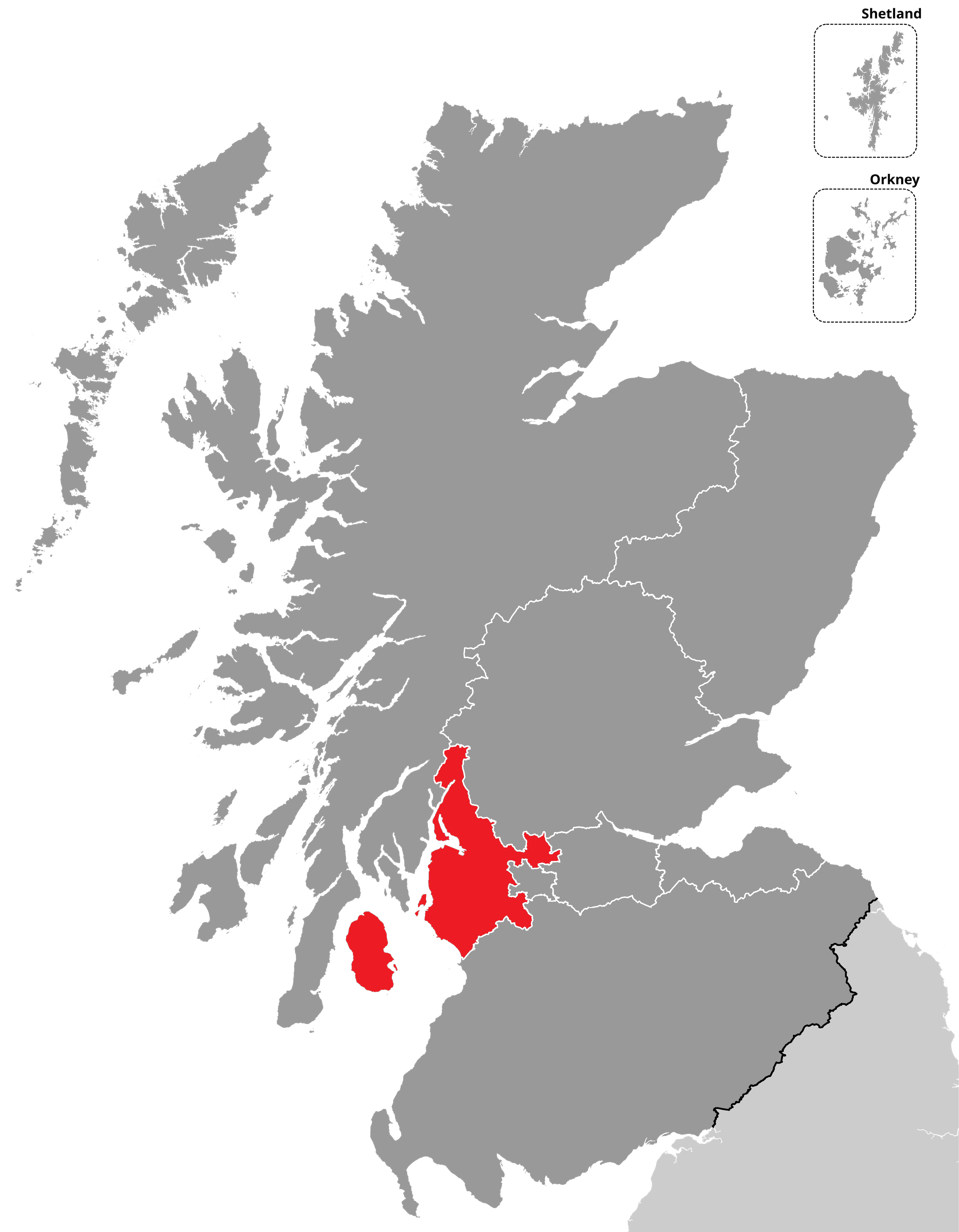
- Eastwood shown within the West Scotland electoral region and the region shown within Scotland
- Electoral region: West Scotland
- Electorate: 58,363 (2026)

Current constituency
- Created: 1999
- Party: Scottish National Party
- MSP: Kirsten Oswald
- Council area: East Renfrewshire

Eastwood (Gaelic: A' Choille Shear) is a county constituency of the Scottish Parliament covering part of the council area of East Renfrewshire. Under the additional-member electoral system used for elections to the Scottish Parliament, it elects one Member of the Scottish Parliament (MSP) by the first past the post method of election. It is also one of ten constituencies in the West Scotland electoral region, which elects seven additional members, in addition to the ten constituency MSPs, to produce a form of proportional representation for the region as a whole.

The seat is held by Kirsten Oswald of the SNP, who took it in 2026 from Jackson Carlaw of the Scottish Conservatives, who had held it since the 2016 Scottish Parliament election.

== Electoral region ==
The other nine constituencies of the West Scotland region are: Cunninghame North, Cunninghame South, Clydebank and Milngavie, Dumbarton, Inverclyde, Paisley, Renfrewshire North and Cardonald, Renfrewshire West and Levern Valley, and Strathkelvin and Bearsden. The region covers the whole of the council areas of East Dunbartonshire, East Renfrewshire, Inverclyde, North Ayrshire, Renfrewshire, and West Dunbartonshire; and parts of the council areas of Argyll and Bute, East Ayrshire, and Glasgow.

== Constituency boundaries and council area ==
Map of boundaries from 2011

Eastwood is one of two constituencies covering the council area of East Renfrewshire; it covers the majority of this council area. The westernmost part of East Renfrewshire, comprising the villages of Barrhead, Neilston and Uplawmoor in the valley of the Levern Water forms part of the Renfrewshire West and Levern Valley constituency, which predominantly covers parts of the Renfrewshire council area.

An Eastwood constituency was created at the same time as the Scottish Parliament, in 1999, with the name and boundaries of the existing Eastwood constituency of the UK Parliament. Ahead of the 2005 United Kingdom general election the House of Commons constituencies in Scotland were altered, whilst the existing Scottish Parliament constituencies were retained: the entirety of East Renfrewshire now forms the East Renfrewshire constituency for UK elections.

In boundary changes in time for the 2011 Scottish Parliament election, the constituency of Eastwood was redrawn. The 2011 boundaries were retained by the Second Periodic Review of Scottish Parliament Boundaries in 2025. The electoral wards of East Renfrewshire Council used in the current creation of Eastwood are:

- In full:
  - Giffnock and Thornliebank
  - Clarkston, Netherlee and Williamwood
  - Newton Mearns South and Eaglesham
- In part:
  - Newton Mearns North and Neilston (shared with Renfrewshire West and Levern Valley)

== Constituency profile ==
The Eastwood constituency is a highly affluent, middle-class commuter seat located south-west of Glasgow. It covers a majority of the East Renfrewshire council area, based principally around the towns of Newton Mearns, Eaglesham, Giffnock, Thornliebank, Netherlee, Busby and Clarkston which adjoin the City of Glasgow. According to data derived from the Scottish Index for Multiple Deprivation 60% of the seat's datazones are among the 10% most affluent areas in Scotland, with a further 15% of the seat's datazones being among the 20% most affluent areas in Scotland.

Data from the 2011 Scottish Census suggests that the seat has a substantial number of home-owners residing in large bungalows in comparison to the national average, with large portion of the seat's working population being employed in managerial, administrative and professional occupations.

== Member of the Scottish Parliament ==
The MSP for this constituency from its creation in 1999 was Ken Macintosh of Labour. In the 2016 election, Macintosh lost the seat, finishing third behind the Conservative victor Jackson Carlaw; however, he was returned as an additional MSP for the West Scotland region, following which he was elected as the Scottish Parliament's fifth Presiding Officer. Kirsten Oswald, former MP for East Renfrewshire was elected for the seat in 2026. This was the first time the constituency was held by the Scottish National Party.

| Election | Member | Party |
|---|---|---|
| 1999 | Ken Macintosh | Labour |
| 2016 | Jackson Carlaw | Conservative |
| 2026 | Kirsten Oswald | Scottish National Party |

== Election results ==
=== 2020s ===
2026 Scottish Parliament election: Eastwood
| Party | Candidate | Constituency | | | Regional | | |
| Party | Candidate | Votes | % | ±% | Votes | % | ±% |
|---|---|---|---|---|---|---|---|
| SNP | Kirsten Oswald | 12,722 | 33.2 | ▼3.6 | 8,056 | 20.9 | ▼8.1 |
| Conservative | Jackson Carlaw (Note: Incumbent member for this constituency) | 11,990 | 31.3 | ▼10.6 | 8,568 | 22.3 | ▼13.6 |
| Labour | Kayleigh Quinn | 8,368 | 21.9 | ▲6.1 | 8,360 | 21.7 | ▲2.0 |
| Green | | | | | 5,179 | 13.5 | ▲5.3 |
| Reform | John Mooney | 3,453 | 9.0 | New | 4,810 | 12.5 | New |
| Liberal Democrats | Euan Davidson | 1,748 | 4.6 | ▲2.5 | 2,009 | 5.2 | ▲2.1 |
| Scottish Family | | | | | 365 | 0.9 | ▲0.2 |
| Independent Green Voice | | | | | 278 | 0.7 | New |
| Socialist Labour | | | | | 160 | 0.4 | New |
| AtLS | | | | | 157 | 0.4 | New |
| ISP | | | | | 121 | 0.3 | New |
| Liberal | | | | | 120 | 0.3 | New |
| Scottish Socialist | | | | | 73 | 0.2 | New |
| Independent | William Wallace | | | | 64 | 0.2 | New |
| Scottish Common Party | | | | | 62 | 0.2 | New |
| ADF | | | | | 34 | 0.1 | New |
| Independent | Paddy McCarthy | | | | 30 | 0.1 | New |
| UKIP | | | | | 21 | 0.1 | Steady |
| Independent | Paul Mack | | | | 16 | 0.04 | New |
| Scottish Libertarian | | | | | 16 | 0.04 | ▼0.05 |
| Majority | | 732 | 1.9 | ▼3.3 | | | |
| Valid votes | | 38,281 | | | 38,499 | | |
| Invalid votes | | 214 | | | 111 | | |
| Turnout | | 38,495 | 65.9 | ▼10.5 | 38,610 | 66.2 | ▼10.4 |
| SNP gain from Conservative | | Swing | | ▲3.5 | | | |
Notes

2021 Scottish Parliament election: Eastwood
| Party | Candidate | Constituency | | | Regional | | |
| Party | Candidate | Votes | % | ±% | Votes | % | ±% |
|---|---|---|---|---|---|---|---|
| Conservative | Jackson Carlaw (Note: Incumbent member for this constituency) | 17,911 | 41.9 | ▲6.2 | 15,369 | 35.9 | ▼2.5 |
| SNP | Colm Merrick | 15,695 | 36.8 | ▲5.6 | 12,433 | 29.0 | ▼0.4 |
| Labour | Katie Pragnell | 6,759 | 15.8 | ▼14.8 | 8,449 | 19.7 | ▼0.3 |
| Green | | | | | 3,524 | 8.2 | ▲1.6 |
| Independent | David Macdonald | 1,352 | 3.2 | New | | | |
| Liberal Democrats | Tahir Jameel | 911 | 2.1 | ▼0.4 | 1,243 | 2.9 | ▲0.2 |
| Alba | | | | | 502 | 1.2 | New |
| All for Unity | | | | | 354 | 0.8 | New |
| Scottish Family | | | | | 307 | 0.7 | New |
| Independent Green Voice | | | | | 232 | 0.5 | New |
| Abolish the Scottish Parliament | | | | | 91 | 0.2 | New |
| Freedom Alliance (UK) | | | | | 71 | 0.2 | New |
| Reform | | | | | 64 | 0.1 | New |
| Independent | James Morrison | | | | 43 | 0.1 | New |
| Scottish Libertarian | | | | | 42 | 0.1 | ▼0.1 |
| UKIP | Janice MacKay | 75 | 0.2 | New | 41 | 0.1 | ▼1.2 |
| Independent | Maurice Campbell | | | | 27 | 0.1 | New |
| TUSC | | | | | 26 | 0.1 | New |
| Scotia Future | | | | | 12 | 0.0 | New |
| Renew | | | | | 10 | 0.0 | New |
| Majority | | 2,216 | 5.1 | ▲0.6 | | | |
| Valid votes | | 42,703 | | | 42,840 | | |
| Invalid votes | | 141 | | | 85 | | |
| Turnout | | 42,844 | 76.4 | ▲7.9 | 42,925 | 76.6 | ▲8.0 |
| Conservative hold | | Swing | | ▲0.8 | | | |
Notes

This was the smallest Conservative majority at the 2021 Scottish Parliament election.

=== 2010s ===
2016 Scottish Parliament election: Eastwood
| Party | Candidate | Constituency | | | Region | | |
| Party | Candidate | Votes | % | ±% | Votes | % | ±% |
|---|---|---|---|---|---|---|---|
| Conservative | Jackson Carlaw (Note: Incumbent member on the party list, or for another constituency) | 12,932 | 35.7 | ▲2.3 | 13,929 | 38.3 | ▲11.4 |
| SNP | Stewart Maxwell | 11,322 | 31.2 | ▲6.9 | 10,680 | 29.4 | ▼5.0 |
| Labour | Ken Macintosh (Note: Incumbent member for this constituency) | 11,081 | 30.6 | ▼9.1 | 7,263 | 20.0 | ▼7.3 |
| Green | | | | | 2,390 | 6.6 | ▲2.9 |
| Liberal Democrats | John Duncan | 921 | 2.5 | ▼0.1 | 999 | 2.7 | ▼0.1 |
| UKIP | | | | | 458 | 1.3 | ▲0.7 |
| Scottish Christian | | | | | 286 | 0.1 | ▲0.1 |
| Solidarity | | | | | 135 | 0.4 | ▲0.2 |
| RISE | | | | | 129 | 0.4 | New |
| Scottish Libertarian | | | | | 60 | 0.2 | New |
| Majority | | 1,610 | 4.5 | N/A | | | |
| Valid votes | | 36,256 | | | 36,329 | | |
| Invalid votes | | 116 | | | 58 | | |
| Turnout | | 36,372 | 68.5 | ▲5.1 | 36,387 | 68.5 | ▲5.2 |
| Conservative gain from Labour | | Swing | | | | | |
Notes

2011 Scottish Parliament election: Eastwood
| Party | Candidate | Constituency | | | Region | | |
| Party | Candidate | Votes | % | ±% | Votes | % | ±% |
|---|---|---|---|---|---|---|---|
| Labour | Ken Macintosh (Note: Incumbent member for this constituency) | 12,662 | 39.7 | +9.8 | 8,708 | 27.3 | N/A |
| Conservative | Jackson Carlaw (Note: Incumbent member on the party list, or for another constituency) | 10,650 | 33.4 | -8.3 | 8,584 | 26.9 | N/A |
| SNP | Stewart Maxwell | 7,777 | 24.3 | +8.6 | 10,967 | 34.4 | N/A |
| Green | | | | | 1,170 | 3.7 | N/A |
| Liberal Democrats | Gordon Cochrane | 835 | 2.6 | ' -8.5 | 906 | 2.8 | N/A |
| All-Scotland Pensioners Party | | | | | 365 | 1.1 | N/A |
| Scottish Christian | | | | | 234 | 0.7 | N/A |
| BNP | | | | | 195 | 0.6 | N/A |
| UKIP | | | | | 194 | 0.6 | N/A |
| Socialist Labour | | | | | 189 | 0.6 | N/A |
| Scottish Socialist | | | | | 95 | 0.3 | N/A |
| Solidarity | | | | | 41 | 0.1 | N/A |
| Independent | Richard Vassie | | | | 24 | 0.1 | N/A |
| Others | | | | | 201 | 0.6 | N/A |
| Majority | | 2,012 | 6.4 | N/A | | | |
| Valid votes | | 31,924 | | | 31,873 | | |
| Invalid votes | | 98 | | | 100 | | |
| Turnout | | 31,924 | 63.4 | N/A | 31,973 | 63.3 | N/A |
| Labour win (new boundaries) | | | | | | | |

=== 2000s ===
Scottish Parliament election, 2007 Notional Result: Eastwood
| Party | Candidate | Votes | % | ±% |
|---|---|---|---|---|
| Conservative | | 12,825 | 41.1 | |
| Labour | | 9,337 | 29.9 | |
| SNP | | 4,912 | 15.7 | |
| Liberal Democrats | | 3,141 | 10.1 | |
| Others | | 986 | 3.2 | |
| Majority | | 3,488 | 11.2 | |
| Conservative gain from Labour | | Swing | | |

Scottish Parliament election, 2007: Eastwood
| Notes: | Blue background denotes the winner of the electorate vote. Pink background denotes a candidate elected from their party list. Yellow background denotes an electorate win by a list member, or other incumbent. A ✓ or ✗ denotes status of any incumbent, win or lose respectively. | | | | | | |
| Party | Candidate | Votes | % | ±% | Party votes | % | ±% |
|---|---|---|---|---|---|---|---|
| Labour | ✓ Kenneth Macintosh | 15,077 | 35.76 | −0.10 | 12,365 | 29.41 | |
| Conservative | Jackson Carlaw | 14,186 | 33.64 | +7.30 | 11,470 | 27.28 | |
| SNP | Stewart Maxwell | 7,972 | 18.91 | +6.73 | 9,460 | 22.50 | |
| Liberal Democrats | Gordon MacDonald | 3,603 | 8.55 | −4.45 | 3,332 | 7.92 | |
| Independent | Frank McGee | 1,327 | 3.15 | +3.15 | | | |
| Green | | | | | 1,515 | 3.60 | |
| Scottish Senior Citizens | | | | | 737 | 1.75 | |
| Solidarity | | | | | 631 | 1.50 | |
| BNP | | | | | 505 | 1.20 | |
| CPA | | | | | 502 | 1.19 | |
| Scottish Christian | | | | | 500 | 1.19 | |
| Save Our NHS Group | | | | | 376 | 0.89 | |
| Scottish Unionist Party (modern) | | | | | 156 | 0.37 | |
| Scottish Socialist | | | | | 143 | 0.34 | |
| Socialist Labour | | | | | 126 | 0.30 | |
| UKIP | | | | | 112 | 0.27 | |
| Scottish Voice | | | | | 56 | 0.13 | |
| Scottish Jacobite | | | | | 50 | 0.12 | |
| Socialist Equality | | | | | 12 | 0.03 | |
| Informal votes | | 990 | | | 1,107 | | |
| Total valid votes | | 42,165 | | | 42,048 | | |
| Turnout | | 43,155 | | | | | |
| Labour hold | Majority | 891 | 2.11 | −7.5 | | | |

2003 Scottish Parliament election: Eastwood
| Party | Candidate | Votes | % | ±% |
|---|---|---|---|---|
| Labour | Kenneth Macintosh | 13,946 | 35.9 | −1.5 |
| Conservative | Jackson Carlaw | 10,244 | 26.3 | −6.4 |
| Liberal Democrats | Allan Steele | 5,056 | 13.0 | +3.2 |
| SNP | Stewart Maxwell | 4,736 | 12.2 | −7.1 |
| Independent | Margaret Hinds | 3,163 | 8.1 | New |
| Scottish Socialist | Steve Oram | 1,504 | 3.8 | New |
| Scottish People's | Martyn Greene | 240 | 0.6 | New |
| Majority | | 3,702 | 9.6 | +4.9 |
| Turnout | | 38,889 | 58.0 | −1.5 |
| Labour hold | | Swing | | |

=== 1990s ===
1999 Scottish Parliament election: Eastwood
| Party | Candidate | Votes | % |
|---|---|---|---|
| Labour | Kenneth Macintosh | 16,970 | 37.4 |
| Conservative | John Young | 14,845 | 32.7 |
| SNP | Rachel Findlay | 8,760 | 19.3 |
| Liberal Democrats | Anna McCurley | 4,472 | 9.9 |
| Independent | Manar Tayan | 349 | 0.8 |
| Majority | | 2,125 | 4.68 |
| Turnout | | 45,396 | 59.5 |
| Labour win (new seat) | | | |

== See also ==
- List of Scottish Parliament constituencies and electoral regions (2026–)
