= 1999 East Renfrewshire Council election =

1999 Scottish local government election

← 1995	6 May 1999	2003 →

All 20 seats to East Renfrewshire Council 11 seats needed for a majority
	First party	Second party
Party	Labour	Conservative
Last election	8	9
Seats won	9	8
Seat change	▲1	▼1
Popular vote	14,449	14,715
Percentage	31.9%	32.4%
	Third party	Fourth party
Party	Liberal Democrats	Independent
Last election	2	0
Seats won	2	1
Seat change	0	▲1
Popular vote	6,184	1,714
Percentage	13.6%	3.8%
Council Leader before election
No overall control
Elected Council Leader
No overall control

1999 Elections to East Renfrewshire Council were held on 6 May 1999, the same day as the other Scottish local government elections and the Scottish Parliament election. The council remained under no overall control.

== Aggregate results ==
East Renfrewshire Council election, 1999
Party	Seats	Gains	Losses	Net gain/loss	Seats %	Votes %	Votes	+/−
Labour	9	1	0	▲1	45.0	31.5	14,399	▲0.2
Conservative	8	0	1	▼1	40.0	31.8	14,715	▲2.6
Liberal Democrats	2	0	0	0	10.0	13.6	6,184	▼1.2
Independent	1	1	0	▲1	5.0	3.8	1,714	▲3.0
SNP	0	0	0	0	0.0	19.3	8,302	▼1.4

== Ward results ==
Aucenback
Party	Candidate	Votes	%
Labour	E. Phillips	1,238	71.2
SNP	A. Felber	421	24.2
Conservative	G. Campbell	79	4.5
Majority		817	47.0

Barrhead Central
Party	Candidate	Votes	%
Labour	O. Taylor	1,198	46.3
SNP	D. Yates	463	24.7
Conservative	Ms R. Gilbert	213	11.4
Majority		735	21.6

Barrhead East
Party	Candidate	Votes	%
Labour	Ms. E. Cunningham	1,075	64.0
SNP	Ms. I. Zivalijevic	445	36.5
Conservative	A. Fordyce	159	9.5
Majority		630	37.5

Barrhead North
Party	Candidate	Votes	%
Labour	R. Garscadden	1,102	54.2
SNP	Ms. S. MacLeod	483	23.7
Conservative	W. McCort	450	22.1
Majority		619	30.5
