= St Luke's High School =

Coordinates: 55.790°N 4.386°W

St Lukes's High School
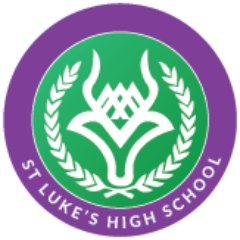

Location
- Springfield Road; Barrhead, East Renfrewshire, G78 2SG; Scotland

Information
- Type: Public, Secondary
- Motto: Love, Faith And Understanding.
- Religious affiliation: Roman Catholic
- Established: 1977
- School board: East Renfrewshire Council
- School district: Greater Glasgow And Strathclyde
- Local authority: East Renfrewshire Council
- Head teacher: Ciaran Hughes
- Officer in charge: PC Loraine
- Chaplain: Pastor John Of The Roman Catholic Diocese of Paisley
- Gender: co-educational
- Age: 11 to 18
- Enrolment: 675 (2023)
- Houses: Columba , Kentigern , Mirin and Ogilvie
- Colours: Green, purple and silver
- Nickname: SLHS
- National ranking: 92/347 (44% of students passing five or more Higher levels)
- Feeder Schools: St John's, St Mark's, St Thomas'
- Website: https://blogs.glowscotland.org.uk/er/StLukes/

St Luke's High School is a school in the Auchenback area of Barrhead, East Renfrewshire, in the Greater Glasgow area of Scotland. The school focuses on its Catholic ethos in teaching and its close relationship with the communities of Barrhead and Neilston, also rarely serving areas further afield including Paisley, Pollok, Glenburn and Uplawmoor.

== Associated primary schools ==
Also known as "feeder" schools, associated primary schools include:

- St John's Primary School, Commercial Road, Barrhead
- St Mark's Primary School, Roebank Drive, Barrhead
- St Thomas' Primary School, Broadlie Road, Neilston

== Notable former pupils ==
- Christopher Brookmyre, author
- Kevin Guthrie, actor
- Barrie McKay, footballer, Heart of Midlothian F.C., Rangers F.C., Raith Rovers F.C., Nottingham Forest F.C., and Swansea City A.F.C.
- Jon McShane, footballer, St Mirren F.C., Hamilton Academical F.C.
- Mark O'Hara, footballer
- Paul O'Kane, Scottish Labour politician, Member of the Scottish Parliament (MSP) for West Scotland
