= Paul O'Kane =

Scottish Labour Co-op politician

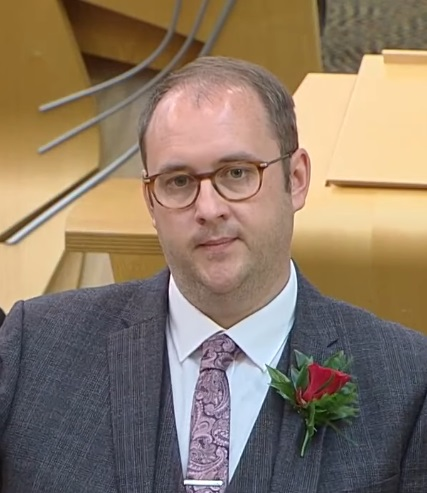

Deputy Convener of the Health, Social Care and Sport Committee
- In office 22 June 2021 – 25 April 2023
- Preceded by: Emma Harper

Member of the Scottish Parliament for West Scotland (1 of 7 Regional MSPs)
- In office 6 May 2021 – 9 April 2026

Scottish Labour portfolios
- 2021–2023: Shadow Minister for Public Health, Social Care and Drugs Policy
- 2023–2025: Shadow Cabinet Secretary for Social Justice and Social Security, and Equalities
- 2025–2026: Shadow Cabinet Secretary for Education and Equalities

Personal details
- Born: Paul Francis O'Kane; 21 March 1988 (age 38) Paisley, Renfrewshire, Scotland
- Party: Scottish Labour Co-operative
- Education: University of Glasgow

Paul Francis O'Kane (born 21 March 1988) is a Scottish Labour and Co-operative politician. He served as a Member of the Scottish Parliament (MSP) for the West Scotland region from 2021 until 2026.

== Early life ==
Born in Paisley, and growing up in Neilston (where his maternal family are from), O'Kane attended St Thomas' Primary in Neilston and St Luke's High School in Barrhead. From there he went on to study at the University of Glasgow for an MA (Hons) in English Literature and Politics. Whilst attending the University of Glasgow, he was chair of the University Labour Club. O'Kane's paternal grandparents came from Derry and Co.Tyrone in N.Ireland. They settled in Ladyton, Bonhill in the Vale of Leven, West Dunbartonshire where O'Kane's father attended St Patrick's High School in Dumbarton and played football as a goalkeeper at county and Scottish level for the school and then at junior level for Vale of Leven FC.

== Third Sector career ==
After graduating from university in 2010, O'Kane worked as a Development Officer with Volunteer Centre East Dunbartonshire. He then worked for the Beardmore Trust in Clydebank, West Dunbartonshire. Prior to his election to the Scottish Parliament, he worked for seven years with ENABLE Scotland, a major learning disability charity and social care provider, leaving the role of Policy and Participation Manager upon his election to Parliament.

== Political career ==
O'Kane worked as a parliamentary researcher to two Scottish Labour MPs, Jim Murphy MP for East Renfrewshire (2007–10) and Gemma Doyle MP for West Dunbartonshire (2012–13). He served as a member of East Renfrewshire Council from 2012, representing the people of Neilston, Uplawmoor and Newton Mearns North and served as Deputy Education convenor. He was re-elected in 2017 to represent the new council ward Newton Mearns North and Neilston following boundary changes and became Deputy Leader of East Renfrewshire Council as well as Convenor for Education and Equalities. He was the Scottish Labour group leader on the council from 2017 to 2021. He stood down as a councillor at the 2022 council elections.

On 6 April 2015, he was chased down a street in Barrhead by a man with a chainsaw while campaigning for Jim Murphy in the 2015 general election.

O'Kane was chosen to defend the Renfrewshire South constituency at the 2016 Scottish Parliament election, succeeding retiring MSP Hugh Henry. Finishing second with 9,864 votes (33.2%), he was unsuccessful in retaining the constituency, which saw the Scottish National Party's Tom Arthur win the seat.

=== Member of the Scottish Parliament ===
At the 2021 Scottish Parliament election, O’Kane re-contested Renfrewshire South, coming second with 10,426 votes (30.0%). He was placed fourth on the party list for the West Scotland region, and was one of the three successful Labour candidates to be elected.

He served as Deputy Convenor of the Health, Social Care and Sport Committee from 2021 until 2023 and Scottish Labour Shadow Minister for Public Health, Social Care and Drugs Policy. In April 2023, he was promoted to the position of Shadow Cabinet Secretary for Social Justice and Social and Equalities replacing Pam Duncan Glancy who moved to the Education and Skills Portfolio. In December 2025 he was appointed Shadow Cabinet Secretary for Education and Equalities

In the 2026 Scottish Parliament election he was the Labour candidate in Renfrewshire West and Levern Valley but was unsuccessful.

In early 2026 the Scottish Labour Party announced their Regional List rankings as voted for by Party members. Despite placing 3rd in the ballot after his Party colleagues Jackie Baillie (who was automatically number one by virtue of being Deputy Leader) and Neil Bibby who was number two, he was ‘zipped’ due to the gender balancing mechanism approved by the Scottish Executive Committee of the Scottish Labour Party to 4th in favour of Katy Clark. As he was 4th on the regional list he was not re-elected to the Scottish Parliament.

== Post-Parliamentary Career ==
In June 2026 O'Kane launched Oak Grove Strategies, a public affairs consultancy. In July 2026, O'Kane was appointed as Director of Christians on the Left, a Labour-affiliated socialist society which represents Christians.

== Personal life ==
O'Kane was the first openly gay man elected to the Scottish Parliament for Scottish Labour. He is a practicing Catholic. O'Kane married his husband in August 2021. O'Kane has UK and Irish citizenship. His second cousin is Hugh Logue a former Executive member of the Northern Ireland Civil Rights Association,founder member of the SDLP and former member of the Northern Ireland Assembly (1982).
