= List of places in East Renfrewshire =

Map of places in East Renfrewshire compiled from this list
See the list of places in Scotland for places in other counties.

This is a list of articles about places/areas in the East Renfrewshire council area of Scotland.

== B ==
- Barrhead
- Busby

== C ==
- Clarkston

== E ==
- Eaglesham

== G ==
- Giffnock

== H ==
- Hurlet

== N ==
- Neilston
- Netherlee
- Newton Mearns

== P ==
- Patterton (Newton Mearns)

== S ==
- Stamperland (Clarkston)

== T ==
- Thornliebank

== U ==
- Uplawmoor

== W ==
- Waterfoot
- Whitecraigs, Giffnock/Newton Mearns
- Williamwood, Clarkston/Netherlee
- Woodfarm, Giffnock/Thornliebank

== See also ==
- List of places in Scotland
