= Colm Merrick =

Member of the Scottish Parliament

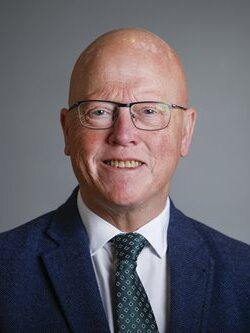
- Official Portrait, 2026

Member of Scottish Parliament for Glasgow Anniesland
- Incumbent
- Assumed office 7 May 2026
- Preceded by: Bill Kidd
- Majority: 4,659 (15.1%)

Personal details
- Party: Scottish National Party

Colm Merrick is a member of the Scottish National Party (SNP) who represents the constituency of Glasgow Anniesland since 2026 as an MSP, succeeding Bill Kidd. He previously contested Eastwood in the 2021 Scottish Parliament election.

Merrick is also a member of East Renfrewshire Council representing the ward of Giffnock and Thornliebank, elected in 2017 and 2022.
