= Clarkston explosion =

Fatal 1971 gas explosion in Scotland

- Date: 21 October 1971
- Time: just before 15:00
- Location: Clarkston, East Renfrewshire, Scotland; 55.790°N 4.277°W
- Type: Gas explosion
- Cause: Gas Leak
- Deaths: 22
- Injuries: 100+

The Clarkston explosion was a disaster that occurred on 21 October 1971 in a row of shops on the main street of Clarkston, East Renfrewshire, Scotland. Sources from the time state the death toll as 21, whilst modern sources state 22.

The explosion followed a build-up of gas in an underground space beneath the then six-year-old Clarkston Toll shops, caused by a gas main leak later ruled to have been accidental. Customers and shop staff had on 20 October complained of a strong smell of gas in the centre and Scottish Gas Board engineers had attended to investigate, but had identified no source for the smell. The engineers were still in attendance at around 2:50 pm on the following day when the gas ignited and exploded, killing 22 people and injuring around 100. The victims included many shop staff and people on shopping trips, and the passengers of a bus that had been passing the scene. The explosion destroyed 10 shops and a car park above them.

An inquiry was held, and a jury on 11 February 1972 returned a verdict that no fault for the explosion lay with any organisation or individual. No cause was identified for the ignition of the leaked gas, and the leak itself was deemed the result of an accidental gas main fracture caused by "stress and corrosion". The main had been insufficiently supported to withstand vibrations from traffic, and a large crack was found in it during the investigation.

The victims of the disaster are commemorated in a plaque erected in 2002 near the site of the explosion. There is a further tribute to those who lost their lives situated in the entranceway to the Clarkston Halls.

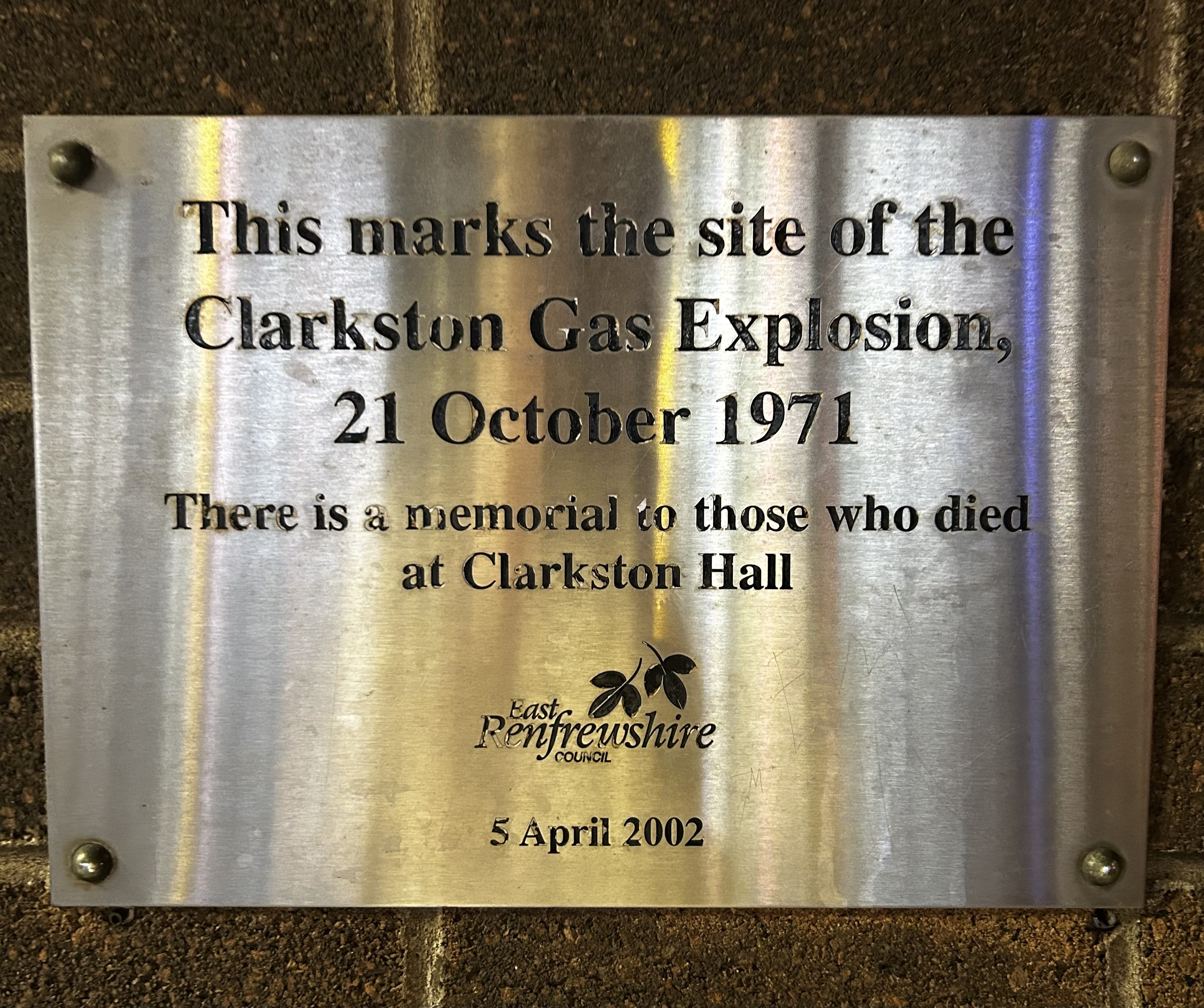
The memorial plaque near the site of the explosion

Scottish Television produced a programme on the Clarkston disaster which aired on 20 November 2017.

== Deaths ==
The Scottish international badminton player Maureen Hume was one of the people that lost their life in the explosion.
