= Winifred Drinkwater =

Scottish aviator (1913–1996)

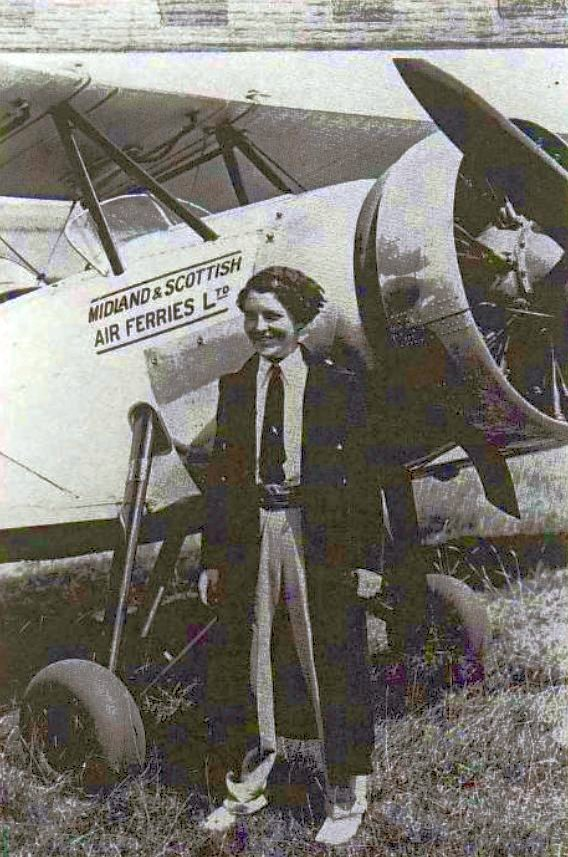
Winifred Drinkwater
- Born: 11 April 1913; Waterfoot, Scotland
- Died: 6 October 1996 (aged 83); Taumarunui, New Zealand
- Other names: Winnie Drinkwater; Winifred Short; Winifred Orchard
- Occupations: Aviator, commercial airline pilot and engineer
- Known for: The first female commercial airline pilot in the world
- Spouse(s): Francis Short (19 July 1934 – 1954) his death William Orchard (not known - 1983) his death
- Children: 2, Anne Brewer (formerly Short) and Tupney Short

Winifred Joyce "Winnie" Drinkwater (11 April 1913 – 6 October 1996) was a pioneering Scottish aviator and aeroplane engineer. She was the first woman in the world to hold a commercial pilot's licence.

== Biography ==
Drinkwater was born on 11 April 1913 at Waterfoot, Scotland, the youngest of the three children of Emma Banner and Albert Drinkwater, an engineer.

== Flying career ==
Drinkwater joined the Scottish Flying Club near Renfrew on 2 June 1930. She trained under Captain John Houston, an instructor at the club. When she qualified for her private pilot's licence later that year she became Scotland's youngest pilot.

On 8 May 1932, aged 19, she gained her "B" (commercial) licence at Cinque Ports Flying Club at Lympne in Kent, making her the youngest professional pilot in the United Kingdom and the world's first female commercial pilot. Regulations at the time required pilots to be 19 years of age, Drinkwater commented to the press, "I decided to qualify for a professional licence. I could not do that until I became 19 because of the regulations, and immediately after my birthday in April I started. I have been at Lympne for three weeks, and it has been a gruelling time." A test of night flying was required as part of the qualification and despite the floodlights failing at Lympne Aerodrome on the night of her test flight, she landed successfully with the assistance of flares. Drinkwater also gained her instructor's certificate later in 1932, and her ground engineer licence in 1933.

In September 1932 Drinkwater was awarded the Scottish Flying Club trophy for landing. On 11 October 1932 at Renfrew Aerodrome, she won one of the club's cups for air racing, winning by just 2 seconds over a course of 15 miles.

In 1933 Drinkwater was employed by John Cuthill Sword, the owner of Midland & Scottish Air Ferries as a commercial pilot. She made her first scheduled flight from Renfrew Aerodrome to Campbeltown on 27 April 1933 in a de Havilland Fox Moth biplane. Later she flew scheduled flights from Glasgow to London in a de Havilland Dragon.

Some of her charter work with the airline included delivery of newspapers to the Scottish islands, press assignments including flying photographers over Loch Ness as they searched for the Loch Ness monster, air ambulance work on the Western Isles and undertaking an air search for a boat of kidnappers.

== Personal life ==
She met Francisco Short, the director of Short Brothers aeroplane manufacturer, at Renfrew Aerodrome. When they met she was dismantling an engine, wearing dungarees and covered in grease. Drinkwater's achievements drew much attention in the press and with the public. She received admiring letters from all over the world and was said to be the Scottish Amy Johnson. When she married Francisco Short, in Dumfries on 19 July 1934, they had planned a quiet wedding; however, news of their plans leaked out and a crowd formed, showering them with confetti. They had two children, a daughter Anne and a son Tupney.

Drinkwater rarely flew after her marriage. After Short's death in 1954, Drinkwater married William Orchard, a fisherman. After Orchard's death in 1983, she returned to Scotland living near Turnberry in Ayrshire. She later moved to New Zealand to live with her daughter.

== Commemoration ==
A bronze bust celebrating Drinkwater was erected at Clyde View Park in Renfrew in 2005.

In 2023, local politicians in Cardonald announced plans for Drinkwater to feature in the first of a number of interactive murals in the area, with her story and background to the street art provided via a QR code. The mural was completed in July 2023.

Drinkwater is described as a "Trailblazer" by the tour company Gallus Pedals with a bicycle being named after her. The website's bicycles commemorates the trailblazers in several different categories.Drinkwater is in the category "Women Who Redefined What Is Possible".
