= 2007 East Renfrewshire Council election =

2007 Scottish local government election

← 2003	3 May 2007	2012 →

All 20 seats to East Renfrewshire Council 11 seats needed for a majority
	First party	Second party	Third party
Party	Conservative	Labour	SNP
Last election	7	8	0
Seats won	7	7	3
Seat change	0	▼1	▲3
Popular vote	14,567	11,825	6,794
Percentage	34.3%	27.8%	16.0%
	Fourth party	Fifth party
Party	Independent	Liberal Democrats
Last election	2	3
Seats won	2	1
Seat change	0	▼2
Popular vote	4,589	4,317
Percentage	10.8%	10.2%
- Results of the election by ward
Council Leader before election
No overall control
Elected Council Leader
No overall control

Elections to East Renfrewshire Council were held on 3 May 2007 the same day as the other Scottish local government elections and the Scottish Parliament general election.

The election was the first using six new wards created as a result of the Local Governance (Scotland) Act 2004. Each ward elected three or four councillors using the single transferable vote system of proportional representation. The new wards replaced 20 single-member wards which used the plurality (first past the post) system of election.

== Election results ==
East Renfrewshire Local Election Result 2007
Party	Seats	Gains	Losses	Net gain/loss	Seats %	Votes %	Votes	+/−
Conservative	7	N/A	N/A	▲1	35.0	34.3	14,567	
Labour	7	N/A	N/A	▼1	35.0	27.8	11,825	
SNP	3	N/A	N/A	▲3	15.0	16.0	6,794	
Liberal Democrats	1	N/A	N/A	▼2	5.0	10.2	4,317	
Scottish Green	0	N/A	N/A	0	0.0	0.6	247	
Scottish Socialist	0	N/A	N/A	0	0.0	0.4	177	
Independent	2	N/A	N/A	▼1	10.0	10.8	4,589	

== Ward results ==
=== Neilston, Uplawmoor and Newton Mearns North (4 seats) ===
Neilston, Uplawmoor and Newton Mearns North
Party	Candidate	FPv%	Count							
Party	Candidate	FPv%	1	2	3	4	5	6	7	8
Conservative	Charlie Gilbert	22.7	1,778							
Labour	Elaine Green	21.2	1,658							
SNP	Tony Buchanan	18.3	1,434	1,449.78	1,457.58	1,465.87	1,616.20			
Conservative	Leslie Rosin	12.1	944	1,069.20	1,071.50	1,084.92	1,187.05	1,192.66	1,349.21	1,542.26
Labour	Nasim Kahn	8.1	638	647.02	700.75	710.08	817.79	825.59	950.52	
Liberal Democrats	Kirsty Platt	8.1	636	654.28	661.08	673.55				
Independent	George Butler	7.9	622	630.90	633.53	683.04	806.60	817.26		
Independent	Ella Rae	1.6	123	128.70	130.29					
Electorate: 13,147 Valid: 7,833 Spoilt: 133 Quota: 1,567

=== Barrhead (4 seats) ===
Barrhead
Party	Candidate	FPv%	Count									
Party	Candidate	FPv%	1	2	3	4	5	6	7	8	9	10
Independent	Danny Devlin	25.3	1,891									
Labour	Betty Cunningham	20.4	1,526									
SNP	Douglas Yates	17.6	1,318	1,378.31	1,380.54	1,402.26	1,415.39	1,481.88	1,510.74			
Labour	Edward Philips	13.4	999	1,031.25	1,044.09	1,054.34	1,065.13	1,089.96	1,267.66	1,269.90	1,329.24	1,523.36
Conservative	Tariq Pavez	7.5	558	580.41	580.93	582.93	593.13	624.45	624.74	626.33		
Independent	Tommy Reilly	7.0	520	584.92	587.37	594.85	662.98	696.73	706.19	706.37	838.43	
Labour	Edwina Phillips	3.3	247	259.56	262.61	263.69	269.55	286.51				
Liberal Democrats	Tom Platt	3.2	236	250.87	251.84	259.90	264.69					
Independent	Rena McGuire	1.5	111	154.56	156.02	164.94						
Scottish Socialist	Liam McGregor	0.9	65	71.49	72.12							
Electorate: 12,366 Valid: 7,471 Spoilt: 109 Quota: 1,495

=== Giffnock and Thornliebank (3 seats) ===
Giffnock and Thornliebank
Party	Candidate	FPv%	Count					
Party	Candidate	FPv%	1	2	3	4	5	6
Labour	Jim Fletcher	29.8	2,075					
Conservative	Gordon Wallace	27.2	1,899					
SNP	Joyce Lythgoe	18.2	1,266	1,330.16	1,336.00	1,390.31	1,473.32	
Liberal Democrats	Alex Mackie	17.9	1,244	1,357.28	1.365.41	1,401.65	1,585.21	2,472.07
Conservative	Gordon Wilson	5.4	373	394.92	524.70	528.50		
Scottish Socialist	Stuart Miller	1.6	112	132.16	132.32			
Electorate: 10,846 Valid: 6,969 Spoilt: 98 Quota: 1,743

=== Netherlee, Stamperland and Williamwood (3 seats) ===
Netherlee, Stamperland and Williamwood
Party	Candidate	FPv%	Count						
Party	Candidate	FPv%	1	2	3	4	5	6	7
Labour	Mary Montague	23.5	1,644	1,691	1,852				
Independent	Ralph Robertson	18.9	1,322	1,365	1,468	1,489.09	1,567.60	1,648.68	2,144.92
Conservative	Gordon McCaskill	16.9	1,182	1,191	1,243	1,249.97	2,080.41		
Conservative	Laurence Haniford	14.7	1,028	1,035	1,092	1,097.33			
SNP	Oliver Adair	13.7	954	1,006	1,139	1,163.15	1,215.49	1,262.81	
Liberal Democrats	Ian Clarkson	8.7	609	660					
Scottish Green	Duncan Toms	3.5	247						
Electorate: 10,095 Valid: 6,986 Spoilt: 53 Quota: 1,747

=== Newton Mearns South (3 seats) ===
Newton Mearns South
Party	Candidate	FPv%	Count				
Party	Candidate	FPv%	1	2	3	4	5
Conservative	Barbara Grant	36.6	2,283				
Conservative	Jim Swift	26.4	1,649				
Labour	Ian McAlpine	17.1	1,068	1,140.32	1,147.86	1,287.45	1,884.38
SNP	Christopher McLaughlin	10.3	645	720.16	730.40		
Liberal Democrats	Alan Rennie	9.6	601	784.17	805.27	1,140.60	
Electorate: 9,586 Valid: 6,246 Spoilt: 67 Quota: 1,562

=== Busby, Clarkston and Eaglesham (3 seats) ===
Busby, Clarkston and Eaglesham
Party	Candidate	FPv%	Count				
Party	Candidate	FPv%	1	2	3	4	5
Labour	Alan Lafferty	28.1	1,970				
Conservative	Stewart Miller	22.4	1,571	1,592.37	1,773.62		
Conservative	Alec White	18.6	1,302	1,310.70	1,516.43	1,531.22	
SNP	Alistair Carmichael	16.8	1,177	1,220.51	1,537.11	1,539.04	2,014.86
Liberal Democrats	George Napier	14.1	991	1,061.28			
Electorate: 10,521 Valid: 7,011 Spoilt: 89 Quota: 1,753
