= 2022 East Renfrewshire Council election =

East Renfrewshire Council election

- 5 May 2022

All 18 seats to East Renfrewshire Council 10 seats needed for a majority
- Turnout: 52.7%

	First party	Second party
Leader	Tony Buchanan	Gordon Wallace
Party	SNP	Conservative
Leader's seat	Newton Mearns North and Neilston	Giffnock and Thornliebank
Last election	5	7
Seats won	6	5
Seat change	▲1	▼2
Popular vote	11,249	11,599
Percentage	28.6%	29.5%
Swing	▲4.3%	▼8.8%
	Third party	Fourth party
Leader	Owen O'Donnell	N/A
Party	Labour	Independent
Leader's seat	Newton Mearns North and Neilston	N/A
Last election	4	2
Seats won	5	2
Seat change	▲1	Steady
Popular vote	7,973	5,571
Percentage	20.2%	14.1%
Swing	▲2.8%	▼4.9%
- The 5 multi-member wards
Council Leader before election
Tony Buchanan
SNP
Council Leader after election
Owen O'Donnell
Labour

The 2022 East Renfrewshire Council election took place on 5 May 2022 on the same day as the 31 other Scottish local government elections. The election used the 5 wards created under the Local Governance (Scotland) Act 2004, with 18 councillors being elected. Each ward elected either 3 or 4 members, using the STV electoral system.

== Background ==
=== Composition ===
Party	2017 result	Dissolution
SNP	5	5
Labour	4	4
Conservative	7	5
Independent	2	4

=== Changes since 2017 ===
Barrhead, Liboside & Uplawmoor Conservative Cllr Paul Aitken resigned from the Scottish Conservatives and became an independent on 22 January 2018.

Clarkston, Netherlee & Williamwood Conservative Cllr Stewart Miller resigned from the Scottish Conservatives and became an independent on 10 September 2020.

== Results ==
2022 East Renfrewshire Council election result
Party	Seats	Gains	Losses	Net gain/loss	Seats %	Votes %	Votes	+/−
SNP	6	1	0	▲1	33.3	28.6	11,249	▲4.3
Conservative	5	0	2	▼2	27.8	29.5	11,599	▼8.8
Labour	5	1	0	▲1	27.8	20.2	7,973	▲2.8
Independent	2	0	0	Steady	11.1	14.1	5,571	▼4.9
Green	0	0	0	Steady	0.0	5.4	2,111	▲4.0
Alba	0	0	0	Steady	0.0	0.9	341	New
Liberal Democrats	0	0	0	Steady	0.0	0.5	203	▼1.7
Scottish Family	0	0	0	Steady	0.0	0.5	203	New
Freedom Alliance	0	0	0	Steady	0.0	0.2	67	New
ISP	0	0	0	Steady	0.0	0.1	57	New

Note: Votes are the sum of first preference votes across all council wards. The net gain/loss and percentage changes relate to the result of the previous Scottish local elections on 4 May 2017. This is because STV has an element of proportionality which is not present unless multiple seats are being elected. This may differ from other published sources showing gain/loss relative to seats held at the dissolution of Scotland's councils.

=== Ward summary ===
Results of the 2022 East Renfrewshire Council election by ward (first preferences)
Ward	%	Cllrs	%	Cllrs	%	Cllrs	%	Cllrs	%	Cllrs	Total Cllrs
Ward	SNP		Labour		Conservative		Independent		Others		Total Cllrs
Barrhead, Liboside and Uplawmoor	33.4	2	20.1	1	10.7	0	31.1	1	4.5	0	4
Newton Mearns North and Neilston	32.1	1	25.4	1	34.5	1			8.0	0	3
Giffnock and Thornliebank	26.1	1	22.2	1	25.1	1	19.9	0	6.7	0	3
Clarkston, Netherlee and Williamwood	29.0	1	16.8	1	23.5	1	20.7	1	10.0	0	4
Newton Mearns South & Eaglesham	24.3	1	19.1	1	48.9	2			7.8	0	4
Total	28.5	6	20.2	5	29.5	5	14.1	2	7.6	0	18

== Ward results ==
=== Barrhead, Liboside and Uplawmoor ===
Barrhead, Liboside and Uplawmoor - 4 seats
Party	Candidate	FPv%	Count							
Party	Candidate	FPv%	1	2	3	4	5	6	7	8
Independent	Danny Devlin (incumbent)	26.0%	1,753							
SNP	Angela Convery (incumbent)	24.3%	1,639							
Labour	Betty Wood Cunningham (incumbent)	20.1%	1,355							
Conservative	Greg Turner†	10.7%	722	760	761	762	767	780	898	
SNP	Chris Lunday	9.1%	616	691	935	936	968	1,105	1,198	1,282
Independent	Paul Aitken (incumbent)	5.1%	345	462	470	472	491	536		
Green	Frank Wilson	3.4%	229	258	272	273	285			
Alba	Neil Anderson	1.1%	74	91	96	96				
Electorate: 14,485 Valid: 6,733 Spoilt: 133 (1.93%) Quota: 1,347 Turnout: 47.2%

† Greg Turner was suspended from the Conservative Party on 21 April 2022, prior to the election, after being linked to derogatory online remarks against Catholics. His name remained on the ballot paper, as the deadline for nominations had passed.

=== Newton Mearns North and Neilston ===
Newton Mearns North and Neilston - 3 seats
Party	Candidate	FPv%	Count
Party	Candidate	FPv%	1
SNP	Tony Buchanan (incumbent)	32.1%	1,938
Conservative	Andrew Morrison	26.2%	1,579
Labour	Owen O'Donnell	25.4%	1,532
Conservative	Farooq Choudhry	8.3%	501
Green	Adrian Egglestone	5.3%	322
Scottish Family	Maria Reid	1.4%	84
Alba	Carol McKenzie	0.9%	55
Freedom Alliance (UK)	Derek McMillan	0.4%	23
Electorate: 12,397 Valid: 6,034 Spoilt: 72 (1.2%) Quota: 1,509 Turnout: 49%

=== Giffnock and Thornliebank ===
Giffnock and Thornliebank - 3 seats
Party	Candidate	FPv%	Count				
Party	Candidate	FPv%	1	2	3	4	5
SNP	Colm Merrick (incumbent)	26.1%	1,888				
Conservative	Gordon Wallace (incumbent)	25.1%	1,816				
Labour	Mary Montague	22.2%	1,608	1,629	1,630	1,662	1,863
Independent	Allan Steele	13.5%	978	983	986	998	1,033
Independent	Alice Roy	6.4%	464	469	470	488	576
Green	Karen Sharkey	5.4%	387	418	418	439	
Alba	George Gebbie	1.3%	92	97	97		
Electorate: 12,996 Valid: 7,233 Spoilt: 80 (1.1%) Quota: 1,809 Turnout: 56.2%

=== Clarkston, Netherlee and Williamwood ===
Clarkston, Netherlee and Williamwood - 4 seats
Party	Candidate	FPv%	Count							
Party	Candidate	FPv%	1	2	3	4	5	6	7	8
SNP	Annette Ireland (incumbent)	21.6%	2,119							
Conservative	Kate Campbell	17.2%	1,692	1,692	1,694	1,710	2,254			
Labour	Katie Victoria Pragnell	16.8%	1,647	1,654	1,657	1,728	1,743	1,798	1,908	2,116
Independent	David Macdonald (incumbent)	14.3%	1,407	1,415	1,425	1,448	1,471	1,541	1,868	2,017
SNP	David Tam McDonald	7.4%	724	838	852	863	864	867	895	1,233
Green	Gordon Keenan	7.3%	717	737	745	780	787	796	846	
Independent	Stewart Miller (incumbent)	6.4%	624	626	634	656	673	718		
Conservative	Gerald Edwards	6.3%	622	622	622	627				
Liberal Democrats	Daphne Vlastari	2.1%	203	204	206					
ISP	Colette Walker	0.6%	57	58						
Electorate: 16,612 Valid: 9,812 Spoilt: 165 (1.6%) Quota: 1,963 Turnout: 60.2%

=== Newton Mearns South and Eaglesham ===
Newton Mearns South and Eaglesham - 4 seats
Party	Candidate	FPv%	Count								
Party	Candidate	FPv%	1	2	3	4	5	6	7	8	9
SNP	Caroline Bamforth (incumbent)	24.3%	2,325								
Conservative	Paul Edlin	21.1%	2,016								
Labour	Andrew Anderson	19.1%	1,831	1,938							
Conservative	Jim McLean (incumbent)	16.6%	1,584	1,600	1,685	1,690	1,691	1,721	1,733	1,823	2,888
Conservative	Paul Smith	11.2%	1,067	1,070	1,082	1,083	1,087	1,106	1,113	1,154	
Green	Victoria Palmer-Dyer	4.8%	456	649	650	658	665	688	738		
Alba	Amer Siddiqui	1.3%	120	146	147	147	152	164			
Scottish Family	Luke Reid	1.2%	119	123	123	124	133				
Freedom Alliance (UK)	Mark Niven Turnbull	0.5%	44	45	45	46					
Electorate: 18,174 Valid: 9,562 Spoilt: 139 (1.4%) Quota: 1,913 Turnout: 53.1%

== Aftermath ==
After this election, a minority coalition was formed with the five Labour councillors and the two Independent councillors, David Macdonald and Danny Devlin. The SNP accused Labour of a 'backroom deal' with the Conservatives.

On 4 July 2022, Macdonald left the coalition, and the council's administration. Responding to a query on social media, he said: "The agreement I reached with the Labour group leader for my support to install a minority Labour, Independent administration was not going to be delivered. I lost trust and confidence and for that reason I could not, in good faith, continue."

In April 2024, SNP councillor Annette Ireland resigned from the SNP group and became an independent.

=== Barrhead, Liboside and Uplawmoor by-election ===
In June 2025, Labour councillor for Barrhead, Liboside and Uplawmoor, Betty Wood Cunningham, died. A by-election was held on 21 August 2025 and was won by Labour candidate Julie Ann Costello McHale.

Barrhead, Liboside and Uplawmoor by-election (21 August 2025) - 1 seat
Party	Candidate	FPv%	Count					
Party	Candidate	FPv%	1	2	3	4	5	6
Labour	Julie Costello McHale	41.9%	1,901	1,906	1,970	2,029	2,217	2,866
SNP	David McDonald	25.1%	1,142	1,142	1,151	1,292	1,431	
Reform	Andy MacGibbon	22.4%	1,018	1,022	1,076	1,089		
Green	Karen Sharkey	5.4%	247	252	266			
Conservative	Farooq Choudury	4.6%	207	211				
Abolish the Scottish Parliament	Gus Ferguson	0.6%	27					
Valid: 4,542 Spoilt: 43 Quota: 2,272 Turnout: 4,585
