= Renfrew (district) =

Former local government area in Scotland

Coordinates: 55°50′N 4°30′W

- District
- History
  - Created: 16 May 1975
  - Abolished: 31 March 1996
  - Succeeded by: Renfrewshire; East Renfrewshire
- Government: Renfrew District Council
  - HQ: Paisley

Renfrew District (Scottish Gaelic: Sgìre Rinn Friù) was, between 1975 and 1996, one of nineteen local government districts in the Strathclyde region of Scotland.

== History ==
The district was created in 1975 under the Local Government (Scotland) Act 1973, which established a two-tier structure of local government across mainland Scotland comprising upper-tier regions and lower-tier districts. Renfrew was one of nineteen districts created within the region of Strathclyde. The district covered the area of seven former districts from the historic county of Renfrewshire, all of which were abolished at the same time:

- Barrhead Burgh
- Johnstone Burgh
- Paisley Burgh
- Renfrew Burgh
- Second District, being the landward (outside a burgh) parts of the parishes of Paisley and Neilston.
- Third District, being the parishes of Erskine and Inchinnan, the eastern part of Houston, and the landward part of Renfrew.
- Fourth District, being the parishes of Kilbarchan and Lochwinnoch and the western part of Houston.

The remaining parts of Renfrewshire were divided between the Eastwood and Inverclyde districts. The three districts together formed a single lieutenancy area.

The district was named after the town of Renfrew, a royal burgh which had given its name to the county of Renfrewshire, but the district's largest town and administrative headquarters was Paisley.

The district was abolished in 1996 under the Local Government etc. (Scotland) Act 1994 which replaced regions and districts with unitary council areas. Renfrewshire council area was created covering most of the Renfrew District, but the Barrhead electoral division (roughly corresponding to the pre-1975 burgh of Barrhead and parish of Neilston) went instead to East Renfrewshire.

== Political control ==
The first election to the district council was held in 1974, initially operating as a shadow authority alongside the outgoing authorities until it came into its powers on 16 May 1975. Political control of the council from 1975 was as follows:

Party in control	Years
Labour	1975–1977
No overall control	1977–1980
Labour	1980–1996

== Premises ==
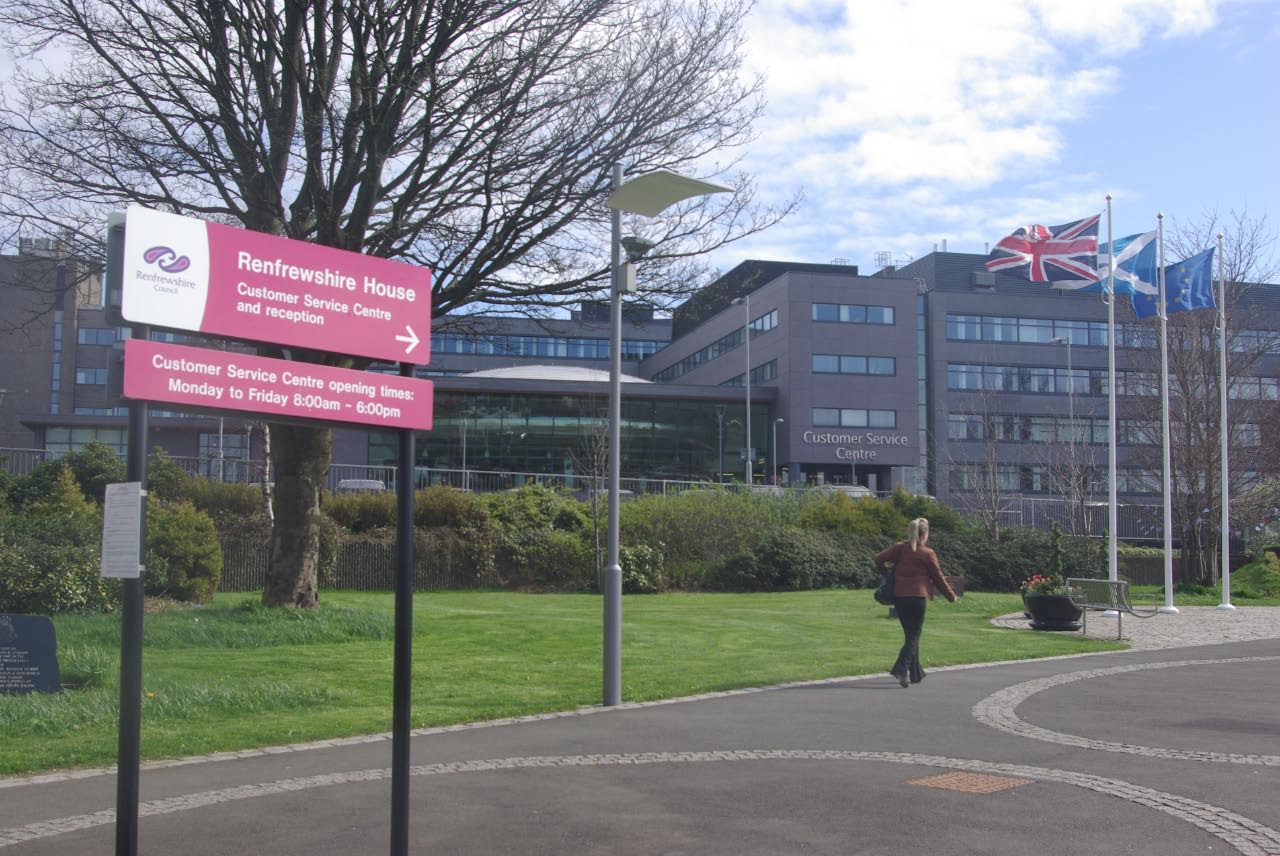
Municipal Buildings, Cotton Street, Paisley (now Renfrewshire House)

The council was based at the Municipal Buildings on Cotton Street in Paisley, which had been completed between 1969 and 1973 as the "County and Municipal Buildings", being a joint facility for the old Renfrewshire County Council and Paisley Town Council. The council shared the building with Strathclyde Regional Council, who used it as their Renfrewshire sub-regional office. Following the abolition of Renfrew District and Strathclyde in 1996 the building became the headquarters of Renfrewshire Council and was later renamed Renfrewshire House.

== See also ==
- 1992 Renfrew District Council election
