= Newton Mearns North and Neilston (ward) =

Electoral ward in East Renfrewshire, Scotland

Location of the ward

Newton Mearns North and Neilston is one of the five wards used to elect members of the East Renfrewshire Council. It elects three Councillors.

== Councillors ==
| Election | Councillors | | |
|---|---|---|---|
| 2017 | Tony Buchanan (SNP) | Paul O'Kane (Labour) | Charlie Gilbert (Conservative) |
| 2022 | Tony Buchanan (SNP) | Owen O'Donnell (Labour) | Andrew Morrison (Conservative) |

== Election results ==
=== 2022 election ===
2022 East Renfrewshire Council election

Newton Mearns North & Neilston - 3 seats
| Party | Candidate | FPv% | Count |
| Party | Candidate | FPv% | 1 |
|---|---|---|---|
| SNP | Tony Buchanan (incumbent) | 32.1% | 1,938 |
| Conservative | Farooq Choudhry | 8.3% | 501 |
| Green | Adrian Egglestone | 5.3% | 322 |
| Alba | Carol McKenzie | 0.9% | 55 |
| Freedom Alliance (UK) | Derek McMillan | 0.4% | 23 |
| Conservative | Andrew Morrison | 26.2% | 1,579 |
| Labour | Owen O'Donnell | 25.4% | 1,532 |
| Scottish Family | Maria Reid | 1.4% | 84 |
Electorate: 12,397 Valid: 6,034 Turnout: 49%

=== 2017 election ===
2017 East Renfrewshire Council election: Newton Mearns North and Neilston – 3 seats
| Party | Candidate | FPv% | Count |
| Party | Candidate | FPv% | 1 |
|---|---|---|---|
| Conservative | Charlie Gilbert (incumbent) (Note: Sitting councillor for the Neilston, Uplawmoor and Newton Mearns North ward which had been redrawn.) | 28.55% | 1,729 |
| SNP | Tony Buchanan (incumbent) | 25.62% | 1,551 |
| Labour | Paul O'Kane (incumbent) | 25.29% | 1,531 |
| Conservative | Andrew Morrison | 10.17% | 616 |
| Independent | Kirsteen Allan | 4.44% | 269 |
| Independent | David Jesner | 2.94% | 178 |
| Liberal Democrats | Roy Provan | 2.28% | 138 |
| UKIP | Stuart Sutherland | 0.50% | 30 |
| SDP | Robert Malyn | 0.21% | 13 |
Electorate: TBC Valid: 6,055 Spoilt: 79 Quota: 1,514 Turnout: 52.8%
