= Giffnock and Thornliebank (ward) =

Electoral ward in East Renfrewshire, Scotland

Location of the ward

Giffnock and Thornliebank is one of the five wards used to elect members of the East Renfrewshire Council. It elects three Councillors.

== Councillors ==
Election	Councillors		
2007	Jim Fletcher (Labour)	Alex Mackie (Liberal Democrats)	Gordon Wallace (Conservative)
2012	Jim Fletcher (Labour)	Vincent Waters (SNP)	Gordon Wallace (Conservative)
2017	Jim Fletcher (Labour)	Colm Merrick (SNP)	Gordon Wallace (Conservative)
2022	Mary Montague (Labour)	Colm Merrick (SNP)	Gordon Wallace (Conservative)

== Election results ==
=== 2022 election ===
2022 East Renfrewshire Council election: Giffnock and Thornliebank – 3 seats
Party	Candidate	FPv%	Count				
Party	Candidate	FPv%	1	2	3	4	5
SNP	Colm Merrick (incumbent)	26.1%	1,888				
Conservative	Gordon Wallace (incumbent)	25.1%	1,816				
Labour	Mary Montague	22.2%	1,608	1,629	1,630	1,662	1,863
Independent	Allan Steele	13.5%	978	983	986	998	1,033
Independent	Alice Roy	6.4%	464	469	470	488	576
Green	Karen Sharkey	5.4%	387	418	418	439	
Alba	George Gebbie	1.3%	92	97	97		
Electorate: 12,996 Valid: 7,233 Spoilt: 80 (1.1%) Quota: 1,809 Turnout: 56.2%

=== 2017 election ===
2017 East Renfrewshire Council election: Giffnock and Thornliebank – 3 seats
Party	Candidate	FPv%	Count								
Party	Candidate	FPv%	1	2	3	4	5	6	7	8	9
SNP	Colm Merrick	24.40%	1,853	1,855	1,860	1,898	1,990				
Conservative	Gordon Wallace (incumbent)	23.06%	1,751	1,753	1,758	1,784	1,825	1,826	2,621		
Labour	Jim Fletcher (incumbent)	18.84%	1,431	1,435	1,438	1,506	1,615	1,650	1,715	1,838	2,224
Conservative	Paul Smith	11.84%	899	904	905	943	976	979			
Independent	Paul Drury	11.31%	859	862	876	913	1,085	1,108	1,149	1,309	
Independent	Savio D'Souza	6.00%	456	460	470	507					
Liberal Democrats	Christopher Park	3.50%	266	274	278						
Independent	Gordon McCaskill *	0.63%	48	50							
Scottish Libertarian	Alan Findlay	0.42%	32								
Electorate: TBC Valid: 7,595 Spoilt: 92 Quota: 1,899 Turnout: 60.2%

=== 2012 election ===
2012 East Renfrewshire Council election: Giffnock and Thornliebank – 3 seats
Party	Candidate	FPv%	Count		
Party	Candidate	FPv%	1	2	3
Labour	Jim Fletcher (incumbent)	35.53	1,935		
Conservative	Gordon Wallace (incumbent)	21.36	1,163	1,207	1,398
SNP	Vincent Waters	19.89	1,083	1,209	1,375
Independent	Hugh Moore	11.84	645	751	994
Liberal Democrats	Alex Mackie (incumbent)	11.38	620	747	

=== 2007 election ===
2007 East Renfrewshire Council election: Giffnock and Thornliebank – 3 seats
Party	Candidate	FPv%	Count					
Party	Candidate	FPv%	1	2	3	4	5	6
Labour	Jim Fletcher	29.8	2,075					
Conservative	Gordon Wallace	27.2	1,899					
SNP	Joyce Lythgoe	18.2	1,266	1,330.16	1,336.00	1,390.31	1,473.32	
Liberal Democrats	Alex Mackie	17.9	1,244	1,357.28	1.365.41	1,401.65	1,585.21	2,472.07
Conservative	Gordon Wilson	5.4	373	394.92	524.70	528.50		
Scottish Socialist	Stuart Miller	1.6	112	132.16	132.32			
Electorate: – Valid: 6,969 Spoilt: 98 Quota: 1,743
