= Waterfoot, East Renfrewshire =

Coordinates: 55.764°N 4.283°W

Waterfoot: Scots: Watterfit
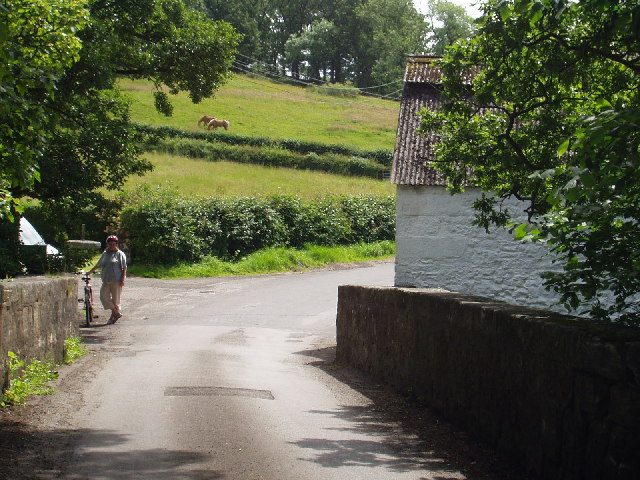
- Waterfoot Bridge

- Location within East Renfrewshire Waterfoot (East Renfrewshire)
- Population: 1,340 (2020)
- OS grid reference: NS569546
  - Edinburgh: 44 mi (71 km) ENE
  - London: 340 mi (550 km) SSE
- Community council: Eaglesham and Waterfoot
- Council area: East Renfrewshire
- Lieutenancy area: Renfrewshire
- Country: Scotland
- Sovereign state: United Kingdom
- Post town: Glasgow
- Postcode district: G76
- Dialling code: 0141
- Police: Scotland
- Fire: Scottish
- Ambulance: Scottish
- UK Parliament: East Renfrewshire
- Scottish Parliament: Eastwood

Waterfoot (Scots: Watterfit) is a hamlet in East Renfrewshire, Scotland. It is on the B767 road between Clarkston and Eaglesham, which are 1 mile (1.6 km) to the north and south respectively, while Newton Mearns is about 2 miles (3 km) to the west and East Kilbride about 5 miles (8 km) to the southeast. The hamlet shares a community council with the neighbouring community of Eaglesham, the Eaglesham and Waterfoot Community Council meets in Eaglesham on a monthly basis.

During the Second World War, deputy leader of the Nazi party Rudolf Hess, crash landed in Floors Farm, west of the hamlet. He was arrested and held in custody until after the war, when he was tried at the Nuremberg trials.

The audio equipment manufacturer Linn Products has its factory to the southwest of Waterfoot.

== Development ==
The Glasgow Southern Orbital road (part of the A726) passes just to the south of Waterfoot. The village lies on the west bank of the White Cart Water, and the original settlement grew up around a farm, mill (Dripps Mill) and smithy. One early record of the village is in Timothy Pont's maps of Scotland (1583–1596).

Waterfoot today is purely residential in character, having expanded as a commuter dormitory village, primarily in the latter half of the 20th century. The 2011 census reported that Waterfoot had a population of 1,280. There was some controversy in 2012 when East Renfrewshire Council wanted to sell Waterfoot Park to the housebuilder Cala Homes so that they could build 29 homes. A new park, Inky Pink Park, was created using funds provided by Cala to mitigate for the loss of Waterfoot Park when it was built on.

== Notable people ==
Winifred Drinkwater, the world's first female commercial airline pilot, was born in Waterfoot on 11 April 1913. Neil Munro, Scottish author, lived in Waterfoot during the early years of the 20th Century.

== Gallery ==
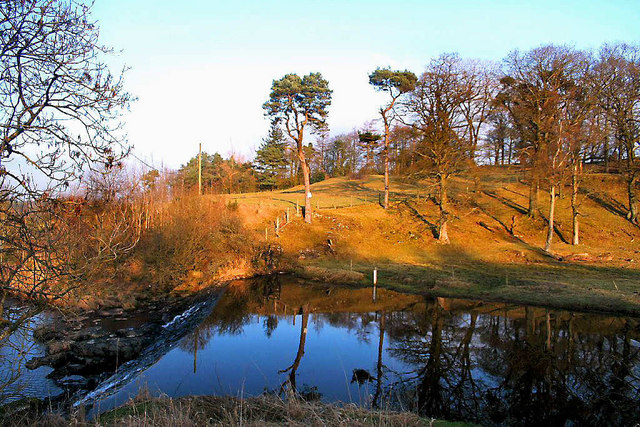
A weir on White Cart Water

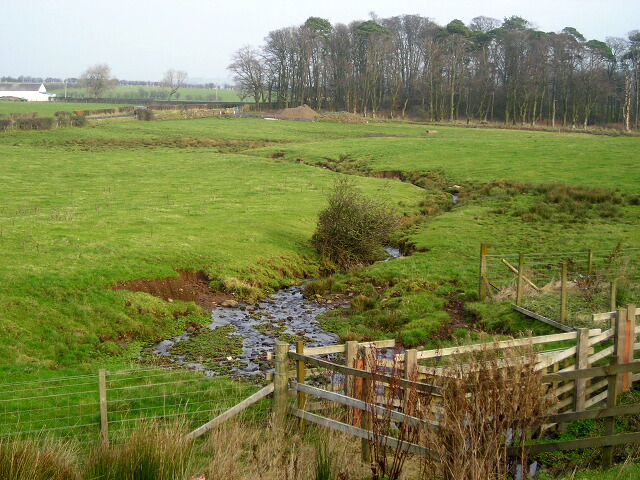
Brackenrig Burn

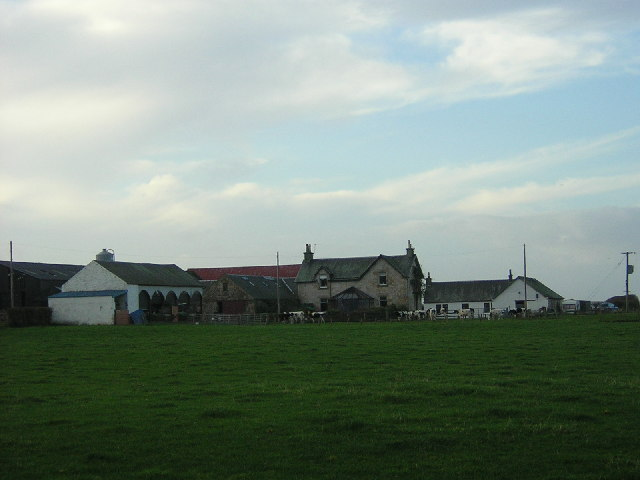
Floors Farm near Waterfoot
