= 1995 East Renfrewshire Council election =

1995 Scottish local government election

- 6 April 1995

All 20 seats to East Renfrewshire Council 11 seats needed for a majority
| | First party | Second party |
|---|---|---|
| Party | Conservative | Labour |
| Seats won | 9 | 8 |
| Popular vote | 9,505 | 10,205 |
| Percentage | 29.2% | 31.4% |
| | Third party | Fourth party |
| Party | Liberal Democrats | RA |
| Seats won | 2 | 1 |
| Popular vote | 4,857 | 1,937 |
| Percentage | 14.9% | 5.9% |
- Results by ward
Elected Council Leader
No overall control

Elections to East Renfrewshire Council were held on 6 April 1995 and were the first for the newly formed Unitary authority for East Renfrewshire Council, which was created under the Local Government etc (Scotland) Act 1994. They resulted in the council falling under no overall control.

East Renfrewshire is one of 32 council areas of Scotland. The East Renfrewshire Council was established pursuant to the Local Government etc (Scotland) Act of 1994 from the previous Eastwood District and part of Renfrew District and elections were held in 1995.

After the election, a coalition was formed between Labour, the Liberal Democrats and Residents Association councilor Pearce.

== Aggregate results ==
East Renfrewshire Council election, 1995
| Party | Seats | Gains | Losses | Net gain/loss | Seats % | Votes % | Votes | +/− |
|---|---|---|---|---|---|---|---|---|
| Conservative | 9 | | | | 45.0 | 29.13 | 9,505 | |
| Labour | 8 | | | | 40.0 | 31.28 | 10,205 | |
| Liberal Democrats | 2 | | | | 10.0 | 14.89 | 4,857 | |
| Residents | 1 | | | | 5.0 | 5.94 | 1,937 | |
| SNP | 0 | | | | 0.0 | 17.91 | 5,843 | |
| Independent | 0 | | | | 0.0 | 0.76 | 248 | |
| Green | 0 | | | | 0.0 | 0.09 | 29 | |

== Ward results ==
Thornliebank
| Party | Candidate | Votes | % |
|---|---|---|---|
| Labour | Jim Fletcher | 1,101 | 65.6 |
| Conservative | N. Deerey | 346 | 20.6 |
| SNP | J. Graham | 232 | 13.8 |
| Total votes | | 1,679 | 53.3 |
| Majority | | 755 | 45.0 |

Giffnock North
| Party | Candidate | Votes | % |
|---|---|---|---|
| Liberal Democrats | Allan Mackie | 687 | 43.8 |
| Conservative | J Addison | 647 | 41.2 |
| SNP | M Weatherill | 236 | 15.0 |
| Majority | | 40 | 2.6 |

Giffnock South
| Party | Candidate | Votes | % |
|---|---|---|---|
| Conservative | J Shaw | 883 | 57.4 |
| Liberal Democrats | B Fishman | 432 | 28.1 |
| SNP | J Findlay | 224 | 14.6 |
| Majority | | 451 | 29.3 |

Merrylee Park
| Party | Candidate | Votes | % |
|---|---|---|---|
| Liberal Democrats | Allan Steele | 1,379 | 80.8 |
| Conservative | Richard Cook | 327 | 19.2 |
| Majority | | 1,052 | 61.6 |

Netherlee
| Party | Candidate | Votes | % |
|---|---|---|---|
| Residents | I Pearce | 1,457 | 81.1 |
| SNP | Alistair Carmichael | 340 | 18.9 |
| Majority | | 1,117 | 18.9 |

Stamperland
| Party | Candidate | Votes | % |
|---|---|---|---|
| Labour | Mary Montague | 697 | 44.5 |
| Conservative | I Simpson | 399 | 25.4 |
| SNP | O Adiar | 358 | 22.8 |
| Liberal Democrats | E Ward | 114 | 7.3 |
| Majority | | 296 | 19.1 |

Williamwood
| Party | Candidate | Votes | % |
|---|---|---|---|
| Conservative | G MacDonald | 741 | 43.2 |
| Labour | J Hillhouse | 420 | 24.5 |
| Liberal Democrats | V Fossett | 311 | 18.1 |
| SNP | I Cartlidge | 244 | 14.2 |
| Majority | | 321 | 18.7 |

Clarkston
| Party | Candidate | Votes | % |
|---|---|---|---|
| Conservative | F McGee | 614 | 35.8 |
| Labour | Ms M Bell | 415 | 24.2 |
| SNP | D Beattie | 377 | 22.0 |
| Liberal Democrats | D Oattes | 308 | 18.0 |
| Majority | | 199 | 11.6 |

Busby
| Party | Candidate | Votes | % |
|---|---|---|---|
| Labour | Alan Laferty | 735 | 49.9 |
| Residents | Stuart Miller | 480 | 32.6 |
| SNP | M McKendry | 229 | 15.5 |
| Green | M Wilson | 29 | 2.0 |
| Majority | | 255 | 17.4 |

Eaglesham
| Party | Candidate | Votes | % |
|---|---|---|---|
| Conservative | BJ Baird | 756 | 42.3 |
| Labour | W Wilde | 610 | 34.1 |
| SNP | Ms E Mackenzie | 421 | 23.6 |
| Majority | | 146 | 8.2 |

Greenfarm
| Party | Candidate | Votes | % |
|---|---|---|---|
| Conservative | J Gilbert | 467 | 43.9 |
| Liberal Democrats | Ms H Rae | 363 | 34.1 |
| SNP | J McBride | 223 | 21.9 |
| Majority | | 104 | 9.8 |

Crookfur
| Party | Candidate | Votes | % |
|---|---|---|---|
| Conservative | Leslie Rosin | 700 | 47.7 |
| Liberal Democrats | Alan Rennie | 306 | 20.8 |
| Labour | Brian Friel | 227 | 18.9 |
| SNP | D Edwards | 164 | 12.2 |
| Independent | Dr. Manar Tayan | 21 | 1.4 |
| Majority | | 394 | 26.9 |

Broom
| Party | Candidate | Votes | % |
|---|---|---|---|
| Conservative | Barbra Grant | 1,059 | 74.3 |
| Liberal Democrats | G Stewart | 366 | 25.7 |
| Majority | | 693 | 48.6 |

Kirkhill
| Party | Candidate | Votes | % |
|---|---|---|---|
| Conservative | Ian Drysdale | 997 | 71.5 |
| Liberal Democrats | D Forrester | 398 | 28.5 |
| Majority | | 599 | 43.0 |

Mearns
| Party | Candidate | Votes | % |
|---|---|---|---|
| Conservative | Ian Hutchinson | 621 | 46.9 |
| Labour | Robert Mcintyre | 481 | 36.3 |
| SNP | J Stewart | 223 | 16.8 |
| Majority | | 140 | 10.6 |
