= 2012 East Renfrewshire Council election =

2012 Scottish local government election

← 2007	3 May 2012	2017 →

All 20 seats to East Renfrewshire Council 11 seats needed for a majority

	First party	Second party	Third party
Leader	Jim Fletcher	Jim Swift	Tony Buchanan
Party	Labour	Conservative	SNP
Leader's seat	Giffnock and Thornliebank	Newton Mearns South	Neilston, Uplawmoor and Newton Mearns North
Last election	7 seats, 35.0%	7 seats, 35%	3 seats, 15%
Seats before	7	7	3
Seats won	8	6	4
Seat change	▲1	▼1	▲1
Popular vote	10,228	9,757	6,521
Percentage	31.1%	29.7%	19.8%
	Fourth party	Fifth party
Leader	Danny Devlin	Alex Mackie
Party	Independent	Liberal Democrats
Leader's seat	Barrhead	Giffnock and Thornliebank defeated
Last election	2 seats, 10%	1 seat, 5%
Seats before	2	1
Seats won	2	0
Seat change	0	▼1
Popular vote	4,906	1,128
Percentage	14.9%	3.4%
- The 6 multi-member wards
Council Leader before election
Jim Fletcher
Labour
Council Leader after election
Jim Fletcher
Labour

The 2012 East Renfrewshire Council election took place on 3 May 2012 to elect members of East Renfrewshire Council. The election used the six wards created as a result of the Local Governance (Scotland) Act 2004, with each ward electing three or four Councillors using the single transferable vote system form of proportional representation, with 20 Councillors being elected.

The election saw Labour gain 1 seat while also increasing their vote share. The Scottish Conservative and Unionist Party lost 1 seat and saw their vote share fall as they now become the second largest party on the Council. The Scottish National Party gained 1 seat to increase their numbers to 4 and remained the third largest party. Independents retained their 2 seats while the Scottish Liberal Democrats were wiped out again losing their single seat on the authority.

Following the election the Labour Party formed a Coalition with SNP and the Independent Danny Devlin. This was in effect a continuation of the previous Labour - SNP - Independent - Lib Dem coalition administration which had existed before 2012.

== Election result ==
East Renfrewshire local election result 2012
Party	Seats	Gains	Losses	Net gain/loss	Seats %	Votes %	Votes	+/−
Labour	8	1	0	+1	40.0	31.11	10,228	+3.31
Conservative	6	0	1	-1	30.0	29.68	9,757	-4.72
SNP	4	1	0	+1	20.0	19.84	6,521	+3.84
Independent	2	-	-	-	10.0	14.92	4,906	+4.12
Liberal Democrats	0	0	1	-1	0.0	3.43	1,128	-6.77
Green	0	-	-	-	-	0.85	278	+0.25
UKIP	0	-	-	-	-	0.17	56	New

Note: "Votes" are the first preference votes. The net gain/loss and percentage changes relate to the result of the previous Scottish local elections on 3 May 2007. This may differ from other published sources showing gain/loss relative to seats held at dissolution of Scotland's councils.

== Ward results ==
=== Neilston, Uplawmoor and Newton Mearns North ===
- 2007: 2xCon; 1xLab; 1xSNP
- 2012: 2xLab; 1xCon; 1xSNP
- 2007-2012: Lab gain one seat from Con

Neilston, Uplawmoor and Newton Mearns North - 4 seats
Party	Candidate	FPv%	Count							
Party	Candidate	FPv%	1	2	3	4	5	6	7	8
Conservative	Charlie Gilbert (incumbent)	23.26	1,417							
SNP	Tony Buchanan (incumbent)	17.34	1,052	1,059	1,075	1,090	1,294			
Labour	Elaine Green (incumbent)	18.11	1,099	1,113	1,122	1,150	1,164	1,179	1,246	
Labour	Paul O'Kane	17.11	1,038	1,043	1,059	1,077	1,086	1,095	1,140	1,165
Conservative	Leslie Rosin (incumbent)	10.55	640	773	784	817	827	831	901	902
Green	Grace McCarthy	4.58	278	289	327	372	395	411		
SNP	Frank Rankin	4.10	249	252	262	272				
Liberal Democrats	Roy Provan	2.51	152	162	180					
Independent	Graham Williamson	2.34	142	148						

=== Barrhead ===
- 2007: 2xLab; 1xIndependent; 1xSNP
- 2012: 2xLab; 1xIndependent; 1xSNP
- 2007-2012: No change

Barrhead - 4 seats
Party	Candidate	FPv%	Count					
Party	Candidate	FPv%	1	2	3	4	5	6
Independent	Danny Devlin (incumbent)	28.79	1,741					
Labour	Betty Cunningham (incumbent)	23.43	1,417					
Labour	Kenny Hay	10.40	629	726	874	880	923	1,064
SNP	Tommy Reilly	11.84	716	799	813	819	854	964
SNP	Douglas Yates	11.84	716	776	783	787	824	927
Independent	Eddie Phillips	7.09	429	563	574	589	692	
Conservative	Tariq Parvez	5.69	344	373	377	395		
UKIP	Sarah-Louise Hemy	0.93	56	70	72			

=== Giffnock and Thornliebank ===
- 2007: 1xLab; 1xCon; 1xLib Dem
- 2012: 1xLab; 1xCon; 1xSNP
- 2007-2012: SNP gain one seat from Lib Dem

Giffnock and Thornliebank - 3 seats
Party	Candidate	FPv%	Count		
Party	Candidate	FPv%	1	2	3
Labour	Jim Fletcher (incumbent)	35.53	1,935		
Conservative	Gordon Wallace (incumbent)	21.36	1,163	1,207	1,398
SNP	Vincent Waters	19.89	1,083	1,209	1,375
Independent	Hugh Moore	11.84	645	751	994
Liberal Democrats	Alex Mackie (incumbent)	11.38	620	747	

=== Netherlee, Stamperland and Williamwood ===
- 2007: 1xLab; 1xIndependent; 1xCon
- 2012: 1xLab; 1xIndependent; 1xCon
- 2007-2012: No change

Netherlee, Stamperland and Williamwood - 3 seats
Party	Candidate	FPv%	Count			
Party	Candidate	FPv%	1	2	3	4
Labour	Mary Montague (incumbent)	29.79	1,528			
Independent	Ralph Robertson (incumbent)	29.10	1,493			
Conservative	Gordon McCaskill (incumbent)†	20.51	1,052	1,074	1,141	1,205
SNP	Irene Anderson	18.19	933	1,006	1,064	1,120
Liberal Democrats	Gordon Cochrane	2.42	124	171	198	

=== Newton Mearns South ===
- 2007: 2xCon; 1xLab
- 2012: 2xCon; 1xLab
- 2007-2012: No change

Newton Mearns South - 3 seats
Party	Candidate	FPv%	Count					
Party	Candidate	FPv%	1	2	3	4	5	6
Conservative	Jim Swift (incumbent)	30.23	1,448					
Conservative	Barbara Grant (incumbent)	22.99	1,101	1,186	1,200			
Labour	Ian McAlpine (incumbent)	17.10	819	825	844	844	889	1,115
Conservative	Alistair Haw	10.23	490	626	630	632	709	819
SNP	Frank Angell	12.67	607	613	629	629	684	
Independent	Bryson McNeil	5.07	243	250	268	268		
Liberal Democrats	Anna McCurley	1.71	82	84				

=== Busby, Clarkston and Eaglesham ===
- 2007: 1xLab; 1xCon; 1xSNP
- 2012: 1xLab; 1xSNP; 1xCon
- 2007-2012: No change

Busby, Clarkston and Eaglesham - 3 seats
Party	Candidate	FPv%	Count		
Party	Candidate	FPv%	1	2	3
Labour	Alan Lafferty (incumbent)	32.69	1,763		
SNP	Alastair Carmichael (incumbent)	21.60	1,165	1,275	1,336
Conservative	Stewart Miller (incumbent)	22.68	1,223	1,260	1,301
Conservative	Alec White	16.30	879	890	900
Independent	George Kennedy	3.95	213	278	323
Liberal Democrats	Ritchie Adam	2.78	150	208	

== Post-Election Changes ==
- † Netherlee, Stamperland and Williamwood Conservative Cllr Gordon McCaskill was suspended by the party following comments he made on Twitter about Scotland's First Minister, Nicola Sturgeon, and Islamic State. He has since been reinstated by the Conservative Group.
