= Clarkston, Netherlee and Williamwood (ward) =

Electoral ward in East Renfrewshire, Scotland

Location of the ward

Clarkston, Netherlee and Williamwood is one of the five wards used to elect members of the East Renfrewshire Council. It elects four Councillors. The area covers the town of Clarkston, as well as the villages of Busby and Netherlee, all within East Renfrewshire.

== Councillors ==
Election	Councillors			
2017	David MacDonald (Ind.)	Alan Lafferty (Labour)	Stewart Miller (Conservative /Ind.)	Annette Ireland (SNP)
2020	David MacDonald (Ind.)	Alan Lafferty (Labour)	Stewart Miller (Conservative /Ind.)	Annette Ireland (SNP)
2022	David MacDonald (Ind.)	Katie Victoria Pragnell (Labour)	Kate Campbell (Conservative)	Annette Ireland (SNP)

== Election results ==
=== 2022 election ===
2022 East Renfrewshire Council election: Clarkston, Netherlee and Williamwood - 4 seats
Party	Candidate	FPv%	Count							
Party	Candidate	FPv%	1	2	3	4	5	6	7	8
Conservative	Kate Campbell	17.2%	1,692	1,692	1,694	1,710	2,254			
Conservative	Gerald Edwards	6.3%	622	622	622	627				
SNP	Annette Ireland (incumbent)	21.6%	2,119							
Scottish Green	Gordon Keenan	7.3%	717	737	745	780	787	796	846	
Independent	David Macdonald (incumbent)	14.3%	1,407	1,415	1,425	1,448	1,471	1,541	1,868	2,017
SNP	David Tam McDonald	7.4%	724	838	852	863	864	867	895	1,233
Independent	Stewart Miller (incumbent)	6.4%	624	626	634	656	673	718		
Labour	Katie Victoria Pragnell	16.8%	1,647	1,654	1,657	1,728	1,743	1,798	1,908	2,116
Liberal Democrats	Daphne Vlastari	2.1%	203	204	206					
ISP	Colette Walker	0.6%	57	58						
Electorate: 16,612 Valid: 9,812 Spoilt: 165 (1.6%) Quota: 1,963 Turnout: 60.2%

=== 2017 election ===
2017 East Renfrewshire Council election: Clarkston, Netherlee & Williamwood – 4 seats
Party	Candidate	FPv%	Count									
Party	Candidate	FPv%	1	2	3	4	5	6	7	8	9	10
Conservative	Stewart Miller (Note: Sitting councillor for the Busby, Clarkston and Eaglesham ward which had been abolished.)	16.81%	1,715	1,719	1,734	1,738	1,762	1,772	1,777	1,915	1,936	3,328
Conservative	Andrea McKewon	15.49%	1,580	1,585	1,598	1,604	1,624	1,628	1,634	1,767	1,783	
SNP	Annette Ireland	14.78%	1,508	1,509	1,521	1,634	1,671	2,400				
Independent	David Macdonald††	13.25%	1,352	1,354	1,391	1,439	1,505	1,571	1,659	2,189		
Independent	Ralph Robertson (incumbent) (Note: Sitting councillor for the Netherlee, Stamperland and Williamwood ward which had been redrawn.)	9.75%	995	995	1,012	1,044	1,110	1,126	1,175			
Labour	Alan Lafferty	9.66%	986	989	1,018	1,048	1,536	1,573	1,651	1,791	1,829	1,949
SNP	James Mills	7.93%	809	810	813	883	908					
Labour	Mary Montague (incumbent)	6.78%	692	692	717	761						
Scottish Green	Laura Stevens	3.44%	351	352	378							
Liberal Democrats	Alex Mackie	1.91%	195	195								
UKIP	Sarah Louise Hemy	0.20%	20									
Electorate: TBC Valid: 10,204 Spoilt: 151 Quota: 2,041 Turnout: 63.1%
