= 2017 East Renfrewshire Council election =

Local election within Scotland

- 4 May 2017

All 18 seats to East Renfrewshire Council 10 seats needed for a majority
- Turnout: -->

	First party	Second party
Leader	Jim Swift	Tony Buchanan
Party	Conservative	SNP
Leader's seat	Newton Mearns South & Eaglesham	Newton Mearns North & Neilston
Last election	6	4
Seats won	7	5
Seat change	▲1	▲1
Popular vote	15,588	9,886
Percentage	38.3%	24.3%
	Third party	Fourth party
Leader	Paul O'Kane	N/A
Party	Labour	Independent
Leader's seat	Newton Mearns North & Neilston	N/A
Last election	8	2
Seats won	4	2
Seat change	▼4	0
Popular vote	7,073	6,508
Percentage	17.4%	16.0%
- The 5 multi-member wards
Council Leader before election
Jim Fletcher
Labour
Council Leader after election
Tony Buchanan
SNP

The 2017 East Renfrewshire Council elections took place on 4 May 2017 to elect members of East Renfrewshire Council.

Five wards were used to elect eighteen councillors, a reduction of two from 2012.

After the election, SNP and Labour formed a coalition with independent Danny Devlin.

== 2017 results ==
East Renfrewshire local election result 2017
Party	Seats	Gains	Losses	Net gain/loss	Seats %	Votes %	Votes	+/−
Conservative	7			▲1	38.9	38.3	15,588	▲8.6
SNP	5			▲1	27.8	24.3	9,886	▲4.5
Labour	4			▼4	22.2	17.4	7,073	▼13.7
Independent	2			0	11.1	16.0	6,508	▲1.1
Liberal Democrats	0			0	0.0	2.2	907	▼1.2
Green	0			0	0.0	1.4	571	▲0.6
UKIP	0			0	0.0	0.3	121	New
Scottish Libertarian	0			0	0.0	0.1	32	New
SDP	0			0	0.0	0.0	13	New

Note: "Votes" are the first preference votes. The net gain/loss and percentage changes relate to the result of the previous Scottish local elections on 3 May 2012. This may differ from other published sources showing gain/loss relative to seats held at dissolution of Scotland's councils.

== Ward results ==
=== Barrhead, Liboside & Uplawmoor ===
- 2017: 1 x Independent, 1 x Conservative, 1 x Labour, 1 x SNP
- 2012-2017: New ward

Barrhead, Liboside & Uplawmoor - 4 seats
Party	Candidate	FPv%	Count							
Party	Candidate	FPv%	1	2	3	4	5	6	7	8
Independent	Danny Devlin (incumbent) (Note: Sitting Councillor for the Barrhead ward which had been redrawn.)	26.02%	1,840							
Conservative	Paul Aitken†	18.34%	1,297	1,356	1,372	1,390	1,412	1,427		
SNP	Angela Convery	16.95%	1,199	1,242	1,242	1,330	1,347	1,357	1,358	2,371
SNP	Tommy Reilly (incumbent)	14.97%	1,059	1,125	1,126	1,167	1,205	1,218	1,219	
Labour	Betty Wood Cunningham (incumbent)	14.42%	1,020	1,111	1,113	1,160	1,506			
Labour	Kenny Hay (incumbent)	5.71%	404	463	465	481				
Green	David Allison	3.11%	220	244	249					
UKIP	John Ferguson	0.48%	34	43						
Electorate: TBC Valid: 7,073 Spoilt: 116 Quota: 1,415 Turnout: 52.5%

=== Newton Mearns North & Neilston ===
- 2017: 1 x Conservative, 1 x SNP, 1 x Labour
- 2012-2017: New ward

Newton Mearns North & Neilston - 3 seats
Party	Candidate	FPv%	Count
Party	Candidate	FPv%	1
Conservative	Charlie Gilbert (incumbent) (Note: Sitting councillor for the Neilston, Uplawmoor and Newton Mearns North ward which had been redrawn.)	28.55%	1,729
SNP	Tony Buchanan (incumbent)	25.62%	1,551
Labour Co-op	Paul O'Kane (incumbent)	25.29%	1,531
Conservative	Andrew Morrison	10.17%	616
Independent	Kirsteen Allan	4.44%	269
Independent	David Jesner	2.94%	178
Liberal Democrats	Roy Provan	2.28%	138
UKIP	Stuart Sutherland	0.50%	30
SDP	Robert Malyn	0.21%	13
Electorate: TBC Valid: 6,055 Spoilt: 79 Quota: 1,514 Turnout: 52.8%

=== Giffnock and Thornliebank ===
- 2012: 1 x Labour, 1 x Conservative, 1 x SNP
- 2017: 1 x Labour, 1 x Conservative, 1 x SNP
- 2012-2017: No Change

Giffnock and Thornliebank - 3 seats
Party	Candidate	FPv%	Count								
Party	Candidate	FPv%	1	2	3	4	5	6	7	8	9
SNP	Colm Merrick	24.40%	1,853	1,855	1,860	1,898	1,990				
Conservative	Gordon Wallace (incumbent)	23.06%	1,751	1,753	1,758	1,784	1,825	1,826	2,621		
Labour	Jim Fletcher (incumbent)	18.84%	1,431	1,435	1,438	1,506	1,615	1,650	1,715	1,838	2,224
Conservative	Paul Smith	11.84%	899	904	905	943	976	979			
Independent	Paul Drury	11.31%	859	862	876	913	1,085	1,108	1,149	1,309	
Independent	Savio D'Souza	6.00%	456	460	470	507					
Liberal Democrats	Christopher Park	3.50%	266	274	278						
Independent	Gordon McCaskill *	0.63%	48	50							
Scottish Libertarian	Alan Findlay	0.42%	32								
Electorate: TBC Valid: 7,595 Spoilt: 92 Quota: 1,899 Turnout: 60.2%

=== Clarkston, Netherlee and Williamwood ===
- 2017: 1 x SNP, 1 x Independent, 1 x Conservative, 1 x Labour
- 2012-2017: New ward

Clarkston, Netherlee and Williamwood - 4 seats
Party	Candidate	FPv%	Count									
Party	Candidate	FPv%	1	2	3	4	5	6	7	8	9	10
Conservative	Stewart Miller††	16.81%	1,715	1,719	1,734	1,738	1,762	1,772	1,777	1,915	1,936	3,328
Conservative	Andrea Gee	15.49%	1,580	1,585	1,598	1,604	1,624	1,628	1,634	1,767	1,783	
SNP	Annette Ireland	14.78%	1,508	1,509	1,521	1,634	1,671	2,400				
Independent	David Macdonald	13.25%	1,352	1,354	1,391	1,439	1,505	1,571	1,659	2,189		
Independent	Ralph Robertson (incumbent)	9.75%	995	995	1,012	1,044	1,110	1,126	1,175			
Labour Co-op	Alan Lafferty	9.66%	986	989	1,018	1,048	1,536	1,573	1,651	1,791	1,829	1,949
SNP	James Mills	7.93%	809	810	813	883	908					
Labour Co-op	Mary Montague (incumbent)	6.78%	692	692	717	761						
Green	Laura Stevens	3.44%	351	352	378							
Liberal Democrats	Alex Mackie	1.91%	195	195								
UKIP	Sarah Louise Hemy	0.20%	20									
Electorate: TBC Valid: 10,204 Spoilt: 151 Quota: 2,041 Turnout: 63.1%

=== Newton Mearns South & Eaglesham ===
- 2017: 3 x Conservative, 1 x SNP
- 2012-2017: New ward

Newton Mearns South & Eaglesham - 4 seats
Party	Candidate	FPv%	Count				
Party	Candidate	FPv%	1	2	3	4	5
Conservative	Jim Swift (incumbent) (Note: Sitting councillor for the Newton Mearns South ward which had been redrawn.)	28.30%	2,766				
SNP	Caroline Bamforth	19.51%	1,907	1,920	1,923	1,926	1,982
Conservative	Barbara Grant (incumbent)	18.40%	1,798	2,216			
Conservative	Jim McLean	14.70%	1,437	1,706	1,924	1,936	1,987
Labour Co-op	Ian McAlpine (incumbent)	10.33%	1,009	1,028	1,037	1,043	1,139
Independent	Bev Brown	5.23%	511	545	552	562	620
Liberal Democrats	Alan Rennie	3.15%	308	325	332	333	
UKIP	Gerry McVeigh	0.38%	37	40	41		
Electorate: TBC Valid: 9,773 Spoilt: 115 Quota: 1,955 Turnout: 58.6%

== Changes since 2017 ==
- † Barrhead, Liboside & Uplawmoor Conservative Cllr Paul Aitken resigned from the Scottish Conservative & Unionist party and became an Independent on 22 January 2018.
- †† Clarkston, Netherlee & Williamwood Conservative Cllr Stewart Miller resigned from the Scottish Conservative & Unionist party and became an Independent on 10 September 2020.
