= Barrhead, Liboside and Uplawmoor (ward) =

Ward used to elect members of the East Renfrewshire Council

Location of the ward

Barrhead, Liboside and Uplawmoor is one of the five wards used to elect members of the East Renfrewshire Council. It elects three Councillors.

== Councillors ==
| Election | Councillors | | | |
|---|---|---|---|---|
| 2017 | Angela Convery (SNP) | Betty Wood Cunningham (Labour) | Danny Devlin (Ind.) | Paul Aitken (Conservative /Ind.) |
| 2018 | Angela Convery (SNP) | Betty Wood Cunningham (Labour) | Danny Devlin (Ind.) | Paul Aitken (Conservative /Ind.) |
| 2022 | Angela Convery (SNP) | Betty Wood Cunningham (Labour) | Danny Devlin (Ind.) | Chris Lunday (SNP) |
| 2025 by- | Angela Convery (SNP) | Julie Costello McHale (Labour) | Danny Devlin (Ind.) | Chris Lunday (SNP) |

== Election results ==
=== 2025 by-election ===
Barrhead, Liboside and Uplawmoor by-election (21 August 2025) - 1 seat
| Party | Candidate | FPv% | Count | | | | | |
| Party | Candidate | FPv% | 1 | 2 | 3 | 4 | 5 | 6 |
|---|---|---|---|---|---|---|---|---|
| Labour | Julie Costello McHale | 41.9% | 1,901 | 1,906 | 1,970 | 2,029 | 2,217 | 2,866 |
| SNP | David McDonald | 25.1% | 1,142 | 1,142 | 1,151 | 1,292 | 1,431 | |
| Reform | Andy MacGibbon | 22.4% | 1,018 | 1,022 | 1,076 | 1,089 | | |
| Green | Karen Sharkey | 5.4% | 247 | 252 | 266 | | | |
| Conservative | Farooq Choudury | 4.6% | 207 | 211 | | | | |
| Abolish the Scottish Parliament | Gus Ferguson | 0.6% | 27 | | | | | |
Valid: 4,542 Spoilt: 43 Quota: 2,272 Turnout: 4,585

=== 2022 election ===
2022 East Renfrewshire Council election: Barrhead, Liboside and Uplawmoor - 4 seats
| Party | Candidate | FPv% | Count | | | | | | | |
| Party | Candidate | FPv% | 1 | 2 | 3 | 4 | 5 | 6 | 7 | 8 |
|---|---|---|---|---|---|---|---|---|---|---|
| Independent | Danny Devlin (incumbent) | 26% | 1,753 | | | | | | | |
| SNP | Angela Convery (incumbent) | 24.3% | 1,639 | | | | | | | |
| Labour | Betty Wood Cunningham (incumbent) | 20.1% | 1,355 | | | | | | | |
| Conservative | Greg Turner† | 10.7% | 722 | 760 | 761 | 762 | 767 | 780 | 898 | |
| SNP | Chris Lunday | 9.1% | 616 | 691 | 935 | 936 | 968 | 1,105 | 1,198 | 1,282 |
| Independent | Paul Aitken (incumbent) | 5.1% | 345 | 462 | 470 | 472 | 491 | 536 | | |
| Green | Frank Wilson | 3.4% | 229 | 258 | 272 | 273 | 285 | | | |
| Alba | Neil Anderson | 1.1% | 74 | 91 | 96 | 96 | | | | |
Electorate: 14,485 Valid: 6,733 Spoilt: 133 (1.93%) Quota: 1,347 Turnout: 47.2%

† Greg Turner was suspended from the Conservatives on 21 April 2022, prior to the election, after being linked to derogatory online remarks against Catholics. His name remained on the ballot paper, as the deadline for nominations had passed.

=== 2017 election ===
2017 East Renfrewshire Council election: Barrhead, Liboside and Uplawmoor – 4 seats
| Party | Candidate | FPv% | Count | | | | | | | |
| Party | Candidate | FPv% | 1 | 2 | 3 | 4 | 5 | 6 | 7 | 8 |
|---|---|---|---|---|---|---|---|---|---|---|
| Independent | Danny Devlin (incumbent) (Note: Sitting Councillor for the Barrhead ward which had been redrawn.) | 26.02% | 1,840 | | | | | | | |
| Conservative | Paul Aitken† | 18.34% | 1,297 | 1,356 | 1,372 | 1,390 | 1,412 | 1,427 | | |
| SNP | Angela Convery | 16.95% | 1,199 | 1,242 | 1,242 | 1,330 | 1,347 | 1,357 | 1,358 | 2,371 |
| SNP | Tommy Reilly (incumbent) | 14.97% | 1,059 | 1,125 | 1,126 | 1,167 | 1,205 | 1,218 | 1,219 | |
| Labour | Betty Wood Cunningham (incumbent) | 14.42% | 1,020 | 1,111 | 1,113 | 1,160 | 1,506 | | | |
| Labour | Kenny Hay (incumbent) | 5.71% | 404 | 463 | 465 | 481 | | | | |
| Green | David Allison | 3.11% | 220 | 244 | 249 | | | | | |
| UKIP | John Ferguson | 0.48% | 34 | 43 | | | | | | |
Electorate: TBC Valid: 7,073 Spoilt: 116 Quota: 1,415 Turnout: 52.5%
