= Newton Mearns South and Eaglesham (ward) =

Electoral ward in East Renfrewshire, Scotland

Location of the ward

Newton Mearns South and Eaglesham is one of the five wards used to elect members of the East Renfrewshire Council. It elects three Councillors.

== Councillors ==
| Election | Councillors | | | |
|---|---|---|---|---|
| 2017 | Caroline Bamforth (SNP) | Jim Swift (Conservative) | Barbara Grant (Conservative) | Jim McLean (Conservative) |
| 2022 | Caroline Bamforth (SNP) | Andrew Anderson (Labour) | Paul Edlin (Conservative) | Jim McLean (Conservative) |

== Election results ==
=== 2022 election ===
2022 East Renfrewshire Council election: Newton Mearns South and Eaglesham - 4 seats
| Party | Candidate | FPv% | Count | | | | | | | | |
| Party | Candidate | FPv% | 1 | 2 | 3 | 4 | 5 | 6 | 7 | 8 | 9 |
|---|---|---|---|---|---|---|---|---|---|---|---|
| Labour | Andrew Anderson | 19.1% | 1,831 | 1,938 | | | | | | | |
| SNP | Caroline Bamforth (incumbent) | 24.3% | 2,325 | | | | | | | | |
| Conservative | Paul Edlin | 21.1% | 2,016 | | | | | | | | |
| Conservative | Jim McLean (incumbent) | 16.6% | 1,584 | 1,600 | 1,685 | 1,690 | 1,691 | 1,721 | 1,733 | 1,823 | 2,888 |
| Green | Victoria Palmer-Dyer | 4.8% | 456 | 649 | 650 | 658 | 665 | 688 | 738 | | |
| Scottish Family | Luke Reid | 1.2% | 119 | 123 | 123 | 124 | 133 | | | | |
| Alba | Amer Siddiqui | 1.3% | 120 | 146 | 147 | 147 | 152 | 164 | | | |
| Conservative | Paul Smith | 11.2% | 1,067 | 1,070 | 1,082 | 1,083 | 1,087 | 1,106 | 1,113 | 1,154 | |
| Freedom Alliance (UK) | Mark Niven Turnbull | 0.5% | 44 | 45 | 45 | 46 | | | | | |
Electorate: 18,174 Valid: 9,562 Spoilt: 139 (1.4%) Quota: 1,913 Turnout: 53.1%

=== 2017 election ===
Newton Mearns South and Eaglesham – 4 seats
| Party | Candidate | FPv% | Count | | | | |
| Party | Candidate | FPv% | 1 | 2 | 3 | 4 | 5 |
|---|---|---|---|---|---|---|---|
| Conservative | Jim Swift (incumbent) (Note: Sitting councillor for the Newton Mearns South ward which had been redrawn.) | 28.30% | 2,766 | | | | |
| SNP | Caroline Bamforth | 19.51% | 1,907 | 1,920 | 1,923 | 1,926 | 1,982 |
| Conservative | Barbara Grant (incumbent) | 18.40% | 1,798 | 2,216 | | | |
| Conservative | Jim McLean | 14.70% | 1,437 | 1,706 | 1,924 | 1,936 | 1,987 |
| Labour | Ian McAlpine (incumbent) | 10.33% | 1,009 | 1,208 | 1,307 | 1,043 | 1,139 |
| Independent | Bev Brown | 5.23% | 511 | 545 | 552 | 562 | 620 |
| Liberal Democrats | Alan Rennie | 3.15% | 308 | 325 | 332 | 333 | |
| UKIP | Gerry McVeigh | 0.38% | 37 | 40 | 41 | | |
Electorate: TBC Valid: 9,773 Spoilt: 115 Quota: 1,955 Turnout: 58.6%
