= 2003 East Renfrewshire Council election =

2003 Scottish local government election

- 1 May 2003

All 20 seats to East Renfrewshire Council 11 seats needed for a majority
	First party	Second party
Party	Labour	Conservative
Last election	9	8
Seats won	8	7
Seat change	▼1	▼1
Popular vote	12,370	11,903
Percentage	31.9%	30.7%
	Third party	Fourth party
Party	Liberal Democrats	Independent
Last election	2	1
Seats won	3	2
Seat change	▲1	▲1
Popular vote	8,052	3,321
Percentage	20.7%	8.6%
- Results by ward.
Council Leader before election
No overall control
Elected Council Leader
No overall control

The 2003 East Renfrewshire Council election for the East Renfrewshire Council took place on 1 May 2003, alongside elections to Scotland's various other councils.

== Aggregate results ==
East Renfrewshire Council election, 2003
Party	Seats	Gains	Losses	Net gain/loss	Seats %	Votes %	Votes	+/−
Labour	8					31.9	12,370	
Conservative	7					30.7	11,903	
Liberal Democrats	3					20.7	8,052	
Independent	2					8.6	3,321	
SNP	0				0.0	7.7	2,989	
Firefighters Against Cuts	0				0.0	0.5	176	

== Results by ward (A-Z) ==
An asterisk (*) indicates an incumbent candidate.

Two asterisks (**) indicates an incumbent candidate standing for re-election in a different ward.

Auchenbank
Party	Candidate	Votes	%	±%
Labour	Edward Phillips*	825	60.0	−11.2
Independent	Rita Connelly	315	22.9	N/A
SNP	David Burnet	151	11.0	−13.2
Liberal Democrats	Heather Boklach	43	3.1	N/A
Conservative	Iain Barr	42	3.1	−1.4
Majority		510	37.1	−9.9
Turnout		1376	48.2	−12.7
Labour hold		Swing		

Barrhead Central
Party	Candidate	Votes	%	±%
Labour	Owen Taylor*	859	54.4	−9.5
Independent	James Tyrrell	266	16.8	N/A
SNP	Lorraine McKechnie	219	13.9	−10.8
Conservative	Graeme Campbell	158	10.0	−1.4
Liberal Democrats	John Davis	77	4.9	N/A
Majority		593	37.6	−1.6
Turnout		1579	56.8	−10.6
Labour hold		Swing		

Barrhead East
Party	Candidate	Votes	%	±%
Labour	Betty Cunningham*	896	61.8	−2.2
Independent	Annette Gallacher	235	16.2	N/A
SNP	Vincent McKechnie	184	12.7	−13.8
Conservative	Linda McGee	77	5.3	−4.2
Liberal Democrats	Ian Clarkson	58	4.0	N/A
Majority		661	45.6	+8.1
Turnout		1450	52.2	−8.2
Labour hold		Swing		

Barrhead North
Party	Candidate	Votes	%	±%
Labour	Roy Garscadden*	875	47.9	−6.3
SNP	Thomas Bradley	317	17.4	−6.3
Liberal Democrats	Russell Auld	224	12.3	N/A
Independent	Alice Grieve	210	11.5	N/A
Conservative	Alexander Fordyce	200	11.0	−11.1
Majority		558	30.5	+0.1
Turnout		1826	63.4	−7.2
Labour hold		Swing		

Broom
Party	Candidate	Votes	%	±%
Conservative	Barbara Grant*	1,302	64.6	+0.7
Liberal Democrats	Alan Rennie	376	18.7	+5.3
Labour	David Arthur	336	16.7	+1.9
Majority		926	45.9	−3.2
Turnout		2014	55.7	−15.8
Conservative hold		Swing		

Busby
Party	Candidate	Votes	%	±%
Labour	Alan Lafferty*	1,032	49.4	+0.9
Conservative	Gordon McCaskill	542	26.0	−2.6
Liberal Democrats	Ian MacKay	337	16.1	N/A
Firefighters Against Cuts	Gerard MacMillan	176	8.4	N/A
Majority		490	23.4	+3.6
Turnout		2087	56.5	−10.1
Labour hold		Swing		

Clarkston
Party	Candidate	Votes	%	±%
Conservative	Frank McGee*	768	34.8	−1.9
Labour	Ian McAlpine	739	33.5	+3.6
SNP	John Robertson	359	16.3	−1.3
Liberal Democrats	David Oattes	340	15.4	−0.4
Majority		29	1.3	−5.6
Turnout		2206	62.0	−11.0
Conservative hold		Swing		

Crookfur
Party	Candidate	Votes	%	±%
Conservative	Leslie Roslin*	918	47.4	−2.4
Labour	Asifa Hussain	383	19.8	−1.9
SNP	Gordon Ford	320	16.5	+1.7
Liberal Democrats	David Scott	314	16.2	+4.5
Majority		535	27.6	−0.5
Turnout		1935	52.3	−15.1
Conservative hold		Swing		

Eaglesham
Party	Candidate	Votes	%	±%
Liberal Democrats	George Napier*	1,023	52.9	+17.8
Conservative	Margaret MacDonald	562	29.1	+1.7
Labour	Ian Fulton	348	18.0	−3.5
Majority		461	23.8	+16.2
Turnout		1933	53.4	−10.7
Liberal Democrats hold		Swing		

Giffnock North
Party	Candidate	Votes	%	±%
Liberal Democrats	Alexander Mackie	914	41.9	+3.8
Conservative	Laurence Haniford	789	36.2	−5.1
Labour	Edwina Phillips	479	22.0	N/A
Majority		125	5.7	+2.5
Turnout		2182	61.1	−9.4
Liberal Democrats gain from Conservative		Swing		

Giffnock South
Party	Candidate	Votes	%	±%
Conservative	James Shaw*	1,095	49.2	+1.5
Labour	Marie Rooney	627	28.2	+5.3
Liberal Democrats	Bernard Fishman	503	22.6	+7.8
Majority		468	21.0	−3.8
Turnout		2225	62.2	−10.5
Conservative hold		Swing		

Greenfarm
Party	Candidate	Votes	%	±%
Conservative	Charlie Gilbert*	972	50.9	+9.7
Labour	Nasim Khan	548	28.7	+1.3
Liberal Democrats	David Raskin	389	20.4	+9.6
Majority		424	22.2	+8.4
Turnout		1909	59.2	−4.5
Conservative hold		Swing		

Kirkhill
Party	Candidate	Votes	%	±%
Conservative	Iain Drysdale*	1,215	59.7	+4.2
Labour	Irene Yona	442	21.7	+0.2
Liberal Democrats	Howard Brodie	377	18.5	+6.0
Majority		773	38.0	+4.0
Turnout		2034	60.9	−6.5
Conservative hold		Swing		

Liboside
Party	Candidate	Votes	%	±%
Labour	Daniel Collins*	897	49.7	−1.7
SNP	Neil McIntyre	381	21.1	−6.6
Conservative	Bernard Thompson	274	15.2	−5.6
Liberal Democrats	Winifred Orr	252	14.0	N/A
Majority		516	28.6	+4.9
Turnout		1804	56.6	−13.1
Labour hold		Swing		

Mearns
Party	Candidate	Votes	%	±%
Conservative	Ian Hutchison*	873	46.7	−3.7
Labour	Ian Meth	432	23.1	−0.7
Liberal Democrats	David Maude	339	18.1	N/A
Independent	Ella Rae	226	12.1	+0.8
Majority		441	23.6	−3.0
Turnout		1870	62.3	−0.8
Conservative hold		Swing		

Merrylea Park
Party	Candidate	Votes	%	±%
Liberal Democrats	Allan Steele*	1,383	63.5	−3.1
Conservative	Susan Goldberg	591	27.1	+4.5
Labour	Anne Dean	203	9.3	N/A
Majority		792	36.4	−7.6
Turnout		2177	60.3	−9.8
Liberal Democrats hold		Swing		

Netherlee
Party	Candidate	Votes	%	±%
Independent	Ian Pearce*	1,252	55.2	+1.4
Conservative	Margaret Corrie	496	21.9	−5.9
SNP	Alastair Carmichael	263	11.6	+1.3
Liberal Democrats	Robert Rigby	258	11.4	+3.3
Majority		756	33.3	+7.3
Turnout		2269	63.8	−11.8
Independent hold		Swing		

North Neilston & West Arthurlie
Party	Candidate	Votes	%	±%
Independent	Danny Devlin	817	45.4	N/A
Labour	Ian Forbes*	577	32.1	−21.0
SNP	Kenneth Darroch	192	10.7	−20.2
Conservative	Alexander Kelly	139	7.7	−8.3
Liberal Democrats	Gordon Cochrane	73	4.1	N/A
Majority		240	13.3	−8.9
Turnout		1798	59.9	−2.3
Independent gain from Labour		Swing		

Stamperland
Party	Candidate	Votes	%	±%
Labour	Mary Montague*	889	42.5	+6.0
Conservative	Alan Brown	495	23.7	+2.0
Liberal Democrats	Fiona Brodie	411	19.7	−2.8
SNP	Oliver Adair	295	14.1	−5.3
Majority		394	18.8	+4.8
Turnout		2090	59.4	−12.8
Labour hold		Swing		

Thornliebank
Party	Candidate	Votes	%	±%
Labour	James Fletcher*	983	48.0	−6.2
Conservative	Deborah Grant	395	19.3	−7.7
Liberal Democrats	Anne Cowieson	361	17.6	N/A
SNP	Leo McCann	308	15.0	−3.8
Majority		588	28.7	+1.5
Turnout		2047	58.1	−8.9
Labour hold		Swing		
