= East Renfrewshire =

Council area of Scotland

East Renfrewshire: Siorrachd Rinn Friù an Ear (Scottish Gaelic); Aest Renfrewshire (Scots)
- Council area
- East Renfrewshire shown within Scotland
- Coordinates: 55.7984°N 4.2907°W
- Sovereign state: United Kingdom
- Country: Scotland
- Lieutenancy area: Renfrewshire
- Unitary authority: 1 April 1996
- Administrative HQ: Giffnock

Government
  - Type: Council
  - Body: East Renfrewshire Council
  - Control: No overall control
  - MPs: Blair McDougall (L)
  - MSPs: 2 MSPs: Kirsten Oswald (SNP); Tom Arthur (SNP)

Area
  - Total: 67 sq mi (174 km^{2})
  - Rank: 28th

Population (2025)
  - Total: 99,840
  - Rank: 23rd
  - Density: 1,480/sq mi (573/km^{2})
- Time zone: UTC+0 (GMT)
  - Summer (DST): UTC+1 (BST)
- ISO 3166 code: GB-ERW
- GSS code: S12000011
- Website: eastrenfrewshire.gov.uk

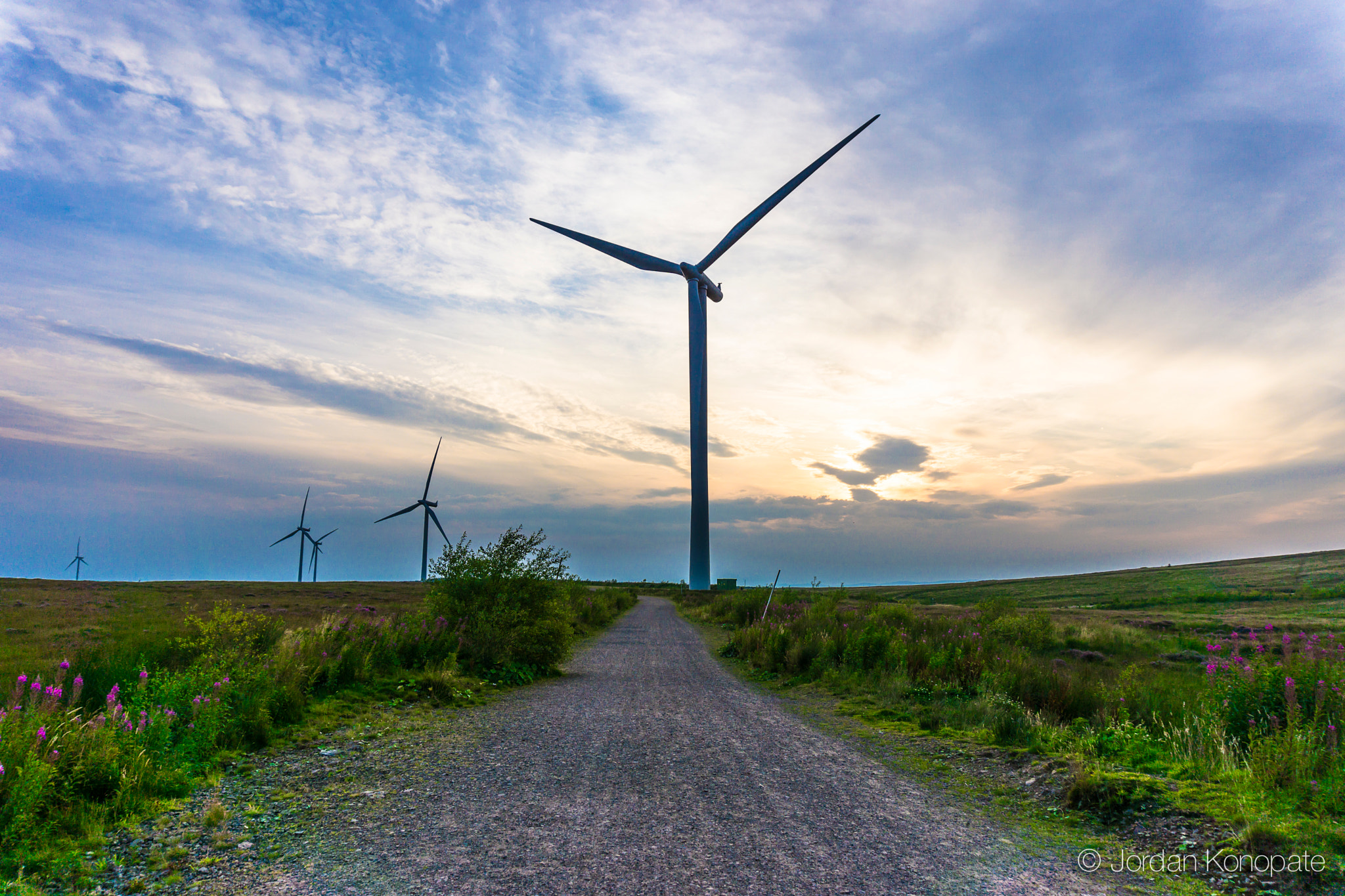
Whitelee Windfarm

East Renfrewshire (Scots: Aest Renfrewshire; Scottish Gaelic: Siorrachd Rinn Friù an Ear) is one of 32 council areas of Scotland. It was formed in 1996, as a successor to the Eastwood district of the Strathclyde region.

Clockwise, East Renfrewshire borders Glasgow to the northeast, South Lanarkshire to the southeast, East Ayrshire to the southwest, North Ayrshire to the west and Renfrewshire to the northwest. Many of the council area's northern settlements fall into the Greater Glasgow urban area.

Until 1975, the council area formed part of the county of Renfrewshire for local government purposes along with the modern council areas of Renfrewshire and Inverclyde. These three council areas together still form a single lieutenancy area called Renfrewshire.

== History ==
East Renfrewshire was created in 1996 under the Local Government etc. (Scotland) Act 1994, which replaced Scotland's previous local government structure of upper-tier regions and lower-tier districts with unitary council areas providing all local government services. East Renfrewshire covered the whole of the abolished Eastwood district and part of Renfrew district, being the Barrhead electoral division, which roughly corresponded to the pre-1975 burgh of Barrhead and parish of Neilston, both lying in the valley of the Levern Water. The new council also took over the functions of the abolished Strathclyde Regional Council within the area.

The area's name references its location within the historic county of Renfrewshire, which had been abolished for local government purposes in 1975 when Eastwood district and Strathclyde region had been created. East Renfrewshire forms part of the Renfrewshire lieutenancy.

The area that is now East Renfrewshire has been inhabited since prehistoric times. At Dunwan Hill near Eaglesham and at Duncarnock near Newton Mearns there were Iron Age hill forts, both thought to have been occupied between around 1200 BC and 400 AD. Ruins of a village, around 2000 years old at the time, were discovered in the early 1800s in the area now occupied by Overlee Playing Fields in Clarkston, but were destroyed as no significance was given to them at the time. There was also evidence of an early castle at the Beechgrove Park in nearby Netherlee.

During the Industrial Revolution the Levern Valley became a centre for the textiles industry, with several mills being established in Neilston and Barrhead.

Giffnock initially grew to house the workers at Giffnock Quarries, which opened in 1835. The honey-coloured stone from Giffnock was used at Glasgow University and Glasgow Central station among many other buildings. Following the development of the railways in the mid-nineteenth century, the parts of the area close to Glasgow became increasingly suburban in character.

In 1941 during the Second World War, Rudolf Hess, one of Adolf Hitler's top deputies within the Nazi Party, parachuted into Floors Farm, near the village of Waterfoot, on a secret mission to meet the Duke of Hamilton and Brandon for peace negotiations. The botched landing led to his capture and arrest. He was held in Scotland until the Nuremburg Trials, where he was convicted and imprisoned in Germany until his death by suicide in 1987.

In 1971 a gas explosion at a parade of shops in the centre of Clarkston killed 22 people and injured more than 100.

In a 2007 Reader's Digest poll, East Renfrewshire was voted the second best place in Britain to raise a family, ranking just behind East Dunbartonshire to the north of Glasgow.

In January 2008, East Renfrewshire became the first Scottish local authority to create a Facebook page to publicise its services.

== Geography ==
East Renfrewshire covers an area to the south and south-west of Glasgow. Many of the district's settlements are classed as part of the Greater Glasgow urban area for statistical purposes. The largest of these, in terms of population, are Newton Mearns, Barrhead, Giffnock and Clarkston. The area becomes more rural away from the Glasgow urban area with areas of moorland and numerous small lochs, many of which have been turned into reservoirs. The moors include part of the Whitelee Wind Farm.

The area is divided into eleven community council areas, all of which have community councils:

- Barrhead
- Broom, Kirkhill and Mearnskirk
- Busby
- Clarkston
- Crookfur, Greenfarm and Mearns Village
- Eaglesham and Waterfoot
- Giffnock
- Neilston
- Netherlee and Stamperland
- Thornliebank
- Uplawmoor

== Demography ==
=== Languages ===
The 2022 Scottish Census reported that out of residents aged three and over, 21,189 (22.5%) considered themselves able to speak or read the Scots language, and 869 (0.9%) considered themselves able to speak or read Gaelic.

=== Religion ===
A 2011 survey showed that 41% of Scotland's Jewish population live in East Renfrewshire, making up 1.6% of the area's population in the 2022 census. In the census, "no religion" was the most selected religious option, with 38% of residents. 21% were Church of Scotland and 20.6% Roman Catholic, with 3.9% other Christians. 5.5% were Muslims. 6.9% did not state a religion.

== Localities ==
The largest localities in East Renfrewshire.

Largest localities by population

Settlement	Population (2020)
Newton Mearns	28,210
Barrhead	17,890
Giffnock	12,250
Clarkston	9,800
Neilston	5,170
Netherlee	4,530
Thornliebank	4,170
Stamperland	3,630
Eaglesham	3,470
Busby	3,310

== Economy ==
East Renfrewshire is home to many small to medium businesses. The interests of these businesses are looked after by the East Renfrewshire Chamber of Commerce.

The local newspapers are the Barrhead News, covering the local authority with emphasis on the western half of the area, which primarily includes the town of Barrhead and the villages of Neilston and Uplawmoor, and the Glasgow South and Eastwood Extra, which is delivered free to homes and businesses, which has its emphasis on the eastern half of the local authority, but also covers news across the western half as well as the south of Glasgow.

== Accidents and disasters ==
In 1971, the Clarkston explosion, a gas leak explosion, occurred in a row of shops on the main street of Clarkston causing the death of 22. A memorial plaque is placed near the site of the explosion.

== Governance ==
East Renfrewshire Council Comhairle Siorrachd Rinn Friù an Ear

Type
- Type: Unitary authority

Leadership
- Provost: Mary Montague, Labour since 25 May 2022
- Leader: Owen O'Donnell, Labour since 25 May 2022
- Chief Executive: Steven Quinn since July 2023

Structure
- Seats: 18 councillors
- Graph of the party split among 18 seats.
- Political groups: Administration (6) Labour (5) Independent (1) Other parties (12) SNP (6) Conservative (5) Independent (1)
- Length of term: 5 years

Elections
- Voting system: Single transferable vote
- Last election: 5 May 2022
- Next election: 6 May 2027

Meeting place
- Eastwood Park, Rouken Glen Road, Giffnock, G46 6UG

Website
- www.eastrenfrewshire.gov.uk

=== Political control ===
The council has been under no overall control from its creation in 1996. Following the 2022 election a minority administration of Labour plus one of the independent councillors formed to run the council.

The first election to East Renfrewshire Council was held in 1995, initially operating as a shadow authority alongside the outgoing authorities until the new system came into force on 1 April 1996. Political control of the council since 1996 has been as follows:

Party in control	Years
No overall control	1996–present

=== Leadership ===
The role of provost is largely ceremonial in East Renfrewshire. They chair full council meetings and act as the council's civic figurehead. Political leadership is provided by the leader of the council. The first leader of the council, Owen Taylor, was formerly leader of Renfrew District Council, one of the council's predecessors. The leaders of East Renfrewshire Council since 1996 have been:

Councillor	Party	From	To
Owen Taylor	Labour	1 Apr 1996	Dec 2004
Jim Fletcher	Labour	Dec 2004	May 2017
Tony Buchanan	SNP	24 May 2017	May 2022
Owen O'Donnell	Labour	25 May 2022	

=== Composition ===
Following the 2022 election and subsequent by-elections and changes of allegiance up to July 2026, the composition of the council was:

Party	Seats
SNP	6
Conservative	5
Labour	5
Independent	2
Total	18

The next election is due in 2027.

=== Premises ===
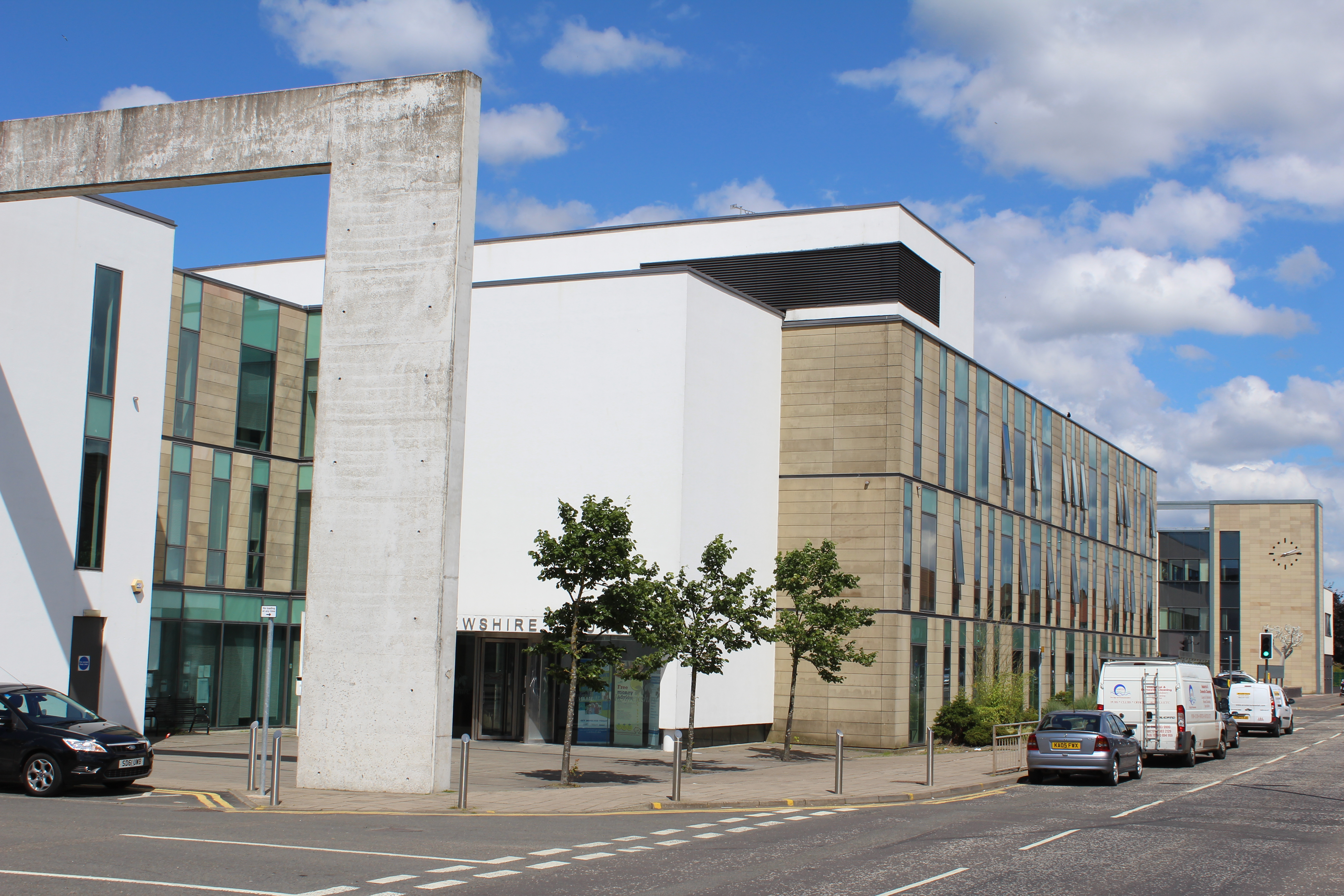
The council's customer service centre at 211 Main Street, Barrhead

The council has its headquarters at Eastwood Park on Rouken Glen Road in Giffnock, in a building which was completed in 1980 for the former Eastwood District Council.

The council also has an office and customer service centre at 211 Main Street in Barrhead, built in 2003.

== Elections ==
Since 2007 elections have been held every five years under the single transferable vote system, introduced by the Local Governance (Scotland) Act 2004. Election results since 1995 have been as follows:

Year	Seats	SNP	Conservative	Labour	Liberal Democrats	Independent / Other	Notes
1995	20	0	9	8	2	1	Labour / Lib Dem coalition
1999	20	0	8	9	2	1	New ward boundaries.
2003	20	0	7	8	3	2	
2007	20	3	7	7	1	2	New ward boundaries.
2012	20	4	6	8	0	2	Labour / Independent / SNP coalition
2017	18	5	7	4	0	2	New ward boundaries. SNP / Labour / Independent coalition
2022	18	6	5	5	0	2	Labour / Independent minority

=== Wards ===
Map of the area's wards (2017 configuration)

Six multi-member wards (20 seats) were created for the 2007 election, replacing 20 single-member wards which had been in place since the creation of the council in 1995. This representation decreased to 18 seats across five renamed and redrawn wards for the 2017 election:

Ward number	Ward	Location	Seats
1	Barrhead, Liboside and Uplawmoor		4
2	Newton Mearns North and Neilston		3
3	Giffnock and Thornliebank		3
4	Clarkston, Netherlee and Williamwood		4
5	Newton Mearns South and Eaglesham		4

== See also ==
- List of places in East Renfrewshire
- List of castles in East Renfrewshire
- List of listed buildings in East Renfrewshire
- List of Category A listed buildings in East Renfrewshire
- Scheduled monuments in East Renfrewshire
- East Renfrewshire Council elections
- Wards of Renfrewshire
- NHS Greater Glasgow and Clyde
- Greater Glasgow
- East Renfrewshire (constituency)
- Renfrewshire West and Levern Valley
- Renfrewshire North and Cardonald
- Eastwood (Scottish Parliament constituency)
- Renfrewshire South (abolished)
- West Scotland (Scottish Parliament electoral region)
- Renfrewshire
- Inverclyde
- Eastwood, Strathclyde
- Renfrew (district)
- Strathclyde
- Renfrewshire (historic)
- Subdivisions of Scotland
