= External Affairs Directorate =

The External Affairs Directorate is a directorate of the Scottish Government, responsible for all aspects of Scotland's external affairs and international relationships with other countries and governments.

== Membership ==
=== Cabinet Secretaries ===
- Angus Robertson, Cabinet Secretary for the Constitution, External Affairs and Culture
- Jenny Gilruth, Minister for Culture, Europe and International Development

=== Management of the directorate ===
- Ken Thomson, Director-General Constitution and External Affairs
- Scott Wightman, Director, External Affairs

== See also ==
- Scottish Government
- Directorates of the Scottish Government
