= Cabinet Secretary for the Constitution, Europe and External Affairs =

Scottish cabinet position

Cabinet Secretary for the Constitution, Europe, and External Affairs
- Scottish Gaelic: Rùnaire a’ Chaibineit airson Bun-reachd, Cùisean Taobh A-muigh agus Cultar
- Incumbent; Office not in use
- Scottish Government; Scottish Cabinet
- Style: Cabinet Secretary (within parliament); Constitution Secretary (informal); Scottish Constitution Secretary (outwith Scotland)
- Member of: Scottish Parliament; Scottish Cabinet
- Reports to: Scottish Parliament
- Seat: Edinburgh
- Appointer: First Minister of Scotland
- Inaugural holder: Michael Russell Minister for UK Negotiations on Scotland's Place in Europe
- Salary: £118,511 per annum (2023) (including £67,662 MSP salary)
- Website: www.gov.scot

The Cabinet Secretary for the Constitution, External Affairs and Culture (Scottish Gaelic: Rùnaire a’ Chaibineit airson Bun-reachd, Cùisean Taobh A-muigh agus Cultar), commonly referred to as the Constitution Secretary (Scottish Gaelic: Rùnaire a’ Bhun-reachd), was a cabinet position in the Scottish Government. In May 2021 the role also gained responsibility for culture, becoming the new position of Cabinet Secretary for the Constitution, External Affairs and Culture.

The Cabinet Secretary was supported by the Minister for Culture, Europe and International Development.

== History ==
The United Kingdom European Union membership referendum took place on 23 June 2016. This position was established (initially as "Minister for UK Negotiations on Scotland's Place in Europe") so that the Scottish government would be involved in the development of the UK government's position before the Prime Minister triggered Article 50.

During a Scottish Government reshuffle in June 2018, the post was promoted to the Cabinet and renamed Cabinet Secretary for Government Business and Constitutional Relations. It was further renamed to Cabinet Secretary for the Constitution, Europe and External Affairs in February 2020.

== Overview ==
=== Responsibilities ===
The responsibilities of the Cabinet Secretary for the Constitution, Europe and External Affairs included:

- independence
- cross-government co-ordination of European and external relations
- policy in relation to UK's exit from the EU
- post-Brexit relations
- migration
- Scottish diaspora
- Global Affairs Network
- Scottish Cities of Refuge
- New Scot strategy
- Registers of Scotland
- British Irish Council
- Royal and ceremonial

== List of office holders ==
=== Minister for UK Negotiations on Scotland's Place in Europe ===
Name	Portrait	Entered office	Left office	Party	First Minister
Mike Russell		26 August 2016	26 June 2018	Scottish National Party	Nicola Sturgeon
=== Cabinet Secretary for Government Business and Constitutional Relations ===
Mike Russell		26 June 2018	17 February 2020	Scottish National Party	Nicola Sturgeon
=== Cabinet Secretary for the Constitution, Europe and External Affairs ===
Mike Russell		17 February 2020	20 May 2021	Scottish National Party	Nicola Sturgeon
Role merged with culture responsibilities from the Cabinet Secretary for Economy, Fair Work and Culture to become Cabinet Secretary for the Constitution, External Affairs and Culture

== See also ==
- Scottish Parliament
- Scottish Government
- Secretary of State for Exiting the European Union
