= Constitution and External Affairs Directorates =

Directorates of the Scottish Government

The Strategy and External Affairs Directorates are a group of directorates of the Scottish Government, responsible for co-ordinating policy in Scotland relating to constitutional matters, elections and freedom of information, as well as managing Scottish Cabinet businesses, and the legislative programme for Government.

== Composition ==
=== Cabinet Secretaries and Ministers ===
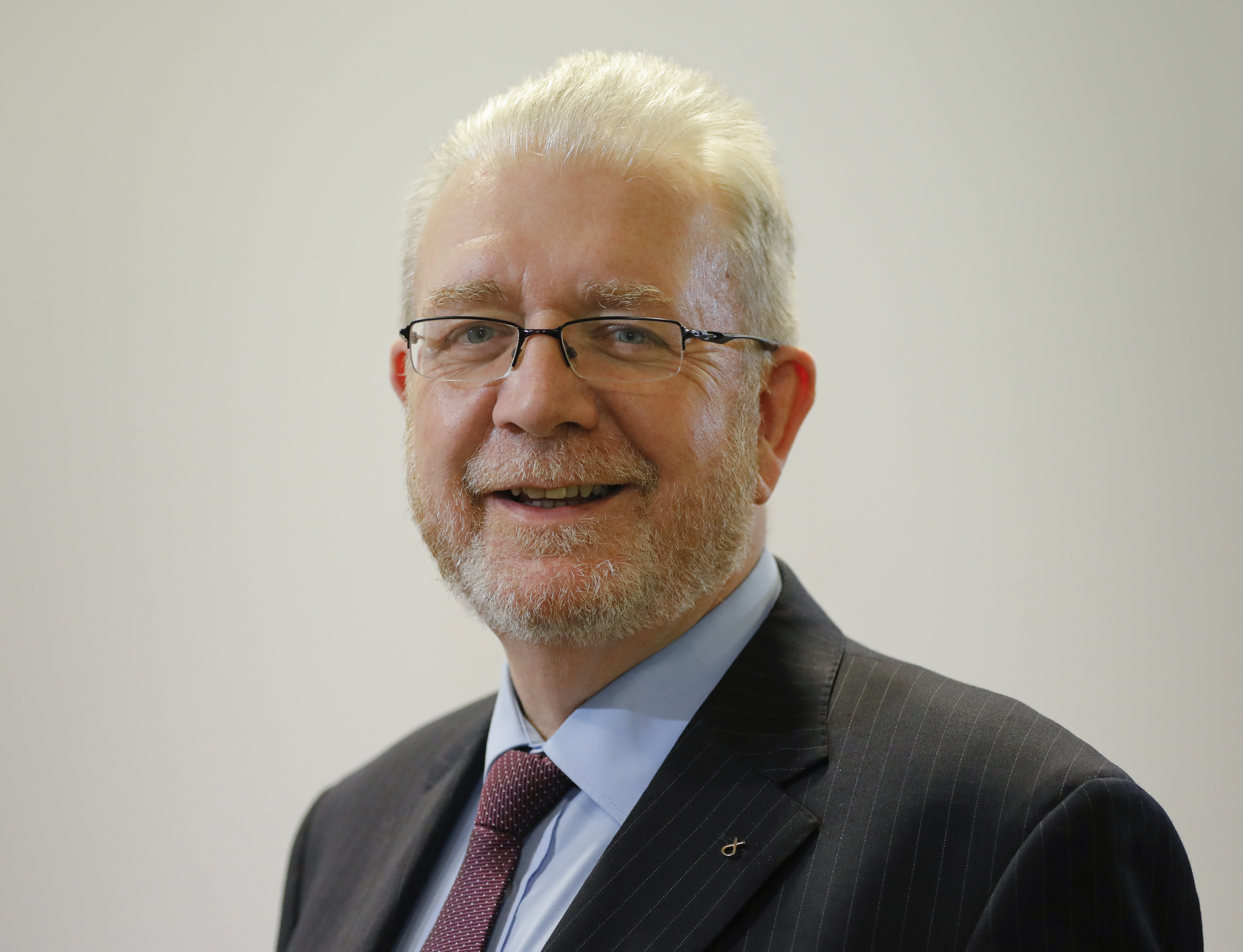
Angus Robertson,
Cabinet Secretary for Constitution, External Affairs and Culture

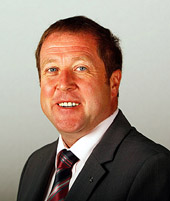
George Adam,
Minister for Parliamentary Business

=== Management ===
- Joe Griffin, Director-General Strategy and External Affairs
