= Culture, Tourism and Major Events =

Directorate of the Scottish Government

The Culture, Tourism and Major Events Directorate (Scottish Gaelic: Buidheann-stiùiridh Cultar, Turasachd agus Tachartasan Mòra) is a directorate of the Scottish Government that has a responsibility for representing Scotland in other countries as a place of tourism, investment and cultural exchange.

== Membership of the directorate ==
=== Cabinet secretaries ===
Current composition of the directorate are:

- Angus Robertson, Cabinet Secretary for the Constitution, External Affairs and Culture
- Kaukab Stewart, Minister for Culture, Europe and International Development

=== Directorate management ===
The management of the directorate consists of:

- Liz Ditchburn, Director-General of Economy
- Jonathan Pryce, Director of Culture, Tourism and Major Events

== See also ==
- Scottish Government
- Directorates of the Scottish Government
