= Scottish Cabinet =

Decision-making body of the Scottish Government

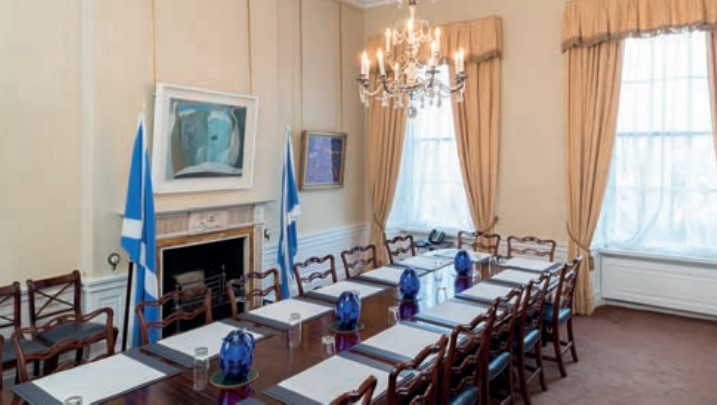
- Cabinet Room of the Scottish Government in Bute House

Cabinet overview
- Formed: 1999 (27 years ago)
- Type: Cabinet of the Scottish Government
- Jurisdiction: Scotland
- Headquarters: Cabinet Room, Bute House, Edinburgh
- Website: Scottish Cabinet webpage

The Scottish Cabinet is the main decision-making body of the Scottish Government, the devolved government of Scotland. It is headed by the first minister, and made up of the deputy first minister, cabinet secretaries of the Scottish Government, the Lord Advocate and Solicitor General for Scotland (the Scottish Law Officers), the Permanent Secretary to the Scottish Government and the Minister for Parliamentary Business.

Members of the cabinet are usually appointed on the decision of the first minister, as well as individual interests in obtaining a Cabinet Secretary position along with prior experience as an MSP. Decisions made by the cabinet are subject to scrutiny from the Scottish Parliament on matters such as the budget and spending allocation. Cabinet ministers are free to openly discuss and share their opinions on matters at cabinet meetings, however, once decisions have been agreed, whether they agree or disagree, ministers are expected to "put on a united front" for the purpose of promoting government policy.

The cabinet meets each Tuesday within the Cabinet Room located in Bute House in Edinburgh, the official residence of the first minister. If required, the cabinet will meet during periods of parliamentary recess, and is supported by Cabinet Sub-Committees. The sub–committees of the cabinet have delegated authority from the cabinet to take decisions on any legislative matter which do not require full cabinet consideration.

== Overview ==
=== Compositions ===
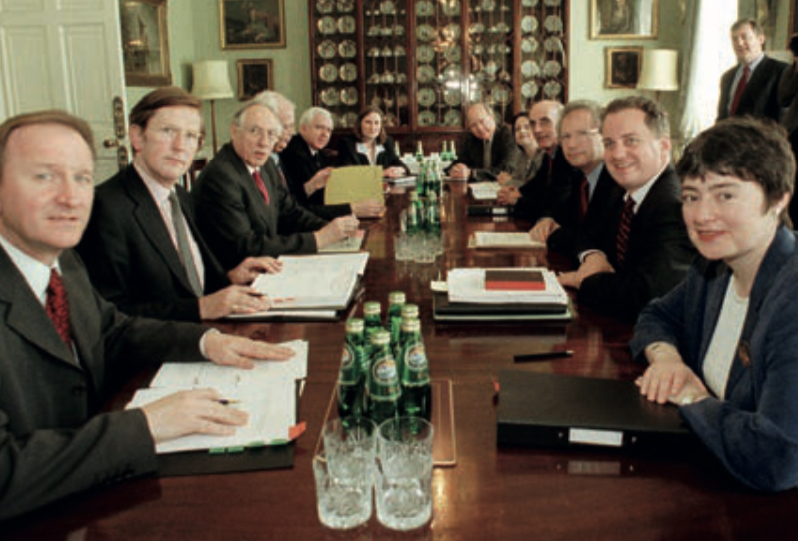
First meeting of the Dewar government, 1999

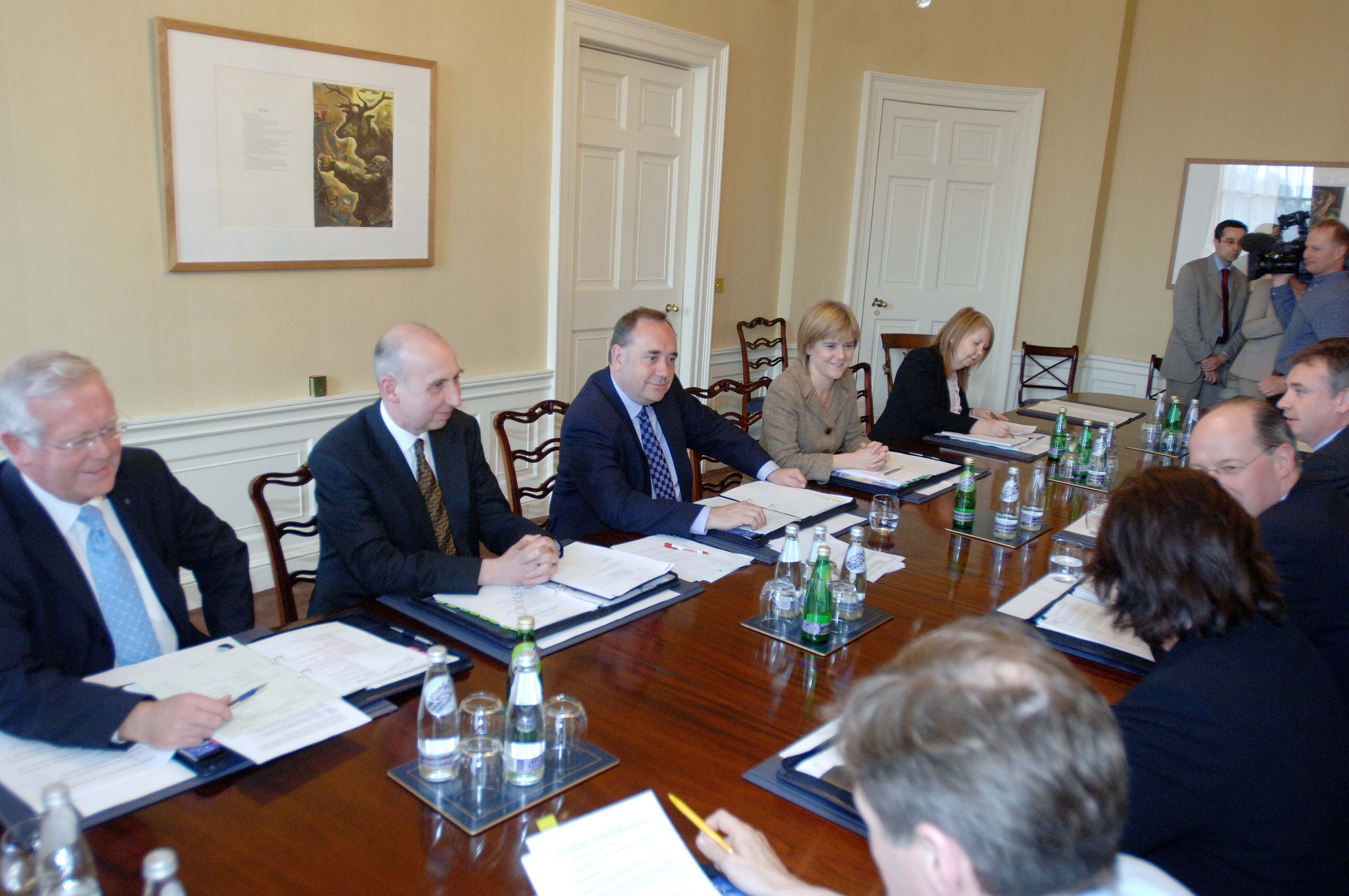
First meeting of the new Salmond cabinet, May 2007

The Dewar government was formed by Donald Dewar in May 1999 and dissolved in October 2000 following his death. The McLeish government subsequently formed on 27 October 2000 and was headed by first minister Henry McLeish, before being dissolved on 8 November 2001 following McLeish's resignation as first minister. The First McConnell government was formed by first minister Jack McConnell on 27 November 2001 following his appointment as first minister following the resignation by Henry McLeish.

McConnell formed his second cabinet on 20 May 2003 and was dissolved on 16 May 2007, whereby it was replaced by the First Salmond government following Alex Salmond's election victory in the 2007 Scottish Parliament election. Following his appointment as First Minister, Alex Salmond replaced the term "minister" for members of his cabinet with the term "cabinet secretaries". One of the first decisions by Salmond as First Minister was to reduce the number of cabinet secretaries attending cabinet to six, a move which promoted as a key move in "efficient government agenda".

Following the 2011 Scottish Parliament election, the SNP returned to government, forming a majority government, the first time in the history of the Scottish Parliament. The Second Salmond government was increased in size, from five cabinet secretaries to eight. Salmond's second cabinet was formed on 19 May 2011 and dissolved on 18 November 2014, following his resignation as first minister following the defeat of the Yes Scotland campaign in the 2014 Scottish independence referendum. Salmond's deputy first minister, Nicola Sturgeon, succeeded him as first minister, forming her government cabinet on 20 November 2014. It was formed of ten people: Sturgeon and nine cabinet secretaries. It was gender-balanced with five men and five women. There were thirteen junior ministerial positions outwith the cabinet.

Sturgeon formed her third cabinet following election victory in the 2021 election, with her third and final cabinet forming on 19 May 2021 and dissolving on 28 March 2023 following her decision to resign as first minister.

Humza Yousaf succeeded Sturgeon as first minister, forming his first cabinet of the Scottish Government on 29 March 2023. His cabinet was dissolved on 25 April 2024 following his decision to withdraw the SNP from the Bute House Agreement. His second cabinet was formed amongst a political crisis and was releatively short lived, formed on 25 April 2024 and dissolving on 7 May 2024 following his resignation as first minister.

John Swinney was appointed first minister in May 2024, forming his first Scottish cabinet on 8 May 2024. John Swinney was reelected in the 2026 Scottish Parliament election and formed the incumbent cabinet on 20 May 2026.

=== Additional attendees at cabinet ===
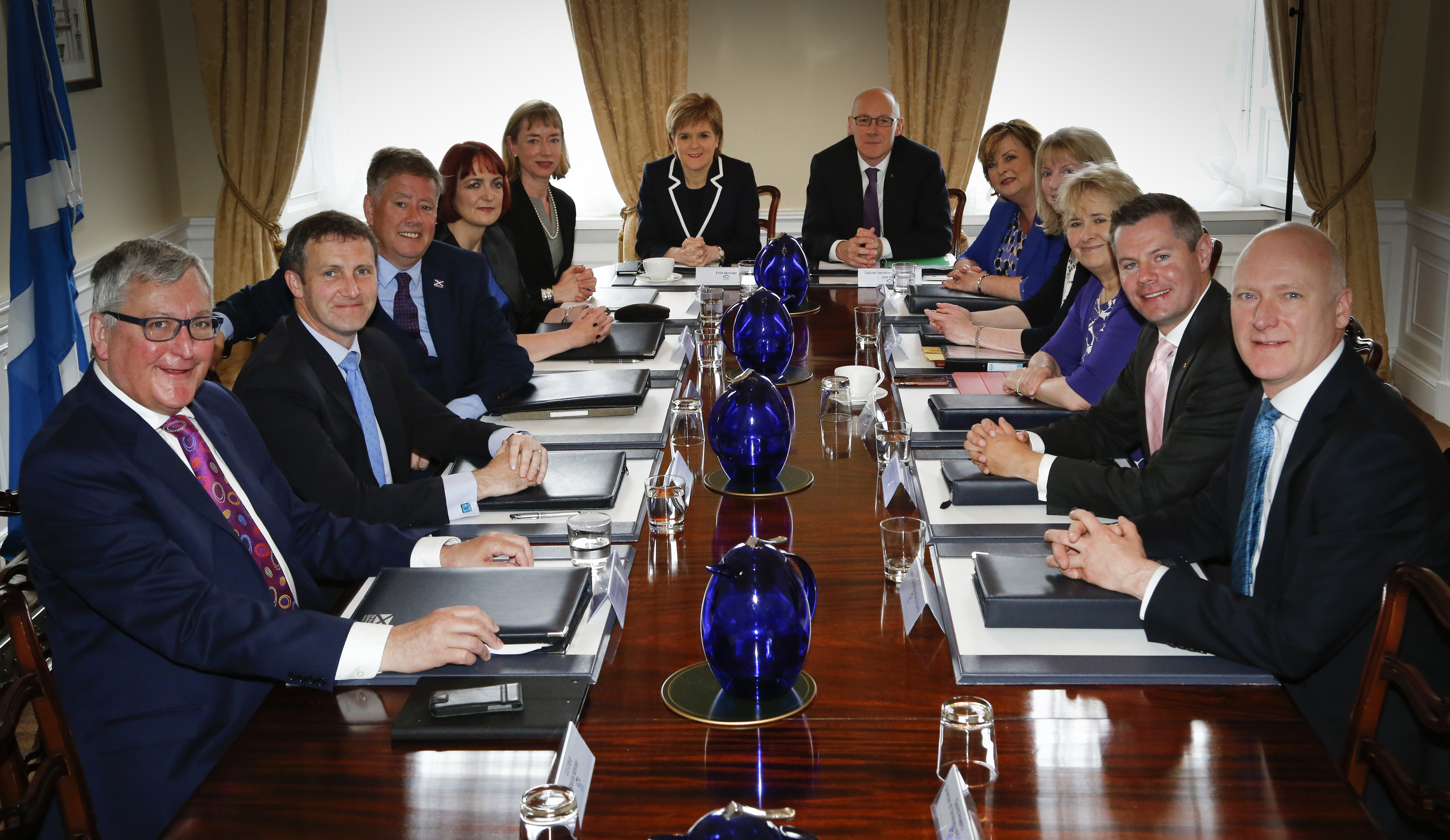
The cabinet of the Second Sturgeon government, 2016

From the establishment of the Scottish Government in 1999 until the election of Alex Salmond as first minister in 2007, the Lord Advocate was a regular attendee at meetings of the cabinet. After becoming first minister in May 2007, Salmond decided to depoliticise the role of the Lord Advocate by implementing a convention that would see the Lord Advocate only attend cabinet meetings when legal advice was to be given only, and did not participate in wider political debate as they had done from 1999. As a result, the number of occasions where the Lord Advocate would attend cabinet meetings was significantly reduced.

The Permanent Secretary to the Scottish Government attends all meetings of the cabinet in their capacity as the principal advisor on government policy to the first minister and secretary to the Scottish cabinet. Additionally, the Permanent Secretary to the Scottish Government serves as the principal accountable officer to the government, with overall responsibility on matters relating to the government's money and resources. Unlike other members of the Scottish cabinet, the Permanent Secretary to the Scottish Government is accountable to the Scottish Parliament and not the first minister, as is the case with the cabinet secretaries within the Scottish cabinet.

The Minister for Parliamentary Business is the only Scottish Government junior minister who regularly attends meetings of the Scottish cabinet. The minister is directly responsible for Boundaries Scotland, Freedom Of Information (FOI) requests, government and parliamentary business, government statistics, local government elections, the Office of the Chief Researcher, open government and Citizens' Assemblies and Scottish Parliamentary elections. The Minister for Parliamentary Business advises and informs the cabinet on each of these areas, as well as directly supporting the first minister in their functions. The Chief of Staff to the First Minister may also attend cabinet meetings at the request of the first minister.

=== List of Scottish cabinets ===
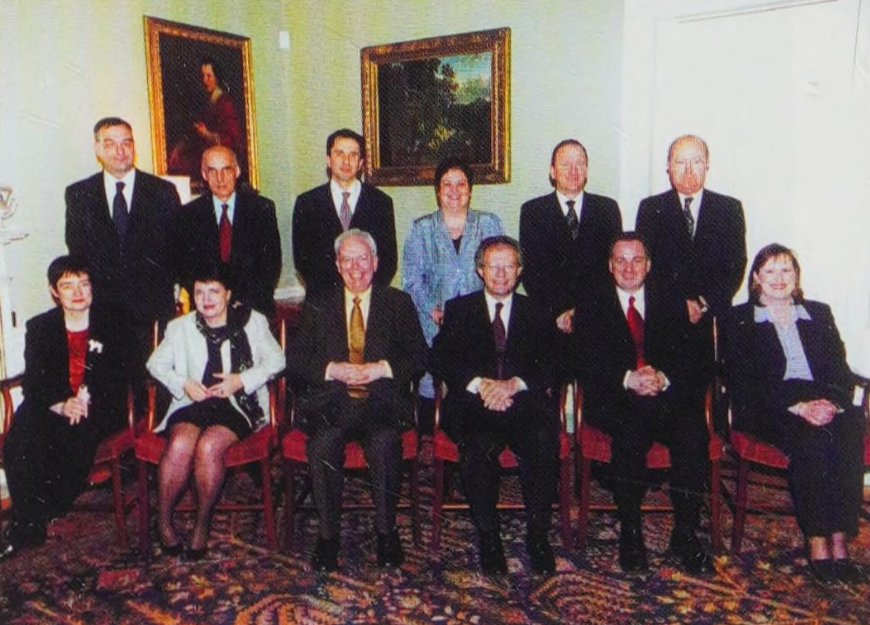
The Scottish cabinet during the premiership of Henry McLeish, October 2000

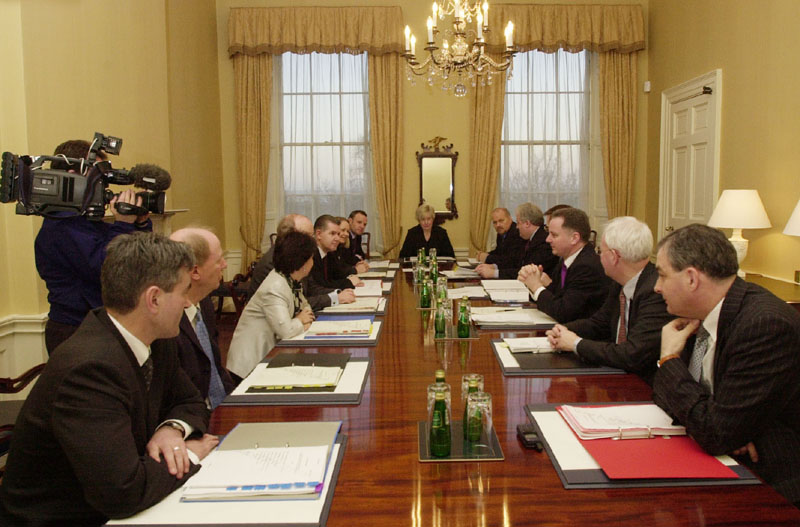
The First McConnell government, December 2001

Each first minister has selected their own cabinet during their term in office. For comprehensive listing of the cabinets appointed by each first minister, see:

- Donald Dewar
  - Dewar government (1999–2000)
- Henry McLeish
  - McLeish government (2000–2001)
- Jack McConnell
  - First McConnell government (2001–2003)
  - Second McConnell government (2003–2007)
- Alex Salmond
  - First Salmond government (2007–2011)
  - Second Salmond government (2011–2014)
- Nicola Sturgeon
  - First Sturgeon government (2014–2016)
  - Second Sturgeon government (2016–2021)
  - Third Sturgeon government (2021–2023)
- Humza Yousaf
  - First Yousaf government (2023–2024)
  - Second Yousaf government (2024)
- John Swinney
  - First Swinney government (2024–2026)
  - Second Swinney government (2026-present)

=== Travelling cabinet ===
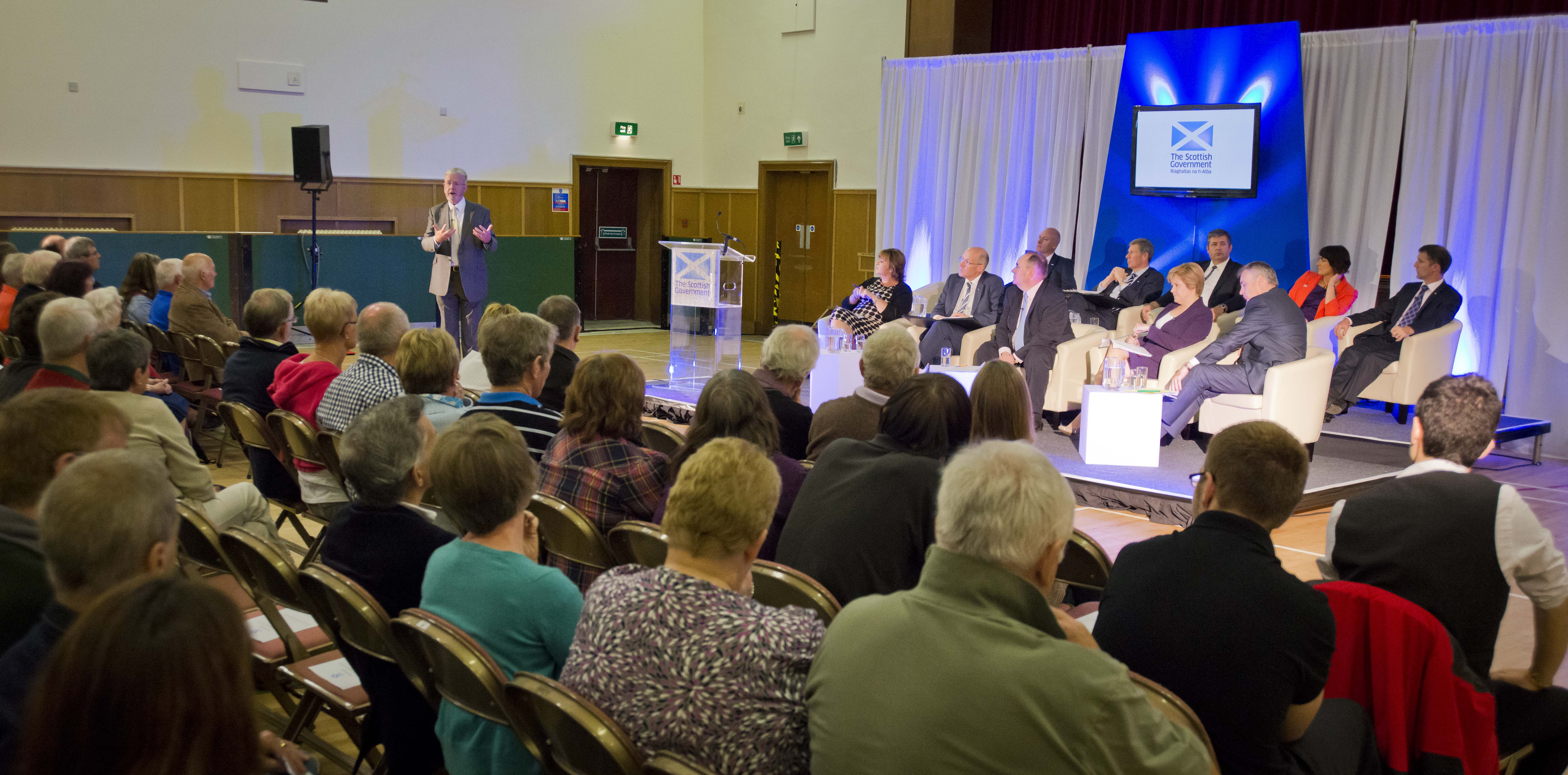
Travelling cabinet in Campbeltown

As of 2024, a total of fifty-two travelling cabinet meetings have been undertaken by the Scottish cabinet. Members of the cabinet will travel to other parts of Scotland, outwith Bute House in Edinburgh, to discuss local issues and gather public opinions on a range of government policies and objectives.

In October 2024, the Scottish cabinet travelled to Ayr in South Ayrshire, chaired by the first minister. The cabinet toured local businesses and projects to highlight the objectives of the Scottish Government.

First Minister, John Swinney, said the travelling cabinet "connects with communities across the country and enables us to make informed decisions as we strive to create a wealthier, fairer and greener Scotland".

== Scottish Cabinet ==
=== Attendees at Cabinet ===
As of 22 May 2026, the makeup of the current Cabinet is as follows:

Swinney government
Minister	Office(s)	Department	Took office
Cabinet ministers
John Swinney; MSP for Perthshire North	First Minister of Scotland; Keeper of the Great Seal of Scotland	Office of the First Minister	8 May 2024 (2 years ago)
Jenny Gilruth; MSP for Mid Fife and Glenrothes	Deputy First Minister of Scotland; Cabinet Secretary for Finance and Local Government	Exchequer, Strategy and Performance Directorates; Corporate Directorates	20 May 2026 (2 months ago)
Angela Constance; MSP for Almond Valley	Cabinet Secretary for Health and Care	Health and Social Care Directorates	20 May 2026 (2 months ago)
Stephen Flynn; MSP for Aberdeen South	Cabinet Secretary for Economy, Transport and Tourism	Economy Directorates	20 May 2026 (2 months ago)
Gillian Martin; MSP for Aberdeenshire East	Cabinet Secretary for Climate Action and Energy	Net Zero Directorates	11 June 2025 (13 months ago)
Màiri McAllan; MSP for Clydesdale	Cabinet Secretary for Education, Culture and Gaelic	Education Scotland; Education and Justice Directorates	20 May 2026 (2 months ago)
Ivan McKee; MSP for Glasgow Easterhouse and Springburn	Cabinet Secretary for Public Service Reform	Exchequer, Strategy and Performance Directorates; Corporate Directorates	20 May 2026 (2 months ago)
Shirley-Anne Somerville; MSP for Edinburgh Central	Cabinet Secretary for Social Justice and Housing	Social Security Scotland; Communities and External Affairs Directorates	29 March 2023 (3 years ago) (Note: Minister title was Cabinet Secretary for social justice until May 2026) (Note: Appointed by Humza Yousaf during the First Yousaf government and retained by Swinney in the Swinney government)
Neil Gray; MSP for Airdrie and Shotts	Cabinet Secretary for Justice	Education and Justice Directorates	20 May 2026 (2 months ago)
Law officers
Ruth Charteris	Lord Advocate	Crown Office and Procurator Fiscal Service	19 June 2026 (35 days ago)
Brian Gill	Solicitor General for Scotland	Crown Office and Procurator Fiscal Service	19 June 2026 (35 days ago)
Also attending cabinet
Joe Griffin	Permanent Secretary to the Scottish Government	Civil service	7 April 2025 (15 months ago)
Jamie Hepburn; MSP for Cumbernauld and Kilsyth	Minister for Parliamentary Business & Veterans	Strategy and External Affairs Directorates	20 May 2026 (2 months ago)
