= Chief Special Adviser to the First Minister =

Adviser to the First Minister of Wales

Wales Chief Special Adviser to the First Minister
- Prif Gynghorydd Arbennig y Prif Weinidog (Welsh)
- Incumbent; Aled ap Dafydd since May 2026
- Member of: Welsh Government
- Reports to: First Minister
- Seat: Crown Buildings, Cathays Park, Cardiff
- Appointer: First Minister
- Term length: At the First Minister's pleasure
- Inaugural holder: Gareth Williams
- Formation: 12 May 1999
- Salary: £76,000–£92,000 (2025)

The Chief Special Adviser to the First Minister (Welsh: Prif Gynghorydd Arbennig y Prif Weinidog) is the chief of staff and most senior special adviser of the first minister of Wales.

== History ==
After the creation of the National Assembly for Wales and the position of First Secretary of Wales in 1999, the inaugural first secretary Alun Michael employed a team of four special advisers in his office, including a chief of staff. In May 2000, his successor Rhodri Morgan gave the chief of staff the title of Senior Special Adviser to the First Secretary. In October 2000, the office of First Secretary of Wales was renamed First Minister of Wales. The chief of staff's title also changed to reflect this, becoming Senior Special Adviser to the First Minister. Under First Minister Carwyn Jones, the office was renamed Chief Special Adviser to the First Minister in 2016.

First Secretary Alun Michael's chief of staff was Gareth Williams, a Labour politician who stood in the 1999 European Parliament elections. He resigned from the post when Michael resigned as first secretary in February 2000. Michael's successor Rhodri Morgan brought in his ally Kevin Brennan to act as his chief of staff until a successor was found. He appointed Paul Griffiths as his senior special adviser to the first secretary in May 2000. After the office of First Secretary of Wales was renamed First Minister of Wales, Morgan appointed another senior special adviser, Mark Drakeford, to serve alongside Griffiths later that year. Griffiths left the role in August 2007 while Drakeford stepped down when Morgan resigned in 2009.

During the One Wales coalition government between Labour and Plaid Cymru, First Minister Rhodri Morgan and his successor Carwyn Jones employed Anna Nicholl from Plaid Cymru as a senior special adviser from 2008 to 2011. From May 2011 to May 2016, Jones's senior special adviser was Jo Kiernan. In 2016, Jones appointed Matt Greenough to the role and renamed it Chief Special Adviser to the First Minister.

Carwyn Jones's successor Mark Drakeford appointed Jane Runeckles as his chief special adviser in December 2018. His successor Vaughan Gething appointed David Hagendyk as his adviser in March 2024. Gething's successor Eluned Morgan appointed Rhodri Morgan's chief of staff Kevin Brennan as her chief special adviser on her ascendency to the premiership in August 2024. In December 2024, she announced that he would leave the role after he was nominated for a peerage by Prime Minister Keir Starmer. She appointed former MP and MEP Wayne David as his successor from the new year onwards.

In July 2025, Morgan announced Wayne David’s departure due to ill health. She later appointed Citizens Advice Head of Policy, and former Welsh Labour Head of Communications, Luke Young as the new Chief Special Adviser. He is an alumnus of Swansea University. Young was described by ITV Wales as “a well known Labour insider”.

It was reported in June 2026 that after the change of administration from Labour to Plaid Cymru that Rhun ap Iorwerth had appointed former BBC journalist and former Plaid Cymru director of political strategy, Aled ap Dafydd, as the Senior Special Adviser to the Prif Weinidog.

== Role ==
The chief special adviser is the first minister's chief of staff and their most senior special adviser.

== List of officeholders ==
=== Chief of Staff to the First Secretary ===
Chief of Staff	Term of office		Party	Administration
Gareth Williams	12 May 1999	9 February 2000	Labour	Michael
Kevin Brennan; Acting	9 February 2000	May; 2000	Labour	Rhodri Morgan (interim)
=== Senior Special Adviser to the First Secretary ===
Senior Special Adviser	Term of office		Party	Administration
Paul Griffiths	May; 2000	16 October 2000	Labour	Rhodri Morgan (interim)
=== Senior Special Adviser to the First Minister ===
Senior Special Adviser	Term of office		Party	Government
Paul Griffiths; Serving with Mark Drakeford; Mark Drakeford; Serving with Paul Griffiths (2000–2007); Serving with Simon Thomas (2008–2009)	16 October 2000	August; 2007 (Griffiths); 10 December 2009 (Drakeford)	Labour	Rhodri Morgan I (Lab.–L.D.)
Paul Griffiths; Serving with Mark Drakeford; Mark Drakeford; Serving with Paul Griffiths (2000–2007); Serving with Simon Thomas (2008–2009)	16 October 2000	August; 2007 (Griffiths); 10 December 2009 (Drakeford)	Labour	Rhodri Morgan II
Paul Griffiths; Serving with Mark Drakeford; Mark Drakeford; Serving with Paul Griffiths (2000–2007); Serving with Simon Thomas (2008–2009)	16 October 2000	August; 2007 (Griffiths); 10 December 2009 (Drakeford)	Labour	Rhodri Morgan III
Paul Griffiths; Serving with Mark Drakeford; Mark Drakeford; Serving with Paul Griffiths (2000–2007); Serving with Simon Thomas (2008–2009)	16 October 2000	August; 2007 (Griffiths); 10 December 2009 (Drakeford)	Labour	Rhodri Morgan IV (Lab.–P.C.)
Simon Thomas; Serving with Mark Drakeford (2008–2009)	2008	11 May 2011	Plaid	Rhodri Morgan IV (Lab.–P.C.)
Simon Thomas; Serving with Mark Drakeford (2008–2009)	2008	11 May 2011	Plaid	Jones I (Lab.–P.C.)
Jo Kiernan	11 May 2011	5 May 2016	Labour	Jones II
=== Chief Special Adviser to the First Minister ===
Chief Special Adviser	Term of office		Party	Government
Matt Greenough	19 May 2016	12 December 2018	Labour	Jones III (Lab.–L.D.–Ind.)
Jane Runeckles	13 December 2018	20 March 2024	Labour	Drakeford I (Lab.–L.D.–Ind.)
Jane Runeckles	13 December 2018	20 March 2024	Labour	Drakeford II
David Hagendyk	March; 2024	5 August 2024	Labour	Gething
Kevin Brennan	6 August 2024	31 December 2024	Labour	Eluned Morgan
Wayne David	1 January 2025	24 July 2025	Labour	Eluned Morgan
Luke Young	25 July 2025	12 May 2026	Labour	Eluned Morgan
Aled ap Dafydd	May; 2026	Incumbent	Plaid	Rhun ap Iorwerth

== See also ==
- Chief of Staff to the First Minister
- Downing Street Chief of Staff
