= First Minister of Scotland =

Head of government of Scotland

- Scottish Gaelic: Prìomh Mhinistear na h-Alba
- Logo of the Office of the First Minister

- Flag of Scotland

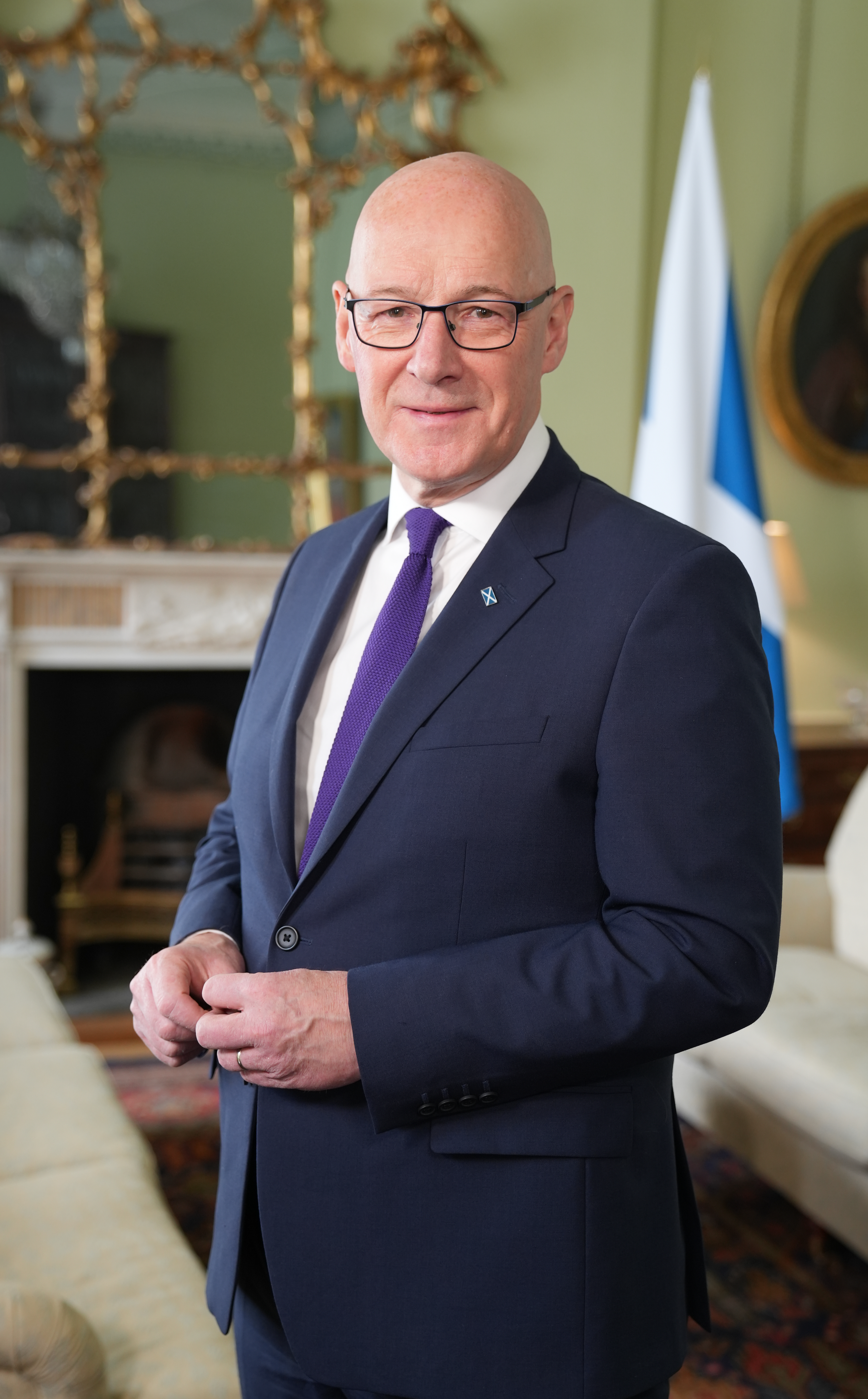
- Incumbent; John Swinney since 8 May 2024
- Office of the First Minister; Scottish Government; Scottish Cabinet; Scottish Parliament
- Style: First Minister (informal); The Right Honourable (UK and Commonwealth); His Excellency (international)
- Status: Head of government
- Member of: Scottish Parliament; Scottish Cabinet; Privy Council; British-Irish Council; PM and Heads of Devolved Governments Council; Council of the Nations and Regions; National Economic Council
- Reports to: Scottish Parliament
- Residence: Bute House
- Seat: St Andrew's House
- Nominator: Scottish Parliament
- Appointer: The monarch
- Term length: At His Majesty's pleasure; (following nomination by the Scottish Parliament)
- Inaugural holder: Donald Dewar
- Formation: 17 May 1999 (27 years ago)
- Deputy: Deputy First Minister of Scotland
- Salary: £165,678 per annum (2023) (Note: The previous First Minister, Nicola Sturgeon, froze her salary at £140,496 (2008–09 levels) when she took office and donated the additional pay back to the Scottish government.) (including £67,662 MSP salary)
- Website: firstminister.gov.scot

The first minister of Scotland (Scottish Gaelic: Prìomh Mhinistear na h-Alba) is the head of government of Scotland and the keeper of the Great Seal of Scotland, one of the great officers of state in the country. The first minister leads the Scottish Government, the executive branch of the devolved government.

The first minister chairs the Scottish Cabinet and is primarily responsible for the formulation, development, and presentation of the Scottish Government's policies. Additional functions of the first minister include promoting and representing Scotland in an official capacity, at home and abroad, as part of the Scottish Government's approach to international relations. The first minister is nominated by the Scottish Parliament by members of the Scottish Parliament (MSPs), and is formally appointed by the monarch.

Members of the Scottish Cabinet and junior ministers of the Scottish Government are appointed by the first minister. The first minister is directly accountable to the Scottish Parliament for their actions and the actions of the wider government and cabinet. Additionally, the first minister is responsible for appointing the country's law officers – the Lord Advocate and Solicitor General for Scotland, as well as nominating and appointing the Lord President of the Court of Session, the Lord Justice Clerk and Senators of the College of Justice, judges who sit within the Supreme Courts of Scotland.

The first minister is supported by their deputy first minister, as well as cabinet secretaries, junior ministers, government directorates and civil servants. The first minister is advised on matters by their chief of staff. The office is currently held by John Swinney, the MSP for Perthshire North and the leader of the Scottish National Party (SNP). Swinney was elected first minister by the Scottish Parliament on 7 May 2024, and was sworn in the following day at the Court of Session.

== History ==
Following the referendum in 1997, in which the Scottish electorate gave their consent, the Scottish Parliament and Scottish Executive (later the Scottish Government) were established by the Parliament of the United Kingdom and the Labour government of the prime minister, Tony Blair.

Under the Acts of Union 1707, the former Parliament of Scotland merged with the English parliament, forming the Parliament of Great Britain. The re-establishment of a dedicated legislature and executive for Scotland was known as devolution and initiated a measure of home rule (self-governance) in its domestic affairs, such as health, education and justice. The devolution movement came to a head in the 1970s, and resulted in a Royal Commission on the Constitution, leading to the Scotland Act 1978. This would have established an autonomous Scottish Executive with a leader termed 'First Secretary', a post for which Strathclyde political leader Geoff Shaw was widely expected to be chosen. Shaw died prematurely and the failure of the referendum of 1979 led to the Act not being implemented.

Following the 1997 referendum and Scotland Act 1998, Scottish devolution led to the establishment of a post of first minister as head of the devolved Scottish Government.

Since 1999, the Secretary of State for Scotland of the British Government has had a much reduced role at the renamed Scotland Office as a result of the transfer of responsibilities to the Scottish Parliament and Scottish Government.

== Election and term ==
=== Nomination and selection ===
The first minister is nominated by the Scottish Parliament at the beginning of each term, by means of an exhaustive ballot among its members, and is then formally appointed by the monarch.

Although any member of the Scottish Parliament can be nominated for first minister, the government must maintain the confidence of the Scottish Parliament in order to gain supply (access to exchequer funds) and remain in office. For this reason, every permanent first minister has been the leader of the largest party, or the leader of the senior partner in any majority coalition. There is no term of office for a first minister; they hold office "at His Majesty's pleasure". In practice, a first minister cannot remain in office against the will of the Scottish Parliament; indeed, the Scotland Act explicitly requires the first minister to either resign or seek a parliamentary dissolution (and with it, new elections) if his or her government "no longer enjoys the confidence of the Parliament." Whenever the office of first minister falls vacant, the sovereign is responsible for appointing the new incumbent upon nomination by the Scottish Parliament; the appointment is formalised at a meeting between the sovereign and the first minister designate.

Given the additional member system used to elect its members, it is difficult for a single party to gain an overall majority of seats in the Scottish Parliament. The SNP did gain an overall majority of seats in the 2011 election, and thus had enough numbers to vote in its leader, Alex Salmond, as first minister for a second term.

After the election of the Scottish Parliament, a first minister must be nominated within a period of 28 days. Under the terms of the Scotland Act, if the Parliament fails to nominate a first minister, within this time frame, it will be dissolved and a fresh election held. If an incumbent first minister is defeated in a general election, they do not immediately vacate office. The first minister only leaves office when the Scottish Parliament nominates a successor individual.

=== Oath of office ===
After accepting office, the first minister takes the Official Oath, as set out in the Promissory Oaths Act 1868. The oath is tendered by the Lord President of the Court of Session at a sitting of the Court in Parliament House in Edinburgh. The oath is:

I, [name], do swear that I will well and truly serve His Majesty King Charles in the office of first minister of the Scottish Government, So help me God.

=== Term length ===
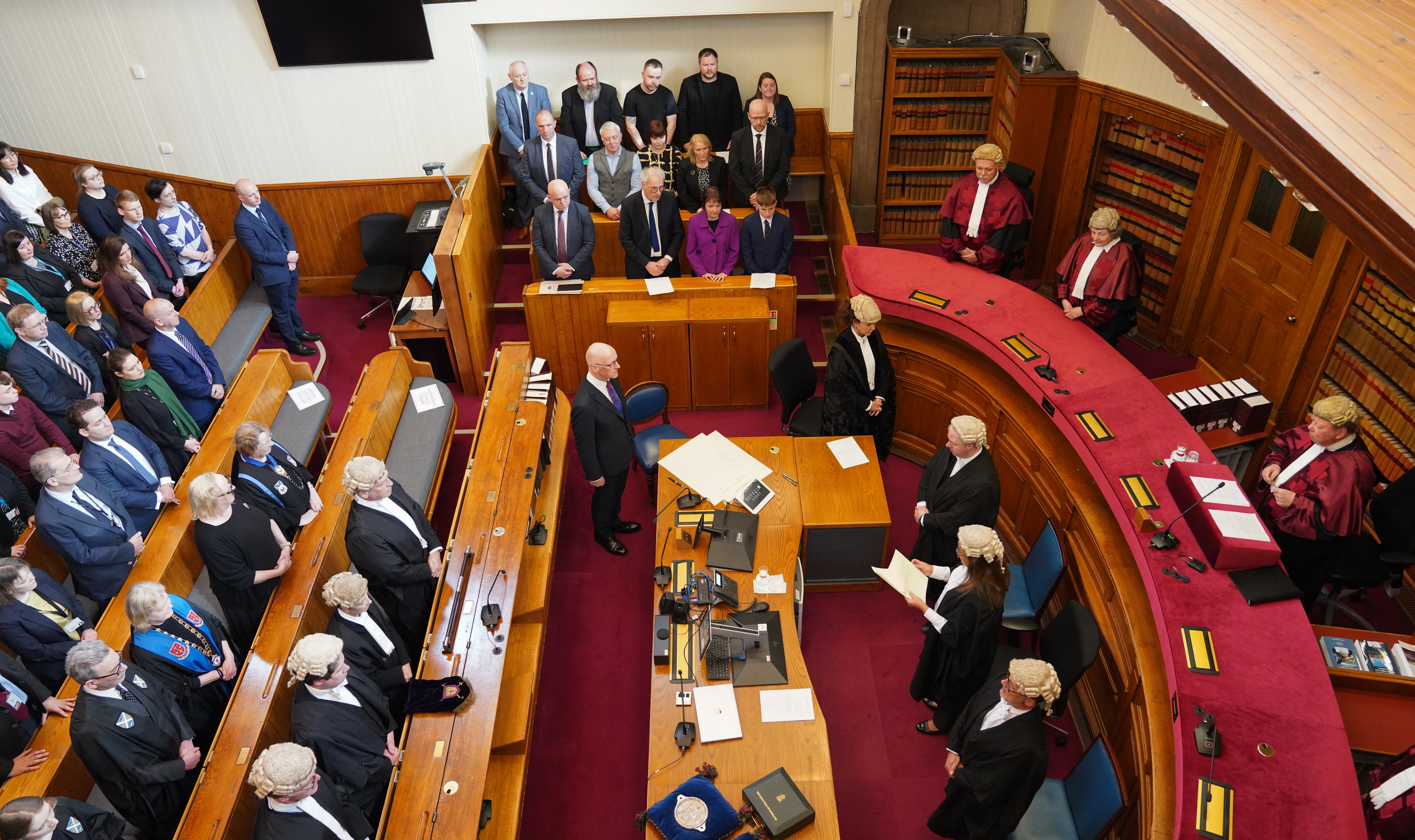
First Minister John Swinney taking the oath of office at the Court of Session

The period in office of a first minister is not linked to the term of members of the Scottish Parliament. The Scotland Act set out a four-year maximum term for each session of Parliament. The Act specifies that an election to the Scottish Parliament will be held on the first Thursday in May, every four years, starting from 1999. Parliament can be dissolved and an extraordinary general election held, before the expiration of the four-year term, but only if two-thirds (or more) of elected MSPs vote for such action in a resolution of the Scottish Parliament. If a simple majority of MSPs voted a no-confidence motion in the first minister or government, that would trigger a 28-day period for the nomination of a replacement; should that time period expire without the nomination of a new first minister, then an extraordinary election would have to be called.

The first minister, once appointed, continues in office as the head of the Scottish Government until they resign, are dismissed or die in office. Resignation can be triggered by the passage of a Motion of No Confidence in the first minister or the Scottish Government or by rejecting a motion of confidence in the Scottish Parliament. In those situations, the first minister must tender their resignation and the resignation of their government. In such circumstances, the presiding officer would appoint an interim first minister, until the Scottish Parliament determined on a new nominee to be appointed by the monarch.

During their tenure in office, the First Minister is supported by the Chief of Staff to the First Minister, who acts at the first minister's principal adviser on the first minister's strategic programme in government, inter-governmental relations, co-ordination of the team of special advisers to the first minister.

== Legislative powers ==
=== Scots Law and civil service ===
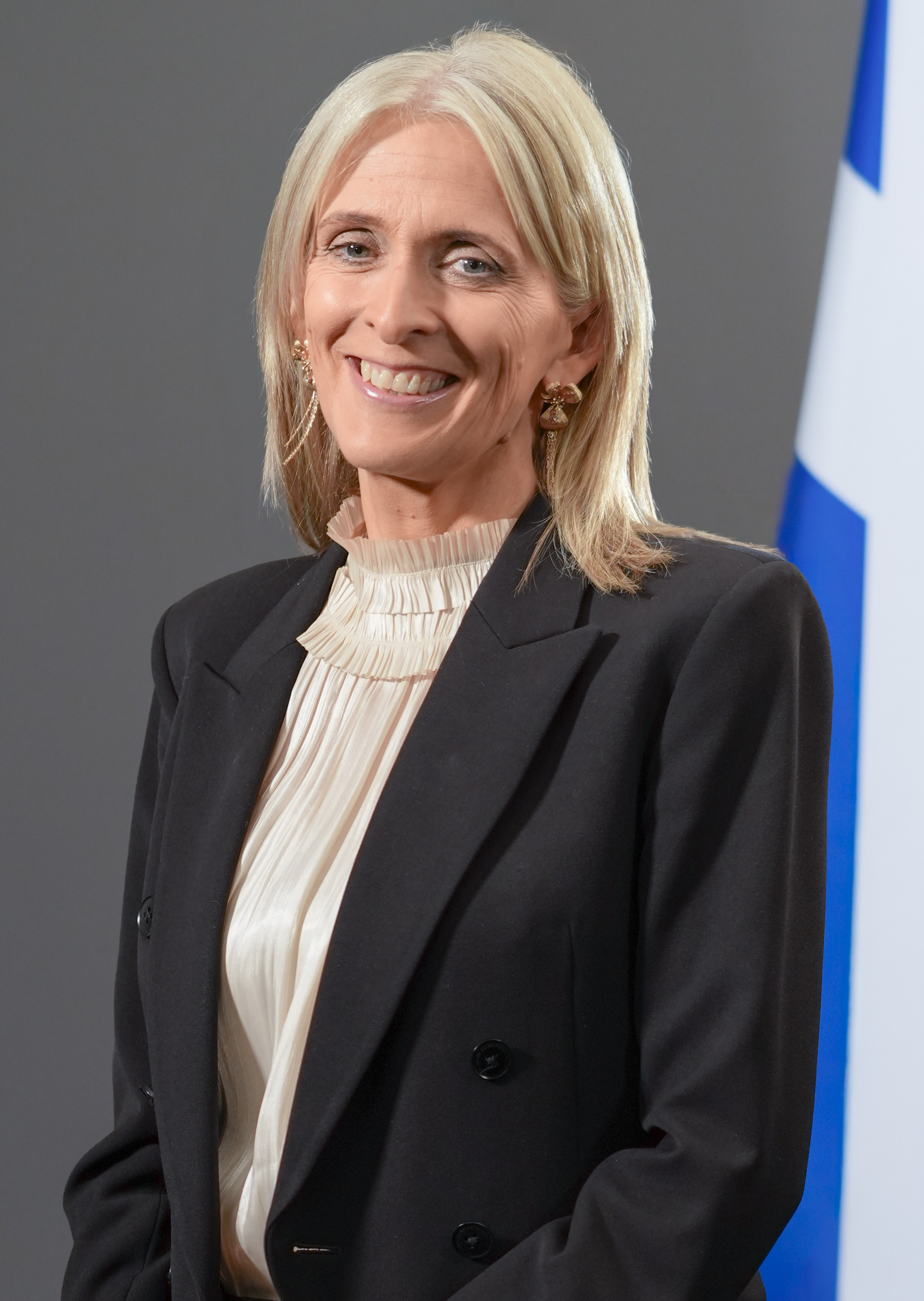
Ruth Charteris
Lord Advocate
since 2026

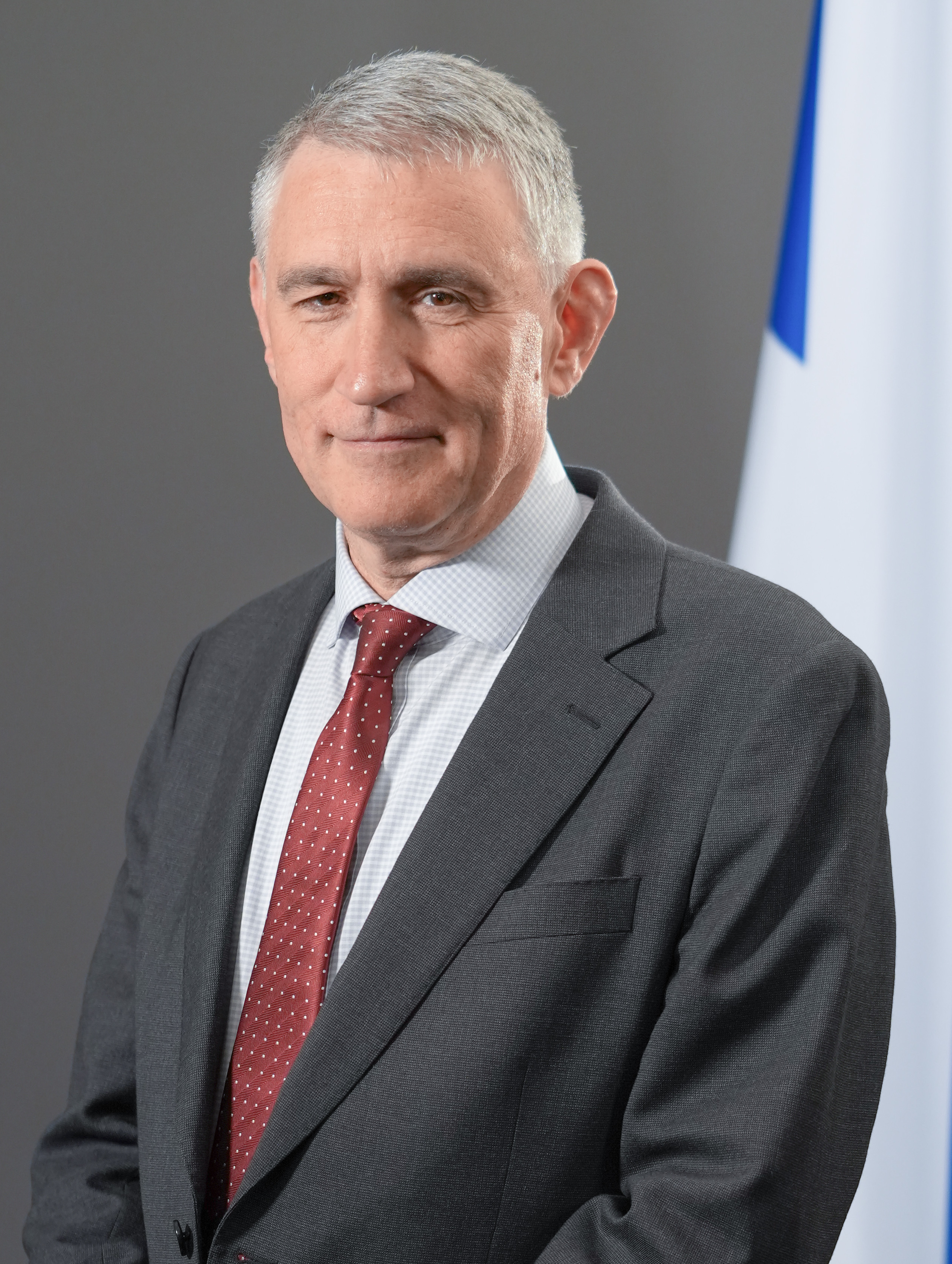
B. J. Gill
Solicitor General for Scotland
since 2026

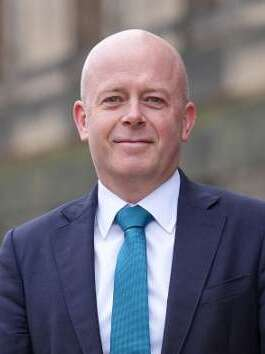
Joe Griffin
Permanent Secretary
Since 2025

As detailed in the Scotland Act 1998, the First Minister is responsible for recommending to the monarch a nominee for the position of Lord Advocate and Solicitor General for Scotland. The First Minister is also responsible for advocating whether a Lord Advocate or Solicitor General who is currently in post should be removed, subject to the approval of the Scottish Parliament. Additionally, the First Minister has various functions and responsibilities regarding the appointments and removal of Scottish judges within the Scottish court system.

The Permanent Secretary to the Scottish Government is nominated by the First Minister. The permanent secretary is the most senior civil servant in Scotland who serves to promote, implement, develop and communicating the Scottish Government's policy agenda. The First Minister is directly responsible for the management of the civil service in Scotland, as well as civil service staff within the Scottish Government.

The First Minister has responsibility in respect of the exercise of operation and functions during vacancies which may arise in the offices of Lord President of the Court of Session and Lord Justice Clerk and the incapacity of the holders of those offices as outlined in the Senior Judiciary (Vacancies and Incapacity)(Scotland) Act 2006. Additionally, the First Minister considers any action relating to recommendations made by the Standards Commission or Chief Investigating Officer in regards of Crown Appointments under Section 23 of the Ethical Standards in Public Life etc (Scotland) Act 2000.

The First Minister is an official consultee regarding selections for membership of the Supreme Court.

=== Security and intelligence ===
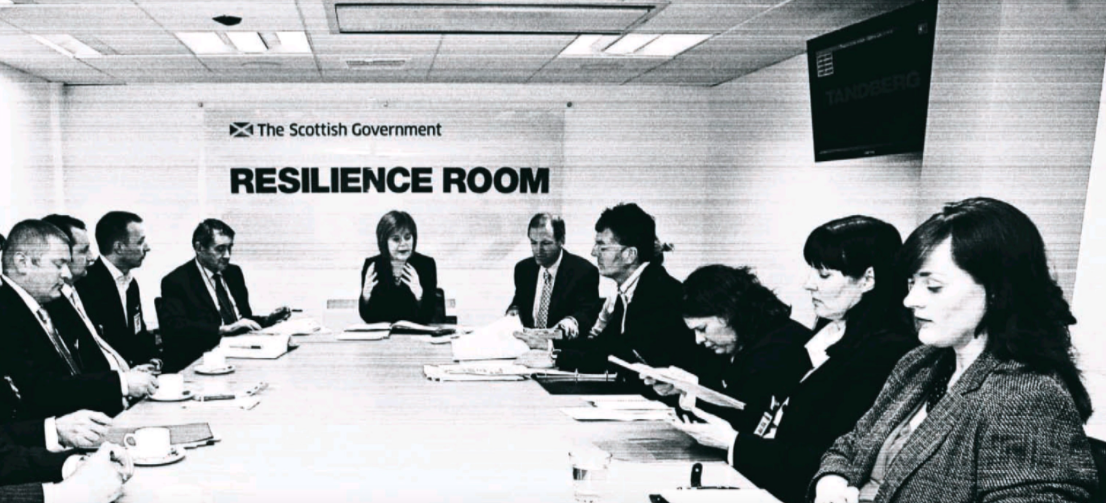
The Scottish Government Resilience Room (SGoRR) in operation

The Office of the First Minister has responsibility for all functions relating to reports made by the Interception of Communications Commissioner and Intelligence Services Commissioner as detailed in both Sections 58 and 60 of the Regulation of Investigatory Powers Act 2000. During times of national crisis, such as flooding, terror attacks or public health emergencies, the First Minister chairs the Scottish Government Resilience Room (SGoRR). The function of the resilience room committee is to co-ordinate policy and response to major events in Scotland that affect the population and, with the help of specialist teams within the division assist department, develop detailed risk assessments which are used to inform policy across Scotland.

==== Resilience response ====
There are currently different levels of resilience response in Scotland which is overseen by the First Minister and Scottish Government ministers:

- Cabinet Sub-Committee: Scottish Government Resilience CSC
- The Scottish Resilience Partnership (SRP)
- Scottish Government Resilience (Ministerial): SGoR(M)
- Scottish Government Resilience (Officials): SGoR(O)
- Scottish Government Resilience Room (SGoRR)

The first minister has chaired meetings of the Scottish Government Resilience Room on numerous occasions, such as in the aftermath of the 2007 Glasgow Airport attack and ahead of Storm Éowyn making landfall in Scotland in January 2025.

==== Resilience levels ====
The First Minister is directly responsible for each of the corresponding resilience levels in Scotland, and has the responsibility of the Scottish Government Liaison Offices who can be deployed in emergencies and national crisis to act as the principal point of contact for the First Minister, Scottish Government and other Scottish ministers.

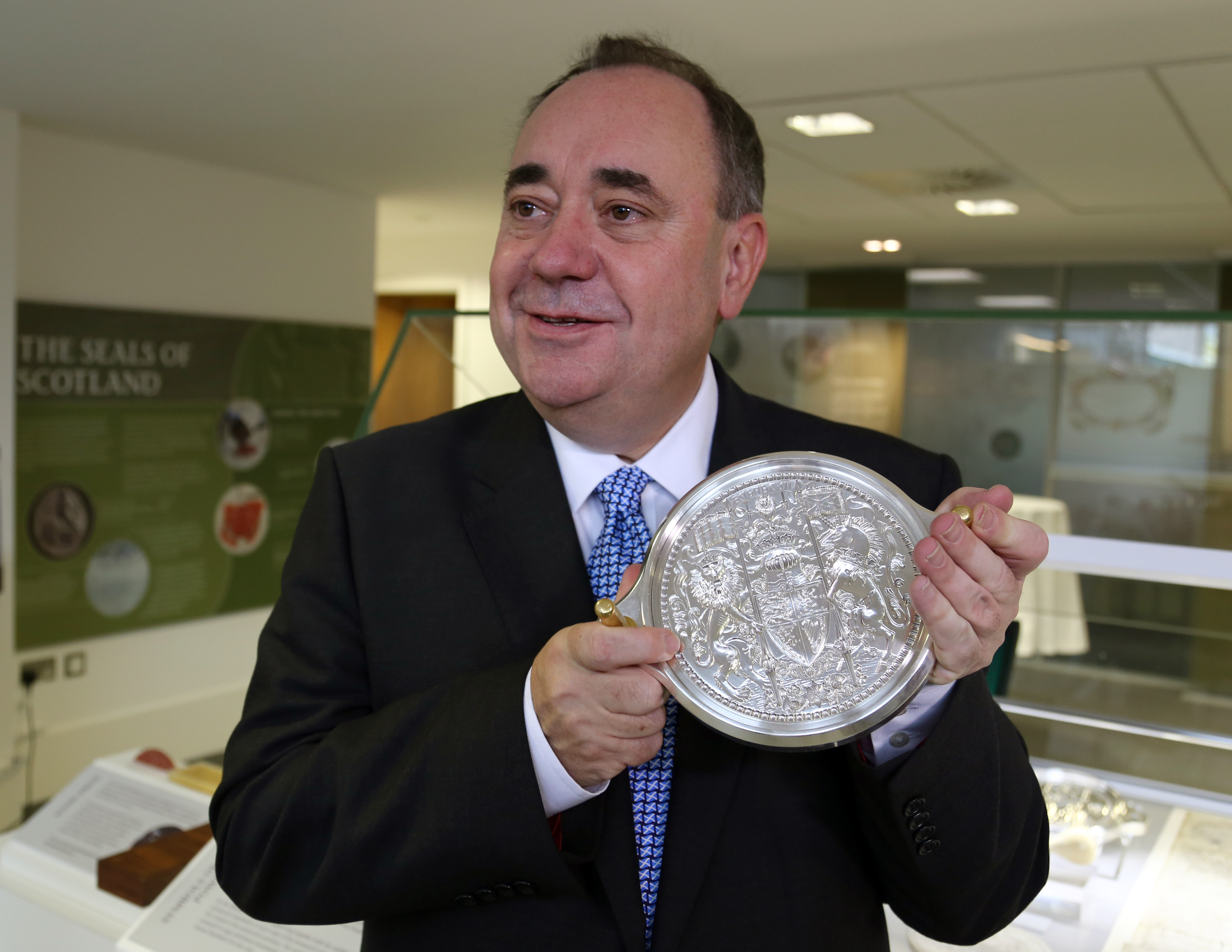
The first minister concurrently holds the office of Keeper of the Great Seal of Scotland during their tenure as First Minister

If a crisis or emergency is considered to affect the entirely of either the United Kingdom or the British Isles, such as the 2007 Glasgow Airport attack, the UK Government and Scottish Government (along with the governments of both Wales and Northern Ireland), will develop a co-ordinate response to a UK wide emergency or crisis. The First Minister is directly responsible for co-ordinating this policy and would be called to attend the UK Government's emergency room, COBRA, for instances such as a significant terrorist attack, a serious outbreak of animal disease or emergencies affecting large numbers of British citizens overseas.

=== Keeper of the Great Seal ===
The First Minister is the Keeper of the Great Seal of Scotland which is considered to be one of the highest privileges of the office. The First Minister has additional responsibility over how Wafer Scottish Seals are to be kept and how they are to be taken under section 38(4) & 38(5)(b) of the Scotland Act. The First Minister has the power to sign royal warrants on behalf of the monarch.

As Keeper of the Great Seal, First Minister Humza Yousaf was the first First Minister to oversee the departure of the Stone of Scone, an ancient symbol of Scotland's nationhood, for Westminster Abbey for usage in the Coronation of Charles III and Camilla on 6 May.

=== Privy Council ===
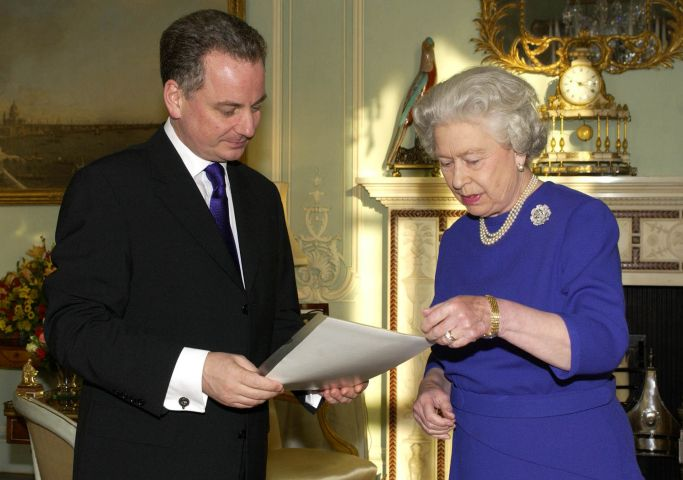
The First Minister becomes a member of the Privy Council upon receiving the Royal Warrant from the monarch

The First Minister is a member of the Privy Council and is appointed by the Monarch. There are a variety of matters in which the Prime Minister would offer advice to the monarch on the exercise of their functions and on which it would be appropriate for the Prime Minister to consult or to take advice from the First Minister. Such matters include the recommendations of Scottish candidates for honours and dignities, which are currently a reserved matter under the devolution settlement, and advice on the appointment of the Lords Lieutenants in Scotland, the Lord High Commissioner to the General Assembly of the Church of Scotland and members of the Royal Commission on Environmental Pollution and the Forestry Commission. There are also matters where a Minister of the Crown gives advice to the reigning monarch and the First Minister would need to be consulted by the Minister of the Crown, or would be required to give advice to that Minister of the Crown.

The Scotland Act 1998 confers upon the First Minister various functions of advising the monarch directly. Such functions include seeking the monarch's approval regarding the appointment of Scottish Ministers as well as recommending to the monarch nominations for appointment as Scottish Law Officers. Section 95 of the Scotland Act highlights the arrangements for the First Minister to nominate for the appointment as Lord President of the Court of Session and Lord Justice Clerk. Additionally, the Scotland Act also grants the First Minister to recommend to the monarch the appointment of other judges.

== Executive powers ==
The First Minister is the head of the Scottish Government and is responsible for the overall development, implementation and presentation of the government's policies, as well as responsible promoting and representing Scotland at home and overseas. The role and powers of the first minister are set out in sections 45 to 49 of the Scotland Act 1998.

=== Cabinet appointments ===
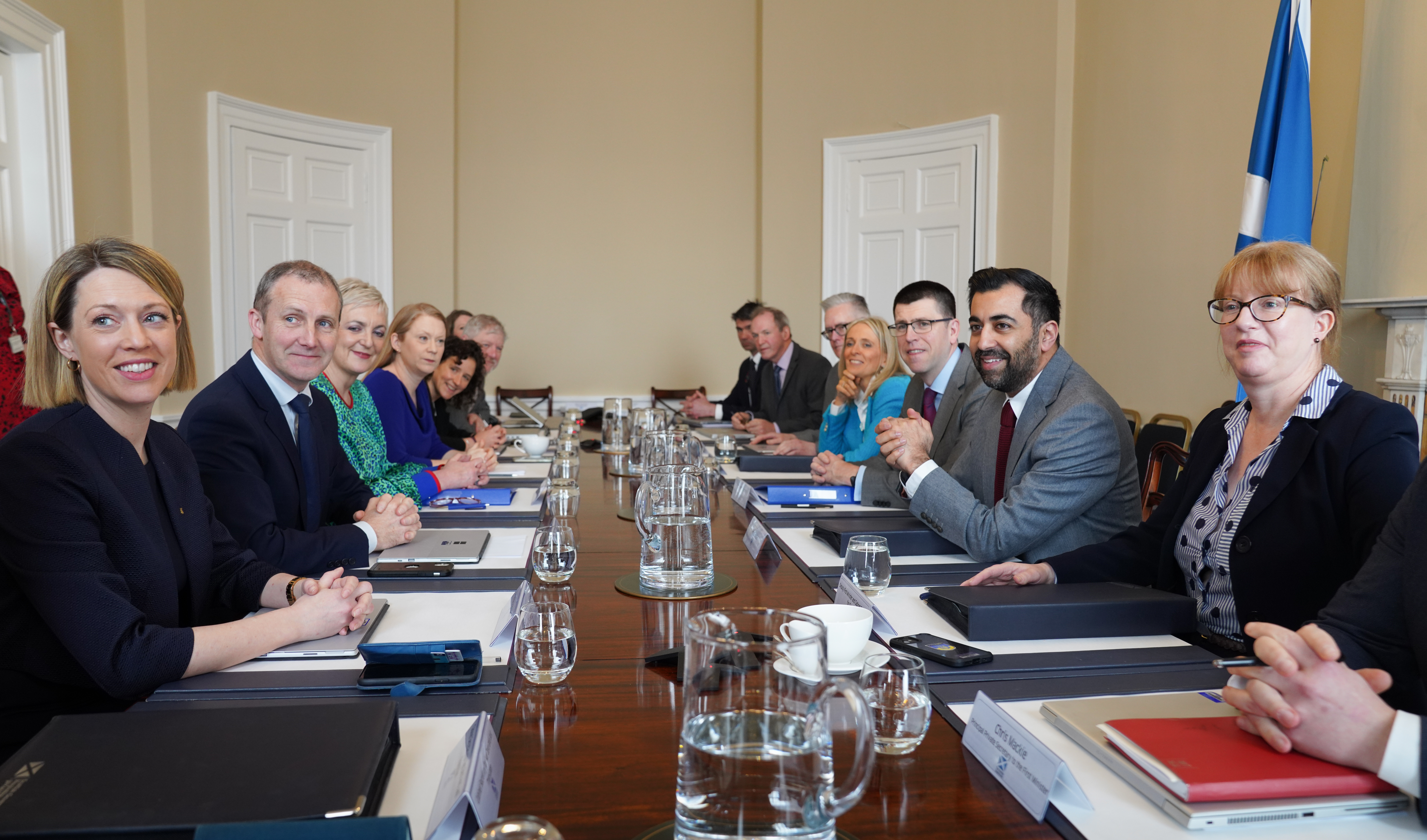
The First Minister is responsible for chairing the Scottish Cabinet

Following their appointment, the first minister then nominates ministers to sit in the Scottish Cabinet and junior ministers to form the Scottish Government. They are then formally elected by the Scottish Parliament. Ministers hold office at His Majesty's Pleasure and may be removed from office, at any time, by the first minister. The first minister also has the power to appoint the law officers and chief legal officers of the Scottish Government – the Lord Advocate and the solicitor general but only with the support of the Scottish Parliament.

=== Accountability to parliament ===
The first minister is responsible to the Scottish Parliament for their actions and the actions of the overall Scottish Government. MSPs can scrutinise the activities of the first minister and their Cabinet by tabling written questions or by asking oral questions in the Scottish Parliament. Direct questioning of the first minister takes place at First Minister's Questions (FMQs) each Thursday at noon when Parliament is sitting. The 30-minute session enables MSPs to ask questions of the first minister, on any issue. The leaders of the largest opposition parties have an allocation of questions and are allowed to question the first minister each week. Opposition leaders normally ask an opening question to the first minister, relating to their meeting with the Scottish Cabinet, or when they next expect to meet the Prime Minister, and then follow this up by asking a supplementary question on an issue of their choosing.

In addition to direct questioning, the first minister is also able to deliver oral statements to the Scottish Parliament chamber, after which members are invited to question the first minister on the substance of the statement. For example, at the beginning of each parliamentary term, the first minister normally delivers a statement, setting out the legislative programme of the Government, or a statement of government priorities over the forthcoming term.

=== International and foreign relations ===
==== Foreign policy ====
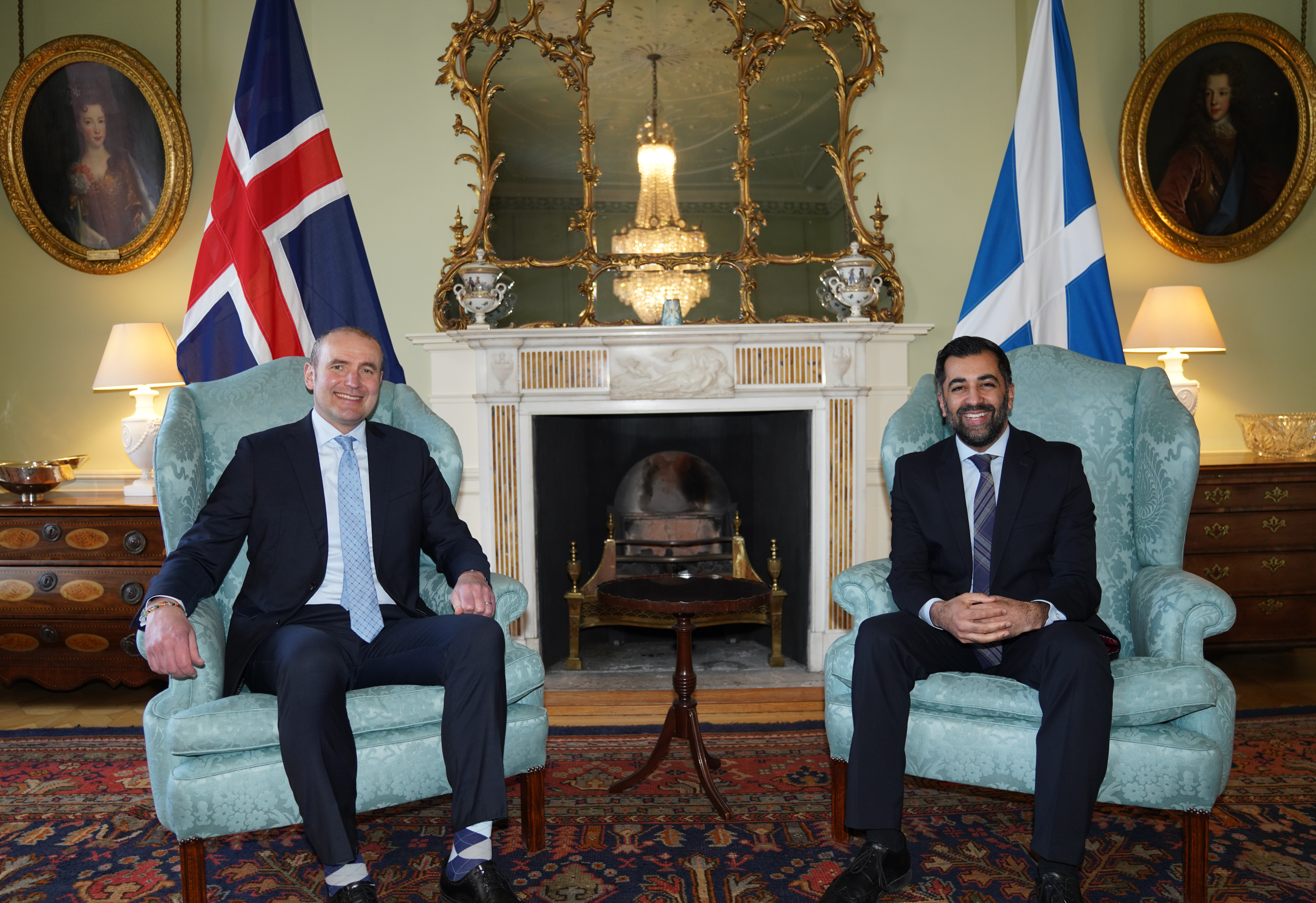
First Minister Humza Yousaf with President of Iceland, Guðni Th. Jóhannesson, at Bute House

Whilst foreign policy remains a reserved matter, the Scottish Government, and the First Minister, are able to promote the economy of the country and Scottish interests internationally and encourage foreign businesses, international devolved, regional and central governments to invest in Scotland.

Whilst the first minister usually undertakes a number of international visits to promote Scotland, international relations, European and Commonwealth relations are also included within the portfolios of the Cabinet Secretary for Culture, Tourism and External Affairs (responsible for international development) and the Minister for International Development and Europe (responsible for European Union relations and international relations).

Overall accountability for intergovernmental relations is the responsibility of the First Minister.

==== International relations ====
During Donald Dewar's tenure as First Minister, he made a total of five international visits – Belgium, Republic of Ireland, Netherlands, Japan and another in Ireland – before his death in October 2000. Henry McLeish conducted six international visits – Italy, three in Belgium, United States of America, Finland, and a joint visit to Japan and Taiwan. McLeish led the Scottish Executive's response to the September 11 attacks in the United States. He was initially concerned about Scotland's defence strategy and feared the country's major cities, such as Glasgow, Edinburgh and Aberdeen, would be targets based on their economic strength and significance to the Scottish, UK and European economies.

On September 13, 2001, McLeish moved a motion in the Scottish Parliament to send condolences to the people of the United States and New York. Through the motion, McLeish said "the Parliament condemns the senseless and abhorrent acts of terrorism carried out in the United States yesterday and extends our deepest sympathies to those whose loved ones have been killed or injured". Henry McLeish's successor, Jack McConnell engaged in a total of 28 international visits during his tenure as First Minister between 2001 and 2007. McConnell carried out international engagements in Ireland, five in the United States, eight in Belgium, South Africa, two in Italy, Austria, three in France, Germany, Greece, the Netherlands, China, Malawi, Canada and Australia. McConnell spearheaded the establishment of the Scotland Malawi Partnership in 2004, which co-ordinates the activities of Scottish individuals and organisations with existing links to Malawi, and aims to foster further links between both countries.

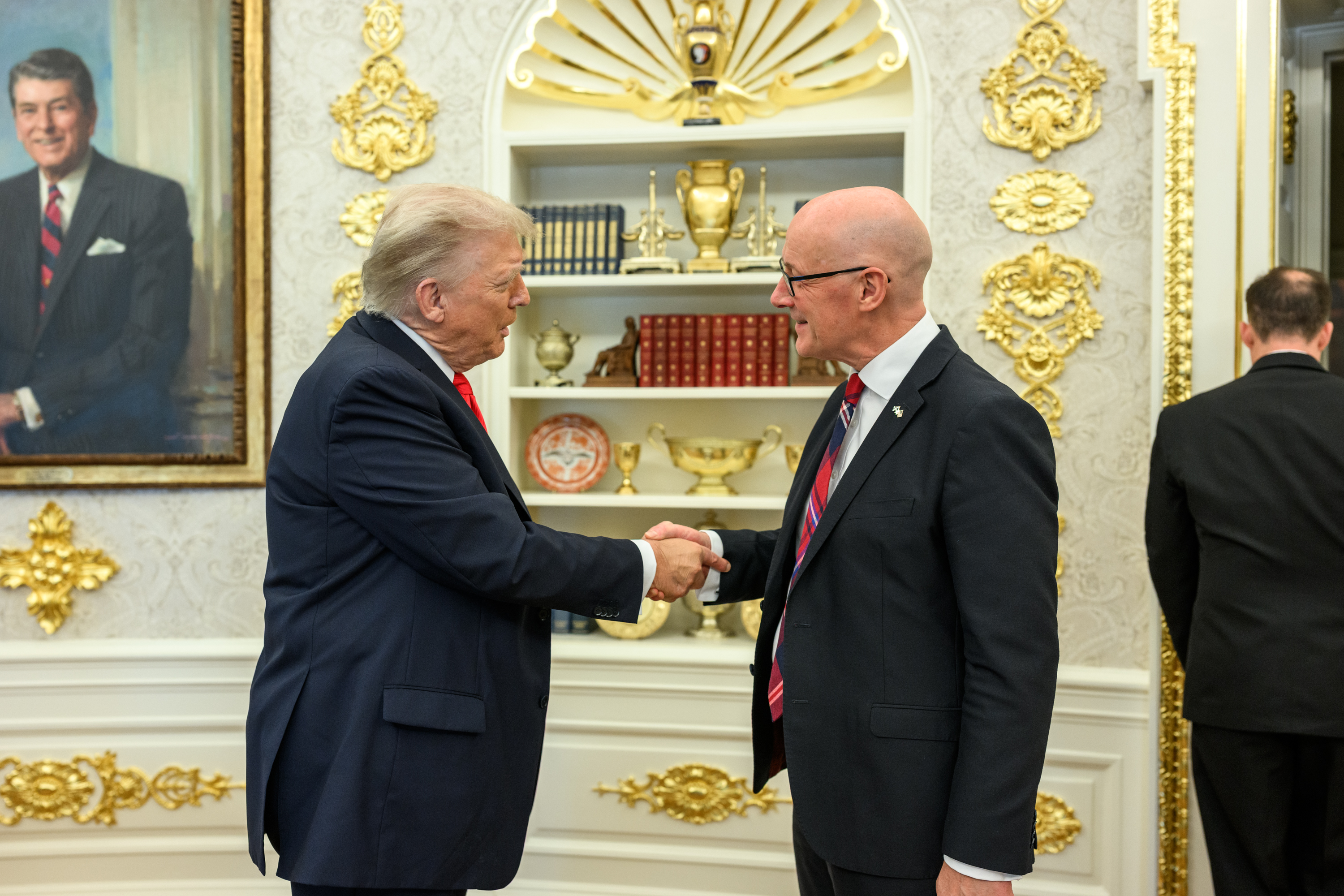
First Minister John Swinney meets with US President, Donald Trump, in the Oval Office at the White House, September 2025

Alex Salmond, Scotland's fourth First Minister from 2007 to 2014, engaged in a total of twenty overseas visits during his tenure as First Minister. Salmond's international engagements included visits to Belgium, five in the United States, Sri Lanka, three in Ireland, Spain, Hong Kong, two in China, Denmark, Guernsey, two in the Isle of Man, Norway and India. In response to the Brexit vote, first minister Nicola Sturgeon travelled to Brussels to meet with both Jean-Claude Juncker, the President of the European Commission as well as Martin Schulz, the President of the European Parliament, to discuss Scotland's future within the European Union. Sturgeon's successor, Humza Yousaf's first international visit as First Minister was to Brussels in June 2023, which, during a three-day visit, sought to set out his "vision for a meaningful and mutually beneficial relationship" between Scotland and the European Union. Yousaf declared his desire to set up a permanent Scottish Government envoy to the European Union in Brussels to "aid the cause of independence".

First minister John Swinney, who succeeded Humza Yousaf in May 2024, welcomed President of Zambia, Hakainde Hichilema, to Bute House in Edinburgh in June 2024 for a series of "high–level engagements", including strengthening bilateral relations between Zambia and Scotland, economic cooperation, education, and sustainable development. During a visit to Germany in June 2024, Swinney met with the British Ambassador to Germany, Jill Gallard, and visited Munich in order to promote Scotland, Scottish culture and tourism.

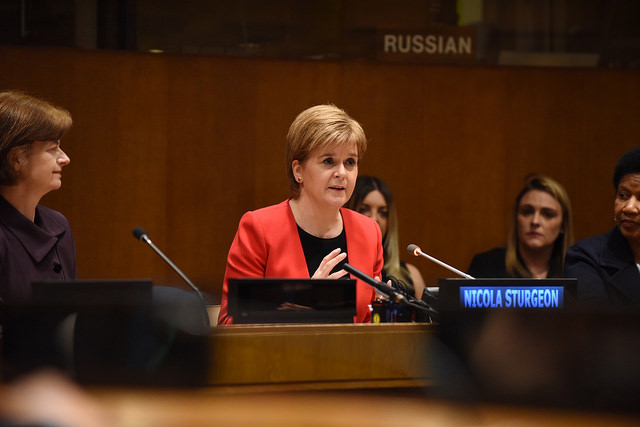
Nicola Sturgeon addressing the United Nations

==== Membership bodies ====
The first minister is a member of the Prime Minister and Heads of Devolved Governments Council, the Council of Nations and Regions and Conference of European Regions with Legislative Power (REGLEG). During the premiership of Jack McConnell, Scotland held the presidency of REGLEG between 2003 and 2004. Other cabinet secretaries and junior ministers within the Scottish Government participate in tier two (the Inter-ministerial Standing Committee) and tier 3 (the Inter-ministerial Group) of The Council which may include areas including education, finance and economy, investment and trade and rural affairs.

The First Minister represents Scotland at the annual British-Irish Council summits. Incumbent first ministers also attend meetings of the United Nations on occasions. First minister Nicola Sturgeon addressed the United Nations General Assembly on the issue of gender equality and the role of women in conflict resolution in April 2017. Additionally, Sturgeon addressed the 2017 United Nations Climate Change Conference.

=== Deputy and 'Acting' First Minister ===
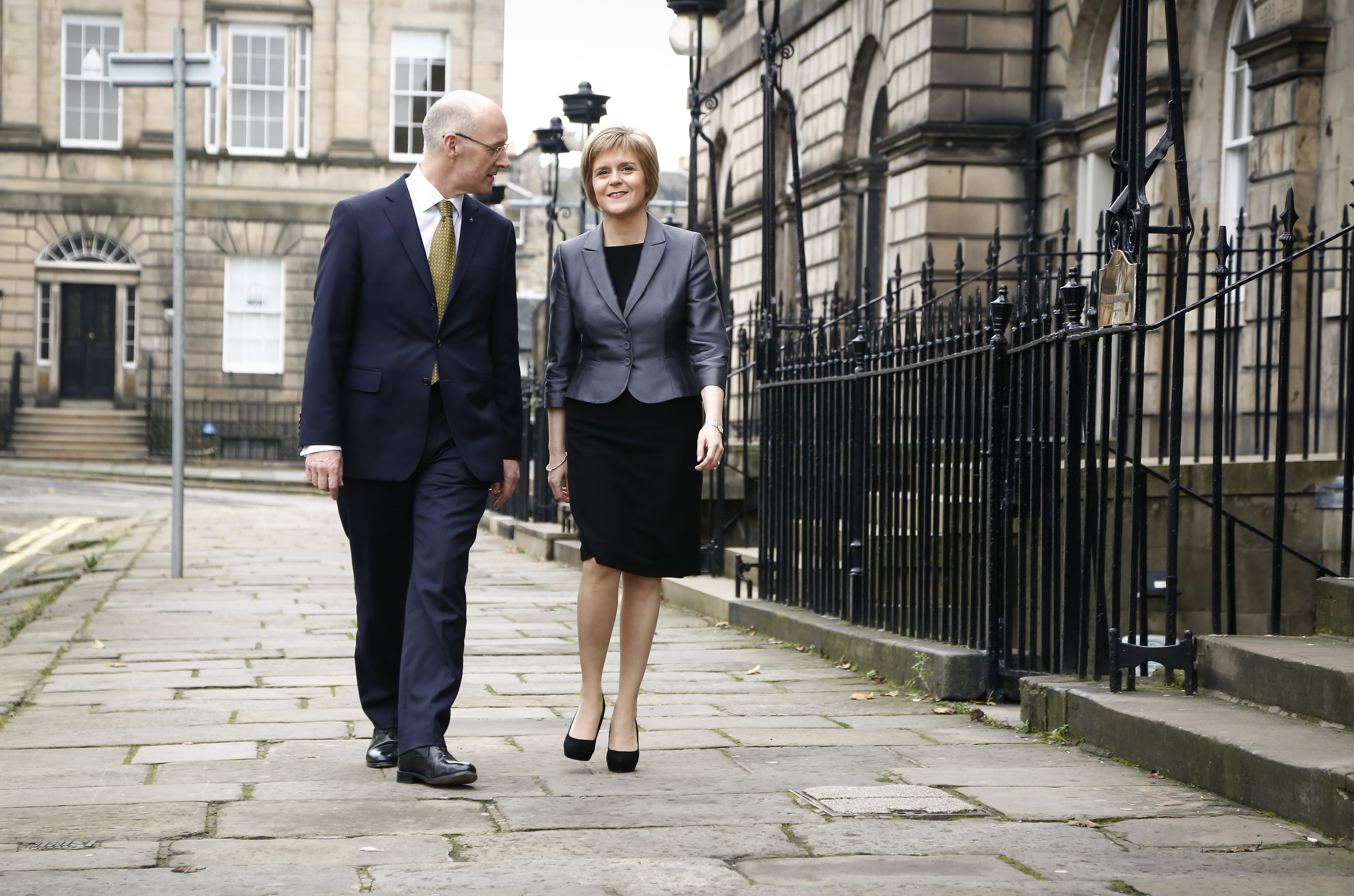
The first minister is supported by the deputy first minister

Associated with the office of first minister, there is also the post of deputy first minister. Unlike the office of first minister, the post of deputy is not recognised in statute and confers no extra status on the holder. Like the first minister, the deputy first minister is an elected member of the Scottish Parliament and a member of the Scottish Government. From 1999 to 2007, when Scotland was governed by a Labour–Liberal Democrat coalition, the leader of the Liberal Democrats – the junior government party – was given the role of deputy first minister; a title which they held in conjunction with another ministerial portfolio. For example, Nicol Stephen, deputy first minister from 2005 to 2007, simultaneously held the post of Minister for Enterprise and Lifelong Learning.

On two occasions since 1999, the deputy first minister has assumed the role of 'acting' first minister, inheriting the powers of the first minister in their absence or incapacitation. From 11 October 2000 to 26 October 2000, following the death in office of the then First Minister Donald Dewar, his deputy Jim Wallace became acting first minister, until the Labour party appointed a new leader, and consequently first minister. Wallace also became Acting First Minister between 8 November 2001 and 22 November 2001, following the resignation of Henry McLeish.

An officer with such a title need not always exist; rather, the existence of the post is dependent on the form of Cabinet organisation preferred by the first minister and their party. The deputy first minister does not automatically succeed if a vacancy in the premiership is suddenly created. It may be necessary for the deputy to stand in for the first minister on occasion, for example by taking the floor at First Minister's Questions.

=== Precedence and privileges ===
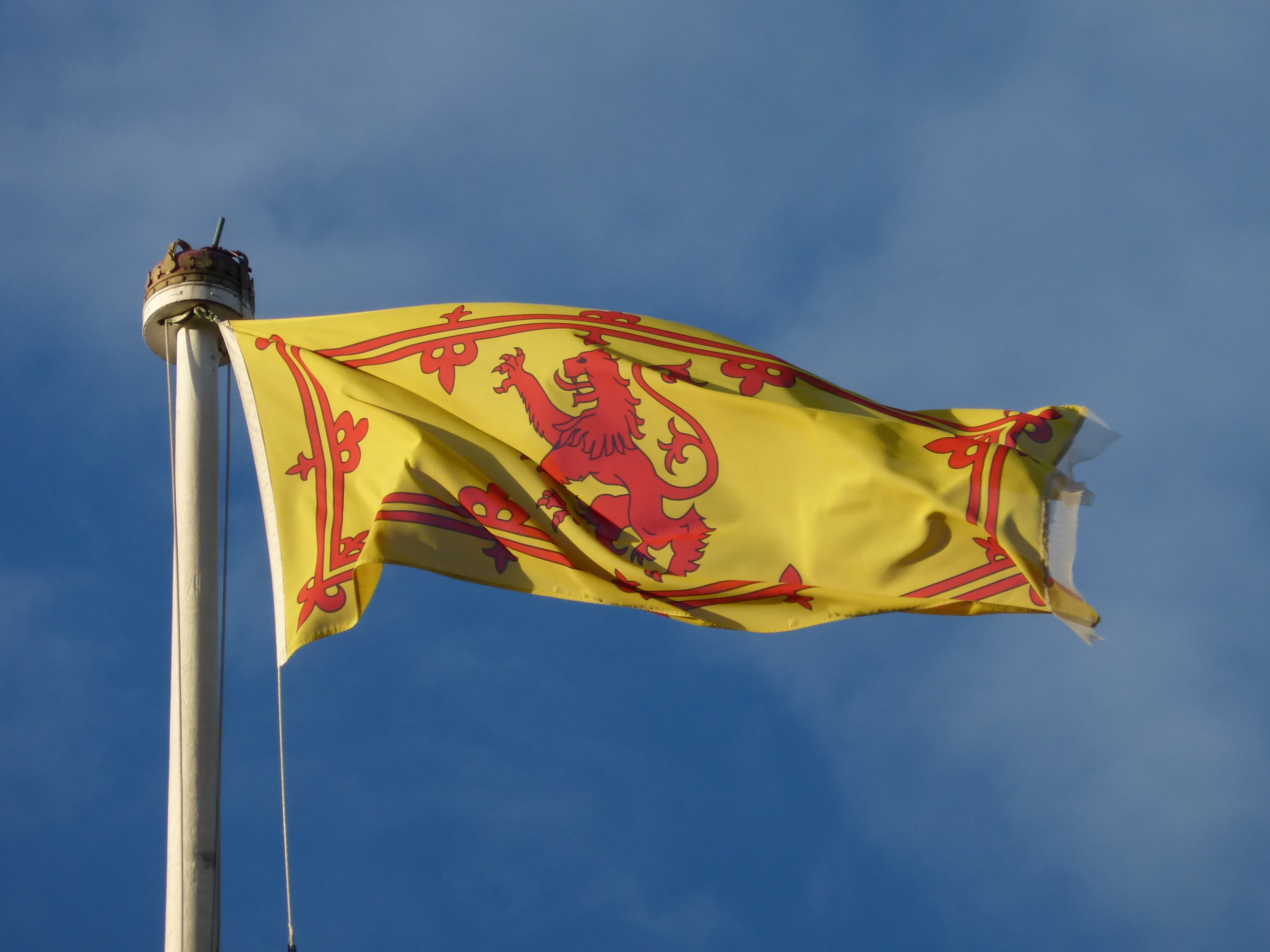
The first minister as ex officio the keeper of the Great Seal of Scotland is permitted to fly the Royal Banner of Scotland.

The first minister is, by virtue of section 45(7) of the Scotland Act 1998, ex officio the keeper of the Great Seal of Scotland and their place in the order of precedence in Scotland is determined by the holding of that office. The scale of precedence in Scotland was amended by royal warrant on 30 June 1999 to take account of devolution and the establishment of the post of first minister. The amended scale reflected the transfer of the office of keeper of the Great Seal from the secretary of state for Scotland to the first minister and also created a rank for the presiding officer of the Scottish Parliament. Throughout Scotland, the first minister outranks all others except the royal family, lord lieutenants, the sheriff principal, the Lord Chancellor, the moderator of the General Assembly of the Church of Scotland, the prime minister of the United Kingdom, the speaker of the House of Commons and the Lord Speaker. As keeper of the Great Seal, the first minister is entitled to fly the Royal Banner of Scotland.

As of April 2015, the first minister is entitled to draw a total salary of £144,687, which is composed of a basic MSP salary of £59,089 plus an additional salary of £85,598 for the role as first minister. This can be compared to the UK Prime Minister who is entitled to draw a total salary of £142,500, composed of a basic MP salary of £67,060 and an additional office holder's salary of £75,440 (the total entitlement for the prime minister had peaked at £198,661 in April 2011 but this was then dropped by around 25%). The first minister is the highest paid member of the Scottish Government. Sturgeon said she would claim £135,605, £9,082 less than her entitlement, as part of a voluntary pay freeze pegging her salary to 2008/09 levels.

The first minister traditionally resides at Bute House which is located at number 6 Charlotte Square in the New Town of Edinburgh. The house became the property of the National Trust for Scotland in 1966, after the death of the previous owner John Crichton-Stuart, 4th Marquess of Bute and remains in the ownership of the National Trust for Scotland. Prior to devolution, Bute House was the official residence of the Secretary of State for Scotland. Weekly meetings of the Scottish Cabinet take place in the Cabinet room of the house. Bute House is also where the first minister holds press conferences, hosts visiting dignitaries and employs and dismisses government Ministers. The Office of the First Minister is located at St Andrews House in Edinburgh.

Appointments to the Privy Council of the United Kingdom are made by the monarch. Once appointed, the first minister joins the Privy Council and advises the monarch on exercising their statutory and prerogative powers. To date all first ministers have been appointed members of the Privy Council, and therefore entitled to use the style 'Right Honourable'. Additionally, as the leader of the Scottish Government, the first minister and monarch have a private audience where they discuss issues relating to Scotland and the workings of the Scottish Government.

Privileges of office of First Minister

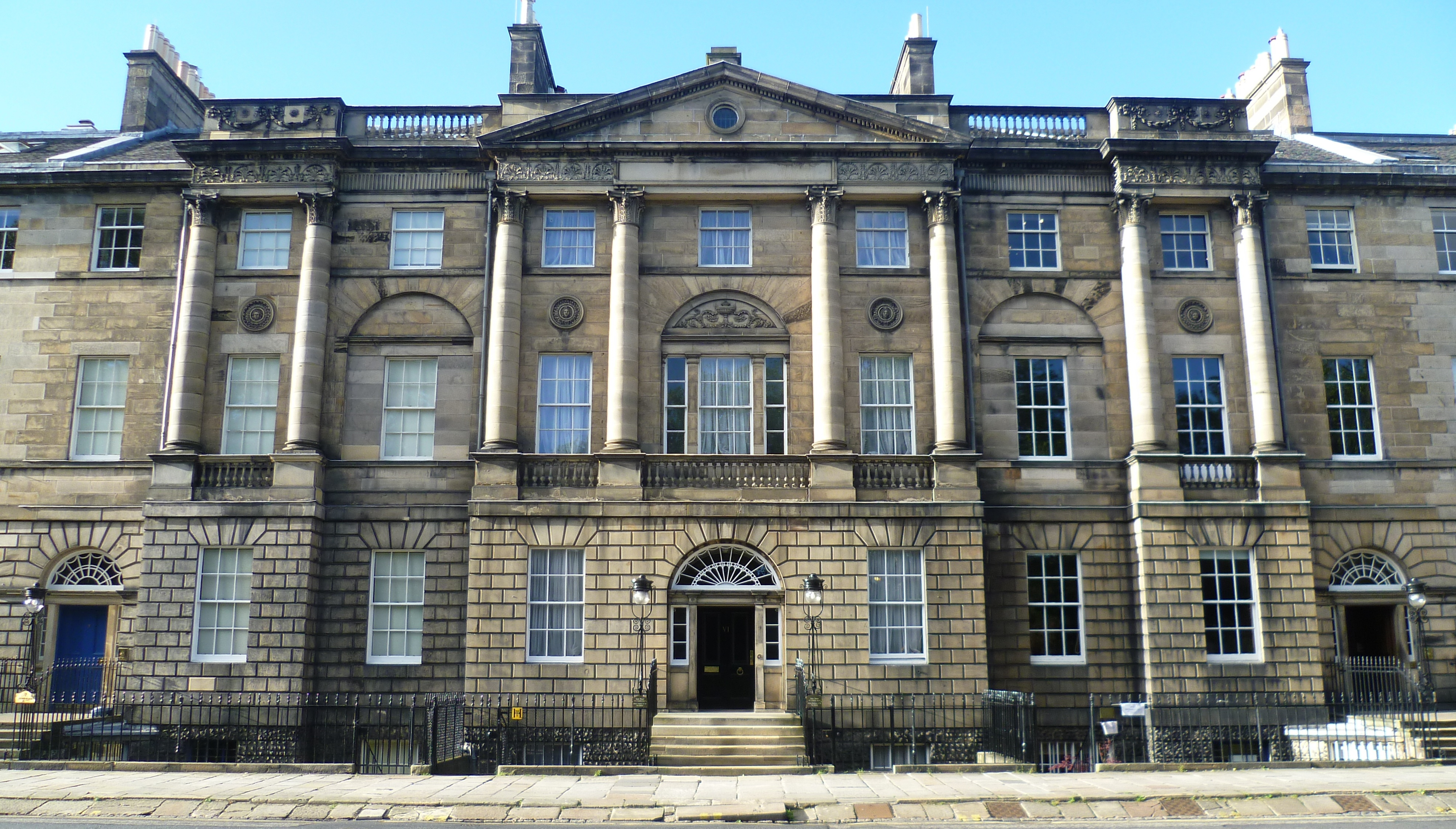
Official Residence, Bute House at 6 Charlotte Square in Edinburgh

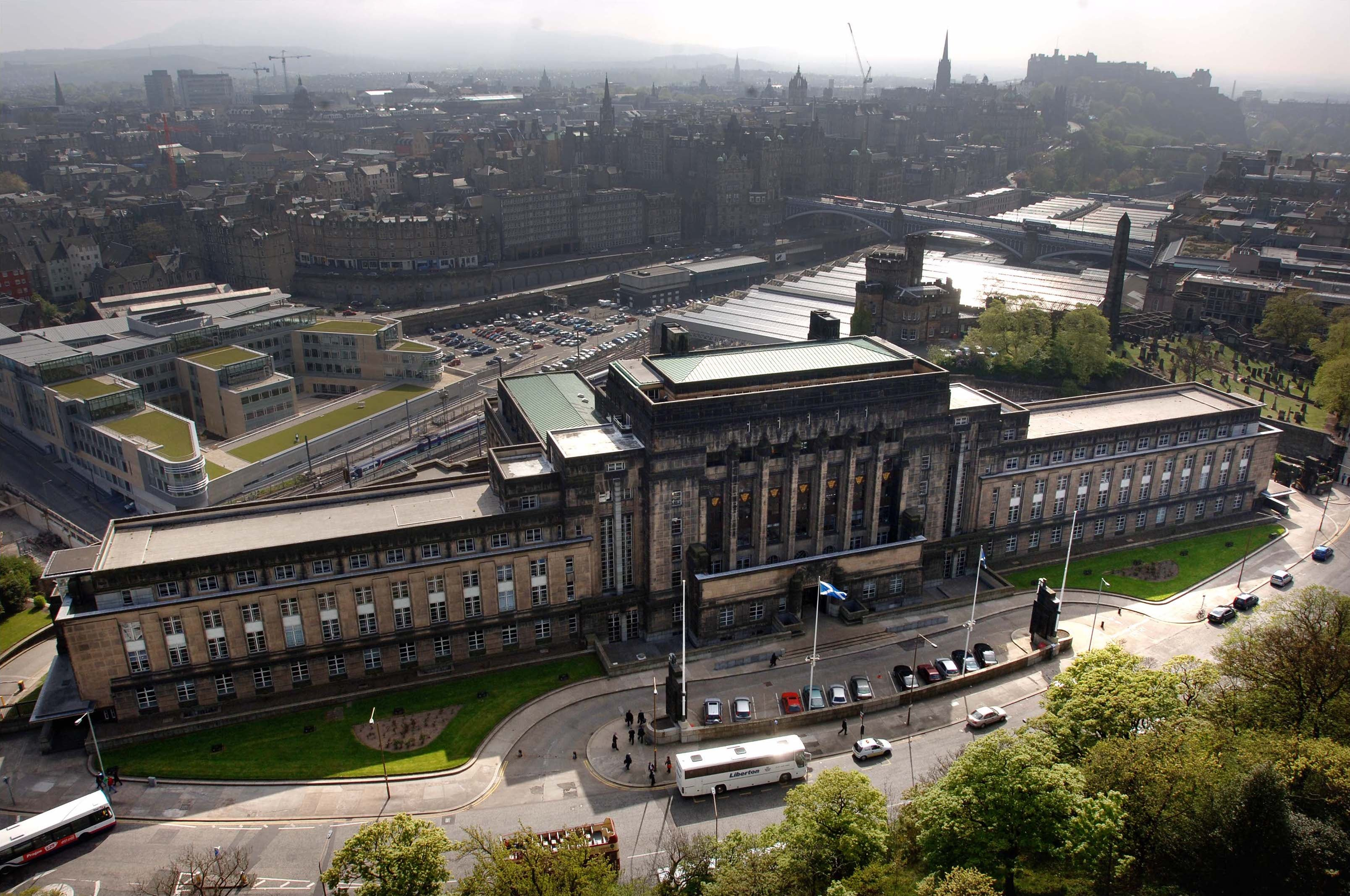
The First Minister has an office at St Andrew's House

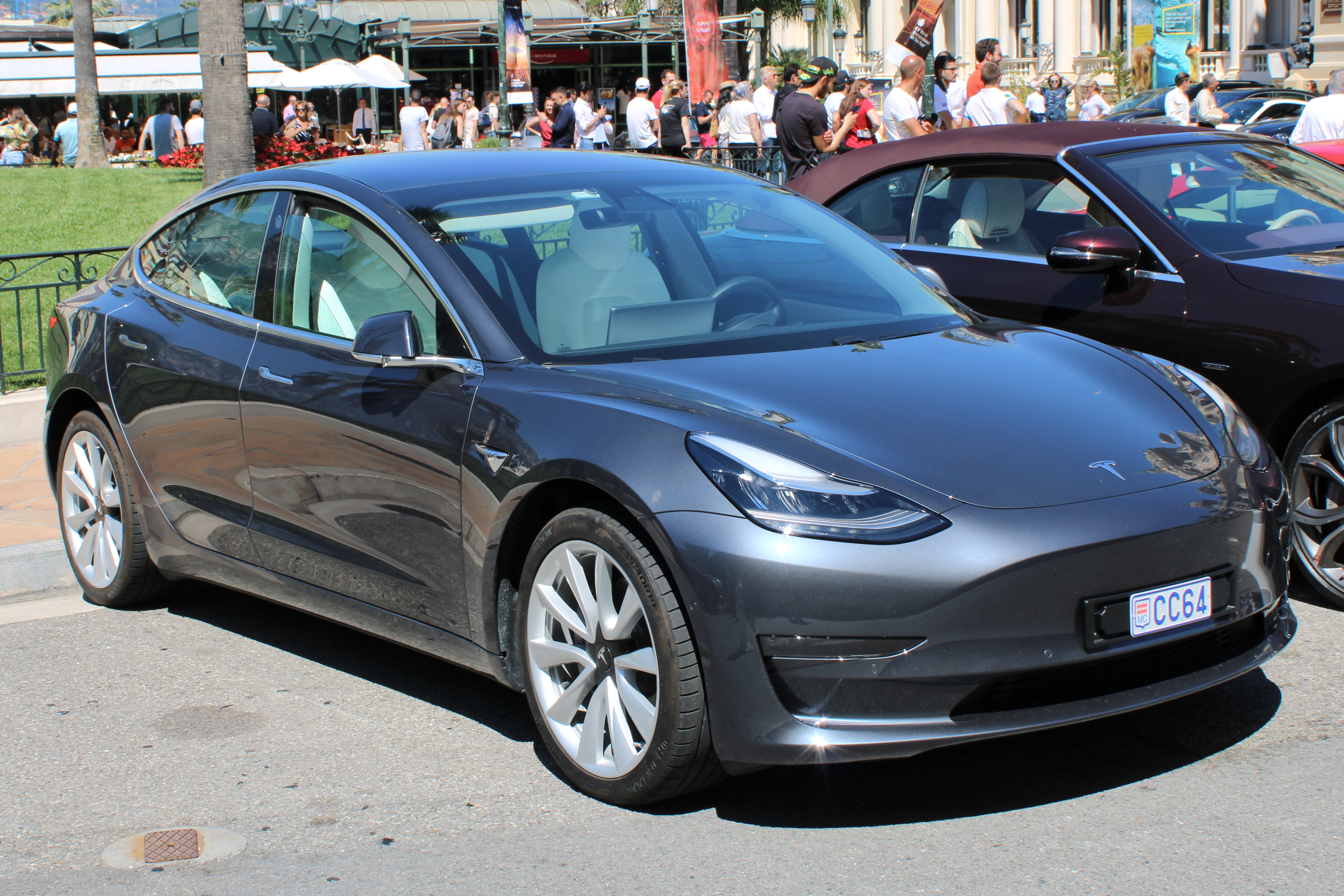
One of the vehicles used by the Office of the First Minister, the Tesla Model 3

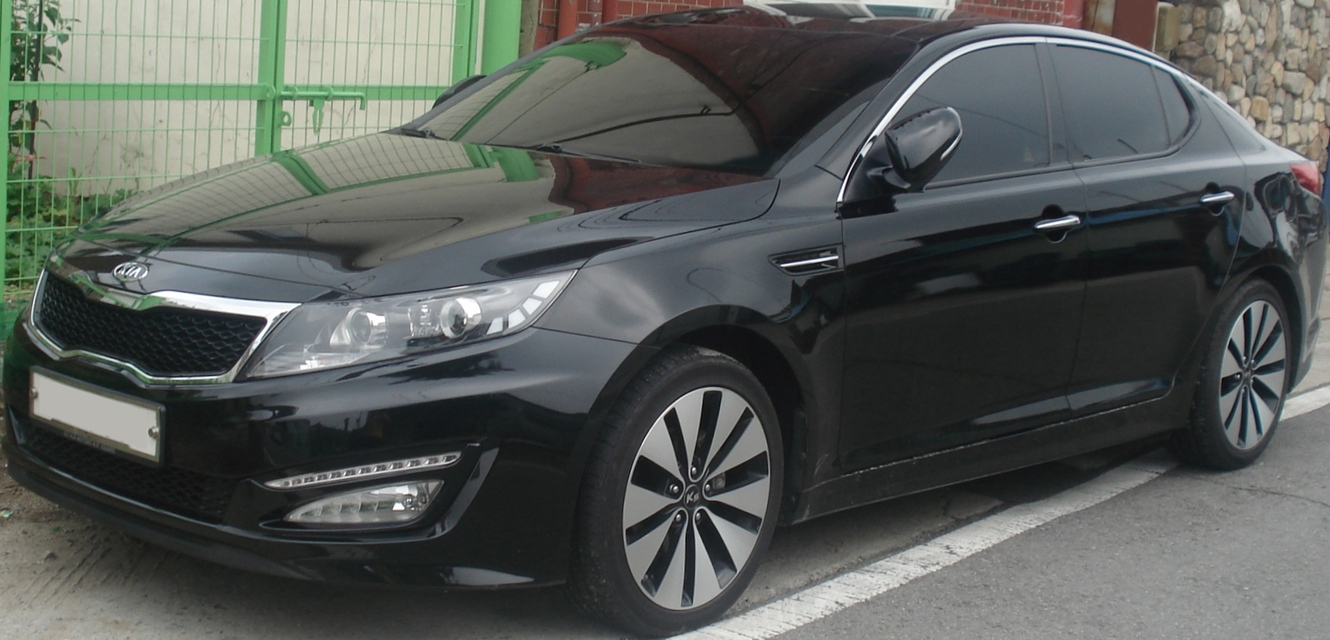
The First Minister, and other ministers, also use the Kia Optima

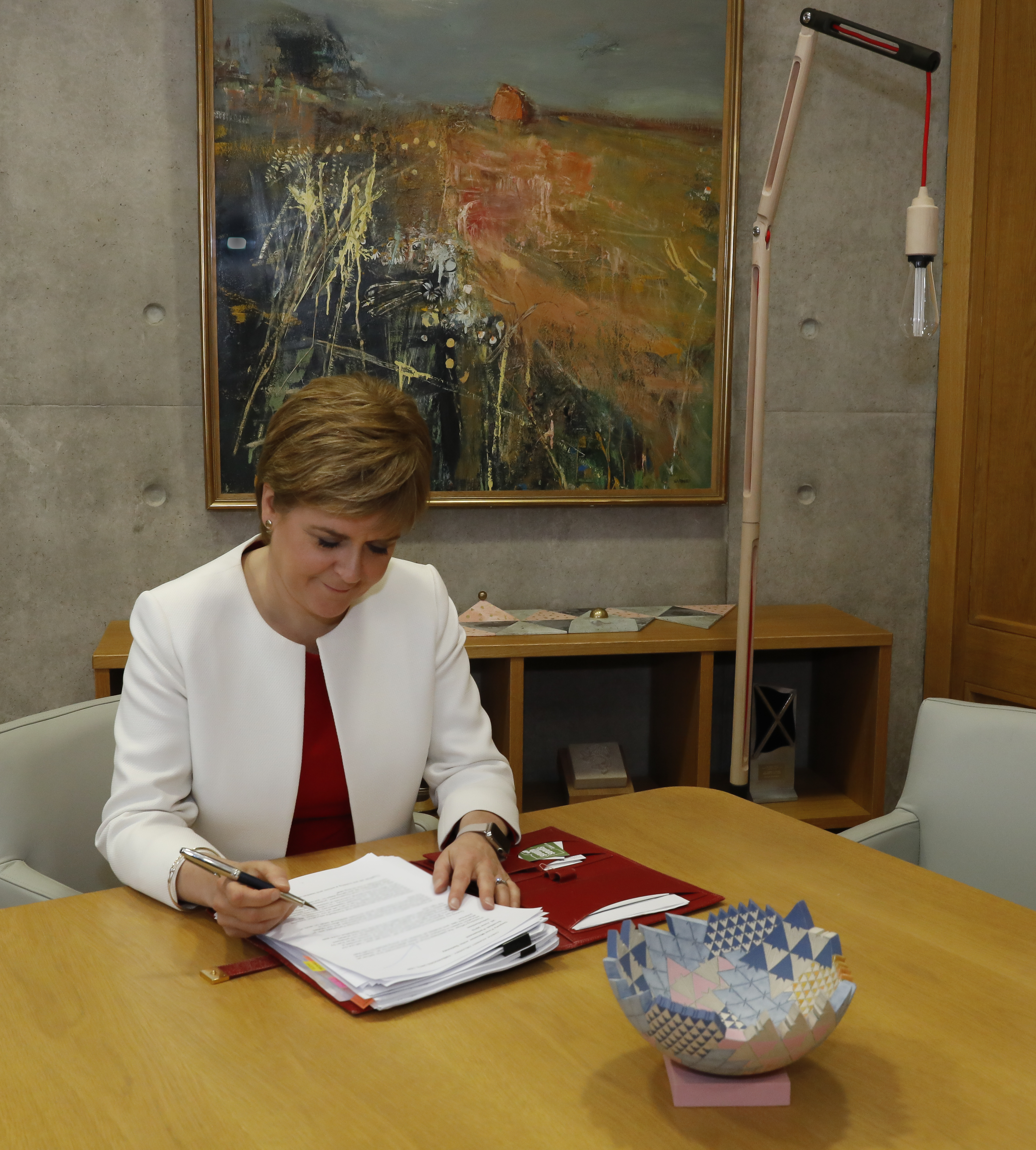
The First Minister has an office within the Scottish Parliament building

== List of nominating elections ==
Party key	Scottish Conservatives
Party key	Scottish Labour
Party key	Scottish Liberal Democrats
Party key	Scottish National Party
Party key	Scottish Greens
Party key	Scottish Socialist Party
Party key	Reform UK Scotland
Party key	Independent

First Minister nominative elections
Parliamentary term	Date	Candidates	Votes received		
Parliamentary term	Date	Candidates	1st round	2nd round	3rd round
1st Parliament	13 May 1999	Donald Dewar	71		
1st Parliament	13 May 1999	Alex Salmond	35		
1st Parliament	13 May 1999	David McLetchie	17		
1st Parliament	13 May 1999	Dennis Canavan	3		
1st Parliament	26 October 2000	Henry McLeish	68		
1st Parliament	26 October 2000	John Swinney	33		
1st Parliament	26 October 2000	David McLetchie	19		
1st Parliament	26 October 2000	Dennis Canavan	3		
1st Parliament	22 November 2001	Jack McConnell	70		
1st Parliament	22 November 2001	John Swinney	34		
1st Parliament	22 November 2001	David McLetchie	19		
1st Parliament	22 November 2001	Dennis Canavan	3		
2nd Parliament	15 May 2003	Jack McConnell	67		
2nd Parliament	15 May 2003	John Swinney	26		
2nd Parliament	15 May 2003	David McLetchie	18		
2nd Parliament	15 May 2003	Robin Harper	6		
2nd Parliament	15 May 2003	Tommy Sheridan	6		
2nd Parliament	15 May 2003	Dennis Canavan	2		
2nd Parliament	15 May 2003	Margo MacDonald	2		
3rd Parliament	16 May 2007	Alex Salmond	49	49	
3rd Parliament	16 May 2007	Jack McConnell	46	46	
3rd Parliament	16 May 2007	Annabel Goldie	16	Eliminated	
3rd Parliament	16 May 2007	Nicol Stephen	16	Eliminated	
4th Parliament	18 May 2011	Alex Salmond	68		
4th Parliament	19 November 2014	Nicola Sturgeon	66		
4th Parliament	19 November 2014	Ruth Davidson	15		
5th Parliament	17 May 2016	Nicola Sturgeon	63		
5th Parliament	17 May 2016	Willie Rennie	5		
6th Parliament	18 May 2021	Nicola Sturgeon	64		
6th Parliament	18 May 2021	Douglas Ross	31		
6th Parliament	18 May 2021	Willie Rennie	4		
6th Parliament	28 March 2023	Humza Yousaf	71		
6th Parliament	28 March 2023	Douglas Ross	31		
6th Parliament	28 March 2023	Anas Sarwar	22		
6th Parliament	28 March 2023	Alex Cole-Hamilton	4		
6th Parliament	7 May 2024	John Swinney	64		
6th Parliament	7 May 2024	Douglas Ross	31		
6th Parliament	7 May 2024	Anas Sarwar	22		
6th Parliament	7 May 2024	Alex Cole-Hamilton	4		
7th Parliament	19 May 2026	John Swinney	57	57	56
7th Parliament	19 May 2026	Anas Sarwar	17	17	17
7th Parliament	19 May 2026	Malcolm Offord	17	17	17
7th Parliament	19 May 2026	Gillian Mackay	15	13	15
7th Parliament	19 May 2026	Russell Findlay	12	11	Eliminated
7th Parliament	19 May 2026	Alex Cole-Hamilton	10	Eliminated	

== See also ==
- List of current heads of government in the United Kingdom and dependencies

== Notes ==
Order of precedence in Scotland
Preceded by Speaker of the House of Commons	Order of Precedence (gentlemen)	Succeeded by Presiding Officer of the Scottish Parliament
