= Exchequer Directorates =

The Exchequer Directorates of the Scottish Government are a group of directorates of the Scottish Government. The Exchequer Directorate is headed by Alyson Stafford CBE was appointed in July 2017. The Director General of the Scottish Exchequer Directorate is solely responsible for the overall setting, overview and implementing of the Scottish Budget, including tax, spending of the Scottish Government and measuring performance, and for any advice and support, as well as for the systems on finance and procurement. The Director-General of the Exchequer Directorate is a member of the Scottish Government's Corporate Governance Board.

== Current Directorates ==
The Exchequer Directorate currently consists of the following four directorates of which it is responsible for:

- Budget and Public Spending Directorate
- Fiscal Sustainability and Exchequer Development Directorate
- Internal Audit and Assurance Directorate
- Tax and Revenues Directorate

== See also ==
- Economy of Scotland
- Scottish budget
  - Cabinet Secretary for Finance
