= Corporate Directorates =

The Scottish Government Corporate Directorates are a group of Directorates of the Scottish Government. The Directorates are headed by Lesley Fraser, who was appointed to the interim role Director-General (DG) for Organisational Development and Operations in July 2019, before the role became Director-General Corporate in March 2021. Primarily, DG Corporate is solely responsible for the organisational improvements of the Scottish Government and its associated Cabinet Secretaries and Ministers. The responsibilities of the role include people and capability, staff engagement, ministerial support, communications, digital, legal services, facilities and estates, financial management, commercial and procurement functions.

As a result of their responsibilities and supporting nature of the work of the Scottish Government and its members, the Director-General Corporate is a member of the Scottish Government's Corporate Governance Board.

== Current directorates ==
DG Corporate is currently responsible for the following directorates:

- Communications and Ministerial Support Directorate
- Corporate Transformation and Workplace Directorate
- Covid Inquiries Response Directorate
- Digital Directorate
- Financial Management Directorate
- Legal Services (Solicitor to the Scottish Government)
- People Directorate
- Propriety and Ethics Directorate
- Scottish Procurement and Property Directorate

== See also ==
- Directorates of the Scottish Government
  - Scottish Government
  - Scottish cabinet
