= Elisabeth Jones =

Welsh lawyer

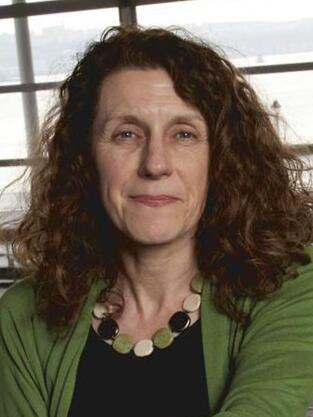
Official portrait, 2024

Elisabeth Velina Jones (born 1959/1960) is a Welsh lawyer who served as the Counsel General-designate for Wales from 7 August 2024 to 11 September 2024 and has also served as legal adviser to the Senedd.

== Early life and education ==
Jones was born in Mountain Ash. She attended Mountain Ash Comprehensive School. Jones studied French and German at Somerville College, Oxford, and studied for an LLM at the University of Bristol.

== Career ==
Jones initially worked in commercial and employment law in the City of London at the firm Theodore Goddard and at Bristol at the firm Osborne Clarke and Lyons Davidson. She also worked giving free legal advice at the Gloucester Law Centre. She later worked at the European Court of Human Rights.

In 2012, she was appointed Chief Legal Advisor to the National Assembly for Wales. She served in this role until 2019.

In 2024, she was appointed as Counsel General-designate in the Eluned Morgan government on "an interim basis". She replaced Vaughan Gething, who had appointed himself to the role after Mick Antoniw resigned from the cabinet. She had specific statutory functions in that role, including in relation to Senedd Cymru Bills. However, as she was not an elected Minister, any ministerial powers associated with the role had to be executed by a sitting minister. The Law Society responded to her appointment by calling for a return to a political appointee in the role, saying that the lack of an elected Senedd member in the role presents a risk of loss of political focus around justice in Wales. She is now currently a member of the Legal Wales Executive Committee.

== Personal life ==
Jones has one daughter named Seren.
