= Chief of Staff to the First Minister =

Scottish special adviser

Scotland Chief of Staff to the First Minister
- Scottish Gaelic: Ceannard an Luchd-obrach don Phrìomh Mhinistear
- Logo of the Scottish Government

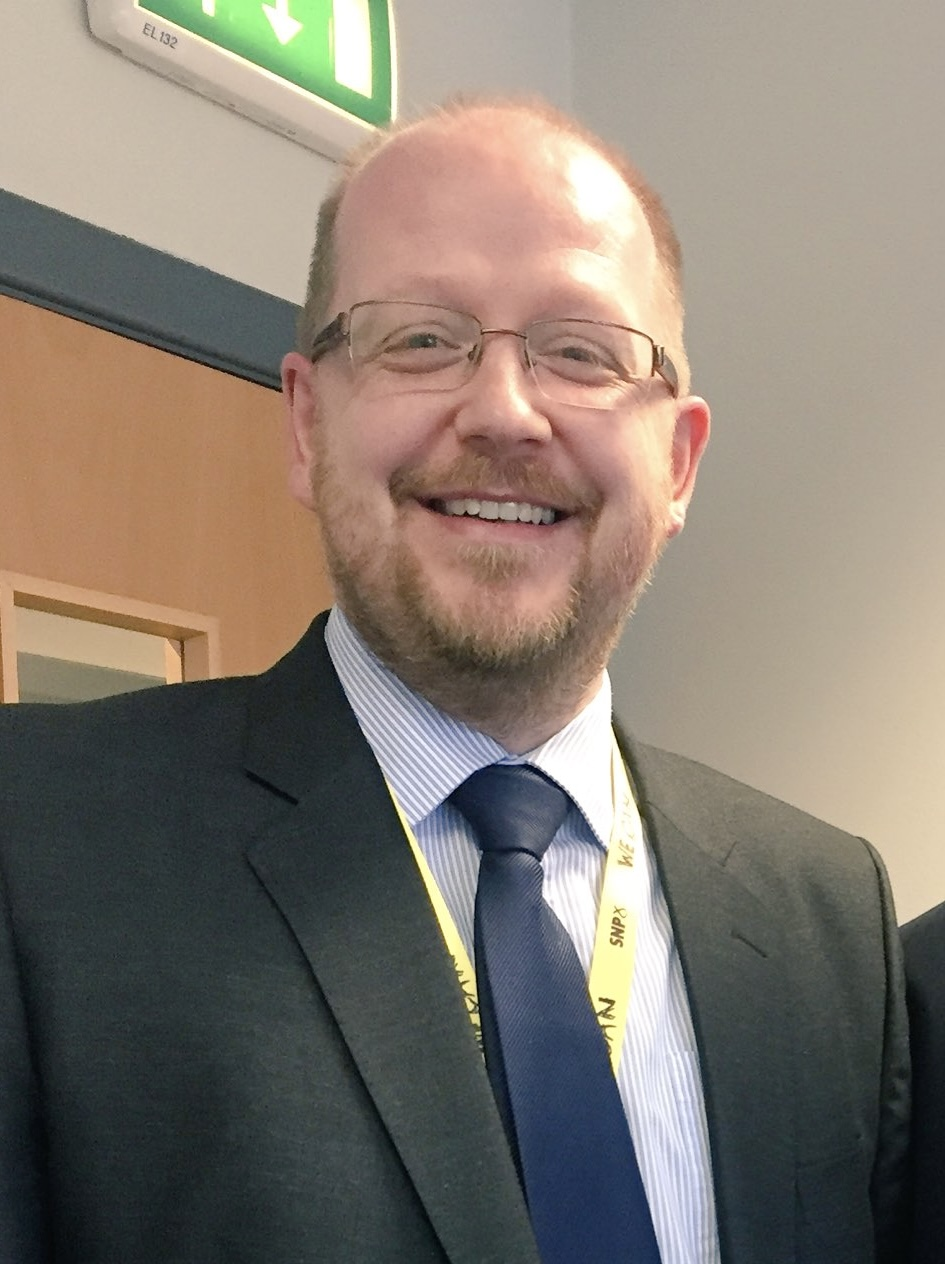
- Incumbent; Colin McAllister since August 2021
- Office of the First Minister
- Abbreviation: COF
- Member of: Scottish Government
- Reports to: First Minister
- Seat: St Andrew's House, 2 Regent Road, Edinburgh, EH1 3DG
- Appointer: First Minister
- Term length: At the First Minister's pleasure
- Inaugural holder: John Rafferty
- Formation: 1999
- Salary: £101,088–£107,149 (estimated 2023)

The Chief of Staff to the First Minister (Scottish Gaelic: Ceannard an Luchd-obrach don Phrìomh Mhinistear) is the principal special adviser to the first minister of Scotland. As chief of staff, the incumbent office holder has access to all portfolio areas within the Scottish Government, and is supported by a number of special advisors such as the Head of Communications and Strategic Political Adviser, Head of Policy and Strategic Political Adviser, Senior Special Adviser and the Senior Constitution Special Adviser.

The post holder of the office is based at St Andrew's House, the headquarters of the Scottish Government in Edinburgh. The incumbent Chief of Staff to the First Minister is Colin McAllister.

== Role ==
The role of the Chief of Staff to the First Minister is principally to support the First Minister in their duties, including the co-ordination of the Special Adviser team within the Scottish Government and Office of the First Minister department. The chief of staff is solely responsible for the strategic programme of the First Minister whilst the First Minister is the head of the government and serves as the special adviser for Finance & the Constitution as well as inter-governmental relations between Scotland and other countries.

Additional responsibilities of the chief of staff to the first minister include being the First Minister's senior intermediary with key internal and external stakeholders, co-ordinator of the Special Adviser team and prior to the 2014 Commonwealth Games held in Glasgow, the chief of staff acted as policy support adviser on the Commonwealth Games and Sport portfolio within the Scottish Government.

Following the 2021 Scottish Parliament elections, then chief of staff, Liz Lloyd, took a period of "leave of absence" from the position and was temporarily replaced by the head of policy of the Scottish Government, Colin McAllister, who assumed the title of Acting Chief of Staff. A spokesperson for the first minister at that time, Nicola Sturgeon, told the media "Liz Lloyd is taking a period of leave following the election. The First Minister has asked Colin McAllister to take on the role as acting Chief of Staff until Ms Lloyd’s return to government". McAllister later became the permanent Chief of Staff to the First Minister following Lloyd's decision to stand down from the role in 2021 after her transfer to the position of First Minister's Strategic Adviser. McAllister previously served as a special adviser to the deputy first minister John Swinney.

== Appointment ==
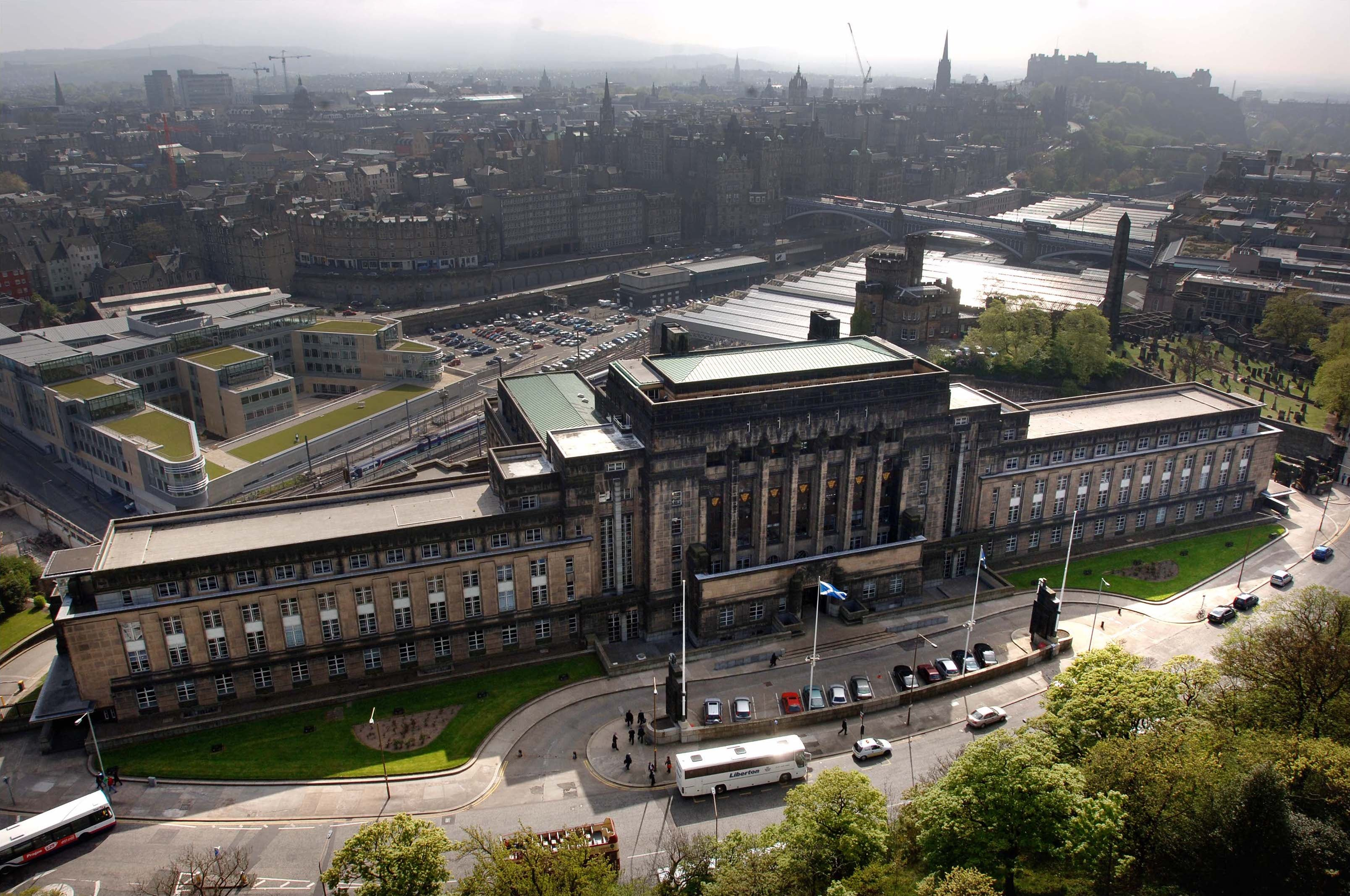
The Chief of Staff is based at St Andrew's House in Edinburgh, the headquarters of the Scottish Government

The incumbent first minister is responsible for all appointments of special advisers within the Scottish Government, including the position of Chief of Staff to the First Minister. Consequently, the first minister is required to prepare an annual report to lay before the Scottish Parliament detailing the number of special advisers and their associated costs. Any special adviser within the Scottish Government, including the chief of staff, is appointed under the terms of Part 1 of the Constitutional Reform and Governance Act 2010. Special advisers within the Scottish Government remain the responsibility of the incumbent first minister whilst in office.

== List of Chiefs of Staff ==
- 1999: John Rafferty
- 1999–2001: Peter MacMahon
- 2001–2007: Mike Donnelly
- 2007–2011: Alex Bell
- 2011–2014: Geoff Aberdein
- 2014–2021: Liz Lloyd
- 2021–present: Colin McAllister

== See also ==
- Chief Special Adviser to the First Minister
- Downing Street Chief of Staff
