= Minister for Europe, External Affairs and Energy =

Portfolio in the Scottish Government

Minister for Europe, External Affairs & Energy
- Scottish Gaelic: Ministear airson Gnothaichean na Pàrlamaid

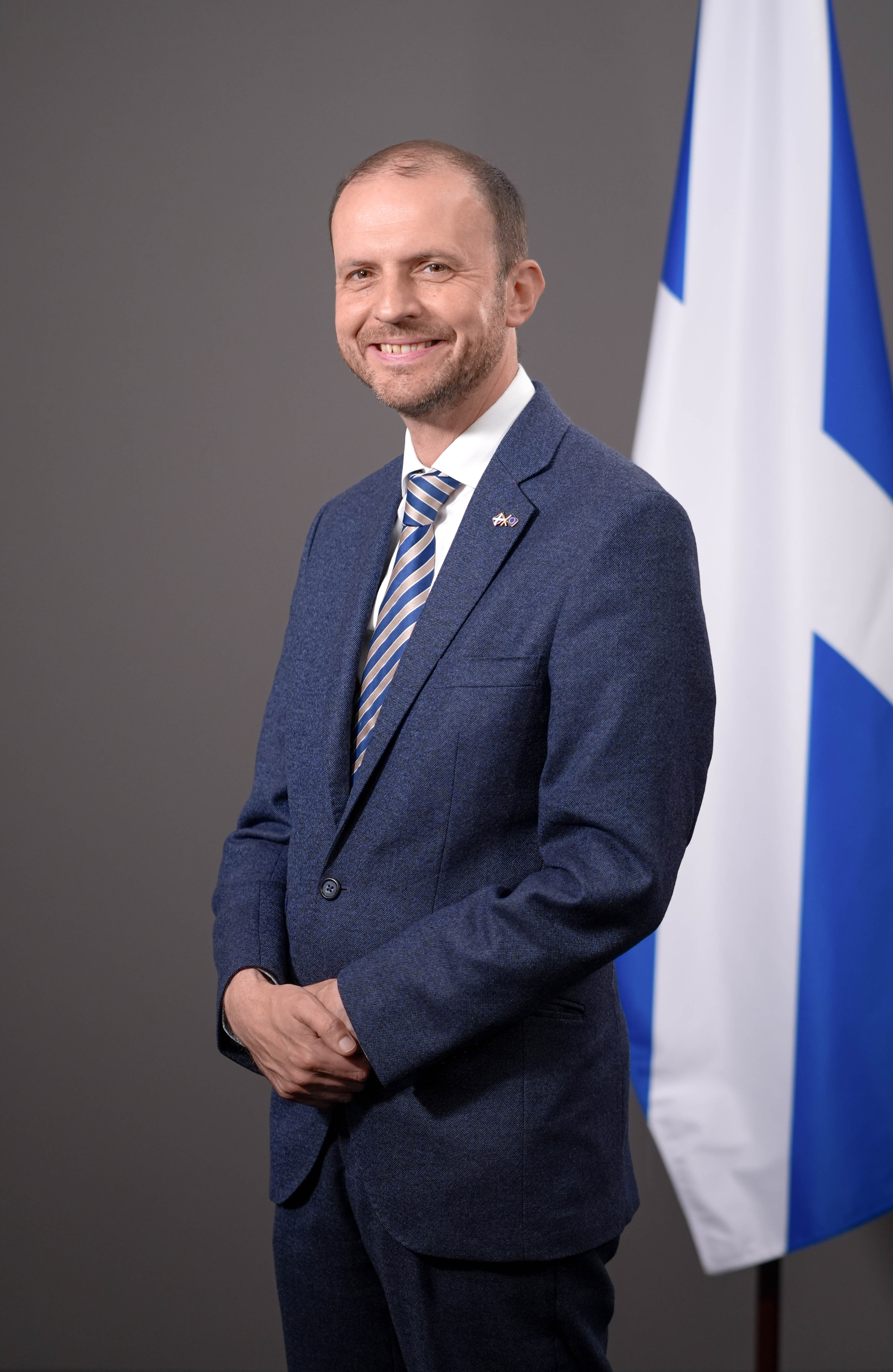
- Incumbent; Stephen Gethins since 21 May 2026
- Style: Minister (within parliament); External Affairs Minister (informal); Scottish External Affairs Minister (outwith Scotland)
- Member of: Scottish Parliament; Scottish Government
- Reports to: Scottish Parliament
- Seat: Edinburgh
- Appointer: First Minister
- Inaugural holder: Linda Fabiani
- Formation: May 2007
- Salary: £106,185 per annum (2024) (including £72,196 MSP salary)
- Website: www.gov.scot

The Minister for Europe, External Affairs & Energy is a junior ministerial post in the Scottish Government. As a result, the minister does not attend the Scottish Cabinet. The minister supported the Cabinet Secretary for the Constitution, Europe and External Affairs, a full member of the cabinet until its abolishment. The current Minister is Stephen Gethins, who was appointed on May 20, 2026.

The post was created in September 2012. The role was modified in February 2020 with migration moving to another post, before being abolished in May 2024 by John Swinney. In May 2026, the post was re-established.

== Overview ==
The specific responsibilities of the minister were:

- International development
- Post-Brexit Relations
- Cross government co-ordination on the European Union
- Fair trade
- Scottish diaspora

== History ==
In September 2012 the position of Minister for External Affairs and International Development was created; the name of the role changed a November 2014 reshuffle when Nicola Sturgeon became First Minister. It was changed again in May 2016, after the 2016 election, and again in June 2018. In May 2024, First Minister John Swinney abolished the role following the formation of his first government. John Swinney brought the office back in use in May 2026, following the formation of his second government as Minister for Europe, External Affairs, and Energy.

== List of office holders ==
The incumbent Minister is Stephen Gethins, who has held the role since May 2026.

Deputy Minister for Culture and Sport
Name	Portrait	Entered office	Left office	Party	First Minister						
Rhona Brankin		19 May 1999	1 November 2000	Scottish Labour Party	Donald Dewar						
Deputy Minister for Environment, Sport and Culture						Deputy Minister for Education, Europe and External Affairs					
Name	Portrait	Entered office	Left office	Party	First Minister	Name	Portrait	Entered office	Left office	Party	First Minister
Allan Wilson		1 November 2000	8 March 2001	Scottish Labour Party	Henry McLeish	Nicol Stephen		1 November 2000	28 November 2001	Scottish Liberal Democrats	Henry McLeish
Deputy Minister for Sport, the Arts and Culture
Allan Wilson		8 March 2001	28 November 2001	Scottish Labour Party	Henry McLeish						
Deputy Minister for Tourism, Culture and Sport
Elaine Murray		28 November 2001	28 November 2002	Labour Party	Jack McConnell						
Minister for Europe, External Affairs and Culture
Linda Fabiani		17 May 2007	10 February 2009	Scottish National Party	Alex Salmond						
Minister for Culture, External Affairs and the Constitution
Michael Russell		10 February 2009	1 December 2009	Scottish National Party	Alex Salmond						
Minister for Culture and External Affairs
Fiona Hyslop		1 December 2009	19 May 2011	Scottish National Party	Alex Salmond						
Minister for External Affairs and International Development
Humza Yousaf		6 September 2012	21 November 2014	Scottish National Party	Alex Salmond						
Minister for Europe and International Development
Humza Yousaf		21 November 2014	18 May 2016	Scottish National Party	Nicola Sturgeon						
Minister for International Development and Europe
Alasdair Allan		18 May 2016	27 June 2018	Scottish National Party	Nicola Sturgeon						
Minister for Europe, Migration and International Development
Ben Macpherson		27 June 2018	17 February 2020	Scottish National Party	Nicola Sturgeon						
Minister for Europe and International Development
Jenny Gilruth		17 February 2020	24 January 2022	Scottish National Party	Nicola Sturgeon						
Minister for Culture, Europe and International Development
Neil Gray		24 January 2022	29 March 2023	Scottish National Party	Nicola Sturgeon						
Christina McKelvie		29 March 2023	8 February 2024	Scottish National Party	Humza Yousaf						
Kaukab Stewart		12 February 2024	8 May 2024	Scottish National Party	Humza Yousaf						
Minister for Europe, External Affairs & Energy
Stephen Gethins		21 May 2026	Incumbent	Scottish National Party	John Swinney						
