= Directorates of the Scottish Government =

Structure of the Scottish Government civil service

The work of the Scottish Government is carried out by Directorates, each headed by a Director. The Directorates are grouped into a number of Directorates-General families, each headed by a Director-General. However, the individual Directorates are the building blocks of the system. The Directorates are further broken down into 'Divisions' and then by Units (also sometimes referred to as Branches) and finally by Teams. Divisions usually consist of 25-50 people. There is no direct correspondence between the political responsibilities of the Ministers in the Scottish Government and the Directorates, although in some cases there is considerable overlap. The Directorates are also responsible for a number of government agencies and non-departmental public bodies. Some government work is also carried out by Executive Agencies such as Transport Scotland, who sit outside the Directorates structure, but are also staffed by civil servants.

The current system of Directorates was created by a December 2010 re-organisation. Prior to 2007 the Directorates were preceded by similar structures called "Departments" that no longer exist (although the word is still sometimes used in this context).

The Permanent Secretary to the Scottish Government is the most senior civil servant in Scotland. The role is currently occupied by Joe Griffin who was appointed on 7 April 2025.

== Structure of the Directorates ==
The structure of the directorates as of May 2026 is given below.

=== Communities and External Affairs Directorates ===
Director-General: Kenneth Hogg

Directorates:

- Culture and External Affairs
- EU
- Equality, Inclusion and Human Rights
- Local Government and Housing
- Social Security
- Tackling Child Poverty and Social Justice

=== Corporate Directorates ===
Director-General: Miriam Craven

Directorates:

- Communications and Ministerial Support
- Corporate Operations
- COVID Inquries Response
- Digital
- Financial Management
- Legal Services (Solicitor to the Scottish Government)
- People
- Propriety and Ethics
- Scottish Procurement and Property

=== Economy Directorates ===
Director-General: Gregor Irwin

Directorates:

- Business and Better Regulation
- Chief Economist
- Economic Development
- International Trade and Investment
- Jobs and Wellbeing Economy

=== Education and Justice Directorates ===
Director-General: Neil Rennick

Directorates:

- Children and Families
- Early Learning and Childcare
- Education Reform
- Justice
- Learning
- Lifelong Learning and Skills
- Safer Communities

=== Exchequer, Strategy and Performance ===
Director-General: Shona Riach

Directorates:

- Constitution
- Parliamentary Counsel Office
- Performance, Delivery and Resilience
- Public Service Reform
- Strategy

=== Health and Social Care Directorates ===
Director-General and Chief Executive of NHS Scotland: Caroline Lamb

Directorates:

- Chief Medical Officer
- Chief Nursing Officer
- Chief Operating Officer, NHS Scotland
- Digital Health and Care
- Health Workforce
- Health and Social Care Finance
- Mental Health
- People, Appointments and Governance
- Population Health
- Primary Care
- Social Care and National Care Service Development

=== Net Zero Directorates ===
Director-General: Andy Kerr

Directorates:

- Agriculture and Rural Economy
- Energy and Climate Change
- Environment and Forestry
- Marine
- Offshore Wind
