= First Swinney government =

Scottish Government from 2024 to 2026

- 12th Government of Scotland
- 2024–2026
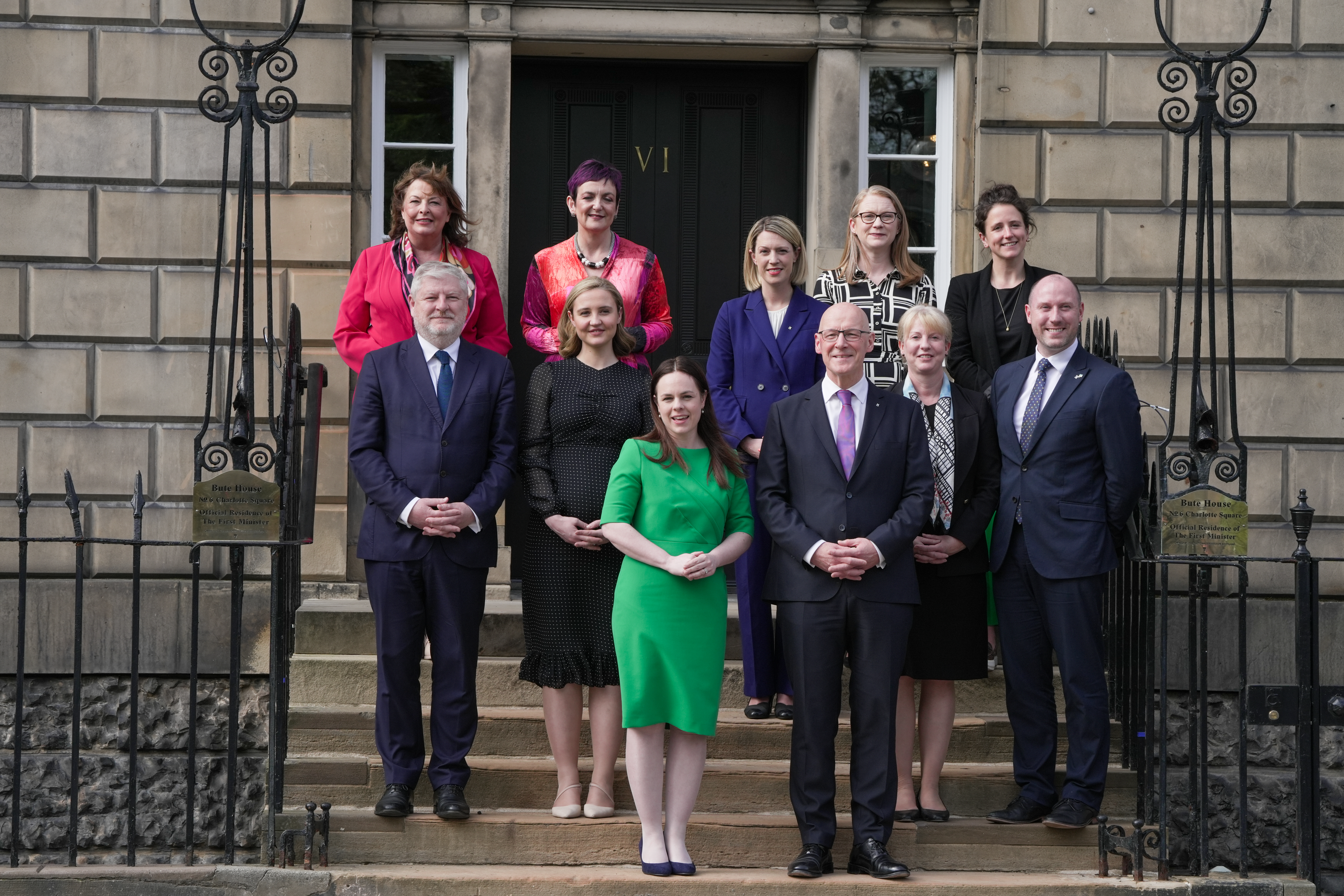
- Swinney's cabinet outside Bute House, 2024
- Date formed: 8 May 2024
- Date dissolved: 20 May 2026

People and organisations
- Monarch: Charles III
- First Minister: John Swinney
- First Minister's history: MSP for Perthshire North (1999–present); Deputy First Minister of Scotland (2014–2023); Cabinet Secretary for Finance and the Economy (2007–2016, 2022–2023); Cabinet Secretary for Covid Recovery (2021–2023); Cabinet Secretary for Education and Skills (2016–2021)
- Deputy First Minister: Kate Forbes
- Member parties: Scottish National Party
- Status in legislature: Minority
- Opposition cabinet: Opposition Parties
- Opposition party: Scottish Conservative
- Opposition leader: Douglas Ross (May 2021–Sept 2024); Russell Findlay (Sept 2024–Apr 2026)

History
- Incoming formation: 2024 Scottish National Party leadership election
- Outgoing election: 2026 Scottish Parliament election
- Legislature term: 6th Scottish Parliament
- Budget: 2025 Scottish budget
- Predecessor: Second Yousaf government
- Successor: Second Swinney government

John Swinney formed the first Swinney government on 8 May 2024, following his appointment as First Minister of Scotland at the Court of Session. The government was approved by parliamentary vote thanks to the abstention of Scottish Green MSPs.

Swinney's government was announced on 8 May following his tenure as first minister beginning, and includes eleven cabinet secretaries, the majority of whom are women, with the youngest deputy first minister, Kate Forbes, being appointed by Swinney. The majority of members of the government were part of the cabinet under Swinney's predecessor, Humza Yousaf's second government.

Newly appointed cabinet secretaries who were not part of the previous government were appointed as cabinet secretary designates, pending approval by members of the Scottish Parliament and receiving approval by the incumbent monarch.

Swinney's first government dissolved on 20 May 2026 following the 2026 election to the 7th Scottish Parliament, which saw Swinney returning to office and forming a second government.

== History ==
On 29 April 2024, Humza Yousaf announced his intention to resign the leadership of the Scottish National Party, and as First Minister. Swinney announced his candidacy for the internal leadership contest, and was elected unopposed. Shona Robison resigned as Deputy First Minister on 8 May in favour of Kate Forbes, but was re-appointed as Swinney's Finance Secretary with additional responsibility for local government.

The majority of Swinney's cabinet served in Humza Yousaf's government. The only addition to the cabinet was Kate Forbes replacing Shona Robison as Deputy First Minister of Scotland, and taking part of Màiri McAllan's responsibility for economy into her portfolio as Cabinet Secretary for Economy and Gaelic.

Only one new junior minister joined Swinney's government, former minister Ivan McKee, with the number of junior ministerial posts being reduced from 16 to 14. The portfolio of Minister for Employment and Investment was created, with Tom Arthur appointed to the role. The ministers for independence and culture were abolished, with their incumbents Jamie Hepburn and Kaukab Stewart moved to other positions. Joe FitzPatrick's local government position was abolished, and he therefore departed government along with Equalities Minister Emma Roddick and Parliamentary Business Minister George Adam.

== Approval and cabinet adjustments ==
The Scottish Parliament formally approved the appointments of Kate Forbes and Ivan McKee on 9 May 2024.

Prior to Swinney's appointment, it was announced in February 2024 that Màiri McAllan would be taking maternity leave. From 1 July 2024, McAllan began her maternity leave. Gillian Martin was appointed as Acting Cabinet Secretary for Net Zero and Energy, and Alasdair Allan was appointed as Acting Minister for Climate Action.

In June 2025, Swinney conducted a minor reshuffle following McAllan's return from maternity leave. Martin was appointed to the position of Cabinet Secretary for Climate Action and Energy and McAllan was given the new post of Cabinet Secretary for Housing. Dr Allan departed government as did Minister for Housing, Paul McLennan. Maree Todd was made Minister for Drugs & Alcohol Policy and Sport, filling the post which had been left vacant following the death of Christina McKelvie in March 2025. Tom Arthur replaced Todd as Minister for Social Care and Mental Wellbeing and his economy brief was absorbed by Richard Lochhead who went from Minister for Business to Minister for Business and Employment.

In September 2025, Jamie Hepburn resigned as Minister for Parliamentary Business following an altercation with Conservative MSP Douglas Ross in the parliamentary chamber. He was replaced by Graeme Dey, who also retained his role as Minister for Veterans. Ben Macpherson rejoined the government as Minister for Higher and Further Education (Dey's former role).

== Cabinet ==
=== May 2024 – June 2025 ===
Portfolio	Portrait	Minister	Term
First Minister		The Rt Hon John Swinney MSP	May 2024 – present
Cabinet secretaries
Deputy First Minister		Kate Forbes MSP	May 2024 – present
Cabinet Secretary for Economy and Gaelic		Kate Forbes MSP	May 2024 – present
Cabinet Secretary for Finance and Local Government		Shona Robison MSP	March 2023 – present (Note: Robison previously held the Finance portfolio since March 2023 but gained the additional portfolio of Local Government in May 2024)
Cabinet Secretary for Health and Social Care		Neil Gray MSP	February 2024 – present (Note: Portfolio was titled Cabinet Secretary for NHS Recovery, Health and Social Care from 8 February 2024 to 8 May 2024)
Cabinet Secretary for Transport		Fiona Hyslop MSP	February 2024 – present
Cabinet Secretary for Net Zero and Energy		Màiri McAllan MSP	February 2024 – June 2025 (Note: McAllan had additional responsibility for the Economy from 8 February 2024 until this was shuffled to Kate Forbes on 8 May 2024) (Note: McAllan was on maternity leave between July 2024 and June 2025 with Gillian Martin filling the role in an acting capacity)
Cabinet Secretary for Education and Skills		Jenny Gilruth MSP	March 2023 – present
Cabinet Secretary for Rural Affairs, Land Reform and Islands		Mairi Gougeon MSP	May 2021 – present
Cabinet Secretary for the Constitution, External Affairs and Culture		The Rt Hon Angus Robertson MSP	May 2021 – present
Cabinet Secretary for Social Justice		Shirley-Anne Somerville MSP	March 2023 – present
Cabinet Secretary for Justice and Home Affairs		Angela Constance MSP	March 2023 – present
Also attending cabinet meetings
Permanent Secretary		John-Paul Marks	2022–April 2025
Permanent Secretary		Joe Griffin	April 2025-present
Minister for Parliamentary Business		Jamie Hepburn MSP	May 2024–present
Lord Advocate		The Rt Hon. Dorothy Bain KC	2021–present

=== June 2025 – May 2026 ===
Portfolio	Portrait	Minister	Term
First Minister		The Rt Hon John Swinney MSP	May 2024 – present
Cabinet secretaries
Deputy First Minister		Kate Forbes MSP	May 2024 – present
Cabinet Secretary for Economy and Gaelic		Kate Forbes MSP	May 2024 – present
Cabinet Secretary for Finance and Local Government		Shona Robison MSP	March 2023 – present (Note: Robison previously held the Finance portfolio since March 2023 but gained the additional portfolio of Local Government in May 2024)
Cabinet Secretary for Health and Social Care		Neil Gray MSP	February 2024 – present (Note: Portfolio was titled Cabinet Secretary for NHS Recovery, Health and Social Care from 8 February 2024 to 8 May 2024)
Cabinet Secretary for Transport		Fiona Hyslop MSP	February 2024 – present
Cabinet Secretary for Climate Action and Energy		Gillian Martin MSP	June 2025 – present
Cabinet Secretary for Housing		Màiri McAllan MSP	June 2025 – present
Cabinet Secretary for Education and Skills		Jenny Gilruth MSP	March 2023 – present
Cabinet Secretary for Rural Affairs, Land Reform and Islands		Mairi Gougeon MSP	May 2021 – present
Cabinet Secretary for the Constitution, External Affairs and Culture		The Rt Hon Angus Robertson MSP	May 2021 – present
Cabinet Secretary for Social Justice		Shirley-Anne Somerville MSP	March 2023 – present
Cabinet Secretary for Justice and Home Affairs		Angela Constance MSP	March 2023 – present
Also attending cabinet meetings
Permanent Secretary		Joe Griffin	April 2025 – present
Minister for Parliamentary Business		Jamie Hepburn MSP	May 2024 – September 2025
Minister for Parliamentary Business		Graeme Dey MSP	September 2025 – present
Lord Advocate		The Rt Hon. Dorothy Bain KC	2021 – present

== List of junior ministers ==
=== May 2024 – June 2025 ===
Junior ministers
Post	Minister	Term
Minister for Parliamentary Business	Jamie Hepburn MSP	2024–present
Minister for Employment and Investment	Tom Arthur MSP	2024–2025
Minister for Public Finance	Ivan McKee MSP	2024–present
Minister for Public Health and Women's Health	Jenni Minto MSP	2023–present
Minister for Social Care, Mental Wellbeing and Sport	Maree Todd MSP	2023–2025
Minister for Children, Young People and the Promise	Natalie Don MSP	2023–present
Minister for Higher and Further Education Minister for Veterans	Graeme Dey MSP	2023–present
Minister for Business	Richard Lochhead MSP	2023–present
Minister for Climate Action (Note: Also served as Acting Cabinet Secretary for New Zero and Energy whilst incumbent Màiri McAllan was on maternity leave making Alasdair Allan Acting Minister for Climate Action)	Gillian Martin MSP	2023–2025
Minister for Drugs and Alcohol Policy	Christina McKelvie MSP	2024-March 2025
Minister for Equalities	Kaukab Stewart MSP	2024–present
Minister for Housing	Paul McLennan MSP	2023–2025
Minister for Victims and Community Safety	Siobhian Brown MSP	2023–present
Minister for Agriculture and Connectivity	Jim Fairlie MSP	2024-present

=== June – September 2025 ===
Junior ministers
Post	Minister	Term
Minister for Parliamentary Business	Jamie Hepburn MSP	2024–present
Minister for Public Finance	Ivan McKee MSP	2024–present
Minister for Public Health and Women's Health	Jenni Minto MSP	2023–present
Minister for Social Care and Mental Wellbeing	Tom Arthur MSP	2025–present
Minister for Children, Young People and the Promise	Natalie Don-Innes MSP	2023–present
Minister for Higher and Further Education Minister for Veterans	Graeme Dey MSP	2023–present
Minister for Business and Employment	Richard Lochhead MSP	2023–present
Minister for Drugs & Alcohol Policy and Sport	Maree Todd MSP	2025-present
Minister for Equalities	Kaukab Stewart MSP	2024–present
Minister for Victims and Community Safety	Siobhian Brown MSP	2023–present
Minister for Agriculture and Connectivity	Jim Fairlie MSP	2024–present

=== September 2025 – May 2026 ===
Junior ministers
Post	Minister	Term
Minister for Parliamentary Business; Minister for Veterans	Graeme Dey MSP	2025–present
Minister for Public Finance	Ivan McKee MSP	2024–present
Minister for Public Health and Women's Health	Jenni Minto MSP	2023–present
Minister for Social Care and Mental Wellbeing	Tom Arthur MSP	2025–present
Minister for Children, Young People and the Promise	Natalie Don-Innes MSP	2023–present
Minister for Higher and Further Education	Ben Macpherson MSP	2025–present
Minister for Business and Employment	Richard Lochhead MSP	2023–present
Minister for Drugs & Alcohol Policy and Sport	Maree Todd MSP	2025-present
Minister for Equalities	Kaukab Stewart MSP	2024–present
Minister for Victims and Community Safety	Siobhian Brown MSP	2023–present
Minister for Agriculture and Connectivity	Jim Fairlie MSP	2024-present

== Scottish law officers ==
Law officers
Post	Name	Portrait	Term
Lord Advocate	The Rt Hon. Dorothy Bain KC		2021–present
Solicitor General for Scotland	Ruth Charteris KC		2021–present
