= First Sturgeon government =

Scottish Government led by Nicola Sturgeon from November 2014

- 7th government of Scotland
- 2014–2016
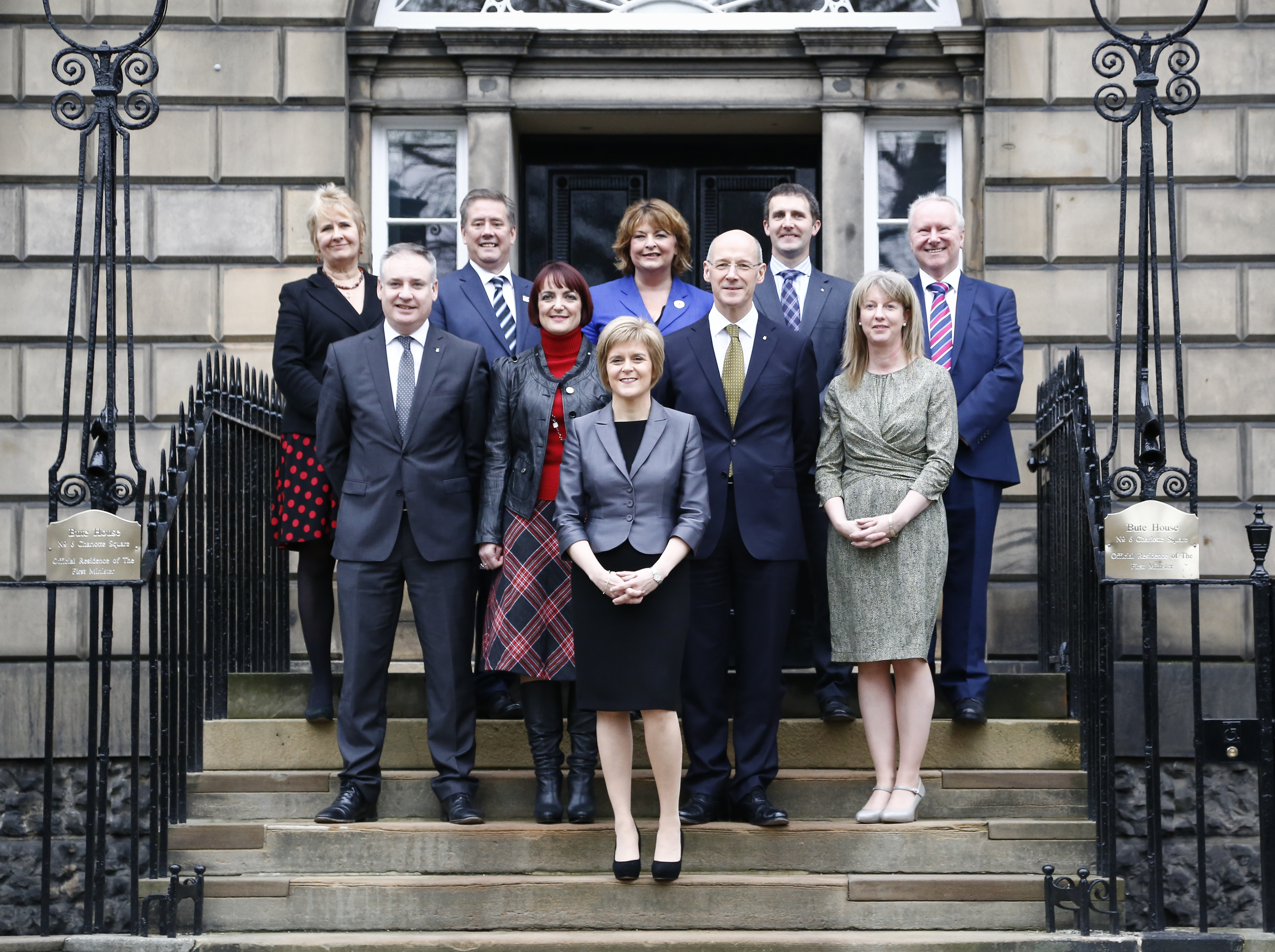
- Date formed: 20 November 2014
- Date dissolved: 18 May 2016

People and organisations
- Monarch: Elizabeth II
- First Minister: Nicola Sturgeon
- First Minister's history: MSP for Glasgow Southside (2007–present); Deputy First Minister of Scotland (2007–2014); Cabinet Secretary for Infrastructure, Investment and Cities (2012–2014); Cabinet Secretary for Health and Wellbeing (2007–2012)
- Deputy First Minister: John Swinney
- Total no. of members: 25
- Member party: Scottish National Party
- Status in legislature: Majority
- Opposition party: Scottish Labour Party
- Opposition leader: Jackie Baillie (2014); Kezia Dugdale (2014-15); Iain Gray (2015); Kezia Dugdale (2015-16)

History
- Incoming formation: 2014 Scottish National Party leadership election
- Outgoing election: 2016 Scottish Parliament election
- Legislature term: 4th Scottish Parliament
- Budget: 2015 Scottish budget 2016 Scottish budget
- Predecessor: Second Salmond government
- Successor: Second Sturgeon government

Nicola Sturgeon formed the first Sturgeon government on 20 November 2014, following the resignation of previous SNP First Minister, Alex Salmond. Sturgeon, who had been Deputy First Minister under Salmond, was elected to succeed him by the SNP majority in the Scottish Parliament on 19 November 2014, before being officially sworn in in front of senior judges at the Court of Session the next day.

Sturgeon's cabinet dissolved on 18 May 2016 following the 2016 election to the 5th Scottish parliament, which saw Sturgeon returning to office and forming a second government.

== History ==
Following the defeat of the campaign for Scottish independence in a 2014 referendum, then First Minister Alex Salmond, who had arranged the referendum, announced that he would resign as Scottish National Party leader and first minister after a new leader was chosen. Deputy First Minister Nicola Sturgeon took the leadership unopposed at the SNP's annual conference on 14 November 2014. This also effectively made her First Minister-designate, given the SNP's outright majority in the Scottish Parliament. She was elected to succeed Salmond as First Minister by the Scottish Parliament on 19 November, and formally appointed by Queen Elizabeth II on the next day.

On 21 November 2014 Sturgeon's first cabinet was announced. It was formed of ten people: Sturgeon and nine cabinet secretaries. It was gender-balanced with five men and five women. There were thirteen junior ministerial positions outwith the cabinet.

== Cabinet ==
=== November 2014 to May 2016 ===
I Cabinet of Nicola Sturgeon
Portfolio	Portrait	Minister	Term	Ref.
Cabinet secretaries
First Minister		The Rt Hon Nicola Sturgeon MSP	2014–2023	
Deputy First Minister		John Swinney MSP	2014–2023	
Cabinet Secretary for Finance, Constitution & Economy		John Swinney MSP	2007 (Note: Previously served as the Finance Secretary in the Alex Salmond governments.)–2016	
Cabinet Secretary for Infrastructure, Investment and Cities		Keith Brown MSP	2014–2016	
Cabinet Secretary for Fair Work, Skills & Training		Roseanna Cunningham MSP	2014–2016	
Cabinet Secretary for Education & Lifelong Learning		Angela Constance MSP	2014–2016	
Cabinet Secretary for Health, Wellbeing & Sport		Shona Robison MSP	2014–2016	
Cabinet Secretary for Social Justice, Communities and Pensioners' Rights		Alex Neil MSP	2014–2016	
Cabinet Secretary for Justice		Michael Matheson MSP	2014–2016	
Cabinet Secretary for Rural Affairs, Food and Environment		Richard Lochhead MSP	2014–2016	
Cabinet Secretary for Culture, Europe and External Affairs		Fiona Hyslop MSP	2014–2016	
Also attending cabinet meetings (Note: The following members also attend the Scottish Cabinet, however, some are not required to attend every meeting.)
Permanent Secretary		Leslie Evans	2015–2022	
Minister for Parliamentary Business		Joe FitzPatrick MSP	2014–2016	
Lord Advocate		The Rt Hon. Frank Mulholland QC	2011–2016	

==== Changes ====
- Sir Peter Housden stood down as the Permanent Secretary to the Scottish government in June 2015 and was succeeded by Leslie Evans the following month.

== Junior Ministers ==
Junior ministers
Post	Minister	Term
Minister for Business, Energy and Tourism	Fergus Ewing MSP	2014–2016
Minister for Parliamentary Business	Joe Fitzpatrick MSP	2014–2016
Minister for Transport and Islands	Derek Mackay MSP	2014–2016
Minister for Youth and Women's Employment	Annabelle Ewing MSP	2014–2016
Minister for Children and Young People	Aileen Campbell MSP	2014–2016
Minister for Learning, Science and Scotland's Languages	Dr Alasdair Allan MSP	2014–2016
Minister for Public Health	Maureen Watt MSP	2014–2016
Minister for Sport, Health Improvement and Mental Health	Jamie Hepburn MSP	2014–2016
Minister for Local Government and Community Empowerment	Marco Biagi MSP	2014–2016
Minister for Housing and Welfare	Margaret Burgess MSP	2014–2016
Minister for Community Safety and Legal Affairs	Paul Wheelhouse MSP	2014–2016
Minister for Environment, Climate Change and Land Reform	Dr Aileen McLeod MSP	2014–2016
Minister for Europe and International Development	Humza Yousaf MSP	2014–2016

== Scottish Law Officers ==
Law officers
Post	Name	Portrait	Term
Lord Advocate	The Right Hon. Frank Mulholland QC		2011–2016
Solicitor General for Scotland	Lesley Thomson QC		2011–2016

== See also ==
- Premiership of Nicola Sturgeon
