= Third Sturgeon government =

Scottish Government from 2021 to 2023

- 9th Government of Scotland
- 2021–2023
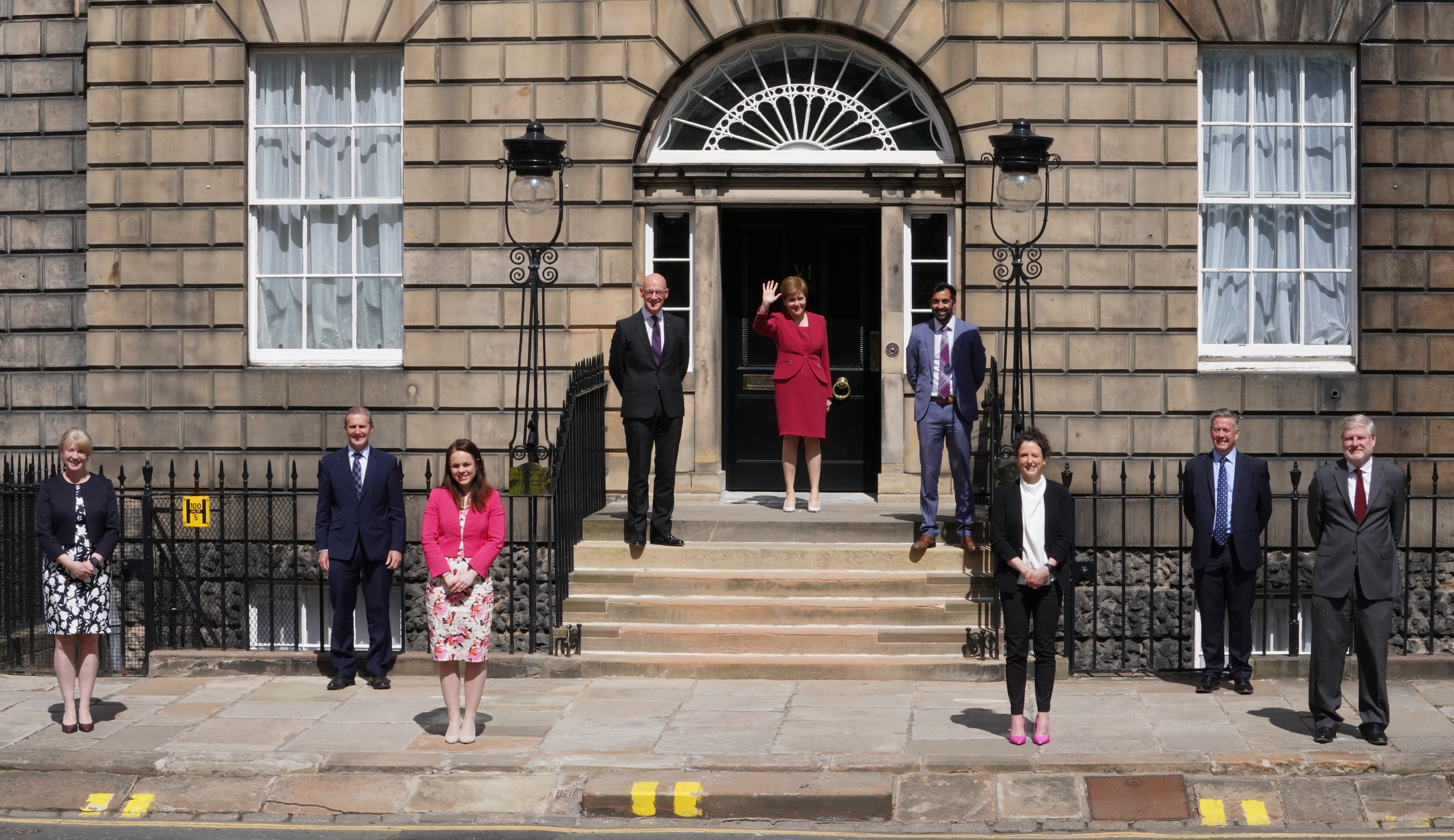
- Sturgeon's cabinet socially distanced outside Bute House, 2021
- Date formed: 19 May 2021
- Date dissolved: 28 March 2023

People and organisations
- Monarch: Elizabeth II; Charles III
- First Minister: Nicola Sturgeon
- First Minister's history: MSP for Glasgow Southside (2007–present); Deputy First Minister of Scotland (2007–2014); Cabinet Secretary for Infrastructure, Investment and Cities (2012–2014); Cabinet Secretary for Health and Wellbeing (2007–2012)
- Deputy First Minister: John Swinney
- No. of ministers: 27
- Total no. of members: 27
- Member parties: Scottish National Party; Scottish Greens (August 2021–March 2023)
- Status in legislature: Majority (coalition) cooperation and confidence and supply agreement between the SNP and the Greens; Minority (May–August 2021)
- Opposition cabinet: Opposition Parties
- Opposition party: Scottish Conservative
- Opposition leader: Douglas Ross

History
- Outgoing formation: 2023 Scottish National Party leadership election
- Election: 2021 Scottish Parliament election
- Legislature term: 6th Scottish Parliament
- Budgets: 2022 Scottish budget 2023 Scottish budget
- Predecessor: Second Sturgeon government
- Successor: First Yousaf government

Nicola Sturgeon formed the third Sturgeon government following her Scottish National Party's victory in the 2021 Scottish Parliament election. Sturgeon was nominated by a vote of the 6th Scottish Parliament for appointment to the post of First Minister on 18 May 2021 and announced the formation of a new Scottish National Party minority government on 19 May.

Sturgeon is the first First Minister to form a third government. Her cabinet, like her previous two, was 50/50 gender neutral. On 31 August 2021, the SNP and Scottish Greens entered the Bute House Agreement, a power-sharing arrangement which resulted in the appointment of two Green MSPs as junior ministers in the government, delivery of a shared policy platform, and Green support for the government on votes of confidence and supply.

Following Sturgeon’s decision to resign as Scottish First Minister and Leader of the SNP in February 2023, her government continued in a caretaker capacity until her successor, Humza Yousaf, was elected by the party at the end of the following month.

== History ==
In the May 2021 Scottish Parliament election, the Scottish National Party (SNP) won 64 of the 129 seats contested, and the incumbent first minister Nicola Sturgeon soon afterwards announced her intention to form a minority government. She was nominated for the post of first minister by a vote of the Scottish Parliament on 18 May, defeating Scottish Conservative leader Douglas Ross and Scottish Liberal Democrat leader Willie Rennie by 64 votes to 31 and 4 respectively.

Long standing ministers Jeane Freeman, Michael Russell, Roseanna Cunningham and Aileen Campbell did not seek re-election to the 6th Scottish Parliament, with Fiona Hyslop and Fergus Ewing standing down from government. This left Sturgeon with many empty posts.

Shortly after being elected, Sturgeon re-appointed John Swinney as deputy first minister and also appointed him to the newly created Cabinet Secretary for Covid Recovery post. Humza Yousaf, Kate Forbes, Shirley-Anne Somerville and Michael Matheson all remained in government. Shona Robison and Keith Brown made a return to cabinet, having served in Sturgeon's previous governments. Only Mairi Gougeon and Angus Robertson were new to cabinet. The Scottish Parliament confirmed the appointment of ministers and junior ministers on 20 May.

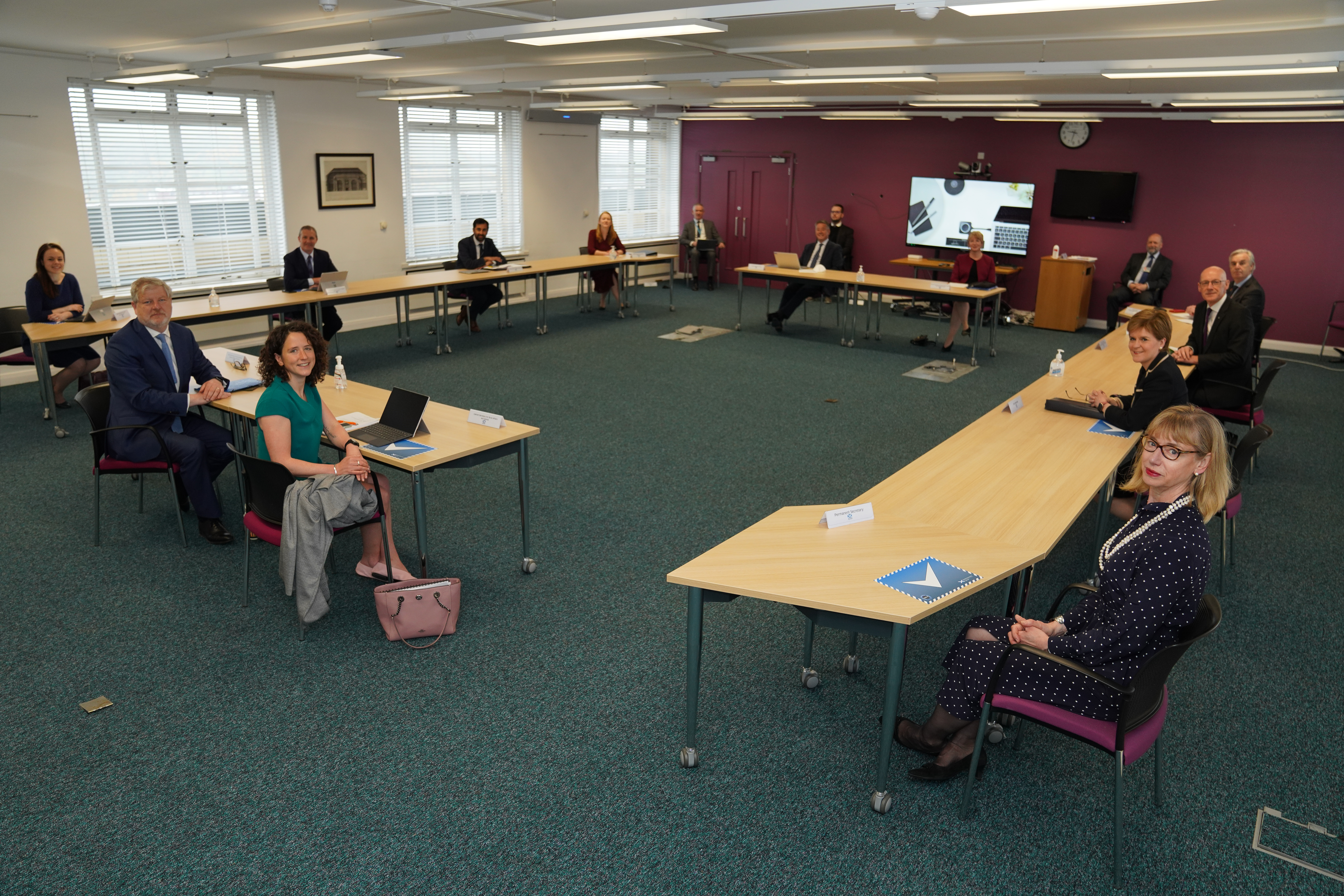
The first meeting of the third Sturgeon government at St Andrews House, 2021

In May 2021, both the Lord Advocate, James Wolffe, and Solicitor General for Scotland, Alison Di Rollo, announced their intention to step down as Scotland's top law officers. On 17 June, Sturgeon nominated Dorothy Bain to serve as Lord Advocate and Ruth Charteris to serve as Solicitor General. This is the first time in history both posts have been held by women.

On 20 August 2021, following two months of negotiations, the SNP and Scottish Greens announced a power-sharing agreement, the Bute House Agreement. While not an official coalition, it would be the first time in both Scottish and UK history that Green politicians would be in government. The Greens held two ministerial posts. The agreement will see both parties pledge for a second referendum on Scottish independence, an increase investment in active travel and public transport, enhancing tenants rights, a ten-year £500m Just Transition and establishing a National Care Service.

On 21 February 2023, Sturgeon chaired her final meeting of her third cabinet following her resignation the previous month. It was also Swinney's final attendance to a Scottish Cabinet, having announced his retirement from government after serving under First Minister Alex Salmond and Sturgeon from 2007 until 2023. Swinney later became First Minister in May 2024 following the 2024 Scottish government crisis that led to Yousaf's resignation.

== Cabinet ==
=== May 2021 – March 2023 ===
III Cabinet of Nicola Sturgeon
Portfolio	Portrait	Minister	Term
Cabinet secretaries
First Minister		The Rt Hon Nicola Sturgeon MSP	2014–2023
Deputy First Minister		John Swinney MSP	2014–2023
Cabinet Secretary for Covid Recovery		John Swinney MSP	2021–2023
Cabinet Secretary for Finance and the Economy		Kate Forbes MSP	2020–2023
Cabinet Secretary for Health and Social Care		Humza Yousaf MSP	2021–2023
Cabinet Secretary for Education and Skills		Shirley-Anne Somerville MSP	2021–2023
Cabinet Secretary for Net Zero, Energy and Transport		Michael Matheson MSP	2018–2023
Cabinet Secretary for Justice and Veterans		Keith Brown MSP	2021–2023
Cabinet Secretary for Social Justice, Housing and Local Government		Shona Robison MSP	2021–2023
Cabinet Secretary for Rural Affairs and Islands		Mairi Gougeon MSP	2021–2023
Cabinet Secretary for the Constitution, External Affairs and Culture		The Rt Hon. Angus Robertson MSP	2021–2023
Also attending cabinet meetings (Note: The following members also attend the Scottish Cabinet, however, some are not required to attend every meeting.) (Note: The Co-leaders of the Scottish Greens also attend cabinet twice a year as part of the Bute House Agreement)
Permanent Secretary		John-Paul Marks	2022–2023
Minister for Parliamentary Business		George Adam MSP	2021–2023
Lord Advocate		The Rt Hon. Dorothy Bain KC	2021–2023

==== Changes ====
- Leslie Evans stood down as the Permanent Secretary to the Scottish Government in January 2022 and was replaced by John-Paul Marks.

== List of junior ministers ==
=== Junior ministers ===
Post	Minister	Political Party	Term
Minister for Drugs Policy	Angela Constance MSP	SNP	2020–2023
Minister for Parliamentary Business	George Adam MSP	SNP	2021–2023
Minister for Just Transition, Employment and Fair Work	Richard Lochhead MSP	SNP	2021–2023
Minister for Business, Trade, Tourism and Enterprise	Ivan McKee MSP	SNP	2021–2023
Minister for Public Finance, Planning and Community Wealth	Tom Arthur MSP	SNP	2021–2023
Minister for Public Health, Women's Health and Sport	Maree Todd MSP	SNP	2021–2023
Minister for Mental Wellbeing and Social Care	Kevin Stewart MSP	SNP	2021–2023
Minister for Children and Young People	Clare Haughey MSP	SNP	2021–2023
Minister for Higher Education and Further Education, Youth Employment and Training	Jamie Hepburn MSP	SNP	2021–2023
Minister for Environment, Biodiversity and Land Reform	Mairi McAllan MSP	SNP	2021–2023
Minister for Transport	Graeme Dey MSP	SNP	2021–2022
Minister for Transport	Jenny Gilruth MSP	SNP	2022-2023
Minister for Community Safety	Ash Regan MSP	SNP	2021–October 2022
Minister for Community Safety	Elena Whitham MSP	SNP	November 2022-2023
Minister for Equalities and Older People	Christina McKelvie MSP	SNP	2018–2023
Minister for Social Security and Local Government	Ben MacPherson MSP	SNP	2021–2023
Minister for Culture, Europe and International Development Minister with special responsibility for Refugees from Ukraine	Neil Gray MSP	SNP	2022–2023
Minister for Zero Carbon Buildings, Active Travel and Tenants’ Rights	Patrick Harvie MSP	Scottish Green	2021–2023
Minister for Green Skills, Circular Economy and Biodiversity	Lorna Slater MSP	Scottish Green	2021–2023

==== Changes ====
- Graeme Dey resigned as Minister for Transport and was replaced by Jenny Gilruth, the Minister for Culture, Europe and International Development. Gilruth was succeeded by Neil Gray who was appointed Minister for Culture, Europe and International Development and Minister with special responsibility for Refugees from Ukraine.
- Ash Regan resigned as Minister for Community Safety in October 2022. Elena Whitham was appointed as the new Minister for Community Safety in November 2022.

== Scottish Law Officers ==
Law officers
Post	Name	Portrait	Term
Lord Advocate	The Rt Hon. Dorothy Bain KC		2021–2023
Solicitor General for Scotland	Ruth Charteris KC		2021–2023
