= Prostitution (Offences and Support) (Scotland) Bill =

Proposed Scottish law

- Bill
- Scottish Parliament
- Long title: An Act of the Scottish Parliament to make it an offence to obtain the performance of sexual acts by a person; to repeal offences of solicitation and provide for the quashing of certain convictions for offences of solicitation; to provide for support for persons in prostitution; and for connected purposes.
- Introduced by: Ash Regan
Other legislation
Amends	Civic Government (Scotland) Act 1982

Status: Not passed

History of passage through the Parliament

The Prostitution (Offences and Support) (Scotland) Bill, also known as the Unbuyable Bill, was a proposed Act of the Scottish Parliament which aimed to implement the Nordic model approach to prostitution by criminalising the purchase of sex while repealing convictions for solicitation under the Civic Government (Scotland) Act 1982. It also aimed to provide statutory assistance for people moving away from sex work.

== History ==
=== Background ===
As of the bill's publication, prostitution itself is legal in Scotland but associated activities such as public solicitation, kerb crawling and operating a brothel are criminal offences.

In 2002, Margo MacDonald published the Prostitution Tolerance Zones (Scotland) Bill, which aimed to allow sex work in selected local areas. After being formally introduced in parliament in 2003, the bill was withdrawn in 2005. In September 2015, Jean Urquhart proposed the Prostitution Law Reform (Scotland) Bill, which aimed to decriminalise sex work. It was not passed before the 2016 Scottish Parliament election.

The Scottish National Party's manifesto for the 2021 Scottish Parliament election contained a pledge to "challenge men's demand for prostitution". The party won a relative majority of seats in the election and formed the following government. Ash Regan, then the Minister for Community Safety, subsequently reiterated the manifesto pledge.

In 2023, Regan established Unbuyable, a campaign to implement the Nordic model, describing it as a "a clarion call to end the systemic exploitation of women and girls in Scotland". In March 2024, she blamed the Scottish Greens for delaying the intended measures, claiming that they vetoed any action on the sex trade during their time in the Scottish Government under the Bute House Agreement.

=== The bill ===
The Prostitution (Offences and Support) (Scotland) Bill was proposed on 18 June 2024 by Regan, who had since crossed the floor to the Alba Party. She described prostitution as "a system of commercial sexual exploitation that targets the vulnerable" The bill was formally introduced on 20 May 2025.

Regan was criticised for misinterpreting concerns about the bill figuratively "driv[ing] prostitution underground" in an interview with The Herald on 1 June 2025, questioning how sex buyers could operate if the providers were "in underground cellars with a locked door".

In June 2025, the community safety minister Siobhian Brown expressed doubts about parts of the bill, including the quashing of solicitation convictions and the logistics surrounding the measures to help people leaving sex work. She reiterated her support for the Nordic model.

In September 2025, The Herald reported that a domain name formerly owned by Regan was pointing to a website critical of the bill.

Regan resigned from the Alba Party in October 2025 to prioritise her work on the bill.

In November 2025, Brown reiterated doubts about parts of the bill, adding that "substantial amendments" would be required for it to become law, citing "significant operational and policy challenges" with the bill, further stating that there was ministerial support for the Nordic model. Regan invited the government to cooperate with her on the bill and offered to remove the measures to repeal convictions, pointing to the use of pardons as an alternative.

On 2 February 2026, the Scottish Government stated that it would not ultimately endorse the bill, pointing to uncertainty on how it would be implemented and the potential for increased violence against sex workers, while expressing support for the Nordic model. Regan called the decision a "profound failure of political courage".

=== Stage 1 vote ===
The Scottish Parliament voted against the bill on 3 February 2026 by a majority of 64 to 54, with 11 not voting.

Six SNP MSPs rebelled to vote in favour of the bill, including Annabelle Ewing and Elena Whitham who, like Regan, had both previously served as Minister for Community Safety.

Prostitution (Offences and Support) (Scotland) Bill – Stage 1
Party	Votes for	Votes against	Abstained	Did Not Vote
Conservative	25: Alexander Stewart; Brian Whittle; Craig Hoy; Douglas Lumsden; Douglas Ross; Finlay Carson; Jackson Carlaw; Jamie Halcro Johnston; Liam Kerr; Liz Smith; Maurice Golden; Meghan Gallacher; Miles Briggs; Murdo Fraser; Oliver Mundell; Pam Gosal; Rachael Hamilton; Roz McCall; Russell Findlay; Sandesh Gulhane; Sharon Dowey; Stephen Kerr; Sue Webber; Tess White; Tim Eagle	1: Edward Mountain	–	2: Alexander Burnett; Annie Wells
Labour	17: Alex Rowley; Anas Sarwar; Carol Mochan; Claire Baker; Davy Russell; Daniel Johnson; Katy Clark; Mark Griffin; Martin Whitfield; Michael Marra; Monica Lennon; Neil Bibby; Paul O'Kane; Pauline McNeill; Rhoda Grant; Richard Leonard; Sarah Boyack	–	–	4: Jackie Baillie; Mercedes Villalba; Pam Duncan-Glancy; Paul Sweeney
Liberal Democrats	–	3: Alex Cole-Hamilton; Liam McArthur; Willie Rennie	–	2: Beatrice Wishart; Jamie Greene
SNP	6: Annabelle Ewing; Elena Whitham; Kenneth Gibson; Michelle Thomson; Ruth Maguire; Stephanie Callaghan	53: Alasdair Allan; Angela Constance; Angus Robertson; Audrey Nicoll; Ben Macpherson; Bill Kidd; Bob Doris; Christine Grahame; Clare Adamson; Clare Haughey; Colin Beattie; Collette Stevenson; David Torrance; Emma Harper; Emma Roddick; Evelyn Tweed; Fiona Hyslop; Fulton MacGregor; George Adam; Gillian Martin; Gordon MacDonald; Graeme Dey; Humza Yousaf; Ivan McKee; Jackie Dunbar; James Dornan; Jamie Hepburn; Jenni Minto; Jenny Gilruth; Jim Fairlie; Joe FitzPatrick; John Swinney; Karen Adam; Kaukab Stewart; Keith Brown; Kevin Stewart; Mairi Gougeon; Màiri McAllan; Maree Todd; Marie McNair; Michael Matheson; Natalie Don-Innes; Neil Gray; Nicola Sturgeon; Paul McLennan; Richard Lochhead; Rona Mackay; Shirley-Anne Somerville; Shona Robison; Siobhian Brown; Stuart McMillan; Tom Arthur; Willie Coffey	–	1: Kate Forbes
Green	–	7: Ariane Burgess; Gillian Mackay; Lorna Slater; Maggie Chapman; Mark Ruskell; Patrick Harvie; Ross Greer	–	–
Reform	1: Graham Simpson	–	–	–
Independent	5: Ash Regan; Fergus Ewing; Foysol Choudhury; Jeremy Balfour; John Mason	–	–	1: Colin Smyth
No Party Affiliation (Presiding Officer)	–	–	–	1: Alison Johnstone
Total	54	64	0	11

== Opinion ==
=== Support ===
The bill was supported by A Model for Scotland, a campaign group formed in September 2021 to advocate for implementing the Nordic model in Scotland, with the founders of the organisation describing prostitution as a "misogynistic and oppressive system" and consent as impossible to buy.

Police Scotland endorsed the bill, calling the purchase of sex "a form of exploitation", along with the Scottish Trades Union Congress and the gender-critical feminist campaign group For Women Scotland. It was also supported by the Catholic Church in Scotland, which called it a "vital step toward protecting some of the most vulnerable individuals in our society", and by other Christian organisations including the Evangelical Alliance and Christian Action, Research and Education.

Susan Dalgety, a former deputy leader of Edinburgh City Council expressed support for the bill and remorse for the council's licensing of brothels, which were termed "saunas". Kenny MacAskill, the leader of the Alba Party, also endorsed the bill, calling prostitution an "issue of great concern".

=== Opposition ===
Scotland for Decrim is a campaign group formed in 2025 and run by a collective of sex workers to advocate for the bill's withdrawal, citing increased "violence from clients and the police" where the Nordic model has been implemented. In November of that year, they staged a demonstration at the Scottish Parliament against the bill.

A campaign by Scottish sex workers against Regan's bill said it would "put them in more danger, pushing the industry underground, increasing stigma, and exposing people to more violence and poverty".

Polling of 1,088 Scottish adults by YouGov, carried out in 2024, indicated public opposition to the Nordic model, with 47% saying it should be legal for a person to pay someone to have sex with them, compared to 32% who think it should not be legal.

The bill was criticised by sex workers' organisations including National Ugly Mugs and the English Collective of Prostitutes along with human rights groups such as Amnesty International and Human Rights Watch. It was opposed by the Scottish Greens and the Liberal Democrats.

Various trade unions also opposed the bill such as the Public and Commercial Services Union, which stated that the Nordic model leads to "working conditions that are more dangerous or precarious" for providers. Other unions critical of the bill included Equity; ASLEF; the Bakers, Food and Allied Workers Union; the Royal College of Nursing; the University and College Union; the Communication Workers Union; and GMB.

The Crown Office and Procurator Fiscal Service, while supportive of the Nordic model, expressed doubts about the bill's feasibility, pointing to stable demand for sex work in Ireland despite both Northern Ireland and the Republic of Ireland implementing similar laws.

The Scottish Left Review stated its opposition to the Nordic model.
