= Sturgeon government =

Sturgeon government can refer to

- First Sturgeon government, the Scottish Government led by Nicola Sturgeon from 2014 to 2016
- Second Sturgeon government, the Scottish Government led by Nicola Sturgeon from 2016 to 2021
- Third Sturgeon government, the Scottish Government led by Nicola Sturgeon from 2021 to 2023
