= Second Sturgeon government =

Scottish Government following the May 2016 Scottish Parliament general election

- 8th government of Scotland
- 2016–2021
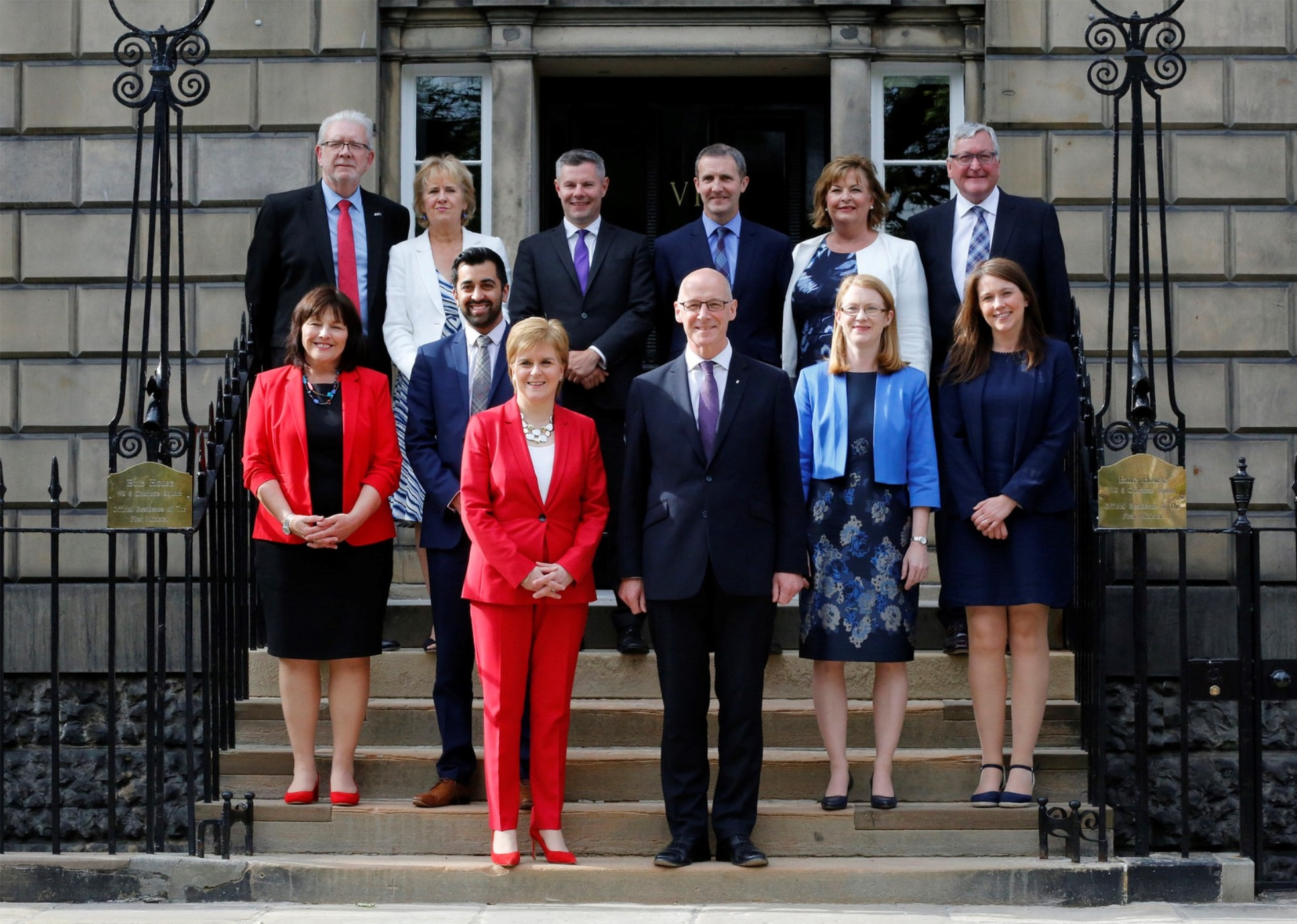
- First Minister Sturgeon's cabinet outside Bute House, 2018
- Date established: 18 May 2016
- Date dissolved: 19 May 2021

Leadership and composition
- Monarch: Elizabeth II
- First Minister: Nicola Sturgeon
- Deputy: John Swinney
- First Minister's history: MSP for Glasgow Southside (2007–present); Deputy First Minister of Scotland (2007–2014); Cabinet Secretary for Infrastructure, Investment and Cities (2012–2014); Cabinet Secretary for Health and Wellbeing (2007–2012)
- Total no. of members: 26 (including First Minister)
- Member party: Scottish National Party
- Status in legislature: Minority
- Opposition party: Scottish Conservative
- Opposition leader: Ruth Davidson (2016-18); Jackson Carlaw (2018-19); Ruth Davidson (2019); Jackson Carlaw (2019-20); Ruth Davidson (2020-21)
- Budgets: 2017 Scottish budget 2018 Scottish budget 2019 Scottish budget 2020 Scottish budget

Formation and history
- Election: 2016 Scottish Parliament election
- Outgoing election: 2021 Scottish Parliament election
- Legislature term: 5th Scottish Parliament
- Predecessor: First Sturgeon government
- Successor: Third Sturgeon government

Nicola Sturgeon formed the second Sturgeon government following her Scottish National Party's victory in the 2016 Scottish Parliament election. Sturgeon was nominated by a vote of the 5th Scottish Parliament for appointment to the post of first minister on 17 May 2016. She was subsequently appointed by Queen Elizabeth II on 18 May, and announced formation of a new Scottish National Party minority government.

The second Sturgeon government was an SNP minority government and despite the whipping and resignation of some MSPs, this was also returned by Labour and Conservative opposition MSPs. Like the previous, it consisted of 50/50 gender balance cabinet; 5 men and 5 women. As part of wide criticism of policies, the resignation of many members and in response to the Brexit negotiations, Sturgeon conducted a major cabinet reshuffle in 2018. Following the resignation of Derek Mackay as Finance Secretary in 2020, Sturgeon performed a minor reshuffle of her cabinet.

The government dissolved on 19 May 2021, following the 2021 election to the 6th Scottish Parliament, which returned the SNP on seat short of a majority and Sturgeon later forming a third government with a deal with the Scottish Greens, creating a pro-independence majority.

== History ==
=== Formation of government ===
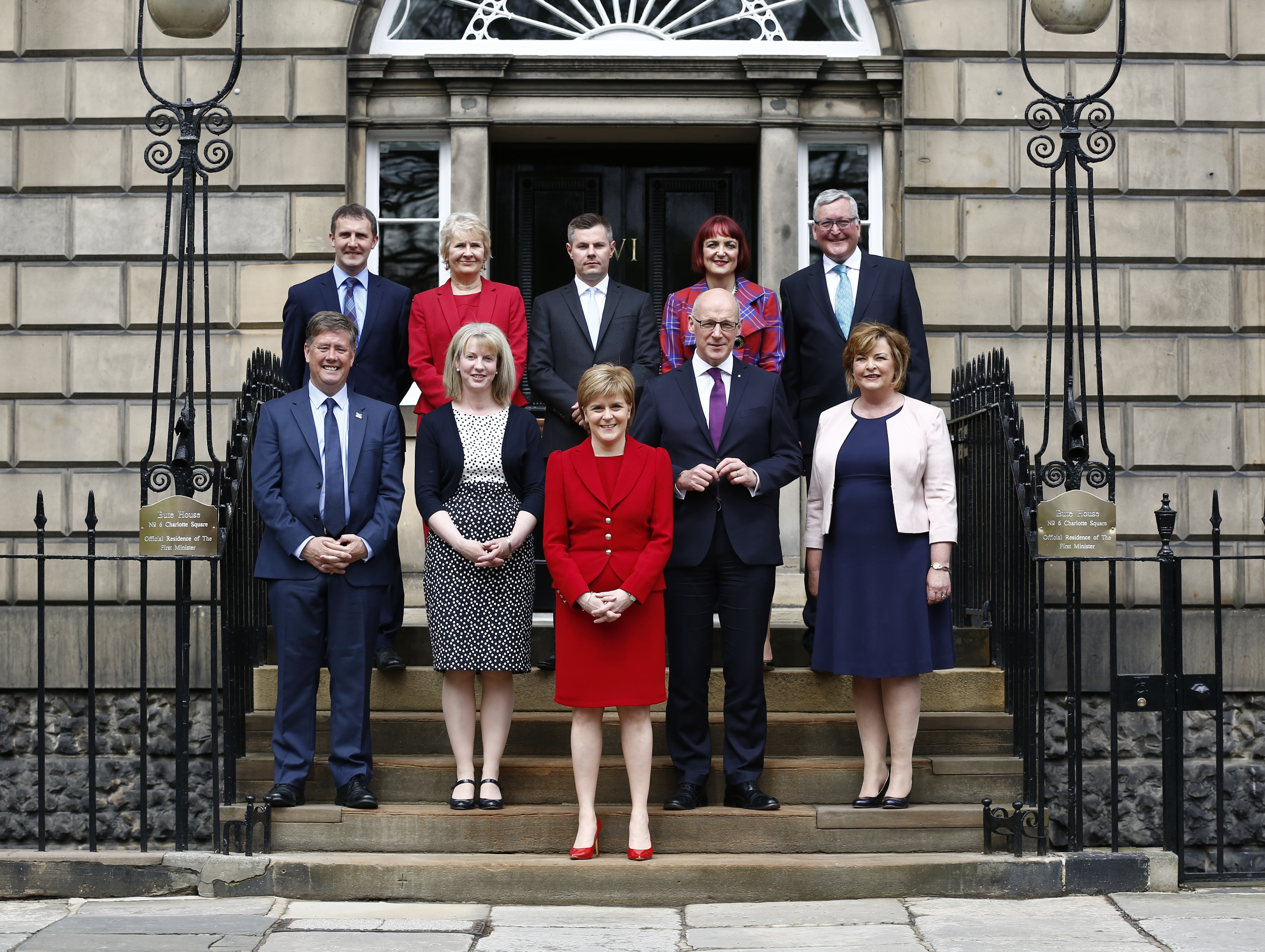
Sturgeon's original cabinet, 2016

In the May 2016 Scottish Parliament election, the Scottish National Party (SNP) won 63 of the 129 seats contested. Incumbent First Minister Nicola Sturgeon soon afterwards announced her intention to form a minority government. She was nominated for the post of first minister by a vote of the Scottish Parliament on 17 May, defeating Scottish Liberal Democrat leader, Willie Rennie by 63 votes to 5, with 59 abstentions. Ahead of the formation of the new government, long-serving ministers Alex Neil and Richard Lochhead announced their resignations from the cabinet. Sturgeon recommended the appointment of James Wolffe as Lord Advocate and Alison Di Rollo as Solicitor General on 31 May 2016. Their recommendation was confirmed by the Scottish Parliament on the same day.

=== 2018 cabinet reshuffle ===
On the 26 June 2018, Sturgeon announced a cabinet reshuffle. Long standing ministers such as Shona Robison and Angela Constance announced their resignation due to personal circumstances, with Keith Brown resigning to take his role as SNP Depute Leader. Cabinet Secretary for Social Security and Older People was promoted to cabinet-level with more social security powers handed to the Scottish Parliament.

=== 2020 cabinet reshuffle ===
On the 6 February 2020, on the day of the Scottish Budget, Nicola Sturgeon accepted Derek MacKay's resignation following an article by the Sun newspaper of inappropriate messages sent to a 16-year-old boy. Kate Forbes, then Minister for Public Finance, delivered the Scottish Budget, with Sturgeon later promoting Forbes to Finance Secretary.

=== Final months ===
Sturgeon accepted the resignation of Joe FitzPatrick, Minister of Public Health, Sport and Wellbeing, following Scotland's record high drug deaths. Sturgeon appointed Mairi Gougeon to succeed FitzPatrick, with Angela Constance re-entering government to serve as Minister for Drug Policy.

In the latter half of Sturgeon's government, she and her government led the Scottish Government's response to the COVID-19 pandemic.

== Cabinets ==
=== May 2016 to June 2018 ===
II Cabinet of Nicola Sturgeon
Portfolio	Portrait	Minister	Term	Ref.
Cabinet secretaries
First Minister		The Rt Hon Nicola Sturgeon MSP	2014–2023	
Deputy First Minister		John Swinney MSP	2014–2023	
Cabinet Secretary for Education and Skills		John Swinney MSP	2016–2021	
Cabinet Secretary for Finance and the Constitution		Derek Mackay MSP	2016–2020	
Cabinet Secretary for Health and Sport		Shona Robison MSP	2014–2018	
Cabinet Secretary for Environment, Climate Change and Land Reform		Roseanna Cunningham MSP	2016–2021	
Cabinet Secretary for Culture, Tourism and External Affairs		Fiona Hyslop MSP	2011–2021	
Cabinet Secretary for Communities, Social Security and Equalities		Angela Constance MSP	2016–2018	
Cabinet Secretary for Justice		Michael Matheson MSP	2014–2018	
Cabinet Secretary for Economy, Jobs and Fair Work		Keith Brown MSP	2016–2018	
Cabinet Secretary for the Rural Economy and Connectivity		Fergus Ewing MSP	2016–2021	
Also attending cabinet meetings (Note: The following members also attend the Scottish Cabinet, however, some are not required to attend every meeting.)
Permanent Secretary		Leslie Evans	2015–2022	
Minister for Parliamentary Business		Joe FitzPatrick MSP	2014–2018	
Lord Advocate		The Rt Hon James Wolffe QC	2016–2021	

=== June 2018 to February 2020 ===
II Cabinet of Nicola Sturgeon
Portfolio	Portrait	Minister	Term	Ref.
Cabinet secretaries
First Minister		The Rt Hon Nicola Sturgeon MSP	2014–2023	
Deputy First Minister		John Swinney MSP	2014–2023	
Cabinet Secretary for Education and Skills		John Swinney MSP	2016–2021	
Cabinet Secretary for Finance, Economy and Fair Work		Derek Mackay MSP	2016–2020	
Cabinet Secretary for Health and Sport		Jeane Freeman MSP	2018–2021	
Cabinet Secretary for Environment, Climate Change and Land Reform		Roseanna Cunningham MSP	2016–2021	
Cabinet Secretary for Culture, Tourism and External Affairs		Fiona Hyslop MSP	2011–2021	
Cabinet Secretary for Communities and Local Government		Aileen Campbell MSP	2018–2021	
Cabinet Secretary for Justice		Humza Yousaf MSP	2018–2021	
Cabinet Secretary for Rural Economy		Fergus Ewing MSP	2016–2021	
Cabinet Secretary for Social Security and Older People		Shirley-Anne Somerville MSP	2021–2021	
Cabinet Secretary for Government Business and Constitutional Relations		Michael Russell MSP	2018–2021	
Cabinet Secretary for Transport, Infrastructure and Connectivity		Michael Matheson MSP	2018–2023	
Also attending cabinet meetings
Permanent Secretary		Leslie Evans	2015–2022	
Minister for Parliamentary Business		Graeme Dey MSP	2018–2021	
Lord Advocate		The Rt Hon James Wolffe QC	2016–2021	

=== February 2020 to May 2021 ===
II Cabinet of Nicola Sturgeon
Portfolio	Portrait	Minister	Term	Ref.
Cabinet secretaries
First Minister		The Rt Hon Nicola Sturgeon MSP	2014–2023	
Deputy First Minister		John Swinney MSP	2014–2023	
Cabinet Secretary for Education and Skills		John Swinney MSP	2016–2021	
Cabinet Secretary for Finance		Kate Forbes MSP	2020–2023	
Cabinet Secretary for Health and Sport		Jeane Freeman MSP	2018–2021	
Cabinet Secretary for Environment, Climate Change and Land Reform		Roseanna Cunningham MSP	2016–2021	
Cabinet Secretary for Economy, Fair Work and Culture		Fiona Hyslop MSP	2011–2021	
Cabinet Secretary for Communities and Local Government		Aileen Campbell MSP	2018–2021	
Cabinet Secretary for Justice		Humza Yousaf MSP	2018–2021	
Cabinet Secretary for Rural Economy and Tourism		Fergus Ewing MSP	2016–2021	
Cabinet Secretary for Social Security and Older People		Shirley-Anne Somerville MSP	2018–2021	
Cabinet Secretary for the Constitution, Europe and External Affairs		Michael Russell MSP	2020–2021	
Cabinet Secretary for Transport, Infrastructure and Connectivity		Michael Matheson MSP	2018–2023	
Also attending cabinet meetings
Permanent Secretary		Leslie Evans	2015–2022	
Minister for Parliamentary Business		Graeme Dey MSP	2018–2021	
Lord Advocate		The Rt Hon James Wolffe QC	2016–2021	

== Junior Ministers ==
Junior ministers
Post	Minister	Term
Minister for Childcare and Early Years	Maree Todd MSP	2017–2021
Minister for Further Education, Higher Education and Science	Shirley-Anne Somerville MSP	2016–2018
Minister for Parliamentary Business and Veterans	Joe FitzPatrick MSP	2016–2018
Minister for Parliamentary Business and Veterans	Graeme Dey MSP	2018–2021
Minister for Energy, Connectivity and the Islands	Humza Yousaf MSP	2016–2018
Minister for Energy, Connectivity and the Islands	Paul Wheelhouse MSP	2018–2021
Minister for Business, Fair Work and Skills	Paul Wheelhouse MSP	2016–2018
Minister for Business, Fair Work and Skills	Jamie Hepburn MSP	2018–2021
Minister for Public Health, Sport and Wellbeing	Aileen Campbell MSP	2016–2018
Minister for Public Health, Sport and Wellbeing	Joe FitzPatrick MSP	2018–2020
Minister for Public Health, Sport and Wellbeing	Mairi Gougeon MSP	2020-2021
Minister for Mental Health	Maureen Watt MSP	2016–2018
Minister for Mental Health	Clare Haughey MSP	2018–2021
Minister for Community Safety	Annabelle Ewing MSP	2016–2018
Minister for Community Safety	Ash Denham MSP	2018–2021
Minister for Local Government, Housing and Planning	Kevin Stewart MSP	2016–2021
Minister for Social Security	Jeane Freeman OBE MSP	2016–2018
Minister for Europe, Migration and International Development	Alasdair Allan MSP	2016–2018
Minister for Europe, Migration and International Development	Ben Macpherson MSP	2018–2020
Minister for Europe, Migration and International Development	Jenny Gilruth MSP	2020–2021
Minister for UK Negotiations on Scotland's Place in Europe	Michael Russell MSP	2016–2018
Minister for Older People and Equalities	Christina McKelvie MSP	2018–2021
Minister for Trade, Investment and Innovation	Ivan McKee MSP	2018–2021
Minister for Public Finance and Migration	Kate Forbes MSP	2018–2020
Minister for Public Finance and Migration	Ben Macpherson MSP	2020–2021
Minister for Rural Affairs and the Natural Environment	Ben Macpherson MSP	2020–2021
Minister for Rural Affairs and the Natural Environment	Mairi Gougeon MSP	2018-2020
Minister for Drug Policy	Angela Constance MSP	2020–2021

== Scottish Law Officers ==
Law officers
Post	Name	Portrait	Term
Lord Advocate	James Wolffe QC		2016–2021
Solicitor General for Scotland	Alison Di Rollo QC		2016–2021

== See also ==
- Premiership of Nicola Sturgeon
