= Cabinet Secretary for Covid Recovery =

Scottish government position

Cabinet Secretary for Covid Recovery Rùnaire a ’Chaibineit airson Ath-bheothachadh Covid
- Style: Cabinet Secretary (within parliament); Covid Recovery Secretary (informal); Scottish Covid Recovery Secretary (outwith Scotland)
- Member of: Scottish Parliament; Scottish Cabinet
- Seat: Edinburgh
- Appointer: First Minister
- Formation: May 2021
- Abolished: March 2023
- Salary: £112,919 annually (including £64,470 MSP salary)
- Website: www.gov.scot

The Cabinet Secretary for Covid Recovery was a position in the Scottish Cabinet responsible for Scotland's recovery from the COVID-19 pandemic. The position was created by First Minister Nicola Sturgeon as part of her third administration, but was not renewed by her successor, Humza Yousaf. The only Cabinet Secretary for Covid Recovery was Deputy First Minister John Swinney, who was appointed in May 2021.

== Overview ==
=== Responsibilities ===
- Cross government co-ordination on Covid-19 recovery & Covid-19 strategic reviews

When the office existed, it was held concurrently with the office of Deputy First Minister which held responsibility for additional cross-government portfolios.

== List of Office holders ==
=== Cabinet Secretary for Covid Recovery ===
Name	Portrait	Entered office	Left office	Party	First Minister
John Swinney		18 May 2021	28 March 2023	Scottish National Party	Nicola Sturgeon
