= Minister for Trade, Investment and Innovation =

Junior ministerial position in Scotland

The Minister for Trade, Investment and Innovation is a Junior ministerial post in the Scottish Government. As a result, the Minister does not attend the Scottish Cabinet. The post was created in June 2018, and supports the Cabinet Secretary for Finance, Economy and Fair Work who is full member of cabinet.

The Minister for Trade, Investment and Innovation has specific responsibility for:

- Trade and inward investment
- Innovation and increasing productivity
- Internationalisation and European Structural Funds
- Financial services
- Life sciences
- Low Carbon Economy

== List of office holders ==
The current Minister for Trade, Investment and Innovation is Ivan McKee.

=== Minister for Trade, Investment and Innovation ===
Name	Portrait	Entered office	Left office	Party	First Minister
Ivan McKee		27 June 2018	Incumbent	Scottish National Party	Nicola Sturgeon

== See also ==
- Scottish Parliament
