= Alison Di Rollo =

British lawyer

Alison Di Rollo KC
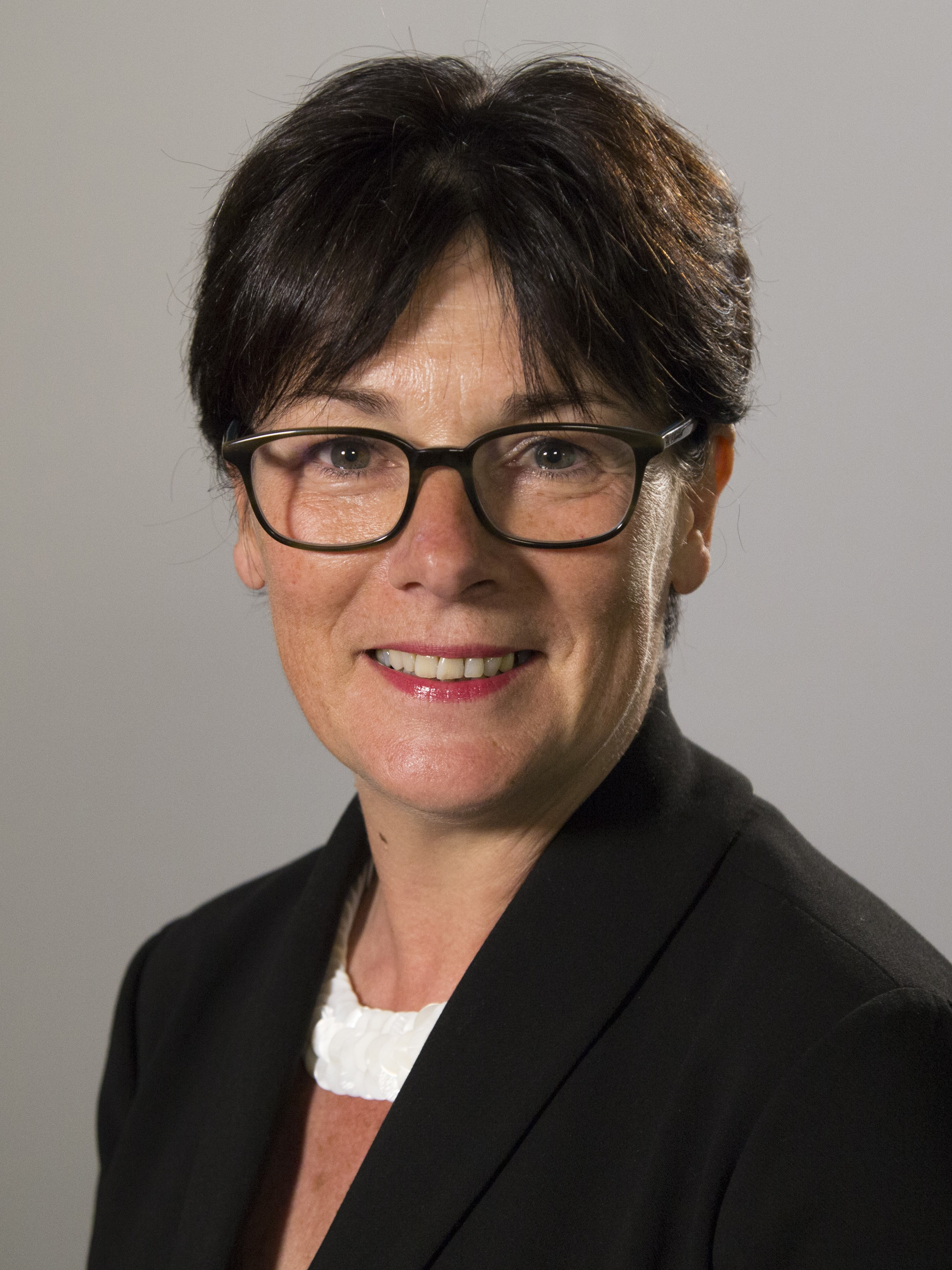
- Official portrait, 2016

Solicitor General for Scotland
- In office 1 June 2016 – 22 June 2021
- Monarch: Elizabeth II
- First Minister: Nicola Sturgeon
- Preceded by: Lesley Thomson
- Succeeded by: Ruth Charteris

Personal details
- Education: University of Glasgow

Alison Di Rollo KC (née Lafferty) is a Scottish advocate who served as Solicitor General for Scotland from 2016 to 2021.

== Education ==
Di Rollo attended Hutchesons' Grammar School and was the Head Girl in 1978/9. She was also the Vice-Captain of the hockey team. She studied at Glasgow University.

== Legal career ==
In 1985, Di Rollo completed legal traineeship in private practice at the now defunct law firm of McGrigor Donald based in Glasgow, and joined the Crown Office and Procurator Fiscal Service (COPFS). She worked in various offices before being appointed deputy head of the High Court Unit in Crown Office, and later Head of Operational Policy. In May 2008, she was seconded from the Crown Office to take up appointment as a trial advocate depute.

Di Rollo successfully convicted Marek Harcar, the murderer of businesswoman Moira Jones in a Glasgow park.

In February 2010, Di Rollo joined the Crown Office National Sexual Crimes Unit, becoming the first deputy head of the unit. She was appointed head of the National Sexual Crimes Unit in January 2013. In 2015, she was appointed senior advocate depute.

== Solicitor General ==
Di Rollo was nominated for the post by Scottish First Minister, Nicola Sturgeon on 31 May 2016 as part of the formation of the Second Sturgeon government, following the 2016 Scottish Parliament election. Her nomination was confirmed by the Scottish Parliament on 1 June 2016.

In May 2021, Di Rollo announced her intention to step down as Solicitor General for Scotland.

Legal offices
Preceded by Lesley Thomson	Solicitor General for Scotland; 2016–2021	Succeeded by Ruth Charteris
