= Lesley Thomson (lawyer) =

Scottish lawyer

Lesley Thomson KC
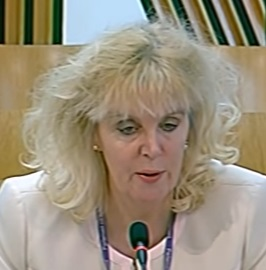

Solicitor General for Scotland
- In office 19 May 2011 – 1 June 2016
- Monarch: Elizabeth II
- First Minister: Alex Salmond; Nicola Sturgeon
- Lord Advocate: Frank Mulholland
- Preceded by: Frank Mulholland, Lord Mulholland
- Succeeded by: Alison Di Rollo

Personal details
- Born: Glasgow
- Education: University of Glasgow

Lesley Thomson KC is a Scottish lawyer who served as the Solicitor General for Scotland from 2011 to 2016. She was appointed to the office on 19 May 2011, after the Scottish Parliament election, succeeding Frank Mulholland who was promoted to Lord Advocate.

== Legal career ==
Thomson began her career as a lawyer with SSEB and then became a Procurator Fiscal in 1985. She spent most of her career on fraudulent related crimes, prosecuting those involved and seizing the assets of criminals. She served as the Area Procurator Fiscal for Selkirk, Edinburgh and later as interim for Lothian & Borders. In May 2008, she was appointed area procurator fiscal for Glasgow.

Thomson led on trial advocacy and deaths investigation within the Crown Office and Procurator Fiscal Service (COPFS). She is an acknowledged specialist in the prosecution of serious crime, including organised crime and financial crime, and an expert in the proceeds of crime legislation, having authored a textbook on criminal confiscation. In 2013 she became the first woman to be appointed to Scottish Rugby's board.

== Notes ==
Legal offices
Preceded by Frank Mulholland	Solicitor General for Scotland; 2011–2016	Succeeded by Alison Di Rollo
