= Minister for Business and Employment =

Portfolio in the Scottish Government

Minister for Business and Fair Work
- Scottish Gaelic: Ministear airson Gnothachais

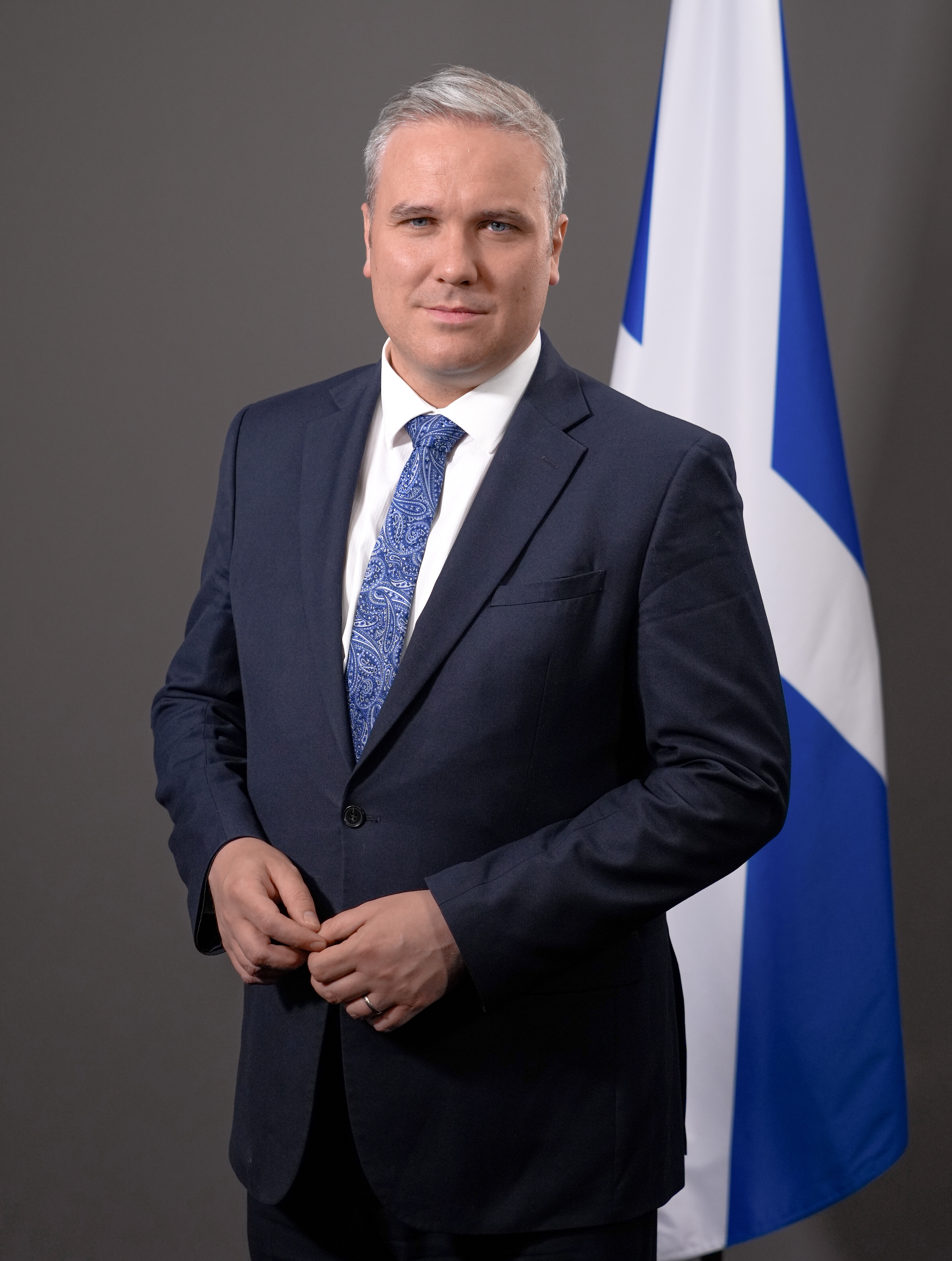
- Incumbent; Tom Arthur since 20 May 2026
- Style: Minister (within parliament); Business Minister(informal); Scottish Business Minister (outwith Scotland)
- Member of: Scottish Parliament; Scottish Government
- Reports to: Scottish Parliament
- Seat: Edinburgh
- Appointer: First Minister
- Inaugural holder: Jim Mather Minister for Enterprise Energy and Tourism
- Formation: 17 May 2007
- Salary: £106,185 per annum (2024) (including £72,196 MSP salary)
- Website: www.gov.scot

The Minister for Business and Fair Work is a Junior ministerial post in the Scottish Government. As a result, the Minister does not attend the Scottish Cabinet. The post was retitled in June 2025, with the Minister supporting the Deputy First Minister and Cabinet Secretary for Economy and Gaelic, Kate Forbes.

== History ==
From 1999 to 2007, enterprise and energy were the responsibility of the Minister for Enterprise and Lifelong Learning. The Second McConnell government from 2003 to 2007 instituted Tourism as a portfolio, combined with Culture and Sport, as the Minister for Tourism, Culture and Sport.

The Salmond government, elected following the 2007 Scottish Parliament election created the junior post of Minister for Enterprise, Energy and Tourism by combining the roles. In November 2014 his post became the Minister for Business, Energy and Tourism, as part of the first Sturgeon government. The post was retitled as Minister for Business, Innovation and Energy as part of the second Sturgeon government, and renamed again in June 2018 to Minister for Business, Fair Work and Skills. Upon the creation of the third Sturgeon Government, the post was once more retitled as Minister for Business, Trade, Tourism and Enterprise.

In March 2023, Humza Yousaf renamed the role Minister for Small Business, Innovation and Trade and appointed Richard Lochhead to the position. In his streamlining of government upon becoming First Minister in May 2024, John Swinney renamed the post Minister for Business. In June 2025, Swinney abolished the position of Minister for Employment and Investment and the employment portfolio was absorbed into the new role of Minister for Business and Employment, with Lochhead continuing in post.

== List of office holders ==
=== Minister for Enterprise, Energy and Tourism ===
Name	Portrait	Entered office	Left office	Party	First Minister
Jim Mather		17 May 2007	20 May 2011	Scottish National Party	Alex Salmond
=== Minister for Business, Energy and Tourism ===
Fergus Ewing		20 May 2011	18 May 2016	Scottish National Party	Alex Salmond; Nicola Sturgeon
=== Minister for Business, Innovation and Energy ===
Paul Wheelhouse		18 May 2016	27 June 2018	Scottish National Party	Nicola Sturgeon
=== Minister for Business, Fair Work and Skills ===
Jamie Hepburn		27 June 2018	20 May 2021	Scottish National Party	Nicola Sturgeon
=== Minister for Business, Trade, Tourism and Enterprise ===
Ivan McKee		20 May 2021	29 March 2023	Scottish National Party	Nicola Sturgeon
=== Minister for Small Business, Innovation and Trade ===
Richard Lochhead		29 March 2023	8 May 2024	Scottish National Party	Humza Yousaf
=== Minister for Business ===
Richard Lochhead		8 May 2024	11 June 2025	Scottish National Party	John Swinney
=== Minister for Business and Employment ===
Richard Lochhead		11 June 2025	20 May 2026	Scottish National Party	John Swinney
=== Minister for Business and Fair Work ===
Tom Arthur		20 May 2026	Incumbent	Scottish National Party	John Swinney

== See also ==
- Scottish Parliament
