= Annabelle Ewing =

Scottish politician (born 1960)

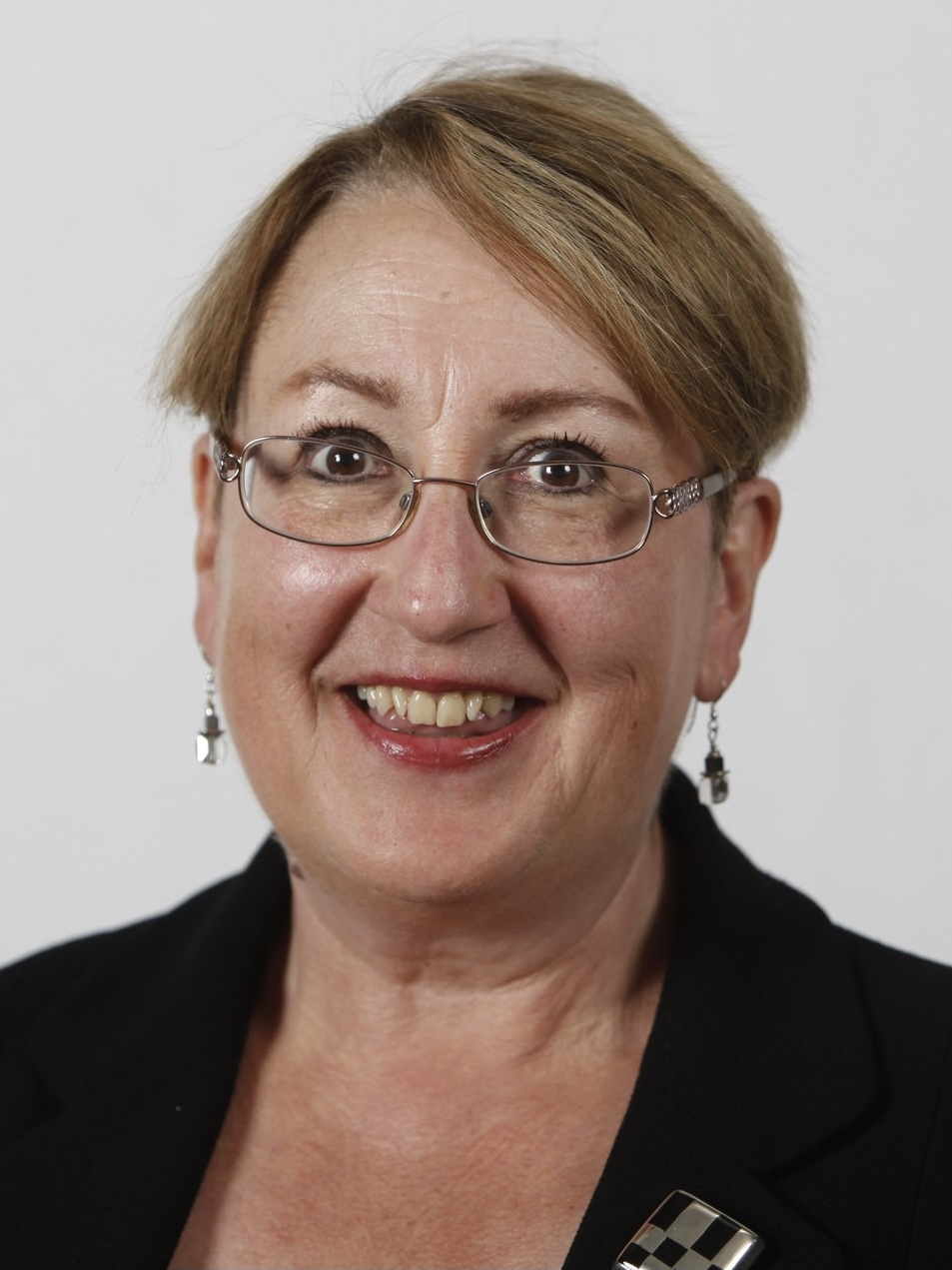
- Official portrait, 2016

Deputy Presiding Officer of the Scottish Parliament
- In office 14 May 2021 – 14 May 2026 Serving with Liam McArthur
- Presiding Officer: Alison Johnstone
- Preceded by: Linda Fabiani
- Succeeded by: Clare Adamson

Minister for Community Safety and Legal Affairs
- In office 18 May 2016 – 26 June 2018
- First Minister: Nicola Sturgeon
- Preceded by: Paul Wheelhouse
- Succeeded by: Ash Regan

Minister for Youth and Women's Employment
- In office 21 November 2014 – 18 May 2016
- First Minister: Nicola Sturgeon
- Preceded by: Angela Constance (as Minister for Youth Employment until 22 April 2014)
- Succeeded by: Jamie Hepburn (as Minister for Employability and Training)

Member of the Scottish Parliament for Cowdenbeath
- In office 6 May 2016 – 9 April 2026
- Preceded by: Alex Rowley
- Succeeded by: David Barratt

Member of the Scottish Parliament for Mid Scotland and Fife (1 of 7 Regional MSPs)
- In office 5 May 2011 – 24 March 2016

Member of Parliament for Perth
- In office 7 June 2001 – 11 April 2005
- Preceded by: Roseanna Cunningham
- Succeeded by: Constituency abolished

Personal details
- Born: 20 August 1960 (age 66) Glasgow, Scotland
- Party: Scottish National Party
- Parent(s): Winnie Ewing; Stewart Ewing
- Relatives: Fergus Ewing (brother)
- Education: University of Glasgow
- Profession: Solicitor

Annabelle Janet Ewing (born 20 August 1960) is a Scottish politician and lawyer who served as a Deputy Presiding Officer of the Scottish Parliament from 2021 to 2026. A member of the Scottish National Party (SNP), she served as the Member of the Scottish Parliament (MSP) for the Cowdenbeath constituency from 2016 to 2026, having previously been an MSP for the Mid Scotland and Fife region from 2011 to 2016. Ewing also served in the UK House of Commons as the Member of Parliament for Perth, from 2001 to 2005.

She held two junior ministerial roles and was Minister for Youth and Women's Employment from 2014 to 2016 and then Minister for Community Safety and Legal Affairs from 2016 to 2018. On the backbenches, she has sometimes been critical of the government, especially since the 2021 election, over issues like reforms to the gender recognition process. Her brother, Fergus Ewing, was also an MSP and their mother, Winnie Ewing, previously served as an MSP, MP and MEP.

== Background ==
Ewing was born on 20 August 1960 to Winnifred Margaret Ewing (née Woodburn) and Stewart Martin Ewing. She attended Craigholme School for Girls in Glasgow and the University of Glasgow, where she graduated with a law degree. Before becoming an MP, Ewing was a European Community competition lawyer in Brussels and ran a small legal practice.

Ewing's family have been strongly connected to the nationalist movement in Scotland. Her mother was a former Scottish National Party (SNP) President, Winnie Ewing, who throughout her lifetime served as a member of three different parliaments for the party: Westminster, the Scottish Parliament and the European Parliament. Her brother is MSP Fergus Ewing, and her sister-in-law was the late Margaret Ewing, who had been an MSP and an MP. Her late father, Stewart Ewing was elected as an SNP district councillor for the Summerston Ward in Glasgow 1977, when he gained it from Dick Dynes, then-leader of the Labour Group on Glasgow District Council, a result described at the time by The Glasgow Herald as "an absolute sensation".

== Early parliamentary and political career ==
=== Early candidature (1999-2001) ===
Ewing stood for the Stirling constituency in the 1999 Scottish Parliament election, and came second to the Labour candidate Sylvia Jackson. Later that year, she was selected by the SNP to contest a by-election for the Hamilton South constituency in the UK Parliament, the same area where her mother had won a famous by-election victory in 1967. Labour had a comfortable majority at the 1997 election, but there was a swing of 16% to the SNP in the by-election, and Labour's Bill Tynan won the seat with a majority of just over 550 votes.

=== MP for Perth (2001-2005) ===
In 2001, Ewing stood for the UK Parliament again, this time in Perth, where Roseanna Cunningham had been the MP. Ewing was elected, defeating the Conservative candidate, future MSP Liz Smith, by just 48 votes. This gave her the narrowest majority in Scotland.

Ewing was involved in a number of Parliamentary campaigns, including fighting for the rights of people with Hepatitis C, and working to gain a public enquiry into the events at Princess Royal Barracks, Deepcut, where James Collinson, a constituent, died on 23 March 2002.

On 16 December 2004, the Deputy Speaker Sir Alan Haselhurst removed her from the House as she refused to apologise for calling the then Defence Secretary Geoff Hoon a "back-stabbing coward" during exchanges over his plans to merge Scottish Regiments, including the Black Watch. As an MP, Ewing was also opposed to Britain's involvement in the Iraq war.

In the 2005 election, she contested the newly created constituency of Ochil and South Perthshire but lost to the Scottish Labour candidate, Gordon Banks, who won a slim majority of 688.

=== As a candidate (2005-2011) ===
Ewing sought to become SNP candidate for Moray in the 2006 Scottish Parliament by-election to succeed her late sister-in-law, Margaret Ewing. She was defeated by North East Scotland MSP Richard Lochhead who went on to win the seat in the by-election.

She was later selected to contest the Falkirk East seat in the 2007 Holyrood election on behalf of the SNP as a replacement for the previously selected candidate, the late Douglas Henderson. In the election she achieved a 9% swing from Labour to the SNP, however this was not enough to displace the incumbent Cathy Peattie.

She contested Ochil and South Perthshire for a second time at the 2010 election, again losing to Gordon Banks, who increased his majority to over 5,000 votes.

=== MSP for Mid Scotland and Fife (2011-2016) ===
At the 2011 election Ewing was elected to the Scottish Parliament as an MSP for the Mid Scotland and Fife region.

In 2014, Ewing voted in favour of the Marriage and Civil Partnership Bill which legalised same-sex marriage in Scotland.

== Ministerial career ==
=== Minister for Youth and Women's Employment (2014-2016) ===
She was promoted to the Scottish Government on 21 November 2014 in Nicola Sturgeon's first Cabinet reshuffle. She became Minister for Youth and Women's Employment.

In 2015, while Ewing was serving in this role, the percentage of women in employment in Scotland was the second highest of any EU nation.

=== Minister for Community Safety and Legal Affairs (2016-2018) ===
In 2016, Ewing defeated Scottish Labour deputy leader Alex Rowley to win election in the Cowdenbeath constituency. Following the election, she was moved to the Community Safety and Legal Affairs portfolio in 2016. She left the government in June 2018.

As the Minister for Legal Affairs, Ewing led the Civil Litigation (Expenses and Group Proceedings) (Scotland) Bill through the Parliament which aimed to "make the cost of civil court action more accessible." The bill passed stage three in 2018.

In March 2018, MSPs voted by 62 to 60 to repeal the Offensive Behaviour at Football and Threatening Communications (Scotland) Act 2012 despite opposition from Ewing and the Scottish Government. Scottish Labour MSP James Kelly had introduced the member's bill to repeal the original legislation as he, and other opposition MSPs, claimed that it targeted football fans and failed to tackle the issues of sectarianism that it was designed to when passed by the SNP majority government in 2011. Ewing said that the repeal of the Act was "deeply disappointing and worrying."

== On the backbenches ==
=== Backbencher (2018-2026) ===
After leaving government, Ewing served on the Culture, Tourism, Europe and External Affairs Committee and Local Government and Communities Committee from 2018 to 2020. From 2020 to 2021, she then served on the Justice Committee and COVID-19 Committee.

In the 2021 election, Ewing was re-elected as MSP for Cowdenbeath, and as a backbencher engaged in a series of rebellions throughout the sixth session of the Parliament.

==== Rebellions ====
Ewing was one of nine SNP MSPs who voted against the Gender Recognition Reform (Scotland) Bill in 2022. The bill attempted to make it easier for individuals to change their legal gender, although was not implemented after the UK Government blocked it from receiving royal assent. In 2025, Ewing critiqued NHS Fife in relation to the employment tribunal Peggie v NHS Fife, where a nurse had complained about sharing changing facilities with a transgender woman.

In April 2024, along with five other SNP MSPs, Ewing abstained on stage one of the Victims, Witnesses, and Justice Reform (Scotland) Bill due to an objection to plans contained within the bill to pilot conducting rape trials without juries. In total, 62 MSPs abstained- more than the 60 who backed the legislation. The government later withdrew the plan for juryless trials from the bill.

Along with her brother, Fergus, and two other SNP MSPs, Ewing broke the SNP whip to back Conservative MSP Liz Smith's Schools (Residential Outdoor Education) (Scotland) Bill at stage one. The bill sought to introduce a right for every child in Scotland to receive one weeks outdoor education during their time at school. The government were eventually forced to back the bill and it passed stage three in December 2025.

In October 2025, Ewing was the sole SNP MSP to rebel on a motion criticising cuts to the fire service in Scotland. The proposed cuts would have impacted the first station at Lochgelly in her constituency. Ewing was praised by the Fire Brigades Union (FBU) for this stance.

Ewing was the only SNP MSP to vote against the two day suspension of independent MSP Ash Regan, formerly of the SNP, from the Parliament in January 2026. Regan had been sanctioned for breaching the MSP code of conduct by making public her intention to lodge a complaint against Green MSP Maggie Chapman over remarks she made in relation to the For Women Scotland Ltd v The Scottish Ministers case.

In February 2026, alongside five other SNP MSPs, Ewing broke the whip to vote in favour of Regan's Prostitution (Offences and Support) (Scotland) Bill which sought to introduce the "Nordic model" in Scotland by criminalising the purchase of sex while quashing the convictions of those previously charged with solicitation. The Bill was defeated at stage one with 54 MSPs voting in favour and 64 against.

==== Other political positions ====
Ewing backed Kate Forbes in the 2023 SNP leadership contest, following the resignation of Nicola Sturgeon.

In May 2025, she voted against the Assisted Dying for Terminally Ill Adults (Scotland) Bill at stage one.

Having served as an MSP for 15 years, Ewing decided not to stand in the 2026 Scottish Parliament election.

=== Deputy Presiding Officer (2021-2026) ===
Following the start of the new parliamentary session in 2021, Ewing was elected, alongside Liberal Democrat MSP Liam McArthur, as one of the two Deputy Presiding Officers of the Scottish Parliament. On 20 April 2023, after a particularly robust intervention from Fergus Ewing on the subject of gas extraction, she had to remind him officially about treating fellow members with respect. First Minister Humza Yousaf then quipped that he suspected it was not the first time she had had to tell her brother off.

Parliament of the United Kingdom
Preceded by Roseanna Cunningham	Member of Parliament for Perth; 2001–2005	Constituency abolished
Scottish Parliament
Preceded by Alex Rowley	Member of the Scottish Parliament for Cowdenbeath; 2016–2026	Succeeded by David Barratt
