= Minister for Social Care and Mental Wellbeing =

Portfolio in the Scottish Government

- Scottish Gaelic: Ministear airson Cùram Sòisealta, Sunnd Inntinn agus Spòrs

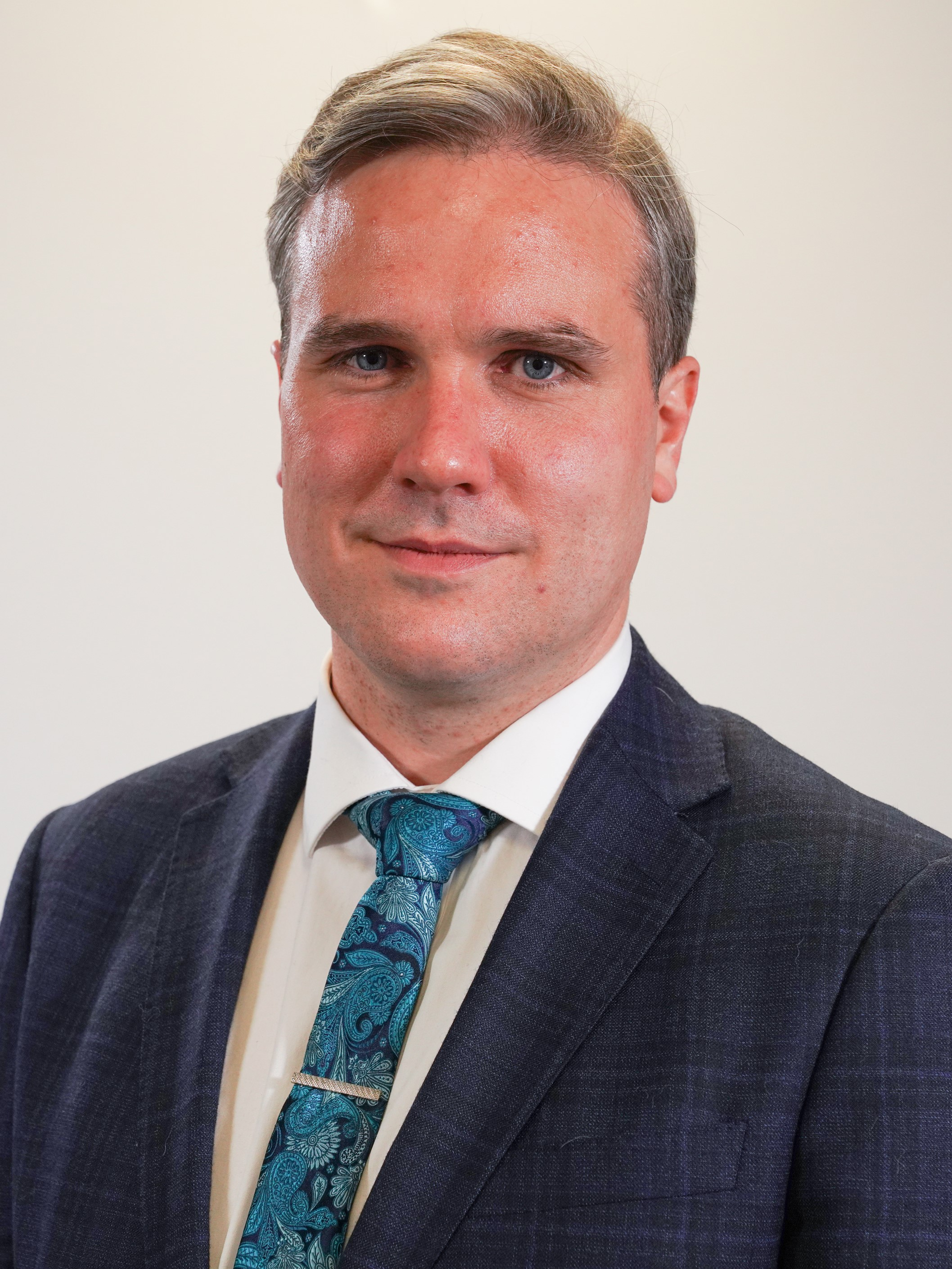
- Incumbent; Tom Arthur since 11 June 2025
- Style: Minister (within parliament); Social Care Minister (informal); Scottish Social Care Minister (outwith Scotland)
- Member of: Scottish Parliament; Scottish Government
- Reports to: Scottish Parliament
- Seat: Edinburgh
- Appointer: First Minister
- Inaugural holder: Jamie Hepburn Minister for Sport, Health Improvement and Mental Health
- Formation: 21 November 2014
- Salary: £106,185 per annum (2024) (including £72,196 MSP salary)
- Website: www.gov.scot

The Minister for Social Care and Mental Wellbeing is a member of the Scottish Government. The Minister reports to the Cabinet Secretary for Health and Social Care, who has overall responsibility for the portfolio, and is a member of cabinet. As a Junior Minister the post holder is not a member of the Scottish Government Cabinet.

The incumbent Minister for Social Care and Mental Wellbeing is Tom Arthur.

== History ==
The Minister for Mental Health is the second Scottish Government ministerial post to include mental health in the title. The post had been announced on 21 November 2014 as the Minister for Sport and Health Improvement and similar ministerial posts had also existed in the very recent past under different titles. Mental health was added to the title so that the post became Minister for Sport, Health Improvement and Mental Health.

The Sport portfolio was the responsibility of Deputy Minister for Communities and Sport from 2000 to 2001 in the Dewar Government (which was not a cabinet position). From 2000 to 2001 the Minister for the Environment, Sport and Culture was the Cabinet Minister with whose responsibilities included sport. From 2001 to 2003 these roles were combined in the Minister for Communities and Sport, which was renamed the Minister for Tourism, Culture and Sport after the addition of the tourism portfolio, following the 2003 election.

The Salmond Government, elected following the Scottish Parliament election in 2007, created the junior post of Minister for Communities and Sport held by Stewart Maxwell MSP, combining the Sport and Communities portfolios. The Minister assisted the new Cabinet Secretary for Health and Wellbeing. In 2009, the Sport portfolio was given to the Minister for Public Health under the new title Minister for Public Health and Sport. This post was held by Shona Robison. After the 2011 Scottish election, sport was separated from the portfolio and given to a new Ministerial creation, the Minister for Commonwealth Games and Sport (this remained Shona Robison).

Finally, this was promoted to a Cabinet Secretary position from 22 April to 21 November 2014 under the title of Cabinet Secretary for Commonwealth Games, Sport, Equalities and Pensioners' Rights (still Shona Robison), until the reshuffle of 21 November 2014 when Nicola Sturgeon announced her first Cabinet. Sport returned to its original position as a junior Ministerial post.

The Minister for Mental Health post was created in the Second Sturgeon government in the reshuffle that followed the 2016 Scottish Parliament election.

Following the formation of the First Yousaf Government in March 2023, the post was renamed Minister for Social Care, Mental Wellbeing and Sport and Maree Todd was appointed to the role.

In June 2025, the role was renamed Minister for Social Care and Mental Wellbeing and the sport brief was moved to the new ministerial position Minister for Drugs & Alcohol Policy and Sport. Tom Arthur became the new minister, with Todd retaining the sport portfolio in her new role as Drugs Minister.

== Overview ==
Responsibilities include:

- social care and integration
- National Care Service
- mental health wellbeing
- child and adolescent mental health
- suicide prevention
- dementia
- augmentative and alternative communication
- Mental Welfare Commission
- survivors of childhood abuse
- forensic mental health services and reform
- Care Inspectorate
- self-directed support
- adult support and protection
- care, support and rights
- social service workforce
- delivering ‘Anne’s Law’
- Independent Living Fund
- social prescribing

== List of office holders ==
=== Minister for Sport, Health Improvement and Mental Health ===
Name	Portrait	Entered office	Left office	Party	First Minister
Jamie Hepburn		21 November 2014	18 May 2016	Scottish National Party	Nicola Sturgeon
=== Minister for Mental Health ===
Name	Portrait	Entered office	Left office	Party	First Minister
Maureen Watt		18 May 2016	27 June 2018	Scottish National Party	Nicola Sturgeon
Clare Haughey		27 June 2018	20 May 2021	Scottish National Party	Nicola Sturgeon
=== Minister for Mental Wellbeing and Social Care ===
Kevin Stewart		20 May 2021	29 March 2023	Scottish National Party	Nicola Sturgeon
=== Minister for Social Care, Mental Wellbeing and Sport ===
Maree Todd		29 March 2023	11 June 2025	Scottish National Party	Humza Yousaf; John Swinney
=== Minister for Social Care and Mental Wellbeing ===
Tom Arthur		11 June 2025	Incumbent	Scottish National Party	John Swinney

== See also ==
- Scottish Parliament
- Scottish Government
