= Minister for Employment and Investment =

Junior ministerial post in the Scottish Government

The Minister for Employment and Investment, commonly referred to as the Employment Minister was a junior ministerial post in the Scottish Government. As a result, the Minister did not attend the Scottish Cabinet. The minister reported to the Cabinet Secretary for Economy and Gaelic.

In June 2025, the post was abolished by First Minister John Swinney and its responsibilities split between other ministers covering the economy brief.

== Responsibilities ==
As well as supporting the Cabinet Secretary for Economy and Gaelic, specific responsibilities of the Minister for Employment and Investment were:

=== Fair work ===
- effective worker voice, including trade unions
- employability programmes
- four day working week
- Living Wage and Living Hours
- Partnership Action for Continuing Employment (PACE)
- workplace employment and equalities incl. gender, disability and race employment, addressing the pay gap

=== Investment and regeneration ===
- cities investment and strategy
- City Centre Recovery Taskforce
- regeneration policy and the place based investment programme
- retail policy, recovery and strategy
- town centre regeneration including business improvement districts
- community wealth building
- social enterprise
- employee-owned businesses

== History ==
The post of Minister for Youth and Women's Employment within the Scottish Government was recreated on 21 November 2014, but had existed in the very recent past (until April 2014) under a different title. The post of Minister for Employability and Training was abolished as part of the cabinet reshuffle in June 2018. The post was reinstated for the Swinney government in 2024 under Minister for Employment and Investment to assist the newly appointed Deputy First Minister, Kate Forbes.

The Junior Ministerial post of Minister for Youth Employment was created on 7 December 2011 following the recommendations of the Smith Group. From April 2014, this was promoted to a Cabinet Secretary position, as Cabinet Secretary for Training, Youth and Women's Employment. The November 2014 Cabinet reshuffle saw the Cabinet Secretary position changed to Cabinet Secretary for Fair Work, Skills and Training. In May 2016, Nicola Sturgeon retitled the post to Minister for Employability and Training.

In 2021, the office was revived by Sturgeon and Richard Lochhead was appointed Minister for Just Transition, Employment and Fair Work. Humza Yousaf removed the role during his period as First Minister, but John Swinney brought it back in May 2024 with Tom Arthur appointed as Minister for Employment and Investment.

In June 2025, the post was abolished by Swinney. The employment portfolio was given to Lochhead as Minister for Business, now Minister for Business and Employment, and the investment responsibilities absorbed by Kate Forbes in her role as Cabinet Secretary for Economy and Gaelic.

== List of office holders ==
| Name | Portrait | Entered office | Left office | Party | First Minister |
Minister for Youth and Women's Employment
| Annabelle Ewing | | 21 November 2014 | 18 May 2016 | Scottish National Party | Nicola Sturgeon |
Minister for Employability and Training
| Jamie Hepburn | | 18 May 2016 | 27 June 2018 | Scottish National Party | Nicola Sturgeon |
Minister for Just Transition, Employment and Fair Work
| Richard Lochhead | | 20 May 2021 | 29 March 2023 | Scottish National Party | Nicola Sturgeon |
Minister for Employment and Investment
| Tom Arthur | | 8 May 2024 | 11 June 2025 | Scottish National Party | John Swinney |

== See also ==
- Scottish Parliament
- Scottish Government
