= Cabinet Secretary for Health and Care =

Cabinet position in the Scottish Government

Scotland Cabinet Secretary for Health and Care
- Scottish Gaelic: Rùnaire a’ Chaibineit airson Slàinte is Cùram Sòisealta

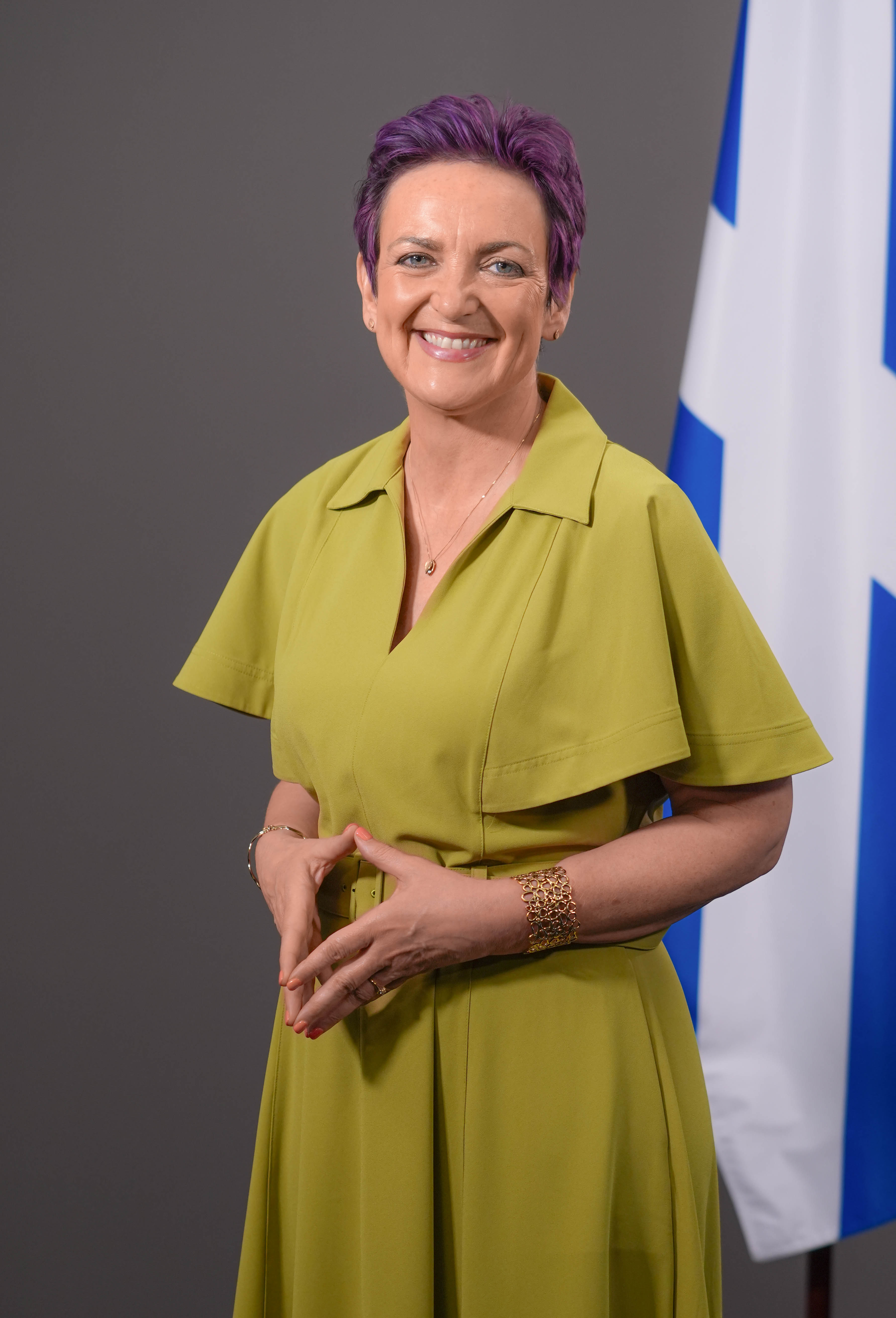
- Incumbent; Angela Constance since 20 May 2026
- Health and Social Care Directorates; NHS Scotland; Scottish Government; Scottish Cabinet
- Style: Cabinet Secretary (within parliament); Health Secretary (informal); Scottish Health Secretary (outwith Scotland)
- Member of: Scottish Parliament; Scottish Cabinet
- Reports to: Scottish Parliament; First Minister
- Seat: Edinburgh
- Appointer: First Minister (following approval from Scottish Parliament)
- Inaugural holder: Susan Deacon; Minister for Health and Community Care
- Formation: 19 May 1999
- Deputy: Minister for Public Health and Women's Health; Minister for Social Care and Mental Wellbeing; Minister for Drugs & Alcohol Policy and Sport
- Salary: £126,452 per annum (2024) (including £72,196 MSP salary)
- Website: www.gov.scot

The Cabinet Secretary for Health and Care,(Scottish Gaelic: Rùnaire a’ Chaibineit airson Slàinte is Cùram Sòisealta) commonly referred to as the Health Secretary (Scottish Gaelic: Rùnaire na Slàinte), is a cabinet position in the Scottish Government. The Cabinet Secretary is responsible for the Health and Social Care Directorates and NHS Scotland.

The current Cabinet Secretary is Angela Constance who has served since 8 February 2024. The Cabinet Secretary is assisted by the Minister for Public Health and Women's Health, Minister for Social Care and Mental Wellbeing and the Minister for Drugs & Alcohol Policy and Sport.

== History ==
The position was created in 1999 as the Minister for Health and Community Care, with the advent of devolution and the institution of the Scottish Parliament, taking over some of the roles and functions of the former Scottish Office that existed prior to 1999. After the 2007 election the Ministerial position was renamed to the Cabinet Secretary for Health and Wellbeing.

After the 2011 election the full Ministerial title was Cabinet Secretary for Health, Wellbeing and Cities Strategy with the portfolio being expanded to include Cities Strategy which was part of the SNP manifesto to have a dedicated "Minister for Cities"; at the same time the responsibility for housing was removed and transferred to the new Cabinet Secretary for Infrastructure and Capital Investment. Responsibilities for the cities strategy and the delivery of the 2014 Commonwealth Games in Glasgow were later transferred to other members of the cabinet.

After the 2016 election, the name of the post was changed to simply Cabinet Secretary for Health and Sport. In the 2021 cabinet reshuffle, the post was retitled to Cabinet Secretary for Health and Social Care.

First Minister Humza Yousaf retitled the role as Cabinet Secretary for NHS Recovery, Health and Social Care, appointing Michael Matheson in March 2023 then Neil Gray in February 2024. Upon the formation of the Swinney government, the post was reverted to its previous Cabinet Secretary for Health and Social Care title.

== Overview ==
=== Responsibilities ===
The responsibilities of the Cabinet Secretary for Health and Social Care include:

- acute services
- allied healthcare services
- centre of excellence for rural and remote medicine and social care
- community care
- eHealth
- health and social care integration
- health improvement and protection
- NHS estate
- NHS performance
- patient services and patient safety
- person-centred care
- primary care and GPs
- quality and improvement
- unscheduled care
- workforce, training, planning, and pay

=== Public bodies and Directorates ===
The following public bodies and directorates report to the Cabinet Secretary for Health and Social Care:

- NHS Scotland
- Care Inspectorate
- Healthcare Improvement Scotland
- Mental Welfare Commission for Scotland
- Scottish Social Services Council
- Sportscotland

Directorates

- Chief Medical Officer Directorate
- Chief Nursing Officer Directorate
- Chief Operating Officer, NHS Scotland Directorate
- Digital Health and Care Directorate
- Health Workforce Directorate
- Health and Social Care Finance, Digital and Governance Directorate
- Healthcare Quality and Improvement Directorate
- Mental Health Directorate
- Population Health Directorate
- Primary Care Directorate
- Social Care and National Care Service Development

== List of office holders ==
Name	Portrait	Entered office	Left office	Party	First Minister
Minister for Health and Community Care
Susan Deacon		19 May 1999	28 November 2001	Scottish Labour	Donald Dewar; Henry McLeish
Malcolm Chisholm		28 November 2001	6 October 2004	Scottish Labour	Jack McConnell
Andy Kerr		6 October 2004	17 May 2007	Scottish Labour	Jack McConnell
Cabinet Secretary for Health and Wellbeing
Nicola Sturgeon		17 May 2007	19 May 2011	Scottish National Party	Alex Salmond
Cabinet Secretary for Health, Wellbeing and Cities Strategy
Nicola Sturgeon		19 May 2011	5 September 2012	Scottish National Party	Alex Salmond
Cabinet Secretary for Health and Wellbeing
Alex Neil		5 September 2012	21 November 2014	Scottish National Party	Alex Salmond
Cabinet Secretary for Health, Wellbeing and Sport
Shona Robison		21 November 2014	18 May 2016	Scottish National Party	Nicola Sturgeon
Cabinet Secretary for Health and Sport
Shona Robison		18 May 2016	26 June 2018	Scottish National Party	Nicola Sturgeon
Jeane Freeman		26 June 2018	19 May 2021	Scottish National Party	Nicola Sturgeon
Cabinet Secretary for Health and Social Care
Humza Yousaf		19 May 2021	28 March 2023	Scottish National Party	Nicola Sturgeon
Cabinet Secretary for NHS Recovery, Health and Social Care
Michael Matheson		29 March 2023	8 February 2024	Scottish National Party	Humza Yousaf
Neil Gray		8 February 2024	8 May 2024	Scottish National Party	Humza Yousaf
Cabinet Secretary for Health and Social Care
Neil Gray		8 May 2024	20 May 2026	Scottish National Party	John Swinney
Cabinet Secretary for Health and Care
Angela Constance		20 May 2026	Incumbent	Scottish National Party	John Swinney
