= Tom Arthur (Scottish politician) =

Scottish National Party politician

Tom Arthur MSP
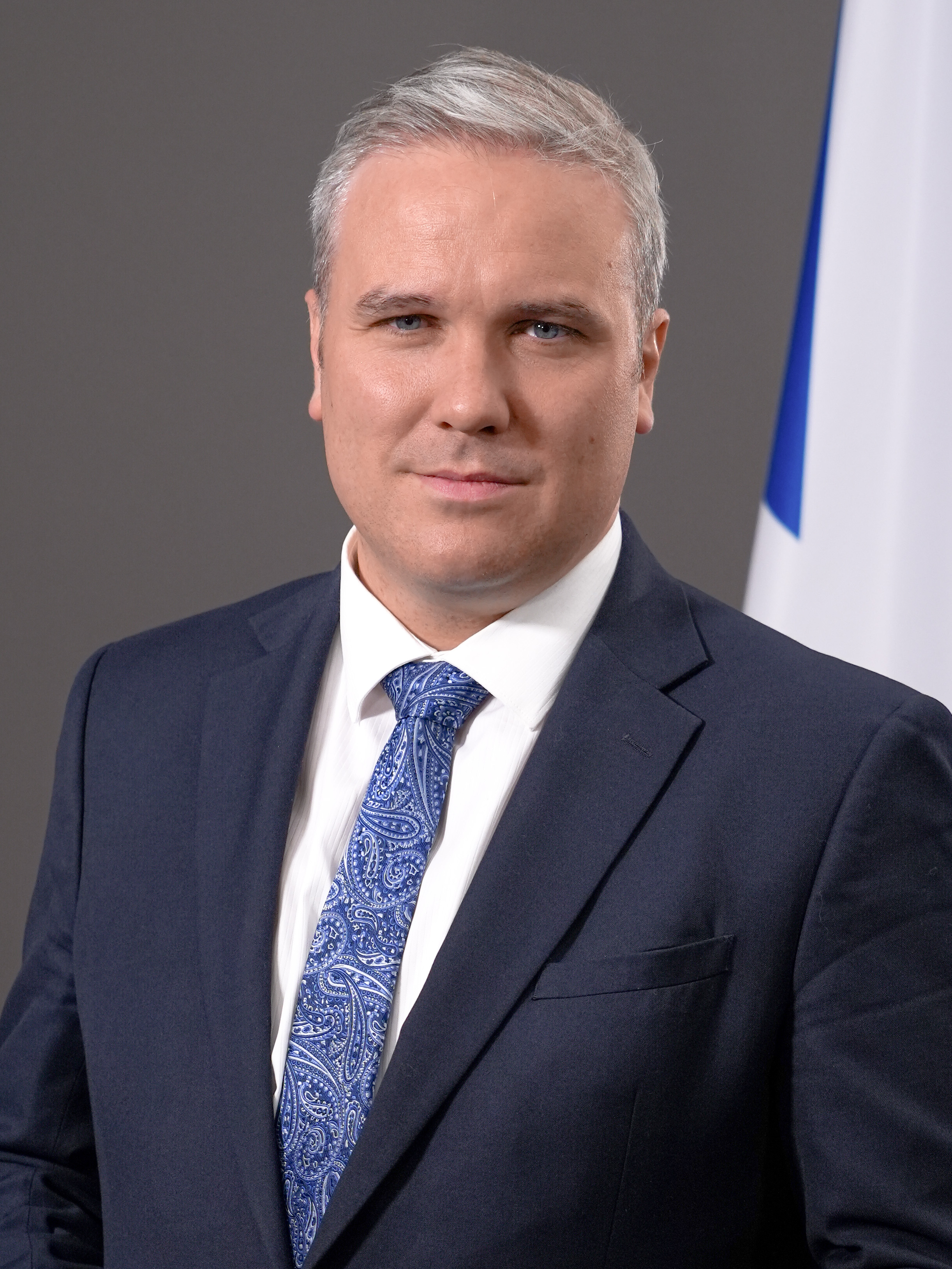
- Official portrait, 2026

Minister for Employment and Fair Work (Note: Known as Minister for Employment and Investment until 11 June 2025.)
- Incumbent
- Assumed office 20 May 2026
- First Minister: John Swinney
- Preceded by: Richard Lochhead
- In office 8 May 2024 – 11 June 2025
- First Minister: John Swinney
- Preceded by: Richard Lochhead (2023)
- Succeeded by: Richard Lochhead

Minister for Social Care and Mental Wellbeing
- In office 11 June 2025 – 20 May 2026
- First Minister: John Swinney
- Preceded by: Maree Todd
- Succeeded by: Alison Thewliss

Minister for Community Wealth and Public Finance (Note: Known as Minister for Public Finance, Planning and Community Wealth until 29 March 2023.)
- In office 20 May 2021 – 8 May 2024
- First Minister: Nicola Sturgeon; Humza Yousaf
- Preceded by: Ben Macpherson
- Succeeded by: Ivan McKee

Member of the Scottish Parliament for Renfrewshire West and Levern Valley Renfrewshire South (2016–2026)
- Incumbent
- Assumed office 5 May 2016
- Preceded by: Hugh Henry
- Majority: 3,271 (9.6%)

Personal details
- Born: 1985 (age 40–41) Paisley, Renfrewshire, Scotland
- Party: Scottish National Party
- Education: University of Glasgow
- Website: www.tomarthur.scot

Thomas Compton Arthur (born 1985) is a Scottish National Party (SNP) politician who has served as Minister for Employment and Fair Work since May 2026. He has been the Member of the Scottish Parliament (MSP) for the constituency of Renfrewshire West and Levern Valley since the 2026 election. He was previously MSP for the abolished seat of Renfrewshire South, having been first elected in 2016 and re-elected in 2021.

He has served various roles under Nicola Sturgeon, Humza Yousaf, and John Swinney, including as Minister for Community Wealth and Public Finance, Minister for Employment and Investment, and Minister for Social Care and Mental Wellbeing until the May 2026 election.

== Background ==
Arthur was born in 1985 in Paisley, Renfrewshire and raised in Barrhead, East Renfrewshire, where he was educated at Cross Arthurlie Primary and Barrhead High School. He graduated with a Bachelor of Music then later Master of Music from the University of Glasgow. Before entering politics, he worked as a company director, freelance piano teacher and keyboardist.

== Political career ==
Arthur joined the Scottish National Party in 2009. He was elected as the first SNP Member of the Scottish Parliament (MSP) for the Renfrewshire South constituency at the 2016 Scottish Parliament election, gaining the seat from the Scottish Labour Party with 48.1% of the vote and a majority of 4,408 or 14.9%. He made his maiden speech in the Scottish Parliament on 26 May 2016. He was re-elected in the 2021 Scottish Parliament election with a 50.5% vote share in the constituency and gained an increased majority of 7,106 votes or 20.5% over the nearest challenger.

In May 2021 he was appointed Minister for Public Finance, Planning and Community Wealth in the Scottish Government. In March 2023, Humza Yousaf re-appointed him to his ministerial role as Minister for Community Wealth and Public Finance. Between May 2024 and June 2025, he served as Minister for Employment and Investment under John Swinney. In June 2025, he was appointed Minister for Social Care and Mental Wellbeing, the first time Arthur served in a non-economic role.

From the 2026 election, Arthur's constituency of Renfrewshire South was abolished. He was selected as the SNP candidate for the new constituency of Renfrewshire West and Levern Valley and was successfully elected with 13,819 votes, a majority of 3,271 or 9.6%.

Following the May 2026 election, Arthur was appointed as Minister for Employment and Fair Work.

Scottish Parliament
Preceded by Hugh Henry	Member of the Scottish Parliament for Renfrewshire South; 2016–present	Incumbent
