= Richard Lochhead =

Scottish Business and Employment Minister

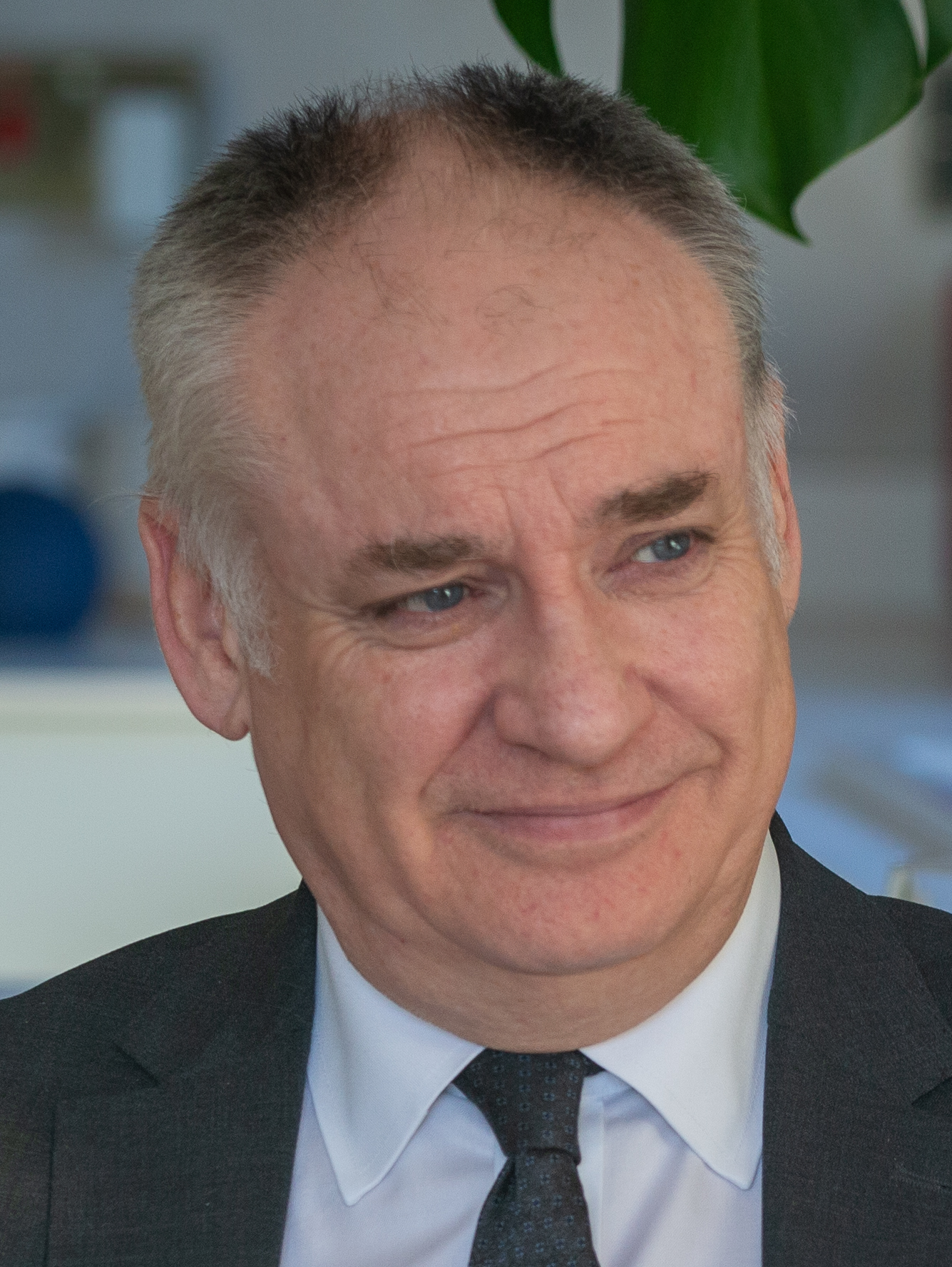
- Lochhead in 2025

Minister for Business and Employment (Note: As Minister for Small Business, Innovation and Trade from 29 March 2023 to 8 May 2024; and as Minister for Business from 8 May 2024 to 11 June 2025)
- In office 29 March 2023 – 20 May 2026
- First Minister: Humza Yousaf; John Swinney
- Preceded by: Ivan McKee
- Succeeded by: Tom Arthur

Minister for Just Transition, Employment and Fair Work
- In office 20 May 2021 – 29 March 2023
- First Minister: Nicola Sturgeon
- Preceded by: Office established
- Succeeded by: Tom Arthur (2024)

Minister for Further Education, Higher Education and Science
- In office 4 September 2018 – 20 May 2021
- First Minister: Nicola Sturgeon
- Preceded by: Shirley-Anne Somerville
- Succeeded by: Jamie Hepburn

Cabinet Secretary for Rural Affairs, Food and Environment
- In office 17 May 2007 – 18 May 2016
- First Minister: Alex Salmond; Nicola Sturgeon
- Preceded by: Ross Finnie
- Succeeded by: Fergus Ewing

Member of the Scottish Parliament for Moray
- In office 27 April 2006 – 9 April 2026
- Preceded by: Margaret Ewing
- Succeeded by: Laura Mitchell

Member of Parliament for North East Scotland
- In office 6 May 1999 – 19 April 2006
- Preceded by: New parliament
- Succeeded by: Maureen Watt

Personal details
- Born: Richard Neilson Lochhead; 24 May 1969 (age 57) Paisley, Renfrewshire, Scotland
- Party: Scottish National Party
- Spouse: Fiona Lochhead
- Children: 2
- Education: University of Stirling
- Occupation: Office manager; Economic development officer
- Website: www.richardlochhead.org

Richard Neilson Lochhead (born 24 May 1969) is a Scottish politician and former Scottish Government minister. A member of the Scottish National Party (SNP) he served as the Minister for Business and Employment between 2023 and 2026, Cabinet Secretary for Rural Affairs, Food and Environment from 2007 to 2016, and a number of other junior ministerial posts.

Lochhead served as a member of the Scottish Parliament (MSP) from 1999 to 2026, first representing North East Scotland electoral region from 1999 to 2006, before representing the Moray constituency from 2006 to 2026.

== Early life ==
Richard Neilson Lochhead was born in Paisley on 24 May 1969. He attended Williamwood High School in Clarkston and Central College of Commerce in Glasgow before he graduated in 1994 in Political Studies from the University of Stirling. He worked for the SNP leader, Alex Salmond, as his Office Manager from 1994 to 1998, before becoming an environmental development officer for Dundee City Council. He was the SNP candidate in Gordon in the 1997 UK General Election, where he finished third. He fought the Aberdeen Central constituency in both 1999 and 2003, but came second to Lewis Macdonald each time.

== Political career ==
=== SNP in opposition; 1999 to 2007 ===
Lochhead was elected to the Scottish Parliament at the 1999 election and re-elected at the 2003 election for the North East Scotland Region. In January 2006 he was selected as the SNP candidate for Moray for the 2007 Scottish Parliament elections, following the announcement that Margaret Ewing MSP would be retiring. He beat Margaret Ewing's sister-in-law, former MP Annabelle Ewing in the selection. Ewing's premature death triggered a by-election and Lochhead resigned his additional member seat in April 2006 in order to successfully contest the Moray by-election. He was elected on 28 April 2006. This was the first time since the Second World War that an incumbent party had retained a by-election seat without losing votes or having their majority or share of the vote lowered.

He was convener of the European and External Relations Committee of the Scottish Parliament 11 June 2003 – 14 September 2004. In opposition he held the SNP's portfolios on Environment, Energy, Fishing and Rural Affairs in the Scottish Parliament.

=== Rural Affairs Secretary; 2007 to 2016 ===
After the SNP's victory at the 2007 Scottish Parliament Election, it was announced on 16 May 2007 that Lochhead would be the Cabinet Secretary for Rural Affairs and Environment, taking up the position the following day. The junior Ministerial position of Minister for the Environment was initially given to Michael Russell (currently held by Aileen McLeod). In May 2007, Lochhead started his tenure with promises to "relentlessly" pursue the Scottish fishing interests on behalf of fishermen and their communities.

Lochhead was re-elected at the 2011 election with a further increased majority of 10,944. He announced his resignation as Environment Secretary, effective on 18 May 2016, as Nicola Sturgeon put together her reshuffle to appoint the second Sturgeon government.

=== Return to government; 2018 to present ===
On 31 August 2018 he was announced as Minister for Further Education, Higher Education and Science.

He retained his seat at the 2021 Scottish Parliament election, with an increased majority, number of votes and percentage of votes cast. After the election, he was appointed as Minister for Just Transition, Employment and Fair Work.

In 2023, he was appointed as Business Minister by the new First Minister Humza Yousaf and has held the role, under various titles, since.

Lochhead announced on 26 January 2025 that he would not seek re-election in 2026.

== Personal life ==
Richard Lochhead is married to Fiona, and they have two children together.

He is a supporter of Aberdeen F.C.

Given that he won the 2006 Moray by-election and was elected at every Scottish Parliament general election since its establishment, Lochhead was the MSP who had been elected to the parliament the highest number of times prior to his retirement in 2026.

In 2024, Lochhead spent six weeks in hospital and had to learn how to walk again after becoming seriously ill with sepsis.

== Notes ==
Scottish Parliament
New parliament Scotland Act 1998	Member of the Scottish Parliament for North East Scotland; 1999–2006	Succeeded by Maureen Watt
Preceded by Margaret Ewing	Member of the Scottish Parliament for Moray; 2006–2026	Succeeded by Laura Mitchell
Political offices
Preceded by Ross Finnie (as Minister for the Environment and Rural Development)	Cabinet Secretary for Rural Affairs and the Environment; 2007–2016	Succeeded by Roseanna Cunningham
