= Jamie Hepburn =

Scottish politician (born 1979)

Jamie Hepburn MSP
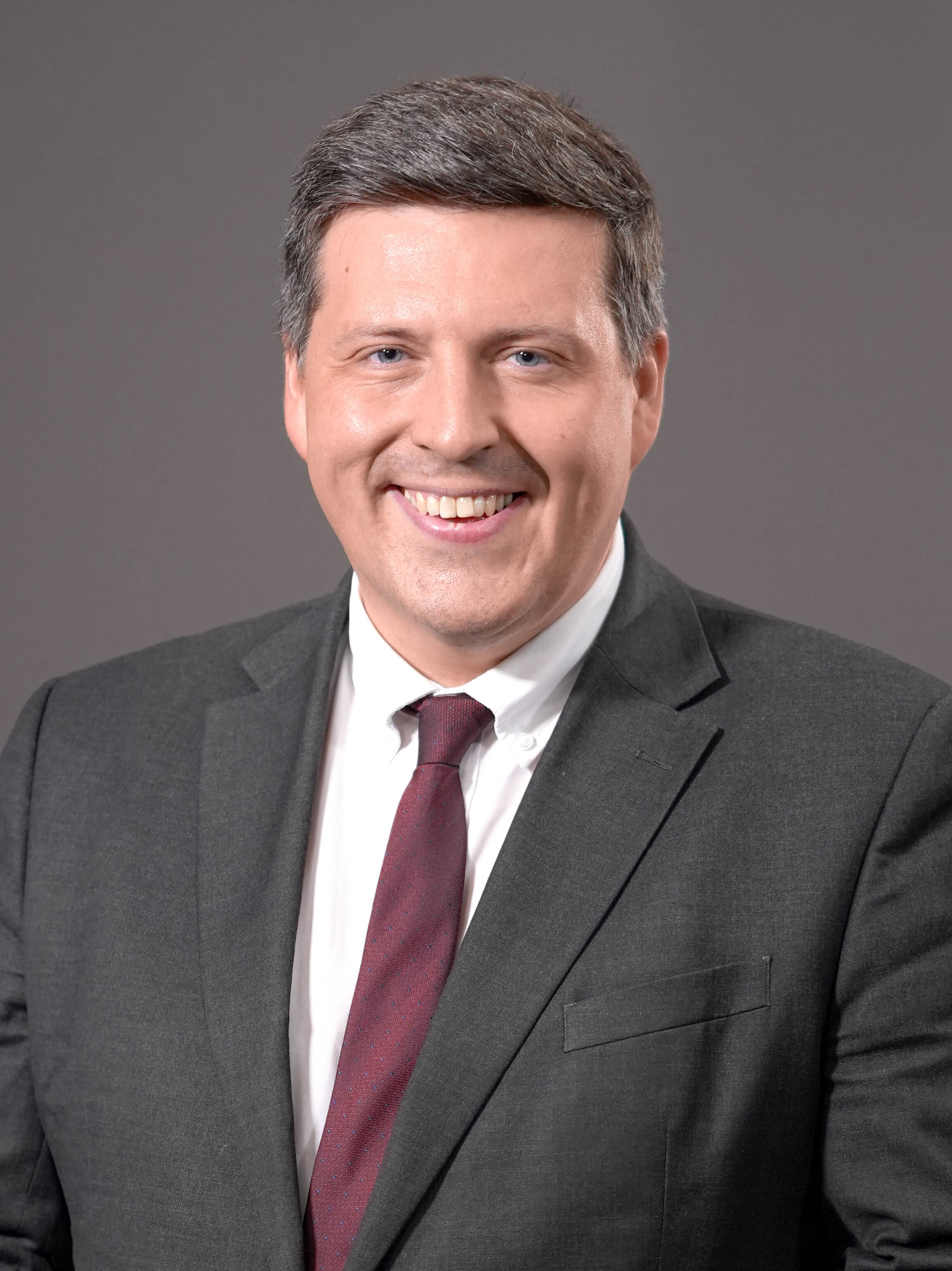
- Official portrait, 2026

Minister for Parliamentary Business & Veterans (Note: The post was titled Minister for Parliamentary Business from 2024 to 2025)
- Incumbent
- Assumed office 21 May 2026
- First Minister: John Swinney
- Preceded by: Graeme Dey
- In office 8 May 2024 – 19 September 2025
- First Minister: John Swinney
- Preceded by: George Adam
- Succeeded by: Graeme Dey

Minister for Independence
- In office 29 March 2023 – 8 May 2024
- First Minister: Humza Yousaf
- Preceded by: Office established
- Succeeded by: Office abolished

Minister for Higher Education and Further Education, Youth Employment and Training
- In office 20 May 2021 – 29 March 2023
- First Minister: Nicola Sturgeon
- Preceded by: Richard Lochhead
- Succeeded by: Graeme Dey

Minister for Business, Fair Work and Skills
- In office 26 June 2018 – 20 May 2021
- First Minister: Nicola Sturgeon
- Preceded by: Paul Wheelhouse
- Succeeded by: Ivan McKee

Minister for Employability and Training
- In office 18 May 2016 – 26 June 2018
- First Minister: Nicola Sturgeon
- Preceded by: Annabelle Ewing
- Succeeded by: Office abolished

Minister for Sport, Health Improvement and Mental Health
- In office 21 November 2014 – 18 May 2016
- First Minister: Nicola Sturgeon
- Preceded by: Office established
- Succeeded by: Maureen Watt

Member of the Scottish Parliament for Cumbernauld and Kilsyth
- Incumbent
- Assumed office 5 May 2011
- Preceded by: Cathie Craigie
- Majority: 7,315 (26.9%)

Member of the Scottish Parliament for Central Scotland (1 of 7 Regional MSPs)
- In office 3 May 2007 – 22 March 2011

Personal details
- Born: James Douglas Hepburn; 21 May 1979 (age 47) Glasgow, Scotland
- Party: Scottish National Party
- Spouse: Julie Hepburn
- Education: University of Glasgow
- Website: www.jamiehepburn.net

James Douglas Hepburn (born 21 May 1979) is a Scottish politician. A member of the Scottish National Party (SNP), he has been Member of the Scottish Parliament (MSP) for Cumbernauld and Kilsyth since 2011, having previously represented the Central Scotland region from 2007 to 2011.

Hepburn has served in numerous roles within the Scottish Government, first as Minister for Sport, Health Improvement and Mental Health from 2014 to 2016, then as Minister for Employability and Training from 2016 to 2018, as Minister for Business, Fair Work and Skills from 2018 to 2021, and then as Minister for Independence from 2023 to 2024. Most recently, Hepburn served as the Minister for Parliamentary Business & Veterans between May 2024 and September 2025 and returned to the role after the 2026 Scottish Parliament election.

== Early life ==
Born in Glasgow, Hepburn was educated at Hyndland Secondary School and graduated from the University of Glasgow with a Politics and History degree. Whilst a student, Hepburn ran the unsuccessful campaign for Alasdair Gray to become the Rector of the University of Glasgow and was the Senior Vice-President at the Glasgow University Students' Representative Council, a post once held by his SNP Parliamentary colleague Alasdair Allan.

== Career ==
Before his election, Hepburn was convener of the Federation of Student Nationalists and the Young Scots for Independence. He had been the SNP candidate for the Cumbernauld, Kilsyth and Kirkintilloch East constituency at the 2005 general election. He has worked for Alex Neil, a fellow SNP MSP.

Hepburn was elected during the 2007 election for the Central Scotland region, having also contested the Cumbernauld and Kilsyth seat at that election, finishing second behind Cathie Craigie. In this election he was one of only two candidates to win more than 40% in the constituency contested and not win the seat, the other being Alasdair Morrison in the Western Isles. He was the second youngest elected member of the Scottish Parliament for the 2007–2011 session after his SNP colleague Aileen Campbell.

Hepburn was a member of the Scottish Parliament Rural Affairs and Environment Committee and a substitute member of the Equal Opportunities Committee until 26 June 2008 when he became a member of the European and External Relations Committee, and a substitute to the Rural Affairs and Environment Committee, before being switched to a substitute member of the Public Petitions Committee. He subsequently was moved to the Public Audit and Equal Opportunities Committees towards the latter part of the third session of the Scottish Parliament. He is now the Deputy Convener of the Infrastructure and Capital Investment Committee. Hepburn also served as the convener of the Cross Party Group on Human Rights and Civil Liberties in the Scottish Parliament's third session.

He was placed third on the SNP list for Central Scotland for the 2011 Scottish Parliament election but was returned for the Cumbernauld and Kilsyth constituency. On 21 November 2014, it was announced that he would be Minister for Sport and Health Improvement. On 18 May he was moved to the post of Minister for Employability and Training.

It was Hepburn's written question which revealed that projects in Scotland funded by the Private Finance Initiative will cost the taxpayer some £22.3 billion over a 40-year period.

He was one of six SNP MSPs to attend the "Big Blockade" event at the Faslane naval base organised by Faslane 365 on 1 October 2007 and has been active in calling for greater transparency about allegations that American government agencies facilitated extraordinary rendition flights through Scottish airports. He has also called for any Scottish airport that is being sold by BAA Limited to be brought under public control.

Hepburn has signed up to the People's Charter, a campaigning document prepared by trade unionists as an alternative to neoliberalism and has drawn criticism from some elements of the Scottish media for having tabled a motion on Venezuela.

In September 2025, he resigned as a minister after an alleged assault on Douglas Ross MSP, former Leader of the Scottish Conservative and Unionist Party.

== Personal life ==
Hepburn lives in Cumbernauld and with his wife Julie Hepburn, who was the SNP candidate for Cumbernauld, Kilsyth and Kirkintilloch East at the 2010 UK general election. She finished in second place to Labour with 9,794 votes.

== Notes ==
Scottish Parliament
Preceded by Cathie Craigie	Member of the Scottish Parliament for Cumbernauld and Kilsyth; 2011–present	Incumbent
