= Second Swinney government =

Scottish Government since 2026

- 13th Government of Scotland
- 2026–present
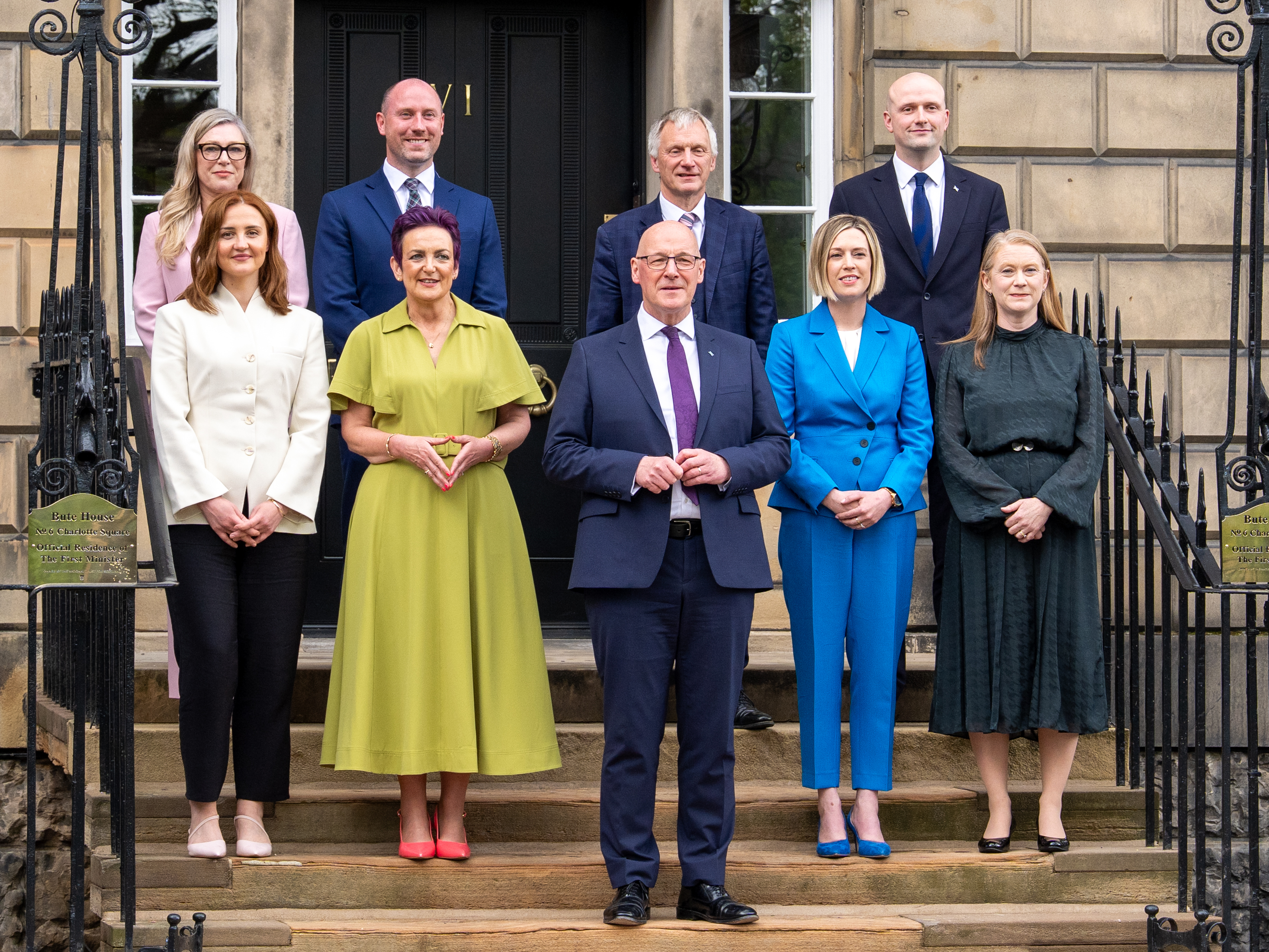
- Swinney's cabinet outside Bute House, 2026
- Date formed: 20 May 2026

People and organisations
- Head of state: Charles III
- First Minister: John Swinney
- First Minister's history: MSP for Perthshire North (1999–present); Deputy First Minister of Scotland (2014–2023); Cabinet Secretary for Finance and the Economy (2007–2016, 2022–2023); Cabinet Secretary for Covid Recovery (2021–2023); Cabinet Secretary for Education and Skills (2016–2021)
- Deputy First Minister: Jenny Gilruth
- Member party: Scottish National Party
- Status in legislature: Minority
- Opposition cabinet: Opposition Parties
- Opposition parties: Scottish Labour
- Opposition leaders: Anas Sarwar & Malcolm Offord (2026); Jackie Baillie & Malcolm Offord (2026); Michael Marra & Malcolm Offord (2026); Michael Marra (2026–present)

History
- Election: 2026 Scottish Parliament election
- Legislature term: 7th Scottish Parliament
- Predecessor: First Swinney government

John Swinney formed the second Swinney government on 20 May 2026, following his reappointment as First Minister of Scotland after the 2026 Scottish Parliament election.

The government was announced on 20 May 2026 following Swinney's formal swearing-in at the Court of Session. The new government featured a significantly streamlined cabinet, reduced from twelve cabinet secretaries to nine, with Swinney stating that the government would focus on "fiscal sustainability" and public sector reform.

Jenny Gilruth was appointed Deputy First Minister and Cabinet Secretary for Finance and Local Government, replacing Kate Forbes, who departed government following the election. Former Westminster SNP leader Stephen Flynn entered government for the first time as Cabinet Secretary for Economy, Tourism and Transport. Several senior cabinet secretaries from the first Swinney government did not return for the second government, with former Deputy First Minister Kate Forbes, Finance Secretary Shona Robison, Transport Secretary Fiona Hyslop and Rural Affairs Secretary Mairi Gougeon all standing down ahead of the 2026 election, while Constitution Secretary Angus Robertson lost his seat in Edinburgh Central.

Several appointments were initially made on a designate basis pending approval by the Scottish Parliament and formal appointment by the monarch, including Ivan McKee, Stephen Flynn, Stephen Gethins, Hannah Mary Goodlad, Kirsten Oswald, Alison Thewliss and Simita Kumar.

== Cabinet ==
Portfolio	Portrait	Minister	Term
First Minister		The Rt Hon John Swinney MSP	8 May 2024–present
Cabinet secretaries
Deputy First Minister		Jenny Gilruth MSP	20 May 2026–present
Cabinet Secretary for Finance and Local Government		Jenny Gilruth MSP	20 May 2026–present
Cabinet Secretary for Health and Care		Angela Constance MSP	20 May 2026–present
Cabinet Secretary for Economy, Transport and Tourism		The Rt Hon Stephen Flynn MSP	20 May 2026–present
Cabinet Secretary for Climate Action and Rural Affairs		Gillian Martin MSP	11 July 2025–present
Cabinet Secretary for Education, Culture and Gaelic		Màiri McAllan MSP	20 May 2026–present
Cabinet Secretary for Public Service Reform		Ivan McKee MSP	20 May 2026–present
Cabinet Secretary for Social Justice and Housing		Shirley-Anne Somerville MSP	20 May 2026–present
Cabinet Secretary for Justice		Neil Gray MSP	20 May 2026–present
Also attending cabinet meetings
Permanent Secretary		Joe Griffin	7 April 2025–present
Minister for Parliamentary Business & Veterans		Jamie Hepburn	20 May 2026–present
Lord Advocate		The Rt Hon. Ruth Charteris KC	19 June 2026–present

== List of Junior Ministers ==
Junior ministers
Post	Minister	Term
Minister for Parliamentary Business & Veterans	Jamie Hepburn MSP	2026–present
Minister for Europe, External Affairs and Energy	Stephen Gethins MSP	2026–present
Minister for Public Finance	Hannah Mary Goodlad MSP	2026–present
Minister for Victims and Community Safety	Kirsten Oswald MSP	2026–present
Minister for Community Care	Alison Thewliss MSP	2026–present
Minister for Mental Wellbeing, Public Health, Sport, Alcohol & Drugs	Maree Todd MSP	2025–present
Minister for Agriculture, Marine and the Islands	Jim Fairlie MSP	2024–present
Minister for Children, Young People and the Promise	Siobhian Brown MSP	2026–present
Minister for Innovation, Technology and Tertiary Education	Ben Macpherson MSP	2025–2026
Minister for Innovation, Technology and Tertiary Education	Alyn Smith MSP	2026–present
Minister for Equalities and International Development	Simita Kumar MSP	2026–present
Minister for Business and Fair Work	Tom Arthur MSP	2026–present
