= Swinney government =

Swinney government may refer to

- First Swinney government, the Scottish Government led by John Swinney from 2024 to 2026
- Second Swinney government, the Scottish Government led by John Swinney since 2026
