= Benny Higgins =

Scottish banker (born 1960)

Benny Higgins FRSE
- Born: Bernard Franklin Higgins; 12 December 1960 (age 65); Glasgow, Scotland
- Education: Glasgow University
- Occupation: Banker
- Employer(s): Chairman of Markerstudy Group and Buccleuch Group
- Known for: Former Chief exec RBS NatWest Retail Banking, Former CEO Tesco Bank, Former Chairman National Galleries of Scotland, Group Chairman Markerstudy Group, Executive Chairman Buccleuch Group, Chairman Edinburgh Fringe

Benny Higgins FRSE (born 12 December 1960) is a Scottish banker, is the former chief executive officer (CEO) of Tesco Bank and is the chairman of the Edinburgh Fringe.

== Early life ==
He was brought up in Prospecthill Circus in Toryglen, Glasgow, Scotland. He attended Holyrood Secondary School in the city.

== Career ==
After achieving a degree in mathematics at The University of Glasgow, Higgins began his career in 1983 at Standard Life in Edinburgh, qualifying as an actuary and then becoming an investment manager.

Higgins left in 1997 for the Royal Bank of Scotland, where he became chief executive of Retail Banking and was involved in setting up Tesco Personal Finance. He was part of the team (alongside Fred Goodwin and George Mathewson) that acquired and integrated NatWest in 2000. At the time of his departure from RBS at the end of 2005 he was chief executive of the Retail Bank which covered both the RBS and NatWest brands.

In January 2006, he took the helm of the Retail Business at HBOS. However, he departed at the end of 2007. During his tenure, Higgins' conservative mortgage strategy led to a fall in the share of the market for new mortgage lending from 16 per cent to 8 per cent, although on announcing Higgins' resignation Hornby explicitly denied any link. Analysts were less kind at the time. "Benny Higgins is carrying the can ... for the mortgage debacle in the first half of this year," one said. "He was supposed to be the next big thing for HBOS, coming in from RBS to shake up the HBOS business. Obviously he's been given his marching orders.". In the aftermath of the financial crisis, Higgins was singled out amongst the executives at HBOS for his decision-making with the Financial Times commenting that "MPs must question if homes plan passes the Higgins' test".

After a short sabbatical, Higgins returned to banking, taking the position of CEO of Tesco Personal Finance, later renamed to Tesco Bank, following Tesco's buy out of RBS's share of their 50:50 joint venture on 28 July 2008. In 2009, he launched Putting Tesco into Banking and Insurance, a book setting out his vision for Tesco "to become a natural provider of financial services for Tesco Customers". Under his leadership, Tesco Bank expanded to serve more than 8m customers across banking and insurance and employing 5000 people across the UK.

Higgins was also Chief Strategy Director of Tesco Group and the Group's lead sponsor of LGBTQ+, which was the biggest corporate group in Europe.

As of 2017, he was chairman of the Regulatory Technology company Kyckr.

In September 2017, First Minister Nicola Sturgeon announced that Higgins would assist the Scottish Government in establishing a Scottish National Investment Bank for Scottish infrastructure investment. Higgins made 21 recommendations to the Scottish Government, all of which were accepted. First Minister Sturgeon welcomed and endorsed his report, describing the plans as “truly transformational” and on a “different scale” from earlier government initiatives.

In 2019 he became chairman of the Duke of Buccleuch's estates company, managing the extensive portfolio of property and land owned by the family. Under his chairmanship, Higgins has led efforts to sell land back to local communities

In 2021 Higgins became chairman of the personal lines insurance group, Markerstudy Group, owned by the private capital company Pollen Street.

== Honours and awards ==
In 2018, he was elected a Fellow of the Royal Society of Edinburgh (FRSE).

In 2018, he was awarded "Corporate Straight Ally of the Year" by the LGBTQ+ Awards in recognition of his role leading Tesco global LGBTQ network.

Higgins has been awarded honorary doctorates and visiting professorships at the University of Edinburgh, University of Glasgow, Heriot-Watt University and Strathclyde University.

== Other interests ==
Higgins was a keen footballer and played for Glasgow Celtic, captaining the youth team in the late 1970s.

In 2017, he took on an unpaid role as chairman of the National Galleries of Scotland and led the organisation through significant change over eight years, including the opening of the Scottish Gallery's new wing after major renovation and culminating in the appointment of the first female Director General,

In 2018, Higgins accepted a similar position at Sistema Scotland, a children's orchestra charity (succeeding Richard Holloway).

In 2021, Higgins became the chairman of the Edinburgh Fringe.

At an HBOS investor annual results event, Peter Cummings, his then corporate counterpart, told analysts he felt "very, very optimistic" about the future. Higgins followed up by relating the story of Pollyanna, the over-optimistic girl who ended up falling out of a tree.

== Personal life ==
Higgins has been married five times. He has six children and two stepdaughters.
