= Scottish National Investment Bank Act 2020 =

- Act of the Scottish Parliament
- Scottish Parliament
- Long title: An Act of the Scottish Parliament to require the establishment of the Scottish National Investment Bank and to make further provision in connection with that body.
- Citation: 2020 asp 3
- Introduced by: Derek Mackay MSP
- Territorial extent: Scotland

Dates
- Royal assent: 25 February 2020
- Commencement: 16 September 2020

Status: Current legislation

Text of statute as originally enacted

Text of the Scottish National Investment Bank Act 2020 as in force today (including any amendments) within the United Kingdom, from legislation.gov.uk.

The Scottish National Investment Bank Act 2020 (asp 3) is an act of the Scottish Parliament which was passed by Parliament on 21 January 2020. The Act legally obliges Scottish Ministers to establish a Scottish National Investment Bank as both a public body and a publicly limited company. The bank is to be independent of the Scottish Government. "Its primary goal is to help Scotland transition to net-zero carbon emissions, while supporting small and medium-size enterprises."

The bill was introduced by Cabinet Secretary for Finance, Derek Mackay MSP.

The lead scrutinising committee was the Finance and Constitution Committee.

The bill received royal assent on 25 February 2020, becoming an act of the Scottish Parliament.

The Scottish National Investment Bank was formally launched in November 2020.
