= Sustainable Growth Commission =

Scottish economic commission

The Sustainable Growth Commission was a Scottish economic commission, founded in 2016 by First Minister Nicola Sturgeon to make recommendations to the Scottish Government on currency and economic policy in an independent Scotland. The Sustainable Growth Commission represents the first major work produced by the SNP on the topic of economy, currency and independence since the 2014 "Scotland's Future" White Paper. In 2018 it published a report on the economy and finances of an independent Scotland, making 50 recommendations. The commission's chairman was economist and former SNP MSP Andrew Wilson.

== Background ==
The Sustainable Growth Commission was set up by Nicola Sturgeon in September 2016 after Britain voted to leave the EU, as part of a "new conversation" on Scottish independence. Its remit was to investigate projections about Scotland's economy and public finances, and investigate how they would change if Scotland became an independent country. It made recommendations on how to improve Scotland's finances (both in the aftermath of the 2016 EU referendum and in relation to Scottish independence), how Scotland would transition to a new currency, and assessed how savings that could be made post-independence such as withdrawing the Trident nuclear missile system.

== Members ==
The committee included politicians, academics and businesspeople. The 12 members at the time of the 2018 report were:

- Marie Burns, Shadow Economy and Communities spokesperson, North Ayrshire Council
- Iain Docherty, Professor of Public Policy and Governance, University of Glasgow
- Kate Forbes, MSP for Skye, Lochaber and Badenoch
- Andrew Hughes Hallett, Professor of Economics and Public Policy, George Mason University and University of St Andrews
- Dan McDonald, businessman and founder of the N-56 pressure group
- Derek Mackay MSP, Scottish Government Cabinet Secretary for Finance
- Marie Macklin, Founder and Chief Executive of the Klin Group and Macklin Enterprise Partnership
- Jim Mather, former Enterprise Minister and Visiting Professor at the University of Strathclyde and Heriot Watt University
- Roger Mullin, Honorary Professor at University of Stirling Management School, former Member of Parliament and SNP Westminster Finance spokesperson.
- Catherine Schenk, Professor of Economic and Social History, University of Oxford
- Mark Shaw, Chief Executive, Hazeldene Group
- Shirley-Anne Somerville, Minister for Further Education, Higher Education and Science
- Petra Wetzel, founder and Managing Director WEST Brewery
- Andrew Wilson (Chair), Founding Partner, Charlotte St Partners and former SNP MSP for Central Scotland

The commission's budget was paid for in full by the SNP, but members attended pro bono.

== 2018 report ==
The SNP published the Commission's report in May 2018. It set out in detail the approach that the Scottish Government should take in relation to fiscal policy after independence, and modelled some likely outcomes. It studied the economies of similarly-sized countries including New Zealand, Denmark and Finland, arguing that smaller countries have outperformed larger ones economically over the previous 25 years.

The 354-page report recommended that Scotland should keep the pound sterling (known as "Sterlingisation") until six stringent tests were met (including fiscal sustainability, a stable central bank and sufficiency of foreign exchange reserves), and that after a decade these targets will have been met and a separate Scottish currency could be established. It also predicted that Scotland's deficit would be around 6% directly after independence, but wouldn't be under control for 10 years. This would be done by capping public spending increases at 1% below the level of GDP growth. The report gave an independent Scotland a 25 year time horizon to reach "a target per capita income position" and match the economic performance of other small nations, but that it would start to converge with these peers in the first 10 years, and catch up in years 10-25. Although Scotland would start without any debt it would pay a £5 billion "Annual Solidarity Payment" to the UK treasury to honour historic commitments to the UK national debt, with a further £1 billion per year for shared services. The report calculated the cost of setting up an independent Scotland at £450 million.

== Reception and aftermath ==
Nicola Sturgeon hoped the report would encourage support of independence by showing an alternative to Westminster austerity and the "Brexit spiral". A YouGov survey in June 2018 reported a marginal increase in support for independence with 13% of respondents more likely to support independence against 6% who were less likely to. She hoped the report would also settle the question of which currency an independent Scotland would use, which was considered the "Achilles' heel" of the SNP's 2014 Scottish independence referendum campaign. The SNP launched a series of "National Assemblies" in summer 2018 in Ayr, Aviemore and Edinburgh, specifically to discuss and debate the findings of the report with a view to coming to a consensus. There were mixed reactions from SNP members, and some disapproval within the SNP when the report was not debated at the party’s 2018 conference. Alex Neil, an SNP MSP and former government minister, said that he believed the issue should be debated to show that the party was not afraid of public scrutiny.

There was criticism from opposition politicians, including Scottish Conservatives leader Ruth Davidson and Scottish Labour leader Richard Leonard (with the latter branding the Growth Commission as the "cuts commission", referring to the budget cuts that the report deemed necessary to lower the deficit), as well as some independence campaigners who were anxious that capping public expenditure and keeping the pound could damage the case for an independent Scotland. George Kerevan, a former SNP MSP, worried the six tests could leave Scotland using the pound indefinitely and result in cuts to services and spending. He said "Sterlingisation and the six tests would effectively negate the very point of seeking independence for Scotland".

The Common Weal, a pro-independence think tank criticised the Annual Solidarity Payment saying that Scotland should not be reliant on "buying in" services from the United Kingdom. These Islands, a pro-union campaign group, disputed the claim that an independent Scotland could be set up for £450 million as "patently unrealistic", pointing out that the Scottish Government had recently spent £178 million on an IT project to handle rural subsidy payments. The Institute for Fiscal Studies said that the Commission's plans implied austerity as it could mean that public spending would drop by 4% of GDP over a decade. In an interview David Philips, the author of the IFS study, described the Growth Commission’s proposals as a "continuation of austerity", but he commended the commission for tackling the problem head on. The Fraser of Allander Institute questioned how a country running a deficit could be able to build up reserves, but recognised the report as an important contribution to the debate on Scotland’s economic future.

Defending the report, Andrew Wilson said "We have an argument that will be an effort. Money doesn't drop out of a tree, Rome wasn't built in a day, nothing falls in your lap. You don't win the lottery. What happens is you get a tool box and the ability to work, and that work will be worth it."

At the SNP Conference in April 2019 opposition to the Growth Commission's recommendation of Sterlingisation grew as SNP members defied the party leadership and voted to install a new currency as "soon as practicable after independence day".

In April 2021 Nicola Sturgeon said the figures in the 2018 report were "completely out of date", but defended the underlying approach of the report. She ruled out any new analysis of the economics of an independent Scotland until the eve of a second referendum on independence. The Growth Commission's recommendation on currency remained unpopular and in November 2021 SNP delegates at the party conference voted 481 to 37 backing a resolution to create a Scottish Central Bank charged with issuing a new Scottish pound at shorter timescale agreed at the 2019 Party Conference. Dr Tim Rideout, convenor of the Scottish Currency Group, who put forward the resolution, described the SNP's currency plans as a "dangerous experiment" and hoped the passing of the resolution would put a stake through the heart of the "Sterlingisation Zombie".

In March 2022, Kate Forbes Scotland’s Finance Minister revealed a new economic plan to boost Scotland's economy over 10 years. Scotland’s National Strategy for Economic Transformation differed to the Growth Commission in that it outlined how Scotland can improve the economy whilst remaining part of the United Kingdom.

== See also ==
- 2014 Scottish independence referendum
- Scotland's Future
