= Richard White (businessman) =

Australian businessman (born 1954)

- Born: 1954 or 1955 (age 71–72); Sydney, Australia
- Education: University of Technology Sydney
- Occupation: Executive chair of WiseTech
- Known for: Co-founding WiseTech
- Board member of: WiseTech
- Spouses: Barbara Mason (div. 2015); Zena Nasser (m. 2024)
- Website: www.wisetechglobal.com

Richard White (born 1954 or 1955) is the Australian billionaire executive chair, co-founder, and former CEO of WiseTech Global, an Australian technology company specialising in transport logistics.

He stepped down as CEO amid allegations of sexual and corporate misconduct in October 2024, but continues to chair the board.

== Early life and education ==
Richard White was born in Sydney in 1954 or 1955, and grew up in the suburb of Bexley. His father ran an engineering business, his mother sold cookware through house parties and as a youth he washed dishes for his grandparents wedding reception business.

He graduated Sydney Technical High School in 1972 and completed a master's degree in IT management in 2002.

== Career ==
He worked as a musician in a band called Jade, and as a refrigeration mechanic, later starting a small business repairing guitars called Rock Repairs.

He taught himself electronics and programming when he started building lighting systems for bands.

=== WiseTech ===
White co-founded WiseTech (then Eagle Developments International) with Maree Isaacs in 1994, having worked together previously.

The company became established in the Australian logistics industry by 2000, and expanded into the US market in 2006 under the name CargoWise. They changed the name to WiseTech in 2011. It was listed on the Australian Securities Exchange in 2016.

As of February 2025 he is executive chair of WiseTech.

In late 2025 the Australian Federal Police raided WiseTech headquarters for proof of insider trading by White and other employees, causing the stock price to drop by over 15%.

== Other activities ==
Both White personally and his company invested in Grok Academy, an Australian technology education company led by James Curran, with the aim of providing free technology education to students, and encouraging other Australian technology companies to act similarly. Grok Academy was acquired by KIK Innovation in 2024 after substantiated harassment allegations against the CEO led to its collapse.

White also began an earn-and-learn program which paid students to work at WiseTech while completing a degree.

== Sexual harassment and bullying allegations ==
In 2024 White was involved in a bankruptcy case with Linda Rogan, who alleged he expected sex in return for investing in her business. During the course of the relationship he bought her a Vaucluse home, before locking her out when his then partner Zena Nasser found out about it, leaving Rogan out of pocket for the furnishing. In the following weeks multiple other women alleged he traded business advice for sex, often approaching them over LinkedIn. Additionally, it was revealed that had a sexual relationship with an employee and bought her a "Lane Cove mansion", and an outgoing director accused him of "sustained intimidation and bullying". He subsequently stepped down as CEO of WiseTech.

He was later cleared by WiseTech of bullying and intimidation allegations, and remained on as a consultant at his former salary. It was noted by the Australian Financial Review that the "salacious revelations" had little effect on his position and influence.

In February 2025 three women, including an employee and contractor, made allegations of inappropriate behaviour against White. The same month, a Brazilian woman alleged that White gave her financial support and visa assistance in exchange for sexual relationship and settled in court that April. In June 2026, it was reported that the AFP's human exploitation taskforce was investigating the matter after the former CEO of one of White's other companies alleged he lied on her work visa.

In 2025 he blocked the release of a report into his conduct, and was promoted to executive chairman of the WiseTech board after most of the board resigned.

== Personal life ==
As of 2025 White lives in a mansion on a compound in Bexley based on the grounds of the house he grew up in. His mother, children and some old school friends live in separate houses on the site, which is energy-independent through a 100kW solar system and a 235kWh Tesla battery.

White was married to Barbara Mason until their 2015 divorce.

White married former criminal lawyer Zena Nasser in July 2024 in the United States, and they have a child via surrogacy.

=== Net worth ===
In 2018, Forbes listed White among Australia's 50 richest people with an estimated net worth of over A$1 billion. By January 2025, Forbes estimated his net worth at US$9.2 billion; and his net worth was assessed on the Financial Review 2025 Rich List at A$10.59 billion.

Year	Financial Review Rich List		Forbes Australia's 50 Richest		Sunday Times Rich List	
Year	Rank	Net worth (A$)	Rank	Net worth (US$)	Rank	Net worth (£)
2016	87 ▲	$657 million ▲				
2017	68 ▲	$882 million ▲				
2018	44 ▲	$1.66 billion ▲	32 ▲	c. $1.0 billion ▲		
2019	20 ▲	$3.31 billion ▲	17 ▲	$2.2 billion ▲		
2020	20	$4.10 billion ▲				
2021	19 ▲	$4.7 billion ▲				
2022	14 ▲	$6.33 billion ▲				
2023	11 ▲	$9.11 billion ▲	10 ▲	$5.4 billion ▲		
2024	11	$11.63 billion ▲	11 ▼	$6.3 billion ▲		
2025	15 ▼	$10.59 billion ▼	7 ▲	$9.2 billion ▲		
2026	17 ▼	$8.87 billion ▼				

Legend
Icon	Description
Steady	Has not changed from the previous year
▲	Has increased from the previous year
▼	Has decreased from the previous year
