= National Strategy for Economic Transformation (Scotland) =

Scottish economic plan

The Scottish Government's 10 year economic plan, called the National Strategy for Economic Transformation (NSET) was revealed by Cabinet Secretary for Finance and the Economy, Kate Forbes on 1 March 2022. This was the first strategic economic work the Scottish National Party administration had published since the release of the Sustainable Growth Commission report in 2018. The main difference in this report was the focus on developing Scotland's economy whilst being part of the United Kingdom rather than becoming independent. Ms Forbes wanted to "deliver the best economic performance possible for Scotland within the current constitutional constraints". She identified the need for action because of Scotland's poor productivity and comparable low-levels of business start-ups. She said Scotland lagged behind the OECD average in terms of productivity, and boosting this could raise wages by 10%.

== Contents ==
The 56-page report described six programmes, 18 projects and 77 specific actions which would aim to improve Scotland's economy over a decade, by making Scotland fairer, wealthier and greener. The main areas it focused on were creating an entrepreneurial culture, developing new market opportunities, and improving productivity, upskilling the workforce and creating a fairer and more equal society. The First Minister of Scotland Nicola Sturgeon will convene a panel of investors to attract green inward investment to Scotland to help hit climate change targets. The strategy will also attempt to improve digital links and develop a "national digital academy" to help people improve their skills. Tackling poverty through fairer work conditions is also key aim, as well as helping women, people from ethnic minority backgrounds and disabled people into the workforce. The Scottish Government is committed to the "ruthless and relentless delivery" of the outcomes it details in the report.

Although too early to tell the outcome of the strategy, there were mixed reactions to the publication of the report. The STUC branded it a "missed opportunity" and the entrepreneur Sir Tom Hunter described the plan as a “long wish list with no magic wand”. However Sandy Begbie, the chief executive of the Scottish Financial Enterprise, was encouraged to see entrepreneurialism as the core focus of the strategy.

== See also ==
- Sustainable Growth Commission
- Scottish National Investment Bank
