= Grok Academy =

Australian educational technology company

- Type: Not-for-profit
- Industry: Educational technology; Educational
- Founded: 2013; 13 years ago in Sydney
- Founders: James Curran; Tara Murphy; Nicky Ringland; Tim Dawborn
- Headquarters: Adelaide, South Australia, Australia
- Website: grokacademy.org

Grok Academy is an Australian computing education company, which produces and delivers online courses aimed at high school students. In 2024 it had over 200,000 unique users.

== History ==
=== Grok Learning ===
Grok Academy (then Grok Learning) was founded by James Curran, Tara Murphy, Nicky Ringland and Tim Dawborn in 2013 as an online learning platform to teach high school students programming. It began as an online platform within the University of Sydney which ran a yearly self-paced programming course called the NCSS Challenge (named after the National Computer Science School, a summer camp hosted by the University of Sydney). Eventually, they found there was demand for more courses, so split from the university to form a for-profit company.

=== Australian Computing Academy ===
The Australian Computing Academy was a not-for-profit within the University of Sydney which developed computing education courses with funding government and non government organisations to be delivered on the Grok Learning platform. James Curran, the then CEO of Grok Learning, was the academic director. They provided both general purpose programming courses, cybersecurity courses, and mining themed courses with sponsors including the Australian government, ANZ, Commonwealth Bank, National Australia Bank, Westpac, BT Group and the Chamber of Minerals and Energy.

In 2020 the Australian Computing Academy left the University of Sydney and merged with Grok Learning to form Grok Academy.

=== Richard White funding ===
In 2022, Australian tech billionaire Richard White became a major donor to Grok Academy, allowing them to provide their courses free of charge to all school students, having previously charged a subscription fee.

Additionally, starting in 2022, White's company, WiseTech Global donated 1% of its pre-tax profit (which The Australian estimated at 300 million dollars) to Grok Academy as part of a 5 year commitment.

== Sexual harassment allegations and acquisition ==
In October 2024 the company lost funding and approximately 80% of its staff after multiple allegations of harassment against its CEO and founder, James Curran, were sustained by independent investigations. It was reported that over a 10-year span there were nine women, including six who were in high school at the time, that allege Curran sent them inappropriate messages.

Additionally, it was revealed that a 2019 University of Sydney investigation found 35 cases of harassment, after which Curran received a warning and a 2024 University of New South Wales investigation was referred to the NSW police.

The company was acquired by KIK Innovation, an Adelaide based social impact charity, later that year.

== Product and reach ==
Grok Academy creates and publishes computing education courses for primary and high school students aimed at an Australian audience. In 2024, it had a reach of over 200,000 students and 5000 teachers across Australia.

In 2024 it produced an unaired reality TV show called Future Fixers aimed at encouraging kids to code, alongside Jenine Beekhuyzen from the Tech Girls Movement Foundation and Rawkus. The show was abandoned during post production after harassment allegations against cohost and former Grok CEO James Curran became known.

It also ran a 10-day summer school called The NCSS Summer School in Melbourne and Sydney for elite students until 2024.
