= Tara Murphy =

Australian astrophysicist and researcher

- Education: The University of Sydney (BS) The University of Edinburgh (Astrophysics, PhD)
- Occupations: Astrophysicist, CAASTRO Chief investigator, Head of School of Physics at The University of Sydney
- Title: Professor

Tara Murphy is an Australian astrophysicist and CAASTRO (the ARC Centre of Excellence for All-sky Astrophysics) chief investigator working in the School of Physics at the University of Sydney. Murphy led a group that first confirmed radio emissions from the 2017 Neutron Star Merger event which provided evidence for a global scientific announcement in the field of gravitational waves.

== Education ==
Murphy completed a Bachelor of Science at the University of Sydney and a PhD (Astrophysics) at the University of Edinburgh.

== Career ==
In 2013, Murphy co-founded a start-up company called Grok Learning with her partner James Curran, and PHD students Nicky Ringland, and Tim Dawborn. Grok is an online learning platform that teaches computing to school students.

During the global effort to record the 2017 Neutron Star Merger, Murphy led a group at the University of Sydney that confirmed the first radio signals of gravitational waves that were caused by two neutron stars colliding in a galaxy 130 million light-years from Earth. This discovery was made 15 days after these gravitational waves were first reported by an international team of scientists and astronomers.

In 2019, Murphy and her PhD student gathered data using the CSIRO's Australia Telescope Compact Array at Narrabri in New South Wales to observe radio emissions created by a shockwave from a mysterious cosmic 'cow' explosion, and potential birth of a black hole. Their findings suggested that there was a magnetar at the core of the supernova, and that this event was different from the typical supernova as there was energy that continued to power the explosion allowing the 'cow' to inexplicably become brighter with time.

== Honours and recognition ==
- 2024 ARC Discovery Project: "Gravitational wave discovery"
- 2023 ARC Discovery Project: "Australian Participation in the Legacy Survey of Space and Time"
- 2022 ARC Discovery Project: "Illuminating the cosmic web with fast radio bursts"
- 2022 ARC Discovery Project: "The next generation fast radio burst detector for Australia"
- 2019 ARC Discovery Project: "Radio follow-up of gravitational wave events"
- 2016 ARC Future Fellow: "The radio transient sky in real time"
- 2012 Young Tall Poppy Award
- 2011 ARC Discovery Project: "Extreme Events: Mining the Radio Sky for Gamma-ray Bursts with Intelligent Algorithms"
- 2010 ARC Super Science: "New Dimensions in Radio Astronomy: Mining Sparse Datasets with the Australian SKA Pathfinder"
