= Andrew Wilson (economist) =

Scottish politician, born 1970

Member of the Scottish Parliament for Central Scotland (1 of 7 Regional MSPs)
- In office 6 May 1999 – 31 March 2003
- Preceded by: Constituency established

Personal details
- Born: 1970 (age 55–56) Lanark, South Lanarkshire, Scotland
- Party: Scottish National Party
- Children: 3
- Education: University of Strathclyde; University of St. Andrews
- Occupation: Economist, Communications

Andrew Wilson (born 1970 in Lanark, Scotland) is an economist, businessman and former Member of the Scottish Parliament (MSP). He is the Director of Communications, Marketing & Responsible Banking at Santander UK. He chaired the Sustainable Growth Commission, which gave its completed report to First Minister of Scotland Nicola Sturgeon, in 2018.

== Early life and education ==
Whilst attending the University of Strathclyde, Glasgow, (from where he graduated in 1992 with a degree in economics and politics) Wilson was elected vice president of the Students Association and became national convener of the Scottish National Party (SNP) student organisation, the Federation of Student Nationalists. He joined the Government Economic Service after graduation, serving with the Forestry Commission and Scottish Office, and in 1996 he started work at SNP Headquarters, Edinburgh, as a researcher to the director of Business for Scotland, before entering employment with the Royal Bank of Scotland as a business economist in 1997.

== Career ==
=== Member of Scottish Parliament ===
Wilson was elected to the first session of the newly re-established Scottish Parliament, as one of five SNP MSPs to represent Central Scotland through the Additional Members System.

Whilst an MSP he served variously in the Shadow Cabinet as the SNP Finance, Economy, Lifelong Learning and Transport Spokesperson. He was widely viewed by commentators as a rising star of the SNP, an iconoclast and pro-market economist he made much headway selling the idea of fiscal autonomy now called 'Devo-Max' to the mainstream business, media and society. It was adopted by The Scotsman, a unionist newspaper and later went on to win support across the political spectrum. He gave a controversial lecture at the party conference in 1999 promoting the idea Britishness could, should, and would survive independence. He later wrote a column for the Sunday Mail calling on Scots to support the English football team in the 2002 world cup finals. In policy he is credited with much of the work on the SNP's alternative to the private finance initiative, now The Scottish Futures Trust. He also promoted the case for a Scottish Sovereign wealth fund using the proceeds of North Sea oil.

In 2003 he came within 520 votes of unseating Cathie Craigie in the first past the post contest for the Cumbernauld and Kilsyth seat, but when only three SNP MSPs were returned from Central Scotland he lost his place as an MSP.

=== After parliament ===
Following political service Wilson joined RBS Group working in a variety of roles including Deputy Chief Economist and Head of Group Communications. He joined WPP in August 2012 working in a client facing role.

He delivered the Donaldson Lecture at the 2013 SNP conference.

In 2014 he launched a new strategic communications consultancy Charlotte Street Partners based in Edinburgh and London. Along with co-founder Malcolm Robertson, he topped a list of "names to watch" published by The Scotsman in 2014. He left Charlotte Street Partners in February 2023 before joining the executive committee of Santander UK plc as Director of Communications and Responsible Banking in March 2023.

He was a trustee of the John Smith Memorial Trust and the John Smith Centre for Public Service at the University of Glasgow. He is a former member of the Governing Board of the Scottish Crop Research Institute and between 2010-2015 and 2020-2024 he was a director of Motherwell F.C. He is a member of the Institute for Fiscal Studies and the David Hume Institute. He has also served as a trustee for National Galleries Scotland, and Sistema Scotland, a social transformation charity engaging children through orchestral music.

He is a former columnist for the Scotland on Sunday and writes occasional opinion pieces for other newspapers including The Scotsman, The Times, The Daily Telegraph, the Daily Record and The National.

In September 2016, he was appointed to chair the Sustainable Growth Commission reporting to the First Minister of Scotland. In October 2017, he was also appointed to the Independent Commission on Referendums at University College London's Constitution Unit.

Wilson is a Trustee for the Edinburgh International Culture Summit Foundation, and a Director of the Aldersgate Group.

== Personal life ==
Wilson lives in Perthshire and in Edinburgh with his wife Mhairi Wilson who he married in Florence in July 2022. He has three children and a stepson.
