= Kate Forbes =

Deputy First Minister of Scotland from 2024 to 2026

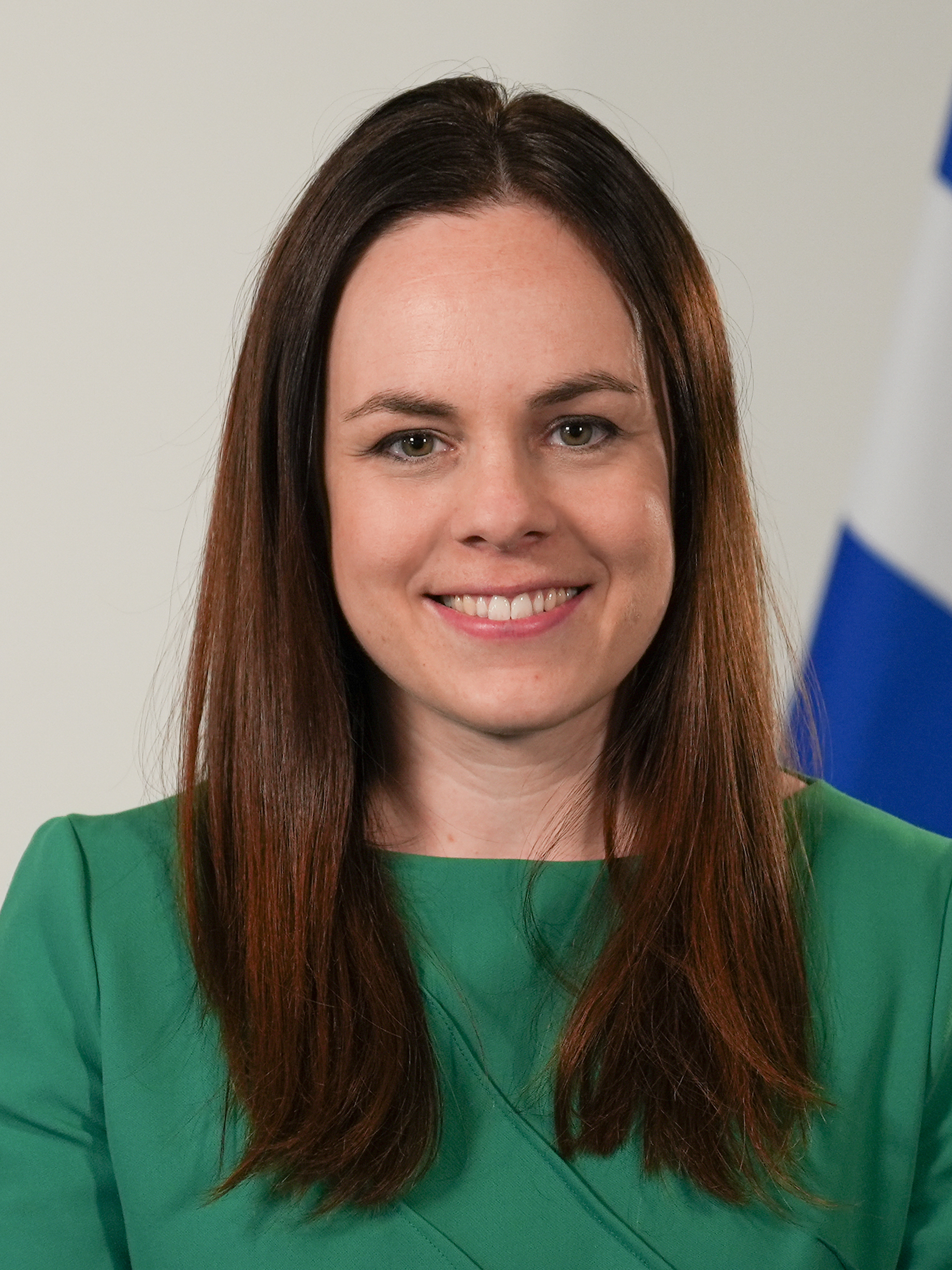
- Official portrait, 2024

Deputy First Minister of Scotland
- In office 8 May 2024 – 20 May 2026
- First Minister: John Swinney
- Preceded by: Shona Robison
- Succeeded by: Jenny Gilruth

Cabinet Secretary for Economy and Gaelic
- In office 9 May 2024 – 20 May 2026
- First Minister: John Swinney
- Preceded by: Màiri McAllan (Economy)
- Succeeded by: Stephen Flynn (Economy); Màiri McAllan (Gaelic)

Cabinet Secretary for Finance and the Economy (Note: The post was titled Cabinet Secretary for Finance from 2020 to 2021 before assuming responsibility for the Economy from Fiona Hyslop.)
- In office 17 February 2020 – 28 March 2023 (Note: Forbes was on maternity leave from 16 July 2022 until 28 March 2023; John Swinney was acting Cabinet Secretary for Finance and the Economy in her absence.)
- First Minister: Nicola Sturgeon
- Preceded by: Derek Mackay
- Succeeded by: Shona Robison (Finance); Neil Gray (Wellbeing Economy, Fair Work and Energy)

Minister for Public Finance and Digital Economy
- In office 27 June 2018 – 17 February 2020
- First Minister: Nicola Sturgeon
- Preceded by: Office established
- Succeeded by: Ben Macpherson

Member of the Scottish Parliament for Skye, Lochaber and Badenoch
- In office 5 May 2016 – 9 April 2026
- Preceded by: Dave Thompson
- Succeeded by: Andrew Baxter

Personal details
- Born: Kate Elizabeth Forbes; 6 April 1990 (age 36) Dingwall, Highland, Scotland
- Party: Scottish National Party (SNP)
- Spouse: Alasdair MacLennan (m. 2021)
- Children: 1
- Education: Selwyn College, Cambridge (BA); University of Edinburgh (MSc)
- Website: www.parliament.scot/msps/current-and-previous-msps/kate-forbes

Kate Elizabeth Forbes (born 6 April 1990) is a Scottish politician who served as Deputy First Minister of Scotland and Cabinet Secretary for Economy and Gaelic from 2024 to 2026. A member of the Scottish National Party (SNP), she previously served as Cabinet Secretary for Finance and the Economy from 2020 to 2023. Forbes was the Member of the Scottish Parliament (MSP) for Skye, Lochaber and Badenoch from 2016 to 2026.

Born in Dingwall, Forbes was raised in India and Scotland and was educated at a Scottish Gaelic-medium school, where she became fluent in Scottish Gaelic. She earned a BA degree in history at Selwyn College, Cambridge, and then an MSc in diaspora and migration history from the University of Edinburgh. After completing her degree, Forbes worked for a short time in the Scottish Parliament as a researcher for the SNP MSP Dave Thompson. Forbes was elected as an MSP at the 2016 Scottish Parliament election and quickly rose within the SNP. Nicola Sturgeon appointed Forbes as Minister for Public Finance and Digital Economy, serving as the deputy to the Finance Secretary, Derek Mackay. After Mackay resigned, Forbes was appointed Finance Secretary by Sturgeon. Her tenure was dominated by the COVID-19 pandemic in Scotland and its economic impact, and the cost of living crisis.

On announcement of Sturgeon's intention to resign as party leader and first minister, Forbes announced her candidacy for leader in the 2023 leadership election. This leadership bid drew significant attention due to her membership of the Free Church of Scotland, an evangelical Calvinist denomination with socially conservative positions, and her religious views on sexual ethics, including disavowal of sexual intercourse before marriage, opposition to homosexuality and same-sex marriage, and opposition to most forms of abortion. She lost the election to Humza Yousaf, taking 47.9 per cent of the vote to his 52.1 per cent in the final ballot. She subsequently left government to sit as a backbencher.

Following Yousaf's resignation in April 2024, Forbes was touted as a potential candidate to succeed him in the 2024 SNP leadership election but she ultimately chose not to stand and endorsed John Swinney. After Swinney became First Minister in May 2024, he appointed Forbes as Deputy First Minister of Scotland and Cabinet Secretary for Economy and Gaelic in his government. On 4 August 2025, Forbes announced that she would be stepping down as an MSP at the 2026 election.

== Early life and career ==
=== Early life ===
Kate Elizabeth Forbes was born in Dingwall in Ross and Cromarty, Scotland on 6 April 1990. She is the eldest of four siblings: her mother is a teacher and her father is an accountant. Her parents were missionaries for the evangelical Free Church of Scotland. She spent her early years in the village of Marybank, where her parents ran a small business. At an early age, Forbes moved to India for three years, where her father worked for various Christian charities to provide healthcare to people who could not afford it. Forbes' father later studied for a PhD in the Indian Stock Exchange and managed hospitals, relying on charitable donations because he made no income.

=== Education ===
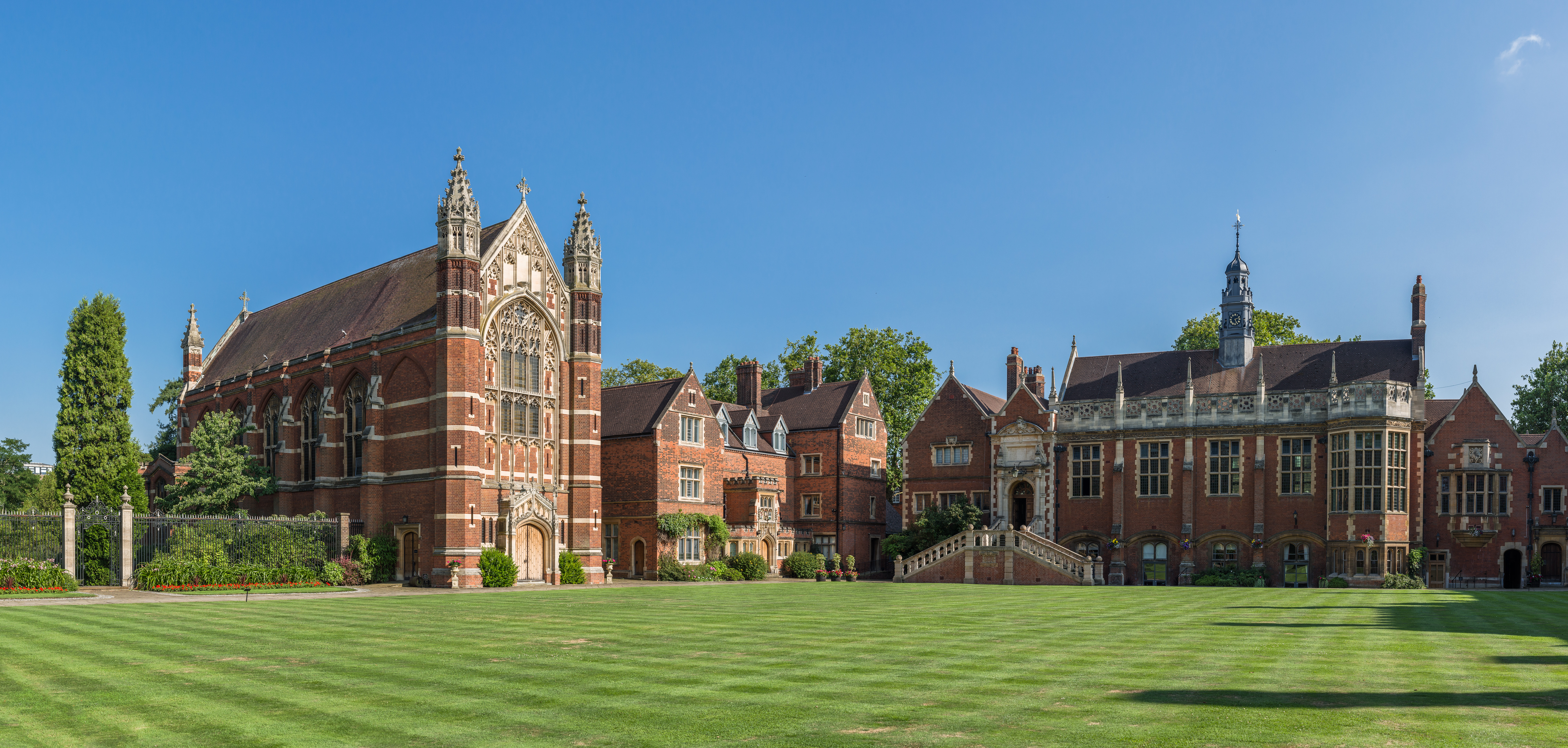
Forbes attended Selwyn College, Cambridge from 2008 to 2011

She returned to Scotland and was taught in a Scottish Gaelic school, where she became fluent in the language. She returned to India when she was ten and studied at Woodstock School in the foothills of the Himalayas. Forbes returned to Scotland, this time in Glasgow, at the age of 15 where she attended a secondary school in the city before moving back to the Highlands to finish her schooling at Dingwall Academy.

Forbes attended Selwyn College, Cambridge, graduating with a Bachelor of Arts in History in 2011. She then studied at the University of Edinburgh, where she gained a Master of Science in Diaspora and Migration History in 2013.

=== Early career ===
Forbes joined the Scottish National Party (SNP) in 2011, having previously been active in the party's youth wing the Young Scots for Independence.

After graduating, Forbes worked in the Scottish Parliament in 2011 as a researcher for Dave Thompson, the SNP MSP for Skye, Lochaber and Badenoch. In February 2023, openDemocracy revealed her first, year-long job as a researcher was funded by Christian Action, Research and Education, which is known for its opposition to abortion and LGBT rights.

Forbes later studied to qualify (qualifying after she was elected in 2016) as a chartered accountant and worked at Barclays for two years as a trainee graduate accountant.

== Member of the Scottish Parliament (2016–2026) ==
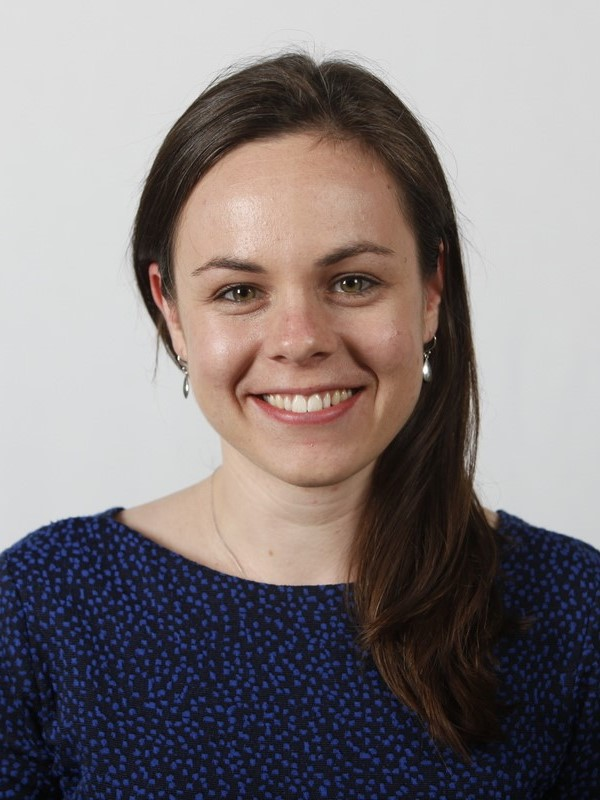
Official parliamentary portrait, 2016

=== Election (2015–2016) ===
In August 2015, Forbes was selected from an all-women shortlist by local SNP members as their candidate for the Skye, Lochaber and Badenoch constituency held by Dave Thompson who would not be standing at the next election. She was part of an SNP campaign to address the gender pay gap around employment in the Highlands. She was elected in the 2016 Scottish Parliament election, doubling the majority from her predecessor from 4995 to 9045.

=== Backbencher (2016–2018) ===
As a backbencher, Forbes was Convener of the Scottish Parliament's Cross-Party Group on Gaelic. She served on the Scottish Parliament’s Environment, Climate Change and Land Reform Committee, the Standards, Procedures and Public Appointments Committee, the Health and Sport Committee and the Rural Economy and Connectivity Committee. She also served as Parliamentary Liaison Officer for Finance and the Constitution.

In 2017, Forbes launched The Final Straw, a national campaign to ban the use of plastic straws in Scotland. The campaign was supported by the Marine Conservation Society. Forbes wrote to all of Scotland's 32 councils to support the campaign, with Comhairle nan Eilean Siar being the first Scottish council to pledge to go plastic straw-free. Her campaign was successful after a ban of single-use plastic was introduced in August 2022.

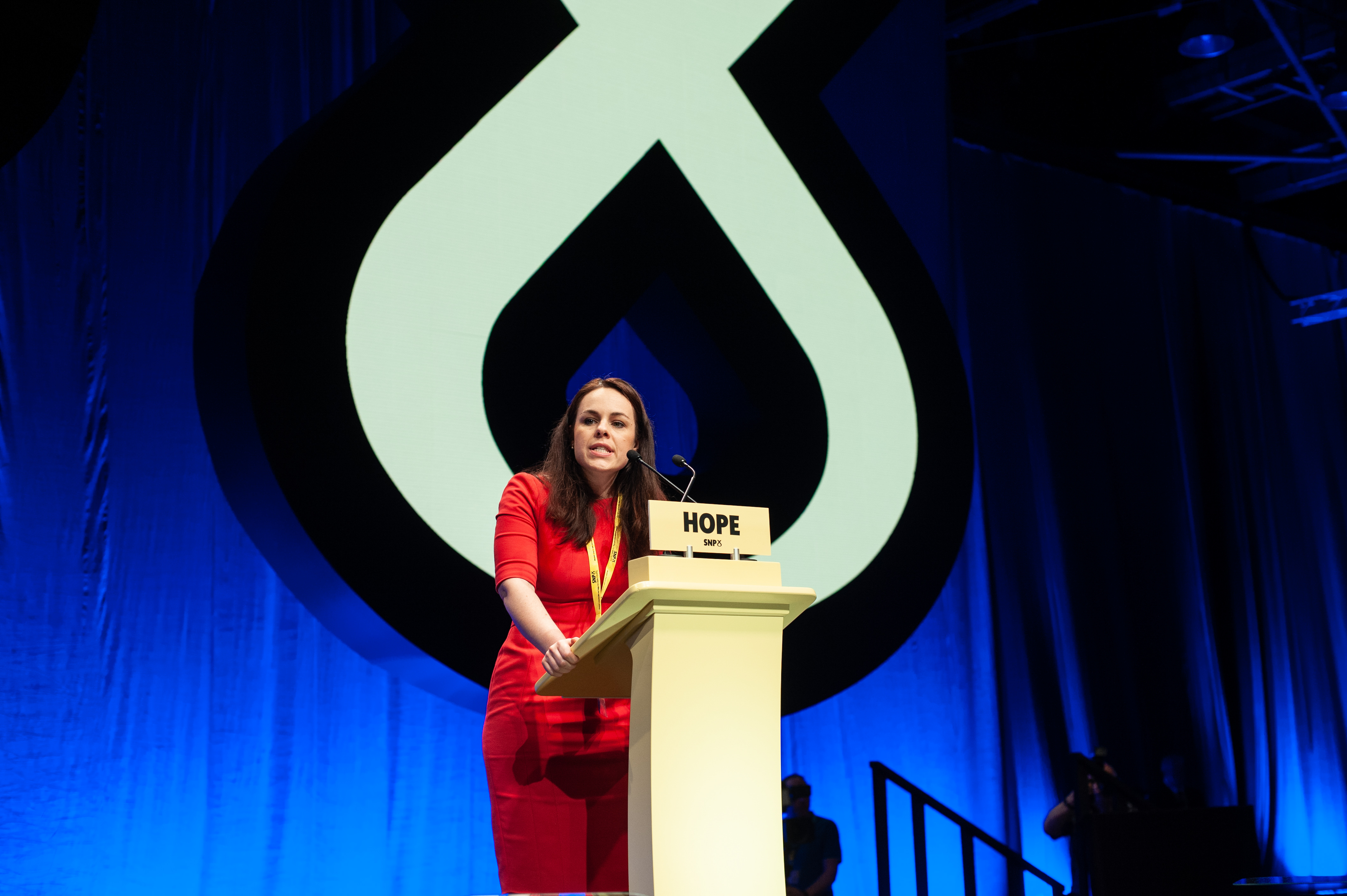
Forbes speaking at the 2018 SNP Conference

In March 2018, she delivered an entire speech to the parliament in Gaelic during a plenary debate on the language. She has spoken in favour of UNESCO Intangible Cultural Heritage status as a possible way to protect the language. She campaigned for local issues, such as increasing the number of foster carers in the Highlands, and raised concerns of a lack of teachers in specialist subjects in the Highlands.

In May 2018, Forbes called on the government to let children practise religious belief in school without mockery, saying "I wanted to note that pupils should be allowed to explore, develop and understand the diversity of religious faith in Scotland, because if they can understand it in school you will hope that as they go through the rest of their life they will be tolerant of people who believe that things are different to them."

Forbes was awarded "One to Watch" at the 2018 Scottish Politician of the Year awards, having been nominated the previous year.

== Sturgeon government (2018–2023) ==
=== Deputy Finance Secretary (2018–2020) ===
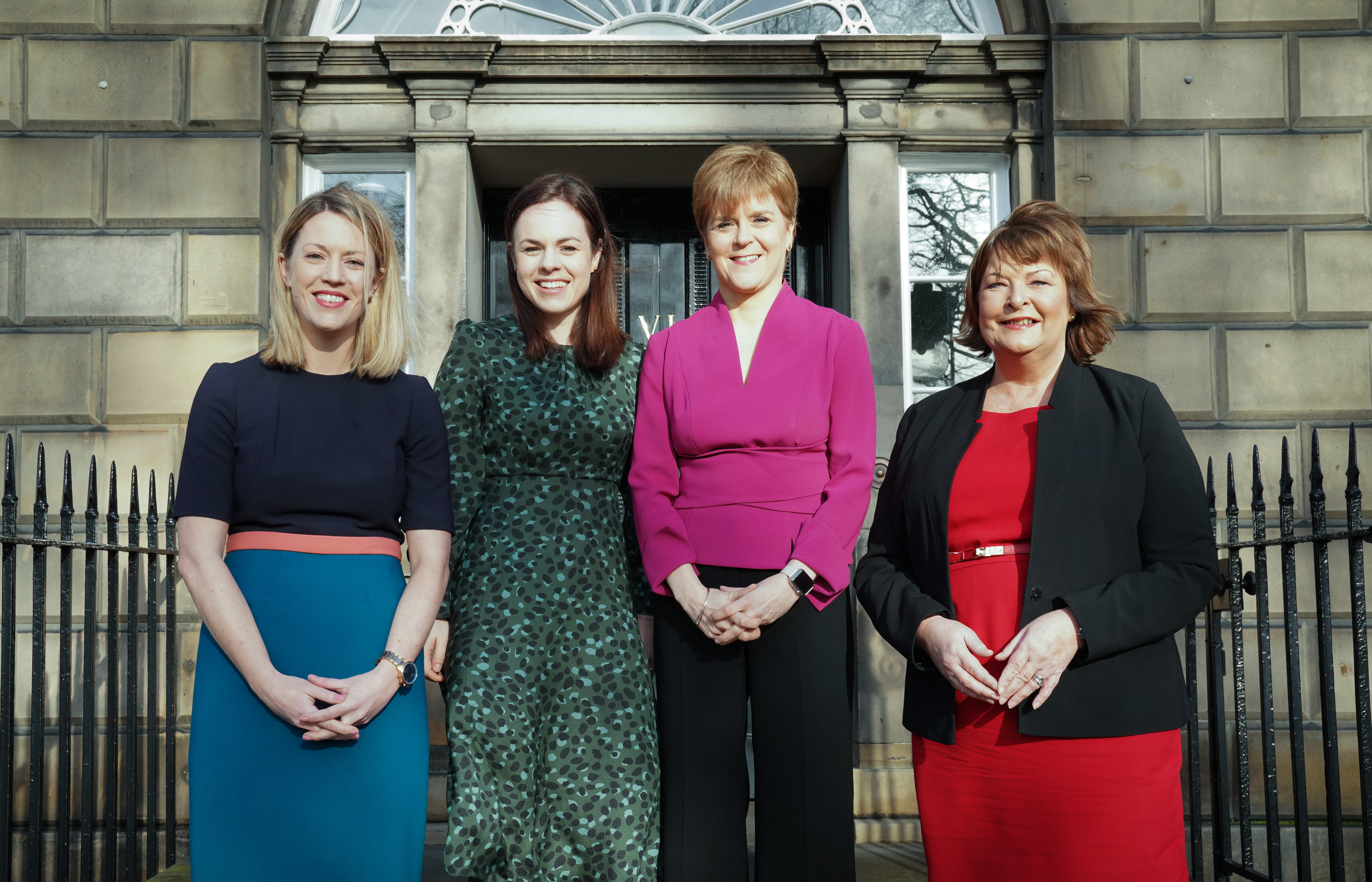
Forbes outside Bute House following her appointment to the Scottish cabinet, 17 February 2020. (From left to right; Jenny Gilruth, herself, First Minister Nicola Sturgeon, and Fiona Hyslop.)

On 27 June 2018, she was appointed to the Scottish Government as Minister for Public Finance and Digital Economy, as part of a wider reshuffle announced by First Minister, Nicola Sturgeon. She supported the Cabinet Secretary for Finance, Economy and Fair Work.

In September 2018, The David Hume Institute reported that the government had made "no progress" on improving productivity in workplaces; Forbes commented that "over the last decade, productivity in Scotland has grown at more than three times the rate it has across the UK as a whole". In 2018, Forbes reiterated the SNP's commitment to 100 per cent broadband coverage throughout Scotland; the original 2021 completion target was later put back. Forbes opposed the proposal to devolve business rates to Scottish councils.

=== 2020 Scottish Budget ===
On 6 February 2020, the day of the 2020 Scottish Budget, Derek Mackay resigned as the finance secretary, after the Scottish Sun reported he had inappropriately messaged a 16-year-old boy on social media. Forbes was left to deliver the budget hours later. Prior to this, no woman had delivered a Budget in either the Scottish Parliament or Westminster. Due to the late delivery of the UK Budget, Forbes raised concerns of the impact this would have on the passing of the Scottish Budget and told the Scottish Parliament there would be a very brief period for MSPs to scrutinise it.

In the budget, she announced there would be no changes to income tax rates and that the threshold for upper rates will be frozen, calling it the "fairest and most progressive income tax system in the UK".

=== Cabinet Secretary for Finance (2020–2023) ===
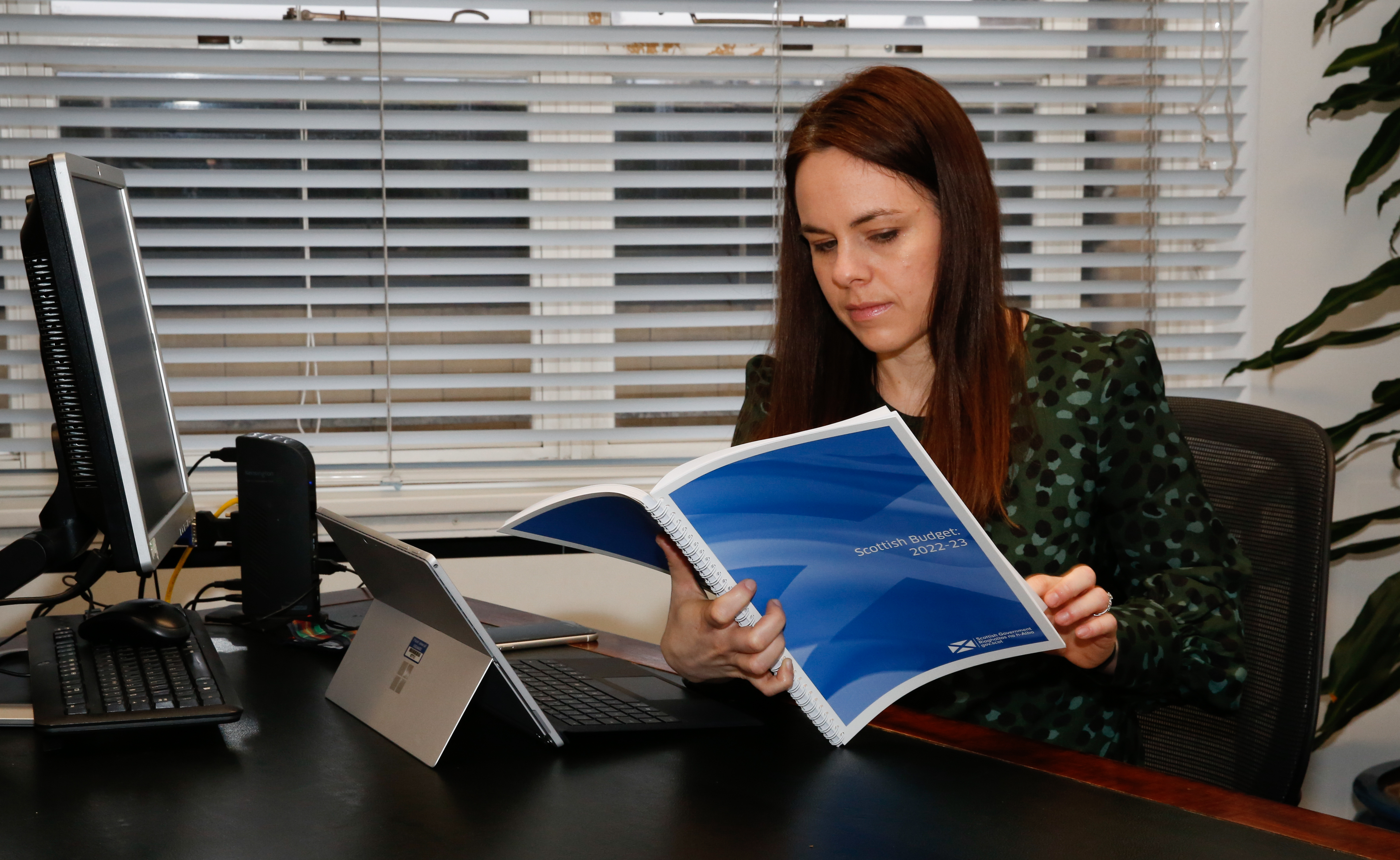
Forbes prepares the 2022–2023 Scottish budget, December 2021

On 17 February 2020, Forbes was appointed Cabinet Secretary for Finance—the first woman to hold the post. In the 2021 Scottish Parliament election, she was re-elected with a majority of 15,681 votes, 7,000 more than in the previous election. Sturgeon formed her third administration and re-appointed Forbes as Finance Secretary, with economy added to her portfolio, as Cabinet Secretary for Finance and the Economy.

In July 2022, John Swinney took on responsibility for the Finance and Economy portfolio as Forbes went on maternity leave. She is the first Cabinet Secretary in the Scottish Government to take maternity leave.

Forbes left the Scottish Government in March 2023 after Sturgeon resigned, and new First Minister Humza Yousaf offered her the role of Cabinet Secretary for Rural Affairs and Islands in his Government. This was deemed as a demotion and Forbes rejected Yousaf’s offer, therefore she left government on 28 March 2023.

=== COVID-19 pandemic ===
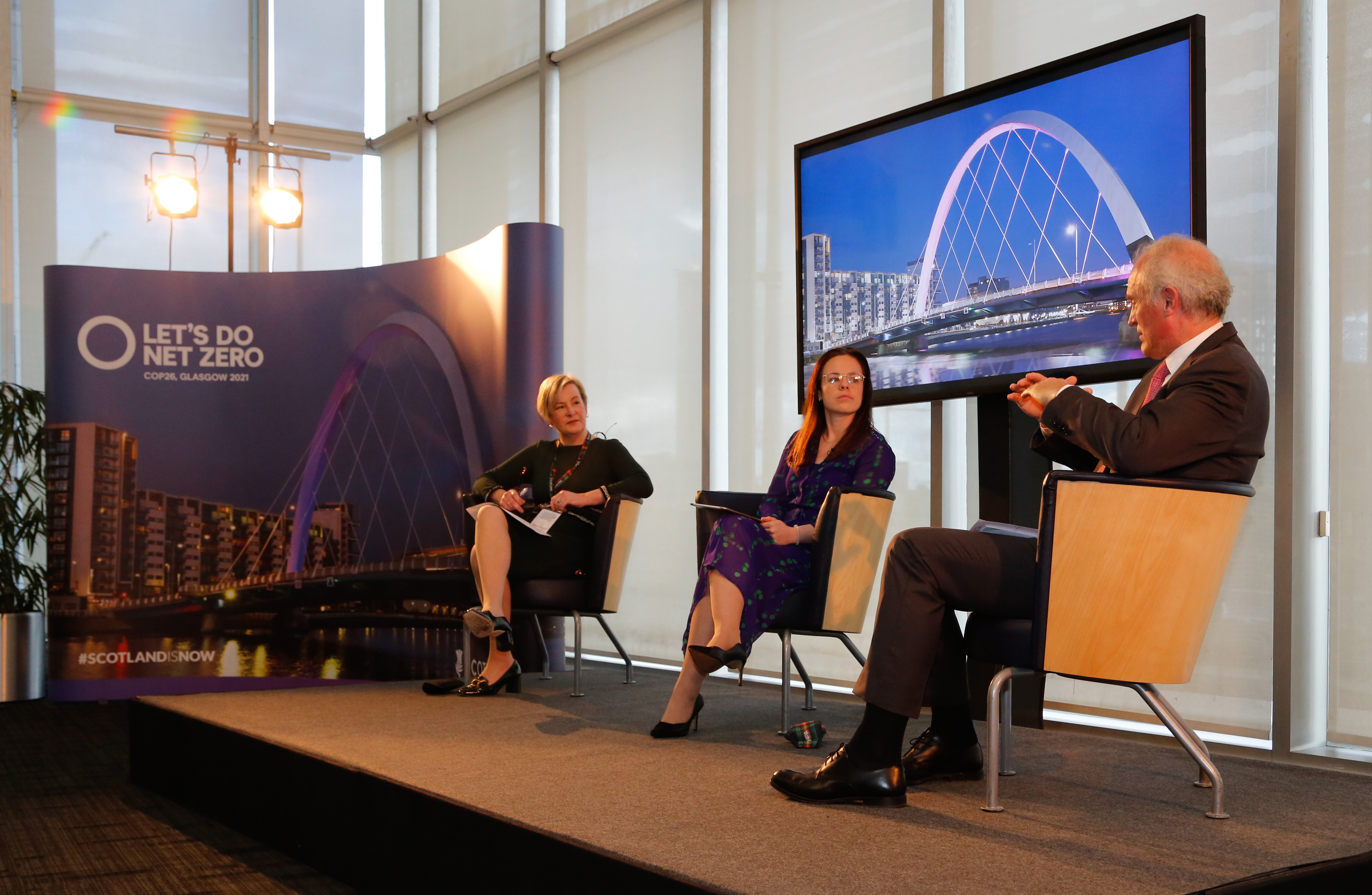
Forbes with Florent Menegaux, Chief Executive of Michelin at Atlantic Quay Glasgow in November 2021

During the COVID-19 pandemic, the Bank of England ordered a round of quantitative easing to keep UK borrowing affordable and interest rates low. SNP policy is that during the early years of independence Scotland would use sterling without a formal currency union and so would not have a central bank that could perform quantitative easing. In December 2021 Forbes responded to a query on this issue and posed the question, "Would it be such a great loss not to be able to conduct quantitative easing?" When the issue was raised at a session of First Minister's Questions, Forbes' query was labelled "economically illiterate" by Labour MP Ian Murray.

Ahead of Christmas 2021 Forbes delivered her budget in which she spoke of "very difficult choices" because of the "acute" problems posed by Covid. All 32 of Scotland's Council leaders wrote to the Scottish Government to complain about Forbes' £371 million cut in real terms to local authority funding. Cosla President Alison Evison said, "Many in the meeting described this settlement for local government as the worst they had seen. Council leaders were clear last night that we could not sit back and simply accept this and there was a real strength of feeling that enough is enough."

=== 2022 Scottish budget ===
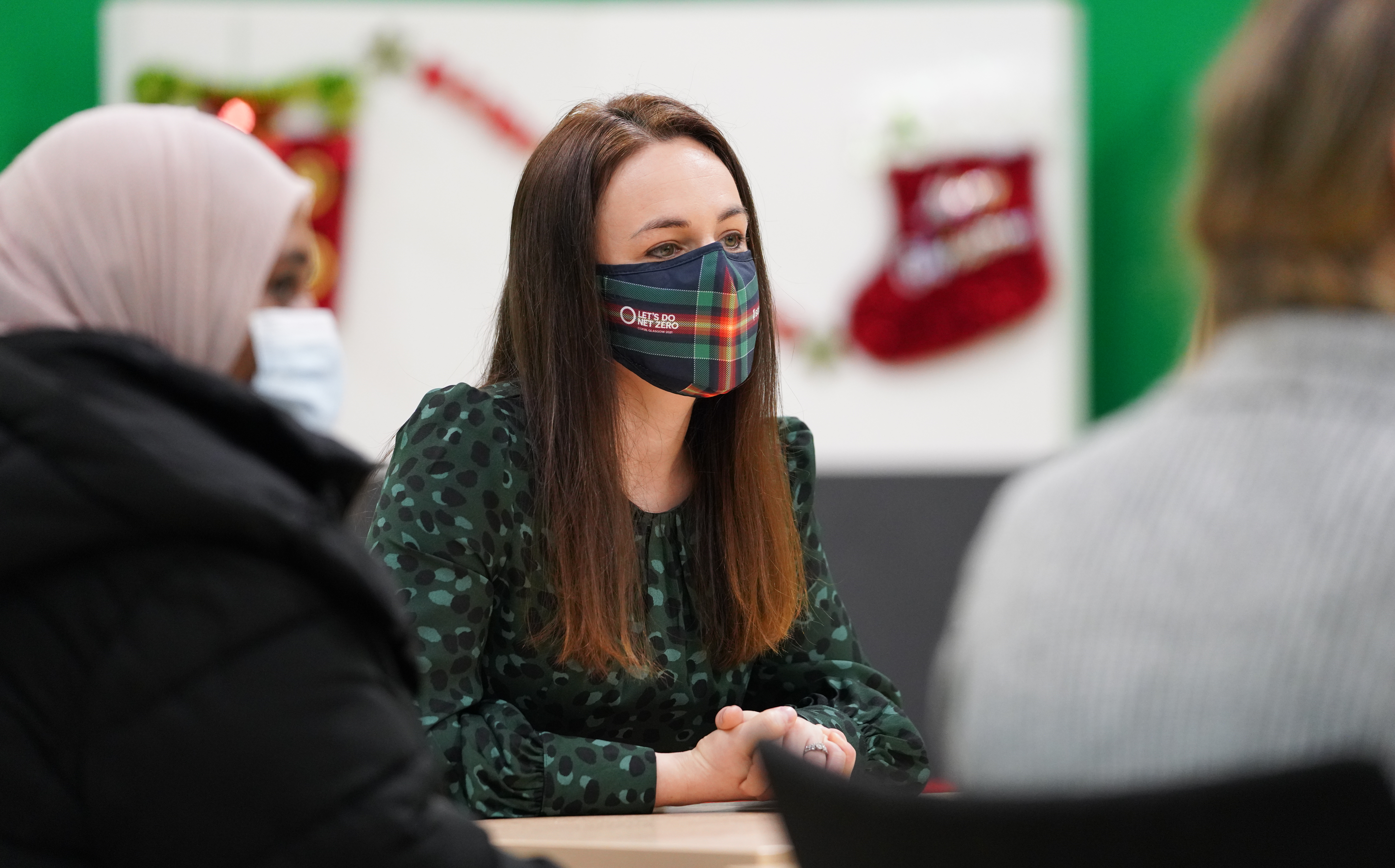
Forbes visiting Goodtrees Neighbourhood Centre ahead of the 2022 Scottish budget on 8 December 2021.

In December 2021, Forbes introduced the 2022 Scottish budget, detailing the government's spending proposals amid the COVID-19 pandemic. It also outlined the recent election win pledges made by the SNP and the policies of the SNP-Green agreement.

Forbes laid firm her commitment to keep income tax rates the same, however, the budget increased the thresholds at which it is paid for low income earners. For Scottish Landfill Tax, standard rates and lower rates are set to be increased, while land and buildings transaction tax rates will remain at the same level. Forbes announced the council tax freeze, which was imposed last year, would come to an end. This gives councils in Scotland the ability to set their own rates for the first time since the SNP came into power in 2007. The budget set out £1.95bn to begin the delivery of the Adult Disability Payment, with a total £4bn funding into social security. This includes £197M to double the Scottish Child Payment, from £10 to £20.

== 2023 SNP leadership candidacy ==
Campaign logo

On 15 February 2023, Sturgeon announced her intention to resign as Leader of the Scottish National Party and as First Minister of Scotland, which triggered an election within the SNP to choose her successor. Considered a "rising star" by many within her party, Forbes was ranked as an early front-runner by bookmakers. She is a member of the Free Church of Scotland, an evangelical Calvinist denomination with socially conservative positions, such as opposition to abortion and to same-sex marriage. Forbes had previously stated that she "[makes her] own decisions" on issues "according to [her] faith, not according to the diktat of any church".

Forbes officially launched her candidacy for leader on 20 February, stating she could not "sit back and watch our nation [be] thwarted on the road to self-determination". Forbes told STV News on 20 February that she would not have supported the Gender Recognition Reform (GRR) bill in its current form and that she did not support challenging the Westminster government's Section 35 order stopping it, instead seeking negotiation with Westminster to agree changes to the bill. In an interview with the BBC, she declared that she would have resigned as finance minister over the GRR bill were she not on maternity leave at the time of its passage.

Following Forbes' comment that she did not support same-sex marriage, SNP MSPs who had previously supported her candidacy, including Richard Lochhead, Clare Haughey, Tom Arthur, Gillian Martin and Drew Hendry, withdrew their support. In a Twitter statement released on 23 February, Forbes expressed regret at the "hurt" her comments caused to her "friends, colleagues and fellow citizens". She pledged that she would "protect the rights of everybody in Scotland".

A poll released on 25 February 2023 suggested that 23% of Scottish voters preferred Forbes as first minister, compared to 15% who preferred Humza Yousaf and 7% who preferred Ash Regan. The same poll indicated that 20% of 2021 SNP voters preferred Forbes as first minister, compared to 18% for Yousaf and 9% for Regan.

In the second round of STV voting in March 2023, Forbes came in second place with 23,890 votes from eligible SNP members, equating to 47.9% of the overall vote-share, losing the vote to Humza Yousaf.

== Return to backbenches (2023–2024) ==
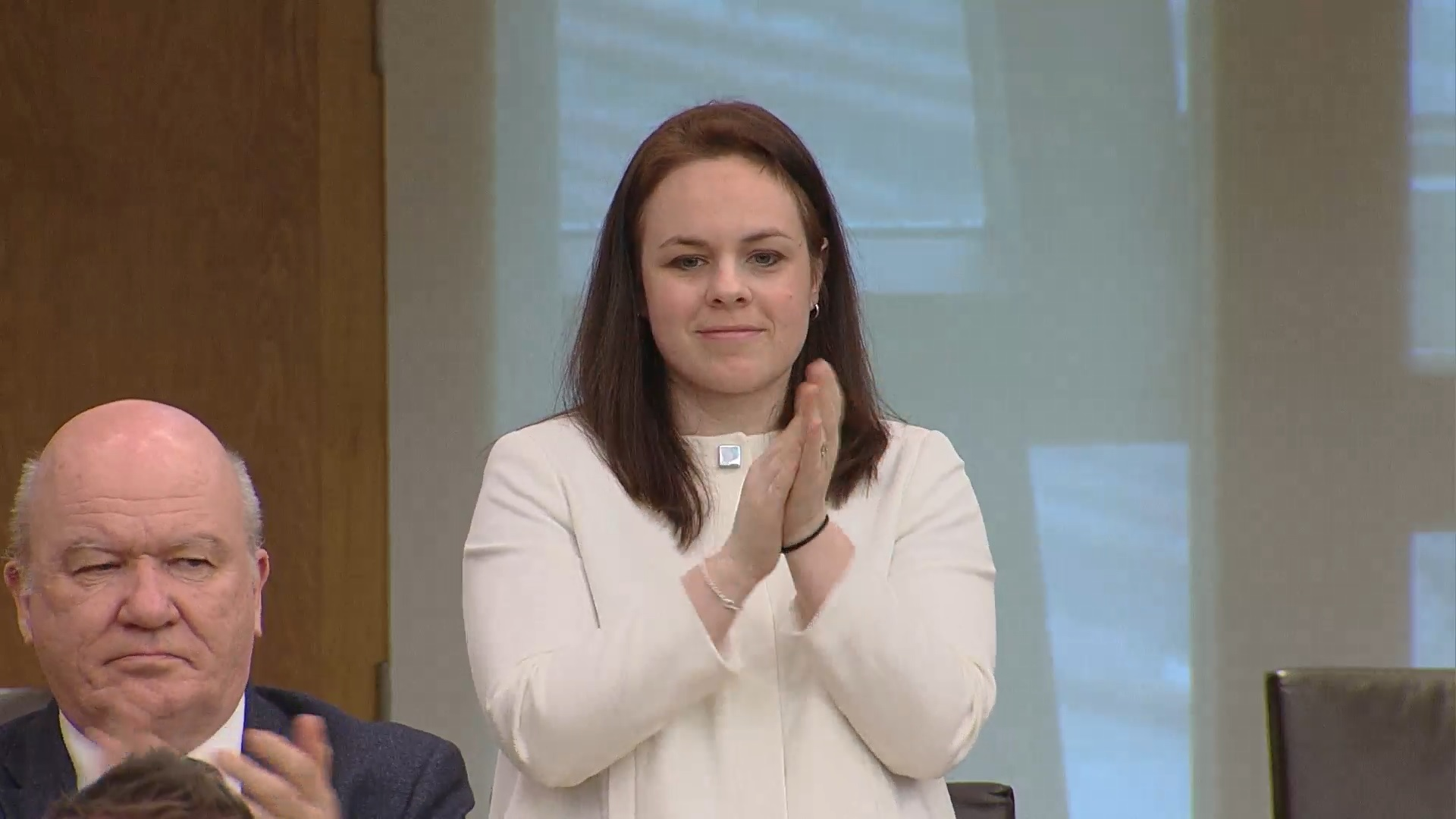
Forbes on the SNP backbenches, March 2023

Following Forbes' defeat in the leadership election, newly appointed First Minister Humza Yousaf invited Forbes to serve in his cabinet as rural affairs secretary. Opponents to the Yousaf campaign called this move a demotion, however, Forbes emphasised any role in government was privilege to her. She turned down the offer and instead left government. She remained as an SNP backbencher, where she continued to represent her Highland constituency of Skye, Lochaber and Badenoch.

Forbes was announced as a new columnist for The National in April 2023.

In her first interview since her leadership bid, Forbes told BBC Radio 4 the SNP needs to take decisive action amid the party's fraud inquiry by Police Scotland. She described the events that followed Sturgeon's resignation as turmoil for the party. Forbes quoted her leadership slogan of "continuity won't cut it" as she urged for integrity, trust and transparency for voters.

Following Yousaf's resignation in April 2024, Forbes was touted as a potential candidate to succeed him in the 2024 SNP leadership election. She announced the following day that she was "seriously considering" running. On 2 May 2024, Forbes announced she would not be a candidate for the SNP Leadership at this time, and backed John Swinney for the role. Swinney announced Forbes would receive a significant role in his government if elected.

== Deputy First Minister (2024–2026) ==
=== Nomination ===
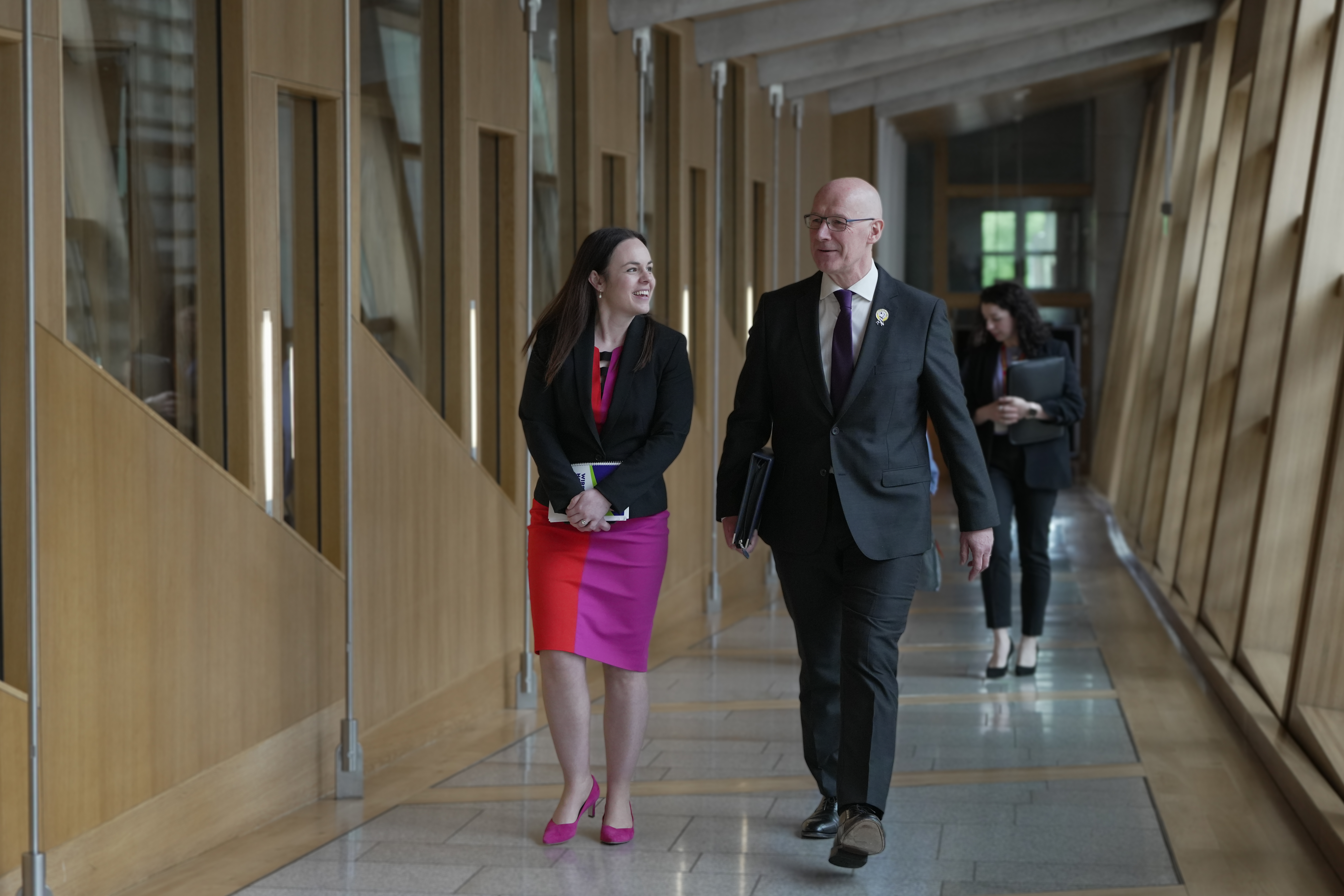
Forbes with John Swinney

Following Swinney's pledge to have Forbes in a significant role in cabinet, she was later appointed the position of Deputy First Minister in the Swinney government on 8 May 2024. During Swinney's first First Minister's Questions since becoming First Minister, Forbes was criticised by the Scottish Greens for her views on LGBT rights, gay marriage and abortion. Co-leader of the Scottish Greens, Patrick Harvie, used his parliamentary question time to address Swinney and his decision to appoint Forbes as Deputy First Minister.

In his statement to parliament, Harvie claimed that Swinney had given the "second most powerful job in government to someone who has opposed LGBT people’s legal equality, who has expressed judgemental attitudes against abortion, and who has even expressed the view that people who have families without being married are doing something wrong". He further added "is this the Scottish government’s vision for the future of Scotland - taking us back to the repressive values of the 1950s?". In response, Swinney told Harvey that he "wants to lead a modern, dynamic and diverse Scotland".

After leaving the chamber, Forbes was asked about the criticism her appointment had received from the Scottish Greens, where she stated that she was "here to support the first minister and together we serve all communities in Scotland as we further and progress the rights of every community in Scotland, and I look forward to doing my part in achieving the government's aims in that regard".

Following the results of the 2024 United Kingdom general election which saw the SNP win 9 out of 57 Scottish Westminster parliamentary seats, Forbes admitted that it was a "difficult night" for the SNP, and publicly endorsed John Swinney as SNP leader moving forward, stating that she supported Swinney to improve the SNP's reputation for "competence and integrity".

=== Cabinet Secretary for Economy and Gaelic ===
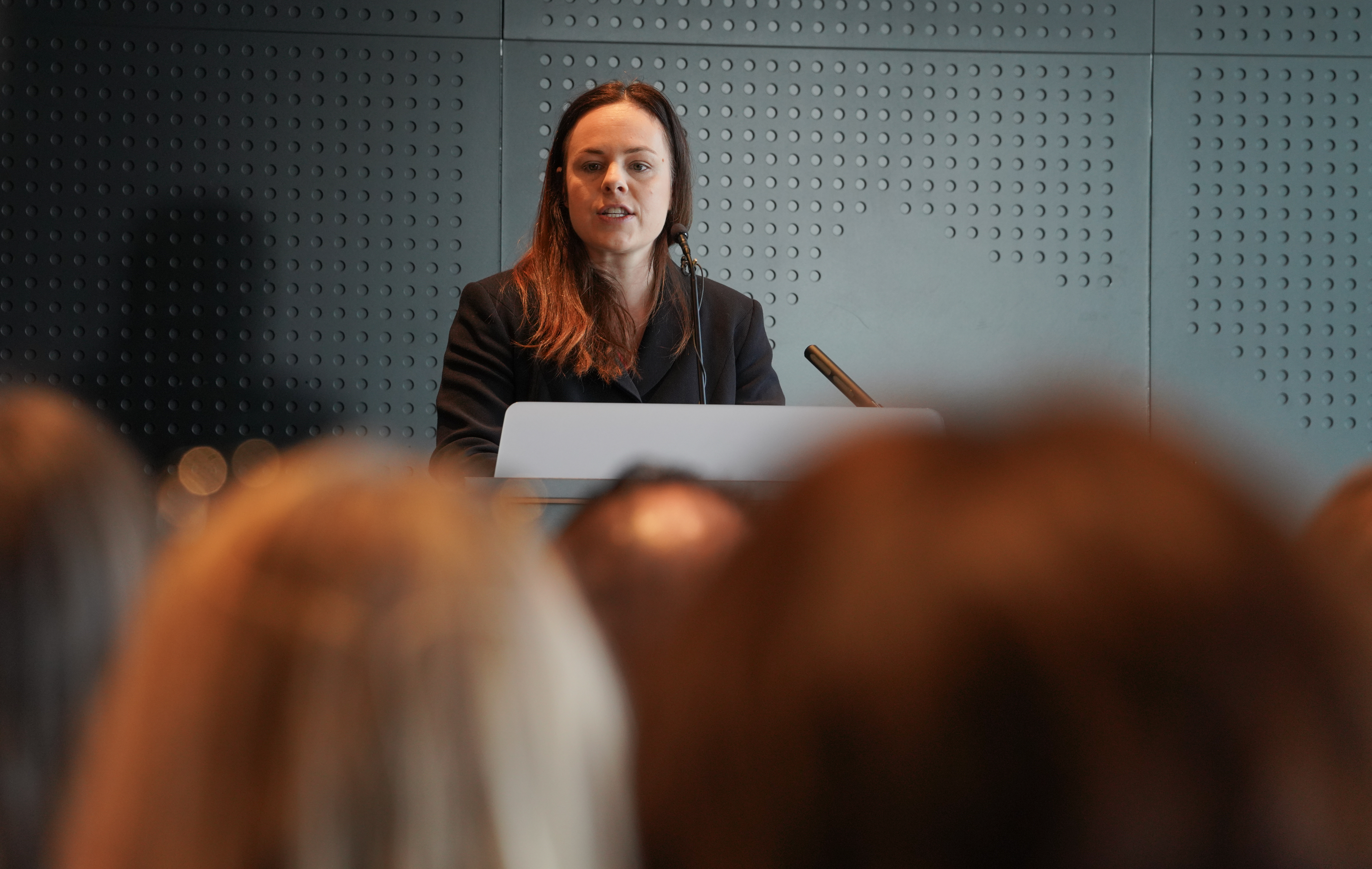
Forbes at Buchanan Wharf in Glasgow during a speech on realising Scotland's economic potential

Forbes was additionally appointed by Swinney as Cabinet Secretary for Economy and Gaelic, and was approved by Parliament on 9 May 2024. Her responsibilities for the economy brief include the public corporations of the Scottish Government including Scottish Enterprise, Highlands and Islands Enterprise, South of Scotland Enterprise, the Scottish National Investment Bank, Glasgow Prestwick Airport, Ferguson Marine, BiFab and Caledonian MacBrayne. As Cabinet Secretary for Economy and Gaelic, Forbes is supported by both the Minister for Business, Trade, Tourism and Enterprise and Minister for Employment and Investment.

As Cabinet Secretary for Gaelic, Forbes announced in October 2024 that the Scottish Government would invest £150,000 for several Scottish Gaelic projects and was highly supportive of the establishment of a new Scottish Gaelic language centre in Inverness. Forbes claimed that the new centre in Inverness provided the opportunity for Scottish Gaelic speakers to "communicate without the fear of using English" and announced a £370,000 investment from the Scottish Government for the centre.

=== Progressive taxation ===
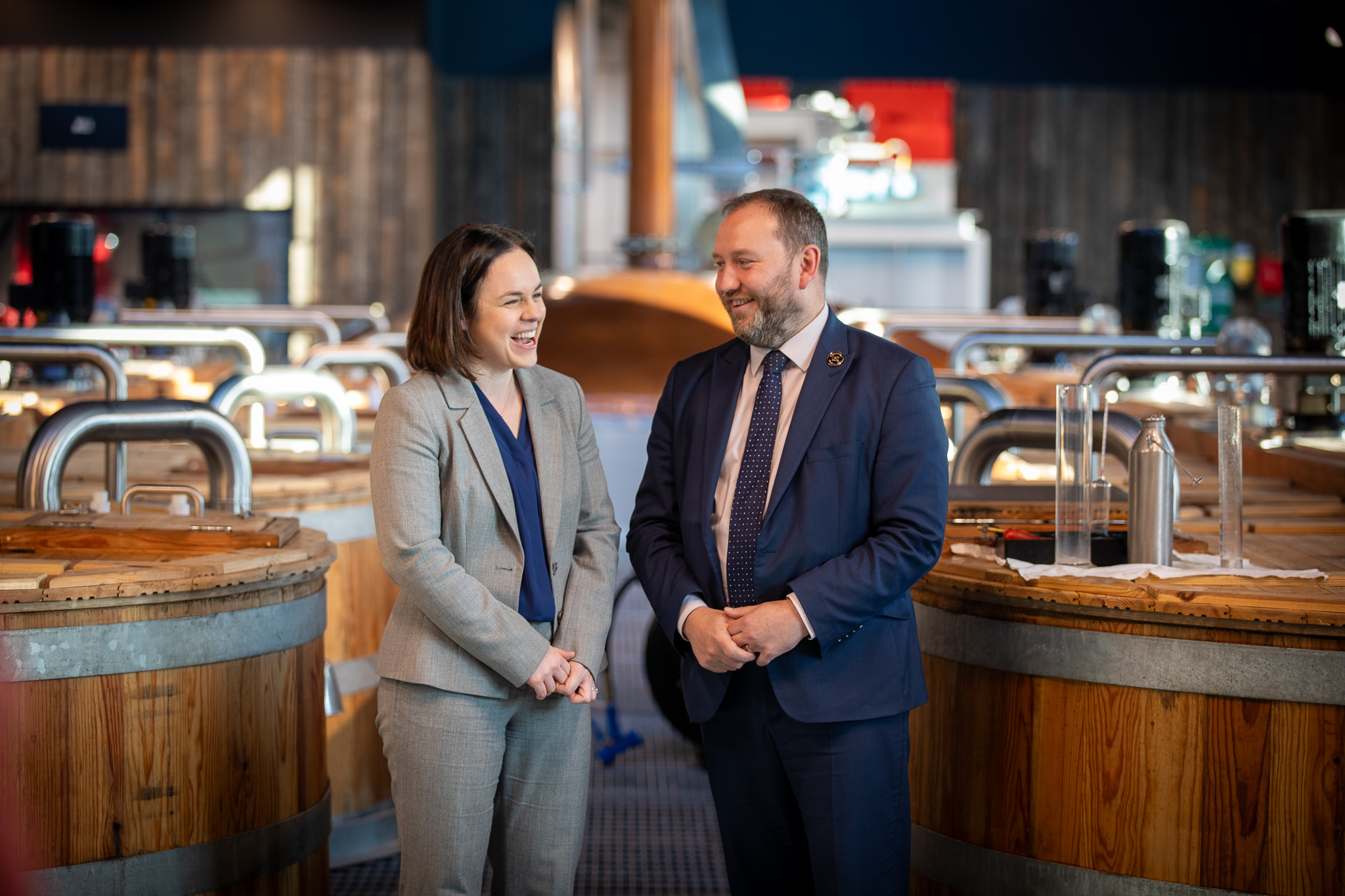
Forbes with Secretary of State for Scotland, Ian Murray, at the signing of the Falkirk and Grangemouth Growth Deal, November 2024

In June 2024, Forbes, as the Cabinet Secretary for Economy and Gaelic said that the policy for a progressive taxation system in Scotland was being kept "under review" following suggestions that the policy was discouraging taxpayers and new workers to location or retain business in Scotland. Speaking to Holyrood, Forbes dismissed such claims, using data from HM Revenue and Customs (HMRC) which showed that "just over 4,000 more people have come to Scotland than have left". She advocated that "people choose to immigrate to Scotland for a whole host of reasons and it’s very reductionist to assume people purely make decisions on income tax".

=== Foreign immigration policy ===
Following the landslide victory for the Labour Party at the 2024 United Kingdom general election, Forbes confirmed that she would be "pushing" the UK Government and new Prime Minister Keir Starmer on a separate foreign immigration policy for Scotland. She claimed in an interview that a separate foreign immigration policy for Scotland was "one of the big asks from the business community, and one of the big asks from the social care sector for a different immigration policy for Scotland", further adding that there was "far more positive rhetoric here in Scotland about immigration".

First Minister John Swinney and Prime Minister Keir Starmer met for the first time on 6 July 2024 at Bute House in Edinburgh. When asked whether the issue of a separate immigration policy for Scotland was discussed, Forbes did not confirm nor deny whether such an issue was discussed between the two governments.

=== Infrastructure ===
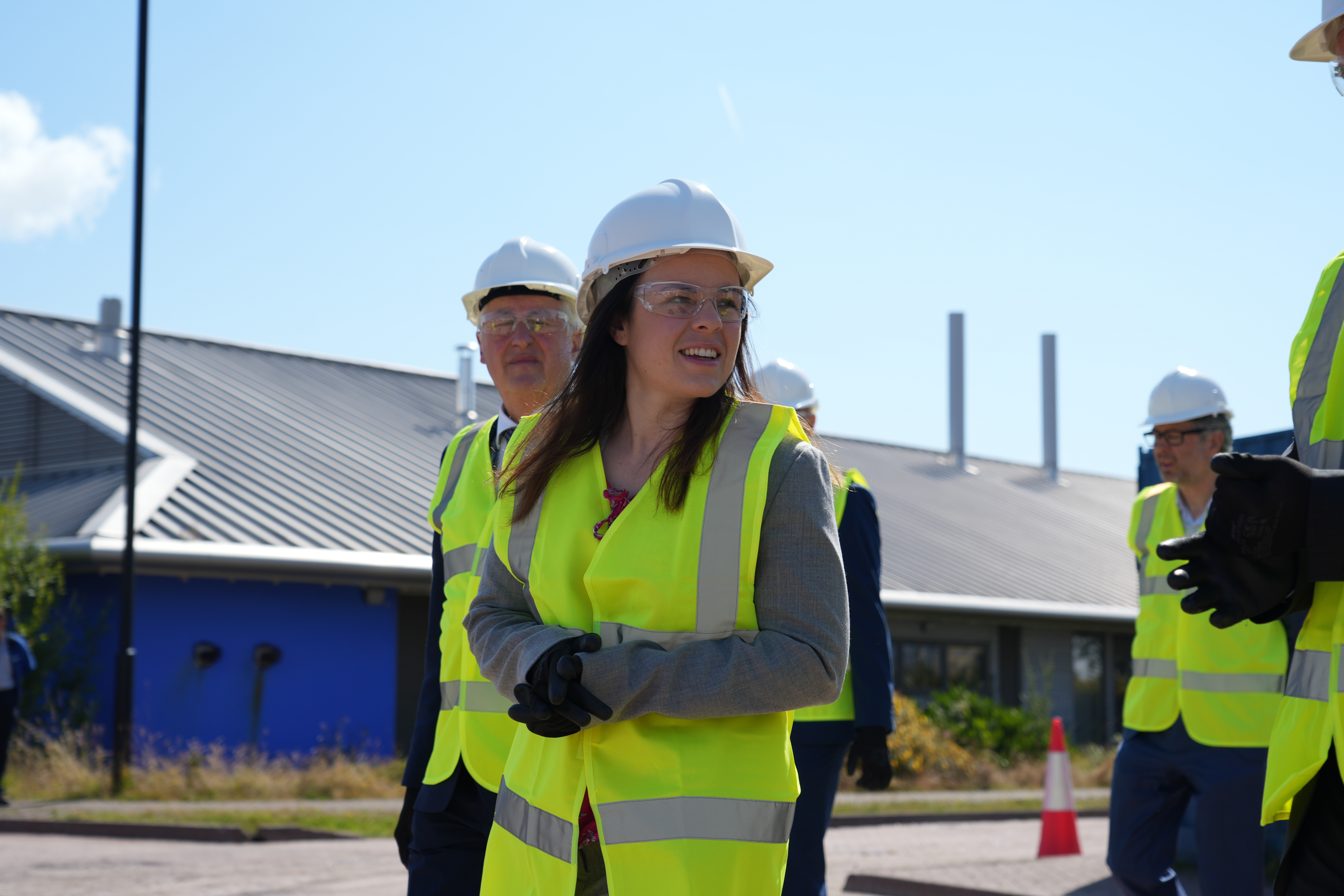
Forbes visiting University Human Sciences, July 2024

In October 2024, Forbes announced that the Scottish Government would provide £10 million in investment to allow the creation for a new walking path between Moffat and Berwick-upon-Tweed. The investment from the Scottish Government would be a boost to the already invested £25 million of public investment. Forbes said that the creation of the project would boost tourism in the south of the country, particularly in the Scottish Borders, highlighting that the project was an "ambitious programme" which will "capitalise on assets which will allow opportunities to further grow, develop and showcase what the region has to offer". The project is scheduled for completion in 2028.

=== Aerospace industry ===
Scotland appointed its first space envoy in October 2024, and in November 2024, Forbes highlighted the importance of the space industry in Scotland, stating that the sector is "strategically important to Scotland’s economy and we have all the key elements to be internationally competitive".

=== Foreign affairs ===
In October 2025, Forbes travelled to Canada to promote Scottish-Canada trade. She visited the province of Nova Scotia.

=== 2026 election ===
On 4 August 2025, Forbes announced that she would be stepping down as an MSP at the 2026 election. In a letter to Swinney, she said: "I am in no doubt about the scale of my duties as a local representative, an activist and campaigner, and a government minister. Quite rightly, this job entails long days far from home, constant attention and total dedication. As I consider the upcoming election and the prospects of another term, I have concluded that I do not wish to seek re-election and miss any more of the precious early years of family life." She later recounted that, since November 2024, she began to feel "really unsatisfied with the conflict between being a good mum and member of my family and being decent at my job." During a family visit to India in the summer of 2025, where she saw orphaned slum children, it solidified her decision to step down from politics. Swinney subsequently paid tribute to Forbes, saying: "I pay tribute to Kate for her invaluable contribution to public life over the last ten years. The challenges of frontline politics are considerable, and I understand the decision she has made although I wish it was not the case." Fergus Ewing, a former SNP minister, and the MSP for neighbouring Inverness and Nairn, said that the party had "lost the best leader it never had but should have chosen."

== Political positions ==
Forbes has widely been described as socially and economically conservative, in contrast with the generally socially liberal policies of the SNP.

During her leadership campaign, Forbes received scrutiny of her religious and socially conservative views on abortion and LGBT rights. In an interview with STV News, she criticised the "illiberal" debate about her religious views and questioned the meaning of liberalism, stating "have we become so illiberal that we cannot have these discussions? Because if some people are beyond the pale then those are dark and dangerous days for Scotland."

=== Scottish independence ===
As a member of the SNP, she supports Scottish independence. During the 2021 Scottish Parliament election, Forbes told business leaders she wanted a second Scottish independence referendum to be held once the "immediate impact" of the pandemic was over. She has called for a restart of the SNP's independence strategy. She has considered Sturgeon's proposal of using a parliamentary election as a de facto referendum to be a way to apply pressure on the UK government to grant permission to hold a formal referendum "rather than it being necessarily a referendum in and of itself". She said she wanted to achieve independence by delivering economic growth. At the first hustings, Forbes said she would seek the "legal powers to hold a referendum" on independence within three months of the new UK general election.

In the 2023 SNP leadership election, Forbes was the only one of the three candidates to share the official party position that the British monarchy should remain head of state in an independent Scotland, though she said that she found the issue to be of little importance.

=== Economic policy ===
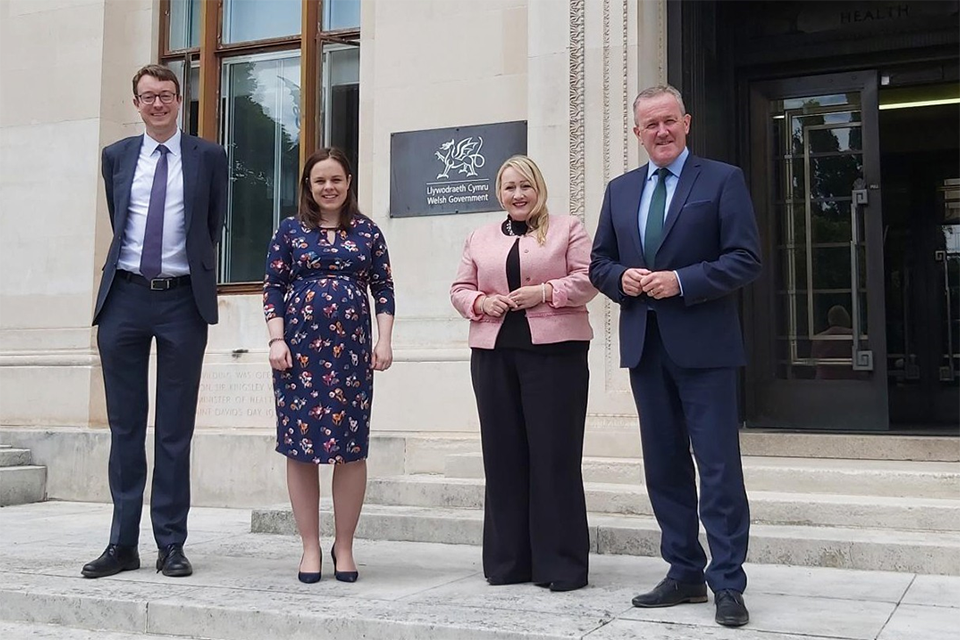
Forbes with Simon Clarke, Rebecca Evans, and Conor Murphy at the Finance Interministerial Standing Committee in Cardiff, July 2022

In 2018, Forbes was a member of the Sustainable Growth Commission, a blueprint of the economic policy and currency for an independent Scotland. The commission proved unpopular among many left-wing SNP members for its embrace of liberal economics. The Institute for Fiscal Studies (IFS) stated it would "further austerity under the SNP Sustainable Growth Commission's plans", while Common Weal, a left-wing pro-independence think tank, described it as shifting the Scottish economy to the right. Forbes supported the proposed currency arrangement of 'sterlingisation', which would mean an independent Scotland would not benefit from the central bank quantitative easing, a monetary policy of massive borrowing programmes during times of economic crisis.

As finance secretary, she stressed the need for more progressive taxation in order to tackle inequality and support economic growth. In March 2022, Forbes launched a report outlining Scotland's National Strategy for Economic Transformation, which is her plan to improve Scotland's economy over the following 10 years.

In her official manifesto, Forbes put eradicating poverty and promoting economic growth at the heart of her policy. OpenDemocracy claimed her economic agenda was "dangerous" and compared her economic policy to that of George Osborne and David Cameron, who oversaw a large-scale austerity programme in the early 2010s. Forbes stated the Scottish Government's proposed deposit return scheme would cause "economic carnage".

=== Social issues ===
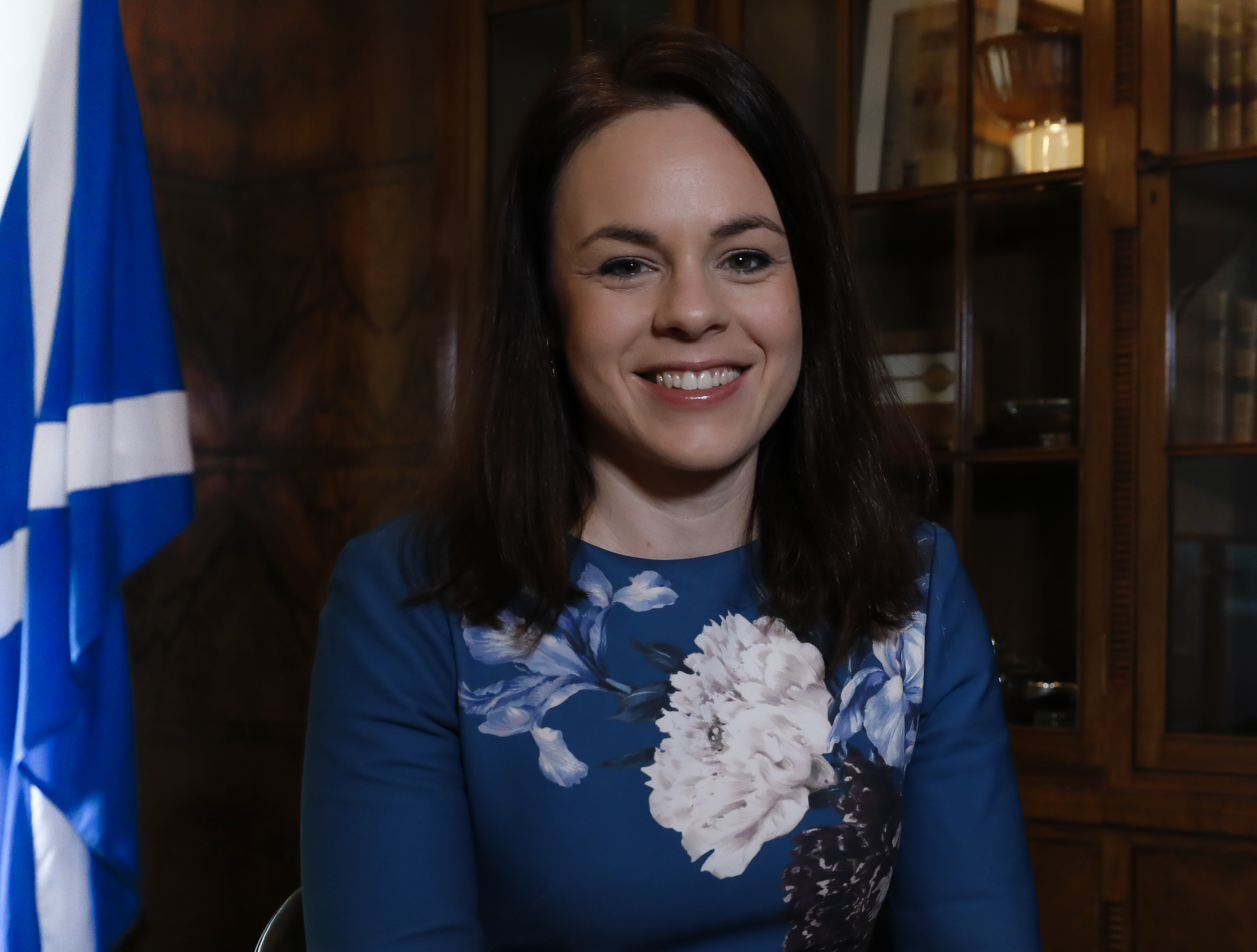
Forbes in 2019, following her appointment as Public Finances & Digital Economy Minister

In 2018, Forbes made a pro-life statement at a prayer breakfast, saying that the treatment of the unborn is a "measure of true progress" one day after a Westminster debate on abortion. In 2023, she said she "couldn’t conceive of having an abortion" herself, however, she "wouldn’t change the law as it stands". Forbes supports buffer zones for abortion clinics as she has said that women should not "be subjected to fear and harassment".

Forbes has stated that she is opposed to sex before marriage and to childbirth before marriage, considering it "wrong according to [her] faith"; however, she stated that "the birth of a child should still be celebrated". Forbes also stated that others have the choice to do so, as "In a free society you can do what you want".

On 20 February 2023, Forbes stated that if she had been an elected MSP in Holyrood when same-sex marriage was legalised in Scotland in 2014 she would have voted against the measure. However, in the same interview she clarified that she would not attempt to reverse existing same-sex marriage laws in Scotland.

Forbes has stated that she believes that a trans woman is a "biological male who identifies as a woman". She said a "rapist cannot be a woman" and that Isla Bryson, a transgender woman who was convicted of raping of two women prior to her gender transition, is a "man". However, in 2024 she said she supports the Gender Recognition Reform (Scotland) Bill, noting that "the first minister has been absolutely clear that the Scottish government intends to promote, to protect and to enhance the rights of every LGBT person in Scotland, and I wholeheartedly endorse that position."

In April 2019, Forbes was one of 15 SNP politicians who signed a public letter calling on the Scottish Government to delay its manifesto commitment to reform the Gender Recognition Act in Scotland. In January 2022, she told The Times that her position had not changed, that the Scottish Government should not rush to change the "definition of male and female" and said the Scottish Government "risked creating bad law". In the same month, Forbes signed off the proposed bill in a Scottish Cabinet meeting and when later asked why she did so despite her concerns she refused to answer. She did not participate in the final vote on the Gender Recognition Reform (Scotland) Bill in December 2022 due to being on maternity leave. She later stated that she would not have supported the bill.

== Electoral history ==
=== 2016 Scottish parliamentary elections ===
2016 Scottish Parliament election: Skye, Lochaber and Badenoch
Party	Candidate	Votes	%	±%
SNP	Kate Forbes	17 362	47.6	▲1.4
Liberal Democrats	Angela MacLean	8,319	22.8	▼7.7
Conservative	Robbie Munro	5,887	16.1	▲7.2
Labour	Linda Stewart	3,821	10.5	▼2.4
Independent	Ronnie Campbell	1,116	3.1	▲1.6
Majority		9,043	24.8	▲9.1
Turnout		36,644	61.5	▲5.3
SNP hold		Swing	▲4.6	

=== 2021 Scottish parliamentary elections ===
2021 Scottish Parliament election: Skye, Lochaber and Badenoch
Party	Candidate	Votes	%	±%
SNP	Kate Forbes	24,192	56.1	▲8.5
Conservative	Jamie Halcro Johnston	8,331	19.3	▲3.2
Liberal Democrats	Denis Rixson	6,778	15.7	▼7.1
Labour	John Erskine	3,855	8.9	▼1.6
Majority		15,861	36.8	▲12.0
Turnout		43,374	68.7	▲7.2
SNP hold		Swing	▲5.9	

== Personal life ==
Forbes is a fluent Gaelic speaker. She has made speeches in Gaelic at the Scottish Parliament.

She has been married to Alasdair "Ali" MacLennan since 29 July 2021. They were married in Dingwall, at Dingwall & Strathpeffer Free Church of Scotland. Forbes has three step-daughters, MacLennan’s children with his first wife, who died in October 2014. The couple's first child together, a daughter, was born in August 2022.

Forbes is a Christian, and is a member of the Free Church of Scotland. In a BBC interview, Forbes stated that she has never tried to hide her faith, calling it "essential to my being", and argued that it does not affect her ability to serve all her constituents, saying "I have a duty to represent them" and that being honest about her faith is an important matter.

She joined the British American Project in 2023.

== Notes ==
Scottish Parliament
Preceded by Dave Thompson	Member of the Scottish Parliament for Skye, Lochaber and Badenoch; 2016–2026	Succeeded by Andrew Baxter
Political offices
Preceded by Derek Mackay as Cabinet Secretary for Finance, Economy and Fair Work	Cabinet Secretary for Finance and the Economy; 2020–2023	Succeeded by Shona Robison as Cabinet Secretary for Finance
