= Charlotte Street Partners =

Scottish strategic communications consultancy

Charlotte Street Partners Limited
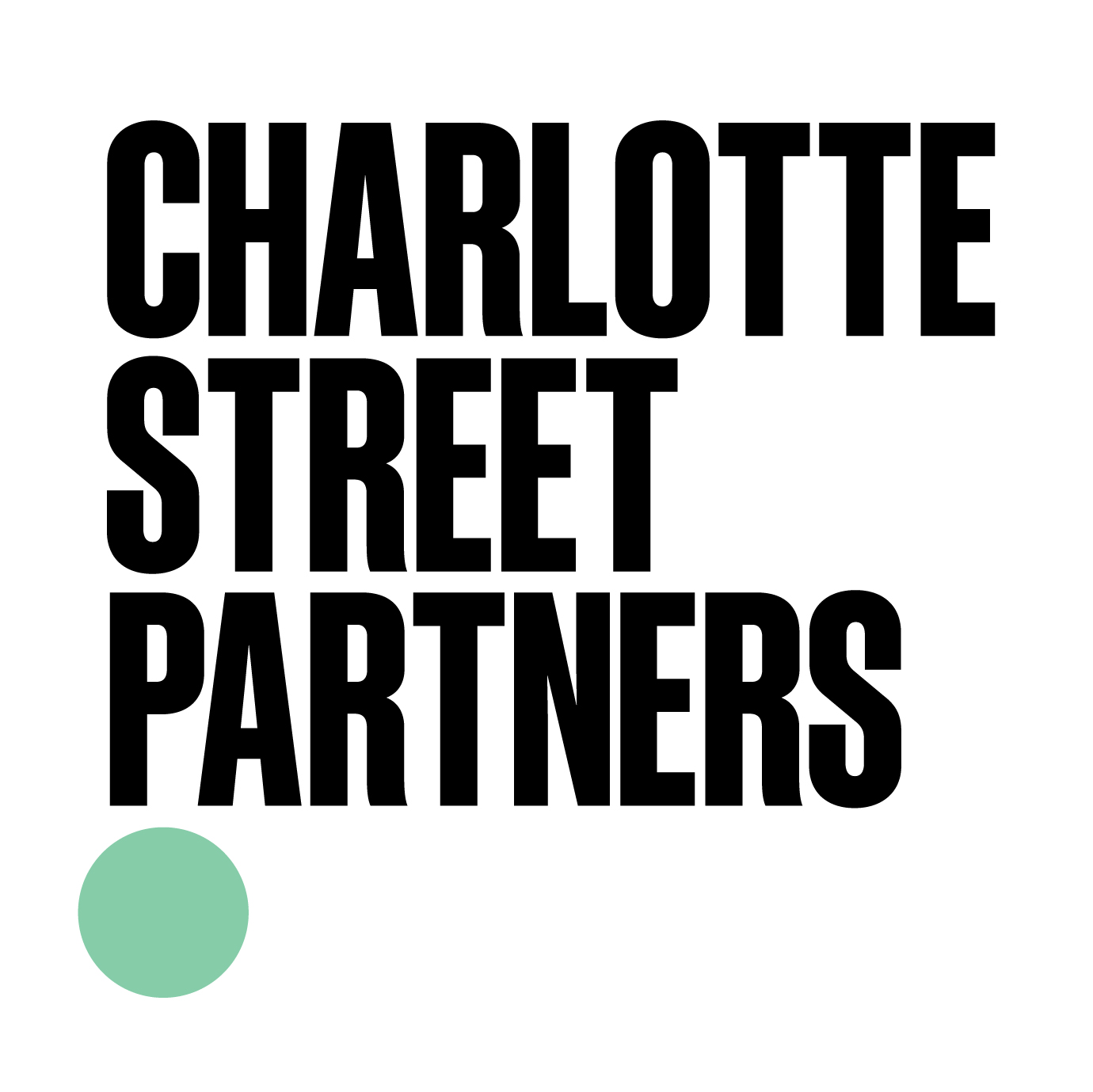
- Industry: Communications
- Founded: 2014
- Key people: Andrew Wilson (Co-founder); Malcolm Robertson (Co-founder)
- Services: Public Relations
- Website: charlottestreetpartners.com

Charlotte Street Partners Limited is a strategic communications consultancy, based in Edinburgh, that launched in January 2014. The consultancy provides advice to businesses, organisations and individuals.

The founding partners were Andrew Wilson, a former MSP and previously the head of group communications at Royal Bank of Scotland (RBS) and Malcolm Robertson, former BAA communications director. The founders had been identified as the top faces to look out for in 2014, and the formation of the consultancy described as “the biggest PR launch in Scotland for some time”.

Chris Deerin, former political editor of the Daily Record and head of comment for The Daily Telegraph; and Sharon Nimmo, formerly a business journalist with Scotland on Sunday were also partners but have since left. Kevin Pringle joined as a partner in 2015, having previously been the strategic communications director for the Scottish National Party (SNP). In January 2015, the firm announced they had hired David Gaffney from RBS as an associate partner in its Edinburgh office. A further associate partner joined, Robert Ballantyne, who had formerly been deputy chairman at financial PR agency Cardew Group.

In December 2015, the firm announced that Jo Nove, would become an associate partner. Five months later Nove was made a partner and was given responsibility for healthcare.

The board of Directors of the consultancy include Roland Rudd and James Murgatroyd, founder/chairman and Managing Partner respectively of Finsbury strategic consultancy, and MT Rainey, a creative industries leader and entrepreneur.

Their client list includes FirstGroup, the Scottish multinational transport company.

== Frame Creative PR ==
In late 2014, collaboration with Frame Creative, an advertising and digital agency, led to the launch of a new consumer PR business, Frame Creative PR.
