= Hannah Mary Goodlad =

Scottish politician (born 1990)

Hannah Mary Goodlad MSP
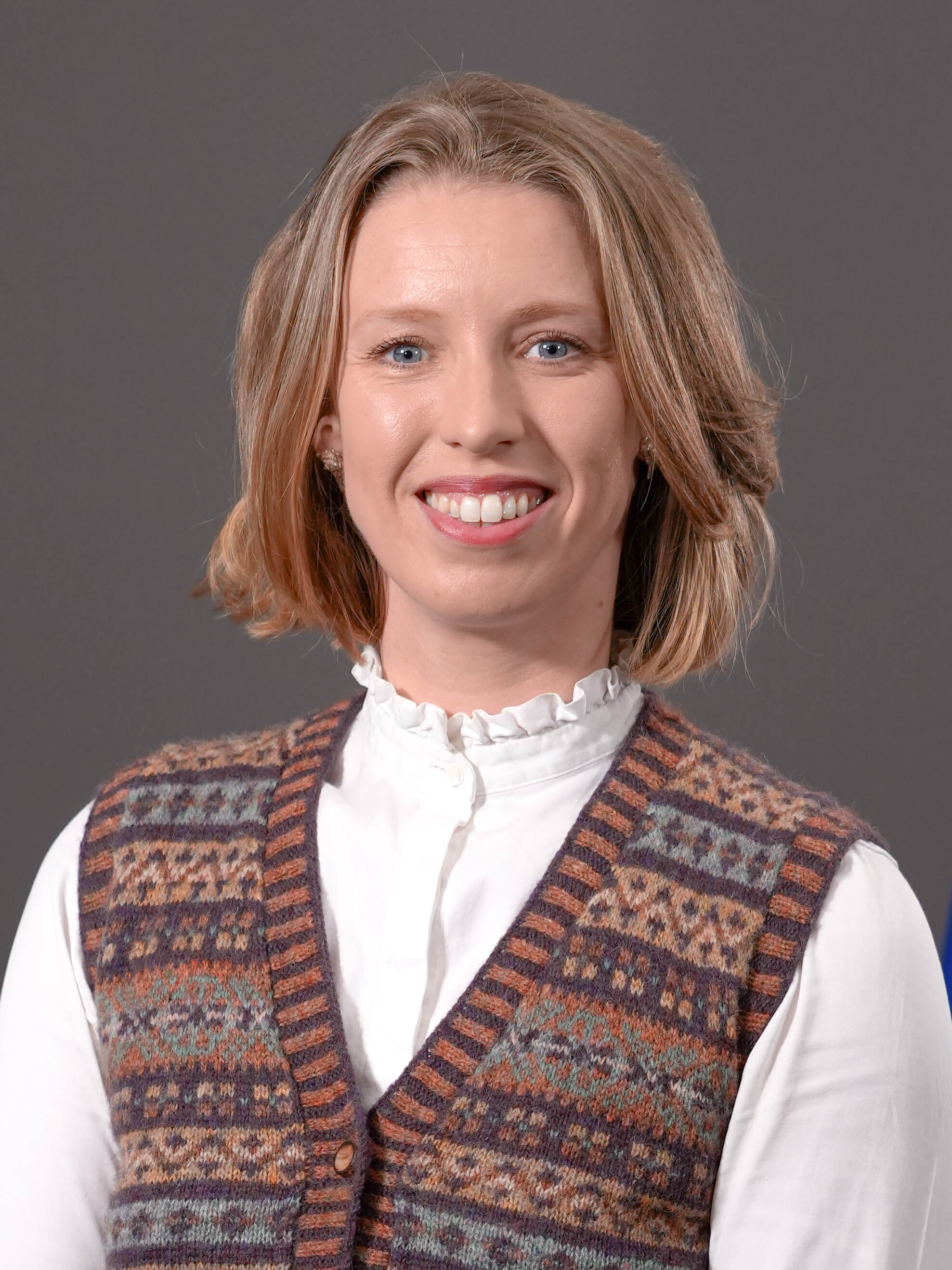
- Official portrait, 2026

Minister for Public Finance
- Incumbent
- Assumed office 21 May 2026
- First Minister: John Swinney
- Preceded by: Ivan McKee

Member of Scottish Parliament for Shetland Islands
- Incumbent
- Assumed office 7 May 2026
- Preceded by: Beatrice Wishart
- Majority: 1,517 (13.2%)

Personal details
- Born: Hannah Mary Goodlad; 12 May 1990 (age 36) Lerwick, Shetland, Scotland
- Party: Scottish National Party
- Spouse: Callum Scott
- Education: Imperial College London; University of Glasgow

Hannah Mary Goodlad (born 12 May 1990) is a Scottish politician. A member of the Scottish National Party, she has served as Minister for Public Finance since 20 May 2026. She has been the Member of the Scottish Parliament (MSP) for the Shetland Islands since 8 May 2026.

== Early life ==
Hannah Mary Goodlad was born in the Gilbert Bain Hospital, Lerwick. She is the daughter of John Goodlad, a former chief executive officer of the Shetland Fishermen's Association who in the 1980s stood as a candidate for the Shetland Movement; and Wilma Goodlad, who is the director of the Shetland branch of Samaritans and is a trustee of the Fishermen's Mission. Hannah Mary has a younger sister Johanna.

As a child Goodlad took part in Highland dancing through the Shetland School of Dancing.

Goodlad attended Glasgow University where she studied geology and chemistry, then studied in London for a masters degree.

== Energy industry ==
Goodlad has worked in a number of roles within the energy industry, including at Statoil/Equinor, and the Energy Institute.

== Political career ==
=== 2026 Scottish Parliament election ===
Goodlad's intention to stand as a candidate for the SNP in the Shetland constituency was noted in local media in March 2025, and she was confirmed as the SNP candidate by 7 May 2025. Her campaign featured regular videos posted on social media, a series of letters published in local news media, a visit to the Faroe Islands, the publication of a Shetland-specific manifesto, as well as participation in a number of hustings. First Minister of Scotland and leader of the SNP John Swinney made three trips to Shetland during her campaign. Goodlad received a number of endorsements from Shetland constituents which were published in the lead up to the election.

Goodlad won the seat. Her main opponent was the Scottish Liberal Democrats candidate Emma Macdonald, political leader of the Shetland Islands Council. Goodlad secured 5,453 votes (47.5% vote share) compared to Macdonald's 3,936 (34.3%). The Liberal Democrats had not lost Shetland in any election (Scottish Parliament or Westminster) since 1950.

=== Minister for Public Finance ===
On 20 May 2026 Goodlad was appointed the Minister for Public Finance, a junior ministerial role. Prior to Goodlad, the last Shetland MSP to hold a position in government was Liberal Democrat Tavish Scott when he was Minister for Transport and Telecommunications from 2005-2007.

In October 2026 she dedicated £11,000 of public money to hire for the role of "artist in residence" for her team, which led to criticism in some publications and by other parties.

== Personal life ==
Goodlad is married to Callum Scott. Both are directors of Haar Sauna Ltd, a mobile sauna business.

Goodlad was the Church of Scotland's National Youth Assembly Moderator.

Goodlad is a committee member of Shetland ForWirds.

Scottish Parliament
Preceded by Beatrice Wishart	Member of the Scottish Parliament for Shetland Islands; 2026–present	Incumbent
