= Minister for Public Finance (Scotland) =

Junior ministerial post in the Scottish Government

- Scottish Gaelic: Ministear an Ionmhais Phoblaich

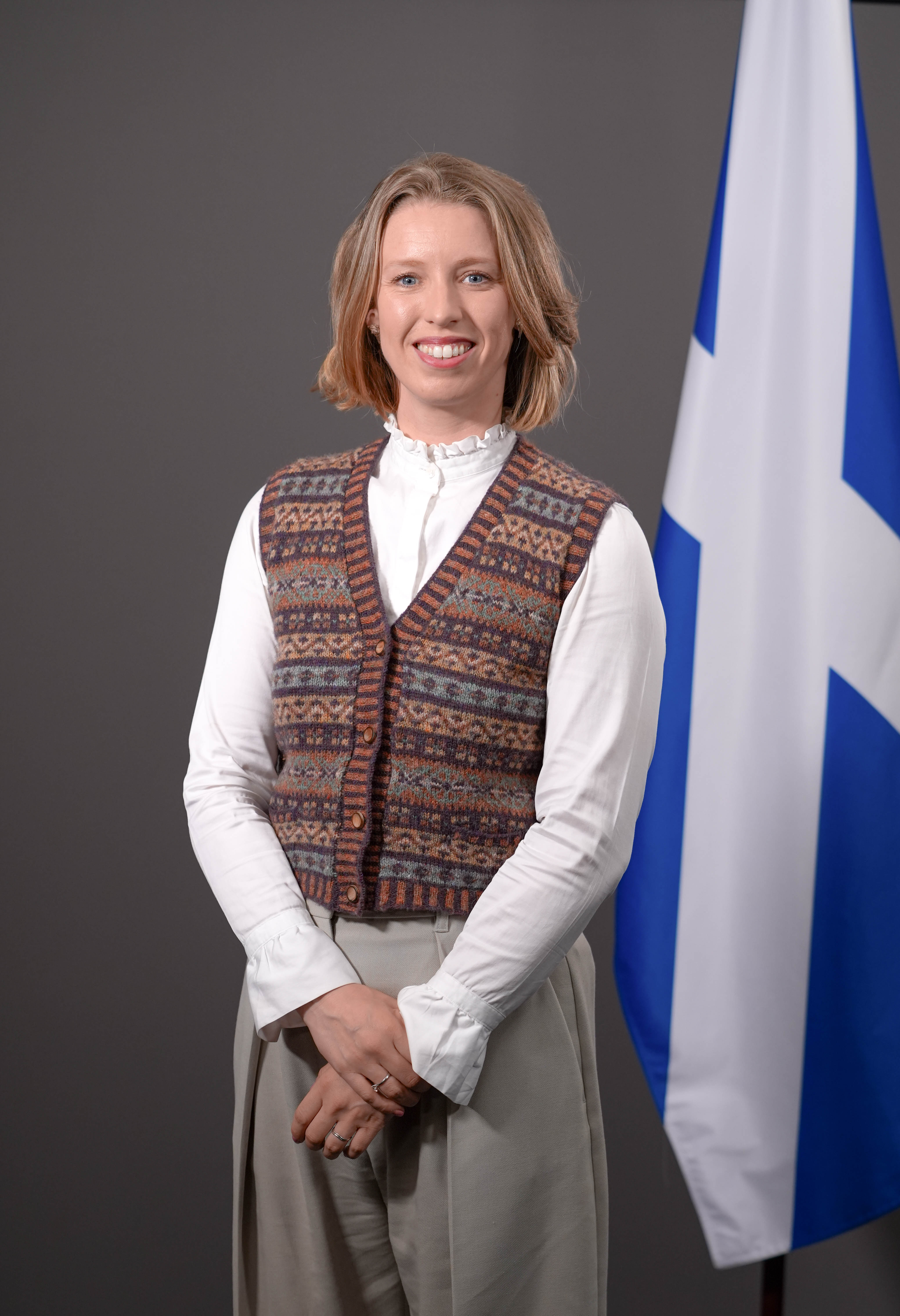
- Incumbent; Hannah Mary Goodlad since 21 May 2026
- Style: Minister (within parliament); Public Finance Minister (informal); Scottish Public Finance Minister (outwith Scotland)
- Member of: Scottish Parliament; Scottish Government
- Reports to: Scottish Parliament
- Seat: Edinburgh
- Appointer: First Minister
- Inaugural holder: Kate Forbes Minister for Public Finance and Digital Economy
- Formation: 27 June 2018
- Salary: £106,185 per annum (2024) (including £72,196 MSP salary)
- Website: www.gov.scot

The Minister for Public Finance is a Junior ministerial post in the Scottish Government. As a result, the Minister does not attend the Scottish Cabinet.

The post was created in June 2018 as the Minister for Public Finance and Digital Economy, with Kate Forbes its first holder. The incumbent Minister, Hannah Mary Goodlad supports the Cabinet Secretary for Finance and Local Government, who is a full member of cabinet.

== Overview ==
The Minister for Public Finance has responsibility for:

Specific responsibilities are:

- planning
- non-domestic rates (NDR) and NDR business engagement
- public sector pensions / Scottish Public Pensions Agency
- Registers of Scotland
- statutory debt management and debt relief, diligence and Accountant in Bankruptcy
- consumer advocacy and advice
- Consumer Scotland

Public finance

- budget revisions
- outturn

Public service reform

- public sector productivity and efficient government
- public bodies policy
- civil service transformation,
- government procurement and shared services
- estates and property

Community empowerment

- Local Governance Review
- 20 minute neighbourhoods (cross-government delivery)

== List of office holders ==
The incumbent is Hannah Mary Goodlad, who was approved by the Scottish Parliament on 21 May 2026.

=== Minister for Public Finance and Digital Economy ===
Name	Portrait	Entered office	Left office	Party	First Minister
Kate Forbes		27 June 2018	17 February 2020	Scottish National Party	Nicola Sturgeon
=== Minister for Public Finance and Migration ===
Ben Macpherson		17 February 2020	19 May 2021	Scottish National Party	Nicola Sturgeon
=== Minister for Public Finance, Planning and Community Wealth ===
Tom Arthur		19 May 2021	29 March 2023	Scottish National Party	Nicola Sturgeon
=== Minister for Community Wealth and Public Finance ===
Tom Arthur		29 March 2023	8 May 2024	Scottish National Party	Humza Yousaf
=== Minister for Public Finance ===
Ivan McKee		9 May 2024	20 May 2026	Scottish National Party	John Swinney
Hannah Mary Goodlad		21 May 2026	Incumbent	Scottish National Party	John Swinney

== See also ==
- Scottish Parliament
