= Scottish National Investment Bank =

Scottish government-owned company

Scottish National Investment Bank plc
- Type: State-owned investment and development bank (Statutory corporation)
- Industry: Financial services
- Founded: November 2020
- Headquarters: Edinburgh, Scotland
- Key people: Al Denholm, Chief Executive; Willie Watt, Chairman
- Owner: Scottish Government
- Website: www.thebank.scot

The Scottish National Investment Bank is a Scottish publicly-owned investment and national development bank based in Edinburgh, Scotland. Although referred to as a bank, it does not do normal banking operations nor accepts deposits. The bank uses public money to fund commercial projects across Scotland with the hope that this seed capital will encourage further private investment, to help develop a fairer, more sustainable economy. £2 billion of taxpayers money is earmarked for the bank.

The bank is a public corporation, with the only shareholder being the Scottish Government. It reports to the Cabinet Secretary for Economy, Tourism and Transport.

== History ==
The bank was announced in September 2017 in the First Minister Nicola Sturgeon's 2017 Programme for Government.

Benny Higgins was appointed as a strategic adviser, to oversee the organisation launching. In February 2018 an implementation plan was launched.

Scottish National Investment Bank Act 2020
- Act of the Scottish Parliament
- Scottish Parliament
- Long title: An Act of the Scottish Parliament to require the establishment of the Scottish National Investment Bank and to make further provision in connection with that body.
- Citation: 2020 asp 3
- Introduced by: Derek Mackay MSP
- Territorial extent: Scotland

Dates
- Royal assent: 25 February 2020
- Commencement: 16 September 2020

Status: Current legislation

Text of statute as originally enacted

Text of the Scottish National Investment Bank as in force today (including any amendments) within the United Kingdom, from legislation.gov.uk.

The bill was introduced by Cabinet Secretary for Finance, Derek Mackay MSP. The Scottish National Investment Bank Act 2020 (asp 3) was passed by Parliament received royal assent in February 2020. The act legally obliged Scottish Ministers to establish a National Investment Bank for Scotland as both a public body as a publicly limited company, independent of the Scottish Government. The act states that "primary goal is to help Scotland transition to net-zero carbon emissions, while supporting small and medium-size enterprises." The bank was formally launched in November 2020.

In February 2022 Eilidh MacTaggart left the bank as Chief Executive. First Minister Nicola Sturgeon was questioned about the departure in the Scottish Parliament. The departure coincided with the publication of the Scottish Government's National Strategy for Economic Transformation which would direct the focus of future investments made by the bank. Ms MacTaggart subsequently insisted she left the bank for personal reasons, and received £117,500 having to work her notice period under the terms of her contract. In April 2023, Al Denholm was appointed Chief Executive.

As of May 2025, the bank had committed £712.7 million in investments.

== Portfolio ==
Date	Company	Sector	Value (GBP)	References
23 November 2020	M Squared Lasers	Quantum technology	12,500,000	
24 February 2021	PfP Capital	Mid-market rental housing	40,000,000	
27 July 2021	R3 IoT	IoT satellite connectivity	1,000,000	
29 July 2021	Forev	EV charging infrastructure	2,000,000	
11 August 2021	IndiNature	Natural fibre insulation	3,000,000	
17 August 2021	Gresham House Forestry Fund	Woodland creation	50,000,000	
7 September 2021	Nova Innovation	Net zero	6,400,000	
22 September 2021	Sunamp	Net zero	6,000,000	
15 November 2021	Iona Wind Partnership	Net zero	13,000,000	
3 December 2021	Strathcarron Homes	Housing	3,000,000	
7 January 2022	Lothian Broadband Group	Rural broadband	20,000,000	
18 January 2022	Highland Coast Hotels	Tourism	4,450,000	
28 January 2022	Aberdeen Harbour	Marine infrastructure	30,000,000	
31 March 2022	Travelnest	Tourism	3,000,000	
9 May 2022	Circularity Scotland	Deposit-return scheme	9,000,000	
9 May 2022	Elasmogen	Pharmaceutical industry	3,500,000	
4 July 2022	Orbital Marine Power	Renewable energy	4,000,000	
13 July 2022	pureLiFi	Telecommunications	10,000,000	
18 July 2022	Wavegarden Scotland	Surf technology	26,000,000	
5 September 2022	Trojan Energy	EV charging infrastructure	9,000,000	
October 2022	Orbex	Bio-fuel satellite launch	17,800,000	
November 2022	Social and Sustainable	Social housing	15,000,000	
December 2022	North Start Renewables	Renewable energy operations	50,000,000	
January 2023	PneumoWave	Biosensor technology	5,200,000	
March 2023	Utopi	Data analytics platform	5,000,000	
April 2023	Forrit	Cloud-based content	5,000,000	
April 2023	Verlume	Renewable energy	6,600,000	
October 2023	Cyacomb	Innovative technology	2,600,000	
October 2023	Par Equity	Innovative technology	6,600,000	
January 2024	Cumulus Oncology	Cancer treatment	9,000,000	
January 2024	Trojan Energy	On-street EV charging infrastructure	18,000,000	
January 2024	Aurora Energy Services	Training relating to green energy supply chain	20,000,000	
April 2024	Calcivis	Dental decay detection	4,000,000	
April 2024	EnteroBiotix	Biopharmaceuticals	6,000,000	
June 2024	FOR EV	EV charging infrastructure	10,000,000	
June 2024	iGii	Nanomaterial	4,000,000	
August 2024	Highland Broadband	Broadband network	10,000,000	
September 2024	ZeroAvia	Aircraft engines	20,000,000	
September 2024	Leap Automation (Leap AI)	Artificial intelligence robotics	7,900,000	
November 2024	DITT Construction	Housing	730,000	
February 2025	Pulpex	Packaging technology	10,000,000	
February 2025	Subsea Micropiles	Marine anchor system for large offshore construction projects	6,700,000	
April 2025	NCIMB	Microbiology services		

== See also ==
- List of national development banks
