= Kyckr =

Global business register

- Type: Private Company
- Industry: Business services
- Founded: 2007; 19 years ago in Ireland
- Headquarters: Sydney, Australia
- Key people: Steve Lamb (CEO); Rajarshi Ray (Chairman); Richard White (Owner)
- Products: Company registers for know your customer (KYC)
- Website: https://www.kyckr.com/

Kyckr is a business register to help with know your customer (KYC) processes for anti-money laundering regulations. It was established in Ireland, and was a publicly traded company on the Australian Securities Exchange with operations in Ireland and Australia. The company delisted on 07 November 2022, when it was acquired by Richard White.

== History ==
The company was established in Waterford, Ireland in 2007 by Ben Cronin and Rob Leslie.

The Financial Times reported that Kyckr had a net fall in income of AUS$3.45 million in 2017.

In 2018, Kyckr was a participant in the International AML & CTF Techsprint run by the UK Financial Conduct Authority, in conjunction with 12 International supervisory and law enforcement agencies

It was acquired by Australian technology businessman Richard White's private investment company in 2022.

In 2024, White transferred part ownership of the investment company to his wife, Zena Nasser, but her ultimate beneficial ownership (UBO) was not disclosed until months later. This caused concern in security circles as uncovering hidden UBOs is a core part of the Kyckr's services, with then CTO Rebecca Glover noting Nasser's "publicly reported criminal associations" as concerning for an anti-money laundering company.

In 2025 White dismissed Kathy Phelan as CEO, and Rebecca Glover as CTO, both of whom launched legal claims. Glover alleged that she was dismissed after objecting to concealing a high error rate in their software, and compliance issues from a potential buyer.

== Operations ==
The company provides data access technology for know your customer (KYC) in financial services and supply chain. It assists banks and other businesses to meet anti-terrorism finance, anti money laundering and other laws and regulations that require the identification of potential criminal money movement.

Kyckr's customers are primarily financial companies.
