= Net Zero Directorates =

Scottish government agency

The Scottish Government Net Zero Directorates are a group of Directorates of the Scottish Government. The group was created in July 2021, with Agriculture & Rural Economy, Marine (formerly known as Marine Scotland), Energy & Climate Change, Environment & Forestry, Transport Scotland, Forestry and Land Scotland and Scottish Forestry moving from the Economy Directorates.

The individual Directorates within the DG (Director-General) Net Zero family (the Net Zero Directorates) report to the Director-General, Andy Kerr.

== Ministers ==
There is no direct relationship between Ministers and the Directorates. However, the activities of the Directorates include those under the purview of the Cabinet Secretary for Climate Action and Energy, Gillian Martin MSP, the Cabinet Secretary for Transport, Fiona Hyslop MSP and the Cabinet Secretary for Rural Affairs, Land Reform and Islands Mairi Gougeon MSP. They are supported in their work by the Minister for Agriculture and Connectivity, Jim Fairlie MSP.

== Directorates ==
The overarching Scottish Government Directorates were preceded by similar structures called "Departments" that no longer exist (although the word is still sometimes erroneously used in this context). As an overarching unit, the Net Zero Directorates incorporate a number of individual Directorates entitled:

- Agriculture and Rural Economy Directorate
- Energy and Climate Change Directorate
- Environment and Forestry Directorate
- Marine Directorate (formerly known as Marine Scotland)
- Offshore Wind Directorate

== Agencies and other bodies ==
The Directorates are responsible for three agencies:

- Transport Scotland
- Forestry and Land Scotland
- Scottish Forestry

The Directorates also sponsor several non-departmental public bodies including:

- Cairngorms National Park Authority
- Crofting Commission
- Scottish Land Commission
- Scottish Food Commission
- Loch Lomond and the Trossachs National Park Authority
- James Hutton Institute
- Royal Botanic Garden Edinburgh
- Scottish Environment Protection Agency
- Quality Meat Scotland
- NatureScot
- Scottish Pubs Code Adjudicator

and share with the UK Government and other administrations in sponsorship of the Sea Fish Industry Authority, the Agriculture and Horticulture Development Board and the British Wool Marketing Board.

== History ==
Before the creation of the Net Zero Directorates in June 2021, some of these directorates were part of the Environment Directorates. Prior to 2007, the work had been carried out by the old Scottish Executive Environment and Rural Affairs Department (SEERAD).
