= Wildlife law in England and Wales =

Wildlife law in England and Wales is the law relating to the protection of wildlife in England and Wales. Much of existing UK law dates from pre-Victorian times. Wildlife was viewed as a resource to be used; phrases such as "game" or "sporting rights" appear. Public opinion is now much more in favour of protection of birds and mammals rather than the landowners’ interests.

== Scope ==
A "wild bird" is: ..."Any bird of a species which is ordinarily resident in or is a visitor to the European territory of any member state in a wild state but does not include poultry or, except in sections 5 and 16, any game bird." It is an offence to kill, injure, or take any wild bird, to have possession of a wild bird (alive or dead) or any part of a wild bird, to obstruct or prevent any wild bird from using its nest, to take or destroy a wild bird's egg, to have possession of a wild bird's egg or any part of an egg. It is also an offence to keep or confine a wild bird in a cage or other receptacle in which it cannot stretch its wings freely.

A "game bird" is a pheasant, ptarmigan, partridge, or grouse (or moor or heath game). Historically the bustard was also a game bird but this has been hunted to extinction in the UK.

A "specially protected wild animal" is: a badger, bat, wild cat, dolphin, dormouse, hedgehog, pine marten, otter, polecat, shrew or red squirrel.

The law defines certain other species as vermin and landowners are permitted (or, in the case of wild rabbits and grey squirrels, are required) to cull them.

== Enforcement ==
Police can, without warrant, on suspicion with reasonable cause of an offence under the Wildlife and Countryside Act 1981, stop and search; seize and detain evidence; or make an arrest.

Most wildlife crimes are crimes of strict liability. There is a general defence for well-intended welfare-related actions such as taking an injured animal for tending or treatment, or for the euthanasia of a seriously injured animal that has no chance of recovery.

Generally, proceedings must be brought within six months of the prosecutor coming into possession of evidence which, in his opinion, warrants proceedings. They may not be brought later than two years after the date of the offence. The maximum penalty for most wildlife crimes is six months' imprisonment and a fine of up to £5,000. The Court may also order the offender to pay or contribute towards the prosecution costs.

== History ==
=== Game laws ===
The history of wildlife management begins with the Game laws, which regulated the right to kill certain kinds of fish and other wild animals (game). In Britain game laws developed out of the forest laws, which in the time of the Norman kings were very oppressive. Under William the Conqueror, it was as great a crime to kill one of the king's deer as to kill one of his subjects. A certain rank and standing, or the possession of a certain amount of property, were for a long time qualifications indispensably necessary to confer upon any one the right of pursuing and killing game.

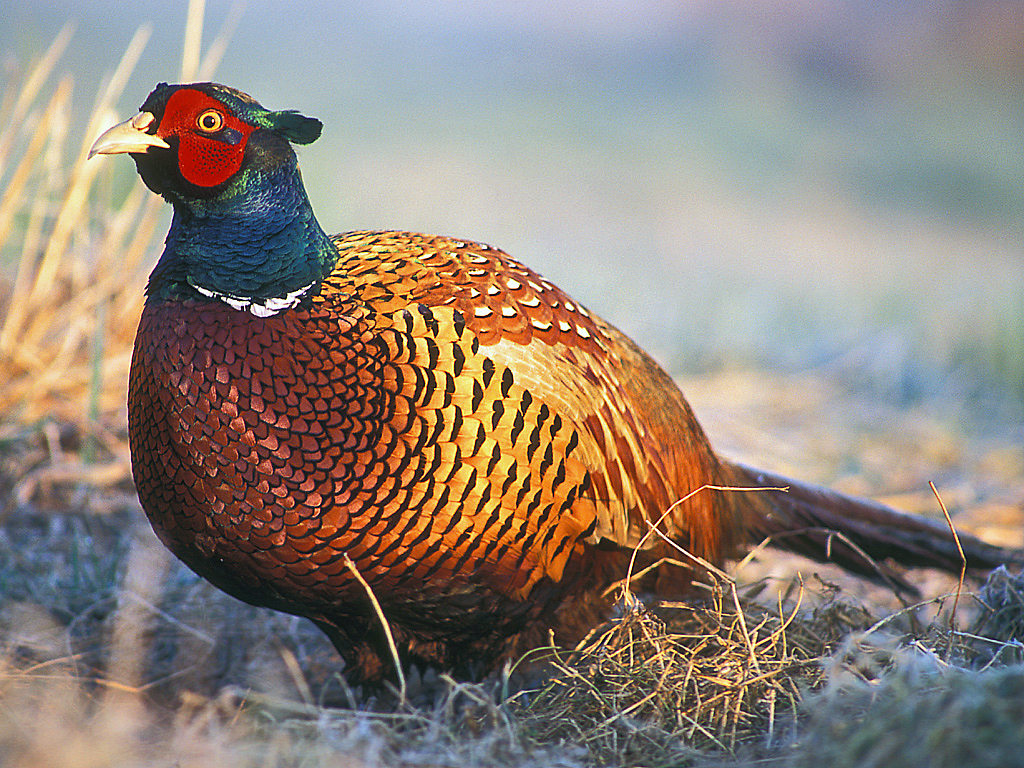
The Game Act 1831 protects game birds in England and Wales

The Game Act 1831 (1 & 2 Will. 4. c. 32) protected game birds by establishing close seasons when they could not be legally taken. The act made it lawful to take game only with the provision of a game licence and provided for the appointment of gamekeepers around the country.

=== Emergence of wildlife conservation ===
The late 19th century saw the passage of the first pieces of wildlife conservation legislation and the establishment of the first nature conservation societies. The Sea Birds Preservation Act 1869 was passed in Britain as the first nature protection law in the world after extensive lobbying from the Association for the Protection of Seabirds.

The Royal Society for the Protection of Birds was founded as the Plumage League in 1889 by Emily Williamson at her house in Manchester as a protest group campaigning against the use of great crested grebe and kittiwake skins and feathers in fur clothing. The group gained popularity and eventually amalgamated with the Fur and Feather League in Croydon to form the RSPB. The Society attracted growing support from the suburban middle-classes as well as support from many other influential figures, such as the ornithologist Professor Alfred Newton.

The National Trust formed in 1895 with the manifesto to "...promote the permanent preservation, for the benefit of the nation, of lands, ...to preserve (so far practicable) their natural aspect." On 1 May 1899, the Trust purchased two acres of Wicken Fen with a donation from the amateur naturalist Charles Rothschild, establishing the first nature reserve in Britain. Rothschild was a pioneer of wildlife conservation in Britain, and went on to establish many other nature reserves, such as one at Woodwalton Fen, near Huntingdon, in 1910. During his lifetime he built and managed his estate at Ashton Wold in Northamptonshire to maximise its suitability for wildlife, especially butterflies. Concerned about the loss of wildlife habitats, in 1912 he set up the Society for the Promotion of Nature Reserves, the forerunner of The Wildlife Trusts partnership.

During the society's early years, membership tended to be made up of specialist naturalists and its growth was comparatively slow. The first independent Trust was formed in Norfolk in 1926 as the Norfolk Naturalists Trust, followed in 1938 by the Pembrokeshire Bird Protection Society which after several subsequent changes of name is now the Wildlife Trust of South and West Wales and it was not until the 1940s and 1950s that more Naturalists' Trusts were formed in Yorkshire, Lincolnshire, Leicestershire and Cambridgeshire. These early Trusts tended to focus on purchasing land to establish nature reserves in the geographical areas they served.

== Statutes ==
This is a list of relevant statutes. Laws which have been fully repealed are not listed here.

Night Poaching Act 1828 and Night Poaching Act 1844

Game Act 1831 (1 & 2 Will. 4. c. 32)

Game Licences Act 1860

Poaching Prevention Act 1862

Ground Game Act 1880

Covers rabbits and hares.

Protection of Animals Act 1911

This act is now mostly repealed. An unrepealed section imposes an obligation on anyone setting spring snares to check them at least once a day.

Pests Act 1954

The Pests Act prohibits most kinds of spring traps. It also puts almost the whole of England and Wales (except the City of London, the Isles of Scilly and Skokholm Island) under a "rabbit clearance order" which puts a duty on land occupiers to take reasonable measures to kill wild rabbits on their land.

Theft Act 1968

This Act is mostly unrelated to wildlife, but contains a helpful paragraph: "Wild creatures, tamed or untamed, shall be regarded as property, but a person cannot steal a wild creature unless... it has been reduced into possession by or on behalf of another person".

Conservation of Seals Act 1970

Salmon and Freshwater Fisheries Act 1975

Animal Health Act 1981

This Act gives ministers strong powers to remove a threat to agriculture, except in the case of badgers or European Protected Species.

Wildlife and Countryside Act 1981

Prohibits the capture or killing of wildlife by means of self-locking snares, bows, crossbows, and explosives other than firearms ammunition.

Deer Act 1991

A consolidating Act from the previous Deer Acts.

Protection of Badgers Act 1992

Makes it an offence to use badger tongs, to dig for a badger, or to disturb it within its sett, or to release a dog into a sett.

Wild Mammals (Protection) Act 1996

Defines a wild mammal as one which is neither domestic nor captive. Makes it an offence to mutilate, kick, beat, nail or otherwise impale, stab, burn, stone, crush, drown, drag or asphyxiate any wild mammal with intent to inflict unnecessary suffering.

Hunting Act 2004

This was excluded from the Law Commission's consultation.

Animal Welfare Act 2006

Natural Environment and Rural Communities Act 2006

This puts a legal duty on public bodies to take biodiversity into account when exercising their functions.

Conservation of Habitats and Species Regulations 2010

== See also ==
- Wildlife and Natural Environment (Scotland) Act 2011
- Protection of Wild Mammals (Scotland) Act 2002
- Deer (Scotland) Act 1996

== Sources ==
- Law Commission: Wildlife Law: A Consultation Paper. London: The Stationery Office Limited, 2006. ISBN 978-0118405348
- Whittaker, Geoff (ed): Focus: Wildlife crimes in Farm Law #183 (Feb 2012). London: Informa UK Ltd. ISSN 1479-537X
- Whittaker, Geoff (ed): One Law for Wildlife? in Farm Law #189 (Sept 2013). London: Informa UK Ltd. ISSN 1479-537X
