= Environment Directorates =

Scottish Government Rural Affairs, Environment and Services Directorates

The Scottish Government Rural Affairs, Environment and Services Directorates were a group of civil service Directorates in the Scottish Government until a December 2010 re-organisation.

The Environment Directorates reported to the Director-General, Paul Gray.

A general concordat, drawn up in 1999, set out agreed frameworks for co-operation between the Environment Directorates and the United Kingdom government Department for Environment, Food and Rural Affairs and there is another specifically on the subject of genetically modified organisms.

After December 2010 many of the department's responsibilities became those of the Enterprise, Environment and Digital Directorates. This changed again to the Enterprise, Environment and Innovation Directorates after a June 2014 rebranding.

== Ministers ==
The political responsibilities of the Directorates were those of the Cabinet Secretary for Rural Affairs and the Environment, Richard Lochhead MSP, whose responsibilities include: agriculture, fisheries and rural development including aquaculture and forestry, environment and natural heritage, land reform, water quality regulation and sustainable development. He was supported by the Minister for Environment, Roseanna Cunningham MSP.

== Directorates ==
The overarching Scottish Government Directorates, including the Environment Directorates were preceded by similar structures called "Departments" that no longer exist (although the word is still sometimes used in this context). As an overarching set of Directorates, the Environment Directorates incorporate a number of individual Directorates entitled:

- Rural (including Agriculture & Rural Development, Animal Health & Welfare, Landscapes & Habitats, Rural Communities, Food Industry Unit, Special Project Leader for Agriculture & Climate Change and Veterinary).
- Marine Scotland (including Aquaculture, Freshwater Fisheries & Licensing Policy, Performance, Science, Planning & Policy, Compliance and Sea Fisheries Policy).
- Rural and Environment Research and Analysis (including Rural & Environment Analytical Services and Research & Science).
- Rural Payments & Inspections (including IT & Business Support, Common Agricultural Policy Payments, Agricultural Services, Science & Advice for Scottish Agriculture and Regional Delivery).
- Environmental Quality (including Waste & Pollution Reduction, Drinking Water Quality and Water, Air, Soils & Flooding).
- Greener Scotland.

== Agencies and other bodies ==
The Directorates are responsible for one agency:

- Forestry Commission Scotland

The Directorates also sponsor several non-departmental public bodies including:

- Cairngorms National Park Authority
- Crofters Commission
- Deer Commission for Scotland
- Loch Lomond and the Trossachs National Park Authority
- Macaulay Institute
- Royal Botanic Garden Edinburgh
- Scottish Environment Protection Agency
- Scottish Natural Heritage

The Rural Development Council was set up in 2008 to advise the Cabinet Secretary on rural affairs and to "consider how best rural Scotland can contribute to the creation of a more successful country, through increasing sustainable economic growth".

== History ==
Prior to the Environment Directorates' creation in 2007, many of their responsibilities were undertaken by the Scottish Executive Environment and Rural Affairs Department (SEERAD).

== See also ==
- Minister for Environment, Energy and Rural Affairs in Wales
- Minister for Rural and Community Development and the Gaeltacht in Ireland
- Secretary of State for Environment, Food and Rural Affairs in Westminster
- Minister for Agriculture, Environment and Rural Affairs in Northern Ireland
