= Economy Directorates =

The Scottish Government Economy Directorates (Scottish Gaelic: Buidheann-stiùiridh Eaconamas) are a group of Directorates of the Scottish Government. They were rebranded as the Economy Directorates in July 2016, having previously been reorganised in December 2010 and then in June 2014. In July 2021, a further re-organisation led to the creation of the Net Zero Directorates, with Agriculture & Rural Economy, Marine Scotland, Energy & Climate Change, Environment & Forestry, Transport Scotland, Forestry and Land Scotland and Scottish Forestry moving to the new Directorate General.

The individual Directorates within the DG (Director-General) Economy family (the Economy Directorates) report to the Director-General, Gregor Irwin.

== Ministers ==
There is no direct relationship between Ministers and the Directorates. However, the activities of the Directorates include those under the purview of the Deputy First Minister and Cabinet Secretary for Finance, Shona Robison MSP, the Cabinet Secretary for Wellbeing Economy, Fair Work and Energy, Mairi McAllan MSP and the Cabinet Secretary for Transport, Fiona Hyslop MSP. They are supported in their work by the Minister for Small Business, Innovation and Trade, the Minister for Local Government Empowerment and Planning, the Minister for Community Wealth and Public Finance, the Minister for Green Skills, Circular Economy and Biodiversity and the Minister for Energy and the Environment.

== Directorates ==
The Directorates were previously the Enterprise, Environment and Innovation Directorates, reorganised in July 2016.

The overarching Scottish Government Directorates were preceded by similar structures called "Departments" that no longer exist (although the word is still sometimes erroneously used in this context). As an overarching unit, the Economy Directorates incorporate a number of individual Directorates entitled:

- Chief Economist Directorate
- Culture and Major Events Directorate
- Economic Development Directorate
- International Trade and Investment Directorate
- Jobs and Wellbeing Economy Directorate

== Agencies and other bodies ==
The Directorates were formerly responsible for two agencies, but responsibility has passed to the Net Zero Directorates:

- Forestry and Land Scotland
- Scottish Forestry

The Directorates also formerly sponsored several non-departmental public bodies - most responsibilities have passed to the Net Zero Directorates:

- Cairngorms National Park Authority
- Crofters Commission
- Loch Lomond and the Trossachs National Park Authority
- James Hutton Institute
- Royal Botanic Garden Edinburgh
- Scottish Environment Protection Agency
- NatureScot

== History ==
Prior to the creation of the Enterprise, Environment and Innovation Directorates in June 2014, the group was known as the Enterprise, Environment and Digital Directorates from December 2010. Prior to 2007, the work had been carried out by the old Scottish Executive Environment and Rural Affairs Department (SEERAD).

== See also ==
- Elin Jones Minister for Rural Affairs in Wales
