= Alasdair Allan =

Scottish National Party politician

- Official portrait, 2024

Acting Minister for Climate Action
- Acting; 1 July 2024 – 15 June 2025
- First Minister: John Swinney
- Preceded by: Gillian Martin
- Succeeded by: Position abolished

Minister for International Development and Europe
- In office 18 May 2016 – 26 June 2018
- First Minister: Nicola Sturgeon
- Preceded by: Humza Yousaf
- Succeeded by: Ben Macpherson

Minister for Learning, Science and Scotland's Languages
- In office 20 May 2011 – 18 May 2016
- First Minister: Alex Salmond; Nicola Sturgeon
- Preceded by: Angela Constance
- Succeeded by: Shirley-Anne Somerville

Member of the Scottish Parliament for Na h-Eileanan an Iar
- In office 3 May 2007 – 9 April 2026
- Preceded by: Alasdair Morrison
- Succeeded by: Donald MacKinnon

Personal details
- Born: 6 May 1971 (age 55) Ashkirk, Scotland
- Party: Scottish National Party
- Education: University of Aberdeen; University of Glasgow

Alasdair James Allan (born 6 May 1971) is a Scottish politician who was the Member of the Scottish Parliament (MSP) for the Na h-Eileanan an Iar constituency from 2007 to 2026. A member of the Scottish National Party (SNP), he served in the Scottish Government from 2011 to 2018, first as Minister for Learning, Science and Scotland's Languages and then Minister for International Development and Europe. Most recently, he served as Acting Minister for Climate Action between July 2024 and June 2025, during the maternity leave of Cabinet Secretary for Net Zero and Energy Màiri McAllan.

== Early life ==
Alasdair James Allan was born on 6 May 1971 in Ashkirk to Christine and John H. Allan. Allan graduated from the University of Glasgow with an MA in Scottish Language and Literature, continuing his studies at the University of Aberdeen, graduating with a PhD in Scots language in 1998.

He devoted his time and employment to the Scottish National Party in Peterhead, working for Alex Salmond, the former First Minister of Scotland, and he subsequently became assistant to Michael Russell. Previous to becoming an MSP, Alasdair was senior media relations officer for the Church of Scotland.

== Political career ==
Allan was the SNP candidate for Gordon at the 2003 Scottish Parliament election. As National Secretary of the SNP, he was responsible in July 2004 for the expulsion of Campbell Martin from the party after Martin had claimed that there was a case for supporters of independence not voting SNP.

Allan was next in line to become a list MSP for North East Scotland when Richard Lochhead resigned to fight the Moray by-election, however he decided instead to devote himself to contesting Na h-Eileanan an Iar, a key Labour–SNP marginal seat in the 2007 Scottish Parliament election. He relocated to Lewis and resigned his post as SNP National Secretary. This move proved successful, as he was elected with 46.6% of the vote – a 5.4% swing from Labour.

In the 2011 Scottish Parliament election Allan again stood for the SNP in the now renamed seat of Na h-Eileanan an Iar and increased his majority, returning to Holyrood with 65.3% of the vote, an increase of 18.7% and a swing of 15.8% from Labour.

Between 2011 and 2018, he served as a junior minister in the governments of Alex Salmond and Nicola Sturgeon. First as Minister for Learning, Science and Scotland's Languages between 2011 and 2016. And then as Minister for International Development and Europe between 2016 and 2018, during the aftermath of the 2016 UK referendum on EU membership.

In 2014, Allan voted against same-sex marriage in Scotland, saying "the view which so many of my constituents have expressed to me has a right to be recorded" – in contrast to the position of the majority of the SNP government.

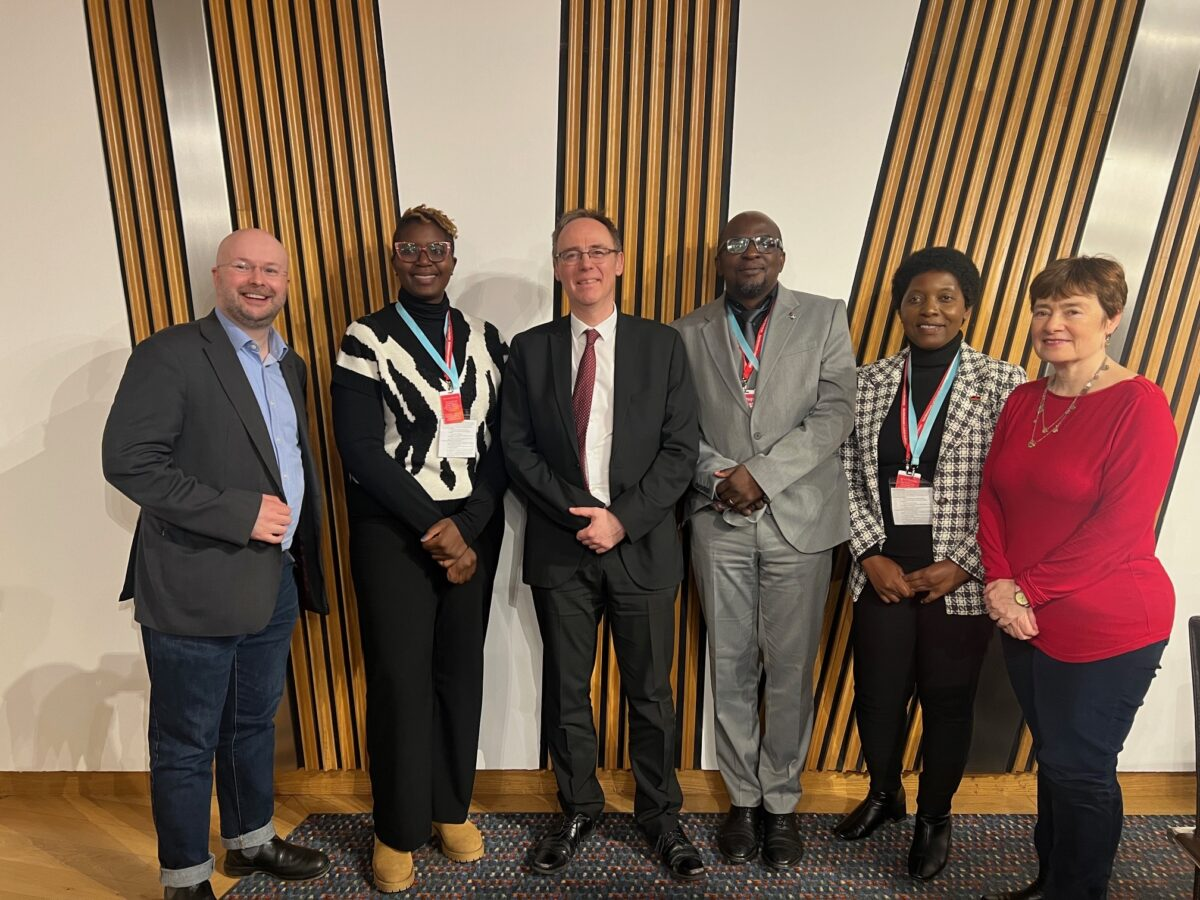
Scotland - Malawi 2024: Patrick Grady MP, Chilufya Chileshe, Dr Alasdair Allan MSP, Viwemi Chavula, Roseby Gadama MP and Sarah Boyack MSP

Between 2020 and 2021, Allan served as a member of the high-profile Committee on the Scottish Government Handling of Harassment Complaints which investigated the government's handling of complaints made against former First Minister Alex Salmond.

In May 2023, along with fellow Highlands MSPs Kate Forbes and Fergus Ewing, Allan rebelled against the SNP whip in a vote on the Scottish Government's plans to introduce Highly Protected Marin Areas (HPMAs) in Scotland, which would have restricted fishing access in certain areas. In the debate on the motion Allan said that, while not a natural rebel, "I feel that I have little choice today but to apply some real pressure on behalf of my genuinely worried island constituents."

During Màiri McAllan's maternity leave between July 2024 and June 2025 he served as Acting Minister for Climate Action while Gillian Martin, who normally held the role, took on McAllan's responsibilities as Cabinet Secretary for Net Zero and Energy.

In the 2026 Scottish Parliament election, he was unseated by Donald MacKinnon from Scottish Labour.

== Personal life ==
Allan is quadrilingual, and is able to speak: Scottish Gaelic, Norwegian, English and Scots.

In 2021, Allan wrote a book, Tweed Rins tae the Ocean (Tweed Runs to the Ocean), in response to claims made by former Conservative MP Rory Stewart that the Anglo-Scottish border was unnatural. Allan walked the Border and recorded his travels, similar to what Stewart did for his book The Marches.

== See also ==
- First Salmond government
- Second Salmond government
- First Sturgeon government

Party political offices
Preceded by Stewart Hosie	National Secretary of the Scottish National Party; 2003–2006	Succeeded by Duncan Ross
Scottish Parliament
Preceded by Alasdair Morrison	Member of the Scottish Parliament for the Western Isles; 2007–2026	Succeeded by Donald MacKinnon
