= Environment Secretary =

Environment Secretary can refer to:

- Cabinet Secretary for Rural Affairs and the Environment, Scotland
- Secretary for the Environment, Transport and Works, Hong Kong
- Secretary of State for Environment, Food and Rural Affairs, United Kingdom
- Secretary of the Environment (Mexico)

== See also ==
- Environment Directorate (disambiguation)
- Environment minister
- List of environmental ministries
