= HTK =

HTK may refer to:

- HTK (software)
- HTK Ltd, a British software company
- Histidine-tryptophan-ketoglutarate, a preservative for donor organs
- Kaman HTK, a helicopter
- HTK Academy of Design, Germany
