= HTK Limited =

Software companies of the United Kingdom

- Formerly: Hiteknowledge Limited (1996–2005)
- Type: Privately Held / Employee-Owned
- Industry: Telecom
- Founded: 29 April 1996; 30 years ago
- Headquarters: Ipswich, Suffolk, UK
- Key people: Marlon Bowser (CEO); Stewart Davies (Chairman)
- Revenue: unknown
- Number of employees: 40
- Website: htk.co.uk

HTK Limited is a software-as-a-service company that provides mobile phone messaging and IVR services.

Founded in 1996, HTK is headquartered in Ipswich, Suffolk, UK.

HTK provide mass notification services. Specifically, the "Police Direct" messaging service to Suffolk and Norfolk Constabularies.

In 2010 the HTK Horizon SaaS platform was selected by the Scottish Environment Protection Agency (SEPA) for their Floodline Warnings Direct service.

== History ==
HTK was founded in 1996 by Marlon Bowser and Adrian Gregory and from the outset focused on what has now become commonly known as Software-as-a-Service. in 2004, according to the Deloitte Fast 50 (UK), HTK was the 17th fastest growing company in the East of England. In 2005 The Times listed HTK 65th nationally and 4th in the East of England in the Sunday Times & Microsoft "Tech Track 100" awards. In 2009 the company was approved as a supplier to UK Government under a new framework agreement. In 2010 HTK launched version 2.2 of its Horizon platform, with a feature set that signals a shift from mass notification into the customer service automation market.

== See also ==
- Telemarketing
- SaaS
