= Environment Directorate (disambiguation) =

Environment Directorate may refer to:

- Directorate-General for the Environment (European Commission), environmental agency of the European Commission
- Norwegian Directorate for Nature Management
- Enterprise, Environment and Digital Directorates, a Scottish directorate
- Environment Directorates, a former Scottish directorate
- Environment, Planning and Sustainable Development Directorate, a former directorate of the Australian Capital Territory
