= Minister for Climate Action (Scotland) =

Junior ministerial post in the Scottish Government

The Minister for Climate Action was a junior ministerial post in the Scottish Government. As a result, the minister did not attend the Scottish Cabinet but reported to the Cabinet Secretary for Net Zero and Energy.

The role was expanded to include the Environment in June 2023 from its original role as Minister for Energy.

In June 2025, the office was abolished and its responsibilities absorbed into the role of Cabinet Secretary for Climate Action and Energy.

Gillian Martin served in the role for the entirety of its existence. However, between June 2024 and July 2025, Alasdair Allan served as Acting Minister while Martin covered for Màiri McAllan as Cabinet Secretary for Net Zero and Energy during her maternity leave.

== History ==
The office was created by First Minister Humza Yousaf.

== List of office holders ==
As Minister for Energy from March 2023 until June 2023; Minister for Energy and the Environment from June 2023 until February 2024; and Minister for Energy, Just Transition and Fair Work from February 2024 until May 2024.

Name	Portrait	Entered office	Left office	Party	First Minister
=== Minister for Energy ===
Gillian Martin		29 March 2023	13 June 2023	SNP	Humza Yousaf
=== Minister for Energy and the Environment ===
Gillian Martin		13 June 2023	8 February 2024	SNP	Humza Yousaf
=== Minister for Energy, Just Transition and Fair Work ===
Gillian Martin		8 February 2024	8 May 2024	SNP	Humza Yousaf
=== Minister for Climate Action ===
Gillian Martin		8 May 2024	11 June 2025	SNP	John Swinney
Alasdair Allan (acting)		1 July 2024	15 June 2025	SNP	John Swinney
