= Minister for Housing (Scotland) =

Portfolio in the Scottish Government

The Minister for Housing was a Junior ministerial post in the Scottish Government. As a result, the Minister did not attend meetings of the Scottish Cabinet. The minister reported to the Cabinet Secretary for Social Justice between 2023 and 2025.

The post was created in May 2007 as the Minister of Communities and Sport, but was renamed in a February 2009 Ministerial reshuffle which saw responsibility for the Sport portfolio transfer to the Minister for Public Health. The Minister originally reported (from 2007 to 2011) to the Cabinet Secretary for Health, Wellbeing and Sport, who had overall responsibility for the portfolio, and is a member of cabinet. This changed after the 2011 election and subsequent reshuffle so that the Minister then reported to the Cabinet Secretary for Infrastructure, Investment and Cities.

This changed again in November 2014 and the Minister then reported to Alex Neil as Cabinet Secretary for Social Justice, Communities and Pensioners' Rights. The Minister for Housing and Communities had specific responsibility for social inclusion, equalities, anti-poverty measures, housing and regeneration.

In June 2025, the junior ministerial position was abolished and replaced with the position of Cabinet Secretary for Housing.

== History ==
From 1999 to 2000 Communities was the responsibility of the Minister for Communities and from 2000 to 2003 was the responsibility of the Minister for Social Justice, both of which were Cabinet positions. The Minister for Communities was reinstated after the 2003 Scottish Parliament election. The Sport portfolio was the responsibility of Deputy Minister for Communities and Sport from 2000 to 2001 in the Dewar Government (which was not a cabinet position). From 2000 to 2001 the Minister for the Environment, Sport and Culture was the Cabinet Minister with whose responsibilities included sport. From 2001 to 2003 these roles were combined in the Minister for Communities and Sport, which was renamed the Minister for Tourism, Culture and Sport after the addition of the tourism portfolio, following the 2003 election.

The Salmond government, elected following the 2007 Scottish Parliament election created the junior post of Minister for Communities and Sport, combining the Sport and Communities portfolios. The minister assisted the Cabinet Secretary for Health and Wellbeing.

In September 2012 the junior post of Minister for Housing and Welfare was announced, with a portfolio intended to reflect the important role of housing in aiding economic recovery and the challenges that face those in poverty.

On 18 May 2016 the post of Minister for Social Security was created and the Housing and Welfare brief was split between that post and Minister for Local Government and Housing.

After the election of Humza Yousaf as First Minister, the Housing brief was again split from other portfolios and was again an area in its own right and Paul McLennan was appointed to the position.

In June 2025, John Swinney reshuffled the government upon the return of Màiri McAllan from maternity leave. He appointed her as Cabinet Secretary for Housing and abolished the junior ministerial role.

== Overview ==
The Minister for Housing had specific responsibility for promoting and coordinating policy in support of:

- Affordable Housing Supply Programme
- Housing to 2040 strategy
- homelessness and rough sleeping
- cladding remediation
- welfare and debt advice
- regulation of existing housing systems

== Minister ==
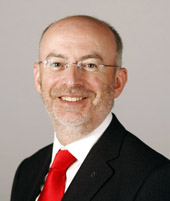
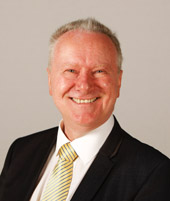
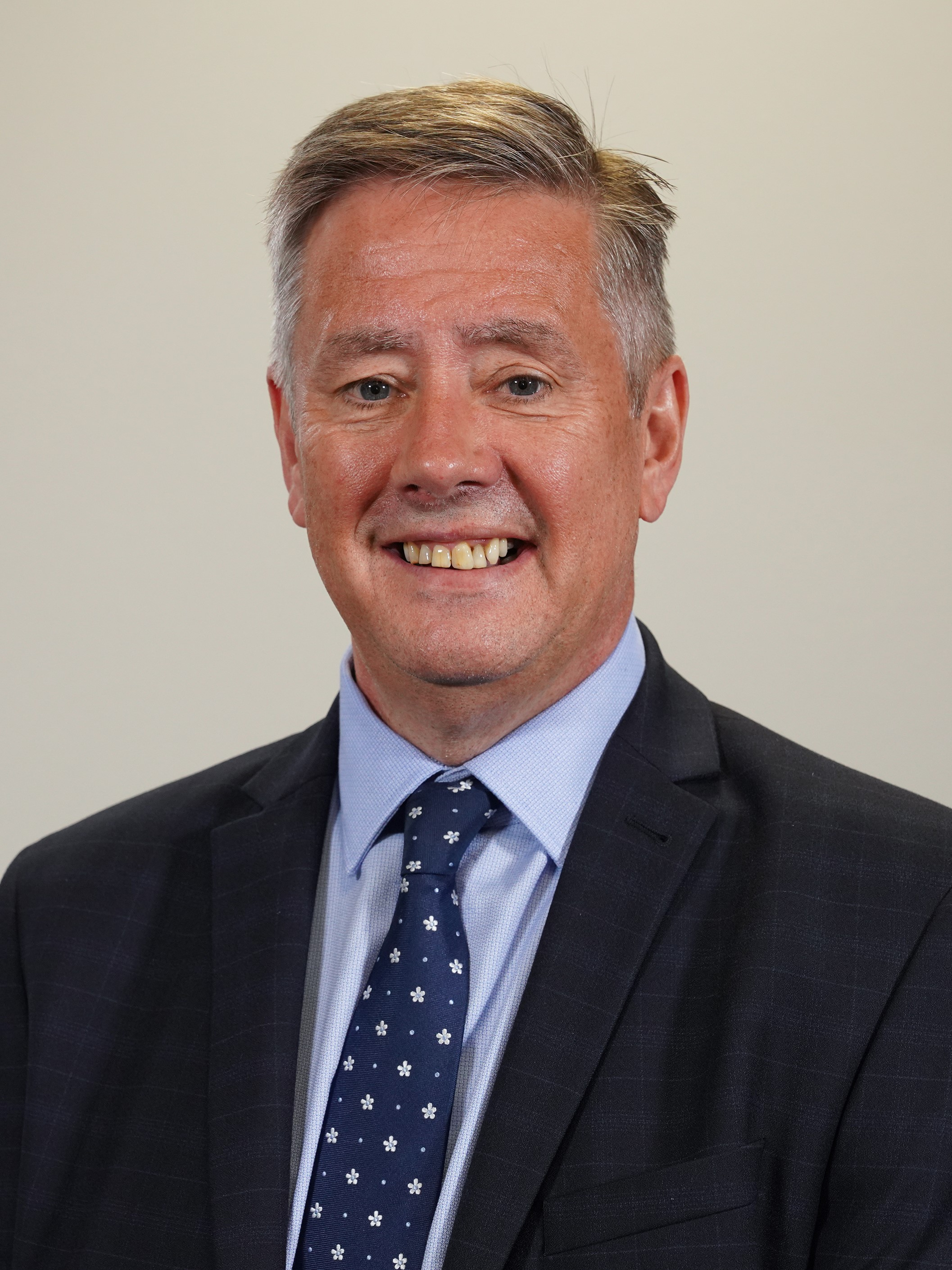
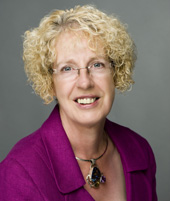
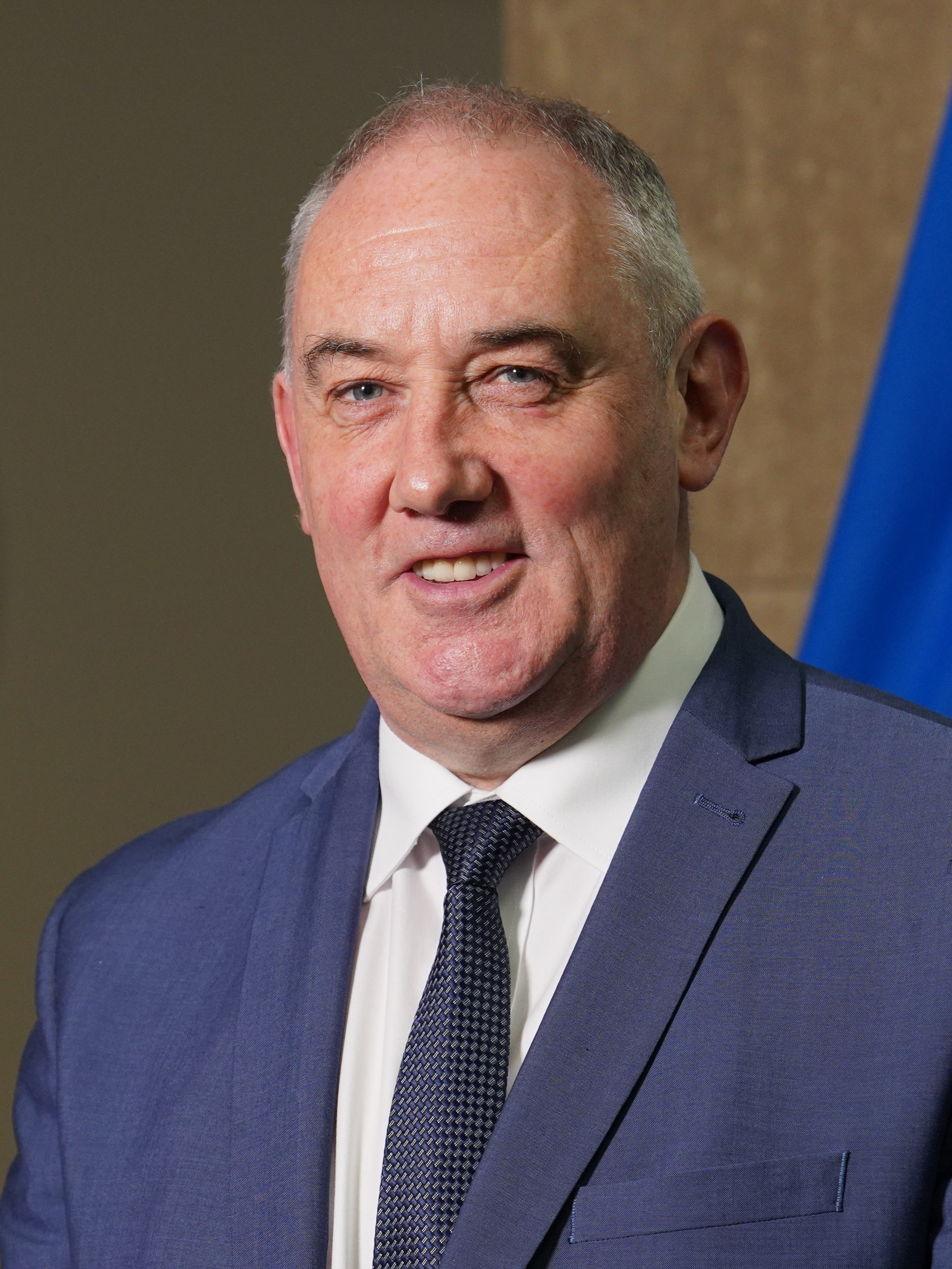
=== Minister for Communities and Sport ===
Name	Portrait	Entered office	Left office	Party	First Minister
Stewart Maxwell		17 May 2007	10 February 2009	Scottish National Party	Alex Salmond
=== Minister for Housing and Communities ===
Alex Neil		12 February 2009	25 May 2011	Scottish National Party	Alex Salmond
=== Minister for Housing and Transport ===
Keith Brown		25 May 2011	5 September 2012	Scottish National Party	Alex Salmond
=== Minister for Housing and Welfare ===
Margaret Burgess		5 September 2012	18 May 2016	Scottish National Party	Alex Salmond; Nicola Sturgeon
=== Minister for Housing ===
Paul McLennan		29 March 2023	11 June 2025	Scottish National Party	Humza Yousaf; John Swinney

== See also ==
- Scottish Parliament
- Scottish Government
