= Cabinet Secretary for Housing (Scotland) =

Cabinet position in the Scottish Government

Scotland Cabinet Secretary for Housing
- Scottish Government; Scottish Cabinet
- Style: Cabinet Secretary (within parliament); Housing Secretary (informal); Scottish Housing Secretary (outwith Scotland)
- Member of: Scottish Parliament; Scottish Cabinet
- Reports to: Scottish Parliament; First Minister
- Seat: Edinburgh
- Appointer: First Minister; (following approval from Scottish Parliament)
- Inaugural holder: Màiri McAllan
- Formation: 11 June 2025
- Salary: £126,452 per annum (2024) (including £72,196 MSP salary)
- Website: www.gov.scot

The Cabinet Secretary for Housing was a cabinet position in the Scottish Government. The first and only Cabinet Secretary for Housing was Màiri McAllan who served from 11 June 2025 to 20 May 2026.

The position was abolished and merged into the Cabinet Secretary for Social Justice and Housing in the Second Swinney government, following the 2026 Scottish Parliament election, as part of a "slimmed down cabinet".

== History ==
On 15 May 2024, the Scottish Government declared a "housing emergency". This pre-empted a vote in parliament, which the government would likely have lost, on a Scottish Labour motion calling on them to adopt this position. This motion passed later that day. Several councils had already declared a housing emergency, including Edinburgh City Council and Glasgow City Council (both in November 2023).

One year later, on 11 June 2025, the position of Cabinet Secretary for Housing was created. This replaced the previous junior ministerial role of Minister for Housing. Upon creating the role First Minister John Swinney said that the new position at cabinet level would "ensure government action is focused on tackling the housing emergency and providing energy efficient homes for the future." The inaugural holder of the position is Màiri McAllan who was appointed to the role following her return from maternity leave. The Housing brief had previously fallen under the Cabinet Secretary for Social Justice (and appeared in its title between 2021 and 2023 when Shona Robison served as Social Justice Secretary).

== Overview ==
=== Responsibilities ===
The responsibilities of the Cabinet Secretary for Housing include:

- Affordable Housing Supply Programme
- Housing to 2040 strategy
- homelessness and rough sleeping
- cladding remediation
- regulation of existing housing systems
- tenants rights
- building standards
- welfare and debt advice services
- heat networks
- Heat in Buildings programme
- heating and domestic energy transformation
- domestic energy efficiency
- fuel poverty

== List of office holders ==
Name	Portrait	Entered office	Left office	Party	First Minister
Cabinet Secretary for Housing
Màiri McAllan		11 June 2025	20 May 2026	Scottish National Party	John Swinney
