= Office for Environmental Protection =

Non-departmental public body in the UK

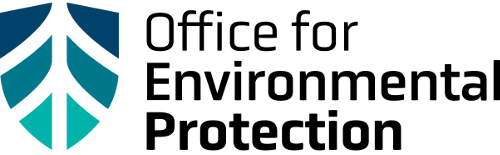

Non-departmental public body overview
- Formed: 17 November 2021
- Jurisdiction: Government of the United Kingdom, Northern Ireland Executive
- Status: Active
- Headquarters: Worcester, England
- Employees: 74 (2023)
- Annual budget: £12.1million (2022-23)
- Non-departmental public body executives: Dame Helen Ghosh, Chair; Natalie Prosser, Chief Executive
- Parent department: DEFRA, DAERA
- Website: www.theoep.org.uk

The Office for Environmental Protection (OEP) is a public oversight body for environmental protection in England and Northern Ireland "to provide independent oversight of the government's environmental progress". It was created as a statutory body by the Environment Act 2021.

The OEP was launched as an interim body in July 2021. The first chair is Glenys Stacey, who has called delays in the passage of the bill "extremely disappointing". Its first chief executive is Natalie Prosser and its headquarters are in Worcester. Concerns have been raised about potential lack of powers, independence, funding and about freedom of information. The OEP is intended to replace the environmental protection functions of the EU, but a report by the Bingham Centre for the Rule of Law expressed concerns that the bill as of June 2021 would provide no equivalent legal remedy for breaches. The OEP was formally legally constituted on 17 November 2021, and was given an environmental governance role in England in January 2022, and in Northern Ireland in February 2022.

== See also ==
- Environmental Standards Scotland - the equivalent body in Scotland
