= Scotland's Environmental and Rural Services =

Scotland’s Environment and Rural Services (SEARS) is a partnership between eight public bodies aiming to improve experience among Scotland's land managers by working together to provide an efficient and effective service.

The SEARS partners are:

- Animal Health and Veterinary Laboratories Agency
- Cairngorms National Park Authority
- Crofters Commission
- Forestry Commission Scotland
- Loch Lomond and the Trossachs National Park Authority
- Scottish Environment Protection Agency (SEPA)
- Scottish Government Rural Payments and Inspections Directorate
- Scottish Natural Heritage

== History ==
SEARS launched as a partnership of nine organisations in 2008. The Deer Commission for Scotland, which was formerly a member, was abolished and its functions transferred to Scottish Natural Heritage on 1 August 2010.

SEARS marked its first anniversary by publication of its first annual review at the Royal Highland Show 2009 by Environment Minister Roseanna Cunningham MSP.

Among the key service improvements since SEARS got underway in June 2008 are annual savings of almost £150,000 to the sheep farming industry in annual groundwater licence charge waivers and around 2,200 less inspections for land managers.
