= Scottish Executive Environment and Rural Affairs Department =

The Scottish Executive Environment and Rural Affairs Department (SEERAD) was a civil service department of the Scottish Executive. It was responsible for the following areas in Scotland: agriculture, rural development, food, the environment and fisheries.

The department was one of the main parts of the devolved Scottish administration dealing with land use, environmental protection, farming, and marine resources. It worked with a number of executive agencies and public bodies that carried out research, regulation, and conservation work across Scotland.

From early 2005, SEERAD was headed by Richard Wakeford. Political responsibility rested with the Minister for Environment and Rural Development, Ross Finnie, who was assisted by Deputy Minister Sarah Boyack.

SEERAD also worked with the United Kingdom government's Department for Environment, Food and Rural Affairs (Defra). Relations between the two departments were governed by a formal concordat which set out arrangements for cooperation on matters where responsibilities overlapped.

Following the election of a new administration in May 2007, the Scottish Executive underwent a wider reorganisation. Most of SEERAD's responsibilities were transferred to the newly established Environment Directorate, and the department ceased to exist as a separate organisation.

== Structure ==
=== Executive agencies ===
SEERAD had three executive agencies:

- Scottish Agricultural Science Agency, responsible for scientific services and agricultural research
- Fisheries Research Services, conducted scientific research into fisheries and aquaculture
- Scottish Fisheries Protection Agency, responsible for enforcing fisheries regulations in Scottish waters and monitoring compliance

=== Sponsored bodies ===
The department sponsored several non-departmental public bodies (NDPBs), including:

- Crofters Commission
- Deer Commission for Scotland
- Royal Botanic Garden Edinburgh
- Scottish Environment Protection Agency
- Scottish Natural Heritage
- Loch Lomond and The Trossachs National Park Authority
- The Macaulay Institute

The department also worked with Scottish Water.
