= Deer (Scotland) Act 1959 =

Act of the Parliament of the United Kingdom

Deer (Scotland) Act 1959 (Note: Section 37(1).)
- Act of Parliament
- Parliament of the United Kingdom
- Long title: An Act to further the conservation and control of red deer in Scotland; to prevent the illegal taking and killing of all species of deer in Scotland; and for purposes connected with the matters aforesaid.
- Citation: 7 & 8 Eliz. 2. c. 40
- Territorial extent: Scotland (Note: Section 37(2).)

Dates
- Royal assent: 14 May 1959
- Commencement: 14 June 1959 (Note: Section 37(3).)
- Repealed: 18 November 1996
Other legislation
Amends	See § Repealed enactments
Repeals/revokes	See § Repealed enactments
Amended by	Science and Technology Act 1965; Deer (Amendment) (Scotland) Act 1967; Local Government (Scotland) Act 1973; Statute Law (Repeals) Act 1974; Criminal Procedure (Scotland) Act 1975; House of Commons Disqualification Act 1975; Deer (Amendment) (Scotland) Act 1982; Deer Act 1991; Local Government etc. (Scotland) Act 1994; Requirements of Writing (Scotland) Act 1995; Deer (Amendment) (Scotland) Act 1996
Repealed by	Deer (Scotland) Act 1996

Status: Repealed

Text of statute as originally enacted

Revised text of statute as amended

The Deer (Scotland) Act 1959 (7 & 8 Eliz. 2. c. 40) was an act of the Parliament of the United Kingdom that made provisions for the conservation and control of red deer and the prevention of the illegal taking and killing of all species of deer in Scotland.

== Provisions ==
=== Repealed enactments ===
Section 36 of the act repealed 2 enactments, listed in the third schedule to the act.

Citation	Short title	Extent of repeal
2 & 3 Will. 4. c. 68	Game (Scotland) Act 1832	In section one, the words "deer roe" in both places where these words occur; in section four the word "deer".
11 & 12 Geo. 6. c. 45	Agriculture (Scotland) Act 1948	Sections thirty-nine, forty, forty-one, and forty-two so far as relating to red deer; in section forty-three, subsection (2); sections forty-four, forty-five, forty-six and forty-seven.

== Subsequent developments ==
Section 36 of, and schedule 3 to, the act were repealed by section 1 of, and part XI of the schedule to, the Statute Law (Repeals) Act 1974, which came into force on 27 June 1974.

The whole act was repealed by section 48(2) of, and schedule 5 to, the Deer (Scotland) Act 1996, which came into force on 18 November 1996.
