= Deer (Scotland) Act 1996 =

Act of the Parliament of the United Kingdom

Deer (Scotland) Act 1996 (Note: Section 48(1).)
- Act of Parliament
- Parliament of the United Kingdom
- Long title: An Act to consolidate the legislation relating to deer in Scotland.
- Citation: 1996 c. 58
- Territorial extent: Scotland (Note: Section 48(3)–(4).)

Dates
- Royal assent: 24 July 1996
- Commencement: 18 November 1996 (Note: Section 48(6).)
Other legislation
Amends	Agriculture (Scotland) Act 1948; Deer Act 1991; See § Repealed enactments
Repeals/revokes	See § Repealed enactments
Amended by	Nature Conservation (Scotland) Act 2004; Electronic Communications (Scotland) Order 2006; Crofting Reform etc. Act 2007; Public Services Reform (Scotland) Act 2010; Wildlife and Natural Environment (Scotland) Act 2011; Criminal Justice (Scotland) Act 2016; Land Reform (Scotland) Act 2016; Crown Estate Transfer Scheme 2017; Animals and Wildlife (Penalties, Protections and Powers) (Scotland) Act 2020; Natural Environment (Scotland) Act 2026

Status: Amended

Text of statute as originally enacted

Text of the Deer (Scotland) Act 1996 as in force today (including any amendments) within the United Kingdom, from legislation.gov.uk.

The Deer (Scotland) Act 1996 (c. 58) is an act of the Parliament of the United Kingdom governing the conservation and management of deer within Scotland. The Act repealed the Deer (Scotland) Act 1959.

== Provisions ==
Part I of the act establishes the Deer Commission for Scotland.

Part II of the act concerns the conservation, control and sustainable management of deer.

Part III of the act defines the offences that could be taken against deer, such as the unlawful killing of deer.

Part IV of the act defines the licensing to deal in venison, as well as further powers for NatureScot, then known as the Scottish National Heritage or SNH.

=== Repealed enactments ===
Section 48(2) of the act repealed 6 enactments, listed in schedule 5 to the act.

Citation	Short title	Extent of repeal
7 & 8 Eliz. 2. c. 40	Deer (Scotland) Act 1959	The whole act.
1967 c. 37	Deer (Amendment) (Scotland) Act 1967	The whole act.
1973 c. 65	Local Government (Scotland) Act 1973	In Schedule 27, paragraph 143.
1982 c. 19	Deer (Amendment) (Scotland) Act 1982	The whole act.
1991 c. 54	Deer Act 1991	Section 17(5).
1996 c. 44 (Note: Printed as "1996 c. 43" in schedule 5 of the act as enacted, but the Deer (Amendment) (Scotland) Act 1996 is 1996 c. 44; legislation.gov.uk's own annotation to section 48(6) confirms the correct citation as 1996 c. 44.)	Deer (Amendment) (Scotland) Act 1996	The whole act.

=== Schedules ===
The act consists of 5 schedules:

- Schedule 1 consists of other provisions relating to the Deer Commission for Scotland;
- Schedule 2 defines how to create, amend and revoke control schemes;
- Schedule 3 sets the penalties of the offences set out in Part III;
- Schedule 4 amends sections of the Agriculture (Scotland) Act 1948 and the Deer Act 1991;
- Schedule 5 defines the acts or sections that are repealed by the Deer (Scotland) Act 1996.

Schedule 1 was repealed by the Public Services Reform (Scotland) Act 2010.

== See also ==
- Deer Commission for Scotland
