= Deer Act 1980 =

Act of the Parliament of the United Kingdom

Deer Act 1980 (Note: Section 9(1).)
- Act of Parliament
- Parliament of the United Kingdom
- Long title: An Act to prevent the poaching of deer; to control the sale and purchase of venison; to amend the Deer Act 1963; and for purposes connected therewith.
- Citation: 1980 c. 49
- Territorial extent: England and Wales (Note: Section 9(3).)

Dates
- Royal assent: 8 August 1980
- Commencement: 1 November 1980 (sections 2 and 3); 8 November 1980 (rest of act); (Note: Section 9(4).)
- Repealed: 25 November 1991

Other legislation
- Amends: Deer Act 1963; Theft Act 1968
- Repealed by: Deer Act 1991

Status: Repealed

Text of statute as originally enacted

Revised text of statute as amended

The Deer Act 1980 (c. 49) was an act of the Parliament of the United Kingdom. It came into operation in November 1980, and has since been fully repealed by the Deer Act 1991.

The main effect of the act was to put measures in place to prevent the poaching of deer and control the sale of venison. It amended the Deer Act 1963.

== Subsequent developments ==
The whole act was repealed by section 17(6) of, and schedule 4 to, the Deer Act 1991, which came into force on 25 October 1991.
