= Environmental Standards Scotland =

Non-ministerial office of the Scottish Government

- Scottish Gaelic: Ìrean Àrainneachdail na h-Alba

Agency overview
- Formed: 21 October 2021
- Type: Non-ministerial government department
- Jurisdiction: Scotland
- Headquarters: Thistle House, 91 Haymarket Terrace, Edinburgh
- Annual budget: £2,192,000 (2022-23)
- Agency executives: Mark Roberts, Chief Executive; Dr Richard Dixon, Chair; Jim Martin, Founding Chair
- Website: www.environmentalstandards.scot

Environmental Standards Scotland (Scottish Gaelic: Ìrean Àrainneachdail na h-Alba) is a non-ministerial office of the Scottish Government. It was formed in October 2021 to scrutinise, investigate and secure improvements in the effectiveness of, and compliance with, environmental law. Its remit effectively replaces the scrutiny and enforcement role over Scotland's environmental law that was previously undertaken by the European Union prior to Brexit.

The office's remit covers all public authorities in Scotland, including the Scottish Government and its public bodies, as well organisations carrying out functions on behalf of public authorities, and covers the land, air and marine environment of Scotland. It does not undertake monitoring of environmental issues directly, rather it requests information about policies, procedures, and environmental data, from other bodies. Where it is found that an existing environmental law or standard does not provide sufficient environmental protection, Environmental Standards Scotland is able to make an improvement report, which requires the Scottish Parliament to produce an action plan for implementing the report's recommendations.

Environmental Standards Scotland has the power to issue "information notices" that require a body to provide relevant information, and "compliance notices" requiring specific actions to be undertaken. If a body does not implement the actions in a compliance notice then ESS can apply to the courts to seek enforcement. If a case is considered "serious" the office has the power to apply to the courts for a judicial review.

== Equivalent bodies ==
The Office for Environmental Protection is the equivalent body for England and Northern Ireland, and also has jurisdiction across the UK (including Scotland) in respect of reserved matters.

The Interim Environmental Protection Assessor for Wales (IEPAW) is the equivalent body for Wales.

== See also ==
- Scottish Environment Protection Agency
- NatureScot
