= Stewart Maxwell =

Scottish politician (born 1963)

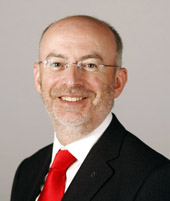

Convener of the Scottish Parliament Education and Culture Committee
- In office 14 June 2011 – 24 March 2016
- Preceded by: Karen Whitefield

Minister for Communities and Sport
- In office 17 May 2007 – 10 February 2009
- First Minister: Alex Salmond
- Preceded by: Rhona Brankin
- Succeeded by: Alex Neil as Minister for Housing and Communities and Shona Robison as Minister for Public Health and Sport

Member of the Scottish Parliament for West Scotland
- In office 1 May 2003 – 24 March 2016

Personal details
- Born: 24 December 1963 (age 62) Glasgow, Scotland
- Party: Scottish National Party
- Other political affiliations: Labour (until 1988)
- Education: Glasgow College of Technology

William Stewart Maxwell (born 24 December 1963) is a Scottish National Party (SNP) politician. He was the Minister for Communities and Sport from 2007 to 2009 and a Member of the Scottish Parliament (MSP) for the West of Scotland region from 2003 to 2016.

== Early life ==
Maxwell was born on 24 December 1963 in Glasgow, Scotland. Maxwell attended Kings Park Secondary School before graduating from Glasgow College of Technology with a BA Honours Social Sciences. He worked for Strathclyde Fire Brigade between 1993 and 2003 before being elected.

== Political career ==
He stood as the SNP candidate in the 2003 election and was elected by the regional list.

After his election in 2003, Stewart Maxwell became the Deputy Convener of the Parliament's Justice 1 Committee and a member of the Subordinate Legislation Committee. He transferred from Justice 1 to Justice 2 Committee in 2004 and was also appointed to the post of SNP spokesperson on Public Health and the Shadow Deputy Minister for Health. In September 2006 he was promoted to the SNP's Shadow Cabinet when he became the Party Spokesperson for Sport and Culture. At the end of 2006 he moved from the Justice 2 Committee to the Parliament's Enterprise and Culture Committee and remained on the Subordinate Legislation Committee. After the SNP's victory at the 2007 Scottish Parliament Election, he became the Minister for Communities and Sport. However, he returned to the backbenches in the SNP Ministerial reshuffle on 10 February 2009. After leaving Ministerial office he became one of two representatives from the Scottish Parliament on the European Committee of the Regions and became a member of the Parliament's Justice Committee. After the 2011 election he was appointed to the post of Convener of the Education and Culture Committee and as one of the SNP members of the Scotland bill Committee.

Stewart Maxwell is best known for being the architect of the ban on smoking in enclosed places in Scotland. He laid a motion in the Scottish Parliament stating that he intended to bring forward a bill to ban smoking in public places in July 2003 and went on to introduce the Bill to ban tobacco smoking in enclosed public places in February 2004. The Scottish Executive at first opposed this proposal, but were eventually forced to accept the idea after it received widespread support. They eventually published their own bill which was passed on 30 June 2005 and the ban came into effect on 26 March 2006.

For the last few years he has also been campaigning on knife crime and has made various proposals to tackle this issue in Scotland, including the mandatory reporting of knife attacks by hospitals to the police and the use of hand-held metal detectors at the doors of some pubs and clubs. He successfully moved an amendment to the Police, Public Order and Criminal Justice Bill which doubled the maximum sentence for carrying a knife in public.

He was a member of the SNPs National Executive Committee as well as serving as the Vice Convenor in charge of Publicity during 2003–2004. During the 2003–2007 session of Parliament he was a member of six Parliamentary cross party groups; Tobacco Control, Sport, Contemporary Scottish Music Industry, Culture and Media, Cancer and Food. He is currently a member of the following CPGs: Tobacco Control, Veterans, Golf and Universities and Colleges.

The SNP hold a 'One Member One Vote' ballot of all Party members to determine the order of their candidates on the regional lists for the Scottish Parliament elections. Stewart Maxwell, who was third on the SNP list for the West of Scotland in 2003, was elected to first place on the SNP list for 2007 and topped the list again in 2011.

In November 2006 he was made Honorary Vice-president of the Royal Environmental Health Institute of Scotland for his work on the introduction of the ban on smoking in public places.

Ahead of the 2016 elections, Maxwell was confirmed as the SNP's candidate for the Eastwood constituency in July 2015. In October it was announced that he would be second on the SNP's list of candidates for West Scotland. In a close contest, Conservative Jackson Carlaw won the seat and Labour's Ken Macintosh was pushed into third. Maxwell was not re-elected.

== Armed Forces Legal Action ==
Maxwell was appointed as an honorary patron of Armed Forces Legal Action (AFLA) in April 2014. AFLA is a network of law firms committed to offering discounted legal services to members of the UK Armed Forces community. AFLA was founded by Scottish solicitor Allan Steele WS, who stood against Maxwell as the Scottish Liberal Democrat candidate in the Westminster Parliamentary election of 2001 and the Holyrood Parliamentary election of 2003.

He is married with one daughter.

Political offices
Preceded by Rhona Brankin as Minister for Communities	Minister for Communities and Sport; 2007–2009	Succeeded by Alex Neil as Minister for Housing and Communities
Preceded by Rhona Brankin as Minister for Communities	Minister for Communities and Sport; 2007–2009	Succeeded by Shona Robison as Minister for Public Health and Sport
