= Cabinet Secretary for Climate Action and Rural Affairs =

Scottish Government cabinet position

Scotland Cabinet Secretary for Climate Action and Rural Affairs
- Scottish Gaelic: Rùnaire a' Chaibineit airson Gnìomh Clìomaid agus Cùisean Dùthchail

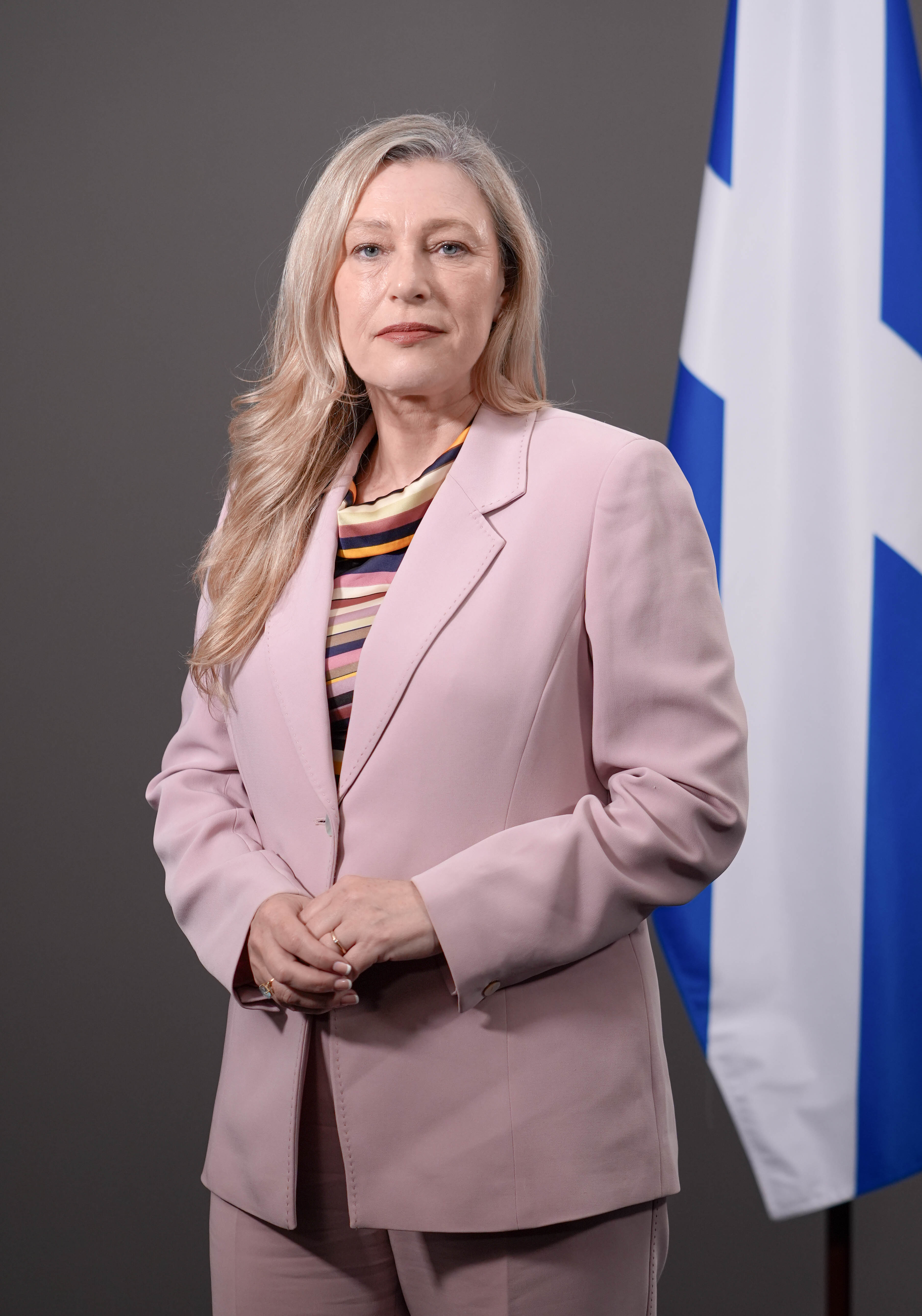
- Incumbent; Gillian Martin since 11 June 2025
- Scottish Government; Scottish Cabinet
- Style: Cabinet Secretary (within Scottish Parliament); Climate Action and Energy Secretary (informal and only within Scotland); Scottish Climate Action and Energy Secretary (outwith Scotland)
- Member of: Scottish Parliament; Scottish Cabinet
- Reports to: Scottish Parliament; First Minister
- Seat: Edinburgh
- Appointer: First Minister; (following approval from Scottish Parliament)
- Inaugural holder: Michael Matheson Cabinet Secretary for Net Zero, Energy and Transport
- Formation: 20 May 2021
- Salary: £126,452 per annum (2024) (including £72,196 MSP salary)
- Website: www.gov.scot

The Cabinet Secretary for Climate Action and Rural Affairs is a Scottish Government Cabinet position with responsibility for the Net Zero and environmental policy of Scotland. The incumbent is Gillian Martin who has held the environmental brief since June 2025. She also previously served as Acting Cabinet Secretary for Net Zero and Energy while her predecessor Mairi McAllan was on maternity leave between July 2024 and June 2025.

== History ==
The role was first titled Cabinet Secretary for Net Zero, Energy and Transport, with the initial holder being Michael Matheson, who was appointed in June 2018 following a reshuffle of the Second Sturgeon government.

Following the formation of the First Yousaf government in March 2023, the Net Zero and Energy role was divided. Màiri McAllan was appointed Cabinet Secretary for Net Zero and Just Transition, whilst Neil Gray was appointed Cabinet Secretary for Wellbeing Economy, Fair Work and Energy. In June 2023, McAllan's title was retitled as Cabinet Secretary for Transport, Net Zero and Just Transition.

After the February 2024 reshuffle of Yousaf's government the role was merged with the Economy portfolio, to create the Cabinet Secretary for Wellbeing Economy, Net Zero and Energy.

In May 2024, John Swinney renamed the role as Cabinet Secretary for Net Zero and Energy in his government with Màiri McAllan appointed to the role. Between July 2024 and June 2025 Gillian Martin served as Acting Cabinet Secretary while McAllan was on maternity leave.

In June 2025, the role was renamed again to Cabinet Secretary for Climate Action and Energy and Martin was appointed to the role. In May 2026 the role was retitled Cabinet Secretary for Climate Action and Rural Affairs.

== Responsibilities ==
The Cabinet Secretary for Climate Action and Rural Affairs is responsible for the following policy areas:

=== Climate action ===
- Cross government co-ordination of Net Zero policy
- Climate crisis and environmental protection
- Environmental and climate justice and international climate change
- Environmental quality
- Sustainable development
- Flood prevention and coastal erosion
- Drinking water quality and water supply
- Hydronation
- Circular economy
- Emissions Trading Schemes
- Deposit return and waste issues
- Green Growth Accelerator
- Nature recovery targets
- Biodiversity and endangered species

=== Rural affairs ===
- Rural policy and strategy
- Land reform and land use
- Natural resources and peatland
- National parks and natural heritage

=== Public bodies ===
The following public bodies report to the cabinet secretary:

- Cairngorms National Park Authority
- Crown Estate Scotland
- Drinking Water Quality Regulator for Scotland
- Loch Lomond and The Trossachs National Park Authority
- NatureScot
- Royal Botanic Garden Edinburgh
- Scottish Environment Protection Agency
- Scottish Land Commission
- Scottish Water
- Zero Waste Scotland

== List of officeholders ==
As is typical of Scottish government roles, the Climate Action and Energy portfolio has gone through many iterations since its inception. The incumbent minister is Gillian Martin.

Name	Portrait	Entered office	Left office	Party	First Minister
Role formed and combined with Cabinet Secretary for Transport, Infrastructure and Connectivity Cabinet Secretary for Net Zero, Energy and Transport
Michael Matheson		20 May 2021	29 March 2023	Scottish National Party	Nicola Sturgeon
Role split with and combined with Cabinet Secretary for Wellbeing Economy, Fair Work and Energy Cabinet Secretary for Net Zero and Just Transition
Màiri McAllan		29 March 2023	13 June 2023	Scottish National Party	Humza Yousaf
Role retitled with and combined with Transport portfolio Cabinet Secretary for Transport, Net Zero and Just Transition
Màiri McAllan		13 June 2023	8 February 2024	Scottish National Party	Humza Yousaf
Role reshuffled with Cabinet Secretary for Wellbeing Economy, Fair Work and Energy, Role separated from Cabinet Secretary for Transport Cabinet Secretary for Wellbeing Economy, Net Zero and Energy
Màiri McAllan		8 February 2024	8 May 2024	Scottish National Party	Humza Yousaf
Economy responsibility reshuffled to Cabinet Secretary for Economy and Gaelic Cabinet Secretary for Net Zero and Energy
Màiri McAllan		8 May 2024	11 June 2025	Scottish National Party	John Swinney
Cabinet Secretary for Climate Action and Energy
Gillian Martin		11 June 2025	20 May 2026	Scottish National Party	John Swinney
Cabinet Secretary for Climate Action and Rural Affairs
Gillian Martin		20 May 2026	Incumbent	Scottish National Party	John Swinney
