= Gillian Martin =

Scottish politician

Gillian Martin MSP
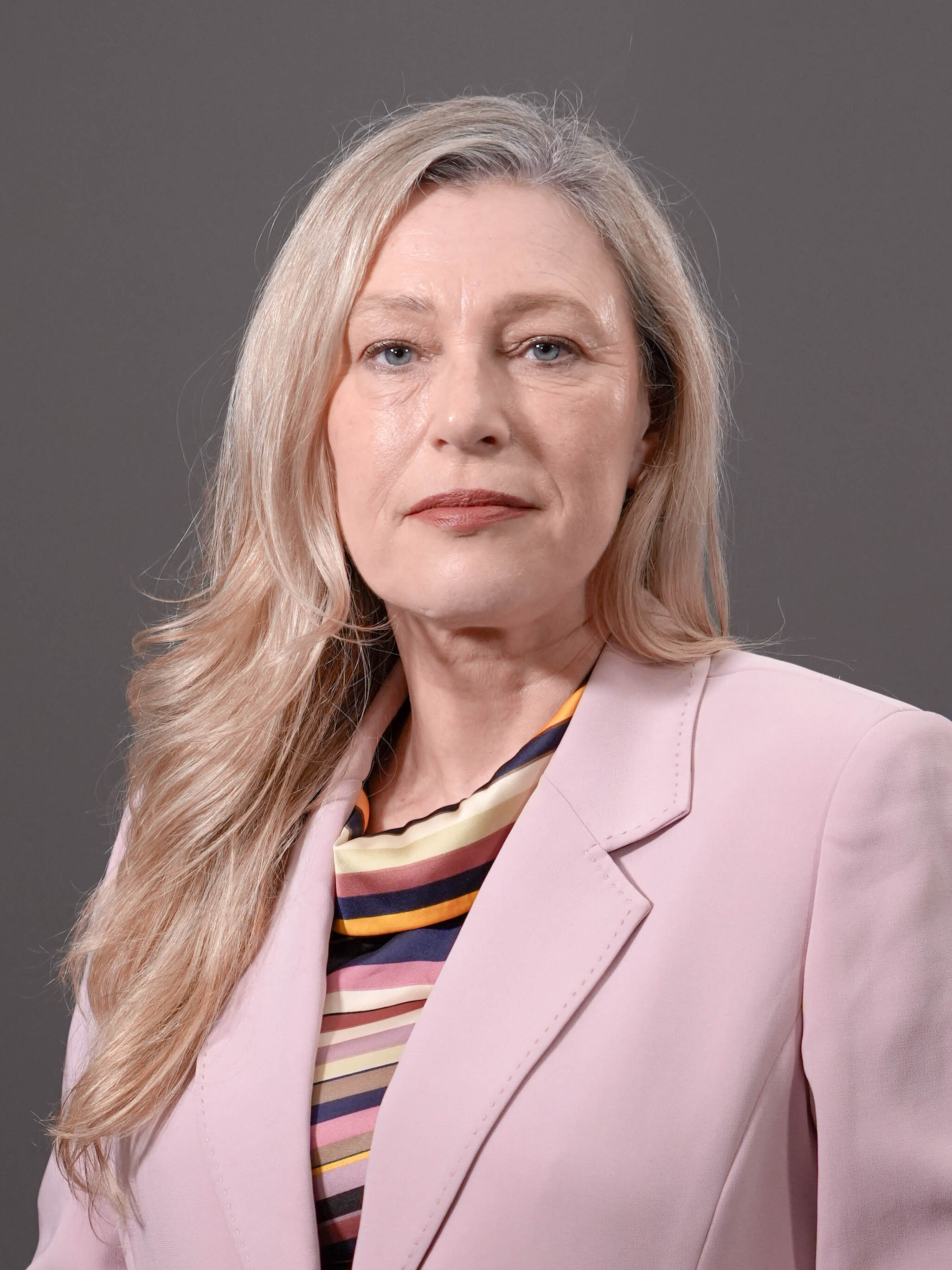
- Official portrait, 2026

Cabinet Secretary for Climate Action and Rural Affairs (Note: Cabinet Secretary for Climate Action and Energy from June 2025 to May 2026)
- Incumbent
- Assumed office 11 June 2025
- First Minister: John Swinney
- Preceded by: Office established

Cabinet Secretary for Net Zero and Energy
- Acting; 1 July 2024 – 11 June 2025 (Note: Martin served as Acting Cabinet Secretary while Màiri McAllan was on maternity leave)
- First Minister: John Swinney
- Preceded by: Màiri McAllan
- Succeeded by: Office abolished

Minister for Climate Action (Note: As Minister for Energy from March 2023 until June 2023; Minister for Energy and the Environment from June 2023 until February 2024; and Minister for Energy, Just Transition and Fair Work from February 2024 until May 2024.)
- In office 29 March 2023 – 11 June 2025
- First Minister: Humza Yousaf; John Swinney
- Preceded by: Office established
- Succeeded by: Office abolished

Member of the Scottish Parliament for Aberdeenshire East
- Incumbent
- Assumed office 6 May 2016
- Preceded by: Alex Salmond
- Majority: 943 (2.7%)

Personal details
- Party: Scottish National Party
- Education: University of Glasgow
- Website: gillianmartinmsp.com

Gillian Anne Martin is a Scottish politician who has served as Cabinet Secretary for Climate Action and Rural Affairs since 2025. She previously served as Minister for Climate Action between 2023 and 2025, and as Acting Cabinet Secretary for Net Zero and Energy between July 2024 and June 2025, filling the latter role on an interim basis for the duration of Màiri McAllan's maternity leave. A member of the Scottish National Party (SNP), she has been a Member of the Scottish Parliament (MSP) for the Aberdeenshire East since 2016.

== Early life and career ==
Martin grew up in Newburgh and was educated at Ellon Academy. Her parents have always been politically active.

A graduate of the University of Glasgow, she worked as a lecturer in further education for 15 years, including at North East Scotland College. Alongside this, Martin ran her own business in video production and training for the energy sector.

She was the manager of an emergency media response team for oil and gas companies for 10 years.

== Early political activity ==
Martin became politically active during the Scottish independence referendum. She helped found Women for Independence (WFI). She was on the WFI executive committee as the member for North East region, and has continued participation as an ordinary member since becoming an MSP.

She joined the SNP on 19 September 2014, on the morning after the Scottish independence referendum. She emerged as a candidate for the Aberdeenshire East constituency of the Scottish Parliament in July 2015. and was selected by local party members the following month.

== Political career ==
=== Election to Holyrood ===
Martin was elected to serve as a MSP in the 2016 Scottish Parliament election. The seat was previously held by Alex Salmond.

Martin brought forward the Seat Belts on School Transport (Scotland) Bill. The purpose of the Bill is to introduce a requirement to Scottish law that all dedicated home-to-school transport service vehicles are fitted with seat belts, as there is presently no UK legal obligation for the provision of seatbelts on such vehicles.

=== Failed appointment as a Junior Minister ===
On 27 June 2018 the Scottish Government announced that Martin would be appointed Minister for Further Education, Higher Education and Science. However, following media attention around a series of offensive blogs Martin wrote during her time as a college lecturer, First Minister Nicola Sturgeon subsequently withdrew Martin's nomination when presenting her new ministerial team to the Scottish Parliament for approval. Among the controversial blog entries, Martin mocked trans women as "hairy knuckled lipstick- wearing transitional transgender Laydees". She also wrote of a survey of transgender people, "the EU clearly have a Tranny Trove [of money]". Of Scotland's membership of the United Kingdom she wrote, "Don’t make me trot out the now clichéd comparison to the abused partner in a marriage. Cliché it may be but clichés come from truth." And of African American customers she wrote they were to be, "To be avoided."

=== Backbencher; 2018 to 2023 ===
In September 2018, Martin was appointed as Convener of the Environment, Climate Change and Land Reform Committee.

From 2016 to 2018 Martin was co-convenor of the Scottish Parliament cross-party group on Oil and Gas. She has used her time in parliament to highlight the downturn of the oil and gas sector in the North East, and the effect it has had on those living in Aberdeenshire East. Martin has spoken out on behalf of workers who have been discriminated against due to their oil and gas connections, and has been a vocal supporter of the efforts being by the Scottish Government made to assist those facing unemployment.

=== Minister for Climate Action; 2023 to 2025 ===
On 29 March 2023, Martin was appointed Minister for Energy. Her role was expanded to include the environment. In May 2024, her role was renamed Minister for Climate Action.

=== Acting Cabinet Secretary for Net Zero and Energy; 2024 to 2025 ===
Martin also filled in the role of Cabinet Secretary for Net Zero and Energy for the duration of incumbent Màiri McAllan's maternity leave (July 2024 to June 2025). While Martin served in this capacity, Alasdair Allan became Acting Minister for Climate Action.

=== Cabinet Secretary for Climate Action and Energy; 2025 to present ===
In June 2025, Martin was promoted to the position of Cabinet Secretary for Climate Action and Energy following McAllan's return from maternity leave.

== Personal life ==
Martin is married to a teacher named John Martin who teaches at Turriff Academy and has two children. She lives in Newmachar, Aberdeenshire.

== Controversies ==
In 2018, Martin apologised "unreservedly" for "inappropriate and offensive" remarks she had posted on a blog about transgender people in 2007. On 28 June 2018, she issued a second apology about offensive remarks made a decade earlier about the tipping habits of black customers.

== Notes ==
Scottish Parliament
| Preceded by Alex Salmond | Member of the Scottish Parliament for Aberdeenshire East; 2016–present | Incumbent |
