= Floodline =

United Kingdom emergency warning service

The Floodline is the flood warning and information service used in the United Kingdom to issue flood alerts and warnings to the public, emergency organisations and businesses. The system uses observed data from rain, river and coastal gauges, combined with weather forecasts to accurately predict the likelihood and timing of flooding. When flooding is predicted within an area, a message is issued through the Floodline service. It is operated by the Environment Agency in England, Natural Resources Wales, and the Scottish Environment Protection Agency.

== Messages ==
There are different messages the Floodline gives depending on the situation:

- FLOOD ALERT: Flooding is possible, be prepared. The Environment Agency endeavour to issue this message up to 24 hours in advance of expected river and coastal flooding, but warning time may be as little as 2 hours. Flooding of low-lying land is expected. Flood Alerts are early warning messages about possible flooding. They prompt you to remain alert and vigilant and provide people with time to make early preparations for potential flooding. Flood Alerts are issued for geographically representative areas, usually matching Local Authority boundaries. They are generally 9am-5pm, 7 days a week. In exceptional circumstances, alerts may be issued outside these hours.
- FLOOD WARNING: Flooding is expected, immediate action required. The target for these to be issued is 3–6 hours in advance of expected flooding. It may not be possible to give 3-hours notice in areas prone to rapid flooding or when water levels have escalated quicker than expected. Flooding is imminent. Immediate action is required, take measures to protect yourself and your property. They are issued 24 hours a day.
- SEVERE FLOOD WARNING: Severe flooding, danger to life. These are issued whenever severe flooding is likely to cause significant risk to life, destruction of properties or local communities. Flooding is imminent and could pose a risk to life and cause significant disruption to essential services, such as water and electricity supplies. Prepare to evacuate and co-operate with the emergency services. These are issued 24 hours a day.
- NO LONGER IN FORCE MESSAGES: These are issued to notify you when warnings and alerts are no longer in force. No further flooding is currently expected for your area. Flood waters may still be around but you can start the clean up process. 24 hours a day.
