= Night Poaching Act 1828 =

Act of the Parliament of the United Kingdom

Night Poaching Act 1828 (Note: The citation of this act by this short title was authorised by section 1 of, and the first schedule to, the Short Titles Act 1896. Due to the repeal of those provisions it is now authorised by section 19(2) of the Interpretation Act 1978.)
- Act of Parliament
- Parliament of the United Kingdom
- Long title: An Act for the more effectual Prevention of Persons going armed by Night for the Destruction of Game.
- Citation: 9 Geo. 4. c. 69
- Territorial extent: United Kingdom

Dates
- Royal assent: 19 July 1828
- Commencement: 19 July 1828 (Note: The Acts of Parliament (Commencement) Act 1793.)
- Repealed: Northern Ireland: Scotland: 29 June 2011 (Note: The Wildlife and Natural Environment (Scotland) Act 2011 (Commencement No. 1) Order 2011 (SSI 2011/279).)
Other legislation
Repeals/revokes	Night Poaching Act 1817
Amended by	Summary Jurisdiction Act 1884; Statute Law Revision (No. 2) Act 1888; Criminal Justice Administration Act 1962; Courts Act 1971; Wild Creatures and Forest Laws Act 1971; Criminal Procedure (Scotland) Act 1975; Criminal Law Act 1977; Criminal Justice Act 1982; Police, Crime, Sentencing and Courts Act 2022
Repealed by	Northern Ireland: Game Law Amendment Act (Northern Ireland) 1951; Scotland: Wildlife and Natural Environment (Scotland) Act 2011

Status: Partially repealed

Text of statute as originally enacted

Revised text of statute as amended

Text of the Night Poaching Act 1828 as in force today (including any amendments) within the United Kingdom, from legislation.gov.uk.

The Night Poaching Act 1828 (9 Geo. 4. c. 69) is an act of the Parliament of the United Kingdom still in effect in the 21st century. It forbids night poaching, especially taking or destroying game on lands, etc., by night, or entering lands at night to take or destroy game.

For the purposes of the act the word 'game' is deemed to include hares, pheasants, partridges, grouse, heath or moor game, black game, and bustards.

The act – in particular, its original provisions for transportation to colonies such as Tasmania – made headlines in 2007, when two rabbit poachers were convicted and fined under it before magistrates at Hereford.

== Subsequent developments ==
The whole act was repealed for Northern Ireland by the schedule to the Game Law Amendment Act (Northern Ireland) 1954 (c. 4 (N.I.)), which came into force on.

Section 7 of the act was repealed by section 1(1) of, and part XIX of schedule 1 to, the Statute Law (Repeals) Act 1976, which came into force on 27 May 1976.

The whole act was repealed for Scotland by section 43(1) of, and part 2 of the schedule to, the Wildlife and Natural Environment (Scotland) Act 2011, which came into force on 29 June 2011.

== See also ==
- Game Act 1831
