= Deer Act 1991 =

Act of the Parliament of the United Kingdom

Deer Act 1991 (Note: Section 18(1).)
- Act of Parliament
- Parliament of the United Kingdom
- Long title: An Act to consolidate certain enactments relating to deer with amendments to give effect to recommendations of the Law Commission.
- Citation: 1991 c. 54
- Territorial extent: England and Wales (Note: Section 18(2). Section 17(5), which extended to Scotland only, was repealed by the Deer (Scotland) Act 1996.)

Dates
- Royal assent: 25 July 1991
- Commencement: 25 October 1991 (Note: Section 18(3).)
Other legislation
| Amends | Deer (Scotland) Act 1959; See § Repealed enactments |
| Repeals/revokes | See § Repealed enactments |
| Amended by | Local Government (Wales) Act 1994; Deer (Scotland) Act 1996; Countryside and Rights of Way Act 2000; Ministry of Agriculture, Fisheries and Food (Dissolution) Order 2002; Criminal Justice Act 2003; Serious Organised Crime and Police Act 2005; Natural Environment and Rural Communities Act 2006; Regulatory Reform (Game) Order 2007; Regulatory Reform (Deer) (England and Wales) Order 2007; Natural Resources Body for Wales (Functions) Order 2013 |

Status: Amended

Text of statute as originally enacted

Revised text of statute as amended

Text of the Deer Act 1991 as in force today (including any amendments) within the United Kingdom, from legislation.gov.uk.

The Deer Act 1991 (c. 54) is an act of the Parliament of the United Kingdom that consolidated enactments related to deer in England and Wales, with amendments to give effect to recommendations of the Law Commission.

== Provisions ==
The act gives protections to wild deer.

=== Repealed enactments ===
Section 17(6) of the act repealed 9 enactments, listed in schedule 4 to the act.

| Citation | Short title | Extent of repeal |
|---|---|---|
| 1963 c. 36 | Deer Act 1963 | The whole act. |
| 1973 c. 54 | Nature Conservancy Council Act 1973 | In Schedule 1, paragraph 5. |
| 1977 c. 4 | Roe Deer (Close Seasons) Act 1977 | The whole act. |
| 1980 c. 49 | Deer Act 1980 | The whole act. |
| 1981 c. 69 | Wildlife and Countryside Act 1981 | In Schedule 7, paragraphs 4 to 6. |
| 1982 c. 19 | Deer (Amendment) (Scotland) Act 1982 | In Schedule 2, paragraph 4. |
| 1984 c. 60 | Police and Criminal Evidence Act 1984 | In Schedule 6, paragraphs 13 and 23. |
| 1987 c. 28 | Deer Act 1987 | The whole act. |
| 1990 c. 43 | Environmental Protection Act 1990 | In Schedule 9, paragraph 3. |
