= Wildlife and Natural Environment (Scotland) Act 2011 =

Act of the Scottish Parliament

Wildlife and Natural Environment (Scotland) Act 2011 (Note: Section 43(3).)
- Act of the Scottish Parliament
- Scottish Parliament
- Long title: An Act of the Scottish Parliament to make provision in connection with wildlife and the natural environment; and for connected purposes.
- Citation: 2011 asp 6
- Territorial extent: Scotland

Dates
- Royal assent: 7 April 2011
- Commencement: various (Note: Section 43(1)–(2).)
Other legislation
Amends	Ground Game Act 1880; Local Government (Scotland) Act 1966; Protection of Badgers Act 1992; Criminal Procedure (Scotland) Act 1995; Deer (Scotland) Act 1996
Repeals/revokes	Game (Scotland) Act 1772; Night Poaching Act 1828; Game (Scotland) Act 1832; Night Poaching Act 1844; Hares (Scotland) Act 1848; Game Licences Act 1860; Poaching Prevention Act 1862; Game Laws Amendment (Scotland) Act 1877; Customs and Inland Revenue Act 1883; Hares Preservation Act 1892; Finance Act 1924; Destructive Imported Animals Act 1932; Game Act 1970; Import of Live Fish (Scotland) Act 1978

Status: Current legislation

Text of statute as originally enacted

Revised text of statute as amended

Text of the Wildlife and Natural Environment (Scotland) Act 2011 as in force today (including any amendments) within the United Kingdom, from legislation.gov.uk.

The Wildlife and Natural Environment (Scotland) Act 2011 (asp 6) or WANE Act is an act of the Scottish Parliament which introduced legislation to that country, affecting the way land and the environment is managed. The act also amended earlier environmental legislation, including the Wildlife and Countryside Act 1981 and the Deer (Scotland) Act 1996.

== Principal elements ==
The act affected game-shooting, species protection, and introduced new wildlife offences into Scotland such as vicarious liability. Amongst other things it:

- abolished the designation of areas of special protection for wild birds;
- increased regulation of snaring practices;
- introduced a closed season for the killing of mountain hares;
- introduced a new regime for controlling invasive non-native species;
- changed arrangements for deer management and deer stalking;
- strengthened badger protection;
- required Scottish Ministers to present an annual report to Parliament of offences relating to wildlife crime;
- changed the legislation relating to the burning of moorland (muirburn), previously prescribed in the Hill Farming Act 1946;
- made operational changes to how Sites of Special Scientific Interest are managed;
- required three-yearly reports to be published by public bodies on compliance with the Biodiversity Duty.

== See also ==
- Environment (Wales) Act 2016
- Natural Environment and Rural Communities Act 2006
