= Deer Commission for Scotland =

The Deer Commission for Scotland was an executive non-departmental body of the Scottish Government. It was responsible for the conservation, control and sustainable management of all species of wild deer in Scotland. It also acted as the Government's advisor on deer-related matters.

The Commission consisted of 10 members, appointed by the Scottish Ministers. Its head office was at Great Glen House, Inverness, and the organisation was a member of SEARS (Scotland's Environmental and Rural Services).

== History ==
The Deer Commission for Scotland was formed by the Deer (Scotland) Act 1996. Under section 1 of the Public Services (Reform) (Scotland) Act 2010 the functions of the Commission were transferred to Scottish Natural Heritage on 1 August 2010 and the Commission was dissolved.

== Role ==
The Commission had statutory roles under the 1996 Act. These included: Authorisations which granted the power to cull deer in circumstances when they would not normally have the legal right to shoot them (e.g. if they are causing damage); and Statutory Returns which individuals or organisations have to complete to provide the Commission with details of culls performed.

In addition, the Commission had a consultancy role including publishing Best Practice Guidelines and Annual Cull Targets.

== Criticism ==
It has been claimed that the compulsory slaughter the Commission carries out has driven foreign shooters away, with critics claiming that this is 'killing' the £100 million Scottish deer-stalking industry, with so few stags to shoot that many return to their countries emptyhanded.
