= Màiri McAllan =

Scottish politician

Màiri McAllan MSP
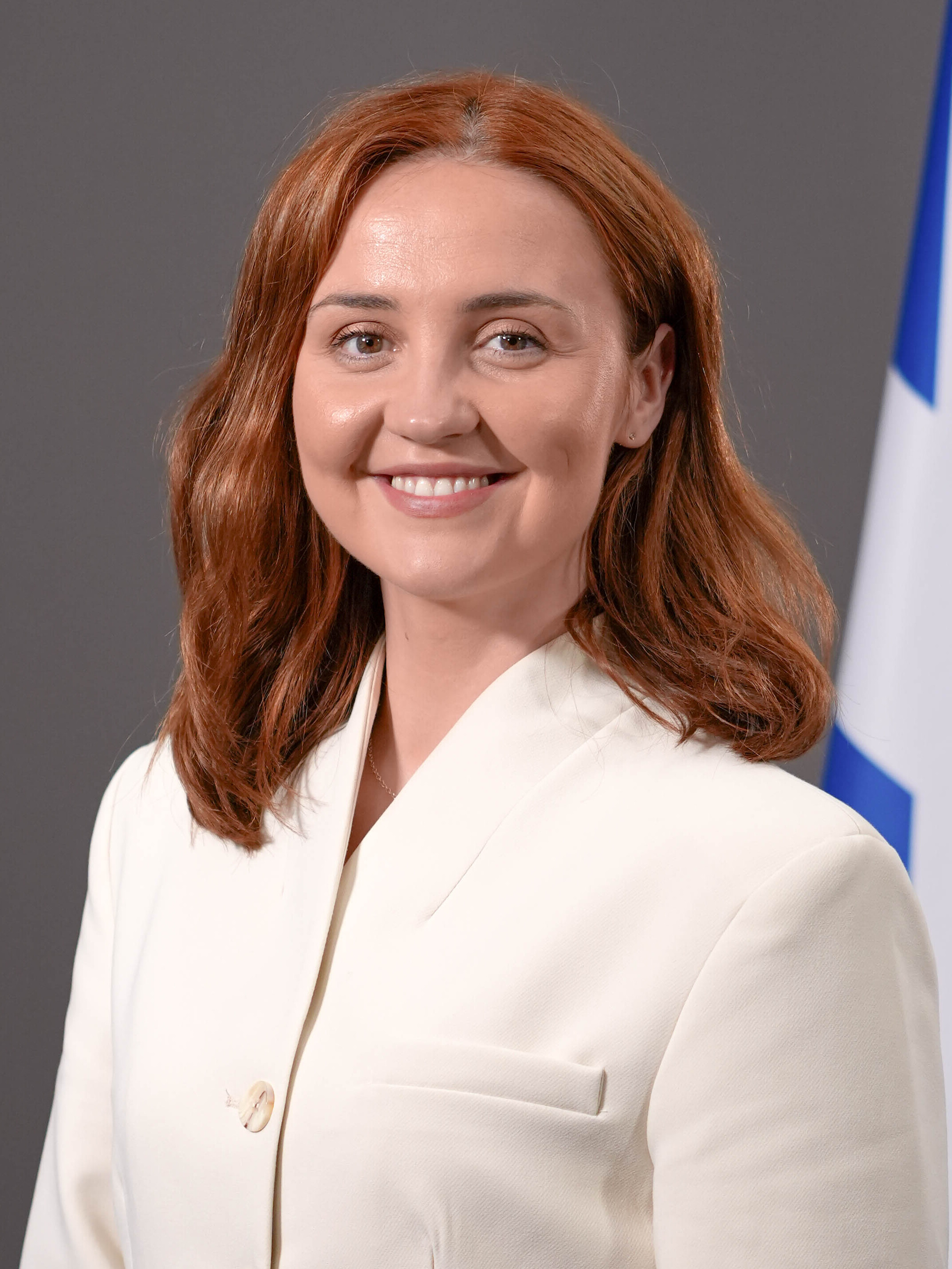
- Official portrait, 2026

Cabinet Secretary for Education, Culture and Gaelic
- Incumbent
- Assumed office 20 May 2026
- First Minister: John Swinney
- Preceded by: Jenny Gilruth (Education); Angus Robertson (Culture); Kate Forbes (Gaelic)

Cabinet Secretary for Housing
- In office 11 June 2025 – 20 May 2026
- First Minister: John Swinney
- Preceded by: Paul McLennan (as Minister for Housing)
- Succeeded by: Shirley-Anne Somerville

Cabinet Secretary for Net Zero and Energy (Note: The post was known as the Cabinet Secretary for Wellbeing Economy, Net Zero and Energy from February to May 2024 before responsibility for the Economy was moved to Kate Forbes.)
- In office 8 February 2024 – 11 June 2025
- First Minister: Humza Yousaf; John Swinney
- Preceded by: Neil Gray (Wellbeing Economy); Herself (Net Zero)
- Succeeded by: Gillian Martin

Cabinet Secretary for Transport, Net Zero and Just Transition (Note: Cabinet Secretary for Net Zero and Just Transition (March 2023–June 2023).)
- In office 29 March 2023 – 8 February 2024
- First Minister: Humza Yousaf
- Preceded by: Michael Matheson
- Succeeded by: Fiona Hyslop (Transport); Herself (Net Zero)

Minister for Environment, Biodiversity and Land Reform
- In office 20 May 2021 – 29 March 2023
- First Minister: Nicola Sturgeon
- Preceded by: Ben Macpherson
- Succeeded by: Office abolished

Member of the Scottish Parliament for Clydesdale
- Incumbent
- Assumed office 6 May 2021
- Preceded by: Aileen Campbell
- Majority: 4,388 (12.2%)

Personal details
- Born: Màiri Louise McAllan Glasgow, Scotland
- Party: Scottish National Party
- Spouse: Iain Renwick (m. 2023)
- Children: 1
- Education: University of Glasgow

Màiri Louise McAllan is a Scottish politician serving as Cabinet Secretary for Education, Culture and Gaelic since 2026. She has been a minister in the Scottish Government since 2021 and her former roles include serving as Cabinet Secretary for Housing and Cabinet Secretary for Net Zero and Energy. A member of the Scottish National Party (SNP), she has been the Member of the Scottish Parliament (MSP) for Clydesdale since 2021. McAllan is a former corporate solicitor, who also served as a special advisor to First Minister Nicola Sturgeon prior to her election to the Scottish Parliament.

== Early life ==
McAllan grew up and was educated in Biggar, South Lanarkshire, then studied Scots law at the University of Glasgow, also spending time at the University of Ghent in Belgium.

Her father Ian is also a politician who has served as a local councillor for South Lanarkshire's Clydesdale East ward (which covers Biggar) since 2017.

Before entering politics, McAllan co-founded human rights organisation RebLaw Scotland, which aims to use the law as a tool in the fight for social justice and held its first conference in 2017, worked as a corporate lawyer specialising in energy and natural resources and was a voluntary director of East Ayrshire's Women's Aid.

== Political career ==
She stood unsuccessfully in Dumfriesshire, Clydesdale and Tweeddale at the 2017 United Kingdom general election, where she came second to Conservative incumbent David Mundell.

McAllan served as a special advisor in the Scottish Government on environmental matters, first to then Environment Secretary Roseanna Cunningham and subsequently to then First Minister Nicola Sturgeon.

On 6 May 2021 she was elected as Member of the Scottish Parliament (MSP) for Clydesdale.

On 19 May 2021, McAllan was appointed to the new government as Minister for Environment, Biodiversity and Land Reform.

In March 2023, McAllan was promoted to the cabinet under new First Minister Humza Yousaf as Cabinet Secretary for Net Zero and Just Transition. In June this post was renamed Cabinet Secretary for Transport, Net Zero and Just Transition.

In December 2023 she controversially defended her government's record by stating "more often than not world leaders are approaching the Scottish Government" asking how they had "managed to lead the way so successfully on a number of fronts". In a subsequent Freedom of Information request made by the Daily Mail, the government were unable to provide the names of the world leaders as it did not retain such data.

Following the return of Fiona Hyslop to government in February 2024, McAllan became the Cabinet Secretary for Wellbeing Economy, Net Zero and Energy. Hyslop took on the transport brief while McAllan gained the economy and energy brief from Neil Gray. During her time in this role, McAllan was responsible for scrapping the Scottish Government's target of 75% emission reduction by 2030, instead reverting to the UK target of 2045.

In May 2024, John Swinney succeeded Yousaf as First Minister and McAllan's role was renamed Cabinet Secretary for Net Zero and Energy, with Kate Forbes gaining the economy brief. Between July 2024 and June 2025, Gillian Martin served as Acting Cabinet Secretary in this role while McAllan was on maternity leave.

In June 2025, McAllan returned from maternity leave and was appointed to the newly created position of Cabinet Secretary for Housing.

In May 2026, McAllan was appointed Cabinet Secretary for Education, Culture and Gaelic.

== Personal life ==
McAllan married her teenage boyfriend, local farmer Iain Renwick, on 5 August 2023 in her hometown of Biggar, South Lanarkshire. The couple live in Crawick, near Sanquhar, Dumfries and Galloway. In February 2024, they announced that she was pregnant with her first child. She took maternity leave in the summer and gave birth to a boy on 2 August. She returned to her role as a government minister in June 2025.

== Notes ==
Scottish Parliament
Preceded by Aileen Campbell	Member of the Scottish Parliament for Clydesdale; 2021–present	Incumbent
