= Scottish Environment Protection Agency =

Environmental regulator in Scotland

- Scottish Environment Protection Agency logo
- Abbreviation: SEPA
- Formation: 1996
- Legal status: Executive non-departmental public body of the Scottish Government
- Purpose: Environmental protection and regulation in Scotland
- Location: Stirling, Scotland
- Region served: Scotland
- Chief Executive: Nicole Paterson
- Website: www.sepa.org.uk

The Scottish Environment Protection Agency (SEPA; Scottish Gaelic: Buidheann Dìon Àrainneachd na h-Alba) is Scotland's environmental regulator and national flood forecasting, flood warning and strategic flood risk management authority. Its main role is to protect and improve Scotland's environment. SEPA does this by helping business and industry to understand their environmental responsibilities, enabling customers to comply with legislation and good practice and to realise the economic benefits of good environmental practice. One of the ways SEPA does this is through the NetRegs environmental guidance service. It protects communities by regulating activities that can cause harmful pollution and by monitoring the quality of Scotland's air, land and water. The regulations it implements also cover the storage, transport and disposal of radioactive materials.

SEPA is an executive non-departmental public body (executive NDPB, often known as a quango) of the Scottish Government. SEPA was established in 1996 by the Environment Act 1995 and is responsible for the protection of the natural environment in Scotland. SEPA is a member of SEARS (Scotland's Environmental and Rural Services).

On 24 December 2020 SEPA was subject to a serious and complex cyber-attack that significantly impacted their contact centre, internal systems, processes and communications. Hackers stole over 4,000 digital files. SEPA refused to pay the ransom, and on 21 January 2021 learned that the information stolen had been published online illegally; some of the information was already publicly available, while some was not.

== Corporate information ==
=== Mission ===
SEPA's mission statement is to be an environmental regulator and an effective and influential authority on the environment.

=== Aims ===
SEPA provides a system of environmental protection for Scotland that aims to improve the environment and help deliver the Scottish Government's overall environmental objectives.

So that it can effectively achieve its mission and aims, SEPA has created a Corporate Plan which lists its priorities and goals.

=== Structure ===
SEPA employs around 1,300 staff who are involved in protecting Scotland's environment and human health. SEPA's staff are employed in a wide range of specialist areas which include: chemistry, ecology, environmental regulation, hydrology, engineering, quality control, planning, communications, business support and management functions.

The agency operates through three directorates:

==== Operations ====
The previously named Environmental Protection and Improvement (EPI) Directorate is now known as Operations after an internal reorganisation in April 2010. The directorate includes environmental policy, radioactive substances policy and regulation, SEPA's advisory work, river basin management planning, national planning, strategic environmental assessment and Organisational Development (encompassing Human Resources, Health and Safety and Learning and Development).

==== Science and strategy ====
The Environmental and Organisational Strategy Directorate and Environmental Science Directorate were merged in a reorganisation that took place in April 2010. The directorate is now known as the Science and Strategy Directorate and includes Chemistry, Ecology, Marine, Hydrology, Environmental Quality, Radioactive Substances, Science, Organisational Planning and Improvement, Environmental Strategy. Communications is also part of this directorate, because of its strategic role within the organisation.

==== Finance and corporate services ====
The Finance and Corporate Services directorate undertakes the financial planning and reporting for the organisation as well as its procurement, facilities management, information systems and management and resilience activities.

=== Governance ===
The Agency Board legally constitutes SEPA and board members are appointed by Scottish Ministers. SEPA's Chairman and a deputy chairman are appointed by Scottish Ministers and the Agency Board appoints a Chief Executive.

SEPA used to have Regional Boards (North, South-west and South-east) that undertook local engagement with customers, partners and stakeholders. However, these were phased out by 2010 and SEPA now adopts a different approach to engage with its stakeholders at a local level.

== Activities and outcomes ==
=== Flooding ===
SEPA is Scotland's national flood forecasting, flood warning and strategic flood risk management authority.

SEPA operates the 24/7 Floodline flood warning service in Scotland.

SEPA operates Scotland's flood warning service. This is a 24-hour, 7-day-a-week, information service which includes direct warnings by phone and online flood warnings and flooding updates through its dedicated telephone number 0345 988 1188.

As the name suggests, the Floodline service is designed to give the public early warning of likely flooding in specific areas. The service also gives advice on what to do before, during and after a flood.

In Wales, Floodline is operated by Natural Resources Wales, and in England by the Environment Agency.

In March 2011 SEPA enhanced its provision with a direct warnings extension to its Floodline service. This sends flood warning information for a chosen geographical area direct to customers who have registered a mobile or landline telephone number.

Also, that month the Scottish Flood Forecasting Service (SFFS) was formed, a partnership between SEPA and the Met Office with £750,000 of funding from the Scottish Government. Its role is to provide flooding forecasts to Category 1 and 2 responders.

=== Air Quality ===
In order to protect Scotland's air quality, SEPA regulates and monitors industrial activities and processes in Scotland that may lead to local airborne pollution. In order to do this effectively, SEPA works closely with local authorities and other partners to manage and improve air quality locally."

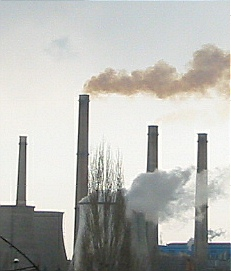
SEPA regulates and monitors air pollution across Scotland.

There are many things which can negatively affect good air quality such as vehicle and transport emissions, energy production, some industrial processes, waste and agriculture. The emissions that are produced by these activities can significantly damage air quality, which can lead to health problems, depletion of the ozone layer and changes to other natural habitats.

The overall picture in Scotland is one of good air quality which has been getting better over the last 30 years or so, particularly in urban areas. But the picture is not perfect. There are some localised problems in Scottish towns, mainly caused by traffic emissions. ... Scotland’s carbon dioxide emissions are contributing to global climate changes which are likely to have significant long term environmental impacts. Alasdair D. Paton, SEPA Chief Executive, 1999.

SEPA and the Scottish Government work in partnership with the Department for Environment, Food and Rural Affairs (Defra) to ensure the objectives that are listed in the Air Quality Strategy for England, Scotland, Wales and Northern Ireland are achieved.

The Scottish Air Quality database (SAQD) and website were commissioned by the Scottish Government. Launched in April 2007, SAQD was set up to provide a single source of air quality information for Scotland that would improve research quality to support and evaluate Scotland's air quality policies whilst also providing the public with more easily understood and accessible local air quality information.

=== Climate Change ===
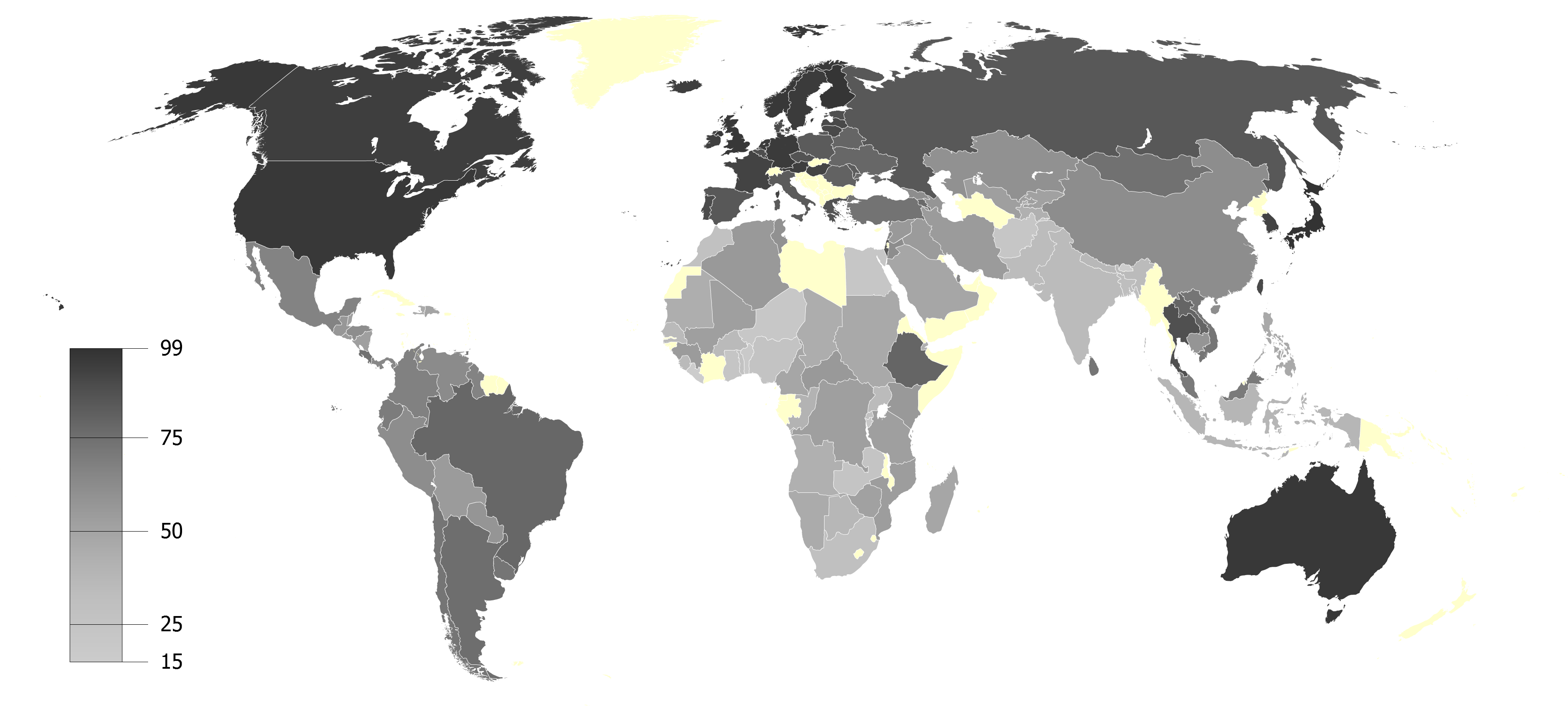
Climate change awareness by country 2008–2009.

SEPA's position on climate change recognises that it is the greatest threat to our physical and socio-economic future. The organisation has produced a climate change plan which contains details about how SEPA will reduce its own carbon emissions. This five-year climate change plan introduces SEPA's specific role in climate change mitigation and what they will do over the next five years to further integrate climate change across the organisation.

SEPA's Climate Change Plan was subject to a Strategic Environmental Assessment (SEA) as part of its preparation. This was required under the Environmental Assessment (Scotland) Act 2005. The SEA helped SEPA to understand the environmental effects of the plan and allowed for improvements to be made throughout the preparation process. The environmental report explains, in detail, the findings of the SEA. As the plan has now been formally adopted, SEPA is required to explain how it has taken account of the SEA process in a "SEA Statement".

SEPA, Scottish Natural Heritage (SNH), Forestry and Land Scotland (FLS) and Historic Scotland are all government-funded organisations with responsibilities for different aspects of Scotland's environment and heritage; in 2009 a joint statement on climate change was prepared as part of a joint approach in Scotland.

"The Scientific evidence is now overwhelming: climate change presents very serious global risks and it demands an urgent global response".

In Scotland, the effects of climate change can be seen in raised temperatures, increased rainfall and less snow cover (than the last Ice Age). These changes have a significant impact on the growing, breeding and migration seasons, as well as species abundance and diversity.

=== Land Quality ===
SEPA aims to protect and enhance the quality of Scotland's land through provision of guidance on good land use practice and a variety of regulatory measures.

=== Planning ===
SEPA is identified as a key agency under the Planning etc. (Scotland) Act 2006 and helps deliver the Scottish Government's commitment to providing a more effective and efficient planning system. SEPA also provides formal environmental advice in relation to development plans and on various development proposals across Scotland.

SEPA attempts to enable good development whilst also protecting Scotland's environment through the planning system and takes a consultative approach where they can add most value. The agency tends to favour early engagement with planning authorities to ensure they can support development plan proposals and aid the implementation of a genuinely plan-led land use planning system.

The guidance note "How and when to consult SEPA" provides further information on planning consultation with SEPA.

=== Radioactive substances ===
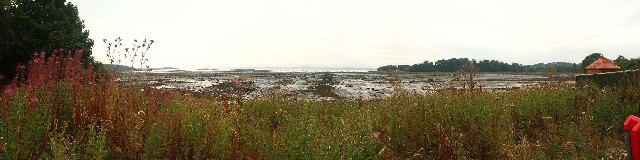
SEPA regulates radioactive substances to protect the environment and human health from potential and actual contamination.

Radioactive substances are used widely in industry, medicine and research in Scotland. Uses can range greatly from the diagnosis and treatment of diseases to use in energy generation and nuclear weapons. However, if radioactive substances are not stored or used properly, they can potentially cause significant human health problems and damage to the environment.

As SEPA has a responsibility for protecting Scotland's environment and human health, it also has responsibility for regulating the storage and use of radioactive substances and the accumulation and disposal of radioactive wastes in Scotland, including functions under the Radioactive Substances Act 1993. The State of Scotland's Environment 2006 Report showed a downward trend in levels of man-made radioactivity in the environment over the last decade.

=== Waste ===
The best way to minimise the negative effects of waste is through waste minimisation and prevention. However, waste can also be put to good use through reuse, recycling, composting and thermal treatment.

Another one of SEPA's statutory duties is to protect the environment and human health in Scotland from the effects of waste management and disposal. SEPA reports on waste data and is also involved in enforcing European compliance schemes. They also support the Scottish Government and other organisations in delivering Scotland's National Waste Plan.

=== Water Quality ===
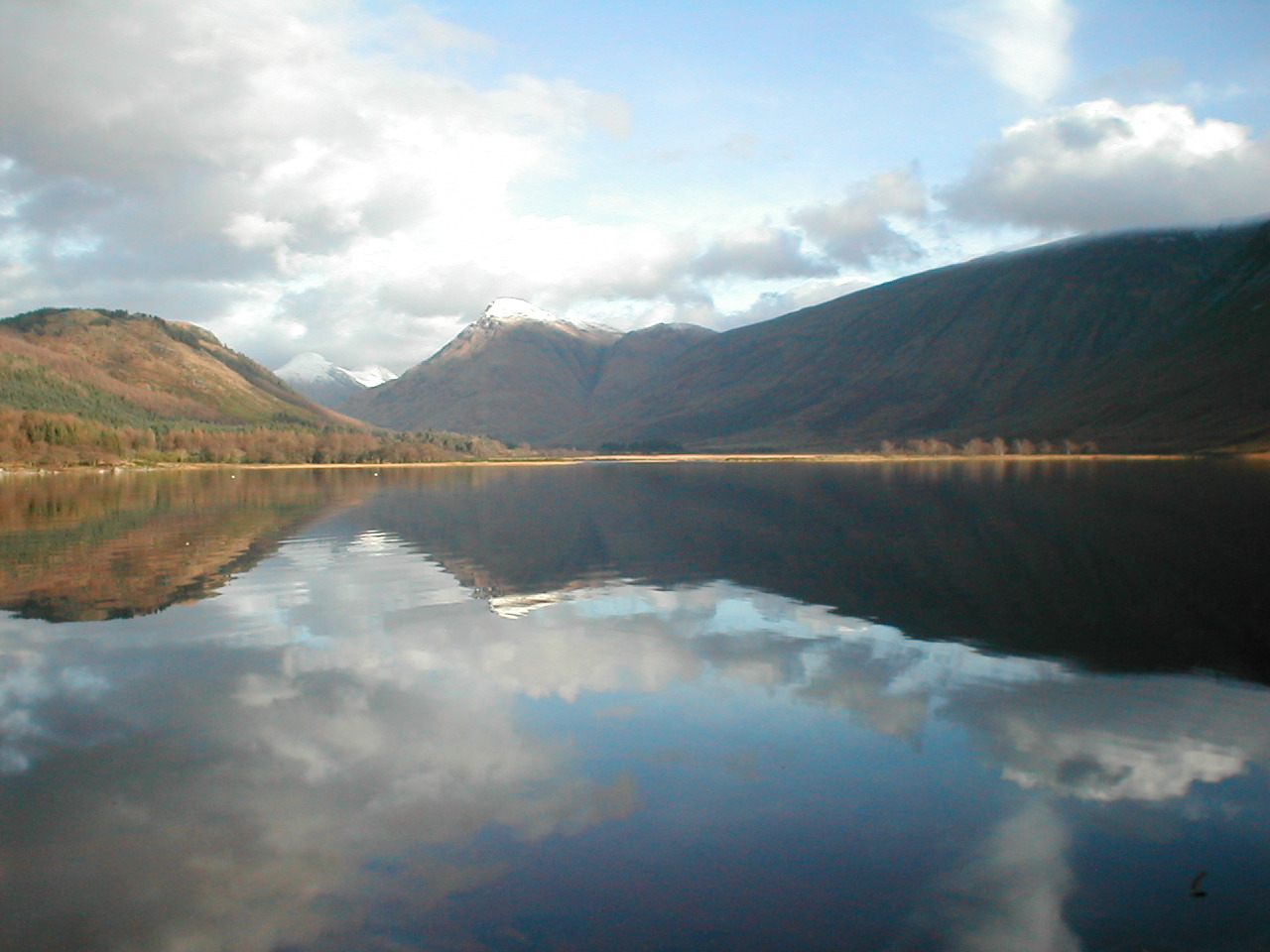
SEPA regulates and protects Scotland's water environment.

Scotland's water environments provide rich sources of drinking water, provide natural habitats, are a focus for leisure and recreation activities and are vital resources for many of Scotland's industries. SEPA helps protect and improve Scotland's water environment through regulation, monitoring and planning.

As mentioned above, SEPA is the flood warning authority for Scotland and they work with other organisations to manage flood risk. SEPA's hydrologists monitor these water levels so that they can warn the public and businesses of the likelihood of a flood.

SEPA provides annual reports on the quality of Scotland's bathing waters. Complying with the European Community (EC) Bathing Water Directive, they also work closely with other organisations to reduce the risk of urban and rural pollution in Scotland's coastal and inland bathing waters.

SEPA regulates other water activities such as discharges to groundwater, discharges to surface water, abstractions, removal of sediments and replacement of weirs.

== Science and research ==
SEPA has a duty to monitor and report on the state of Scotland's environment amd regulate activities affect environmental quality. SEPA publishes a wide range of environmental information and advises Ministers, partner bodies, regulated industry and the public on environmental issues.

=== Sampling ===
SEPA employ experts in many fields of science, including hydrology, chemistry, ecology, algology, ecotoxicology, hydromorphology, hydrogeology, and oceanography to analyse samples collected from across Scotland's air, land and water environments for changes and degradation of the environment or threat to human health. SEPA tests individual chemical parameters and the levels of plants and animals in marine, freshwater and terrestrial habitats. They also conduct analyses of solid waste arisings and audit check analyses of gaseous emissions to the atmosphere.

=== Monitoring ===
In 2009, SEPA was maintaining and operating a significant network of gauging stations and rain gauges to provide national flood warning and forecasting services for Scotland. SEPA holds over 30 years of hydrometric data for Scotland's rivers. These data are invaluable in characterising the long-term pressures on Scotland's environment, particularly in relation to the assessment and management of the consequences of climate change.

SEPA's testing, analysis and interpretation of samples covers a wide range of environments throughout Scotland, including contaminated land, fresh and saline waters, soils and sediments, sewage and industrial effluents, leachates, fauna and biota, and landfill gases.

SEPA operates a formal quality assurance system for its monitoring and assessment functions. Their quality assurance system is compliant with international standards ISO/IEC 17025, ISO 9001:2000, and ISO 14001, and is monitored and externally audited by the United Kingdom Accreditation Service (UKAS) and SGS.

=== Research ===
On 11 December 2008, SEPA launched their Research strategy 2008–2012 which defines their aims, needs and interests in research and development.

== See also ==
- Environmental Standards Scotland
- Geography of Scotland
- Scottish Adjacent Waters Boundaries Order 1999
- COMAH regulations
- NatureScot
- Forestry and Land Scotland
- Environment Agency
