= NatureScot =

Scottish government agency for natural heritage conservation

- NàdarAlba (Scottish Gaelic)

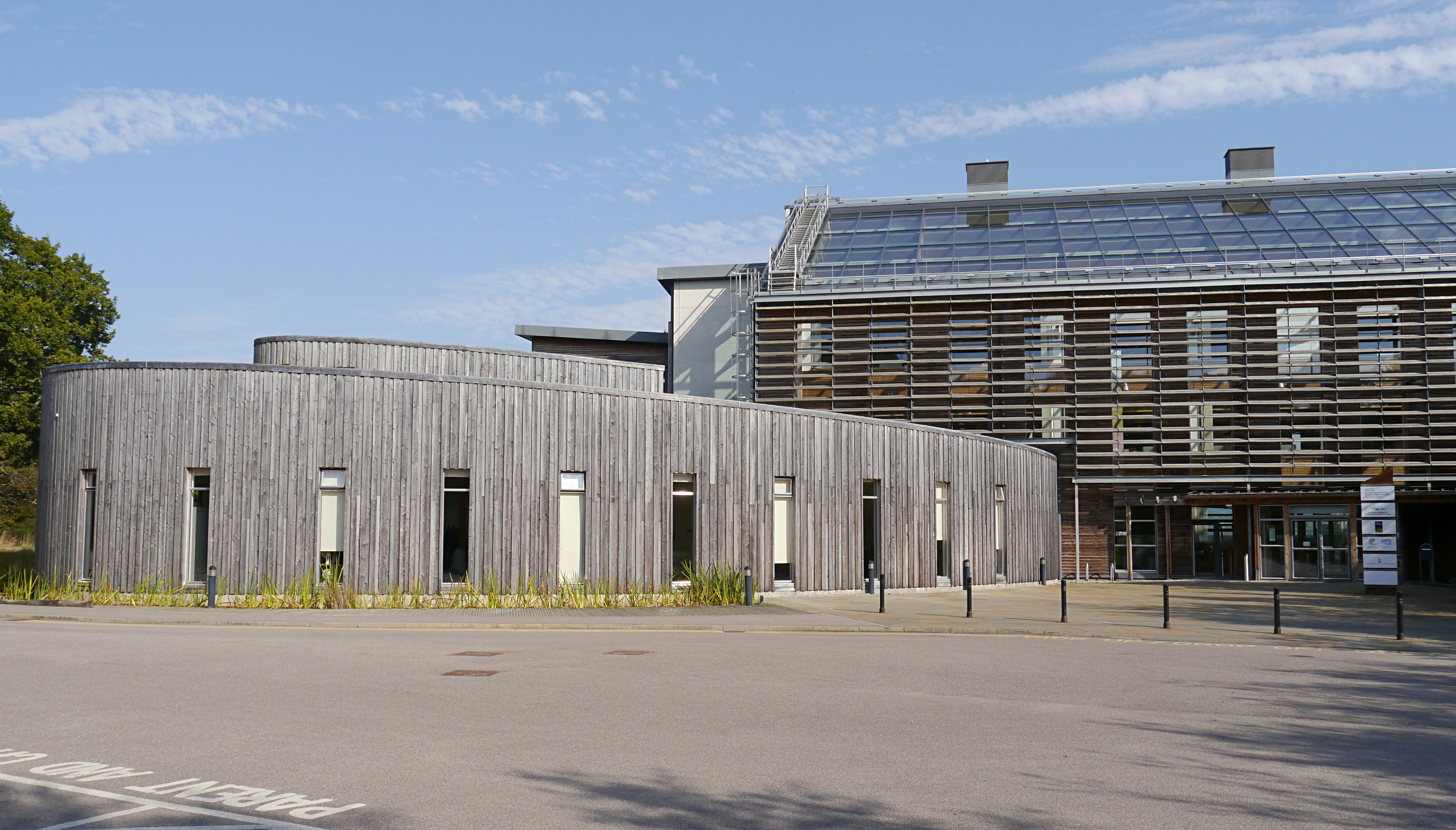
- Great Glen House in Inverness, headquarters of NatureScot

Organisation overview
- Formed: 1992; 34 years ago (as Scottish Natural Heritage)
- Preceding agencies: Nature Conservancy Council for Scotland; Countryside Commission for Scotland
- Type: Executive non-departmental public body
- Jurisdiction: Scotland
- Headquarters: Great Glen House, Inverness
- Employees: 814 (Q4 2024)
- Annual budget: £68.8m (2022–23)
- Organisation executives: Nick Halfhide, Chief Executive; Prof. Colin Galbraith, Chairperson
- Parent department: Scottish Government (Environment and Forestry Directorate)
- Website: www.nature.scot

NatureScot (Scottish Gaelic: NàdarAlba) is an executive non-departmental public body of the Scottish Government responsible for Scotland's natural heritage, especially its natural, genetic and scenic diversity. It advises the Scottish Government on nature conservation, and acts as a government agent in the delivery of conservation designations, i.e. national nature reserves, local nature reserves, national parks, Sites of Special Scientific Interest (SSSIs), Special Areas of Conservation, Special Protection Areas and the national scenic areas. It receives annual funding from the Scottish Government in the form of Grant in Aid to deliver government priorities for Scotland's natural heritage.

NatureScot is the Scottish Government's adviser on all aspects of nature, wildlife management and landscape in Scotland, and also helps the Scottish Government meet its responsibilities under EU environmental laws, particularly in relation to the Habitats Directive and the Birds Directive. The agency currently employs in the region of 700 people, but much of NatureScot's work is carried out in partnership with others including local authorities, government bodies, voluntary environmental bodies, community groups, farmers and land managers. The body has offices in most parts of Scotland including the main islands. NatureScot works closely with the Joint Nature Conservation Committee (JNCC) and the equivalent bodies for England, Wales, and Northern Ireland to ensure a consistent approach to nature conservation throughout the United Kingdom and to fulfilling the United Kingdom's international obligations.

The agency was established in 1992 as Scottish Natural Heritage. In November 2019, it was announced that it would rebrand as NatureScot, a change which took effect on 24 August 2020. The body's statutory name remains Scottish Natural Heritage.

== Roles and responsibilities ==
The general aims of NatureScot as established in the Natural Heritage (Scotland) Act 1991 are to:

- Secure the conservation and enhancement of Scotland's natural heritage;
- Foster understanding and facilitate the enjoyment of Scotland's natural heritage;

For the purposes of the Act, Scotland's natural heritage is defined as the flora and fauna of Scotland, its geological and physiographical features and its natural beauty and amenity. Specific responsibilities of NatureScot include:

- Providing advice to the Scottish government on the development and implementation of policies relevant to the natural heritage of Scotland;
- Disseminating information and advice relating to the natural heritage of Scotland to the public;
- Carrying out and commissioning research relating to the natural heritage of Scotland;
- Establishing, maintaining and managing designated areas of conservation in Scotland;

=== Protected areas ===
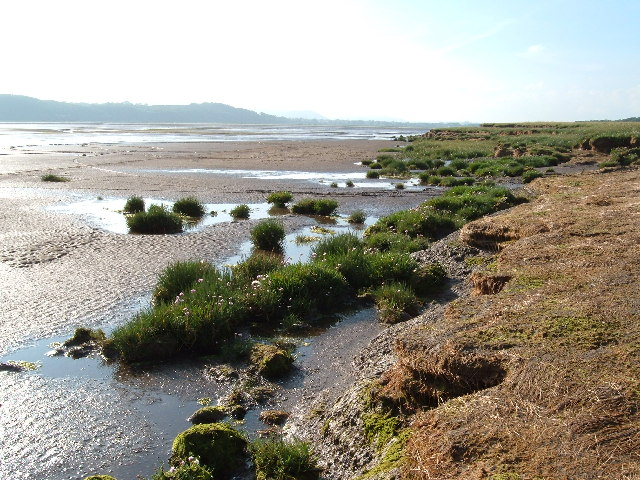
Caerlaverock is a national nature reserve managed by NatureScot.

NatureScot has responsibility for the delivery of conservation designations in Scotland, i.e. national nature reserves, local nature reserves, long distance routes, national parks, Sites of Special Scientific Interest (SSSIs), Special Areas of Conservation, Special Protection Areas and the national scenic areas. The conservation designations overlap considerably with many protected areas covered by multiple designations. In total around 20% of the area of Scotland is covered by some form of protected area designation, with SSSIs alone covering 13%.

==== National nature reserves ====
National nature reserves (NNRs) are areas of land or water designated under the Wildlife and Countryside Act 1981 to contain habitats and species of national importance. NNRs can be owned by public, private, community or voluntary organisations but must be managed to conserve their important habitats and species, as well as providing opportunities for the public to enjoy and engage with nature. There are currently 43 NNRs in Scotland, which cover 154,250 hectares (1,542.5 km^{2}).

NatureScot is responsible for designating NNRs in Scotland and for overseeing their maintenance and management. The majority of NNRs are directly managed by NatureScot; however, some are managed by, or in co-operation with other bodies, including the National Trust for Scotland (7 NNRs), Forestry and Land Scotland (5 NNRs), the RSPB (5 NNRs), the Scottish Wildlife Trust (1 NNR), South Lanarkshire Council (1 NNR), and the Woodland Trust (1 NNR).

All NNRs in Scotland are also designated as Sites of Special Scientific Interest. Many also form part of the Natura 2000 network, which covers Special Protection Areas and Special Areas of Conservation. Additionally, some of the NNRs are designated as Ramsar sites.

==== National scenic areas ====
There are 40 national scenic areas (NSAs) in Scotland, covering 13% of the land area of Scotland. The 40 NSAs were originally identified in 1978 by the Countryside Commission for Scotland in 1978 as areas of "national scenic significance... of unsurpassed attractiveness which must be conserved as part of our national heritage".

=== Protected species ===
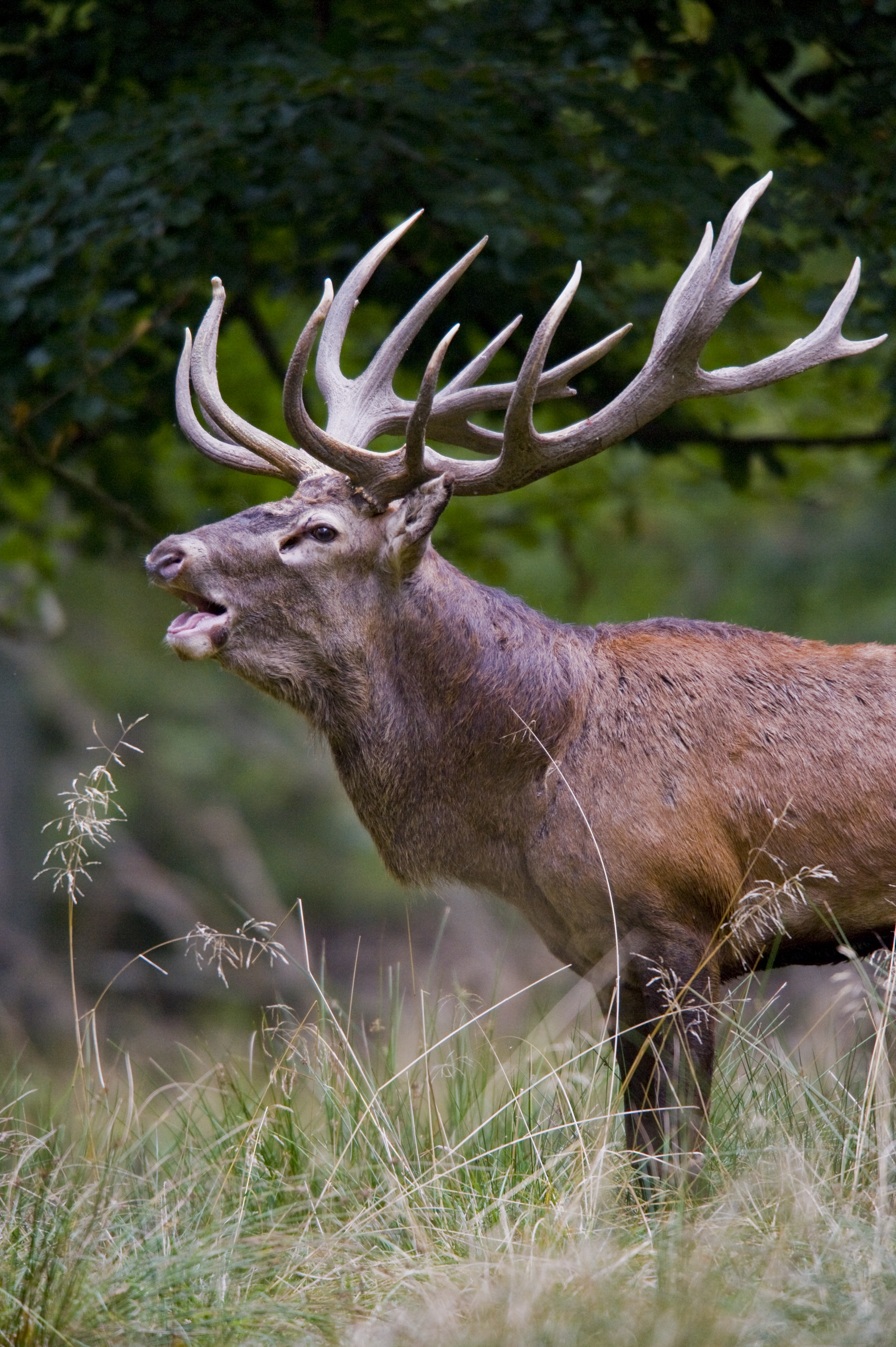
NatureScot issues licences to cull red deer following its merger with the Deer Commission for Scotland.

Vulnerable plant and animal species in Scotland are protected under various legislation. In many cases it is an offence to kill or capture members of a protected animal species, or to uproot plants. NatureScot's primary role in regard to protected species is to license activities that would otherwise be an offence.

=== Enjoying the outdoors ===
NatureScot is responsible for promoting public access and enjoyment of the outdoors. It created and updates the Scottish Outdoor Access Code, which provides detailed guidance on the exercise of the ancient tradition of universal access to land in Scotland, which was formally codified by the Land Reform (Scotland) Act 2003. It also hosts the National Access Forum, which brings together all bodies with an interest in land access issues.

NatureScot also support the management of the three regional parks. It acts as the "custodian" of Scotland's Great Trails, maintaining the official list and providing some finance and publicity to the trails, although responsibility for creating and maintaining each route lies with the local authorities through which a route passes.

== Governance ==
NatureScot is governed by its board. As of August 2022, the board is made up of twelve members and is chaired by Prof Colin Galbraith. Board members are appointed by Scottish Government ministers for an initial term of four years and normally serve a maximum of two terms. The primary roles of the board are to determine the objectives, strategies and policies of NatureScot in respect to its statutory obligations and guidance from the Scottish Government. Meetings of the NatureScot Board are open to the public to attend as observers.

Day-to-day operations are led by the Senior Leadership Team, consisting of a chief executive, who is appointed by the board, and a number of directors and deputy directors. As of April 2025 the Senior Leadership Team comprised:

- Chief Executive and Accountable Officer: Nick Halfhide (interim)
- Director of Business Services and Transformation: Jane Macdonald
- Director of Green Economy: Robbie Kernahan
- Director of Nature and Climate Change: Eileen Stuart (interim)
- Deputy Director of Green Economy: Claudia Rowse
- Deputy Director of Nature and Climate Change: Stuart MacQuarrie
- Head of External Affairs: Jason Ormiston
- Deputy Director of Business Services and Transformation: Marie Hernandez

Supporting the Board are three committee, the Scientific Advisory Committee, the Protected Areas Committee, and the Audit and Risk Committee.

NatureScot programmes and priorities have a strong focus on helping to deliver the Scottish Government's National Outcomes and Targets which comprise the National Performance Framework. NatureScot is also a member of SEARS (Scotland's Environmental and Rural Services).

== History ==
Former logo of Scottish Natural Heritage

The agency was formed as Scottish Natural Heritage (SNH) in 1992 from the amalgamation of the Nature Conservancy Council for Scotland and the Countryside Commission for Scotland to "secure the conservation and enhancement of, and to foster understanding and facilitate the enjoyment of the natural heritage of Scotland".

In March 2003, Scottish Ministers announced their decision to transfer SNH's headquarters from Edinburgh to Inverness, with around 270 jobs to be transferred. Prior to the move, relocation costs were variously estimated at between £22 million and £40 million. The decision to transfer SNH's headquarters was heavily criticized by MSPs, unions, Edinburgh civic leaders and staff. Criticism focused on the cost of the move, the disruption to staff and the risk of compromising the effectiveness of SNH's work. Up to 75% of headquarters staff were reported to be against the move. Relocation took place between 2003 and 2006, many staff left at this point as they did not wish to, or were unable to transfer location.

In 2006, SNH headquarters staff moved into Great Glen House, a £15 million purpose-built headquarters building in Inverness. Great Glen House was built by Robertson Property, working with Keppie Design. As part of the tendering process, SNH set seven environmental and sustainability criteria for the design including achieving an 'Excellent' rating under the BREEAM system. The final design met all criteria and achieved the highest ever BREEAM rating for a public building in the UK.

On 1 August 2010, the functions of the Deer Commission for Scotland were transferred to SNH by section 1 of the Public Services (Reform) (Scotland) Act 2010 and the Commission was dissolved.

In 2020 SNH was re-branded as NatureScot.

In 2023, a nature investment partnership was started to deliver private investment for nature restoration programme, to seek up to £2 billion of private financing to plant native trees and restore degraded peatland. The scheme was largely for investors to plant new forests and pay landowners rent, to later share profits from the sale of carbon credits. The Aberdeen Group considered investing £100 million, with the UK National Wealth Fund co-funding £50 million. In 2026, Aberdeen decided to withdraw from the partnership because the scheme would produce insufficient returns.

== Projects ==
In support of its statutory duties, NatureScot undertakes many individual projects across Scotland, often in collaboration with land managers, charities and local communities.

=== Stoat eradication project ===
The introduction of alien stoats since 2010 has created serious problems for native species in Orkney:

The introduction of a ground predator like the stoat to islands such as Orkney, where there are no native ground predators, is very bad news for Orkney's native species. Stoats are accomplished predators and pose a very serious threat to Orkney's wildlife, including: the native Orkney vole, hen harrier, short-eared owl and many ground nesting birds

— NatureScot

In 2018, a stoat eradication project was presented by NatureScot to be applied "across Orkney Mainland, South Ronaldsay, Burray, Glimps Holm, Lamb Holm and Hunda, and the biosecurity activities delivered on the non-linked islands of the archipelago". The project, which is run by a partnership including NatureScot, RSPB Scotland and Orkney Islands Council, uses "humane DOC150 and DOC200 traps". A report issued in October 2020 stated that over 5,000 traps had been deployed. Specifics were provided as to the locations.

Not all was going well as of 15 January 2021, according to The Times which stated that the project "has been hit by alleged sabotage after the destruction and theft of traps that have also killed and injured household pets and other animals" but added that the £6 million programme was supported by most islanders. Another news item stated that some of the traps had "caught and killed family pets as well as hundreds of other animals". A subsequent report confirmed that "Police Scotland is investigating a number of incidents involving damage to and the theft of stoat traps in Orkney".

== See also ==
- Environmental Standards Scotland
- National nature reserve (Scotland)
- Scottish Environment Protection Agency
