= List of Liberal Democrat members of the Scottish Parliament =

This is a list of Scottish Liberal Democrats MSPs. It includes all members of the Scottish Parliament (MSPs) who represented the Scottish Liberal Democrats (aka "Lib Dems") in the Scottish Parliament.

== List of MSPs ==
Name	Constituency or region	Type	Start year	End year
Andrew Arbuckle	Mid Scotland and Fife	Region	2005 (Note: Keith Raffan resigned from the Scottish Parliament on 10 January 2005. His seat was filled by the next-placed candidate on the LibDems Mid Scotland and Fife list: Andrew Arbuckle.)	2007
Andrew Baxter	Skye, Lochaber and Badenoch	Constituency	2026	
Robert Brown	Glasgow	Region	1999	2011
Yi-pei Chou Turvey	North East Scotland	Region	2026	
Alex Cole-Hamilton	Edinburgh Western	Constituency	2016	2026
Alex Cole-Hamilton	Edinburgh North Western	Constituency	2026	
Sanne Dijkstra-Downie	Edinburgh Northern	Constituency	2026	
Duncan Dunlop	South Scotland	Region	2026	
Ross Finnie	West Scotland	Region	1999	2011
Donald Gorrie	Central Scotland	Region	1999	2007
David Green	Caithness, Sutherland and Ross	Constituency	2026	
Jamie Greene	West Scotland	Region	2025	2026
Adam Harley	Strathkelvin and Bearsden	Constituency	2026	
Jim Hume	South of Scotland	Region	2007	2011
Jim Hume	South Scotland	Region	2011	2016
Ian Jenkins	Tweeddale, Ettrick and Lauderdale	Constituency	1999	2003
George Lyon	Argyll and Bute	Constituency	1999	2007
Liam McArthur	Orkney	Constituency	2007	
Alison McInnes	North East Scotland	Region	2007	2016
Morven-May MacCallum	Highlands and Islands	Region	2026	
John Farquhar Munro	Ross	Constituency	1999	2011
Hugh O'Donnell	Central Scotland	Region	2007	2011 (Note: Hugh O'Donnell resigned from the Scottish Liberal Democrats on 27 March 2011, and sat as an independent MSP until the May 2011 Scottish Parliament election.)
Mike Pringle	Edinburgh South	Constituency	2003	2011
Jeremy Purvis	Tweeddale, Ettrick and Lauderdale	Constituency	2003	2011
Nora Radcliffe	Gordon	Constituency	1999	2007
Keith Raffan	Mid Scotland and Fife	Region	1999	2005
Willie Rennie	Mid Scotland and Fife	Region	2011	2016
Willie Rennie	North East Fife	Constituency	2016	
Euan Robson	Roxburgh and Berwickshire	Constituency	1999	2007
Mike Rumbles	West Aberdeenshire and Kincardine	Constituency	1999	2011
Mike Rumbles	North East Scotland	Region	2011	2021
Tavish Scott	Shetland	Constituency	1999	2019 (Note: Tavish Scott resigned from the Scottish Parliament on 15 July 2019. The consequent Shetland by-election was held on 29 August 2019, and won by the Liberal Democrat Beatrice Wishart.)
Iain Smith	North East Fife	Constituency	1999	2011
Margaret Smith	Edinburgh West	Constituency	1999	2011
David Steel	Lothians	Constituency	1999	1999 (Note: David Steel was elected as the Scottish Parliament's first Presiding Officer, and promptly suspended his Lib Dem membership for the duration of his tenure as Presiding Office. This election was the first item of business after MSPs were sworn in, so Steel sat as Lib Dem for only a few hours or days.)
Nicol Stephen	Aberdeen South	Constituency	1999	2011
Jamie Stone	Caithness, Sutherland and Easter Ross	Constituency	1999	2011
Jim Tolson	Dunfermline West	Constituency	2007	2011
Jim Wallace	Orkney	Constituency	1999	2007
Beatrice Wishart	Shetland	Constituency	2019	2026
