= Alison McInnes =

Scottish politician (born 1957)

Alison McInnes OBE
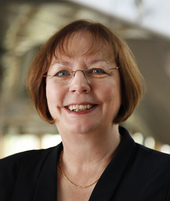

Member of the Scottish Parliament for North East Scotland
- In office 3 May 2007 – 24 March 2016
- Preceded by: David Davidson
- Succeeded by: Mike Rumbles

Personal details
- Born: Irvine, Scotland
- Party: Scottish Liberal Democrats
- Spouse: Husband
- Children: 2 children
- Education: University of Glasgow

Alison McClure McInnes OBE (born 17 July 1957) is a Scottish Liberal Democrat politician. She was the Scottish Liberal Democrat spokesperson for Health and Justice in the Scottish Parliament. She was a Member of the Scottish Parliament (MSP) for the North East Scotland region 2007–2016, when she lost her seat at the 2016 Scottish Parliament election. Whilst in Parliament, McInnes was a member of the Justice Committee and a substitute member of Rural Affairs, Climate Change and Environment Committee of the Scottish Parliament.

== Background ==
Originally from Irvine, Ayrshire, McInnes attended Irvine Royal Academy and McLaren High School, Callendar before studying at the University of Glasgow.

McInnes has lived in Ellon, Aberdeenshire together with her husband for over 25 years. They have two grown-up children.

McInnes says that she takes a keen interest in the arts and is a Fellow of the Royal Society of Arts.

== Career ==
A councillor for 15 years prior to entering parliament, Alison McInnes was first elected to Gordon District Council in 1992. She went on to represent Ellon and District on Aberdeenshire Council between 1995 and 2007, becoming one of the most senior councillors in the region. During this time McInnes chaired the council's infrastructure services committee and Nestrans (North East Regional Transport Partnership).

McInnes has held positions including a non-executive director with Scottish Enterprise and a role on the North Sea Commission, chairing the body's sustainable development group. She has also sat on the area board for Scottish Natural Heritage.

== Member of the Scottish Parliament ==
In the 2007 Scottish Parliament election McInnes stood in Banff and Buchan where she finished fourth, but was elected by the party's regional list. McInnes was a member of the Transport, Infrastructure and Climate Change Committee throughout the 2007–2011 Scottish Parliament and was the Scottish Liberal Democrat spokesperson on these issues. In addition to formal parliamentary business, McInnes has been a member of Cross Party Groups on Climate Change, Oil and Gas, Visual Impairment, Epilepsy, Tibet and Human Rights, and Civil Liberties.

McInnes actively campaigned for infrastructure improvements for the North East, including the Aberdeen Western Peripheral Route, Crossrail and a station at Kintore, and the dualling of the Balmedie-Tipperty section of the A90.

Alison McInnes has taken a leading role in the ongoing campaign for Aberdeenshire and Aberdeen City Councils to receive a 'Fair Share' of local government funding. She also supported Grampian Police and Grampian Fire and Rescue Service in opposing the creation of a single police board and one fire and rescue board for Scotland.

In addition, Alison McInnes's political interests and campaigns include local health care provision, forestry and autism issues. On many of these issues, she has worked alongside community groups, charities and social enterprises, having been involved with voluntary work prior to becoming a councillor in 1992.

In 2011 McInnes stood in the new constituency of Aberdeenshire East where she came second to Alex Salmond. She headed the Lib Dem's list for the North East Scotland region, and returned to Holyrood in that role.

In July 2015, McInnes was replaced as the top candidate on the Lib Dem's regional list for North East Scotland ahead of the 2016 election. In the election the Lib Dems returned one candidate by their North East Scotland regional list, McInnes was not elected.

== Career timeline ==
- 1992–1995: Councillor, Gordon District Council
- 1995–2007: Councillor, Aberdeenshire Council
  - Chair, Infrastructure Services Committee
  - Chair, Nestrans – the Regional Transport Partnership for North East Scotland
- 2007–2016: Member of the Scottish Parliament for North East Scotland
- 2007–2011: Scottish Liberal Democrat spokesperson on Transport, Local Government and Climate Change
- 2011–2012: Scottish Liberal Democrat spokesperson on Health and Justice
- 2012–2016: Scottish Liberal Democrat party business manager and spokesperson for justice.

== Awards and honours ==
McInnes was appointed Officer of the Order of the British Empire (OBE) in the 2013 Birthday Honours for public and political service.
