= Banff and Buchan (disambiguation) =

Banff and Buchan is a committee area of Aberdeenshire Council, and a former district of the Grampian region, Scotland.

Banff and Buchan may also refer to:

- Banff and Buchan (UK Parliament constituency), a constituency represented in the House of Commons of the Parliament of the United Kingdom
- Banff and Buchan (Scottish Parliament constituency), a constituency represented in the Scottish Parliament
