= West Aberdeenshire and Kincardine =

West Aberdeenshire and Kincardine may refer to:

- West Aberdeenshire and Kincardine (UK Parliament constituency)
- West Aberdeenshire and Kincardine (Scottish Parliament constituency)
