= Aberdeen South =

Aberdeen South may refer to:

- Aberdeen South (UK Parliament constituency)
- Aberdeen South (Scottish Parliament constituency)
