= Angus (Scottish Parliament constituency) =

Constituency of the Scottish Parliament

- Former county constituency for the Scottish Parliament
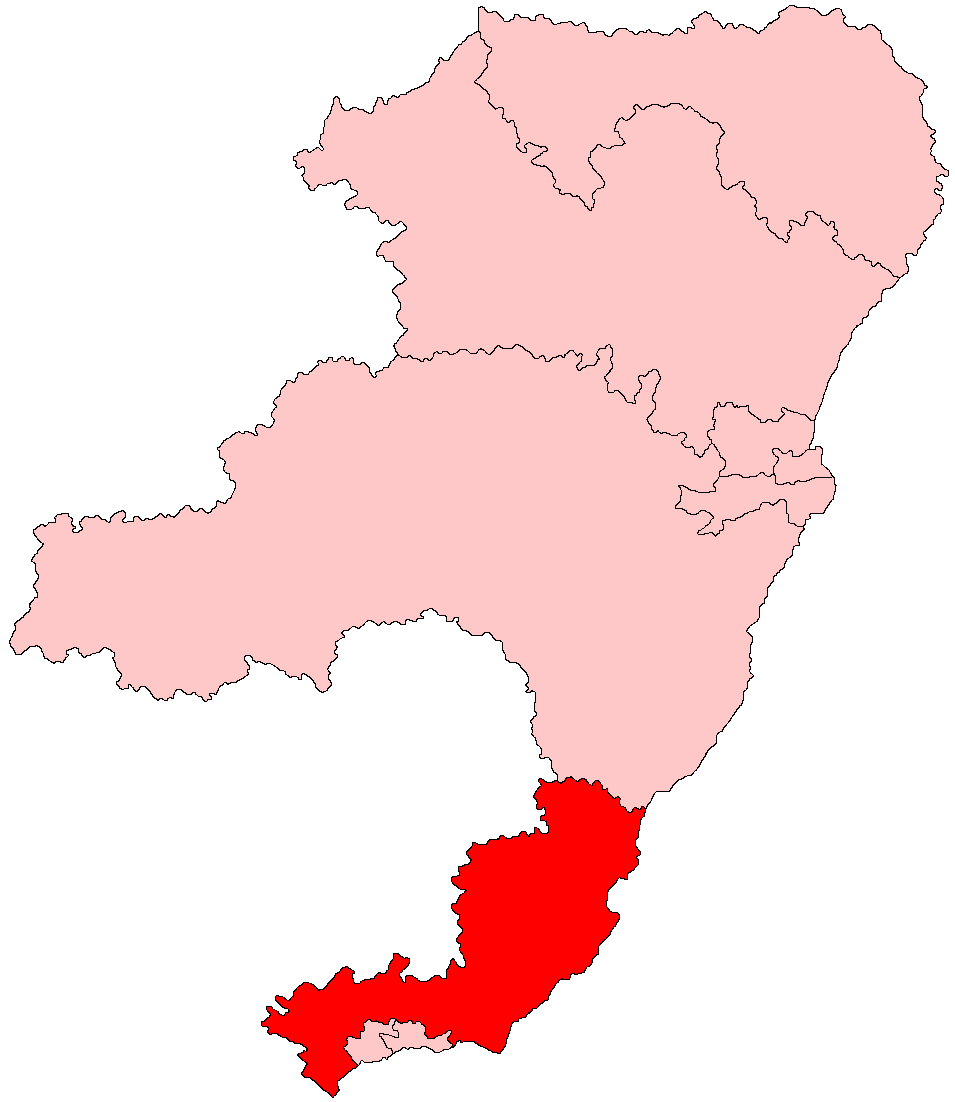

- Angus shown within the North East Scotland electoral region and the region shown within Scotland

Former constituency
- Created: 1999
- Abolished: 2011
- Council area: Angus (part); Dundee City (part); Perth and Kinross (part)
- Replaced by: Angus North and Mearns, Angus South

Angus was a constituency of the Scottish Parliament used between 1999 and 2011. It elected one Member of the Scottish Parliament (MSP) by the first past the post method of election. Under the additional-member electoral system used for elections to the Scottish Parliament it was also one of nine constituencies in the North East Scotland electoral region, which elected seven additional members, in addition to nine constituency MSPs, to produce a form of proportional representation for the region as a whole.

Ahead of the 2011 Scottish Parliament election the Angus constituency was abolished. From 2011 onwards the Angus council area has been covered by two separate constituencies: Angus North and Mearns and Angus South

== Electoral region ==
Until 2011 the other eight constituencies of the North East Scotland region were: Aberdeen Central, Aberdeen North, Aberdeen South, Banff and Buchan, Dundee East, Dundee West, Gordon and West Aberdeenshire and Kincardine. The region covered Aberdeenshire, the Aberdeen City council area, the Dundee City council area, part of Angus, a small part of Moray and a small part of Perth and Kinross.

== Constituency boundaries and council areas ==
The Angus constituency was created at the same time as the Scottish Parliament, for the 1999 Scottish Parliament election, using the name and boundaries of the existing Angus constituency of the UK House of Commons. Ahead of the 2005 United Kingdom general election the boundaries of the House of Commons constituencies in Scotland were altered, and there is no longer any direct link between UK and Scottish Parliament constituencies. Following the First periodic review of Scottish Parliament boundaries ahead of the 2011 Scottish Parliament election, the Angus constituency was abolished, being largely replaced by Angus North and Mearns and Angus South. Some areas covered by the former constituency (being those areas outwith the Angus council area) were instead placed into Perthshire North, Dundee City East and Dundee City West.

The Angus constituency covered a southern portion of the Angus council area, north-eastern and north-western portions of the Dundee City council area and a small eastern portion of the Perth and Kinross council area. The rest of the Angus council area was covered by the North Tayside constituency. The rest of the City of Dundee area was covered by the Dundee West and Dundee East constituencies, and the rest of the Perth and Kinross area was covered by the North Tayside constituency, the Perth constituency and the Ochil constituency. The North Tayside, Perth and Ochil constituencies were all within the Mid Scotland and Fife electoral region.

== Member of the Scottish Parliament ==
The constituency was represented for its entirety by the Scottish National Party MSP Andrew Welsh.

Election	Member	Party
1999	Andrew Welsh	Scottish National Party
2011	constituency abolished: replaced by Angus South	

== Election results ==
2007 Scottish Parliament election: Angus
Party	Candidate	Votes	%	±%
SNP	Andrew Welsh	15,686	49.1	+4.6
Conservative	Alex Johnstone	7,443	23.3	+1.3
Labour	Doug Bradley	5,032	15.7	−0.6
Liberal Democrats	Scott Rennie	3,799	11.9	−0.9
Majority		8,243	25.8	+3.4
Turnout		31,960	53.0	+3.9
SNP hold		Swing		

2003 Scottish Parliament election: Angus
Party	Candidate	Votes	%	±%
SNP	Andrew Welsh	13,251	44.48	−2.0
Conservative	Alex Johnstone	6,564	22.03	+1.3
Labour	John Denning	4,871	16.35	−3.7
Liberal Democrats	Dick Spiers	3,802	12.80	±0.0
Scottish Socialist	Bruce Wallace	1,301	4.37	New
Majority		6,687	22.45	−3.4
Turnout		29,787	49.15	−8.5
SNP hold		Swing		

1999 Scottish Parliament election: Angus
Party	Candidate	Votes	%	±%
SNP	Andrew Welsh	16,055	46.5	N/A
Conservative	Ron Harris	7,154	20.7	N/A
Labour	Ian McFatridge	6,914	20.0	N/A
Liberal Democrats	Dick Spiers	4,413	12.8	N/A
Majority		7,893	25.8	N/A
Turnout		34,536	57.6	N/A
SNP win (new seat)				

== See also ==
- Politics of Dundee
