= Marlyn Glen =

Scottish politician (born 1951)

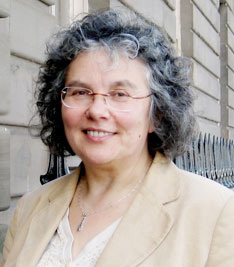
- Glen in 2009

Member of the Scottish Parliament for North East Scotland (1 of 7 Regional MSPs)
- In office 1 May 2003 – 22 March 2011

Personal details
- Born: 30 September 1951 (age 74) Dundee, Scotland
- Party: Scottish Labour Party
- Education: Open University, University of St Andrews

Marlyn Glen (born 30 September 1951) is a Scottish Labour Party politician. She was a Member of the Scottish Parliament (MSP) for the North East Scotland region from 2003 to 2011.

Glen was born in Dundee and educated at Kirkton High School. She attended the University of St Andrews and the University of Dundee, and has also completed several Open University degree courses. Prior to her election to Holyrood, she worked as a teacher in Liverpool, Ayr, Irvine and Dundee and is a member of the Educational Institute of Scotland trade union. She was also a Dundee District Council councillor. Her husband, Neil Glen, was also a councillor and died in 2004. She was also an Honorary Vice President of English-Speaking Union Scotland.

Glen is on the left of the Scottish Labour Party and remains a supporter of the Scottish Campaign for Nuclear Disarmament. She is also a member of Campaign for Socialism that backed John McDonnell's then Jeremy Corbyn's bids for the leadership of the UK Labour Party.
