= Tess White =

Scottish Conservative politician

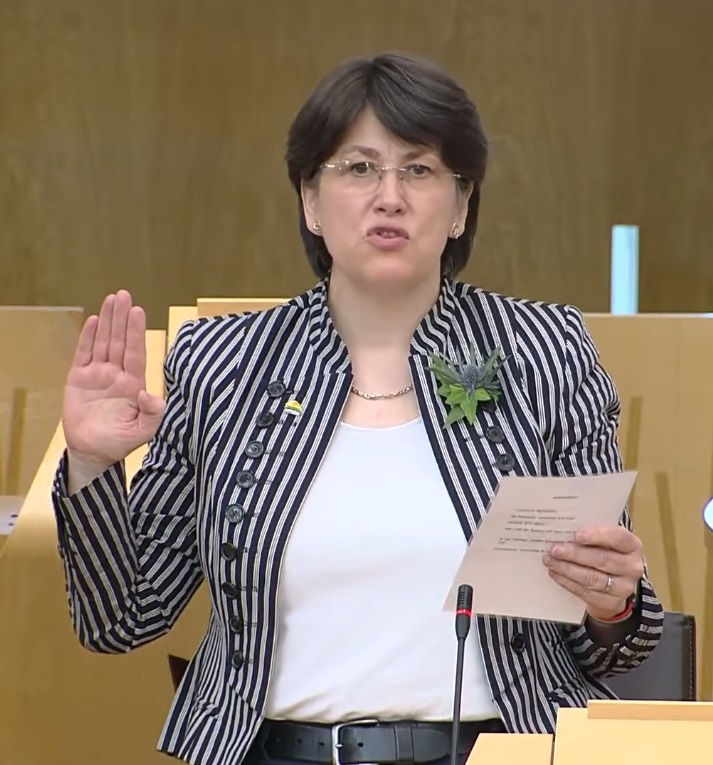
- Swearing in, 2021

Member of the Scottish Parliament for North East Scotland (1 of 7 Regional MSPs)
- In office 6 May 2021 – 9 April 2026

Personal details
- Party: Scottish Conservatives

Tess White is a Scottish Conservative politician, who served as a Member of the Scottish Parliament (MSP) for the North East Scotland region from 2021 to 2026.

== Career ==
White worked in the oil and gas industry and served as a board director at Shell Renewables, vice president of Shell International and HR director at Centrica.

== Political career ==
White unsuccessfully stood as the Conservative candidate for Dundee West at the 2019 United Kingdom general election, where she came in third with 5,149 votes (12.4%).

=== Member of the Scottish Parliament ===
White ran as the Conservative candidate for Dundee City West at the 2021 Scottish Parliament election, finishing third, with 10.3% of the vote. She was elected on the regional list in North East Scotland.

White was appointed Shadow Minister for Equalities for the Scottish Conservative and Unionist Party in autumn 2024 and sits on the Equalities, Human Rights and Civil Justice Committee in the Scottish Parliament. White lodged a motion to remove Green MSP Maggie Chapman from the Committee after her comments at a protest in Aberdeen that “bigotry, prejudice and hatred” is “coming from the Supreme Court and from so many other institutions in our society”. The Faculty of Advocates said Ms Chapman's remarks failed "to respect the Rule of Law".

White was previously Shadow Minister for Public Health, Women’s Health and Sport and a member of the Health, Social Care and Sport Committee. She helped to lead a cross-party campaign to introduce life-saving testing for pre-eclampsia across Scotland for expectant mothers. She sits on several cross-party groups, including Renewable Energy and Energy Efficiency, Sport, Women’s Health, and Men’s Violence Against Women and Girls.

During a session of First Ministers' Questions on 2 September 2021, First Minister Nicola Sturgeon was answering a question about anti-Irish and anti-Catholic discrimination in Scotland. As Sturgeon said "...anybody who chooses to live in Scotland [...] this is their home", White interrupted and shouted across the chamber, "unless you're English". She later apologised and withdrew her remark in the parliamentary chamber.

On 12 January 2022, White called for Boris Johnson to resign as Conservative party leader and Prime Minister over the Westminster lockdown parties controversy along with a majority of Scottish Conservative MSPs.

In May 2025, White was selected as the Conservative candidate for Angus North and Mearns for the 2026 Scottish Parliament election. On 2 September 2025, however, she announced that, due to health reasons, she would be withdrawing her candidacy, and would therefore not seek re-election as an MSP.

White was nominated as Backbencher of the Year and Political Hero of the Year, along with Claire Baker MSP and Michelle Thomson MSP, as part of the Holyrood Political Awards 2025.

== Personal life ==
White is a lesbian and has a wife. She is also a 2nd Dan Black Belt in Karate, as well as a keen golfer and swimmer.
