= Dundee West (Scottish Parliament constituency) =

Region or constituency of the Scottish Parliament

- Former burgh constituency for the Scottish Parliament
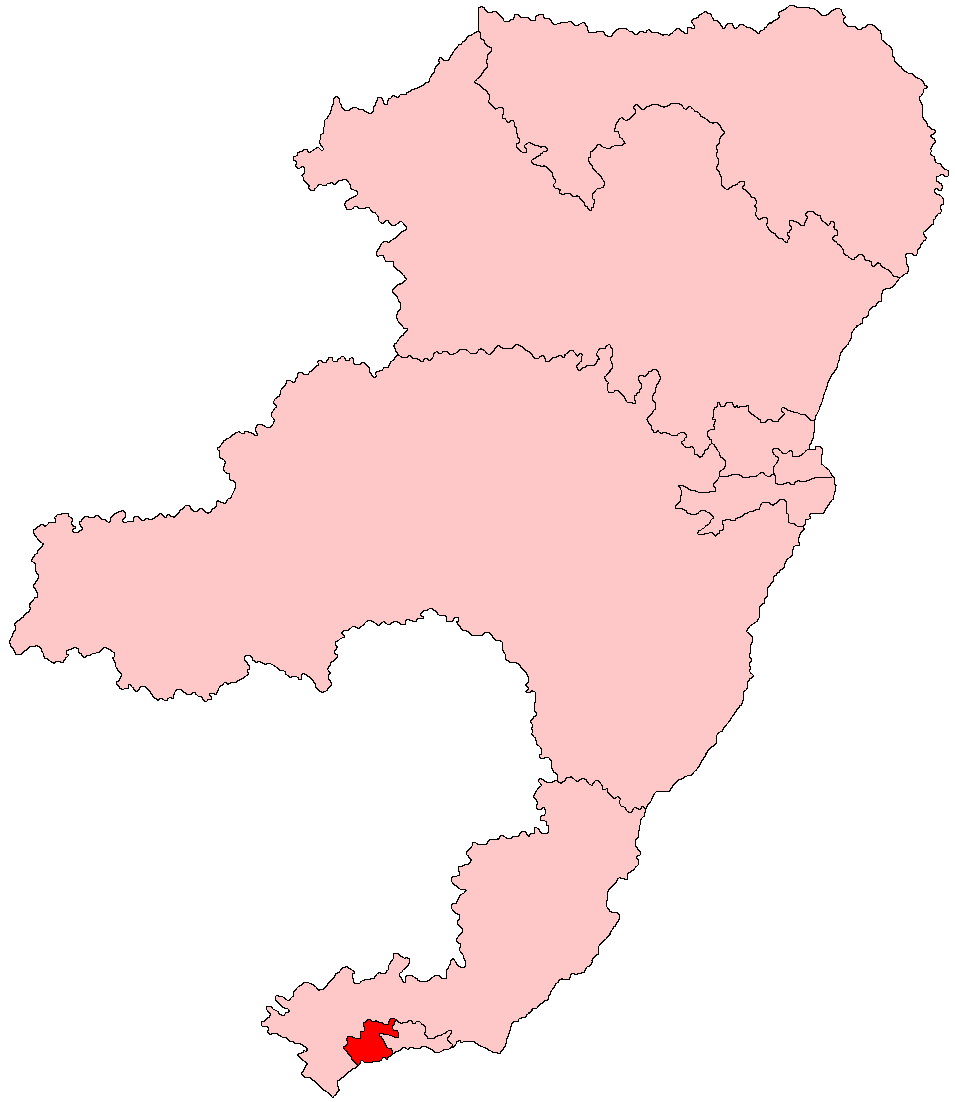

- Dundee West shown within the North East Scotland electoral region and the region shown within Scotland

Former constituency
- Created: 1999
- Abolished: 2011
- Council area: Dundee City (part)
- Replaced by: Dundee City West

Dundee West was a constituency of the Scottish Parliament (Holyrood). It elected one Member of the Scottish Parliament (MSP) by the first past the post method of election. Also, however, it was one of nine constituencies in the North East Scotland electoral region, which elects seven additional members, in addition to nine constituency MSPs, to produce a form of proportional representation for the region as a whole.

From the Scottish Parliament election, 2011, Dundee West was redrawn and renamed Dundee City West

== Electoral region ==
The other eight constituencies of the North East Scotland region included: Aberdeen Central, Aberdeen North, Aberdeen South, Angus, Banff and Buchan, Dundee East, Gordon and West Aberdeenshire and Kincardine

The region covers the Aberdeenshire council area, the Aberdeen City council area, the Dundee City council area, part of the Angus council area, a small part of the Moray council area and a small part of the Perth and Kinross council area.

== Constituency boundaries ==
The Dundee West constituency was created at the same time as the Scottish Parliament, in 1999, with the name and boundaries of an existing Westminster constituency. In 2005, however, the boundaries of the Westminster (House of Commons) constituency were subject to some alteration.

Renamed Dundee City West for the 2011 elections, the electoral wards used in the newly shaped constituency are:

- In full: Strathmartine, Lochee, West End
- In part: Coldside, Maryfield, North East

=== Council area ===
The Holyrood constituency was within the Dundee City council area, which was divided between three North East Scotland constituencies. Dundee West and Dundee East were within the city area. The Angus constituency covered north-eastern and north-western areas of the city, as well as a southern portion of the Angus council area and a small eastern portion of the Perth and Kinross council area.

== Member of the Scottish Parliament ==
Election	Member	Party
1999	Kate Maclean	Scottish Labour Party
2007	Joe FitzPatrick	Scottish National Party
2011	constituency abolished: see Dundee City West	

== Election results ==
These results are for Dundee West. For candidates and results from 2011, see Dundee City West

2007 Scottish Parliament election: Dundee West
Party	Candidate	Votes	%	±%
SNP	Joe FitzPatrick	10,955	45.1	+16.4
Labour	Jill Shimi	9,009	37.1	+4.2
Liberal Democrats	Michael Charlton	2,517	10.4	+2.9
Conservative	Belinda Don	1,787	7.4	+1.9
Majority		1,946	8.0	N/A
Turnout		24,268	48.8	+0.1
Rejected ballots		978		
SNP gain from Labour		Swing	+6.1	

2003 Scottish Parliament election: Dundee West
Party	Candidate	Votes	%	±%
Labour	Kate Maclean	8,234	32.9	−4.7
SNP	Irene McGugan	7,168	28.7	−8.5
Independent	Ian Borthwick	4,715	18.9	New
Liberal Democrats	Shona Ferrier	1,878	7.5	−2.8
Scottish Socialist	Jim McFarlane	1,501	6.0	+2.6
Conservative	Victoria Roberts	1,376	5.5	−6.0
Scottish People's	Morag MacLechan	131	0.5	New
Majority		1,066	4.2	+3.8
Turnout		25,003	48.7	−3.5
Labour hold		Swing		

1999 Scottish Parliament election: Dundee West
Party	Candidate	Votes	%	±%
Labour	Kate Maclean	10,925	37.6	N/A
SNP	Calum Cashley	10,804	37.2	N/A
Conservative	Gordon Buchan	3,345	11.5	N/A
Liberal Democrats	Elizabeth Dick	2,998	10.3	N/A
Scottish Socialist	Jim McFarlane	1,010	3.4	N/A
Majority		121	0.4	N/A
Turnout		29,082	51.2	N/A
Labour win (new seat)				

== See also ==
- Politics of Dundee
