= North East Scotland (Scottish Parliament electoral region) =

Scottish Parliament electoral region

- electoral region for the Scottish Parliament
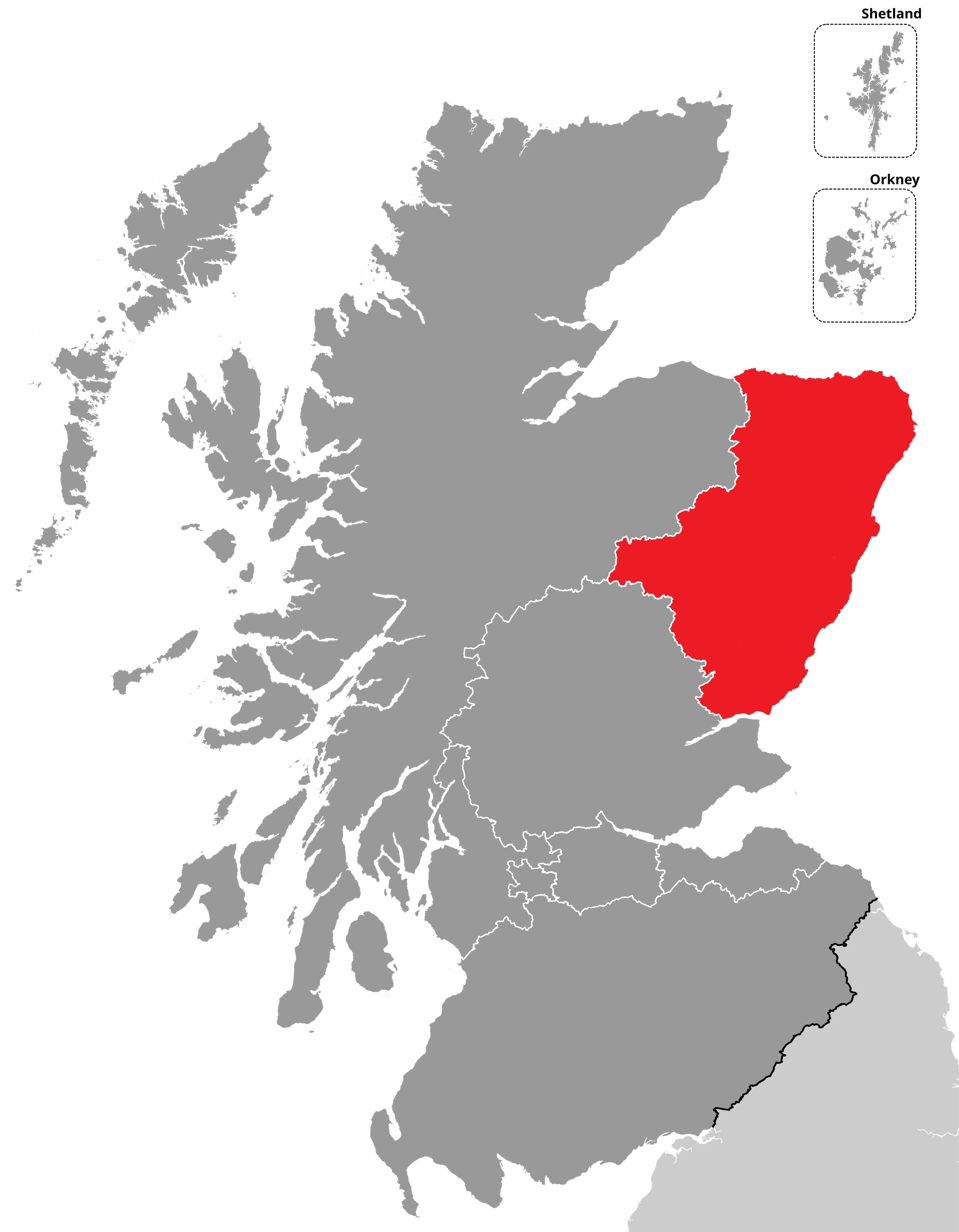
- North East Scotland shown within Scotland
- Electorate: 589,084 (2022)

Current electoral region
- Created: 1999
- MSPs: Scottish National Party 9; Conservative 3; Reform UK 2; Labour 1; Scottish Greens 1; Liberal Democrats 1
- Council areas: Aberdeen City; Aberdeenshire; Angus; Dundee City; Moray (part)
- Constituencies: Aberdeen Central; Aberdeen Deeside and North Kincardine; Aberdeen Donside; Aberdeenshire East; Aberdeenshire West; Angus North and Mearns; Angus South; Banffshire and Buchan Coast; Dundee City East; Dundee City West

North East Scotland is one of the eight electoral regions of the Scottish Parliament which were created in 1999. Ten of the parliament's 73 first past the post constituencies are sub-divisions of the region. Under the additional-member electoral system used for elections to the Scottish Parliament, the region elects seven regional Members of the Scottish Parliament (MSPs), in addition to the ten constituency MSPs, to produce a form of proportional representation for the region as a whole, which thus elects a total of 17 MSPs.

The North East Scotland region shares boundaries with the Highlands and Islands and Mid Scotland and Fife regions.

== Constituencies and local government areas ==
=== 2026–present ===
Following the Second Periodic Review of Scottish Parliament Boundaries, boundaries for Scotland's electoral regions and constituencies were redrawn ahead the 2026 Scottish Parliament election. North East Scotland saw a very minor change in its boundary with the Highlands and Islands region, as result of changes to the boundary between the Moray and Banffshire and Buchan Coast constituencies, but was otherwise left unchanged.

Region	Constituencies from 2026
	1. Aberdeen Central; 2. Aberdeen Deeside and North Kincardine; 3. Aberdeen Donside; 4. Aberdeenshire East; 5. Aberdeenshire West; 6. Angus North and Mearns; 7. Angus South; 8. Banffshire and Buchan Coast; 9. Dundee City East; 10. Dundee City West

=== 2011–2026 ===
As a result of the First Periodic Review of Scottish Parliament Boundaries the boundaries of the region and constituencies were redrawn for the 2011 Scottish Parliament election.

Region	Constituencies
	1. Aberdeen Central; 2. Aberdeen Donside; 3. Aberdeen South and North Kincardine; 4. Aberdeenshire East; 5. Aberdeenshire West; 6. Angus North and Mearns; 7. Angus South; 8. Banffshire and Buchan Coast; 9. Dundee City East; 10. Dundee City West

=== 1999–2011 ===
In terms of first past the post constituencies the region covered:

Region	Constituencies
	1. Aberdeen Central; 2. Aberdeen North; 3. Aberdeen South; 4. Angus; 5. Banff and Buchan; 6. Dundee East; 7. Dundee West; 8. Gordon; 9. West Aberdeenshire and Kincardine

The constituencies were created in 1999 with the names and boundaries of Westminster constituencies, as existing in at that time. Scottish Westminster constituencies were mostly replaced with new constituencies in 2005

In terms of local government areas the region covers:

- Aberdeenshire
- Aberdeen City
- Dundee City
- part of Angus (otherwise within the Mid Scotland and Fife electoral region)
- a small part of Moray (otherwise within the Highlands and Islands electoral region)
- a small part of Perth and Kinross (otherwise within the Mid Scotland and Fife electoral region)

== Members of the Scottish Parliament ==
=== Constituency MSPs ===
Term	Election	Aberdeen Central	Aberdeen North	Aberdeen South	Gordon	West Aberdeenshire and Kincardine	Angus		Banff and Buchan	Dundee East	Dundee West
1st	1999	Lewis MacDonald (Labour)	Elaine Thomson (Labour)	Nicol Stephen (Lib Dem)	Nora Radcliffe (Lib Dem)	Mike Rumbles (Lib Dem)	Andrew Welsh (SNP)		Alex Salmond (SNP)	John McAllion (Labour)	Kate Maclean (Labour)
1st	2001 by	Lewis MacDonald (Labour)	Elaine Thomson (Labour)	Nicol Stephen (Lib Dem)	Nora Radcliffe (Lib Dem)	Mike Rumbles (Lib Dem)	Andrew Welsh (SNP)		Stewart Stevenson (SNP)	John McAllion (Labour)	Kate Maclean (Labour)
2nd	2003	Lewis MacDonald (Labour)	Brian Adam (SNP)	Nicol Stephen (Lib Dem)	Nora Radcliffe (Lib Dem)	Mike Rumbles (Lib Dem)	Andrew Welsh (SNP)		Stewart Stevenson (SNP)	Shona Robison (SNP)	Kate Maclean (Labour)
3rd	2007	Lewis MacDonald (Labour)	Brian Adam (SNP)	Nicol Stephen (Lib Dem)	Alex Salmond (SNP)	Mike Rumbles (Lib Dem)	Andrew Welsh (SNP)		Stewart Stevenson (SNP)	Shona Robison (SNP)	Joe FitzPatrick (SNP)
Term	Election	Aberdeen Central	Aberdeen Donside	Aberdeen South and North Kincardine	Aberdeenshire East	Aberdeenshire West	Angus North and Mearns	Angus South	Banffshire and Buchan Coast	Dundee City East	Dundee City West
4th	2011	Kevin Stewart (SNP)	Brian Adam (SNP)	Maureen Watt (SNP)	Alex Salmond (SNP)	Dennis Robertson (SNP)	Nigel Don (SNP)	Graeme Dey (SNP)	Stewart Stevenson (SNP)	Shona Robison (SNP)	Joe FitzPatrick (SNP)
4th	2013 by	Kevin Stewart (SNP)	Mark McDonald (SNP) (later independent)	Maureen Watt (SNP)	Alex Salmond (SNP)	Dennis Robertson (SNP)	Nigel Don (SNP)	Graeme Dey (SNP)	Stewart Stevenson (SNP)	Shona Robison (SNP)	Joe FitzPatrick (SNP)
5th	2016	Kevin Stewart (SNP)	Mark McDonald (SNP) (later independent)	Maureen Watt (SNP)	Gillian Martin (SNP)	Alexander Burnett (Conservative)	Mairi Evans (SNP)	Graeme Dey (SNP)	Stewart Stevenson (SNP)	Shona Robison (SNP)	Joe FitzPatrick (SNP)
5th	2018	Kevin Stewart (SNP)	Mark McDonald (SNP) (later independent)	Maureen Watt (SNP)	Gillian Martin (SNP)	Alexander Burnett (Conservative)	Mairi Evans (SNP)	Graeme Dey (SNP)	Stewart Stevenson (SNP)	Shona Robison (SNP)	Joe FitzPatrick (SNP)
6th	2021	Kevin Stewart (SNP)	Jackie Dunbar (SNP)	Audrey Nicoll (SNP)	Gillian Martin (SNP)	Alexander Burnett (Conservative)	Mairi Evans (SNP)	Graeme Dey (SNP)	Karen Adam (SNP)	Shona Robison (SNP)	Joe FitzPatrick (SNP)
Term	Election	Aberdeen Central	Aberdeen Donside	Aberdeen Deeside and North Kincardine	Aberdeenshire East	Aberdeenshire West	Angus North and Mearns	Angus South	Banffshire and Buchan Coast	Dundee City East	Dundee City West
7th	2026	Jack Middleton (SNP)	Jackie Dunbar (SNP)	Stephen Flynn (SNP)	Gillian Martin (SNP)	Alexander Burnett (Conservative)	Dawn Black (SNP)	Lloyd Melville (SNP)	Karen Adam (SNP)	Stephen Gethins (SNP)	Heather Anderson (SNP)

=== Regional list MSPs ===
N.B. This table is for presentation purposes only

Parliament	Year	MSP	MSP	MSP	MSP	MSP	MSP	MSP
1st	1999	Shona Robison (SNP)	Brian Adam (SNP)	Irene McGugan (SNP)	Richard Lochhead (SNP)	Alex Johnstone (Conservative)	Ben Wallace (Conservative)	David Davidson (Conservative)
2nd	2003	Marlyn Glen (Labour)	Shiona Baird (Green)	Richard Baker (Labour)	Richard Lochhead (SNP)	Alex Johnstone (Conservative)	Nanette Milne (Conservative)	David Davidson (Conservative)
2nd	2006	Marlyn Glen (Labour)	Shiona Baird (Green)	Richard Baker (Labour)	Maureen Watt (SNP)	Alex Johnstone (Conservative)	Nanette Milne (Conservative)	David Davidson (Conservative)
3rd	2007	Marlyn Glen (Labour)	Nigel Don (SNP)	Richard Baker (Labour)	Maureen Watt (SNP)	Alex Johnstone (Conservative)	Nanette Milne (Conservative)	Alison McInnes (Lib Dem)
4th	2011	Jenny Marra (Labour)	Lewis MacDonald (Labour)	Richard Baker (Labour)	Mark McDonald (SNP)	Alex Johnstone (Conservative)	Nanette Milne (Conservative)	Alison McInnes (Lib Dem)
4th	2013	Jenny Marra (Labour)	Lewis MacDonald (Labour)	Richard Baker (Labour)	Christian Allard (SNP)	Alex Johnstone (Conservative)	Nanette Milne (Conservative)	Alison McInnes (Lib Dem)
4th	2016	Jenny Marra (Labour)	Lewis MacDonald (Labour)	Lesley Brennan (Labour)	Christian Allard (SNP)	Alex Johnstone (Conservative)	Nanette Milne (Conservative)	Alison McInnes (Lib Dem)
5th	2016	Jenny Marra (Labour)	Lewis MacDonald (Labour)	Ross Thomson (Conservative)	Peter Chapman (Conservative)	Alex Johnstone (Conservative)	Liam Kerr (Conservative)	Mike Rumbles (Lib Dem)
5th	2016	Jenny Marra (Labour)	Lewis MacDonald (Labour)	Ross Thomson (Conservative)	Peter Chapman (Conservative)	Bill Bowman (Conservative)	Liam Kerr (Conservative)	Mike Rumbles (Lib Dem)
5th	2017	Jenny Marra (Labour)	Lewis MacDonald (Labour)	Tom Mason (Conservative)	Peter Chapman (Conservative)	Bill Bowman (Conservative)	Liam Kerr (Conservative)	Mike Rumbles (Lib Dem)
6th	2021	Michael Marra (Labour)	Mercedes Villalba (Labour)	Maurice Golden (Conservative)	Tess White (Conservative)	Douglas Lumsden (Conservative)	Liam Kerr (Conservative)	Maggie Chapman (Green)
7th	2026	Michael Marra (Labour)	Yi-pei Chou Turvey (Lib Dem)	Duncan Massey (Reform)	Mark Simpson (Reform)	Douglas Lumsden (Conservative)	Liam Kerr (Conservative)	Maggie Chapman (Green)
7th	2026	Michael Marra (Labour)	Yi-pei Chou Turvey (Lib Dem)	Duncan Massey (Reform)	Mark Simpson (Reform)	James Adams (Conservative)	Liam Kerr (Conservative)	Maggie Chapman (Green)

== Election results ==
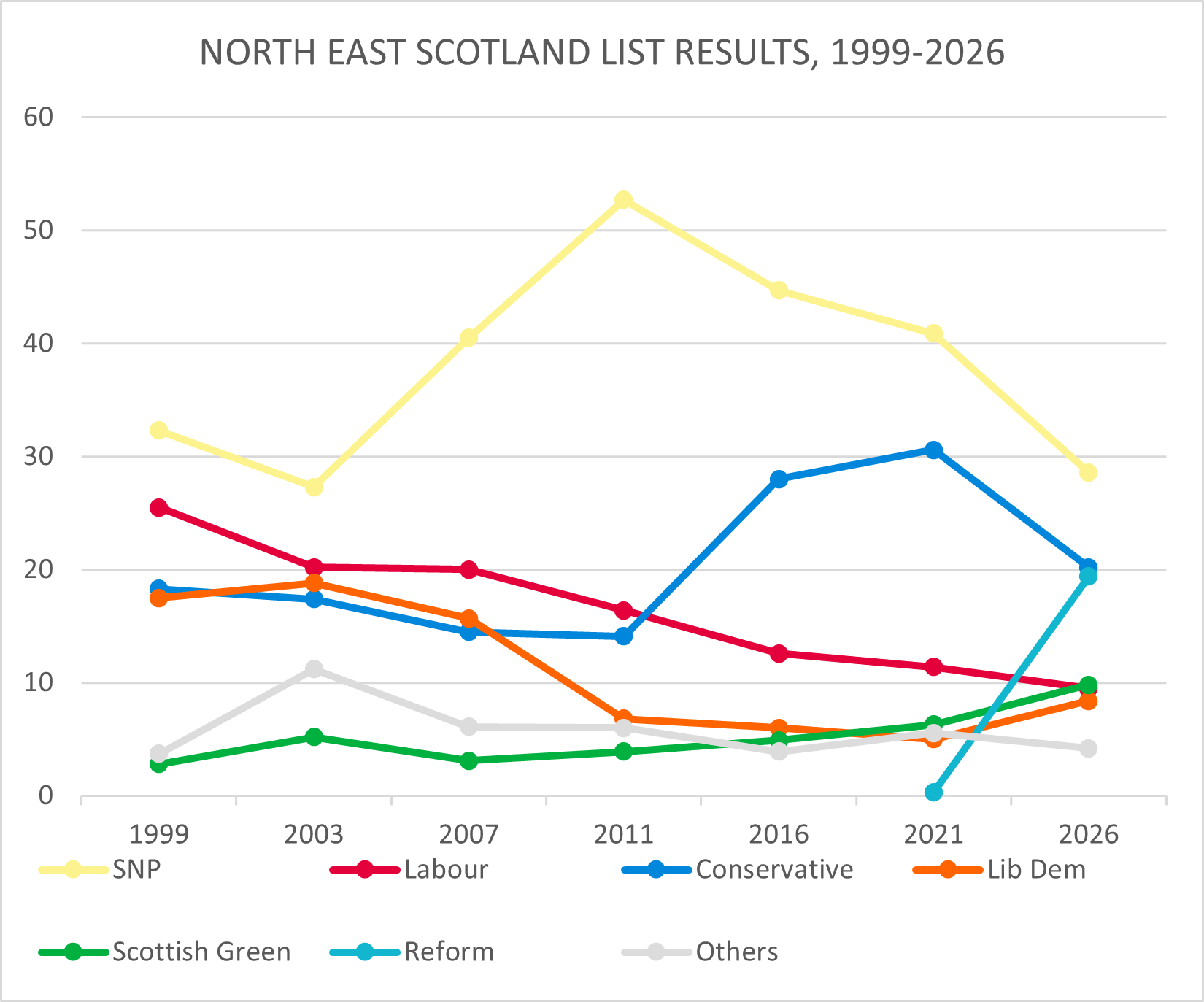
Election results since 1999 (parties who never got >5% counted as others)

=== 2026 Scottish Parliament election ===
==== Constituency results ====
2026 Scottish Parliament election: North East Scotland
Constituency	Elected member	Result
Aberdeen Central	Jack Middleton	SNP **hold**
Aberdeen Deeside and North Kincardine	Stephen Flynn	SNP **hold**
Aberdeen Donside	Jackie Dunbar	SNP **hold**
Aberdeenshire East	Gillian Martin	SNP **hold**
Aberdeenshire West	Alexander Burnett	Conservative **hold**
Angus North and Mearns	Dawn Black	SNP **hold**
Angus South	Lloyd Melville	SNP **hold**
Banffshire and Buchan Coast	Karen Adam	SNP **hold**
Dundee City East	Stephen Gethins	SNP **hold**
Dundee City West	Heather Anderson	SNP **hold**

==== Additional Member results ====
2026 Scottish Parliament election: North East Scotland
List	Candidates	Votes	Of total (%)	± from prev.
SNP	Stephen Flynn, Gillian Martin, Fatima Joji, Christian Allard, Dawn Black, Miranda Radley, Michael Hutchison	88,084	28.6	▼12.3
Conservative	**Liam Kerr**, **Douglas Lumsden**, Alexander Burnett, James Adams, Stewart Whyte, Hannah Powell, Tracey Smith, Jack Cruickshanks, Abi Brooks	62,174	20.2	▼10.4
Reform	**Duncan Massey**, **Mark Simpson**, Claudia Leith, Jo Hart, Conrad Ritchie, John Crawley, Laurie Carnie, Arthur Keith, Bill Reid	59,823	19.4	▲19.1
Green	**Maggie Chapman**, Esme Houston, William Linegar, Sylvia Hardie, Charlotte Horne, Remi Salvan, Fahd Asif, Gordon Miller	30,028	9.8	▲3.5
Labour	**Michael Marra**, Heather Doran, Lynn Thomson, Cheryl-Ann Cruickshank, Simon Watson, Kate Blake, Matthew Lee, Janine Langler, Brooke Ritchie	29,144	9.5	▼1.9
Liberal Democrats	**Yi-pei Chou Turvey**, Michael Turvey, Tanvir Ahmed, Jeff Goodhall, Mel Sullivan, Martyn Knights, David Evans	25,980	8.4	▲3.4
Scottish Family	Euan Morrice, Susan Ettle, Dave Bestwick, Joanna Moore	2,380	0.8	▲0.8
Independent Green Voice	Richard Tallach	2,354	0.8	▲0.8
AtLS	Stephen Bowie, Konrad Rekas, Brett Morrison, Ronald Hardie, Mark Mair	2,270	0.7	▲0.7
ISP	Allan Petrie	1,800	0.6	▲0.6
Independent	Marie Boulton	1,397	0.5	▲0.5
Scottish Socialist	Ross Kenny, Brian Stewart	826	0.3	▲0.3
Workers Party	Peter Ashby, Tariq Imtiaz	750	0.2	▲0.2
Advance UK	Sarah Hashim	465	0.2	▲0.2
Independent	Iris Leask	374	0.1	▲0.1

=== 2021 Scottish Parliament election ===
==== Constituency results ====
2021 Scottish Parliament election: North East Scotland
Constituency	Elected member	Result
Aberdeen Central	Kevin Stewart	SNP **hold**
Aberdeen Donside	Jackie Dunbar	SNP **hold**
Aberdeen South and North Kincardine	Audrey Nicoll	SNP **hold**
Aberdeenshire East	Gillian Martin	SNP **hold**
Aberdeenshire West	Alexander Burnett	Conservative **hold**
Angus North and Mearns	Mairi Gougeon	SNP **hold**
Angus South	Graeme Dey	SNP **hold**
Banffshire and Buchan Coast	Karen Adam	SNP **hold**
Dundee City East	Shona Robison	SNP **hold**
Dundee City West	Joe FitzPatrick	SNP **hold**

==== Additional member results ====
2021 Scottish Parliament election: North East Scotland
List	Candidates	Votes	Of total (%)	± from prev.
SNP	Fatima Joji, Christian Allard, Fergus Mutch, William Duff, Nadia El-Nakla, John Cooke, Lynne Short, Gillian Al-Samarai, Joshua Mennie	147,910	40.9	▼3.8
Conservative	**Liam Kerr**, Alexander Burnett, **Douglas Lumsden**, **Maurice Golden**, **Tess White**, Gillian Tebberen, Stewart White, Mark Findlater, Harriet Cross, Philip Scott, Eleanor Price, Mason McIlreavy, Alan Fakley	110,555	30.6	▲2.6
Labour	**Michael Marra**, **Mercedes Villalba**, Barry Black, Lynn Thomson, Richard McCready, Georgia Strachan, Kaamal Bola, Heather Herbert, Owen Wright	41,062	11.4	▼1.2
Green	**Maggie Chapman**, Guy Ingerson, Rachel Shanks, Leòdhas Iain Massie, Sylvia Hardie, Peter Kennedy, Bradley Booth	22,735	6.3	▲1.4
Liberal Democrats	Rosemary Bruce, John Waddell, Ben Lawrie, Ian Yuill, Conrad Wood, Isobel Davidson, Alison Simpson, Michael Crichton	18,051	5.0	▼1.0
Alba	Alex Salmond, Heather McLean, Brian Topping, Dot Jessiman	8,269	2.3	▲2.3
All for Unity	Scott Fenwick, Arthur Keith, Bobby Ferguson, Danielle Millar, Richard Kelbie, Ben Stones, John McPhee	2,591	0.7	▲0.7
Scottish Family	David Bestwick, John Donaldson, William Strachan, George Arthur, Shehla Arthur	2,311	0.6	▲0.6
Independent Green Voice	Richard Tallach	2,019	0.6	▲0.6
Abolish the Scottish Parliament	Callum Buchanan	1,218	0.3	▲0.3
Reform	John Cox, James Whitelaw, Greig Mair, Samantha Evans, Carol MacDonald	1,056	0.3	▲0.3
Freedom Alliance	Kirsty Miller, Jason Duncan, Diane Mathieson, Sadie Cubitt	1,011	0.3	▲0.3
Restore Scotland	David McHutchon, Ewan Gurr	712	0.2	▲0.2
Scottish Libertarian	Bryce Hope	653	0.2	0.0
UKIP	Duncan Odgers, David Mackay, William Morren, Gerald Haddrell, Albert Emery, Kathleen Rowham	599	0.2	▼1.9
Independent	Laura Marshall	354	0.1	▲0.1
Independent	Geoffrey Alexander Farquharson	156	0.04	0.0
Renew	Colin McFadyen	95	0.0	0.0

=== 2016 Scottish Parliament election ===
In the 2016 Scottish Parliament election the region elected MSPs as follows:

- 9 Scottish National Party MSPs (nine constituency members)
- 5 Conservative MSPs (one constituency member, four additional members)
- 2 Labour MSPs (all additional members)
- 1 Liberal Democrat MSP (additional member)

==== Constituency results ====
2016 Scottish Parliament election: North East Scotland
Constituency	Elected member	Result
Aberdeen Central	Kevin Stewart	SNP **hold**
Aberdeen Donside	Mark McDonald	SNP **hold**
Aberdeen South and North Kincardine	Maureen Watt	SNP **hold**
Aberdeenshire East	Gillian Martin	SNP **hold**
Aberdeenshire West	Alexander Burnett	Conservative **gain** from SNP
Angus North and Mearns	Mairi Evans	SNP **hold**
Angus South	Graeme Dey	SNP **hold**
Banffshire and Buchan Coast	Stewart Stevenson	SNP **hold**
Dundee City East	Shona Robison	SNP **hold**
Dundee City West	Joe Fitzpatrick	SNP **hold**

==== Additional member results ====
Candidates elected on the regional list are shown in bold; candidates elected in a constituency who also stood on a list are shown in italics.

2016 Scottish Parliament election: North East Scotland
List	Candidates	Votes	Of total (%)	± from prev.
SNP	Christian Allard, Fergus Mutch, Vari McDonald, Kevin Stewart, Nigel Don, Nadia El-Nakla, Maureen Watt, Mark McDonald, Bill Duff, Bryan Stuart, Gill Samarai, Donald Morrison	137,086	44.7	−8.1
Conservative	**Alex Johnstone** (died in office), Alexander Burnett, **Ross Thomson**, **Peter Chapman**, **Liam Kerr**, Bill Bowman, Nicola Ross, Colin Clark, Kirstene Hair, Tom Mason	85,848	28.0	+13.9
Labour	**Jenny Marra**, **Lewis MacDonald**, Lesley Brennan, Richard McCready, Sarah Duncan, Willie Young, Alison Evision, Nathan Morrison, Joanne McFadden, John Ruddy	38,791	12.6	−3.8
Liberal Democrats	**Mike Rumbles**, Alison McInnes, Sheila Thomson, Scott Martin Rennie, Craig Robertson Duncan, Euan Robert Davidson, David Ronald Evans	18,444	6.0	−0.8
Green	Maggie Chapman, Dan Yeats, Morag Hannah, David Officer, Anne Mansfield, Morgan Petrie	15,123	4.9	+1.0
UKIP	Calum David Alexander Walker, Emily Ruth Santos, John William Stephen	6,376	2.1	+1.1
Scottish Christian	Tom Morrow, Norman Alexander Ogston	2,068	0.7	−0.1
Solidarity	James Edmund Rodgerson Irving-Lewis, Darren Thomas Ferguson, Brett Matthew Harper, Gareth Desmond Norman, Isobel Alvey	992	0.3	+0.2
National Front	Dave MacDonald	617	0.2	0.0
RISE	Connor Beaton, Marty Smith, Sean Paul O'Connor & Hanne-Lisbeth Paterson	599	0.2	+0.2
Scottish Libertarian	Derek Graham Scott	552	0.2	+0.2
Communist	Raymond Mennie	510	0.2	+0.2

=== 2011 Scottish Parliament election ===
In the 2011 Scottish Parliament election the region elected MSPs as follows:

- 11 Scottish National Party MSPs (ten constituency members and one additional members)
- 3 Labour MSPs (all additional members)
- 2 Conservative MSPs (all additional members)
- 1 Liberal Democrat MSP (additional member)

==== Constituency results ====
2011 Scottish Parliament election: North East Scotland
Constituency	Elected member	Result
Aberdeen Central	Kevin Stewart	SNP **hold**
Aberdeen Donside	Brian Adam	SNP **hold**
Aberdeen South and North Kincardine	Maureen Watt	SNP **gain** from Liberal Democrats
Aberdeenshire East	Alex Salmond	SNP **hold**
Aberdeenshire West	Dennis Robertson	SNP **gain** from Liberal Democrats
Angus North and Mearns	Nigel Don	SNP **hold**
Angus South	Graeme Dey	SNP **hold**
Banffshire and Buchan Coast	Stewart Stevenson	SNP **hold**
Dundee City East	Shona Robison	SNP **hold**
Dundee City West	Joe Fitzpatrick	SNP **hold**

==== Additional member results ====
2011 Scottish Parliament election: North East Scotland
Party	Elected candidates	Seats	+/−	Votes	%	+/−%
SNP	Mark McDonald	1	-1	140,749	52.7	+12.2
Labour	Richard Baker; Jenny Marra; Lewis MacDonald	3	+1	43,893	16.4	-3.2
Conservative	Alex Johnstone; Nanette Milne	2	±0	37,681	14.1	−1.1
Liberal Democrats	Alison McInnes	1	±0	18,178	6.8	−8.4
Green		0	±0	10,407	3.9	+0.7
Scottish Senior Citizens		0	±0	4,420	1.7	+0.1
UKIP		0	±0	2,477	0.9	+0.5
Scottish Christian		0	±0	2,159	0.8	+0.1
BNP		0	±0	1,925	0.7	−0.3
Socialist Labour		0	±0	1,459	0.5	±0
Scottish Socialist		0	±0	1,115	0.4	−0.1
Independent		0	±0	758	0.3	±0
National Front		0	±0	640	0.2	N/A
Angus Independents Representatives		0	±0	471	0.2	N/A
Solidarity		0	±0	286	0.1	−0.7
Independent		0	±0	237	0.1	±0
Independent		0	±0	190	0.1	±0

=== 2007 Scottish Parliament election ===
In the 2007 Scottish Parliament election the region elected MSPs as follows:

- 8 Scottish National Party MSPs (six constituency members and two additional members)
- 3 Labour MSPs (one constituency members and two additional members)
- 3 Liberal Democrat MSPs (two constituency members and one additional member)
- 2 Conservative MSPs (all additional members)

==== Constituency results ====
2007 Scottish Parliament election: North East Scotland
Constituency	Elected member	Result
Aberdeen Central	Lewis Macdonald	Labour **hold**
Aberdeen North	Brian Adam	SNP **hold**
Aberdeen South	Nicol Stephen	Liberal Democrats **hold**
Angus	Andrew Welsh	SNP **hold**
Banff and Buchan	Stewart Stevenson	SNP **hold**
Dundee East	Shona Robison	SNP **hold**
Dundee West	Joe Fitzpatrick	SNP **gain** from Labour
Gordon	Alex Salmond	SNP **gain** from Liberal Democrats
West Aberdeenshire and Kincardine	Mike Rumbles	Liberal Democrats **hold**

==== Additional member results ====
2007 Scottish Parliament election: North East Scotland
Party	Elected candidates	Seats	+/−	Votes	%	+/−%
SNP	Maureen Watt; Nigel Don	2	+1	105,265	40.5	+13.2
Labour	Richard Baker; Marlyn Glen	2	±0	52,125	20.0	-0.1
Conservative	Alex Johnstone; Nanette Milne	2	−1	37,666	14.5	-2.9
Liberal Democrats	Alison McInnes	1	+1	40,934	15.7	−3.1
Green		0	−1	8,148	3.1	−2.1
Scottish Senior Citizens		0	0	3,874	1.5	+1.5
BNP		0	0	2,764	1.1	N/A
Solidarity		0	0	2,004	0.8	N/A
Scottish Christian		0	0	1,895	0.7	N/A
Socialist Labour		0	0	1,331	0.5	−0.5
CPA		0	0	1,113	0.4	N/A
Scottish Socialist		0	0	1,051	0.4	−3.8
UKIP		0	0	1,045	0.4	-0.2
Scottish Voice		0	0	569	0.2	N/A
Scottish Enterprise		0	0	222	0.1	N/A

=== 2003 Scottish Parliament election ===
In the 2003 Scottish Parliament election the region elected MSPs as follows:

- 5 Scottish National Party MSPs (four constituency members and one additional member)
- 4 Labour MSPs (two constituency members and two additional members)
- 3 Liberal Democrat MSPs (all constituency members)
- 3 Conservative MSPs (all additional members)
- 1 Green MSP (additional member)

==== Constituency results ====
2003 Scottish Parliament election: North East Scotland
Constituency	Elected member	Result
Aberdeen Central	Lewis Macdonald	Labour **hold**
Aberdeen North	Brian Adam	SNP **gain** from Labour
Aberdeen South	Nicol Stephen	Liberal Democrats **hold**
Angus	Andrew Welsh	SNP **hold**
Banff and Buchan	Stewart Stevenson	SNP **hold**
Dundee East	Shona Robison	SNP **gain** from Labour
Dundee West	Kate Maclean	Labour **hold**
Gordon	Nora Radcliffe	Liberal Democrats **hold**
West Aberdeenshire and Kincardine	Mike Rumbles	Liberal Democrats **hold**

==== Additional member results ====
2003 Scottish Parliament election: North East Scotland
Party	Elected candidates	Seats	+/−	Votes	%	+/−%
SNP	Richard Lochhead	1	−3	66,463	27.3	-5.0
Labour	Marlyn Glen; Richard Baker	2	+2	49,189	20.2	-5.3
Liberal Democrats		0	0	45,831	18.8	+1.3
Conservative	David Davidson; Nanette Milne; Alex Johnstone	3	±0	42,318	17.4	-0.9
Green	Shiona Baird	1	+1	12,724	5.2	+2.4
Scottish Socialist		0	0	10,226	4.2	+3.1
Scottish Pensioners		0	0	5,584	2.3	N/A
Fishing		0	0	5,566	2.3	N/A
Socialist Labour		0	0	2,431	1.0	-0.2
UKIP		0	0	1,498	0.6	N/A
Scottish People's		0	0	941	0.4	N/A
Independent		0	0	902	0.4	N/A

Changes:

- Maureen Watt replaced Richard Lochhead, who resigned as an MSP in April 2006 to contest the Moray by-election following the death of Margaret Ewing. Watt was the next available candidate on the SNP list.

=== 1999 Scottish Parliament election ===
In the 1999 Scottish Parliament election the region elected MSPs as follows:

- 6 Scottish National Party MSPs (two constituency members four additional members)
- 4 Labour MSPs (all constituency members)
- 3 Liberal Democrat MSPs (all constituency members)
- 3 Conservative MSPs (all additional members)

==== Constituency results ====
1999 Scottish Parliament election: North East Scotland
Constituency	Elected member	Result
Aberdeen Central	Lewis Macdonald	Scottish Labour **win** (new seat)
Aberdeen North	Elaine Thomson	Scottish Labour **win** (new seat)
Aberdeen South	Nicol Stephen	Scottish Liberal Democrats **win** (new seat)
Angus	Andrew Welsh	Scottish National Party **win** (new seat)
Banff and Buchan	Alex Salmond	Scottish National Party **win** (new seat)
Dundee East	John McAllion	Scottish Labour **win** (new seat)
Dundee West	Kate Maclean	Scottish Labour **win** (new seat)
Gordon	Nora Radcliffe	Scottish Liberal Democrats **win** (new seat)
West Aberdeenshire and Kincardine	Mike Rumbles	Scottish Liberal Democrats **win** (new seat)

Changes:

- 2001 Banff and Buchan by-election: Stewart Stevenson replaced Alex Salmond, who had resigned. Salmond was elected as the Member of Parliament for the Banff and Buchan constituency of the United Kingdom Parliament the same day as the Scottish Parliament by-election.

==== Additional member results ====
1999 Scottish Parliament election: North East Scotland
Party	Elected candidates	Seats	+/−	Votes	%	+/−%
SNP	Brian Adam; Richard Lochhead; Shona Robison; Irene McGugan	4	N/A	93,329	32.3	N/A
Labour		0	N/A	72,666	25.5	N/A
Conservative	David Davidson; Ben Wallace; Alex Johnstone	3	N/A	52,149	18.3	N/A
Liberal Democrats		0	N/A	49,843	17.5	N/A
Green		0	N/A	8,067	2.8	N/A
Socialist Labour		0	N/A	3,557	1.2	N/A
Scottish Socialist		0	N/A	3,016	1.1	N/A
Independent		0	N/A	2,303	0.8	N/A
Independent		0	N/A	770	0.3	N/A
Natural Law		0	N/A	746	0.3	N/A
