= Irene McGugan =

Scottish politician (born 1952)

Member of the Scottish Parliament for North East Scotland (1 of 7 Regional MSPs)
- In office 6 May 1999 – 31 March 2003

Personal details
- Born: 1952 (age 73–74) Angus, Scotland
- Party: Scottish National Party

Irene McGugan (born 1952) is a Scottish politician. She was a Scottish National Party (SNP) Member of the Scottish Parliament (MSP) for North East Scotland region from 1999 to 2003.

In the 1999 election she stood as a constituency candidate in Aberdeen South, finishing fourth. However her number four position on the SNP North East Scotland list was enough to take her to Holyrood. She was the SNP's deputy party spokesperson on Education and Young People from June 2001, replacing John Swinney who became party leader.

She contested the seat of Dundee West in the 2003 election, where she narrowly lost to the Labour incumbent Kate Maclean.
