= Mercedes Villalba =

Scottish Labour politician (born 1989)

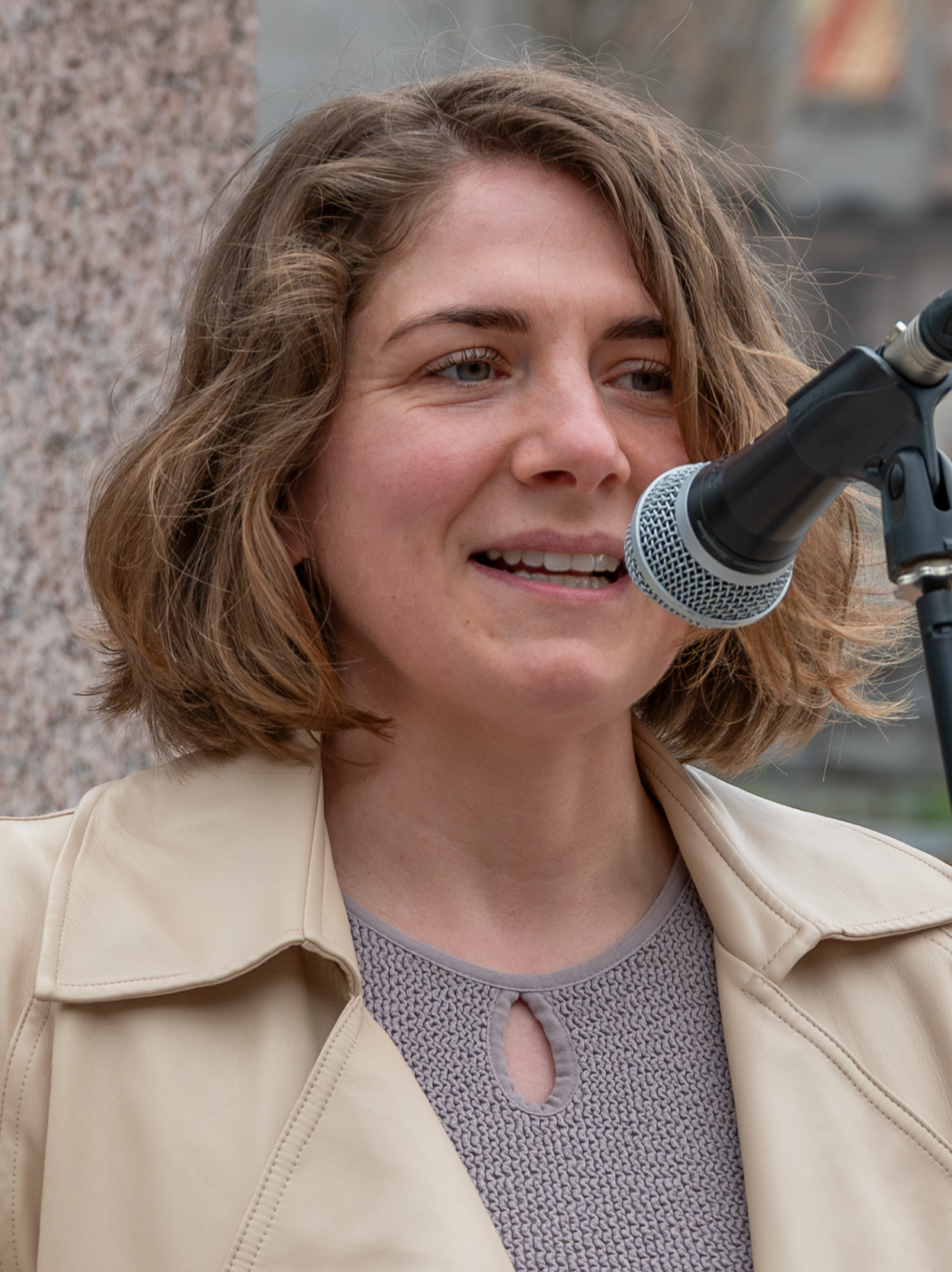
- Villalba in 2026

Member of the Scottish Parliament for North East Scotland (1 of 7 Regional MSPs)
- In office 6 May 2021 – 9 April 2026

Shadow Minister for Environment and Biodiversity
- In office 1 June 2021 – 8 April 2026

Personal details
- Born: 1989 (age 36–37) Bristol, England
- Party: Scottish Labour
- Mercedes Villalba's voice Villalba giving a speech at a May Day march in Aberdeen; Recorded May 2026

Mercedes Beatrice M. Villalba (born 1989) is a Scottish Labour politician who served as a Member of the Scottish Parliament (MSP) for North East Scotland from 2021 to 2026.

== Background ==
Villalba was born in 1989, and is originally from Bristol, England. She settled in Dundee and was a shop steward with the Universities and Colleges Union (UCU).

== Political career ==
On 7 May 2021 she was unsuccessful as Labour's candidate for Dundee City West, but the following day was elected as a Member of the Scottish Parliament (MSP) through the North East Scotland list. She was appointed as Shadow Minister for Environment and Biodiversity in June 2021.

In 2022, she called for the Labour whip to be restored to Jeremy Corbyn after having it suspended for failing to retract his remarks in response to a report by the Equality and Human Rights Commission into anti-Semitism in the Labour Party, as demanded by Keir Starmer and David Evans.

On 2 September 2025, she announced she would stand down at the 2026 Scottish Parliament election.

== Political beliefs ==
She is an outspoken critic of the British royal family, and has called for its abolition. She has also criticised the Rosebank oil and gas field for its projected contributions to climate change, and Delek Group – the parent company of one of its operators, Ithaca Energy – for its activity in Israeli settlements.

On 6 July 2021, Villalba submitted a motion to demand an end to the United States embargo against Cuba.
