= West Aberdeenshire and Kincardine (Scottish Parliament constituency) =

Region or constituency of the Scottish Parliament

- Former county constituency for the Scottish Parliament
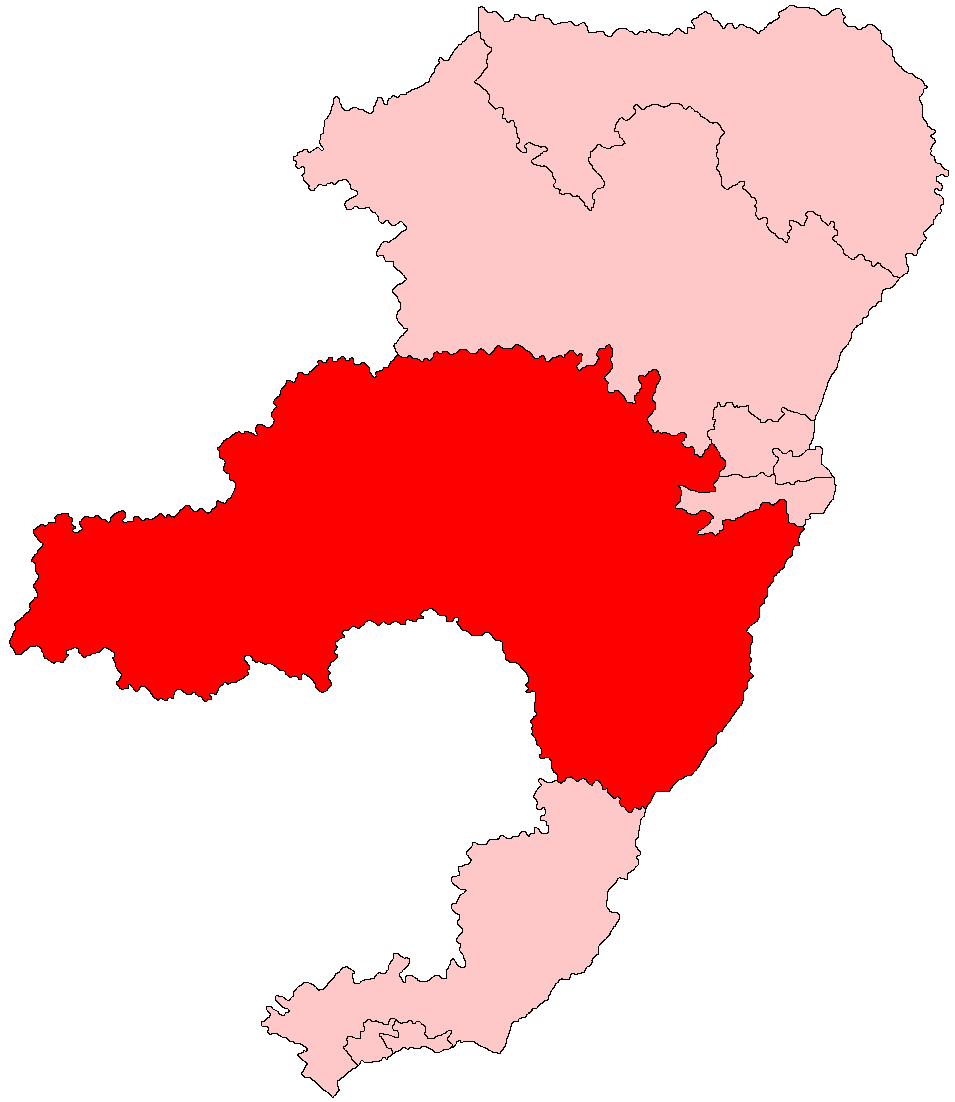

- West Aberdeenshire and Kincardine shown within the North East Scotland electoral region and the region shown within Scotland

Former constituency
- Created: 1999
- Abolished: 2011
- Council area: Aberdeenshire (part)
- Replaced by: Aberdeenshire West, Aberdeen South and North Kincardine, Angus North and Mearns

West Aberdeenshire and Kincardine was a constituency of the Scottish Parliament (Holyrood). It elected one Member of the Scottish Parliament (MSP) by the first past the post method of election. Also, however, it was one of nine constituencies in the North East Scotland electoral region, which elected seven additional members, in addition to nine constituency MSPs, to produce a form of proportional representation for the region as a whole.

For the Scottish Parliament election, 2011, West Aberdeenshire and Kincardine was abolished, replaced in part by Aberdeen South and North Kincardine, Aberdeenshire East, and Aberdeenshire West.

== Electoral region ==
The other eight constituencies of the North East Scotland region were: Aberdeen Central, Aberdeen North, Aberdeen South, Angus, Banff and Buchan, Dundee East, Dundee West and Gordon.

The region covered the Aberdeenshire council area, the Aberdeen City council area, the Dundee City council area, part of the Angus council area, a small part of the Moray council area and a small part of the Perth and Kinross council area.

== Constituency boundaries ==
The West Aberdeenshire and Kincardine constituency was created at the same time as the Scottish Parliament, in 1999, with the name and boundaries of an existing Westminster constituency. In 2005, however, the boundaries of the Westminster (House of Commons) constituency were subject to some alteration.

=== Council area ===
The Holyrood constituency covered a southern portion of the Aberdeenshire council area. The rest of the Aberdeenshire area was covered by two other constituencies, both also in the North East Scotland electoral region: Gordon was to the north of the West Aberdeenshire and Kincardine constituency, and Banff and Buchan was further north. Gordon also covered a small eastern portion of the Moray council area.

== Member of the Scottish Parliament ==
| Election | Member | Party |
|---|---|---|
| 1999 | Mike Rumbles | Scottish Liberal Democrats |
| 2003 | Mike Rumbles | Scottish Liberal Democrats |
| 2007 | Mike Rumbles | Scottish Liberal Democrats |

== Election results ==
2007 Scottish Parliament election: West Aberdeenshire and Kincardine
| Notes: | Blue background denotes the winner of the electorate vote. Pink background denotes a candidate elected from their party list. Yellow background denotes an electorate win by a list member, or other incumbent. A ✓ or ✗ denotes status of any incumbent, win or lose respectively. | | | | | | |
| Party | Candidate | Votes | % | ±% | Party votes | % | ±% |
|---|---|---|---|---|---|---|---|
| Liberal Democrats | ✓ Mike Rumbles | 14,314 | 41.1 | -4.9 | 8,765 | 24.91 | -6.88 |
| SNP | Dennis Robertson | 9,144 | 26.3 | +12.1 | 11,261 | 32.00 | +16.67 |
| Conservative | Stewart Whyte | 8,604 | 24.7 | -4.2 | 7,990 | 22.71 | -4.78 |
| Labour | James Nobel | 2,761 | 7.9 | -0.7 | 3,862 | 10.98 | +0.72 |
| Green | | | | | 1,472 | 4.18 | -2.39 |
| Scottish Senior Citizens | | | | | 461 | 1.31 | -0.26 |
| BNP | | | | | 318 | 0.90 | +0.90 |
| Scottish Christian | | | | | 242 | 0.69 | +0.69 |
| Solidarity | | | | | 186 | 0.53 | +0.53 |
| UKIP | | | | | 175 | 0.50 | -0.21 |
| CPA | | | | | 149 | 0.42 | +0.42 |
| Scottish Socialist | | | | | 96 | 0.27 | -2.62 |
| Socialist Labour | | | | | 88 | 0.25 | -0.46 |
| Scottish Voice | | | | | 84 | 0.24 | +0.24 |
| Scottish Enterprise | | | | | 39 | 0.11 | +0.11 |
| Informal votes | | 984 | | | 619 | | |
| Total valid votes | | 34,823 | | | 35,188 | | |
| Turnout | | 35,807 | 54.9 | | | | |
| Liberal Democrats hold | Majority | 5,170 | 14.8 | -2.3 | | | |

2003 Scottish Parliament election: West Aberdeenshire and Kincardine
| Notes: | Blue background denotes the winner of the electorate vote. Pink background denotes a candidate elected from their party list. Yellow background denotes an electorate win by a list member, or other incumbent. A ✓ or ✗ denotes status of any incumbent, win or lose respectively. | | | | | | |
| Party | Candidate | Votes | % | ±% | Party votes | % | ±% |
|---|---|---|---|---|---|---|---|
| Liberal Democrats | ✓ Mike Rumbles | 14,553 | 46.00 | +10.08 | 10,047 | 31.79 | +6.36 |
| Conservative | David Davidson | 9,154 | 28.94 | -0.58 | 8,688 | 27.49 | -0.97 |
| SNP | Ian Angus | 4,489 | 14.19 | -7.35 | 4,846 | 15.33 | -8.80 |
| Labour | Kevin Hutchens | 2,727 | 8.62 | -4.39 | 3,244 | 10.26 | -5.85 |
| Scottish Socialist | Alan Manley | 713 | 2.25 | +2.25 | 913 | 2.89 | +2.50 |
| Green | | | | | 2,077 | 6.57 | +3.38 |
| Fishing Party | | | | | 703 | 2.22 | +2.22 |
| Scottish Pensioners | | | | | 496 | 1.57 | +1.57 |
| UKIP | | | | | 224 | 0.71 | +0.71 |
| Socialist Labour | | | | | 186 | 0.59 | -0.12 |
| Independent - David Mathers | | | | | 108 | 0.34 | +0.34 |
| Scottish People's | | | | | 71 | 0.22 | +0.22 |
| Informal votes | | 147 | | | 165 | | |
| Total valid votes | | 31,636 | | | 31,603 | | |
| Turnout | | 31,636 | | | | | |
| Liberal Democrats hold | Majority | 5,399 | 17.06 | +10.66 | | | |

1999 Scottish Parliament election: West Aberdeenshire and Kincardine
| Notes: | Blue background denotes the winner of the electorate vote. Pink background denotes a candidate elected from their party list. Yellow background denotes an electorate win by a list member, or other incumbent. A ✓ or ✗ denotes status of any incumbent, win or lose respectively. | | | | | | |
| Party | Candidate | Votes | % | ±% | Party votes | % | ±% |
|---|---|---|---|---|---|---|---|
| Liberal Democrats | Mike Rumbles | 12,838 | 35.92 | | 9,091 | 25.43 | |
| Conservative | Ben Wallace | 10,549 | 29.52 | | 10,166 | 28.43 | |
| SNP | Maureen Watt | 7,699 | 21.54 | | 8,626 | 24.13 | |
| Labour | Gordon Guthrie | 4,650 | 13.01 | | 5,760 | 16.11 | |
| Green | | | | | 1,140 | 3.19 | |
| Independent - Hamish Watt | | | | | 319 | 0.89 | |
| Socialist Labour | | | | | 268 | 0.75 | |
| Scottish Socialist | | | | | 140 | 0.39 | |
| Independent - William McColl Robb | | | | | 138 | 0.39 | |
| Natural Law | | | | | 103 | 0.29 | |
| Informal votes | | 88 | | | 77 | | |
| Total valid votes | | 38,025 | | | 35,751 | | |
| Turnout | | 35,736 | | | | | |
| Liberal Democrats win new seat | Majority | 2,289 | 6.40 | | | | |

== See also ==
- West Aberdeenshire and Kincardine (UK Parliament constituency)
