= Keith Grammar School =

Secondary school in Keith, Moray, Scotland

Coordinates: 57°32′42″N 2°56′42″W

- Keith

Information
- Type: Secondary School
- Motto: Do Ut Des
- Established: 1965
- Head teacher: Sean Duffy
- Website: https://www.keithgrammarschool.co.uk/

Keith Grammar School is a secondary school in, Moray, Scotland.

== History ==
It was built in 1965 by the Educational Committee of Banffshire County Council. As of September 2013 the school roll was 450 pupils.

== Administration ==
It is administered by the Moray Council Education and Social Care Department.

== Notable former pupils ==
- Brian Adam (1948–2013), politician and biochemist.
- James Naughtie, BBC presenter and journalist.
- Hamish Watt (1925–2014), politician and farmer.
- Maureen Watt (born 1951), SNP politician.
