= Dundee City West =

Region or constituency of the Scottish Parliament

- Burgh constituency for the Scottish Parliament
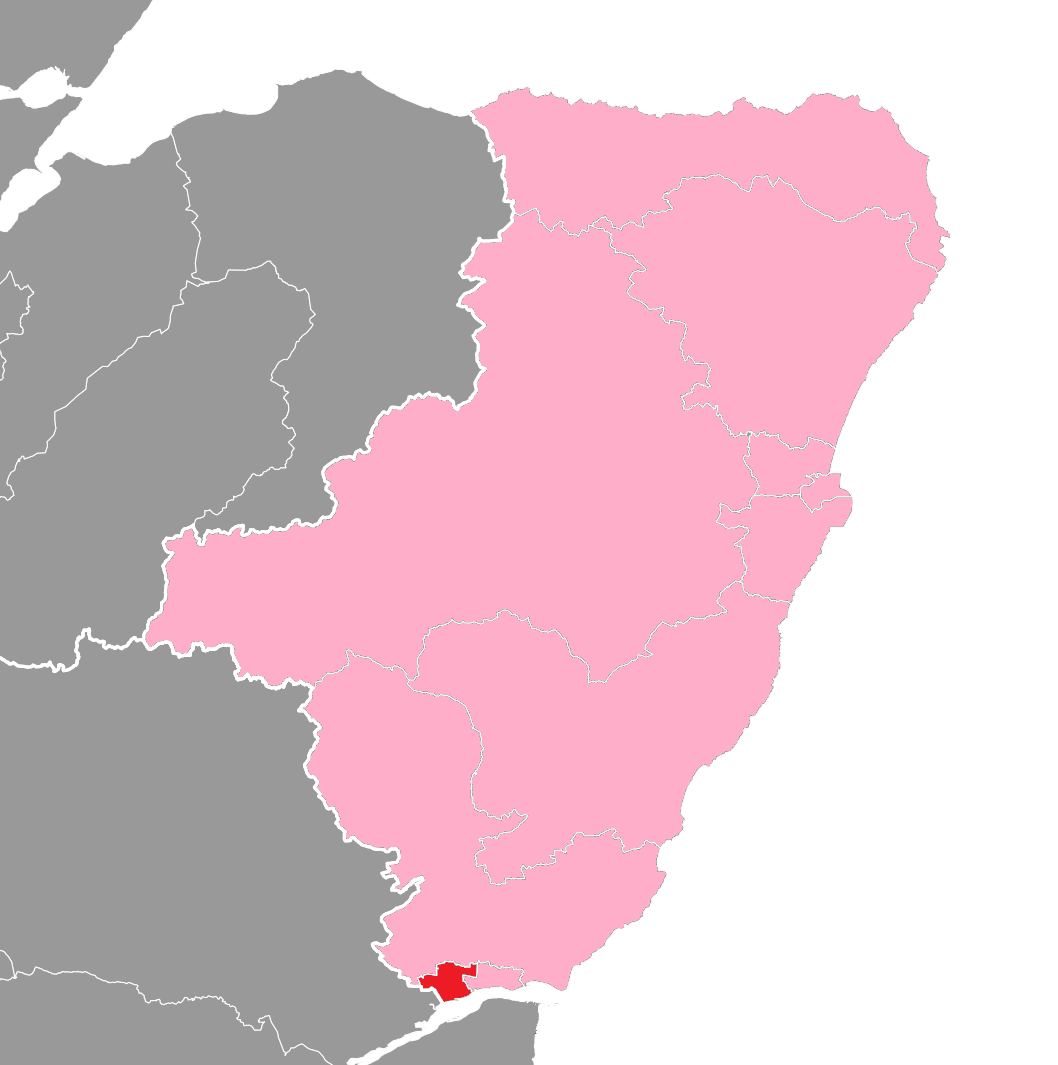

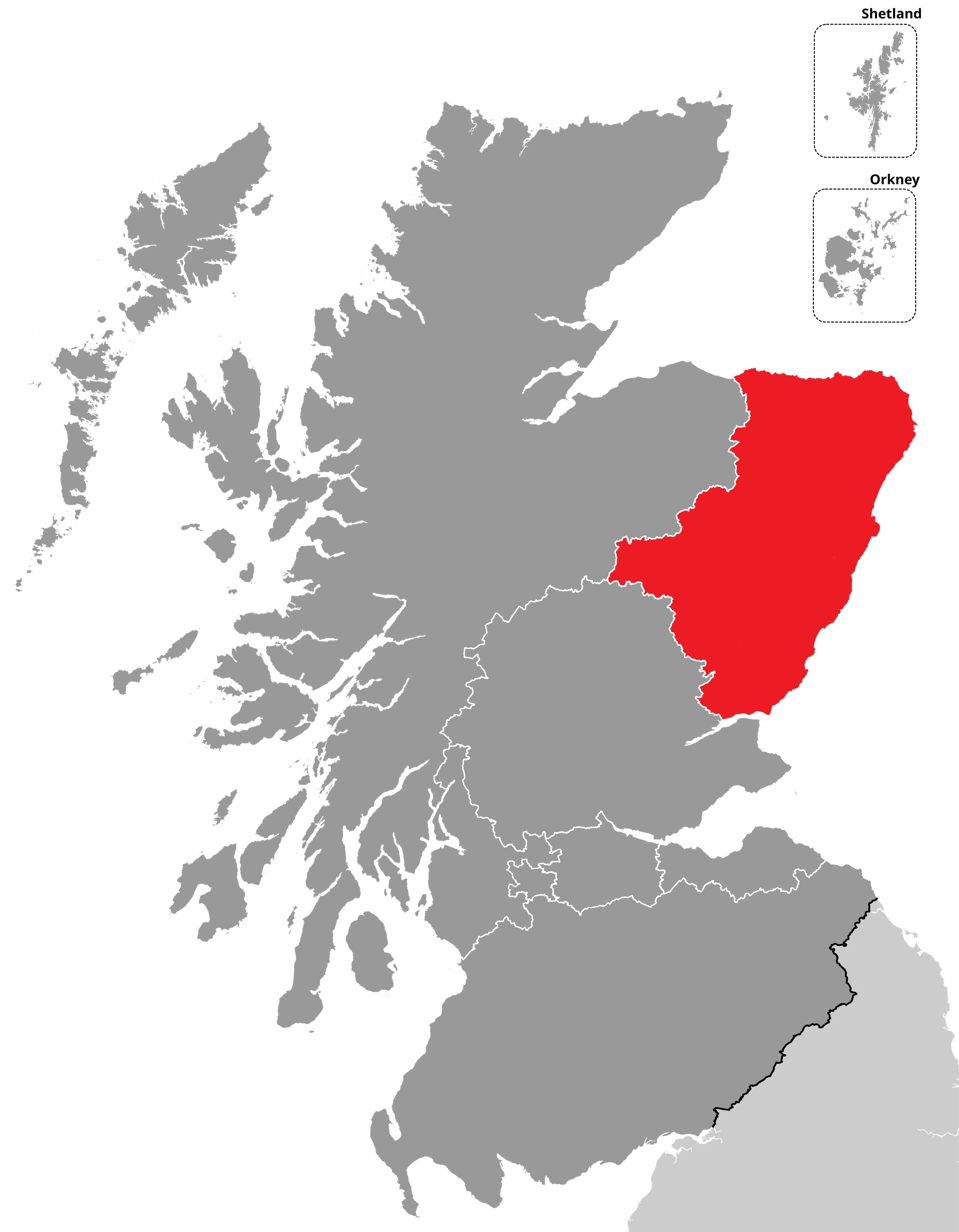
- Dundee City West shown within the North East Scotland electoral region and the region shown within Scotland
- Electoral region: North East Scotland
- Electorate: 56,096 (2026)

Current constituency
- Created: 2011
- Party: Scottish National Party
- MSP: Heather Anderson
- Council area: Dundee City
- Created from: Dundee West

Dundee City West (Gaelic: Baile Dhùn Dè an Iar) is a burgh constituency of the Scottish Parliament covering part of the Dundee City council area. It elects one Member of the Scottish Parliament (MSP) by the first past the post method of election. Under the additional-member electoral system used for elections to the Scottish Parliament, it is also one of ten constituencies in the North East Scotland electoral region, which elects seven additional members, in addition to the ten constituency MSPs, to produce a form of proportional representation for the region as a whole.

The constituency was created for the 2011 Scottish Parliament election, and largely replaced the previous seat of Dundee West. It had been held by Joe FitzPatrick from its creation until he stepped down in 2026. He was replaced by Heather Anderson at the 2026 Scottish Parliament election.

== Electoral region ==
The other nine constituencies of the North East Scotland region are: Aberdeen Central, Aberdeen Donside, Aberdeen South and North Kincardine, Aberdeenshire East, Aberdeenshire West, Angus North and Mearns, Angus South, Banffshire and Buchan Coast and Dundee City East. The region covers all of the Aberdeen City council area, the Aberdeenshire council area, the Angus council area, the Dundee City council area and part of the Moray council area.

== Constituency boundaries and council area ==
Map of boundaries from 2011

The Dundee City council area is represented by two constituencies in the Scottish Parliament: Dundee City East and Dundee City West.

A Dundee West constituency was created at the same time as the Scottish Parliament, for the 1999 Scottish Parliament election, using the name and boundaries of the existing Dundee West constituency of the UK Parliament. Ahead of the 2005 United Kingdom general election the boundaries used for elections to the UK Parliament were subject to some alteration, whilst being retained for elections to the Scottish Parliament. There is now no longer any link between the two sets of constituencies. New Scottish Parliament boundaries were introduced for the 2011 Scottish Parliament election, with Dundee West being renamed Dundee City West, with borders redrawn slightly to include the 'Hebrides' neighbourhood at Claverhouse just west of the A90 road, and the edge-of-town housing developments at Dykes of Gray and the former Liff Hospital. The seat was unaffected by the second periodic review of Scottish Parliament boundaries, remaining unchanged for the 2026 Scottish Parliament election. The constituency comprises the following electoral wards of Dundee City Council:

- In full: Strathmartine, Lochee, West End
- In part: Coldside, Maryfield, North East (shared with Dundee City East)

== Member of the Scottish Parliament ==
| Election | Member | Party |
|---|---|---|
| 2011 | Joe FitzPatrick | SNP |
| 2026 | Heather Anderson | SNP |

== Election results ==
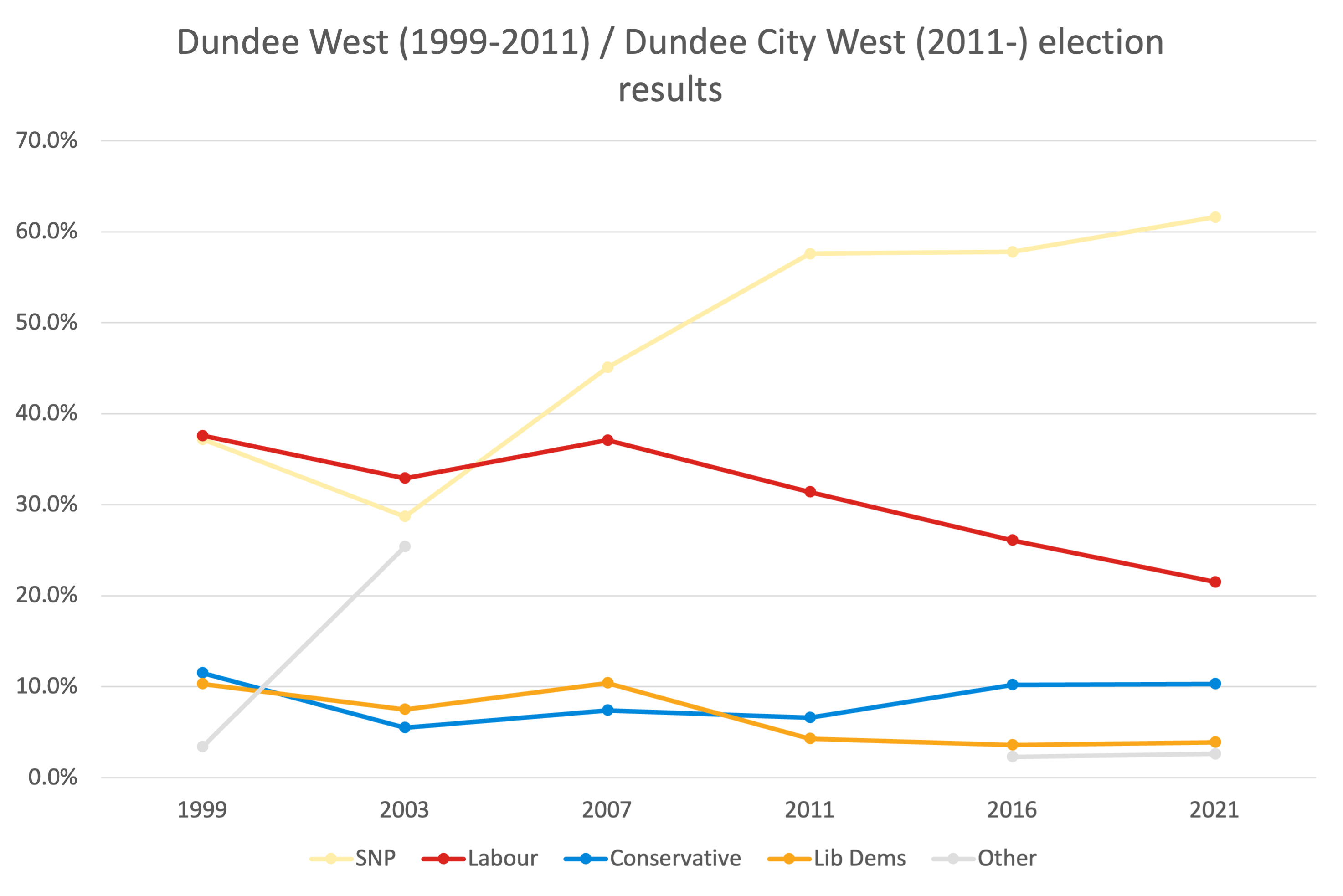
Dundee City West election results 1999-2021

=== 2020s ===
2026 Scottish Parliament election: Dundee City West
| Party | Candidate | Constituency | | | Regional | | |
| Party | Candidate | Votes | % | ±% | Votes | % | ±% |
|---|---|---|---|---|---|---|---|
| SNP | Heather Anderson | 12,722 | 49.1 | ▼12.1 | 8,777 | 33.8 | ▼18.1 |
| Labour | Michael Marra (Note: Incumbent member on the party list, or for another constituency) | 6,365 | 24.6 | ▲3.1 | 5,067 | 19.5 | ▲1.5 |
| Green | | | | | 4,710 | 18.1 | ▲9.2 |
| Reform | Arthur Keith | 3,315 | 12.8 | New | 3,414 | 13.1 | ▲12.8 |
| Liberal Democrats | Daniel Coleman | 1,980 | 7.6 | ▲3.7 | 1,533 | 5.9 | ▲3.1 |
| Conservative | Abi Brooks | 881 | 3.4 | ▼6.9 | 1,157 | 4.5 | ▼7.3 |
| TUSC | Jim McFarlane | 649 | 2.5 | New | | | |
| Independent Green Voice | | | | | 328 | 1.3 | ▲0.6 |
| AtLS | | | | | 308 | 1.2 | New |
| ISP | | | | | 206 | 0.8 | New |
| Scottish Socialist | | | | | 146 | 0.6 | New |
| Scottish Family | | | | | 142 | 0.5 | ▼0.1 |
| Workers Party | | | | | 102 | 0.4 | New |
| Advance UK | | | | | 49 | 0.2 | New |
| Independent | Marie Boulton | | | | 43 | 0.2 | New |
| Independent | Iris Leask | | | | 14 | 0.1 | New |
| Majority | | 6,357 | 24.5 | ▼15.6 | | | |
| Valid votes | | 25,912 | | | 25,996 | | |
| Invalid votes | | 110 | | | 74 | | |
| Turnout | | 26,022 | 46.4 | ▼10.5 | 26,070 | 46.5 | ▼10.4 |
| SNP hold | | Swing | | | | | |
Notes

2021 Scottish Parliament election: Dundee City West
| Party | Candidate | Constituency | | | Regional | | |
| Party | Candidate | Votes | % | ±% | Votes | % | ±% |
|---|---|---|---|---|---|---|---|
| SNP | Joe FitzPatrick (Note: Incumbent member for this constituency) | 19,818 | 61.6 | ▲3.8 | 16,730 | 51.9 | ▼2.3 |
| Labour | Mercedes Villalba (Note: Elected on the party list) | 6,899 | 21.5 | ▼4.6 | 5,791 | 18.0 | ▼3.8 |
| Conservative | Tess White | 3,327 | 10.3 | ▲0.1 | 3,801 | 11.8 | ▲0.2 |
| Green | | | | | 2,862 | 8.9 | ▲2.8 |
| Liberal Democrats | Daniel Coleman | 1,269 | 3.9 | ▲0.3 | 903 | 2.8 | ▲0.3 |
| Alba | | | | | 859 | 2.7 | New |
| TUSC | Jim McFarlane | 432 | 1.3 | ▼1.0 | | | |
| All for Unity | | | | | 259 | 0.8 | New |
| Independent Green Voice | | | | | 225 | 0.7 | New |
| Scottish Family | | | | | 206 | 0.6 | New |
| Restore Scotland | Ewan Gurr | 410 | 1.3 | New | 124 | 0.4 | New |
| Reform | | | | | 83 | 0.3 | New |
| Abolish the Scottish Parliament | | | | | 78 | 0.2 | New |
| Scottish Libertarian | | | | | 61 | 0.2 | ▲0.1 |
| Freedom Alliance (UK) | | | | | 60 | 0.2 | New |
| UKIP | | | | | 44 | 0.1 | ▼1.5 |
| Independent | Laura Marshall | | | | 20 | 0.1 | New |
| Renew | | | | | 19 | 0.1 | New |
| Independent | Geoffrey Farquharson | | | | 12 | 0.0 | New |
| Majority | | 12,919 | 40.1 | ▲8.3 | | | |
| Valid votes | | 32,155 | | | 32,137 | | |
| Invalid votes | | 126 | | | 121 | | |
| Turnout | | 32,281 | 56.9 | ▲5.1 | 32,258 | 56.9 | ▲5.1 |
| SNP hold | | Swing | | | | | |

=== 2010s ===
2016 Scottish Parliament election: Dundee City West
| Party | Candidate | Constituency | | | Regional | | |
| Party | Candidate | Votes | % | ±% | Votes | % | ±% |
|---|---|---|---|---|---|---|---|
| SNP | Joe FitzPatrick (Note: Incumbent member for this constituency) | 16,070 | 57.8 | ▲0.2 | 15,092 | 54.2 | ▲1.2 |
| Labour | Jenny Marra | 7,242 | 26.1 | ▼5.3 | 6,055 | 21.8 | ▼5.6 |
| Conservative | Nicola Ross | 2,826 | 10.2 | ▲3.6 | 3,232 | 11.6 | ▲5.2 |
| Green | | | | | 1,704 | 6.1 | ▲2.6 |
| Liberal Democrats | Daniel Coleman | 1,008 | 3.6 | ▼0.7 | 707 | 2.5 | ▼0.5 |
| TUSC | Jim McFarlane | 642 | 2.3 | New | | | |
| UKIP | | | | | 445 | 1.6 | ▲1.1 |
| Solidarity | | | | | 198 | 0.7 | ▲0.3 |
| Scottish Christian | | | | | 137 | 0.5 | ▼0.3 |
| RISE | | | | | 122 | 0.4 | New |
| Communist | | | | | 64 | 0.2 | New |
| National Front | | | | | 48 | 0.2 | ▼0.1 |
| Scottish Libertarian | | | | | 35 | 0.1 | New |
| Majority | | 8,828 | 31.7 | ▲5.5 | | | |
| Valid votes | | 27,788 | | | 27,839 | | |
| Invalid votes | | 115 | | | 65 | | |
| Turnout | | 27,903 | 51.8 | ▲6.1 | 27,904 | 51.8 | ▲5.9 |
| SNP hold | | Swing | | ▲2.8 | | | |
Notes

2011 Scottish Parliament election: Dundee City West
| Party | Candidate | Constituency | | | Region | | |
| Party | Candidate | Votes | % | ±% | Votes | % | ±% |
|---|---|---|---|---|---|---|---|
| SNP | Joe FitzPatrick (Note: Incumbent member on the party list, or for another constituency) | 14,089 | 57.6 | N/A | 13,052 | 53.0 | N/A |
| Labour | Richard McCready | 7,684 | 31.4 | N/A | 6,734 | 27.4 | N/A |
| Conservative | Colin Stewart | 1,625 | 6.6 | N/A | 1,586 | 6.4 | N/A |
| Green | | | | | 867 | 3.5 | N/A |
| Liberal Democrats | Allison Burns | 1,063 | 4.3 | N/A | 749 | 3.0 | N/A |
| All-Scotland Pensioners Party | | | | | 444 | 1.8 | N/A |
| Socialist Labour | | | | | 232 | 0.9 | N/A |
| Scottish Christian | | | | | 199 | 0.8 | N/A |
| BNP | | | | | 188 | 0.8 | N/A |
| Scottish Socialist | | | | | 156 | 0.6 | N/A |
| UKIP | | | | | 129 | 0.5 | N/A |
| Solidarity | | | | | 92 | 0.4 | N/A |
| National Front | | | | | 72 | 0.3 | N/A |
| Angus Independents | | | | | 13 | 0.1 | N/A |
| Others | | | | | 78 | 0.3 | N/A |
| Majority | | 6,405 | 26.2 | N/A | | | |
| Valid votes | | 24,461 | | | 24,591 | | |
| Invalid votes | | 144 | | | 121 | | |
| Turnout | | 24,605 | 45.7 | N/A | 24,712 | 45.9 | N/A |
| SNP win (new seat) | | | | | | | |

== See also ==
- Politics of Dundee

== See also ==
- Dundee West (UK Parliament constituency)
- Dundee West (Scottish Parliament constituency)
