= Maureen Watt =

Scottish politician (born 1951)

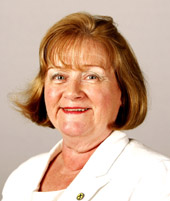

Minister for Mental Health
- In office 18 May 2016 – 27 June 2018
- First Minister: Nicola Sturgeon
- Preceded by: Jamie Hepburn (as Minister for Sport, Health Improvement and Mental Health)
- Succeeded by: Clare Haughey

Minister for Public Health
- In office 21 November 2014 – 18 May 2016
- First Minister: Nicola Sturgeon
- Preceded by: Michael Matheson
- Succeeded by: Aileen Campbell

Convener of the Scottish Parliament Infrastructure and Capital Investment Committee
- In office 15 June 2011 – 25 November 2014
- Preceded by: Patrick Harvie (as Convenor of the Transport, Infrastructure and Climate Change Committee)
- Succeeded by: Jim Eadie

Minister for Schools and Skills
- In office 17 May 2007 – 10 February 2009
- First Minister: Alex Salmond
- Preceded by: Hugh Henry
- Succeeded by: Keith Brown

Member of the Scottish Parliament for Aberdeen South and North Kincardine
- In office 5 May 2011 – 5 May 2021
- Preceded by: Nicol Stephen
- Succeeded by: Audrey Nicoll

Member of the Scottish Parliament for North East Scotland (1 of 7 Regional MSPs)
- In office 19 April 2006 – 22 March 2011

Personal details
- Born: 23 June 1951 (age 75) Aberdeen, Scotland
- Party: Scottish National Party
- Children: Stuart Donaldson
- Parent: Hamish Watt (father)
- Education: Keith Grammar School, University of Strathclyde

Maureen Elizabeth Watt (born 23 June 1951) is a Scottish National Party (SNP) politician and former Minister for Mental Health in the Scottish Government. She was the Member of the Scottish Parliament (MSP) representing the constituency of Aberdeen South and North Kincardine from 2011 to 2021 when she retired, having previously served as a regional member for North East Scotland from 2006 until 2011.

== Early life ==
Born in Aberdeen to a farming family, she was educated at Keith Grammar School and studied at University of Strathclyde, graduating with an Honours degree in Politics. She went on to gain a Postgraduate Certificate in Education from the University of Birmingham.

== Early career ==
She was a teacher in Social Studies at a Comprehensive school in England from 1974–1976 and moved back to Scotland to work in the oil sector. In the mid-1990s she worked as Rector’s Assessor for Allan Macartney when he was Rector of the University of Aberdeen. In 1998 she was appointed to the Independent Commission on Local Government and the Scottish Parliament.

She was a Councillor on Grampian Regional Council and had served on the Visiting Committee of Aberdeen Prison.

== Parliamentary career ==
Watt stood a candidate in the 2003 Scottish Parliament election but was not elected. Before the term ended, Richard Lochhead resigned his seat to contest the Moray by-election. The next person on the SNP list from the 2003 election had been Alasdair Allan but he refused his place in Parliament as he had secured the SNP nomination for the Western Isles for the 2007 election. The next person on the list was Maureen Watt, who took up the place.

Watt was sworn in as MSP on 19 April 2006, becoming the first MSP to swear their oath of allegiance in Doric.

Watt made her maiden speech on 20 April 2006 on the subject of Drug Treatment and Rehabilitation. With a gap of only 17 hours 25 minutes since taking the Parliamentary oath she took over the record for the shortest wait from John Scott.

After the SNP's victory at the 2007 Scottish Parliament Election, Watt was appointed as the Minister for Schools and Skills. She left this office on 10 February 2009.

In May 2011, Watt was elected as SNP MSP for Aberdeen South and North Kincardine on a 15.77% swing from the Liberal Democrats.

She was Convener of the Scottish Parliament Infrastructure and Capital Investment Committee from 15 June 2011. On 21 November 2014 she was appointed Minister of Public Health, succeeding Michael Matheson who was promoted to the Cabinet.

In May 2016, Watt was re-elected for Aberdeen South and North Kincardine. On 18 May 2016 she was moved to the post of Minister for Mental Health in a reshuffle.

== Family ==
Watt is the daughter of former SNP MP (1974–1979) Hamish Watt. She is married with two children. One of them, Stuart Donaldson, served as an SNP MP for Aberdeenshire West and Kincardine in the British Parliament between 2015 and 2017.

Scottish Parliament
Preceded by Nicol Stephen as MSP for Aberdeen South	Member of the Scottish Parliament for Aberdeen South & North Kincardine; 2011–2021	Succeeded by Audrey Nicoll
