= Aberdeen South (Scottish Parliament constituency) =

Constituency of the Scottish Parliament

- Former burgh constituency for the Scottish Parliament
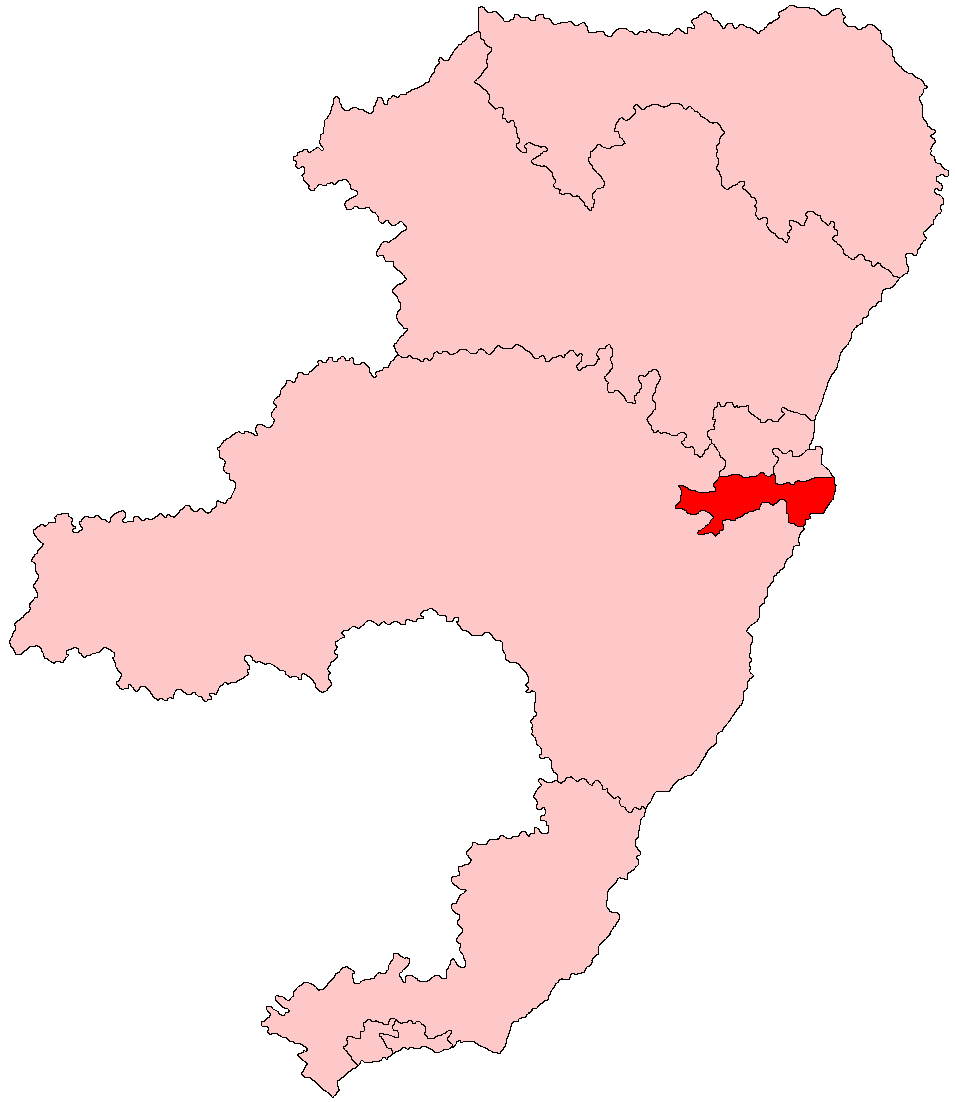

- Aberdeen South shown within the North East Scotland electoral region and the region shown within Scotland

Former constituency
- Created: 1999
- Abolished: 2011
- Council area: Aberdeen City (part)
- Replaced by: Aberdeen Central, Aberdeen South & North Kincardine

Aberdeen South was a constituency of the Scottish Parliament covering part of the council area of Aberdeen. It elected one Member of the Scottish Parliament (MSP) by the first past the post method of election. Under the additional-member electoral system used for elections to the Scottish Parliament it was one of nine constituencies in the North East Scotland electoral region, which elected seven additional members, in addition to nine constituency MSPs, to produce a form of proportional representation for the region as a whole.

For the 2011 Scottish Parliament election Aberdeen South was replaced by the Aberdeen South and North Kincardine constituency, which also covered part of the council area of Aberdeenshire.

== Electoral region ==
Between 1999 and 2011 the other eight constituencies of the North East Scotland region were: Aberdeen Central, Aberdeen North, Angus, Banff and Buchan, Dundee East, Dundee West, Gordon and West Aberdeenshire and Kincardine. The region covered the Aberdeenshire council area, the Aberdeen City council area, the Dundee City council area, part of the Angus council area, a small part of the Moray council area and a small part of the Perth and Kinross council area.

== Constituency boundaries ==
The Aberdeen South constituency was created at the same time as the Scottish Parliament, for the 1999 Scottish Parliament election, with the name and boundaries of the existing Aberdeen South constituency of the UK House of Commons. It lay within the Aberdeen City council area, which was divided between three North East Scotland constituencies: Aberdeen South, Aberdeen Central and Aberdeen North. All three were entirely within the city area.

Ahead of the 2005 United Kingdom general election the boundaries of the House of Commons constituencies in Scotland were altered, and there is no longer any direct link between UK and Scottish Parliament constituencies. Following the First periodic review of Scottish Parliament boundaries ahead of the 2011 Scottish Parliament election Aberdeen South was abolished. Following this review the Aberdeen City council area was divided between three seats: Aberdeen Central, Aberdeen Donside, and Aberdeen South and North Kincardine.

== Member of the Scottish Parliament ==
Election	Member	Party
1999	Nicol Stephen	Scottish Liberal Democrats
2011	constituency abolished: replaced by Aberdeen South and North Kincardine	

== Election results ==
2007 Scottish Parliament election: Aberdeen South
Party	Candidate	Votes	%	±%
Liberal Democrats	Nicol Stephen	10,843	36.3	−9.6
SNP	Maureen Watt	8,111	27.1	+12.8
Labour	Rami Okasha	5,499	18.4	−0.9
Conservative	David Davidson	5,432	18.2	+0.8
Majority		2,731	9.2	−17.4
Turnout		29,885	52.7	+0.9
Liberal Democrats hold		Swing	-11.2	

2003 Scottish Parliament election: Aberdeen South
Party	Candidate	Votes	%	±%
Liberal Democrats	Nicol Stephen	13,821	45.9	+13.3
Labour	Richard Baker	5,805	19.3	−8.2
Conservative	Ian Duncan	5,230	17.4	−2.8
SNP	Maureen Watt	4,315	14.3	−4.9
Scottish Socialist	Keith Farnsworth	953	3.2	New
Majority		8,016	26.6	+21.5
Turnout		30,124	51.8	
Liberal Democrats hold		Swing	+10.8	

1999 Scottish Parliament election: Aberdeen South
Party	Candidate	Votes	%	±%
Liberal Democrats	Nicol Stephen	11,300	32.6	N/A
Labour	Mike Elrick	9,540	27.5	N/A
Conservative	Nanette Milne	6,993	20.2	N/A
SNP	Irene McGugan	6,651	19.2	N/A
Socialist Workers	Scott Sutherland	206	0.6	N/A
Majority		1,760	5.1	N/A
Turnout		34,690		N/A
Liberal Democrats win (new seat)				

Preceded by Orkney	Constituency represented by the Deputy First Minister of Scotland; 2005–2007	Succeeded by Glasgow Govan
