= Joe FitzPatrick =

Scottish Local Government Empowerment & Planning Minister

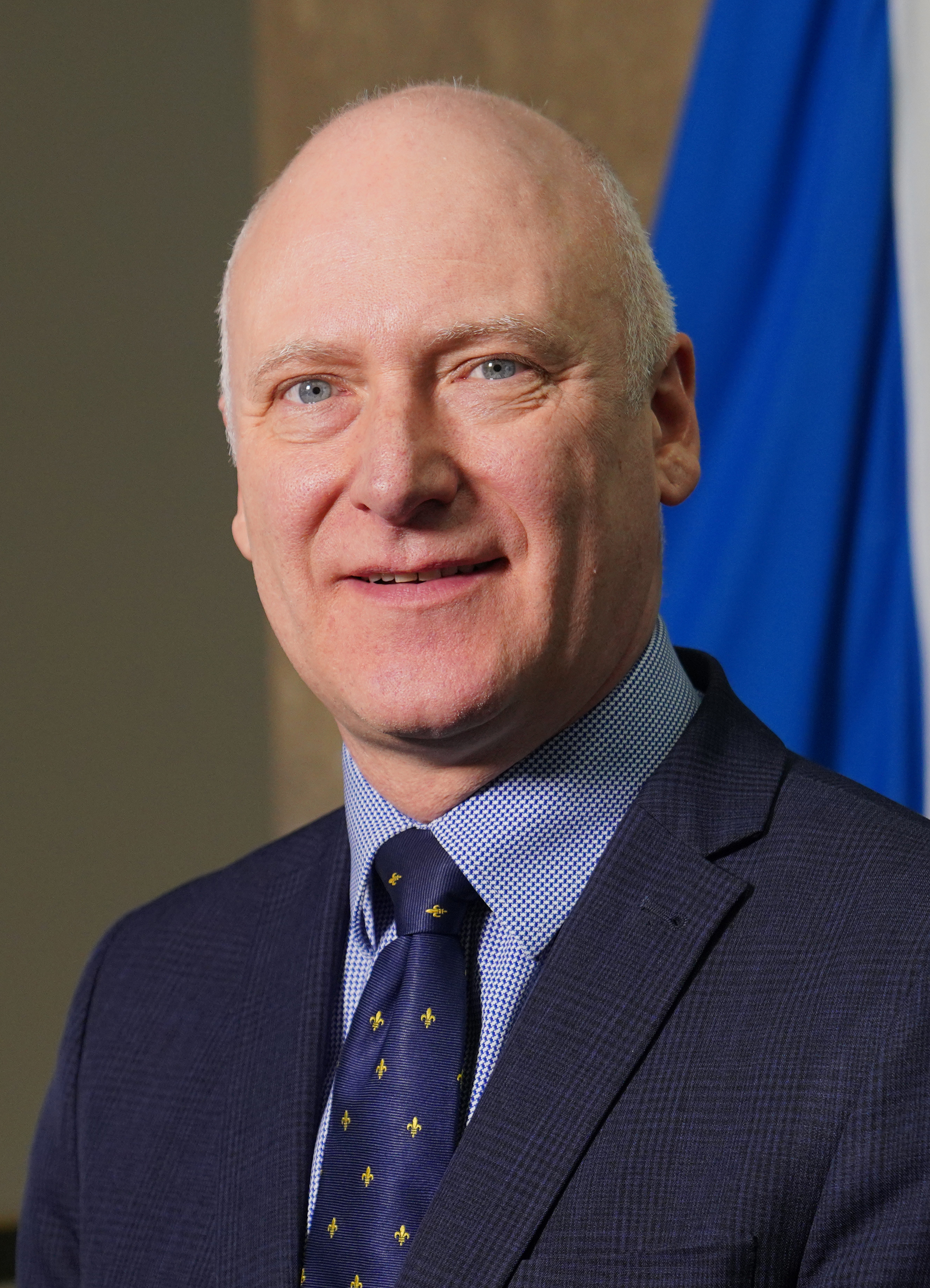
- Official portrait, 2023

Minister for Local Government Empowerment and Planning
- In office 29 March 2023 – 8 May 2024
- First Minister: Humza Yousaf
- Preceded by: Ben Macpherson
- Succeeded by: Shona Robison (Note: As Cabinet Secretary for Finance and Local Government.)

Minister for Public Health, Sport and Wellbeing
- In office 26 June 2018 – 18 December 2020
- First Minister: Nicola Sturgeon
- Preceded by: Aileen Campbell
- Succeeded by: Mairi Gougeon

Minister for Parliamentary Business
- In office 5 September 2012 – 26 June 2018
- First Minister: Alex Salmond; Nicola Sturgeon
- Preceded by: Brian Adam
- Succeeded by: Graeme Dey

Member of the Scottish Parliament for Dundee City West Dundee West (2007–2011)
- In office 3 May 2007 – 9 April 2026
- Preceded by: Kate Maclean
- Succeeded by: Heather Anderson

Personal details
- Born: 1 April 1967 (age 59) Dundee, Scotland
- Party: Scottish National Party
- Education: Abertay University
- Website: www.joe.fitzpatrick.scot

Joseph Martin FitzPatrick (born 1 April 1967) is a Scottish politician who most recently served as Minister for Local Government Empowerment and Planning from March 2023 to May 2024. A member of the Scottish National Party (SNP), he served as the Member of the Scottish Parliament (MSP) for Dundee City West from 2007 to 2026. Prior to his most recent Ministerial appointment, he was Convener of the Scottish Parliament's Equalities, Human Rights and Civil Justice Committee. He served as Minister for Public Health, Sport and Wellbeing from 2018 to until his resignation in 2020. He also served as Minister for Parliamentary Business from 2012 to 2018.

== Early life, education and career ==
Joseph Martin FitzPatrick was born on 1 April 1967 in Dundee, Scotland. He attended Whitfield Primary School and Whitfield High School. He studied Forestry at Inverness College and worked for the Forestry Commission in Angus and Tillhill Forestry in ArgyIl.

He was elected President of Inverness College Students Association and was re-elected as the College's first Sabbatical President. He was elected to the National Executive of NUS in 1990 and was given specific responsibility for LGBT issues. He was later elected as the Area Convenor for the National Union of Students from 1991-1992.

Before his election to the Scottish Parliament, FitzPatrick worked for Dundee SNP parliamentarians Shona Robison MSP and Stewart Hosie MP and was also a Dundee City Council member, SNP group whip and finance spokesperson.

== Political career ==
=== Member of the Scottish Parliament ===
After being elected MSP for Dundee West, he was elected as the SNP Group Secretary in the Parliament and was a member of the Finance Committee and SNP substitute on the Health Committee. He was also the Parliamentary Liaison Officer to John Swinney MSP (Cabinet Secretary for Finance and Sustainable Growth).

In 2007, FitzPatrick was elected to the SNP's National Executive Committee. In 2009 he co-ordinated the SNP's successful European Election Campaign.

In 2011, FitzPatrick was re-elected to the slightly enlarged Dundee City west seat with an increased majority and 57.6% of the vote. FitzPatrick went on to be appointed Convener of the Local Government and Regeneration Committee. He was Co-convener of the Cross Party Group on Renewable Energy and Energy Efficiency and Convener of the Cross Party Group on Computer Games Technology.

In 2012, FitzPatrick introduced a Members' Bill to tackle parking on pavements, double parking and parking alongside kerbs which have been lowered for wheelchair users. FitzPatrick stated: "It is clear that the current situation, with complicated police enforcement, isn’t working. We need Scottish legislation that enables local authorities to take action against inconsiderate parking." FitzPatrick stated that the Bill aimed to help pedestrians.

FitzPatrick was appointed Minister for Parliamentary Business in September 2012. He introduced the Scottish Elections (Reduction of Voting Age) Bill in 2015. The legislation allowed British, Commonwealth or EU Citizens over the age of 16 to vote in Scottish Parliament and local council elections.

Those aged over 16 were first allowed to vote in the 2014 Scottish independence referendum. 3.6 million people voted in the referendum. Over 100,000 were aged 16 to 17.

In a debate on 'Young Voters' in the Scottish Parliament on 19 February 2015, FitzPatrick stated: "...the referendum was a remarkable demonstration of democracy at its best, and it is right that the chamber both recognises and celebrates the impact that young people have had on politics and the opportunity that the extension of the franchise presents to our democracy."

FitzPatrick introduced The Lobbying (Scotland) Act 2016. The Act became law in April 2016 and sought to "increase public transparency about lobbying." On commending the Bill to Parliament, FitzPatrick stated: "The collaborative relationship between the Government, the Parliament and our stakeholders throughout the bill’s development is yet another example that supports the proud reputation of this Parliament and the Government for open engagement with civic Scotland."

In the 2016 Scottish Parliament election FitzPatrick increased his majority once more, winning 57.8% of the vote. FitzPatrick was one of ten openly LGBT MSPs.

In June 2018, FitzPatrick was appointed Minister for Public Health, Sport and Wellbeing.

In July 2018, FitzPatrick officially opened the newly rebuilt £38 million Dundee railway station.

FitzPatrick introduced The Human Tissue (Authorisation) (Scotland) Bill to Parliament on 8 June 2018. It was passed by Parliament in June 2019. Having completed all the parliamentary stages, the bill received Royal Assent and came into force in autumn 2020. The legislation introduced an opt-out system of organ and tissue donation for deceased donors. FitzPatrick stated: "Organ and tissue donation can be a life-changing gift. Evidence shows that opt-out systems can make a difference as part of a wider package of measures and this Act provides further opportunities to both save and improve lives."

As Sports Minister, FitzPatrick presided over the 2019 Solheim Cup at Gleneagles in which Europe defeated the USA, captained by Scot Catriona Matthew.

On World Aids Day 2020 (1 December), FitzPatrick commissioned plans to eliminate HIV transmission in Scotland by 2030, stating: "Scotland has made huge progress in detecting and treating HIV, and people with the virus are now able to live long, happy and healthy lives. Thanks to our leading sexual and reproductive health services, access to HIV specialist treatment and care is excellent. We are also one of the first countries in the world to have an HIV Pre-Exposure Prophylaxis service, offering free preventative medication to those deemed at highest risk of acquiring HIV. I believe we can go further and that the goal of eliminating HIV transmission is now in sight."

In December 2020, FitzPatrick welcomed a review which made it easier for gay and bisexual men to donate blood in Scotland. FitzPatrick stated: "I welcome the recommendations... which will enable a more individualised risk assessment approach to blood donor safety checks while continuing to ensure the safe supply of blood to patients. We are committed to equality and inclusion, and these changes will ensure a fairer and more up to date assessment of risk is applied to both men and women to identify whether donors may be at risk of a blood-borne virus infection."

In December 2020, figures were released revealing that 1,264 people in Scotland had died from drug overdoses in 2019 – the highest number in Europe and three and a half times the rate in England and Wales. Activist Darren McGarvey claimed FitzPatrick as Public Health Minister was "incapable of leading us anywhere but the mortuary" and opposition parties tabled a motion of no confidence in him in Holyrood. Two days before FitzPatrick left office as Public Health Minister he was challenged to attend an unsanctioned mobile drug consumption facility which was parked outside Holyrood by activist Peter Krykant. FitzPatrick supported calls for a supervised overdose prevention facility pilot in Scotland. The law to facilitate this remains reserved to the UK Government. FitzPatrick stated: "It’s clear the Misuse of Drugs Act is no longer fit for purpose. To enable innovations, such as a safer drug consumption facility, the law needs to change. We hope the UK Government will listen to the call from Scotland to make the necessary changes in the law to allow this to happen." First Minister Nicola Sturgeon told Parliament that the figures were "indefensible". FitzPatrick resigned, commenting that it had been the “privilege of my life to serve in the Scottish Government” but that the "most heart-breaking and difficult problems" he faced as public health minister were the harms and deaths caused by drug use.

In June 2022, FitzPatrick met with Krykant and charity Cranstoun in the Scottish Parliament to discuss proposals for an overdose prevention centre (OPC) in Dundee. FitzPatrick backed the calls and signed Cranstoun's pledge.

In the 2021 Scottish Parliament election FitzPatrick increased his majority to almost 13,000 votes over Scottish Labour. He was appointed Convener of the Scottish Parliament's Equalities, Human Rights and Civil Justice Committee.

In 2022, FitzPatrick led a Members' Debate in the Scottish Parliament condemning the findings of an investigation, undertaken by The Courier and Press & Journal, which found that 60% of female respondents had experienced sexism in football. FitzPatrick stated to Parliament: "I truly believe that by working together we can tackle sexism and misogyny in football and in wider society. We all know the benefits of playing sport—it improves physical and mental health, tackles isolation and loneliness and boosts self-esteem. Those benefits should be available to everyone, regardless of gender, race or ability."

At First Minister's Questions on 12 May 2022, FitzPatrick condemned reports of sexist, racist and homophobic comments at the Scottish Football Writers’ Association gala dinner. Nicola Sturgeon in response stated: "I very much agree with those sentiments. From what I have read about what occurred at that particular awards dinner, it was unacceptable. I pay tribute to Eilidh Barbour and others, who courageously took a stand against it and spoke out. It is never easy for any woman to speak out in that way, particularly in what is traditionally a man’s world, and Eilidh Barbour and her colleagues deserve credit for doing so." The Scottish Football Writers’ Association apologised after a speaker’s sexist and misogynistic jokes prompted attendees to walk out of its annual awards dinner.

FitzPatrick was appointed Minister for Local Government Empowerment and Planning in March 2023 by First Minister Humza Yousaf. In May 2024, FitzPatrick stood down from Government as John Swinney was elected First Minister. FitzPatrick stated: "I supported your candidacy and I look forward to your leadership of the SNP and to you delivering your policy programme as FM. However, I believe that this would be a good opportunity for me to step down from my role as Minister for Local Government Empowerment and Planning. It has been an honour to serve in the last government and I am proud of working with COSLA and Scotland's 32 local authorities during that time, particularly to deliver a council tax freeze to support people through the current Westminster made cost living crisis. I know it's progressive policies like this that can make a difference to people and you will continue to take forward as First Minister and I commend your focus on child poverty. I will support you in your endeavours but feel it would be best to do so out of government."

On 28 January 2025, FitzPatrick announced he would not seek re-election at the 2026 Scottish Parliament election.

On 25 March 2026, FitzPatrick used his last contribution in The Scottish Parliament to seek an "absolute commitment" from First Minister John Swinney that, if re-elected, his government would ban conversion practices in Scotland. FitzPatrick stated: "Scotland has made great strides towards equality under the SNP, but those practices remain a stain on our country. Conversion practices should be banned as quickly as possible."

Swinney committed to banning conversion practices in the first year of his government, if re-elected. He also paid tribute to FitzPatrick's public service, stating: "Given that this is Joe FitzPatrick’s last contribution in the Parliament after his 19 years of service, it is appropriate that it is on this topic, in respect of which he has given impressive leadership in advancing the rights of individuals in our society and has been a champion of equality. I pay a warm tribute to my friend and colleague Joe FitzPatrick as he stands down from the Parliament today."

== See also ==
- Government of the 3rd Scottish Parliament

== Notes ==
Scottish Parliament
Preceded by Kate Maclean	Member of the Scottish Parliament for Dundee West; 2007–2026	Incumbent
