= Banff and Buchan (Scottish Parliament constituency) =

Constituency of the Scottish Parliament

- Former county constituency for the Scottish Parliament
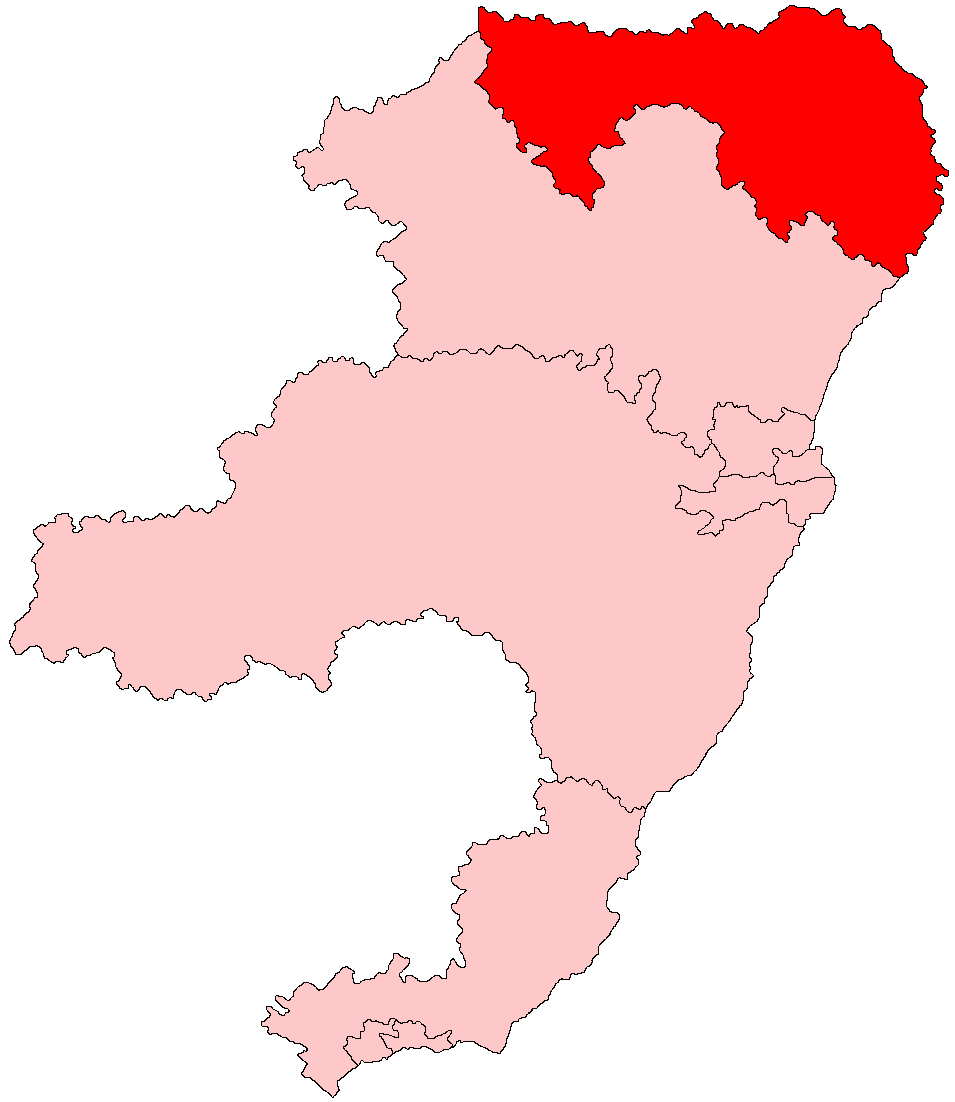

- Banff and Buchan shown within the North East Scotland electoral region and the region shown within Scotland

Former constituency
- Created: 1999
- Abolished: 2011
- Council area: Aberdeenshire (part)
- Replaced by: Aberdeenshire East, Banffshire and Buchan Coast

Banff and Buchan was a constituency of the Scottish Parliament used between 1999 and 2011. It elected one Member of the Scottish Parliament (MSP) by the first past the post method of election. Under the additional-member electoral system used for elections to the Scottish Parliament it was also one of nine constituencies in the North East Scotland electoral region, which elected seven additional members, in addition to nine constituency MSPs, to produce a form of proportional representation for the region as a whole.

== Electoral region ==
Until the 2011 election, the other eight constituencies of the North East Scotland region were: Aberdeen Central, Aberdeen North, Aberdeen South, Angus, Dundee East, Dundee West, Gordon and West Aberdeenshire and Kincardine

The region covered the Aberdeenshire council area, the Aberdeen City council area, the Dundee City council area, part of the Angus council area, a small part of the Moray council area and a small part of the Perth and Kinross council area.

== History ==
The Banff and Buchan constituency was created at the same time as the Scottish Parliamentat, for the 1999 Scottish Parliament election, using the name and boundaries of the existing Banff and Buchan constituency of the UK House of Commons. Ahead of the 2005 United Kingdom general election the boundaries of the House of Commons constituencies in Scotland were altered, and there is no longer any direct link between UK and Scottish Parliament constituencies. Following the first periodic review of Scottish Parliament boundaries, Banff and Buchan was abolished, being largely replaced by the new seat of Banffshire and Buchan Coast for the 2011 Scottish Parliament election.

== Council area ==
Banff and Buchan covered a northern portion of the Aberdeenshire council area. The rest of the Aberdeenshire area was covered by two other constituencies, both also in the North East Scotland electoral region: Gordon was the constituency to the south of the Banff and Buchan constituency, and the former West Aberdeenshire and Kincardine was further south. Gordon also covered a small eastern portion of the Moray council area.

== Members of the Scottish Parliament ==
Election	Member	Party
1999	Alex Salmond	Scottish National Party
2001	Stewart Stevenson	Scottish National Party
2011	constituency abolished: replaced by Aberdeenshire East and Banffshire and Buchan Coast	

== Election results ==
2007 Scottish Parliament election: Banff and Buchan
Party	Candidate	Votes	%	±%
SNP	Stewart Stevenson	16,031	58.8	+5.9
Conservative	Geordie Burnett Stuart	5,501	20.2	−0.7
Labour	Kay Barnett	3,136	11.5	+0.5
Liberal Democrats	Alison McInnes	2,617	9.6	+1.1
Majority		10,530	38.6	+6.6
Turnout		27,285	48.4	−0.7
SNP hold		Swing		

2003 Scottish Parliament election: Banff and Buchan
Party	Candidate	Votes	%	±%
SNP	Stewart Stevenson	13,827	52.9	+0.3
Conservative	Stewart Whyte	5,463	20.9	+3.9
Labour	Iain Brotchie	2,885	11.0	−2.6
Liberal Democrats	Debra Storr	2,227	8.5	−8.3
Independent	Alan Buchan	907	3.5	New
Scottish Socialist	Alice Rowan	840	3.2	New
Majority		8,364	31.99	−3.6
Turnout		26,149	49.15	
SNP hold		Swing		

Scottish parliamentary by-election, 2001: Banff and Buchan
Party	Candidate	Votes	%	±%
SNP	Stewart Stevenson	15,386	49.6	−3.0
Conservative	Ted Brocklebank	6,819	22.0	+5.0
Labour	Megan Harris	4,897	15.8	+2.2
Liberal Democrats	Kenyon Wright	3,231	10.4	−6.3
Scottish Socialist	Peter Anderson	682	2.2	New
Majority		8,567	27.6	−7.98
Turnout		31,015		
SNP hold		Swing		

1999 Scottish Parliament election: Banff and Buchan
Party	Candidate	Votes	%	±%
SNP	Alex Salmond	16,695	52.6	N/A
Conservative	David Davidson	5,403	17.0	N/A
Liberal Democrats	Maitland Mackie	5,315	16.8	N/A
Labour	Megan Harris	4,321	13.6	N/A
Majority		11,292	35.6	N/A
Turnout		31,734		N/A
SNP win (new seat)				
