= Gordon (Scottish Parliament constituency) =

Scottish Parliament constituency

- Former county constituency for the Scottish Parliament
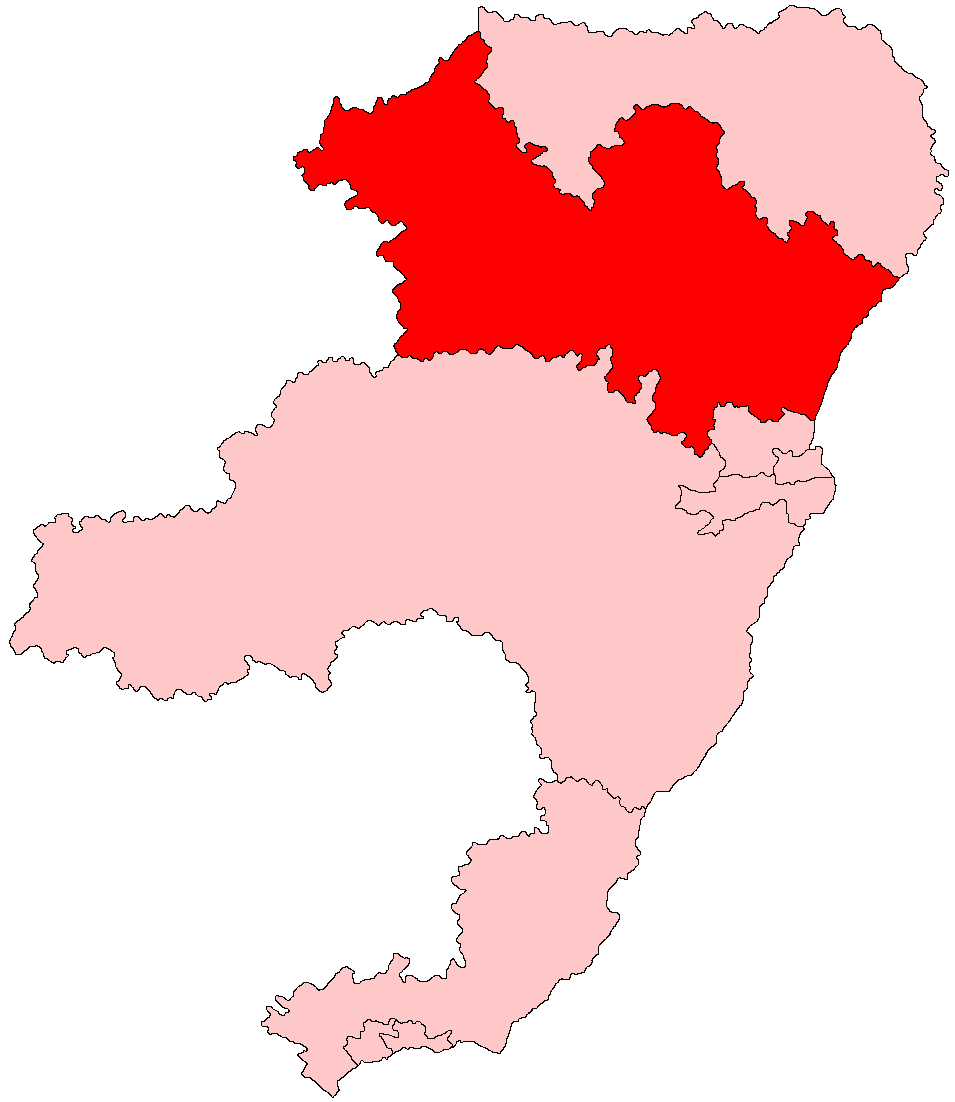

- Gordon shown within the North East Scotland electoral region and the region shown within Scotland

Former constituency
- Created: 1999; 27 years ago
- Abolished: 2011; 15 years ago
- Council area: Aberdeenshire (part); Moray (part)
- Replaced by: Aberdeenshire East, Aberdeenshire West, Moray

Gordon was a constituency of the Scottish Parliament. It elected one Member of the Scottish Parliament (MSP) by the first past the post method of election. It was one of nine constituencies in the North East Scotland electoral region, which elected seven additional members, in addition to nine constituency MSPs, to produce a form of proportional representation for the region as a whole.

== Electoral region ==
At the time of this constituency the other eight constituencies of the North East Scotland region were; Aberdeen Central, Aberdeen North, Aberdeen South, Angus, Banff and Buchan, Dundee East, Dundee West and West Aberdeenshire and Kincardine

The electoral region covered Aberdeenshire, Aberdeen City, Dundee City; part of Angus; and small parts of Moray and Perth and Kinross.

== Constituency boundaries ==
The Gordon constituency was created at the same time as the Scottish Parliament, in 1999, with the name and boundaries of an existing Westminster constituency. In 2005, however, the boundaries of the Westminster (House of Commons) constituency were subject to some alteration.

=== Council areas ===
The Scottish Parliament constituency of Gordon covered a central portion of the Aberdeenshire council area and a small eastern portion of the Moray council area. The rest of the Aberdeenshire area was covered by two other constituencies, both also in the North East Scotland electoral region: Banff and Buchan to the north of the Gordon constituency, and West Aberdeenshire and Kincardine to the south. The rest of the Moray area was covered by the Moray constituency, which is in the Highlands and Islands region.

== Boundary Review ==
Following their First Periodic review of constituencies to the Scottish Parliament, the Boundary Commission for Scotland replaced Gordon with the seat called Aberdeenshire East.

== Member of the Scottish Parliament ==
The seat was represented since the 2007 election by Alex Salmond, the First Minister. He was previously MSP for Banff and Buchan from 1999 until resigning in 2001; he also represented the Westminster seat of Banff and Buchan from 1987 until retiring from the UK Parliament in 2010. He later served again in the UK Parliament from 2015 to 2017 as MP for the Westminster seat of Gordon.

Election	Member	Party
1999	Nora Radcliffe	Liberal Democrats
2007	Alex Salmond	SNP
2011	constituency abolished: see Aberdeenshire East; Aberdeenshire West and Moray	

== Election results ==
2007 Scottish Parliament election: Gordon
Party	Candidate	Votes	%	±%
SNP	Alex Salmond	14,650	41.4	+18.8
Liberal Democrats	Nora Radcliffe	12,588	35.6	−2.5
Conservative	Nanette Milne	5,348	15.1	−8.8
Labour	Neil Cardwell	2,276	6.4	−3.9
Independent	Donald Marr	199	0.6	New
Independent	Dave Mathers	185	0.5	New
Scottish Enterprise	Bob Ingram	117	0.3	New
Majority		2,062	5.8	N/A
Turnout		35,363	54.1	+6.6
SNP gain from Liberal Democrats		Swing	+10.7	

2003 Scottish Parliament election: Gordon
Party	Candidate	Votes	%	±%
Liberal Democrats	Nora Radcliffe	10,963	38.1	+1.4
Conservative	Nanette Milne	6,892	24.0	+4.4
SNP	Alasdair Allan	6,501	22.6	−1.7
Labour	Ellis Thorpe	2,973	10.3	−1.4
Scottish Socialist	John Sangster	730	2.5	New
Independent	Steven Mathers	689	2.4	New
Majority		4071	14.1	+1.7
Turnout		28,748	47.5	
Liberal Democrats hold		Swing	-1.5	

1999 Scottish Parliament election: Gordon
Party	Candidate	Votes	%	±%
Liberal Democrats	Nora Radcliffe	12,353	36.7	N/A
SNP	Sandy Stronach	8,158	24.3	N/A
Conservative	Alex Johnstone	6,602	19.6	N/A
Labour	Gillian Carlin-Kulwicki	3,950	11.7	N/A
Independent	Hamish Watt	2,559	7.6	N/A
Majority		4,195	12.4	N/A
Turnout		33,622		N/A
Liberal Democrats win (new seat)				

Preceded by Motherwell and Wishaw	Constituency represented by the First Minister; 2007 – 2011	Succeeded by Aberdeenshire East
