= Mike Rumbles =

Scottish politician (born 1956)

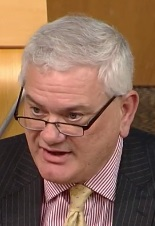
- Rumbles in 2017

Member of the Scottish Parliament for North East Scotland West Aberdeenshire and Kincardine (1999–2011)
- In office 5 May 2016 – 5 May 2021
- In office 6 May 1999 – 22 March 2011
- Preceded by: Constituency established
- Succeeded by: Dennis Robertson (Aberdeenshire West)

Personal details
- Born: Michael John Rumbles; 10 June 1956 (age 70) South Shields, England
- Party: Scottish Liberal Democrats
- Spouse: Pauline Rumbles
- Children: 2 sons
- Education: Sunderland Polytechnic; Royal Military Academy Sandhurst; Aberystwyth University; University of Leicester

Michael John Rumbles (born 10 June 1956) is a former Scottish Liberal Democrat politician. He served as a Member of the Scottish Parliament (MSP) for the North East Scotland electoral region from 2016 to 2021, having previously represented the West Aberdeenshire and Kincardine constituency from 1999 until 2011.

== Background ==
Rumbles was born in South Shields in England and was educated at St James School in Hebburn, County Durham, Sunderland Polytechnic where he graduated with a BEd, and Royal Military Academy Sandhurst. He served in the Royal Army Education Corps retiring as a Major in October 1994.

Rumbles obtained an MSc in economics at Aberystwyth University and he studied at the University of Leicester where he completed a PGD in Employment Law.

== Political career ==
=== Member of the Scottish Parliament ===
Rumbles was elected to the Scottish Parliament, for the West Aberdeenshire and Kincardine constituency, in the 1999 election, securing 12,838 votes.

Following the Scottish Parliament's establishment in 1999, Rumbles was Convenor of the Standards Committee when it was charged with investigating the so-called 'Lobbygate' scandal, in which the son of the then Secretary of State for Scotland John Reid was embroiled. He promoted the legislation to establish an independent Standards Commissioner, the first Committee Bill of the Parliament.

He comfortably held West Aberdeenshire and Kincardine in the 2003 election, increasing his share of the vote to 46%.

Rumbles was re-elected at the 2007 Scottish Parliament election, with 14,314 votes (41.4%), a reduction by 4.9%.

The Scottish Liberal Democrats had a poor showing at the 2011 Scottish Parliament election, dropping down to 5 MSPs). Rumbles, who had sought re-election in the successor Aberdeenshire West constituency, lost out to Dennis Robertson of the Scottish National Party (SNP). He took 8,074 votes (28.2%), finishing second.

At the 2016 Scottish Parliament election, Rumbles stood again in Aberdeenshire West, where he came third with 7,262 votes (20.6%). He was elected as a member for the North East Scotland region, having been the lead Liberal Democrat candidate there.

Rumbles did not contest the 2021 Scottish Parliament election.

=== Scottish Liberal Democrat leadership contests ===
On 12 May 2005, Rumbles announced his intention to stand for the vacant post of leader of the Scottish Liberal Democrats. His candidacy involved a distinct platform from his opponent Nicol Stephen. In particular, he specified a number of 'deal-breakers' for any coalition negotiations that might occur in the aftermath of the 2007 Scottish Parliament elections, with an absolute insistence on the implementation of key Liberal Democrat policies such as abolition of the council tax, and an enhancement of the Scottish Parliament's powers. He also aimed to give the Liberal Democrats a more equal status within the coalition. He lost to Stephen in June 2005, winning 23.4% of the vote.

On 2 July 2008, following Stephen's surprise resignation as leader, Rumbles again announced his intention to stand for the Scottish Liberal Democrat leadership. This time he stressed his commitment to reviewing party policy on whether to hold a national referendum on Scottish independence (the policy of the Scottish National Party government). In the contest he faced former Ministers Ross Finnie and Tavish Scott. Scott won the contest comfortably.

== Personal life ==
Rumbles married Pauline Sillars in 1985. They have two sons.

Scottish Parliament
New parliament Scotland Act 1998	Member of the Scottish Parliament for West Aberdeenshire and Kincardine; 1999–2011	Succeeded by Dennis Robertson as MSP for Aberdeenshire West
