= David Davidson (Scottish politician) =

Scottish Conservative politician (1943–2024)

Member of the Scottish Parliament for North East Scotland (1 of 7 Regional MSPs)
- In office 6 May 1999 – 2 April 2007

Personal details
- Born: 25 January 1943 Edinburgh, Scotland
- Died: 14 June 2024 (aged 81) Melrose, Scotland
- Party: Scottish Conservative

David Davidson (25 January 1943 – 14 June 2024) was a Scottish Conservative and Unionist politician. He was a Member of the Scottish Parliament (MSP), serving as one of the additional members for the North East Scotland region, from 1999 to 2007.

Davidson was previously a councillor in Stirling. While in parliament, he was a director of the Scottish Parliament Business Exchange from 2001 until 2007.

After leaving parliament, he was employed at Caledonia Consulting as a lobbyist along with former Labour politician Mike Watson.

In 2005 Davidson resigned as Conservative Health spokesperson after newspaper reports alleged he had been involved in an affair with SNP MSP Christine Grahame.

Davidson died in Melrose on 14 June 2024, at the age of 81.
