= Dundee East =

Dundee East may mean or refer to:

- Dundee East (UK Parliament constituency)
- Dundee East (Scottish Parliament constituency)

== See also ==
- East Dundee, Illinois
