= Stewart Hosie =

Scottish politician (born 1963)

The Right Honourable Stewart Hosie
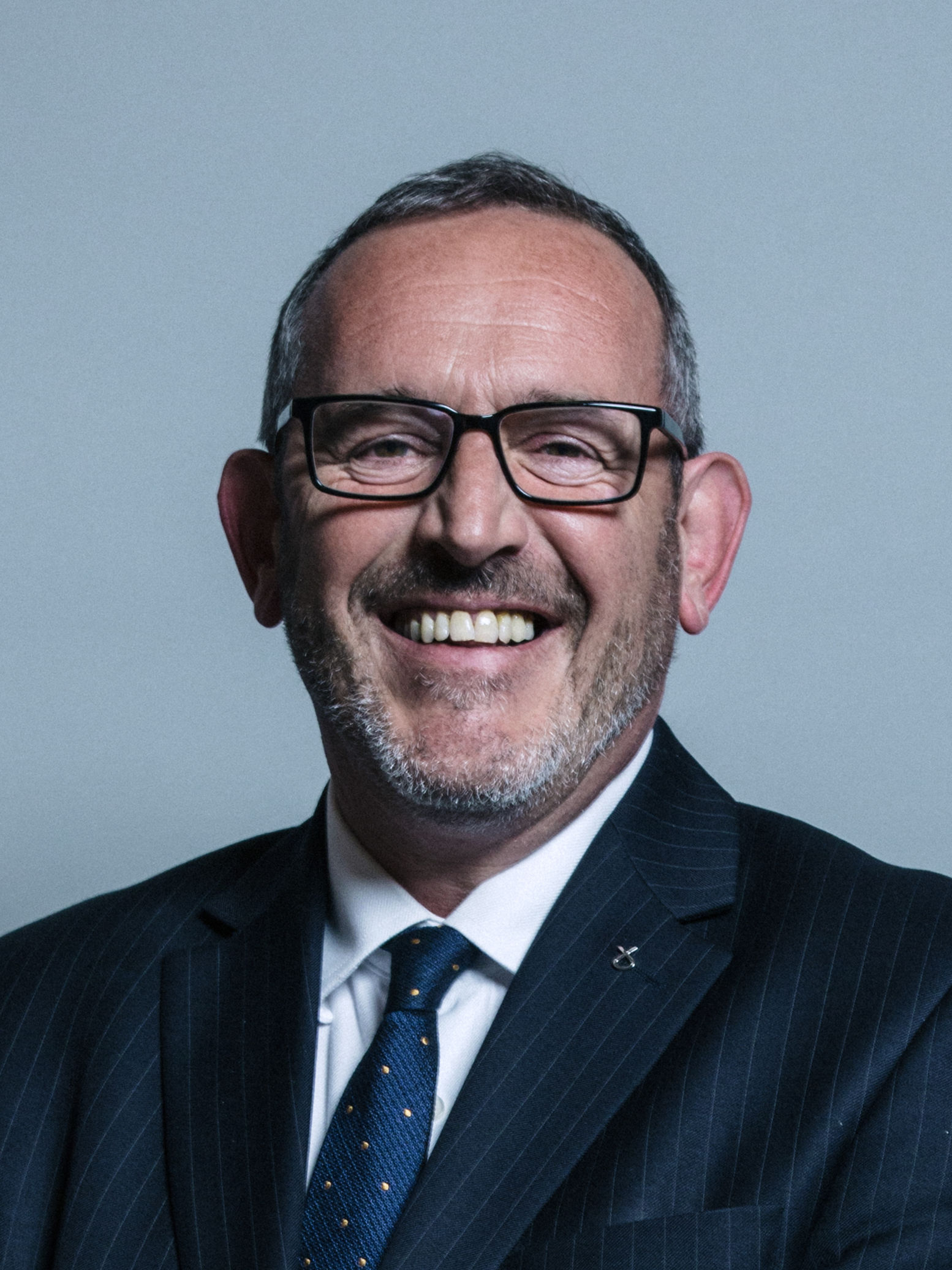
- Official portrait, 2017

SNP Treasury Spokesperson in the House of Commons
- In office 10 December 2022 – 4 September 2023
- Leader: Stephen Flynn
- Preceded by: Alison Thewliss
- Succeeded by: Drew Hendry
- In office 8 May 2015 – 14 June 2017
- Leader: Angus Robertson
- Preceded by: Office established
- Succeeded by: Kirsty Blackman

SNP Shadow Chancellor of the Duchy of Lancaster Shadow Minister for the Cabinet Office
- In office 1 February 2021 – 10 December 2022
- Leader: Ian Blackford
- Preceded by: Pete Wishart
- Succeeded by: Kirsty Blackman

Deputy Leader of the Scottish National Party in the House of Commons
- In office 15 June 2010 – 14 June 2017
- Leader: Angus Robertson
- Preceded by: Office established
- Succeeded by: Kirsty Blackman

Depute Leader of the Scottish National Party
- In office 14 November 2014 – 13 October 2016
- Leader: Nicola Sturgeon
- Preceded by: Nicola Sturgeon
- Succeeded by: Angus Robertson

Member of Parliament for Dundee East
- In office 5 May 2005 – 30 May 2024
- Preceded by: Iain Luke
- Succeeded by: Constituency abolished

Personal details
- Born: 3 January 1963 (age 63) Dundee, Scotland
- Party: Scottish National Party
- Spouse(s): Shona Robison (m. 1997, div. 2017); Serena Cowdy (m. 2018)
- Children: 1
- Education: Abertay University
- Website: Official website

Stewart Hosie (born 3 January 1963) is a Scottish National Party (SNP) politician who served as Member of Parliament (MP) for Dundee East from 2005 to 2024. He served as the SNP Treasury Spokesperson from 2022 to 2023, and previously from 2015 to 2017. He served as the SNP Shadow Chancellor of the Duchy of Lancaster and Shadow Minister for the Cabinet Office since 2021. He served as Deputy Leader of the SNP to Nicola Sturgeon from November 2014 to October 2016. He was also the SNP Deputy Westminster Leader and the SNP Treasury Spokesperson from May 2015, until he was succeeded in both positions by Kirsty Blackman in June 2017.

== Background ==
Born in Dundee, Stewart Hosie was educated at Brackens Primary School, Invertay Primary School Monifieth and Carnoustie High School. He then attended Dundee Institute of Technology where he gained a Higher Diploma in Computer Studies. He worked in IT for 20 years and ran his own business. From 1986 to 1989 he was the SNP's first Youth Convener. From 1999, he spent four years as the Party's National Secretary before being elected as the Organisation Convener in 2003.

== Political career ==
Following his election to the House of Commons as the Member for Dundee East in 2005, Hosie was appointed the SNP Spokesperson for Home Affairs and Women, positions which he held until 2007. He was also appointed SNP Spokesperson for the Treasury. In 2010, he was appointed Deputy Leader and Chief Whip of the SNP Westminster Group. In the Commons, Hosie became an outspoken critic of the Welfare Reform Act 2012.

However, in 2014, Hosie and most of his SNP colleagues missed a vote on repealing the bedroom tax – the most controversial aspect of the legislation – despite the SNP making opposition to the policy a central part of its campaign for a yes vote in that year's independence referendum. Labour said: "Far from standing up for Scotland, the SNP have stayed at home and let Scotland down."

He has taken an interest in the Prudential Regulation Authority. He sits on the Commons Treasury Select Committee. Hosie is known for his support and representation of charities, including the anti-sectarian charity Nil By Mouth, children's charity the Smart Play Network, and humanitarian organisation Islamic Relief. He is also a member of the All Party Parliamentary Friends of the Baháʼí.

=== SNP deputy leadership bid, 2014 ===
Following defeat in the 2014 Scottish independence referendum, Scottish National Party leader and First Minister of Scotland Alex Salmond announced his resignation as SNP leader and First Minister of Scotland.

In the aftermath of his resignation, a leadership bid was launched, and SNP deputy leader Nicola Sturgeon stood down to stand for leader, triggering a deputy leader contest.

The results of the election were announced at the SNP's Autumn conference on 14 November 2014, with Hosie polling 42.2%, Keith Brown on 34.2% and Angela Constance on 23.5% in the first round of the single transferable vote election. In the second round, Hosie was elected after getting 55.5% of votes following the elimination of Constance. Turnout was 55% of SNP members.

=== Elections contested ===
First standing for election to the House of Commons at the 1992 general election in Kirkcaldy, he later stood for both the Westminster and Scottish Parliament. He contested Kirkcaldy again at the 1997 general election, and also contested Kirkcaldy (Scottish Parliament constituency) at the 1999 Scottish Parliament election. At the 2001 general election, he contested Dundee East and reduced Labour's majority from 9,961 votes at the previous election to 4,466 votes. and was eventually elected at the 2005 general election, gaining the seat from Labour. Hosie retained the seat with an increased majority at the 2010 general election. Hosie announced in June 2023 that he would stand down at the 2024 general election.

==== UK Parliament elections ====
| Date of election | Constituency | Party | Votes | % | Result |
|---|---|---|---|---|---|
| 1992 | Kirkcaldy | SNP | 8,761 | 22.5 | Not Elected (2nd) |
| 1997 | Kirkcaldy | SNP | 8,020 | 22.9 | Not Elected (2nd) |
| 2001 | Dundee East | SNP | 10,169 | 31.4 | Not Elected (2nd) |
| 2005 | Dundee East | SNP | 14,708 | 37.2 | Elected |
| 2010 | Dundee East | SNP | 15,350 | 37.8 | Elected |
| 2015 | Dundee East | SNP | 28,765 | 59.7 | Elected |
| 2017 | Dundee East | SNP | 18,391 | 42.8 | Elected |
| 2019 | Dundee East | SNP | 24,361 | 53.8 | Elected |

==== Scottish Parliament elections ====
| Date of election | Constituency | Party | Votes | % | Result |
|---|---|---|---|---|---|
| 1999 | Kirkcaldy | SNP | 9,170 | 32.4 | Not Elected (2nd) |

== Personal life ==
Hosie has two siblings. Hosie was married to Shona Robison, MSP for Dundee City East and Cabinet Secretary for Health, Wellbeing and Sport. They had a daughter.

In 2012, he suffered from a transient ischaemic attack (minor stroke), and was treated in Ninewells Hospital in Dundee. He is a supporter of Dundee United.

In May 2016, Hosie and Robison announced that they had separated. This was followed by reports that Hosie and his colleague Angus Macneil had both had an affair with Westminster-based freelance journalist Serena Cowdy. On 22 May 2016, Hosie announced his intention not to stand for re-election as Deputy Leader, due to "intense scrutiny" by the media of his private life, meaning that his term of office would end at the SNP's annual conference later in the year.

In August 2018, Hosie married Serena Cowdy in Arbroath, Scotland.

Party political offices
| Preceded by Alasdair Morgan | National Secretary of the Scottish National Party; 1999–2003 | Succeeded by Alasdair Allan |
| Preceded by Nicola Sturgeon | Depute Leader of the Scottish National Party; 2014–2016 | Succeeded by Angus Robertson |
| Vacant Last known title holder: John Swinney | Deputy Leader of the Scottish National Party in the House of Commons; 2010–2017 | Succeeded by Kirsty Blackman |
Parliament of the United Kingdom
| Preceded by Iain Luke | Member of Parliament for Dundee East; 2005–2024 | Succeeded by Stephen Gethins as Member for Arbroath and Broughty Ferry |
