= Iain Luke =

British politician (born 1951)

Member of Parliament for Dundee East
- In office 7 June 2001 – 11 April 2005
- Preceded by: John McAllion
- Succeeded by: Stewart Hosie

Personal details
- Born: Iain Malone Luke; 8 October 1951 (age 74) Dundee, United Kingdom
- Party: Labour
- Spouse: Marie
- Education: University of Edinburgh, University of Dundee

Iain Malone Luke (born 8 October 1951, Dundee) is a retired Labour Party politician in Scotland. He was the Member of Parliament (MP) for Dundee East from 2001 until being unseated at the 2005 general election by Stewart Hosie of the Scottish National Party (SNP).

== Biography ==
Iain Luke was educated at Stobswell Boys' Junior Secondary School and the Harris Academy (then a grammar school) in Dundee. He attended the University of Dundee, gaining an MA in Political Science and Modern History in 1980, and the University of Edinburgh, where he gained a postgraduate diploma in Business Administration in 1981.

From 1969–1974, he was an assistant collector of taxes in Dundee and London. From 1974–75, he was an assistant sales manager for Brown & Tawse, steel stockholders, in Dundee.

From 1982–1986, he was a part-time lecturer in General Studies at Angus Further Education College (now Angus College) in Arbroath. He had previously been leader of Dundee City Council, being on the council from 1996–2001. He was a member of Dundee District Council from 1984–1996. He was a senior lecturer at Dundee College in public administration, housing and European Studies. He is an undergraduate tutor in the Politics Department of the University of Dundee.

== Parliamentary career ==
At the 2001 general election, he was elected as Member of Parliament for Dundee East, but lost his seat to Stewart Hosie of the Scottish National Party in the 2005 general election. In the 2007 Scottish Parliament election, he stood for election in the constituency of the same name, but was defeated by Stewart Hosie's wife, and incumbent MSP, Shona Robison.

== Personal life ==
He is married to wife Marie, who has now died, and they have a son and two daughters.

Parliament of the United Kingdom
Preceded by John McAllion	Member of Parliament for Dundee East; 2001–2005	Succeeded by Stewart Hosie
