= 1973 Dundee East by-election =

UK parliamentary by-election

The 1973 Dundee East by-election, in Scotland, was held on 1 March 1973. It was one of three UK parliamentary by-elections held on that day. It was caused by the appointment of George Thomson as a European commissioner. George Machin retained the seat for Labour, but only narrowly. There was a strong showing by the Scottish National Party, which prefigured their serious breakthrough at the Govan by-election later in the year, and the two general elections of 1974.

== Background ==
Thomson had represented the seat since winning it in a a by-election in 1952. Since the seat's creation in 1950 it had returned Labour members, and until the 1970 general election Labour's majorities over the second placed Conservative candidates had ranged from a low of 3,805 votes in 1951 to a high of 8,126 at the 1952 by-election. However, in 1970 the Labour vote share fell below 50% for the first time and Thomson's majority over the second-placed Conservative candidate Allan Stewart was 2,798 votes, the lowest yet seen in the seat. At the same contest the SNP, who had previously only contested the seat at the 1952 by-election, had come third with 8.9% of the votes.

Dundee's Lord Provost William Fitzgerald was chosen as the Conservative candidate by the Dundee Conservative and Unionist Association from a short leet of six. During the campaign Fitzgerald pledged action to try to prevent the loss of 70 jobs at the local Robb Caledon shipyard.

The contest was viewed as three-way fight, although the Conservatives and Labour claimed it was a contest between their candidates. Fitzgerald's election was considered possible if his party's vote held and the SNP gained from Labour. However, SNP canvassers reportedly thought they could win enough votes to repeat their surprise victory at Hamilton in 1967. The Liberal candidate Nathaniel Gordon also hoped he could pull off a shock result, but this was widely doubted. Nonetheless, Liberal leader Jeremy Thorpe came to Dundee to campaign for Gordon. There was some speculation that the Labour vote may be hurt by the fact that Machin was from Sheffield and an English candidate in a Scottish seat had angered some local Labour supporters.

== Result ==
1973 Dundee East by-election
Party	Candidate	Votes	%	±%
Labour	George Machin	14,411	32.74	−15.60
SNP	Gordon Wilson	13,270	30.15	+21.22
Conservative	William Fitzgerald	11,089	25.19	−17.17
Liberal	Nathaniel Gordon	3,653	8.30	New
Labour Party of Scotland	George MacLean	1,409	3.20	New
Independent	John S Thomson	182	0.41	New
Majority		1,141	2.59	−3.39
Turnout		44,014		
Labour hold		Swing		

== Aftermath ==
While Labour were reported to be relieved to hold the seat, it was noted that the result showed the SNP were still an electoral force. Machin's victory speech was reportedly disrupted by 'the angry shouts of Scottish Nationalist supporters' and he faced 'chants of "Go back to Yorkshire" and "Go home, Englishman". An editorial in The Glasgow Herald attributed part of the SNP's success to the issue of oil and opined that had a Public Accounts Committee report which was critical of some aspects of the Conservative Government's handling of oil policy been published earlier, the SNP might have won the seat.

Ultimately, Machin's success was short lived as Wilson built on his performance and captured the seat in the February general election the following year. He would hold it until 1987.

== See also ==
- Dundee East (UK Parliament constituency)
- List of United Kingdom by-elections (1950–1979)
- 1973 Lincoln by-election
- 1973 Chester-le-Street by-election
