= Gordon Wilson (Scottish politician) =

Scottish politician (1938–2017)

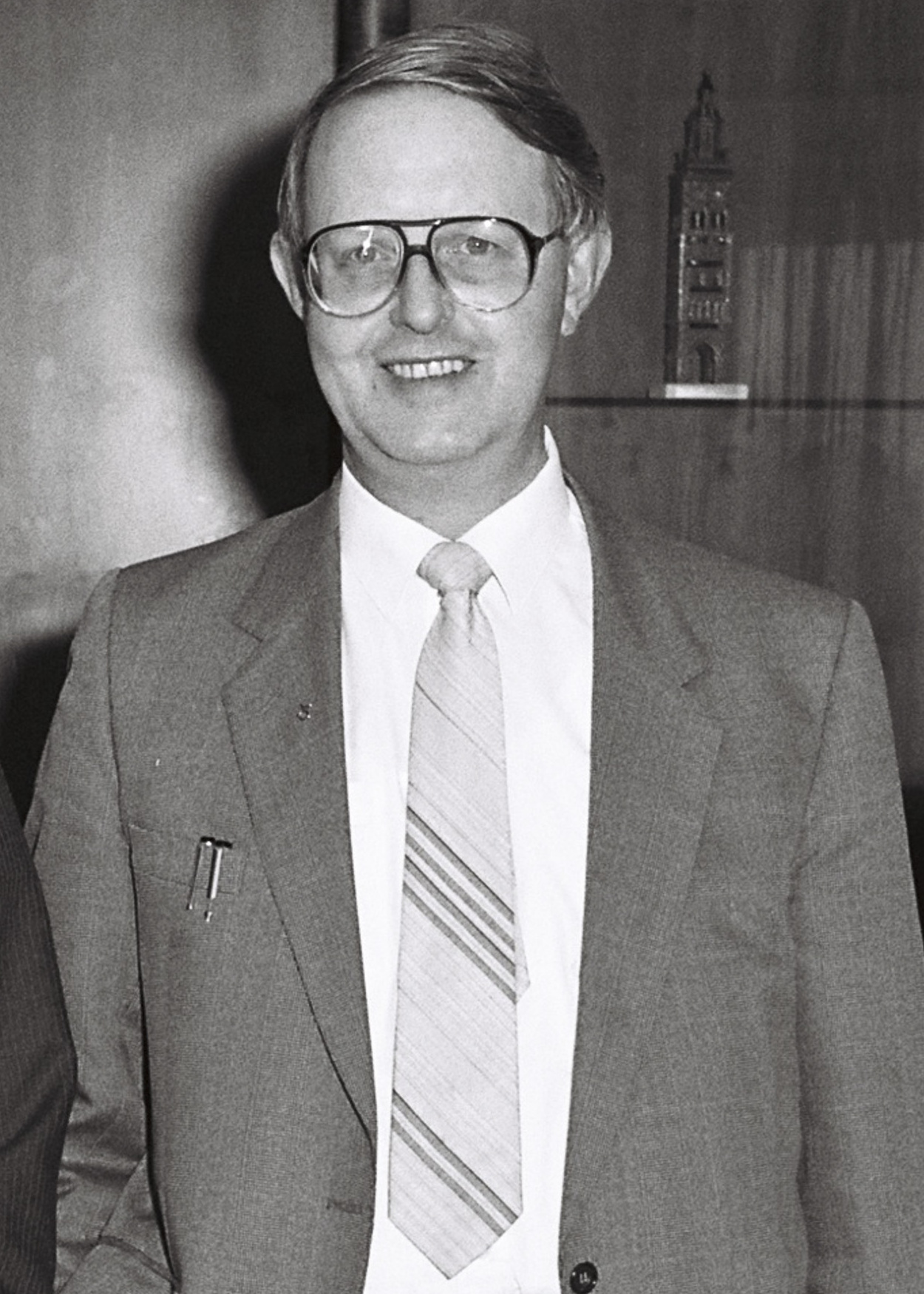

Leader of the Scottish National Party
- In office 15 September 1979 – 22 September 1990
- Preceded by: William Wolfe
- Succeeded by: Alex Salmond

Depute Leader of the Scottish National Party
- In office 1973–1974
- Leader: William Wolfe
- Preceded by: Douglas Henderson
- Succeeded by: Margo MacDonald

Member of Parliament for Dundee East
- In office 28 February 1974 – 18 May 1987
- Preceded by: George Machin
- Succeeded by: John McAllion

Personal details
- Born: Robert Gordon Wilson; 16 April 1938 Glasgow, Scotland
- Died: 25 June 2017 (aged 79) Dundee, Scotland
- Party: Scottish National Party
- Spouse: Edith Hassall (m. 1965)
- Children: 2 (Margaret and Kate)
- Education: University of Edinburgh
- Profession: Solicitor
- Religion: Free Church of Scotland

Robert Gordon Wilson (16 April 1938 – 25 June 2017) was a Scottish politician and solicitor. He was the leader of the Scottish National Party (SNP) from 1979 to 1990, and was SNP Member of Parliament (MP) for Dundee East from 1974 to 1987. He was Rector of the University of Dundee from 1983 to 1986.

== Background ==
Wilson was born in Glasgow, the son of Elizabeth Murray and Robert George Wilson, a butcher's van driver. He was educated at Douglas High School for Boys on the Isle of Man, and the University of Edinburgh, where he graduated with a Bachelor of Laws degree. Following graduation, Wilson qualified as a solicitor, and worked for T.F. Reid Solicitors in Paisley from 1963 until his election as an MP in 1974.

== Political career ==
Wilson joined the Scottish National Party in 1959, on his graduation from university. He was "controller" of the political pirate radio station Radio Free Scotland, which broadcast on a frequency used by BBC between 1956 and 1965, moving the location of the transmitter to avoid being caught. Wilson served as Assistant National Secretary of the SNP from 1963 to 1964, as National Secretary from 1964 to 1971, and was vice-chairman of the SNP Oil Campaign Committee, which was responsible for the party's iconic It's Scotland's oil campaign. It was Wilson who coined the slogan.

Wilson was Executive Vice-Chairman in 1972–1973, and while Executive Vice-Chairman he had a responsibility for oil. Wilson stood as the SNP parliamentary candidate at the Dundee East by-election in March 1973, where he was narrowly defeated by Labour's George Machin. He did however clearly out-poll the Lord Provost of Dundee, William Fitzgerald, who stood as a Conservative and was thought to have had a good chance of winning the seat. Machin was a native of Sheffield and some thought Labour made a mistake by selecting an Englishman for a Scottish seat. Anti-English feeling was reported to be shown during Machin's victory speech which was reportedly disrupted by 'angry shouts of Scottish Nationalist supporters', with 'chants of "Go back to Yorkshire" and "Go home, Englishman"'. Wilson was reported to be disappointed by losing narrowly, but was pleased by the considerable increase in the SNP vote since the last general election.

Gordon Wilson was elected as Member of Parliament for the Dundee East constituency at the February 1974 general election, and increased his majority to 6,983 at the October 1974 general election. He was the deputy leader of the SNP parliamentary group at Westminster from 1974 to 1979, and served as parliamentary spokesperson on oil and energy (1974–1983) and joint spokesperson on devolution (1976–1979).

He was one of only two SNP MPs in the aftermath of the 1979 UK general election. Anthony Finlay, writing in The Glasgow Herald opined that Wilson held his seat "only because the Labour Party was foolish enough to pick Jimmy Reid" as his opponent. On 15 September 1979, at the SNP Annual National Conference in Dundee, Wilson was elected as National Convener (leader) of the SNP, succeeding Billy Wolfe. He had with 530 votes, defeating Stephen Maxwell (117 votes) and Willie McRae (52 votes).

When Robin Cook MP moved an amendment to legalise homosexual acts to the Bill which became the Criminal Justice (Scotland) Act 1980, he stated "The clause bears the names of hon. Members from all three major parties. I regret that the only party represented among Scottish Members of Parliament from which there has been no support for the clause is the Scottish National Party. I am pleased to see both representatives of that party in their place, and I hope to convert them in the remainder of my remarks." When the amendment came to a vote, Wilson and the SNP's other MP Donald Stewart both voted against the decriminalisation of homosexual acts.

In the early 1980s when the party was in internal turmoil, and he was a key mover in condemning both Siol nan Gaidheal and the 79 Group. At the SNP's conference in Ayr in June 1982 he announced in the middle of his keynote speech that there would not be "parties within the party". Using his executive position he was able to force an emergency motion and a vote on his proposal. He received the backing he needed.

Wilson led the party through two poor general election performances in 1983 and 1987. In 1987, Wilson lost his seat to Labour's John McAllion. After his defeat at the 1987 general election he returned to legal practice.

He remained as party leader, and Jim Sillars won at the Govan by-election victory in 1988. Wilson attempted to involve the SNP in the Scottish Constitutional Convention but due to the convention's unwillingness to contemplate discussions about Scottish independence as a constitutional option the SNP did not get involved. He announced his resignation as leader of the SNP in May 1990, with Alex Salmond succeeding him.

In September 1998 he was selected by delegates at the SNP's conference as a candidate for Scotland in the 1999 European Parliament elections. He was placed fourth on the SNP's list and with the SNP only winning two of the eight seats, he was unsuccessful.

He wrote three books that were published between 2009 and 2014 which detailed aspects of his political life.

Wilson continued to have a modest presence in Scottish politics after his retirement. He was active in the Scottish independence referendum campaign. In November 2012, he and Sillars suggested that Scotland should consider joining the European Free Trade Association as an alternative to remaining in the EU, and voted Leave in the 2016 United Kingdom European Union membership referendum. Together with Sillars he then established think-tank Options for Scotland, publishing articles and papers.

== Personal life ==
Wilson married Edith (née Hassall) in 1965 and they had two daughters and five grandchildren.

Wilson was a devout Christian. Later in life, he was a member of Saint Peter's Free Church in Dundee. In 2010, Wilson and David Robertson co-founded Solas (Centre for Public Christianity) - an evangelical Christian body dedicated to the revival of the faith in Scotland and abroad.

He had retired to Broughty Ferry, Dundee and sailed his boat Saorsa on the Firth of Tay.

Wilson died from a pulmonary embolism at the Roxburghe House hospice in Dundee on the morning of 25 June 2017, at the age of 79. His funeral was held at Saint Peter's Free Church in Dundee on 5 July 2017. His party colleague John Swinney and David Robertson gave eulogies.

== Awards and honours ==
He was awarded an honorary Doctor of Laws (LL.D) degree by the University of Dundee in 1986.

Wilson's papers are held variously by the National Library of Scotland, Archive Services at the University of Dundee and the Scottish Political Archive at the University of Stirling. His collection of historical nationalist pamphlets is held by the Macartney Library at SNP headquarters in Edinburgh.

== Publications ==
- SNP: The Turbulent Years 1960-1990, 2009. ISBN 9780951282076
- Pirates of the Air: The Story of Radio Free Scotland, 2011 ISBN 9780951282083
- Scotland: The Battle for Independence, 2014 ISBN 9780957228535

Parliament of the United Kingdom
Preceded by George Machin	Member of Parliament for Dundee East; Feb 1974–1987	Succeeded by John McAllion
Political offices
Preceded by Malcolm Shaw	National Secretary of the Scottish National Party; 1964–1971	Succeeded by Muriel Gibson
Preceded by Douglas Henderson	Senior Vice Chairman (Depute Leader) of the Scottish National Party; 1973–1974	Succeeded by Margo MacDonald
Preceded by William Wolfe	National Convener (Leader) of the Scottish National Party; 1979–1990	Succeeded by Alex Salmond
Academic offices
Preceded by Baron Mackie of Benshie	Rector of the University of Dundee; 1983–1986	Succeeded by Malcolm Bruce
