= Dundee City East =

Region or constituency of the Scottish Parliament

- Burgh constituency for the Scottish Parliament
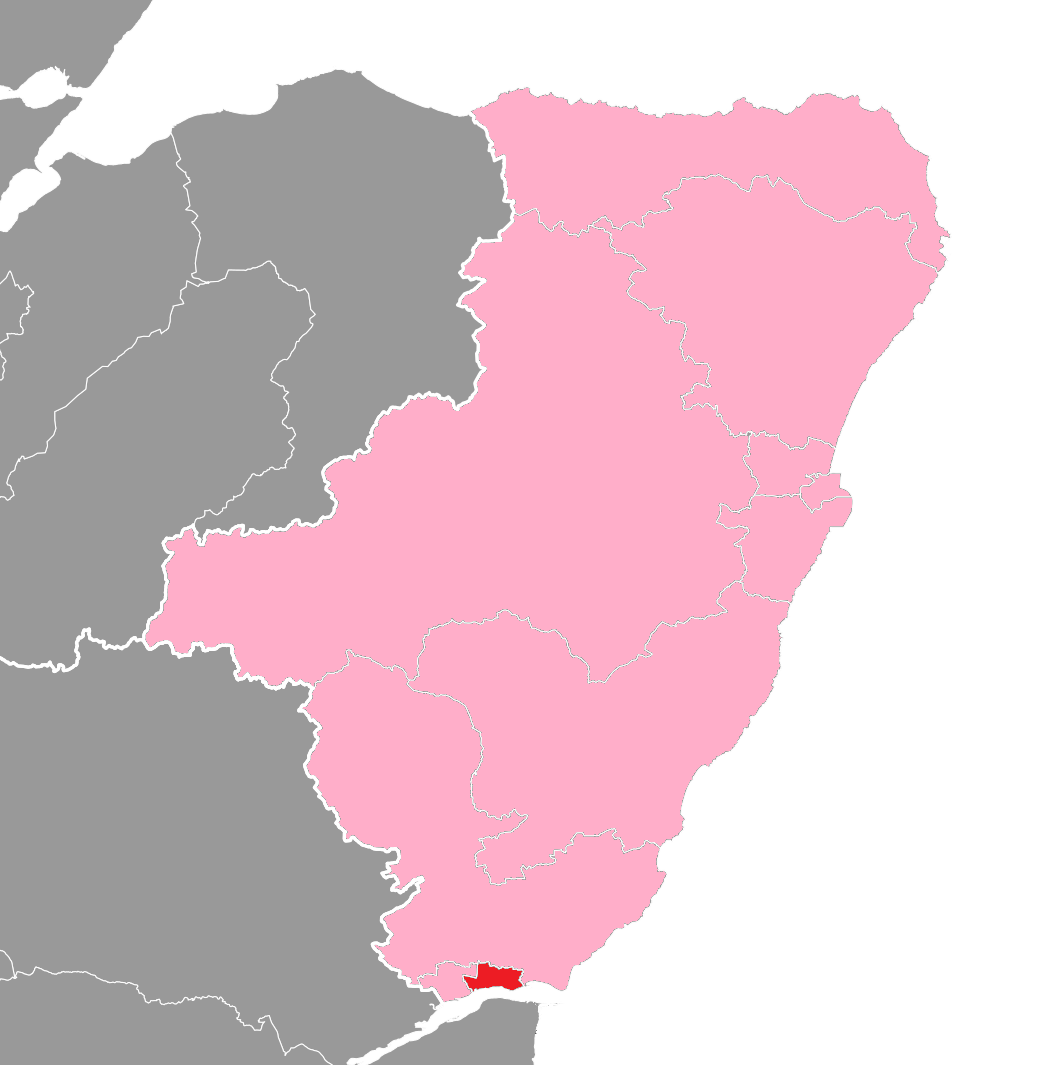

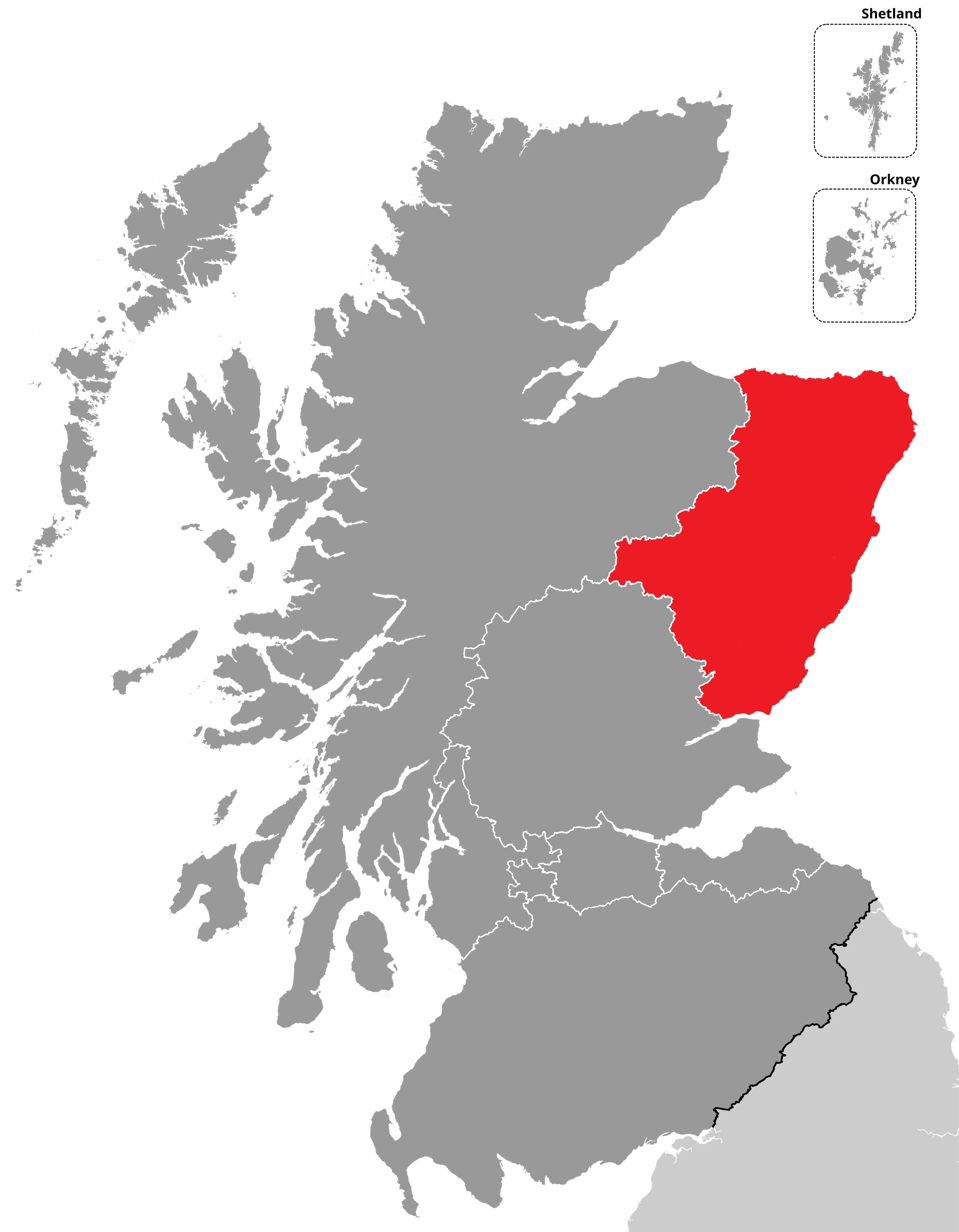
- Dundee City East shown within the North East Scotland electoral region and the region shown within Scotland
- Electoral region: North East Scotland
- Electorate: 57,098 (2026)

Current constituency
- Created: 2011
- Party: Scottish National Party
- MSP: Stephen Gethins
- Council area: Dundee City council area
- Created from: Dundee East

Dundee City East (Gaelic: Baile Dhùn Dè an Ear) is a burgh constituency of the Scottish Parliament covering part of the Dundee City council area. It elects one Member of the Scottish Parliament (MSP) by the first past the post method of election. Under the additional-member electoral system used for elections to the Scottish Parliament, it is also one of ten constituencies in the North East Scotland electoral region, which elects seven additional members, in addition to the ten constituency MSPs, to produce a form of proportional representation for the region as a whole.

The constituency was created for the 2011 Scottish Parliament election, and largely replaced the previous seat of Dundee East. It has been held by Stephen Gethins of the Scottish National Party since the 2026 Scottish Parliament election.

== Electoral region ==
The other nine constituencies of the North East Scotland region are: Aberdeen Central, Aberdeen Donside, Aberdeen Deeside and North Kincardine, Aberdeenshire East, Aberdeenshire West, Angus North and Mearns, Angus South, Banffshire and Buchan Coast and Dundee City West. The region covers all of the Aberdeen City council area, the Aberdeenshire council area, the Angus council area, the Dundee City council area and part of the Moray council area.

== Constituency boundaries and council area ==
Map of boundaries from 2011

The Dundee City council area is represented by two constituencies in the Scottish Parliament: Dundee City East and Dundee City West.

A Dundee East constituency was created at the same time as the Scottish Parliament, for the 1999 Scottish Parliament election, using the name and boundaries of the existing Dundee East constituency of the UK Parliament. Ahead of the 2005 United Kingdom general election the boundaries used for elections to the UK Parliament were subject to some alteration, whilst being retained for elections to the Scottish Parliament. There is now no longer any link between the two sets of constituencies. New Scottish Parliament boundaries were introduced for the 2011 Scottish Parliament election, with Dundee East being renamed Dundee City East, with borders redrawn slightly to exclude the 'Hebrides' neighbourhood at Claverhouse just west of the A90 road and include new housing developments north of the A92 road near Barnhill. The seat was unaffected by the second periodic review of Scottish Parliament boundaries, remaining unchanged for the 2026 Scottish Parliament election. The constituency comprises the following wards of Dundee City Council:

- In full: East End, The Ferry
- In part: Coldside, Maryfield, North East (all shared with Dundee City West)

== Member of the Scottish Parliament ==
Election	Member	Party
2011	Shona Robison	Scottish National Party
2026	Stephen Gethins	Scottish National Party

== Election results ==

=== 2020s ===
2026 Scottish Parliament election: Dundee City East
Party	Candidate	Constituency			Regional		
Party	Candidate	Votes	%	±%	Votes	%	±%
SNP	Stephen Gethins	12,969	48.8	▼10.4	9,342	35.1	▼15.3
Labour Co-op	Cheryl-Ann Cruickshank (Note: Cruickshank stood on a joint ticket on behalf of Scottish Labour and the Scottish Co-operative Party.)	4,792	18.0	▼0.1	4,171	15.7	▼0.3
Reform	Mark Simpson (Note: Elected on the party list)	4,135	15.6	New	4,125	15.5	▲15.3
Green					3,791	14.2	▲7.2
Liberal Democrats	Tanvir Ahmad	2,086	7.9	▲3.5	1,734	6.5	▲3.2
Conservative	Jack Cruickshanks	1,999	7.5	▼9.8	2,139	8.0	▼9.5
TUSC	Donald MacLeod	361	1.4	New			
Independent Green Voice					306	1.2	▲0.4
ISP					230	0.9	New
Scottish Family					211	0.8	▲0.2
AtLS					210	0.8	New
Workers Party	Peter Ashby	209	0.8	New	107	0.4	New
Scottish Socialist					122	0.5	New
Independent	Marie Boulton				53	0.2	New
Advance UK					44	0.2	New
Independent	Iris Leask				20	0.1	New
Majority		8,177	30.8	▼10.3			
Valid votes		26,551			26,605		
Invalid votes		138			109		
Turnout		26,689	46.7	▼11.9	26,714	46.8	▼11.8
SNP hold		Swing					
Notes

2021 Scottish Parliament election: Dundee City East
Party	Candidate	Constituency			Regional		
Party	Candidate	Votes	%	±%	Votes	%	±%
SNP	Shona Robison (Note: Incumbent member for this constituency)	19,230	59.2	▲1.1	16,403	50.4	▼2.8
Labour	Owen Wright	5,893	18.1	▼1.6	5,201	16.0	▼1.9
Conservative	Philip Scott	5,630	17.3	▼0.2	5,699	17.5	▼0.4
Green					2,267	7.0	▲1.8
Liberal Democrats	Michael Crichton	1,431	4.4	▲1.2	1,067	3.3	▲0.8
Alba					810	2.5	New
TUSC	Wayne Scott	287	0.9	▼0.6			
All for Unity					261	0.8	New
Independent Green Voice					246	0.8	New
Scottish Family					193	0.6	New
Freedom Alliance (UK)					83	0.3	New
Abolish the Scottish Parliament					81	0.2	New
Reform					63	0.2	New
Scottish Libertarian					49	0.2	▲0.1
UKIP					44	0.1	▼1.6
Restore Scotland					36	0.1	New
Independent	Laura Marshall				29	0.1	New
Independent	Geoffrey Farquharson				15	0.0	New
Renew					5	0.0	New
Majority		13,337	41.1	▲2.8			
Valid votes		32,471			32,552		
Invalid votes		155			62		
Turnout		32,626	58.6	▲6.9	32,614	58.6	▲6.9
SNP hold		Swing					

=== 2010s ===
2016 Scottish Parliament election: Dundee City East
Party	Candidate	Constituency			Regional		
Party	Candidate	Votes	%	±%	Votes	%	±%
SNP	Shona Robison (Note: Incumbent member for this constituency)	16,509	58.1	▼6.1	15,159	53.2	▼3.2
Labour	Richard McCready	5,611	19.7	▼3.1	5,109	17.9	▼4.2
Conservative	Bill Bowman	4,969	17.5	▲7.6	5,095	17.9	▲7.5
Green					1,475	5.2	▲2.2
Liberal Democrats	Craig Duncan	911	3.2	▲0.1	691	2.5	▲0.2
UKIP					471	1.7	▲1.0
TUSC	Leah Ganley	437	1.5	New			
Solidarity					152	0.5	▲0.3
Scottish Christian					137	0.5	▼0.2
RISE					77	0.3	New
National Front					64	0.2	▲0.2
Communist					50	0.2	New
Scottish Libertarian					23	0.1	New
Majority		10,898	38.4	▼3.0			
Valid votes		28,437			28,503		
Invalid votes		108			63		
Turnout		28,545	51.7	▲4.1	28,566	51.7	▲4.5
SNP hold		Swing		▼4.6			
Notes

2011 Scottish Parliament election: Dundee City East
Party	Candidate	Constituency			Region		
Party	Candidate	Votes	%	±%	Votes	%	±%
SNP	Shona Robison (Note: Incumbent member for the Dundee East constituency)	16,541	64.2	N/A	14,418	56.4	N/A
Labour	Mohammed Asif	5,862	22.8	N/A	5,643	22.1	N/A
Conservative	Brian Docherty	2,550	9.9	N/A	2,664	10.4	N/A
Green					763	3.0	N/A
Liberal Democrats	Allan Petrie	800	3.1	N/A	593	2.3	N/A
All-Scotland Pensioners Party					524	2.0	N/A
BNP					207	0.8	N/A
UKIP					191	0.7	N/A
Scottish Christian					179	0.7	N/A
Socialist Labour					153	0.6	N/A
Scottish Socialist					127	0.5	N/A
Solidarity					54	0.2	N/A
Angus Independents					8	0.0	N/A
National Front					1	0.0	N/A
Others					57	0.2	N/A
Majority		10,679	41.4	N/A			
Valid votes		25,753			25,582		
Invalid votes		139			118		
Turnout		25,892	47.6	N/A	25,700	47.2	N/A
SNP win (new seat)							

== See also ==
- Politics of Dundee

== See also ==
- Dundee East (UK Parliament constituency)
