= John McAllion =

British politician (born 1948)

Member of the Scottish Parliament for Dundee East
- In office 6 May 1999 – 1 May 2003
- Preceded by: Parliament established
- Succeeded by: Shona Robison

Member of Parliament for Dundee East
- In office 11 June 1987 – 14 May 2001
- Preceded by: Gordon Wilson
- Succeeded by: Iain Luke

Personal details
- Born: 13 February 1948 (age 78) Glasgow, Scotland
- Party: Scottish Socialist (since 2006)
- Other political affiliations: Scottish Labour (1970s); Labour (1982–2006)

John McAllion (born 13 February 1948) is a campaigner for the Scottish Socialist Party, as well as a former Labour Party Member of Parliament (MP), Member of the Scottish Parliament (MSP), and convenor of Tayside Regional Council. He is also convener of the Scottish Fairtrade Forum.

== Early life ==
McAllion was born in Glasgow, where he was educated at St Augustine's RC Comprehensive School in Milton. Following a brief period spent working as a clerical employee for the Post Office, he was admitted to the University of St Andrews to study modern and medieval history, graduating with a second-class honours degree in 1972. After a further year at Dundee College of Education, he was then employed by the city's education department to teach history at St Saviour's RC High School (1973–78) and social studies at Balgowan School (1978–82).

== Political history ==
McAllion was originally a member of the Scottish Labour Party (SLP) that was formed in 1976 by Jim Sillars; when the SLP collapsed, he chose to join the Labour Party (unlike Sillars, who joined the Scottish National Party). In 1982 he was recruited by the Glasgow Labour MP Bob McTaggart as a research assistant. Two years later, he was elected to Tayside Regional Council, becoming the council's convenor in 1986. At the 1987 general election McAllion was elected as the Labour MP for Dundee East, defeating SNP leader Gordon Wilson, who had been the sitting MP since February 1974.

McAllion was a member of Scottish Labour Action, putting him on the Scottish nationalist wing of the Labour Party, and of the Campaign for Socialism, placing him firmly on the left of the party. As befitted a member of the Scottish Labour Action group he strongly favoured home rule for Scotland, and was often outspoken in his defence of civic-minded Scottish nationalism. In 1999 he was elected to the Scottish Parliament to represent Dundee East.

As an MSP, he furthered his reputation as a left-winger, rebelling several times against the Labour-led Scottish Executive. He was also convenor of the Scottish Parliament's Petitions Committee. In 2000 he helped establish the Scottish Left Review publication. At the 2003 parliament election he lost his seat to Shona Robison, the SNP candidate. The Scottish Socialist Party (SSP) pulled out of contesting the seat in favour of McAllion, but ironically this may have assisted his defeat.

After the election defeat, McAllion resigned his membership of the Labour Party, subsequently joining the Scottish Socialist Party. On 9 February 2006, McAllion stood for the SSP in the Dunfermline and West Fife by-election, coming fifth of nine candidates with 1.6% of the vote.

He was elected to the SSP executive at its conference in March 2006. He was elected co-chair (along with Morag Balfour) at its conference in October 2007, but he stood down during his term of office for personal reasons. However, he has remained active in campaigning with the party, particularly in the run-up to the independence referendum.

Parliament of the United Kingdom
Preceded by Gordon Wilson	Member of Parliament for Dundee East; 1987–2001	Succeeded by Iain Luke
Scottish Parliament
New constituency	Member of the Scottish Parliament for Dundee East; 1999–2003	Succeeded by Shona Robison
