= Thomas Cook (Scottish politician) =

Scottish Labour Party politician (1908–1952)

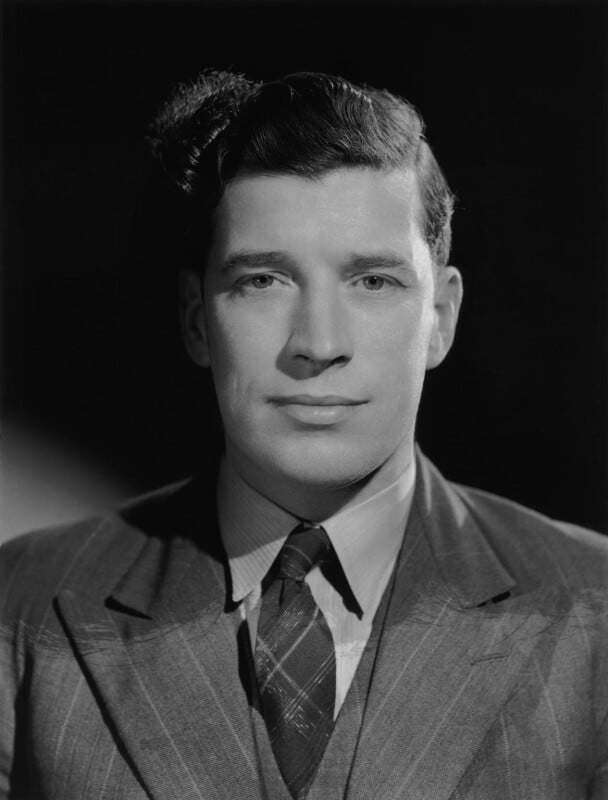
- Cook in 1947

Member of Parliament for Dundee East
- In office 23 February 1950 – 31 May 1952
- Preceded by: Constituency established
- Succeeded by: George Thomson

Personal details
- Born: Thomas Fotheringham Cook; 7 June 1908 Larkhall, Scotland
- Died: 31 May 1952 (aged 43) Arbroath, Scotland
- Party: Scottish Labour
- Children: 2

Thomas Fotheringham Cook (7 June 1908 – 31 May 1952) was a Scottish Labour Party politician.

== Biography ==
Cook was the son of a miner and was born in Larkhall. He was interested in politics from the time he was an apprentice electrician, and was active in the co-operative movement in Rutherglen.

Cook was active in the Independent Labour Party until the early 1930s, when he joined the Scottish Socialist Party split. This affiliated to the Labour Party, under which label Cook served as Member of Parliament for constituencies in Dundee from 1945 until his death in 1952. He was first elected for the two member constituency of Dundee at the 1945 general election, being elected at the head of the poll. When that seat was abolished for the 1950 election he was elected as the first member for the new seat of Dundee East. In parliament he served as Parliamentary Private Secretary to the President of the Board of Trade, working under Stafford Cripps and Harold Wilson, and then from 1950 to 1951 Under-Secretary of State for the Colonies.The Glasgow Herald described him "as one of the most popular Labour men in the House".

Cook died as a result of a road traffic accident a few minutes before midnight on 31 May 1952. He was driving on the Arbroath to Dundee road when the car he was driving left the road and collided with a tree and went over a low wall in to a field resulting in his instant death due to crush injuries to his chest. The owner of the car, a local businessman named John Ross, was also in the vehicle and was taken to Dundee Royal Infirmary to be treated for arm injuries. Cook's wife had died the previous December and he was survived by a son and a daughter.

Parliament of the United Kingdom
Preceded by Dingle Foot and Florence Horsbrugh	Member of Parliament for Dundee; 1945–1950; With: John Strachey	Constituency divided
New constituency	Member of Parliament for Dundee East; 1950–1952	Succeeded by George Thomson
Political offices
Preceded by David Rees-Williams	Under-Secretary of State for the Colonies; 1950–1951	Succeeded by The Earl of Munster
