= George Machin =

British politician (1922–1989)

Member of Parliament for Dundee East
- In office 1 March 1973 – 8 February 1974
- Preceded by: George Thomson
- Succeeded by: Gordon Wilson

Personal details
- Born: 30 December 1922 Sheffield, England
- Died: 5 December 1989 (aged 66)
- Party: Labour

George Machin (30 December 1922 – 5 December 1989) was a British Labour Party politician, engineering inspector and shop steward.

== Biography ==
Machin was a native of Sheffield and attended the city's Marlcliffe School. During World War II, he served in the RAF. After the war ended, he became an engineering inspector and active in the trade union movement. In 1967, he was elected to Sheffield City Council.

At a by-election in March 1973, he was elected as the Member of Parliament for Dundee East, holding off a strong challenge from Gordon Wilson of the Scottish National Party, with Labour winning by 1,141 votes. The contest had been seen as three-way fight between Machin, Wilson and Lord Provost of Dundee, William Fitzgerald, standing as Conservative. On the day of the election, it was speculated in The Glasgow Herald that the Labour vote may be hurt by the fact that Machin was an English candidate in a Scottish seat and because some local Labour supporters were angered as they felt Machin's trade union had used influence to "buy" his nomination. Signs that his English background was an issue were demonstrated during Machin's victory speech which was reportedly disrupted by 'angry shouts of Scottish nationalist supporters', while police flanked him as he faced 'chants of "Go back to Yorkshire" and "Go home, Englishman"'.

At the February 1974 general election, Wilson gained the seat from Labour by 2,966 votes, thus ending Machin's short tenure as an MP of just 11 months. Machin attempted unsuccessfully to regain the seat at the subsequent October 1974 general election, but then retired from politics afterwards.

== See also ==
- List of United Kingdom MPs with the shortest service

Parliament of the United Kingdom
Preceded by George Thomson	Member of Parliament for Dundee East; 1973–Feb 1974	Succeeded by Gordon Wilson
