= George Thomson, Baron Thomson of Monifieth =

British politician (1921–2008)

The Right Honourable The Lord Thomson of Monifieth KT PC DL FRSE
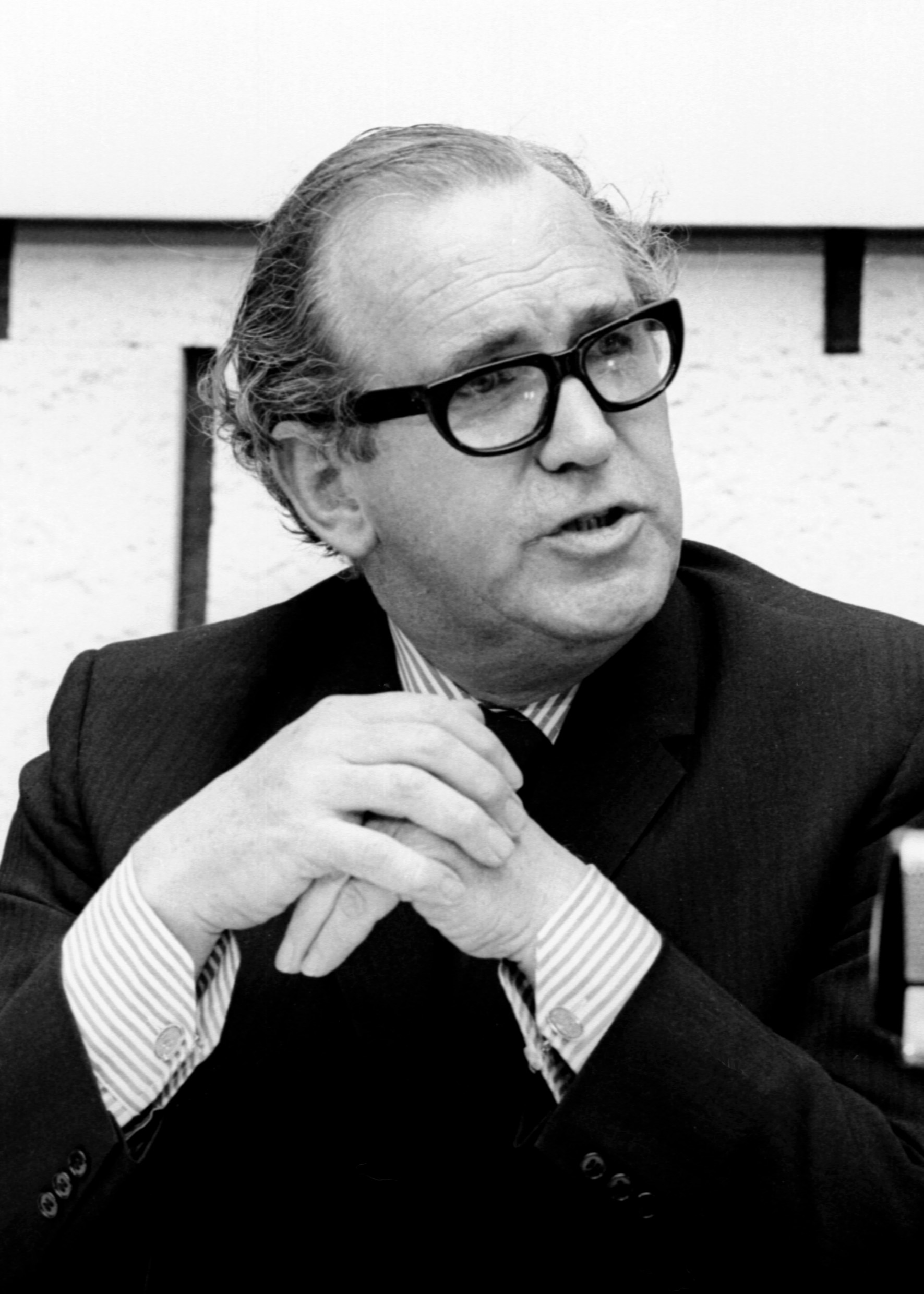
- Thomson in 1973

European Commissioner for Regional Policy
- In office 6 January 1973 – 5 January 1977
- President: François-Xavier Ortoli
- Preceded by: Albert Borschette
- Succeeded by: Antonio Giolitti

Shadow Secretary of State for Defence
- In office 8 July 1970 – 10 April 1972
- Leader: Harold Wilson
- Preceded by: Geoffrey Rippon
- Succeeded by: Fred Peart

Chancellor of the Duchy of Lancaster
- In office 6 October 1969 – 20 June 1970
- Prime Minister: Harold Wilson
- Preceded by: Frederick Lee
- Succeeded by: Anthony Barber
- In office 6 April 1966 – 7 January 1967
- Prime Minister: Harold Wilson
- Preceded by: Douglas Houghton
- Succeeded by: Frederick Lee

Minister without Portfolio
- In office 17 October 1968 – 6 October 1969
- Prime Minister: Harold Wilson
- Preceded by: Patrick Gordon-Walker
- Succeeded by: The Lord Drumalbyn

Secretary of State for Commonwealth Affairs
- In office 29 August 1967 – 17 October 1968
- Prime Minister: Harold Wilson
- Preceded by: Herbert Bowden
- Succeeded by: Michael Stewart (foreign and Commonwealth affairs)

Member of the House of Lords
- Lord Temporal
- Life peerage 23 March 1977 – 3 October 2008

Member of Parliament for Dundee East
- In office 17 July 1952 – 29 December 1972
- Preceded by: Thomas Cook
- Succeeded by: George Machin

Personal details
- Born: 16 January 1921 Penn, Buckinghamshire, England
- Died: 3 October 2008 (aged 87) London, England
- Party: Labour (before 1981); SDP (1981–1988); Liberal Democrats (from 1988)
- Spouse: Grace Jenkins (m. 1948)
- Children: 2, including Caroline

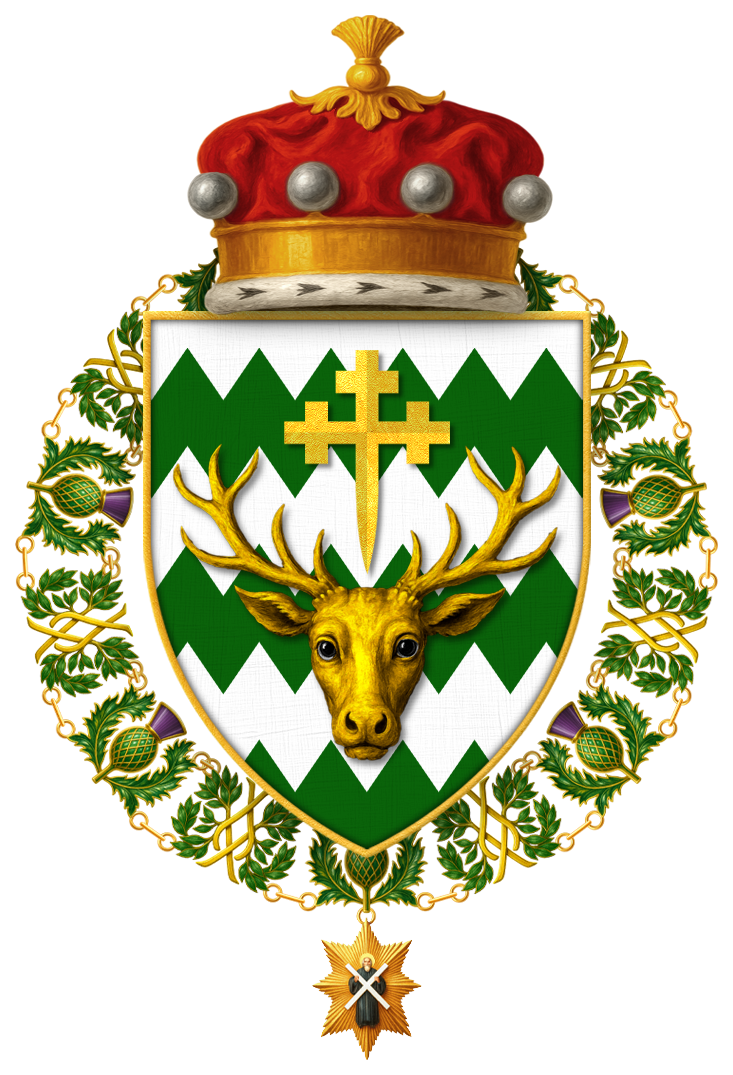
Shield of Arms of George Morgan Thomson, Baron Thomson of Monifieth, KT, PC, DL, FRSE

George Morgan Thomson, Baron Thomson of Monifieth, KT, PC, DL, FRSE (16 January 1921 – 3 October 2008) was a British politician and journalist who served as a Labour MP. He was a member of Harold Wilson's cabinet, and later became a European Commissioner.

In the 1980s, he joined the Social Democratic Party. Following the SDP's merger with the Liberal Party, he became a Liberal Democrat and sat as a Liberal Democrat member of the House of Lords.

== Early life ==
Thomson was educated at Grove Academy, Broughty Ferry, Dundee. At 16 he left school to become a local reporter with the Dundee newspaper, magazine and comic publishers DC Thomson. He became deputy editor of the firms' successful comic The Dandy and for a short time was its editor, despite being only 18 years old. He left the firm in 1940 to serve in the Royal Air Force. Due to eyesight problems he was not able to take a flight crew role and served on the ground for fighter command. He returned to DC Thomson in 1946, but left the firm after clashing with them over his right to join a trade union. He then became assistant editor, and later editor, of Forward, a Scottish-based socialist newspaper, from 1946 to 1953.

== Political career ==
At the 1950 and 1951 general elections, Thomson stood unsuccessfully in Glasgow Hillhead. In 1952, he was elected Member of Parliament in a by-election for Dundee East, where he served until his resignation in 1972. He served in the Wilson government as Minister of State, Foreign Office, from October 1964 to April 1966, then as Chancellor of the Duchy of Lancaster from 1966 to 1967, and again from 1969 to 1970, Secretary of State for Commonwealth Affairs from 1967 to 1968, and Minister without Portfolio from 1968 to 1969. During his time as Commonwealth Secretary he had responsibility for trying to reach a settlement of the Southern Rhodesia (now Zimbabwe) question and for implementing sanctions against the regime there. He was one of the first British Commissioners of the European Community (EC) from 1973 to 1977, with responsibility for regional policy. As chairman of the Independent Broadcasting Authority (IBA) from 1981 to 1988 he oversaw the introduction of Channel 4 and TV-am.

He was Chair of the Advertising Standards Authority from 1977 to 1980; Chair of the IBA 1981–88; a European Commissioner, with responsibility for Regional Policy 1973–76; First Crown Estate Commissioner from 1977 to 1980; and a Member of the Committee on Standards in Public Life from 1994 until 1997. He was Deputy Chair of the Woolwich Building Society from 1988 to 1991. He had been a Lords' Member of the Parliamentary Broadcasting Unit since 1993. He was a Fellow of the Royal Society of Edinburgh and the Royal Television Society, and a patron of Sustrans.

In 1985 he was invited to deliver the MacMillan Memorial Lecture to the Institution of Engineers and Shipbuilders in Scotland; he chose "Does Public Broadcasting Have a Future? The Challenge of the New Technologies". After moving with his wife, Grace, to Charing, Kent, Thomson held the position of Party President, for Ashford Liberal Democrats, from 1999 to 2006.

== Death ==
He died on Friday 3 October 2008 at London's St Thomas' Hospital, from a viral infection. He was survived by his wife, Grace (née Jenkins), Lady Thomson (1925–2014), and their two daughters, Ailsa and Caroline, the former chief operating officer of the BBC.

== Honours ==
Thomson received an honorary doctorate from Heriot-Watt University in 1973.

Thomson was made a Privy Counsellor in 1966, was created a Life Peer on 23 March 1977 as Baron Thomson of Monifieth, of Monifieth in the District of the City of Dundee, and became a Knight of the Thistle in 1981.

Media offices
| Preceded by Emrys Hughes | Editor of Forward; 1948–1953 | Position abolished |
| Preceded by Lady Plowden | Chairman of the Independent Broadcasting Authority; 1981–1988 | Succeeded by George Russell |
Parliament of the United Kingdom
| Preceded by Thomas Cook | Member of Parliament for Dundee East; 1952–1972 | Succeeded by George Machin |
Political offices
| Preceded by Douglas Houghton | Chancellor of the Duchy of Lancaster; 1966–1967 | Succeeded by Frederick Lee |
| Preceded by Herbert Bowden | Secretary of State for Commonwealth Affairs; 1967–1968 | Succeeded by Michael Stewart as Secretary of State for Foreign and Commonwealth Affairs |
| Preceded by Patrick Gordon-Walker | Minister without Portfolio; 1968–1969 | Succeeded by The Lord Drumalbyn |
| Preceded by Frederick Lee | Chancellor of the Duchy of Lancaster; 1969–1970 | Succeeded by Anthony Barber |
| Preceded by Geoffrey Rippon | Shadow Secretary of State for Defence; 1970–1972 | Succeeded by Fred Peart |
| New office | British European Commissioner; 1973–1977; Served alongside: Christopher Soames | Succeeded by Roy Jenkins; Christopher Tugendhat |
| Preceded by Albert Borschette | European Commissioner for Regional Policy; 1973–1977 | Succeeded by Antonio Giolitti |
