= Dundee East (Scottish Parliament constituency) =

Region or constituency of the Scottish Parliament

- Former burgh constituency for the Scottish Parliament
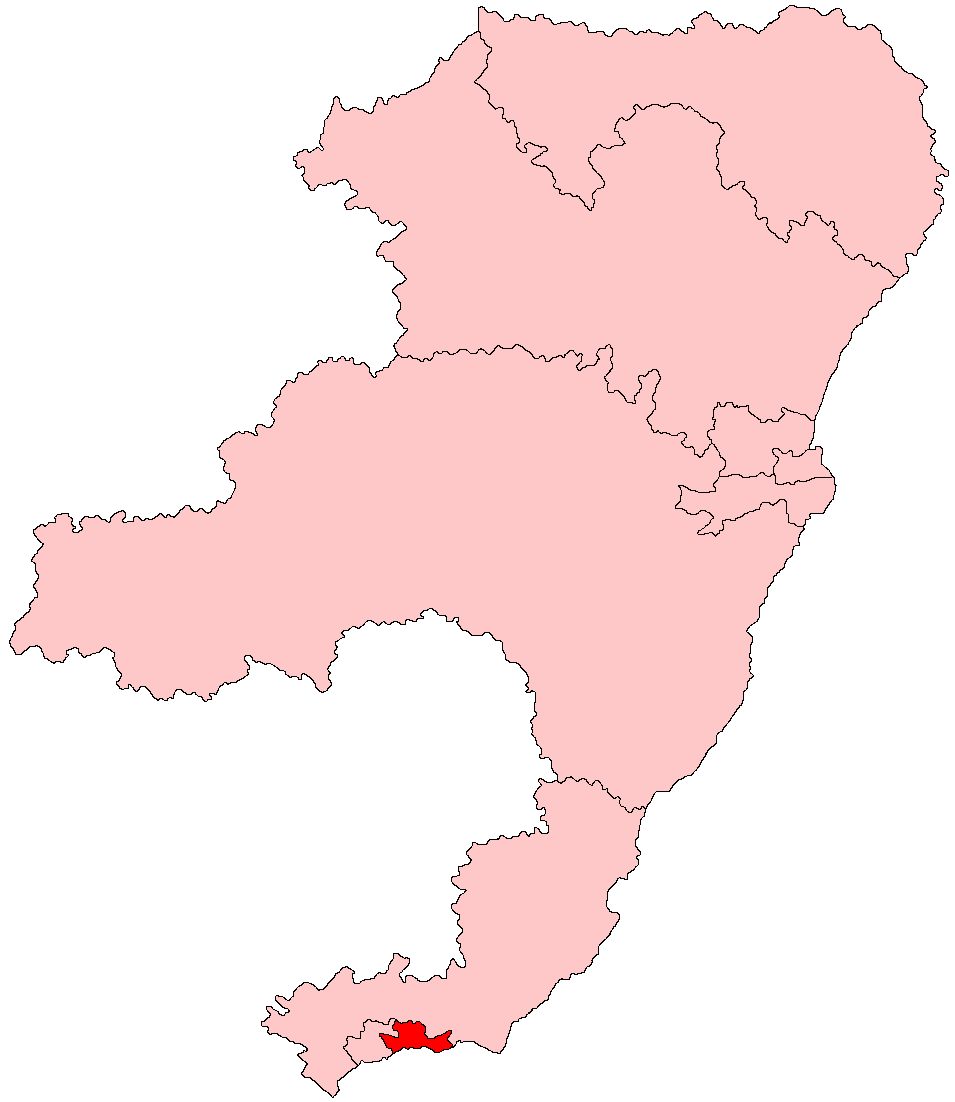

- Dundee East shown within the North East Scotland electoral region and the region shown within Scotland

Former constituency
- Created: 1999
- Abolished: 2011
- Council area: Dundee City (part)
- Replaced by: Dundee City East

Dundee East was a constituency of the Scottish Parliament (Holyrood). It elected one Member of the Scottish Parliament (MSP) by the first past the post method of election. Also, however, it was one of nine constituencies in the North East Scotland electoral region, which elects seven additional members, in addition to nine constituency MSPs, to produce a form of proportional representation for the region as a whole.

From the Scottish Parliament election, 2011, Dundee East was redrawn and renamed Dundee City East.

== Electoral region ==
From 1999 to 2011, the other nine constituencies of the North East Scotland region were: Aberdeen Central, Aberdeen North, Aberdeen South, Angus, Banff and Buchan, Dundee West, Gordon and West Aberdeenshire and Kincardine.

The region covered Aberdeenshire, Aberdeen City, Dundee City, part of Angus, a small part of Moray and a small part of Perth and Kinross.

== Constituency boundaries ==
The Dundee East constituency was created at the same time as the Scottish Parliament, in 1999, with the name and boundaries of an existing Westminster constituency. In 2005, however, the boundaries of the Westminster (House of Commons) constituency were subject to some alteration.

From the 2011 election, the redrawn and renamed Dundee City East constituency would consist of the following electoral wards;

- In full: East End, The Ferry;
- In part: Coldside, Maryfield, North East

=== Council area ===
The Holyrood constituency was within the Dundee City council area, which was divided between three North East Scotland constituencies. Dundee East and Dundee West were within the city area. The Angus constituency covered north-eastern and north-western areas of the city, as well as a southern portion of the Angus council area and a small eastern portion of the Perth and Kinross council area.

== Member of the Scottish Parliament ==
| Election | Member | Party |
|---|---|---|
| 1999 | John McAllion | Scottish Labour Party |
| 2003 | Shona Robison | Scottish National Party |
| 2011 | constituency abolished: replaced by Dundee City East | |

== Election results ==
2007 Scottish Parliament election: Dundee East
| Party | Candidate | Votes | % | ±% |
|---|---|---|---|---|
| SNP | Shona Robison | 13,314 | 49.6 | +10.0 |
| Labour | Iain Luke | 8,790 | 32.7 | −6.5 |
| Conservative | Chris Bustin | 2,976 | 11.1 | −0.8 |
| Liberal Democrats | Clive Sneddon | 1,789 | 6.7 | +0.7 |
| Majority | | 4,524 | 16.9 | +16.5 |
| Rejected ballots | | 913 | | |
| Turnout | | 28,698 | 49.9 | +2.8 |
| SNP hold | | Swing | +16.9 | |

2003 Scottish Parliament election: Dundee East
| Party | Candidate | Votes | % | ±% |
|---|---|---|---|---|
| SNP | Shona Robison | 10,428 | 39.6 | +5.3 |
| Labour | John McAllion | 10,338 | 39.2 | −4.1 |
| Conservative | Edward Prince | 3,133 | 11.9 | −2.1 |
| Liberal Democrats | Clive Sneddon | 1,584 | 6.0 | −0.8 |
| Independent | James Gourlay | 865 | 3.3 | New |
| Majority | | 90 | 0.4 | N/A |
| Turnout | | 26,348 | 47.1 | −6.4 |
| SNP gain from Labour | | Swing | | |

1999 Scottish Parliament election: Dundee East
| Party | Candidate | Votes | % | ±% |
|---|---|---|---|---|
| Labour | John McAllion | 13,703 | 43.28 | N/A |
| SNP | Shona Robison | 10,849 | 34.26 | N/A |
| Conservative | Iain Mitchell | 4,428 | 13.98 | N/A |
| Liberal Democrats | Raymond Lawrie | 2,153 | 6.80 | N/A |
| Scottish Socialist | Harvey Duke | 530 | 1.67 | N/A |
| Majority | | 2,854 | 9.02 | N/A |
| Turnout | | 31,663 | 53.50 | N/A |
| Labour win (new seat) | | | | |

== See also ==
- Politics of Dundee
