= 1952 Dundee East by-election =

UK parliamentary by-election

The 1952 Dundee East by-election was held on 17 July 1952, due to the death in a road accident of the incumbent Labour MP, Thomas Cook. It was won by the Labour candidate George Thomson.

== Background ==
Thomas Cook had been an MP for Dundee East since its creation in 1950, having previously represented the old two-member Dundee seat. On 31 May 1952 he was travelling between Arbroath and Dundee when his car left the road, struck a tree and went over a low wall in to a field, killing him instantly. Reporting Cook's death, The Glasgow Herald speculated that Labour should fairly safely hold the seat in the by-election to follow, arguing that while until October 1951 the seat might have been considered marginal, Cook's holding of it against a strong campaign suggested that the seat could now be considered a safe one for Labour. However the newspaper opined that the strength of Labour's majority would give some indication as to the extent of the "alleged unpopularity" of the Conservative Government.

== Candidates ==
Labour selected 31 year old George Morgan Thomson, who was originally from nearby Monifieth and had been educated at Broughty Ferry's Grove Academy. The Dundee Unionist and Liberal National Association selected Paul Cowcher, who had contested Glasgow Maryhill at the previous year's general election. Cowcher had previously served in the Royal Navy. The Scottish National Party's unsuccessful candidate, Donald Stewart, would later be the SNP's first MP elected at a General Election when he won the Western Isles seat at the 1970 general election. An independent candidate, E. G. MacFarlane described himself as the representative of the World Parliament Party and claimed to be the first candidate in world history to offer voters the chance of supporting the creation of an international federation.

On the eve of the poll, both Thomson and the Conservative and National Liberal candidate Paul Cowcher declared themselves confident of victory. Stewart stated he had enjoyed his campaign and believed it would lead to the 'consolidation of nationalist activities' in Dundee. Thomson's final election meeting was held at Dundee's Premierland Boxing Stadium, where he wore boxing gloves and spoke from the ring.

== Result ==
Dundee East by-election, 1952
Party	Candidate	Votes	%	±%
Labour	George Thomson	22,161	56.64	+2.80
National Liberal	Paul Cowcher	14,035	35.87	−10.29
SNP	Donald Stewart	2,931	7.49	New
Independent	E G MacFarlane	290	0.74	New
Majority		8,126	20.77	+13.09
Turnout		39,127		
Labour hold		Swing		

Thomson considered his victory, and the fall in the Conservative vote, represented a vote of no confidence in the Government. Crowcher blamed the fall in the Conservative vote on unemployment in the local textile industry and felt people had yet to realise that 'unpopular measures' taken by the Government were in their best interests. Stewart admitted to being 'a little disappointed' that people who had indicated they supported Scottish nationalism did not all vote for him.

Thomson would hold the seat with a reduced majority of 4,040 votes at the next general election in 1955.
