= Dundee East (UK Parliament constituency) =

Parliamentary constituency in the United Kingdom, 1950-2024

Coordinates: 56°31′20″N 2°50′01″W

- Former burgh constituency for the House of Commons
- Boundary of Dundee East in Scotland
- Subdivision: Angus/Dundee City
- Major settlements: Broughty Ferry, Carnoustie, Monifieth

1950–2024
- Created from: Dundee
- Replaced by: Arbroath and Broughty Ferry

Dundee East was a constituency of the House of Commons of the Parliament of the United Kingdom (at Westminster). Created for the 1950 general election, it elected one Member of Parliament (MP) by the first-past-the-post voting system.

This was one of the safest SNP seats. Since 2005, Stewart Hosie of the Scottish National Party had served as the MP for the constituency. On 14 November 2014, Hosie was elected as Deputy Leader of the Scottish National Party, succeeding Nicola Sturgeon, who was elected as the party leader; Hosie served as Deputy Leader until 13 October 2016.

At the 2023 periodic review of Westminster constituencies, the seat was subject to boundary changes, gaining the town of Arbroath and surrounding areas, partly offset by the loss of parts of East End, Maryfield and Strathmartine from the Dundee City council area which moved to Dundee Central. As a consequence, Dundee East was renamed Arbroath and Broughty Ferry, and was first contested at the 2024 general election.

== Constituency profile ==
Fanning out from the city's docklands, Dundee East took in a series of mixed residential areas as far as the town of Carnoustie and the affluent suburb of Monifieth in the north-east. Prosperous middle-class enclaves such as Barnhill and Broughty Ferry contrasted with older tenement districts and council estates such as Douglas and Whitfield.

== Boundaries ==
Map of boundaries 2005-2024

1950–1974: The County of the City of Dundee wards numbers 1, 4, 5, 10, 11, and 12.

1974–1983: The County of the City of Dundee wards of Broughty Ferry, Caird, Craigie, Douglas, Harbour, and Hilltown. The constituency boundaries remained unchanged.

1983–1997: The City of Dundee District electoral divisions of Balgillo/Eastern, Caird/Midhill, Clepington/Maryfield, Coldside/Hilltown, Craigiebank, Douglas/Drumgeith, Fintry, Welgate/Baxter Park, West Ferry/Broughty Ferry, and Whitfield/Longhaugh.

1997–2005: The City of Dundee District electoral divisions of Barnhill, Broughty Ferry, Clepington, Dens, Douglas and Angus, Fintry, Kingsway East, Stannergate, and Whitfield.

2005–2024: The Dundee City Council wards of Balgillo, Barnhill, Baxter Park, Broughty Ferry, Claverhouse, Craigiebank, Douglas, East Port, Longhaugh, Pitkerro, West Ferry, and Whitfield, and the Angus Council wards of Carnoustie Central, Carnoustie East, Carnoustie West, Monifieth Central, Monifieth West, and Sidlaw East and Ashludie.

The constituency was one of two covering the Dundee City council area, the other being Dundee West. Final boundaries were first used in the 2005 general election.

Prior to the 2005 election, both constituencies were entirely within the city area, and the northeastern and northwestern areas of the city were within the Angus constituency. Scottish Parliament constituencies retain the older boundaries.

== Politics and history of the constituency ==
From the first time it was contested in 1950 through to the 1966 general election, the Dundee East seat returned Labour MPs with comfortable majorities of between 3,805 and 8,126 votes over the second-placed Conservatives. Additionally the Labour candidate always polled more than 50% of the votes cast in these contests. However, in 1970, Labour's majority over the Conservatives fell to 2,798 votes and the Labour share dipped below 50%. The same year saw the Scottish National Party contest the seat in a general election for the first time, though they had previously contested the 1952 by-election.

The constituency had been a marginal seat between the SNP and Labour since the 1973 by-election. Although Labour won the seat in that by-election, the SNP established itself as the clear challenger and continued to advance, winning the seat in the next general election. Labour were thought to have underperformed in not winning the seat back in the 1979 general election, and the choice of the former Communist Jimmy Reid as Labour candidate was blamed for the loss. John McAllion regained the constituency for Labour at the 1987 general election.

Boundary changes which came into force in 2005 brought in many voters from more suburban areas formerly in the Angus constituency. Although estimates of the 2001 general election result on the new boundaries showed Labour ahead, the lead was exceptionally narrow, and after the SNP won the Scottish Parliament seat on the original boundaries in 2003, a close fight was expected (and occurred) in the 2005 general election. The constituency was gained by the SNP's Stewart Hosie, who won the constituency with a 1.0% vote majority ahead of Labour in 2005, which he increased to 4.5% at the 2010 general election.

In 2015, the sitting SNP MP Stewart Hosie retained the seat with a majority of 19,162 votes and a 39.8% share of the vote. This was the largest majority of any of the 56 SNP MPs elected at that year's general election in terms of percentage, although a slightly larger numerical majority was achieved in Falkirk.

In 2017 Hosie's vote share dropped to 42.8% and a revived Conservative Party cut his majority by more than two thirds to 6,645. Labour narrowly slipped into third place. In 2019 Hosie increased his majority to over 13,000 votes as his vote share rose by 11%. In percentage terms, the SNP majority of 29.54%, was the party's second largest at the election, being surpassed only by the 33.87 majority it had in Aberdeen North. The Conservative's remained in second place with a small decrease in vote share, but the Labour vote decreased dramatically as the party recorded its worst ever result in the seat's history.

== Members of Parliament ==
Election	Member	Party
1950	Thomas Cook	Labour
1952 by-election	George Thomson	Labour
1973 by-election	George Machin	Labour
Feb 1974	Gordon Wilson	SNP
1987	John McAllion	Labour
2001	Iain Luke	Labour
2005	Stewart Hosie	SNP
2024	constituency abolished see Arbroath and Broughty Ferry	

== Election results ==
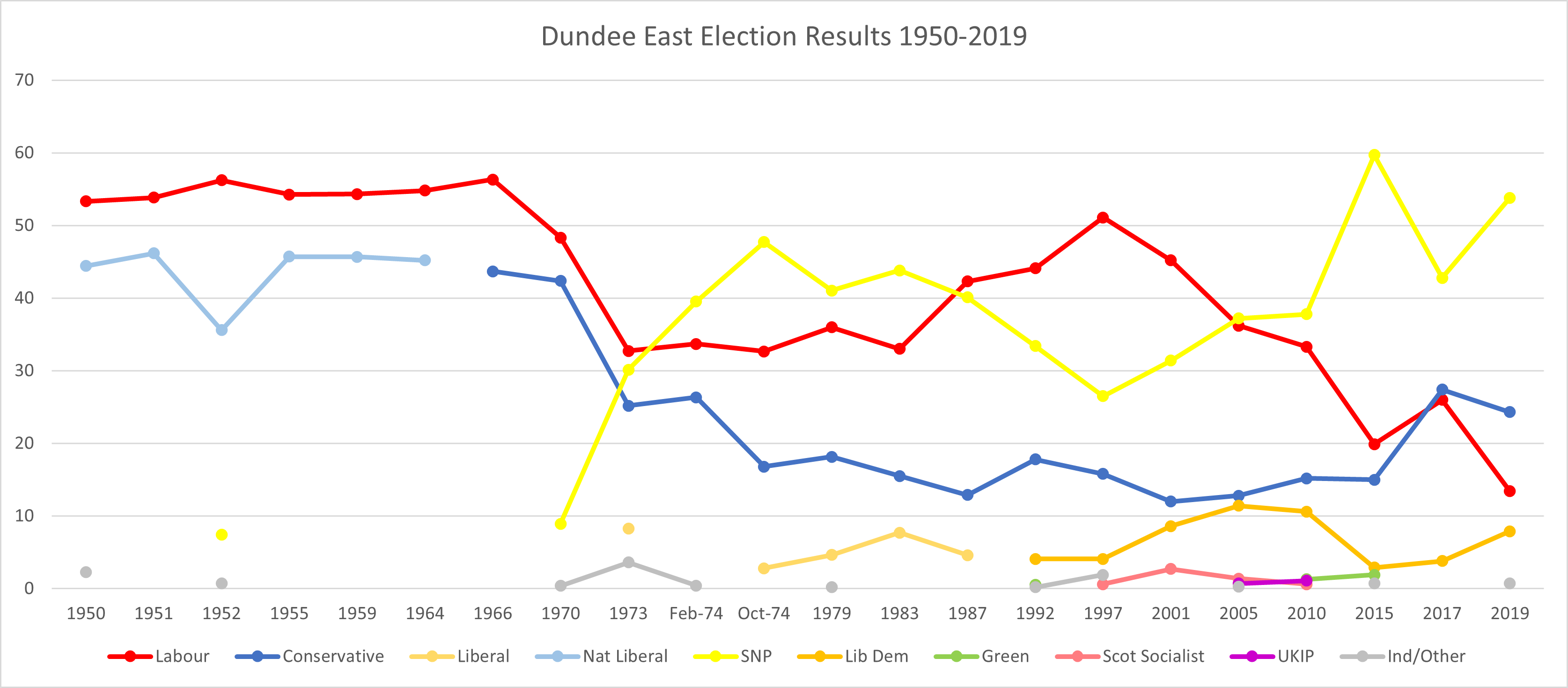
Dundee East Election Results 1950-2019

=== Elections in the 1950s ===
General election 1950: Dundee East
Party	Candidate	Votes	%	±%
Labour	Thomas Cook	26,005	53.34	
National Liberal	James Henderson	21,658	44.42	
Communist	Dave Bowman	1,093	2.24	
Majority		4,347	8.92	
Turnout		48,756	88.60	
Labour win (new seat)				

General election 1951: Dundee East
Party	Candidate	Votes	%	±%
Labour	Thomas Cook	26,668	53.84	+1.51
National Liberal	Janet Sutherland Murray	22,863	46.16	+1.74
Majority		3,805	7.68	−1.24
Turnout		49,531	87.23	−1.37
Labour hold		Swing		

1952 by-election: Dundee East
Party	Candidate	Votes	%	±%
Labour	George Thomson	22,161	56.64	+2.80
National Liberal	Paul Cowcher	14,035	35.87	−10.29
SNP	Donald Stewart	2,931	7.49	New
Independent	E G MacFarlane	290	0.74	New
Majority		8,126	20.77	+13.09
Turnout		39,127		
Labour hold		Swing		

General election 1955: Dundee East
Party	Candidate	Votes	%	±%
Labour	George Thomson	25,646	54.27	
National Liberal	Robert R. Taylor	21,606	45.73	
Majority		4,040	8.56	
Turnout		47,252	82.32	
Labour hold		Swing		

General election 1959: Dundee East
Party	Candidate	Votes	%	±%
Labour	George Thomson	26,263	54.32	
National Liberal	Robert A McCrindle	22,082	45.68	
Majority		4,181	8.64	
Turnout		48,345	82.59	
Labour hold		Swing		

=== Elections in the 1960s ===
General election 1964: Dundee East
Party	Candidate	Votes	%	±%
Labour	George Thomson	26,062	54.80	
National Liberal	John Marshall	21,499	45.20	
Majority		4,563	9.60	+0.96
Turnout		47,561	80.00	−2.59
Labour hold		Swing		

General election 1966: Dundee East
Party	Candidate	Votes	%	±%
Labour	George Thomson	25,530	56.32	
Conservative	John Marshall	19,804	43.68	
Majority		5,726	12.64	+3.04
Turnout		45,334	78.84	−1.16
Labour hold		Swing		

=== Elections in the 1970s ===
General election 1970: Dundee East
Party	Candidate	Votes	%	±%
Labour	George Thomson	22,630	48.34	
Conservative	Allan Stewart	19,832	42.36	
SNP	Ian Macaulay	4,181	8.93	New
World Government Radical	E. G. Macfarlane	176	0.38	New
Majority		2,798	5.98	
Turnout		46,819	75.97	
Labour hold		Swing		

1973 Dundee East by-election
Party	Candidate	Votes	%	±%
Labour	George Machin	14,411	32.74	−15.60
SNP	Gordon Wilson	13,270	30.15	+21.22
Conservative	William Fitzgerald	11,089	25.19	−17.17
Liberal	Nathaniel Gordon	3,653	8.30	New
Labour Party of Scotland	George MacLean	1,409	3.20	New
Independent	John S Thomson	182	0.41	New
Majority		1,141	2.59	−3.39
Turnout		44,014		
Labour hold		Swing		

General election February 1974: Dundee East
Party	Candidate	Votes	%	±%
SNP	Gordon Wilson	20,066	39.53	+31.60
Labour	George Machin	17,100	33.69	−15.65
Conservative	James George Clyde	13,371	26.34	−15.98
Christian Democratic Socialist	James Gourlay	220	0.43	New
Majority		2,966	5.84	N/A
Turnout		50,757	81.09	+5.12
SNP gain from Labour		Swing		

General election October 1974: Dundee East
Party	Candidate	Votes	%	±%
SNP	Gordon Wilson	22,120	47.73	+8.20
Labour	George Machin	15,137	32.66	−1.03
Conservative	Bill Walker	7,784	16.80	−9.54
Liberal	Chic Brodie	1,302	2.81	New
Majority		6,983	15.07	+9.2
Turnout		46,343	73.41	−7.68
SNP hold		Swing		

General election 1979: Dundee East
Party	Candidate	Votes	%	±%
SNP	Gordon Wilson	20,497	41.03	−6.60
Labour	Jimmy Reid	17,978	35.99	+3.33
Conservative	Brian James Taggart Townsend	9,072	18.16	+1.36
Liberal	Chic Brodie	2,317	4.64	+1.83
Workers Revolutionary	Roy Battersby	95	0.19	New
Majority		2,519	5.04	−10.03
Turnout		49,959	77.70	+4.29
SNP hold		Swing		

=== Elections in the 1980s ===
General election 1983: Dundee East
Party	Candidate	Votes	%	±%
SNP	Gordon Wilson	20,276	43.8	+2.8
Labour	Charles Bowman	15,260	33.0	−3.4
Conservative	Barbara Vaughan	7,712	15.5	−2.3
Liberal	Stephen Rottger	3,546	7.7	+3.1
Majority		5,016	10.8	+5.8
Turnout		46,794	73.7	−4.0
SNP hold		Swing		

General election 1987: Dundee East
Party	Candidate	Votes	%	±%
Labour	John McAllion	19,539	42.3	+9.3
SNP	Gordon Wilson	18,524	40.1	−3.7
Conservative	Paul Cook	5,938	12.9	−2.6
Liberal	Margo von Romberg	2,143	4.6	−3.1
Majority		1,015	2.2	N/A
Turnout		46,144	75.9	+2.2
Labour gain from SNP		Swing		

=== Elections in the 1990s ===
General election 1992: Dundee East
Party	Candidate	Votes	%	±%
Labour	John McAllion	18,761	44.1	+1.8
SNP	David Coutts	14,197	33.4	−6.7
Conservative	Steve Blackwood	7,549	17.8	+4.9
Liberal Democrats	Ian Yuill	1,725	4.1	−0.5
Green	Shiona Baird	205	0.5	New
Natural Law	Ronald Baxter	77	0.2	New
Majority		4,564	10.7	+8.5
Turnout		42,514	72.1	−3.8
Labour hold		Swing		

General election 1997: Dundee East
Party	Candidate	Votes	%	±%
Labour	John McAllion	20,718	51.1	+7.0
SNP	Shona Robison	10,757	26.5	−6.9
Conservative	Bruce Mackie	6,397	15.8	−2.0
Liberal Democrats	Gurudeo Saluja	1,677	4.1	0.0
Referendum	Edward Galloway	601	1.5	New
Scottish Socialist	Harvey Duke	232	0.6	New
Natural Law	Elisabeth Mackenzie	146	0.4	+0.2
Majority		9,961	24.6	+13.9
Turnout		40,528	69.3	−2.8
Labour hold		Swing		

=== Elections in the 2000s ===
General election 2001: Dundee East
Party	Candidate	Votes	%	±%
Labour	Iain Luke	14,635	45.2	−5.9
SNP	Stewart Hosie	10,169	31.4	+4.9
Conservative	Alan Donnelly	3,900	12.0	−3.8
Liberal Democrats	Raymond Lawrie	2,784	8.6	+4.5
Scottish Socialist	Harvey Duke	879	2.7	+2.1
Majority		4,466	13.8	−8.8
Turnout		32,367	57.3	−12.0
Labour hold		Swing		

General election 2005: Dundee East
Party	Candidate	Votes	%	±%
SNP	Stewart Hosie	14,708	37.2	+1.1
Labour	Iain Luke	14,325	36.2	−1.2
Conservative	Chris Bustin	5,061	12.8	−2.5
Liberal Democrats	Clive Sneddon	4,498	11.4	+2.7
Scottish Socialist	Harvey Duke	537	1.4	−1.2
UKIP	Donald Low	292	0.7	New
Independent	David Allison	119	0.3	New
Majority		383	1.0	N/A
Turnout		39,540	62.4	+3.3
SNP gain from Labour		Swing	+1.1	

=== Elections in the 2010s ===
General election 2010: Dundee East
Party	Candidate	Votes	%	±%
SNP	Stewart Hosie	15,350	37.8	+0.6
Labour	Katrina Murray	13,529	33.3	−2.9
Conservative	Chris Bustin	6,177	15.2	+2.4
Liberal Democrats	Clive Sneddon	4,285	10.6	−0.8
Green	Shiona Baird	542	1.3	New
UKIP	Mike Arthur	431	1.1	+0.4
Scottish Socialist	Angela Gorrie	254	0.6	−0.8
Majority		1,821	4.5	+3.5
Turnout		40,568	62.0	−2.4
SNP hold		Swing	+1.7	

General election 2015: Dundee East
Party	Candidate	Votes	%	±%
SNP	Stewart Hosie	28,765	59.7	+21.9
Labour	Lesley Brennan	9,603	19.9	−13.4
Conservative	Bill Bowman	7,206	15.0	−0.2
Liberal Democrats	Craig Duncan	1,387	2.9	−7.7
Green	Helen Grayshan	895	1.9	+0.6
CISTA	Lesley Parker-Hamilton	225	0.5	New
TUSC	Carlo Morelli	104	0.2	New
Majority		19,162	39.8	+34.3
Turnout		48,185	71.0	+9.0
SNP hold		Swing	+17.7	

General election 2017: Dundee East
Party	Candidate	Votes	%	±%
SNP	Stewart Hosie	18,391	42.8	−16.9
Conservative	Eleanor Price	11,746	27.4	+12.4
Labour	Lesley Brennan	11,176	26.0	+6.1
Liberal Democrats	Chris McIntyre	1,615	3.8	+0.9
Majority		6,645	15.4	−24.4
Turnout		42,928	65.2	−5.8
SNP hold		Swing	−14.7	

General election 2019: Dundee East
Party	Candidate	Votes	%	±%
SNP	Stewart Hosie	24,361	53.8	+11.0
Conservative	Philip Scott	10,986	24.3	−3.1
Labour	Rosalind Garton	6,045	13.4	−14.6
Liberal Democrats	Michael Crichton	3,573	7.9	+4.1
Independent	George Morton	312	0.7	New
Majority		13,375	29.5	+14.1
Turnout		45,277	68.4	+3.2
SNP hold		Swing	+7.1	
