= Shona Robison =

Scottish politician (born 1966)

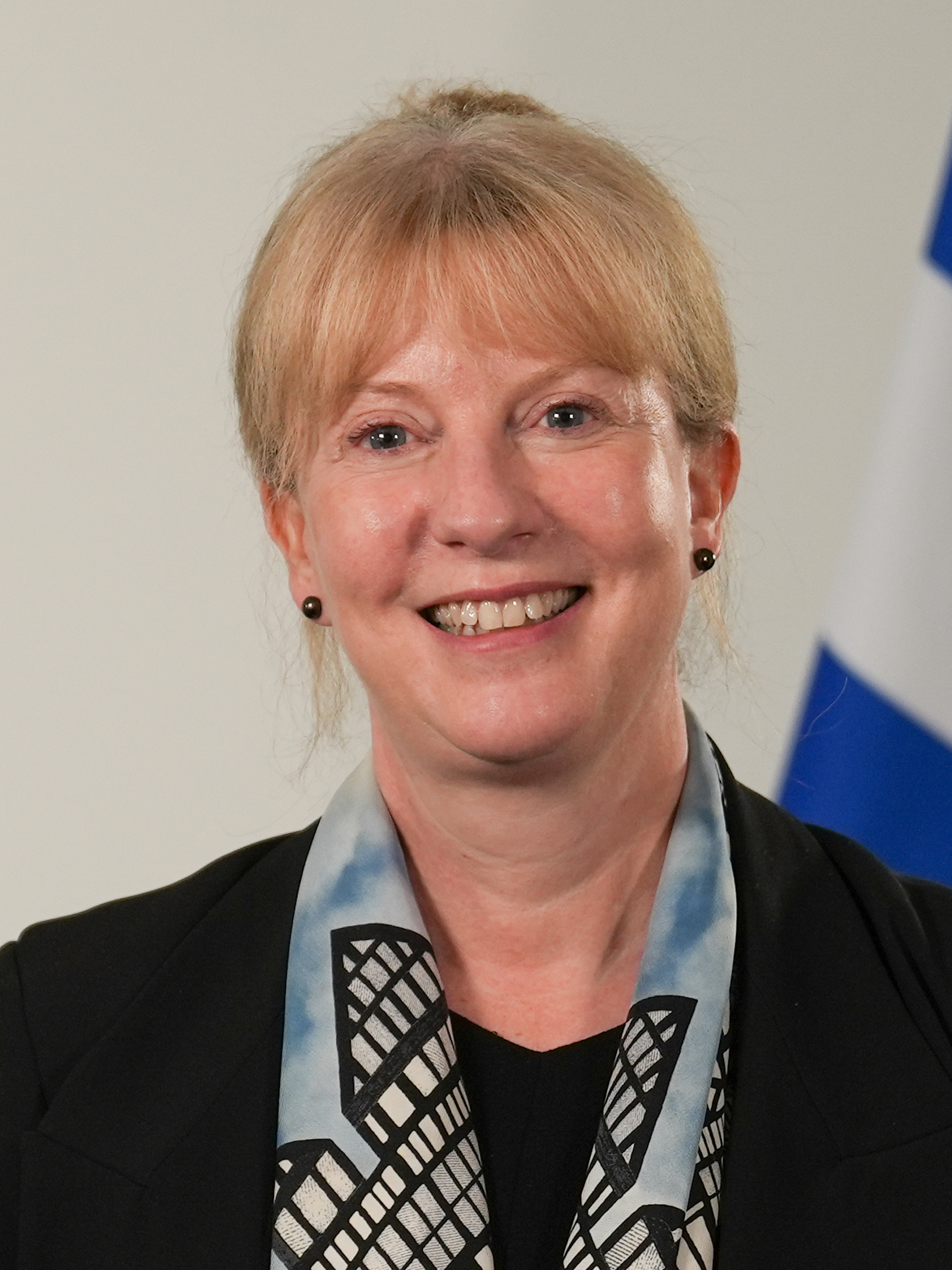
- Official portrait, 2024

Deputy First Minister of Scotland
- In office 29 March 2023 – 8 May 2024
- First Minister: Humza Yousaf
- Preceded by: John Swinney
- Succeeded by: Kate Forbes
Ministerial offices 2007‍–‍2026
Cabinet Secretary for Finance and Local Government (Note: As Cabinet Secretary for Finance from 29 March 2023 to 8 May 2024)
In office 29 March 2023 – 20 May 2026
First Minister	Humza Yousaf; John Swinney
Preceded by	Kate Forbes
Succeeded by	Jenny Gilruth
Cabinet Secretary for Social Justice, Housing and Local Government (Note: Cabinet Secretary for Commonwealth Games, Sport, Equalities and Pensioners' Rights in 2014.)
In office 20 May 2021 – 29 March 2023
First Minister	Nicola Sturgeon
Preceded by	Shirley-Anne Somerville (Social Security); Aileen Campbell (Communities and Local Government)
Succeeded by	Shirley-Anne Somerville
In office 22 April 2014 – 21 November 2014
First Minister	Alex Salmond
Preceded by	Office established
Succeeded by	Alex Neil
Cabinet Secretary for Health and Sport
In office 21 November 2014 – 26 June 2018
First Minister	Nicola Sturgeon
Preceded by	Alex Neil
Succeeded by	Jeane Freeman
Minister for Commonwealth Games and Sport
In office 19 May 2011 – 22 April 2014
First Minister	Alex Salmond
Preceded by	Office created
Succeeded by	Office abolished
Minister for Public Health and Sport
In office 17 May 2007 – 19 May 2011
First Minister	Alex Salmond
Preceded by	Lewis Macdonald
Succeeded by	Michael Matheson
Parliamentary offices 1999‍–‍2026
Member of the Scottish Parliament for Dundee City East Dundee East (2003–2011)
In office 1 May 2003 – 9 April 2026
Preceded by	John McAllion
Succeeded by	Stephen Gethins
Member of the Scottish Parliament for North East Scotland (1 of 7 Regional MSPs)
In office 6 May 1999 – 31 March 2003

Personal details
- Born: Shona McRory Robison; 26 May 1966 (age 60) Redcar, North Riding of Yorkshire, England
- Party: Scottish National Party
- Spouse: Stewart Hosie (m. 1997; div. 2017)
- Children: 1
- Education: University of Glasgow; Jordanhill College
- Website: shona.robison.scot

Shona McRory Robison (born 26 May 1966) is a Scottish politician who served as Deputy First Minister of Scotland from 2023 to 2024. A member of the Scottish National Party (SNP), she held various ministerial positions in the Scottish government between 2007 and 2026, lastly as Cabinet Secretary for Finance and Local Government from 2023 to 2026. Robison served as the Member of the Scottish Parliament (MSP) for Dundee City East from 2003 (Note: The constituency was known as Dundee East until 2011, when it was renamed and redrawn as part of the First Periodical Review of Scottish Parliament Boundaries.) to 2026 and was an additional member for the North East Scotland region from 1999 to 2003.

Robison served as Minister for Public Health and Sport from 2007 to 2011. She then oversaw the Scottish Government's preparations for the 2014 Commonwealth Games as Minister for Commonwealth Games and Sport from 2011 to April 2014, when she was promoted to the Scottish Cabinet by Alex Salmond as Cabinet Secretary for Commonwealth Games, Sport, Equalities and Pensioners' Rights. When Nicola Sturgeon succeeded Salmond as First Minister in November 2014, she appointed Robison the Cabinet Secretary for Health and Sport.

In 2018, she resigned from government during a cabinet reshuffle after being widely criticised for her poorly received tenure as Health Secretary. She returned to the backbenches, where she served on the justice and health committees. In 2021, Robison returned to Sturgeon's government as the Cabinet Secretary for Social Justice, Housing and Local Government. During her tenure in the position, she oversaw the government's efforts to pass the controversial Gender Recognition Reform (Scotland) Bill.

Following Sturgeon's resignation as first minister in 2023, Robison was appointed Deputy First Minister and Finance Secretary by Humza Yousaf in his new government. After Yousaf's resignation and the subsequent appointment of John Swinney as First Minister in 2024, Robison resigned as Deputy First Minister but retained her finance portfolio in Cabinet, with additional responsibility for local government. She stood down as an MSP at the 2026 election.

== Early life ==
Shona McRory Robison was born in Redcar, North Riding of Yorkshire, England, on 26 May 1966. She attended Alva Academy in Clackmannanshire. She gained a Master of Arts in Social Science at the University of Glasgow in 1989. The following year, she gained a Postgraduate Cert in Community Education at Jordanhill College.

Robison joined the Scottish National Party (SNP) in 1988. She was an active member of the party's youth wing the Young Scottish Nationalist, now known as Young Scots for Independence, where she met the likes of Nicola Sturgeon and Fiona Hyslop.

Before being elected to the Scottish Parliament, she worked in Glasgow City Council's Social Work Department.

== Early parliamentary career ==
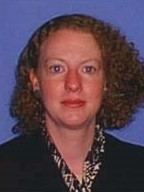
Official parliamentary portrait, 1999

=== SNP in opposition; 1997–2007 ===
Robison contested in the first election to the Scottish Parliament for the Dundee East constituency. Although she was unsuccessful, having came second to Scottish Labour's John McAllion, she was elected as an additional member for the North East Scotland region. In her first term, she was member of the Health and Community Care Committee and was the Deputy Convenor of the Equal Opportunities Committee.

She served in the SNP's opposition cabinet as the shadow deputy minister for health and community care.

In the 2003 Scottish Parliament election, Robison successfully defeated McAllion by just 90 votes in Dundee East. She served as the Shadow Minister for Health and Social Justice in the SNP's opposition benches. Robison was a member of the Health Committee.

=== Junior ministerial career; 2007–2014 ===
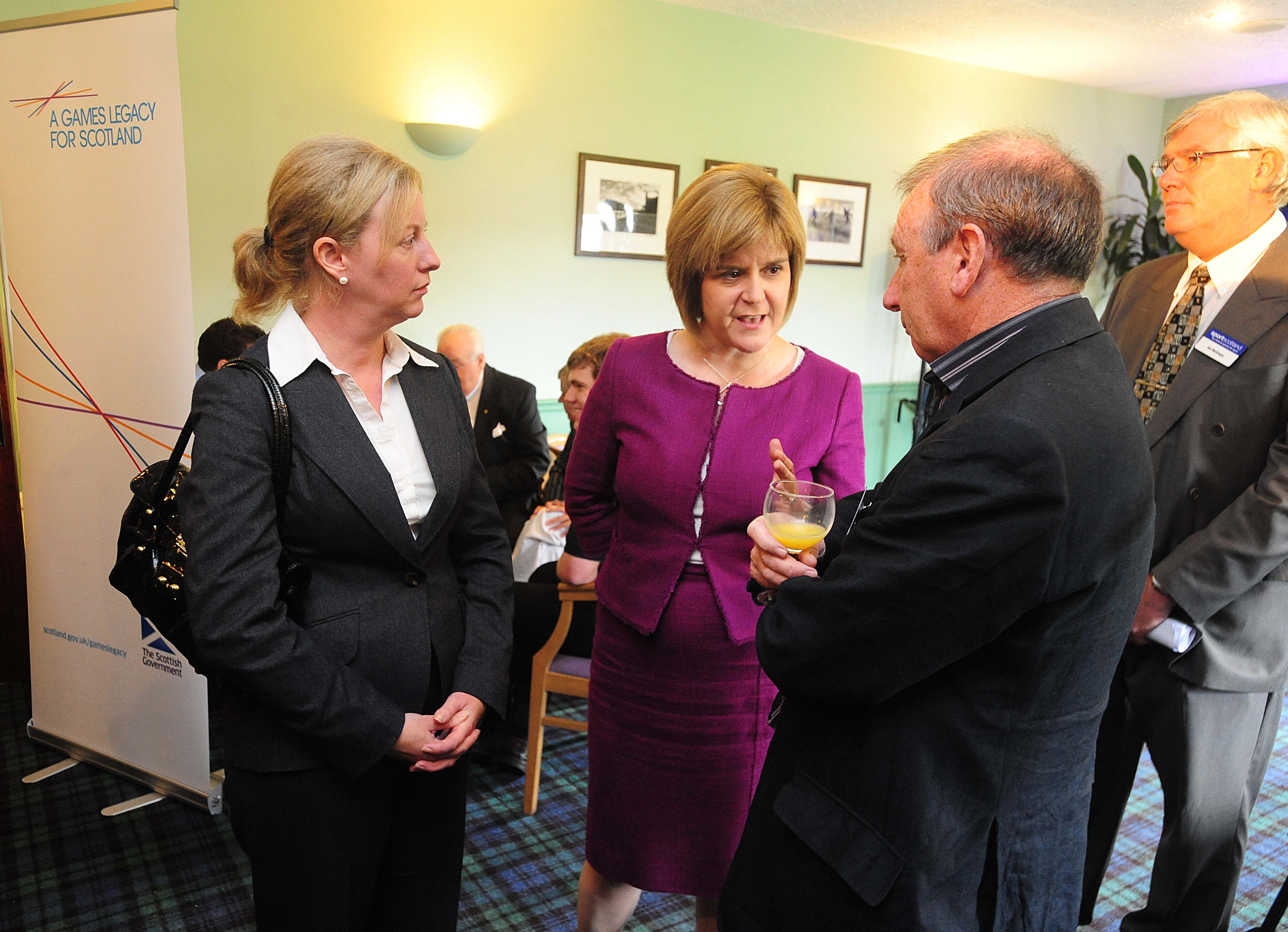
Robison with Nicola Sturgeon at am Active Nation reception in Kirkcaldy, 2011

After the SNP's victory in the 2007 election, Robison was appointed as the Minister for Public Health. In 2009, she added Sport onto her portfolio. In the 2011 election, Robison was re-elected into the newly drawn, Dundee City East constituency. She was appointed Minister for Commonwealth Games and Sport.

In the run up to the Scottish independence referendum in 2014, Robison wrote to the University of Dundee to complain that a Dundee professor had chaired an event for the Better Together campaign. Robison insisted that Christopher Whatley's involvement in the Five Million Questions project about the implications of the referendum meant he should have taken a neutral stance on the constitutional issue. However, Scottish Conservative leader Ruth Davidson said: "I'm not sure this kind of bullying and intimidation is the best advert for the SNP's vision of a future separate Scotland. In fact, it is chilling."

In April 2014, Alex Salmond promoted her to the full Cabinet position of Cabinet Secretary for Commonwealth Games, Sport, Equalities and Pensioners' Rights.

== Cabinet Secretary for Health (2014–2018) ==
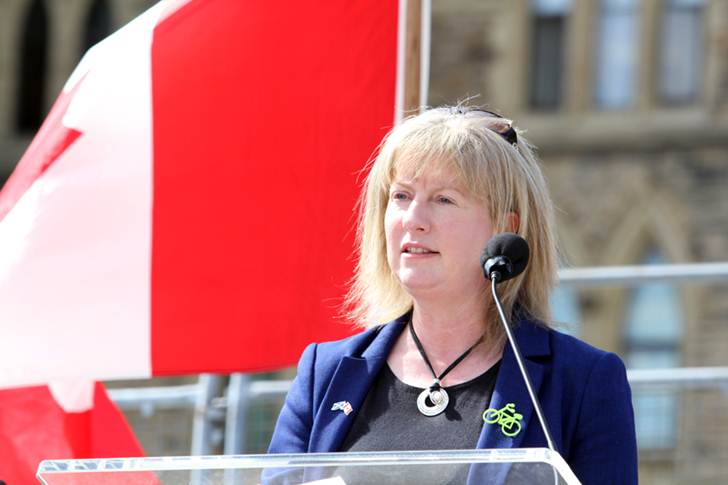
Robison speaking at the Parliament of Canada, 2014

On 21 November 2014, Robison was appointed by Sturgeon as Cabinet Secretary for Health, Wellbeing and Sport, in Sturgeon's first government. Following the 2016 election, she was reappointed into Sturgeon's cabinet as Cabinet Secretary for Health and Sport. In January 2018, during an appearance at Holyrood's Health and Sport Committee, she was warned by Labour MSP Neil Findlay of a "drugs disaster". In 2018, Scotland went on to record the highest number of drug deaths per head in the European Union, at a rate nearly three times higher than the UK average.

On 26 June 2018, she announced her intention to resign from Cabinet. Shortly after a cabinet reshuffle was made by Sturgeon. BBC political correspondent Glenn Campbell wrote after the reshuffle: "The most widely anticipated departure was t/hat of health secretary, Shona Robison. She's been under considerable pressure over NHS performance. She stood down on the day the Scottish government confirmed its worst cancer waiting times for six years."

== Backbenches (2018–2021) ==
Following her resignation from government, Robison returned to the backbenches. She served on the Parliament's Justice Committee and Social Security Committee. Amid the outbreak of the Coronavirus pandemic, she served as a member of the COVID-19 Committee.

In February 2021, Audit Scotland published a report that concluded the Scottish Government had not prepared adequately for a pandemic. The watchdog also noted that recommendations from pandemic planning exercises during Robison's time as Health Secretary had not been fully implemented. One particular failure it highlighted was that not enough had been done to ensure Scottish hospitals and care homes had enough personal protective equipment (PPE). Overall, it concluded that ministers "could have been better prepared to respond to the Covid-19 pandemic". Nicola Sturgeon said there were "lots of lessons to learn".

== Third Sturgeon government (2021–2023) ==
=== Social Justice Secretary ===
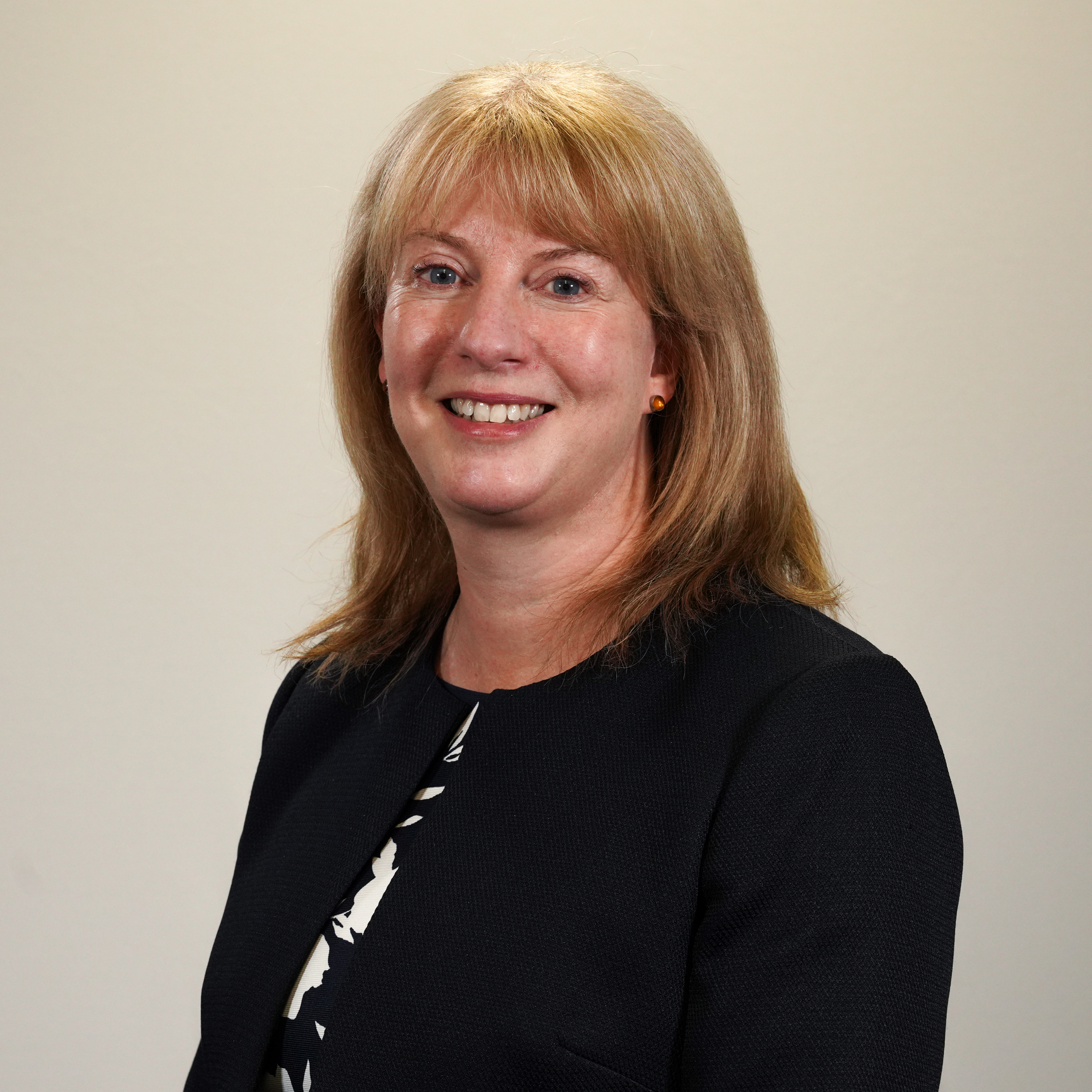
Official portrait as Social Justice Secretary, 2021

On 20 May 2021, Sturgeon announced her third government, with Robison returning as Cabinet Secretary for Social Justice, Housing and Local Government. Robison held the position of Cabinet Secretary for Social Justice until the election of Humza Yousaf as First Minister in March 2023. Following a cabinet reshuffle, Yousaf appointed Shirley-Anne Somerville as Robison's replacement and promoted Robison to Deputy First Minister and Cabinet Secretary for Finance.

=== Gender Recognition Reform (Scotland) Bill ===
During Robison's tenure in the Social Justice department, she oversaw the implementation of the Gender Recognition Reform (Scotland) Bill which was received with backlash from many fearing it was jeopardising the safety of women. Robison reassured MSPs and the public that the bill did "not conflict with work to advance women's rights and equality" and that she was "conscious that some of the details of the proposed reforms have become lost within the wider discussions around trans rights and the perceived conflict with the rights of women and girls". The bill intended to introduce a process of self-declaration for transgender people, allowing them to obtain a gender recognition certificate (GRC), thus removing the need for a psychiatric diagnosis of gender dysphoria before being allowed to change their gender legally. In December 2022, 150 amendments had been put forward to the Scottish Parliament regarding the bill which saw MSPs sit and debate the bill in the Scottish Parliament chamber long into the evening. Robison wrote to three individual MSPs claiming that their amendments put the bill "at serious risk".

The bill was blocked by the UK Government, with Robison stating that she would "vigorously contest" any attempt by the UK Government to block the gender reform legislations which the Scottish Parliament has control over. Under Section 35 of the Scotland Act 1998, Prime Minister Rishi Sunak blocked the implementation of the gender reform bill. This marked the first time that the UK Government had blocked a piece of legislation from being passed since devolution.

== Deputy First Minister (2023–2024) ==
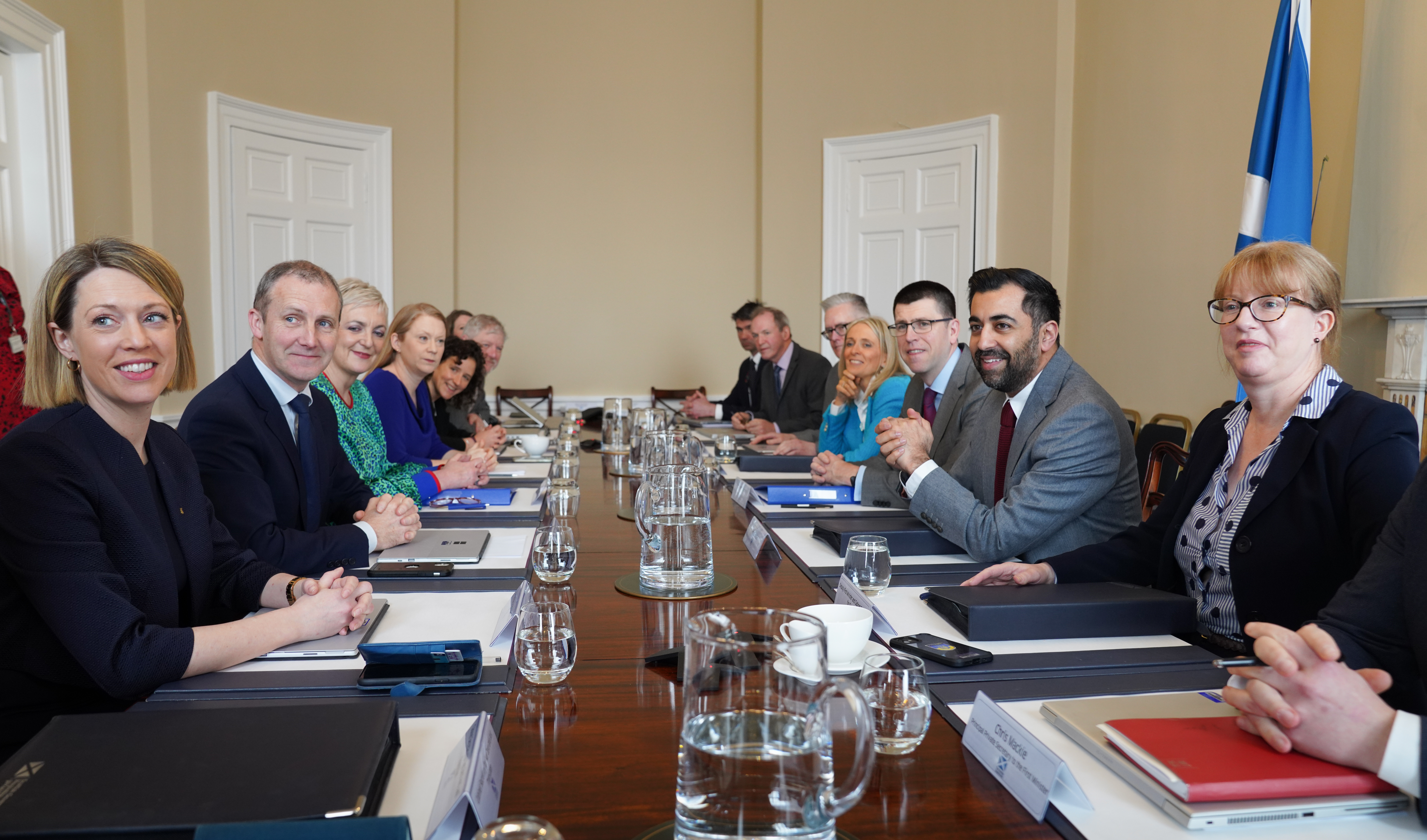
Robison (front right) at a cabinet meeting of the First Yousaf government, March 2023

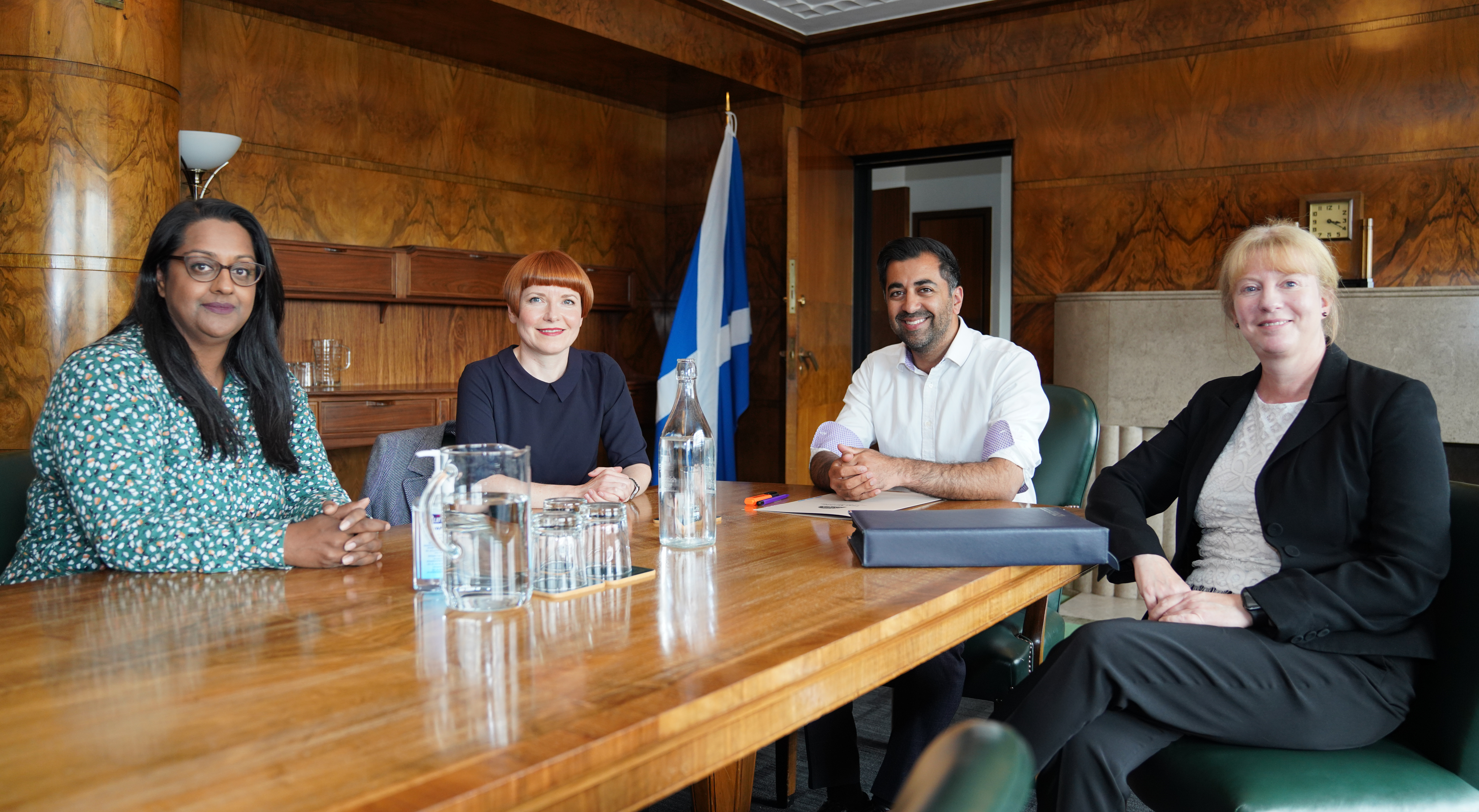
Robison (right) meets National Advisory Council on Women and Girls Co-Chairs with the First Minister

On 28 March 2023, newly elected First Minister Humza Yousaf announced Robison as his deputy first minister of Scotland. She was officially sworn into office the next day and was appointed finance secretary in Yousaf's new government.

In July 2023, Robison intervened in the speculation over Inverclyde Royal Hospital being downgraded. Robison issued a statement through an interview with The Telegraph on the issue, stating that the hospital would not be downgraded or lose its casualty department, citing the fact that the Emergency Department at Inverclyde Royal Hospital was "one of the best performing A&E's in Scotland, certainly within NHS Greater Glasgow and Clyde. Robison committed further money for improvements to both NHS Scotland services and facilities, citing proposals set out to be met by 2026.

=== Cabinet Secretary for Finance ===
Robison said that her immediate priorities as Finance Secretary was "more efficient public services and fair work" being at the heart of the Economy of Scotland. In April 2023, Robison launched the Scottish Government's Portfolio Prospectus which sets out a number of economic actions to be achieved by 2026. These include proposals for creating the UK's most progressive tax system to assist in the delivery of Scottish public services, new opportunities to tackle poverty and measures to grow the wellbeing economy whilst increasing the number of employees earning the real living wage, while narrowing the gender pay gap. Additionally, the Scottish Government has an ambition of spearheading Scotland as a leading European start-up nation for the creation of new businesses as well as developing Scotland's existing international exports while developing into new international trading market. Robison also recognising the importance of re-developing Scotland's infrastructure and economy to allow it to be more sustainable in the future, with plans for laying foundations to produce 5 Gigawatts (GW) of hydrogen production by 2030, as part of a Scottish hydrogen supply chain. As Finance Secretary, Robison will commit to implementing a "New Deal" for Scottish local authorities.

Robison delivered her first Medium–Term Financial Strategy to the Scottish Parliament in May 2023. Robison highlighted the importance of "sound public finances" being "key to ensuring we can tackle poverty and build a fair, green and growing economy whilst improving our public services". Robison claimed that the current economic situation in Scotland had "been amongst the most challenging since devolution", citing global issues such as the COVID-19 pandemic, the 2022 Russian invasion of Ukraine and soaring inflation being driving factors directly impacting the Scottish economy. Robison was also critical of UK Government policy and decision making that had impacted on Scotland, including Brexit and its association economic impact, "a decade of austerity" and the September 2022 United Kingdom mini-budget.

==== Public sector workforce ====
In November 2023, Robison claimed that the workforce within Scotland's public sector "will have to shrink" as a result of funding pressure. Robison claimed that public sectors such as health would be protected from any proposals to reduce the workforce, claiming that "tight budgets and inflation-driven pay deals" may require other public sectors to see their workforce reduced.

During an interview on The Sunday Show on the BBC, Robison said "This will be one of the most difficult budgets under devolution and we will be having a number of challenges around how to make sure we can invest what we can in public services. But I need to be honest with the public that this budget, this UK Tory budget and the chancellor's decisions have made my job very difficult. This is the worst case scenario for the Scottish budget".

==== Council tax freeze ====
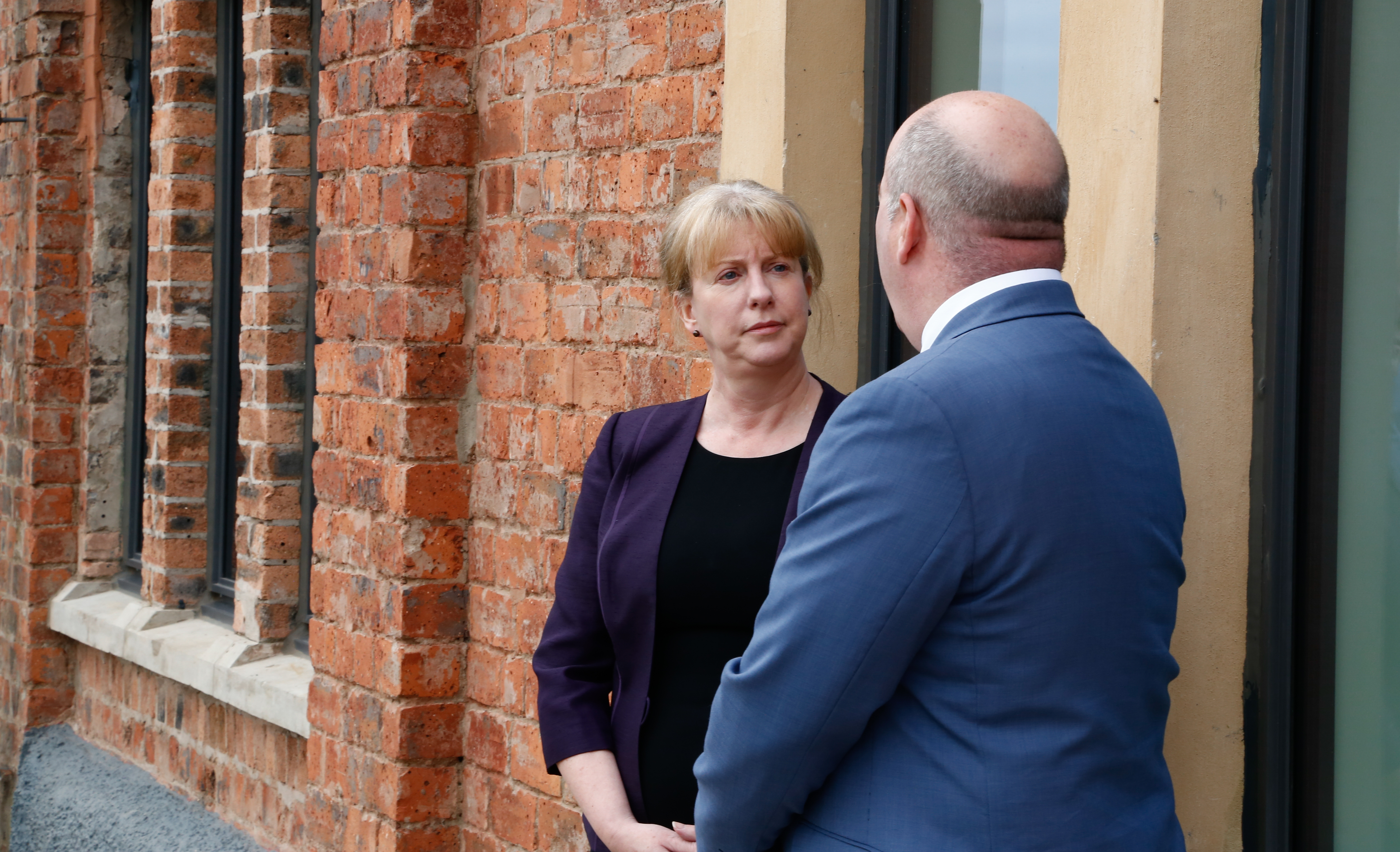
Robison during a visit to Clyde Gateway, 2023

Ahead of the 2024 Scottish budget, the Yousaf government intended to maintain the council tax freeze which had been in place in Scotland since the first SNP led government came to power in 2007. However, two Scottish local authorities – Argyll and Bute Council and Inverclyde Council defied the Scottish Government and approved plans to increase the rate of council tax in their respective areas. Argyll and Bute Council voted for a 10% rise and Inverclyde Council a 8.2% increase to council tax. The administrations of Argyll and Bute Council and Inverclyde Council asked for additional funding from the Scottish Government to assist in maintaining a council tax freeze in their local authorities, with Robison saying that "if approved, it means households across the whole country would benefit from help during the cost of living crisis". COSLA Resources Spokesperson, Councillor Katie Hagmann, explained that Robison's proposals to allocate £144 million in the Scottish budget to fund the council tax freeze will "not fully fund a council tax freeze". Hagmann criticised the proposals, saying that "the Scottish Budget has not provided our local authorities with a fully funded council tax freeze as expected. The Scottish Government has set aside £144 m stating this will ‘fully fund’ a council tax freeze – this would only provide the income equivalent to a 5% rise".

By April 2024, all Scottish local authorities, including Argyll and Bute Council and Inverclyde Council who had previously voted to increase council tax rates, confirmed that council tax would be frozen across all of Scotland's 32 local authorities after both Argyll and Bute and Inverclyde Councils voted to accept the Scottish Government funding package to support a council tax freeze for the forthcoming financial year. In a statement, Robison said that "many households continue to struggle with the impact of rising prices, and this council tax freeze – funded by the Scottish Government – is just one of many ways that we’re offering support. Council tax is already lower in Scotland than elsewhere in the UK, and over two million households will now benefit from this freeze. We deeply value the role local authorities play in Scotland’s communities, which is why – in the face of a profoundly challenging financial situation – we have made available record funding of more than £14 billion to councils in 2024–25, a real-terms increase of 2.5% compared with the previous year".

==== 2024–2025 Scottish budget ====
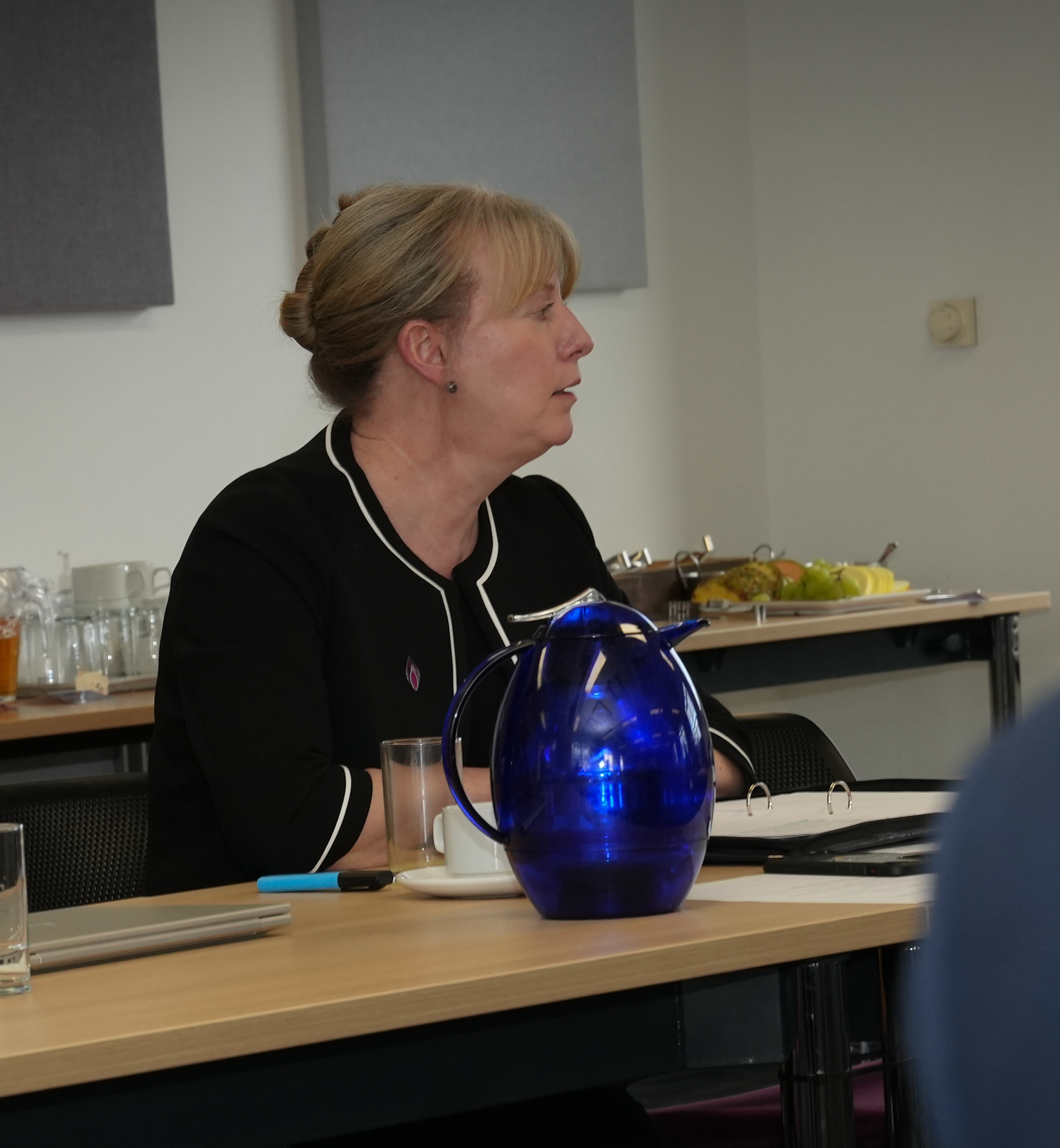
Robison at a FISC meeting in Edinburgh, January 2024

Robison delivered the 2024–2025 Scottish budget to the Scottish Parliament in December 2023. Upon setting the budget, Scotland faced a £1.5 billion black hole in finances. Robison confirmed the Scottish budget for 2024–2025 to be £59.7 billion, with the budget said to be being delivered "at a critical point for Scotland as we transition from the pandemic and respond to the impacts of inflation and the economic shocks caused by Brexit, the war in Ukraine". £19.5 billion was allocated to the Scottish Government department of NHS Recovery, Health and Social Care, £12.9 billion to finance, £7.5 billion to Social Justice, £3.9 billion to transport, £3.8 billion for education and Justice and Home Affairs, £2 billion for Wellbeing Economy, Net Zero and Energy, £1.1 billion for rural affairs, islands and land reform, £315.6 million for culture and foreign affairs, and £223 million for the Crown Office and Procurator Fiscal Service.

In February 2024, Robison wrote to Jeremy Hunt, the Chancellor of the Exchequer, where she was critical of the UK Governments proposals as set out in the 2024 UK Spring Budget. In the letter, Robison claimed that "economic outlook for the UK continues to look uncertain and while inflation has fallen compared to a year ago, it is still high and this is continuing to place a considerable strain on both public sector and household budgets". Whilst she highlighted the continued strength of the economy of Scotland, she expressed concerns about the reduction in funding made available to the Scottish Government, as well as to other devolved governments, through the block grant. She claimed "Block Grant funding has fallen by 1.2% in real terms since 2022–23 and our UK capital funding is set to fall by almost 10% in real terms between 2023–24 and 2027–28", and as a result of the decrease in funding, argued for "increased investment by the UK Government in public services and infrastructure, as has been recognised by the International Monetary Fund". She also addressed the continued "fallout" facing the economy as a result of Brexit, again highlighting that the majority of the Scottish electorate voted against leaving the European Union. Robison argued that Brexit continues to have a negative impact on Scottish businesses as a result of additional complexities and increased costs as a result of leaving the European single market. Additionally, she highlighted to Hunt "National Institute of Economic and Social Research shows the UK economy is now 2.5% smaller than it would have been in the European Union, a gap which could increase to 5.7% by 2035".

The Scottish government confirmed up to £500 million in spending cuts as Robison explained that these savings were crucial for supporting the 2024–2025 Scottish budget. She attributed the financial pressures to prolonged Westminster austerity, Brexit, the war in Ukraine, and the cost of living crisis. Despite criticisms from opposition and advocacy groups, Robison defended the need for tough decisions to maintain fiscal responsibility.

=== Resignation ===
Upon the resignation of Humza Yousaf and the subsequent election of John Swinney, on 8 May 2024 Robison resigned as Deputy First Minister. In her resignation letter to Swinney, Robison stated that the previous week she believed stepping down from the role in favour of Kate Forbes would help bring the SNP together. Forbes replaced her as Deputy First Minister.

== Cabinet Secretary for Finance and Local Government (2024–2026) ==
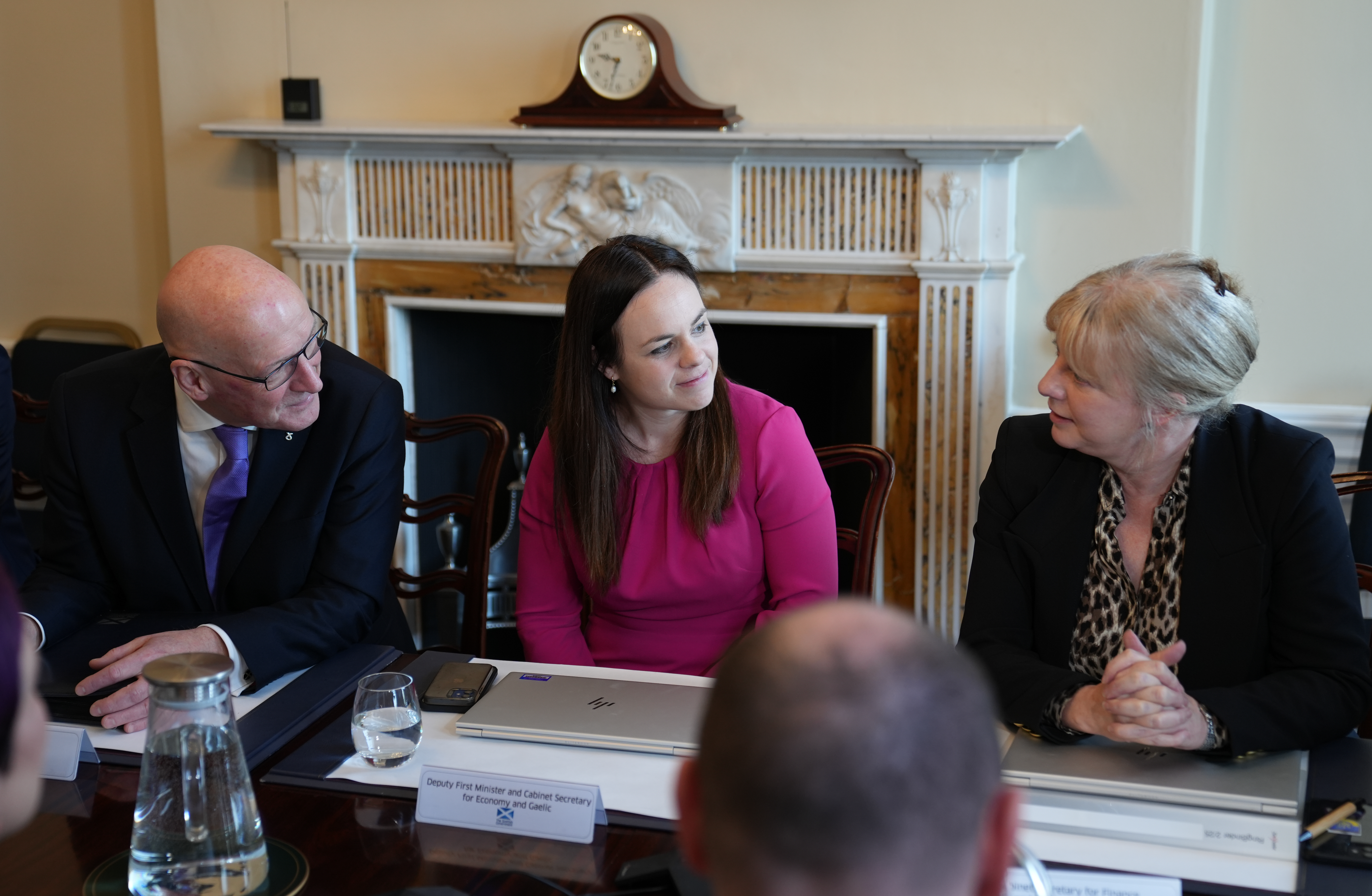
Robison (right) with First Minister John Swinney (left) and Deputy First Minister Kate Forbes (centre), May 2024

In the cabinet of John Swinney, Robison retained the Finance portfolio and gained the additional portfolio of Local Government.

=== Local government pay disputes ===
In August 2024, a series of strikes were set to impact on public sector services across Scotland including schools, refuse and other local government employees in a dispute over pay. Strike action was formally called off by the three largest trade unions in Scotland following an intervention from the Scottish Government which pledged an additional £77.5 million to pay for an improved pay offer. The additional funding from the Scottish Government enabled the Convention of Scottish Local Authorities (COSLA) to make an improved pay offer to trade unions to consult with their members. The new pay offer would see an overall increase of 4.27%, with a rise of 5.63% offered to the lowest paid local government employees. Following the announcement of additional funding to provide an improved pay offer, Robison stated that both she and the Scottish Government "value this vital workforce" but warned that to fund the improved offer "money from elsewhere in the budget will have to be moved and this will reduce funding for other programmes".

In October 2024, strikes in Perth and Kinross closed schools, including in the constituency of incumbent first minister John Swinney, over pay disputes. The strikes were announced by trade union Unison and last for two weeks, with non–teaching staff, early years staff, janitorial and catering staff taking strike actions. Teachers were not striking during the strike action. In response, the first minister, John Swinney, called for an end to the strikes stating that he hopes "Unison will continue meaningful dialogue with local government and join colleagues by accepting the offer and ending industrial action", with Robison claiming that there was "no more money available" for improved local government pay deals.

=== 2025 Scottish budget ===
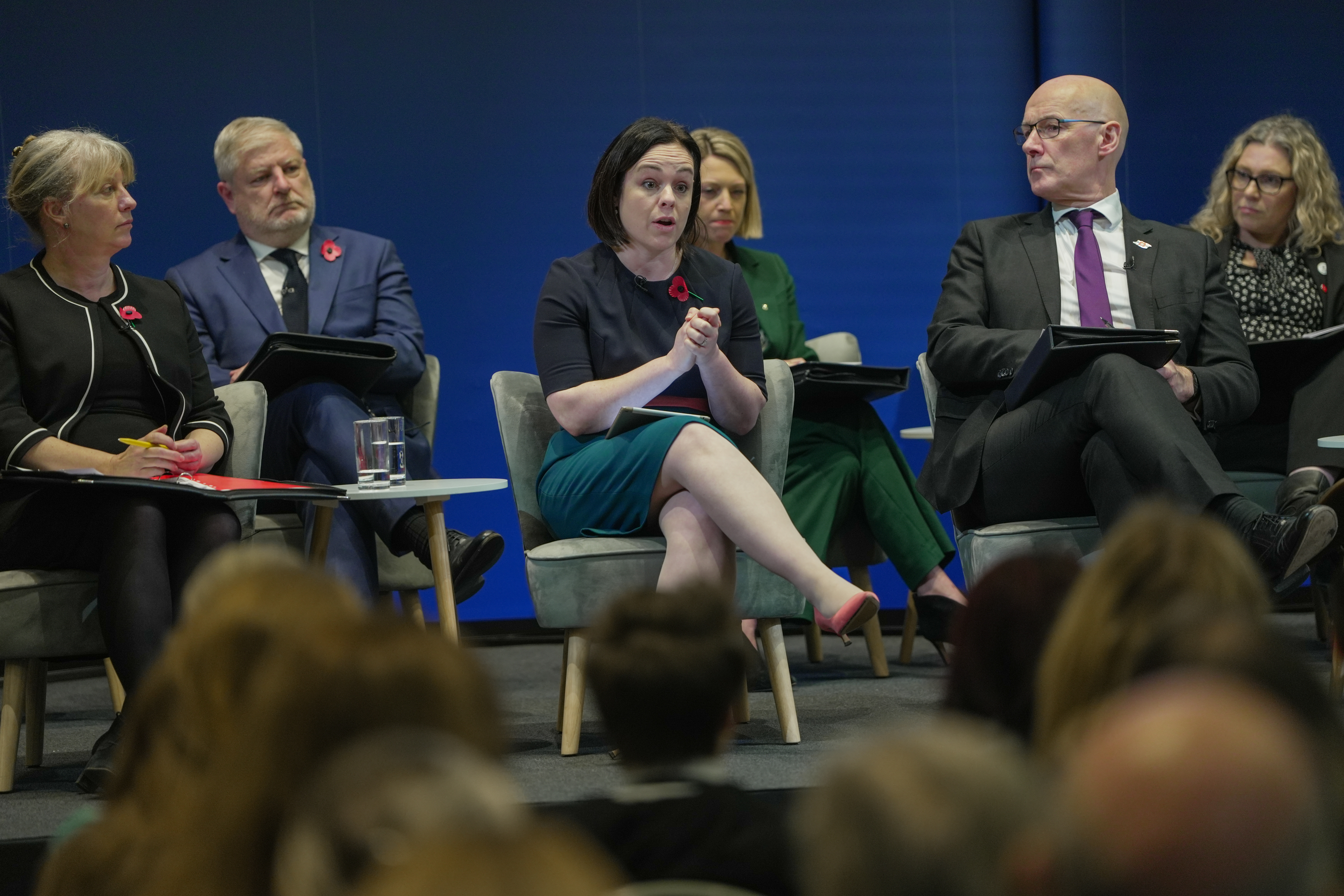
Robison (left) with the Scottish cabinet in Ayr, November 2024

Ahead of the 2025 Scottish budget, Robison stated that as a consequence of the increase to the amount of National Insurance public sectors employers pay which was announced by the UK Government that Scotland "must be compensated" by HM Treasury. She made the comments following the Chancellor of the Exchequer Rachel Reeves outlining the 2024 Autumn budget which is speculated to have a decrease in funding of £500 million available to Scottish Government. Reeves suggested that an additional £3.4 billion in investment which would be made available to the Scottish Government did "not include compensation" and she encouraged the Scottish Government to spend the extra investment "wisely". It was further announced by Reeves that the Scottish Government would receive an additional £1.5 billion to compensate for additional staff costs as a result of the public sector workforce in Scotland being larger than that in the United Kingdom as a whole.

Robison demanded "urgent clarity" on the announcement of additional funding to compensate for increased staffing in public sector services in Scotland. There had been suggestions that Scotland could be "short changed" if the compensation amount for the increase in National Insurance is not proportional to the size of the public sector in Scotland. Following the Autumn budget outlined by Reeves, Robison welcomed the budget claiming it was "a step in the right direction" but said that as a result of the budget, the Scottish Government "will still face enormous cost pressures". Robison stated that she would carefully assess the Autumn budget in full ahead of her announcement of the Scottish Budget on 4 December 2024.

Robison delivered the 2025 Scottish budget to the Scottish Parliament on 4 December 2024. In the budget, Robison pledged that the Scottish Government would end the two child benefit cap in 2026. Additionally, record spending for the National Health Service in Scotland was announced, with £21 billion being earmarked for the NHS in order to reduce waiting times and to ensure access to GPs was easier for the public. Additional measures announced in the budget included extra winter payments for the elderly, funding to tackle the climate emergency and scrapping the council tax freeze. Opposition parties in the Scottish Parliament were critical of the budget, with Scottish Labour stating that the government was "going in the wrong direction", whilst the Scottish Conservatives claimed that budget was "more of the same" from previous budgets set by the Scottish Government.

=== 2026 Scottish election ===
Robison did not seek re–election as an MSP in the 2026 Scottish Parliament elections, having announced her intention to stand down on 5 March 2025.

== Personal life ==
She was married to Stewart Hosie, who was the Westminster MP for Dundee East and was previously the SNP's Depute Leader. They have one daughter. Robison experienced a miscarriage in 2007. It was announced on 15 May 2016 that the couple had separated. This was followed by reports that Hosie had had an affair with Westminster-based freelance journalist Serena Cowdy.

== Footnotes ==
Scottish Parliament
New parliament Scotland Act 1998	Member of the Scottish Parliament for North East Scotland; 1999–2003	Succeeded by Marlyn Glen
Preceded by John McAllion	Member of the Scottish Parliament for Dundee East; 2003–2011	Constituency abolished
New constituency	Member of the Scottish Parliament for Dundee City East; 2011–2026	Succeeded by Stephen Gethins
Political offices
Preceded by John Swinney	Deputy First Minister of Scotland; 2023–2024	Succeeded by Kate Forbes
Preceded by Kate Forbes as Cabinet Secretary for Finance and the Economy	Cabinet Secretary for Finance; 2023–present	Incumbent
Preceded by Lewis Macdonald as Deputy Minister for Health and Community Care	Minister for Public Health and Sport; 2007–2011	Succeeded by Michael Matheson
New office	Minister for Commonwealth Games and Sport; 2011–2014	Succeeded by Jamie Hepburn as Minister for Sport, Health Improvement and Mental Health
New office	Cabinet Secretary for Social Justice, Communities and Pensioners' Rights; 2014	Succeeded by Alex Neil
Preceded by Alex Neil	Cabinet Secretary for Health and Sport; 2014–2018	Succeeded by Jeane Freeman
Preceded by Aileen Campbell	Cabinet Secretary for Social Justice, Housing and Local Government; 2021–2023	Succeeded by Shirley-Anne Somerville
