= Regional member changes in the Scottish Parliament =

Under the provisions of the Scotland Act 1998, regional members of the Scottish Parliament who resign, die or are otherwise disqualified are replaced by the next available and willing person of their original party's list, so no by-election occurs.

These are the changes that have occurred since the first elections in 1999.

== List of regional list member changes ==
=== 2026–present Parliamentary term ===
Region	Date	Incumbent	Party	Replacement	Party	Cause
Glasgow	22 July 2026	Anas Sarwar	Labour	Monica Lennon	Labour	Resignation following appointment to House of Lords
North East Scotland	24 June 2026	Douglas Lumsden	Conservative	James Adams	Conservative	Resignation (elected as MP)

=== 2021–2026 Parliamentary term ===
Region	Date	Incumbent	Party	Replacement	Party	Cause
Highlands and Islands	9 February 2024	Donald Cameron	Conservative	Tim Eagle	Conservative	Resignation following appointment to House of Lords
Mid Scotland and Fife	5 September 2022	Dean Lockhart	Conservative	Roz McCall	Conservative	Resignation (to pursue new opportunities)

=== 2016–2021 Parliamentary term ===
Region	Date	Incumbent	Party	Replacement	Party	Cause
Lothian	15 July 2019	Kezia Dugdale	Labour	Sarah Boyack	Labour	Resignation (Appointment as director of the John Smith Centre for Public Service)
Highlands and Islands	13 June 2017	Douglas Ross	Conservative	Jamie Halcro Johnston	Conservative	Resignation (elected as MP)
North East Scotland	13 June 2017	Ross Thomson	Conservative	Tom Mason	Conservative	Resignation (elected as MP)
South Scotland	4 May 2017	Rachael Hamilton	Conservative	Michelle Ballantyne	Conservative	Resignation in order to contest Ettrick, Roxburgh and Berwickshire
North East Scotland	7 December 2016	Alex Johnstone	Conservative	Bill Bowman	Conservative	Death

=== 2011–2016 Parliamentary term ===
Region	Date	Incumbent	Party	Replacement	Party	Cause
Mid Scotland and Fife	11 January 2016	Richard Baker	Labour	Lesley Brennan	Labour	Resignation
Lothian	4 April 2014	Margo MacDonald	Independent	None (seat left vacant)	N/A	Death
Lothian	12 August 2013	David McLetchie	Conservative	Cameron Buchanan	Conservative	Death
North East Scotland	15 May 2013	Mark McDonald	SNP	Christian Allard	SNP	Resignation in order to contest Aberdeen Donside
Mid Scotland and Fife	7 December 2012	John Park	Labour	Jayne Baxter	Labour	Resignation to take up a post with the Community Trade Union

=== 2007–2011 Parliamentary term ===
Region	Date	Incumbent	Party	Replacement	Party	Cause
Glasgow	6 February 2009	Bashir Ahmad	SNP	Anne McLaughlin	SNP	Death
Lothians	31 August 2007	Stefan Tymkewycz	SNP	Shirley-Anne Somerville	SNP	Resignation to concentrate on Edinburgh City Council work.

=== 2003–2007 Parliamentary term ===
Region	Date	Incumbent	Party	Replacement	Party	Cause
Highlands and Islands	19 April 2006	Mary Scanlon	Conservative	Dave Petrie	Conservative	Resignation in order to contest Moray
North East Scotland	19 April 2006	Richard Lochhead	SNP	Maureen Watt	SNP	Resignation in order to contest Moray
South of Scotland	22 June 2005	David Mundell	Conservative	Derek Brownlee	Conservative	Resignation (elected as MP)
Mid Scotland and Fife	10 January 2005	Keith Raffan	Liberal Democrats	Andrew Arbuckle	Liberal Democrats	Resignation (citing health)

=== 1999–2003 Parliamentary term ===
Region	Date	Incumbent	Party	Replacement	Party	Cause
Mid Scotland and Fife	14 August 2001	Nick Johnston	Conservative	Murdo Fraser	Conservative	Resignation (ill health)

== See also ==
- Elections in Scotland
- List of by-elections to the Scottish Parliament
- Regional member changes to the Senedd
