= List of by-elections to the Scottish Parliament =

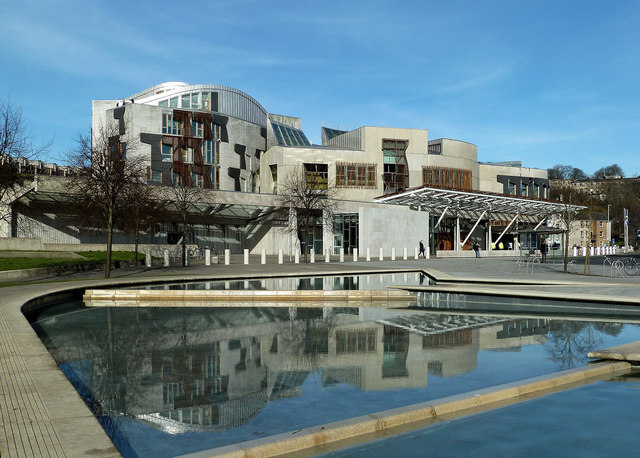
Scottish Parliament Building and adjacent water pool, 2017

The Scottish Parliament is the devolved legislature of Scotland. It was founded in 1999. The 129 members of the Scottish Parliament (MSPs) are elected using the additional member system. 73 MSPs are elected through the first-past-the-post system in the Parliament's single-member constituencies, while 56 are elected in the regions to ensure results are proportional. There are 8 regions, electing 7 MSPs each. By-elections to the Parliament occur when a constituency seat becomes vacant, due to the death or resignation of a member.

There were no by-elections in the 3rd Scottish Parliament term (2007–11).

== By-elections ==
Where seats changed political party at the by-election, the result is highlighted: pink for a Labour gain, and blue for a Conservative gain

List of by-elections for constituency members
Parliament	By-election	Date	Incumbent	Party	Winner	Party	Cause	Ref
6th	Hamilton, Larkhall and Stonehouse	5 June 2025	Christina McKelvie	SNP	Davy Russell	Labour	Death (breast cancer)	
5th	Shetland	29 August 2019	Tavish Scott	Liberal Democrats	Beatrice Wishart	Liberal Democrats	Resignation (to take a new role at Scottish Rugby)	
5th	Ettrick, Roxburgh and Berwickshire	8 June 2017	John Lamont	Conservative	Rachael Hamilton	Conservative	Resignation (to contest a seat in the 2017 UK general election)	
4th	Cowdenbeath	23 January 2014	Helen Eadie	Labour	Alex Rowley	Labour	Death (cancer)	
4th	Dunfermline	24 October 2013	Bill Walker	SNP	Cara Hilton	Labour (Note: Gain not retained at the 2016 Scottish Parliament election)	Resignation (convicted of assault)	
4th	Aberdeen Donside	20 June 2013	Brian Adam	SNP	Mark McDonald	SNP	Death (cancer)	
2nd	Moray	27 April 2006	Margaret Ewing	SNP	Richard Lochhead	SNP	Death (breast cancer)	
2nd	Glasgow Cathcart	29 September 2005	Mike Watson	Labour	Charlie Gordon	Labour	Resignation (convicted of fire-raising)	
1st	Banff and Buchan	7 June 2001	Alex Salmond	SNP	Stewart Stevenson	SNP	Resignation (to focus on the Parliament of the United Kingdom)	
1st	Strathkelvin and Bearsden	7 June 2001	Sam Galbraith	Labour	Brian Fitzpatrick	Labour	Resignation (health reasons)	
1st	Glasgow Anniesland	23 November 2000	Donald Dewar	Labour	Bill Butler	Labour	Death (brain hemorrhage)	
1st	Ayr	16 March 2000	Ian Welsh	Labour	John Scott	Conservative (Note: Gain retained at the 2003 Scottish Parliament election)	Resignation (family reasons)	

== See also ==
- Regional member changes in the Scottish Parliament
- List of by-elections to the Senedd
- Elections in Scotland
