= Harlaw Academy =

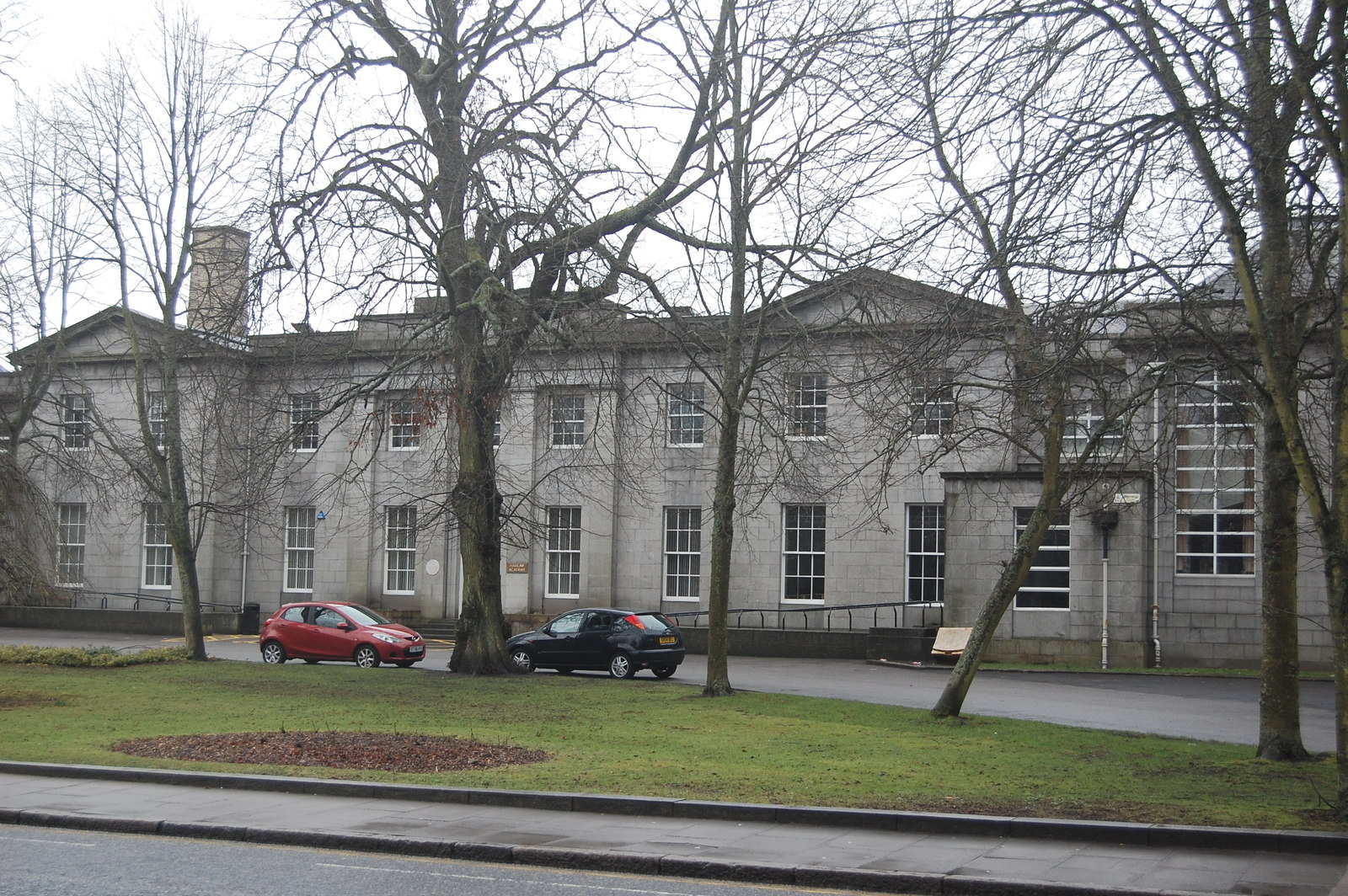
- The exterior of the school, as seen from Albyn Place.

Location
- 18-20 Albyn Place; Aberdeen, AB10 1RG; Scotland; 57.142222°N 2.116667°W

Information
- Type: Secondary school
- Motto: by Learning and Courtesy
- Established: 1874 (current location 1893)
- Local authority: Aberdeen City Council
- Head teacher: Stuart Craig
- Staff: 85 (approx)
- Gender: Coeducational
- Age: 11 to 18
- Enrolment: 950 (approx)
- Colours: Navy blue, Silver and Maroon
- School years: S1-S6
- Website: Harlaw Academy

Harlaw Academy is a six-year comprehensive secondary school situated approximately 300 metres (330 yd) from the junction of Union Street and Holburn Street in the centre of Aberdeen, Scotland. It is directly adjacent to St Margaret's School for Girls. The academy draws most of its pupils from its associated primary schools, namely, Broomhill Primary School, Ferryhill Primary School, Kaimhill Primary School and Hanover Street School. Stuart Craig has been the head teacher since 2024.

== History ==
The school was established in Little Belmont Street as the Aberdeen High School for Girls in 1874. The school moved to 19 Albyn Place, where it amalgamated with Mrs. Elmslie's Institution which occupied a prominent building designed by Archibald Simpson, in 1891.

The Former Pupils' Club established a fund for the acquisition of a playing field at Hazlehead, as well as the cost of building and equipping a pavilion there.

During the First World War, the building was requisitioned by the War Office to create the 1st Scottish General Hospital, a facility for the Royal Army Medical Corps to treat military casualties.

Subsequent changes included the abolition of fees in 1947, the phasing out of the primary department in 1971 and the introduction of the city's area comprehensive system which brought about the changing of the school's name to Harlaw Academy in 1970. Ruthrieston Secondary School was to become part of Harlaw Academy in 1972.

In 2010, Harlaw Academy was threatened with closure, as part of the Aberdeen City Council's programme of financial cutbacks. This created serious concerns in the feeder communities which launched a successful campaign to save the school.

== Head teachers ==
Past and present head teachers include:

- John McBain 1874–1913
- Lucy Ward 1913–1929
- Beatrice Rose 1929–1957
- Margaretta McNab 1957–1971
- Alexander Chalmers 1971–1985
- Norman Horne 1985–1993
- John Murray 1993–2012
- David Innes 2012–2020
- Ross McLaren 2020–2024
- Stuart Craig 2024–Present

== Notable former pupils ==
Notable alumni include:

- Annie Lennox, singer and member of the musical group Eurythmics
- Nan Shepherd (1893–1981), modernist novelist and poet
- Dr Nanette Milne, former Scottish Conservative MSP for North East Scotland (1999-2016)
- Elaine Thomson, former Scottish Labour MSP for Aberdeen North (1999-2003)
- Graeme Dey, Scottish National Party MSP for Angus South and Scottish Government Minister for Parliamentary Business and Veterans.
- Ray Michie (1934–2008), Baroness Michie of Gallanach, former MP for Argyll and Bute and Liberal Democrat Spokesperson on Scotland
- Sonia Dresdel, film and television actress between the 1940s and 70s.
- David Robertson, former footballer for Aberdeen, Rangers, Leeds United and Scotland
- Pauline Cook, former newsreader and journalist for STV North's nightly news programme, North Tonight.
- Lisa Milne, soprano.
