= Aberdeen North =

Aberdeen North may refer to:

- Aberdeen North (UK Parliament constituency)
- Aberdeen North (Scottish Parliament constituency)
