= 2017 Westminster sexual misconduct allegations =

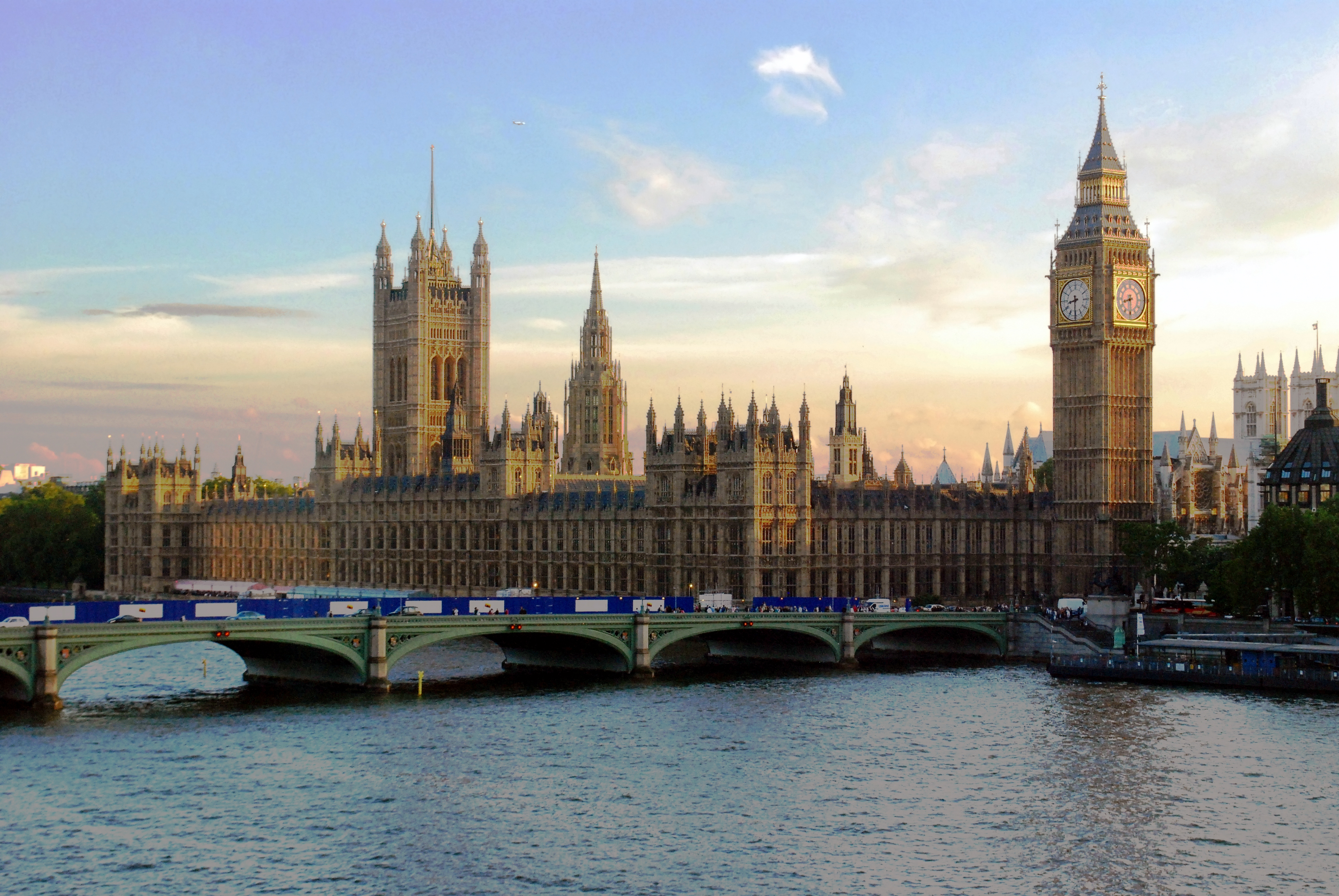
The Palace of Westminster, home of the UK Parliament, where the scandals arose

A series of allegations concerning the involvement of British politicians in cases of sexual harassment and assault arose in October and November 2017. Allegations were prompted by discussions among junior staff employed in the UK Parliament at Westminster following the Harvey Weinstein sexual abuse allegations in Hollywood earlier in October, and the subsequent rise of the #MeToo movement, but spread further to cover all the major political parties, including political figures beyond Westminster.

Prime Minister Theresa May wrote to the Speaker of the House of Commons, John Bercow, asking for his assistance in establishing a "house-wide mediation service" supported by a "contractually binding grievance procedure" that would be available for all MPs. May also stated that current House of Commons disciplinary procedures required urgent reform, for they lacked "teeth".

A spreadsheet that alleged various sexual improprieties by Conservative MPs – listed alongside consensual acts – was published in a redacted form by Guido Fawkes on 30 October 2017. It detailed complaints against 36 individual MPs; the complaints were said to have been compiled by aides working for the parliamentarians concerned. The BBC's then-political editor Laura Kuenssberg described the list as containing "both a mixture of unsavoury allegations, reports of well-known relationships, and some claims that are furiously denied. There is just no way of knowing frankly, how much of it is true".

In February 2020, historical allegations were examined in a report by the Independent Inquiry into Child Sexual Abuse, which claimed that both MPs and the police had turned a blind eye for years.

== Conservative Party allegations ==
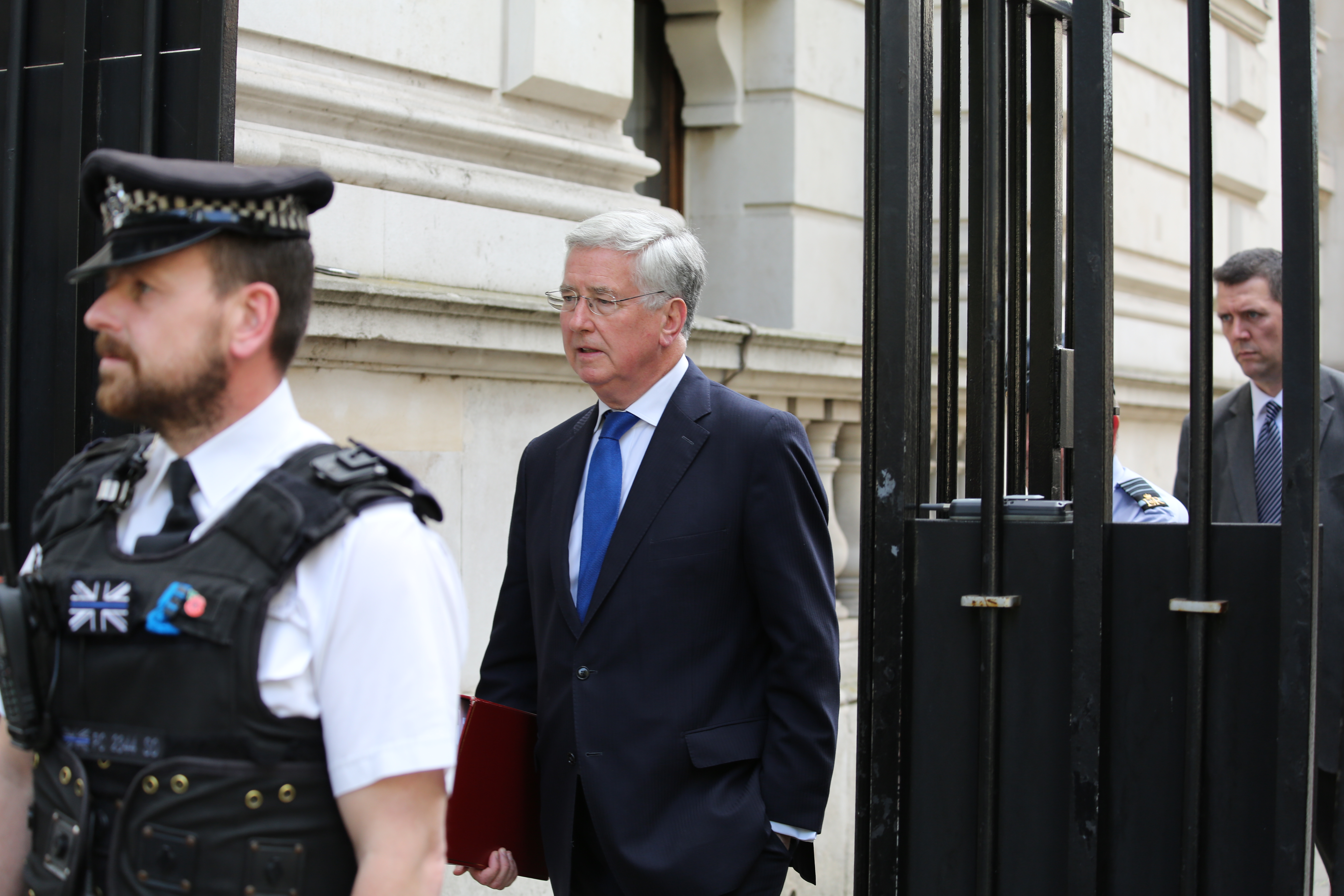
Sir Michael Fallon resigned on 1 November 2017

- Michael Fallon, the Secretary of State for Defence, resigned on 1 November 2017 because his behaviour towards women had "fallen short" previously. He told the BBC: "The culture has changed over the years. What might have been acceptable 10, 15 years ago is clearly not acceptable now". A day earlier, journalist Julia Hartley-Brewer alleged that he had repeatedly and inappropriately touched her knee during a dinner in 2002. Hartley-Brewer recalled that after Fallon kept putting his hand on her knee, she "calmly and politely explained to him that, if he did it again, I would punch him in the face". She later downplayed the incident. "No one was remotely upset or distressed", Hartley-Brewer said. It was later reported that Fallon had resigned shortly after journalist Jane Merrick had contacted No. 10 with the allegation that Fallon had tried to kiss her in 2003 by lunging at her. Fallon did not deny that this happened.
- Stephen Crabb, the former Secretary of State for Work and Pensions, was reported by The Daily Telegraph (28 October 2017) to have sent sexually suggestive text messages to a young woman he had interviewed for a position in his parliamentary office which he said "basically amount to unfaithfulness".
- Mark Garnier, the Parliamentary Under-Secretary of State for International Trade, admitted on 29 October 2017 to calling his assistant Caroline Edmondson "sugar tits" and asking her to purchase sex toys for his wife and a constituent in 2010. Garnier claimed that the "sugar tits" comment was a reference to the BBC Three sitcom Gavin and Stacey and that "It absolutely does not constitute harassment". Edmondson said in the interview with The Mail on Sunday that Garnier "suggested to me in a Commons bar one evening that we went shopping for sex toys in Soho. The next day, he said: 'Come on, let's do it.' He took me to Soho and gave me the money to buy two vibrators. He stood outside the shop while I did". An inquiry into Garnier's behaviour was announced by the Cabinet Office.
- Dominic Raab and Rory Stewart were both mentioned on the spreadsheet, and both denied claims of impropriety on 1 November 2017. Raab said that claims he had engaged in sexually abusive behaviour or harassed anyone were "false and malicious" and stated that the claims on the spreadsheet "need to be taken seriously". Raab said that for "anonymous individuals to compile and publish, or allow to be published, a list of vague, unsubstantiated and – in my case – false allegations is wrong" and that it was "also a form of harassment and intimidation, although of course I am not suggesting it is the same or equivalent". Stewart was described on the list as having asked his former parliamentary researcher, Sophie Bolsover, to "do odd things". Stewart said the claim was "completely untrue and deeply hurtful. Neither of us have any idea how our names appeared on the list". Bolsover said that "During my time working in parliament, Rory Stewart was never anything other than completely professional and an excellent employer".
- On 4 November 2017, Chris Pincher, the Comptroller of the Household, was accused of sexual assault by former Labour MP Tom Blenkinsop, and former Olympic rower Alex Story made allegations that Pincher had made unwanted sexual advances towards him. Later that day Pincher resigned from his position as Comptroller.
- On 5 November 2017, Dan Poulter and Daniel Kawczynski were referred to the Conservative Party's disciplinary panel following allegations of sexual misconduct.
- Damian Green, First Secretary of State and Minister for the Cabinet Office, was accused of sexually harassing behaviour by a Conservative activist, Kate Maltby, and was also separately alleged to have viewed pornography on his work computer. Following an inquiry into these allegations, he resigned from the Cabinet on 20 December 2017.
- Charlie Elphicke, Member of Parliament for Dover and former Lord Commissioner of the Treasury, was suspended from the Conservative Party in November 2017 after "serious allegations" made against him were referred to the police. Elphicke stated: "I am not aware of what the alleged claims are and deny any wrongdoing." In March 2018, Elphicke was told that he was accused of sex offences against two members of his staff. He said in response: "I am completely confident I will be able to prove my innocence." In April 2018, The Sunday Times reported that a rape allegation had been made against Elphicke in November 2017, at the height of the Westminster sex scandals, but that the police had not informed him of it for about five months.

== Labour Party allegations ==
- Bex Bailey, a Labour Party activist and a former member of Labour's National Executive Committee, stated that she was raped in 2011, when she was 19 years old, by someone who was senior to her in the Labour Party. The person was not a member of parliament. Bailey waived her right to anonymity in 2017 to make the allegation. Bailey did not initially report the rape to the police or within the Labour Party, but two years later she told a senior party official. She said that "It took me a while to summon up the courage to tell anyone in the party ... But when I did, I told a senior member of staff, who told me ... or it was suggested to me that I not report it, I was told that if I did it might damage me". After Bailey described the rape and subsequent events in a BBC Radio 4 interview on 31 October 2017, the Labour Party announced an independent investigation into her allegations; Jeremy Corbyn, the leader of the Labour Party, said that "There will be no tolerance in the Labour Party for sexism, harassment or abuse ... Whatever it takes, we are absolutely committed to rooting it out".
- Kelvin Hopkins, the Labour MP for Luton North, was suspended by his party on 2 November 2017 following a report from The Daily Telegraph of sexual harassment allegations made by a Labour activist, Ava Etemadzadeh, which included inappropriate text messages and making unwanted physical contact at a political event. Etemadzadeh first reported the incidents to party official two years earlier. Labour's Chief Whip at the time, Rosie Winterton, is reported to have reprimanded Hopkins. Hopkins denied the allegations of inappropriate conduct. On 10 November 2017 fellow Labour MP Kerry McCarthy released correspondence that she had received from Hopkins over a 20-year period, which she stated was "unwanted attention" and "upsetting"; these were also to be given to the Labour Party inquiry as evidence of Hopkins' behaviour. They had first come into contact when both were active in the Luton Labour Party during the 1990s.
- Clive Lewis, the Labour MP for Norwich South, was accused by a 39-year-old woman of groping her at Momentum's "World Transformed" event. In response to the accusation, Lewis said he was "pretty taken aback" by the accusation, and "completely" and "categorically" denied the claim. He was cleared by Labour's National Executive Committee sexual harassment panel on 12 December 2017.
- Ivan Lewis, the Labour MP for Bury South, was accused of sexually harassing a 19-year-old at a Labour Party event. He denied the claim on 4 November 2017, but apologised for behaviour that "was unwelcome or inappropriate in the circumstances, and caused anyone to feel awkward". He was suspended from the Labour Party and resigned a year later.
- David Prescott, an aide to Jeremy Corbyn and son of former Deputy Prime Minister John Prescott, was suspended from his work for the Labour Party amid ongoing allegations. Prescott had been credited with improving Corbyn's image. Details of the allegations were not released, and he was reinstated later in November.
- On 26 November 2017, The Sunday Times reported that an unnamed Labour Party staff member, based at its London headquarters in Victoria, had died suddenly while on suspension and during an investigation into pornographic images that were found on his computer.

== Resulting actions ==
On 6 November 2017, a meeting took place between leaders of the political parties at Westminster. Theresa May proposed that a new system be set up for Westminster employees, with a hotline for abuse to be reported, and an independent grievance process. Liberal Democrat leader Vince Cable described the proposals as "the right first cross-party steps", and Green Party co-leader Caroline Lucas said that the meeting had been "broadly constructive and helpful" but that "we did not get into much of the detail".

== Political scandals beyond Westminster ==
=== Scotland ===
- Mark McDonald, the Scottish National Party MSP for Aberdeen Donside, resigned as Minister for Childcare and Early Years in the Scottish Parliament on 4 November 2017, after inappropriate sexual behaviour.
- On 5 November 2017, Willie Coffey, the Scottish National Party MSP for Kilmarnock and Irvine Valley, was accused by a female civil servant of "inappropriate language" and "unsolicited attention" but denied any wrongdoing.
- Monica Lennon, the Scottish Labour MSP for Central Scotland, said on 5 November 2017 that she had been sexually assaulted by one of her colleagues within the Labour Party.
- Alex Salmond, former First Minister of Scotland, resigned from the SNP amid allegations of sexual misconduct while he was First Minister. In a statement, he said that he wanted to avoid internal division within the party and intended to apply to rejoin the SNP once he had an opportunity to clear his name. On 24 January 2019, Salmond was arrested by police and charged with attempted rape. In March 2020, he was found not guilty of 12 counts of sexual assault, with one count found not proven (not proven and not guilty have the same legal effect in Scotland).

=== Wales ===
- On 3 November 2017, Carl Sargeant, the Welsh Labour AM for Alyn and Deeside, was sacked as Cabinet Secretary for Communities and Children after being suspended from the Labour Party following allegations about his behaviour. He committed suicide on 7 November 2017. Two days later, Alun Michael, Police and Crime Commissioner for South Wales, asked Carwyn Jones, First Minister of Wales, to set out the allegations made against Carl Sargeant.

== See also ==
- Chris Pincher scandal
