= 2013 Aberdeen Donside by-election =

- 20 June 2013

Aberdeen Donside
- Turnout: 38.8% (▼9.0 pp)
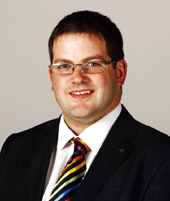

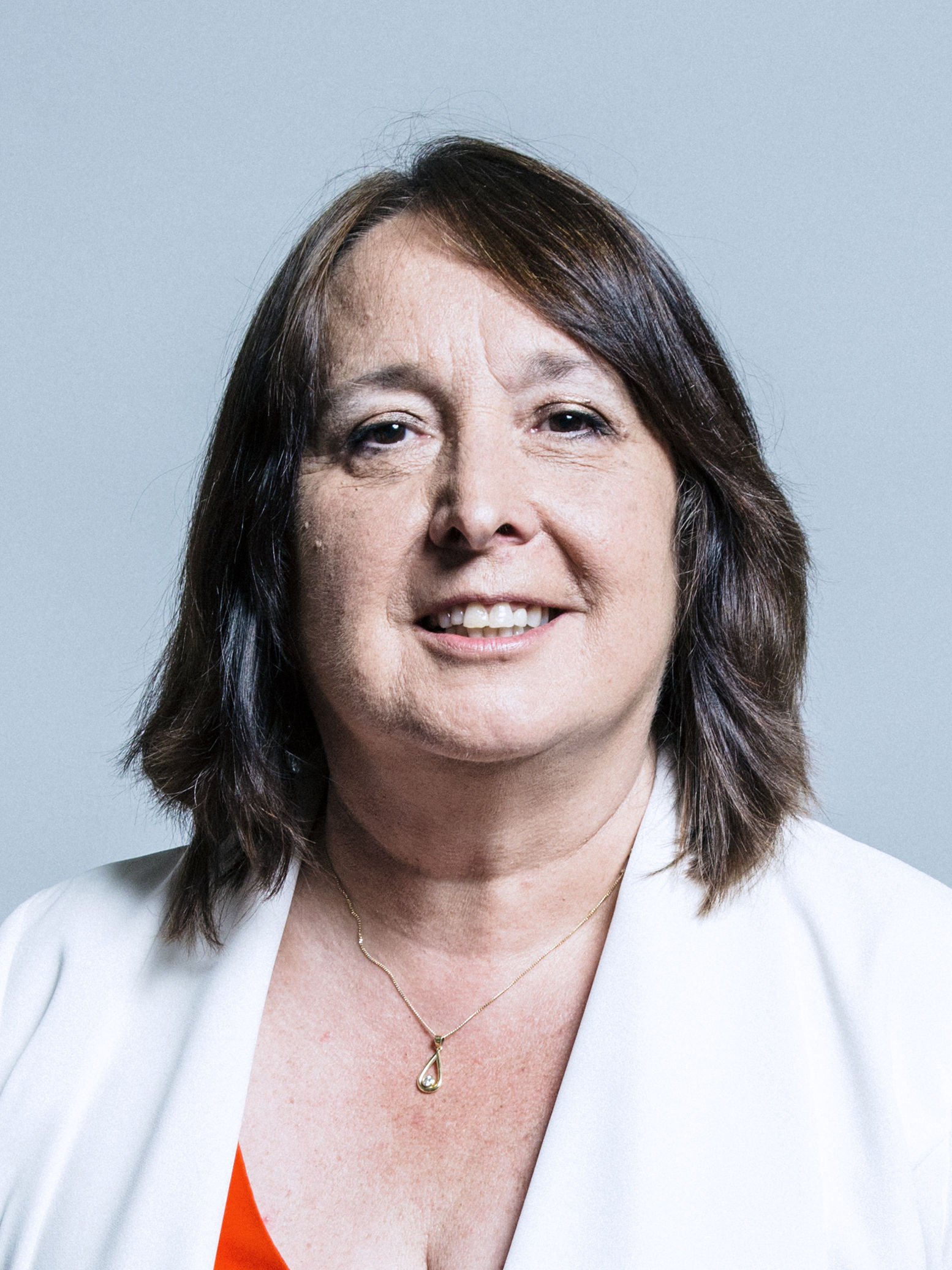

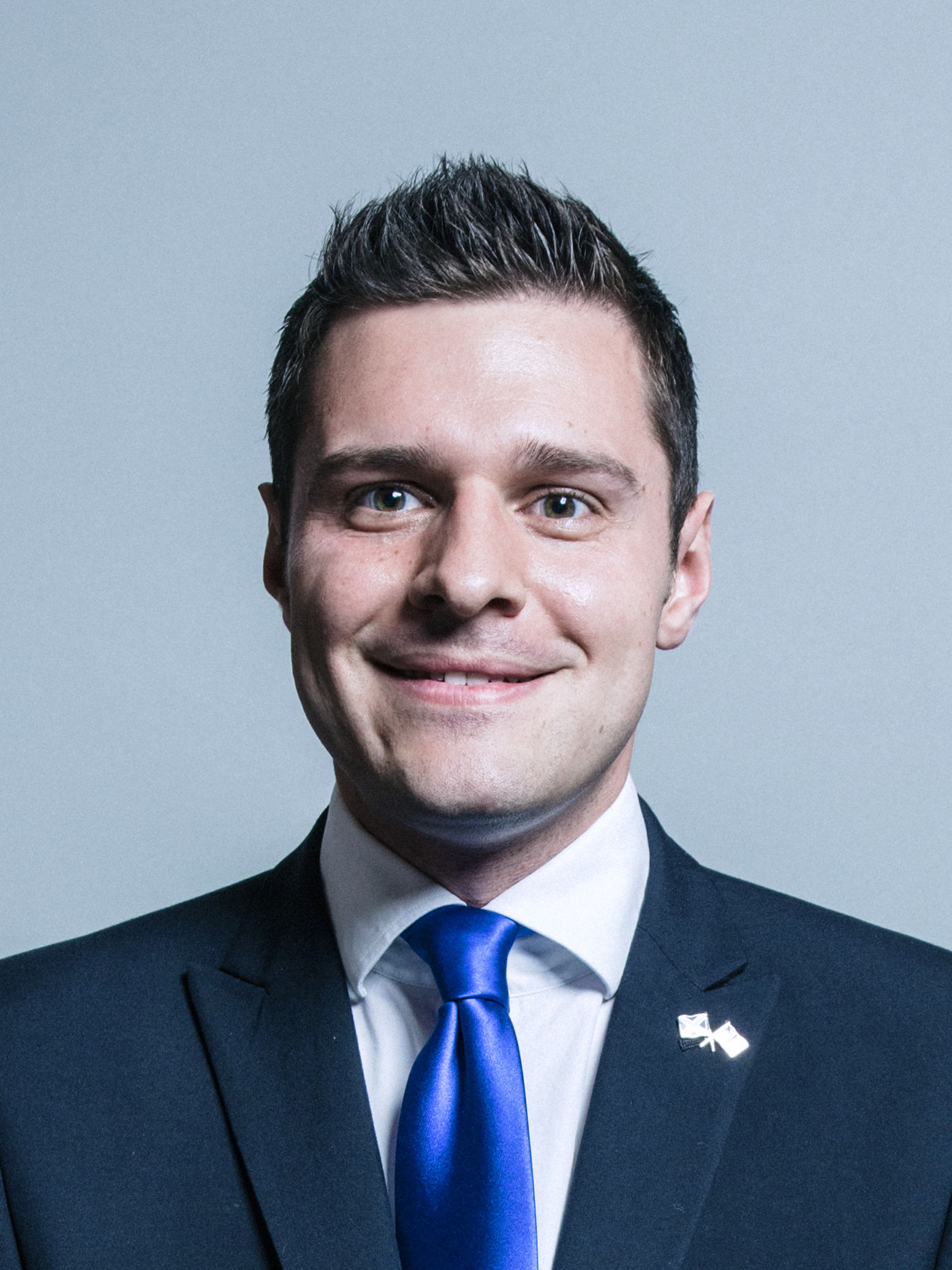
	First party	Second party
Candidate	Mark McDonald	Willie Young
Party	SNP	Labour
Popular vote	9,814	7,789
Percentage	41.98%	33.32%
Swing	▼13.42 pp	▲4.82 pp
	Third party	Fourth party
Candidate	Christine Jardine	Ross Thomson
Party	Liberal Democrats	Conservative
Popular vote	1,940	1,791
Percentage	8.30%	7.66%
Swing	▲3.10 pp	▼0.44 pp
MSP before election
Brian Adam
SNP
Elected MSP
Mark McDonald
SNP

The 2013 Aberdeen Donside by-election was a by-election that was held for the Scottish Parliament constituency of Aberdeen Donside on Thursday 20 June, following the death from cancer of the constituency's MSP, Brian Adam.

The seat was created as Aberdeen North following the establishment of the Scottish Parliament in 1999. In the first election to the Scottish Parliament the seat was won by the Scottish Labour Party, but was gained by Brian Adam (who had contested, but lost, the seat in 1999) for the Scottish National Party in the next election. He held the seat in 2007 and 2011 with increased majorities. In the last election, Adam held the seat with a majority of 7,175 votes.

In the 2011 Scottish Parliament election, the SNP became the first ever majority government of the Scottish Parliament, winning 69 seats out of 129. Prior to Adam's death, however, the SNP only held a majority of one (following the election of Tricia Marwick as presiding officer and the departure of three other MSPs). This meant that if the SNP lost the by-election then the government would lose its overall majority.

SNP list MSP for the North-East region, Mark McDonald, resigned his seat to contest the constituency by-election. McDonald held the seat for the SNP, but with a significantly reduced majority on a lower turnout.

== Result ==
Nine candidates contested the election, with their details published on 17 May 2013.

Aberdeen Donside by-election, 20 June 2013
Party	Candidate	Votes	%	±%
SNP	Mark McDonald	9,814	41.98	−13.42
Labour	Willie Young	7,789	33.32	+4.82
Liberal Democrats	Christine Jardine	1,940	8.30	+3.10
Conservative	Ross Thomson	1,791	7.66	−0.44
UKIP	Otto Inglis	1,128	4.83	+4.03
Green	Rhonda Reekie	410	1.75	New
National Front	Dave MacDonald	249	1.07	+0.27
Scottish Christian	Tom Morrow	222	0.95	New
SDA	James Trolland	35	0.15	New
Majority		2,025	8.66	−18.2
Turnout		23,396	38.8	−9.0
SNP hold		Swing	-5.5	

== Scottish Parliament election result, 2011 ==
Scottish Parliament election, 2011: Aberdeen Donside
Notes:	Blue background denotes the winner of the electorate vote. Pink background denotes a candidate elected from their party list. Yellow background denotes an electorate win by a list member, or other incumbent. A ✓ or ✗ denotes status of any incumbent, win or lose respectively.						
Party	Candidate	Votes	%	±%	Party votes	%	±%
SNP	✓ Brian Adam	14,790	55.4	+10.6	14,526	54.2	
Labour	Barney Crockett	7,615	28.5	−3.2	6,237	23.3	
Conservative	Ross Thomson	2,166	8.1	+0.6	2,076	7.7	
Liberal Democrats	Millie McLeod	1,606	6.0	−10.0	1,390	5.2	
Green					683	2.5	
All Scotland Pensioners Party					544	2.0	
Socialist Labour					231	0.9	
Scottish Socialist					220	0.8	
UKIP					217	0.8	
Christian Party "Proclaiming Christ's Lordship"					210	0.8	
BNP					177	0.7	
Independent	David Henderson	317	1.2	New	77	0.3	
National Front	Christopher Willett	213	0.8	New	135	0.5	
Independent - John Cox					38	0.1	
Solidarity					17	0.1	
Independent - Andrew McBride					8	0.03	
Angus Independent Representatives					6	0.02	
Total valid votes		26,707			26,792		

== See also ==
- Aberdeen Donside, and its predecessor, Aberdeen North
- Elections in Scotland
- List of by-elections to the Scottish Parliament
