= Minister for Veterans =

Minister for Veterans may refer to:

- Veterans' affairs — general notion
- Minister for Veterans' Affairs, federal office in Australia
  - Minister for Veterans (Victoria)
  - Minister for Veterans (New South Wales)
  - Minister for Veterans (Western Australia)
- Minister for Veterans (France)
- Minister for Veterans (Scotland)
- Minister of State for Veterans' Affairs (United Kingdom)
