= Rachel Annand Taylor =

Scottish poet

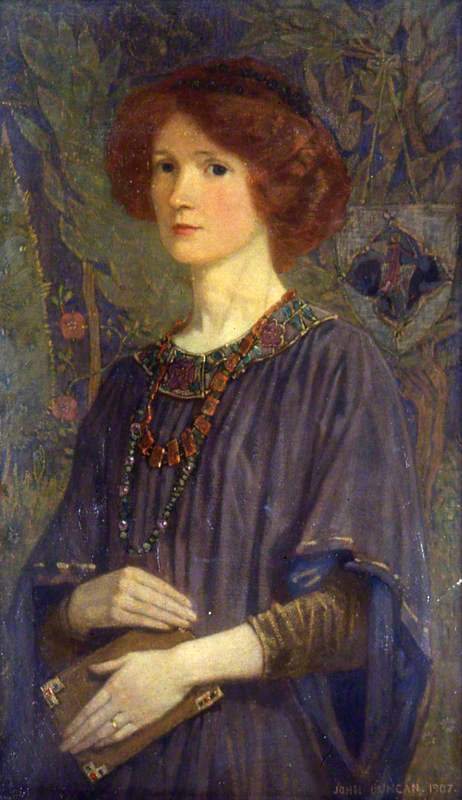
A 1907 portrait by John Duncan in Aberdeen Art Gallery

Rachel Annand Taylor (3 April 1876 – 15 August 1960) was a Scottish poet, prominent in the Celtic Revival, and later a biographer and literary critic.

== Life and work ==
Born in Aberdeen to stonemason John Annand and his wife Clarinda Dinnie, Rachel Annand was one of the first women to study at Aberdeen University, where her tutor was Herbert Grierson. Later she taught at Aberdeen High School for Girls on a site which is now Harlaw Academy and carries a yellow plaque commemorating her. Although she never took her degree, she was awarded an honorary LLD from Aberdeen University in 1943.

Rachel Annand married Alexander C. Taylor in 1901 and lived in Dundee, mixing in Celtic Revival circles. In 1905 they were on the Hebridean island of Eriskay, to which she later devoted a poem. Also resident there at the time was John Duncan, who was to paint her portrait two years later. In this she is standing in front of a tapestry wearing a smock, beads and enamelled jewellery. In her hands is a finely bound book, which may allude to her own first collection of poems, published in 1904.

Her husband's mental illness eventually led to their separation, and by 1910 she was living in Chelsea, London. In that year D. H. Lawrence met her at a literary party and, on being invited later to give a talk to the Croydon branch of the English Association, made her the subject. His audience were not alone in thinking her writing "fantastic decadent stuff". Others too found her arch-vespertine style "cloying", although Richard Aldington, G.K. Chesterton and Hilaire Belloc were among her admirers. In addition Edmund Rubbra set her “Rosa Mundi” as the second of his Two songs for medium voice (op. 2) in 1921.

There is something of the earlier W. B. Yeats, especially in titles such as "The heavenly love is discontented with his lute" and "A soul laments the decay of her body", in her collection Rose and Vine (1909). That was followed by the compact sonnet sequence The Hours of Fiametta (1910), in which a modern critic has detected the even earlier influence of Dante Gabriel Rossetti. Hugh MacDiarmid found promise in the way she dealt with consciously female themes there, but judged that ultimately her insistence on a bygone manner "robbed the Scottish Renaissance of one whose true place should have been at its head". He liked her enough, however, to include two of her poems in the Golden Treasury of Scottish Verse (1940): "The Princess of Scotland" and "Ecstasy”.

A considerable number of her poems had religious themes and were of sufficient quality to be anthologised in The Oxford Book of Mystical Verse (1917). They included "The Immortal Hour", "The Question" and "The Night Obscure of the Soul”. Though many are marked by Pre-Raphaelite mediaevalism, some poems achieved the directness and point of the best of the Metaphysical tradition of religious writing. "The Question" is an outstanding example:

I saw the Son of God go by
Crowned with the crown of Thorn.
"Was it not finished, Lord?” I said,
"And all the anguish borne?”

He turned on me His awful eyes:
"Hast thou not understood?
Lo! Every soul is Calvary,
And every sin a Rood".

Thereafter, Mrs Taylor largely concentrated on the Italian Renaissance studies she published between 1923 and 1930 and on her critical work. She was still living in London when she died in 1960.

== Works ==
- Poems (1904)
- Rose and Vine (1909)
- The Hours of Fiammetta; a sonnet sequence (1910)
- The End of Fiammetta (London 1923; New York 1924)
- Aspects of the Italian Renaissance (1923, reprinted 1968)
- Leonardo the Florentine: A Study in Personality (1927, reprinted in 2003, ISBN 0-7661-4411-9)
- Invitation to Renaissance Italy (1930), a revised and enlarged version of Aspects of the Italian Renaissance
- Dunbar, the Poet and his Period (1931, reprinted 1969)
- Renaissance France (unpublished manuscript, National Library of Scotland)
