= Harlaw =

Harlaw might refer to various things in Scotland:

- The Battle of Harlaw, 24 July 1411, fought near Inverurie
- Harlaw Academy, formerly Aberdeen High School for Girls, Aberdeen
- Harlaw Park, Inverurie, home ground of Inverurie Loco Works F.C.
