= Bogindollo =

Coordinates: 56.687689°N 2.8611096°W

Bogindollo: Scottish Gaelic: Bog an Dalach
- Location within Angus
- OS grid reference: NO473554
- Council area: Angus
- Lieutenancy area: Angus
- Country: Scotland
- Sovereign state: United Kingdom
- Police: Scotland
- Fire: Scottish
- Ambulance: Scottish
- UK Parliament: Angus
- Scottish Parliament: Angus South

Bogindollo (Scots pronunciation: [ˌboɡɪnˈdoɫə]; Scottish Gaelic: Bog an Dalach) is a hamlet in Angus, Scotland, 3.5 miles north of Forfar.

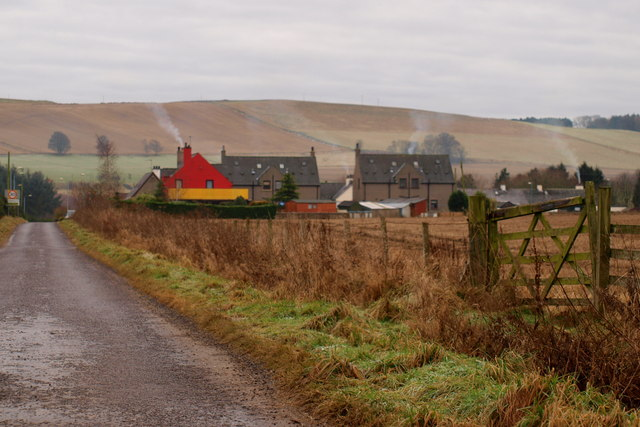
Bogindollo from the north
