= Alex Johnstone (politician) =

Scottish politician (1961–2016)

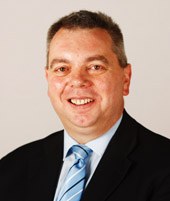

Member of the Scottish Parliament for North East Scotland
- In office 6 May 1999 – 7 December 2016
- Succeeded by: Bill Bowman

Personal details
- Born: 31 July 1961 Stonehaven, Aberdeenshire, Scotland
- Died: 7 December 2016 (aged 55) Stonehaven, Scotland
- Party: Conservative
- Spouse: Linda Anne Johnstone
- Children: 2

Alexander Johnstone (31 July 1961 – 7 December 2016) was a Scottish Conservative politician. He served as a Member of the Scottish Parliament (MSP) for North East Scotland from 1999 until his death in 2016.

== Political career ==
Johnstone had been a Member of the Scottish Parliament for the North East Scotland electoral region since 1999. He fought the West Aberdeenshire and Kincardine constituency in the 2005 general election, finishing second. He also finished second in Angus North and Mearns at the 2011 Scottish Parliament election, but was re-elected as an additional member on the party list. He was the longest serving Conservative MSP of the Scottish Parliament and the last remaining Conservative MSP to have served continuously since the 1999 election. In Holyrood, he had served as Chief Whip and rural affairs spokesman for the Scottish Conservative Party and Shadow Minister for Transport, Infrastructure and Climate Change. In 2016, Johnstone was the party's spokesman for Housing, Transport and Infrastructure. Johnstone was the deputy convenor of the Finance Committee of the Scottish Parliament.

In 2014, Johnstone and his colleague Nanette Milne repaid more than £12,000 to the Scottish Parliament after breaching office expenses rules.

Johnstone, a Church of Scotland elder, made public comments against a proposal to allow individual congregations to select gay clergy for their church. He told the Press and Journal newspaper that a move to allow gay clergy would "ultimately weaken" the church. Johnstone was one of 18 MSPs who voted against same-sex marriage when, in February 2014, the Scottish Parliament backed it.

== Personal life ==
Johnstone was educated at Mackie Academy in Stonehaven before working as a dairy and arable farmer. He married Linda in 1981, and they had two children, Alexander Johnstone (born 1983) and Christine Watson (born 1987).

Johnstone died of cancer on 7 December 2016. Scottish Conservative leader Ruth Davidson called him "a big man with a big heart" who "embodied politics at its best."
