= Bill Bowman (Scottish politician) =

Scottish businessperson and politician (born 1950)

Member of the Scottish Parliament for North East Scotland (1 of 7 Regional MSPs)
- In office 21 December 2016 – 5 May 2021
- Preceded by: Alex Johnstone (Note: Normally, regional MSPs do not have individual predecessors and successors. However, Johnstone died during a sitting parliament so was succeeded by Bowman.)

Personal details
- Born: William Archibald Bowman; 30 May 1950 (age 75) Glasgow, Scotland
- Party: Scottish Conservative
- Education: High School of Glasgow; George Watson's College
- Alma mater: University of Edinburgh
- Profession: Chartered Accountant

William Archibald Bowman (born 30 May 1950) is a Scottish Conservative politician who served as a Member of the Scottish Parliament (MSP) for the North East Scotland region from December 2016 until he stood down at the 2021 election.

Born in Glasgow, Bowman was privately educated at the High School of Glasgow and George Watson's College. He graduated from the University of Edinburgh with a Bachelor of Commerce in 1973 and received accreditation as a chartered accountant in 1976. He subsequently joined accounting firm Peat Marwick, the predecessor of KPMG, working successively in their Edinburgh and Aberdeen offices until 2001. Having secured promotion as Deputy Senior Partner, Bowman moved to Bucharest in 2002, where he engaged with KPMG's operations in Central and Eastern Europe (CEE), with a particular focus on Romania and Moldova.

Leaving KPMG, Bowman returned to the United Kingdom in 2013. He was selected as the Conservative Party candidate for the Dundee East constituency at the 2015 general election, as well as the area's equivalent seat for the Scottish Parliament at the 2016 election, but finished third on both occasions. After the death of Conservative colleague Alex Johnstone in December 2016, Bowman was selected to replace him as an MSP for North East Scotland, having been positioned next on the regional list. Since his accession, he has become the Scottish Conservatives' Spokesperson for Taxation. Bowman has become well known for both his financial interests as well as his membership of various parliamentary committees and groupings.

Bowman was the Conservative prospective parliamentary candidate for North East Fife in the 2024 general election. But came fifth and lost his deposit.

== Early life and career ==
William Archibald Bowman was born in Glasgow on 30 May 1950. He was educated at the private High School of Glasgow and Edinburgh's George Watson's College, the latter from 1961 until 1968. Bowman then went up to the University of Edinburgh, where he graduated Bachelor of Commerce (B.Com.) in 1973.

After accreditation by the Institute of Chartered Accountants of Scotland (ICAS), Bowman qualified as a chartered accountant in 1976. In the same year, he joined the Edinburgh section of Peat Marwick, the predecessor of KPMG, before establishing himself as an early member of the firm's Aberdeen branch in 1981, becoming a partner in 1985. There he remained until 2001, concurrently serving as a director of Aberdeen-based Target Energy Group Ltd between June and September 2000, before moving to Bucharest in 2002. Bowman took up a role as Deputy Senior Partner of KPMG's operations in Romania and Moldova, as well as the wider Central and Eastern Europe (CEE) region, serving on the Supervisory Committee of the latter. Specialising in risk management and ethics, Bowman also served as an elected board member of the Chamber of Financial Auditors of Romania, United Way Romania and the Romanian-American Chamber of Commerce. During this time, he was quoted regularly in the national media, most frequently in Wall-street.ro, an online business publication in Romania.

Leaving KPMG in 2012, Bowman joined the board of Bucharest's UTI Holdings in October of the same year, serving until April 2013. In a declaration of financial interests, he is listed as a shareholder in a wide range of companies, most substantially in Glasgow-based quality assurance firm Tenairvia Consulting Ltd, dissolved in November 2017, for which he owned 100% of shares. Other investments have included stakes in equity firms Simmons Private Equity, Vanguard S&P and Concept Fund Solutions PLC, investment fund Guttmann Investor, oil and gas company Royal Dutch Shell, media organisation ITV, consumer goods producer Unilever and British American Tobacco. Bowman's personal portfolio was quoted by The Courier & Advertiser in September 2018 as "worth more than £600,000".

== Political career ==
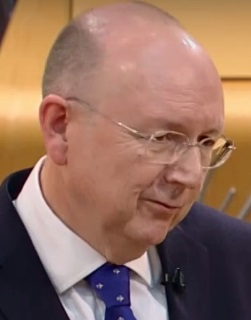
Bowman on the day of his accession to the Scottish Parliament, 21 December 2016

Bowman returned to the United Kingdom later in 2013, settling in Fife. He "took up an active interest in politics" shortly afterwards and was subsequently selected as the Conservative Party candidate for the Dundee East constituency in August 2014 to fight the upcoming general election of the following year. Finishing third, behind incumbent Scottish National Party (SNP) Member of Parliament (MP) Stewart Hosie and Labour's Lesley Brennan, later briefly a Member of the Scottish Parliament (MSP), Bowman captured 7,206 ballots, 15% of the total cast, a small reduction of 0.2% compared with the previous Conservative's vote share. In a contemporary interview with the Financial Times, citing the predicted success of the SNP, Bowman stated: "A lot of people I know are very concerned about the move to the left. The SNP is trying to out-Labour Labour, and Labour is trying to out-Labour itself".

A month later, in June 2015, he was selected to fight the equivalent Scottish Parliament constituency of Dundee City East for the Scottish Conservatives. Despite increasing the party's vote share by 7.6% with 4,969 ballots, Bowman again finished third in the 2016 contest, behind incumbent MSP Shona Robison of the SNP and Labour's Richard McCready. His campaign predominantly advertised job creation, investment in public amenities and a commitment to advocate for the decentralisation of Police Scotland. As of September 2018, he is a permanent resident of the city.

Upon the death of Conservative MSP Alex Johnstone in December 2016, Bowman was selected to replace him as a representative for North East Scotland, having been positioned next on the regional list. He was sworn in as an MSP on 21 December by taking his Oath of Allegiance in the chamber of the Scottish Parliament. Having joined the Economy, Jobs and Fair Work Committee, Bowman soon came under scrutiny by opposition politicians for selling nearly £30,000 worth of British American Tobacco shares on 12 January 2017, with Labour speculating whether he had done so on Scottish Conservatives leader Ruth Davidson's recommendation, perhaps in order to avoid public concern over vested interests. Retorting, the Conservative group highlighted that "[Bowman] has declared his shareholdings openly and in line with procedure, as have many other MSPs." Otherwise unusual for MSPs, he does not claim public funds to maintain a second abode in Edinburgh, the location of the Scottish Parliament, owing to his constituency's relative proximity to the legislature; that said, Bowman attracted further criticism after lodging £1,601 and £13,483 in dining and hotel accommodation expenses, respectively, dating from his accession to September 2018.

Bowman decided not to contest the 2021 elections. On 18 March, his last speech to the legislature addressed the challenges Scottish parliamentarians faced owing to the COVID-19 pandemic, raising concerns over and urging established MSPs to "bring new members on board in what is a much more virtual Parliament these days". He also paid tribute to his late wife, Helen, who died in October 2020 at the age of 70. Members of opposition parties congratulated his service; among them was Willie Rennie, Leader of the Scottish Liberal Democrats, who observed that "he knows he can retire from this place knowing he did his bit for his country".

=== Parliamentary duties ===
Bowman has served as a member of the parliamentary Public Audit and Post-legislative Scrutiny Committee, as well as a substitute member of the Delegated Powers and Law Reform Committee. These duties are combined with his position as the Scottish Conservatives' Spokesperson for Taxation, a duty he has exercised since 28 June 2017. In this capacity, a parliamentary question tabled by Bowman to the Scottish Government in June 2018 first revealed that national business rates were taxing firms £200m more than those operating under English regulations. Bowman is also a constituent of the Cross-Party parliamentary groups on Building Bridges with Israel, Culture, and Scotch Whisky, further serving as Deputy Chair of the Scottish Commission for Public Audit.

== Electoral history ==
=== House of Commons ===
Dundee East shown within Scotland

2015 United Kingdom general election: Dundee East
Party	Candidate	Votes	%	±%
SNP	Stewart Hosie	28,765	59.7	+21.9
Labour	Lesley Brennan	9,603	19.9	−13.4
Conservative	Bill Bowman	7,206	15.0	−0.3
Liberal Democrats	Craig Duncan	1,387	2.9	−7.7
Green	Helen Grayshan	895	1.9	+0.5
CISTA	Lesley Parker-Hamilton	225	0.5	N/A
TUSC	Carlo Morelli	104	0.2	N/A
Majority		19,162	39.8	+34.3
Turnout		48,185	71.0	+9.0
SNP hold		Swing	+17.7	

=== Scottish Parliament ===
Dundee City East shown within the North East Scotland electoral region

2016 Scottish Parliament election: Dundee City East
Party	Candidate	Votes	%	±%
SNP	Shona Robison	16,509	58.1	−6.2
Labour	Richard McCready	5,611	19.7	−3.0
Conservative	Bill Bowman	4,969	17.5	+7.6
Liberal Democrats	Craig Duncan	911	3.2	+0.1
TUSC	Leah Ganley	437	1.5	N/A
Majority		10,898	38.4	−2.9
Turnout		28,437	51.5	+4.1
SNP hold		Swing	−6.1	
