= Pauline Fraser =

Newsreader and journalist for STV North's nightly news programme, North Tonight

Pauline Fraser is a former newsreader and journalist for STV North's nightly news programme, North Tonight.

Fraser attended Harlaw Academy in Aberdeen before graduating from Aberdeen College with an HND degree in journalism. She started her career at Northsound Radio in Aberdeen and after graduating became a senior reporter for weekly newspaper The Deeside Piper.

She joined STV North (then known as Grampian Television) in January 2000 as a news reporter & presenter and also presented three series' of feature series The People Show (alongside Chris Harvey), as well as a lifestyle programme called Spend, Spend, Spend.

Fraser left STV on 26 June 2007 after seven years. She now runs a Media Communication & Production company called Frasermedia Ltd.
