= Lloyd Melville =

Scottish politician

Lloyd Melville MSP
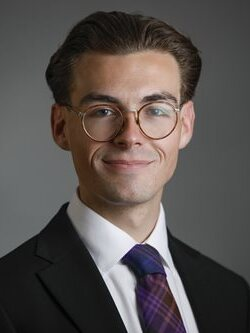
- Official Portrait, 2026

Member of the Scottish Parliament for Angus South
- Incumbent
- Assumed office 7 May 2026
- Preceded by: Graeme Dey
- Majority: 6,608 (21.1%)

Personal details
- Party: Scottish National Party

Lloyd Melville is a Scottish politician serving as an MSP for Angus South since 2026. Melville was a member of the Scottish Nationalist group while attending University of Stirling.

== Political career ==
Prior to his election to the Scottish Parliament, Melville was an SNP candidate for Monifieth and Sidlaw ward in the 2022 Angus Council election and was elected in the first count. Lloyd Melville is a member of Angus Council. In June 2025, he was selected as the SNP's candidate for Angus South in the 2026 Scottish Parliament election, selected to succeed Graeme Dey.

Scottish Parliament
| Preceded by Graeme Dey | Member of the Scottish Parliament for Angus South; 2026–present | Incumbent |
