= UTI Holdings =

Holding company in Romania

- Type: private
- Industry: IT, Construction, Military, Services
- Founded: 1990
- Headquarters: Bucharest, Romania
- Key people: Tiberiu Urdăreanu, CEO
- Revenue: US$ 200 million (2007)
- Number of employees: 2,700 (2007)
- Website: http://www.uti.ro/

UTI Holdings is a large holding company in Romania structured in four divisions:

- security and defence systems,
- information technology and communications,
- installations and constructions
- facility management.
