= Nanette Milne =

Scottish Conservative Party politician (born 1942)

Nanette Milne OBE
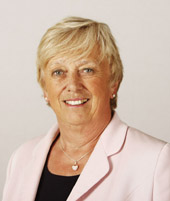

Member of the Scottish Parliament for North East Scotland
- In office 1 May 2003 – 24 March 2016

Personal details
- Born: 27 April 1942 (age 84) Aberdeen, Scotland
- Party: Scottish Conservative Party
- Education: University of Aberdeen

Nanette Lilian Margaret Milne OBE (born 27 April 1942) is a former Scottish Conservative Party politician. She served as a Member of the Scottish Parliament (MSP) for North East Scotland from 2003 to 2016.

== Early life and education ==
Milne was born in Aberdeen on 27 April 1942. Her parents were Hannah L. C. Gordon (née Stephen) and Harold G. Gordon. She was brought up in Aberdeen’s Woodside. She attended the Aberdeen High School for Girls, going on to study medicine at the University of Aberdeen graduating with an MBChB in 1965.

== Career ==
She married Alan Milne in 1965, and together they had two children. In the 1970s she took a break from her profession to raise her children. After her break she worked part-time on cancer research.

=== Politics ===
Milne joined the Conservative Party in 1974. She originally started as a grassroots activist, she then moved on to the committee of her local branch. She then became Chair of her constituency association, and from 1989 to 1993 was Vice-Chair of the Scottish Conservative Party.

She stood for election to the Scottish Parliament in Aberdeen South in 1999. She then stood for the Westminster seat of Gordon in the 2001 UK general election and then stood for Gordon again in the 2003 Scottish Parliament elections where she came second to the Liberal Democrats and increased the Conservatives’ share of the vote.

She was elected as one of three North East Conservative list MSPs. In February 2005 she was promoted to Conservative spokesman for Health and Community Care.

From 1988 to 1999, Milne was elected to Aberdeen City Council for the Cults ward. For eight years, she was a member of the Council’s Planning Committee and became a founder trustee of the Aberdeen Countryside Project. She was involved in Aberdeen International Youth Festival as a trustee, supporter and "Friend" of the festival. She also became a trustee of the Aberdeen-Gomel Trust, formed after the Chernobyl disaster, and remains an active member of the Friends of Gomel.

Milne served as a governor on the University of Aberdeen Court, and she spearheaded the formation of an informal Alumnus group of Aberdeen graduates that work within the Scottish Parliament.

Milne stood in the Gordon constituency for the 2007 Scottish elections. She came third, behind the SNP's Alex Salmond and the Liberal Democrats Nora Radcliffe. She was elected as a member on the Regional list for the North East region. She did not stand for re-election in 2016.
