= Aberdeen Donside =

Constituency of the Scottish Parliament

- Burgh constituency for the Scottish Parliament
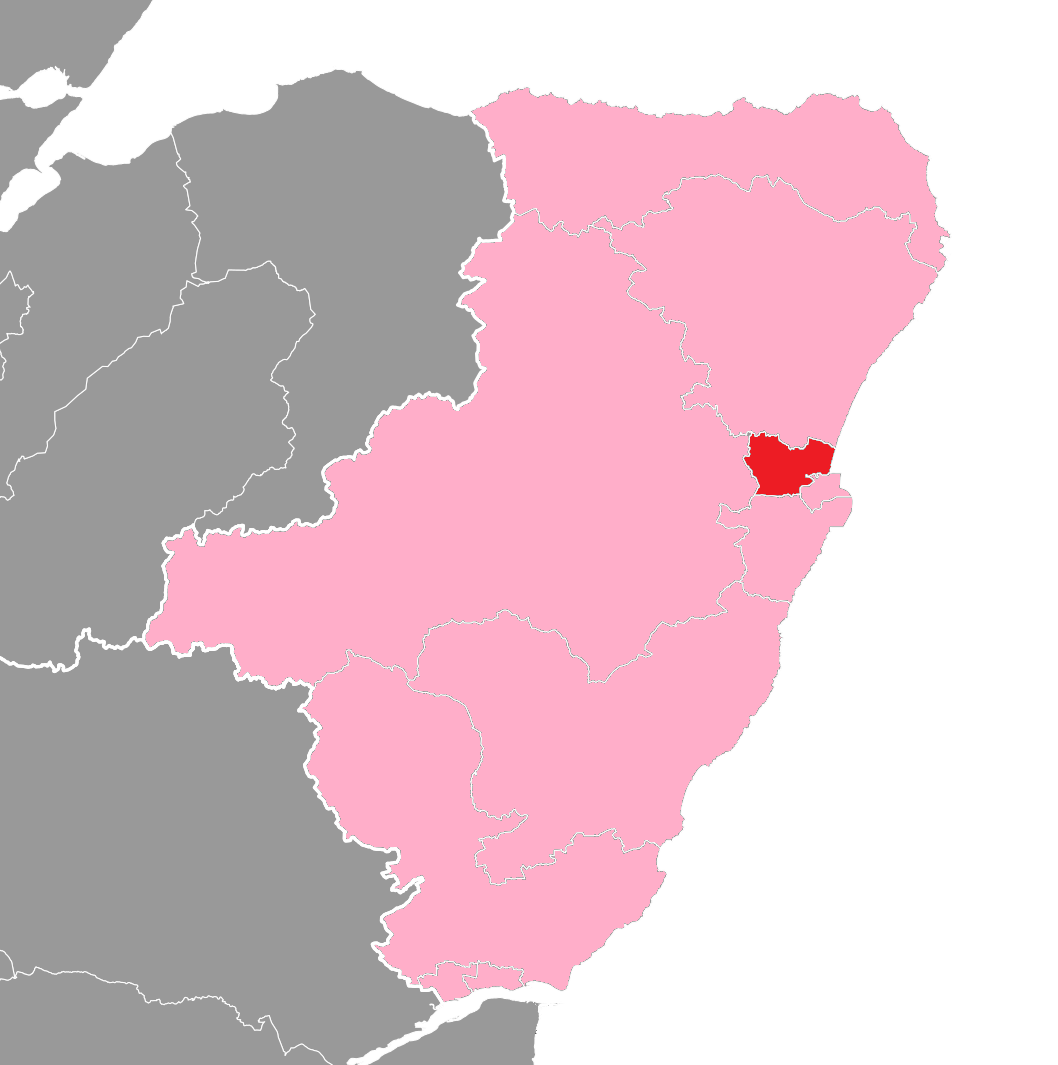

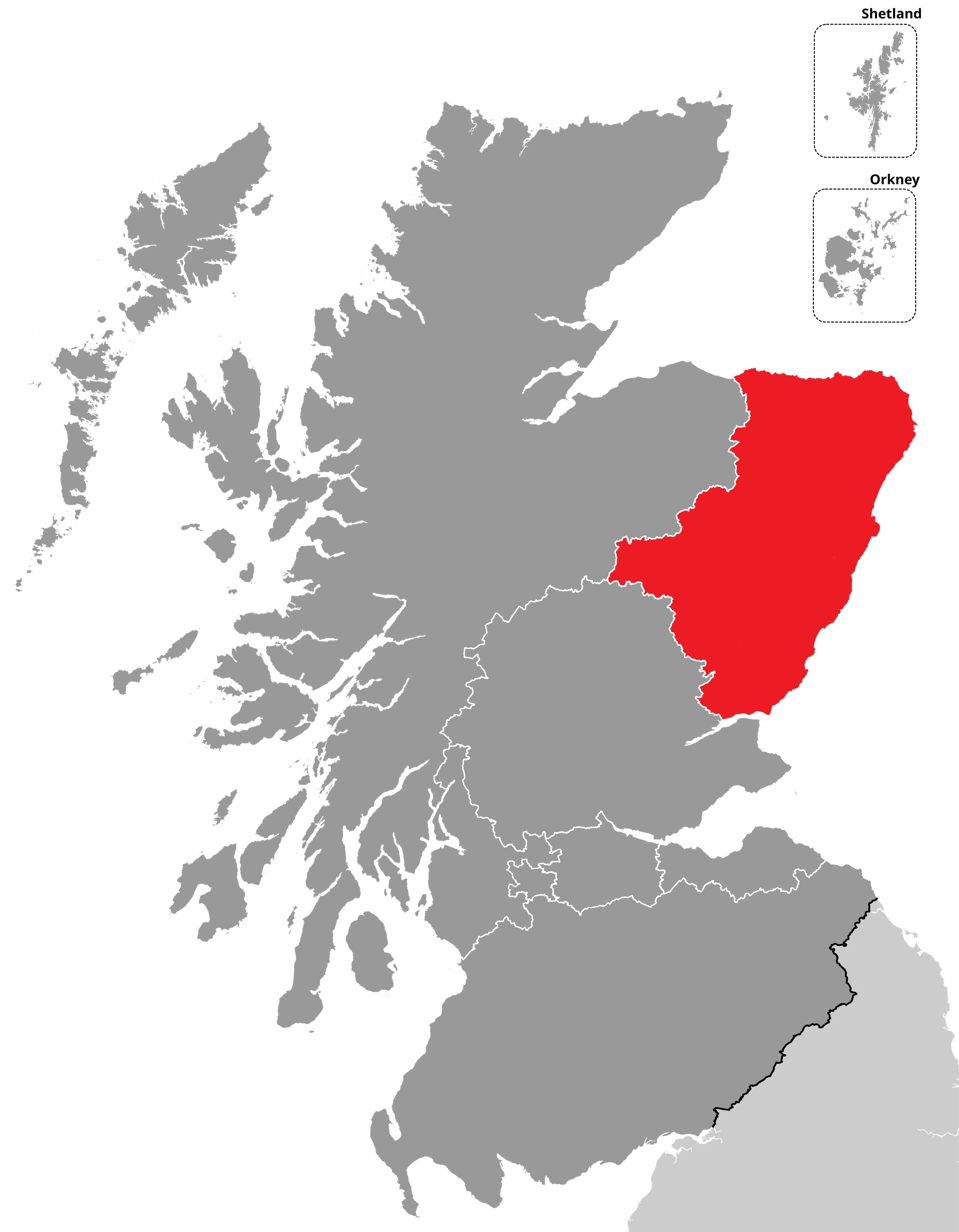
- Aberdeen Donside shown within the North East Scotland electoral region and the region shown within Scotland
- Electoral region: North East Scotland
- Electorate: 64,289 (2026)

Current constituency
- Created: 2011
- Party: SNP
- MSP: Jackie Dunbar
- Council area: Aberdeen City
- Created from: Aberdeen Central, Aberdeen North

Aberdeen Donside (Gaelic: Obar Dheathain Oir Dheathain) is a burgh constituency of the Scottish Parliament covering part of the Aberdeen City council area. Under the additional-member electoral system used for elections to the Scottish Parliament, it elects one Member of the Scottish Parliament (MSP) by the first past the post method of election. It is one of ten constituencies in the North East Scotland electoral region, which elects seven additional members, in addition to the ten constituency MSPs, to produce a form of proportional representation for the region as a whole.

The seat has been held by Jackie Dunbar of the Scottish National Party since the 2021 Scottish Parliament election.

== Electoral region ==
The other nine constituencies of the North East Scotland region are: Aberdeen Central, Aberdeen Deeside and North Kincardine, Aberdeenshire East, Aberdeenshire West, Angus North and Mearns, Angus South, Banffshire and Buchan Coast, Dundee City East and Dundee City West. The region covers all of the Aberdeen City council area, the Aberdeenshire council area, the Angus council area, the Dundee City council area and part of the Moray council area.

== Constituency boundaries and council area ==
Boundary map of the constituency

Following the first periodic review of Scottish Parliament boundaries, the Boundary Commission for Scotland created three new seats for the Aberdeen City council area. The council area is now divided between three constituencies: Aberdeen Central, Aberdeen Donside and Aberdeen South and North Kincardine. Central and Donside are entirely within the Aberdeen City council area, while South and North Kincardine also takes in North Kincardine in the Aberdeenshire council area. For the 2026 Scottish Parliament election Aberdeen South and North Kincardine will be renamed as Aberdeen Deeside and North Kincardine, whilst retaining its current boundaries; the change of name was implemented at the second periodic review of Scottish Parliament boundaries to maintain consistency with the naming of the Aberdeen Donside seat.

Aberdeen Donside covers the northern part of the city council area, and comprises the following wards of Aberdeen City Council:

- In full:
  - Dyce/Bucksburn/Danestone
  - Bridge of Don
  - Kingswells/Sheddocksley/Summerhill
  - Northfield/Mastrick North
- In part:
  - Hilton/Woodside/Stockethill (shared with Aberdeen Central)

At the second periodic review of Scottish Parliament boundaries in 2025 the seat boundaries were left unchanged, and the seat continues to be formed of the same wards as at the first periodic review.

== Member of the Scottish Parliament ==
Election	Member	Party
2011	Brian Adam (Note: Incumbent for Aberdeen North constituency since 2003.)	Scottish National Party
2013 by-election	Mark McDonald	Scottish National Party
2017	Mark McDonald	Independent
2021	Jackie Dunbar	Scottish National Party

== Election results ==
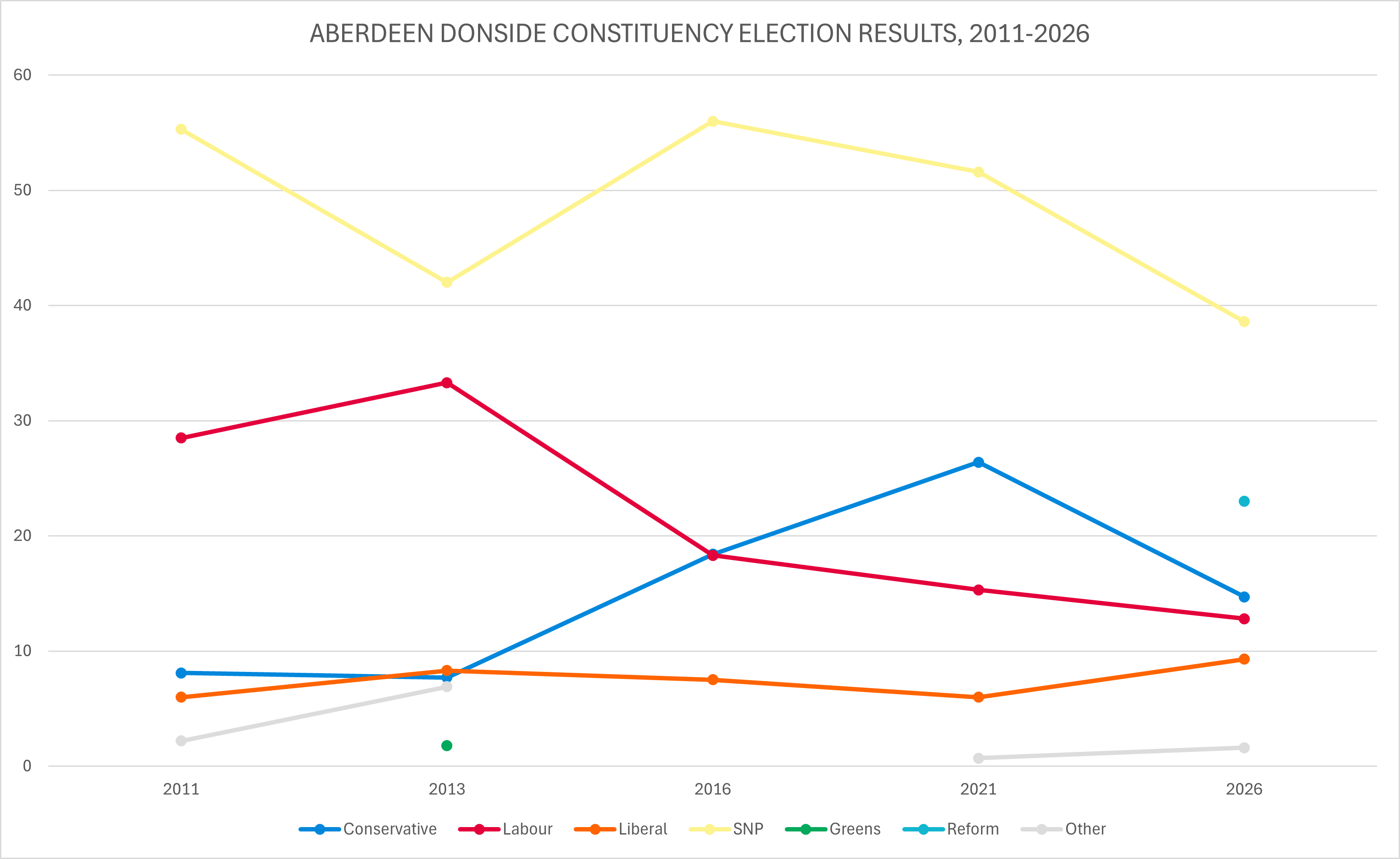
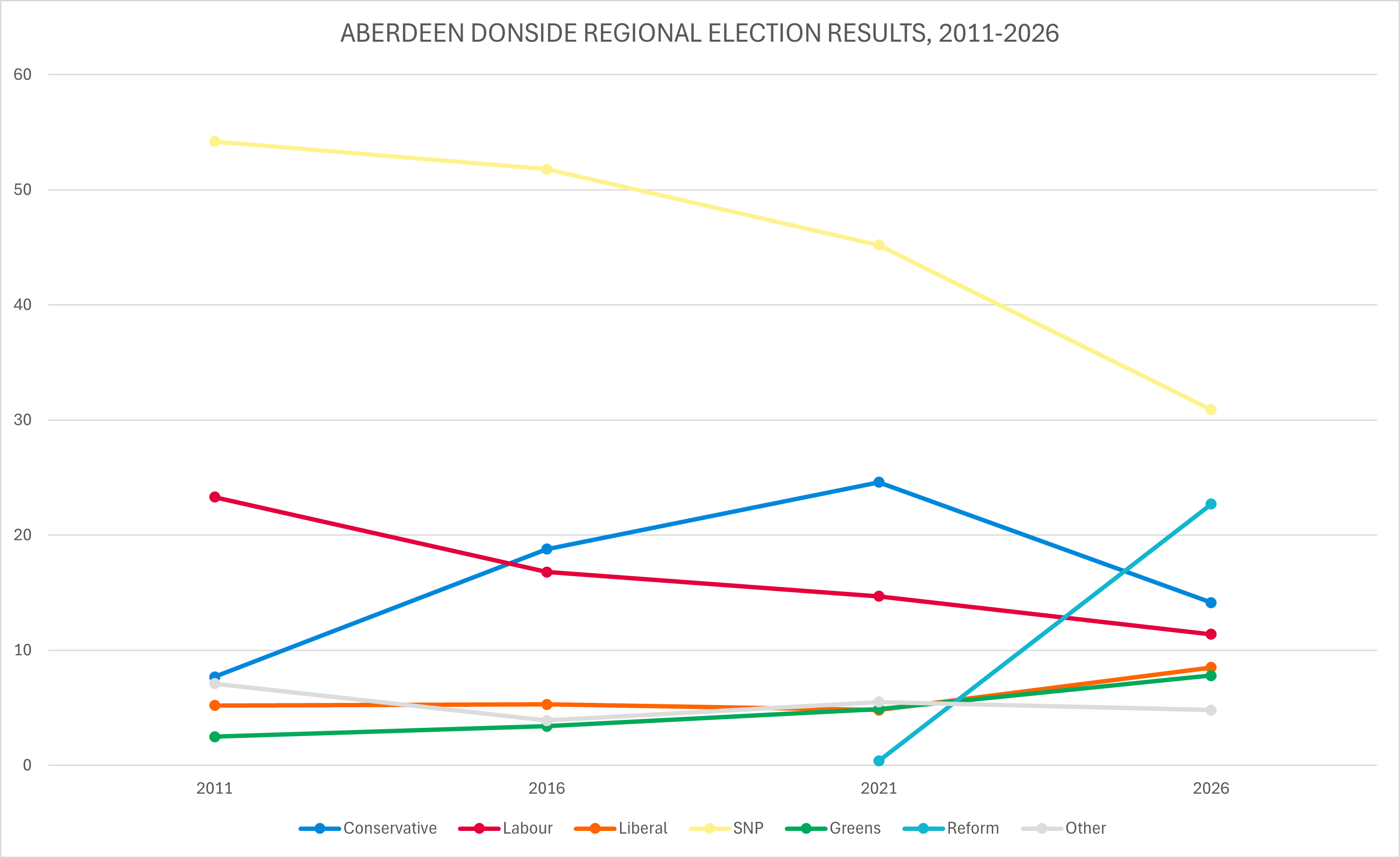

=== 2020s ===
==== 2026 ====
2026 Scottish Parliament election: Aberdeen Donside
Party	Candidate	Constituency			Regional		
Party	Candidate	Votes	%	±%	Votes	%	±%
SNP	Jackie Dunbar (Note: Incumbent member for this constituency)	11,760	38.6	▼13.0	9,450	30.86	▼14.34
Reform	Claudia Leith	7,029	23.1	New	6,955	22.71	▲22.31
Conservative	Hannah Powell	4,496	14.7	▼11.7	4,329	14.14	▼10.46
Labour	Lynn Thomson	3,907	12.8	▼2.5	3,481	11.37	▼3.33
Liberal Democrats	Michael Turvey	2,823	9.3	▲3.3	2,601	8.49	▲3.69
Green					2,387	7.79	▲2.89
Scottish Family					326	1.06	▲0.26
AtLS	Stephen Bowie	481	1.6	New	298	0.97	New
Independent Green Voice					210	0.69	▲0.19
ISP					176	0.57	New
Independent	Marie Boulton				126	0.41	New
Workers Party					116	0.38	New
Scottish Socialist					85	0.28	New
Advance UK					55	0.18	New
Independent	Iris Leask				29	0.09	New
Majority		4,731	15.5	▼9.7			
Valid votes		30,496			30,624		
Invalid votes		113			73		
Turnout		30,609	47.6	▼10.4	30,697	47.7	▼10.3
SNP hold		Swing					

==== 2021 ====
2021 Scottish Parliament election: Aberdeen Donside
Party	Candidate	Constituency			Regional		
Party	Candidate	Votes	%	±%	Votes	%	±%
SNP	Jackie Dunbar	18,514	51.6	▼4.4	16,233	45.2	▼6.6
Conservative	Harriet Cross	9,488	26.4	▲8.0	8,849	24.6	▲5.8
Labour	Heather Herbert	5,505	15.3	▼3.0	5,283	14.7	▼2.1
Green					1,764	4.9	▲1.5
Liberal Democrats	Isobel Davidson	2,162	6.0	▼1.5	1,728	4.8	▼0.5
Alba					743	2.1	New
Scottish Family					269	0.8	New
All for Unity					255	0.7	New
TUSC	Lucas Grant	240	0.7	New			
Independent Green Voice					177	0.5	New
Abolish the Scottish Parliament					134	0.4	New
Reform					126	0.4	New
Freedom Alliance (UK)					109	0.3	New
Restore Scotland					85	0.2	New
UKIP					71	0.2	▼2.0
Scottish Libertarian					64	0.2	0.0
Independent	Laura Marshall				39	0.1	New
Independent	Geoffrey Farquharson				15	0.0	New
Renew					7	0.0	New
Majority		9,026	25.2	▼12.4			
Valid votes		35,909			35,951		
Invalid votes		118			80		
Turnout		36,027	58.0	▲7.2	36,031	58.0	▲7.2
SNP hold		Swing		▼6.2			

=== 2010s ===
2016 Scottish Parliament election: Aberdeen Donside (Note: Changes shown are relative to 2011 election)
Party	Candidate	Constituency			Regional		
Party	Candidate	Votes	%	±%	Votes	%	±%
SNP	Mark McDonald (Note: Incumbent member for this constituency)	17,339	56.0	▲0.7	16,080	51.8	▼2.4
Conservative	Liam Kerr	5,709	18.4	▲10.3	5,825	18.8	▲11.0
Labour	Greg Williams	5,672	18.3	▼10.1	5,208	16.8	▼6.5
Liberal Democrats	Isobel Davidson	2,261	7.5	▲1.5	1,653	5.3	▲0.1
Green					1,046	3.4	▲0.8
UKIP					675	2.2	▲1.4
Scottish Christian					226	0.7	▼0.1
National Front					106	0.3	▼0.2
Solidarity					72	0.2	▲0.2
Scottish Libertarian					57	0.2	New
RISE					55	0.2	New
Communist					37	0.1	New
Majority		11,630	37.6	▲12.8			
Valid votes		30,981			31,040		
Invalid votes		117			52		
Turnout		31,098	50.8	▲3.0	31,092	50.8	
SNP hold		Swing		▼5.5			
Notes

Aberdeen Donside By-Election, 20 June 2013
Party	Candidate	Votes	%	±%
SNP	Mark McDonald	9,814	42.0	▼13.4
Labour	Willie Young	7,789	33.3	▲4.8
Liberal Democrats	Christine Jardine	1,940	8.3	▲2.3
Conservative	Ross Thomson	1,791	7.7	▲0.4
UKIP	Otto Inglis	1,128	4.8	New
Green	Rhonda Reekie	410	1.8	New
National Front	Dave MacDonald	249	1.1	▲0.3
Scottish Christian	Tom Morrow	222	0.9	New
SDA	James Trolland	35	0.1	New
Majority		2,025	8.7	▼18.1
Turnout		23,396	38.8	▼9.0
SNP hold		Swing	▼5.5	

2011 Scottish Parliament election: Aberdeen Donside (Note: Changes shown are relative to the notional result for 2007)
Party	Candidate	Constituency			Region		
Party	Candidate	Votes	%	±%	Votes	%	±%
SNP	Brian Adam (Note: Incumbent member on the party list, or for another constituency)	14,790	55.3	▲10.5	14,526	54.2	N/A
Labour	Barney Crockett	7,615	28.5	▼3.2	6,237	23.3	N/A
Conservative	Ross Thomson	2,166	8.1	▲0.6	2,076	7.7	N/A
Liberal Democrats	Millie McLeod	1,606	6.0	▼10.0	1,390	5.2	N/A
Green					683	2.5	N/A
All-Scotland Pensioners Party					544	2.0	N/A
Independent	David Henderson	371	1.4	New	TBC (Note: Included as part of "Others")		N/A
Socialist Labour					231	0.9	N/A
Scottish Socialist					220	0.8	N/A
UKIP					217	0.8	N/A
Scottish Christian					210	0.8	N/A
BNP					177	0.7	N/A
National Front	Christopher Willett	213	0.8	New	135	0.5	N/A
Solidarity					17	0.1	N/A
Angus Independents					6	0.0	N/A
Others					123	0.5	N/A
Majority		7,175	26.8	▲13.7			
Valid votes		26,761			26,792		
Invalid votes		84			96		
Turnout		26,845	47.8	N/A	26,888	47.9	N/A
SNP win (new seat)							

=== 2000s ===
The following is the notional result for the 2007 Scottish Parliament election, as calculated by the BBC.

Scottish Parliament election, 2007 Notional Result: Aberdeen Donside
Party	Candidate	Votes	%	±%
SNP		12,165	44.8	
Labour		8,614	31.7	
Liberal Democrats		4,340	16.0	
Conservative		2,027	7.5	
Majority		3,551	13.1	
SNP hold		Swing		

== Politics and history of the constituency ==
The area contains Aberdeen Airport (run by BAA),

Prior to the 2011 election, the Liberal Democrat candidate (Cllr Gordon Leslie), stood down amid allegations related to prostitution.

== See also ==
- 2013 Aberdeen Donside by-election
- Aberdeen City Youth Council

== See also ==
- List of Scottish Parliament constituencies and electoral regions (2026–)
