= Minister for Veterans (Scotland) =

Ministerial post in Scotland

- Scottish Gaelic: Ministear airson Seann Shaighdearan
- Style: Minister (within parliament); Veterans Minister (informal); Scottish Veterans Minister (outwith Scotland)
- Member of: Scottish Parliament; Scottish Government
- Reports to: Scottish Parliament
- Seat: Edinburgh
- Appointer: First Minister
- Inaugural holder: Graeme Dey (Minister for Parliamentary Business and Veterans)
- Formation: 27 June 2018
- Salary: £106,185 per annum (2024) (including £72,196 MSP salary)
- Website: www.gov.scot

The Minister for Veterans is a junior ministerial post in the Scottish Government. As a result, the Minister does not attend the Scottish Cabinet. The post was created in March 2023 after the appointment of the Humza Yousaf as First Minister of Scotland.

== Ministers ==
=== Minister for Parliamentary Business and Veterans ===
Name	Portrait	Entered office	Left office	Party	First Minister
Graeme Dey		27 June 2018	20 May 2021	Scottish National Party	Nicola Sturgeon
=== Cabinet Secretary for Justice and Veterans ===
Name	Portrait	Entered office	Left office	Party	First Minister
Keith Brown		20 May 2021	29 March 2023	Scottish National Party	Nicola Sturgeon
=== Minister for Veterans ===
Name	Portrait	Entered office	Left office	Party	First Minister
Graeme Dey		29 March 2023	Incumbent	Scottish National Party	Humza Yousaf; John Swinney

== See also ==
- Scottish Parliament
- Scottish Government
