= Graeme Dey =

Scottish politician (born 1962)

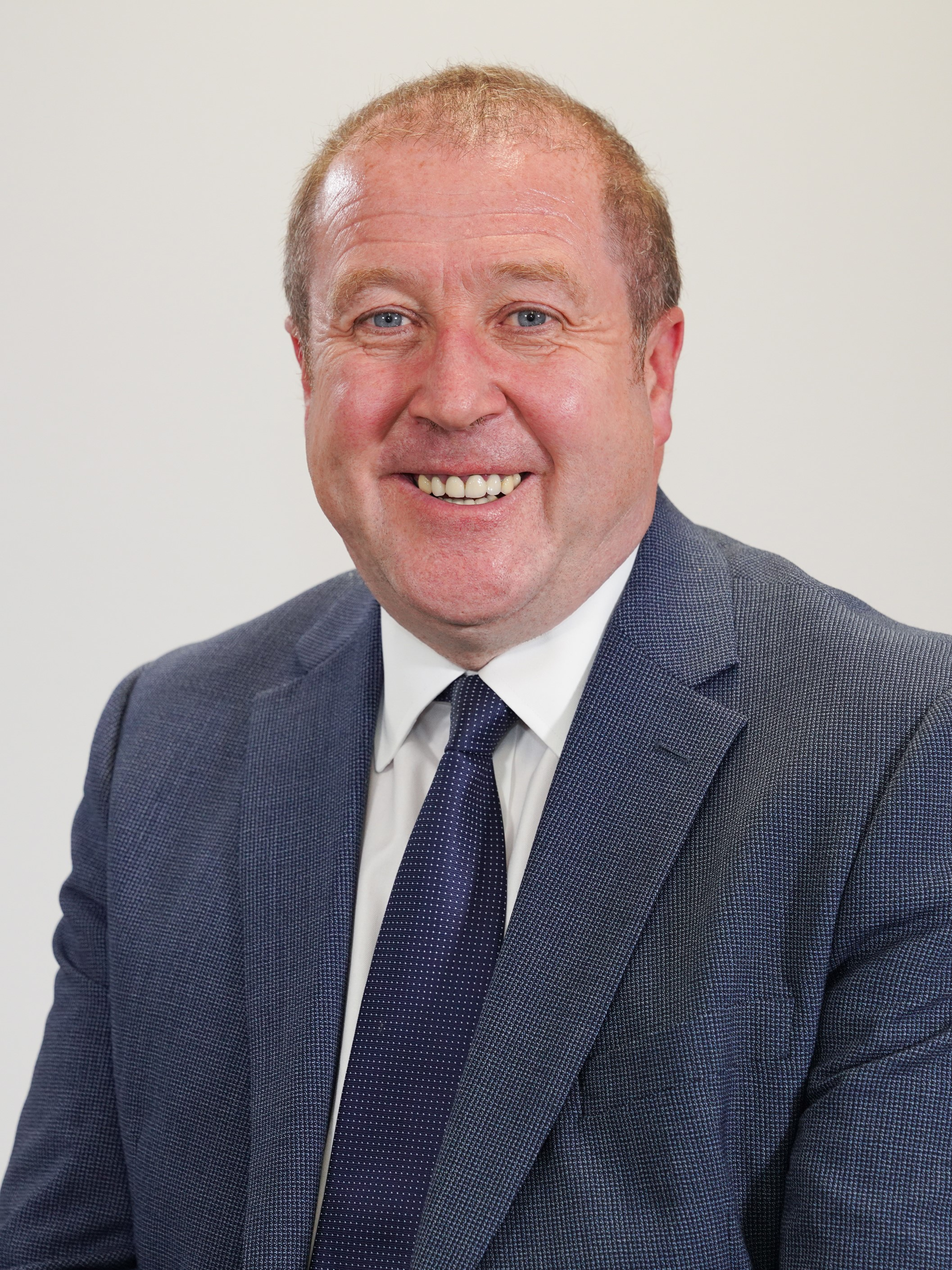
- Official portrait, 2021

Minister for Parliamentary Business (Note: Post was titled Minister for Parliamentary Business and Veterans from 2018 to 2021)
- In office 21 September 2025 – 20 May 2026
- First Minister: John Swinney
- Preceded by: Jamie Hepburn
- Succeeded by: Jamie Hepburn
- In office 27 June 2018 – 20 May 2021
- First Minister: Nicola Sturgeon
- Preceded by: Joe FitzPatrick
- Succeeded by: George Adam

Minister for Veterans
- In office 29 March 2023 – 20 May 2026
- First Minister: Humza Yousaf; John Swinney
- Preceded by: Keith Brown (Note: Veterans remit previously part of Cabinet Secretary for Justice as Cabinet Secretary for Justice and Veterans)
- Succeeded by: Jamie Hepburn (Note: Post merged again with Minister for Parliamentary Business to form Minister for Parliamentary Business & Veterans)

Minister for Higher and Further Education
- In office 29 March 2023 – 21 September 2025
- First Minister: Humza Yousaf; John Swinney
- Preceded by: Jamie Hepburn
- Succeeded by: Ben Macpherson

Minister for Transport
- In office 20 May 2021 – 24 January 2022
- Preceded by: Paul Wheelhouse
- Succeeded by: Jenny Gilruth

Member of the Scottish Parliament for Angus South
- In office 6 May 2011 – 9 April 2026
- Preceded by: Constituency established
- Succeeded by: Lloyd Melville

Personal details
- Born: 29 October 1962 (age 63) Aberdeen, Scotland
- Party: Scottish National Party

Graeme James Dey (born 29 October 1962) is a Scottish politician who served as the Minister for Parliamentary Business in the Scottish Government between 2025 and 2026, alongside being the Minister for Veterans between 2023 and 2026, having previously served in a combined role as Minister for Parliamentary Business and Veterans from 2018 to 2021. He also served as Minister for Transport from 2021 to 2022. A member of the Scottish National Party (SNP), he was Member of the Scottish Parliament (MSP) for Angus South from 2011 to 2026.

== Career ==
Dey is a journalist, having worked for DC Thomson since 1980 and serving as sports editor of The Courier. From 2001 to 2017, he served as MP Mike Weir's election agent, managing successful campaigns in 2001, 2005, and 2010.

At the 2011 Scottish Parliament election, Dey was elected as MSP for Angus South with 16,164 votes (58.5% of total), a 38.3% majority. He served as Deputy Convener of the Parliament's Rural Affairs, Climate Change and Environment (RACCE) Committee during its scrutiny of the Land Reform Bill 2015. Dey was re-elected in 2016. On 27 June 2018, he was appointed as Minister for Parliamentary Business and Veterans, a junior post in Nicola Sturgeon's Scottish Government.

After the election in May 2021, he was appointed on 20 May 2021 as Minister for Transport. In January 2022, Dey tendered his resignation as Transport Minister for health reasons. In 2023, he was appointed Minister for Higher and Further Education and Minister for Veterans in the Yousaf government. In February 2025, Dey announced he would not seek re-election at the 2026 Scottish Parliament election.

In September 2025, Dey was appointed the Minister for Parliamentary Business by First Minister John Swinney, following the resignation of Jamie Hepburn.

== Notes ==
Scottish Parliament
New constituency	Member of the Scottish Parliament for Angus South; 2011–2026	Incumbent
