= Elaine Thomson =

Scottish politician (born 1957)

Member of the Scottish Parliament for Aberdeen North
- In office 6 May 1999 – 31 March 2003
- Preceded by: New Parliament
- Succeeded by: Brian Adam

Personal details
- Born: 1957 (age 68–69) Inverness, Scotland
- Party: Scottish Labour Party

Elaine Thomson (born 1957 in Inverness) is a former Scottish Labour Party politician. She was the Member of the Scottish Parliament (MSP) for the Aberdeen North constituency from 1999 to 2003.

In the 2003 election she was defeated by Brian Adam of the Scottish National Party (SNP). After her defeat she returned to work with her previous employer, an Aberdeen-based IT consultancy.

Thomson stood again in Aberdeen North at the 2007 Scottish Parliamentary election but again lost to Brian Adam by an increased majority.

Scottish Parliament
New parliament Scotland Act 1998	Member of the Scottish Parliament for Aberdeen North; 1999–2003	Succeeded by Brian Adam
