= Brian Adam =

Scottish politician (1948–2013)

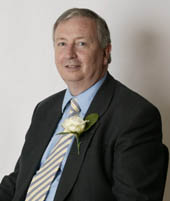
- Official portrait, 2007

Minister for Parliamentary Business and Chief Whip
- In office 25 May 2011 – 6 September 2012
- First Minister: Alex Salmond
- Preceded by: Bruce Crawford
- Succeeded by: Joe Fitzpatrick

Member of the Scottish Parliament for Aberdeen Donside Aberdeen North (2003–2011)
- In office 1 May 2003 – 25 April 2013
- Preceded by: Elaine Thomson
- Succeeded by: Mark McDonald

Member of the Scottish Parliament for North East Scotland
- In office 6 May 1999 – 31 March 2003

Personal details
- Born: 10 June 1948 Newmill, near Keith, Moray, Scotland
- Died: 25 April 2013 (aged 64) Aberdeen, Scotland
- Party: Scottish National Party
- Spouse: Dorothy
- Children: 5
- Education: University of Aberdeen
- Profession: Biochemist, Trade Union Activist

Brian James Adam (10 June 1948 – 25 April 2013) was a Scottish politician and biochemist who served as Minister for Parliamentary Business and Chief Whip from 2011 to 2012. A member of the Scottish National Party (SNP), he was a Member of the Scottish Parliament (MSP) from 1999 to 2013.

He was an MSP for the North East Scotland region from 1999 to 2003, then for the Aberdeen North constituency from 2003 to 2011, and for the Aberdeen Donside constituency from 2011 until his death in 2013. From 2007 to 2011, he was Chief Whip for the minority SNP Government and Co-Convener of the Oil and Gas Cross Party Group.

== Early life ==
=== Education and career ===
Brian James Adam was born on 10 June 1948 in Newmill, Moray. He attended Keith Grammar School and obtained a BSc (Hons) in Biochemistry and a MSc in Clinical Pharmacology from the University of Aberdeen.

He began his career with Glaxo in Montrose, Angus from 1970 to 1973, before working as a biochemist at City Hospital, Aberdeen from 1973 to 1988. From 1988, Adam worked as the principal biochemist in the National Health Service at Aberdeen Royal Infirmary.

=== Early political years ===
Adam joined the Scottish National Party (SNP) in 1974 and he was a trade union activist prior to his election to Holyrood in 1999. He served three terms as a councillor for Middlefield and Heathryfold on Aberdeen District Council from 1988 to 1996 and on Aberdeen City Council from 1995 until 1999.

He stood as a candidate for the Aberdeen North constituency at the 1997 general election for the House of Commons but Labour retained the seat with a majority of 10,000 votes.

== Member of the Scottish Parliament ==
In the first election to the Scottish Parliament in 1999, he contested Aberdeen North. Labour won the seat with a narrow majority of just 398 votes. Adam was elected from the regional list as the second North East Scotland regional MSP in 1999.

At the 2003 election he stood for the Aberdeen North constituency, this time winning the seat from Labour with a majority of 457 votes.

He retained the seat at the 2007 election with a significantly increased majority of 3,749 votes, and then again in 2011 in the renamed Aberdeen Donside with an even larger majority of 7,175 votes.

== Personal life ==
Adam lived in Aberdeen with his wife Dorothy. He had five children and three grandchildren. He was an active member of the Church of Jesus Christ of Latter-day Saints (LDS Church). Adam was also follower of Aberdeen Football Club and attended the majority of their matches.

== Death and legacy ==
Adam died of cancer on 25 April 2013 after struggling with a long illness, Then-First Minister Alex Salmond paid tribute to Adam as "an outstanding politician, fine human being and a dear friend."

In 2022, a bypass road completed that year as an alternative route to the Haudagain roundabout was named Brian Adam Road in his honour.

== Spokesperson posts ==
- May 1999 to September 2000 – Deputy Whip
- September 2000 to April 2003 – Deputy Business Manager & Deputy Chief Whip
- May 2003 to September 2004 – Deputy Party Spokesperson on Education & Lifelong Learning
- September 2004 – Deputy Party Spokesperson on Tourism

== Parliamentary posts ==
In June 2003 he became the Convener of the Standards Committee.

- May 2007 – Chief Whip
- May 2011 – September 2012 − Minister for Parliamentary Business and Chief Whip

== See also ==
- Government of the 4th Scottish Parliament

Scottish Parliament
Preceded by Elaine Thomson	Member of the Scottish Parliament for Aberdeen North; 2003–2011	Constituency abolished
New constituency	Member of the Scottish Parliament for Aberdeen Donside; 2011-2013	Succeeded by Mark McDonald
