= Mark McDonald (politician) =

Former member of the Scottish Parliament

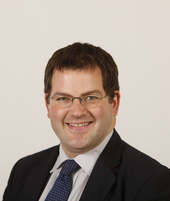

Minister for Childcare and Early Years
- In office 18 May 2016 – 4 November 2017
- First Minister: Nicola Sturgeon
- Preceded by: Aileen Campbell
- Succeeded by: Maree Todd

Member of the Scottish Parliament for Aberdeen Donside
- In office 20 June 2013 – 5 May 2021
- Preceded by: Brian Adam
- Succeeded by: Jackie Dunbar
- Majority: 11,630

Member of the Scottish Parliament for North East Scotland (1 of 7 Regional MSPs)
- In office 5 May 2011 – 14 May 2013
- Succeeded by: Christian Allard

Personal details
- Born: 7 June 1980 (age 46) Inverurie, Aberdeenshire, Scotland
- Party: Independent (2018–)
- Other political affiliations: Scottish National Party (until 2018)
- Spouse: Louise (separated)
- Children: 1 son, 1 daughter
- Education: University of Dundee; University of Aberdeen

Mark McDonald (born 7 June 1980) is a Scottish politician who was the Member of the Scottish Parliament (MSP) for the Aberdeen Donside constituency from 2013 to 2021, having previously represented the North East Scotland region between 5 May 2011 and 14 May 2013. Formerly a Scottish National Party politician and Minister for Childcare and Early Years in the Scottish Government, he was suspended by the SNP in November 2017 following allegations of inappropriate behaviour against several women. Following a party investigation, the claims were substantiated, McDonald issued an apology on 6 March 2018, announcing he had now left the SNP and would sit in the Scottish Parliament as an independent.

== Education and early career ==
McDonald was educated at Dyce Primary School and Dyce Academy. He gained an MA in Politics from the University of Dundee (2002) and an MLitt in Strategic Studies from the University of Aberdeen (2003). From 2003 to 2011 he worked as a Parliamentary Assistant to MSPs Richard Lochhead, Maureen Watt, and Nigel Don. In 2004, he unsuccessfully contested a Local Authority by-election. He stood as the SNP candidate for Aberdeen South in the 2010 UK general election coming fourth in the poll.

== Political career ==
=== Aberdeen City Council ===
McDonald was elected to Aberdeen City Council in 2007 at the age of 26 representing the Dyce/Bucksburn/Danestone ward. Twelve days later his colleagues elected him as vice-convener of the housing and environment committee and he was appointed the deputy leader of the SNP group on the council.

=== Scottish Parliament ===
McDonald was elected to the Scottish Parliament in the 2011 election from the North East Scotland regional list with the SNP taking 52.71% of the vote. As the Scottish National Party had already won all ten constituency seats in the region, it came as a surprise to McDonald, who famously appeared at the declaration wearing jeans and a T-shirt. He made his maiden speech on 2 June 2011 during a debate on Green Energy. McDonald has been a member of many committees in the parliament, but most recently sat on the Finance Committee and the Devolution & Further Powers Committee. In addition, he served on a number of Cross Party Groups (CPGs) including Oil & Gas, Carers, Epilepsy and Mental Health (which he co-convenes). He served as a Parliamentary Liaison Officer to the Deputy First Minister, John Swinney having previously been Parliamentary Liaison Officer to Alex Salmond during his tenure as First Minister.

In September 2011, McDonald announced he was to bring forward a Member's Bill on High Hedge Disputes, which was passed unanimously by the Scottish Parliament on 28 March 2013, making McDonald's bill the first Members' Bill to pass in the Parliamentary session.

McDonald has been a keen advocate for individuals on the autistic spectrum, leading members debates on the issue and asking questions of the Scottish Government. He has been a member of the Scotland Advisory Committee of the National Autistic Society and a trustee of the charity, Friendly Access, which looks to create a more accessible environment for individuals with sensory disabilities.

Following the death of Brian Adam in April 2013, Mark McDonald was selected as the SNP candidate for Aberdeen Donside and resigned his seat as a North East Scotland Region MSP to fight the by-election. McDonald held the seat for the SNP with a reduced majority and was returned to the Scottish Parliament on 20 June 2013.

In the 2016 Scottish Parliament election, McDonald contested the seat and was successfully re-elected winning 56% of the vote and increasing the SNP majority to 11,630 – the largest majority in the whole of Scotland.

=== Scottish Government ===
Following the Scottish Government reshuffle on 18 May 2016, McDonald was appointed to serve as Minister for Childcare & Early Years.

In March 2020, McDonald announced his plans to step down from parliament at the 2021 election.

=== Resignation from the SNP ===
McDonald tendered his resignation as minister on 4 November 2017 following the announcement by the SNP that he was being investigated for misconduct in the wake of the 2017 Westminster sexual misconduct allegations, saying "It has been brought to my attention that some of my previous actions have been considered to be inappropriate – where I have believed myself to have been merely humorous or attempting to be friendly, my behaviour might have made others uncomfortable or led them to question my intentions."

Two weeks later, McDonald was suspended from the SNP pending an internal investigation. After that investigation substantiated the charges, McDonald announced that he had resigned from the SNP ahead of a group meeting to decide on reinstating him. However, he intended to remain at Holyrood as an independent, despite all major parties in the chamber urging him to stand down.

On 21 June 2018 the parliament's standards committee recommended McDonald be suspended without pay for a month.

== Career after Parliament ==
In June 2021 McDonald, revealed that he had established a consultancy business following his departure from politics.

In August 2022, McDonald revealed on Twitter that he had begun working for Scottish Autism as their media and policy officer.

== Personal life ==
McDonald was married to Louise, with whom he has two children.

== Outside interests ==
A keen runner, McDonald announced in July 2019 that he was running the Chicago Marathon in October the same year to raise money for a local charity in the North East of Scotland.

Scottish Parliament
Preceded by Brian Adam	Member of the Scottish Parliament for Aberdeen Donside; 2013–2021	Succeeded by Jackie Dunbar
