= Angus South (Scottish Parliament constituency) =

Constituency of the Scottish Parliament

- County constituency for the Scottish Parliament
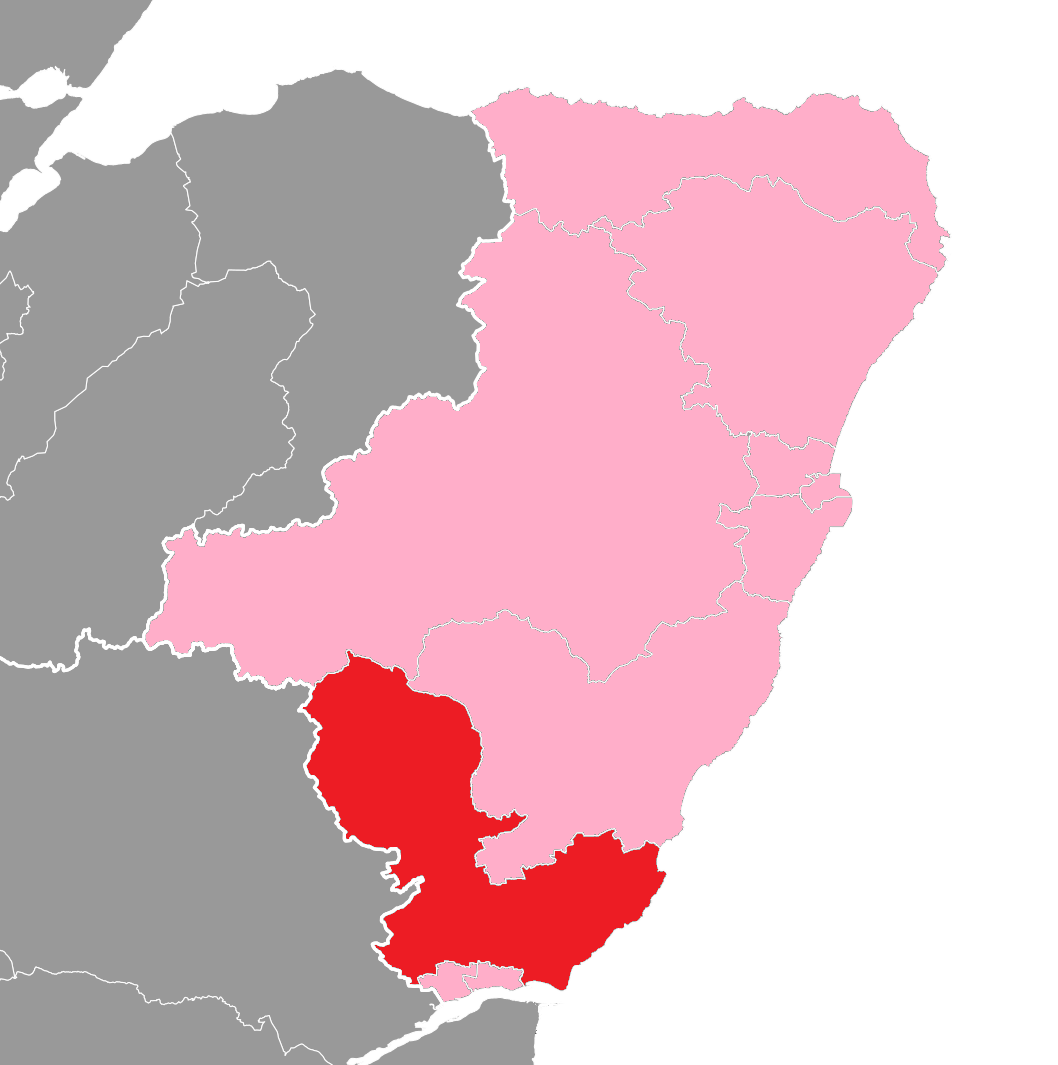

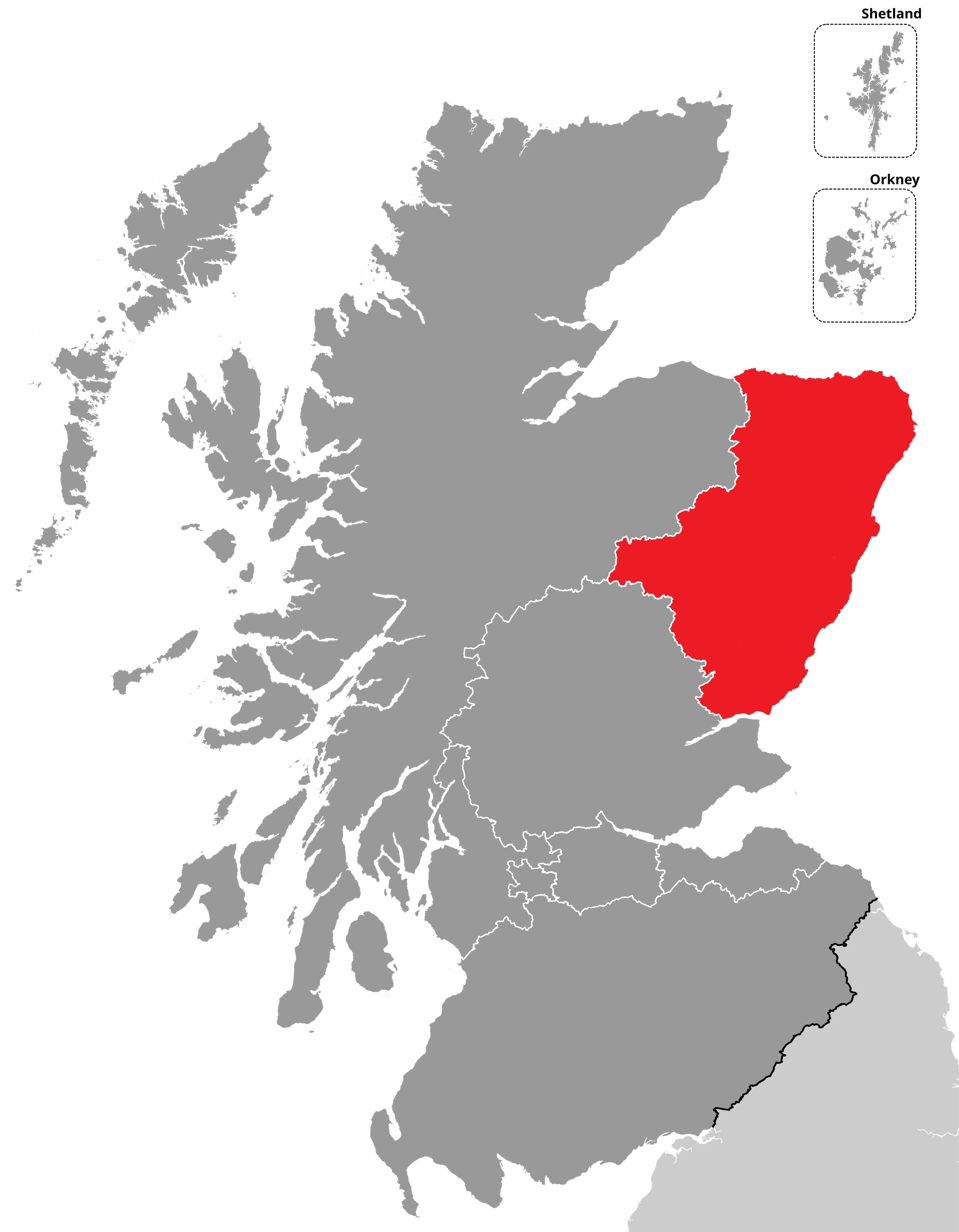
- Angus South shown within the North East Scotland electoral region and the region shown within Scotland
- Electoral region: North East Scotland
- Electorate: 58,967 (2026)

Current constituency
- Created: 2011
- Party: Scottish National Party
- MSP: Lloyd Melville
- Council area: Angus
- Created from: Angus, North Tayside

Angus South (Gaelic: Aonghas a Deas) is a county constituency of the Scottish Parliament covering part of the council area of Angus. Under the additional-member electoral system used for elections to the Scottish Parliament, it elects one Member of the Scottish Parliament (MSP) by the first past the post method of election. It is also one of ten constituencies in the North East Scotland electoral region, which elects seven additional members in addition to the ten constituency MSPs, producing a form of proportional representation for the region as a whole.

The seat was created for the 2011 Scottish Parliament election, and has been held since creation by the Scottish National Party.

== Electoral region ==
The other nine constituencies of the North East Scotland region are: Aberdeen Central, Aberdeen Deeside and North Kincardine, Aberdeen Donside, Aberdeenshire East, Aberdeenshire West, Angus North and Mearns, Banffshire and Buchan Coast, Dundee City East and Dundee City West. The region covers all of the Aberdeen City council area, the Aberdeenshire council area, the Angus council area, the Dundee City council area and part of the Moray council area.

== Constituency boundaries and council area ==
Map of boundaries from 2011

Angus is represented by two constituencies in the Scottish Parliament: Angus North and Mearns and Angus South.

Angus South was created at the first periodic review of Scottish Parliament boundaries ahead of the 2011 Scottish Parliament election, and covers areas that were formerly in the seats of Angus and Tayside North, both of which were abolished. It remained unchanged following the second periodic review of Scottish Parliament boundaries in 2025. The constituency comprises the following wards of Angus Council:

- Kirriemuir and Dean
- Monifieth and Sidlaw
- Carnoustie and District
- Arbroath West, Letham and Friockheim
- Arbroath East and Lunan

== Member of the Scottish Parliament ==
| Election | Member | Party |
|---|---|---|
| 2011 | Graeme Dey | SNP |
| 2026 | Lloyd Melville | SNP |

== Election results ==
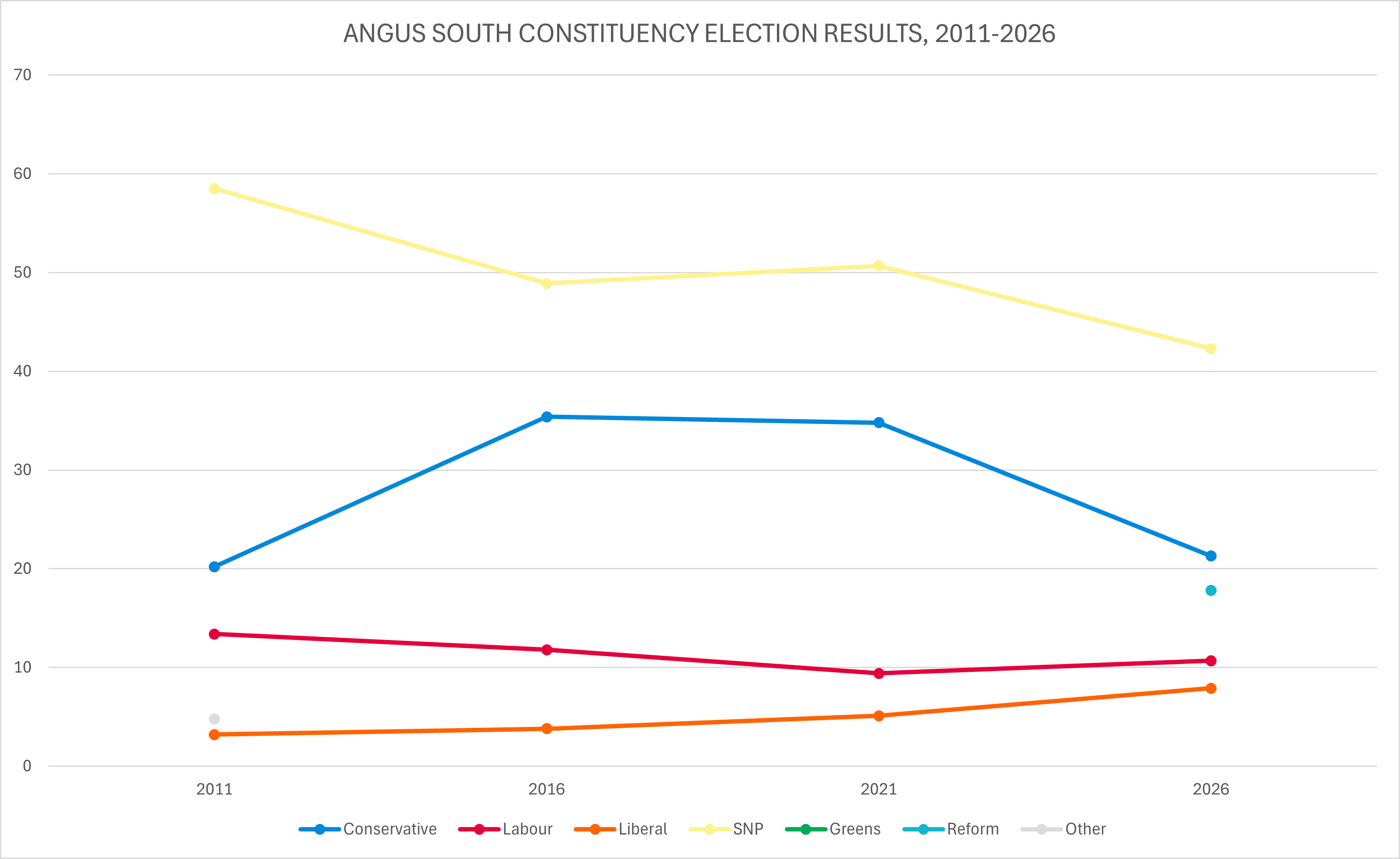
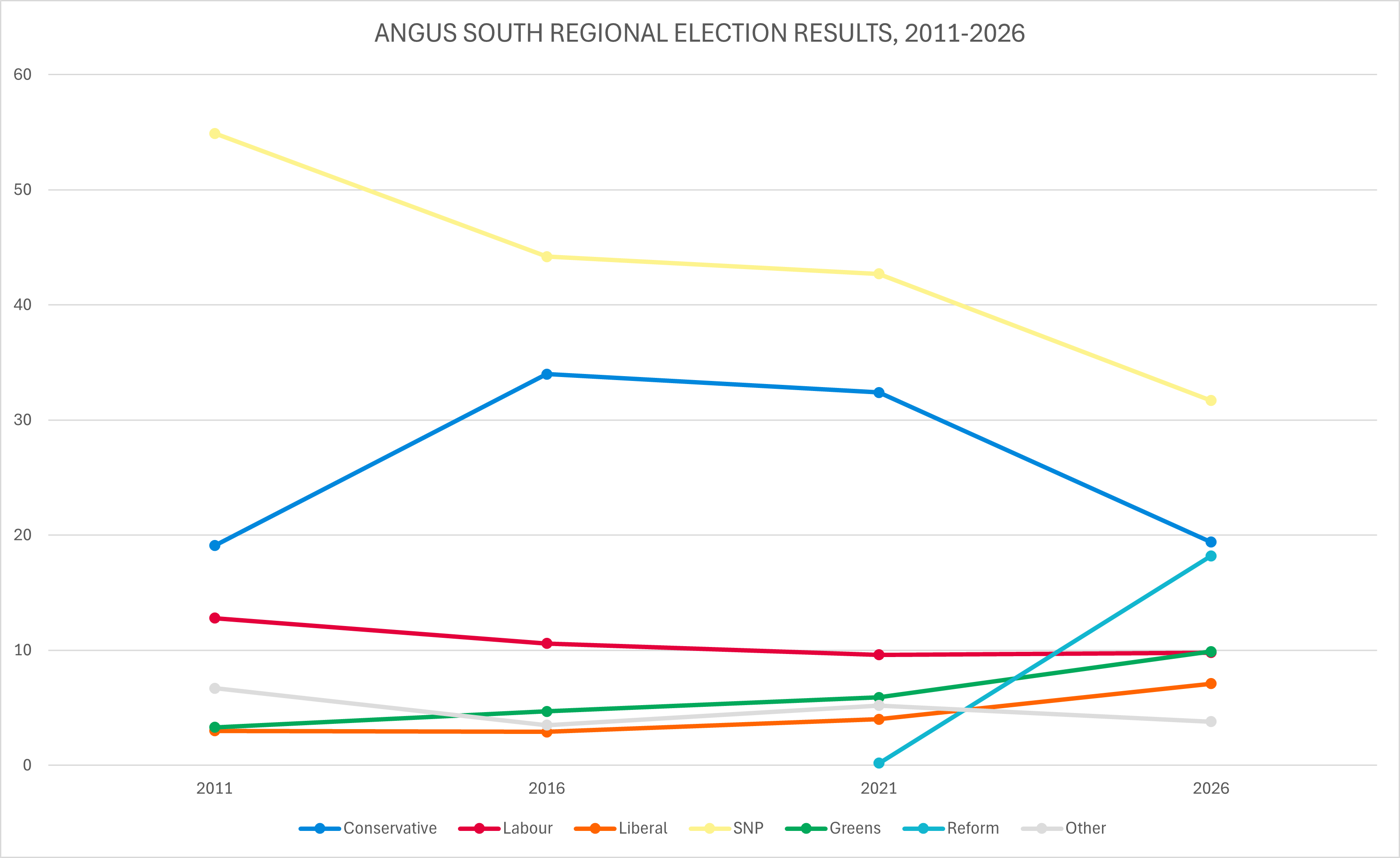

=== 2020s ===
2026 Scottish Parliament election: Angus South
| Party | Candidate | Constituency | | | Regional | | |
| Party | Candidate | Votes | % | ±% | Votes | % | ±% |
|---|---|---|---|---|---|---|---|
| SNP | Lloyd Melville | 13,289 | 42.3 | ▼8.4 | 9,968 | 31.7 | ▼11.0 |
| Conservative | Angus MacMillan Douglas | 6,681 | 21.3 | ▼13.5 | 6,091 | 19.4 | ▼13.0 |
| Reform | Bill Reid | 5,583 | 17.8 | New | 5,734 | 18.2 | ▲18.0 |
| Green | | | | | 3,113 | 9.9 | ▲4.0 |
| Labour | Heather Doran | 3,344 | 10.7 | ▲1.3 | 3,085 | 9.8 | ▲0.2 |
| Liberal Democrats | Isobel Knights | 2,488 | 7.9 | ▲2.8 | 2,227 | 7.1 | ▲3.1 |
| Independent Green Voice | | | | | 265 | 0.8 | ▲0.1 |
| AtLS | | | | | 249 | 0.8 | New |
| Scottish Family | | | | | 230 | 0.7 | ▲0.2 |
| ISP | | | | | 185 | 0.6 | New |
| Independent | Marie Boulton | | | | 80 | 0.3 | New |
| Scottish Socialist | | | | | 76 | 0.2 | New |
| Workers Party | | | | | 60 | 0.2 | New |
| Advance UK | | | | | 43 | 0.1 | New |
| Independent | Iris Leask | | | | 29 | 0.1 | New |
| Majority | | 6,608 | 21.1 | ▲5.2 | | | |
| Valid votes | | 31,385 | | | 31,435 | | |
| Invalid votes | | 123 | | | 61 | | |
| Turnout | | 31,508 | 53.4 | ▼11.7 | 31,496 | 53.4 | ▼11.8 |
| SNP hold | | Swing | | ▲2.6 | | | |
Notes

2021 Scottish Parliament election: Angus South
| Party | Candidate | Constituency | | | Regional | | |
| Party | Candidate | Votes | % | ±% | Votes | % | ±% |
|---|---|---|---|---|---|---|---|
| SNP | Graeme Dey (Note: Incumbent member for this constituency) | 19,568 | 50.7 | ▲1.8 | 16,524 | 42.7 | ▼1.5 |
| Conservative | Maurice Golden (Note: Incumbent member on the party list, or for another constituency) | 13,451 | 34.8 | ▼0.6 | 12,534 | 32.4 | ▼1.6 |
| Labour | Graeme McKenzie | 3,625 | 9.4 | ▼2.4 | 3,722 | 9.6 | ▼1.0 |
| Green | | | | | 2,265 | 5.9 | ▲1.2 |
| Liberal Democrats | Ben Lawrie | 1,964 | 5.1 | ▲1.3 | 1,557 | 4.0 | ▲1.1 |
| Alba | | | | | 788 | 2.0 | New |
| All for Unity | | | | | 366 | 0.9 | New |
| Independent Green Voice | | | | | 255 | 0.7 | New |
| Scottish Family | | | | | 179 | 0.5 | New |
| Abolish the Scottish Parliament | | | | | 116 | 0.3 | New |
| Reform | | | | | 88 | 0.2 | New |
| UKIP | | | | | 78 | 0.2 | ▼1.9 |
| Freedom Alliance (UK) | | | | | 73 | 0.2 | New |
| Restore Scotland | | | | | 59 | 0.2 | New |
| Independent | Laura Marshall | | | | 44 | 0.1 | New |
| Scottish Libertarian | | | | | 41 | 0.1 | 0.0 |
| Independent | Geoffrey Farquharson | | | | 13 | 0.0 | New |
| Renew | | | | | 8 | 0.0 | New |
| Majority | | 6,117 | 15.9 | ▲2.4 | | | |
| Valid votes | | 38,608 | | | 38,710 | | |
| Invalid votes | | 128 | | | 59 | | |
| Turnout | | 38,736 | 65.1 | ▲8.3 | 38,769 | 65.2 | ▲8.4 |
| SNP hold | | Swing | | | | | |

=== 2010s ===
2016 Scottish Parliament election: Angus South
| Party | Candidate | Constituency | | | Regional | | |
| Party | Candidate | Votes | % | ±% | Votes | % | ±% |
|---|---|---|---|---|---|---|---|
| SNP | Graeme Dey (Note: Incumbent member for this constituency) | 15,622 | 48.9 | ▼9.6 | 14,148 | 44.2 | ▼10.7 |
| Conservative | Kirstene Hair | 11,318 | 35.4 | ▲15.2 | 10,885 | 34.0 | ▲14.9 |
| Labour | Joanne McFadden | 3,773 | 11.8 | ▼1.6 | 3,399 | 10.6 | ▼2.2 |
| Green | | | | | 1,520 | 4.7 | ▲1.4 |
| Liberal Democrats | Clive Sneddon | 1,216 | 3.8 | ▲0.6 | 943 | 2.9 | ▼0.1 |
| UKIP | | | | | 667 | 2.1 | ▲1.1 |
| Scottish Christian | | | | | 174 | 0.5 | ▼0.2 |
| Solidarity | | | | | 83 | 0.3 | ▲0.2 |
| RISE | | | | | 60 | 0.2 | New |
| National Front | | | | | 50 | 0.2 | ▼0.1 |
| Scottish Libertarian | | | | | 45 | 0.1 | New |
| Communist | | | | | 43 | 0.1 | New |
| Majority | | 4,304 | 13.5 | ▼24.8 | | | |
| Valid votes | | 31,929 | | | 32,017 | | |
| Invalid votes | | 123 | | | 52 | | |
| Turnout | | 32,052 | 56.8 | ▲6.3 | 32,069 | 56.8 | ▲6.3 |
| SNP hold | | Swing | | ▼12.4 | | | |
Notes

2011 Scottish Parliament election: Angus South
| Party | Candidate | Constituency | | | Region | | |
| Party | Candidate | Votes | % | ±% | Votes | % | ±% |
|---|---|---|---|---|---|---|---|
| SNP | Graeme Dey | 16,164 | 58.5 | N/A | 15,171 | 54.9 | N/A |
| Conservative | Hughie Campbell Adamson | 5,581 | 20.2 | N/A | 5,283 | 19.1 | N/A |
| Labour | William Campbell | 3,703 | 13.4 | N/A | 3,547 | 12.8 | N/A |
| Independent (politician) | David Fairweather | 1,321 | 4.8 | N/A | | | |
| Green | | | | | 902 | 3.3 | N/A |
| Liberal Democrats | Clive Sneddon | 874 | 3.2 | N/A | 837 | 3.0 | N/A |
| All-Scotland Pensioners Party | | | | | 535 | 1.9 | N/A |
| Angus Independents | | | | | 369 | 1.3 | N/A |
| UKIP | | | | | 285 | 1.0 | N/A |
| BNP | | | | | 203 | 0.7 | N/A |
| Scottish Christian | | | | | 187 | 0.7 | N/A |
| Scottish Socialist | | | | | 96 | 0.3 | N/A |
| Socialist Labour | | | | | 94 | 0.3 | N/A |
| National Front | | | | | 60 | 0.2 | N/A |
| Solidarity | | | | | 20 | 0.1 | N/A |
| Others | | | | | 53 | 0.2 | N/A |
| Majority | | 10,583 | 38.3 | N/A | | | |
| Valid votes | | 27,643 | | | 27,642 | | |
| Invalid votes | | 75 | | | 94 | | |
| Turnout | | 27,718 | 50.5 | N/A | 27,736 | 50.5 | N/A |
| SNP win (new seat) | | | | | | | |

== See also ==
- South Angus (UK Parliament constituency)
