= Aberdeen North (Scottish Parliament constituency) =

Constituency of the Scottish Parliament

- Former burgh constituency for the Scottish Parliament
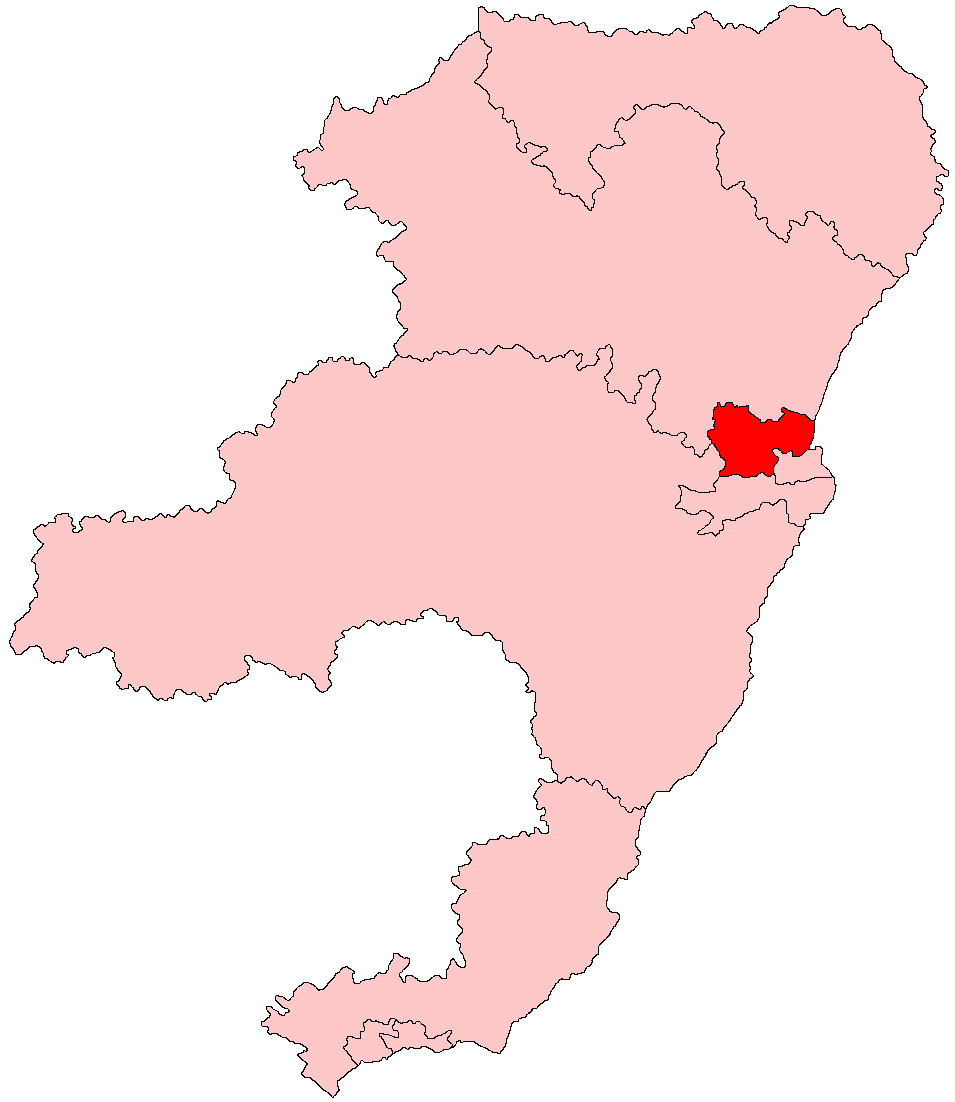

- Aberdeen North shown within the North East Scotland electoral region and the region shown within Scotland

Former constituency
- Created: 1999
- Abolished: 2011
- Council area: Aberdeen City (part)
- Replaced by: Aberdeen Donside

Aberdeen North was a constituency of the Scottish Parliament from 1999 to 2011. Under the additional-member electoral system used for elections to the Scottish Parliament, it elected one Member of the Scottish Parliament (MSP) by the plurality (first past the post) method of election. It was also one of nine constituencies in the Mid Scotland and Fife electoral region, which elected seven additional members, in addition to the nine constituency MSPs, to produce a form of proportional representation for the region as a whole.

== Electoral region ==
See also North East Scotland (Scottish Parliament electoral region)#1999–2011

Between 1999 and 2011, the North East Scotland electoral region consisted of Aberdeen Central, Aberdeen North, Aberdeen South, Angus, Banff and Buchan, Dundee East, Dundee West, Gordon, and West Aberdeenshire and Kincardine. The region covered the Aberdeenshire council area, the Aberdeen City council area, the Dundee City council area, part of the Angus council area, a small part of the Moray council area, and a small part of the Perth and Kinross council area.

== Constituency boundaries ==
The Aberdeen North constituency was created at the same time as the Scottish Parliament, in 1999, with the name and boundaries of the existing Aberdeen North (UK Parliament constituency). Ahead of the 2005 United Kingdom general election the boundaries of the House of Commons of the United Kingdom constituency were subject to major alterations.

=== Boundary review ===
See Scottish Parliament constituencies and regions from 2011

Following the first periodic review of Scottish Parliament boundaries in 2011, the Boundary Commission for Scotland created three new seats for the Aberdeen City council area. These seats, first contested at the 2011 election, were Aberdeen Central, Aberdeen Donside, and Aberdeen South and North Kincardine. Aberdeen North was largely succeeded by Aberdeen Donside.

== Member of the Scottish Parliament ==
Election	Member	Party
1999	Elaine Thomson	Scottish Labour Party
2003	Brian Adam	Scottish National Party
2011	constituency abolished: replaced by Aberdeen Donside	

== Election results ==
2007 Scottish Parliament election: Aberdeen North
Party	Candidate	Votes	%	±%
SNP	Brian Adam	11,406	45.8	+12.3
Labour	Elaine Thomson	7,657	30.8	−0.9
Liberal Democrats	Steve Delaney	3,836	15.4	−7.6
Conservative	Carol Garvie	1,992	8.0	−1.2
Majority		3,749	15.0	+13.2
Turnout		24,891	48.3	+1.0
SNP hold		Swing		

2003 Scottish Parliament election: Aberdeen North
Party	Candidate	Votes	%	±%
SNP	Brian Adam	8,381	33.5	−2.2
Labour	Elaine Thomson	7,924	31.7	−5.5
Liberal Democrats	John Reynolds	5,767	23.0	+5.9
Conservative	Jim Gifford	2,311	9.2	−0.8
Scottish Socialist	Katrine Trolle	644	2.6	New
Majority		457	1.8	N/A
Turnout		25027	47.3	
SNP gain from Labour		Swing	+1.7	

1999 Scottish Parliament election: Aberdeen North
Party	Candidate	Votes	%	±%
Labour	Elaine Thomson	10,340	37.2	N/A
SNP	Brian Adam	9,942	35.7	N/A
Liberal Democrats	James Donaldson	4,767	17.1	N/A
Conservative	Iain Haughie	2,772	10.0	N/A
Majority		398	1.5	N/A
Turnout		27,821		N/A
Labour win (new seat)				

== See also ==
- Scottish Parliament (Constituencies) Act 2004
- Aberdeen City Youth Council
