= Paul Wheelhouse =

Scottish politician

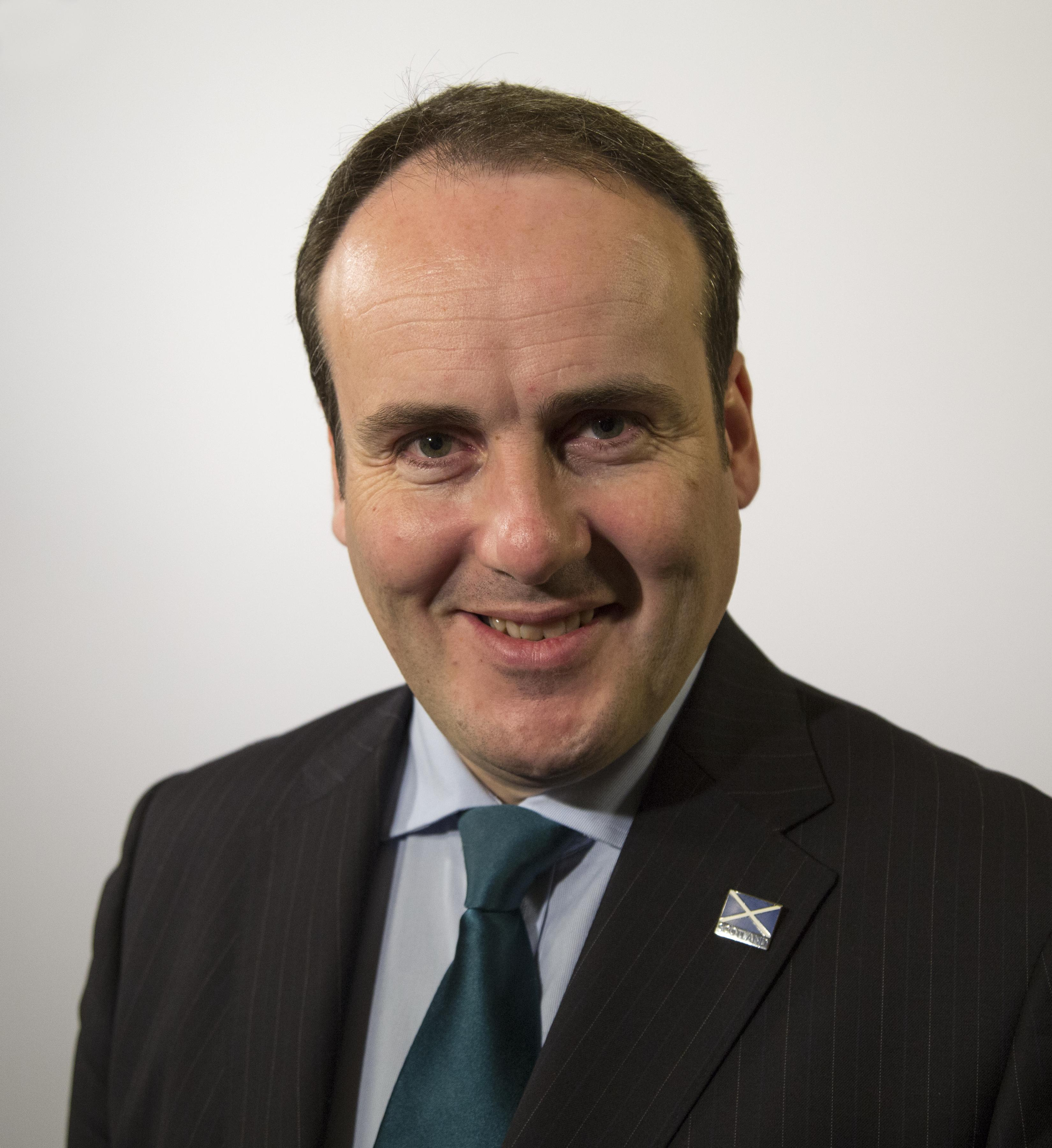
- Wheelhouse in 2016

Minister for Energy, Connectivity and the Islands
- In office 27 June 2018 – 19 May 2021
- First Minister: Nicola Sturgeon
- Preceded by: Humza Yousaf
- Succeeded by: Graeme Dey

Minister for Business, Innovation and Energy
- In office 18 May 2016 – 26 June 2018
- First Minister: Nicola Sturgeon
- Preceded by: Fergus Ewing
- Succeeded by: Jamie Hepburn

Minister for Community Safety and Legal Affairs
- In office 21 November 2014 – 18 May 2016
- First Minister: Nicola Sturgeon
- Preceded by: Roseanna Cunningham
- Succeeded by: Annabelle Ewing

Minister for Environment and Climate Change
- In office 6 September 2012 – 21 November 2014
- First Minister: Alex Salmond
- Preceded by: Stewart Stevenson
- Succeeded by: Aileen McLeod

Member of the Scottish Parliament for South Scotland (1 of 7 Regional MSPs)
- In office 5 May 2011 – 5 May 2021

Personal details
- Born: Paul Richard William Wheelhouse; 22 June 1970 (age 56) Dundonald, County Down, Northern Ireland
- Party: Scottish National Party
- Education: Stewart's Melville College
- Alma mater: University of Aberdeen; University of Edinburgh

Paul Richard William Wheelhouse (born 22 June 1970) is a former Scottish National Party (SNP) politician who served as Minister for Energy, Connectivity and the Islands from 2018 to 2021. He was a Member of the Scottish Parliament (MSP) for the South Scotland region from 2011 until 2021 and Minister for Business, Innovation and Energy in the Scottish Government from May 2016 to June 2018.

== Early life ==
Wheelhouse was born in 1970 in Dundonald, County Down. He was raised in Edinburgh, where he attended the independent, fee-paying Stewart's Melville College. He graduated with a Scottish MA degree in Economic Science from the University of Aberdeen and an MBA from the University of Edinburgh. He is a former member of the Conservative Party and was active in the University of Aberdeen Conservative and Unionist Association.

Before entering politics, Wheelhouse worked as an economist, specialising in higher education, government policy and impact assessments for private capital projects.

== Political career ==
Wheelhouse was the SNP candidate in the Berwickshire, Roxburgh and Selkirk constituency in the 2010 United Kingdom general election, coming fourth with 4,497 votes (9.2%).

=== Member of the Scottish Parliament ===
Wheelhouse ran in the Ettrick, Roxburgh and Berwickshire constituency at the 2011 Scottish Parliament election, increasing the SNP's share of the vote by 8.6%, and finished second to John Lamont of the Conservatives. The SNP were entitled to representation on the South Scotland regional list, with Wheelhouse being among the four MSPs elected for the party in that region.

In September 2012, Wheelhouse became Minister for Environment and Climate Change, replacing Stewart Stevenson. When Nicola Sturgeon became First Minister in November 2014, he was appointed to the position of Minister for Community Safety and Legal Affairs.

In the 2016 Scottish Parliament election, Wheelhouse stood again in Ettrick, Roxburgh and Berwickshire, where he received 10,521 votes (31.8%). Having not been elected as a constituency MSP, he was returned to the Parliament by the regional list.

Wheelhouse retained second place on the constituency vote at the 2021 Scottish Parliament election, taking 11,701 votes (32.5%), up by 0.7%. On the regional list, he was placed third, and was not re-elected, making him the only government minister to lose their seat in the election.
