= 2001 Banff and Buchan by-election =

By-election to replace a member of the Scottish Parliament

The 2001 Banff and Buchan by-election to the Scottish Parliament was held on 7 June 2001, the same day as a UK general election and also a Scottish Parliament by-election in Strathkelvin and Bearsden. The by-election was caused by the resignation of Scottish National Party (SNP) politician Alex Salmond as MSP for Banff and Buchan.

The SNP retained the Holyrood seat with Stewart Stevenson (who had originally been selected to contest the Westminster constituency) winning for them.

== Result ==
Banff and Buchan by-election, 2001
Party	Candidate	Votes	%	±%
SNP	Stewart Stevenson	15,386	49.6	−3.0
Conservative	Ted Brocklebank	6,819	22.0	+5.0
Labour	Megan Harris	4,897	15.8	+2.2
Liberal Democrats	Kenyon Wright	3,231	10.4	−6.4
Scottish Socialist	Peter Anderson	682	2.2	New
Majority		8,567	27.6	−8.0
Turnout		31,015		
SNP hold		Swing		

== Scottish Parliament election result, 1999 ==
Scottish Parliament election, Banff and Buchan, 1999
Party	Candidate	Votes	%	±%
SNP	Alex Salmond	16,695	52.6	N/A
Conservative	David Davidson	5,403	17.0	N/A
Liberal Democrats	Maitland Mackie	5,315	16.8	N/A
Labour	Megan Harris	4,321	13.6	N/A
Majority		11,292	35.6	N/A
Turnout		31,734		N/A
SNP win (new seat)				

== See also ==
- Elections in Scotland
- List of by-elections to the Scottish Parliament
