= Stewart Stevenson =

Scottish politician (born 1946)

Stewart Stevenson MA MSc FSAScot FRSSA
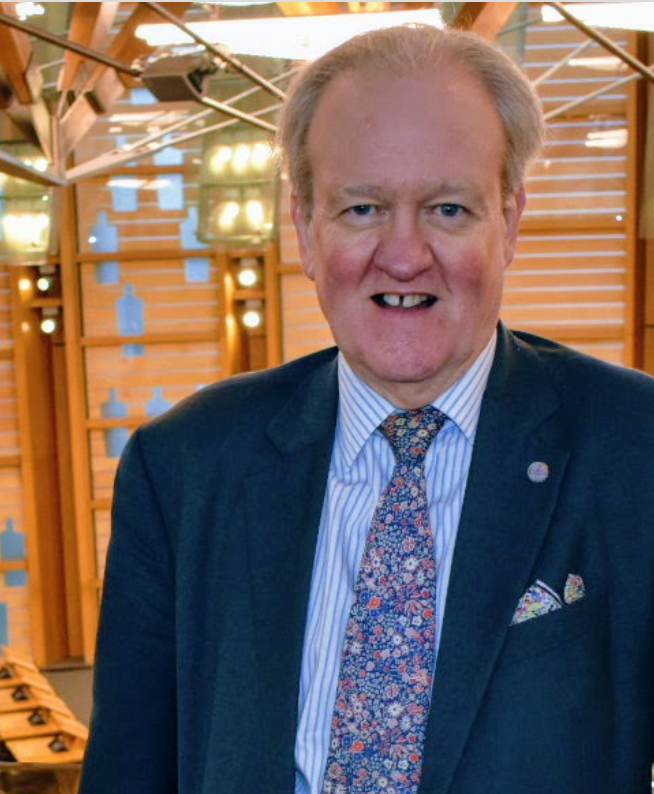
- Stevenson in 2020

National Secretary of the Scottish National Party
- In office 30 November 2020 – 29 November 2021
- Preceded by: Angus Macleod
- Succeeded by: Lorna Finn

Minister for Environment and Climate Change
- In office 25 May 2011 – 6 September 2012
- First Minister: Alex Salmond
- Preceded by: Roseanna Cunningham
- Succeeded by: Paul Wheelhouse

Minister for Transport, Infrastructure and Climate Change
- In office 17 May 2007 – 11 December 2010
- First Minister: Alex Salmond
- Preceded by: Tavish Scott (Note: As Minister for Transport.)
- Succeeded by: Keith Brown (Note: As Minister for Transport and Infrastructure.)

Convenor of the SNP Scottish Parliamentary Group
- In office 7 May 2003 – 17 May 2007
- Succeeded by: Gil Paterson

Member of the Scottish Parliament for Banffshire & Buchan Coast Banff and Buchan (2001–2011)
- In office 7 June 2001 – 5 May 2021
- Preceded by: Alex Salmond
- Succeeded by: Karen Adam

Personal details
- Born: 15 October 1946 (age 80) Edinburgh, Scotland
- Party: Scottish National Party
- Spouse: Sandra Pirie
- Education: University of Aberdeen; University of Strathclyde; University of Exeter
- Profession: Software engineer
- Website: stewartstevenson.scot 8th.decade.scot

James Alexander Stewart Stevenson (Gaelic: Seamus Alasdair Stiùbhart MacSteafain; born 15 October 1946) is a Scottish former politician who served as Minister for Transport, Infrastructure and Climate Change from 2007 to 2010 and Minister for Environment and Climate Change from 2011 to 2012. A member of the Scottish National Party (SNP), he was Member of the Scottish Parliament (MSP) for Banffshire and Buchan Coast, formerly Banff and Buchan, from 2001 to 2021.

== Early life ==
Stevenson was born in Edinburgh. His father James Stevenson was a doctor and his mother Helen MacGregor was a teacher. He was brought up in Cupar, Fife. He was educated at Bell Baxter High School then studied mathematics at the University of Aberdeen. He worked in information technology with the Bank of Scotland for 30 years, retiring in 1999 as Director of Technology Innovation.

== Political career ==
=== In Opposition ===
Stevenson joined the Scottish National Party (SNP) in 1961. He stood as an SNP candidate in the Linlithgow constituency in the 1999 Scottish General election but was unsuccessful.

In January 2001 Stevenson was adopted as the candidate for Banff and Buchan, ahead of the by-election on 7 June 2001 that was triggered by Alex Salmond's resignation from the seat to concentrate on Westminster politics. Stevenson was elected with a majority of 8,500 votes over the Conservative candidate.

He made his maiden speech on the European Union's Common Fisheries Policy on 14 June 2001.

He was re-elected to the constituency in the 2003 elections.

=== University Challenge ===
In 2004 he was a member of the Scottish Parliament team in the TV general knowledge programme, University Challenge – The Professionals. He and fellow team members Richard Baker (Labour), Robin Harper (Green), Jamie Stone (Lib Dem) who was captain, beat a Welsh Assembly team by 110 points to 75.

=== Responsibilities ===
In opposition he was Deputy Party Spokesperson on Health until September 2004, then becoming Deputy Party Spokesperson on Justice with responsibility for Prisons and Drugs policy. He was Convenor of the SNP Group in the Scottish Parliament and Deputy Convenor of the Parliament's Justice 1 Committee. In addition he ended Session 2 as a substitute member of the Parliament's Health Committee and Deputy Convenor of the Parliament's Cross Party Group on Visual Impairment.

=== Records ===
By the end of Parliament's second session on 2 April 2007 he had made 284 speeches in the Scottish Parliament and was thus the most prolific speaker since the Parliament's being re-convened in 1999. By the end of Session 3 in March 2011, he had made 406 speeches and retained the position of "most prolific parliamentary speaker". He reached his 500th speech on the Tribunals (Scotland) Bill, on 7 November 2013.

He can, arguably, hold the record for the longest speech in Parliament. He commenced a speech on International Suicide Prevention Week at 17:21 on Wednesday, 7 September 2004 and completed it at 17:12 on Thursday, 8 September 2004 nearly 24 hours later. However this was due to the failure of the Parliament's sound system just after he started to speak.

On 12 June 2015, he became the first Member of the Scottish Parliament to have made 600 speeches.

=== In Government ===
In the 2007 Scottish General election on 3 May, he was returned with a majority of 10,530, the largest in Scotland, over the Scottish Conservative Party candidate. The SNP formed a minority government and on 17 May Stevenson was appointed the Minister for Transport, Infrastructure and Climate Change. This appointment covered: the land use planning system, climate change, building standards, transport policy and delivery, public transport, road, rail services, canals, harbours, air and ferry services, Scottish Water.

As Minister, Stevenson piloted the SNP Government's first Bill, Abolition of Bridge Tolls (Scotland) Bill., which received royal assent on 24 January 2008, becoming the Abolition of Bridge Tolls (Scotland) Act 2008. At the end of May the Scottish Executive approved The Port of Cairnryan Harbour Empowerment Order 2007 and with this Stevenson became the first SNP Minister to sign a piece of legislation. He also brought forward the SNP's first Legislative Consent Motion, previously known as Sewel Motions, on the subject of the UK Climate Change Bill. He was also the first SNP Minister to lose a vote in Parliament on the subject of the Edinburgh Trams project.

As the Minister for Transport, he was involved with the progressing the legislation for the Forth Replacement Crossing, continuing a family association with Firth of Forth infrastructure projects. His great uncle, Sir Alexander Stevenson, was Chairman of the Forth Road Bridge Campaign Committee in the 1930s; the Forth Road Bridge opened in 1964.

In March 2009 Stevenson apologised for the use of an "intemperate word" in Parliament when he said the word "bollocks" in an off-mic remark in response to sedentary remarks by Liberal Democrat MSP Mike Rumbles on the relationship between Scottish ministers and officials at Transport Scotland.

After an unusually heavy snowfall in December 2010 caught authorities by surprise and left thousands of motorists stranded overnight on major highways, Stevenson called the government's response "first class" and refused to apologise; anger over the lack of preparedness and over his initial response made his position untenable, and he resigned on 11 December.

=== 2011 Scottish Parliament election ===
In the 2011 Scottish Parliament election, under the re-drawn constituency boundaries, Stevenson was elected as the SNP member for the new seat of Banffshire and Buchan Coast; 16,812 votes cast for him was 67.24% of the total, the highest share of votes cast out of all the constituency elections for the Scottish Parliament in 2011.

Under the Second Salmond government Stevenson returned to a ministerial position, appointed as Minister for Environment and Climate Change on 20 May 2011. His ministerial role ended with the re-shuffle announced on 5 September 2012, when he was replaced as Minister by Paul Wheelhouse MSP.

=== 2016 Scottish Parliament election ===
In the 2016 Scottish Parliament election, Stevenson was re-elected as member for Banffshire and Buchan Coast at the 2016 election with a reduced majority of 6,583.

=== 2021 Scottish Parliament election ===
Stevenson did not stand for election in 2021, having previously announced his retirement.

Karen Adam was elected as his successor with a majority of 772.

Stevenson was elected National Secretary of the SNP on 30 November 2020 and served for a year.

== After His Political Career ==
Stevenson returned to University to study for an MSc in Genealogical, Palaeographic and Heraldic Studies at the University of Strathclyde. He graduated in November 2025.

He enrolled at the University of Exeter in September 2026 to do research for a PhD degree, which at this institution involves being initially registered for an MPhil.

== Notes ==
Scottish Parliament
| Preceded by Alex Salmond | Member of Parliament for Banff and Buchan; 2001 – 2011 | Constituency abolished |
| New constituency | Member of Parliament for Banffshire and Buchan Coast; 2011 – 2021 | Succeeded by Karen Adam |
Political offices
| Preceded by Roseanna Cunningham | Minister for Environment and Climate Change; 2011–2012 | Succeeded by Paul Wheelhouse |
| Preceded by Tavish Scott as Minister for Transport | Minister for Transport, Infrastructure and Climate Change; 2007–2010 | Succeeded by Keith Brown as Minister for Transport and Infrastructure |
