= Cabinet Secretary for Environment, Climate Change and Land Reform =

Cabinet position in the Scottish Government

Cabinet Secretary for Environment, Climate Change and Land Reform of Scottish Government
- Incumbent; Office not in use since 19 May 2021
- Style: Cabinet Secretary; Environment Secretary
- Appointer: First Minister
- Inaugural holder: John Home Robertson Deputy Minister for Fisheries and Land Reform
- Formation: July 1999
- Website: www.gov.scot

The Cabinet Secretary for Environment, Climate Change and Land Reform was a cabinet post in the Scottish Government. The Cabinet Secretary was supported by the Minister for Rural Affairs and the Natural Environment, who also reported to the Cabinet Secretary for the Rural Economy.

== Overview ==
=== Responsibilities ===
The responsibilities of the Cabinet Secretary for Environment, Climate Change and Land Reform:

- climate change and environmental protection
- biodiversity
- environmental and climate justice
- flood prevention and coastal erosion
- land use and land reform
- animal welfare
- wildlife crime
- water quality

=== Public bodies ===
The following public bodies report to the Cabinet Secretary for Environment, Climate Change and Land Reform:

- Cairngorms National Park Authority
- Crown Estate Scotland
- Drinking Water Quality Regulator
- Forestry and Land Scotland
- Loch Lomond and The Trossachs National Park Authority
- NatureScot
- Royal Botanic Garden Edinburgh
- Scottish Canals
- Scottish Environment Protection Agency
- Scottish Forestry
- Scottish Land Commission
- Scottish Water
- Water Industry Commission for Scotland

== History ==
In the first Dewar Government, the environment brief was the responsibility of the Minister for Transport and Environment and the Deputy Minister for Fisheries and Land Reform, changing to the Minister of the Environment, Sport and Culture and the Deputy Minister for Rural Development from 2000 to 2001. From 2001 and 2007, environment was combined with the rural affairs brief for the Minister for the Environment and Rural Development, with the associated deputy post of Deputy Minister for Environment and Rural Development.

The Salmond government, elected following the 2007 Scottish Parliament election, created the junior ministerial post of the Minister for Environment who assisted the Cabinet Secretary for Rural Affairs, Food and Environment, in the Scottish Executive Environment and Rural Affairs Department. A junior minister did not attend the Scottish Cabinet unless his/her Cabinet Secretary was absent. The Minister for Environment and Climate Change and Land Reform took the lead role in environment and natural heritage, crofting, forestry, aquaculture, sport fishing, land reform, access, water quality regulation, sustainable development and climate change. In 2010, Climate Change was added to the Environment portfolio becoming Minister for Environment and Climate Change. Land reform was added to the title in November 2014 after Nicola Sturgeon's first reshuffle on her appointment to First Minister of Scotland.

The Ministerial post was abolished in May 2016 at the beginning of the second Sturgeon government. The duties of the junior Ministerial post were upgraded to full Cabinet Secretary status at that point as the Cabinet Secretary for Environment, Climate Change and Land Reform.

== List of office holders ==
The final Cabinet Secretary for Environment, Climate Change and Land Reform was Roseanna Cunningham.

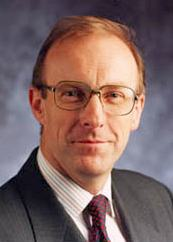
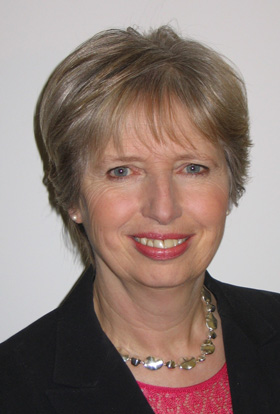
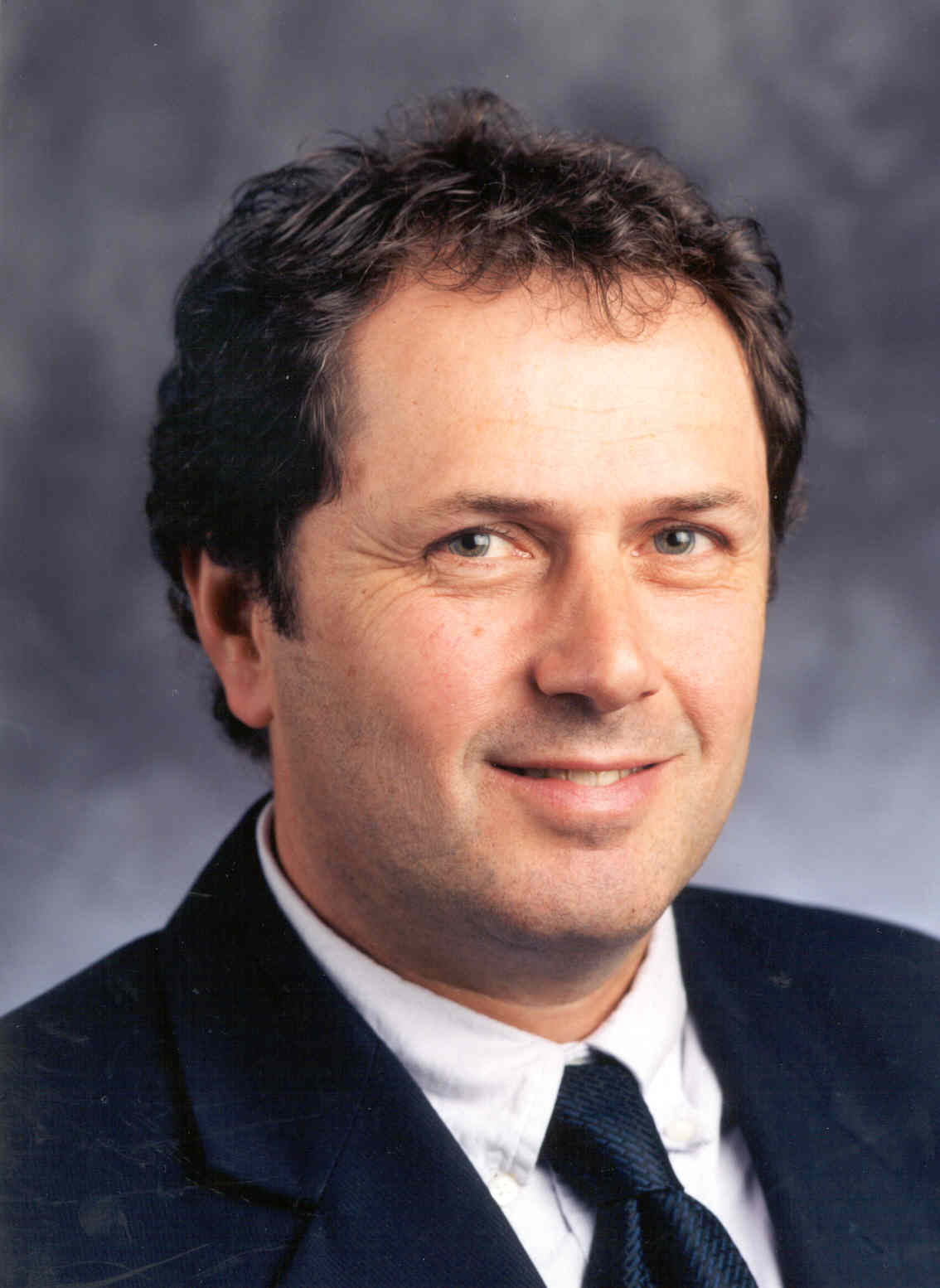
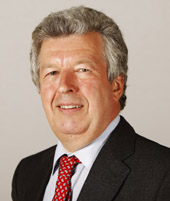
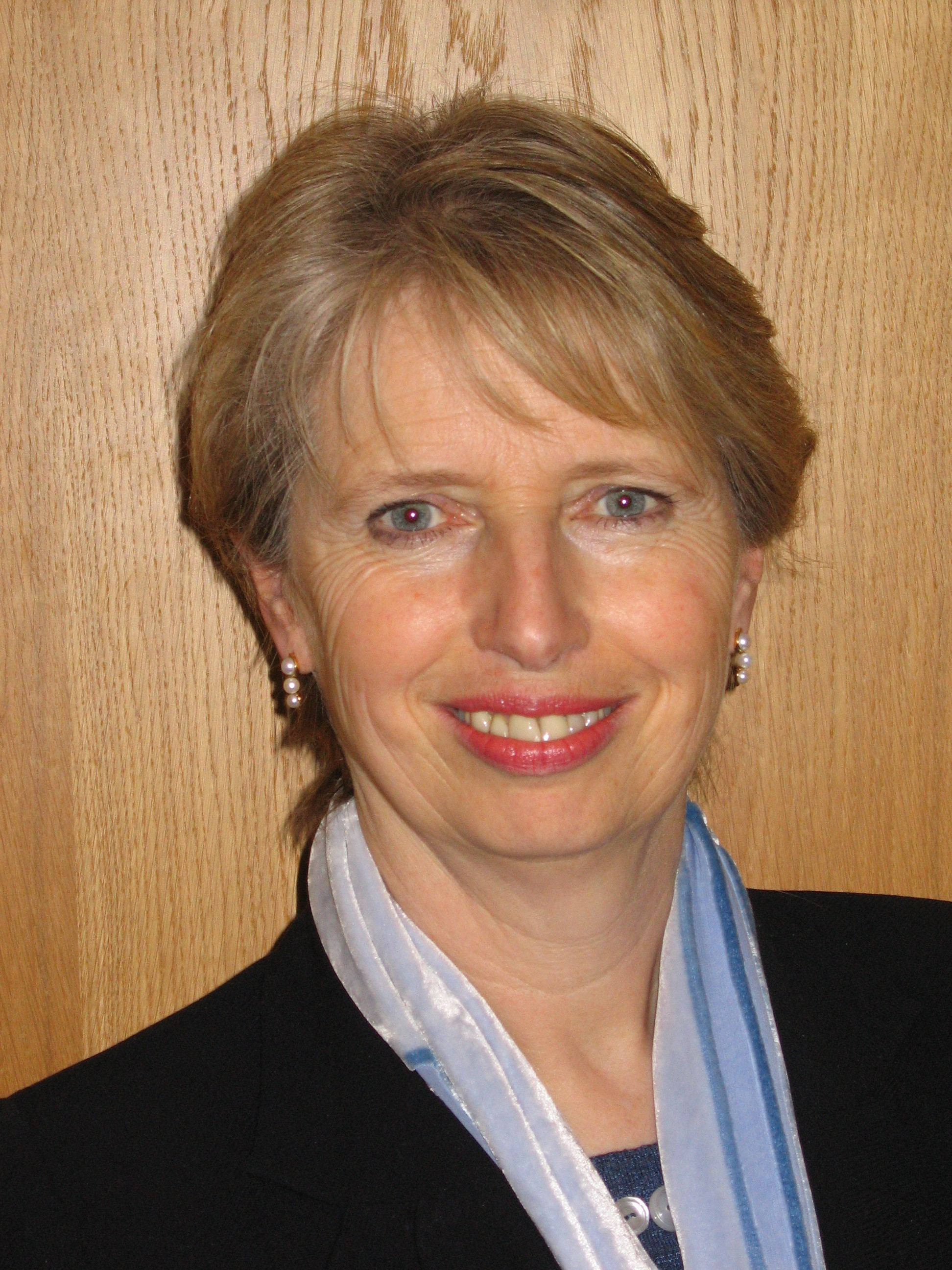
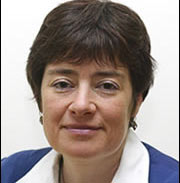
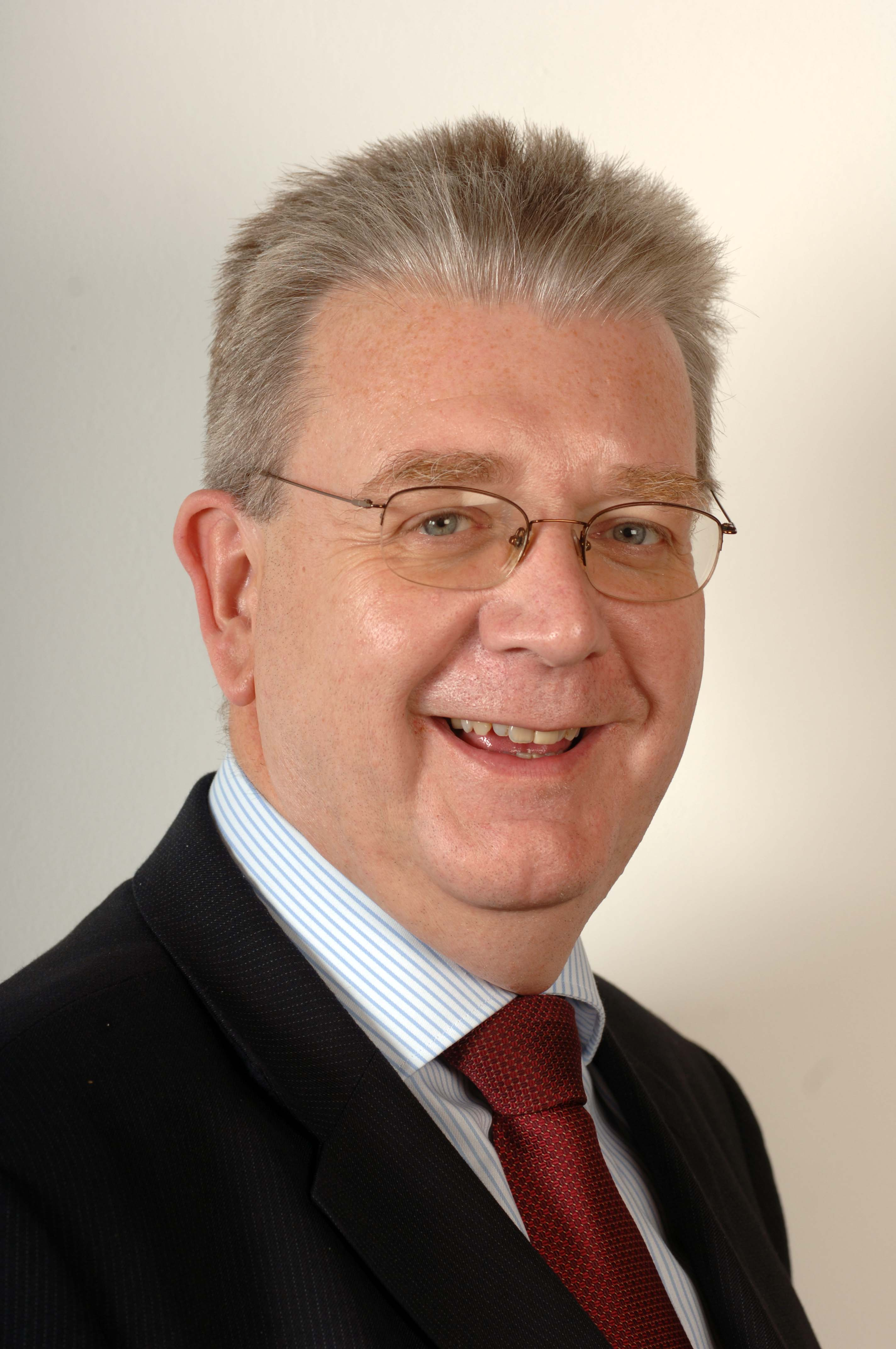
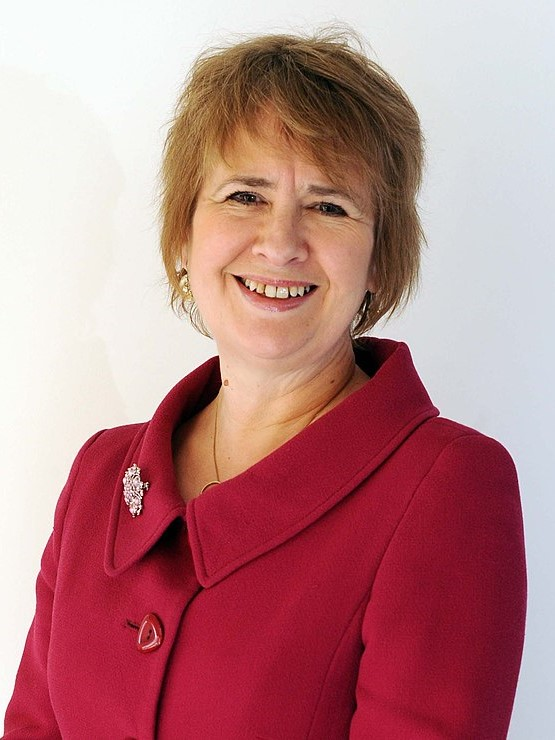
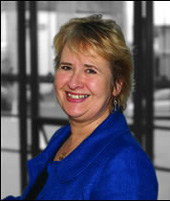
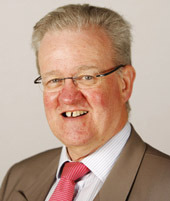
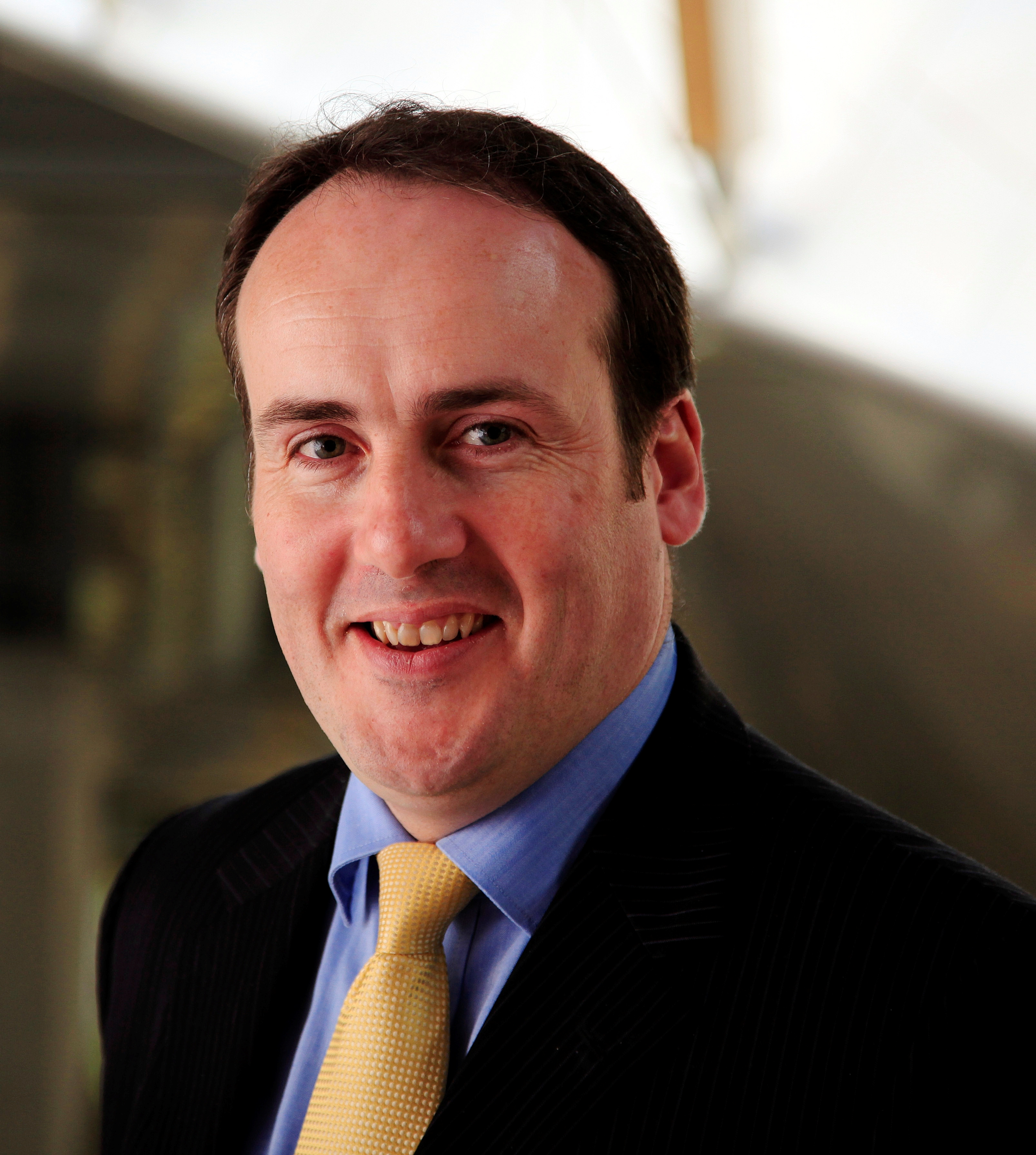
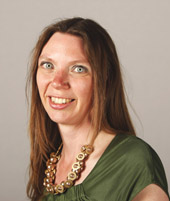
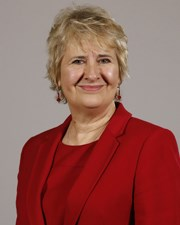
=== Deputy Minister for Fisheries and Land Reform ===
Name	Entered office	Left office	Party
John Home Robertson	19 May 1999	2 November 2000	Labour
=== Deputy Minister for Rural Development ===
Rhona Brankin	2 November 2000	29 November 2001	Labour
=== Deputy Minister for Environment and Rural Development ===
Allan Wilson	29 November 2001	1 October 2004	Labour
Lewis Macdonald	1 October 2004	27 June 2005	Labour
Rhona Brankin	27 June 2005	14 November 2006	Labour
Sarah Boyack	14 November 2006	17 May 2007	Labour
=== Minister for Environment ===
Michael Russell	17 May 2007	12 February 2009	Scottish National Party
Roseanna Cunningham	12 February 2009	11 December 2010	Scottish National Party
=== Minister for Environment and Climate Change ===
Roseanna Cunningham	11 December 2010	24 May 2011	Scottish National Party
Stewart Stevenson	25 May 2011	6 September 2012	Scottish National Party
Paul Wheelhouse	6 September 2012	21 November 2014	Scottish National Party
=== Minister for Environment, Climate Change and Land Reform ===
Aileen McLeod	21 November 2014	18 May 2016	Scottish National Party
=== Cabinet Secretary for Environment, Climate Change and Land Reform ===
Roseanna Cunningham	18 May 2016	19 May 2021	Scottish National Party
