= Alex Salmond =

First Minister of Scotland from 2007 to 2014

The Right Honourable Alex Salmond
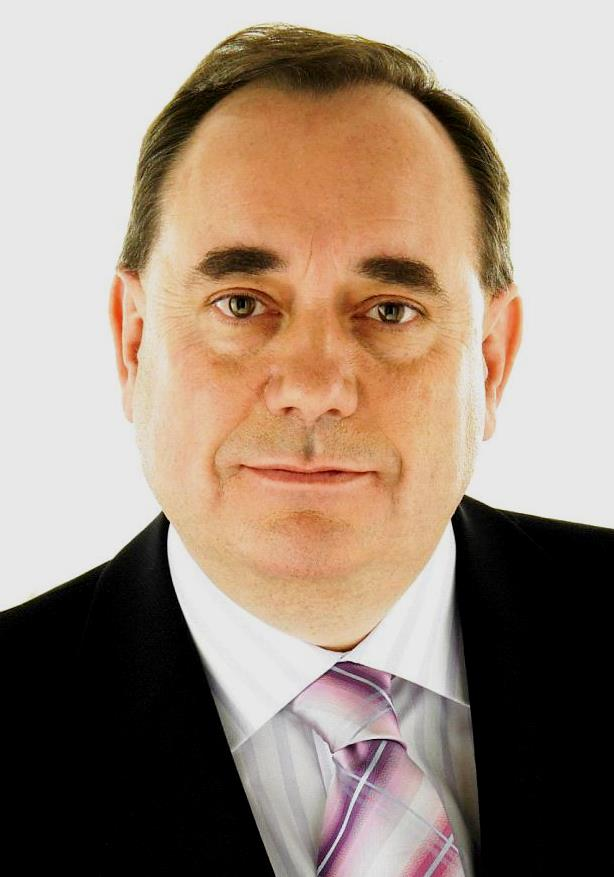
- Official portrait, 2007

First Minister of Scotland
- In office 17 May 2007 – 18 November 2014
- Monarch: Elizabeth II
- Deputy: Nicola Sturgeon
- Preceded by: Jack McConnell
- Succeeded by: Nicola Sturgeon

Leader of the Alba Party
- In office 26 March 2021 – 12 October 2024
- Depute: Kenny MacAskill
- UK Parliament Leader: Neale Hanvey
- Preceded by: Laurie Flynn
- Succeeded by: Kenny MacAskill

Leader of the Scottish National Party
- In office 3 September 2004 – 14 November 2014
- Depute: Nicola Sturgeon
- Preceded by: John Swinney
- Succeeded by: Nicola Sturgeon
- In office 22 September 1990 – 26 September 2000
- Depute: Alasdair Morgan; Jim Sillars; Allan Macartney; John Swinney
- Preceded by: Gordon Wilson
- Succeeded by: John Swinney

Depute Leader of the Scottish National Party
- In office 26 September 1987 – 22 September 1990
- Leader: Gordon Wilson
- Preceded by: Margaret Ewing
- Succeeded by: Alasdair Morgan
Parliamentary offices
Member of Parliament
In office 7 May 2015 – 3 May 2017
Preceded by	Malcolm Bruce
Succeeded by	Colin Clark
Constituency	Gordon
In office 11 June 1987 – 12 April 2010
Preceded by	Albert McQuarrie
Succeeded by	Eilidh Whiteford
Constituency	Banff and Buchan
Member of the Scottish Parliament
In office 3 May 2007 – 24 March 2016
Preceded by	Nora Radcliffe
Succeeded by	Gillian Martin
Constituency	Gordon (2007–2011); Aberdeenshire East (2011–2016)
In office 6 May 1999 – 7 June 2001
Preceded by	Constituency established
Succeeded by	Stewart Stevenson
Constituency	Banff and Buchan

Personal details
- Born: Alexander Elliot Anderson Salmond; 31 December 1954 Linlithgow, West Lothian, Scotland
- Died: 12 October 2024 (aged 69) Ohrid, North Macedonia
- Party: Alba (2018–2024)
- Other political affiliations: SNP (1973–2018) (Note: Membership suspended briefly in 1982.); 79 Group (1981–1982)
- Spouse: Moira McGlashan (m. 1981)
- Education: Edinburgh College of Commerce; University of St Andrews
- Cabinet: First Salmond government; Second Salmond government
- Salmond's voice from the BBC programme Desert Island Discs, 21 January 2011

Alexander Elliot Anderson Salmond (Note: /ˈsæmənd/ SAM-ənd;) (31 December 1954 – 12 October 2024) was a Scottish politician and economist who served as First Minister of Scotland from 2007 to 2014. A prominent figure in the Scottish nationalist movement, he was Leader of the Scottish National Party (SNP) on two occasions, from 1990 to 2000 and from 2004 to 2014. He then served as leader of the Alba Party from 2021 until his death in 2024.

A graduate of the University of St Andrews, he worked as an economist in the Scottish Office, and later, the Royal Bank of Scotland. He was elected to the House of Commons in 1987, serving as the Member of Parliament (MP) for Banff and Buchan from 1987 to 2010. In 1990, he successfully defeated Margaret Ewing in the SNP leadership contest. Salmond led the party through the first election to the Scottish Parliament in 1999, where the SNP emerged as the largest opposition party. He was elected as the Member of the Scottish Parliament (MSP) for Banff and Buchan in that year's election. He resigned as leader in 2000 and stood down as an MSP the following year, when he was appointed leader of the SNP's Westminster group.

Salmond was re-elected as leader of the SNP in the 2004 leadership contest, after running on a joint ticket with Nicola Sturgeon. She led the SNP at Holyrood until Salmond was elected to the Scottish Parliament in 2007 for Gordon (later Aberdeenshire East). The SNP placed first, ahead of the governing Labour Party in the 2007 election by one seat, with Salmond securing support from the Scottish Greens, resulting in Salmond's appointment as first minister.

Salmond led an SNP minority government in his first term. His government passed landmark legislation, including the abolition of university tuition fees, the scrapping of prescription charges and commitment to renewable energy. Salmond was the first nationalist first minister.

At the 2011 Scottish Parliament election the SNP won with an overall majority, a feat previously thought almost impossible under the additional member system used in elections for the Scottish Parliament. As of 2024, this is the only election in which a party has won a majority in the Scottish Parliament. Salmond used this mandate to negotiate the Edinburgh Agreement which led to a 2014 referendum on Scottish independence that failed due to insufficient support. As a result, Salmond resigned and was succeeded by his deputy Sturgeon, who had led the Yes Scotland campaign during the referendum.

Returning to Westminster, Salmond was elected MP for Gordon in the 2015 general election. He was the SNP International Affairs and Europe spokesperson from 2015 to 2017. He left the House of Commons at the 2017 general election after losing his seat to the Scottish Conservative Party candidate Colin Clark. In August 2018, Salmond resigned from the party to fight allegations of rape and sexual assault, which he denied. In January 2019, he was charged with 14 offences, including attempted rape and sexual assault, but he was awarded compensation of £500,000 by the Scottish Government in August 2019 and later acquitted of all charges after trial in March 2020. In 2021, he criticised Sturgeon for her government's flawed investigations into these allegations which resulted in a political scandal. Salmond later was announced as the leader of a new pro-independence party, the Alba Party. The party failed to gain any seats in the 2021 national and 2022 local elections. He led the party until his death in 2024.

== Early life and education ==
Alexander Elliot Anderson Salmond was born at his parents' home at 101 Preston Road, Linlithgow, West Lothian, Scotland, on 31 December 1954. He was the second of four children born to Robert Fyfe Findlay Salmond and Mary Stewart Salmond (née Milne), both of whom were civil servants. Robert Salmond, who served in the Royal Navy during the Second World War, had originally worked as an electrician, and his family had been resident in Linlithgow since the mid-18th century. Salmond's grandmother, Abigail Ireland, married Alexander Salmond, one of six children to Robert Dobie Salmond and Margaret Elms, the daughter of Margaret Duncan and Henry Elms, a native of England.

Salmond's middle names come from his family's tradition of naming their children after the local Church of Scotland minister, in this case Gilbert Elliot Anderson of St Ninian's Craigmailen Parish Church in Linlithgow. He remained a member of the Church of Scotland his whole life.

From a young age, Salmond suffered very bad asthma. His parents were loving and caring and although he did not grow up poor, "money was tight" and the importance of education was emphasised in the family. Salmond was a skinny child, often referred to by his father as a "skink", as in cullen skink.

Salmond was educated at Linlithgow Primary School, before attending Linlithgow Academy from 1966 to 1972. He studied at Edinburgh College of Commerce from 1972 to 1973, gaining an HNC in Business Studies, and was then accepted by the University of St Andrews, where he studied Economics and Medieval History. During his time at St Andrews, Salmond lived in Andrew Melville Hall. He was elected as vice-president (education) of the students' representative council in 1977 and was also nominated to join St Andrews Community Council that year. Salmond graduated with a 2:2 Joint Honours MA in Economics and Medieval History in May 1978.

== Early career ==
After graduating in 1978, he entered the Government Economic Service (GES) as an assistant economist in the Department of Agriculture and Fisheries for Scotland, part of the now defunct Scottish Office. Two years later he joined the staff of the Royal Bank of Scotland, where he worked for seven years, initially as an assistant economist. In 1982 he was appointed oil economist, and from 1984 he worked as a bank economist as well as continuing to hold the position of oil economist. While with the Royal Bank, he wrote and broadcast extensively for both domestic and international outlets. He also contributed regularly to oil and energy conferences. In 1983, Salmond created a "Royal Bank/BBC oil index" that is still used.

== Early political years ==
Salmond became active in the SNP when he joined the Federation of Student Nationalists at the University of St Andrews in 1973. His conversion is generally credited to his then girlfriend, Debbie Horton, an English student from London, who was secretary of the St Andrews University Labour club. After an argument in December 1973, she told him: "If you feel like that, go and join the bloody SNP". The next day Salmond did. The following day he and a friend attended the sparsely populated AGM of the university branch of the Federation of Student Nationalists. Being the only two fully paid-up members of the SNP at the university, they were duly elected president and treasurer. Although a left-winger at the time he joined, Salmond had considerable doubts as to whether or not the Labour Government would legislate for a devolved Scottish Assembly.

Salmond started his political life as a committed left-winger inside the SNP and was a leading member of the socialist republican organisation within it, the 79 Group. He was, along with other group leaders, suspended from membership of the SNP when the 79 Group was banned within the larger party. In 1981, he married Moira French McGlashan, then a senior civil servant with the Scottish Office.

Following the SNP's National Council narrowly voting to uphold the expulsion, Salmond and the others were allowed back into the party a month later, and in 1985 he was elected as the SNP's Vice Convener for Publicity. In 1987 he stood for Parliament in Banff and Buchan and defeated the incumbent Conservative MP, Albert McQuarrie. Later that year Salmond became Senior Vice Convener (Deputy Leader) of the SNP. He was at this time still viewed as being firmly on the left of the party and had become a key ally of Jim Sillars, who joined him in the House of Commons when he won a by-election for the seat of Glasgow Govan in 1988. Salmond served as a member of the Energy and Climate Change Select Committee from 1987 to 1992.

== Leadership of the Scottish National Party ==
=== First tenure: 1990–2000 ===
Salmond taking the oath of office upon becoming elected an MSP to the Scottish Parliament, 1999

When Gordon Wilson stood down as SNP leader in 1990, Salmond decided to contest the leadership. His only opponent was Margaret Ewing, whom Sillars decided to support. This caused considerable consternation amongst the SNP left as the two main left leaders were opposing each other in the contest. Salmond went on to win the leadership election by 486 votes to Ewing's 146.

His first test as leader was the general election in 1992, with the SNP having high hopes of making an electoral breakthrough. Whilst considerably increasing its share of the vote, it failed to win a large number of seats. Sillars lost his, causing him to describe the Scottish people as '90-minute patriots'. This comment ended the political friendship between Salmond and Sillars, and Sillars would soon become a vocal critic of Salmond's style of leadership.

The SNP increased its number of MPs from four to six in the 1997 general election, which saw a landslide victory for the Labour Party. After election, Labour legislated for a devolved Scottish parliament in Edinburgh. Although still committed to a fully independent Scotland, Salmond signed the SNP up to supporting the campaign for devolution, and, along with Scottish Labour leader Donald Dewar and Scottish Liberal Democrat leader Jim Wallace, played an active part in securing the victory for devolution in the Scotland referendum of 1997. Many hardline fundamentalists in the SNP objected to committing the party to devolution, as it was short of full political Scottish independence.

Salmond's first spell as leader was characterised by a moderation of his earlier left-wing views and by his firmly placing the SNP into a gradualist, but still pro-independence, strategy. Salmond was one of the few politicians in the UK to oppose the NATO bombing of Serbia in 1999. He was opposed to the conflict because it was not authorised by a UN Security Council resolution, which was a controversial subject at the time. Despite this, Salmond was heavily criticised in the media for describing Tony Blair's decision to intervene militarily as an "unpardonable folly".

Several years as party leader earned Salmond an unusually high profile for an SNP politician in the London-based media. In 1998, Salmond won the Spectator Award for Political Strategist of the Year. Following an appearance on the entertainment programme Call My Bluff, Salmond used one of the 'bluff' cards that are used as props in the show in the run-up to the first elections to the Scottish Parliament. To counter his frustration at having to sit in silence through what he claimed was an inappropriately political speech by Tony Blair at a charity lunch, he held up the bluff card as the Prime Minister began querying Scotland's economic prospects should independence occur. Throughout his time in politics, Salmond has maintained his interest in horse racing, writing a weekly column for The Scotsman and appearing a number of times on Channel 4's The Morning Line. During the election campaign, Salmond was photographed feeding a young supporter a Solero ice cream during an event at Stirling University, creating a photograph that would become iconic.

=== Resignation as leader ===
Salmond was elected to the Scottish Parliament in 1999 and was one of its highest-profile members as leader of the largest opposition party. He stood down as SNP leader in 2000, facing internal criticism after a series of high-profile fall-outs with party members, and was replaced by his preferred successor John Swinney, who defeated Alex Neil for the post. He resigned from the Scottish Parliament on 14 May 2001 to lead the SNP group in the House of Commons.

During the prolonged parliamentary debates in the run-up to the 2003 invasion of Iraq he voiced strong opposition to the UK's participation. In the aftermath of the war, he lent support to the attempt of Adam Price, a Plaid Cymru MP, to impeach Tony Blair over the Iraq issue. Salmond went further than many anti-war politicians in claiming that Blair's statements on the presence of weapons of mass destruction in Iraq were consciously intended to deceive the public. He also claimed that Blair had made a pact with George W. Bush "to go to war come what may".

=== Subsequent return ===
After the June 2004 European Parliament elections, which were perceived as a "disaster" for the SNP, pressure mounted on Swinney to resign as leader. Swinney announced his resignation on 22 June 2004 to become Convener of the Scottish Parliament's European and External Relations Committee.

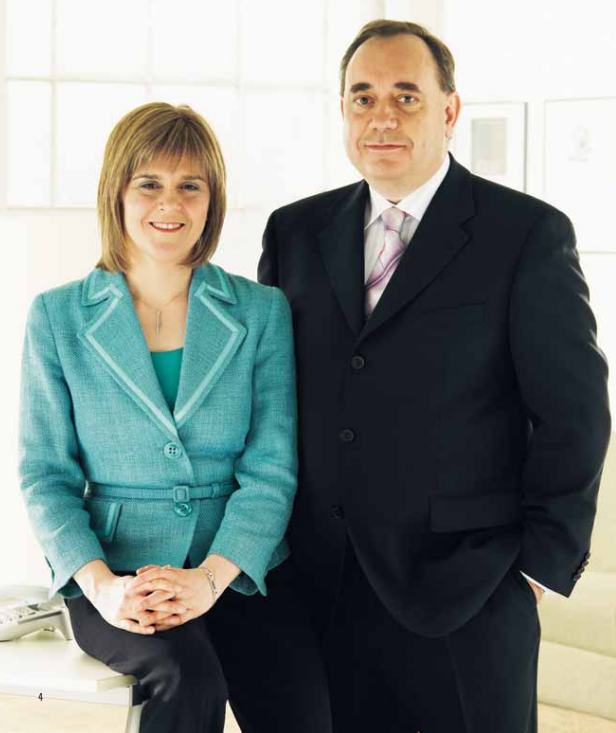
Salmond with his running mate and future deputy first minister, Nicola Sturgeon.

On 15 July 2004, Salmond said that he would be a candidate in the forthcoming election for the leadership of the SNP. This came as a surprise because he had previously declared that he would definitely not be a leadership candidate. In the postal ballot of all members he went on to receive over 75% of the votes cast, placing him well ahead of his nearest rival Roseanna Cunningham. As he was not an MSP at the time, his deputy, Nicola Sturgeon, took over as Leader of the SNP group and the main opposition leader at Holyrood. Although he was re-elected in the 2005 general election, he made clear his intention to return to the Scottish Parliament at the 2007 Scottish parliamentary election in an attempt to win power for the first time.

=== 2007 Scottish Parliament election ===
Salmond led the Scottish National Party through the 2007 election to the 3rd Scottish Parliament. In the election, Salmond stood as a candidate for the Gordon constituency, which had been represented since 1999 by the Liberal Democrat Nora Radcliffe. Salmond won the seat with 41% of the vote, and a majority of 2,062, returning to the Scottish Parliament after six years' absence. In the election the SNP emerged as the largest party, winning 47 seats to Labour's 46.

Having won more seats than any other party in the 2007 Scottish Parliament election, the SNP initially approached the Scottish Liberal Democrats to form a coalition, but they declined to take part in negotiations. This left the SNP without any possibility to form a coalition with an overall majority. Ultimately, the Scottish Green Party agreed to vote in an SNP minority government in return for concessions on climate policy and naming a Green to chair a committee.

== First Minister of Scotland (2007–2014) ==
=== First term: 2007–2011 ===
==== Entering government ====
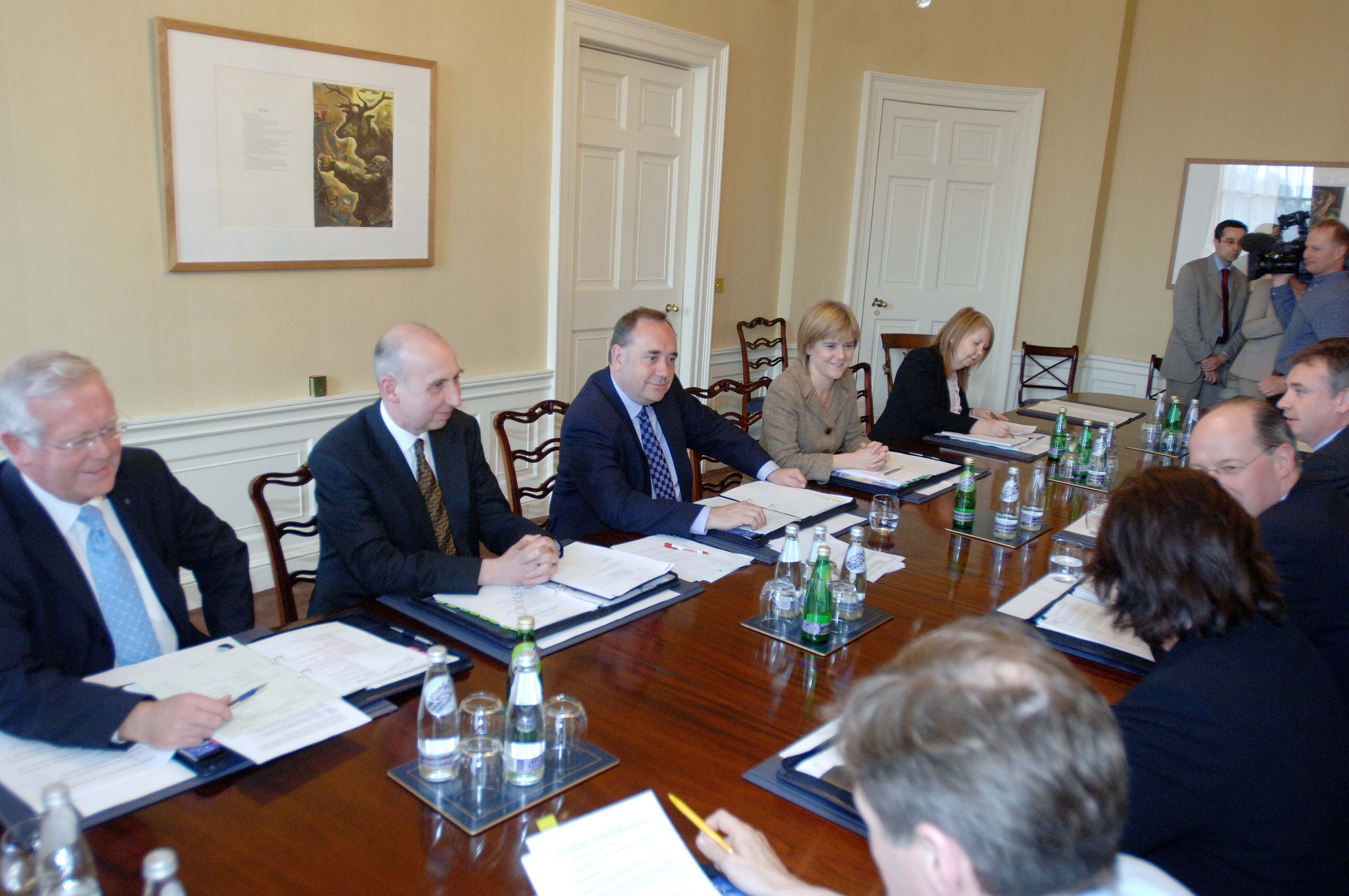
The first meeting of the Scottish cabinet under the First Salmond government, 22 May 2007

On 16 May 2007, with the support of the Greens, Salmond was elected by the Parliament to succeed Jack McConnell as First Minister of Scotland. The following day he received the Royal Warrant from the Queen and was officially sworn into office at the Court of Session in Edinburgh. Under section 45(7) of the Scotland Act 1998 he became Keeper of the Great Seal of Scotland at the same time. He was appointed to the British Privy Council four weeks later. Salmond became the first nationalist politician to hold the office of first minister. He appointed Sturgeon as his Deputy First Minister and reappointed Elish Angiolini as Lord Advocate, the first time a Lord Advocate had served two different governments.

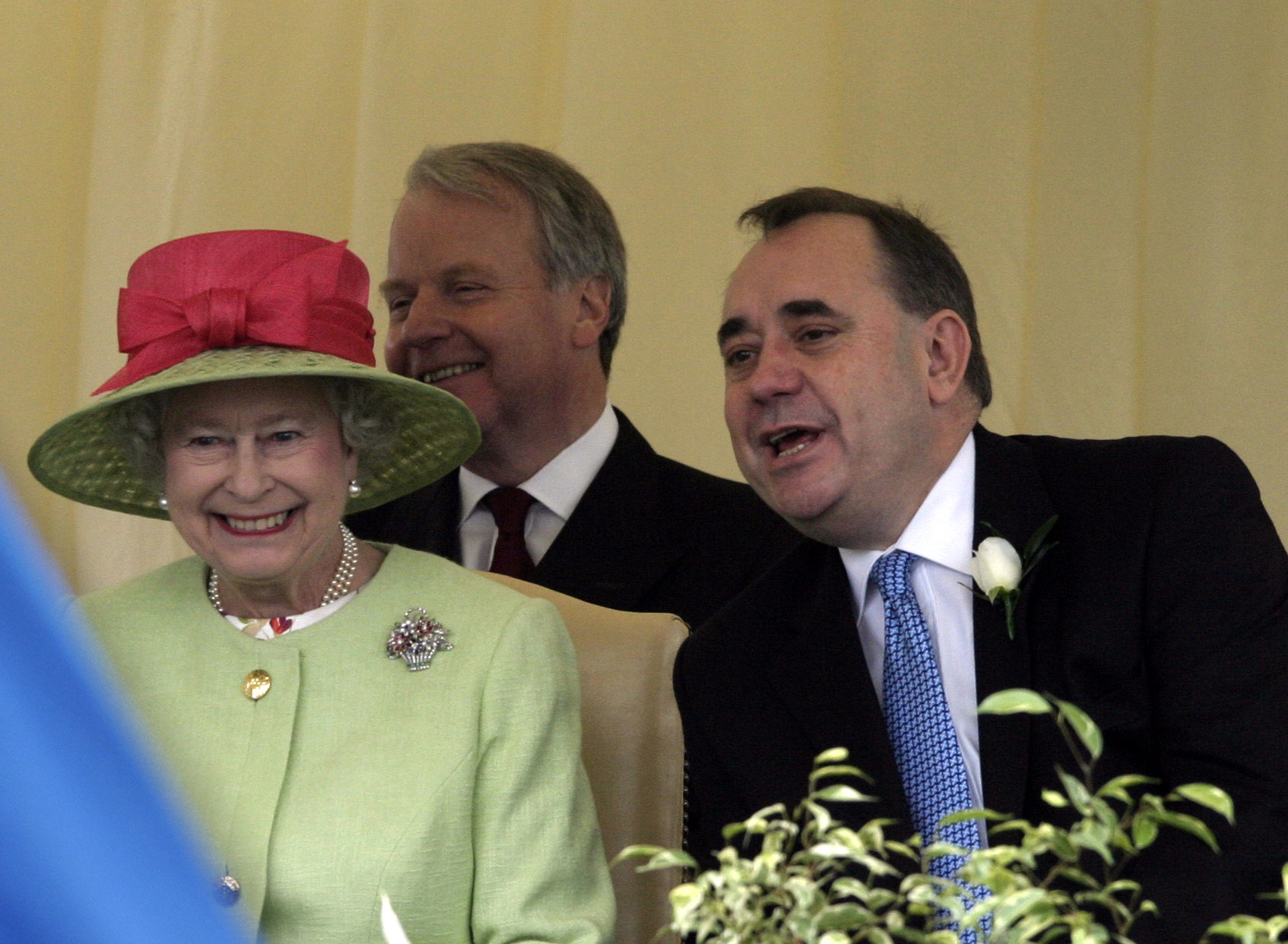
Salmond at the opening of the 3rd Scottish Parliament with Elizabeth II, 2007

Having won the largest number of seats in the general election (47 of 129), the SNP sought to form a coalition with the Scottish Liberal Democrats. When those talks failed, the SNP chose to form a one-party minority government. The SNP and Scottish Greens signed an agreement where the Greens supported SNP ministerial appointments, but did not offer support for any confidence or budget votes ("confidence and supply"). Due to the agreement signed with the Greens, Salmond's investiture vote was successful despite only having 47 of 129 seats in the Parliament. The vote was 49–46, with the SNP and Greens voting in favour and the 46 Scottish Labour MSPs voting against, with the Conservatives and Liberal Democrats abstaining.

Salmond reduced the size of the Scottish Cabinet from nine members to six, and said he would seek to govern on a "policy by policy" basis. In order to concentrate on his new role as First Minister, Salmond stood down as the SNP group leader at Westminster and was replaced by Angus Robertson. The Guardian reported in November 2007 that Salmond believed Scotland would be independent within "the next decade".

==== 2007 Glasgow Airport attacks ====
Salmond had been First Minister for just over a month when a vehicle rammed the front entrance of the main terminal building at Glasgow Airport on 30 June 2007, the first terrorist attack in Scotland since the Lockerbie bombing incident in December 1988. In a statement addressing the attacks in Glasgow, Salmond stated "terrorist acts are the work of individuals not communities and the arrival of terror on our soil must not result in racist attacks on ethnic minorities whose only crime is to share the same religion and colour as the bombers. It is to be hoped that yesterday's attack is an isolated incident, but the reality is that we will have to deal with more in the future. We must not allow terrorists to stop us from going about our lives as we always have – to do so would be to hand a victory to the men of terror."

Salmond issued a statement regarding the attacks in Edinburgh, calling for "the need for vigilance and unity against the forces of terror and rightly praised the work of the emergency services". Salmond called a meeting of the Scottish Government security advisers in St Andrew's House in Edinburgh, followed by a request from the Prime Minister Gordon Brown for Salmond, the Cabinet Secretary for Justice Kenny MacAskill and the Lord Advocate Elish Angiolini to attend an emergency COBRA meeting. By the evening of 30 June, Salmond had attended an online conference discussion with the prime minister of the United Kingdom Gordon Brown and his governmental cabinet.

==== 2008 financial crisis ====
During the 2008 financial crisis, Salmond claimed that the UK prime minister, Gordon Brown, was to blame for the trouble the economy had found itself in, claiming that the problem was "one created at 10 Downing Street". In April 2009, Salmond pledged £95 million in investment from the Scottish Government to aid economic recovery efforts. Salmond offered the Secretary of State for Scotland, Jim Murphy, to meet with the Scottish cabinet to discuss the economic challenges at a time he issued a warning to the UK Government about their plans to cut £1 billion in investment to the Scottish budget.

==== Scottish Independence proposals ====
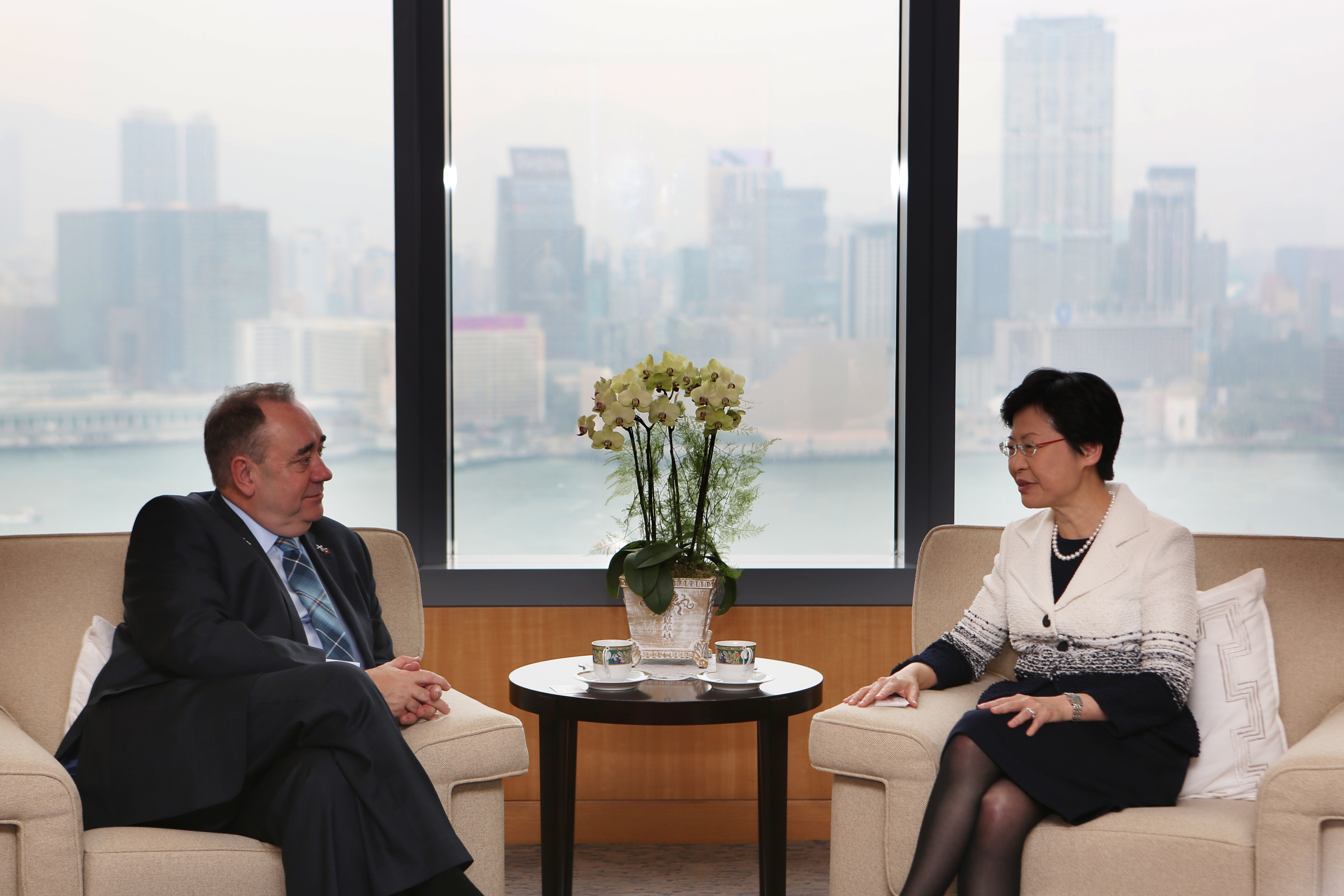
Salmond meets with Carrie Lam, Chief Secretary for Administration of Hong Kong

A white paper for an independence referendum, setting out four possible options ranging from no change to full independence, was published by the Scottish Government on 30 November 2009. A draft bill for public consultation was published on 25 February 2010, setting out a two-question yes/no referendum, proposing further devolution or full independence. Opposition parties issued statements claiming that they would not support the draft bill for public consultation on the issue of independence.

Following the 2011 Scottish Parliament election, in which the SNP won a majority of seats and forming the first majority Scottish Government in the parliaments existence, Salmond claimed that the majority obtained by the SNP was "a victory for a society and a nation", and later confirmed that an independence referendum would be held in the second half of the parliamentary term.

==== Renewable energy ====
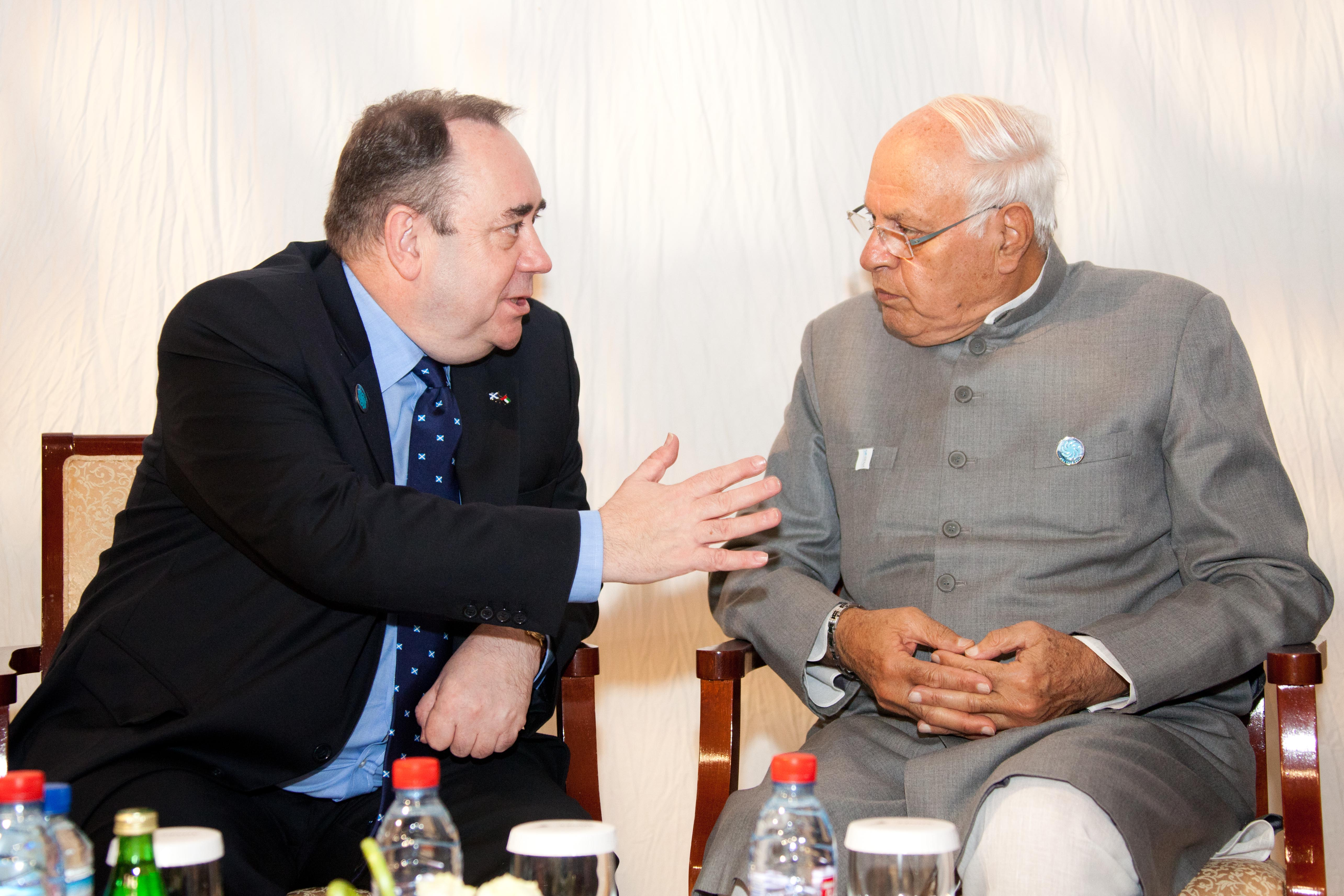
Salmond and the Minister for New and Renewable Energy of India, Farooq Abdullah, 2012

Salmond in his 2010 New Year message highlighted the importance of sustainable development and renewable energy in Scotland and the required increase in powers of the Scottish Parliament needed to help harness Scotland's green energy potential and therefore take full advantage of the "renewable revolution".

Earlier, in December 2009, he campaigned for climate change legislation at the UN Climate Change Conference in Copenhagen to promote Scotland's role in tackling and mitigating climate change. This included signing a Partnership Agreement with the Maldives, one of the most exposed countries to the consequences of rising sea levels.

In September 2010, Salmond proposed legislation that would give Scottish Water powers to build "green" power stations, windfarms and hydropower schemes in cooperation and competition with existing energy companies. He stated that this would make Scotland the 'world's first hydro-economy'.

==== 2011 Scottish Parliament election ====
Before the 2011 Scottish election, the SNP again pledged to hold an independence referendum if it won another term. The Westminster Labour government had initially designed the additional member system to make it impossible for one party to win an outright majority, but the SNP won enough seats from the other parties to take 69 seats, a majority of four. At this election, Salmond was re-elected for Aberdeenshire East, essentially a reconfigured version of Gordon.

=== Second term: 2011–2014 ===
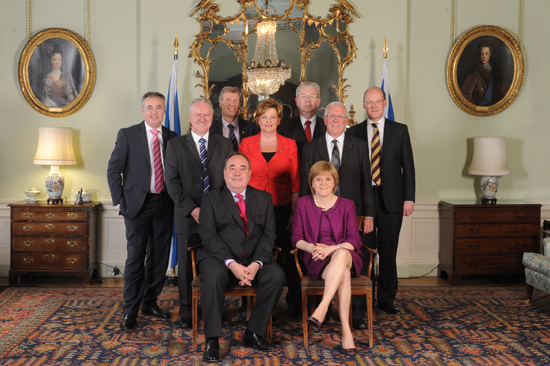
The Second Salmond government at Bute House, May 2011

The SNP's overall majority assured Salmond of another term as First Minister, and he was re-elected unopposed on 18 May 2011. This was the first single-party majority government in the history of the devolved parliament. Salmond's second government ended on 18 November 2014 upon his resignation. As a consequence of obtaining a majority, it gave Salmond the ability to call a referendum on Scottish independence. On 10 January 2012, the Scottish Government announced that they intended to hold the referendum in late 2014.

On 7 November 2012, Salmond surpassed the 2,001-day term of his predecessor, Jack McConnell. In September 2012, Salmond made a snap reshuffle in light of the 2014 Scottish independence referendum. Nicola Sturgeon and Alex Neil switched roles, with Sturgeon taking on responsibility for the independence referendum.

==== Programme for Government (2011) ====
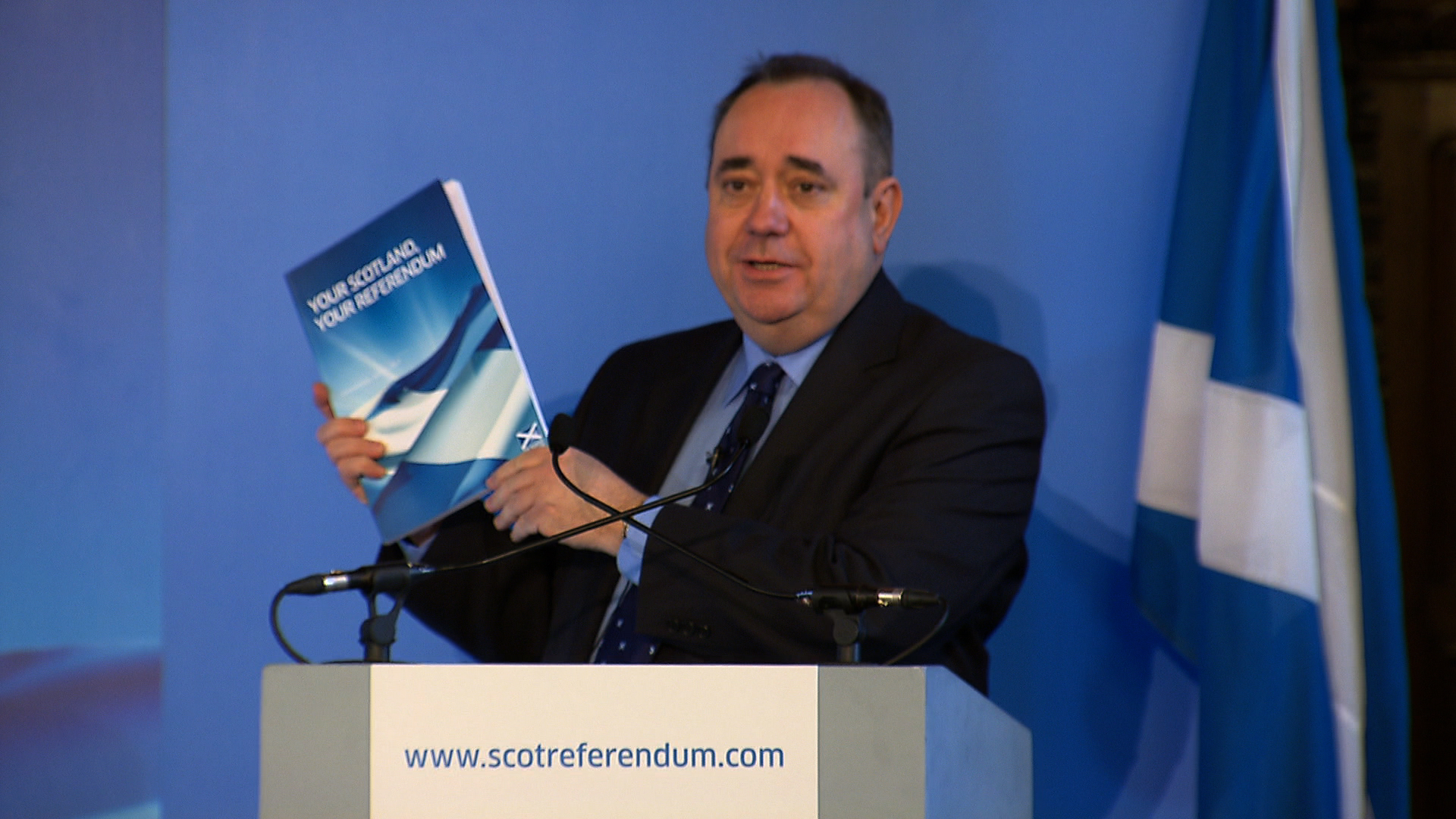
Salmond launches the Your Scotland, Your Referendum paper, January 2012

Salmond published his first programme for the Scottish Government following his re–election as first minister in September 2011. Entitled Renewing Scotland: The Government's Programme for Scotland 2011–2012, Salmond set out a number of key commitments for the Scottish Government ahead of the parliamentary term. Salmond further pledged to continue the freeze of council tax across Scotland in order to establish a "social wage", as well as driving work forward to deliver the governments commitment to the abolition of bridge tolls, free concessionary travel, prescription charges and personal care.

The most prominent aspect of the governments programme was on the constitutional question of Scottish independence, with the programme for government confirmed that a white paper would be published on the issue, and that a referendum on the issue would be held in the second half of the Scottish parliamentary term.

==== Independence referendum ====
An agreement was signed on 15 October 2012 by David Cameron and Salmond which provided a legal framework for the referendum to be held, and on 21 March 2013 the SNP government announced that the referendum would be held on 18 September 2014. Scotland's Future, a white paper setting out the Scottish Government's vision for an independent Scotland, was published on 26 November 2013.

==== Resignation as First Minister ====
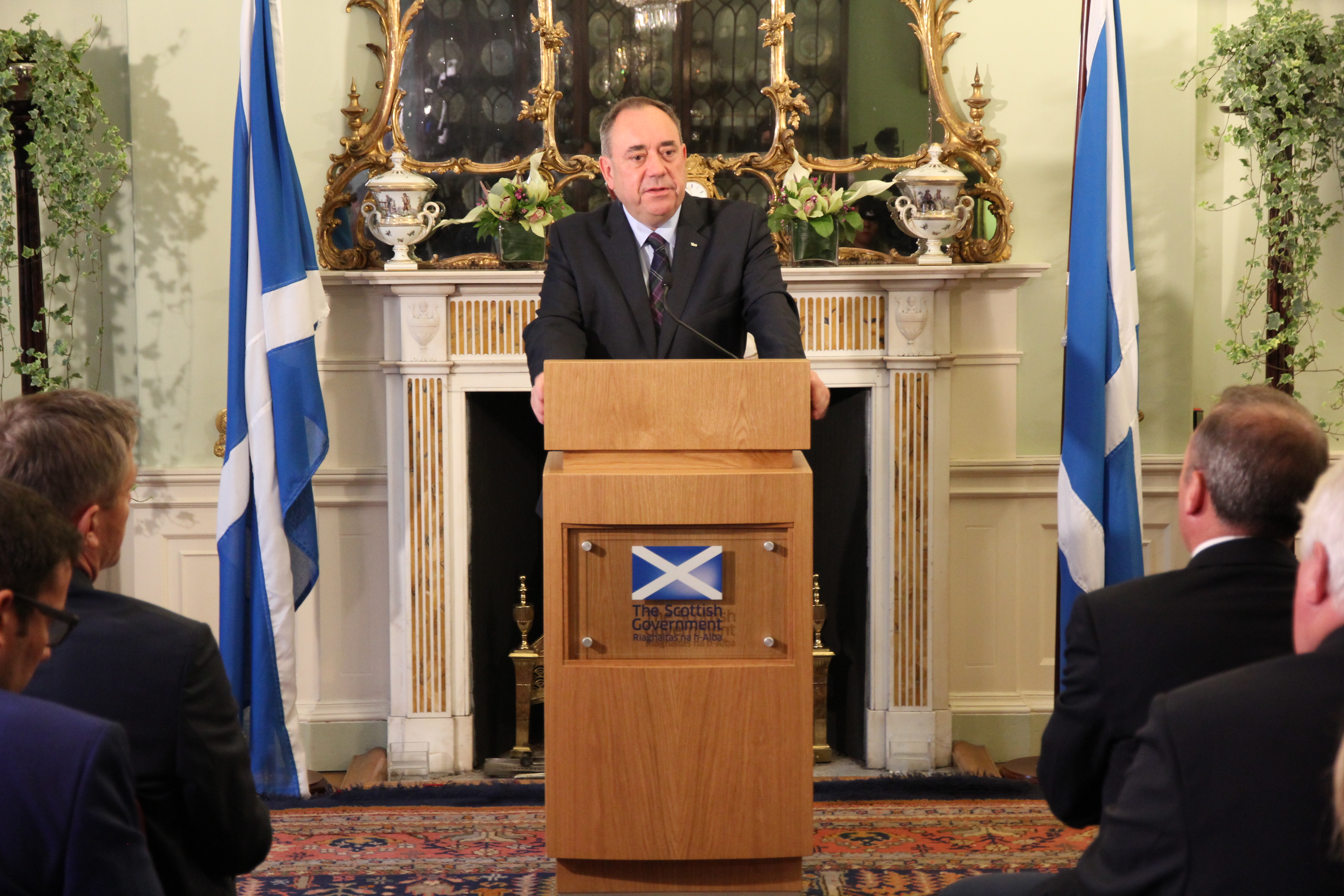
Salmond announces his resignation at Bute House, 19 September 2014

On 19 September 2014, following the results of the independence referendum which confirmed a majority of the Scottish people had voted against independence, Salmond announced that he would be resigning as First Minister in November 2014.

On 15 October, Deputy First Minister Nicola Sturgeon was the only candidate to stand for the leadership, and formally succeeded Salmond as SNP leader following the party's national conference in Perth on 14 November. Salmond submitted his resignation as First Minister to the Scottish Parliament and to the Queen on 18 November, and the formal selection of Sturgeon as his successor by the Scottish Parliament took place the following day.

My time as leader is nearly over, but for Scotland, the campaign continues and the dream shall never die.

— Alex Salmond

== Later career ==
=== Return to Westminster ===
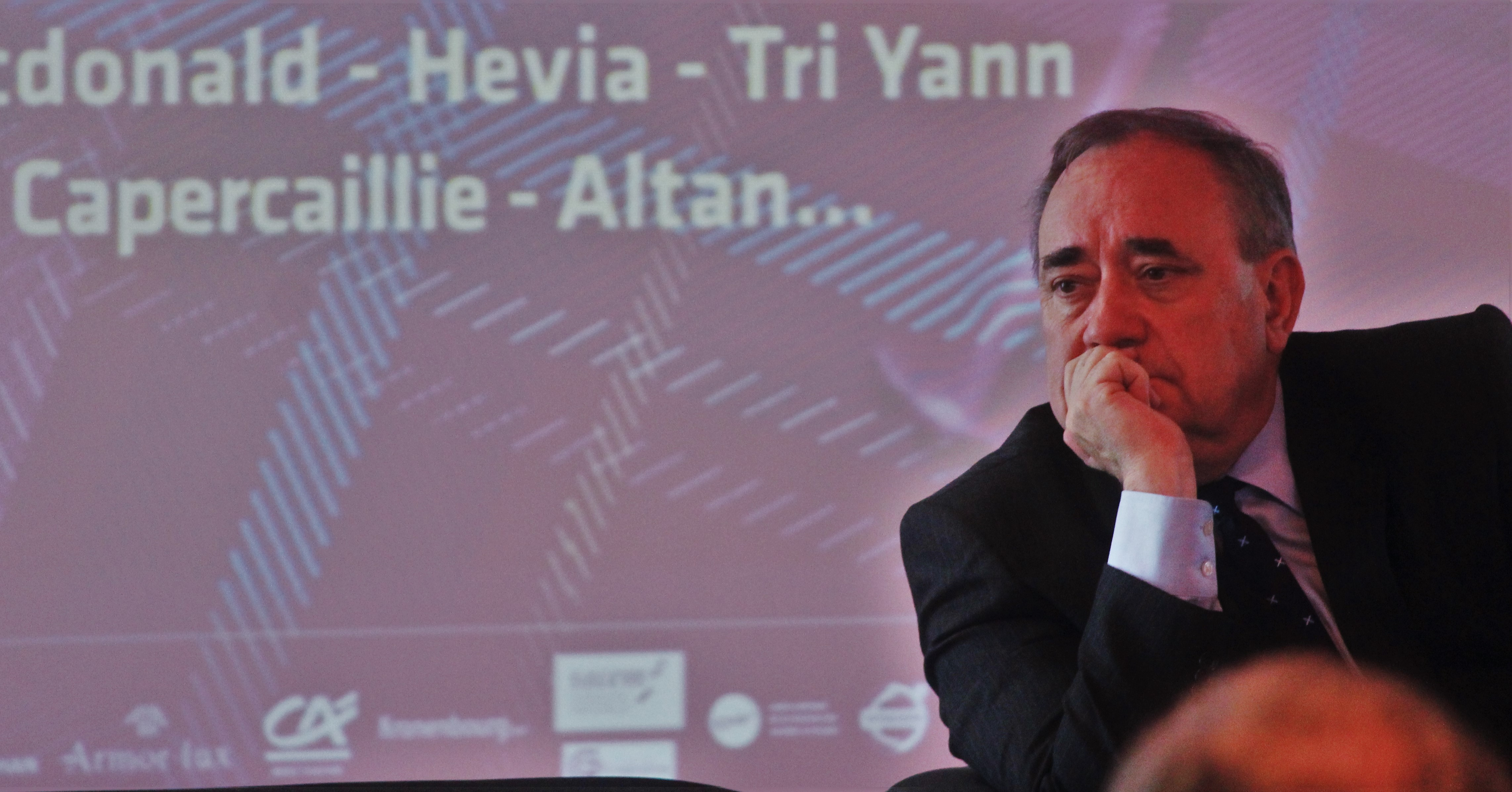
Salmond at the Festival Interceltique Lorient, 2017

On 7 December 2014, Salmond announced that he would stand as the SNP candidate for the Westminster constituency of Gordon in the 2015 May election. He indicated that he did not intend to replace Angus Robertson, MP for Moray, as the SNP leader in the House of Commons. Nicola Sturgeon, his successor as SNP leader and First Minister, repeatedly reminded voters at the March 2015 SNP conference that she, not he, was party leader after he gave interviews about his possible role in a hung parliament. After he declared his candidacy, he was described as a "bogeyman" (both by Lesley Riddoch and by himself), and was reportedly "demonised" by "Conservative propaganda" portraying Labour Party leader Ed Miliband "compliantly dancing to Salmond the piper's tune" after the election.

During the election campaign, Salmond recorded in his diary: "The Tory candidate, Colin Clark, cuts an impressive figure but his politics are far too dry for this area. If the constituency were composed entirely of michty fairmers [mighty farmers] then he might be the ideal candidate. But it isn't and he is not."

Salmond gained the seat of Gordon with 47.7% of the vote, replacing the Liberal Democrat Malcolm Bruce as the constituency's Westminster MP . On 13 May 2015, Salmond was appointed as the SNP's foreign affairs spokesman in the House of Commons. He tweeted that the party would advocate a "pro Europe", "pro developing world" and "against military adventurism" stance.

Following his return to the Commons he attracted media attention after telling Business Minister Anna Soubry during a debate, "Behave yourself, woman." Soubry said Salmond's attitude belonged "firmly in the 19th century". However, his then party leader, Nicola Sturgeon, defended the remarks and said, "It was in a boisterous House of Commons debate. The fundamental question, 'does that language indicate that Alex Salmond is sexist?' Absolutely not, there's no man I know who is less sexist."

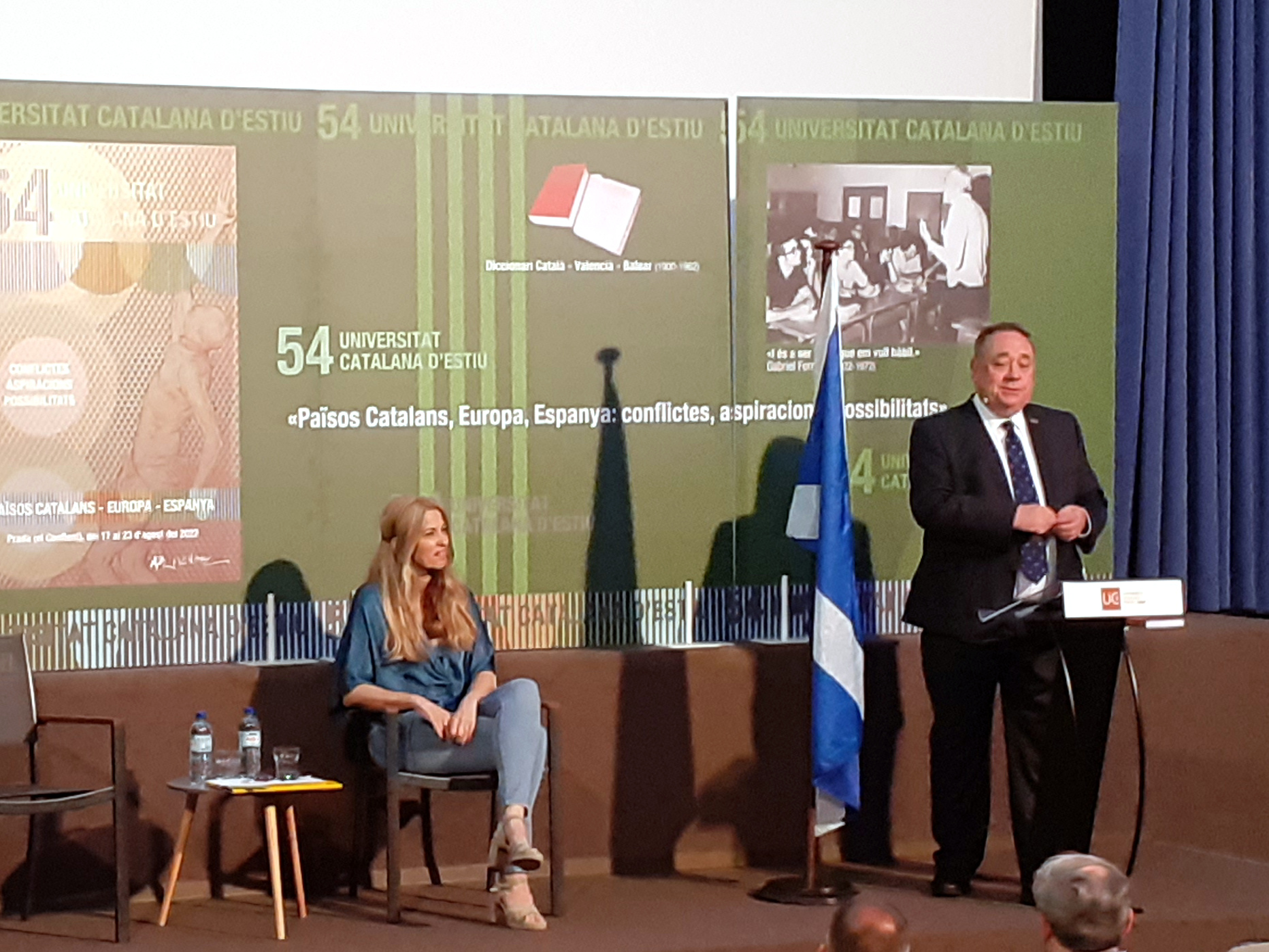
Salmond delivering a speech at the International Commission of European Citizens, 2022

In the 2017 British general election, Salmond's seat was widely watched as a potential Tory gain amid a nationwide backlash to Sturgeon's decision to call for a second independence referendum. The Scottish Conservatives had taken the most votes in the area at the 2017 local council elections, prompting party leader Ruth Davidson to say on a visit to Inverurie that, "We won the local government election in Gordon this week, beating the SNP into second place. It means that in this seat, as in many others, it is a two-horse race between us and the nationalists." In response to Davidson's comments, Salmond riposted, "It's just arrogance, for Ruth Davidson to continue the line of 'we're going to take this seat, and we're going to take that seat'. Once it doesn't happen, it's very bad news for Ruth Davidson's credibility."

On election night, Salmond lost his seat as member for Gordon to Colin Clark of the Conservatives, receiving 19,254 votes to the Conservatives' 21,861. This represented a swing of 20.4% away from Salmond, larger than the 14.4% swing to him from the Liberal Democrats which saw him win the seat in the 2015 election. It also marked first time since the 1987 general election that Salmond was not in an elected position in either the British or Scottish parliament.

=== Broadcasting ===
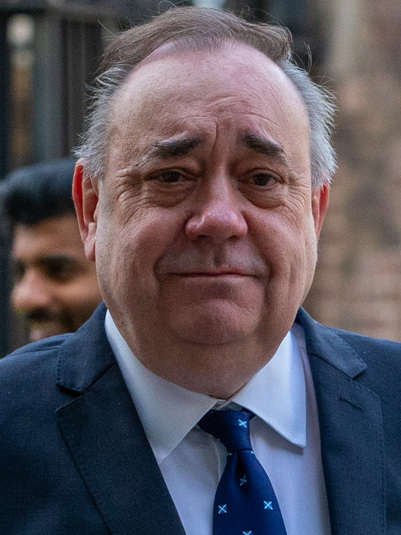
Salmond at the Accession Council of King Charles III of the United Kingdom and the other Commonwealth realms, 2022

On 9 November 2017, the RT channel (formerly known as Russia Today) announced he would host a show called The Alex Salmond Show on the network. Salmond's successor as Scotland's first minister and SNP leader, Nicola Sturgeon, said she would have advised against his decision to broadcast for the channel. Salmond was criticised by Scottish politicians from the other parties for a perceived lack of judgement. His long-time protege Tasmina Ahmed-Sheikh, who was elected alongside him in 2015 and lost her seat when he did, also starred in the show, which was produced by Slainte Media, a production company co-owned by Ahmed-Sheikh and Salmond. The first show was broadcast on 16 November 2017; the main interviewee was Carles Puigdemont, the former president of Catalonia. In February 2022, Salmond announced that his show on RT had been suspended, following the 2022 Russian invasion of Ukraine.

On 11 July 2023, more than a year after The Alex Salmond Show ended, Salmond started a new show on all social media platforms, Scotland Speaks with Alex Salmond, seen as a natural successor to The Alex Salmond Show that was also hosted by Salmond and Ahmed-Sheikh and produced by Slainte Media. It first aired on 13 July 2023 and featured a similar format to the show albeit having a smaller budget and studio. In February 2024, the show returned on the Turkish public broadcaster TRT. The first episode included an interview with actor Brian Cox.

=== Sexual misconduct allegations ===
==== Trial and acquittal ====
In August 2018, he resigned from the SNP in the face of allegations of sexual misconduct in 2013 while he was First Minister. In a statement he said that he wanted to avoid internal division within the party and intended to apply to rejoin the SNP once he had an opportunity to clear his name.

On 30 August 2018, he launched a crowdfunding appeal to pay for the legal costs of seeking a judicial review into the fairness of the process by which the Scottish Government has handled the allegations. He closed the appeal two days later, on 1 September, after raising £100,000, double the amount he wanted, to pay for his legal costs. The government later conceded that its procedures had been flawed and paid more than £500,000 in Salmond's legal expenses. On 8 January 2019, he won his inquiry case against Scottish government, noting, "while I am glad about the victory which has been achieved today, I am sad that it was necessary to take this action." The Scottish government admitted it breached its own guidelines by appointing an investigating officer who had "prior involvement" in the case. Salmond also asked permanent secretary to the Scottish Government, Leslie Evans, to consider her position. Evans stated that the complaints the government had received in January 2018 had not been withdrawn, so the option of re-investigating them remained on the table, once the police probe into the allegations had run its course.

On 24 January 2019, Police Scotland arrested Salmond, and he was charged with 14 offences, including two counts of attempted rape, nine of sexual assault, two of indecent assault, and one of breach of the peace. He appeared in court on 21 November and entered a plea of "not guilty". The trial started on 9 March 2020; his defence was led by Gordon Jackson, and the prosecution was led by Alex Prentice.

On 23 March 2020, Salmond was cleared of all charges. A jury found him not guilty of 12 charges, one charge had been dropped by prosecutors earlier in the trial, and one charge was found not proven.

In May 2021 The Times reported that Salmond was writing a book about his trial.

==== Scottish Government complaints ====
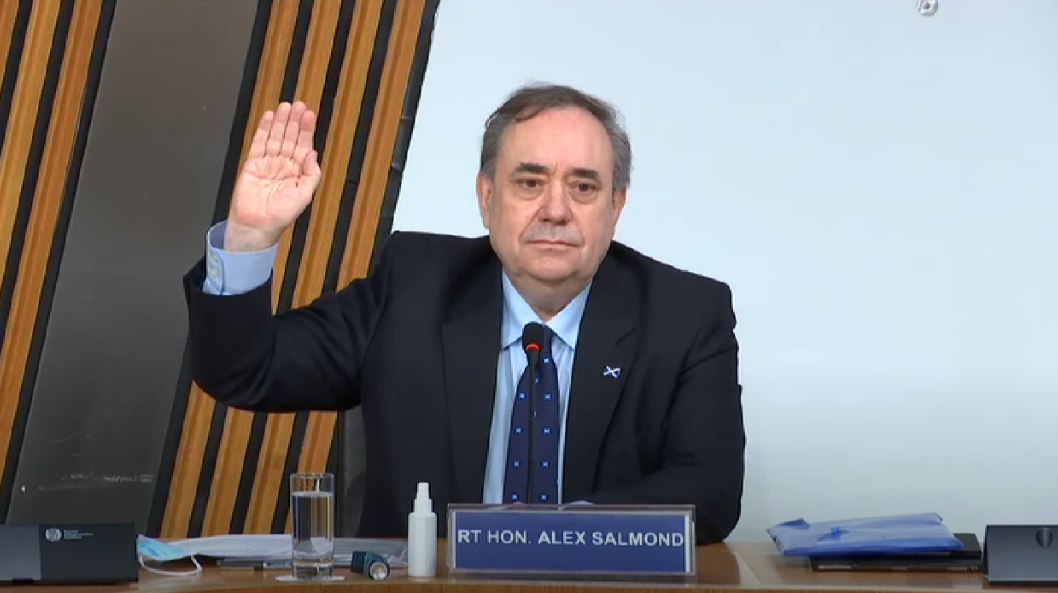
Salmond attending the Committee on the Scottish Government Handling of Harassment Complaints at the Scottish Parliament, February 2021

The Scottish Parliament set up the Committee on the Scottish Government Handling of Harassment Complaints to investigate how the Government breached its own guidelines in its original investigation into the harassment claims against Salmond, and then lost a judicial review into their actions and had to pay over £500,000 to Salmond for legal expenses. A political row developed over what evidence to this committee Salmond could present. Giving evidence in person in February 2021, Salmond claimed that senior figures in the Scottish Government and the SNP plotted to remove him from public life and to send him to prison. Sturgeon disputed the allegations.

Sturgeon initially told parliament that she had first heard of the complaints against Salmond when he told her of them on 2 April 2018. However, 18 months later, she revised her account, saying she had forgotten about an earlier meeting, on 29 March 2018, in which Salmond's former chief of staff Geoff Aberdein told her about the complaints. Critics have described this as a possible breach of the ministerial code, which states that any minister who deliberately misleads parliament should resign. The 29 March meeting was not recorded: meetings on government business are meant to be recorded, but Sturgeon has said this is because it was an SNP meeting. In his evidence to the committee, Salmond said there was "no doubt" that Sturgeon had broken the ministerial code in not revealing the 29 March meeting sooner and in not recording what was really a meeting about government business. Sturgeon denies any wrongdoing.

Documents and emails published on 2 March 2021 showed that two people supported Salmond's assertion that the meeting was convened as a government, not party, matter. The publication also backed up Salmond's allegation that the identity of one of his accusers had been passed to his former chief of staff, contradicting Sturgeon's statement that "to the very best of my knowledge I do not think that happened". They also confirmed that the government had pursued the legal case against Salmond after being advised by lawyers that it was likely to fail.

The Times reported that MSPs also heard that staff felt, "shamed because they were expected to tie Salmond's shoelaces, straighten his tie, apply hand sanitiser to him and comb his hair and remove dandruff."

Irish lawyer James Hamilton conducted a separate investigation into whether Sturgeon breached the ministerial code and concluded that she did not, with the caveat that: "It is for the Scottish parliament to decide whether they were in fact misled".

=== Alba Party ===
On 26 March 2021, Salmond announced he had joined and become leader of the Alba Party, a new pro-independence party, to contest the upcoming 2021 Scottish Parliament election. He was Alba's lead candidate on the North East Scotland list. While campaigning, he told The New Yorker that he did not want to destroy Nicola Sturgeon. "If I wanted to destroy her, that could have been done," he claimed. Alba polled 44,913 votes (1.7%) in total, and won zero seats. In Salmond's own region, they received 8,269 votes (2.3%). Despite a poor showing, Salmond pledged the party would continue campaigning. He also claimed that the party had established itself as a political force in only six weeks and would remain on the political scene.

Alba fielded 111 candidates at the 2022 Scottish local elections, including thirteen who had defected since 2017, but none of them won a seat. The following week, Salmond stated that all pro-independence parties needed to work together if Scottish independence was to be achieved. He said that the proposed 2023 independence referendum would need to take place, but if it did not, then there would be huge political change in Scotland, in which Alba would play a strong part.

For the 2024 general election, Alba put up 20 candidates across Scotland, including their sitting MPs: Neale Hanvey and Kenny MacAskill, both formerly of the SNP. Salmond himself was not a candidate, saying that it was his intention to contest the Banffshire and Buchan Coast seat at the 2026 Scottish Parliament election. Alba failed to win any seats, and all candidates lost their deposits. Salmond said that he voted for the SNP in Aberdeenshire North and Moray East, due to Alba not standing a candidate there.

=== Relations with SNP post–Sturgeon ===
Following the resignation of Nicola Sturgeon, his successor as SNP Leader and First Minister, Salmond was accused by leadership candidate Humza Yousaf of making "numerous comments and interventions in the 2023 Scottish National Party leadership election".

Salmond endorsed the two losing candidates, Kate Forbes and Ash Regan, Regan was seen as being close to Salmond's Alba Party: her campaign was run by a Salmond staffer who ran against the SNP as an Alba candidate the year prior, and the only SNP parliamentarian to endorse her is close to Salmond. During the campaign, Regan insisted she had no interest in joining Alba, and would never join that party; despite this, less than six months after coming last in the contest, she defected to Alba, becoming the first MSP ever to directly defect from one party to another.

Salmond was critical of Humza Yousaf, the eventual victor, widely considered the candidate most supportive of Sturgeon's progressive policies, who had served as a minister under Salmond. While Forbes was outspoken that she would have voted against gay marriage, Yousaf, a practicing Muslim, said that he does not "legislate on the basis of [his] faith". Salmond repeated the accusation that Yousaf, the only leadership candidate who had been an MSP at the time of that vote, had missed the final vote due to pressure from religious people, although Yousaf did vote in support of the Bill at other stages. The SNP Westminster Deputy Leader Mhairi Black credited this to Salmond's support for Yousaf's rival candidates.

Following Yousaf's selection as First Minister, Salmond continued his criticisms, calling on Yousaf, to "sweep that nonsense [Sturgeon's policy agenda] away" and change direction, and for Yousaf to end the power-sharing agreement with the Greens which kept the SNP in office. In 2024, Yousaf expressed his regret and disappointment at the breakdown of his relationship with Salmond, whom he had previously admired, saying Salmond "now spends a fair bit of his time laying the boot into the SNP and trying to damage me", adding: "It feels difficult to think that [his motivations] are anything other than to try and replace the SNP which is never going to happen."

== Personal life and death ==
=== Personal life ===
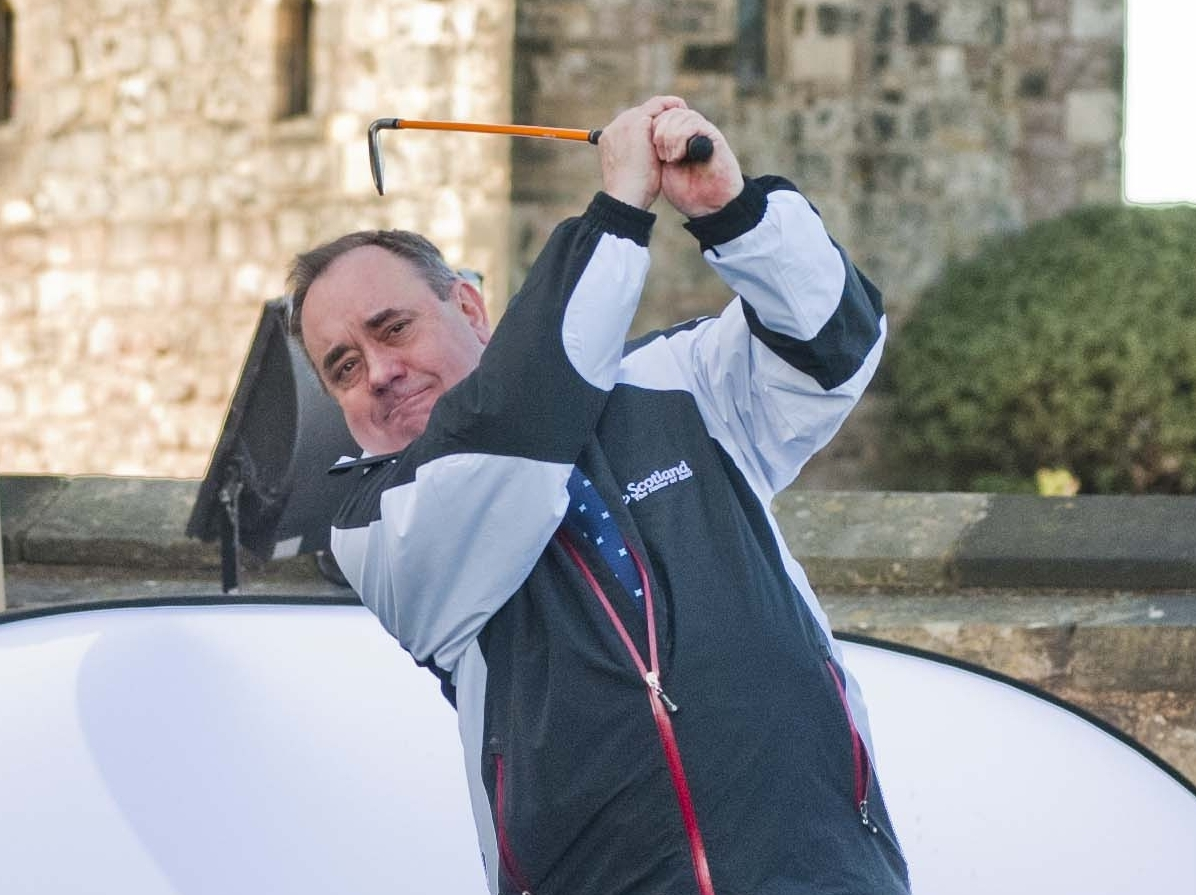
Salmond frequently enjoyed playing golf during his spare time

Salmond married Moira McGlashan in 1981. Moira was a senior civil servant 17 years his senior, and became his boss when he joined the Scottish Office in the 1970s. They had no children. They closely protected their private lives and lived in a converted mill in Strichen, Aberdeenshire.

Salmond was a member of the Church of Scotland and considered himself to be a religious man.

Salmond's main interests outside of work and politics were golf, horse racing, football, and reading. He succeeded Robin Cook as a racing tipster for Glasgow's Herald newspaper. He supported the Scotland national football team and Heart of Midlothian FC, and sometimes attended matches. He also took an interest in Scottish cultural life, as well as watching Star Trek and listening to country music.

=== Death ===
Salmond died on 12 October 2024, at the age of 69. He was in Ohrid, North Macedonia, and had spoken at the Gjorge Ivanov School for Young Leaders earlier that day alongside Tasmina Ahmed-Sheikh. Government officials in North Macedonia said that he had fallen ill and collapsed at the Inex Olgica Hotel at around 15:30 CEST, and was later pronounced dead at the scene; his body was sent for autopsy to determine the cause of death. According to eyewitness Mark Donfried, the director of the Academy for Cultural Diplomacy, Salmond and the rest of the forum were eating lunch when Ahmed-Sheikh, who was sitting next to Salmond, struggled to open a bottle of ketchup. Salmond reached over offering to help, and as he attempted to open the bottle he suddenly collapsed to the floor. The former chief executive of the stock exchange of Cyprus, who was sitting on Salmond's other side, rushed to his aid but stated he was already unconscious. Paramedics attempted to resuscitate Salmond for half an hour but were unsuccessful. Following the announcement of his death, flags at the Scottish Parliament Building in Edinburgh were lowered to half mast upon the request of the Presiding Officer Alison Johnstone. Flags at Scottish Government buildings also flew at half mast upon the announcement of his death, and again on the day of both his funeral and whilst the Scottish Parliament was debating the Motion of Condolence to Salmond on 30 October.

His family paid tribute to him via the release of an official statement on 13 October, saying he was "a devoted and loving husband, a fiercely loyal brother, a proud and thoughtful uncle and a faithful and trusted friend", and vowed to continue his long–standing work and desire to achieve Scottish independence, citing his same words used when he resigned as first minister, "the dream shall never die". Following a post-mortem examination, on 14 October, the Alba Party, which Salmond led until his death, confirmed his cause of death as a heart attack.

Salmond's remains were repatriated to Aberdeen on board a flight chartered by the Scottish businessman Tom Hunter on 18 October.

==== Reactions ====
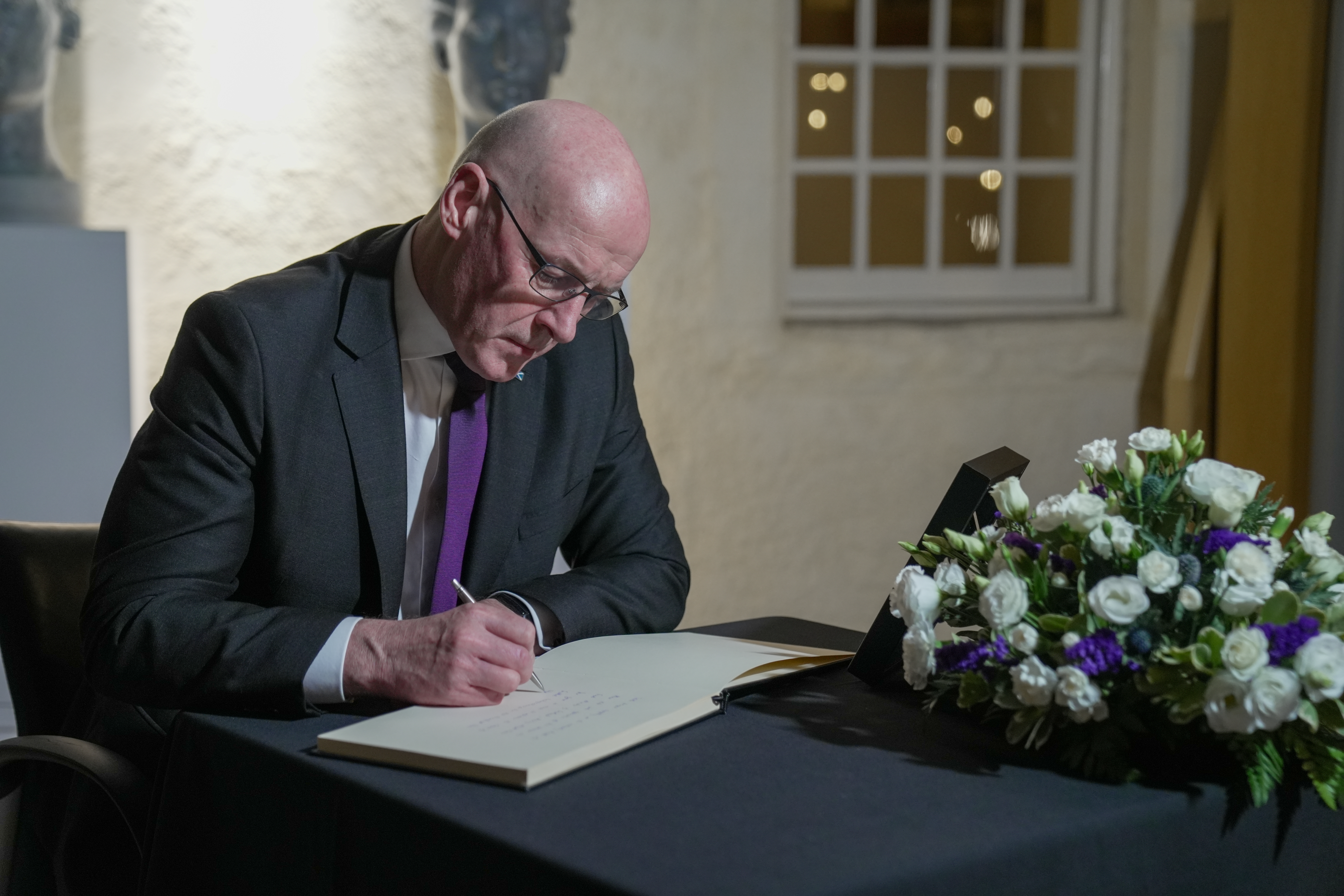
First Minister John Swinney signs the Book of Condolence for Salmond in the Scottish Parliament, 15 October

Described by STV News as "one of the biggest figures in modern Scottish politics", tributes began to be paid to Salmond and his political career shortly after the announcement of his death. Buckingham Palace issued a statement from King Charles III which read "my wife and I are greatly saddened to hear of the sudden death of Alex Salmond. His devotion to Scotland drove his decades of public service." First Minister of Scotland John Swinney said that he was "deeply shocked and saddened at the untimely death", adding that he "made an enormous contribution to political life—not just within Scotland, but across the UK and beyond". The prime minister of the United Kingdom, Keir Starmer, said that Salmond "leaves behind a lasting legacy", citing his stature as a "monumental figure of Scottish and UK politics over 30 years".

Salmond's close political associate, and his successor as first minister, Nicola Sturgeon, with whom his relations had deteriorated in the years prior to his death, said that she was "shocked and sorry" upon hearing of Salmond's death. She further added "Obviously, I cannot pretend that the events of the past few years which led to the breakdown of our relationship did not happen, and it would not be right for me to try". She later added "it remains the fact that for many years Alex was an incredibly significant figure in my life. He was my mentor, and for more than a decade we formed one of the most successful partnerships in UK politics".

Other tributes were paid to Salmond by the former president of North Macedonia Gjorge Ivanov, who referred to Salmond as his "friend who demonstrated the passion and dedication that characterised his life and work", Secretary of State for Scotland, Ian Murray, who claimed it was "impossible to overstate the impact Alex Salmond had on Scotland and on our politics", Joanna Cherry, former SNP MP who served with Salmond in the UK Parliament, the former leader of the Scottish Conservatives Douglas Ross and the political broadcaster Andrew Neil.

The Scottish Football Association (SFA) confirmed that a minute's applause would be held for Salmond ahead of the Scotland national football team's 2024–25 UEFA Nations League A match against Portugal held at Hampden Park on 15 October 2024.

==== Arrangements ====
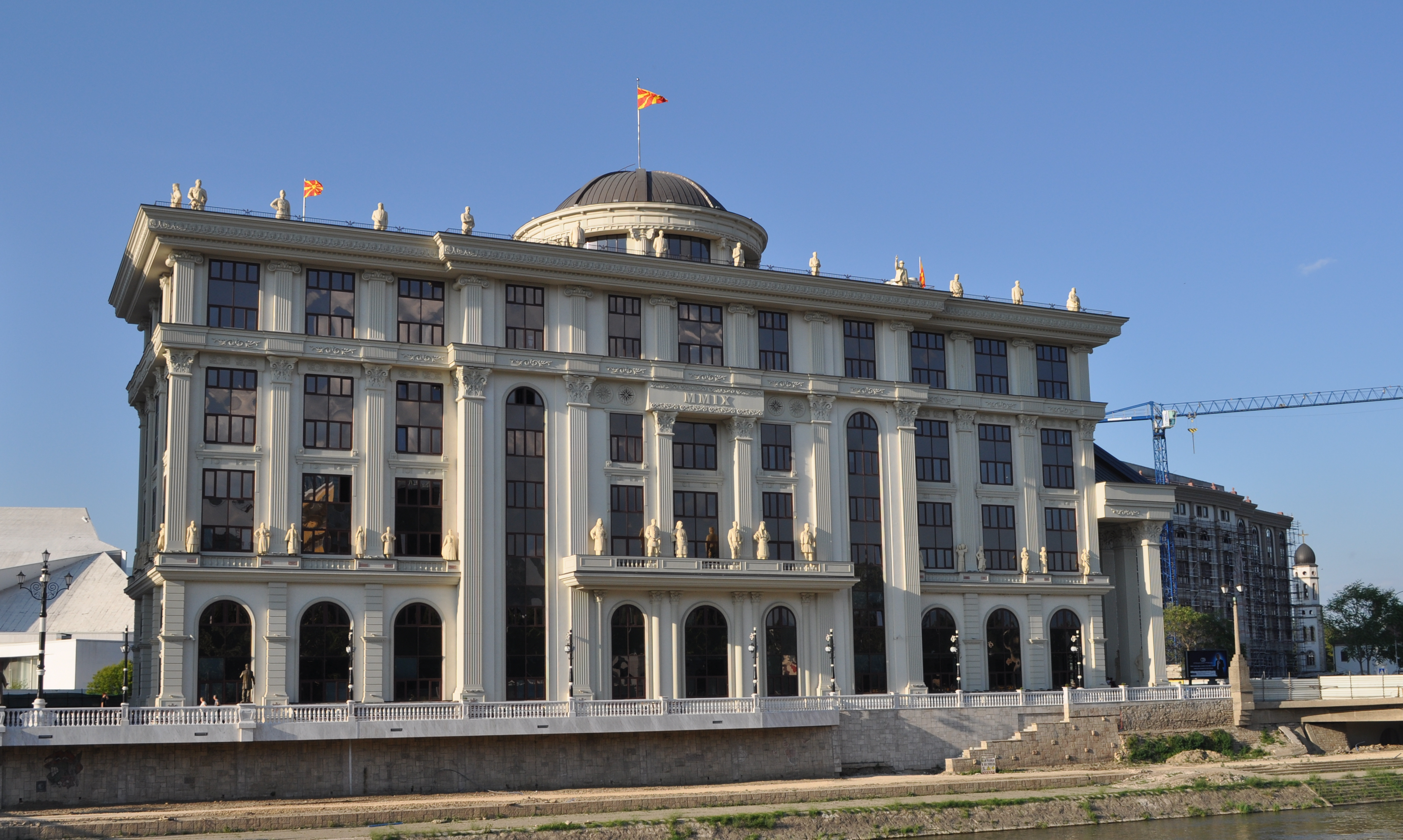
The Ministry of Foreign Affairs of North Macedonia had to complete "technical work" prior to his body being returned to Scotland

On 14 October, two days following his death, arrangements began in order to repatriate Salmond's remains to Scotland. A series of "lengthy engagements" occurred between Deputy First Minister of Scotland, Kate Forbes, and the UK government's Minister of State for Europe, North America and Overseas Territories, Stephen Doughty, about the repatriation of his body from North Macedonia. Kenny MacAskill, Salmond's depute leader of the Alba Party who succeeded the party leadership on an acting basis following his death, expressed his gratitude towards both the Scottish Government and UK Government for their work in arranging Salmond's return to Scotland, and also publicly thanked the Macedonian Government for their "expediting" of the process.

As Salmond died overseas, a number of events had to take place prior to his body being returned to Scotland. The Ministry of Foreign Affairs of North Macedonia had to wait for specific arrangements to be agreed by the Scottish Government regarding a flight to return Salmond's body to Scotland, with both the Scottish Government and Macedonian Government stating they were "working closely" in order to provide support to his family. There had been pressure on the UK Government to draft in the Royal Air Force (RAF) in order to repatriate Salmond's body from North Macedonia, which would cost an estimated £600,000.

His family attended the Scottish Parliament on 15 October to see a book of condolence which had been opened up to the public wishing to pay their respects to Salmond. Discussions were still taking place on 15 October between the Alba Party, Scottish Government and UK Government regarding the best return of his body, however, by the evening of 15 October, Macedonian government officials confirmed that his "body is ready to be flown home back to Scotland". The Ministry of Foreign Affairs confirmed that the “technical work" which required to be completed regarding his repatriation had been completed, and that they were "waiting for information regarding the departure time from the Scottish side".

On 16 October, it was announced that plans to draft in the RAF to fly his body back to Scotland was rejected on the fear that it would break RAF protocol of only flying deceased members of the royal family back to the United Kingdom; instead, it was initially speculated that the Scottish Government would pay the cost to charter a flight to return Salmond's body. It was later confirmed that a private individual would pay the sum for Salmond's body to be returned on a private flight. It was subsequently revealed that the private individual responsible for financing the repatriation of Salmond's body was the Scottish businessman Tom Hunter.

Salmond's body left North Macedonia on 18 October with his coffin draped in the flag of Scotland by his colleague Tasmina Ahmed-Sheikh. As the coffin approached the plane to return to Scotland, it was given a guard of honour by the Army of North Macedonia. His body returned in Scotland at around 2pm GMT following the flights landing at Aberdeen Airport, in which his arrival was marked by members of his family and the acting leader of the Alba Party, Kenny MacAskill, with a lone piper playing as the coffin disembarked the plane. A group of bikers, known as the "Yes Bikers", led Salmond's cortège to a funeral home in Fraserburgh.

==== Funeral ====
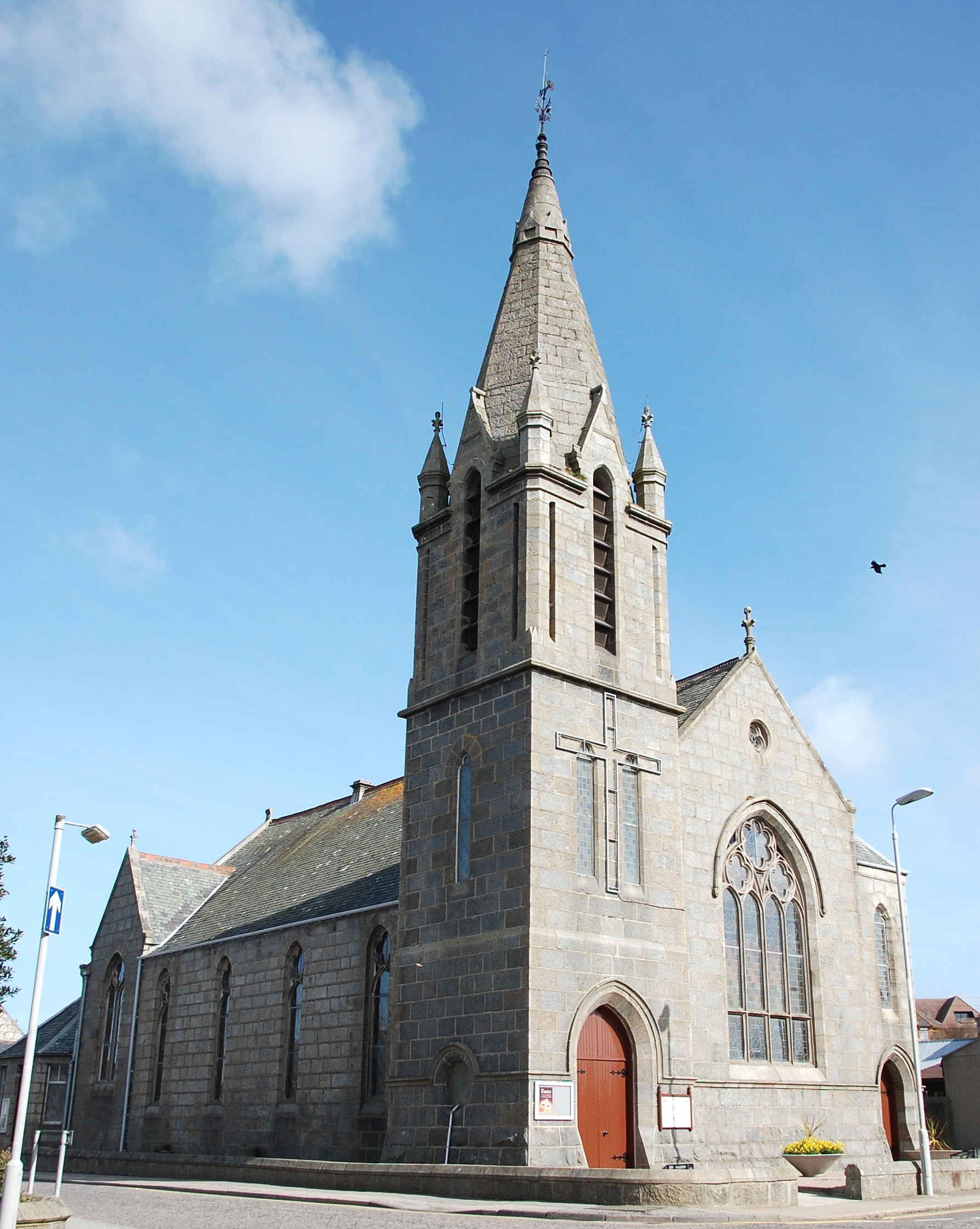
Salmond's funeral was held at Strichen Parish Church.

A private funeral service took place for Salmond on 29 October 2024 at Strichen Parish Church in Strichen, Aberdeenshire, where he resided until his death. The service was attended by members of Salmond's family and friends, including Alba Party chairwoman Tasmina Ahmed-Sheikh, former Speaker of the House of Commons John Bercow, MSPs Fergus Ewing and Annabelle Ewing, former MSP and Cabinet Secretary in Salmond's governments Alex Neil, former Deputy Leader of the Scottish National Party Jim Sillars, former MP Joanna Cherry, leader of the Alba Party in the Scottish Parliament Ash Regan and acting leader of the Alba Party Kenny MacAskill.

Salmond's successor as first minister, Nicola Sturgeon, and incumbent first minister John Swinney, both of whom previously served in Salmond's cabinets during his tenure as first minister, did not attend the private funeral service. A statement issued by the Scottish Government confirmed that their absence from the funeral service were "in line with the wishes of Salmond's family". The Scottish Government said in the statement that the "thoughts of the first minister and the Scottish Government are with Salmond's family". A source linked to the Alba Party claimed that there would "not be a chance in hell" that Sturgeon would be invited to Salmond's funeral or public memorial event to be held at a later date as a result of their feud and fallout in the years leading to Salmond's death.

==== Memorial service ====
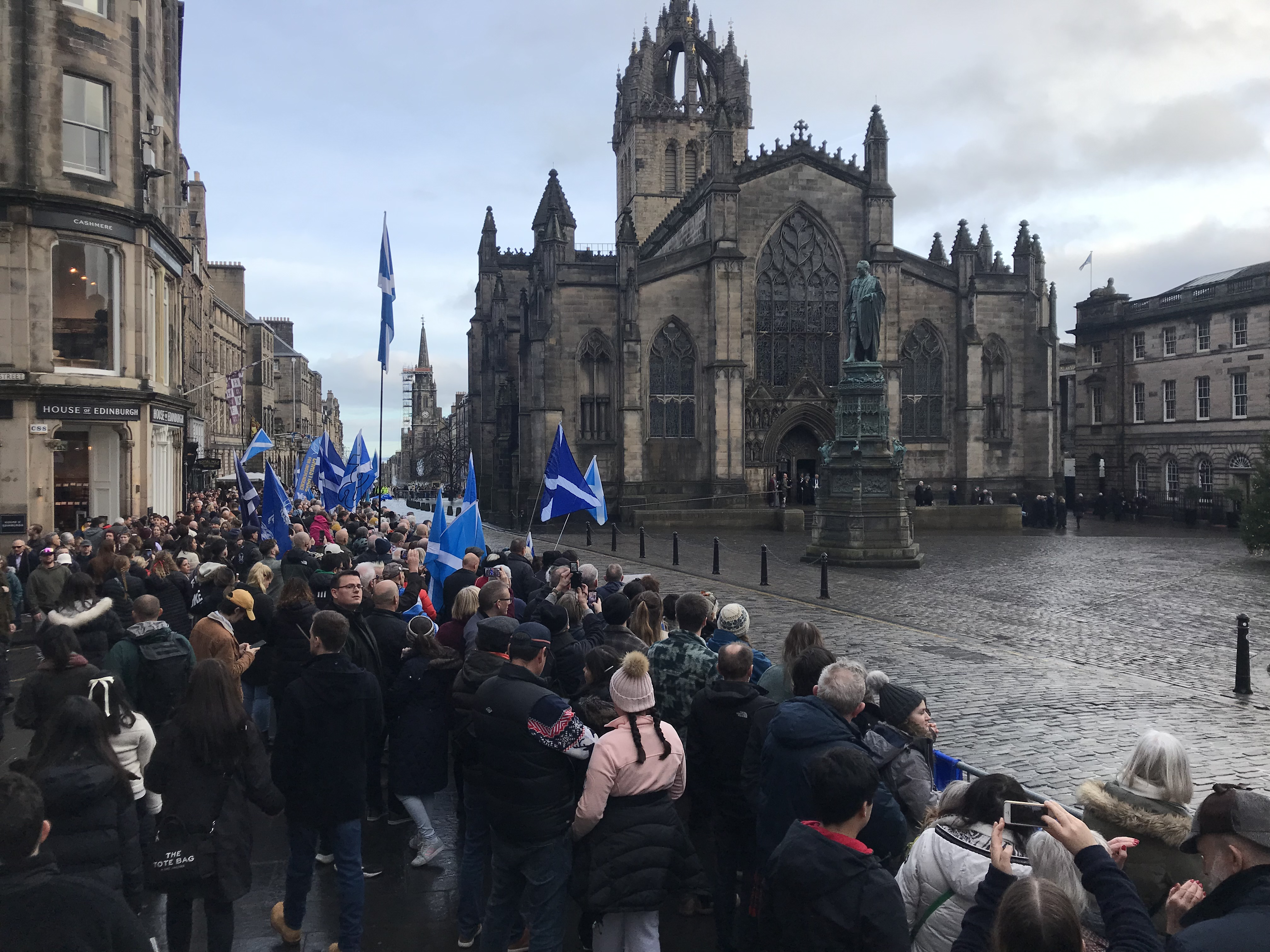
Crowds gathered on the Royal Mile following the memorial service

A private memorial service took place for Salmond on 30 November 2024 at St Giles' Cathedral in Edinburgh. The service was attended by members of Salmond's family and friends, including former prime minister Gordon Brown, first minister John Swinney, Scottish Labour leader Anas Sarwar, Scottish Conservative leader Russell Findlay, acting leader of the Alba Party Kenny MacAskill, former first minister Henry McLeish, friend and MP David Davis and MSP Fergus Ewing.

The service included performances by singer Dougie MacLean, Scottish band The Proclaimers, fiddler Alasdair Fraser with cellist Natalie Haas, and singer Sheena Wellington.

== Honorary degrees and awards ==
Salmond was awarded several honorary degrees in recognition of his political career. These include a doctorate from the University of St Andrews on 30 November 2007 and the degree of Doctor of the University (D.Univ.) from the University of Glasgow on 20 April 2015.

In November 2007 Salmond received The Spectator award for Parliamentarian of the Year, in honour of his "brilliant campaign" and "extraordinary victory" in the Scottish Parliament elections, which ended eight years of Labour rule.

== Notes ==
Party political offices
Preceded by Colin Bell	Vice Chairman of the Scottish National Party for Publicity; 1985–1987	Succeeded by Michael Russell
Preceded by Margaret Ewing	deputy Leader of the Scottish National Party; 1987–1990	Succeeded by Alasdair Morgan
Preceded by Gordon Wilson	National Convener (Leader) of the Scottish National Party; 1990–2000	Succeeded by John Swinney
Preceded by John Swinney	Leader of the Scottish National Party; 2004–2014	Succeeded by Nicola Sturgeon
Parliament of the United Kingdom
Preceded by Albert McQuarrie	Member of Parliament for Banff and Buchan; 1987–2010	Succeeded by Eilidh Whiteford
Preceded by Malcolm Bruce	Member of Parliament for Gordon; 2015–2017	Succeeded by Colin Clark
Scottish Parliament
New constituency	Member of the Scottish Parliament for Banff and Buchan; 1999–2001	Succeeded by Stewart Stevenson
Preceded by Nora Radcliffe	Member of the Scottish Parliament for Gordon; 2007–2011	Constituency abolished
New constituency	Member of the Scottish Parliament for Aberdeenshire East; 2011–2016	Succeeded by Gillian Martin
Political offices
Preceded by Jack McConnell	First Minister of Scotland; 2007–2014	Succeeded by Nicola Sturgeon
