= Lists of female political office-holders in the United Kingdom =

This list shows women who have been elected as members of the House of Commons of the United Kingdom, European Union and other British devolved assemblies, as well as those elected to Mayoral positions.

== United Kingdom ==
=== House of Commons ===
==== List of female Speakers of the House of Commons ====
Party	Name	Constituency	Start	End
Labour	Betty Boothroyd	West Bromwich West	1992	2000

==== List of female Chairs of Ways and Means ====
Party	Name	Constituency	Start	End
Conservative	Dame Eleanor Laing	Epping Forest	2020	2024
Conservative	Nus Ghani	Sussex Weald	2024	present

==== List of female First Deputy Chairs of Ways and Means ====
Party	Name	Constituency	Start	End
Conservative	Betty Harvie Anderson	East Renfrewshire	1970	1973
Labour	Sylvia Heal	Halesowen and Rowley Regis	2000	2010
Conservative	Dame Eleanor Laing	Halesowen and Rowley Regis	2013	2019
Labour	Dame Rosie Winterton	Doncaster Central	2020	2024
Labour	Judith Cummins	Bradford South	2024	present

==== List of female Second Deputy Chairs of Ways and Means ====
Party	Name	Constituency	Start	End
Labour	Betty Boothroyd	West Bromwich West	1987	1992
Conservative	Dame Janet Fookes	Plymouth Drake	1992	1997
Labour	Dame Dawn Primarolo	Bristol South	2010	2015
Labour	Natascha Engel	North East Derbyshire	2015	2017
Labour	Dame Rosie Winterton	Doncaster Central	2017	2019
Conservative	Caroline Nokes	Romsey and Southampton North	2024	present

=== House of Lords ===
==== List of female Lord Speakers ====
Party	Name	Peerage Type	Start	End
Labour	Helene Hayman, Baroness Hayman	Life peer	2006	2011
Crossbench	Frances D'Souza, Baroness D'Souza	Life peer	2011	2016

=== UK Party Leaders ===
Party	Name	Start	End
Conservative	Margaret Thatcher	1975	1990
Green	Jean Lambert	1990	1993
Green	Jean Lambert	1998	1999
Green	Sara Parkin	1990	1992
Green	Jan Clark	1993	1995
Labour	Margaret Beckett (acting)	1994	1994
Green	Peg Alexander	1995	1997
Green	Margaret Wright	1999	2003
Green	Caroline Lucas	2003	2006
Green	Caroline Lucas	2007	2012
Green	Caroline Lucas	2016	2018
Green	Siân Berry	2006	2007
Green	Siân Berry	2018	2021
Labour	Harriet Harman (acting)	2010	2010
Labour	Harriet Harman (acting)	2015	2015
Green	Natalie Bennett	2012	2016
Conservative	Theresa May	2016	2019
UKIP	Diane James (elect)	2016	2016
Brexit Party	Catherine Blaiklock	2019	2019
Liberal Democrats	Jo Swinson	2019	2019
Liberal Democrats	Sal Brinton, Baroness Brinton (acting)	2019	2020
Green	Carla Denyer	2021	2025
Conservative	Liz Truss	2022	2022
Conservative	Kemi Badenoch	2024	present

== European Union ==
=== European Commission ===
==== List of female members of the European Commission from the United Kingdom ====
Party	Name	Portfolio(s)	Start	End
Labour	Catherine Ashton	European Commissioner for Trade	2008	2009
Labour	Catherine Ashton	High Representative for Foreign Affairs and Security Policy	2009	2014
Labour	Catherine Ashton	First Vice President	2010	2014

=== European Party Leaders ===
Party	Name	Start	End
Labour	Barbara Castle	1979	1985
Labour	Pauline Green	1993	1994
Liberal Democrats	Diana Wallis	2001	2004
Liberal Democrats	Diana Wallis	2006	2007
Labour	Glenis Willmott	2009	2017
Liberal Democrats	Fiona Hall	2009	2014
Liberal Democrats	Catherine Bearder	2014	2019
Liberal Democrats	Caroline Voaden	2019	2020

== Scotland ==
=== Scottish Government ===
==== First Ministers of Scotland ====
Party	Name	Portfolio(s)	Start	End
SNP	Nicola Sturgeon	First Minister	2014	2023

==== Scottish Government Cabinet ministers ====
Party	Name	Portfolio(s)	Start	End
Labour	Wendy Alexander	Communities	1999	2000
Labour	Wendy Alexander	Enterprise and Lifelong Learning	2000	2001
Labour	Wendy Alexander	Enterprise, Transport and Lifelong Learning	2001	2002
Labour	Sarah Boyack	Transport and the Environment	1999	2000
Labour	Sarah Boyack	Transport and Planning	2000	2001
Labour	Susan Deacon	Health and Community Care	1999	2001
Labour	Jackie Baillie	Social Justice	2000	2001
Labour	Patricia Ferguson	Minister for Parliament	2001	2004
Labour	Patricia Ferguson	Tourism, Culture and Sport	2004	2007
Labour	Patricia Ferguson	Gaelic	2006	2007
Labour	Cathy Jamieson	Education and Young People	2001	2003
Labour	Cathy Jamieson	Justice	2003	2007
Labour	Margaret Curran	Social Justice	2002	2003
Labour	Margaret Curran	Communities	2003	2004
Labour	Margaret Curran	Minister for Parliament	2004	2007
Independent	Elish Angiolini	Lord Advocate (attending Cabinet)	2006	2011
Labour	Rhona Brankin	Communities	2006	2007
SNP	Nicola Sturgeon	Deputy First Minister	2006	2014
SNP	Nicola Sturgeon	Cabinet Secretary for Health and Wellbeing	2007	2012
SNP	Nicola Sturgeon	Infrastructure, Capital Investment and Cities	2012	2014
SNP	Fiona Hyslop	Education and Lifelong Learning	2007	2009
SNP	Fiona Hyslop	Culture and External Affairs	2011	2014
SNP	Fiona Hyslop	Culture, Europe and External Affairs	2014	2016
SNP	Fiona Hyslop	Culture, Tourism and External Affairs	2016	2020
SNP	Fiona Hyslop	Economy, Fair Work and Culture	2020	2021
SNP	Fiona Hyslop	Transport	2024	2026
SNP	Angela Constance	Training, Youth and Women’s Employment	2014	2014
SNP	Angela Constance	Education and Lifelong Learning	2014	2016
SNP	Angela Constance	Communities, Social Security and Equalities	2016	2018
SNP	Angela Constance	Justice and Home Affairs	2023	2026
SNP	Angela Constance	Health and Care	2026	present
SNP	Roseanna Cunningham	Fair Work, Skills and Training	2014	2016
SNP	Roseanna Cunningham	Environment, Climate Change and Land Reform	2016	2021
SNP	Shona Robison	Commonwealth Games, Sport, Equalities and Pensioners' Rights	2014	2014
SNP	Shona Robison	Health and Sport	2014	2018
SNP	Shona Robison	Social Justice, Housing and Local Government	2021	2023
SNP	Shona Robison	Deputy First Minister	2023	2024
SNP	Shona Robison	Finance	2023	2024
SNP	Shona Robison	Finance and Local Government	2024	2026
Independent	Leslie Evans	Permanent Secretary (attending Cabinet)	2015	2022
SNP	Aileen Campbell	Communities and Local Government	2018	2021
SNP	Jeane Freeman	Health and Sport	2018	2021
SNP	Kate Forbes	Finance	2020	2021
SNP	Kate Forbes	Finance and the Economy	2021	2023 (Note: On leave from 2022–2023.)
SNP	Kate Forbes	Deputy First Minister	2024	2026
SNP	Kate Forbes	Economy and Gaelic	2024	2026
Independent	Dorothy Bain	Lord Advocate (attending Cabinet)	2021	2026
SNP	Mairi Gougeon	Rural Affairs and Islands	2021	2023
SNP	Mairi Gougeon	Rural Affairs, Land Reform and Islands	2023	2026
SNP	Shirley-Anne Somerville	Social Security and Older People	2021	2021
SNP	Shirley-Anne Somerville	Education and Skills	2021	2023
SNP	Shirley-Anne Somerville	Social Justice	2023	2026
SNP	Shirley-Anne Somerville	Social Justice and Housing	2026	present
SNP	Jenny Gilruth	Education and Skills	2023	2026
SNP	Jenny Gilruth	Deputy First Minister	2026	present
SNP	Jenny Gilruth	Finance and Local Government	2026	present
SNP	Màiri McAllan	Transport, Net Zero and Just Transition	2023	2024
SNP	Màiri McAllan	Wellbeing Economy, Net Zero and Energy	2024	2024
SNP	Màiri McAllan	Net Zero and Energy	2024	2025 (Note: On leave from 2024–2025.)
SNP	Màiri McAllan	Housing	2025	2026
SNP	Màiri McAllan	Education, Culture and Gaelic	2026	present
SNP	Gillian Martin	Net Zero and Energy (acting)	2024	2025
SNP	Gillian Martin	Climate Action and Energy	2025	2026
SNP	Gillian Martin	Climate Action and Rural Affairs	2026	present
Independent	Ruth Charteris	Lord Advocate (attending Cabient)	2026	present

==== Scottish Government junior ministers ====
Party	Name	Portfolio(s)	Start	End
Labour	Jackie Baillie	Social Inclusion, Equality and the Voluntary Sector	1999	2000
Labour	Rhona Brankin	Culture and Sport	1999	2000
Labour	Rhona Brankin	Rural Development	2000	2001
Labour	Rhona Brankin	Health and Community Care	2004	2005
Labour	Rhona Brankin	Environment and Rural Development	2005	2007
Labour	Margaret Curran	Social Justice	2000	2002
Independent	Elish Angiolini	Solicitor General	2001	2006
Labour	Elaine Murray	Tourism, Culture and Sport	2001	2003
Labour	Mary Mulligan	Health an Community Care	2001	2003
Labour	Mary Mulligan	Communities	2003	2007
Labour	Sarah Boyack	Environment and Rural Development	2007	2007
SNP	Maureen Watt	Schools and Skills	2007	2009
SNP	Maureen Watt	Public Health	2014	2016
SNP	Maureen Watt	Mental Health	2016	2018
SNP	Linda Fabiani	Europe, External Affairs and Culture	2007	2009
SNP	Linda Fabiani	Gaelic	2007	2009
SNP	Shona Robison	Public Health and Sport	2007	2011
SNP	Shona Robison	Commonwealth Games and Sport	2011	2014
SNP	Roseanna Cunningham	Environment	2009	2010
SNP	Roseanna Cunningham	Environment and Climate Change	2010	2011
SNP	Roseanna Cunningham	Community Safety and Legal Affairs	2011	2014
SNP	Fiona Hyslop	Culture and External Affairs	2009	2011
SNP	Fiona Hyslop	Gaelic	2009	2011
SNP	Fiona Hyslop	Transport	2023	2024
SNP	Angela Constance	Skills and Lifelong Learning	2010	2011
SNP	Angela Constance	Minister for Children and Young People	2011	2011
SNP	Angela Constance	Younth Employment	2011	2014
SNP	Angela Constance	Drugs Policy	2020	2023
SNP	Aileen Campbell	Local Government and Planning	2011	2011
SNP	Aileen Campbell	Minister for Children and Young People	2011	2016
SNP	Aileen Campbell	Public Health and Sport	2016	2018
Independent	Lesley Thomson	Solicitor General	2011	2016
SNP	Margaret Burgess	Housing ad Welfare	2014	2016
SNP	Annabelle Ewing	Youth and Women’s Employment	2014	2016
SNP	Annabelle Ewing	Community Safety and Legal Affairs	2016	2018
SNP	Aileen McLeod	Environment, Climate Change and Land Reform	2014	2016
Independent	Alison Di Rollo	Solicitor General	2016	2021
SNP	Jeane Freeman	Social Security	2016	2018
SNP	Shirley-Anne Somerville	Further Education, Higher Education and Science	2016	2018
SNP	Maree Todd	Childcare and Early Years	2017	2018
SNP	Maree Todd	Children and Young People	2018	2021
SNP	Maree Todd	Public Health, Women's Health and Sport	2021	2023
SNP	Maree Todd	Social Care, Mental Wellbeing and Sport	2023	2025
SNP	Maree Todd	Drugs and Alcohol Policy and Sport	2025	2026
SNP	Maree Todd	Mental Wellbeing, Public Health, Sport, Alcohol and Drugs	2026	present
SNP	Kate Forbes	Minister for Public Finance and Migration	2018	2020
SNP	Mairi Gougeon	Rural Affairs and the Natural Environment	2018	2020
SNP	Mairi Gougeon	Public Health, Sport and Wellbeing	2020	2021
SNP	Clare Haughey	Mental Health	2018	2021
SNP	Clare Haughey	Minister for Children and Young People	2021	2023
SNP	Christina McKelvie	Older People and Equalities	2018	2023
SNP	Christina McKelvie	Culture, Europe and International Development	2023	2024
SNP	Christina McKelvie	Drugs and Alcohol Policy	2024	2025
SNP	Ash Regan	Community Safety	2018	2022
SNP	Jenny Gilruth	Europe and International Development	2020	2022
SNP	Jenny Gilruth	Transport	2022	2023
Independent	Ruth Charteris	Solicitor General	2021	2023
SNP	Màiri McAllan	Environment, Biodiversity and Land Reform	2021	2023
Green	Lorna Slater (Note: Attended Cabinet twice a year as part of the Bute House Agreement.)	Green Skills, Circular Economy and Biodiversity	2021	2024
SNP	Elena Whitham	Community Safety	2022	2023
SNP	Elena Whitham	Drugs and Alcohol Policy	2023	2024
SNP	Siobhian Brown	Victims and Community Safety	2023	2026
SNP	Siobhian Brown	Children, Young People and the Promise	2026	present
SNP	Natalie Don-Innes	Children, Young People and Keeping the Promise	2023	2024
SNP	Natalie Don-Innes	Children, Young People and the Promise	2024	2026
SNP	Jenni Minto	Public Health and Women's Health	2023	2026
SNP	Emma Roddick	Equalities, Migration and Refugees	2023	2024
SNP	Kaukab Stewart	Culture, Europe and International Development	2024	2024
SNP	Kaukab Stewart	Equalities	2024	2026
SNP	Hannah Goodlad	Public Finance	2026	present
SNP	Simita Kumar	Equalities and International Development	2026	present
SNP	Kirsten Oswald	Victims and Community Safety	2026	present
SNP	Alison Thewliss	Community Care	2026	present

=== Scottish Parliament ===
==== List of female Presiding Officers of the Scottish Parliament ====
Party	Name	Constituency	Start	End
SNP	Tricia Marwick	Mid Fife and Glenrothes	2011	2016
Green	Alison Johnstone	Lothian	2021	2026

==== List of female Deputy Presiding Officers of the Scottish Parliament ====
Party	Name	Constituency	Start	End
Labour	Patricia Ferguson	Glasgow Maryhill	1999	2001
Labour	Trish Godman	West Renfrewshire	2003	2011
Labour	Elaine Smith	Coatbridge and Chryston	2011	2016
SNP	Linda Fabiani	East Kilbride	2016	2021
SNP	Christine Grahame	Midlothian South, Tweeddale and Lauderdale	2016	2021
SNP	Annabelle Ewing	Cowdenbeath	2021	2026
SNP	Clare Adamson	Motherwell and Wishaw	2026	present
Labour	Katy Clark	West Scotland	2026	present

=== Scottish Party Leaders ===
Party	Name	Start	End
Labour	Cathy Jamieson (acting)	2001	2001
Labour	Cathy Jamieson (acting)	2007	2007
Labour	Cathy Jamieson (acting)	2008	2008
Conservative	Annabel Goldie	2005	2011
Labour	Wendy Alexander	2007	2008
Conservative	Ruth Davidson	2011	2019
Labour	Johann Lamont	2011	2014
SNP	Nicola Sturgeon	2014	2023
Labour	Kezia Dugdale	2015	2017
Labour	Jackie Baillie (acting)	2017	2017
Labour	Jackie Baillie (acting)	2026	2026
Green	Lorna Slater	2019	2025
Reform	Michelle Ballantyne	2021	2022
Green	Gillian Mackay	2025	present

== Wales ==
=== Welsh Government ===
==== First Ministers of Wales ====
Party	Name	Portfolio(s)	Start	End
Labour	Eluned Morgan	First Minister	2024	2026

==== Welsh Government Cabinet ministers ====
Party	Name	Portfolio(s)	Start	End
Labour	Rosemary Butler	Education	1999	2000
Labour	Christine Gwyther	Agriculture and the Rural Economy	1999	2000
Labour	Christine Gwyther	Agriculture and Rural Development	2000	2000
Labour	Edwina Hart	Finance	1999	2000
Labour	Edwina Hart	Finance and Local Government	2000	2003
Labour	Edwina Hart	Social Justice and Regeneration	2003	2007
Labour	Edwina Hart	Health and Social Services	2007	2011
Labour	Edwina Hart	Business, Enterprise, Technology and Science	2011	2016
Labour	Edwina Hart	Agriculture, Fisheries and Food	2014	2014
Labour	Jane Hutt	Health and Social Services	1999	2000
Labour	Jane Hutt	Health and Social Care	2000	2005
Labour	Jane Hutt	Assembly Business	2005	2007
Labour	Jane Hutt	Equalities and Children	2005	2007
Labour	Jane Hutt	Children, Education, Lifelong Learning and Skills	2007	2009
Labour	Jane Hutt	Budget	2007	2007
Labour	Jane Hutt	Assembly Business and Budget	2009	2011
Labour	Jane Hutt	Finance	2011	2014
Labour	Jane Hutt	Government Business	2014	2016
Labour	Jane Hutt	Leader of the House	2016	2017
Labour	Jane Hutt	Chief Whip	2016	2017
Labour	Jane Hutt	Social Justice	2021	2024
Labour	Jane Hutt	Chief Whip	2023	2026
Labour	Jane Hutt	Trefnydd	2024	2026
Labour	Jane Hutt	Social Justice and Culture	2024	2024
Labour	Jane Hutt	Social Justice	2024	2026
Labour	Jane Davidson	Education	2000	2005
Labour	Jane Davidson	Education, Lifelong Learning and Skills	2005	2007
Labour	Jane Davidson	Sustainability and Rural Development	2007	2007
Labour	Jane Davidson	Environment, Sustainability and Housing	2007	2011
Labour	Sue Essex	Environment, Planning and Transport	2000	2003
Labour	Sue Essex	Finance and Local Government	2003	2005
Labour	Sue Essex	Finance, Local Government and Public Services	2005	2007
Liberal Democrats	Jenny Randerson	Culture	2000	2003
Liberal Democrats	Jenny Randerson	Deputy First Minister (acting)	2001	2002
Labour	Karen Sinclair	Chief Whip (Note: Attending Cabinet from 2000–2003 and 2005–2007.)	2000	2007
Labour	Karen Sinclair	Assembly Business	2003	2005
Plaid Cymru	Elin Jones	Rural Affairs	2007	2011
Plaid Cymru	Elin Jones	Finance	2026	present
Labour	Janice Gregory	Chief Whip (attending Cabinet)	2009	2016
Labour	Lesley Griffiths	Health and Social Services	2011	2013
Labour	Lesley Griffiths	Local Government and Government Business	2013	2014
Labour	Lesley Griffiths	Communities and Tackling Poverty	2014	2016
Labour	Lesley Griffiths	Environment and Rural Affairs	2016	2017
Labour	Lesley Griffiths	Environment, Planning and Rural Affairs	2017	2021
Labour	Lesley Griffiths	Rural Affairs and North Wales	2021	2024
Labour	Lesley Griffiths	Trefnydd	2021	2024
Labour	Lesley Griffiths	Culture and Social Justice	2024	2024
Liberal Democrats	Kirsty Williams	Education and Skills	2016	2018
Liberal Democrats	Kirsty Williams	Education	2018	2021
Labour	Rebecca Evans	Housing and Regeneration	2017	2018
Labour	Rebecca Evans	Finance	2018	2021
Labour	Rebecca Evans	Trefnydd	2018	2021
Labour	Rebecca Evans	Finance and Local Government	2021	2024
Labour	Rebecca Evans	Finance, Constitution and the Cabinet Office	2024	2024
Labour	Rebecca Evans	Economy, Energy and Planning	2024	2026
Labour	Julie James	Leader of the House	2017	2018
Labour	Julie James	Chief Whip	2017	2018
Labour	Julie James	Housing and Local Government	2018	2021
Labour	Julie James	Climate Change	2021	2024
Labour	Julie James	Housing, Local Government and Planning	2024	2024
Labour	Eluned Morgan	International Relations	2018	2020
Labour	Eluned Morgan	Welsh Language	2018	2024
Labour	Eluned Morgan	Minister for Mental Health and Wellbeing	2020	2021
Labour	Eluned Morgan	Health and Social Services	2021	2024
Labour	Eluned Morgan	Health and Social Care	2024	2024
Labour	Lynne Neagle	Education	2024	2026
Labour	Jayne Bryant	Housing, Local Government and Planning	2024	2024
Labour	Jayne Bryant	Housing and Local Government	2024	2026
Plaid Cymru	Anna Brychan	Education and the Welsh Language	2026	present
Plaid Cymru	Heledd Fychan	Trefnydd	2026	present
Plaid Cymru	Heledd Fychan	Chief Whip	2026	present
Plaid Cymru	Heledd Fychan	Culture and Sport	2026	present
Plaid Cymru	Siân Gwenllian	Local Government, Housing and Planning	2026	present
Plaid Cymru	Sioned Williams	Deputy First Minister	2026	present
Plaid Cymru	Sioned Williams	Social Justice and Equality	2026	present

==== Welsh Government junior ministers ====
Party	Name	Portfolio(s)	Start	End
Labour	Christine Chapman	Education and the Economy	2000	2000
Labour	Christine Chapman	Education, Lifelong Learning and Skills	2005	2007
Labour	Christine Chapman	Finance, Local Government and Public Services	2005	2007
Labour	Delyth Evans	Agriculture, Local Government and Environment	2000	2000
Labour	Delyth Evans	Rural Affairs, Culture and the Environment	2000	2003
Labour	Tamsin Dunwoody	Enterprise, Innovation and Networks	2005	2007
Labour	Tamsin Dunwoody	Environment, Planning and Countryside	2005	2007
Plaid Cymru	Jocelyn Davies	Housing	2007	2009
Plaid Cymru	Jocelyn Davies	Housing and Regeneration	2009	2011
Labour	Gwenda Thomas	Health and Social Services	2007	2007
Labour	Gwenda Thomas	Social Services	2007	2011
Labour	Gwenda Thomas	Children and Social Services	2011	2014
Labour	Lesley Griffiths	Science, Innovation and Skills	2009	2011
Labour	Rebecca Evans	Agriculture and Fisheries	2014	2014
Labour	Rebecca Evans	Farming and Food	2014	2016
Labour	Rebecca Evans	Social Services and Public Health	2016	2017
Labour	Julie James	Skills and Technology	2014	2016
Labour	Julie James	Skills and Science	2016	2017
Labour	Julie James	Counsel General	2024	2026
Labour	Julie James	Delivery	2024	2026
Labour	Eluned Morgan	Lifelong Learning and Welsh Language	2017	2018
Labour	Hannah Blythyn	Environment	2017	2018
Labour	Hannah Blythyn	Housing and Local Government	2018	2021
Labour	Hannah Blythyn	Social Partnership	2021	2024
Labour	Jane Hutt	Chief Whip	2018	2021
Labour	Julie Morgan	Social Services	2018	2024
Labour	Dawn Bowden	Chief Whip	2021	2023
Labour	Dawn Bowden	Arts and Sport	2021	2023
Labour	Dawn Bowden	Arts, Sport and Tourism	2023	2024
Labour	Dawn Bowden	Social Care	2024	2024
Labour	Dawn Bowden	Children and Social Care	2024	2026
Labour	Lynne Neagle	Mental Health and Wellbeing	2021	2024
Labour	Jayne Bryant	Mental Health and Early Years	2024	2024
Labour	Vikki Howells	Further and Higher Education	2024	2026
Independent	Elisabeth Jones	Counsel General	2024	2024
Labour	Sarah Murphy	Social Partnership	2024	2024
Labour	Sarah Murphy	Mental Health and Early Years	2024	2024
Labour	Sarah Murphy	Mental Health and Wellbeing	2024	2026
Plaid Cymru	Nerys Evans	Public and Preventative Health	2026	present
Plaid Cymru	Delyth Jewell	Social Care, Mental Health and Women's Health	2026	present

=== Senedd ===
==== List of female Llywyddion (Presiding Officers) ====
Party	Name	Constituency	Start	End
Labour	Rosemary Butler	Newport West	2011	2016
Plaid Cymru	Elin Jones	Ceredigion	2016	2026

==== List of female Dirprwy Lywyddion (Deputy Presiding Officers) ====
Party	Name	Constituency	Start	End
Labour	Jane Davidson	Pontypridd	1999	2000
Labour	Rosemary Butler	Newport West	2007	2011
Labour	Ann Jones	Vale of Clwyd	2016	2021
Plaid Cymru	Kerry Ferguson	Ceredigion Penfro	2026	present

=== Welsh Party Leaders ===
Party	Name	Start	End
Green	Ann Were	2006	2007
Green	Leila Kiersch	2007	2009
Liberal Democrats	Kirsty Williams	2008	2016
Liberal Democrats	Kirsty Williams	2017 (Note: Acting)	2017
Green	Pippa Bartolotti	2011	2015
Plaid Cymru	Leanne Wood	2012	2018
Green	Alice Hooker-Stroud	2015	2017
Liberal Democrats	Jane Dodds	2017	2026
Labour	Eluned Morgan	2024	2026
Reform	Helen Jenner	2026	present

== Northern Ireland ==
=== Northern Ireland Executive ===
==== First Ministers and Deputy First Ministers of Northern Ireland ====
Party	Name	Portfolio(s)	Start	End
DUP	Arlene Foster	First Minister (acting)	2010	2010
DUP	Arlene Foster	First Minister (acting)	2015	2015
DUP	Arlene Foster	First Minister	2016	2017
DUP	Arlene Foster	First Minister	2020	2021
Sinn Féin	Michelle O'Neill	Deputy First Minister	2020	2022
Sinn Féin	Michelle O'Neill	First Minister	2024	present
DUP	Emma Little-Pengelly	Deputy First Minister	2024	present

==== Northern Ireland Executive Cabinet ministers ====
Party	Name	Portfolio(s)	Start	End
Sinn Féin	Bairbre de Brún	Health, Social Services and Public Safety	1999	2002
SDLP	Carmel Hanna	Employment and Learning	2001	2002
DUP	Arlene Foster	Environment	2007	2008
DUP	Arlene Foster	Enterprise, Trade and Investment	2008	2011
DUP	Arlene Foster	Enterprise and Investment	2011	2015
DUP	Arlene Foster	Finance and Personnel	2015	2016
Sinn Féin	Michelle Gildernew	Agriculture and Rural Development	2007	2011
SDLP	Margaret Ritchie	Social Development	2007	2010
Sinn Féin	Caitríona Ruane	Education	2007	2011
Sinn Féin	Carál Ní Chuilín	Culture, Arts and Leisure	2011	2016
Sinn Féin	Carál Ní Chuilín	Communities	2020	2020
Sinn Féin	Michelle O'Neill	Agriculture and Rural Development	2011	2016
Sinn Féin	Michelle O'Neill	Health	2016	2017
DUP	Michelle McIlveen	Regional Development	2015	2016
DUP	Michelle McIlveen	Agriculture, Environment and Rural Affairs	2016	2017
DUP	Michelle McIlveen	Education	2021	2022
Ind. Unionist	Claire Sugden	Justice	2016	2017
DUP	Diane Dodds	Economy	2020	2021
Sinn Féin	Deirdre Hargey	Communities	2020	2020
Sinn Féin	Deirdre Hargey	Communities	2020	2022
Sinn Féin	Deirdre Hargey	Economy (acting)	2024	2024
Alliance	Naomi Long	Justice	2020	2022
Alliance	Naomi Long	Justice	2024	present
SDLP	Nichola Mallon	Infrastructure	2020	2022
Sinn Féin	Caoimhe Archibald	Finance	2024	2025
Sinn Féin	Caoimhe Archibald	Economy	2025	present
Sinn Féin	Liz Kimmins	Infrastructure	2025	present

==== Northern Ireland Executive junior ministers ====
Party	Name	Portfolio(s)	Start	End
Sinn Féin	Martina Anderson	Assisting the Deputy First Minister	2011	2012
Sinn Féin	Jennifer McCann	Assisting the Deputy First Minister	2012	2016
DUP	Michelle McIlveen	Assisting the First Minister	2015	2015
DUP	Emma Little-Pengelly	Assisting the First Minister	2015	2016
Sinn Féin	Megan Fearon	Assisting the Deputy First Minister	2016	2017
DUP	Pam Cameron	Assisting the Deputy First Minister	2024	2025
Sinn Féin	Aisling Reilly	Assisting the First Minister	2024	present
DUP	Joanne Bunting	Assisting the Deputy First Minister	2025	present

=== Northern Ireland Assembly ===
==== List of female Speakers ====
Party	Name	Constituency	Start	End
Alliance	Eileen Bell (Note: Acting)	North Down	2006	2007

==== List of female Deputy Speakers ====
Party	Name	Constituency	Office	Start	End
NI Women's Coalition	Jane Morrice	North Down	Deputy Speaker	2000	2007
Sinn Féin	Caitríona Ruane	South Down	Principal Deputy Speaker	2016	2017
Sinn Féin	Carál Ní Chuilín	Belfast North	Principal Deputy Speaker	2024	present

=== Northern Irish Party Leaders ===
Party	Name	Start	End
SDLP	Margaret Ritchie	2010	2011
DUP	Arlene Foster	2015	2021
Conservative	Emma Pidding	2015	2020
Alliance	Naomi Long	2016	present
Sinn Féin	Michelle O'Neill	2017	present
Green	Clare Bailey	2018	2022
SDLP	Claire Hanna	2024	present

== Greater London Authority ==
=== London Assembly ===
==== List of female chairs of the London Assembly ====
Party	Name	Constituency	Start	End
Liberal Democrats	Sally Hamwee	Additional member	2001	2002
Liberal Democrats	Sally Hamwee	Additional member	2003	2004
Liberal Democrats	Sally Hamwee	Additional member	2005	2006
Liberal Democrats	Sally Hamwee	Additional member	2007	2008
Labour	Jennette Arnold	North East	2008	2009
Labour	Jennette Arnold	North East	2011	2013
Labour	Jennette Arnold	North East	2015	2016
Labour	Jennette Arnold	North East	2017	2018
Labour	Jennette Arnold	North East	2019	2020
Liberal Democrats	Dee Doocey	Additional member	2010	2011

=== Deputy Mayors of London ===
==== List of female Deputy Mayors of London ====
Party	Name	Portfolio(s)	Start	End
Labour	Nicky Gavron	Statutory Deputy	2000	2003
Labour	Nicky Gavron	Statutory Deputy	2004	2008
Green	Jenny Jones	Statutory Deputy; Communities and Social Justice	2003	2004
Conservative	Isabel Dedring	Transport	2008	2016
Conservative	Victoria Borwick	Statutory Deputy	2012	2015
Independent	Munira Mirza	Education and Culture	2012	2016
Labour	Sophie Linden	Policing and Crime	2016	2024
Independent	Shirley Rodrigues	Environment and Energy	2016	2024
Labour	Val Shawcross	Transport	2016	2018
Labour	Heidi Alexander	Transport	2018	2022
Labour	Fiona Twycross	Fire and Resilience	2018	2024
Labour	Debbie Weekes-Bernard	Communities and Social Justice	2018	present
Labour	Joanne McCartney	Statutory Deputy; Education and Childcare	2021	present
Independent	Justine Simons	Culture and Creative Industries	2021	present
Labour	Kaya Comer-Schwartz	Policing and Crime	2024	present

== Combined authorities and combined county authorities ==
=== Directly elected combined authority mayors ===
Party	Name	Constituency	Start	End	Reason
Labour	Norma Redfearn	North of Tyne (acting)	2018	2019	Retired
Labour Co-op	Tracy Brabin	West Yorkshire	2021	present	Serving
Labour Co-op	Kim McGuinness	North East	2024	present	Serving
Labour	Claire Ward	East Midlands	2024	present	Serving
Labour	Helen Godwin	West of England	2025	present	Serving
Reform	Andrea Jenkyns	Greater Lincolnshire	2025	present	Serving
Labour Co-op	Bev Craig	Greater Manchester	2026	present	Serving

== Local authorities ==
=== Directly elected local authority mayors ===
Party	Name	Constituency	Start	End	Reason
Liberal Democrats	Dorothy Thornhill	Watford	2002	2018	Retired
Conservative	Linda Arkley	North Tyneside	2003	2005	Defeated
Conservative	Linda Arkley	North Tyneside	2009	2013	Defeated
Labour	Ros Jones	Doncaster	2013	present	Serving
Labour	Norma Redfearn	North Tyneside	2013	2025	Retired
Mansfield Independents	Kate Allsop	Mansfield	2015	2019	Defeated
Labour	Rokhsana Fiaz	Newham	2018	2026	Retired
Labour	Joanne Anderson	Liverpool	2021	2023	Position abolished
Labour	Caroline Woodley	Hackney	2023	2026	Defeated
Labour	Brenda Dacres	Lewisham	2024	2026	Defeated
Labour	Karen Clark	North Tyneside	2025	present	Serving
Green	Zoë Garbett	Hackney	2026	present	Serving

== See also ==
- Timeline of female MPs in the House of Commons
- All-women shortlists
- Election results of women in United Kingdom general elections (1918–1945)
- Parliament (Qualification of Women) Act 1918
- Records of members of parliament of the United Kingdom § Women
- Women in the House of Commons of the United Kingdom
- Women in the House of Lords
- Widow's succession
