= Minister for Gaelic =

Scottish government minister post

Minister for Gaelic is a junior minister post in the Scottish Government. Gaelic now lies in the responsibility of the Scottish Government, having been in control of the Scottish Office prior to 1999.

Ministers of Gaelic also have had another portfolio, whilst being Minister of Gaelic.

The post was discontinued under the second Sturgeon government, having come under the remit of the Education Secretary. This has been a cause of controversy amongst Gaelic speaking groups and communities.

The post then made a return under the Swinney government with Deputy First Minister of Scotland Kate Forbes assuming responsibility for Gaelic in her secondary role as Cabinet Secretary for Economy and Gaelic.

== Ministers ==
=== Minister for Gaelic ===
	Name	Entered office	Left office	Party	Shared Portfolio
1.	Brian Wilson	May 1997	July 1998	Labour Party	Minister of State for Education and Industry (Scottish Office)
2.	Calum MacDonald	July, 1998	July 1999	Labour Party	Minister for Housing, Planning and European Affairs (Scottish Office)
3.	Alasdair Morrison	July, 1999	November 2001	Labour Party	Deputy Minister for Enterprise & Lifelong Learning
4.	Mike Watson	November 2001	20 May 2003	Labour Party	Minister for Tourism, Culture and Sport
5.	Peter Peacock	20 May 2003	November, 2006	Labour Party	Minister for Education and Young People
6.	Patricia Ferguson	November, 2006	3 May 2007	Labour Party	Minister for Tourism, Culture and Sport
7.	Linda Fabiani	3 May 2007	10 February 2009	Scottish National Party	Minister for Europe, External Affairs and Culture
8.	Michael Russell	10 February 2009	1 December 2009	Scottish National Party	Minister for Europe, External Affairs and Culture
9.	Fiona Hyslop	1 December 2009	7 December 2011	Scottish National Party	Minister for Europe, External Affairs and Culture
10.	Alasdair Allan	7 December 2011	18 May 2016	Scottish National Party	Minister for Learning, Science and Scotland's Languages
11.	Kate Forbes	8 May 2024	Incumbent	Scottish National Party	Cabinet Secretary for Economy and Gaelic
