= Andy Kerr (Scottish politician) =

Scottish politician (born 1962)

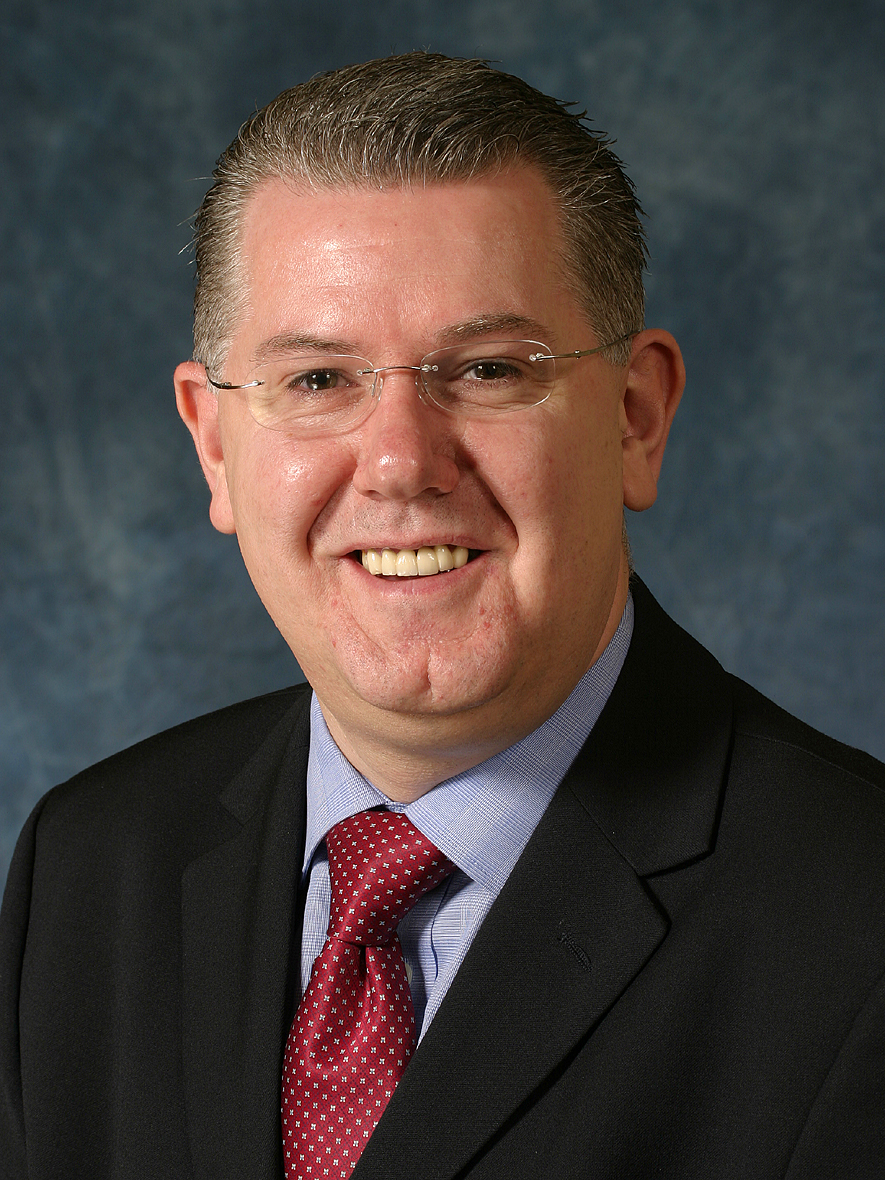
- Official portrait, 2003

Minister for Health and Community Care
- In office 4 October 2004 – 17 May 2007
- First Minister: Jack McConnell
- Preceded by: Malcolm Chisholm
- Succeeded by: Nicola Sturgeon

Minister for Finance and Public Services
- In office 28 November 2001 – 4 October 2004
- First Minister: Jack McConnell
- Preceded by: Angus MacKay
- Succeeded by: Tom McCabe

Member of the Scottish Parliament for East Kilbride
- In office 6 May 1999 – 22 March 2011
- Preceded by: Constituency established
- Succeeded by: Linda Fabiani

Personal details
- Born: 17 March 1962 (age 64) East Kilbride, Scotland
- Party: Scottish Labour
- Education: Glasgow Caledonian University

Andy Kerr (born 17 March 1962) is a Scottish politician who served as Minister for Finance and Public Services from 2001 to 2004 and Minister for Health and Community Care from 2004 to 2007. A member of the Scottish Labour Party, he was Member of the Scottish Parliament (MSP) for the East Kilbride constituency from 1999 to 2011.

== Early years ==
Born in East Kilbride, Kerr was educated at Claremont High School in East Kilbride and obtained a BA in Social Sciences at Glasgow Caledonian University. Prior to being elected to the Scottish Parliament, he was a senior officer in Glasgow City Council land services department and served as an adviser in the Leader's office. He was also founder and managing director of Achieving, a quality assurance consultancy.

== Parliamentary career ==
He was convener of the Scottish Parliament's Transport and Environment Committee and served on the Confederation of British Industry working group designed to bring Members of the Scottish Parliament (MSP) and business closer together as well as being on the cross-party group on ageing and the elderly.

Kerr is considered to be an ally of Motherwell and Wishaw MSP Jack McConnell, working with him on his two successive bids for the leadership of Scottish Labour and the position of First Minister.

Kerr was first appointed Minister for Finance and Public Services in the Scottish Executive in November 2001 and moved to become Minister for Health and Community Care in October 2004, replacing Malcolm Chisolm. As Health Minister, Kerr oversaw significant NHS restructuring.

He was also responsible for the Scottish ban on smoking ban in public places which was introduced on 26 March 2006. In November 2006, he won the Scottish Politician of the Year award in recognition of his work to bring in the smoking ban. Kerr retained the health portfolio in McConnell's shadow cabinet upon the Scottish National Party's victory at the 2007 election.

Having ruled himself out of contention as a successor for Jack McConnell, Kerr voted for Wendy Alexander to become leader of the Scottish Labour Party. On 17 September 2007 he was appointed Shadow Cabinet Secretary for Public Services and Local Government. With Wendy Alexander's resignation as leader of the Labour Party in Scotland, Kerr stood for election as the next leader. However, following the victory of Iain Gray in the leadership election, Kerr was appointed Shadow Cabinet Secretary for Finance and Sustainable Growth.

At the 2011 Scottish Parliament election, Kerr was one of many Labour casualties, losing his seat after 12 years to Linda Fabiani of the SNP. Kerr did not stand on the regional list, so therefore did not return as an MSP.

== After Politics ==
On 11 July 2011, it was announced that Andy had been appointed to the vacant CEO position at Scottish Charity Organisation, Sense Scotland.

In April 2019, Andy Kerr was appointed Chief Operating Officer at the newly formed Piper Group of charities, partnering Sense Scotland with Enable Scotland. Five Months later, Sense Scotland would quit the partnership, however, Andy Kerr remained in post at The Piper Group.

In November 2019, he was appointed to the Board of the Scottish Funding Council, and in 2020, Andy Kerr was appointed Chair of the Scottish Government's Fair Work in Social Care Group.

== Personal life ==
Kerr lives in Strathaven with his wife and he has 3 daughters.

Scottish Parliament
New constituency	Member of the Scottish Parliament for East Kilbride; 1999-2011	Succeeded by Linda Fabiani
Political offices
Preceded by Malcolm Chisholm	Minister for Health and Community Care; 2004–2007	Succeeded by Nicola Sturgeon as Cabinet Secretary for Health and Wellbeing
Preceded by Angus MacKay as Minister for Finance and Local Government	Minister for Finance and Public Services; 2001–2004	Succeeded by Tom McCabe as Minister for Finance and Public Service Reform
