= Jess Smith (writer) =

Scottish writer and storyteller (born 1948)

Jess Smith BEM
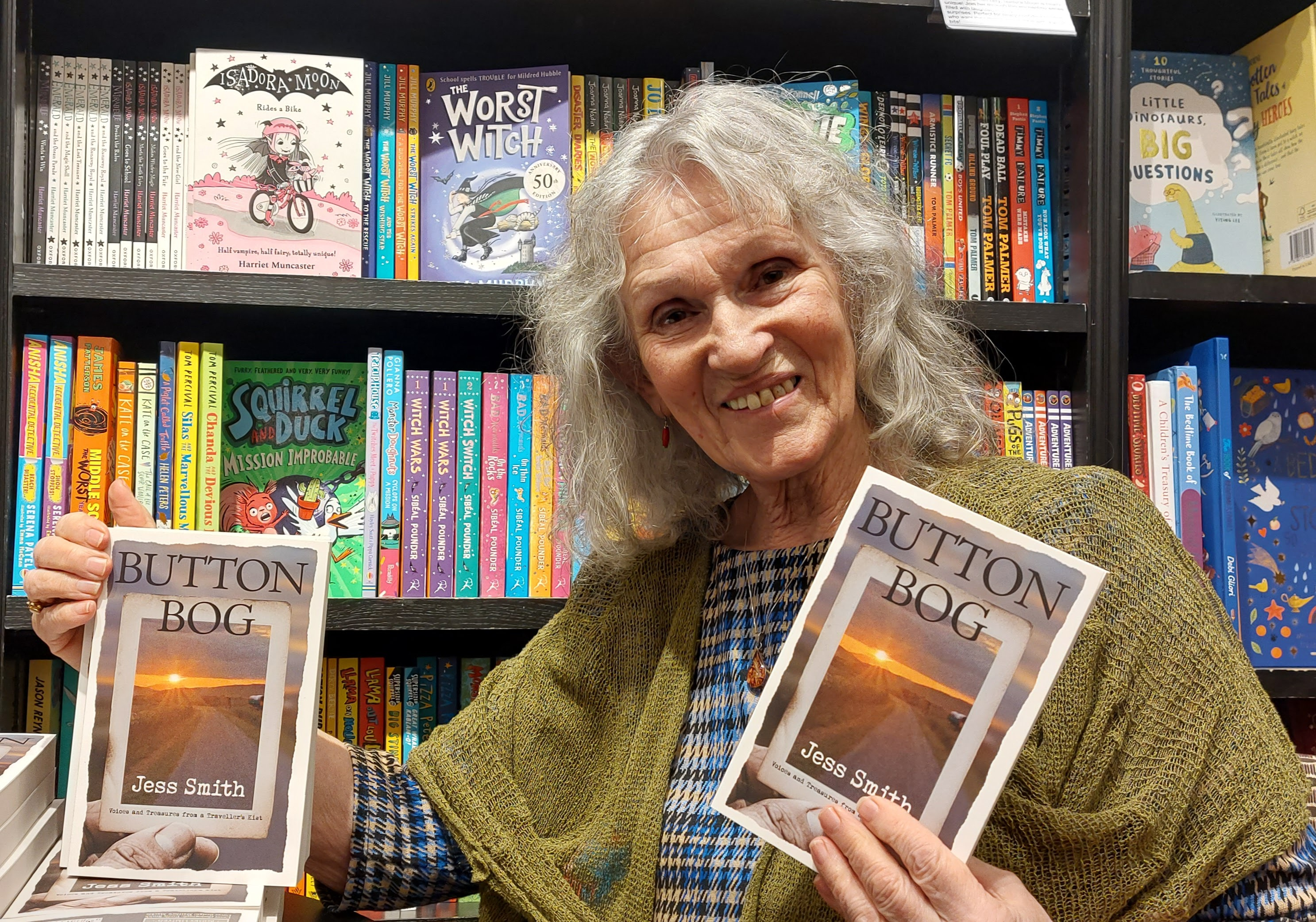
- Smith at a book event in Perth, March 2025
- Born: 1948 (age 77–78)
- Occupation: Author, poet and storyteller
- Period: 2002-
- Notable works: Jessie's Journey; Tales from the Tent; Tears for a Tinker; Bruar's Rest; Sookin' Berries; Way of the Wanderers; Button Bog
- Notable awards: British Empire Medal

Website
- www.jesssmith.co.uk

Jess Smith BEM (born 1948) is a Scottish writer and storyteller. Her work focuses on the experiences of Scottish Travellers. She has written seven books, including an autobiographical trilogy recalling her own childhood experiences, and a booklet on Traveller Dialects (with co-author Robert Dawson). In 2014 she led a campaign to save the Tinkers' Heart, a Scottish Travellers' monument in Argyll, Scotland.

A well known storyteller and public speaker, Smith has raised awareness of Scottish Travellers at schools in Perth & Kinross, Lanarkshire, Edinburgh and Lothians, Leeds, the Highlands and Islands, Suffolk and London, and at libraries, prisons, universities, clubs and Church groups. She has spoken at Story Telling Festivals in Scotland, England, Australia and Ireland, and at Book Festivals throughout the UK in addition to leading writing, story telling and traditional singing workshops. She has been awarded the British Empire Medal (BEM) for services to the Traveller community.

== Early life ==
Smith was born in Aberfeldy in 1948. From a Scottish Traveller family, she lived with her seven sisters and parents in a single decker blue Bedford bus from the ages of five to 15.

== Career ==
Smith started writing seriously after the death of her father, Charles Riley. He had written unpublished memoirs and she had made a promise on his deathbed that she would tell the story of their culture.

Her first poem, Scotia's Bairn, was inspired by a memory of sitting in a bus in Kirkcaldy when another girl refused to take a seat next to her because she was a Traveller.

She provided the inspiration for 'The Language of the Scottish Traveller: A Dictionary' when she sent the author, Pauline Cairns Speitel, a copy of 'The Scottish Traveller Dialects', which she co wrote with Robert Dawson. The hope was that the Dictionary would help break down some of the barriers which divide Travellers from the wider community.

She has written seven books including an autobiographical trilogy recalling her own childhood experiences. Smith's most recent book, Button Bog (2025), includes some of the stories written by her father Charlie Riley, which had been thought lost but were rediscovered in the archives of Scottish folk collector Hamish Henderson.

== Tinkers' Heart campaign ==
In 2012 scheduled monument status was proposed for the Tinkers' Heart of Argyll, the "Gypsy Wedding Place" where Scottish Travellers would go to get married and have their babies blessed. However the application was declined as Historic Scotland indicated that it did not meet the criteria for a monument of national importance. In 2014 Smith launched a campaign to have this decision overturned, and in June 2015 the Heart became a scheduled monument.

== Personal life ==
Smith lives in Perthshire and is married with three adult children; two sons and a daughter. She is patron of the young travellers' rights organisation Article 12.

== Awards and recognition ==
In 2012, Article 12 won the Herald Society Equalities Project of the Year Award.

Smith was shortlisted for a Scottish Heritage Angel Award in 2016 for her involvement in saving the Tinkers' Heart heritage site.

Smith was awarded the British Empire Medal for services to the Traveller community in 2023, in King Charles' first New Years Honours list.

== Bibliography ==
- The Scottish Traveller Dialects (with Robert Dawson) 2002
- Jessie's Journey 2002
- Tales from the Tent 2003
- Tears for a Tinker 2005
- Bruar's Rest 2006
- Sookin' Berries 2008
- Way of the Wanderers 2012
- Button Bog, 2025
