= Angela Constance =

Scottish politician (born 1970)

Angela Constance MSP
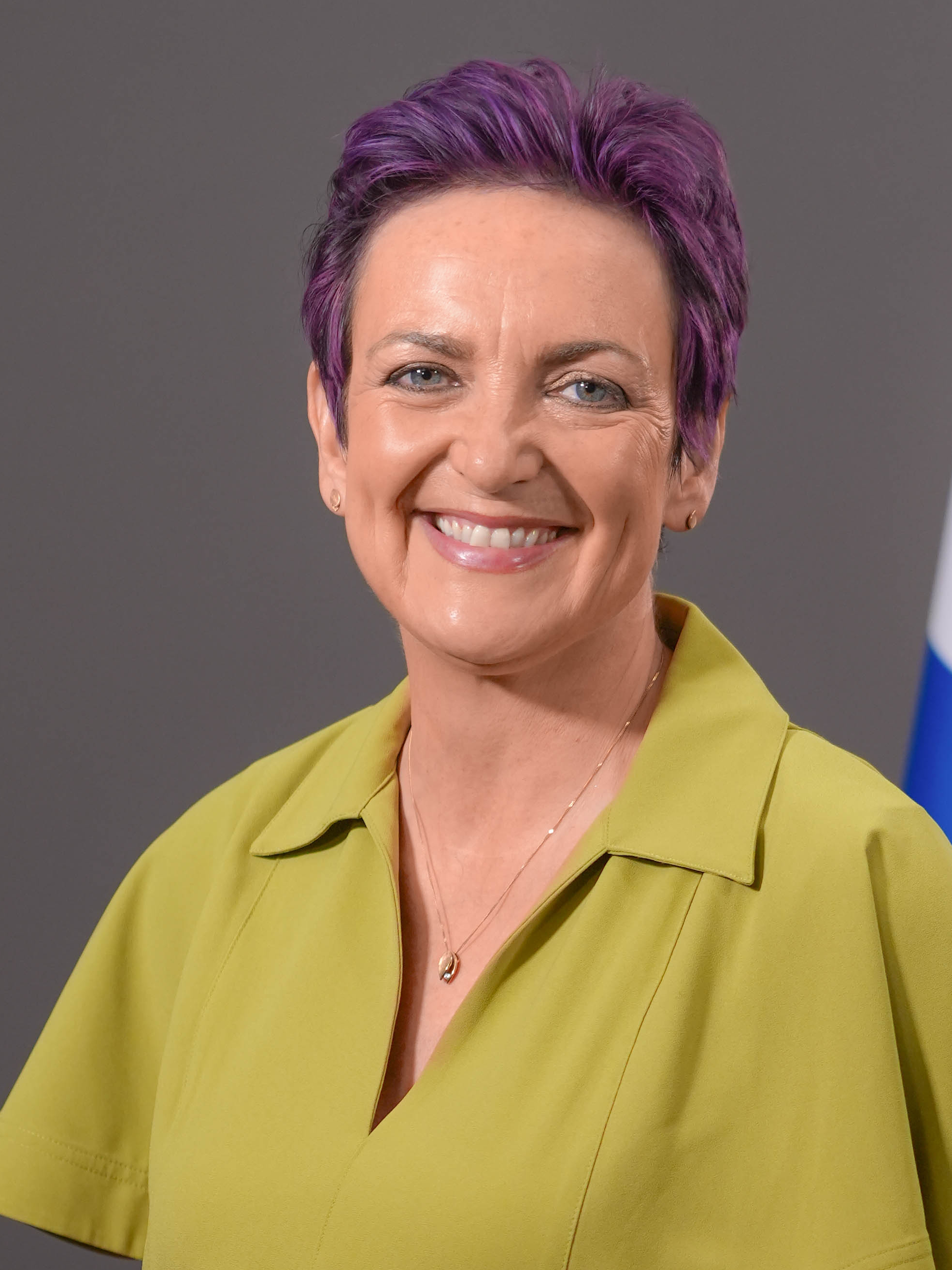
- Official portrait, 2026

Cabinet Secretary for Health and Care
- Incumbent
- Assumed office 20 May 2026
- First Minister: John Swinney
- Preceded by: Neil Gray

Cabinet Secretary for Justice and Home Affairs
- In office 29 March 2023 – 20 May 2026
- First Minister: Humza Yousaf; John Swinney
- Preceded by: Keith Brown
- Succeeded by: Neil Gray

Chairman & Business Convener of the Scottish National Party
- Incumbent
- Assumed office 18 November 2023
- Leader: Humza Yousaf; John Swinney
- Preceded by: Kirsten Oswald
Cabinet and ministerial offices (2014–2023)
Minister for Drugs Policy
In office 18 December 2020 – 29 March 2023
First Minister	Nicola Sturgeon
Preceded by	Office established
Succeeded by	Elena Whitham
Cabinet Secretary for Communities, Social Security and Equalities
In office 18 May 2016 – 26 June 2018
First Minister	Nicola Sturgeon
Preceded by	Alex Neil
Succeeded by	Aileen Campbell
Cabinet Secretary for Education and Lifelong Learning
In office 21 November 2014 – 18 May 2016
First Minister	Nicola Sturgeon
Preceded by	Michael Russell
Succeeded by	John Swinney
Cabinet Secretary for Training, Youth and Women’s Employment
In office 22 April 2014 – 21 November 2014
First Minister	Alex Salmond
Preceded by	Office established
Succeeded by	Roseanna Cunningham

Member of the Scottish Parliament for Almond Valley Livingston (2007–2011)
- Incumbent
- Assumed office 3 May 2007
- Preceded by: Bristow Muldoon
- Majority: 8,909 (24.3%)

Personal details
- Born: 15 July 1970 (age 56) Blackburn, West Lothian, Scotland
- Party: Scottish National Party
- Spouse: Garry Knox (m. 2000)
- Children: 1
- Education: University of Glasgow; University of Stirling
- Profession: Social worker

Angela Constance (born 15 July 1970) is a Scottish politician who has served as Cabinet Secretary for Health and Care since 2026. A member of the Scottish National Party (SNP), she has been the Member of the Scottish Parliament (MSP) for Almond Valley since 2007.

Born in West Lothian, Constance studied at the University of Glasgow and University of Stirling, before working as a social worker in the Lothians. She served as a councillor for West Lothian Council, where she was a spokesperson for children's services and lifelong learning. In the 2007 Scottish Parliament election, Constance was elected as a member of the Scottish Parliament for the Livingston constituency. As an SNP backbencher she served as a member of the Scottish Commission for Public Audit and justice committee.

Constance was appointed to the Scottish Government in 2010 and served under First Minister Alex Salmond as the minister for skills and lifelong learning and the following year she was reshuffled as the minister for children and young people. She later served as the youth employment minister, before the portfolio was expanded and promoted to cabinet-level in 2014 as the Cabinet Secretary for Training, Youth and Women's Employment. Following the resignation of Nicola Sturgeon as depute leader of the SNP when she announced her candidacy for leader, Constance ran unsuccessfully in the 2014 depute leadership contest, losing to Stewart Hosie.

Sturgeon was successful in her bid for leader and was subsequently sworn in as first minister and appointed Constance as education secretary. In a cabinet reshuffle in 2016, she was appointed the Equalities Secretary and oversaw the introduction of social security powers in Scotland. Constance left government in 2018 to sit as a backbencher. In 2020, Sturgeon appointed her to the new portfolio of drugs policy minister after record high drug deaths in Scotland. On 29 March 2023, newly appointed First Minister Humza Yousaf re-appointed Constance to cabinet as the Justice Secretary. In November 2023, she became Chairman and Business Convener of the Scottish National Party.

== Early life ==
Angela Constance was born on 15 July 1970 in Blackburn, West Lothian, the daughter of Simon Constance, a coalminer, and Mary Baird Constance (née Colquhoun). She was educated at West Calder High School and later Bo’ness Academy.

Constance attended the University of Glasgow, where she gained an MA in Social Science. At Glasgow University, she served on the Students' Representative Council, becoming president of the council in 1991. Alastair Allan was her sabbatical vice president. She earned a Certificate of Welfare Studies from West Lothian College and an MSc in Social Work from the University of Stirling.

Before her election to Holyrood, Constance worked as a social worker and was a Councillor for West Lothian Council where she was the SNP spokesperson for children's services and lifelong learning. She also stood for the SNP in the 2005 Livingston by-election, finishing second behind Scottish Labour with 32.7% of the vote.

== Cabinet minister (2014–2018) ==
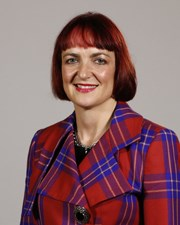
Official portrait, 2016

During the 2014 SNP spring conference, First Minister and SNP leader Alex Salmond promoted Constance to the Scottish Cabinet in the position of Cabinet Secretary for Training, Youth and Women’s Employment. In the position, Constance was somewhat criticised by the opposition Scottish Labour Party in the Scottish Parliament, claiming that since Constance, youth unemployment in Scotland had actually risen. In response to this, Constance stated:

These figures, based on data for 2013, show that the employment prospects are improving across much of Scotland, with women’s employment driving much of this improvement. “They also show that Scotland continues to outperformed the UK across all headline labour market indicators, with a lower unemployment rate, higher employment rate and lower economic inactivity rate.

Previously, Constance was a junior Scottish minister outside the Cabinet.

Following the election of Nicola Sturgeon as the First Minister, in November 2014, Constance was promoted as the Cabinet Secretary for Education within the Scottish Cabinet.

After the 2016 Scottish Parliament election, Nicola Sturgeon reshuffled her Cabinet. On 18 May, Constance was appointed as Cabinet Secretary for Communities, Social Security and Equalities.

== SNP Depute leadership bid, 2014 ==
Following defeat in the 2014 Scottish independence referendum, Scottish National Party leader and First Minister of Scotland Alex Salmond announced his resignation as SNP leader and First Minister of Scotland. In the aftermath of his resignation, a leadership bid was launched, and the then Deputy First Minister of Scotland and SNP Depute leader Nicola Sturgeon was widely tipped to become Salmond's successor.

On 30 September 2014, Constance officially launched her bid to become the Depute leader of the Scottish National Party, competing against Stewart Hosie and Keith Brown. It was later revealed by Constance that she was "not seeking the position of Deputy First Minister".

The results of the election were announced at the SNP Autumn Conference on 14 November, with Constance losing the contest to Stewart Hosie, after being eliminated in the first round.

== Return to government (2020–) ==
=== Minister for Drugs Policy (2020–2023) ===
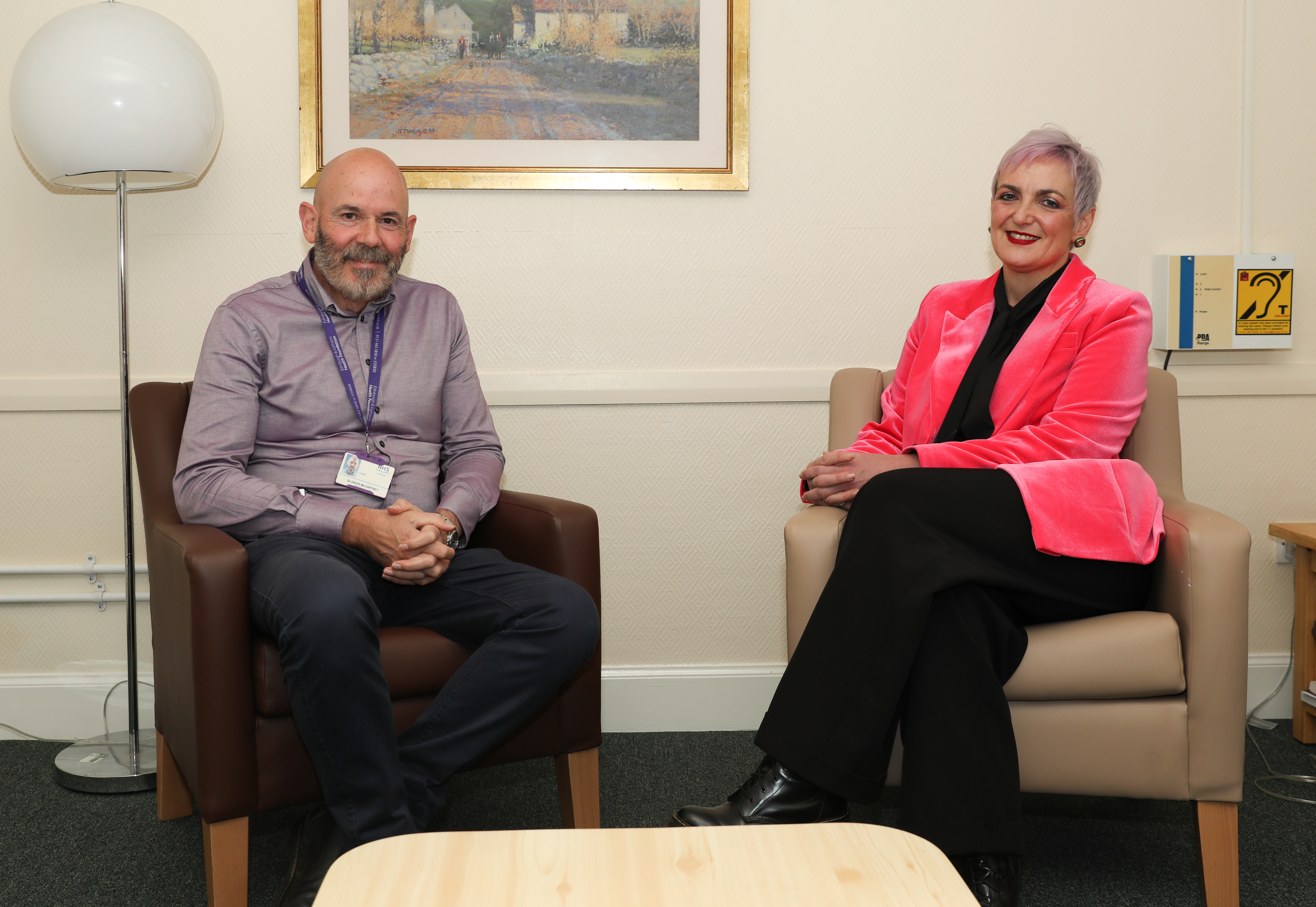
Constance announcing residential rehabilitation capacity increase, 2022

In December 2020 First Minister Nicola Sturgeon sacked Joe FitzPatrick as Public Health Minister after official figures revealed that 1,264 people in Scotland had died from drugs in 2019. The number of deaths was three and a half times higher the figure for England and Wales and by some margin the highest in Europe. Sturgeon described the SNP's record on drugs as "indefensible" and Constance was given a full time ministerial portfolio with responsibility for the crisis. The appointment was not universally welcomed; journalist Alex Massie opined in The Times that: "It says something, mind you, about the depth of talent available to Sturgeon that... she felt compelled to hand the drugs brief to Angela Constance, a minister she had previously demoted. Twice."

At the Scottish Parliament election on 6 May 2021, Constance was re-elected as MSP for Almond Valley. On 19 May 2021, she was re-appointed to the new government, retaining the post of Minister for Drugs Policy.

In November 2023, Constance was appointed as the SNP's Business Convener (party chair), succeeding Kirsten Oswald. The Business Convener is responsible for chairing the SNP's Party Conference and the National Executive Committee; overseeing the party's management, administration and operations, as well as the coordination of election campaigns; working with the Chief Executive of Headquarters in setting priorities.

=== Cabinet Secretary for Justice and Home Affairs (2023–2026) ===
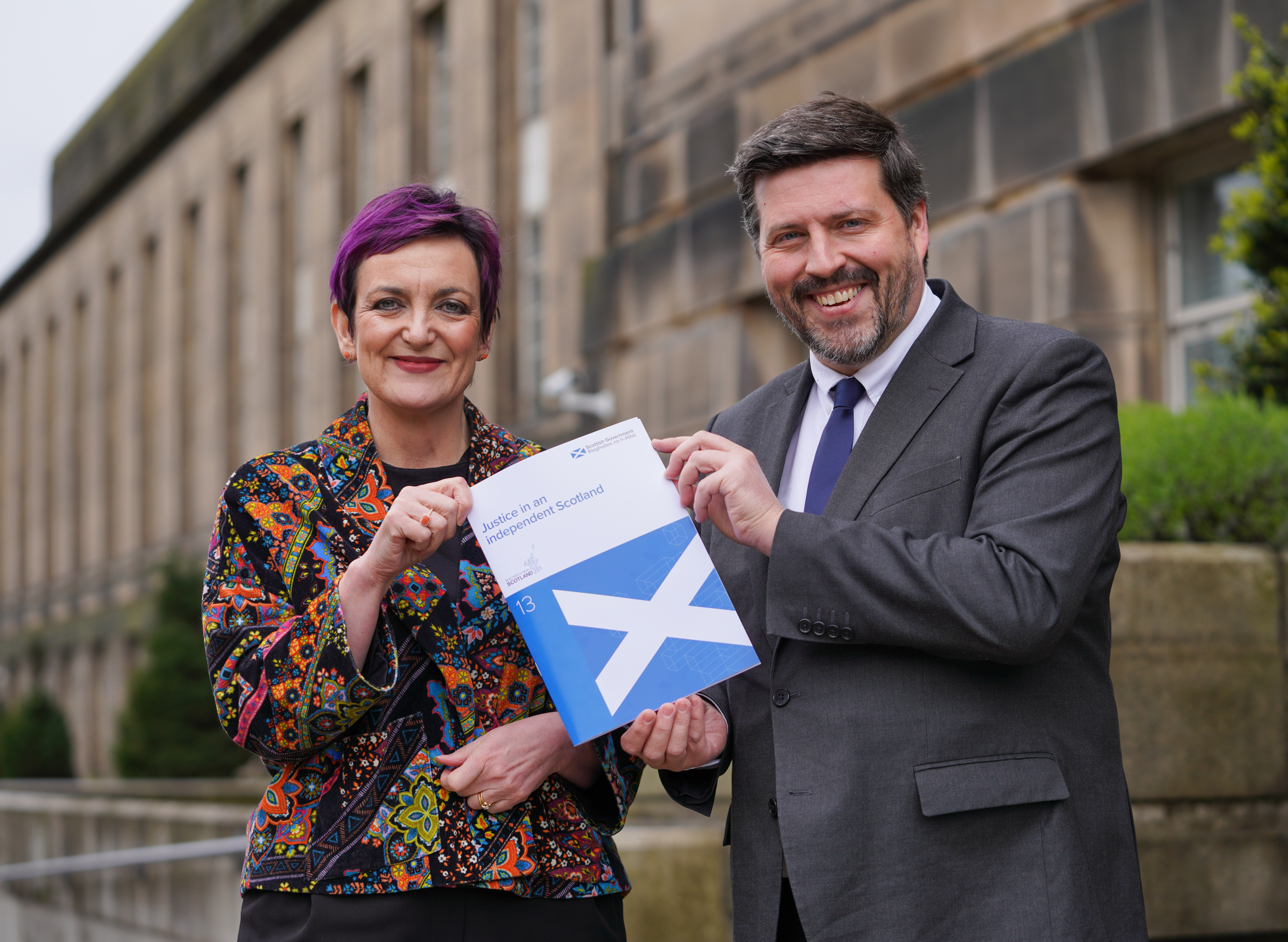
Constance launches Justice in an independent Scotland (Building a New Scotland paper), 2024

On 29 March 2023, newly elected first minister Humza Yousaf appointed Constance as Cabinet Secretary for Justice and Home Affairs, marking a return to the Scottish cabinet for Constance following her departure from the cabinet during the third term of Nicola Sturgeon's premiership in 2018. Yousaf claimed he was "looking forward" to working with Constance on "delivering real, tangible improvements".

Following her appointment, Yousaf announced that both he and Constance had "agreed an ambitious range of outcomes" in order to modernise the Scottish justice system in order to "better focus on the needs of victims while ensuring rates of offending continue to be at historic lows". Additionally, Yousaf encouraged Constance to protect the independence of key justice agencies of the country as well as the Judiciary of Scotland. Additionally, Constance was tasked with reducing the court backlog created by the government restrictions introduced to mitigate COVID-19, work with both the Scottish Police Authority and Police Scotland to deliver a sustainable budget, conduct collaboration between Police Scotland and the Scottish Fire and Rescue Service to "further drive out inefficiencies and achieve operational efficiencies", responsible for the overview and implementation of the Hate Crime and Public Order (Scotland) Act 2021, updating of the Equally Safe strategy and support the implementation of "trauma-informed knowledge" and the associated skills framework for staff in justice organisations across Scotland.

Constance was re–appointed Cabinet Secretary for Justice and Home Affairs by new first minister John Swinney in May 2024.

In winter 2025, Constance was accused of misleading the Scottish Parliament over the issue of expanding an inquiry into the grooming gangs scandal to Scotland. Constance told MSPs in September 2025 that Professor Alexis Jay, who chaired the Independent Inquiry into Child Sexual Abuse in England and Wales, had advised the Scottish Government that a further inquiry into child sexual abuse was not necessary. Jay subsequently emailed Constance to say that her position had been misrepresented, and said that Scottish ministers "should urgently take steps to establish reliable data about the nature and extent of child sexual exploitation by organised networks". While a correction was published by the Scottish Government, Jay emailed Constance again in November describing their position as unsatisfactory. The Scottish Government subsequently announced a national review of evidence on the operation of grooming gangs in Scotland, including Professor Jay. Scottish Conservatives leader Russell Findlay accused Constance of a breach of the ministerial code by misleading the Scottish Parliament as to Jay's advice.

The Scottish Conservatives put forward a motion for a vote of no confidence in Constance, which was supported by both Scottish Labour and the Scottish Liberal Democrats. In an open letter published in the Daily Record, the mother of a grooming gang victim who had been gang raped at the age of thirteen while in care appealed to the Scottish Parliament to support the motion against Constance, writing; "The survivors have told me that they no longer have confidence in Justice Secretary Angela Constance. That trust is completely broken. Cabinet colleagues who come out in support of her will not change that. The only people whose confidence matters are survivors, and they say, 'We've lost it.' Any MSP who chooses to support her in this vote is choosing politics over victims." On 16 December 2025, the Scottish Parliament rejected the motion of no confidence by 67 votes to 57 after the Scottish Green Party voted with the SNP to protect Constance. At a session of Holyrood's education committee the following day, Constance offered a public apology to Professor Jay and said that she welcomed the parliamentary record being amended to clarify her past comments, but reiterated her belief that these were not a breach of the ministerial code and did not warrant an investigation.

On 23 December 2025, the Scottish Government's independent advisers for the Scottish Ministerial Code notified John Swinney of their intent to investigate Constance over whether her remarks regarding Professor Jay constituted a ministerial code breach. On 6 January 2026, the independent advisers reported that Constance had breached the ministerial code in her comments to parliament, though stated that this was without intent to mislead. Constance was given a written reprimand and told to make a statement to parliament to update the official record.

=== Cabinet Secretary for Health and Care (2026–present) ===
On 20 May, Constance was appointed Cabinet Secretary for Health and Care in the Second Swinney Government.

== Personal life ==
Constance has been married to Garry Knox since 2000. After her election to Holyrood, Constance announced she was expecting her first child, Cyrus in October 2007.

Scottish Parliament
Preceded by Bristow Muldoon	Member of the Scottish Parliament for Livingston; 2007–2011	Constituency abolished
New constituency	Member of the Scottish Parliament for Almond Valley; 2011–present	Incumbent
Political offices
Preceded by Keith Brown	Minister for Skills and Lifelong Learning; 2010–2011	Succeeded by Alasdair Allan
Preceded by Adam Ingram	Minister for Children and Young People; 2011	Succeeded by Aileen Campbell
New office	Minister for Youth Employment; 2011–2014	Succeeded by Roseanna Cunningham
New office	Cabinet Secretary for Training, Youth and Women’s Employment; 2014	Succeeded by Roseanna Cunningham
Preceded by Michael Russell	Cabinet Secretary for Education and Lifelong Learning; 2014–2016	Succeeded by John Swinney
Preceded by Alex Neil	Cabinet Secretary for Communities, Social Security and Equalities; 2016–2018	Succeeded by Aileen Campbell
New office	Minister for Drugs Policy; 2020–present	Incumbent
