= Michael Russell (Scottish politician) =

Scottish politician

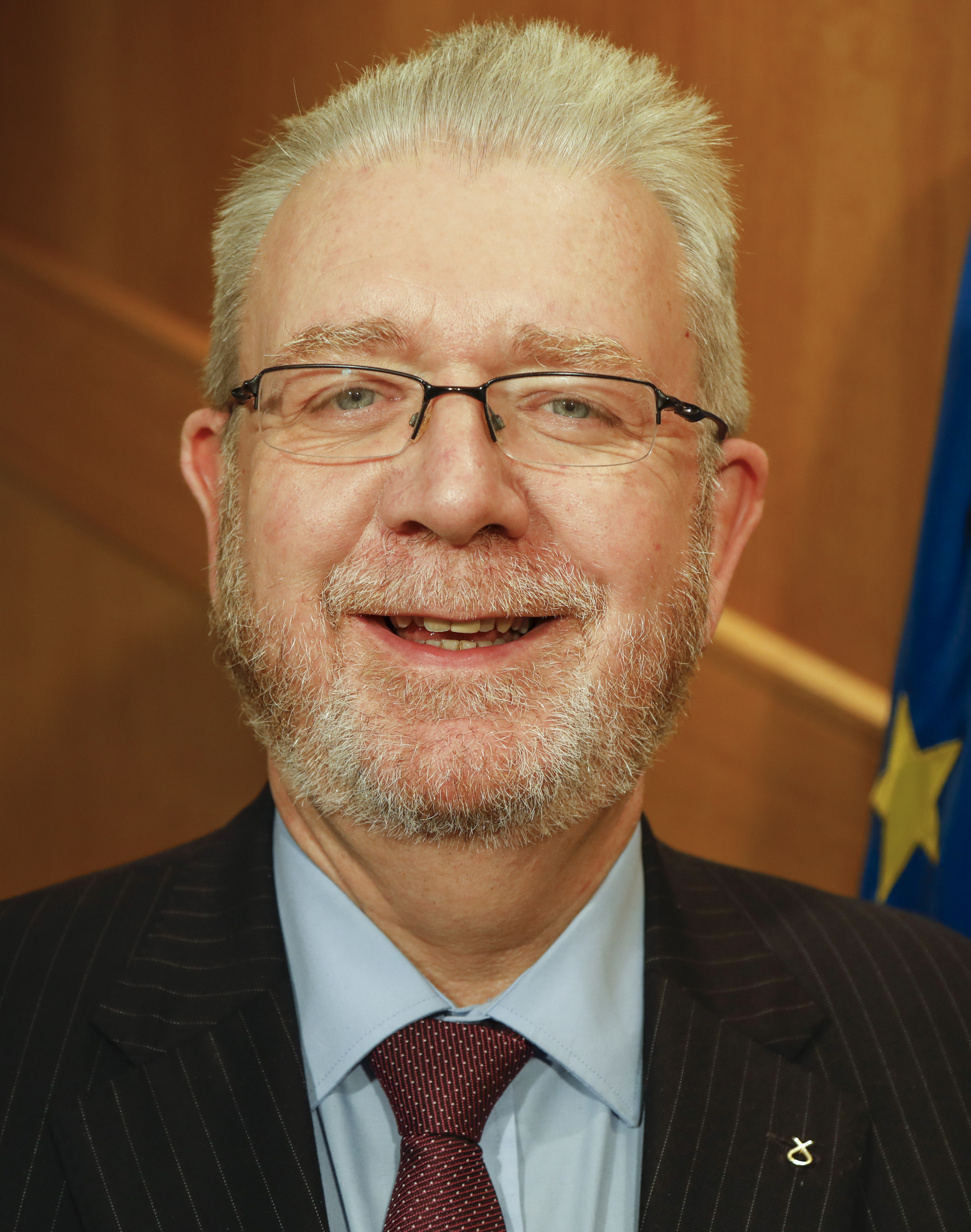
- Official portrait, 2016

Chairman of the Scottish Land Commission
- Incumbent
- Assumed office 1 February 2024
- Land Secretary: Mairi Gougeon
- Preceded by: Andrew Thin
SNP party positions
President of the Scottish National Party
In office 30 November 2020 – 1 December 2023
Leader	Nicola Sturgeon; Humza Yousaf
Preceded by	Ian Hudghton
Succeeded by	Maureen Watt
Chief Executive Officer of the Scottish National Party
Acting; 18 March 2023 – 12 April 2023
Leader	Nicola Sturgeon; Humza Yousaf
Preceded by	Peter Murrell
Succeeded by	Murray Foote
In office 1994–1999
Leader	Alex Salmond
Preceded by	Office established
Succeeded by	Peter Murrell
Ministerial offices
Cabinet Secretary for the Constitution, Europe and External Affairs
In office 17 February 2020 – 19 May 2021
First Minister	Nicola Sturgeon
Preceded by	Himself (Constitutional Relations); Fiona Hyslop (External Relations)
Succeeded by	Angus Robertson
Cabinet Secretary for Government Business and Constitutional Relations
In office 26 June 2018 – 17 February 2020
First Minister	Nicola Sturgeon
Preceded by	Derek Mackay (Constitution); Bruce Crawford (Government Strategy; 2012)
Succeeded by	Himself
Cabinet Secretary for Education and Lifelong Learning
In office 1 December 2009 – 21 November 2014
First Minister	Alex Salmond
Preceded by	Fiona Hyslop
Succeeded by	Angela Constance
Minister for UK Negotiations on Scotland's Place in Europe
In office 25 August 2016 – 26 June 2018
First Minister	Nicola Sturgeon
Preceded by	Office established
Succeeded by	Office abolished
Minister for Culture, External Affairs and the Constitution & Minister for Gaelic
In office 12 February 2009 – 1 December 2009
First Minister	Alex Salmond
Preceded by	Linda Fabiani
Succeeded by	Fiona Hyslop
Minister for Environment
In office 17 May 2007 – 12 February 2009
First Minister	Alex Salmond
Preceded by	Sarah Boyack
Succeeded by	Roseanna Cunningham
Parliamentary offices
Member of the Scottish Parliament for Argyll and Bute
In office 5 May 2011 – 5 May 2021
Preceded by	Jim Mather
Succeeded by	Jenni Minto
Member of the Scottish Parliament for South of Scotland (1 of 7 Regional MSPs)
In office 3 May 2007 – 22 March 2011
In office 6 May 1999 – 31 March 2003

Personal details
- Born: 9 August 1953 (age 73) Bromley, Kent, England
- Party: Scottish National Party
- Spouse: Cathleen McAskill (m. 1980)
- Children: 1
- Education: Edinburgh University

Michael William Russell (born 9 August 1953) is a Scottish politician serving as Chairman of the Scottish Land Commission since 2024, having previously served in the Scottish Cabinet under Alex Salmond and Nicola Sturgeon. A member of the Scottish National Party (SNP), he was the Member of the Scottish Parliament (MSP) for Argyll and Bute from 2011 to 2021, and a list MSP for South of Scotland from 1999 to 2003 and 2007 to 2011.

Russell previously worked as a television producer and director and the author of seven books. He was Chief Executive of the SNP from 1994 to 1999 and was elected to the Scottish Parliament as a regional MSP for the South of Scotland at the first Scottish Parliament election in 1999. However, he lost his seat in the 2003 Scottish Parliament election. He was elected again in May 2007 and was appointed Minister for Environment in Scotland's first-ever SNP administration by First Minister Alex Salmond.

He was then reshuffled on 10 February 2009 to become Minister for Culture, External Affairs and the Constitution, and was later promoted to the Scottish Cabinet on 1 December 2009 replacing Fiona Hyslop as Cabinet Secretary for Education and Lifelong Learning until November 2014, when he was sacked by new First Minister Nicola Sturgeon. He became a backbencher and was a professor of culture and governance at the University of Glasgow from 2015 to 2016. Russell later served in the second Sturgeon government as Minister for UK Negotiations on Scotland's Place in Europe from August 2016 to June 2018. He returned to the Cabinet in 2018 as Cabinet Secretary for Government Business and Constitutional Relations, later Cabinet Secretary for the Constitution, Europe and External Affairs, before standing down at the 2021 Scottish Parliament election. Russell was elected President of the SNP in November 2020 and resigned from this position in December 2023 ahead of his appointment as Chairman of the Scottish Land Commission. He stepped in as acting Chief Executive of the SNP from March to April 2023 following Peter Murrell’s resignation.

== Background ==
Russell was born in Bromley, Kent to an English mother and a Scottish father. He grew up in Troon, where he attended Marr College. He went to Edinburgh University, where he studied first theology and then Scottish history and literature. He worked in television and the media prior to establishing his own media company, Eala Bhan Ltd.

Russell is conversant in Gaelic and gave a speech in the language which was the first occasion the European Council was addressed in Gaelic.

== Political career ==
=== Joining the SNP ===
Originally a member of the Labour club at Edinburgh University, Russell joined the SNP in 1974 during the February election of that year, was active in Edinburgh, in the Western Isles and in the Inverness constituency and stood for the first time for as an SNP candidate in 1984 in Clydesdale in a local government election. He was then the Clydesdale candidate for the Westminster Parliament in June 1987. Later that year he became the elected Vice Convenor of the SNP responsible for Publicity (succeeding Alex Salmond) and in 1990 was Salmond's campaign manager during the SNP leadership campaign.

During that time he worked as executive director of Network Scotland, a media and educational company, but he gave up his party posts in 1991 to concentrate on establishing his own TV production company, Eala Bhan Ltd. He returned to active politics in December 1994 when he became the SNP's first full-time Chief Executive. In that role, he was the party's election director for the 1997 and 1999 campaigns as well as for the successful Perth and Kinross by-election in 1995 (having been deputy campaign director in the 1992 General Election and for the Govan and Glasgow Central by-elections of 1987 and 1988).

=== SNP Chief Executive ===
Russell was Chief Executive of the SNP in the period prior to the first Scottish election of 1999 and has been an active member of the SNP for over three decades, often working closely with former party leader Alex Salmond.

=== Scottish Parliament ===
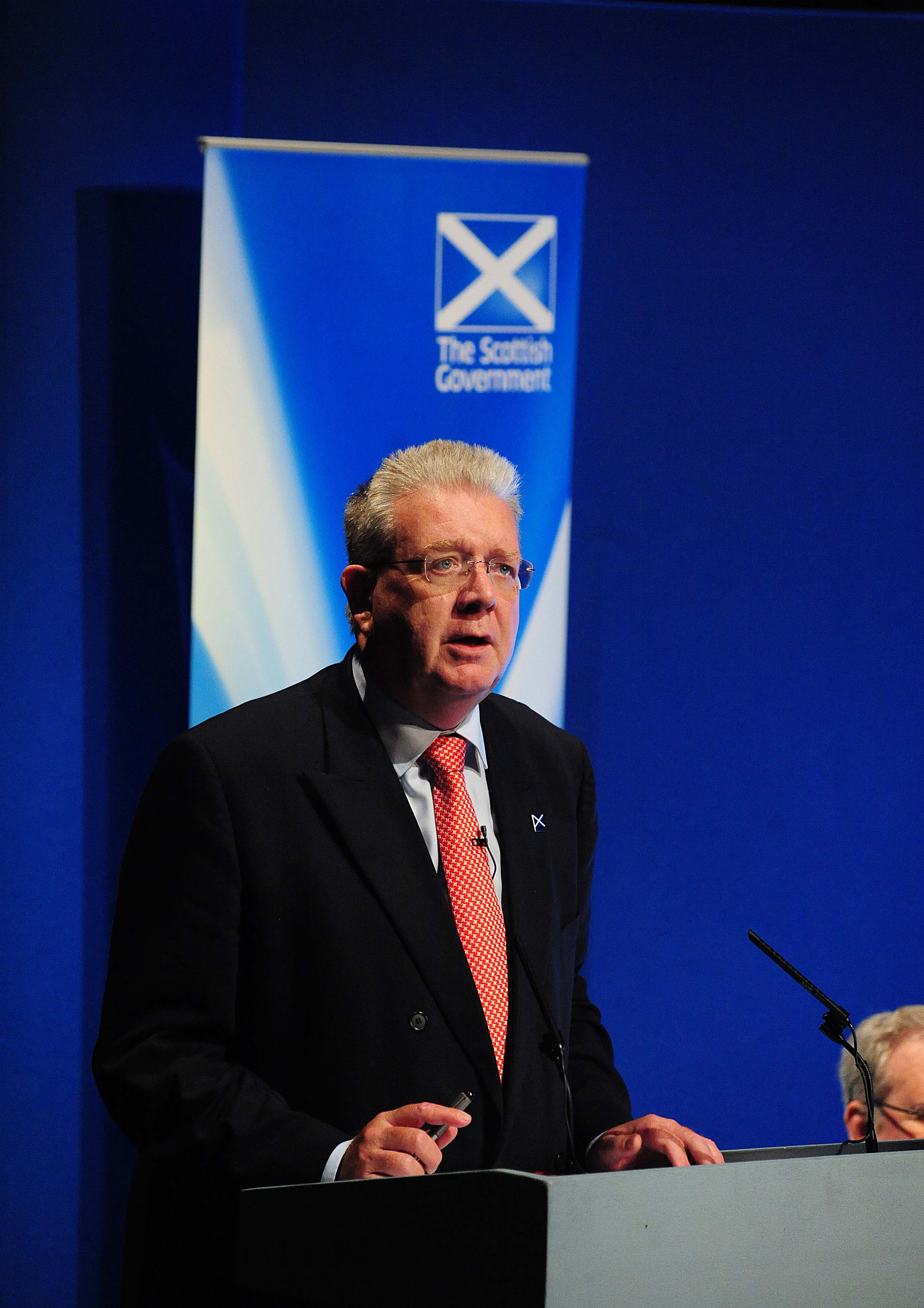
Russell attending a Scottish Cabinet meeting in Stranraer as Cabinet Secretary for Education & Lifelong Learning in August 2011

==== Election ====
He was placed second by the party on the South of Scotland list for the 1999 Scottish Parliament elections (as well as standing for the Cunninghame South Constituency which he also fought in 2003) and after his election was appointed SNP Business Manager in the new Parliament which resulted in him becoming a founding member of the Parliamentary Bureau. After John Swinney was elected leader of the SNP in 2000, Russell became Shadow Minister for Education and Culture, a post he held until 2003. In this role, he lodged the first no confidence motion to be voted on in the Scottish Parliament following the 2000 SQA examination controversy. However, Sam Galbraith, the minister the motion was directed at, survived the vote. He was named as "Debater of the Year" in the Herald Awards in 2000, and was nominated for "Scottish Politician of the Year" in the same awards in 2002 as well as for the Channel 4 "Scottish Politician of the Year" title.

When he lost his seat at the end of the first Scottish Parliament, Russell focused on his work as an author and newspaper columnist, commenting on various aspects of Scottish culture and Scottish politics. He did, however, stand for the leadership of the SNP in 2004, in the election prompted by John Swinney's resignation. He finished third behind Alex Salmond and Roseanna Cunningham. Russell continued as a political commentator, generating some controversy with his strongly free market views in his book, Grasping The Thistle, in which he called for the NHS to be abolished and replaced with an insurance based healthcare system. It also called for inheritance tax and the Barnett Formula to be scrapped and a voucher system introduced for education.

Many SNP members saw Russell's absence from the Scottish Parliament as a great loss to the SNP's profile and performance there. In 2006 he was once again placed second on the SNP regional list in the South of Scotland though this time the list was chosen by a one member, one vote system for which Russell had argued over a long period and was re-elected to Parliament in 2007. He was also the party's candidate in the Dumfries constituency.

==== Cabinet appointment ====
Following the SNP's narrow victory at the 2007 Scottish Parliament election, Russell was appointed the Minister for Environment. In the first reshuffle of the SNP Government in February 2009, Russell was moved to be Minister for Culture, External Affairs and the Constitution.

In December 2009 Russell was promoted to the Scottish Cabinet as Cabinet Secretary for Education and Lifelong Learning following the repositioning of Fiona Hyslop to Culture, Tourism and External Affairs.

Russell left the Scottish Cabinet in November 2014, when Nicola Sturgeon took over as First Minister.

==== Cabinet Secretary for Scotland's EU future ====
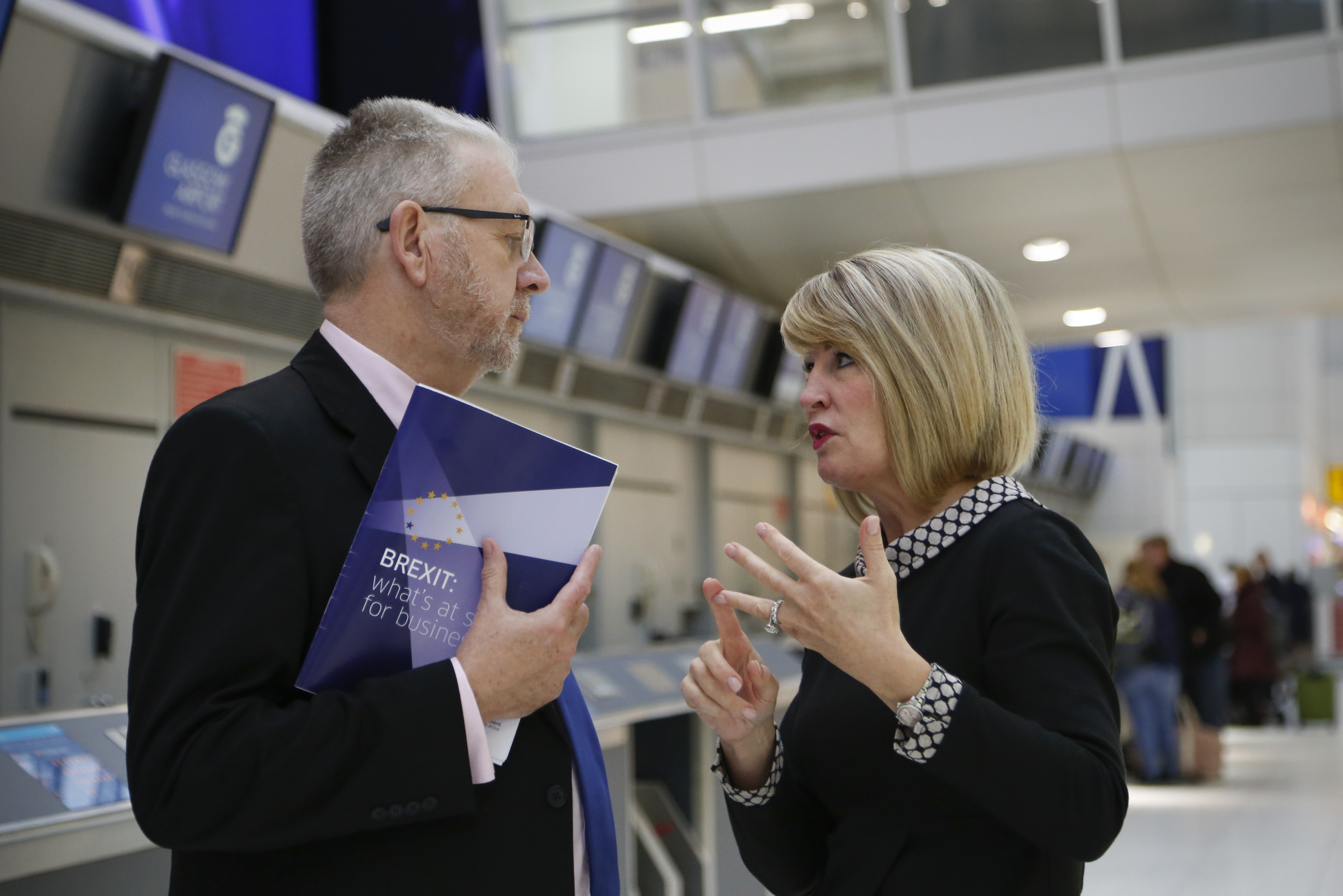
Russell at Glasgow Airport, discussing Brexit implications on the economy and business

On 25 August 2016 he was appointed as the Scottish government's new minister with responsibility for Brexit negotiations with the UK government.

==== Covid–19 pandemic ====
During the pandemic he called for Britain to join the EU's vaccine procurement scheme, tweeting about the British Government's decision to go it alone: "This idiotic refusal is all about Brexit and nothing to do with the pandemic. It will cost lives.".

He announced in 2020 that he would not be standing for re-election in 2021.

=== Post-Scottish Parliament ===
In November 2020 he was elected to the honorary position of SNP President – having campaigned on a platform of holding an independence referendum in autumn 2021. Russell won 60% of the vote, beating political blogger Craig Murray, who placed second, and former MP Corri Wilson, who placed third.

In response to Operation Branchform and the arrest of Peter Murrell, Russell claimed that the Scottish National Party was facing its biggest crisis in 50 years.

In December 2022, Russell was elected unopposed to the Colintraive & Glendaruel Community Council.

== Campaigner ==
For many years, Russell has campaigned for justice on behalf of former police detective, Shirley McKie, who was awarded £750,000 compensation by the Scottish Executive in a February 2006 out-of-court settlement. The Justice 1 committee of the Scottish Parliament conducted a nine-month inquiry into the McKie case in 2006, and its report was published on 15 February 2007. In April 2007, Michael Russell and Shirley's father, Iain McKie, published a book on what they described as the worst miscarriage of justice in a generation: Shirley McKie – The Price of Innocence (ISBN 9781841585758). Shirley McKie's case assumed an international significance with a possible linkage to the case of convicted Lockerbie bomber, Abdelbaset al-Megrahi, who was granted leave to appeal against his conviction for a second time by the Scottish Criminal Cases Review Commission on 28 June 2007. Megrahi's appeal began in Edinburgh on 28 April 2009, and a public inquiry into the McKie case started in Glasgow on 2 June 2009.

Russell supported the successful campaign to have The Tinkers' Heart in Argyll listed as a Scheduled Monument, with listing taking place in 2015.

== Academic career ==
In May 2015, the University of Glasgow announced that Russell would be taking up a part-time post as a professor of culture and governance.

== Controversies ==
Russell attracted criticism regarding the negative depictions of Scottish towns and cities included in his 1998 travel book In Waiting: Travels in the Shadow of Edwin Muir. In his book, Russell said of Glasgow: "Pull over and stop the car (if you dare) and walk into the closes smelling of urine and rubbish, cluttered with dirt and debris. It is not uncommon to have to step over a comatose body, with or without a needle by its side." The Scottish capital was also described in a less than positive light: "The flag on Edinburgh Castle is an awful mutant tablecloth and the National Trust for Scotland is arrogant and elitist."

In November 2009, Russell was engaged in a controversy when his most senior aide was forced to resign after being exposed by the News of the World as the author of an online political blog with controversial content.

In January 2011 Russell was referred to the parliamentary standards watchdog over allegations that he tried to influence school closures for his own electoral benefit. "The MSP was reported to Holyrood's standards watchdog after a leaked email revealed he quizzed SNP councillors about their support for the axing of local schools. The message, sent from Mr Russell's parliamentary account, concerned proposed closures in the area where he is due to seek election in May. He now represents the South of Scotland but will stand as a candidate in Argyll & Bute." Kilmodan Primary, the school nearest to Russell's home was later amongst those saved from closure as well as Toward Primary where his wife Cathleen was headteacher (Cathleen had also been headteacher at Kilmodan). In January 2011 Mrs Russell transferred to Sandbank Primary School, which was safe from closure.

Russell was also accused of interfering in school closure decisions taken by councils. "The Convention of Scottish Local Authorities (Cosla), the body which represents council leaders, has now written to Mr Russell accusing him of failing to act in a "consistent, pragmatic and limited way"." Russell was further accused of "bullying" in his dealings with Shetland Islands Council where the council was asked to postpone cost-cutting school closures. "Mr Russell was last night accused of "bullying" councils into agreeing to his moratorium. A senior local government source said: 'Russell is acting like a school bully on this and bullying councils into backing this delay.'"

During the 2023 Scottish National Party leadership election, Russell was criticised for describing the SNP's political opponents as "enemies". During a dispute over whether to publicise the party's membership numbers, Russell defended the performance of the SNP's National Secretary, Lorna Finn, and wrote on Twitter; "I am disgusted by the abuse directed at SNP staff by individuals who damage our cause & aid our enemies." Russell's language was denounced as inflammatory: the Scottish Conservatives described it as "a telling and depressing insight" into how the SNP viewed disagreement. Health Secretary and future SNP leader and First Minister Humza Yousaf also distanced himself from Russell's remarks. Chris McElney, the general secretary of the Alba Party, also denounced Russell's remarks as "harmful to public discourse and will increase likelihood of harm against political opponents by calling them enemies. Many of us already receive threats fuelled by hyperbolic attacks. Hardly the way to win people over from No to Yes." Russell refused to apologise for his statement and wrote in The National that the SNP is "subject to increasingly vicious and unprincipled attacks by their fearful opponents. Enemies is not too strong a word for those people, not least because their actions are designed to disrupt and defeat the norms of democracy."

== Books and publications ==
Russell has written several books, including:

- Michael Russell, ed. (1990). Glasgow – The Book.
- Michael Russell, ed. (1992). Edinburgh – A Celebration. Mainstream Publishing. ISBN 978-1-85158-517-5.
- Michael W. Russell (1997). A Poem of Remote Lives: Images of Eriskay, 1934 – Enigma of Werner Kissling, 1895–1988. Neil Wilson Publishing. ISBN 978-1-897784-46-4.
- Michael W. Russell (1998). In Waiting: Travels in the Shadow of Edwin Muir. Neil Wilson Publishing. ISBN 978-1-897784-63-1.
- Michael Russell (2002). A Different Country: Photographs by Werner Kissling. Werner Kissling (photog.). Birlinn Ltd. ISBN 978-1-84158-245-0.
- Winnie Ewing (2004). Michael Russell (ed.). Stop the World – The Autobiography of Winnie Ewing. Birlinn Ltd. ISBN 978-1-84158-239-9.
- Dennis MacLeod; Michael Russell (2006). Grasping the Thistle: How Scotland Must React to the Three Key Challenges of the Twenty First Century. Argyll Publishing. ISBN 978-1-902831-86-2.
- Michael Russell (2007). The Next Big Thing: A Fable of Modern Scotland. Balnakeil Press. ISBN 978-1-905974-00-9.
- Ian McKie; Michael Russell (2007). Shirley McKie: The Price of Innocence. Birlinn Ltd. ISBN 978-1-84158-575-8.

== Personal life ==
Russell married Cathleen MacAskill, a primary school head teacher, in March 1980 and they have one son, Cailean. Since August 1992 the family have lived in an 18th-century single storey farm dwelling in Glendaruel on the Cowal peninsula in Argyll and Bute.

Russell previously separated from his wife for a time after he lost his seat at Holyrood in 2003 and had an affair with his researcher Eilidh Bateman. Bateman, who was 21 years his junior, later dumped Russell just 10 days after he publicly announced he was leaving his wife.

Scottish Parliament
Preceded by Jim Mather	Member of the Scottish Parliament for Argyll and Bute; 2011–2021	Succeeded by Jenni Minto
Party political offices
Preceded by Ian Hudghton	President of the Scottish National Party; 2020–2023	Vacant
Preceded by Alex Salmond	Scottish National Party Vice Convenor for Publicity; 1987–1991	Succeeded by John Swinney
New office	Chief Executive of the Scottish National Party; 1994–1999	Vacant Title next held by Peter Murrell
