= Peter Peacock =

British politician (born 1952)

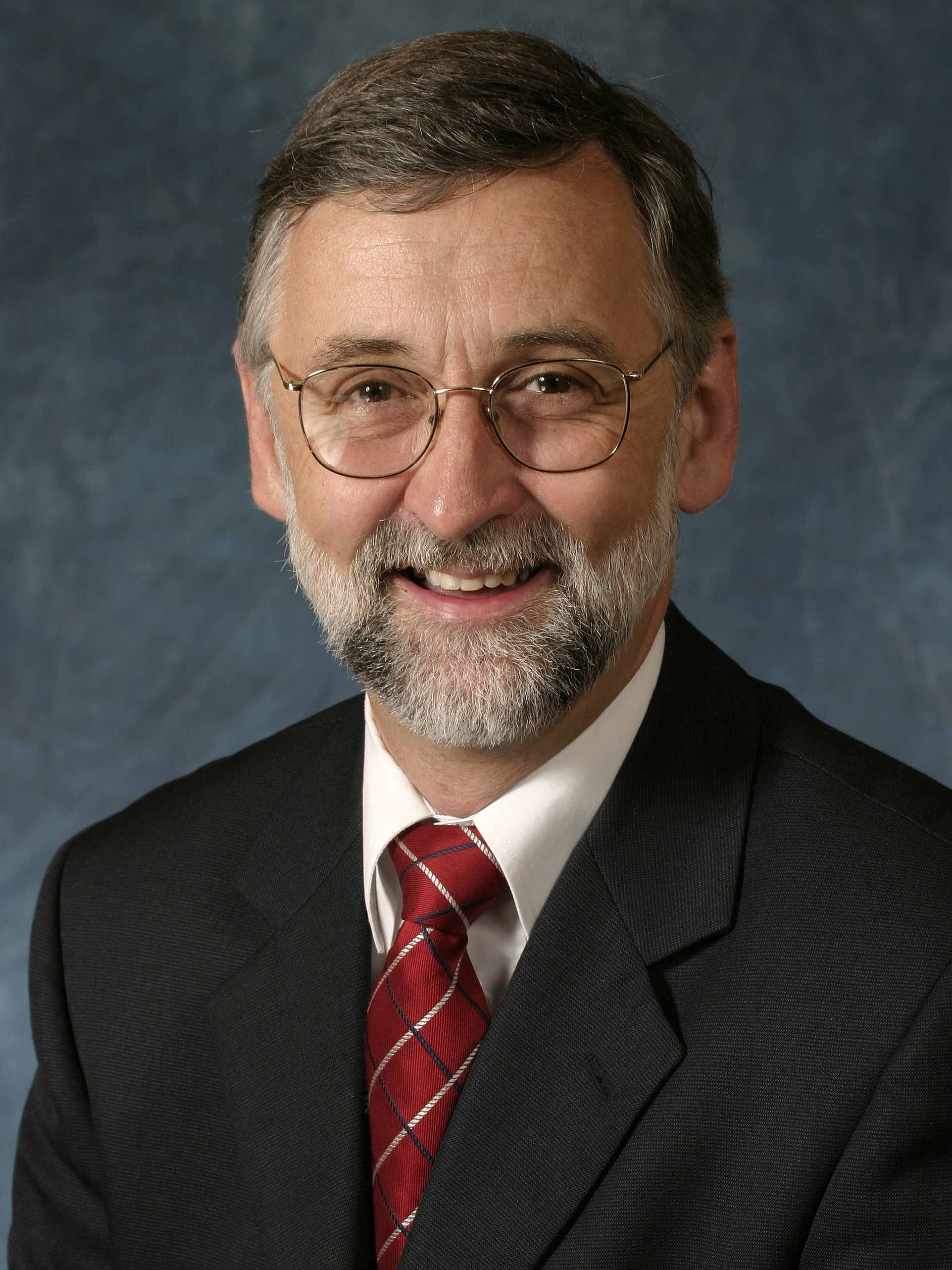

Member of the Scottish Parliament for Highlands and Islands (1 of 7 Regional MSPs)
- In office 6 May 1999 – 22 March 2011

Personal details
- Born: 27 February 1952 (age 74) Edinburgh, Scotland
- Party: Scottish Labour Party

Peter James Peacock CBE (born 27 May 1952) is a Scottish politician who served as Minister for Education and Young People from 2003 to 2006. A member of the Scottish Labour Party, he was a Member of the Scottish Parliament (MSP) for the Highlands and Islands region from 1999 to 2011.

Peacock was convener of the Highland Regional Council from 1995 to 1999. He served on the Board of Scottish Natural Heritage and was later influential in the decision to move the agency's headquarters to Inverness.

Peacock was appointed a deputy minister when first elected at the 1999 Scottish Parliament election. He was promoted to Minister for Education and Young People in the Scottish Executive after the 2003 election.

Due to his position, Peacock was chosen to officially open the newly refurbished Morgan Academy in Dundee, Scotland, in August 2004; after the fire that destroyed the building in 2001. He resigned from his government post in November 2006 due to ill health.

Political offices
| Preceded by Cathy Jamieson | Minister for Education and Young People; 2003–2006 | Succeeded by Hugh Henry |
| Preceded by Mike Watson | Minister for Gaelic; 2003–2006 | Succeeded by Patricia Ferguson |
| New office | Deputy Minister for Finance and Local Government; 2000–2003 | Succeeded by Tavish Scott |
| New office | Deputy Minister for Children and Education; 1999–2000 | Succeeded by Nicol Stephen as Deputy Minister for Education, Europe and External Affairs |
