= Sense Scotland =

Sense Scotland is a Scottish charity and specialised social care provider, formalized in 1985. The charity’s aim is to support individuals and their families to live their best lives by providing innovative and sustainable services.. Services are located all over Scotland with the charity’s head office based in Glasgow. The charity also provides information about complex communication support needs and participates in disability rights campaigns. Sense Scotland’s work is mainly funded by Local Government through contracts for services provided. It also raises money through donations, legacies, community fundraising, events, retail and corporate partnerships.

== History ==
On 11 June 2011 Sense Scotland announced that former MSP Andy Kerr had been appointed to the vacant CEO position. He took over from interim CEO Joyce Wilson who held the position after former Chief Executive Gillian Morbey OBE left to head Sense and Sense International in October 2010. Morbey has been instrumental in setting up Sense Scotland and became its first staff member in 1985. She received an OBE in 1995 for her service to the deafblind community.

In 2013, Sense Scotland launched their Early Years project, aiming to help families with children aged up to eight years old with communication support needs.

In 2016, the charity officially opened TouchBase Lanarkshire, a support centre based in Hamilton, South Lanarkshire. This was followed by the opening of TouchBase Ayrshire, in Ardrossan, in 2017.

In 2022, Angela Bonomy was appointed as Chief Executive Officer of Sense Scotland. In the same year, RNIB's Visual Impairment and Learning Disability (VILD) services were transferred across to Sense Scotland, resulting in the creation of two new TouchBases in Bishopbriggs and Kirkcaldy.

In 2026, PHEW Short Breaks - a respite centre based in Motherwell for people with additional support needs - was fully incorporated into Sense Scotland.

== Activities ==
=== Support Services ===
The charity offers support services to children, young people and adults with complex communication needs throughout their lives. Sense Scotland’s services include day care, short breaks, supported living, housing support, skills development, arts and outdoor sessions and social clubs.

=== Advice & Information Services ===
Sense Scotland provides information to people with complex communication support needs and their families. The charity employs family advisers who pay home visits throughout Scotland and inform people with disabilities on resources available to them. The advisers also inform people on communication development support and possible sources of funding. They also answer questions and concerns about their disability.

=== Influencing Public Policy ===
Core to the work of Sense Scotland is making sure the people they work with are informed of government policy and help them understand what policies mean to them. The charity is also committed to ensure the thoughts and views of people with disabilities are heard by the Scottish government.

=== Arts ===
Sense Scotland offer art sessions to the people they support, which include music sessions, storytelling sessions, and visual and tactile art sessions. They have organised art exhibitions in Dundee in 2023 and in Glasgow in 2022 and 2026.

== Fundraising ==
The charity organizes fundraising events all year round for individuals and groups to join. In 2010 The Stand Comedy Club in Glasgow started organizing an annual benefit night in aid of the work of Sense Scotland. Since then, Sense Scotland has organised and takes part in multiple fundraising events every year, including the Kiltwalk, Ladies' Lunches, and Balls.

== Charity Shops ==
Sense Scotland has a charity retail division that consists of a number of charity shops throughout Scotland. The charity opened their first shop on Dumbarton Road at Kelvinhall Subway Station in Glasgow in 1986 where it still opens its doors to trade most days of the week.

Sense Scotland shops are predominantly staffed by volunteers and each shop has its own paid shop manager and shop assistant. The shops division is highly dependent on donations of used goods from the public and sells second hand furniture in selected stores. Sense Scotland invites donors of goods to Gift Aid their donations allowing the charity to get extra money by claiming the tax back from the Government.

== See also ==
- Sense for Deafblind People
- The Tipping Point Report - The human and economic costs of cutting disabled people's support
