= The Tinkers' Heart =

Architectural structure in Argyll and Bute, Scotland

- The Gypsy's Heart, Gypsies' Heart, The Gypsy's Wedding Heart
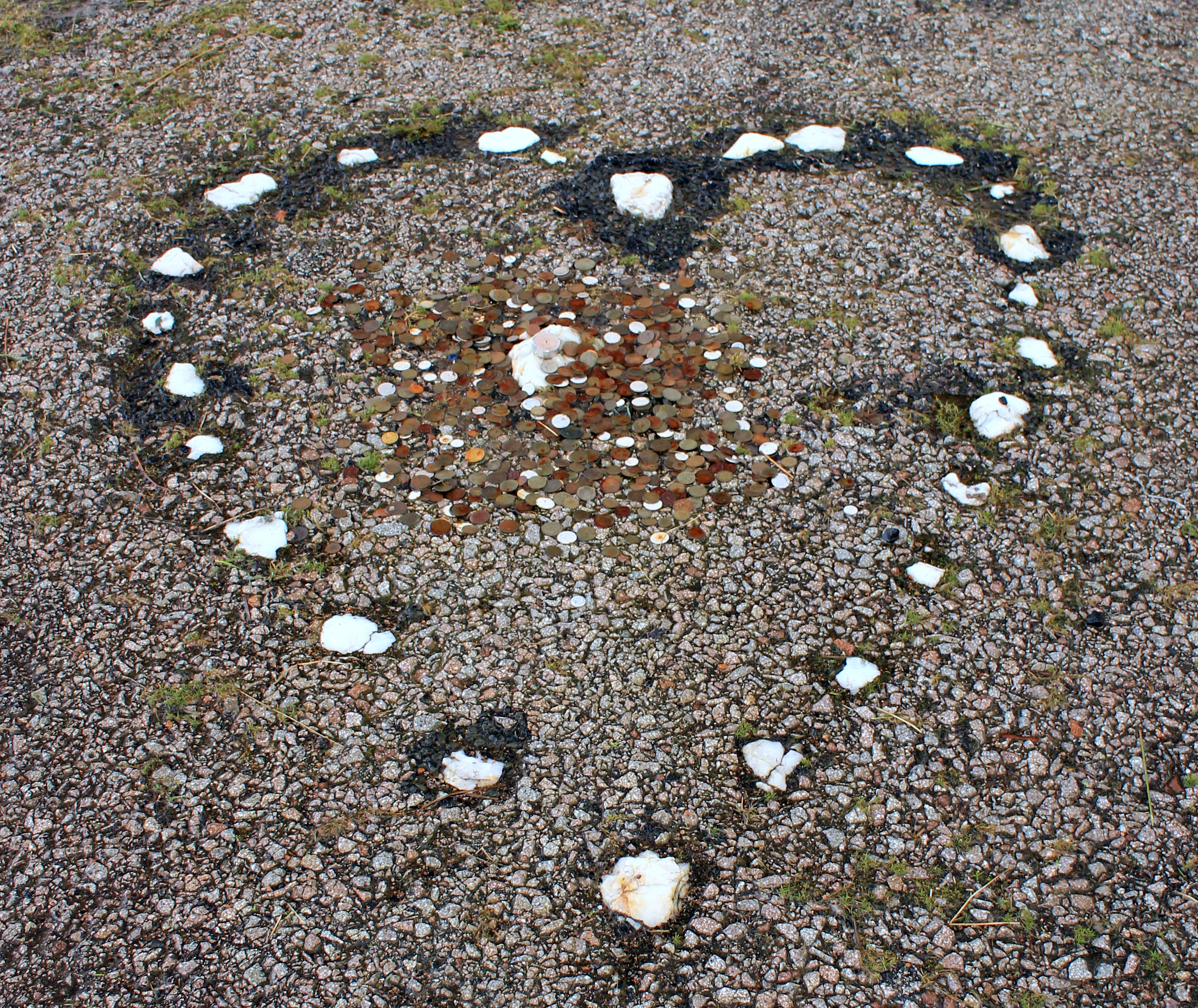
- Interactive map of The Tinkers' Heart
- 56°13′58″N 4°58′27″W
- Cultures: Scottish Travellers
- Location: Argyll and Bute, Scotland

Site notes
- Length: 1.75 m (5.7 ft)
- Width: 1.4 m (4.6 ft)

The Tinkers' Heart is a Scottish Travellers' commemorative monument near the village of Cairndow by Loch Fyne in Argyll and Bute, Scotland. It is also known as the Gypsy's Heart, Gypsies' Heart or Gypsy's Wedding Heart. It is scheduled as a Monument of National Importance.

A field visit in 2012 shows the Heart as being made up of a heart-shape of 25 visible quartz pebbles, with a 26th pebble in the centre, and measuring 1.75 metres (5.7 ft) by 1.4 metres (4.6 ft). Research done by Historic Scotland in 2015 concluded that from the evidence available, it was the only example in Scotland of a permanent physical Scottish Travellers' memorial.

== Origins ==
The Scottish travelling community maintain that the Heart was established as a monument to local tinkers who joined the Jacobite Rising of 1745, and weddings have been celebrated at the site since the mid-1800s. The Heart was removed during roadworks in 1928, but local protests forced its reinstatement. The monument's location was originally at the junction of the Strachar Road (A815 road) and the Hell's Glen (B839), but this junction was bypassed by new road building in the 1960s, thus placing the monument in a field.

== Campaign for scheduled monument status ==
In 2008, Argyll and Bute council proposed a programme of restoration work for the Heart; however, local citizens objected to the cost (£34,500) and undertook to care for the site themselves. Scheduled monument status had been investigated in 2012 but refused on the basis that the site did not meet the necessary criteria. Metal fencing was placed around the stones to protect them from cattle.

In May 2014, author Jess Smith lodged a petition with the Scottish Parliament, asking the Scottish Government to require Historic Scotland ‘to investigate what action can be taken to ensure the restoration and preservation of the Heart’. Although the petition was initially rejected, in February 2015 Historic Scotland announced that they would reconsider the application, this time taking equalities issues into consideration.

Historic Scotland launched a programme of research including a public consultation in March 2015, aimed initially at the travelling community, and local area residents. The consultation differed from those usually undertaken in similar situations, in that it took account of the significance of the oral tradition to the community to which the monument was of importance.

The research concluded in May 2015, and the site was added to the Schedule of Monuments in June 2015. The campaign was supported by the MSP for Argyll and Bute Michael Russell. Of the new methodology used in the consultation, Historic Scotland Director of Heritage Management Barbara Cummins said she hoped it would "pave the way for how we undertake our work in future.”

In February 2025, a new information panel explaining the history of the monument was unveiled at the site by Jess Smith. The story of the Tinkers' Heart features in Smith's book Button Bog, released in 2025.
