= Minister for Mental Wellbeing, Public Health, Sport, Alcohol & Drugs =

Junior ministerial post in the Scottish Government

- Scottish Gaelic: Ministear airson Poileasaidh Drogaichean is Deoch-làidir

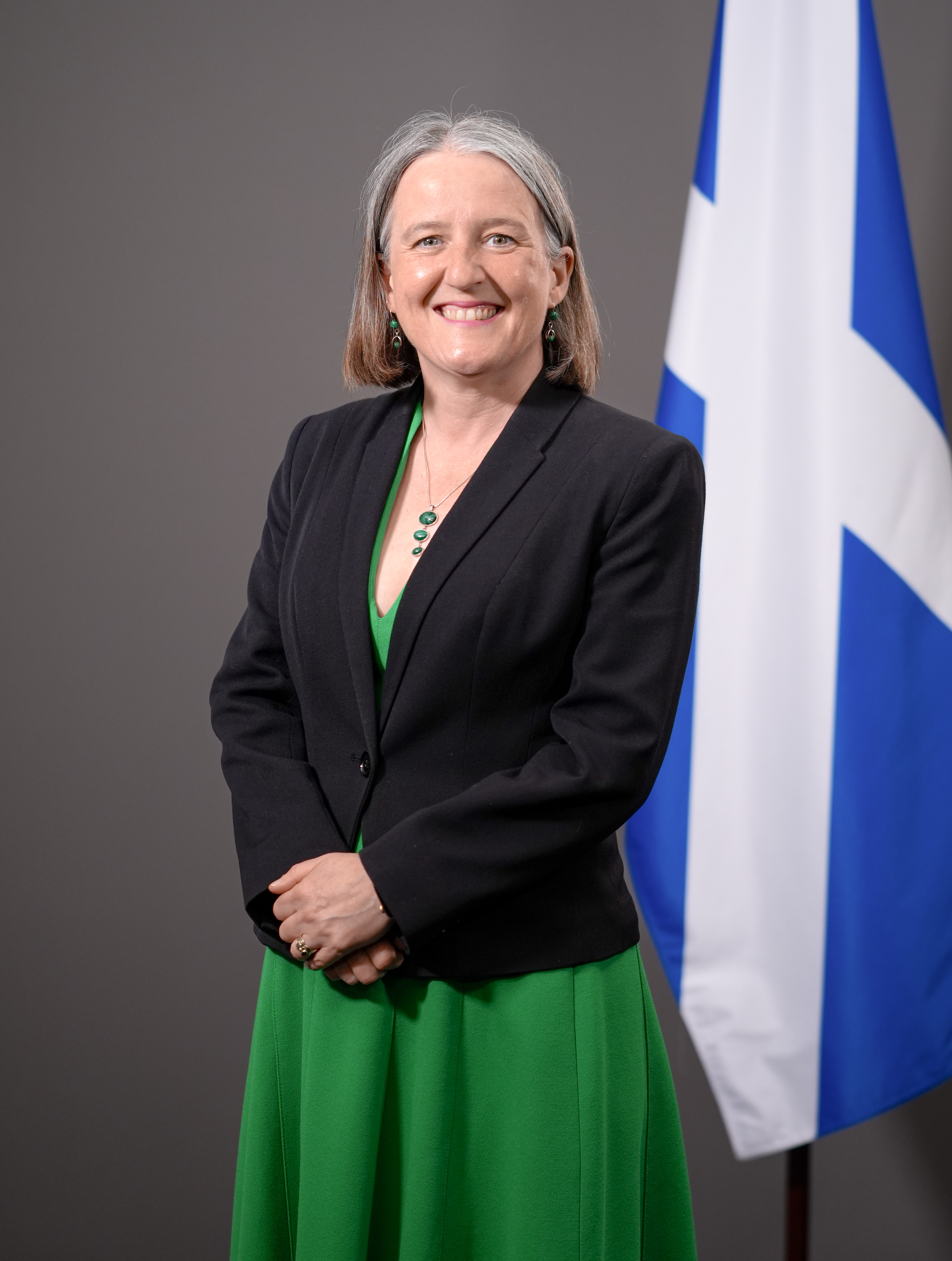
- Incumbent; Maree Todd since 11 June 2025
- Style: Minister (within parliament); Drugs Minister (informal); Scottish Drugs & Alcohol Policy and Sport Minister (outwith Scotland)
- Member of: Scottish Parliament; Scottish Government
- Reports to: Scottish Parliament
- Seat: Edinburgh
- Appointer: First Minister
- Inaugural holder: Angela Constance; Minister for Drugs Policy
- Formation: 18 December 2020
- Salary: £106,185 per annum (2024) (including £72,196 MSP salary)
- Website: www.gov.scot

The Minister for Mental Wellbeing, Public Health, Sport, Alcohol & Drugs is a junior ministerial post in the Scottish Government. As a result, the minister does not attend the Scottish Cabinet but reports to the Cabinet Secretary for Health and Social Care who does.

== History ==
The office was created in December 2020 by First Minister Nicola Sturgeon following the resignation of Minister for Public Health, Joe FitzPatrick. His resignation was triggered by the figures released that showed Scotland again had the worst drug death rate in Europe. Sturgeon stated that her government had taken their "eye off the ball on drug deaths" and appointed Angela Constance to take on the new dedicated role as Minister for Drugs Policy.

Following the 2023 SNP leadership election, incumbent First Minister Humza Yousaf appointed Elena Whitham as the renamed Minister for Drugs and Alcohol Policy. On 7 February 2024, Whitham announced she resigning from the post due to her suffering from PTSD. The following day, as part of a wider cabinet reshuffle, triggered by the resignation of Health Secretary, Michael Matheson, Yousaf appointed Christina McKelvie to the post. In June 2024, McKelvie announced that she had breast cancer and that she would go on leave while she underwent treatment for it. On March 10 2025, McKelvie announced that due to her health problems caused by the breast cancer, she would not run for reelection in 2026 and planned to continue her cancer treatment. Unfortunately, McKelvie died on March 27 2025 of the breast cancer.

On 11 June 2025, Maree Todd was appointed to the newly renamed role as Minister for Drugs & Alcohol Policy and Sport. Todd had previously been Minister for Social Care, Mental Wellbeing and Sport and retained her responsibility for the sport portfolio when appointed.

== Overview ==
=== Responsibilities ===
The specific responsibilities of the minister are:

- Tackling and reducing the harm of problem substance use
- Supporting the rehabilitation and recovery of those living with drug or alcohol dependency
- Reducing drug related deaths
- Alcohol treatment
- Reducing drinking at hazardous and harmful levels
- Alcohol harm prevention, harm reduction and recovery
- Sport and physical activity

== List of office holders ==
=== Minister for Drugs Policy ===
Name	Portrait	Assumed office	Left office	Party	First Minister
Angela Constance		18 December 2020	29 March 2023	Scottish National Party	Nicola Sturgeon
=== Minister for Drugs and Alcohol Policy ===
Elena Whitham		29 March 2023	7 February 2024	Scottish National Party	Humza Yousaf
Christina McKelvie		8 February 2024	27 March 2025 (died in office)	Scottish National Party	Humza Yousaf; John Swinney
=== Minister for Drugs & Alcohol Policy and Sport ===
Maree Todd		12 June 2025	Incumbent	Scottish National Party	John Swinney
