= Minister for Environment, Biodiversity and Land Reform =

Junior ministerial post in Scottish government

The Minister for Environment, Biodiversity and Land Reform was a junior ministerial post in the Scottish Government. As a result, the Minister did not attend the Scottish Cabinet, but supported the Cabinet Secretary for Net Zero, Energy and Transport who continues to attend the cabinet.

The last previous Minister for Environment, Biodiversity and Land Reform was Màiri McAllan.

== Overview ==
=== Responsibilities ===
The Minister for Environment, Biodiversity and Land Reform had specific responsibility for:

- land reform & land use
- Royal Botanic Garden
- environmental quality
- natural resources, peatland and flooding
- Scottish Land Commission
- Hydro Nation
- Drinking Water Quality Regulator
- private water
- forestry & woodlands
- Forestry and Land Scotland
- Scottish Forestry
- EU Support and related services
- Forest Research (cross-border services)
- environmental and climate justice
- Crown Estate Scotland
- marine planning
- national parks and natural heritage
- plant health
- GM

Since 2021, the Minister shared responsibility for biodiversity with the Minister for Green Skills, Circular Economy and Biodiversity.

== List of office holders ==
=== Minister for Rural Affairs and the Natural Environment ===
Name	Portrait	Entered office	Left office	Party	First Minister
Mairi Gougeon		27 June 2018	21 December 2020	Scottish National Party	Nicola Sturgeon
Ben Macpherson		21 December 2020	20 May 2021	Scottish National Party	Nicola Sturgeon
=== Minister for Environment, Biodiversity and Land Reform ===
Màiri McAllan		20 May 2021	29 March 2023	Scottish National Party	Nicola Sturgeon

== See also ==
- Scottish Parliament
