= Minister for Innovation, Technology and Tertiary Education =

Portfolio in the Scottish Government

- Scottish Gaelic: Ministear airson Foghlam Àrd-ìre agus Adhartach

- Incumbent; Alyn Smith since 8 September 2026
- Member of: Scottish Parliament; Scottish Government
- Reports to: Scottish Parliament
- Seat: Edinburgh
- Appointer: First Minister
- Inaugural holder: Maureen Watt Minister for Schools and Skills
- Formation: 17 May 2007
- Salary: £106,185 per annum (2024) (including £72,196 MSP salary)
- Website: www.gov.scot

The Minister for Innovation, Technology and Tertiary Education is a Junior ministerial post in the Education Department of the Scottish Government. As a result, the Minister does not attend the Scottish Cabinet. The post was created in May 2007 after the appointment of the Scottish National Party minority government and the Minister reports to the Cabinet Secretary for Education and Skills, who has overall responsibility for the portfolio, and is a member of cabinet. The Minister has specific responsibility for further education and colleges, higher education and universities, science and STEM (science, technology, engineering and mathematics, student funding, youth work, and widening access to education.

The post is one of two reporting to the Cabinet Secretary for Education and Skills, alongside the Minister for Children and Young People.

== History ==
The responsibilities of the junior ministerial reporting to the Education Secretary have changed considerably over time. The post was originally focused on schools: from 1999 to 2000, responsibility for schools rested with the Minister for Children and Education, which became the Minister for Education, Europe and External Affairs in the McLeish Government of 2000 to 2001. From 2001 to 2007, the schools portfolio rested with the Minister for Education and Young People. The skills brief also rested with the Minister for Enterprise and Lifelong Learning between 1999 and 2007.

The First Salmond government, formed following the 2007 Scottish Parliament election, created the junior post of the Minister for Schools and Skills who assisted the Cabinet Secretary for Education and Lifelong Learning, in the Scottish Executive Education Department. This was then retitled on 7 December 2011 following the creation of the Minister for Youth Employment post which took over the responsibility for skills and training. A further change occurred in May 2016, following Nicola Sturgeon's reshuffle. The post was rebranded as Minister for Further Education, Higher Education and Science.

The post was vacant for a period over as the summer of 2018, as First Minister Nicola Sturgeon's original choice, Gillian Martin, was revealed to have posted comments of a transphobic nature in a blog in 2007. Ms Martin's name was omitted from the list of appointments to be approved by Parliament on 28 June 2018 following a reshuffle. Richard Lochhead was later appointed to the role. Following the formation of the Third Sturgeon government, the post was once more retitled to Minister for Higher Education and Further Education, Youth Employment and Training. In March 2023, Humza Yousaf appointed Graeme Dey to take over the post of Minister for Higher and Further Education where he returned to government after having resigned on health grounds during the Third Sturgeon Government in January 2022.

== Minister ==
=== Minister for Schools and Skills ===
Name	Portrait	Entered office	Left office	Party	First Minister
Maureen Watt		17 May 2007	10 February 2009	Scottish National Party	Alex Salmond
Keith Brown		12 February 2009	18 January 2010	Scottish National Party	Alex Salmond
=== Minister for Skills and Lifelong Learning ===
Keith Brown		18 January 2010	12 December 2010	Scottish National Party	Alex Salmond
Angela Constance		12 December 2010	20 May 2011	Scottish National Party	Alex Salmond
=== Minister for Learning and Skills ===
Alasdair Allan		20 May 2011	7 December 2011	Scottish National Party	Alex Salmond
=== Minister for Learning, Science and Scotland's Languages ===
Alasdair Allan		7 December 2011	18 May 2016	Scottish National Party	Alex Salmond
Alasdair Allan		20 November 2014	18 May 2016	Scottish National Party	Nicola Sturgeon
=== Minister for Further Education, Higher Education and Science ===
Shirley-Anne Somerville		18 May 2016	27 June 2018	Scottish National Party	Nicola Sturgeon
Richard Lochhead		4 September 2018	20 May 2021	Scottish National Party	Nicola Sturgeon
=== Minister for Higher Education and Further Education, Youth Employment and Training ===
Jamie Hepburn		20 May 2021	29 March 2023	Scottish National Party	Nicola Sturgeon
=== Minister for Higher Education and Further Education ===
Graeme Dey		29 March 2023	21 September 2025	Scottish National Party	Humza Yousaf
Ben Macpherson		21 September 2025	20 May 2026	Scottish National Party	John Swinney
=== Minister for Innovation, Technology and Tertiary Education ===
Ben Macpherson		20 May 2026	24 August 2026	Scottish National Party	John Swinney
Alyn Smith		8 September 2026	Incumbent	Scottish National Party	John Swinney

== See also ==
- Scottish Parliament
- Scottish Government
