= Minister for Green Skills, Circular Economy and Biodiversity =

Junior ministerial post in the Scottish Government

The Minister for Green Skills, Circular Economy and Biodiversity was a junior ministerial post in the Scottish Government. As a result, the minister did not attend the Scottish Cabinet but reported directly to the First Minister of Scotland. The only individual who held the post was Lorna Slater, who was appointed in August 2021 after the Bute House Agreement.

== History ==
The office was created in August 2021 alongside the Minister for Zero Carbon Buildings, Active Travel and Tenants’ Rights after the Scottish Government agreed a power-sharing deal with the Scottish Green Party. Following the dissolution of the Bute House Agreement on 25 April 2024 the post was abolished.

== Overview ==
=== Responsibilities ===
The specific responsibilities of the minister were:

- Green Industrial Strategy
- green skills
- circular economy
- Zero Waste Scotland
- nature recovery targets
- NatureScot
- biodiversity (along with the Minister for Environment, Biodiversity and Land Reform)
- national parks and natural heritage
- plant health
- Serving as a member of Cabinet Sub-Committee on Climate Emergency

== List of office holders ==
=== Minister for Green Skills, Circular Economy and Biodiversity ===
Name	Portrait	Assumed office	Left office	Party	First Minister
Lorna Slater	The official portrait of Minister Lorna Slater. She has blonde curly hair, and is smiling. In the background, a Scottish flag can be seen.	30 August 2021	25 April 2024	Scottish Green Party	Nicola Sturgeon; Humza Yousaf
=== Minister for Climate Action ===
Name	Portrait	Assumed office	Left office	Party	First Minister
Alasdair Allan		July 2024	June 2025	Scottish National Party	John Swinney
