= Linda Fabiani =

Scottish politician (born 1956)

Linda Fabiani HonFRIAS OSSI FCIH
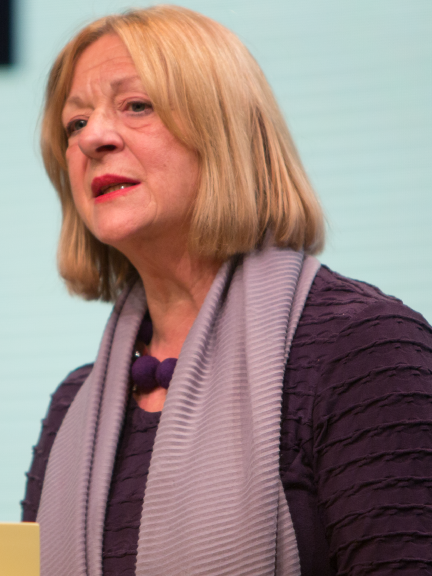
- Fabiani in 2019

Deputy Presiding Officer of the Scottish Parliament
- In office 12 May 2016 – 14 May 2021 Serving with Christine Grahame and Lewis Macdonald
- Presiding Officer: Ken Macintosh
- Preceded by: Elaine Smith
- Succeeded by: Annabelle Ewing

Convener of the Scottish Parliament Scotland Bill Committee
- In office 21 June 2011 – 23 March 2016
- Preceded by: Wendy Alexander

Minister for Europe, External Affairs, Culture and Gaelic
- In office 17 May 2007 – 12 February 2009
- First Minister: Alex Salmond
- Preceded by: Patricia Ferguson (Minister for Gaelic)
- Succeeded by: Michael Russell
Parliamentary offices
Member of the Scottish Parliament for East Kilbride
In office 5 May 2011 – 5 May 2021
Preceded by	Andy Kerr
Succeeded by	Collette Stevenson
Member of the Scottish Parliament for Central Scotland (1 of 7 Regional MSPs)
In office 6 May 1999 – 22 March 2011

Personal details
- Born: 14 December 1956 (age 69) Glasgow, Scotland
- Party: Scottish National Party
- Spouse: Duncan McLean

Linda Fabiani (born 14 December 1956) HonFRIAS OSSI FCIH is a Scottish politician who served as a Deputy Presiding Officer in the Scottish Parliament from 2016 to 2021. A member of the Scottish National Party (SNP), she was the Member of the Scottish Parliament (MSP) for the East Kilbride constituency from 2011 until her retirement in 2021. She was previously a regional member of the Scottish Parliament for the Central Scotland region from 1999 until 2011.

== Early life and career ==
Fabiani was born in Glasgow to a family with both Scottish and Italian roots. Prior to entering politics, she worked as director of East Kilbride Housing Association.

== Political career ==
At 1999, 2003 and 2007 elections, Fabiani unsuccessfully contested the first past the post constituency of East Kilbride finishing as runner up to Andy Kerr of Scottish Labour, reducing Labour's majority from 6,499 in 1999 to 1,972 in 2007. However, being listed at number five in the SNP regional list for Central Scotland in 1999, she gained a seat in the newly-established Scottish Parliament. She told the Dundee Courier in January 2021 that she had been surprised to get elected at her first attempt. Following the election of 2003, she served as the SNP's Deputy Spokesman on Communities inside the Scottish Parliament and chaired the Parliament's European and External Relations Committee.

In 2007, Fabiani was made Knight of the Order of the Star of Italian Solidarity by Italy in recognition of her work promoting links between Scotland and Italy.

With the SNP taking control of the Scottish Government after the 2007 election, Fabiani was appointed Minister for Europe, External Affairs and Culture. Half way through the SNP's term, she was replaced as minister by Mike Russell.

In 2009, she was made an Honorary Fellow of the Royal Incorporation of Architects in Scotland. She is a former Fellow of the Chartered Institute of Housing of Scotland.

In May 2011, in the first SNP gain of the election, Fabiani took the East Kilbride constituency from Andy Kerr. With Kerr widely touted as a potential successor to Labour leader Iain Gray, this was one of the major SNP victories of the election. On 21 June 2011 she became the Convener of the Scotland Bill committee.

After her election, she set up a constituency office in 1/3 Strathmore House in the town centre of East Kilbride.

After being re-elected in the 2016 election, Fabiani was elected as one of the two Deputy Presiding Officers of the Scottish Parliament.

In August 2020, Fabiani announced that she would not be seeking re-election in the 2021 Scottish Parliament election.

In her final term, Fabiani was chosen as convenor of the Scottish Parliamentary inquiry into the government's mishandling of claims made against Alex Salmond.

Scottish Parliament
Preceded by Andy Kerr	Member of the Scottish Parliament for East Kilbride; 2011–2021	Succeeded by Collette Stevenson
Political offices
New office	Minister for Europe, External Affairs and Culture; 2007–2009	Succeeded by Mike Russell as Minister for Culture, External Affairs and the Constitution
Preceded by Patricia Ferguson	Minister for Gaelic; 2007–2009	Succeeded by Mike Russell
