= Scottish Ministerial Code =

The Scottish Ministerial Code applies to members of the Scottish Government (the First Minister, Cabinet Secretaries, Law Officers and junior Scottish Ministers). The guidance is issued by the First Minister and is a collection of standards around expected behaviours and responsibilities. Since 2008 there has been a mechanism for an independent review of any suspected breaches of the code.

== History ==
Drafting of the new Scottish Ministerial Code was discussed at the first meeting of the Cabinet on 20 May 1999. It was based on a code used in Whitehall. The first version was issued in August 1999.

The 2008 version introduced changes that specifically prohibited ministers from making misleading statements in the Parliament chamber. In 2015 changes were made to allow Ministers to confirm whether they have received legal advice on a specific topic.

Ministerial parliamentary aides were originally not able to sit on committees that provided scrutiny of their Minister. This positions became known as Parliamentary Liaison Officers (PLOs) and the restriction was removed in 2007. In August 2016 A requirement was introduced for PLOs to declare this on the first occasion that they took part in parliamentary business within the remit of their Cabinet Secretary. By December this had been tightened up to extend to every occasion.

The February 2018 version contained new sections to guard against harassment, bullying and other such inappropriate behaviour.

== Scrutiny ==
In 2008 an independent Panel was created to review any concerns, with former Presiding Officers Lord David Steel and George Reid appointed. Steel and Reid left their positions in mid-2011. Following this Lord Peter Fraser and Dame Elish Angiolini were appointed. David Bell was appointed in October 2012, then in 2013 James Hamilton, a former director of public prosecutions on Ireland.

== Inquiries under the code ==
In 2009, First Minister Alex Salmond was cleared of a complaint leveraged by Tavish Scott, relating to exchanges at First Minister's Questions (FMQs) on the future of the Scottish Interfaith Council.
