= Cabinet Secretary for Fair Work, Skills and Training =

Scottish Government cabinet position

- Logo of the Scottish Government
- Appointer: First Minister
- Formation: 22 April 2014
- Succession: 18 May 2016
- Website: Scottish Government

The Cabinet Secretary for Fair Work, Skills and Training was a position in the Scottish Government cabinet. The Cabinet Secretary had overall responsibility for employment policy, women's employment, youth employment, the living wage and skills and employment training. The Cabinet Secretary was assisted by the Minister for Youth and Women's Employment.The position was abolished in May 2016, with employment issues moving to the Cabinet Secretary for Economy, Jobs and Fair Work, and training matters being dealt with by the Cabinet Secretary for Education and Skills.

== Responsibilities ==
Fair work – employment policy, women's employment, youth employment, the living wage, skills and employment training, implementation of the Wood Commission's recommendations, Skills Development Scotland.

== History ==
The position of Minister for Youth Employment was a junior ministerial post created on 7 December 2011 following the recommendations of the Smith Group. The Minister reported primarily to the First Minister but was also accountable to the Cabinet Secretary for Education and Lifelong Learning and Cabinet Secretary for Finance, Employment and Sustainable Growth. In April 2014, the brief became a Cabinet position, as Cabinet Secretary for Training, Youth and Women's Employment. In November 2014 the position was renamed as the Cabinet Secretary for Fair Work, Skills and Training, supported by the junior post of Minister for Youth and Women's Employment.

== Overview ==
=== Responsibilities ===
The responsibilities of the Cabinet Secretary for Fair Work, Skills and Training:

- employment policy
- women's employment
- youth employment
- the living wage
- skills and employment training
- implementation of the Wood Commission's recommendations

=== Public bodies ===
The following public bodies reported to the Cabinet Secretary for Fair Work, Skills and Training:

- Skills Development Scotland

== List of office holders ==
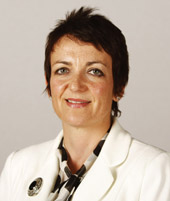
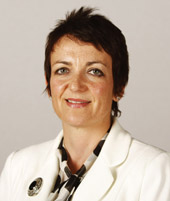
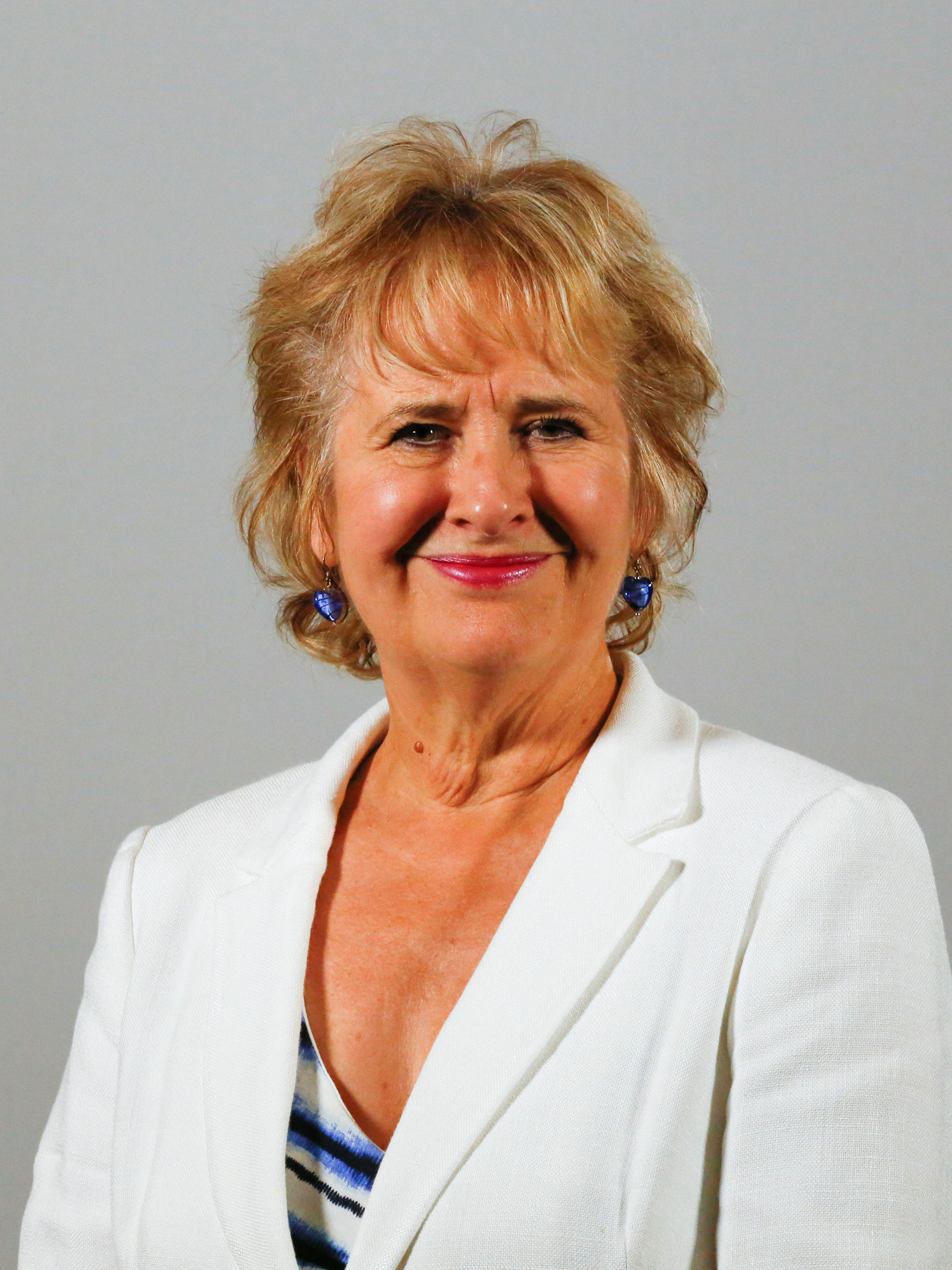
=== Minister for Youth Employment ===
| Name | Portrait | Entered office | Left office | Party |
| Angela Constance | | 7 December 2011 | 12 April 2014 | Scottish National Party |
=== Cabinet Secretary for Training, Youth and Women’s Employment ===
| Angela Constance | | 12 April 2014 | 21 November 2014 | Scottish National Party |
=== Cabinet Secretary for Fair Work, Skills and Training ===
| Roseanna Cunningham | | 21 November 2014 | 18 May 2016 | Scottish National Party |
