= Cabinet Secretary for Education, Culture and Gaelic =

Cabinet position in the Scottish Government

Scotland Cabinet Secretary for Education, Culture and Gaelic
- Scottish Gaelic: Rùnaire a' Chaibineit airson Foghlaim, Cultar agus Gàidhlig

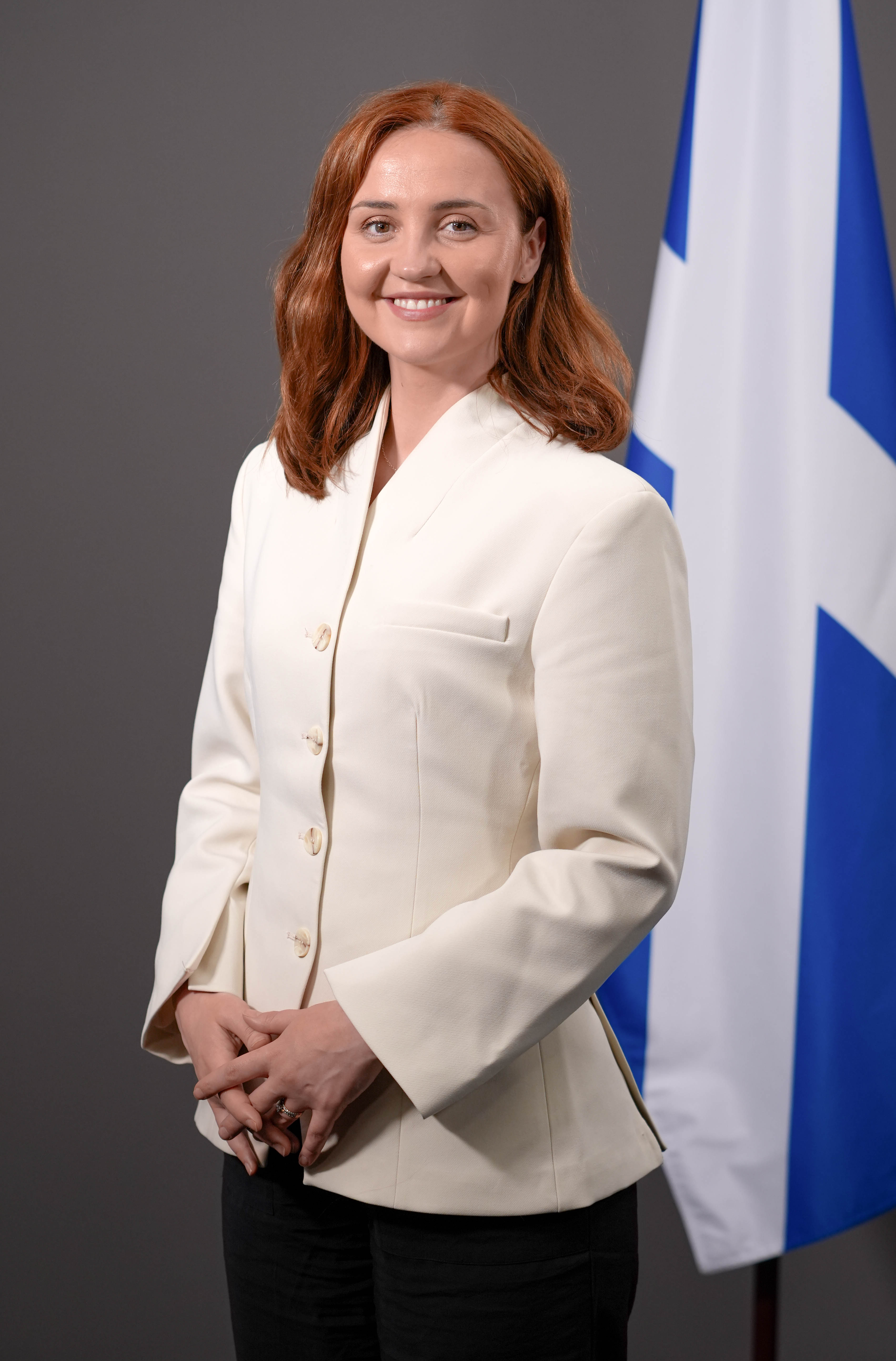
- Incumbent; Màiri McAllan since 20 May 2026
- Education Scotland; Scottish Government; Scottish Cabinet
- Style: Cabinet Secretary (within parliament); Education Secretary (informal); Scottish Education Secretary (outwith Scotland)
- Member of: Scottish Parliament; Scottish Cabinet
- Reports to: Scottish Parliament; First Minister
- Seat: Edinburgh
- Appointer: First Minister; (following approval from Scottish Parliament)
- Inaugural holder: Sam Galbraith; Minister for Education and Children
- Formation: 19 May 1999
- Deputy: Minister for Children, Young People and the Promise; Minister for Higher and Further Education
- Salary: £126,452 per annum (2024) (including £72,196 MSP salary)
- Website: www.gov.scot

The Cabinet Secretary for Education, Culture and Gaelic (Scottish Gaelic: Rùnaire a' Chaibineit airson Foghlaim, Cultar agus Gàidhlig), commonly referred to as the Education Secretary (Scottish Gaelic: Rùnaire an Fhoghlaim), is a position in the Scottish Government Cabinet responsible for all levels of education in Scotland. The incumbent is Màiri McAllan, who assumed office on 20 May 2026.

The Cabinet Secretary is supported by the Minister for Innovation, Technology and Tertiary Education, Alyn Smyth, and the Minister for Children, Young People and Keeping the Promise, Siobhian Brown.

== History ==
The position was created in 1999 as the Minister for Children and Education; it was renamed as the Minister for Education, Europe and External Affairs in 2000 and given more responsibilities; those were taken away from the post in 2001 and it was renamed again as the Minister for Education and Young People. The current position of Cabinet Secretary was created following the 2007 election.

== Overview ==
=== Responsibilities ===
The responsibilities of the Cabinet Secretary for Education, Culture and Gaelic include:

- Childcare and wraparound care
- School standards, quality and improvement, behaviour, inclusive education
- School infrastructure and staffing
- School learning, Additional Support Needs, support for learning
- Education Scotland
- Curriculum for Excellence development
- National Improvement Framework
- Teaching profession
- Removing barriers to education, closing attainment gap, supporting digital inclusion
- Positive destinations, school leavers toolkit, Education Maintenance Allowances
- Education strategy and performance, analytical services
- Languages of Scotland: Scottish Gaelic, Scots, British Sign Language
- Policy and support for culture, creative, arts, and architecture industries and festivals, supporting the creative workforce
- Museums and galleries, and cultural collections
- Broadcasting and screen
- Creative Scotland, national performing companies
- Intangible cultural heritage

=== Public bodies ===
The following public bodies report to the Cabinet Secretary for Education, Culture and Gaelic:

- Care Inspectorate
- Children's Hearings Scotland
- Creative Scotland
- Education Scotland
- National Galleries of Scotland
- National Museums Scotland
- Scottish Children's Reporter Administration
- Scottish Further and Higher Education Funding Council
- Scottish Qualifications Authority
- Scottish Social Services Council
- Student Awards Agency for Scotland

== List of office holders ==
=== Minister for Children and Education ===
Name	Portrait	Entered office	Left office	Party	First Minister
Sam Galbraith		19 May 1999	1 November 2000	Labour Party	Donald Dewar
=== Minister for Education, Europe and External Affairs ===
Jack McConnell		1 November 2000	22 November 2001	Labour Party	Henry McLeish
=== Minister for Education and Young People ===
Cathy Jamieson		28 November 2001	20 May 2003	Labour Party	Jack McConnell
Peter Peacock		20 May 2003	14 November 2006	Labour Party	Jack McConnell
Hugh Henry		14 November 2006	17 May 2007	Labour Party	Jack McConnell
=== Cabinet Secretary for Education and Lifelong Learning ===
Fiona Hyslop		17 May 2007	1 December 2009	Scottish National Party	Alex Salmond
Michael Russell		1 December 2009	21 November 2014	Scottish National Party	Alex Salmond
Angela Constance		21 November 2014	18 May 2016	Scottish National Party	Nicola Sturgeon
=== Cabinet Secretary for Education and Skills ===
John Swinney		18 May 2016	18 May 2021	Scottish National Party	Nicola Sturgeon
Shirley-Anne Somerville		19 May 2021	29 March 2023	Scottish National Party	Nicola Sturgeon
Jenny Gilruth		29 March 2023	20 May 2026	Scottish National Party	Humza Yousaf; John Swinney
=== Cabinet Secretary for Education, Culture and Gaelic ===
Màiri McAllan		20 May 2026	incumbent	Scottish National Party	John Swinney
