= List of Scottish National Party members of the Scottish Parliament =

This is a list of Scottish National Party MSPs. It includes all members of the Scottish Parliament (MSPs) who represented the Scottish National Party in the Scottish Parliament.

== List of MSPs ==
Name	Constituency or region	Type	Start year	End year
Brian Adam	North East Scotland	Region	1999	2003
Brian Adam	Aberdeen North	Constituency	2003	2011
Brian Adam	Aberdeen Donside	Constituency	2011	2013 (Note: Brian Adam died on 25 April 2013. The consequent Aberdeen Donside by-election was won by the SNP candidate Mark McDonald.)
George Adam	Paisley	Constituency	2011	
Karen Adam	Banffshire and Buchan Coast	Constituency	2021	
Clare Adamson	Central Scotland	Region	2011	2016
Clare Adamson	Motherwell and Wishaw	Constituency	2016	
Bashir Ahmad	Glasgow	Region	2007	2009 (Note: Bashir Ahmad died in February 2009. His seat as MSP for the Glasgow region passed to the next-placed person on the SNP's regional list: Anne McLaughlin.)
Alasdair Allan	Na h-Eileanan an Iar	Constituency	2007	
Christian Allard	North East Scotland	Region	2013 (Note: In May 2013, Mark McDonald resigned as MSP for the North East Scotland region, in order to fight the Aberdeen Donside by-election caused by the death of Brian Adam. He was replaced by the next person on the SNP's North East Scotland list: Christian Allard.)	2016
Heather Anderson	Dundee City West	Constituency	2026	
Tom Arthur	Renfrewshire South	Constituency	2016	
David Barratt	Cowdenbeath	Constituency	2026	
Colin Beattie	Midlothian North and Musselburgh	Constituency	2011	2026
Colin Beattie	Midlothian North	Constituency	2026	
Marco Biagi	Edinburgh Central	Constituency	2011	2016
Dawn Black	Angus North and Mearns	Constituency	2026	
Steven Bonnar	Uddingston and Bellshill	Constituency	2026	
Gary Bouse	Falkirk West	Constituency	2026	
Chic Brodie	South Scotland	Region	2011	2016
Alan Brown	Kilmarnock and Irvine Valley	Constituency	2026	
Keith Brown	Ochil	Constituency	2007	2011
Keith Brown	Clackmannanshire and Dunblane	Constituency	2011	
Siobhian Brown	Ayr	Constituency	2021	
Margaret Burgess	Cunninghame South	Constituency	2011	2016
Stephanie Callaghan	Uddingston and Bellshill	Constituency	2021	2026
Aileen Campbell	South of Scotland	Region	2007	2011
Aileen Campbell	Clydesdale	Constituency	2011	2021
Colin Campbell	West of Scotland	Region	1999	2003
Kate Campbell	Edinburgh Eastern, Musselburgh and Tranent	Constituency	2026	
Michelle Campbell	Renfrewshire North and Cardonald	Constituency	2026	
Roderick Campbell	North East Fife	Constituency	2011	2016
Willie Coffey	Kilmarnock and Loudoun	Constituency	2007	2011
Willie Coffey	Kilmarnock and Irvine Valley	Constituency	2011	2026
Angela Constance	Livingston	Constituency	2007	2011
Angela Constance	Almond Valley	Constituency	2011	
Bruce Crawford	Mid Scotland and Fife	Region	1999	2007
Bruce Crawford	Stirling	Constituency	2007	2021
Roseanna Cunningham	Perth	Constituency	1999	2011
Roseanna Cunningham	Perthshire South and Kinross-shire	Constituency	2011	2021
Martyn Day	Falkirk East and Linlithgow	Constituency	2026	
Graeme Dey	Angus South	Constituency	2011	2026
Natalie Don-Innes	Renfrewshire North and West	Constituency	2021	2026
Nigel Don	North East Scotland	Region	2007	2011
Nigel Don	Angus North and Mearns	Constituency	2011	2016
James Dornan	Glasgow Cathcart	Constituency	2011	
Bob Doris	Glasgow	Region	2007	2016
Bob Doris	Glasgow Maryhill and Springburn	Constituency	2016	2026
Bob Doris	Glasgow Kelvin and Maryhill	Constituency	2026	
Jackie Dunbar	Aberdeen Donside	Constituency	2021	
Jim Eadie	Edinburgh Southern	Constituency	2011	2016
Dorothy-Grace Elder	Glasgow	Region	1999	2002 (Note: Dorothy-Grace Elder resigned from the SNP in May 2002, and sat as an independent MSP until the end of her term in 2003.)
Annabelle Ewing	Mid Scotland and Fife	Region	2011	2016
Annabelle Ewing	Cowdenbeath	Constituency	2016	2026
Fergus Ewing	Inverness East, Nairn and Lochaber	Constituency	1999	2011
Fergus Ewing	Inverness and Nairn	Constituency	2011	2025 (Note: Fergus Ewing resigned from the SNP in May 2025, and sat as an independent MSP until the end of his term in 2026.)
Margaret Ewing	Moray	Constituency	1999	2006 (Note: Margaret Ewing died in office in 2006, triggering a by-election which was won by the SNP candidate Richard Lochhead.)
Winnie Ewing	Highlands and Islands	Constituency	1999	2003
Linda Fabiani	Central Scotland	Region	1999	2011
Linda Fabiani	East Kilbride	Constituency	2011	2021
Jim Fairlie	Perthshire South and Kinross-shire	Constituency	2021	
John Finnie	Highlands and Islands	Region	2011	2012 (Note: John Finnie resigned from the SNP on 23 October 2012, and sat as an independent MSP until the 2016 election. He joined the Scottish Greens in 2014, but did not join Green group of MSPs until he was re-elected in 2016 a Green candidate.)
Joe FitzPatrick	Dundee West	Constituency	2007	2011
Joe FitzPatrick	Dundee City West	Constituency	2011	2026
Stephen Flynn	Aberdeen Deeside and North Kincardine	Constituency	2026	
Kate Forbes	Skye, Lochaber and Badenoch	Constituency	2016	2026
Jeane Freeman	Carrick, Cumnock and Doon Valley	Constituency	2016	2021
Stephen Gethins	Dundee City East	Constituency	2026	
Zen Ghani	Glasgow Cathcart and Pollok	Constituency	2026	
Kenneth Gibson	Glasgow	Region	1999	2003
Kenneth Gibson	Cunninghame North	Constituency	2007	2026 (Note: In 2026, Kenneth Gibson suspended his membership of the SNP to serve as Presiding Officer of the Scottish Parliament.)
Patricia Gibson	Cunninghame South	Constituency	2026	
Rob Gibson	Highlands and Islands	Region	2003	2011
Jenny Gilruth	Mid Fife and Glenrothes	Constituency	2016	
Hannah Mary Goodlad	Shetland Islands	Constituency	2026	
Mairi Gougeon	Angus North and Mearns	Constituency	2016	2026
Christine Grahame	South of Scotland	Region	1999	2011
Christine Grahame	Midlothian South, Tweeddale and Lauderdale	Constituency	2011	2026
Neil Gray	Airdrie and Shotts	Constituency	2021	2026
Neil Gray	Airdrie	Constituency	2026	
Katie Hagmann	Carrick, Cumnock and Doon Valley	Constituency	2026	
Duncan Hamilton	Highlands and Islands	Region	1999	2003
Emma Harper	South Scotland	Region	2016	2026
Christopher Harvie	Mid Scotland and Fife	Region	2007	2011
Clare Haughey	Rutherglen	Constituency	2016	2026
Clare Haughey	Rutherglen and Cambuslang	Constituency	2026	
Jamie Hepburn	Central Scotland	Region	2007	2011
Jamie Hepburn	Cumbernauld and Kilsyth	Constituency	2011	
Fiona Hyslop	Lothians	Region	1999	2011
Fiona Hyslop	Linlithgow	Constituency	2011	2026
Adam Ingram	South of Scotland	Region	1999	2016
Alex Kerr	Hamilton, Larkhall and Stonehouse	Constituency	2026	
Calum Kerr	Midlothian South, Tweeddale and Lauderdale	Constituency	2026	
Colin Keir	Edinburgh Western	Constituency	2011	2016
Bill Kidd	Glasgow	Region	2007	2011
Bill Kidd	Glasgow Anniesland	Constituency	2011	2026
Simita Kumar	Edinburgh South Western	Constituency	2026	
David Linden	Glasgow Baillieston and Shettleston	Constituency	2026	
Richard Lochhead	North East Scotland	Region	1999	2006 (Note: In April 2006, Richard Lochhead resigned his additional member seat as MSP for North East Scotland, in order to successfully contest the Moray by-election caused by the death of Margaret Ewing. His regional seat was filled by Maureen Watt.)
Richard Lochhead	Moray	Constituency	2006	2026
Richard Lyle	Central Scotland	Region	2011	2016
Richard Lyle	Uddingston and Bellshill	Constituency	2016	2021
Kenny MacAskill	Lothians	Region	1999	2007
Kenny MacAskill	Edinburgh East and Musselburgh	Constituency	2007	2016
Angus MacDonald	Falirk East	Constituency	2011	2021
Gordon MacDonald	Edinburgh Pentlands	Constituency	2011	2026
Margo MacDonald	Lothians	Region	1999	2003 (Note: Margo MacDonald was expelled from the SNP on 28 January 2003. She sat as an independent MSP for the remaining 4 months of the 1st Scottish Parliament, and was re-elected as an independent MSP at the next 3 elections.)
Fulton MacGregor	Coatbridge and Chryston	Constituency	2016	
Derek Mackay	Renfrewshire North and West	Constituency	2011	2020 (Note: On 6 February 2020, Derek Mackay was suspended from the SNP. He sat as an independent until he stood down at the May 2021 election.)
Rona Mackay	Strathkelvin and Bearsden	Constituency	2016	2026
Mike MacKenzie	Highlands and Islands	Region	2011	2016
Ben Macpherson	Edinburgh North and Leith	Constituency	2016	2026
Ben Macpherson	Edinburgh North Eastern and Leith	Constituency	2026	
Ruth Maguire	Cunninghame South	Constituency	2016	2026
Campbell Martin	West of Scotland	Region	2003	2004 (Note: Campbell Martin was suspended from the SNP on 25 April 2004, and expelled from the party on 10 July 2004. He sat as an independent MSP until the 2007 election, when he was defeated.)
Gillian Martin	Aberdeenshire East	Constituency	2016	
Tricia Marwick	Mid Scotland and Fife	Region	1999	2007
Tricia Marwick	Central Fife	Constituency	2007	2011 (Note: In 2011, Tricia Marwick suspended her membership of the SNP to serve as Presiding Officer of the Scottish Parliament. She continued as an independent MSP until 2016.)
John Mason	Glasgow Shettleston	Constituency	2011	
Jim Mather	Highlands and Islands	Region	2003	2007
Jim Mather	Argyll and Bute	Constituency	2007	2011
Michael Matheson	Central Scotland	Region	1999	2007
Michael Matheson	Falkirk West	Constituency	2007	
Stewart Maxwell	West of Scotland	Region	2003	2016
Màiri McAllan	Clydesdale	Constituency	2021	
Joan McAlpine	South Scotland	Region	2011	2021
Mark McDonald	North East Scotland	Region	2011	2013
Mark McDonald	Aberdeen Donside	Constituency	2013	2017 (Note: In November 2017, following an investigation into misconduct, Mark McDonald resigned from the SNP. He continued to serve as an independent MSP until he stood down at the 2021 election.)
Bruce McFee	West of Scotland	Region	2003	2007
Irene McGugan	North East Scotland	Region	1999	2003
Ian McKee	Lothians	Region	2007	2011
Ivan McKee	Glasgow Provan	Constituency	2016	2026
Ivan McKee	Glasgow Easterhouse and Springburn	Constituency	2026	
Christina McKelvie	Central Scotland	Region	2007	2011
Christina McKelvie	Hamilton, Larkhall and Stonehouse	Constituency	2011	2025 (Note: Christina McKelvie died on 27 March 2025. The consequent Hamilton, Larkhall and Stonehouse by-election was won by Scottish Labour.)
Anne McLaughlin	Glasgow	Region	2009	2011
Paul McLennan	East Lothian	Constituency	2021	2026
Paul McLennan	East Lothian Coast and Lammermuirs	Constituency	2026	
Aileen McLeod	South Scotland	Region	2011	2016
Fiona McLeod	West of Scotland	Region	1999	2003
Fiona McLeod	Strathkelvin and Bearsden	Constituency	2011	2016
Stuart McMillan	West of Scotland	Region	2007	2016
Stuart McMillan	Greenock and Inverclyde	Constituency	2016	2026
Stuart McMillan	Inverclyde	Constituency	2026	
Marie McNair	Clydebank and Milngavie	Constituency	2021	
Lloyd Melville	Angus South	Constituency	2026	
Colm Merrick	Glasgow Anniesland	Constituency	2026	
Jack Middleton	Aberdeen Central	Constituency	2026	
Jenni Minto	Argyll and Bute	Constituency	2021	
Laura Mitchell	Moray	Constituency	2026	
Alasdair Morgan	Galloway and Upper Nithsdale	Constituency	1999	2007
Alasdair Morgan	South of Scotland	Region	2007	2011
Alex Neil	Central Scotland	Region	1999	2011
Alex Neil	Airdrie and Shotts	Constituency	2011	2021
Audrey Nicoll	Aberdeen South and North Kincardine	Constituency	2021	2026
Kirsten Oswald	Eastwood	Constituency	2026	
Gil Paterson	Central Scotland	Region	1999	2003
Gil Paterson	West of Scotland	Region	2007	2011
Gil Paterson	Clydebank and Milngavie	Constituency	2011	2021
Lloyd Quinan	West of Scotland	Region	1999	2003
Ash Regan	Edinburgh Eastern	Constituency	2016	2023 (Note: Ash Regan resigned from the SNP in 2023. She initially sat as an Alba Party MSP until 2025 and then an independent MSP until the 2026 election.)
George Reid (Note: George Reid served as Presiding Officer of the Scottish Parliament from 2003 to 2007. As is customary, he suspended his SNP party membership for that period.)	Mid Scotland and Fife	Region	1999	2003
Angus Robertson	Edinburgh Central	Constituency	2021	2026
Dennis Robertson	Aberdeenshire West	Constituency	2011	2016
Shona Robison	North East Scotland	Region	1999	2003
Shona Robison	Dundee East	Constituency	2003	2011
Shona Robison	Dundee City East	Constituency	2011	2026
Emma Roddick	Highlands and Islands	Region	2021	2026
Emma Roddick	Inverness and Nairn	Constituency	2026	
Gail Ross	Caithness, Sutherland and Ross	Constituency	2016	2021
Michael Russell	South of Scotland	Region	1999	2003
Michael Russell	South of Scotland	Region	2007	2011
Michael Russell	Argyll and Bute	Constituency	2011	2021
Alex Salmond	Banff and Buchan	Constituency	1999	2001 (Note: Alex Salmond resigned from the Scottish Parliament on 14 May 2001, to lead the SNP group in the British House of Commons. The resulting Banff and Buchan by-election was won by the SNP's Stewart Stevenson.)
Alex Salmond	Gordon	Constituency	2007	2011
Alex Salmond	Aberdeenshire East	Constituency	2011	2016
Alyn Smith	Stirling	Constituency	2026	
Shirley-Anne Somerville	Lothians	Region	2007 (Note: Stefan Tymkewycz was elected for the Lothians regions at the May 2007 election. He resigned his seat in August 2007, and was succeeded as MSP by Shirley-Anne Somerville, who was the next-placed candidate on the SNP Lothians list.)	2011
Shirley-Anne Somerville	Dunfermline	Constituency	2016	
Pauline Stafford	Bathgate	Constituency	2026	
Collette Stevenson	East Kilbride	Constituency	2021	
Stewart Stevenson	Banff and Buchan	Constituency	2001	2011
Stewart Stevenson	Banffshire and Buchan Coast	Constituency	2011	2021
Kaukab Stewart	Glasgow Kelvin	Constituency	2021	2026
Kevin Stewart	Aberdeen Central	Constituency	2011	2026
Nicola Sturgeon	Glasgow	Region	1999	2007
Nicola Sturgeon	Glasgow Govan	Constituency	2007	2011
Nicola Sturgeon	Glasgow Southside	Constituency	2011	2026
John Swinney	North Tayside	Constituency	1999	2011
John Swinney	Perthshire North	Constituency	2011	
Alison Thewliss	Glasgow Central	Constituency	2026	
Dave Thompson	Highlands and Islands	Region	2007	2011
Dave Thompson	Skye, Lochaber and Badenoch	Constituency	2011	2016
Michelle Thomson	Falkirk East	Constituency	2021	2026
Maree Todd	Highlands and Islands	Region	2016	2021
Maree Todd	Caithness, Sutherland and Ross	Constituency	2021	2026
Maree Todd	Highlands and Islands	Region	2026	
David Torrance	Kirkcaldy	Constituency	2016	
Evelyn Tweed	Stirling	Constituency	2021	2026
Stefan Tymkewycz	Lothians	Region	2007	2007
Kay Ullrich	West of Scotland	Region	1999	2003
Jean Urquhart	Highlands and Islands	Region	2011	2012 (Note: Jean Urquhart resigned from the SNP on 23 October 2012. She sat as an independent until she stood down at the 2016 Scottish Parliament election.)
Bill Walker	Dunfermline	Constituency	2011	2012 (Note: Bill Walker was suspended from the SNP on 4 March 2012, and thereafter sat as an independent. He was expelled from the SNP on 8 April 2012, and resigned his seat on 7 September 2013 after being convicted on 24 charges. The resulting Dunfermline by-election was won by the Labour candidate Cara Hilton.)
Maureen Watt	North East Scotland	Region	2006	2011
Maureen Watt	Aberdeen South and North Kincardine	Constituency	2011	2021
Andrew Welsh	Angus	Constituency	1999	2011
Paul Wheelhouse	South Scotland	Region	2011	2021
Elena Whitham	Carrick, Cumnock and Doon Valley	Constituency	2021	2026
Sandra White	Glasgow	Region	1999	2011
Sandra White	Glasgow Kelvin	Constituency	2011	2021
Andrew Wilson	Central Scotland	Region	1999	2003
Bill Wilson	West of Scotland	Region	2007	2011
John Wilson	Central Scotland	Region	2007	2014 (Note: In 2014, John Wilson resigned from the SNP. He sat as an independent MSP until the 2016 election.)
Humza Yousaf	Glasgow	Region	2011	2016
Humza Yousaf	Glasgow Pollok	Constituency	2016	2026
