= List of independent members of the Scottish Parliament =

This is a list of independent MSPs. It includes all members of the Scottish Parliament (MSPs) who sat as independent politicians in the Scottish Parliament.

As of May 2021, only three people have ever been elected to the Scottish Parliament as independent candidates. Dennis Canavan and Jean Turner were independents throughout their time in the Parliament. Margo MacDonald was elected in 1999 as a Scottish National Party (SNP) candidate, but sat as an independent after her expulsion in early 2003, and was re-elected three times as an independent candidate.

The other nine MSPs who sat as independents did so after leaving the party for which they had been elected. Some resigned from their party, and others were suspended or expelled. Margo MacDonald was the only former party MSP to win re-election as an independent, but John Finnie was re-elected in 2016 as a Scottish Greens candidate.

== List of MSPs ==
Name	Constituency or region	Type	Party when first elected	Start year (as independent)	End year (as independent)	Notes
Jeremy Balfour	Lothian	Region	Conservative	2025	2026	Defeated
Amanda Bland	Central Scotland and Lothians West	Region	Reform UK	2026		
Dennis Canavan	Falkirk West	Constituency	Independent	1999	2007	Retired
Dorothy-Grace Elder	Glasgow	Region	Scottish National Party	2002	2003	Retired
Fergus Ewing	Inverness and Nairn	Constituency	Scottish National Party	2025	2026	Defeated
John Finnie	Highlands and Islands	Region	Scottish National Party	2012 (Note: John Finnie was elected at the 2011 Scottish Parliament election as a Scottish National Party (SNP) candidate. He resigned from the SNP on 23 October 2012, and sat as an independent MSP until the 2016 election. He joined the Scottish Greens in 2014, but did not join Green group of MSPs until he was re-elected in 2016 a Green candidate.)	2016	Re-elected in 2016 for Greens
Margo MacDonald	Lothians	Region	Scottish National Party	2003	2011	Constituency abolished
Margo MacDonald	Lothian	Region	Independent	2011	2014	Died
Derek Mackay	Renfrewshire North and West	Constituency	Scottish National Party	2020	2021	Retired
Campbell Martin	West of Scotland	Region	Scottish National Party	2004	2007	Defeated
Mark McDonald	Aberdeen Donside	Constituency	Scottish National Party	2018	2021	Retired
Brian Monteith	Mid Scotland and Fife	Region	Conservative	2005	2007	Retired
Ash Regan	Edinburgh Eastern	Constituency	Scottish National Party	2025	2026	Defeated
Jean Turner	Strathkelvin and Bearsden	Constituency	Independent	2003	2007	Defeated
Jean Urquhart	Highlands and Islands	Region	Scottish National Party	2012 (Note: Jean Urquhart was elected at the 2011 Scottish Parliament election as a Scottish National Party (SNP) candidate. She resigned from the SNP on 23 October 2012, and sat as an independent MSP until she retired at the * 2016 election)	2016	Retired
Bill Walker	Dunfermline	Constituency	Scottish National Party	2012	2013	Resigned
Andy Wightman	Lothian	Region	Green	2020	2021	Defeated
John Wilson	Central Scotland	Region	Scottish National Party	2014	2016	Defeated
