= Dunfermline and Dollar =

UK Parliament constituency (since 2024)

- County constituency for the House of Commons
- Interactive map of boundaries from 2024
- Boundary of Dunfermline and Dollar in Scotland
- Subdivisions of Scotland: Clackmannanshire; Fife
- Electorate: 70,725 (March 2020)
- Major settlements: Dunfermline, Dollar, Kincardine, Rosyth

Current constituency
- Created: 2024
- Member of Parliament: Graeme Downie (Scottish Labour)
- Seats: One
- Created from: Dunfermline and West Fife, Kirkcaldy and Cowdenbeath & Ochil and South Perthshire

Dunfermline and Dollar is a constituency of the House of Commons in the UK Parliament. Created as a result of the 2023 review of Westminster constituencies, it was first contested at the 2024 general election, since when it has been represented by Graeme Downie of Scottish Labour.

== Boundaries ==
The constituency comprises the following:

- The Fife Council wards of Dunfermline Central, Dunfermline North (except Kingseat), Dunfermline South, Rosyth, and West Fife and Coastal Villages.
- Part of the Clackmannanshire Council ward of Clackmannanshire East (area north of the A907).

The bulk of the constituency covers the area of the abolished Dunfermline and West Fife constituency, except eastern parts including Inverkeithing and Crossgates. It also includes the town of Dollar in Clackmannanshire, previously part of the abolished Ochil and South Perthshire constituency.

== Election results ==
=== Elections in the 2020s ===
2024 general election: Dunfermline and Dollar
Party	Candidate	Votes	%	±%
Labour	Graeme Downie	20,336	45.7	+22.1
SNP	Naz Anis Miah	12,095	27.2	−17.1
Conservative	Thomas Heald	3,297	7.4	−14.1
Liberal Democrats	Lauren Buchanan-Quigley	3,181	7.1	−1.3
Reform UK	Udo van den Brock	2,887	6.5	N/A
Green	Ryan Blackadder	2,078	4.7	+2.5
Independent	Graham Hadley	324	0.7	N/A
Scottish Family	Danny Smith	251	0.6	N/A
Independent	George Morton	88	0.2	N/A
Rejected ballots		140		
Majority		8,241	18.5	N/A
Turnout		44,537	61.2	−7.5
Registered electors		72,824		
Labour gain from SNP		Swing	+18.5	

=== Elections in the 2010s ===
2019 notional result (Note: Estimate of the 2019 general election result as if the revised boundaries recommended under the 2023 boundary review were in place)
Party	Vote	%
SNP	21,536	44.3
Labour	11,463	23.6
Conservative	10,429	21.5
Liberal Democrats	4,105	8.4
Scottish Greens	1,085	2.2
Brexit Party	1	0.0
Majority	10,073	20.7
Turnout	48,619	68.7
Electorate	70,725	
