= Dunfermline by-election =

The Dunfermline by-election may refer to:

- 2006 Dunfermline and West Fife by-election, for the UK Parliament constituency
- 2013 Dunfermline by-election, for the Scottish Parliament constituency
