= Opinion polling for the 2016 Scottish Parliament election =

The 2016 Scottish Parliament election was held on Thursday 5 May 2016 to elect 129 members to the Scottish Parliament. It was the fifth general election since the parliament was re-established in 1999.

== Polling data ==
=== Graphical summary ===
The constituency vote is shown as semi-transparent lines, while the regional vote is shown in full lines.

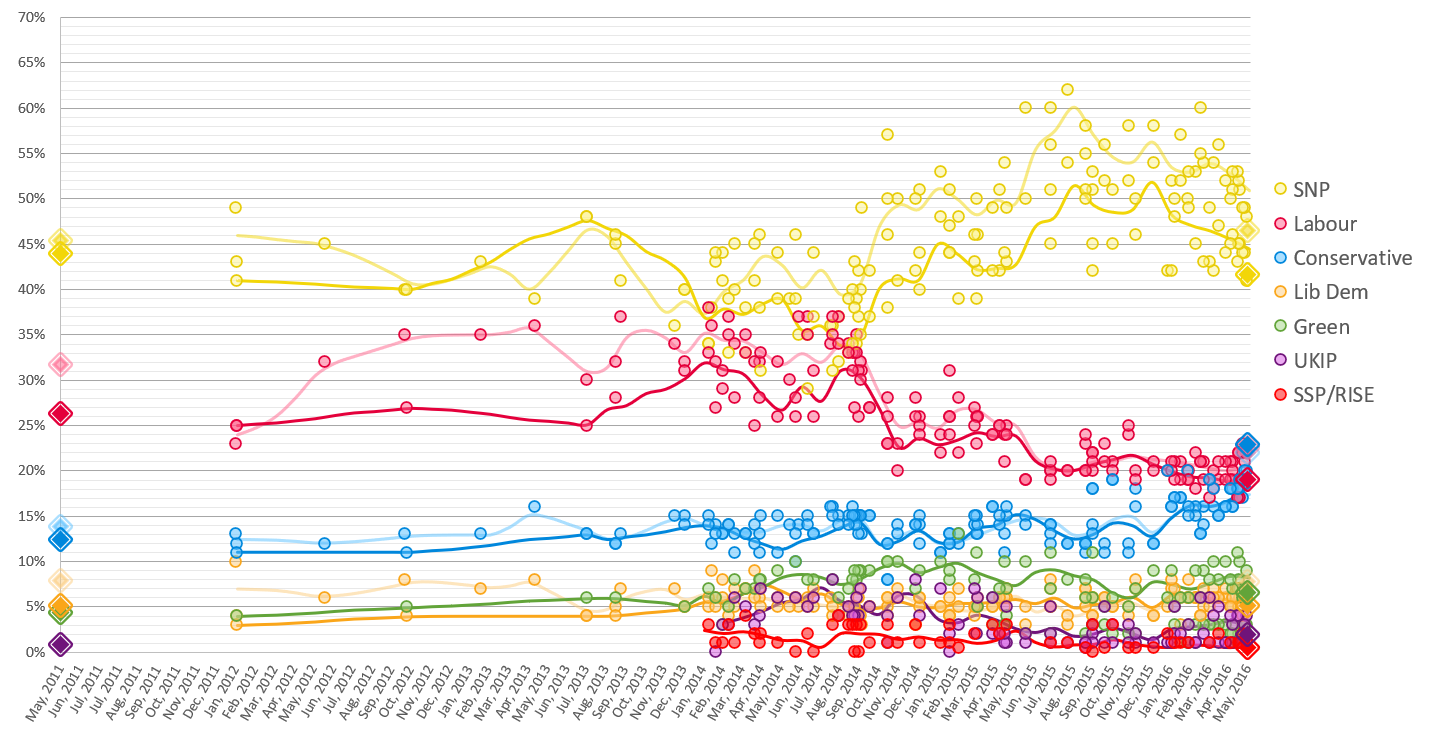
Average 30 day trend line of poll results for the 2016 Scottish Parliament election. Results from 29 January 2012 to 4 May 2016

=== Constituency Vote (FPTP) ===
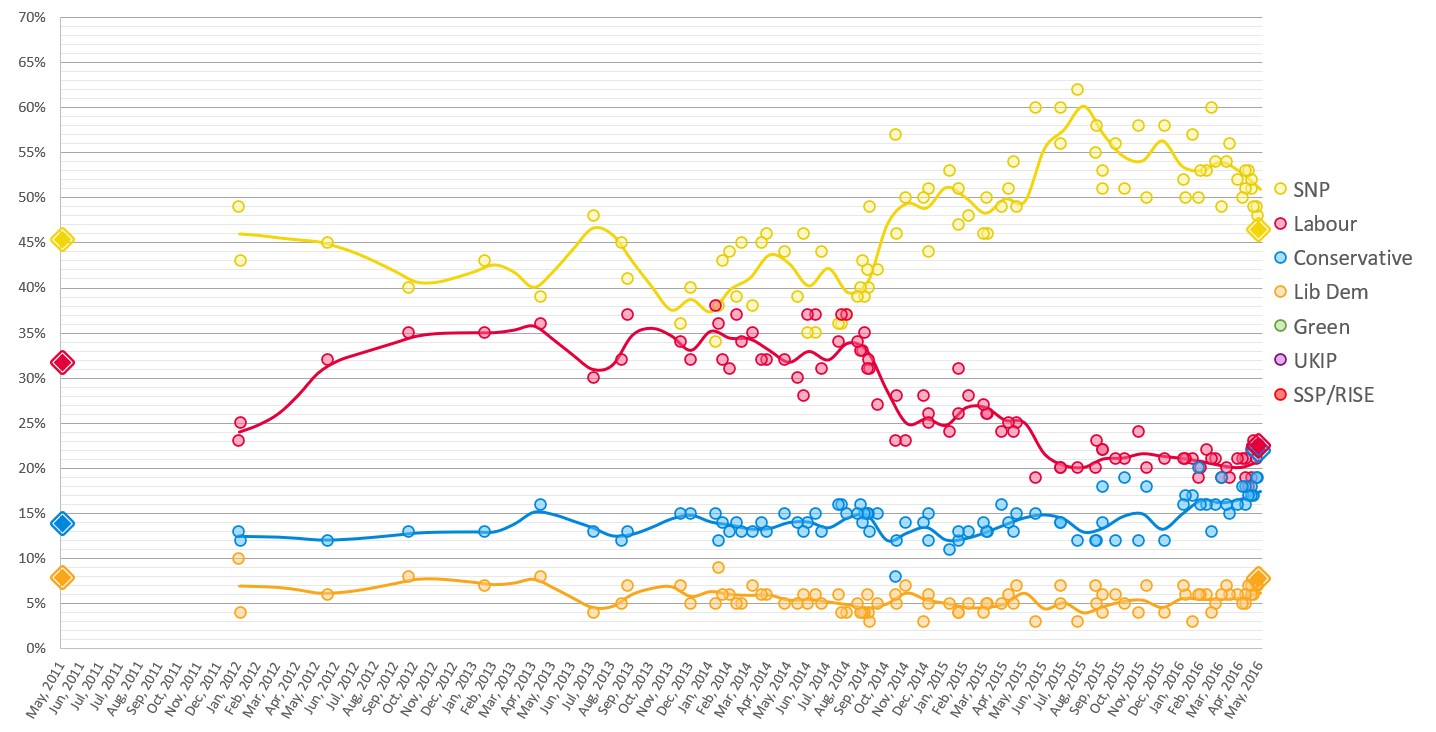

==== 2016 ====
Date(s) conducted	Polling organisation/client	Sample size	SNP	Lab	Con	Lib Dem	Others	Lead
5 May	2016 Scottish Parliament election	2,279,153	46.5%	22.6%	22.0%	7.8%	1.1%	23.9%
2–4 May	YouGov/The Times	1,445	48%	22%	19%	7%	4%	26%
1–2 May	Survation/Daily Record	1,024	49%	21%	19%	7%	5%	28%
1 May	BBC Scotland debate between Davidson, Dugdale, Harvie, Rennie and Sturgeon.							
23–28 Apr	Panelbase/Sunday Times	1,074	49%	23%	17%	6%	4%	26%
18–25 Apr	Ipsos MORI/STV	1,015	51%	19%	18%	6%	6%	32%
1–24 Apr	TNS	1,035	52%	22%	17%	7%	3%	30%
15–20 Apr	Survation/Daily Record	1,005	53%	18%	17%	7%	5%	35%
11–15 Apr	BMG Research/Herald	1,012	53%	21%	16%	6%	3%	32%
6–15 Apr	Panelbase/Sunday Times	1,021	51%	19%	18%	5%	7%	32%
7–11 Apr	YouGov/The Times	1,012	50%	21%	18%	5%	6%	29%
23 Mar–3 Apr	Survation/Unison Scotland	1,003	52%	21%	16%	6%	4%	31%
29 Mar	STV debate between Davidson, Dugdale, Harvie, Rennie and Sturgeon.							
24 Mar	BBC Scotland debate between Coburn, Davidson, Dugdale, Harvie, Rennie and Sturgeon.							
2–22 Mar	TNS	1,013	56%	19%	15%	6%	3%	37%
10–17 Mar	Survation/Daily Record	1,051	54%	20%	16%	7%	4%	34%
7–9 Mar	YouGov/The Times	1,070	49%	19%	19%	6%	7%	30%
25–29 Feb	Survation/Daily Mail	1,022	54%	21%	16%	5%	4%	33%
3–24 Feb	TNS	1,036	60%	21%	13%	4%	2%	39%
11–16 Feb	Survation/Daily Record	1,006	53%	22%	16%	6%	3%	31%
1–7 Feb	Ipsos MORI/STV	1,000	53%	20%	16%	6%	5%	33%
1–4 Feb	YouGov/The Times	1,022	50%	19%	20%	6%	5%	30%
6–25 Jan	TNS	1,016	57%	21%	17%	3%	2%	36%
8–14 Jan	Panelbase/Sunday Times	1,053	50%	21%	17%	6%	5%	29%
8–12 Jan	Survation/Daily Record	1,029	52%	21%	16%	7%	4%	31%

==== 2015 ====
Date(s) conducted	Polling organisation/client	Sample size	SNP	Lab	Con	Lib Dem	Others	Lead
16 Nov–14 Dec	TNS	1,035	58%	21%	12%	4%	5%	37%
9–16 Nov	Ipsos MORI/STV	1,029	50%	20%	18%	7%	5%	30%
16 Oct–4 Nov	TNS	1,034	58%	24%	12%	4%	2%	34%
9–13 Oct	YouGov/The Times	1,026	51%	21%	19%	5%	5%	30%
9–30 Sep	TNS	1,037	56%	21%	12%	6%	5%	35%
12 Sep	Jeremy Corbyn becomes leader of the Labour Party							
7–10 Sep	Survation/The Scottish Daily Mail	1,010	53%	22%	14%	6%	5%	31%
7–10 Sep	YouGov/The Times	1,110	51%	22%	18%	4%	5%	29%
12 Aug–1 Sep	TNS	1,023	58%	23%	12%	5%	2%	35%
24–30 Aug	Ipsos MORI/STV	1,002	55%	20%	12%	7%	6%	35%
15 Aug	Kezia Dugdale becomes leader of Scottish Labour							
10 July–3 Aug	TNS	1,029	62%	20%	12%	3%	2%	42%
19 June–8 July	TNS	1,056	60%	20%	14%	5%	2%	40%
3–7 July	Survation/Scottish Daily Mail	1,084	56%	20%	14%	7%	4%	36%
13–30 May	TNS	1,031	60%	19%	15%	3%	3%	41%
16 May	Jim Murphy resigns as leader of Scottish Labour							
7 May	2015 United Kingdom general election							
29 Apr–1 May	YouGov/The Times	1,162	49%	25%	15%	7%	4%	24%
22–27 Apr	Survation/Daily Record	1,015	54%	24%	13%	5%	4%	30%
16–20 Apr	YouGov/The Times	1,111	51%	25%	14%	6%	4%	26%
8–9 Apr	YouGov/The Times	1,056	49%	24%	16%	5%	5%	25%
13–19 Mar	ICM/Guardian	1,002	46%	26%	13%	5%	9%	20%
12–17 Mar	Survation/Daily Record	1,027	50%	26%	13%	5%	6%	24%
10–12 Mar	YouGov/The Times	1,049	46%	27%	14%	4%	5%	19%
12–17 Feb	Survation/Daily Record	1,011	48%	28%	13%	5%	7%	20%
29 Jan–2 Feb	YouGov/The Times	1,001	51%	26%	12%	4%	7%	25%
14 Jan–2 Feb	TNS	1,006	47%	31%	13%	4%	5%	16%
12–19 Jan	Ipsos MORI/STV	1,001	53%	24%	11%	5%	7%	29%

==== 2014 ====
Date(s) conducted	Polling organisation/client	Sample size	SNP	Lab	Con	Lib Dem	Others	Lead
16–18 Dec	ICM/Guardian	1,004	44%	26%	12%	6%	11%	18%
15–18 Dec	Survation/Daily Record	1,000	51%	25%	15%	5%	5%	26%
13 Dec	Jim Murphy becomes leader of Scottish Labour							
9–11 Dec	YouGov/The Sun	1,081	50%	28%	14%	3%	5%	22%
27 Nov	Release of Smith Commission Report							
20 Nov	Nicola Sturgeon becomes First Minister of Scotland							
16 Nov	Nicola Sturgeon becomes leader of the SNP							
6–13 Nov	Survation/Daily Record	1,001	50%	23%	14%	7%	6%	27%
27–30 Oct	YouGov/Times	1,078	46%	28%	12%	5%	9%	18%
22–29 Oct	Ipsos MORI	1,026	57%	23%	8%	6%	5%	34%
24 Oct	Johann Lamont resigns as leader of the Scottish Labour Party, triggering a leadership election							
12 Sep – 1 Oct	Panelbase/Scottish National Party	1,049	42%	27%	15%	5%	10%	15%
19 Sep	Survation/Daily Mail	871	49%	31%	13%	3%	1%	18%
19 Sep	First Minister Alex Salmond announces his resignation, triggering a leadership election							
18 Sep	Scottish independence referendum							
15–17 Sep	YouGov/The Sun	3,237	40%	32%	15%	4%	9%	8%
12–16 Sep	Survation/Daily Mail	1,000	42%	31%	15%	6%	6%	11%
9–11 Sep	YouGov/The Times/The Sun	1,268	39%	35%	15%	4%	8%	4%
5–9 Sep	Survation/Daily Record	1,000	43%	33%	14%	4%	5%	10%
2–5 Sep	YouGov/Sunday Times	1,084	40%	33%	16%	4%	8%	7%
28 Aug – 1 Sep	YouGov/The Times/The Sun	1,063	39%	34%	15%	5%	7%	5%
12–15 Aug	YouGov/The Times	1,085	37%	37%	15%	4%	7%	Tied
4–7 Aug	YouGov/The Sun	1,142	36%	37%	16%	4%	7%	1%
28 Jul – 3 Aug	Ipsos MORI/STV	1,006	36%	34%	16%	6%	8%	2%
4–8 Jul	Survation/Daily Record	1,013	44%	31%	13%	5%	7%	13%
25–29 Jun	YouGov/The Times	1,206	35%	37%	15%	6%	8%	2%
12–16 Jun	YouGov/The Sun	1,039	35%	37%	14%	5%	9%	2%
8–10 Jun	Survation/Daily Record	1,004	46%	28%	13%	6%	6%	18%
16 May – 1 Jun	Ipsos MORI/STV	1,003	39%	30%	14%	5%	12%	9%
22 May	2014 European Parliament election							
9–12 May	Survation/Daily Record	1,003	44%	32%	15%	5%	4%	12%
11–15 Apr	Survation/Sunday Post	1,002	46%	32%	13%	6%	4%	14%
4–7 Apr	Survation/Daily Record	1,001	45%	32%	14%	6%	4%	13%
20–24 Mar	YouGov/The Times	1,002	38%	35%	13%	7%	7%	3%
6–7 Mar	Survation/Daily Record/Better Nation	1,002	45%	34%	13%	5%	4%	11%
24–28 Feb	YouGov	1,257	39%	37%	14%	5%	5%	2%
17–18 Feb	Survation/Daily Mail	1,005	44%	31%	13%	6%	6%	13%
29 Jan – 6 Feb	Panelbase/Sunday Times	1,012	43%	32%	14%	6%	6%	11%
29–31 Jan	Survation/Mail on Sunday	1,010	38%	36%	12%	9%	5%	2%
21–27 Jan	YouGov	1,192	34%	38%	15%	5%	7%	4%
23 Jan	2014 Cowdenbeath by-election							

==== 2013 ====
Date(s) conducted	Polling organisation/client	Sample size	SNP	Lab	Con	Lib Dem	Others	Lead
13–20 Dec	Panelbase/Scottish National Party	1,012	40%	32%	15%	5%	8%	8%
29 Nov – 5 Dec	Ipsos MORI/STV News	1,006	36%	34%	15%	7%	7%	2%
24 October	2013 Dunfermline by-election							
9–15 Sep	Ipsos MORI	1,000	41%	37%	13%	7%	2%	4%
30 Aug – 5 Sep	Panelbase/Sunday Times	1,002	45%	32%	12%	5%	6%	13%
17–24 Jul	Panelbase/Sunday Times	1,001	48%	30%	13%	4%	5%	18%
20 June	2013 Aberdeen Donside by-election							
29 Apr – 5 May	Ipsos MORI/The Times	1,001	39%	36%	16%	8%	1%	2%
4–9 Feb	Ipsos MORI/The Times	1,003	43%	35%	13%	7%	2%	8%

==== 2012 ====
Date(s) conducted	Polling organisation/client	Sample size	SNP	Lab	Con	Lib Dem	Others	Lead
8–15 Oct	Ipsos MORI/The Times	1,003	40%	35%	13%	8%	4%	5%
7–13 Jun	Ipsos MORI	1,003	45%	32%	12%	6%	5%	13%
3 May	2012 Scottish local elections							
27–29 Jan	Ipsos MORI	1,005	49%	23%	13%	10%	5%	26%
26 Jan – 1 Feb	Panelbase/Sunday Times	1,008	43%	25%	12%	4%	3%	18%

==== 2011 ====
Date(s) conducted	Polling organisation/client	Sample size	SNP	Lab	Con	Lib Dem	Others	Lead
5 May	2011 Scottish Parliament election	1,989,222	45.4%	31.7%	13.9%	7.9%	1.1%	13.7%

=== Regional Vote (AMS) ===
==== Graphical summary ====
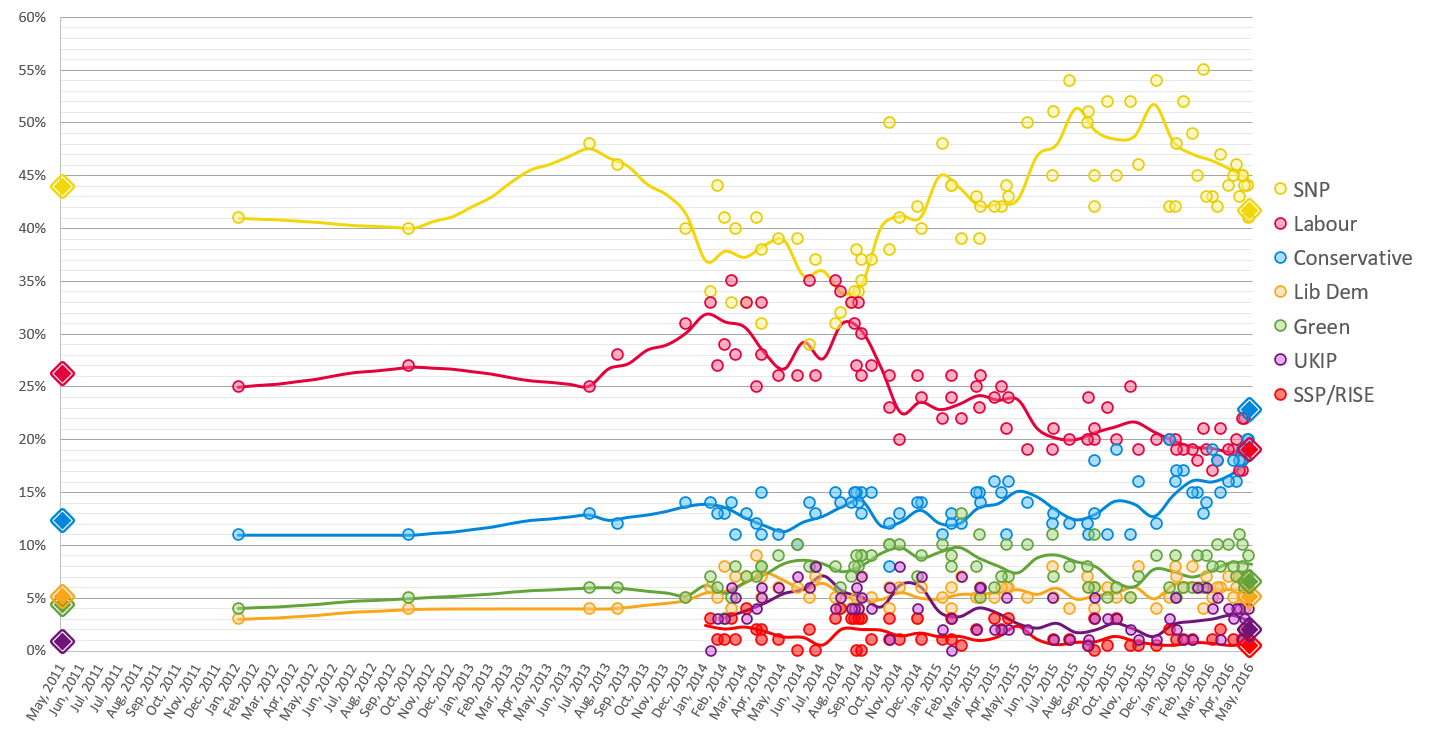

==== 2016 ====
Date(s) conducted	Polling organisation/client	Sample size	SNP	Lab	Con	Green	Lib Dem	UKIP	RISE	Others	Lead
5 May	2016 Scottish Parliament election	2,285,752	41.7%	19.1%	22.9%	6.6%	5.2%	2.0%	0.5%	2.0%	18.8%
2–4 May	YouGov/The Times	1,445	41%	19%	20%	9%	6%	4%	1%	1%	21%
1–2 May	Survation/Daily Record	1,024	44%	19%	20%	7%	6%	2%	—N/a	2%	24%
1 May	BBC Scotland debate between Davidson, Dugdale, Harvie, Rennie and Sturgeon.										
23–28 Apr	Panelbase/Sunday Times	1,074	44%	22%	19%	6%	4%	3%	2%	<1%	22%
18–25 Apr	Ipsos MORI/STV	1,015	45%	17%	19%	10%	7%	1%	<1%	<1%	26%
1–24 Apr	TNS	1,035	45%	22%	18%	8%	5%	<1%	1%	<1%	23%
15–20 Apr	Survation/Daily Record	1,005	43%	17%	18%	11%	7%	4%	—N/a	2%	25%
11–15 Apr	BMG Research/Herald	1,012	46%	20%	16%	7%	6%	4%	—N/a	0%	26%
6–15 Apr	Panelbase/Sunday Times	1,021	47%	18%	19%	8%	4%	3%	1%	<1%	28%
7–11 Apr	YouGov/The Times	1,012	45%	19%	18%	8%	5%	3%	1%	1%	26%
23 Mar–3 Apr	Survation/Unison Scotland	1,003	44%	19%	16%	10%	7%	4%	—N/a	1%	25%
29 Mar	STV debate between Davidson, Dugdale, Harvie, Rennie and Sturgeon.										
24 Mar	BBC Scotland debate between Coburn, Davidson, Dugdale, Harvie, Rennie and Sturgeon.										
2–22 Mar	TNS	1,013	47%	21%	15%	8%	6%	1%	2%	–	26%
10–17 Mar	Survation/Daily Record	1,051	42%	18%	18%	10%	6%	5%	—N/a	1%	24%
7–9 Mar	YouGov/The Times	1,070	43%	17%	19%	8%	5%	4%	1%	1%	24%
25–29 Feb	Survation/Daily Mail	1,022	43%	19%	14%	9%	7%	6%	–	1%	24%
3–24 Feb	TNS	1,036	55%	21%	13%	6%	4%	–	–	–	34%
11–16 Feb	Survation/Daily Record	1,006	45%	18%	15%	9%	6%	6%	–	1%	27%
1–7 Feb	Ipsos MORI/STV	1,000	49%	19%	15%	6%	8%	1%	<1%	2%	30%
1–4 Feb	YouGov/The Times	1,022	42%	20%	20%	6%	5%	3%	2%	1%	22%
6–25 Jan	TNS	1,016	52%	19%	17%	6%	6%	<1%	<1%	1%	33%
8–14 Jan	Panelbase/Sunday Times	1,053	48%	19%	17%	5%	7%	2%	1%	1%	29%
8–12 Jan	Survation/Daily Record	1,029	42%	20%	16%	9%	8%	5%	–	<1%	22%

==== 2015 ====
Date(s) conducted	Polling organisation/client	Sample size	SNP	Lab	Con	Green	Lib Dem	UKIP	SSP/ RISE	Others	Lead
16 Nov-14 Dec	TNS	1,035	54%	20%	12%	9%	4%	1%	<0.5%	0%	34%
9–16 Nov	Ipsos MORI/STV	1,029	46%	19%	16%	7%	8%	1%	<0.5%	1%	27%
16 Oct–4 Nov	TNS	1,034	52%	25%	11%	5%	5%	2%	<0.5%	1%	27%
9–13 Oct	YouGov/The Times	1,110	45%	20%	19%	6%	5%	3%	3%	0%	25%
9–30 Sep	TNS	1,037	52%	23%	11%	5%	6%	3%	0.5%	1%	29%
12 Sep	Jeremy Corbyn becomes leader of the Labour Party										
7–10 Sep	Survation/The Scottish Daily Mail	1,010	42%	21%	13%	11%	6%	5%	0%	1%	21%
7–10 Sep	YouGov/The Times	1,110	45%	20%	18%	6%	4%	3%	3%	1%	25%
12 Aug–1 Sep	TNS	1,023	51%	24%	11%	6%	6%	1%	<0.5%	1%	27%
24–30 Aug	Ipsos MORI/STV	1,002	50%	20%	12%	8%	7%	<0.5%	—N/a	2%	30%
15 Aug	Kezia Dugdale becomes leader of Scottish Labour										
10 Jul-3 Aug	TNS	1,029	54%	20%	12%	8%	4%	1%	1%	0%	34%
19 Jun-8 Jul	TNS	1,056	51%	21%	13%	7%	5%	1%	1%	0%	30%
3–7 Jul	Survation/Daily Mail	1,031	45%	19%	12%	11%	8%	5%	—N/a	0%	26%
13–30 May	TNS	1,031	50%	19%	14%	10%	5%	2%	—N/a	0%	31%
16 May	Jim Murphy resigns as leader of Scottish Labour										
7 May	2015 United Kingdom general election										
29 Apr-1 May	YouGov/The Times	1,162	43%	24%	16%	7%	6%	2%	3%	0%	19%
22–27 Apr	Survation/Daily Record	1,015	44%	21%	11%	10%	6%	5%	—N/a	1%	23%
16–20 Apr	YouGov/The Times	1,111	42%	25%	15%	7%	6%	2%	2%	0%	17%
8–9 Apr	YouGov/The Times	1,056	42%	24%	16%	6%	5%	2%	3%	1%	18%
13–19 Mar	Survation/Daily Record	1,002	42%	26%	14%	5%	6%	6%	—N/a	1%	16%
12–17 Mar	Survation/Daily Record	1,027	39%	23%	15%	11%	5%	6%	—N/a	2%	16%
10–12 Mar	YouGov/The Times	1,001	43%	25%	15%	8%	5%	2%	2%	0%	18%
12–17 Feb	Survation/Daily Record	1,011	39%	22%	12%	13%	7%	7%	<0.5%	1%	17%
29 Jan-2 Feb	YouGov/The Times	1,001	44%	24%	12%	8%	4%	3%	3%	1%	20%
14 Jan-2 Feb	TNS BMRB	1,006	44%	26%	13%	9%	6%	0%	1%	1%	18%
12–19 Jan	Ipsos MORI/STV	1,001	48%	22%	11%	10%	5%	2%	1%	1%	26%

==== 2014 ====
Date(s) conducted	Polling organisation/client	Sample size	SNP	Lab	Con	Green	Lib Dem	UKIP	SSP	Others	Lead
15–18 Dec	Survation/Daily Record	1,000	40%	24%	14%	9%	6%	7%	1%	1%	16%
13 Dec	Jim Murphy becomes leader of Scottish Labour										
9–11 Dec	YouGov/The Sun	1,081	42%	26%	14%	7%	3%	4%	3%	2%	16%
27 Nov	Release of Smith Commission Report										
20 Nov	Nicola Sturgeon becomes First Minister of Scotland										
16 Nov	Nicola Sturgeon becomes leader of the SNP										
6–13 Nov	Survation/Daily Record	1,001	41%	20%	13%	10%	6%	8%	1%	1%	21%
27–30 Oct	YouGov/Times	1,078	38%	26%	12%	10%	4%	6%	3%	1%	12%
22–29 Oct	Ipsos MORI	1,026	50%	23%	8%	10%	6%	1%	1%	1%	27%
24 Oct	Johann Lamont resigns as leader of the Scottish Labour Party, triggering a leadership election										
12 Sep – 1 Oct	Panelbase/Scottish National Party	1,049	37%	27%	15%	9%	5%	4%	1%		10%
19 Sep	First Minister Alex Salmond announces his resignation, triggering a leadership election										
18 Sep	2014 Scottish independence referendum										
15–17 Sep	YouGov/The Sun	3,237	35%	30%	15%	9%	3%	5%	3%	1%	5%
12–16 Sep	Survation/Daily Mail	1,000	37%	26%	13%	9%	7%	7%	0%	1%	11%
9–11 Sep	YouGov/The Times/The Sun	1,268	34%	33%	14%	8%	4%	4%	3%	1%	1%
5–9 Sep	Survation/Daily Record	1,000	38%	27%	15%	9%	5%	6%	0%	1%	11%
2–5 Sep	YouGov/The Sunday Times	1,084	34%	31%	15%	8%	4%	4%	3%	1%	3%
28 Aug – 1 Sep	YouGov/The Times/The Sun	1,063	33%	33%	14%	7%	4%	4%	3%	1%	Tied
12–15 August	YouGov/The Times	1,085	32%	34%	14%	6%	4%	5%	4%	2%	2%
4–7 August	YouGov/The Sun	1,142	31%	35%	15%	8%	5%	4%	3%	1%	4%
4–8 July	Survation/Daily Record	1,013	37%	26%	13%	8%	7%	8%	0%	1%	11%
25–29 June	YouGov/The Times	1,206	29%	35%	14%	8%	5%	6%	2%	1%	6%
12–16 June	YouGov/The Sun	1,039	31%	33%	15%	8%	5%	5%	2%	1%	2%
8–10 June	Survation/Daily Record	1,004	39%	26%	10%	10%	6%	7%	0%	1%	13%
22 June	2014 European Parliament election										
9–12 May	Survation/Daily Record	1,003	39%	26%	11%	9%	6%	6%	1%	1%	13%
11–15 Apr	Survation/Sunday Post	1,001	38%	28%	11%	8%	7%	6%	1%	1%	10%
4–7 Apr	Survation/Daily Record	1,002	41%	25%	12%	7%	9%	4%	2%		16%
20–24 Mar	YouGov/The Times	1,072	33%	33%	13%	7%	7%	3%	4%	1%	Tied
6–7 Mar	Survation/Daily Record/Better Nation	1,002	40%	28%	11%	8%	7%	5%	1%	0%	12%
24–28 Feb	YouGov	1,257	33%	35%	14%	5%	4%	6%	3%	1%	2%
17–18 Feb	Survation/Daily Mail	1,005	41%	29%	13%	3%	8%	3%	1%	2%	12%
26 Jan – 6 Feb	Panelbase/Sunday Times	1,012	44%	27%	13%	6%	5%	3%	1%		17%
21–27 Jan	YouGov	1,192	34%	33%	14%	7%	6%	0%	3%	3%	1%
23 January	2014 Cowdenbeath by-election										

==== 2013 ====
Date(s) conducted	Polling organisation/client	Sample size	SNP	Lab	Con	Green	Lib Dem	Others	Lead
13–20 Dec	Panelbase/Scottish National Party	1,012	40%	31%	14%	5%	5%	5%	9%
24 October	2013 Dunfermline by-election								
30 Aug – 5 Sep	Panelbase/Sunday Times	1,002	46%	28%	12%	6%	4%	4%	18%
17–24 Jul	Panelbase/Sunday Times	1,001	48%	25%	13%	6%	4%	4%	23%
20 June	2013 Aberdeen Donside by-election								

==== 2012 ====
Date(s) conducted	Polling organisation/client	Sample size	SNP	Lab	Con	Green	Lib Dem	Others	Lead
9–19 Oct	Panelbase/Sunday Times	972	40%	27%	11%	5%	4%	3%	13%
3 May	2012 Scottish local elections								
26 Jan – 1 Feb	Panelbase/Sunday Times	1,008	41%	25%	11%	4%	3%	1%	16%

==== 2011 ====
Date(s) conducted	Polling organisation/client	Sample size	SNP	Lab	Con	Lib Dem	Green	Others	Lead
5 May	2011 Scottish Parliament election	1,991,051	44.0%	26.3%	12.4%	5.2%	4.4%	7.7%	17.7%
