= Graeme Downie =

British politician

Graeme Downie MP
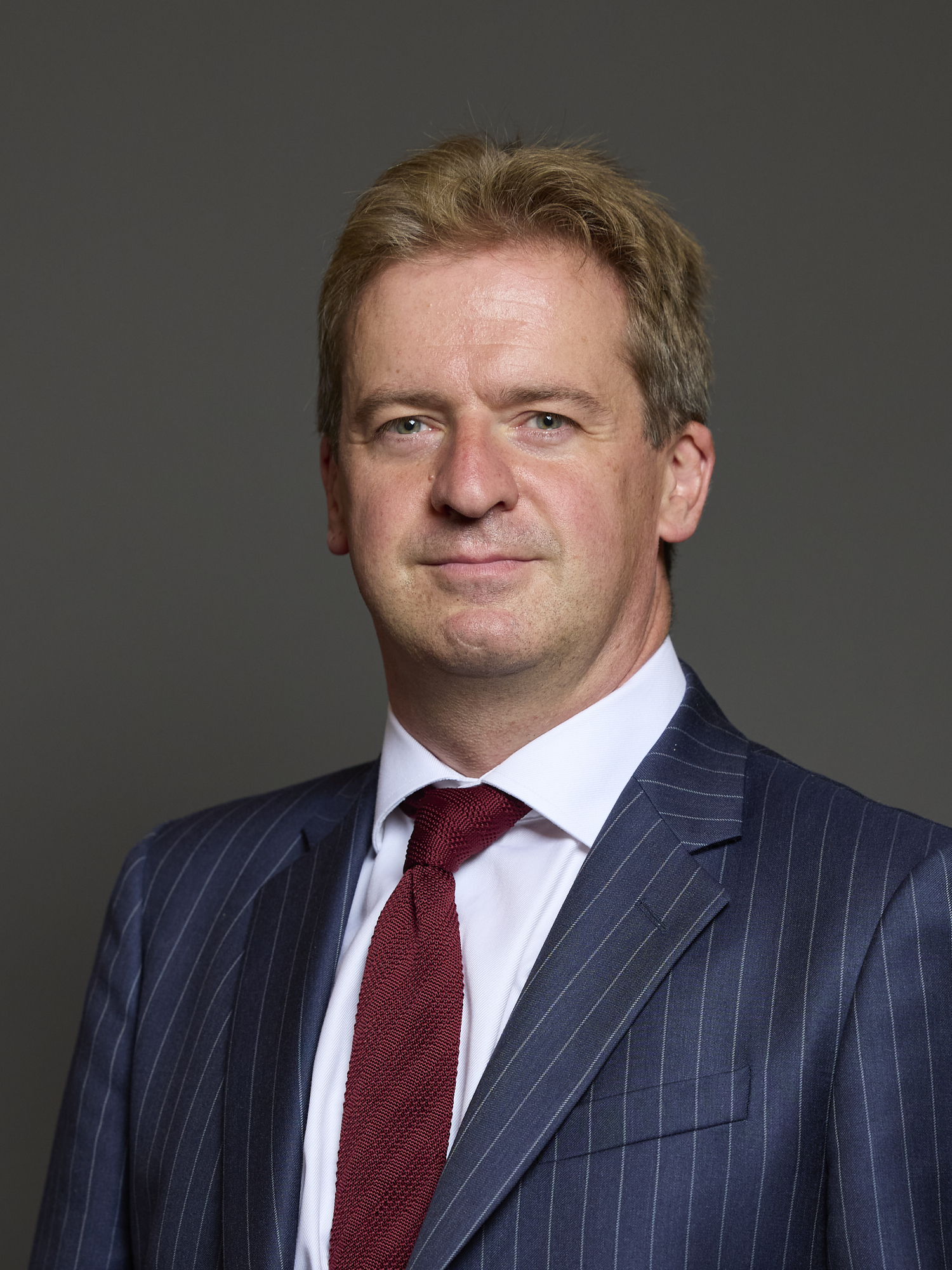
- Official portrait, 2024

Member of Parliament for Dunfermline and Dollar
- Incumbent
- Assumed office 4 July 2024
- Preceded by: Constituency Established
- Majority: 8,241 (18.4%)

Personal details
- Born: Graeme James Downie; December 1980 (age 45)
- Party: Labour
- Education: University of Stirling

Graeme James Downie (born December 1980) is a Scottish politician, he is a member of the Labour Party and has served as the Member of Parliament for Dunfermline and Dollar since 2024.

He grew up mainly in Scotland but also lived for a while in both Berlin and Warrington. He was a friend of 12 year old Tim Parry who was killed in the IRA Warrington bombings in 1993. He attended Craigmount High School and the University of Stirling, where he graduated with a BA in Politics in 2002.

== Political career ==
Downie began his political career as a Councillor for West Fife and Coastal Villages and Health Spokesperson in the Labour-led Fife Council administration. He resigned from both following his election to parliament. In September 2023, Downie was among several politicians who went on a diplomatic visit to Israel funded by Labour Friends of Israel.

=== 2024–present ===
Downie ran in the 2024 United Kingdom general election in the constituency Dunfermline and Dollar under the Labour Party. He was one of several Scottish candidates to received donations from Baronet Gordon Dalyell during the election.

In the 2024 general election, Downie flipped Dunfermline and Dollar from the Scottish National Party to the Labour party. He received 20,336 votes, 8,241 more than the next highest scoring candidate.

Following his victory he stepped down from his role as Health Spokesperson but planned to continue as a councillor. However he did not wish to be paid for the position. He announced his resignation on 4 September 2024. A by-election was held on 28 November 2024, to fill the seat.

In March 2025, Downie began a petition to have the Competition and Markets Authority investigate possible price-fixing or anti-competitive tactics with petrol prices in Dunfermline.

== Political positions ==
Downie supports assisted suicide, voting in favour of the Terminally Ill Adults (End of Life) Bill.

Downie supports the Submarine Dismantling Project (SDP) to decommission nuclear submarines that have fallen into disrepair or become obsolete. He cited the costs of maintenance, possible safety risks, and the job growth associated with decommissioning as reasons for his support.

== Personal life ==
Downie lives in Torryburn in the West Fife and Coastal Villages ward of his constituency.
