= Scottish Daily News =

Scottish newspaper published in 1975

The Scottish Daily News (SDN) was a left-of-centre daily newspaper published in Glasgow between 5 May and 8 November 1975. It was hailed as Britain's first worker-controlled, mass-circulation daily, formed as a workers' cooperative by 500 of the 1,846 journalists, photographers, engineers, and print workers who were made redundant in April 1974 by Beaverbrook Newspapers when the Scottish Daily Express closed its printing operations in Scotland and moved to Manchester.

The redundant workers, who set up a Scottish Daily News action committee, contributed £200,000 of their redundancy money to set up the newspaper, with the British government promising a loan of £1.2 million to enable them to buy the Scottish Daily Express building in Glasgow at 195 Albion Street—a replica of the Daily Express's black-glass Art Deco offices in London's Fleet Street, dubbed the "Black Lubyanka"—if the committee could raise another £275,000. Around £175,000 of this came from members of the public in shares of £25 each, and just over £100,000 from Robert Maxwell, the owner of Pergamon Press.

The newspaper, which had as its slogan "Read the people's paper and keep 500 in jobs", folded after six months with a deficit of £1.2 million, but was published for another six months by a small group of employees who, led by journalist Dorothy-Grace Elder, staged the country's one and only newspaper work-in, writing and selling the paper themselves on the streets of Glasgow, taking no salaries, and refusing to leave the Albion Street building.

== Broadsheet ==
The first 16-page edition of the newspaper rolled off the presses as a broadsheet, as the Scottish Daily Express had been, at 9:50 p.m. on 4 May 1975, under the editorship of Fred Sillito, with Andrew McCallum as news editor, and 500 employee-shareholders. The journalists, based on the third floor of the Albion Street building, agreed to take a basic £69 a week salary and the editor £150. Dorothy-Grace Elder, later an early Member of the Scottish Parliament (MSP) from 1999, became the editor of the women's section. The first issue sold out at over 300,000 copies.

Although the broadsheet format was then believed by many employees to be a mistake, as reports had shown that the Scottish public preferred the tabloid format, the action committee, now called the executive council or works council, confidently expected circulation to fall to 220,000 within three weeks as the novelty of the newspaper wore off. However, circulation dropped further and more quickly than expected, reaching 190,000 in the third week. After taking returns into account, this produced an actual sales figures of less than 180,000, which meant that financial losses had begun to occur.

According to Christopher Hird in the New Internationalist, a feasibility study conducted by Strathclyde University before the paper began publication indicated that the average daily sale needed to be 200,000 to break even, and that the venture could not work given the costs and expected sales.

After the capital costs were taken into account, Hird wrote, the company had a start-up budget of only £950,000, a relatively small amount to launch a new paper.

== Relaunch ==
By August 1975, losses were running at £30,000 a week with daily circulation down to 80,000, and it was decided to relaunch the newspaper as a tabloid, the first issue of which was published on 18 August with a print run of 240,000, priced at 5p.

Few of the workers had experience of publishing a tabloid, and by the end of August, losses were lower, running at £17,000 a week, but with circulation down to 170,000.

== Losses ==
On 15 September 1975, 300 of the workers attended an emergency meeting set up by Robert Maxwell, who accused the management of the newspaper of playing politics with the workers' jobs, in part because, he said, they were refusing to allow managers to manage and were blocking a price rise that Maxwell felt might save the newspaper The result of the meeting was that two of the managers were removed from the executive council and replaced by two of Maxwell's appointees, Dorothy-Grace Elder and Tommy Clarke.

The losses continued, made worse on 19 September when Beaverbrook began legal action to recover £59,000 the company said was still owed on the sale of the building. The litigation destroyed what was left of the newspaper's financial viability and credit was no longer available. Bills had to be paid immediately, journalists no longer had lines of credit for taxis and petrol, photographers had to pay up front for photographic supplies, and the accounts department became swamped with demands for payment from nervous creditors.

== Final days ==
During the final days of the newspaper, its content became self-obsessed, with appeals to the Scottish people to save their own newspaper The editor was forced out, and a new editor appointed, Nathan Goldberg, a communist and the newspaper's former night editor, who took over on 6 October. When asked how he felt about this, he compared himself to the captain of the Titanic, thereafter becoming known as "Nathan Iceberg".

The government refused to extend any additional loans to save the newspaper, or to give up its secured creditor status on the loan for the building, which would have meant the newspaper could have raised money using the building as collateral.

During a workers' meeting on 20 October 1975, with circulation running at 150,000 a day, the company chairman Alistair Blyth announced that a provisional liquidator, James Whitton of Coopers & Lybrand, had been appointed to take over the running of the newspaper as administrators, with the aim of saving it rather than continuing the liquidation process. Whitton's options were to sell the newspaper as a going concern, find new investors, or split up and sell the assets. The advantage of having a liquidator sanctioned by the courts on board was that the newspaper's credit was guaranteed and salaries could be paid.

The next day, 21 October, members of the executive council met Prime Minister Harold Wilson to ask again, without success, that the government's loan conditions be relaxed.

On Saturday, 1 November, the workers held a rally in at Custom House Quay attended by several hundred employees and members of the Scottish National Party (SNP), where speakers appealed to the government to save the newspaper and the 500 jobs. Those who addressed the rally included Teddy Taylor of the Conservative Party, Margo MacDonald of the SNP, Jimmy Reid of the Communist Party, and representatives of the Scottish Trades Union Congress as well as ministers of Catholic and Protestant churches.

Chairman Alister Blyth told the rally:

[A]nyone in the newspaper industry will tell you ... that it takes at least a year for a newspaper to become established, get on its feet to settle its circulation. It became clear that we were under-financed from the start ... This was aggravated, of course, by the fact that we came out with the wrong size of newspaper.

On 6 November, the liquidator announced that he would be winding up the newspaper in two days' time.

== Work-in ==
At a workers' meeting on 7 November 1975, the remaining employees, led by Dorothy-Grace Elder, decided to stage a work-in by refusing to leave the building, and by writing and selling the newspaper themselves on the streets of Glasgow, with the printing handed over to an outside commercial printer because the Albion Street presses were no longer running. A small group of employees stood outside factories and stores at five o'clock every morning shaking tin cans and asking for donations, a situation that continued for six months until, needing to earn a living, workers began to leave, putting an end to Scotland's experiment in worker-controlled news production.

Elder wrote on her Scottish National Party webpage:

For six months, we held that building – technically, illegally. The old black glass Express building was worth millions.

We were the first newspaper workers' co-operative and we worked for free for six months in the freezing and abandoned Albion Street plant, producing a rebel paper we wrote and sold ourselves on the streets.

Throughout, I dreaded the day the phone would ring to tell us the police would be sent in to re-claim the building (then part owned by the Labour government and with a council interest also).

A call came one day from the Lord Provost, Peter McCann, who was also chief magistrate.

"Oh please don't send in the police. We can't risk violence. This is a peaceful work-in," I said before he had a chance to speak. "Police? We could – but we won't," replied McCann. "Councillors wouldn't do that to Glasgow folk who are protesting peacefully. I was just phoning to say I guess your work-in must be hungry since your canteen closed. So you've all to come round to the Corporation canteen, get a cheap dinner and say I sent you if there's any bother".

== Albion Street building ==
The category-A listed building at 195 Albion Street was later used by the Glasgow Evening Times and, from July 1980, by The Glasgow Herald, whereupon it became known as the Herald building. The nine-storey building, built by Beaverbrook in 1937 and extended in 1955, was refurbished in 2004 at a cost of £25 million and turned into an apartment block housing 149 apartments.

== See also ==
- List of newspapers in Scotland

== Sources ==
- McKay, Ron & Barr, Brian. The Story of the Scottish Daily News. Canongate 1976, ISBN 0-903937-24-7
- Slattery, Jon. "May 1975: Scotland daily launched", Press Gazette, 26 May 2005
- Former SNP webpage of Dorothy-Grace Elder, cached by Google 23 January 2005, retrieved 27 March 2006.
- "The Herald Building: Flats could be front page news", Evening News, 23 November 2004
- "The Herald Building", FM Developments, retrieved 27 March 2006.
- Artist's impression of the refurbished Herald Building
- Hird, Christopher. "The crippled giants", New Internationalist, December 1981
