= Dunfermline (Scottish Parliament constituency) =

Constituency of the Scottish Parliament

- County constituency for the Scottish Parliament
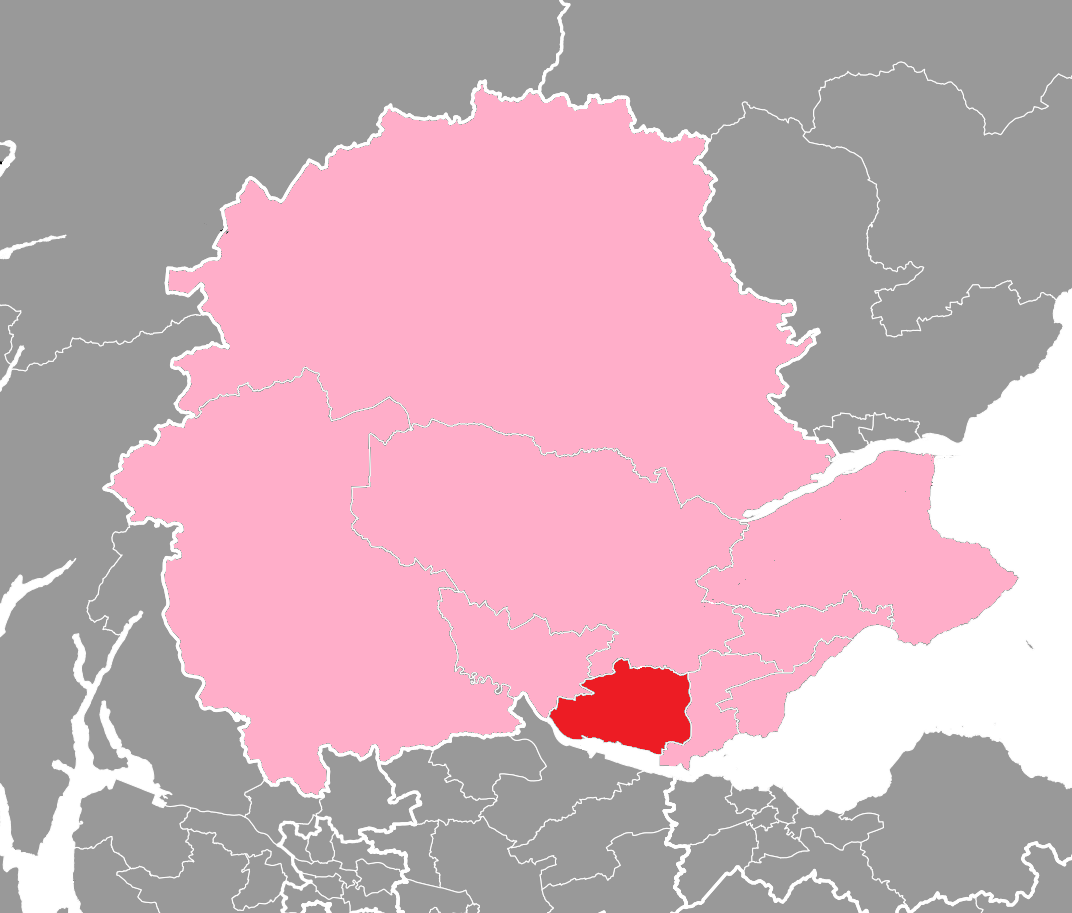

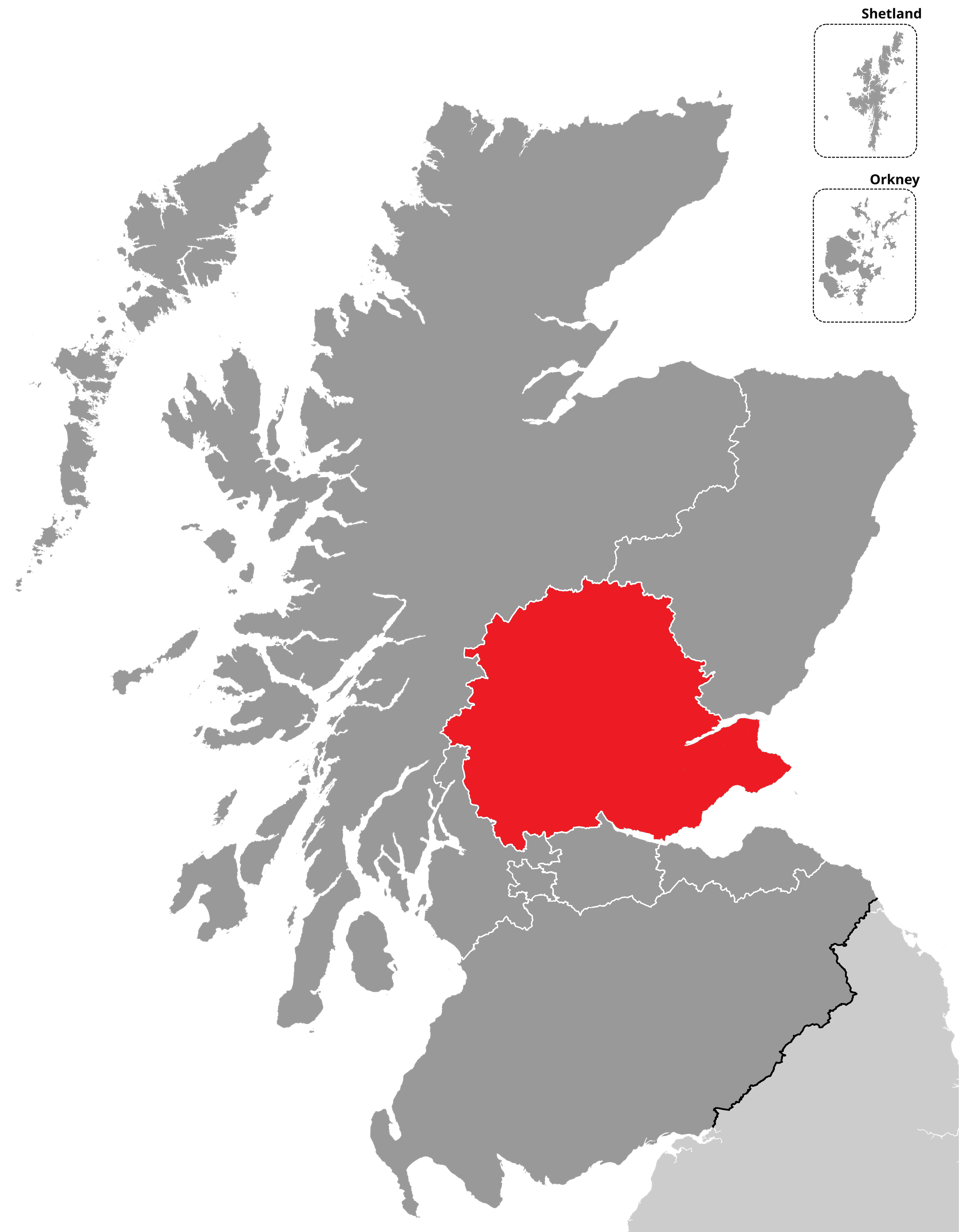
- Dunfermline shown within the Mid Scotland and Fife electoral region and the region shown within Scotland
- Electoral region: Mid Scotland and Fife
- Electorate: 64,247 (2026)

Current constituency
- Created: 2011
- Party: SNP
- MSP: Shirley-Anne Somerville
- Council area: Fife

Dunfermline (Gaelic: Dùn Phàrlain) is a county constituency of the Scottish Parliament covering part of the council area of Fife. It elects one Member of the Scottish Parliament (MSP) by the first past the post method of election. Under the additional-member electoral system used for elections to the Scottish Parliament, it is also one of nine constituencies in the Mid Scotland and Fife electoral region, which elects seven additional members, in addition to the nine constituency MSPs, to produce a form of proportional representation for the region as a whole. Created in 2011, it comprises parts of the former constituencies of Dunfermline East and Dunfermline West.

Bill Walker narrowly won the seat for the Scottish National Party in 2011, however he resigned after being convicted of assault charges in 2013. This led to the 2013 Dunfermline by-election, in which Labour's Cara Hilton was elected, defeating the SNP's Shirley-Anne Somerville. However Somerville subsequently ousted Hilton in the 2016 election and was re-elected in 2021 and 2026.

== Electoral region ==
The other eight constituencies of the Mid Scotland and Fife region are: Clackmannanshire and Dunblane, Cowdenbeath, Kirkcaldy, Mid Fife and Glenrothes, Fife North East, Perthshire North, Perthshire South and Kinross-shire and Stirling. The region covers all of the Clackmannanshire council area, all of the Fife council area, all of the Perth and Kinross council area and all of the Stirling council area.

== Constituency boundaries and council area ==
Map of boundaries (2011-2025)

Fife is represented in the Scottish Parliament by five constituencies, Cowdenbeath, Dunfermline, Kirkcaldy, Mid Fife and Glenrothes and Fife North East.

The Dunfermline constituency was created by the first periodic review of Scottish Parliament boundaries ahead of the 2011 Scottish Parliament election from the following electoral wards of Fife Council:

- In full:
  - West Fife and Coastal Villages
  - Dunfermline Central
  - Dunfermline North
  - Dunfermline South
- In part:
  - Rosyth (shared with Cowdenbeath)

At the second periodic review of Scottish Parliament boundaries in 2025 the seat boundaries were very slightly altered by a minor change of the boundary with the Cowdenbeath constituency in order to match ward boundaries (no electors were affected by this boundary change).

== Member of the Scottish Parliament ==
Election	Member	Party
2011	Bill Walker	SNP
2012	Bill Walker	Independent
2013	Cara Hilton	Labour
2016	Shirley-Anne Somerville	SNP

== Election results ==
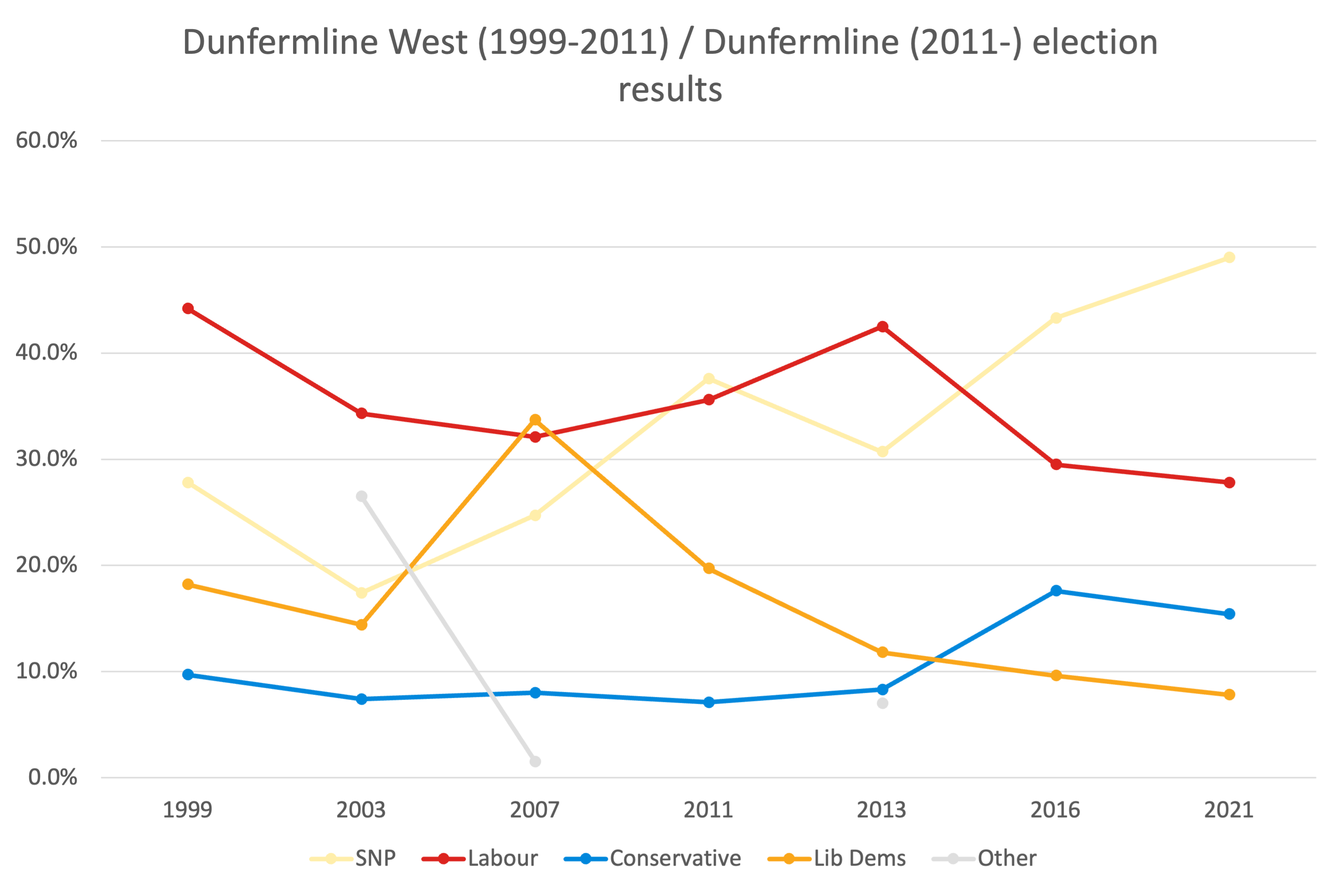
Dunfermline election results 1999-2021

=== 2020s ===
2026 Scottish Parliament election: Dunfermline
Party	Candidate	Constituency			Regional		
Party	Candidate	Votes	%	±%	Votes	%	±%
SNP	Shirley-Anne Somerville (Note: Incumbent member for this constituency)	14,206	41.6	▼7.4	9,588	28.0	▼12.5
Labour	Joe Long	8,769	25.7	▼2.1	7,188	21.0	▲0.4
Reform	Otto Inglis	5,093	14.9	New	5,286	15.4	▲15.2
Green					4,765	13.9	▲5.5
Liberal Democrats	Lauren Buchanan-Quigley	3,849	11.3	▲3.5	3,492	10.2	▲3.0
Conservative	Thomas Heald	2,209	6.5	▼8.9	2,725	7.9	▼11.3
Independent Green Voice					297	0.9	New
AtLS					281	0.8	New
Scottish Family					224	0.7	▲0.1
ISP					215	0.6	New
Scottish Socialist					129	0.4	New
Advance UK					69	0.2	New
Scottish Libertarian					40	0.1	▼0.1
Majority		5,437	15.9	▼5.3			
Valid votes		34,126			34,299		
Invalid votes		181			85		
Turnout		34,307	53.4	▼12.6	34,384	53.5	▼12.5
SNP hold		Swing					
Notes

2021 Scottish Parliament election: Dunfermline
Party	Candidate	Constituency			Regional		
Party	Candidate	Votes	%	±%	Votes	%	±%
SNP	Shirley-Anne Somerville (Note: Incumbent member for this constituency)	20,048	49.0	▲5.7	16,623	40.5	▲0.4
Labour	Julie MacDougall	11,384	27.8	▼1.7	8,468	20.6	▼2.5
Conservative	Roz McCall	6,314	15.4	▼2.2	7,884	19.2	▼0.8
Green					3,432	8.4	▲3.0
Liberal Democrats	Aude Boubaker-Calder	3,196	7.8	▼1.8	2,956	7.2	▼1.4
Alba					772	1.9	New
All for Unity					290	0.7	New
Scottish Family					228	0.6	New
Abolish the Scottish Parliament					97	0.2	New
Scottish Libertarian					94	0.2	New
Freedom Alliance (UK)					78	0.2	New
Reform					62	0.2	New
UKIP					42	0.1	▼1.6
Independent	Martin Keatings				38	0.1	New
Renew					16	0.0	New
Independent	Mercy Kamanja				3	0.0	New
Majority		8,664	21.2	▲7.4			
Valid votes		40,942			41,083		
Invalid votes		167			77		
Turnout		41,109	66.0	▲8.8	41,160	66.0	▲8.8
SNP hold		Swing					

=== 2010s ===
2016 Scottish Parliament election: Dunfermline (Note: Showing changes from 2011 election)
Party	Candidate	Constituency			Region		
Party	Candidate	Votes	%	±%	Votes	%	±%
SNP	Shirley-Anne Somerville	14,257	43.3	▲5.7	13,223	40.1	▼0.9
Labour	Cara Hilton (Note: Incumbent member for this constituency by virtue of by-election victory)	9,699	29.5	▼6.1	7,634	23.1	▼8.8
Conservative	James Reekie	5,797	17.6	▲10.5	6,597	20.0	▲12.2
Liberal Democrats	James Calder	3,156	9.6	▼10.1	2,826	8.6	▼2.7
Green					1,796	5.4	▲2.2
UKIP					598	1.7	▲0.9
Solidarity					138	0.4	▲0.3
RISE					117	0.4	New
Scottish Libertarian					60	0.2	New
Majority		4,558	13.8	▲11.8			
Valid votes		32,909			32,989		
Invalid votes		99			31		
Turnout		33,008	57.2	▲4.2	33,020	57.2	▲4.1
SNP hold		Swing		▲5.9			
Notes

Scottish Parliament by-election, 2013: Dunfermline
Party	Candidate	Votes	%	±%
Labour	Cara Hilton	10,279	42.5	▲6.9
SNP	Shirley-Anne Somerville	7,402	30.7	▼6.9
Liberal Democrats	Susan Leslie	2,852	11.8	▼7.9
Conservative	James Reekie	2,009	8.3	▲1.2
UKIP	Peter Adams	908	3.8	New
Green	Zara Kitson	593	2.5	New
Independent	John Black	161	0.7	New
Majority		2,877	11.8	N/A
Total valid votes		24,200		
Rejected ballots		41		
Turnout		24,241	42.8	▼10.2
Labour gain from SNP		Swing	▲6.9	

2011 Scottish Parliament election: Dunfermline
Party	Candidate	Constituency			Region		
Party	Candidate	Votes	%	±%	Votes	%	±%
SNP	Bill Walker	11,010	37.6	N/A	12,039	41.0	N/A
Labour	Alex Rowley	10,420	35.6	N/A	9,371	31.9	N/A
Liberal Democrats	Jim Tolson (Note: Incumbent member on the party list, or for another constituency)	5,776	19.7	N/A	3,304	11.3	N/A
Conservative	James Reekie	2,093	7.1	N/A	2,283	7.8	N/A
Green					928	3.2	N/A
All-Scotland Pensioners Party					420	1.4	N/A
UKIP					276	0.9	N/A
Socialist Labour					221	0.8	N/A
BNP					197	0.7	N/A
Scottish Christian					99	0.3	N/A
CPA					74	0.3	N/A
Scottish Socialist					72	0.2	N/A
Independent	Andrew Roger				56	0.2	N/A
Solidarity					24	0.1	N/A
Majority		590	2.0	N/A			
Valid votes		29,299			29,364		
Invalid votes		92			82		
Turnout		29,391	53.0	N/A	29,446	53.1	N/A
SNP win (new seat)							

== Footnotes ==
=== Bibliography ===
- "Second Review of Scottish Parliament Boundaries: Report to Scottish Ministers" (PDF). Boundaries Scotland. April 2025.
