= Shirley-Anne Somerville =

Scottish politician (born 1974)

Shirley-Anne Somerville MSP
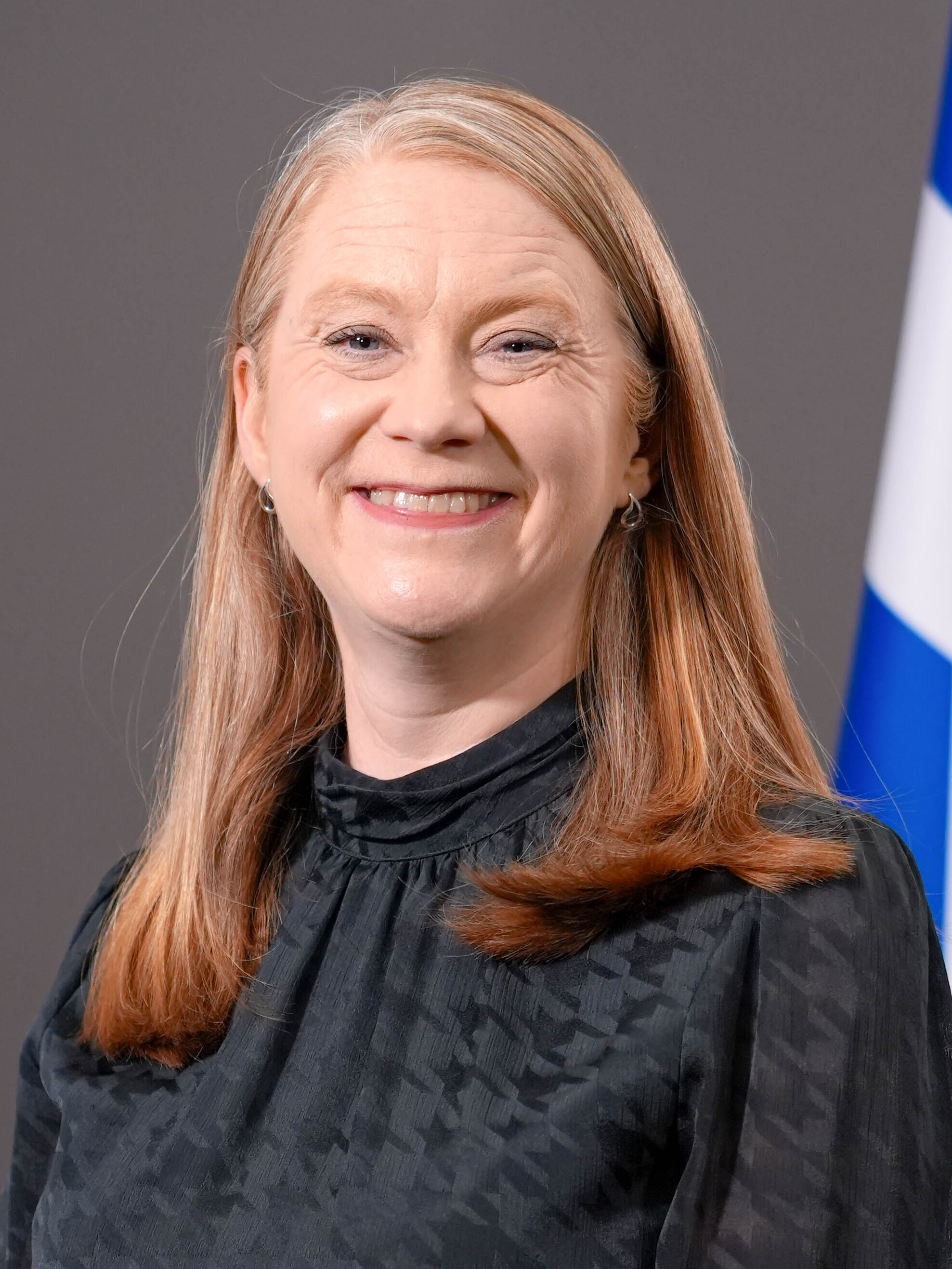
- Official portrait, 2026

Cabinet Secretary for Social Justice and Housing (Note: Cabinet Secretary for Social Justice from 2023 to 2026)
- Incumbent
- Assumed office 29 March 2023
- First Minister: Humza Yousaf; John Swinney
- Preceded by: Shona Robison

Cabinet Secretary for Education and Skills
- In office 19 May 2021 – 29 March 2023
- First Minister: Nicola Sturgeon
- Preceded by: John Swinney
- Succeeded by: Jenny Gilruth

Cabinet Secretary for Social Security and Older People
- In office 26 June 2018 – 19 May 2021
- First Minister: Nicola Sturgeon
- Preceded by: Jeane Freeman
- Succeeded by: Shona Robison (Social Justice, Housing and Local Government)

Minister for Further Education, Higher Education and Science
- In office 18 May 2016 – 26 June 2018
- First Minister: Nicola Sturgeon
- Preceded by: Alasdair Allan
- Succeeded by: Richard Lochhead
Parliamentary offices
Member of the Scottish Parliament for Dunfermline
Incumbent
Assumed office 5 May 2016
Preceded by	Cara Hilton
Majority	5,437 (15.9%)
Member of the Scottish Parliament for Lothians (1 of 7 Regional MSPs)
In office 31 August 2007 – 22 March 2011
Preceded by	Stefan Tymkewycz
Succeeded by	Constituency Abolished

Personal details
- Born: 2 September 1974 (age 52) Cardenden, Fife, Scotland
- Party: Scottish National Party
- Children: 2
- Education: Queen Margaret University; University of Strathclyde; University of Stirling

Shirley-Anne Somerville (born 2 September 1974) is a Scottish politician who has served as Cabinet Secretary for Social Justice and Housing since May 2026. A member of the Scottish National Party (SNP), she has been the Member of the Scottish Parliament (MSP) for Dunfermline since 2016, having previously served as an additional member for the Lothians region from 2007 to 2011.

Born in Kirkcaldy, Somerville attended the University of Strathclyde, and later the University of Stirling, earning a BA (Hons) in Economics and Politics, and a Diploma in Housing studies respectively. After graduating, she worked as a Policy and Public Affairs Officer, and in 2006 she attended Queen Margaret University. In the 2007 Scottish election, she was an SNP candidate for the Edinburgh Central constituency, but failed to win the seat, coming third. Following the resignation of Stefan Tymkewycz, Somerville succeeded him as the MSP for the Lothian region. She lost her seat in the 2011 election and in 2012 was announced as a director of Yes Scotland. After losing the 2013 Dunfermline by-election, she stood down as director of communities.

In the 2016 Scottish Parliament election, Somerville was elected to serve as the MSP for the Dunfermline constituency. She served as Minister for Further Education, Higher Education and Science from 2016 to 2018, before being appointed to the Scottish Cabinet as Cabinet Secretary for Social Security and Older People in Nicola Sturgeon's 2018 cabinet reshuffle. Somerville was re-elected to the Scottish Parliament in the 2021 election, and in Sturgeon's third government, she was appointed Cabinet Secretary for Education and Skills. Following her appointment, she announced that the Scottish Qualifications Authority and Education Scotland would be reformed, following widespread criticism.

== Early life ==
=== Early years and education ===
Shirley-Anne Somerville was born on 2 September 1974 in Cardenden in Fife. She was educated at Kirkcaldy High School, before attending the University of Strathclyde from 1992 to 1996, graduating with a BA (Hons) in Economics and Politics. From 1997 to 1999, Somerville attended the University of Stirling, where she gained a Diploma in Housing Studies. Before being elected to the Scottish Parliament in 2007, she attended the Queen Margaret University, where she took a Diploma in Public Relations.

=== Early career ===
She worked as a parliamentary researcher for Duncan Hamilton, who was the MSP for Highlands and Islands. From 2001 to 2004, she was a Policy and Public Affairs Officer at the Chartered Institute of Housing, before working as a Media and Campaigns Officer at the Royal College of Nursing from 2004 to 2007.

=== Early political years ===
Somerville joined the Scottish National Party (SNP) when she was 16. As a member of the party's youth wing, she campaigned alongside Nicola Sturgeon and Shona Robison.

In the 2001 UK general election, Somerville stood as the SNP's candidate for Kirkcaldy, where she came in 2nd place with 22.2% of the vote. In the 2007 Scottish Parliament election, she was the candidate in the Edinburgh Central constituency, where she came in 3rd place with 25.5% of the vote.

== Political career ==
=== Member of the Scottish Parliament; 2007-2011 ===
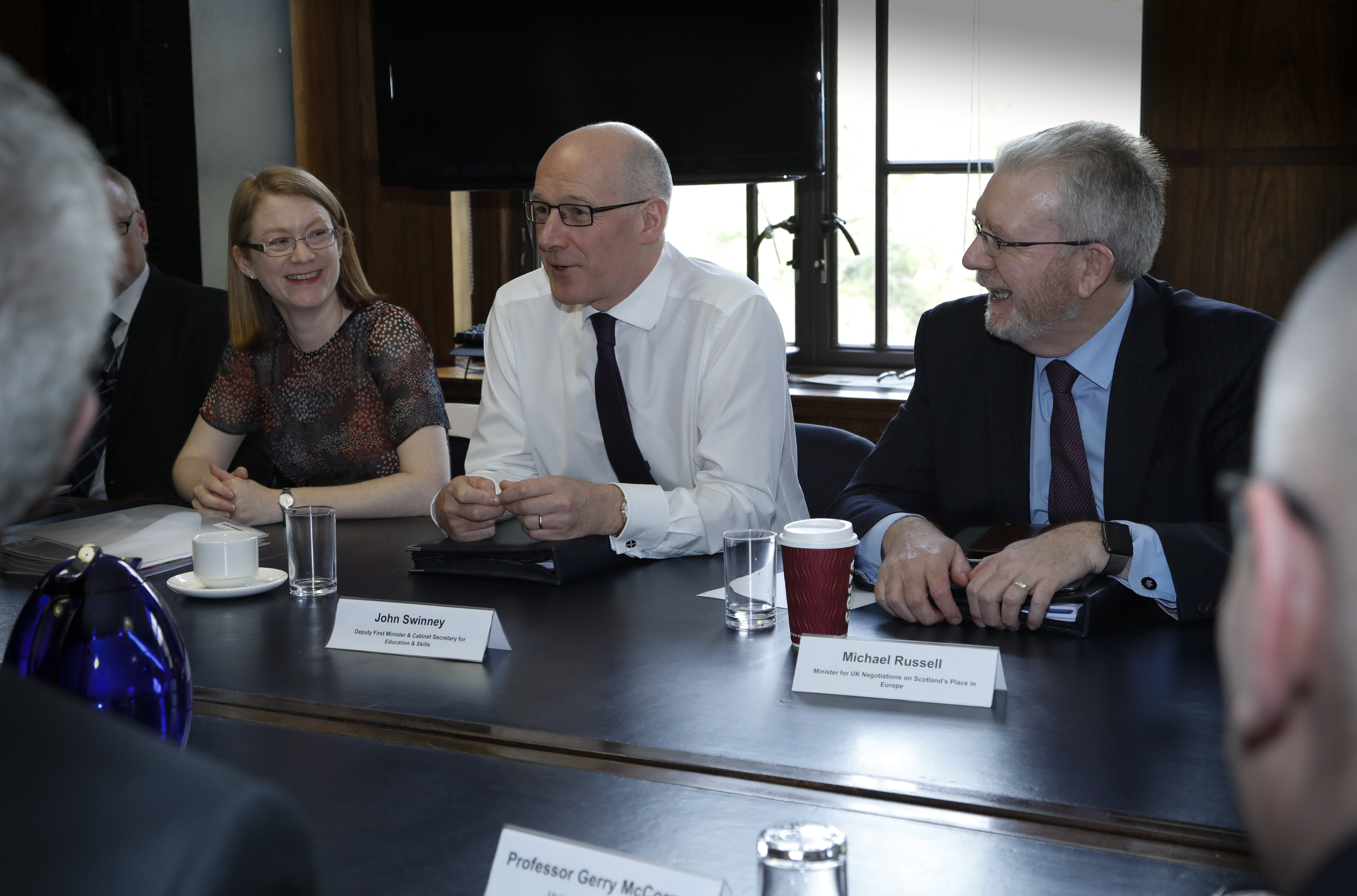
Somerville (left), John Swinney (centre), and Michael Russell (right)

On 31 August 2007, Stefan Tymkewycz resigned his seat in the Scottish Parliament representing the Lothians region in order to concentrate on serving as a City of Edinburgh councillor. Somerville was selected by the SNP to succeed him. In the 2011 Scottish Parliament election, she lost her seat.

=== Director of Yes Scotland ===
On the launch of the cross-party Yes Scotland campaign in 2012, Somerville was announced as its director of communities. She later stood as the SNP candidate in the Dunfermline by-election, 24 October 2013, coming second behind Cara Hilton of Scottish Labour. She did not return to her position in Yes Scotland after the by-election. She campaigned in favour of Scottish independence in the run up to the 2014 referendum.

=== Return to Holyrood ===
In the Scottish Parliament election of 2016, Somerville again stood in the Dunfermline constituency. This time she was successful in securing the seat, defeating Cara Hilton on a majority of 4,558 votes. She held the seat by significantly bigger margins in the Scottish Parliament elections of 2021 and 2026.

==== Junior minister ====
In May 2016, she was appointed Minister of Further Education, Higher Education and Science.

=== Cabinet Secretary for Social Security (2018–2021) ===
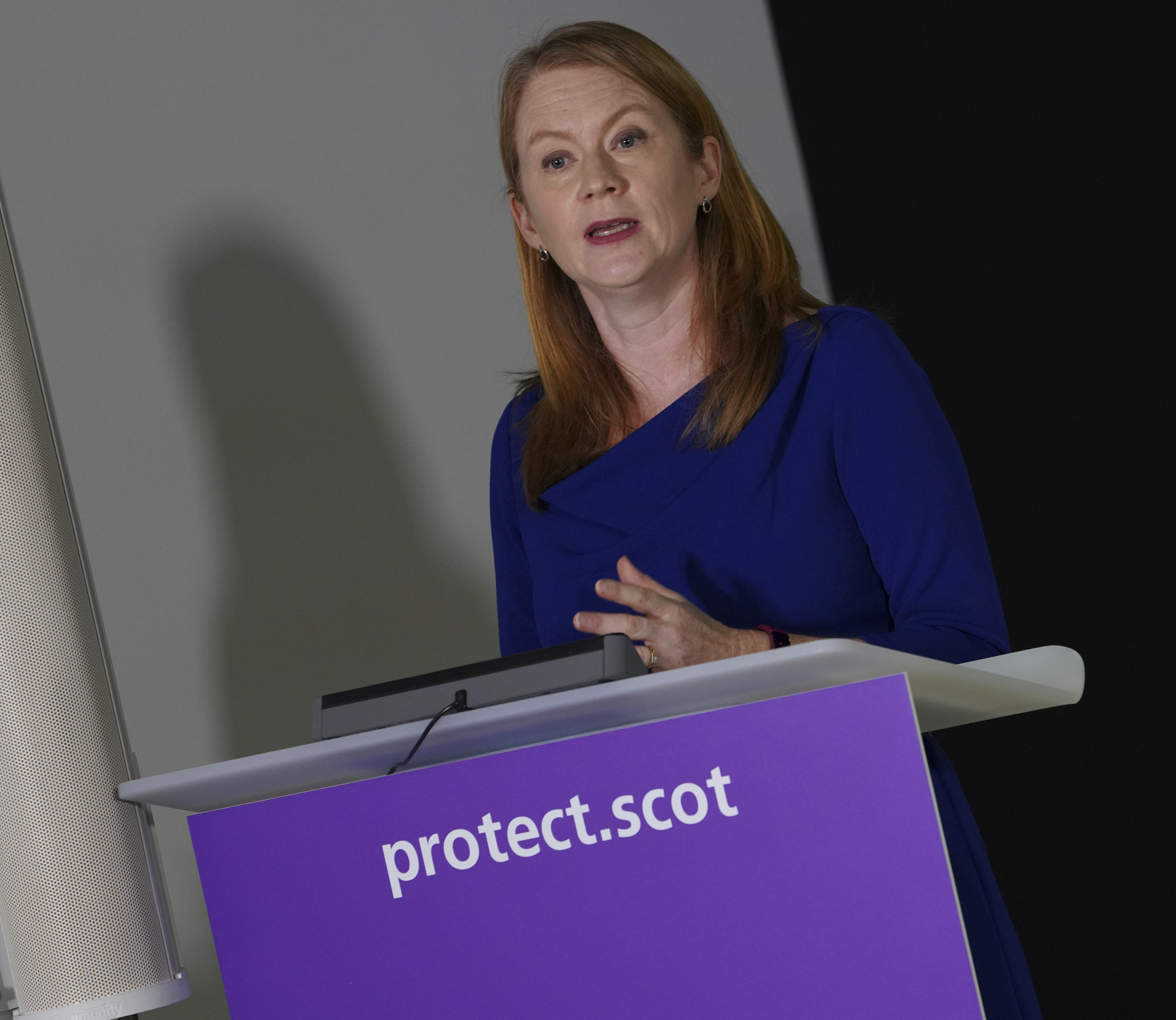
Somerville at Scottish Government Press Conference on COVID-19, September 2020

On 26 June 2018, Sturgeon performed a cabinet reshuffle of her second cabinet. She promoted Somerville to the new cabinet level position of Cabinet Secretary for Social Security and Older People, succeeding Jeane Freeman who served as the junior minister equivalent. In February 2021, Christina McKelvie announced a short medical leave and her role was covered by Somerville as Minister for Equalities and Older People.

==== Gender recognition ====
In early 2020, Somerville announced the government would propose to amend the Gender Recognition Act 2004 of the Parliament of the United Kingdom. The bill would make it easier for people to change their name legally, drop the requirement for medical evidence and lower the age limit for applications from 18 to 16. The bill has been opposed by For Women Scotland. On an interview with STV, Somerville recognised that women's rights are exceptionally important and have been long-fought for. She emphasised her commitment not to jeopardise women's rights. Somerville hoped for the bill to be passed by the end of the 5th Scottish Parliament, however, delays due to the COVID-19 pandemic have affected this ambition.

=== Cabinet Secretary for Education (2021–2023) ===
In the 2021 Scottish Parliament election, Somerville secured a second term as the MSP for the Dunfermline constituency. The SNP fell two seats short of an overall majority in the election, however, remained the largest party, with more than double the seats of the Scottish Conservatives. Sturgeon announced her intention to form a third government and appointed Somerville as the Cabinet Secretary for Education and Skills, succeeding John Swinney, who was mounted with pressure by opposition to resign. The general secretary of the Educational Institute of Scotland (EIS) Larry Flanagan welcomed her appointment, but added, "The first issue the Cabinet Secretary will need to address is an end to the scandal of temporary contracts throughout the education system.".

==== SQA and Education Scotland reform ====
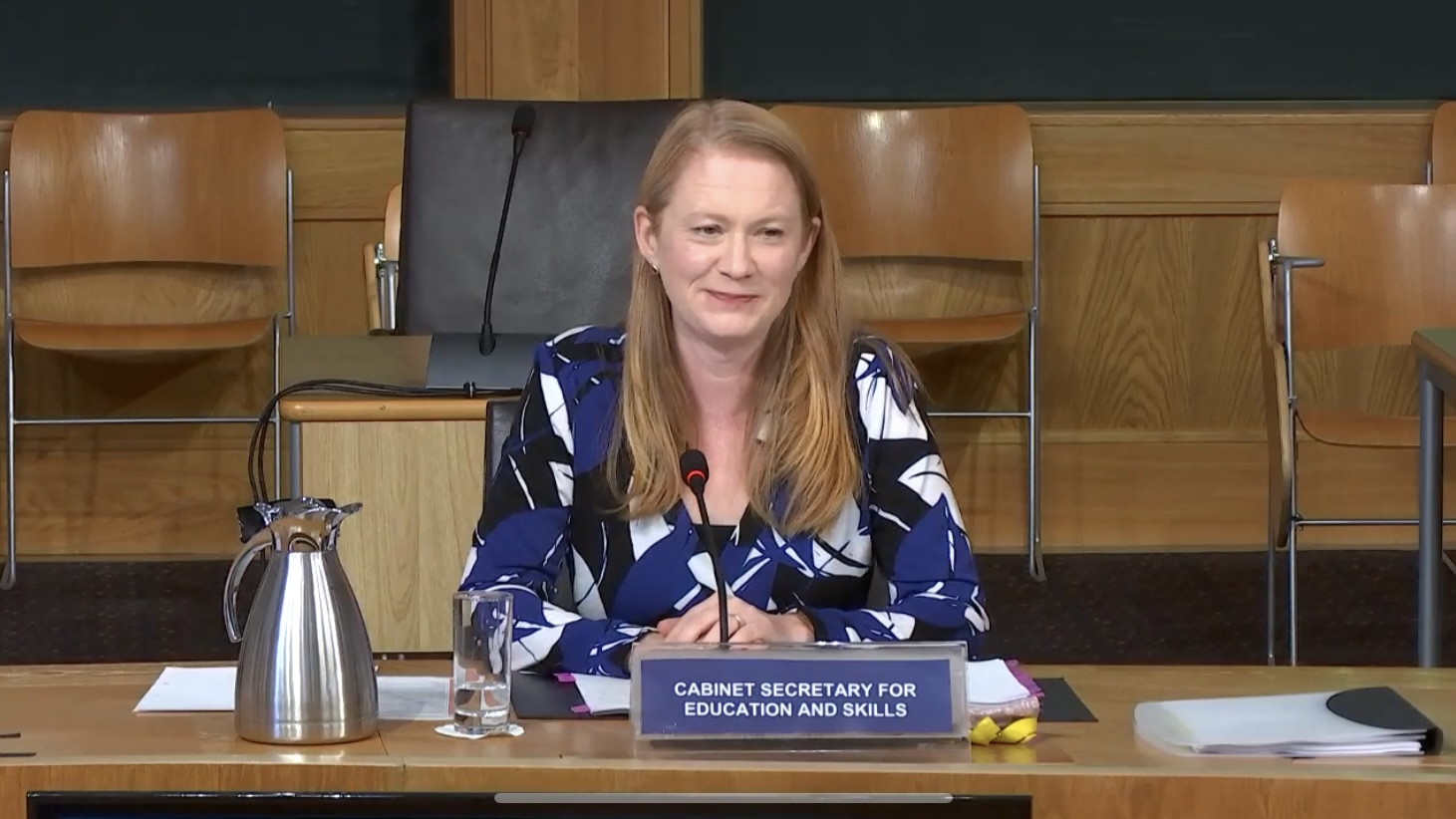
Somerville before the Scottish Parliament's committee on education, October 2021

In June 2021, Somerville revealed plans to reform the Scottish Qualifications Authority (SQA) and Education Scotland was under way. The following year exams were scrapped and the SQA was criticised for down-grading teachers predictions which were based on pupil assessments. After public outcry and protests from pupils, the Scottish Government u-turned its decision and allowed teachers predictions to be considered for pupil grading. In the 2021 exam diet, exams were cancelled too, but students claimed the "assessments" were the equivalent to exams.

The OECD published a report on the Curriculum for Excellence (CfE) and recommended the government considered creating a "specialist stand-alone agency responsible for curriculum". Somerville responded: "The OECD report is crystal clear - Curriculum for Excellence is the right approach for Scotland. In fact, despite all the criticism here at home, the OECD tells us it is viewed internationally as an inspiring example of curriculum practice. However, 10 years on from CfE being introduced, it is right and proper that we review how it is being implemented.".

In March 2022, Somerville confirmed the SQA would be replaced by Qualifications Scotland and Education Scotland would be replaced by a new executive agency by the summer of 2024.

=== Cabinet Secretary for Social Justice (2023–present) ===
Following Humza Yousaf's successful election in March 2023 to become the Scottish National Party's leader following Nicola Sturgeon's resignation, Somerville was appointed as Cabinet Secretary for Social Justice.

She then retained this post in John Swinney's subsequent government formed in May 2024. She was given the additional portfolio of Housing in 2026.

== Personal life ==
Somerville lives in North Queensferry with her husband and two children. She is a trustee of Shelter Scotland, and is a member of the RSPB and the Scottish Wildlife Trust.
