= Cara Hilton =

Labour member of the Scottish Parliament (born 1975)

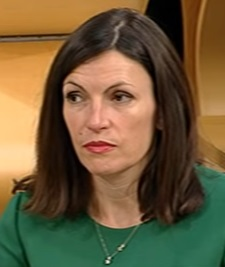
- Hilton in 2015

Member of the Scottish Parliament for Dunfermline
- In office 25 October 2013 – 24 March 2016
- Preceded by: Bill Walker
- Succeeded by: Shirley-Anne Somerville

Personal details
- Born: 1975 (age 50–51)
- Party: Scottish Labour
- Other political affiliations: Campaign for Socialism
- Spouse: Simon
- Relations: Cathy Peattie (mother)
- Children: 3

Cara Laura Hilton (born 1975) is a Scottish Labour politician, who was the Member of the Scottish Parliament (MSP) for Dunfermline from 2013 to 2016. She has served as a councillor for Dunfermline South since 2022.

== Political career ==
Hilton was the Labour candidate at the Dunfermline by-election on 20 October 2013. She won by a majority of more than 2,800 votes, overturning a previous Scottish National Party (SNP) majority of 590. This was the first time ever that Labour had won a parliamentary seat (in either the UK or Scottish parliaments) from the SNP at a by-election.

In her victory speech, Hilton praised the courage of preceding MSP Bill Walker's ex-wives. Walker's conviction for assault against his former wives had led to his resignation from parliament, causing the by-election. Alex Salmond accused her of running a dishonest campaign, including the circulation of a leaflet criticised by the SNP as "demonstrably untrue".

In the Scottish Parliament election of 2016, Hilton lost her seat to the SNP's Shirley-Anne Somerville, whom she had previously defeated at the by-election three years earlier. Along with the loss of the neighbouring Cowdenbeath constituency, this left the Labour Party without parliamentary representation in Fife for the first time since 1910.

Hilton was the Labour Party candidate for Dumfermline and West Fife in the 2017 and 2019 general elections, but both times came second behind the incumbent SNP MP Douglas Chapman.

Hilton served as vice-chair of Scottish Labour from 2019 to 2020, and has served as chair of Scottish Labour since 2020.

== Personal life ==
Hilton is the daughter of former Labour MSP and Scottish Labour chair Cathy Peattie. Her husband is Simon, and she has three children: Luca, Louie and Sophia.
