= Dunfermline South (ward) =

Electoral ward of Fife Council in Scotland

Location of the ward

Dunfermline South is one of the 22 wards used to elect members of the Fife council. It elects four Councillors.

== Councillors ==
Election	Councillors			
2007	Brian John Goodall (SNP)	Mike Rumney (Labour)	Tony Martin (Liberal Democrats)	Dave Walker (Liberal Democrats)
2012	Brian John Goodall (SNP)	Mike Rumney (Labour)	Tony Martin (Liberal Democrats)	Cara Hilton (Labour)
2013	Brian John Goodall (SNP)	Billy Pollock (Labour)	Tony Martin (Liberal Democrats)	Cara Hilton (Labour)
2015	Brian John Goodall (SNP)	Billy Pollock (Labour)	Tony Martin (Liberal Democrats)	Fay Sinclair (SNP)
2017	David Ross (Conservative)	Ross Patterson (Labour)	James Calder (Liberal Democrats)	Fay Sinclair (SNP)
2022	Lynn Ballantyne Wardlaw (SNP)	Cara Hilton (Labour)	James Calder (Liberal Democrats)	Naz Anis-Miah (SNP)

== Election results ==
=== 2022 election ===
Dunfermline South - 4 seats
Party	Candidate	FPv%	Count								
Party	Candidate	FPv%	1	2	3	4	5	6	7	8	9
Liberal Democrats	James Calder (incumbent)	19.5	1,523	1,528	1,542	1,586					
Labour	Cara Hilton	19.3	1,505	1,508	1,513	1,550	1,558	1,794			
SNP	Lynn Ballantyne Wardlaw	16.9	1,316	1,340	1,344	1,408	1,410	1,425	1,446	1,543	1,601
SNP	Naz Anis-Miah	16.6	1,292	1,308	1,314	1,382	1,383	1,390	1,409	1,534	1,568
Conservative	David Ross (incumbent)	10.6	825	826	846	855	860	878	917	1,008	
Independent	Martin Willcocks	6.9	541	564	580	611	613	619	641		
Labour	Ross Paterson (incumbent)	3.9	304	308	846	327	328				
Green	Tom Freeman	3.6	279	288	295						
Scottish Family	Paul Lynch	1.3	105	112							
Alba	Rob Thompson	1.3	103								
Electorate: 17,563 Valid: 7,793 Spoilt: 92 Quota: 1,559 Turnout: 44.9%

== Notes ==
Dunfermline South - 4 seats
Party	Candidate	FPv%	Count						
Party	Candidate	FPv%	1	2	3	4	5	6	7
Conservative	David Ross	23.2	1,660						
SNP	Fay Sinclair (incumbent)	18.17	1,302	1,304.9	1,361.3	1,389.5	1,403.8	1,404.03	2,505.8
Liberal Democrats	James Calder	17.08	1,224	1,325.7	1,389.9	1,436.2			
SNP	Brian Goodall (incumbent)	15.7	1,128	1,130.3	1,189.5	1,219.7	1,237.7	1,238.09	
Labour	Ross Patterson	15.2	1,086	1,116.8	1,148.3	1,560.9			
Labour	Billy Pollock (incumbent)	7.2	521	539.9	555.3				
Green	Michael Collie	3.4	245	253.6					
Electorate: 16,388 Valid: 7,166 Spoilt: 75 Quota: 1,434 Turnout: 7,241 (44.2%)

Dunfermline South by-election (7 May 2015) - 1 seat
Party	Candidate	FPv%	Count
Party	Candidate	FPv%	1
SNP	Fay Sinclair	51.52	5,899
Labour	Andrew Verrecchia	27.82	3,185
Conservative	David Ross	11.56	1,324
Liberal Democrats	James Calder	9.09	1,041
Electorate: 17,031 Valid: 11,449 Spoilt: 132 Quota: 5,725 Turnout: 11,581 (67.8%)

Dunfermline South by-election (24 October 2013) - 1 seat
Party	Candidate	FPv%	Count					
Party	Candidate	FPv%	1	2	3	4	5	6
Labour	Billy Pollock	39.7	2,552	2,568	2,618	2,697	3,170	4,086
SNP	Helen Cannon-Todd	32.0	2,057	2,075	2,112	2,142	2,358	
Liberal Democrats	Robin Munro	15.7	1,009	1,029	1,073	1,257		
Conservative	David Ross	7.0	450	497	504			
Green	Angela Dixon	2.8	183	201				
UKIP	Judith Rideout	2.8	183					
Valid: 6,434 Quota: 3,217

Dunfermline South - 4 seats
Party	Candidate	FPv%	Count						
Party	Candidate	FPv%	1	2	3	4	5	6	7
Labour	Mike Rumney (incumbent)	22.02	1,271						
Labour	Cara Hilton	20.69	1,194						
Liberal Democrats	Tony Martin (incumbent)	20.62	1,190						
SNP	Brian Goodall (incumbent)	17.54	1,012	1,025.4	1,029.4	1,034.7	1,081.1	1,144.5	1,681.1
SNP	Fay Sinclair	9.15	528	540.3	544.6	548.4	584.9	609.2	
Conservative	Margaret Reid Fairgrieve	6.41	370	374.9	377.4	385.3	420.8		
Green	Angela Dixon	3.57	206	220.7	227.7	232.8			
Electorate: 15,927 Valid: 5,771 Spoilt: 64 Quota: 1,155 Turnout: 5,829 (36.60%)

Dunfermline South
Party	Candidate	FPv%	%	Seat	Count
Liberal Democrats	Tony Martin	1,816	26.1	1	1
SNP	Brian John Goodall	1,583	22.8	2	1
Labour	Mike Rumney	1,446	20.8	3	1
Labour	Bob Young	738	10.6		
Liberal Democrats	Dave Walker	627	9.0	4	6
Conservative	Richard Jules Watt	515	7.4		
Green	Angela Dixon	231	3.3		
