= Dorothy-Grace Elder =

Scottish journalist and politician

Member of the Scottish Parliament for Glasgow (1 of 7 Regional MSPs)
- In office 6 May 1999 – 31 March 2003

Personal details
- Born: Dundee, Scotland
- Party: Independent (2002–2003); Scottish National Party (until 2002)

Dorothy-Grace Elder is a Scottish journalist and former Member of the Scottish Parliament (MSP) for the Glasgow region 1999–2003. She sat as an independent MSP 2002–2003, having first sat as a Scottish National Party member from 1999 until she left the party in 2002. Among achievements for campaigning, she was awarded the 1996 Britain's Reporter of the Year for investigative journalism at the British Press Awards. In 2019, she was presented with the Lifetime Achievement Award at the Scottish Press Awards.

== Journalism ==
Elder was the first woman to run an investigative team, "The Insiders", on the Glasgow Herald, where she worked on reporters, news features and leaders. She was later recruited by TV, beginning with BBC Scotland's news programme Reporting Scotland. She wrote, filmed and produced numerous documentaries on social injustices for STV and the network. Other programmes for Scottish Television include Paramedics. and the first Scottish documentary on AIDS in 1988. For BBC Scotland and BBC Two, she filmed "I Preferred Madness"- the life story of Scots television pioneer John Logie Baird – filming between the UK, Canada and New York.

She worked as features editor and columnist on Scotland's first cooperatively run newspaper, the ill-fated Scottish Daily News.

Elder has written columns and investigations for papers, including The Herald, Sunday Mail, Scotland on Sunday "Rattling the Cages" the Scottish Daily Express "Off the Leash", The Daily Express (UK) "Dear Dorothy".

She campaigned against conditions in Russian prisons for the destitute, including street children.

In 2007, she was appointed to an honorary professorship from Robert Gordon University in Aberdeen. She lectures in investigative journalism to honours year students of the university.

== Political career ==
In June 1998, she was announced as an SNP candidate for the newly formed Scottish Parliament in the elections that would take place the following year.

In the 1999 election she stood in the Glasgow Baillieston constituency and gained a 17% swing to the SNP in a former Labour heartland. Although she did not win the seat outright, she was elected on the list to Parliament as a Scottish National Party (SNP) representative for Glasgow region. She was a member of the Health and Community Care Committee and a member of the Public Petitions Committee. A left-winger, she supported Alex Neil in the SNP leadership election of 2000.

As an MSP, Elder continued campaigning. She researched pollution and ill health in the East End of Glasgow, becoming the first MSP to take a pollution case to Brussels against dumping in the East End and an incinerator for dead cattle being allowed near housing and a hospital. She won the case in Europe. While in the Scottish Parliament, Elder launched a cross party group to look at shortage of help for chronic pain patients. In February 2002, she led a member's debate on the issue. Scotland had no residential service for severe chronic pain cases, with some sent hundreds of miles to Bath. Elder fought for 12 years for a residential service in Scotland, which was achieved in 2015. She continues to be strongly involved with the cross-party group, long after her term as MSP finished.

She became dissatisfied with the way in which the SNP was being run, and in May 2002 she resigned from the SNP over what she described as "stupid, arrogant and bullying behaviour". From that point, she sat in the Parliament as an independent MSP. She did not stand for re-election at the 2003 election, returning to journalism instead.

She is also a former Glasgow University Scottish Nationalist Association candidate for the post of rector of the University of Glasgow, losing to the actor Richard Wilson in 1996. She was known for her campaigning abilities.

Reflecting on her political career in 2021, Elder wrote that despite sharing an office for three years with future First Minister Nicola Sturgeon, Sturgeon had refused to speak to her. She also claimed that: "I was reported to the chief whip after a woman MSP and one of Nicola [Sturgeon]’s chums discovered I had privately asked a women’s group for advice on male bullying in politics... I was set to be disciplined. It made me sick and I walked out." The SNP responded: "Ms Elder has not been a member for almost two decades." In 2026, five years after that retrospective and twenty-four years after she left the SNP, Elder revealed that Kenneth Gibson, by then the Presiding Officer of the Scottish Parliament, had been the subject of her bullying report. This was amid a series of bullying allegations made against Gibson by former SNP members.

== Awards and honours ==
1994 Oliver Brown Award for services to Scotland

1996 Britain's Reporter of the Year at the British Press Awards for investigative journalism

Citation from the City of Pushkin for Humanitarian Aid to hospitals and prisons 1998

Medical Journalists' Assoc UK Health Campaign Award 2014

In 2019, she was presented with the Lifetime Achievement Award at the Scottish Press Awards.
