= West Fife and Coastal Villages (ward) =

Electoral ward of Fife, Scotland

Location of the ward

West Fife and Coastal Villages is one of the 22 wards used to elect members of the Fife area council in central east Scotland. It elects three Councillors.

== Councillors ==
Election	Councillors			
2007	Bill Walker (SNP)	Bobby McClelland (Labour)	William Ferguson (Ind.)	Gerry McMullan (Liberal Democrats)
2012	Kate Stewart (SNP/ Ind.)	Bobby McClelland (Labour)	William Ferguson (Ind.)	Alice Callaghan (Labour)
2017	Kate Stewart (SNP/ Ind.)	Bobby McClelland (Labour)	Mino Manekshaw (Conservative)	3 seats
2020	Kate Stewart (SNP/ Ind.)	Bobby McClelland (Labour)	Mino Manekshaw (Conservative)	3 seats
2022	Sam Steele (SNP)	Graeme Downie (Labour)	Conner Young (Conservative)	3 seats
2024	Sam Steele (SNP)	Karen Beaton (Labour)	Conner Young (Conservative)	3 seats

== Election results ==
=== 2024 by-election ===
West Fife and Coastal Villages by-election (28 November 2024) - 1 seat
Party	Candidate	FPv%	Count						
Party	Candidate	FPv%	1	2	3	4	5	6	7
Labour	Karen Beaton	33.1	881	882	890	921	1,010	1,147	1,474
SNP	Paul Steele	33.1	879	887	896	944	985	1,015	
Conservative	David Ross	16.0	426	434	444	449	516		
Liberal Democrats	Paul Buchanan-Quigley	8.5	227	232	246	279			
Green	Fiona McOwan	4.8	128	130	141				
Independent	George Morton	2.4	64	77					
Scottish Family	Danny Smith	1.9	53						
Electorate: 13,577 Valid: 2,658 Spoilt: 26 Quota: 1,330 Turnout: 19.8%

== Notes ==
West Fife and Coastal Villages - 3 seats
Party	Candidate	FPv%	Count									
Party	Candidate	FPv%	1	2	3	4	5	6	7	8	9	10
Labour	Graeme Downie	24.9	1,482	1,487	1,492							
SNP	Sam Steele	21.8	1,301	1,307	1,330	1,330	1,336	1,417	1,448	1,509		
Conservative	Conner Young	17.1	1,017	1,020	1,020	1,020	1,056	1,062	1,179	1,286	1,286	1,425
SNP	Katie Strang	14.0	837	843	860	860	865	933	961	1,012	1,027	
Labour	Jacqueline McKenna	7.7	458	458	461	461	471	501	640			
Liberal Democrats	Jo Cockburn	6.7	399	402	406	406	418	460				
Green	Craig McCutcheon	4.1	246	251	264	264	273					
Scottish Family	Danny Smith	1.6	94	97	107	107						
Alba	William Gavin	1.4	83	92								
Independent	Martin Keatings	0.8	46									
Electorate: 13,553 Valid: 5,963 Spoilt: 129 Quota: 1,491 Turnout: 44.9%

== Notes ==
West Fife and Coastal Villages - 3 seats
Party	Candidate	FPv%	Count						
Party	Candidate	FPv%	1	2	3	4	5	6	7
Labour	Bobby Clelland (incumbent)	27.08%	1,682						
Conservative	Mino Manekshaw	19.1%	1,186	1,190.4	1,197.4	1,253.5	1,382.4	1,542.6	1,575.5
SNP	Kate Stewart (incumbent)†	17.45%	1,084	1,091.1	1,138.1	1,173.3	1,203.4	1,271.7	2,250
SNP	Willie Gavin	15.94%	990	994.2	1,018.4	1,031.6	1,067.6	1,139	
Labour	Suzanne Davies	8.66%	538	635.1	654.5	691.5	816.2		
Liberal Democrats	Aude Boubaker-Calder	5.8%	360	363.5	382.5	438			
Independent	Martin Keatings	3.54%	220	222.6	245.9				
Green	Jeroen Van Leeuwen	2.43%	151	152.3					
Electorate: 13,030 Valid: 6,211 Spoilt: 137 Quota: 1,553 Turnout: 6,348 (48.7%)

West Fife and Coastal Villages - 4 seats
Party	Candidate	FPv%	Count							
Party	Candidate	FPv%	1	2	3	4	5	6	7	8
Labour	Bobby Clelland (incumbent)	30.65	1,933							
SNP	Kate Stewart	15.73	992	1,020.8	1,035.8	1,055.3	1,077.8	1,597.3		
Labour	Alice Callaghan	14.11	890	1,420.1						
Independent	William Ferguson (incumbent)	11.46	723	749.4	771.6	810.1	956.8	975.2	1,053.8	1,394.8
Liberal Democrats	Gerry McMullan (incumbent)	9.59	605	618.5	631.1	646.2	859.5	871.6	916	
SNP	Len Woods	8.77	553	565.8	569.7	576.2	590.1			
Conservative	Bruce Holborn	8.01	505	511.9	516.6	531.1				
Scottish Senior Citizens	Charlie Ross	1.68	106	114.7	128.2					
Electorate: 14,331 Valid: 6,307 Spoilt: 81 Quota: 863 Turnout: 6,385 (44.01%)

West Fife and Coastal Villages
Party	Candidate	FPv%	%	Seat	Count
Labour	Bobby Clelland	1,826	23.0	1	1
Liberal Democrats	Gerry McMullan	1,722	21.6	2	1
SNP	Bill Walker	1,663	20.9	3	1
Independent	William Ferguson	1,244	15.6	4	6
Labour	Helen Law	896	11.3		
Conservative	Dennis Halligan	605	7.6		
