= Bill Walker (SNP politician) =

Scottish nationalist politician

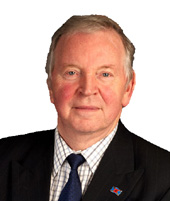

Member of the Scottish Parliament for Dunfermline
- In office 5 May 2011 – 7 September 2013
- Preceded by: Constituency established
- Succeeded by: Cara Hilton

Personal details
- Born: William George Walker; 31 March 1942 (age 84) Edinburgh, Scotland
- Party: Independent (since April 2012); Scottish National Party (before April 2012)
- Education: University of Edinburgh
- Website: https://billwalkerdunfermline.com/

William George Walker (born 31 March 1942) is a Scottish politician who was the Member of the Scottish Parliament (MSP) for the Dunfermline constituency from 2011 until his resignation in 2013. He was elected as a Scottish National Party (SNP) Member but was expelled from the party in 2012 and then served as an Independent Member. In 2013, he was convicted of 23 charges of domestic violence, and then resigned as an MSP following pressure from other politicians and the press.

== Early life ==
Walker was born in Edinburgh. He attended the old Royal High School in Edinburgh. He obtained a First Class Honours BSc degree in Electrical Engineering from the University of Edinburgh and a Postgraduate Certificate in Computer Programming from Illinois Institute of Technology in Chicago, and a master's degree in Business Administration from the University of Edinburgh Management School.

He is a Chartered Engineer, a Fellow of the Institution of Engineering and Technology, and a Fellow of the Chartered Management Institute.

== Political career ==
He served as a councillor on Fife Council from 2007 until 2012. While serving as a West Fife and Coastal Villages Councillor, Walker was a member of Fife Council's Environment, Enterprise & Transportation Committee from 2007 to 2012.

In May 2011, he was elected MSP for the Dunfermline Scottish Parliament constituency, gaining the seat for the Scottish National Party.

In August 2011, Walker criticised proposals to legalise same-sex marriage in Scotland.

In October 2011, he expressed dismay at the UK Government's decision to drop its support for the Carbon Capture and Storage project in Longannet Power Station which was in his constituency.

On 4 March 2012, the Sunday Herald published claims that his three previous marriages had ended with allegations of violent behaviour towards his wives. The same day, the Scottish National Party suspended him for allegedly not declaring similar claims cited in no-contest divorce actions dating back many years. The SNP expelled Walker on 8 April for allegedly not declaring the allegations cited in his uncontested divorce proceedings during the MSP vetting process. He continued to sit in the Scottish Parliament as an Independent and appealed his expulsion.

== Trial and conviction ==
A case was brought against Walker and was heard at Edinburgh Sheriff Court on nine days over a two-week period and adjourned on 2 August 2013. On 22 August 2013, Walker was convicted of 23 charges of assault and one breach of the peace in relation to three ex-wives and a stepdaughter.

By early September a majority of MSPs had also backed a motion calling on him to resign. On 7 September 2013, he resigned from the Scottish Parliament, claiming there had been a "media onslaught" against him.

On 20 September 2013, he was sentenced to 12 months in prison by Edinburgh Sheriff Court. When sentencing him, Sheriff Kathrine Mackie said "Having regard to the gravity of these offences as a result of the cumulative effect of them, your extreme denial and complete absence of any remorse, and the assessment of risk, I have come to the conclusion that a custodial sentence is the only appropriate disposal. In my opinion, the repeated abuse and violent behaviour towards your three former wives and stepdaughter over a period of 28 years outweighs other factors." Within a few weeks, lawyers acting on his behalf appeared at the High Court in Edinburgh to appeal against a custodial sentence and this was quickly dismissed.

He was released from HM Prison Dumfries on 21 March 2014 under automatic early release rules after serving half of his sentence. On 17 April 2014 his appeal against his conviction was turned down.

== Personal life ==
He married long-term partner, June, shortly after his election as an MSP in 2011. After he was sent to prison, Walker apparently approached a Scottish publishing firm to see if they were interested in his autobiography; he was turned down. In September 2017, his autobiography was published and made available online under the title Bill Walker: My Story.
