= 2013 Dunfermline by-election =

Scottish Parliamentary election

- 24 October 2013

Dunfermline constituency
- Turnout: 42.7% (▼10.3 pp)
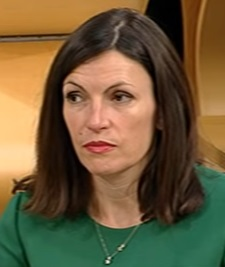

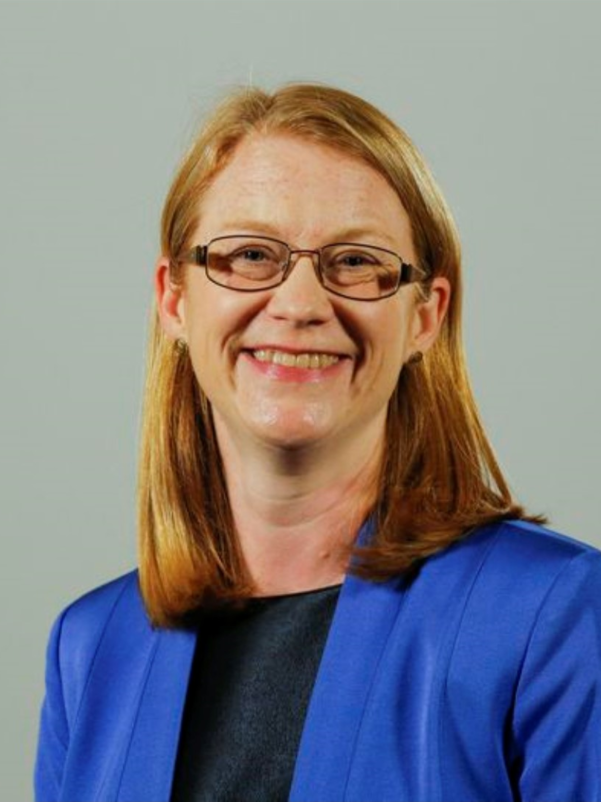
| | First party | Second party |
|---|---|---|
| Candidate | Cara Hilton | Shirley-Anne Somerville |
| Party | Labour | SNP |
| Popular vote | 10,279 | 7,402 |
| Percentage | 42.5% | 30.7% |
| Swing | ▲6.9 pp | ▼7.0 pp |
| | Third party | Fourth party |
| Candidate | Susan Leslie | James Reekie |
| Party | Liberal Democrats | Conservative |
| Popular vote | 2,852 | 2,009 |
| Percentage | 11.8% | 8.3% |
| Swing | ▼7.9 pp | ▲1.2 pp |
MSP before election
Bill Walker
SNP
Elected MSP
Cara Hilton
Labour

A 2013 by-election was held for the Scottish Parliament constituency of Dunfermline on 24 October 2013, following the resignation of its MSP, Bill Walker after he was convicted of 23 charges of assault.

It was won by Cara Hilton of the Labour Party, gaining the seat from the Scottish National Party (SNP).

== Background ==
Bill Walker was elected as a SNP candidate in the 2011 election. In March 2012 a Scottish newspaper, the Sunday Herald, claimed that his first three marriages had ended with allegations of violent behaviour towards his wives. The SNP suspended Walker in March, and then expelled him in April, for allegedly not declaring similar claims cited in uncontested divorce proceedings during their MSP vetting process.

On 22 August 2013, Walker was convicted of 23 offences of assault and one of breach of the peace in relation to three ex-wives and a stepdaughter, and sentencing was set for 20 September. The maximum sentence he could receive was 12 months, but only a longer sentence would see him automatically expelled from Parliament. This led to considerable political and media discussion about the situation; a majority of MSPs backed a motion calling on him to resign. As a result, Walker resigned on 7 September 2013. He was subsequently jailed for 12 months.

== Candidates ==
On 9 September, 22-year-old local resident James Reekie announced that he would stand as the Scottish Conservative candidate. He centred his campaign around job creation and regeneration of Dunfermline city centre.

The SNP announced Shirley-Anne Somerville as their candidate on 16 September 2013, having chosen her from a shortlist of two, defeating Fife councillor Karen Marjoram. At the time she was director of communities at Yes Scotland, the campaign group supporting Scottish independence in the 2014 Scottish independence referendum . Somerville failed to win a seat in the 2007 Scottish Parliament election, but was appointed as a Regional List MSP for the Lothians later in 2007 (following the resignation of another SNP MSP) and served until the 2011 election. Somerville and SNP party leader Alex Salmond apologised for Walker's tenure.

On 15 September 2013 Labour selected Cara Hilton, a councillor for Dunfermline South ward on Fife Council since May 2012. She defeated Fiona Yates and Fife councillor Lesley Laird, Labour having chosen an all-woman shortlist to improve the gender balance in the Scottish Parliament. Hilton is the daughter of former Labour MSP Cathy Peattie.

On 17 September, it was announced that UKIP would field Peter Adams, who lives in Fife and was treasurer of Kirkcaldy West Community Council.

The Liberal Democrats chose Susan Leslie as their candidate on 18 September, a university lecturer and a councillor on Fife Council for the Burntisland, Kinghorn, Auchtertool and Western Kirkcaldy ward, a seat she retained in the 2012 elections.

The Scottish Greens chose Zara Kitson, a 27-year-old pro-independence campaigner.

John Black, the leader of the Scottish Jacobite Party, was nominated as an independent.

Nominations closed on 23 September, with no further candidates nominated.

=== UKIP controversy ===
Adams was an elected member of the NHS Fife Board when he submitted his nomination, despite some interpretations of guidance being taken to mean board members cannot stand as candidates from the Scottish Parliament unless they resign. However, UKIP noted other guidance reading: "An elected member vacates office on becoming ... (d) a member of the Scottish Parliament ... As a result, it will not be necessary for such members who wish to stand for election to resign prior to doing so, but if they are elected, they will automatically and immediately cease to be a member of the NHS board." However, Adams resigned his board position after the issue came to light, and NHS Fife intended to reconvene meetings attended by Adams after his nomination. No complaint was registered with Police Scotland.

== Election campaign ==
A live debate between the SNP, Labour, Conservative, and Liberal Democrat candidates was aired by STV's Scotland Tonight programme on 14 October 2013. The debate drew "online criticism" for the absence of the Scottish Green Party's candidate.

The SNP, Labour, Conservative, Liberal Democrat, UKIP, and Scottish Green candidates took part in a televised debate on Newsnight Scotland on 21 October 2013, hosted by Gary Robertson.

== Result ==
Labour's Cara Hilton was elected, defeating the SNP's Shirley-Anne Somerville with a majority 2,800 votes (11.9%), overturning a previous SNP majority of 590 on a 6.9% swing. This was the first time ever that Labour had won a parliamentary seat from the SNP at a by-election.

In her victory speech, Hilton praised the courage of preceding MSP Bill Walker's ex-wives.

Scottish Parliament by-election, 2013: Dunfermline
| Party | Candidate | Votes | % | ±% |
|---|---|---|---|---|
| Labour | Cara Hilton | 10,279 | 42.5 | +6.9 |
| SNP | Shirley-Anne Somerville | 7,402 | 30.7 | −7.0 |
| Liberal Democrats | Susan Leslie | 2,852 | 11.8 | −7.9 |
| Conservative | James Reekie | 2,009 | 8.3 | +1.2 |
| UKIP | Peter Adams | 908 | 3.8 | New |
| Green | Zara Kitson | 593 | 2.5 | New |
| Independent | John Black | 161 | 0.7 | New |
| Majority | | 2,877 | 11.8 | N/A |
| Turnout | | 24,200 | 42.7 | −10.3 |
| Labour gain from SNP | | Swing | +6.9 | |

== Previous result ==
2011 Scottish Parliament election: Dunfermline
| Party | Candidate | Votes | % |
|---|---|---|---|
| SNP | Bill Walker | 11,010 | 37.6 |
| Labour | Alex Rowley | 10,420 | 35.6 |
| Liberal Democrats | Jim Tolson | 5,776 | 19.7 |
| Conservative | James Reekie | 2,093 | 7.1 |
| Majority | | 590 | 2.0 |
| Turnout | | 29,396 | 53.0 |
| SNP win (new seat) | | | |

== 2016 election ==
Labour's Cara Hilton stood for re-election in the 2016 election, however was ousted by Shirley-Anne Somerville, the SNP candidate whom she had previously defeated in the by-election.

2016 Scottish Parliament election: Dunfermline
| Party | Candidate | Votes | % | ±% |
|---|---|---|---|---|
| SNP | Shirley-Anne Somerville | 14,257 | 43.3 | +5.7 |
| Labour | Cara Hilton | 9,699 | 29.5 | −6.1 |
| Conservative | James Reekie | 5,797 | 17.6 | +10.5 |
| Liberal Democrats | James Calder | 3,156 | 9.6 | −10.1 |
| Majority | | 4,558 | 13.8 | +11.8 |
| Turnout | | 33,008 | 57.2 | +4.2 |
| SNP hold | | Swing | +5.9 | |
