= Social Security Directorate =

Directorate of the Scottish Government

The Social Security Directorate is a directorate of the Scottish Government responsible for social security policy in Scotland. The directorate ensures the smooth and secure transition of benefits that are to be devolved to the Scottish Parliament, amounting to £2.8 billion.

== Work of the directorate ==
As a result of work of the directorate, devolved powers were granted to the Scottish Parliament over social security policy in Scotland. In 2018, Social Security Scotland was formed.

== Composition ==
=== Cabinet secretaries ===
- Shirley-Anne Somerville, MSP Cabinet Secretary for Social Justice
- Joe FitzPatrick MSP, Minister for Local Government Empowerment and Planning

=== Management of the directorate ===
- Paul Johnston, Director-General Communities
- Stephen Kerr, Director of Social Security

== See also ==
- Social Security Scotland
- Scottish Government
- Directorates of the Scottish Government
