= SMI =

SMI may refer to:

== Business ==
- Service Measurement Index, for IT services
- Swiss Market Index, of the stock market

== Companies ==
- SensoMotoric Instruments, provider of eye tracking hard- and software
- Shepardson Microsystems, Atari 8-bit and Apple II software company
- SMI, brand of Silicon Motion ICs
- Speedway Motorsports (formerly Speedway Motorsports, Inc.), owner and operator of auto racing racetracks and related companies
- Shanghai Municipal Investment Group, China
- Sony Music India, Hindi music and film production company owned by Sony Music Entertainment

== Computing ==
- .smi, file extension for SAMI files
- Scalable Memory Interconnect interface in Intel Xeon E7 processors
- .smi, self mounting image file extension
- Structure of Management Information, in SNMP
- .smi, file extension for Synchronized Multimedia Integration Language
- SMI, system management interrupt for System Management Mode
- Serial Management Interface, to configure an Ethernet PHY

== Physics ==
- Vertico SMI or Vertico Spatially Modulated Illumination, a fast microscope

== Medical ==
- Serious mental illness

== Other uses ==
- Sergeant major instructor in the British Army
- Shape Modeling International, annual scientific symposium
- Social media intelligence
- Sports Management International, a fictional sports agency in the film Jerry Maguire
- St. Michael's Institution, a school in Malaysia
- Samos International Airport, Greece, IATA code
- Storage Management Initiative - Specification (SMI-S), a data storage standard
- Support for Mortgage Interest, a UK welfare benefit
- Sustainable Minerals Institute, a research institute at the University of Queensland, Australia
