= Jeane Freeman =

Scottish politician (1953–2026)

Jeane Freeman OBE
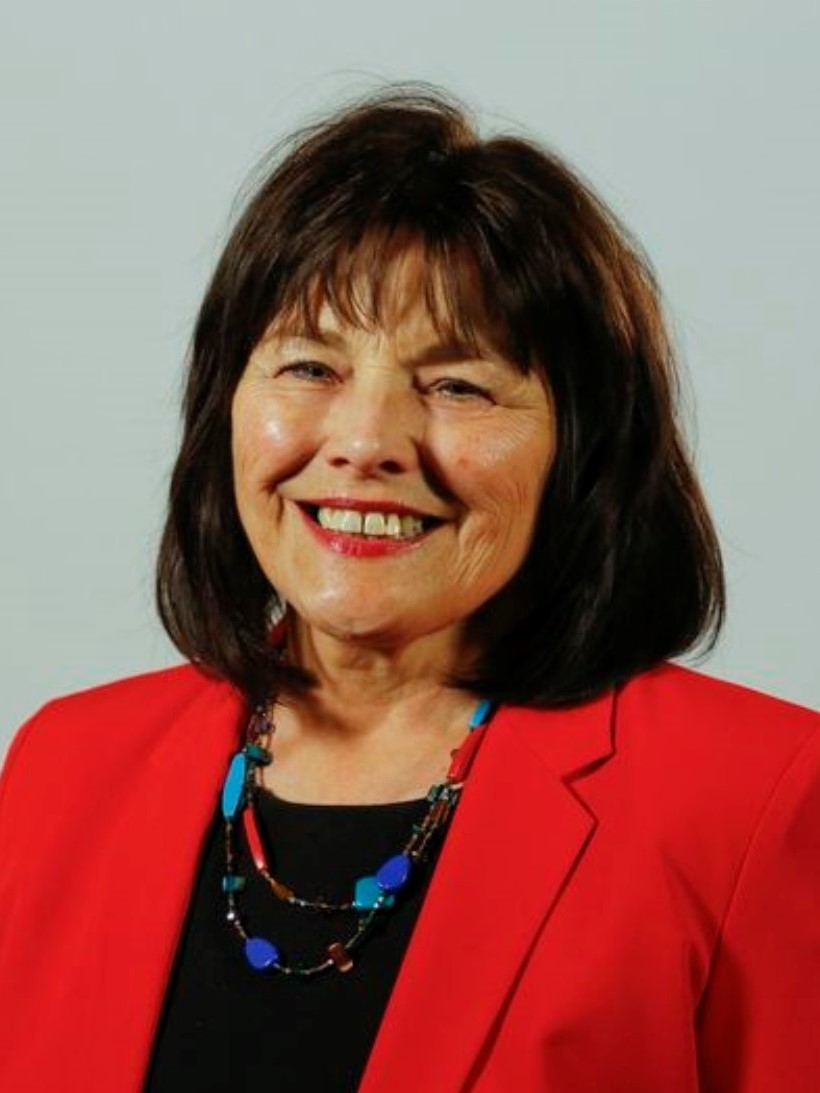
- Freeman in 2018

Cabinet Secretary for Health and Sport
- In office 28 June 2018 – 19 May 2021
- First Minister: Nicola Sturgeon
- Preceded by: Shona Robison
- Succeeded by: Humza Yousaf

Minister for Social Security
- In office 19 May 2016 – 28 June 2018
- First Minister: Nicola Sturgeon
- Preceded by: Office established
- Succeeded by: Christina McKelvie

Member of the Scottish Parliament for Carrick, Cumnock and Doon Valley
- In office 5 May 2016 – 5 May 2021
- Preceded by: Adam Ingram
- Succeeded by: Elena Whitham

Personal details
- Born: Jeane Tennent Freeman; September 1953 Ayr, Scotland
- Died: 7 February 2026 (aged 72) Govan, Glasgow, Scotland
- Party: Scottish National Party
- Other political affiliations: Communist; Labour
- Education: Glasgow College of Technology

Jeane Tennent Freeman (September 1953 – 7 February 2026) was a Scottish businesswoman and politician who served as Cabinet Secretary for Health and Sport from 2018 to 2021. A member of the Scottish National Party (SNP), she was the Member of the Scottish Parliament (MSP) for the Carrick, Cumnock and Doon Valley constituency from 2016 to 2021.

Born into a Labour-supporting, working-class family in South Ayrshire, Freeman attended the Glasgow College of Technology, studying sociology and politics. She became politically active at an early age and was a member of the Communist Party's student wing, before joining the Labour Party. In 1987, she established Apex Scotland, a criminal justice employment organisation, and was CEO until 2000. Freeman later was a political adviser to the Labour First Minister Jack McConnell from 2001 to 2005. In the run-up to the 2014 Scottish independence referendum, she and several other women, founded Women for Independence. Freeman campaigned in support for Scottish independence and in the aftermath of the Yes Scotland campaign's defeat in the referendum, she joined the Scottish National Party.

The following year Freeman was selected as the SNP's candidate for the Carrick, Cumnock and Doon Valley constituency in the 2016 Scottish Parliament election. She was elected to the 5th Scottish Parliament and was subsequently appointed to a junior ministerial post as Minister for Social Security. In this role, she worked alongside the Cabinet Secretary for Communities, Social Security and Equalities to establish Social Security Scotland, which claims as her "greatest achievement". Following a 2018 cabinet reshuffle of the Second Sturgeon government, Freeman was promoted to the Scottish Cabinet as Cabinet Secretary for Health and Sport. During Freeman's tenure as the Scottish Health Secretary, she played a vital role in Scotland's response to the COVID-19 pandemic. She led press briefings to the public, was criticised for handling of care homes and announced Scotland's preparation plan for delivering COVID-19 vaccines. In 2020, she announced her intention to step down as an MSP, therefore relinquishing her role as Health Secretary.

== Early life ==
Jeane Tennent Freeman was born in Ayr in September 1953. She was raised in South Ayrshire with her two brothers, to a trade union, Labour supporting family. Her mother was a nurse and her father, son of an immigrant family, was an aircraft fitter and was in the RAF during WWII. After coming back from war, he was determined to create social justice, something that Freeman aspired to continue from her father.

She was educated at Ayr Academy and from 1975 to 1979, she attended the Glasgow College of Technology, studying sociology and politics. Freeman also trained to be a nurse and went on to earn a degree.

Freeman was a leading member of the Communist Party's student wing and in 1979 she became the first woman to chair the National Union of Students Scotland. In 1983 Freeman was a member of the Communist party's Congress Arrangements Committee which oversaw the running of that year's party congress.

== Early career ==
In 1987, Freeman established Apex Scotland, a criminal justice employment organisation for which she was chief executive for twelve years. She was appointed a member of the Parole Board for Scotland in 2006 and also played roles on the Scottish Police Services Authority Board. She was appointed a Lay Member to the Judicial Appointments Board for Scotland, commencing November 2011 for a four-year period.

In 2008 she was appointed to the board of the National Waiting Times Centre, the special health board that runs the Golden Jubilee National Hospital. In January 2015 she was reappointed the Chair of the National Waiting Times Centre Board. In March 2016 she stepped down from this role.

In the 2013/14 financial year Freeman worked for a number of bodies, including Police Scotland, the NHS National Waiting Time Centre and the Judicial Appointments Board for Scotland. She billed taxpayers for 376 days work – leading her to be dubbed 'the Quango Queen' in the press. A spokesman for Freeman said, "A contracted day does not mean sitting in an office – indeed, many boards meet during the evening. It is entirely routine for members of public boards to have a number of other interests."

== Early political career ==
=== Senior political adviser ===
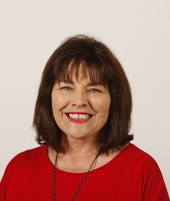
Official parliamentary portrait, 2016

Freeman later joined the Scottish Labour Party and was a member until the late 1990s. Between 2001 and 2005, Freeman was a senior political adviser to First Minister Jack McConnell. In this role, she worked on the Scottish Budget, the government's legislative programme, relations with the UK government, and in the Finance, Health and Justice portfolios. She left the position voluntarily, though there were reports of a row between Freeman and John Elvidge, which were dismissed by the Scottish Executive. Months after she left, the Scottish Executive hired her consultancy firm, Freeman Associates, in a consultancy capacity, generating accusations of cronyism.

=== 2014 Scottish independence referendum ===
As a member of Scottish Labour, Freeman had never supported Scottish independence. Her experience of working in the Scottish Executive, became an option "worth considering". Freeman was active in the campaign for Scottish independence since the announcement of the 2014 Scottish independence referendum. In May 2012 it was announced that she was a part of Yes Scotland. She was a founding member of Women for Independence and spoke at a meeting of the Labour for Independence group. During the referendum campaign she made appearances on television programmes as a commentator.

=== Member of the Scottish Parliament; 2016 to 2021 ===
==== Election to Holyrood ====
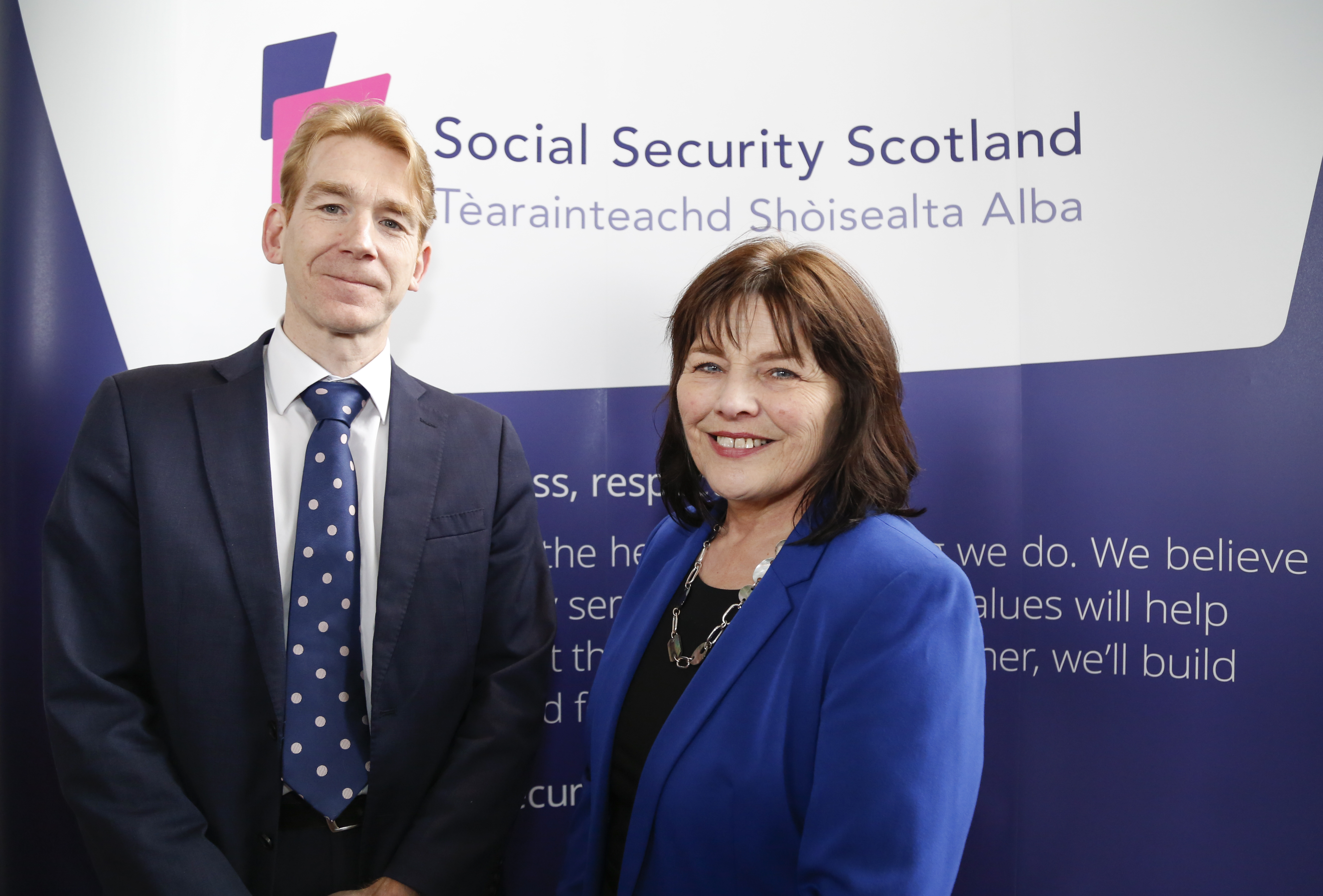
Freeman played a role in setting up Social Security Scotland as a junior minister

In November 2014, when the SNP voted in favour of allowing non-members to stand as their candidates in the general elections, Nicola Sturgeon named Freeman as an example of the sort of person that might be chosen by a constituency branch. In August 2015, Freeman was selected to be the SNP candidate for the Carrick, Cumnock and Doon Valley constituency in the 2016 Scottish elections.

In April 2016, former Labour politician Brian Wilson covered the topic of Freedom of information (FOI) requests in his column in The Scotsman, observing that her company Freeman Associates had recently been the subject of a request to the Scottish Government. The Ministers had responded to the applicant that the cost of replying to this specific request would exceed £600 and they were therefore not obliged to comply. Following a review, the applicant remained dissatisfied and applied to the Information Commissioner for a decision.

Freeman was elected as the Member of the Scottish Parliament (MSP) for Carrick, Cumnock and Doon Valley at the 2016 Scottish Parliament election.

==== Junior minister ====
In May 2016, she was appointed a junior minister post in the Second Sturgeon government as Minister for Social Security. As the inaugural holder, she worked alongside Angela Constance, the Cabinet Secretary for Communities, Social Security and Equalities, to help establish Social Security Scotland, with Scotland's new social security powers from Westminster. Freeman stated: “It was a real privilege to help lay the foundations for a social security service, and I use the word service because we are about dignity and respect and I was immensely proud to do that.”

== Scottish Health Secretary (2018–2021) ==
In a cabinet reshuffle by First Minister Nicola Sturgeon, she was appointed Cabinet Secretary for Health and Sport on 26 June 2018. As Health Secretary she played a big part in the Scottish Government's response to the COVID-19 pandemic.

=== Glasgow hospital infection crisis ===
In 2019, Freeman faced calls for her resignation following ten cases of infections linked to water contamination at the Queen Elizabeth University Hospital. NHS Greater Glasgow and Clyde later reported two deaths of children, who had been linked to infection from the hospital. When asked if she would resign on an interview with the BBC, she stated: "No I'm not because my focus is on fixing these matters and restoring public confidence. That's the right thing for me to do."

==== Death threat ====
In February 2020, Freeman was forced to up her security presence amid death threats against her. The threats were in relation to the Glasgow hospital infection crisis and Police Scotland had charged a man. She told Holyrood Magazine: “I think the threats are a symptom of this notion that I am personally responsible for everything that happens. I cannot be personally responsible, but I am accountable for how well our health service performs and how well I act to resolve those areas where it’s not doing as it should do."

=== COVID-19 pandemic response ===
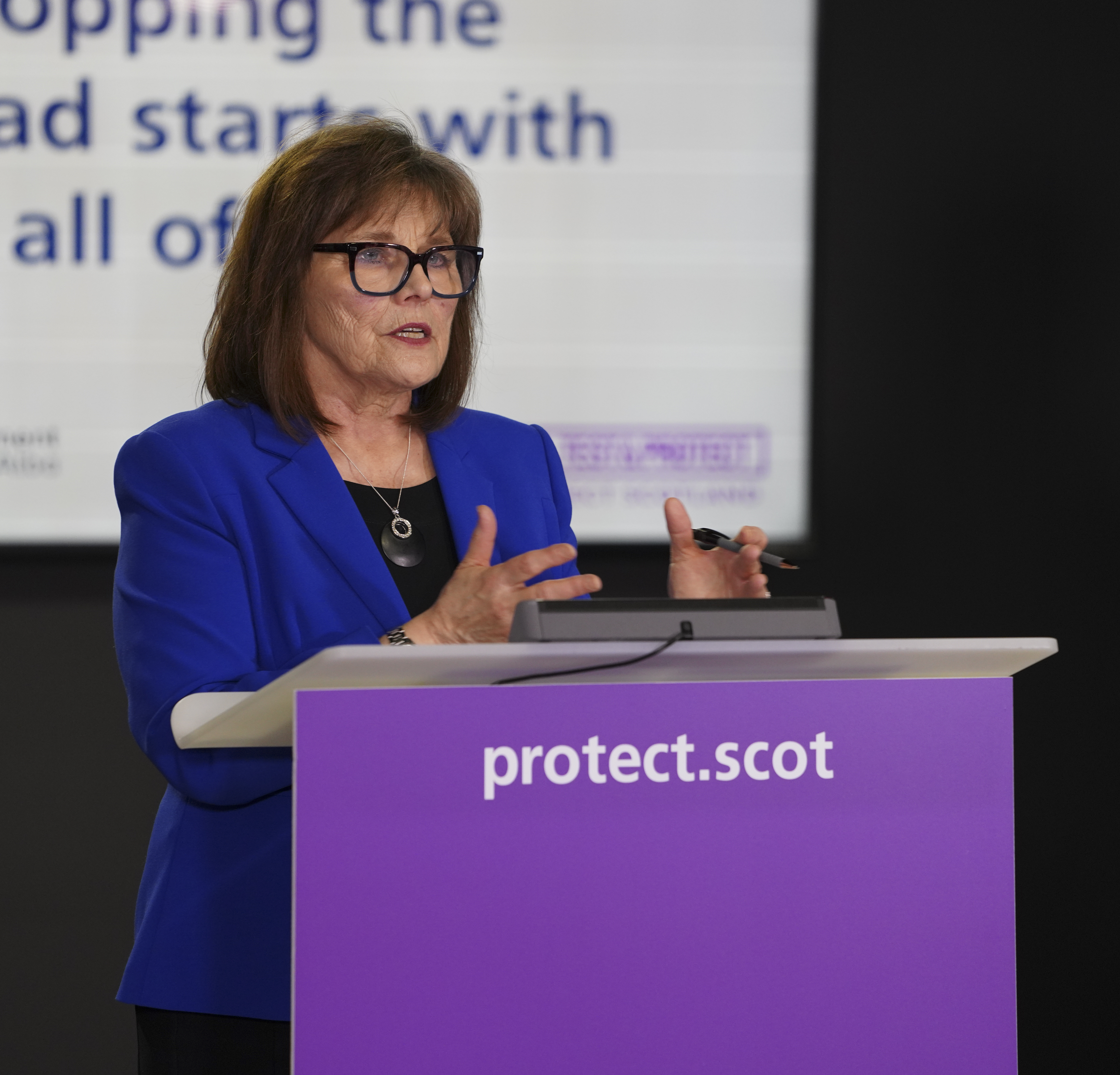
Freeman leading a Scottish Government press conference on Coronavirus

Freeman served as Health Secretary during the COVID-19 pandemic in Scotland and briefed the public in press conferences. In April 2020, she said in a statement in the Scottish Parliament a network of COVID-19 local assessment centres was to be set up across Scotland with 50 planned in the first wave. A network of "humanitarian assistance centres" were also set up, working with GPs and other local partners to arrange delivery of medicine, care services and grocery delivery.

==== COVID-19 vaccination programme ====
In November 2020, Freeman delivered a statement to the Scottish Parliament on vaccines. She announced that Scotland was ready to administer the first vaccine for COVID-19 in the first week in February, if the vaccine is given safety clearance. Freeman also announced the priorities list for the first wave of vaccinations, which ran from December to February 2021. The priorities are: “frontline health and social care staff, older residents in care homes, care home staff, all those aged 80 and over, unpaid carers and personal assistants & those delivering the vaccination.”

==== Care home deaths ====
During the pandemic, 1,300 elderly patients were transferred into care homes without receiving a negative coronavirus test result. Many had the disease and ended up passing the virus onto other care home residents. Over three thousand care home residents died from coronavirus; in some care homes dozens of pensioners died – contributing significantly to Scotland recording one of the highest death tolls in Europe. Gary Smith, Scotland secretary of the GMB, said the policy turned “care homes into morgues” and in March 2021 Freeman admitted to the BBC: "We [the Scottish Government] didn’t take the right precautions to make sure that older people leaving hospital going into care homes were as safe as they could be and that was a mistake." After leaving office Freeman said that the characterisation of the policy as a "death sentence" for the elderly had hurt her personally and that the criticism from opposition parties was "not fair" although the criticism continued with many observers considering her decisions leading to many deaths of the elderly in care home, for which Operation Koper is investigating.

On 24 August 2020, Freeman confirmed that she would not recontest her seat at the 2021 Scottish Parliament election.

== After parliament ==
In 2022, Freeman was appointed an honorary professor at Queen Margaret University (QMU).

== Death ==
Freeman died at the Queen Elizabeth University Hospital in Glasgow, on 7 February 2026, at the age of 72. She had been diagnosed with terminal cancer less than four weeks prior. Tributes were paid by First Minister John Swinney as well as former First Ministers Jack McConnell and Nicola Sturgeon; the latter describing Freeman as amongst her "best and closest" friends. She had a private cremation, followed by a Service of Thanksgiving held on the afternoon of Saturday 28 February 2026 at the University of Glasgow's Bute Hall. Among those attending were politicians, including John Swinney, Anas Sarwar and close friend Mike Russell; and others including Sally Magnusson, Elaine C Smith, Ricky Ross and Brian Taylor.

== Awards and honours ==
In the 1996 Birthday Honours, she was awarded an OBE for her services to the rehabilitation of offenders.

== Personal life ==
Her life partner was Susan Stewart, they had been together 25 years at the time of Freeman's death. Stewart was Director of the Open University in Scotland.
