= Funeral Support Payment =

Scottish government benefit

Funeral Support Payment is a benefit delivered by Social Security Scotland. The benefit is aimed at reducing funeral poverty in Scotland by providing people who receive certain benefits or tax credits with a payment that can be used to help pay funeral costs, burial or cremation costs, travel costs, and medical costs.

The amount of each payment is dependent upon which local authority the person who died resided in. If the person who died left any money or had an insurance policy, this can also impact the total amount paid.

== Origin ==
Social Security Scotland was established in April 2018 following the Social Security (Scotland) Act 2018. Social Security Scotland delivers certain areas of social security policy that was devolved to the Scottish Parliament after the Scotland Act 2016.

== Funeral Support Payment ==
On 16 September 2019, Funeral Support Payment replaced the UK's funeral payment in Scotland. The benefit widened the eligibility of the UK's funeral payment, allowing more people to apply for it. It also increased the flat rate of the payment to take into account inflation.

== Eligibility ==
To be eligible for Funeral Support Payment, the person applying must be in receipt of one of the following benefits:

- Universal Credit
- Child Tax Credit
- Working Tax Credit
- Income Support
- Pension Credit
- Housing Benefit
- Income-based Jobseekers Allowance (JSA)
- Income-related Employment and Support Allowance (ESA)

The person applying for the payment must also be responsible for the costs of the funeral. Further to this, the person who died must have lived in the UK and the application can be made from their date of death, up to 6 months after the funeral.
