= Best Start Grant =

Best Start Grant is a package of benefits in Scotland delivered by Social Security Scotland. Best Start Grant is made up of three payments: Pregnancy and Baby Payment, Early Learning Payment, and School Age Payment. Best Start Foods is also under the Best Start Grant umbrella. The benefits are aimed at providing parents or carers who receive certain benefits or tax credits with extra financial support during key stages of a child's life.

== Origin ==
Social Security Scotland was established in April 2018 following the Social Security (Scotland) Act 2018. Social Security Scotland delivers certain areas of social security policy that was devolved to the Scottish Parliament after the Scotland Act 2016.

== Pregnancy and Baby Payment ==
In December 2018, Pregnancy and Baby Payment replaced the Sure Start Maternity Grant in Scotland. The change also expanded the benefit and extended the eligibility of the benefit.

The payment is £707.25 for a first child and £353.65 for each child thereafter, with no limit on the number of children that can be claimed for. Parents can apply from 24 weeks of pregnancy up until the day the baby is 6 months old. This is extended to up to 1 year old if the responsibility for the child has changed, such as in cases of adoption or kinship care.

== Early Learning Payment ==
Early Learning Payment is a new payment with no UK equivalent that became available in April 2019. It is a payment of £294.70 to the parent or carer of a child who is between 2 and 3½ years old. The aim of the payment is to assist with the costs of early learning, such as nursery.

== School Age Payment ==
School Age Payment is a new payment with no UK equivalent that became available in June 2019. It is a payment of £294.70. The aim of the payment is to help with the costs of a child entering school. Parents can apply for the payment around the time their child would normally start primary school. The eligibility window for payments is dependent upon the child's date of birth and applications need to be made within an exact time frame.

If a child was born between 1 March 2018 and 28 February 2019, parents need to apply for the payment between 1 June 2023 and 29 February 2024. If a child was born between 1 March 2019 and 29 February 2020, parents will need to apply next year, between 1 June 2024 and 28 February 2025.

== Best Start Foods ==
Best Start Foods replaced the UK Healthy Start on 12 August 2019. Like Pregnancy and Baby Payment, the new benefit was expanded and the eligibility was extended. All pregnant women under the age of 18 and pregnant women receiving certain benefits can apply for Best Start Foods.

The payment is £4.95 per week for pregnant women and for children aged one to three years old. For children under one year old, the payment is £9.90 per week. The Scottish Government has expanded the foods that families can purchase through the Best Start Foods payment, including; eggs, fruit, vegetables, pulses and milk. The Scottish Government replaced the paper vouchers with a new smartcard system. Under this system, smartcards are pre-loaded every four weeks, with families using them having more control over the value they spend.

== Eligibility ==
To be eligible for any of the Best Start Grant payments, parents or carers need to be in receipt of one of the following benefits:

- Universal Credit
- Child Tax Credit
- Working Tax Credit
- Income Support
- Pension Credit
- Housing Benefit
- Income-based Jobseekers Allowance (JSA)
- Income-related Employment and Support Allowance (ESA)

People under 18 years old do not need to receive a benefit to be eligible for Best Start Grant. Similarly, people who are 18 or 19 years old who do not receive any benefits can be eligible if they are listed on their parent or carer's Child Tax Credit, Child Benefit, or Universal Credit child payment award.
