= Sure Start Maternity Grant =

Welfare payment in the UK

Sure Start Maternity Grant is a welfare payment in the United Kingdom. It is a one-off payment of £500 to help with the costs of having a child and it is available to those in receipt of certain benefits. In Scotland, Sure Start Maternity Grant has been replaced by Best Start Grant, a new package of benefits delivered by Social Security Scotland.
