= Adam Ingram (SNP politician) =

Scottish politician (born 1951)

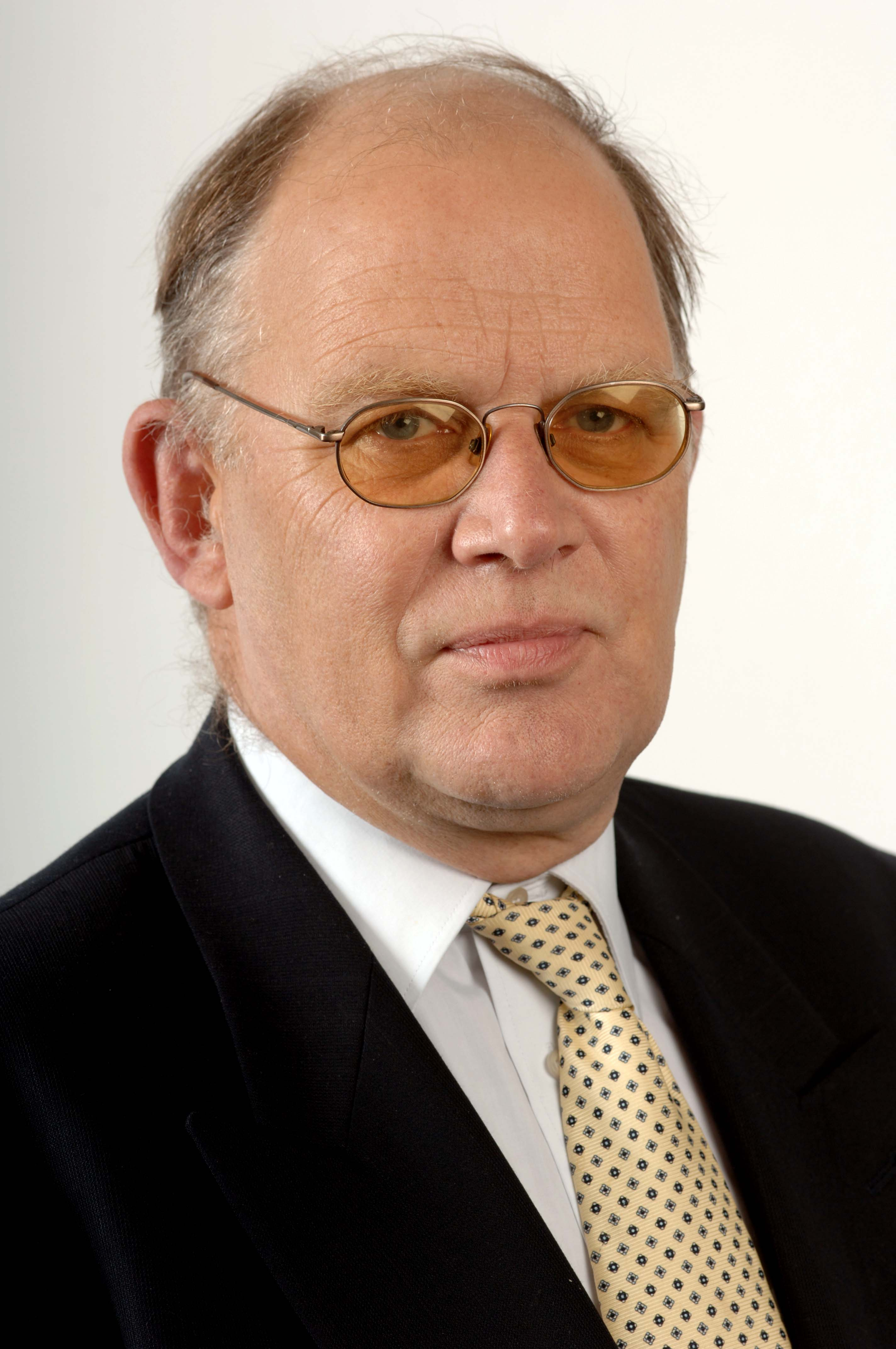
- Ingram in 2011

Minister for Children and Early Years
- In office 17 May 2007 – 25 May 2011
- First Minister: Alex Salmond
- Preceded by: Office established
- Succeeded by: Angela Constance

Member of the Scottish Parliament for Carrick, Cumnock and Doon Valley
- In office 5 May 2011 – 24 March 2016
- Preceded by: Cathy Jamieson
- Succeeded by: Jeane Freeman

Member of the Scottish Parliament for South of Scotland (1 of 7 Regional MSPs)
- In office 6 May 1999 – 22 March 2011

Personal details
- Born: 1 May 1951 (age 75) Kilmarnock, Scotland
- Party: Scottish National Party
- Children: 4
- Profession: Economist
- Website: web.archive.org/web/20150801040406/http://adamingrammsp.com/

Adam Hamilton Ingram (born 1 May 1951) is a Scottish politician who was a Scottish National Party (SNP) Member of the Scottish Parliament (MSP) from 1999 to 2016. He was first a MSP for the South of Scotland region from 1999 to 2011, then the MSP for the Carrick, Cumnock and Doon Valley constituency from 2011 to 2016.

== Early life ==
Ingram was born on 1 May 1951 in Kilmarnock, Scotland. He was an economist before becoming a parliamentarian, and had been the SNP's national organiser.

== Electoral record ==
Ingram stood as a candidate in the Carrick, Cumnock and Doon Valley constituency in the first four Scottish Parliament elections. In the first three elections he lost to Labour's Cathy Jamieson but was elected as a list MSP for the South of Scotland region each time in 1999, 2003 and 2007. He was elected to the constituency in the 2011 election with a majority of 2,581 votes over his nearest rival, Richard Leonard, future Leader of the Scottish Labour Party.

== Positions held ==
Ingram was a shadow deputy minister from 2000 onwards, with responsibility for Children and Early Education from 2004. After the SNP formed a minority government in 2007, Ingram was the Scottish Government's Minister for Children and Early Years until 2011.

Scottish Parliament
Preceded by Cathy Jamieson	Member of the Scottish Parliament for Carrick, Cumnock and Doon Valley; 2011–2016	Succeeded by Jeane Freeman
Political offices
New office	Minister for Children and Early Years; 2007–2011	Succeeded by Angela Constance as Minister for Children and Young People
