= Karen Gillon =

Scottish Labour Party politician

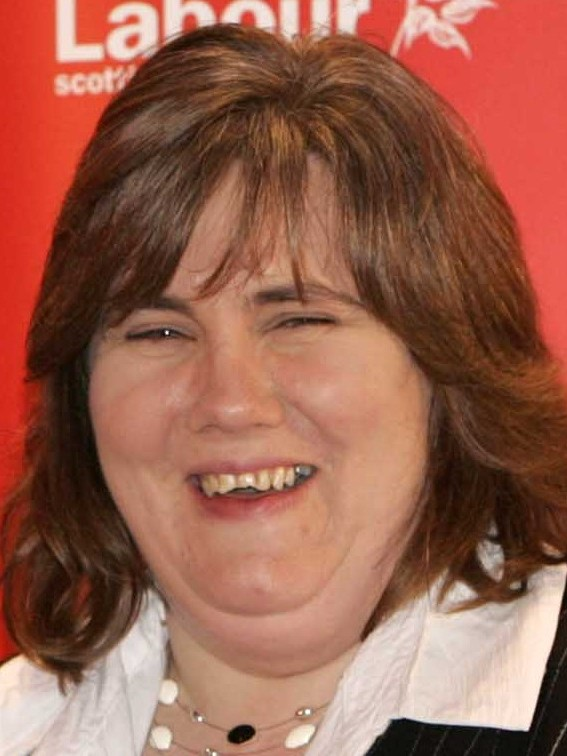
- Gillon in 2011

Member of the Scottish Parliament for Clydesdale
- In office 6 May 1999 – 22 March 2011
- Preceded by: Constituency established
- Succeeded by: Aileen Campbell

Personal details
- Born: Karen Macdonald Turnbull; 18 August 1967 (age 59) Jedburgh, Scotland
- Party: Scottish Labour
- Spouse: James Gillon (m. 1999)
- Children: 3

Karen Macdonald Gillon (née Turnbull; born 18 August 1967) is a Scottish Labour Party politician who served as Member of the Scottish Parliament (MSP) for the constituency of Clydesdale from 1999 to 2011.

== Early life and career ==
Gillon was born in 1967 in Edinburgh to Edith Turnbull. She was educated at the state comprehensive Jedburgh Grammar School before going on to study at the University of Birmingham. Before entering politics, she worked in community education. From 1997 until 1999, she served as personal assistant to Helen Liddell MP.

== Political career ==
Gillon was elected in the 1999 Scottish Parliament election, taking 16,755 votes (43.02%). She was re elected in 2003 with 14,800 votes (46.62%) and in 2007 with 13,835 votes (41.5%). She served as Labour's spokesperson on rural development until her defeat in 2011.

Gillon was co-chair of the Cross Party Group on Malawi and worked with civic society across Scotland and in the constituency of Clydesdale, to develop better links between the two countries. She was defeated in the 2011 Scottish Parliament election by the candidate from the SNP, Aileen Campbell, by 4,216 votes (14.1%).

== Personal life ==
Gillon is married to James Gillon with whom she has two sons and one daughter. Gillon is a Christian and has described the Beatitudes as the best example in the Bible of turning prayer into action.

Scottish Parliament
| New constituency | Member of the Scottish Parliament for Clydesdale; 1999–2011 | Succeeded by Aileen Campbell |
