= Aileen Campbell =

Scottish National Party politician

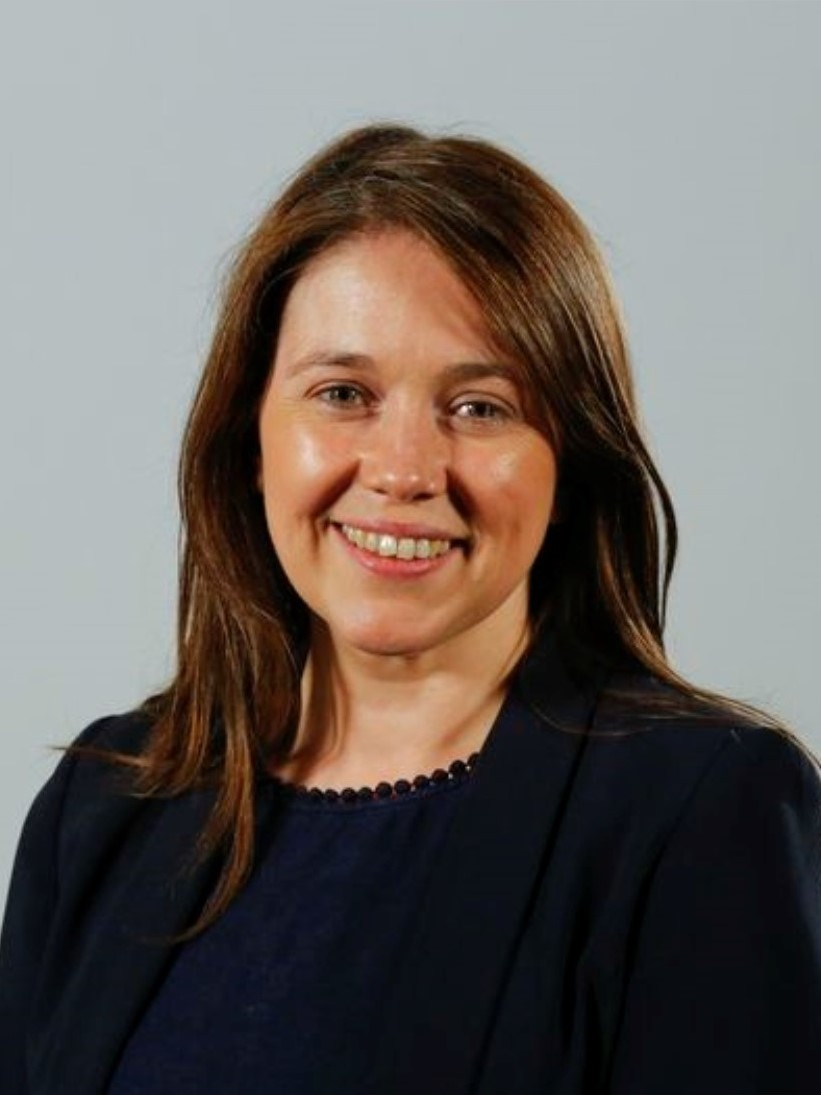
- Official portrait, 2018

Cabinet Secretary for Communities and Local Government
- In office 26 June 2018 – 19 May 2021
- First Minister: Nicola Sturgeon
- Preceded by: Angela Constance
- Succeeded by: Shona Robison
Junior ministerial offices
Minister for Public Health and Sport
In office 18 May 2016 – 26 June 2018
First Minister	Nicola Sturgeon
Preceded by	Maureen Watt
Succeeded by	Joe FitzPatrick
Minister for Children and Young People
In office 6 December 2011 – 18 May 2016
First Minister	Alex Salmond; Nicola Sturgeon
Deputy	Fiona McLeod
Preceded by	Angela Constance
Succeeded by	Mark McDonald
Minister for Local Government and Planning
In office 25 May 2011 – 6 December 2011
First Minister	Alex Salmond
Preceded by	Office established
Succeeded by	Derek Mackay
Parliamentary offices
Member of the Scottish Parliament for Clydesdale
In office 5 May 2011 – 5 May 2021
Preceded by	Karen Gillon
Succeeded by	Màiri McAllan
Member of the Scottish Parliament for South of Scotland (1 of 7 Regional MSPs)
In office 3 May 2007 – 22 March 2011

Personal details
- Born: 18 May 1980 (age 46) Perth, Scotland
- Party: Scottish National Party
- Spouse: Graham Fraser White
- Children: 2
- Education: University of Glasgow

Aileen Elizabeth Campbell (born 18 May 1980) is a Scottish football administrator and former politician who has served as the chief executive of Scottish Women's Football since 2021. A member of the Scottish National Party, she was a Member of the Scottish Parliament (MSP) for fourteen years and was a Scottish Government minister for ten, having served on the Scottish Cabinet as Cabinet Secretary for Communities and Local Government, from 2018 to 2021.

Born and raised in Perth, Campbell is a politics and history graduate of the University of Glasgow. She served as the National Convenor of the SNP's youth wing from 2005 to 2006, and was an editor for the Keystone magazine. Before becoming an elected official, she worked for politicians like Nicola Sturgeon, Shona Robison and Stewart Hosie. In the 2007 Scottish Parliament election, she stood as the SNP's candidate for the Clydesdale constituency, but came second. Although she failed to win, Campbell was elected as an additional member for the South of Scotland region. In the 2011 election, she defeated Scottish Labour's Karen Gillon in Clydesdale.

After Campbell's re-election to the Scottish Parliament, she was appointed a junior minister in the Scottish Government as Minister for Local Government and Planning, a post she held for seven months. From 2011 to 2016, she served as Minister for Children and Young People. In December 2014, she became the first person to take maternity leave while serving as a minister in government. After being re-elected in 2016, Campbell was appointed the role of Minister for Public Health and Sport. In 2018, following a cabinet reshuffle, Campbell was promoted to Cabinet and served as Cabinet Secretary for Communities and Local Government. In March 2020, she announced her intention to step down as an MSP, therefore relinquishing her role in government.

== Early life ==
Campbell was born on 18 May 1980 in Perth, Scotland. She grew up on her parents' tenant farm in Perthshire and was educated at Collace Primary School and Perth Academy. She studied Politics and History at the University of Glasgow. From 2005−06 Campbell was national convener of the SNP youth wing, the Young Scots for Independence. Since graduating, she has worked as editor of construction magazine Keystone and was editorial assistant on a short-lived pro-independence newspaper, the Scottish Standard. Before her election to Parliament, Campbell also worked for Nicola Sturgeon and as a researcher for Shona Robison and Stewart Hosie.

== Member of the Scottish Parliament ==
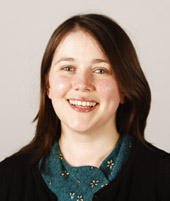
Official parliamentary portrait, 2011

At the 2007 Scottish Parliament election, Campbell was the SNP candidate for the Clydesdale constituency where she finished second but was subsequently elected as an additional member for the South of Scotland region due to her being fifth on the SNP's regional list.

Campbell suffered a minor injury on 23 January 2008, receiving medical treatment at Edinburgh Royal Infirmary before returning to the parliament for a vote. The vote was won by 64 votes to 62.

In early 2009, Campbell launched the "Play it again" scheme with the Scottish Arts Council and others to encourage people across Scotland to donate their unwanted and unloved musical instruments to be passed on to children across the country to give them the opportunity to enjoy the benefits of music. Campbell was nominated for Real Radio's "Best New Scottish Politician 2009 Award".

Campbell was elected as MSP for Clydesdale on 5 May 2011 after receiving an 8.9% swing from Labour, giving her a majority of 4,216.

She served as Minister for Local Government and Planning from 25 May 2011 until 6 December 2011. when she was moved to the position of Minister for Children and Young People. On 18 December 2014, Campbell began maternity leave and Fiona McLeod acted as Minister for Children and Young People until Campbell returned on 1 September 2015. This was the first time that a Minister of the Scottish Government had taken maternity leave.

In the 2016 election she was re-elected as the MSP for Clydesdale with an increased majority.

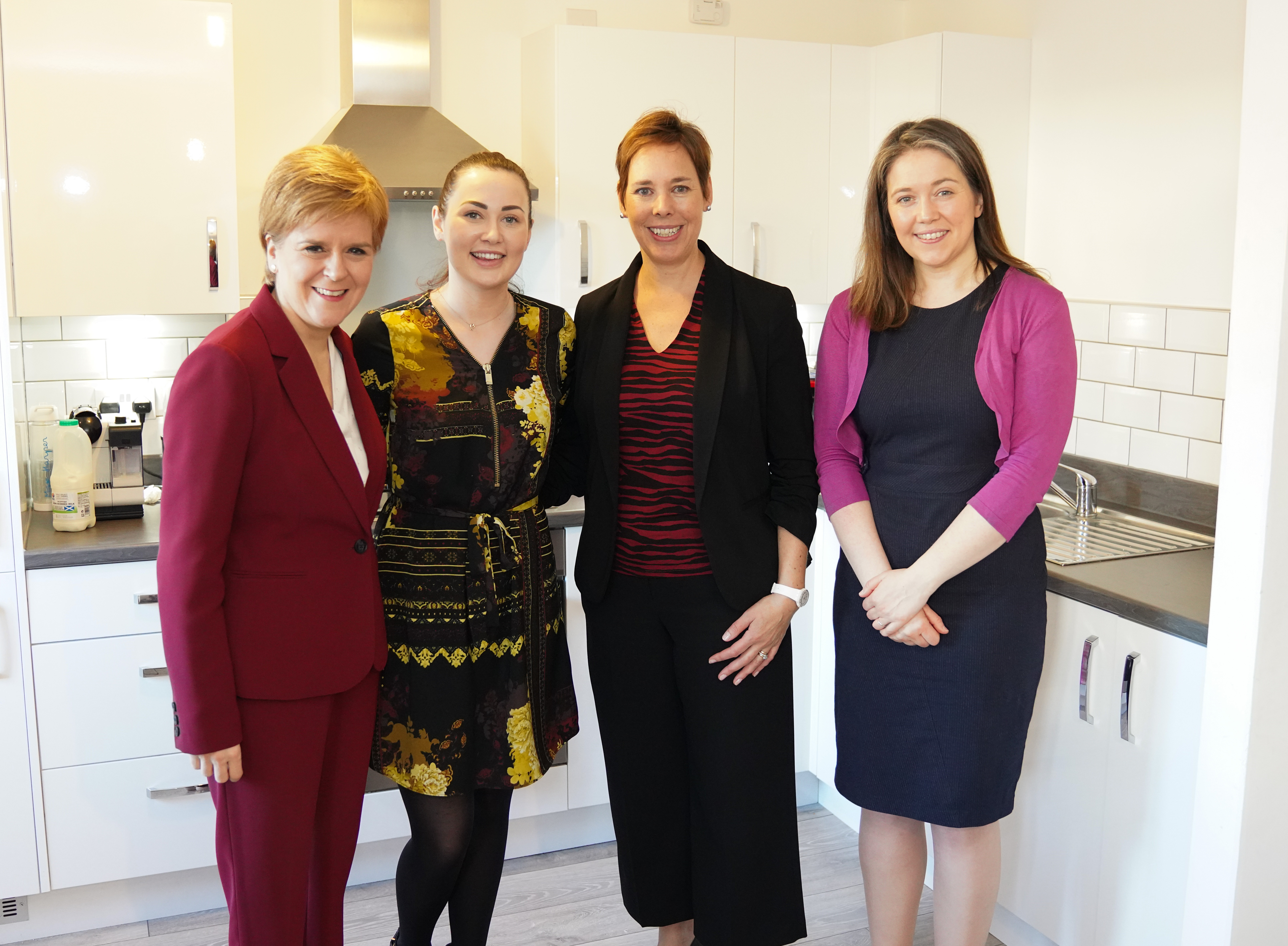
Help to buy a home, Nicola Sturgeon, Louisa Harper, Nicola Barclay and Campbell.

On 18 May 2016 she was moved to the post of Minister for Public Health and Sport in a reshuffle. That year, drug-related deaths in Scotland increased to 867, 23% more than the previous year's figures. Campbell stated the increase was part of a trend seen across the UK and Europe. Before her appointment, government funding for drug and alcohol rehabilitation programmes was cut by 22%. At the time, Scottish Drugs Forum Chief Executive David Liddell said he was concerned that the cuts had "the potential to increase harm and drug-related deaths." The cuts were criticized by opposition parties.

She was made Cabinet Secretary for Communities and Local Government on 26 June 2018. Following her elevation to the cabinet The Times reported that her promotion, "has bemused many. It was on her watch that the named person legislation, which has caused the SNP so much trouble, was introduced, while her record on drugs policy is regarded by many inside the party as deplorable."

In February 2020 Campbell wrote to MSPs voicing concerns about a Labour party proposal to provide women and trans men in Scotland with free sanitary products. Campbell said the Scottish Government had “grave concerns” over the plans' “deliverability” and cost. She also said she was worried about "people outside Scotland seeking access to the products".

On 8 March 2020, she announced that she would step down at the next election to spend more time with her family.

== Football ==
After leaving politics, Campbell was appointed as chief executive of Scottish Women's Football, the governing body of women's football in Scotland, in August 2021. On her first day in the role, she had to deal with the withdrawal of Forfar Farmington F.C. from the Scottish Women's Premier League.

== Personal life ==
Campbell married Graham Fraser White in Collace Kirk, Perthshire, on 15 August 2009.

== See also ==
- Government of the 3rd Scottish Parliament
- Government of the 4th Scottish Parliament

Scottish Parliament
Preceded by Karen Gillon	Member of the Scottish Parliament for Clydesdale; 2011–2021	Succeeded by Màiri McAllan
