= Clydesdale (Scottish Parliament constituency) =

Constituency of the Scottish Parliament

- County constituency for the Scottish Parliament
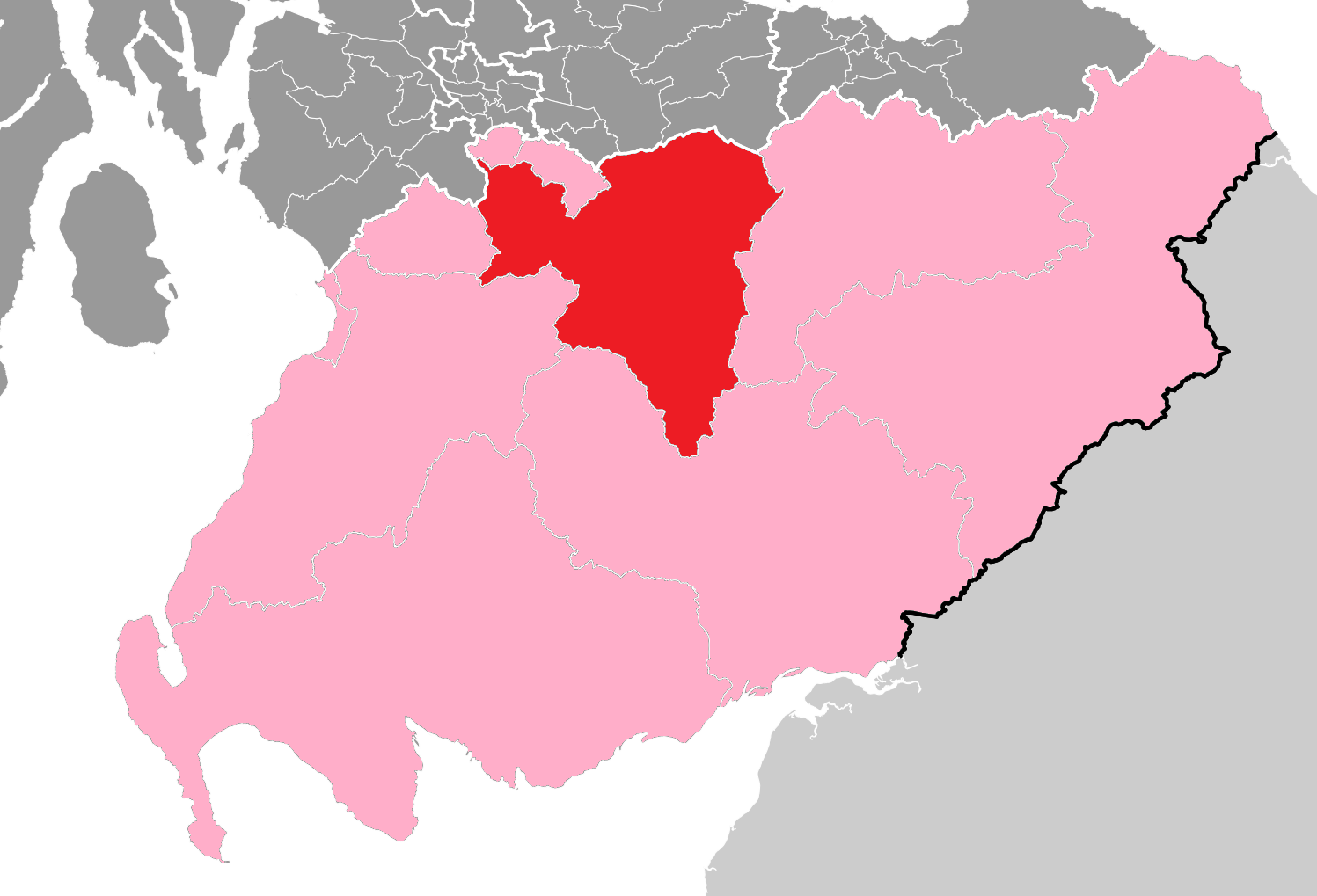

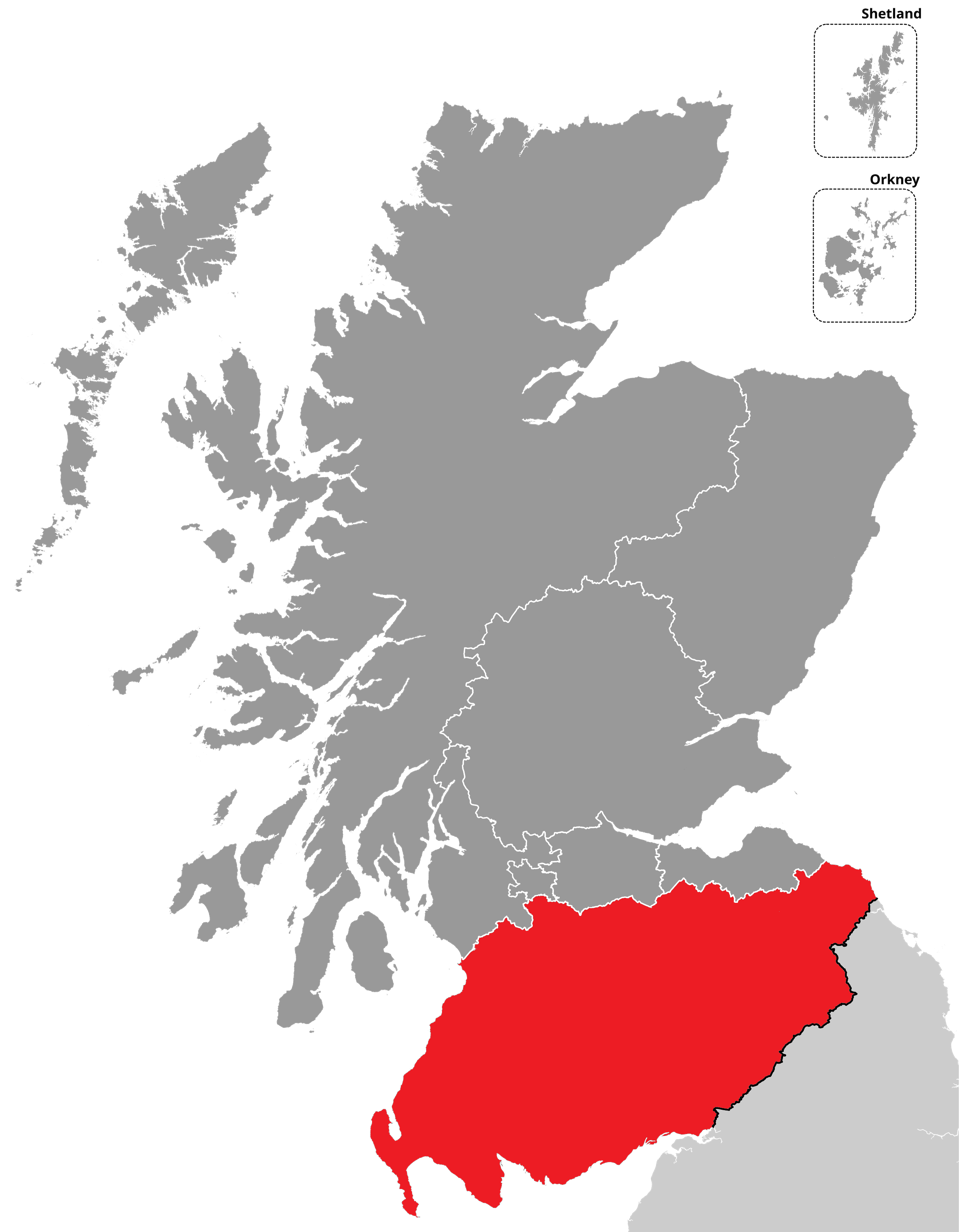
- Clydesdale shown within the South Scotland electoral region, and the region shown within Scotland
- Electoral region: South Scotland
- Electorate: 63,343 (2026)

Current constituency
- Created: 1999
- Party: Scottish National Party
- MSP: Màiri McAllan
- Council area: South Lanarkshire

Clydesdale (Gaelic: Dail Chluaidh) is a county constituency of the Scottish Parliament covering part of the council area of South Lanarkshire. Under the additional-member electoral system used for elections to the Scottish Parliament, it elects one Member of the Scottish Parliament (MSP) by the first past the post method of election. It is also one of ten constituencies in the South Scotland electoral region, which elects seven additional members, in addition to the ten constituency MSPs, to produce a form of proportional representation for the region as a whole.

The seat has been held by Màiri McAllan of the Scottish National Party since the 2021 Scottish Parliament election.

== Electoral region ==
Following the second periodic review of Scottish Parliament boundaries in 2025, the other nine constituencies of the South Scotland region are: Ayr; Carrick, Cumnock and Doon Valley; Dumfriesshire; East Kilbride; Ettrick, Roxburgh and Berwickshire; Galloway and West Dumfries; Hamilton, Larkhall and Stonehouse; Kilmarnock and Irvine Valley; and Midlothian South, Tweeddale and Lauderdale. The region covers the whole of the council areas of Dumfries and Galloway, Scottish Borders, and South Ayrshire council areas; and parts of the council areas of East Ayrshire, Midlothian, and South Lanarkshire. By population it is now the largest of Scotland's eight electoral regions.

Prior to the 2025 review, there were nine constituencies in the South Scotland region. Besides Clydesdale, the other eight constituencies were: Ayr; Carrick, Cumnock and Doon Valley; Dumfriesshire; East Lothian; Ettrick, Roxburgh and Berwickshire; Galloway and West Dumfries; Kilmarnock and Irvine Valley and Midlothian South, Tweeddale and Lauderdale. The region covered the Dumfries and Galloway, East Ayrshire, Scottish Borders and South Ayrshire council areas in full and elements of the East Lothian, Midlothian and South Lanarkshire council areas.

== Constituency boundaries and council area ==
Map of boundaries from 2011

Clydesdale constituency is one of five covering the South Lanarkshire council area. Of the five, East Kilbride and Hamilton, Larkhall and Stonehouse are also now within the South Scotland region. Rutherglen is within the Glasgow region; Uddingston and Bellshill is part of the Central Scotland and Lothians West region.

The Clydesdale constituency was created at the same time as the Scottish Parliament, in 1999, with the name and boundaries of an existing Clydedale Parliament constituency of the UK Parliament. For the 2005 United Kingdom general election Scottish House of Commons constituencies were mostly replaced with new constituencies. The seat remained unchanged following the Second Periodic Review of Scottish Parliament Boundaries undertaken by Boundaries Scotland ahead of the 2026 Scottish Parliament election. The electoral wards of South Lanarkshire Council used in the current creation of Clydesdale are:

- Clydesdale West (entire ward)
- Clydesdale North (entire ward)
- Clydesdale East (entire ward)
- Clydesdale South (entire ward)
- Avondale and Stonehouse (shared with Hamilton, Larkhall and Stonehouse)
- East Kilbride South (shared with East Kilbride)

== Member of the Scottish Parliament ==
| Election | Member | Party |
|---|---|---|
| 1999 | Karen Gillon | Labour |
| 2011 | Aileen Campbell | SNP |
| 2021 | Màiri McAllan | SNP |

== Election results ==
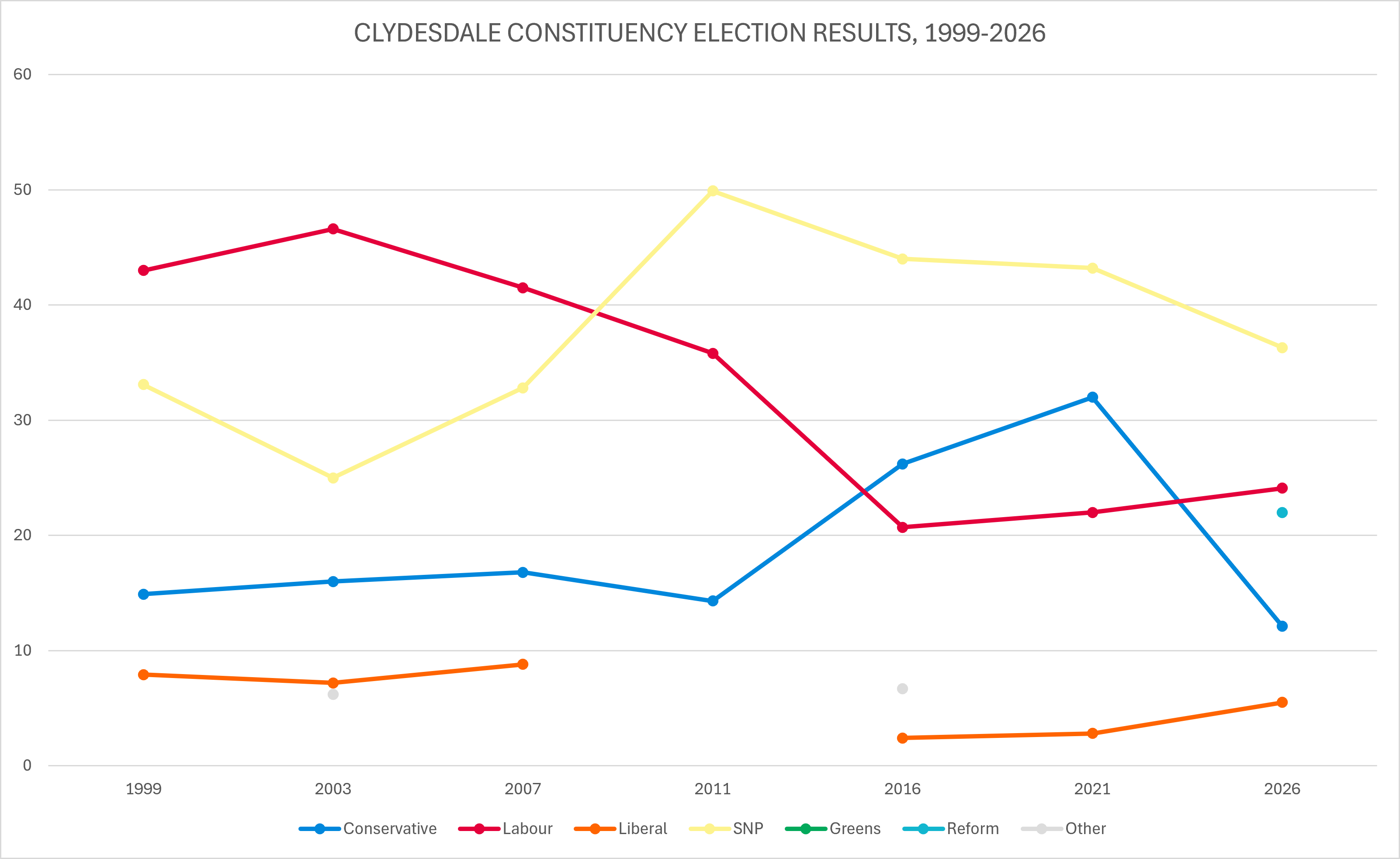
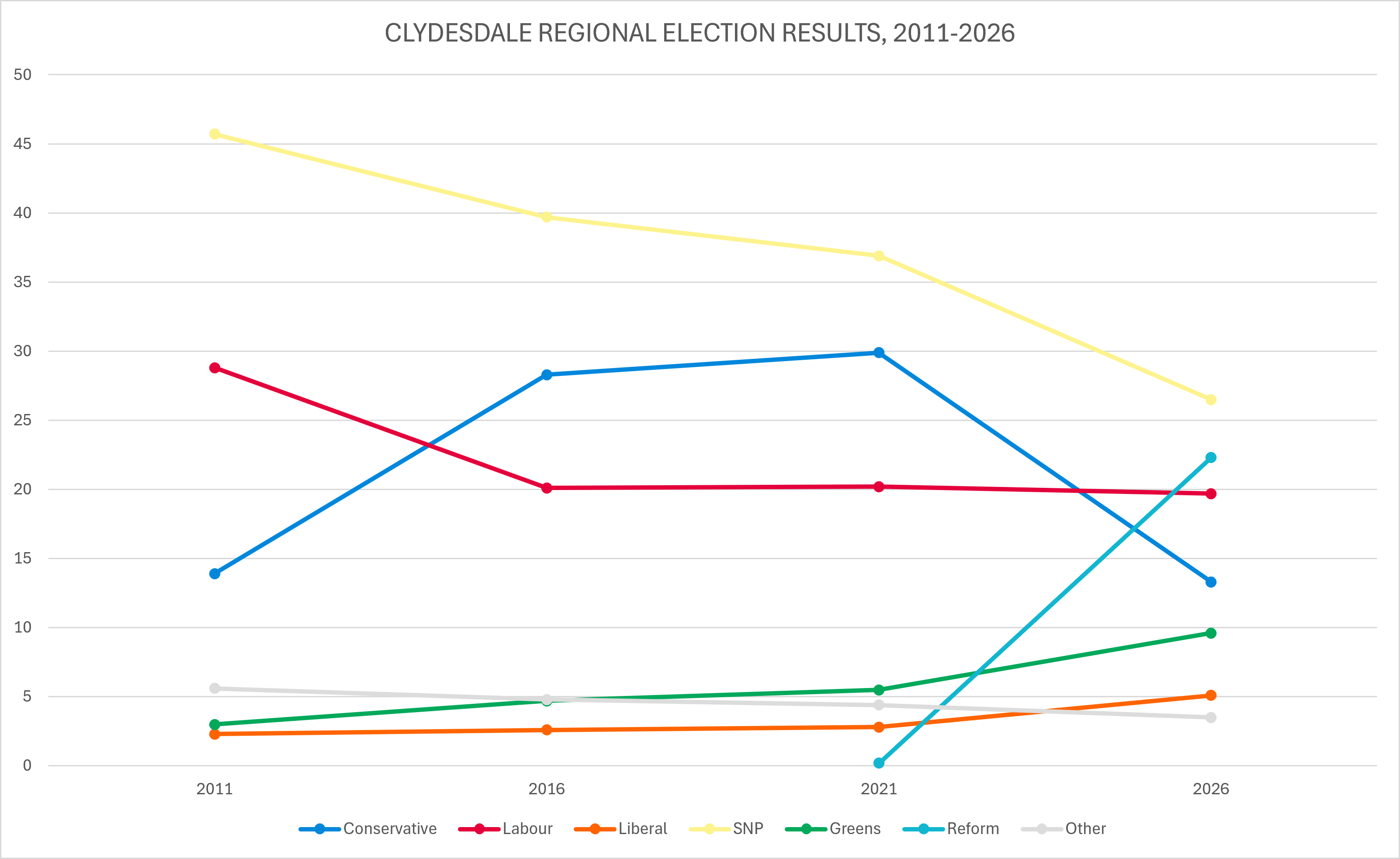

=== 2020s ===
2026 Scottish Parliament election: Clydesdale
| Party | Candidate | Constituency | | | Regional | | |
| Party | Candidate | Votes | % | ±% | Votes | % | ±% |
|---|---|---|---|---|---|---|---|
| SNP | Màiri McAllan (Note: Incumbent member for this constituency) | 13,006 | 36.3 | ▼6.9 | 9,529 | 26.5 | ▼10.5 |
| Labour | Lynsey Hamilton | 8,618 | 24.1 | ▲2.1 | 7,102 | 19.7 | ▼0.5 |
| Reform | Dan Clarke | 7,898 | 22.0 | New | 8,041 | 22.3 | New |
| Conservative | Julie Pirone | 4,344 | 12.1 | ▼19.9 | 4,781 | 13.3 | ▼16.6 |
| Green | | | | | 3,468 | 9.6 | ▲4.1 |
| Liberal Democrats | Richard John Brodie | 1,957 | 5.5 | ▲2.7 | 1,847 | 5.1 | ▲2.3 |
| AtLS | | | | | 292 | 0.8 | New |
| Scottish Family | | | | | 288 | 0.8 | ▲0.2 |
| Independent Green Voice | | | | | 285 | 0.8 | ▲0.3 |
| Scottish Socialist | | | | | 95 | 0.3 | New |
| UKIP | | | | | 54 | 0.2 | Steady |
| Heritage | | | | | 47 | 0.1 | New |
| Independent | Denise Sommerville | | | | 45 | 0.1 | New |
| Independent | Sean Davies | | | | 44 | 0.1 | New |
| ADF | | | | | 35 | 0.1 | New |
| Scottish Libertarian | | | | | 25 | 0.1 | ▼0.1 |
| Scottish Common Party | | | | | 17 | 0.05 | New |
| Majority | | 4,388 | 12.2 | ▲1.0 | | | |
| Valid votes | | 35,823 | | | 35,995 | | |
| Invalid votes | | 161 | | | 93 | | |
| Turnout | | 35,984 | 56.8 | ▼10.0 | 36,088 | 56.9 | ▼10.0 |
| SNP hold | | Swing | | ▲3.8 | | | |
Notes

2021 Scottish Parliament election: Clydesdale
| Party | Candidate | Constituency | | | Regional | | |
| Party | Candidate | Votes | % | ±% | Votes | % | ±% |
|---|---|---|---|---|---|---|---|
| SNP | Màiri McAllan | 17,596 | 43.2 | ▼0.8 | 15,081 | 36.9 | ▼2.8 |
| Conservative | Eric Holford | 13,018 | 32.0 | ▲5.8 | 12,208 | 29.9 | ▲1.6 |
| Labour | Claudia Beamish (Note: Incumbent member on the party list, or for another constituency) | 8,960 | 22.0 | ▲1.3 | 8,243 | 20.2 | ▲0.1 |
| Green | | | | | 2,258 | 5.5 | ▲0.8 |
| Liberal Democrats | Amanda Kubie | 1,144 | 2.8 | ▲0.4 | 1,144 | 2.8 | ▲0.2 |
| Alba | | | | | 517 | 1.3 | New |
| All for Unity | | | | | 504 | 1.2 | New |
| Scottish Family | | | | | 234 | 0.6 | New |
| Independent Green Voice | | | | | 182 | 0.4 | New |
| Abolish the Scottish Parliament | | | | | 123 | 0.3 | New |
| Freedom Alliance (UK) | | | | | 86 | 0.2 | New |
| Reform | | | | | 84 | 0.2 | New |
| Scottish Libertarian | | | | | 71 | 0.2 | New |
| UKIP | | | | | 65 | 0.2 | ▼2.1 |
| Scotia Future | | | | | 16 | 0.0 | New |
| Vanguard Party (UK) | | | | | 8 | 0.0 | New |
| Majority | | 4,578 | 11.2 | ▼6.6 | | | |
| Valid votes | | 40,718 | | | 40,824 | | |
| Invalid votes | | 156 | | | 81 | | |
| Turnout | | 40,874 | 66.8 | ▲9.0 | 40,905 | 66.9 | ▲9.1 |
| SNP hold | | Swing | | ▼3.3 | | | |

=== 2010s ===
2016 Scottish Parliament election: Clydesdale
| Party | Candidate | Constituency | | | Regional | | |
| Party | Candidate | Votes | % | ±% | Votes | % | ±% |
|---|---|---|---|---|---|---|---|
| SNP | Aileen Campbell (Note: Incumbent member for this constituency) | 14,821 | 44.0 | ▼5.9 | 13,389 | 39.7 | ▼6.0 |
| Conservative | Alex Allison | 8,842 | 26.2 | ▲11.9 | 9,537 | 28.3 | ▲14.4 |
| Labour | Claudia Beamish (Note: Incumbent member on the party list, or for another constituency) | 6,995 | 20.7 | ▼15.1 | 6,772 | 20.1 | ▼8.7 |
| Green | | | | | 1,572 | 4.7 | ▲1.7 |
| Independent | Danny Meikle | 1,332 | 4.0 | New | | | |
| Clydesdale and South Scotland Independent | Bev Gauld | 909 | 2.7 | New | 536 | 1.6 | New |
| Liberal Democrats | Jennifer Jamieson Ball | 820 | 2.4 | New | 865 | 2.6 | ▲0.3 |
| UKIP | | | | | 777 | 2.3 | ▲2.2 |
| Solidarity | | | | | 169 | 0.5 | ▲0.4 |
| RISE | | | | | 123 | 0.4 | New |
| Majority | | 5,979 | 17.8 | ▲3.7 | | | |
| Valid votes | | 33,719 | | | 33,740 | | |
| Invalid votes | | 83 | | | 66 | | |
| Turnout | | 33,802 | 57.8 | ▲4.9 | 33,806 | 57.8 | ▲4.9 |
| SNP hold | | Swing | | ▼8.9 | | | |
Notes

2011 Scottish Parliament election: Clydesdale
| Party | Candidate | Constituency | | | Regional | | |
| Party | Candidate | Votes | % | ±% | Votes | % | ±% |
|---|---|---|---|---|---|---|---|
| SNP | Aileen Campbell (Note: Incumbent member on the party list, or for another constituency) | 14,931 | 49.9 | N/A | 13,813 | 45.7 | N/A |
| Labour | Karen Gillon (Note: Incumbent member for this constituency) | 10,715 | 35.8 | N/A | 8,650 | 28.8 | N/A |
| Conservative | Colin McGavigan | 4,291 | 14.3 | N/A | 4,177 | 13.9 | N/A |
| Green | | | | | 908 | 3.0 | N/A |
| Liberal Democrats | | | | | 700 | 2.3 | N/A |
| All-Scotland Pensioners Party | | | | | 464 | 1.5 | N/A |
| BNP | | | | | 267 | 0.9 | N/A |
| Scottish Christian | | | | | 339 | 1.1 | N/A |
| Scottish Socialist | | | | | 75 | 0.3 | N/A |
| Socialist Labour | | | | | 253 | 0.8 | N/A |
| Solidarity | | | | | 42 | 0.1 | N/A |
| UKIP | | | | | 279 | 0.9 | N/A |
| Majority | | 4,216 | 14.1 | N/A | | | |
| Valid votes | | 29,937 | | | 29,967 | | |
| Invalid votes | | 136 | | | 85 | | |
| Turnout | | 30,073 | 52.9 | N/A | 30,052 | 52.9 | N/A |
| SNP win (new boundaries) | | | | | | | |

=== 2000s ===
2007 Scottish Parliament election: Clydesdale
| Party | Candidate | Votes | % | ±% |
|---|---|---|---|---|
| Labour | Karen Gillon | 13,835 | 41.5 | −4.1 |
| SNP | Aileen Campbell | 10,942 | 32.8 | +7.8 |
| Conservative | Colin McGavigan | 5,604 | 16.8 | +0.8 |
| Liberal Democrats | Fraser Grieve | 2,951 | 8.8 | +1.6 |
| Majority | | 2,893 | 8.7 | −13.9 |
| Turnout | | 33,332 | 50.5 | −0.5 |
| Labour hold | | Swing | | |

2003 Scottish Parliament election: Clydesdale
| Party | Candidate | Votes | % | ±% |
|---|---|---|---|---|
| Labour | Karen Gillon | 14,800 | 46.6 | +2.6 |
| SNP | John Brady | 8,129 | 25.0 | −7.9 |
| Conservative | Alastair Campbell | 5,174 | 16.0 | +1.1 |
| Liberal Democrats | Fraser Grieve | 2,338 | 7.2 | −0.6 |
| Scottish Socialist | Owen Meharry | 1,422 | 4.4 | New |
| Independent | David Morrison | 579 | 1.8 | New |
| Majority | | 6,671 | 21.6 | +11.6 |
| Turnout | | 32,442 | 51.0 | −9.6 |
| Labour hold | | Swing | +5.3 | |

=== 1990s ===
1999 Scottish Parliament election: Clydesdale
| Party | Candidate | Votes | % | ±% |
|---|---|---|---|---|
| Labour | Karen Gillon | 16,755 | 43.02 | N/A |
| SNP | Anne Winning | 12,875 | 33.06 | N/A |
| Conservative | Charles Cormack | 5,814 | 14.93 | N/A |
| Liberal Democrats | Sandra Grieve | 3,503 | 7.89 | N/A |
| Majority | | 3,880 | 9.96 | N/A |
| Turnout | | 39,324 | 60.61 | N/A |
| Labour win (new seat) | | | | |

== See also ==
- Clydesdale (UK Parliament constituency)
