= Minister for Children, Young People and the Promise =

Junior ministerial post in the Scottish Government

Minister for Children, Young People and The Promise
- Scottish Gaelic: Ministear na Cloinne, na h-Òigridh agus An Gealladh

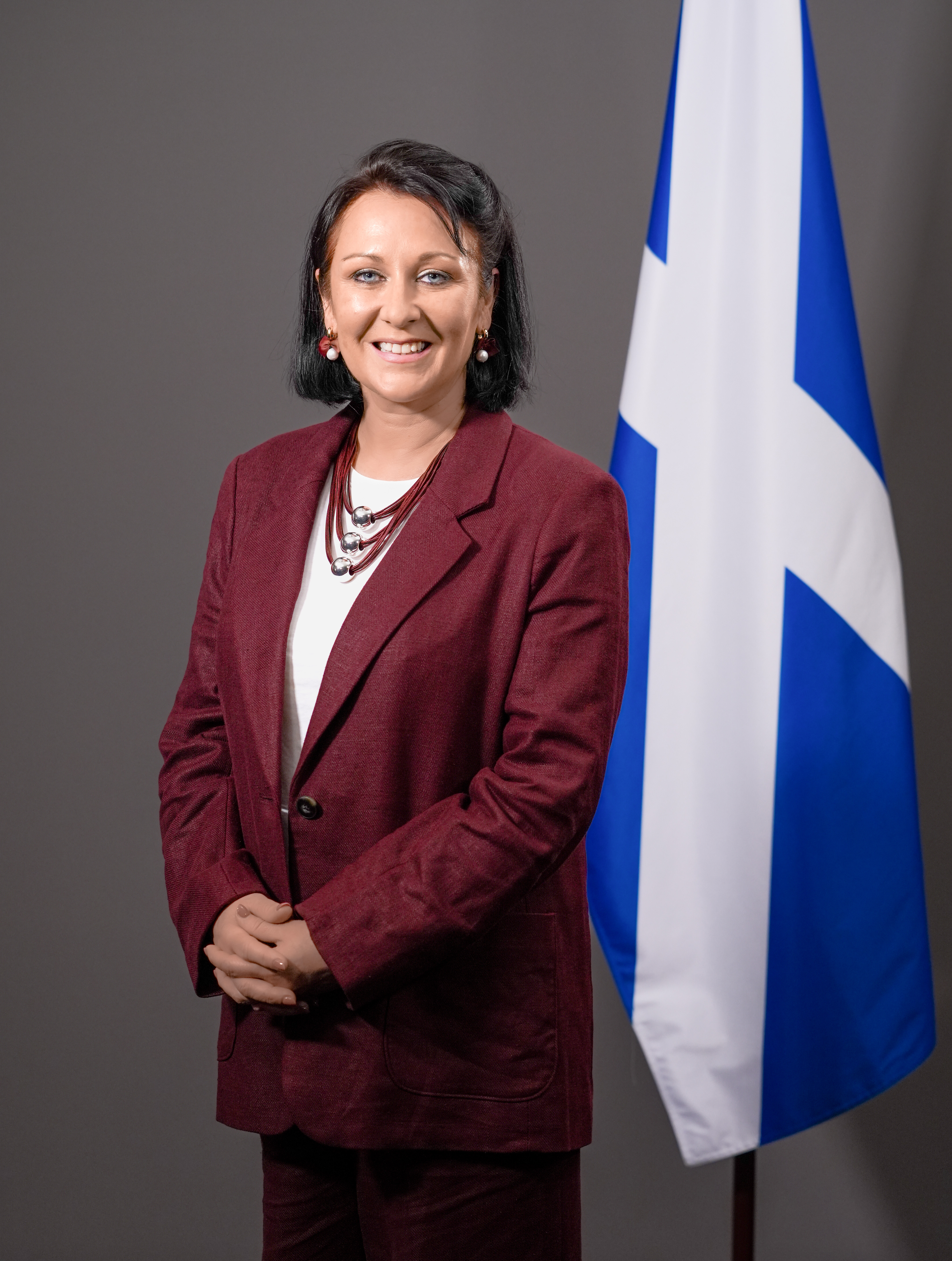
- Incumbent; Siobhian Brown since 20 May 2026
- Style: Minister (within parliament); Children's Minister (informal); Scottish Children's Minister (outwith Scotland)
- Member of: Scottish Parliament; Scottish Government
- Reports to: Scottish Parliament
- Seat: Edinburgh
- Appointer: First Minister
- Inaugural holder: Adam Ingram Minister for Children and the Early Years
- Formation: 17 May 2007
- Salary: £106,185 per annum (2024) (including £72,196 MSP salary)
- Website: www.gov.scot

The Minister for Children, Young People and The Promise is a junior ministerial post in the Scottish Government. As a junior minister, the holder does not attend the Scottish Cabinet. The incumbent reports to the Cabinet Secretary for Education and Skills, who has overall responsibility for the portfolio, and is a member of Cabinet.

The Minister for Children, Young People and The Promise has specific responsibility for the social services workforce, childcare and preschool, children's services, children's hearings and the Care Inspectorate. The current holder of the role is Siobhian Brown who was appointed in May 2026 upon the formation of the Second Swinney government.

== Overview ==
The post holder is responsible for:

- adoption and fostering
- Bairn's Hoose (reporting jointly with Minister for Victims and Community Safety)
- child protection
- children and young people with learning disabilities and/or autism
- children's hearings
- children's rights
- children's services
- Creating Positive Futures
- Disclosure Scotland
- early years
- kinship carers
- looked after children
- outdoor learning
- play, including play parks
- protection of vulnerable groups
- The Promise - reports to First Minister
- transitions for those with disabilities and/or autism

== History ==
From 1999 to 2000, responsibility for Children and Early Years rested with the Minister for Children and Education, which became the Minister for Education, Europe and External Affairs in the McLeish Government of 2000 to 2001. From 2001 to 2007 the portfolio rested with the Minister for Education and Young People.

The Salmond government, elected following the 2007 Scottish Parliament election created the junior post of the Minister for Children and Early Years to assist the Cabinet Secretary for Education and Skills. The post was renamed Minister for Children and Young People in June 2018.

The post was further renamed in March 2023 when Humza Yousaf became First Minister to Minister for Children, Young People and Keeping the Promise, before later being changed to Minister for Children, Young People and the Promise when Yousaf was replaced by John Swinney. This was to further the work that the Scottish Government had taken forward for those young people who are or had been care experienced.

== Minister ==
The current Minister for Children, Young People and the Promise is Siobhian Brown.

Name	Portrait	Entered office	Left office	Party	First Minister
Minister for Children and the Early Years
Adam Ingram		17 May 2007	20 May 2011	Scottish National Party	Alex Salmond
Minister for Children and Young People
Angela Constance		20 May 2011	7 December 2011	Scottish National Party	Alex Salmond
Aileen Campbell		7 December 2011	18 December 2014 (on maternity leave)	Scottish National Party	Alex Salmond; Nicola Sturgeon
Fiona McLeod		18 December 2014	31 August 2015	Scottish National Party	Nicola Sturgeon
Aileen Campbell		31 August 2015	18 May 2016	Scottish National Party	Nicola Sturgeon
Minister for Childcare and Early Years
Mark McDonald		18 May 2016	7 November 2017	Scottish National Party	Nicola Sturgeon
Maree Todd		7 November 2017	27 June 2018	Scottish National Party	Nicola Sturgeon
Minister for Children and Young People
Maree Todd		27 June 2018	20 May 2021	Scottish National Party	Nicola Sturgeon
Clare Haughey		20 May 2021	28 March 2023	Scottish National Party	Nicola Sturgeon
Minister for Children, Young People and the Promise
Natalie Don		28 March 2023 (Note: As Minister for Children, Young People and Keeping the Promise from 29 March 2023 to 8 May 2024.)	20 May 2026	Scottish National Party	Humza Yousaf; John Swinney
Siobhian Brown		20 May 2026	Incumbent	Scottish National Party	John Swinney

== See also ==
- Scottish Parliament
- Scottish Government
