= Service Measurement Index =

The Service Measurement Index is an application framework that defines method for the calculation of a relative index, which may be used to compare IT services against one another, or to track services over time.

== Function ==
From a practical standpoint, SMI enables consumers of IT business services to make informed decisions about selecting specific services and service providers. SMI works by letting consumers of cloud services rate them, via standardized surveys, across six key metrics: quality, agility, risk, cost, capability, and security. There is a large and growing database of completed surveys and currently over 120 services have been rated.

A consumer wishing to compare services can indicate how important each of the six metrics is to that user for a particular type of service. Comparison scores (1-99) are then generated from the ratings, relative to other services of the same type – taking into consideration the concerns of this consumer. For example, if a particular consumer wants to compare email services and for that consumer, the SMI will assign higher scores to email services where security is a stronger point than cost.

== Principles of operation ==
In order to make a meaningful relative comparison of IT Services, only those services which are functionally similar can be included in any comparison. This implies that a standard taxonomy of IT Services must be used so that each separate user of the Service Management Index is not required to define the functions for which they are searching.

Such a standard taxonomy is currently being produced by the TM Forum project "Cloud Service Definitions (Taxonomy)", and can be viewed here.

Goodness is used to express the appropriateness or usefulness of the IT Service to a specific consumer of that service. The service provider must, therefore, define the factors or characteristics which make up the composite; each consumer's individual weighting of those characteristics will tailor the composite to their specific needs.

The initial characteristics are organized in an hierarchical structure as follows:

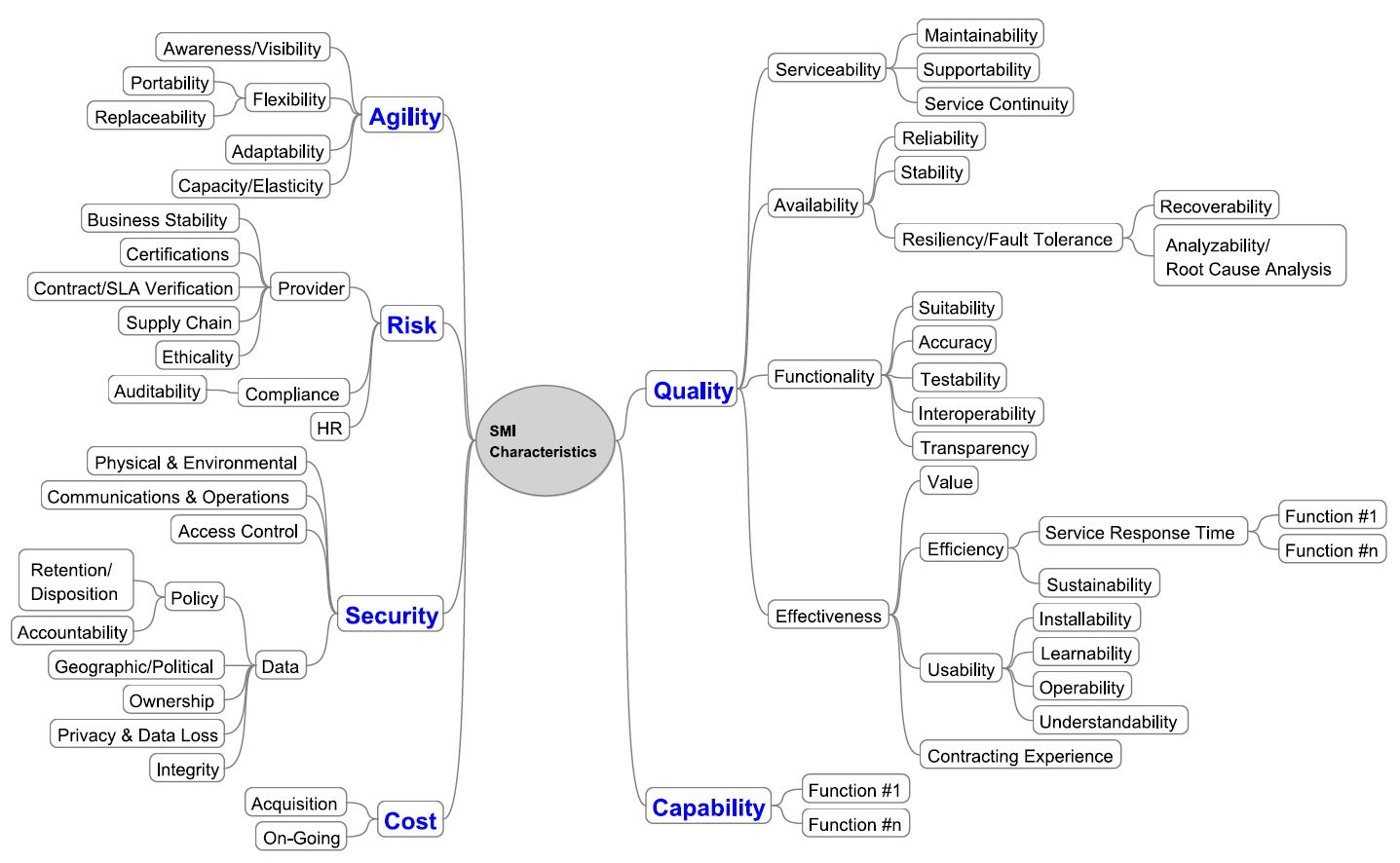
SMI Characteristics

- The value to the consumer of an index, such as SMI, is especially great with the expansion of both Service and Sourcing choices brought about by the widespread adoption (by vendors) of cloud-based Services and Service delivery.
- The characteristics and sub-characteristics shown above are measured through a set of metrics or indicators, following an ontology similar to that defined by punter.
- Where possible, available and well-known characteristics were used from such standards as ISO/IEC 9126/25000 and ISO/IEC 20000, and concepts introduced by ISACA in its COBIT framework were also incorporated.
- In order to progress the initial Service Measurement Index framework toward an International Standard, a consortium led by Carnegie Mellon University has been formed.

== Cloud Commons ==
Cloud Commons is an independent community of IT professionals, analysts, technology providers, and industry experts. In addition to being the home for SMI, it is a place to find and contribute user experiences, best practices, cloud-related news, and discussions.

== See also ==
- Performance indicator
