= Social Security (Scotland) Act 2018 =

Act of the Scottish Parliament

- Act of the Scottish Parliament
- Scottish Parliament
- Long title: An Act of the Scottish Parliament making provision about social security.
- Citation: 2018 asp 19
- Introduced by: Angela Constance MSP, Cabinet Secretary for Communities, Social Security and Equalities
- Territorial extent: Scotland

Dates
- Royal assent: 1 June 2018

Other legislation
- Relates to: Scotland Act 2016

Status: Current legislation

History of passage through the Parliament

Text of statute as originally enacted

Text of the Social Security (Scotland) Act 2018 as in force today (including any amendments) within the United Kingdom, from legislation.gov.uk.

The Social Security (Scotland) Act 2018 (asp 19) is an act of the Scottish Parliament to allow for the devolution of aspects of the social security system to the Scottish Parliament as part of the devolution settlement agreed by the Smith Commission after the independence referendum in 2014.

== Legislative passage ==
At the stage 3 debate, the legislation received a unanimous vote in favour of the legislation.

== Provisions ==
This Act provides for the establishment of the agency to provide social security payments, known as Social Security Scotland.

The legislation requires the Scottish Government to establish a social security charter. Disabled people are required to be offered social security advocacy.

Payments made under the act are legislated to be indexed according to inflation.

=== Scottish Commission on Social Security ===
Scottish Commission on Social Security
- Logo of the Scottish Commission on Social Security

Agency overview
- Formed: 2019
- Type: Advisory non-departmental public body
- Jurisdiction: Scotland
- Headquarters: Victoria Quay, Edinburgh, EH6 6QQ
- Website: socialsecuritycommission.scot

The Scottish Commission on Social Security (SCoSS) is an independent advisory body established under the act, following the devolution of certain social security powers to the Scottish Parliament. SCoSS provides independent scrutiny of draft regulations relating to devolved social security benefits. It submits reports to both the Scottish Government and the Scottish Parliament, assessing whether proposed regulations are compatible with human rights obligations and consistent with the principles set out in the Social Security Charter. These principles include dignity, fairness, and respect.

In addition to scrutinising regulations, SCoSS has a statutory role in relation to the charter itself. It is required to review and report on any proposed revisions to the charter, ensuring that changes reflect the expectations set out in the 2018 act. This function is intended to support transparency and accountability in how the charter is maintained and applied.

The commission consists of appointed members with experience in areas such as law, public policy, human rights, and social security. It publishes its reports and recommendations online, contributing to public understanding of the social security system in Scotland.

SCoSS does not have decision-making authority, but its scrutiny and advice are intended to inform the development and implementation of social security policy within the devolved framework.
