= Social Security Scotland =

Agency of the Scottish Government

Social Security Scotland Tèarainteachd Shòisealta Alba

Executive Agency overview
- Formed: 2018
- Preceding agencies: Department for Work and Pensions; Secretary of State for Work and Pensions
- Jurisdiction: Scotland
- Headquarters: Dundee Glasgow
- Motto: Dignity, fairness, respect.
- Employees: 4,332 (at December 2025)
- Minister responsible: Shirley-Anne Somerville MSP, Cabinet Secretary for Social Justice
- Executive Agency executives: David Wallace, Chief Executive; Karyn Dunning, Chief Operating Officer
- Website: www.socialsecurity.gov.scot

Social Security Scotland (Scottish Gaelic: Tèarainteachd Shòisealta Alba) is an executive agency of the Scottish Government with responsibility for social security provision.

== History ==
The Scottish Parliament was created in 1999 with legislative authority over many areas of social policy. However, social security remained a reserved matter of the UK Government through the Department for Work and Pensions. The Smith Commission following the ‘No’ vote to independence in the 2014 referendum recommended that authority over several areas of social security be transferred to the Scottish Parliament under a revised devolution settlement for Scotland.

This was put into statue through the Scotland Act 2016.

== Legislation ==
With the Scotland Act 2016 transferring authority over some elements of social security, the Scottish Government introduced the Social Security (Scotland) Bill. This Bill introduced a different approach to administering social security in Scotland compared to the approach of the United Kingdom. The Bill set out 8 principles of social security, putting into statute that social security is a human right, it is to be delivered as a public service and that it is to contribute to the reducing of poverty and provide dignity and respect to Scottish citizens.

The Bill sets out the need for a Scottish social security charter, which sets out the expectations of Scottish Ministers when developing social security policy, the expectations of Social Security Scotland when administering policies, and the expectations on individuals who are receiving assistance from Social Security Scotland.

The Bill established the Scottish Commission on Social Security, which is a corporate body independent of the Scottish Government. The commission's purpose is to scrutinise Scottish Government policy decisions and to ensure that the Scottish Government and Social Security Scotland are fulfilling the legal requirements under the Bill.

This Bill was passed on 25 April 2018 and received Royal Assent on 1 June 2018 as the Social Security (Scotland) Act 2018. It is the first Scotland wide social security agency in the nation's history.

== Ministers ==
From March 2023, the Cabinet Secretary of the Scottish Government with responsibility for Social Security Scotland is the Cabinet Secretary for Social Justice. Previously, the position was supported by the Minister for Social Security and Local Government. From June 2018 to May 2021, responsibility sat with the Cabinet Secretary for Social Security and Older People, supported by the Minister for Equalities and Older People.

Name	Portrait	Entered office	Left office	Party	First Minister
=== Minister for Social Security ===
Jeane Freeman		18 May 2016	26 June 2018	Scottish National Party	Nicola Sturgeon
Ben Macpherson		20 May 2021	29 March 2023	Scottish National Party	Nicola Sturgeon
=== Cabinet Secretary for Social Security and Older People ===
Shirley-Anne Somerville		26 June 2018	20 May 2021	Scottish National Party	Nicola Sturgeon
=== Cabinet Secretary for Social Justice, Housing and Local Government ===
Shona Robison		20 May 2021	29 March 2023	Scottish National Party	Nicola Sturgeon
=== Cabinet Secretary for Social Justice ===
Shirley-Anne Somerville		29 March 2023	Incumbent	Scottish National Party	Humza Yousaf; John Swinney

== Disability Benefits ==
The Scottish Government is responsible for administering disability benefits to people in Scotland, which were previously delivered by the UK Government's Department for Work and Pensions.

=== Child Disability Payment ===
Child Disability Payment provides support for the extra costs that a disabled child might have and can be paid up until a child turns 18 years old. The payment has a care component and a mobility component, each with three different payment rates.

Child Disability Payment was launched as a pilot in Dundee City, Perth and Kinross, and the Western Isles in July 2021 and rolled out to the rest of Scotland in November 2021. Child Disability Payment replaced Disability Living Allowance for Children.

=== Adult Disability Payment ===
Adult Disability Payment provides support for people between 16 years old and state pension age who are disabled, have a long-term health condition, or a terminal illness. The payment has a daily living component and a mobility component, with standard and enhanced payment rates.

Adult Disability Payment rolled out in phases across Council areas from March 2022 and launched nationally in August 2022. Adult Disability Payment replaced Personal Independence Payment. People with awards of Personal Independence Payment had their payments automatically transferred to Adult Disability PAyment, from summer 2022 to the end of 2025.

=== Pension Age Disability Payment ===
Pension Age Disability Payment provides support to people who have reached State Pension age that have care needs due to a disability or long-term health condition. Pension Age Disability Payment replaced Attendance Allowance.

The benefit launched as a pilot in Argyll & Bute, Highland, Aberdeen City, Orkney and Shetland on 21 October 2024. It then extended to 13 more local authority areas on 24 March 2025, before being available across Scotland on 22 April 2025.

== Carer's Benefits ==
=== Carer Support Payment ===
In November 2024, Carer Support Payment replaced Carer's Allowance in Scotland for all new applicants, with existing recipients transitioned to the new payment from spring 2025.

=== Carer's Additional Person Payment ===
From March 2025, Carer's Additional Person Payment is a new payment available for people in Scotland who receive Carer Support Payment and who care for more than one person who get a disability benefit.

=== Scottish Carer Support ===
From March 2025, Scottish Carer Supplement replaced the previous twice yearly Carer's Allowance Supplement, for people who receive Carer Support Payment. Instead of two payments each year, Scottish Carer Supplement is paid alongside Carer Support Payment.

=== Young Carer Grant ===
Young Carer Grant is a new benefit which provides support to young carers, aged 16 to 18 years old, who care for someone for at least 16 hours a week but do not qualify for Carer's Allowance. Young Carer Grant launched in October 2019 and currently is a yearly payment of £390.25.

== Low Income Benefits ==
The Scottish Government has taken over several benefits for people and families on low incomes from the Department for Work and Pensions. New benefits for people on low incomes have also been launched.

=== Scottish Child Payment ===
Scottish Child Payment provides support for families on low incomes with children under 16 years old and in receipt of certain means-tested benefits, such as Universal Credit, Jobseeker's Allowance, Employment and Support Allowance, and certain legacy benefits.

Scottish Child Payment was a new payment announced by the Scottish Government in 2019 as a means to help reduce the prevalence of childhood poverty in Scotland. It was first introduced for eligible families with children under six, with applications open from November 2020 and first payments made in February 2021. Initially the payment was £10 per week, per child, however this was doubled to £20 in April 2021.

On 14 November 2022, Scottish Child Payment rolled out to families with children under 16 years old and the payment increased for a third time to £25 per week, per child.

As of April 2026, the Scottish Child Payment is set at £28.20 per week per eligible child. In March 2026, 321,885 children received the payment.

The Scottish Government has described the payment as part of a broader approach to reducing child poverty, distinct from the welfare policies applied in other parts of the United Kingdom.

Under the devolution settlement established by the Scotland Act 2016, the Scottish Government has the power to create new benefits and top up existing ones in devolved areas. However, certain welfare provisions—including Universal Credit, the state pension, the overall benefit cap, and housing benefit policy—remain reserved to the UK Parliament and are set by Westminster.

As a result, the Scottish Government can introduce supplementary payments and adjust certain transfer arrangements, but cannot fundamentally restructure the core welfare framework within Scotland.

SNP leader Stephen Flynn has urged Scottish Labour MPs to support an amendment to scrap the two-child benefit cap, calling it a test of Labour's commitment to real change. Labour's Chancellor Rachel Reeves insists they will not make unfunded spending commitments.

=== Best Start Grant ===
Best Start Grant and Best Start Foods provides support to families to help with costs during key early years of a child's life. Best Start Grant is made up of three payments: Pregnancy and Baby Payment, Early Learning Payment, and School Age Payment. While Pregnancy and Baby Payment replaced Sure Start Maternity Grant, Early Learning Payment and School Age Payment are new benefits introduced by the Scottish Government.

=== Funeral Support Payment ===
Funeral Support Payment replaced the Funeral Payment in September 2019 and aims to reduce funeral poverty in Scotland by providing people who receive certain benefits or tax credits with a payment that can be used to help pay funeral costs, burial or cremation costs, travel costs, and medical costs.

=== Job Start Payment ===
Job Start Payment is a new benefit to help young people aged 16 to 24 years old (or up to 25 years old if a care leaver) with the costs of the transition into employment, after a period of time out of paid work. The benefit launched in August 2020 after a short delay due to COVID-19. The current payment is £319.80, or £511.65 if the person is the main carer of a child.

== Winter Benefits ==
=== Child Winter Heating Payment ===
Child Winter Heating Payment is a new payment to help with winter costs for families with children in receipt Child Disability Payment or the highest rate of the care component of Disability Living Allowance for children.

Child Winter Heating Payment was the first disability benefit delivered by Social Security Scotland and launched in winter 2020, with the first families being paid in December 2020. The payment currently is £235.70 per eligible child, and is paid automatically to eligible families without needing to apply.

=== Winter Heating Payment ===
Winter Heating Payment replaced the Cold Weather Payment in 2023 to help with winter costs for people who receive who income benefits who might have extra heating needs. To be eligible, people need to be in receipt of a qualifying benefit and meet an additional criteria during a qualifying week in November 2022. The benefit is automatically paid and currently is a payment of £50.

=== Pension Age Winter Heating Payment ===
Pension Age Winter Heating Payment helps people of pension age who receive certain benefits pay their heating bills. It replaces Winter Fuel Payment for people in Scotland and has the same eligibility rules.

== Upcoming Benefits ==
=== Employment Injury Assistance ===
Employment Injury Assistance is planned to replace Industrial Injuries Disablement Benefit (IIDB) after the 2026 election.

== Locations ==
Social Security Scotland operates from the headquarters Agnes Husband House in Dundee and a large office on High Street, Glasgow. Social Security Scotland also offers a local delivery service of trained advisors located in each local authority in Scotland for face-to-face provision.

== Budget ==
The 2025-26 budget was set at £7.0 billion, which comprises an operating budget of £320.6 million and a benefit expenditure budget of £6.7 billion.

== Social Security reserved to the United Kingdom ==
With the Scotland Act 2016 only devolving some aspects of social security provisions, many services remain reserved to the UK Government, administered through the Department for Work and Pensions based on UK Government policy decisions. These include:

- Universal Credit
- Jobseeker's Allowance
- Employment and Support Allowance
- Income Support
- Working Tax Credit
- Child Tax Credit
- Housing Benefit
- Child Benefit
- Severe Disablement Allowance
- Maternity Allowance
- Guardian's Allowance
- State Pension
- Pension Credit
- Incapacity Benefit
- Vaccine Damage Payment
- Widowed Parent's Allowance
- Support for Mortgage Interest
- Statutory Payments
- Bereavement Allowance
- Bereavement Payment
- Widowed Payment Allowance
- Carer's Credit
- Armed Forces Independence Payment
- Parents Learning Allowance
- Blind Person's Allowance
- National Concessionary Fuel Scheme
- Warm Home Discount Scheme
- War Widower Pension
- Mortgage Interest Run On
- Diffuse Mesothelioma Payment
- Disability Premiums
