= Support for Mortgage Interest =

Support for Mortgage Interest (SMI) is a welfare benefit in the United Kingdom that entitles a person to help with their mortgage costs. The SMI is paid as a loan, which the person will need to repay with interest when he or she dies, sells or transfers ownership of their home. Before this date, SMI is paid as a benefit, which the beneficiary does not have to repay.

It is usually needed to be getting, or treated as getting, a qualifying benefit to get SMI. There's no guarantee that a person will get SMI for a mortgage or loan he or she takes out. To get SMI a person must be in receipt of one of the following benefits:

- Income Support
- income-based Jobseeker's Allowance
- income-related Employment and Support Allowance
- Pension Credit

Those in receipt of Universal Credit may also be entitled to SMI. The waiting time for help increased on 1 April 2016 from 13 weeks to 39 weeks. The cost of the benefit was £205 million in 2017. With SMI ending in April 2018, saving the government about £170 million a year, the Department for Work and Pensions is offering a loan, secured on the recipient's property, a move criticised because it would put properties of people on low incomes at risk; the cessation affects about 124,000 people.

== Key Facts ==
Sources:

- setting up the loan is charge-free
- a credit check is not required to get the loan
- regular payments are not needed as it is in the case of a normal loan – but if a person wants it, regular payments are possible
- interest is added to the total amount owed until the time loan is written off/paid back
- the loan is not acquired automatically
- the loan is secured against your home, when the home is sold or the ownership of the home is transferred to another person, then the loan must be paid back

SMI cannot help to pay:

- the amount the person borrowed (only the interest on the mortgage)
- anything towards insurance policies
- missed mortgage payments (arrears)

Support for mortgage interest can be also used to cover some other costs, but only under the conditions that:

- essential improvements or repairs are being done to the home – such as repairing necessary faults or adapting it to some exceptional conditions like for example a disabled member of a household
- after relationship separation, for buying off ex-partners' share

== Process ==
If the conditions for getting the loan were fulfilled, then the payment is not made right away it takes 39 weeks from the time when the Support for Mortgage Interests was claimed. There is only one exception, when the person is getting Pension Credit, in this particular case help is provided immediately. The waiting period is interrupted in the case when a person gets any paid job.

=== Amount of Money ===
The government can pay the interest up to £200,000 of the mortgage (but if the person is on the Pension Credit then up to £100,000). A standard interest rate is used by the government to calculate the amount of the money by which it will help, that means that the government's interest rate might differ from the interest rate on the mortgage. The payments will always be made to mortgage lenders directly. The SMI only covers the interest rate of the mortgage, not the actual amount that was borrowed.

=== Time Limits ===
There are certain conditions that can help to find out for how long person can get the SMI:

- if Jobseekers Allowance is claimed, then it can be expected to get SMI up to 2 years
- if a person gets one of the following supports, Income-related Employment and Support Allowance, Income Support, Pension Credit or Universal Credit, the limit for how long SMI can be claimed does not exist
- if SMI is given as a benefit, then the amount that has already been received does not have to be repaid

== Repayments ==
Various cases may occur when a person considers repaying an SMI loan. Here are some life examples to evaluate the situation properly:

- the SMI loan needs to be repaid till the death of the person that has the loan
- when the person moves from the house to which the loan is tied to, to another house and do not transfer the loan to the new property then the loan has to be repaid
- when the person that has an SMI loan dies but a civil partner or spouse inherit the house to which the loan is tied to, then it can be repaid till their death
- when the house, to which SMI loan was tied to, was sold but the money from the sale is not enough to cover the loan, then the amount left of the loan that money from the sale could not cover will be written off and loan will be considered fully repaid

== See also ==
- Housing Benefit
- Mortgage interest relief at source
