= Cabinet Secretary for Social Justice and Housing =

Scottish Cabinet position

Scotland Cabinet Secretary for Social Justice and Housing
- Scottish Gaelic: Rùnaire a’ Chaibineit airson Ceartas Sòisealta

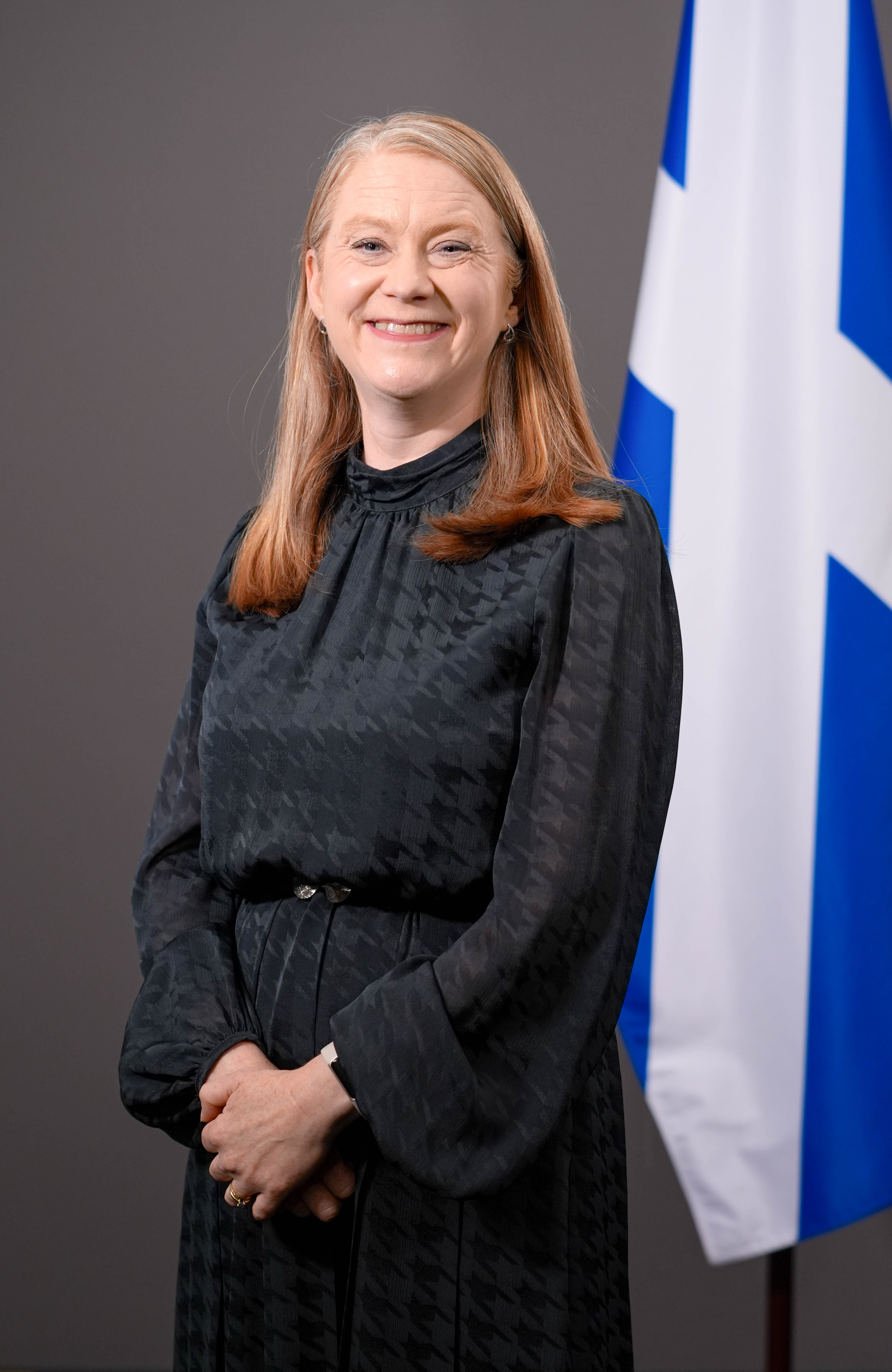
- Incumbent; Shirley-Anne Somerville since 29 March 2023
- Social Security Scotland; Scottish Government; Scottish Cabinet
- Style: Cabinet Secretary (within parliament); Social Justice Secretary (informal); Scottish Social Justice Secretary (outwith Scotland)
- Member of: Scottish Parliament; Scottish Cabinet
- Reports to: Scottish Parliament
- Seat: Edinburgh
- Appointer: First Minister
- Inaugural holder: Shona Robison; Cabinet Secretary for Commonwealth Games, Sport, Equalities and Pensioners' Rights
- Formation: 22 April 2014
- Deputy: Minister for Equalities
- Salary: £118,511 per annum (2023) (including £67,662 MSP salary)
- Website: www.gov.scot

The Cabinet Secretary for Social Justice and Housing (Scottish Gaelic: Rùnaire a’ Chaibineit airson Ceartas Sòisealta), commonly referred to as the Social Justice Secretary, is a position in the Scottish Government cabinet. The Cabinet Secretary has overall responsibility for community planning, social security, the third sector. The current Cabinet Secretary is Shirley-Anne Somerville since 2023.

The Cabinet Secretary is assisted by one junior Minister, the Minister for Equalities.

== History ==
From 2007 to 2009 the Minister for Communities and Sport was a junior ministerial post in the Scottish Government. In 2009, sport was linked with public health and the role became the Minister for Housing and Communities.

Following the 2011 election, the role was reorganised as Minister for Housing and Welfare but as a junior ministerial position, the Minister did not attend the Scottish Cabinet.

A cabinet post was created in April 2014 as a result of Alex Salmond's gender-balancing cabinet reshuffle. The post was Cabinet Secretary for Commonwealth Games, Sport, Equalities and Pensioners' Rights with Shona Robison at the helm. This was short-lived, however, as the job was further restyled as Cabinet Secretary for Social Justice, Communities and Pensioners' Rights as a result of Nicola Sturgeon's first reshuffle after she became First Minister in November 2014, with Alex Neil being given the role.

This was further rebranded in May 2016 as Cabinet Secretary for Communities, Social Security and Equalities in the second Sturgeon government, being held by Angela Constance.

Between 2018 and 2021 the role was divided between Shirley-Anne Somerville as Cabinet Secretary for Social Security and Older People, and Aileen Campbell as Cabinet Secretary for Communities and Local Government.

Following the appointment for the third Sturgeon government, the role was re-merged with Shona Robison appointed as Cabinet Secretary for Social Justice, Housing and Local Government.

Shirley-Anne Somerville was re-appointed to the role, as Cabinet Secretary for Social Justice, at the start of the first Yousaf government and retained her position in the second Yousaf government and the Swinney government.

== Overview ==
=== Responsibilities ===
The responsibilities of the Cabinet Secretary for Social Justice are:

- Baby Box
- benefit automation and advice services
- human rights
- minimum income guarantee
- Ministerial Taskforce on Population
- national mission for tackling child poverty
- Office of Chief Social Policy Advisor
- Scottish Government benefits (development and delivery)
- Scottish Welfare Fund and Discretionary Housing Payments (DHPs)
- social justice, tackling poverty and inequalities
- Social Security Scotland
- third sector, social enterprises and Office of the Scottish Charity Regulator (OSCR)
- UN treaty incorporation including United Nations Convention on the Rights of the Child (UNCRC)

=== Public bodies ===
The following public bodies report to the Cabinet Secretary for Social Justic:Justice:

- Social Security Scotland

== List of office holders ==
Name			Portrait		Entered office	Left office		Party		First Minister	
Cabinet Secretary for Commonwealth Games, Sport, Equalities and Pensioners' Rights
Shona Robison					22 April 2014	21 November 2014		Scottish National Party		Alex Salmond	
Cabinet Secretary for Social Justice, Communities and Pensioners' Rights
Alex Neil					21 November 2014	18 May 2016		Scottish National Party		Nicola Sturgeon	
Cabinet Secretary for Communities, Social Security and Equalities
Angela Constance					18 May 2016	26 June 2018		Scottish National Party		Nicola Sturgeon	
Cabinet Secretary for Social Security and Older People						Cabinet Secretary for Communities and Local Government					
Name	Portrait	Entered office	Left office	Party	First Minister	Name	Portrait	Entered office	Left office	Party	First Minister
Shirley-Anne Somerville		26 June 2018	19 May 2021	Scottish National Party	Nicola Sturgeon	Aileen Campbell		26 June 2018	19 May 2021	Scottish National Party	Nicola Sturgeon
Name			Portrait		Entered office	Left office		Party		First Minister	
Cabinet Secretary for Social Justice, Housing and Local Government
Shona Robison					20 May 2021	29 March 2023		Scottish National Party		Nicola Sturgeon	
Cabinet Secretary for Social Justice
Shirley-Anne Somerville					29 March 2023	20 May 2026		Scottish National Party		Humza Yousaf	
Shirley-Anne Somerville					29 March 2023	20 May 2026		Scottish National Party		John Swinney	
Cabinet Secretary for Social Justice and Housing
Shirley-Anne Somerville					20 May 2026	Incumbent		Scottish National Party		John Swinney	
