= Commission on Local Tax Reform =

The Commission on Local Tax Reform was a cross-party group set up by the Scottish Government in 2015, tasked with examining alternatives to the Council Tax. The commission was co-chaired by Marco Biagi MSP, Local Government Minister and David O'Neill, president of COSLA. It had a remit to look at systems around funding services delivered by local government and also the impact on those who pay tax. The final report Just Change: A New Approach to Local Taxation was published on 14 December 2015.

== Background ==
In November 2014, the Scottish Government announced its intention to set up an independent commission. Proposals for a fairer system of local government finance had been in the SNP's 2011 manifesto. The commission was announced as part of the first legislative programme introduced by Nicola Sturgeon as Scotland's First Minister. The Scottish Trades Union Congress (STUC) welcomed the plans.

The commission was set up as a cross-party group, although the Conservative party decided not to take part. Each political party was invited to nominate their own representatives, with the selection then being jointly agreed upon by Cosla and the Scottish Government. The membership of the commission and the proposed timetable for their work was confirmed on 20 February 2015.

== Remit ==
The commission was to consider:

- how suggestions might impact on individuals and households
- how any changes might affect inequalities in income and wealth
- wider impacts of tax change
- what administrative and collection arrangements might apply
- what transition timetables might be possible
- any impacts on local democracy
- alternatives for raising revenue at both local authority and national levels

It was not considering issues relating to national non-domestic rates, commonly known as business rates.

== Schedule ==
The first meeting of the committee was held on 23 February 2015. Submissions of evidence were accepted by the committee until 22 June 2015. The committee produced their final report on 14 December 2015. There were 4,492 respondents to an online survey, the results of which were released ahead of the final report.

== Commission membership ==
There are 13 people appointed to the commission:

- Councillor Susan Aitken, the SNP group leader on Glasgow City Council
- Councillor Catriona Bhatia, the Liberal Democrat group leader on Scottish Borders Council
- Marco Biagi MSP, the Minister for Local Government and Community Empowerment
- Councillor Angus Campbell, independent council leader of Comhairle nan Eilean Siar
- Rhondda Geekie, the Labour group leader on East Dunbartonshire Council
- Isobel d'Inverno, the convenor of the tax committee of the Law Society of Scotland
- Mary Kinninmonth, a manager at Citizens Advice Bureau in Dundee and member of the board of directors of Citizens Advice Scotland
- Dr Jim McCormick, from the Joseph Rowntree Foundation (JRF)
- Dr Angela O'Hagan, a research fellow in the Institute for Society and Social Justice Research
- David O'Neill, the president of COSLA
- Don Peebles, the head of Chartered Institute of Public Finance and Accountancy (CIPFA) Scotland
- Alex Rowley, the Labour MSP for Cowdenbeath
- Andy Wightman, from the Scottish Green Party
