= Aberdeen Central (Scottish Parliament constituency) =

Constituency of the Scottish Parliament

- Burgh constituency for the Scottish Parliament
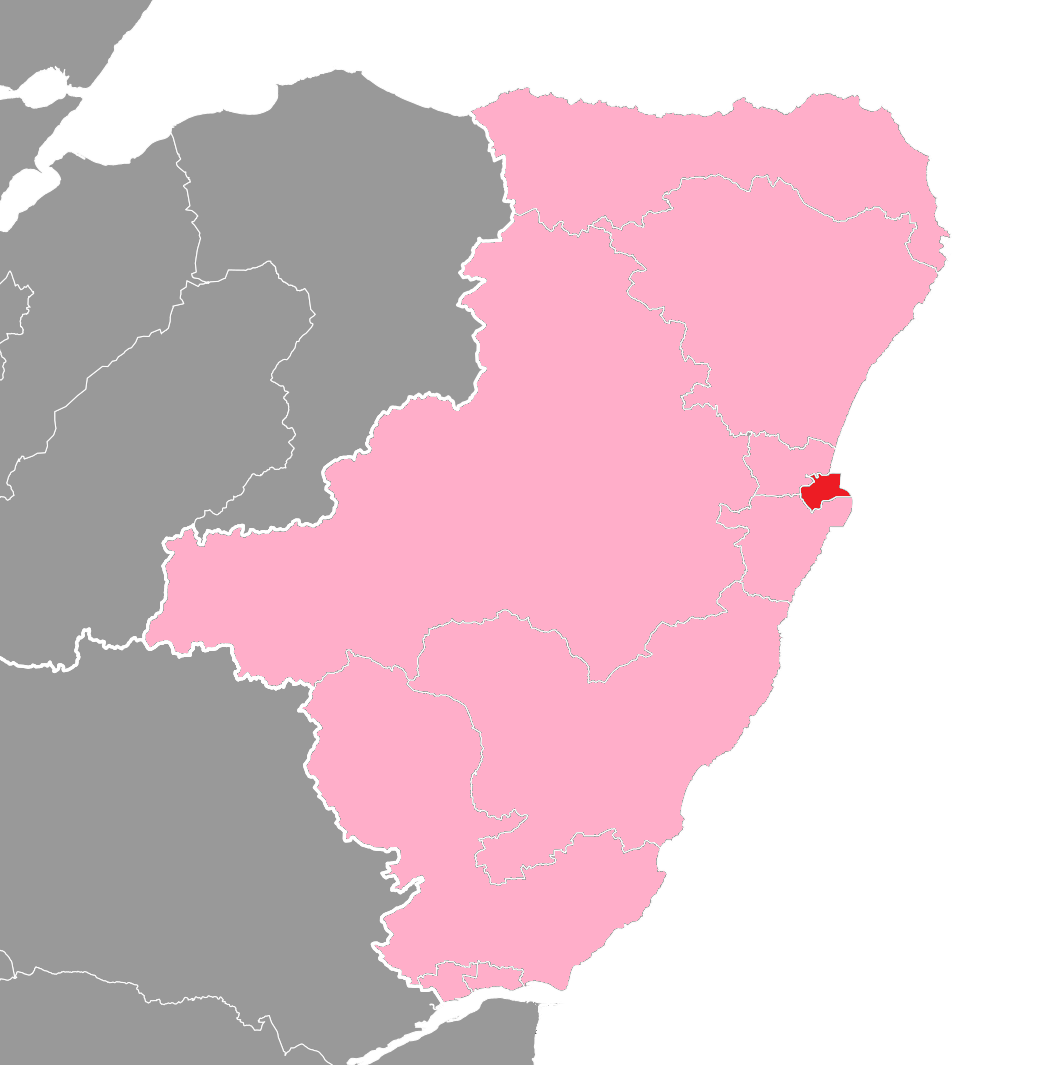

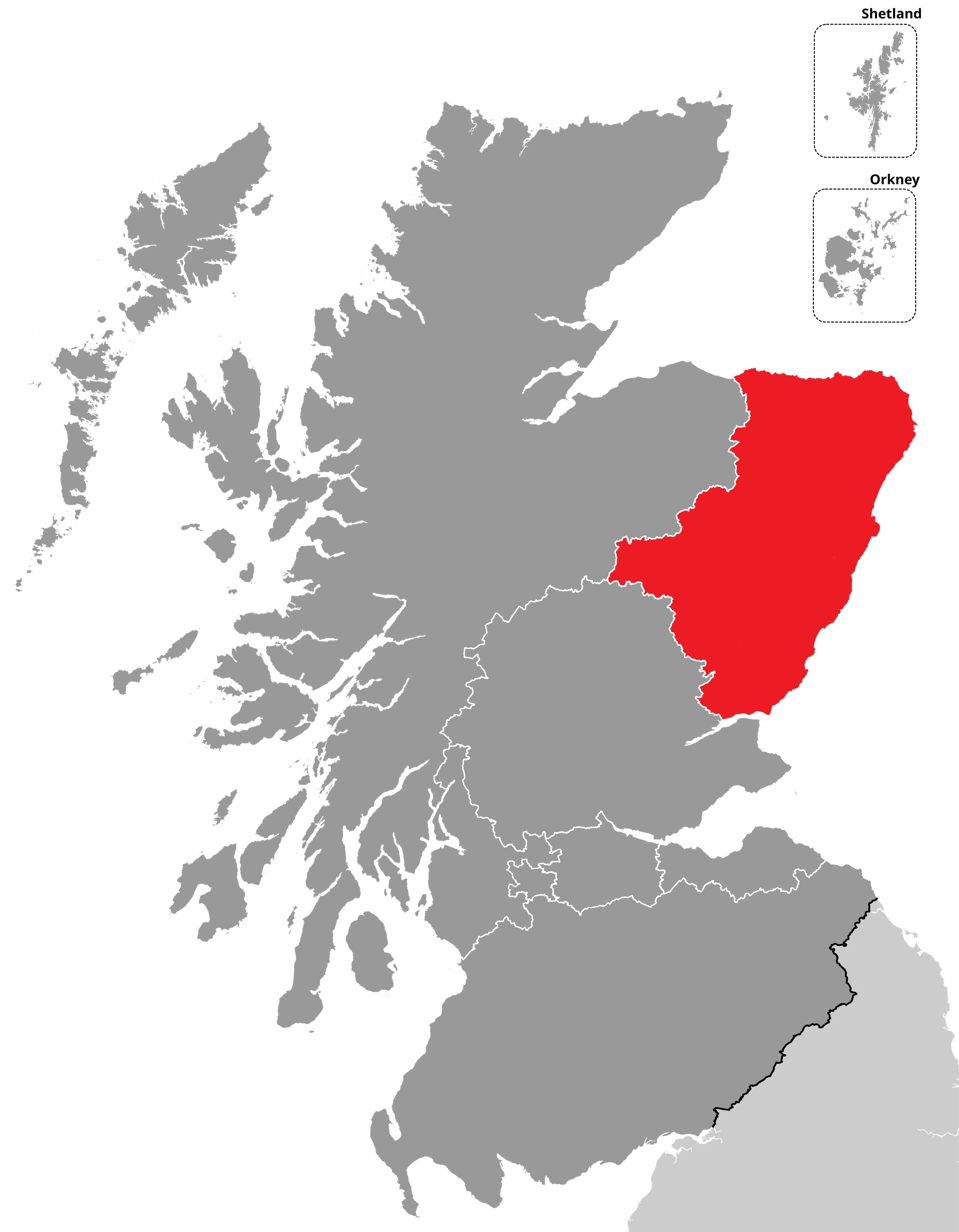
- Aberdeen Central shown within the North East Scotland electoral region and the region shown within Scotland
- Electoral region: North East Scotland
- Electorate: 57,939 (2026)

Current constituency
- Created: 1999
- Party: Scottish National Party
- MSP: Jack Middleton
- Council area: Aberdeen City

Aberdeen Central (Gaelic: Obar Dheathain Meadhain) is a burgh constituency of the Scottish Parliament covering part of the Aberdeen City council area. Under the additional-member electoral system used for elections to the Scottish Parliament, it elects one Member of the Scottish Parliament (MSP) by the first past the post method of election. It is also one of the ten constituencies in the North East Scotland electoral region, which elects seven additional member system, in addition to ten constituency MSPs, to produce a form of proportional representation for the region as a whole.

The seat has been held by Kevin Stewart of the Scottish National Party since the 2011 Scottish Parliament election.

== Electoral region ==
The other nine constituencies of the North East Scotland region are: Aberdeen Donside, Aberdeen Deeside and North Kincardine, Aberdeenshire East, Aberdeenshire West, Angus North and Mearns, Angus South, Banffshire and Buchan Coast, Dundee City East and Dundee City West. The region covers all of the Aberdeen City council area, the Aberdeenshire council area, the Angus council area, the Dundee City council area and part of the Moray council area.

== Constituency boundaries and council area ==
Boundary map of the constituency

The Aberdeen Central constituency was created at the same time as the Scottish Parliament, for the 1999 Scottish Parliament election, using the name and boundaries of the existing Aberdeen Central constituency of the UK Parliament. Ahead of the 2005 United Kingdom general election, the boundaries used for elections to the UK Parliament were altered, whilst initially being retained for elections to the Scottish Parliament. There is now no longer any link between the two sets of boundaries.

Following the first periodic review of Scottish Parliament boundaries ahead of the 2011 Scottish Parliament election, the Boundary Commission for Scotland created new seats for the Aberdeen City council area, which is now divided between three constituencies: Aberdeen Central, Aberdeen Donside and Aberdeen Deeside and North Kincardine. Central and Donside are entirely within the city area, while Deeside and North Kincardine also takes in North Kincardine in the Aberdeenshire council area.

In forming the Aberdeen Central ahead of the 2011 Scottish Parliament election, the following electoral wards of Aberdeen City Council were used to define the seat:

- In full:
  - Tillydrone/Seaton/Old Aberdeen
  - Midstocket/Rosemount
  - George Street/Harbour
- In part:
  - Hilton/Woodside/Stockethill (shared with Aberdeen Donside)
  - Hazlehead/Ashley/Queens Cross (shared with Aberdeen Deeside and North Kincardine)
  - Airyhall/Broomhill/Garthdee (shared with Aberdeen Deeside and North Kincardine)
  - Torry/Ferryhill (shared with Aberdeen Deeside and North Kincardine)

At the second periodic review of Scottish Parliament boundaries in 2025 the seat boundaries were left unchanged, and the seat continues to be formed of the same wards as at the first periodic review.

== Member of the Scottish Parliament ==
| Election | Member | Party |
|---|---|---|
| 1999 2003 2007 | Lewis Macdonald | Labour |
| 2011 2016 2021 | Kevin Stewart | SNP |
| 2026 | Jack Middleton | SNP |

== Election results ==
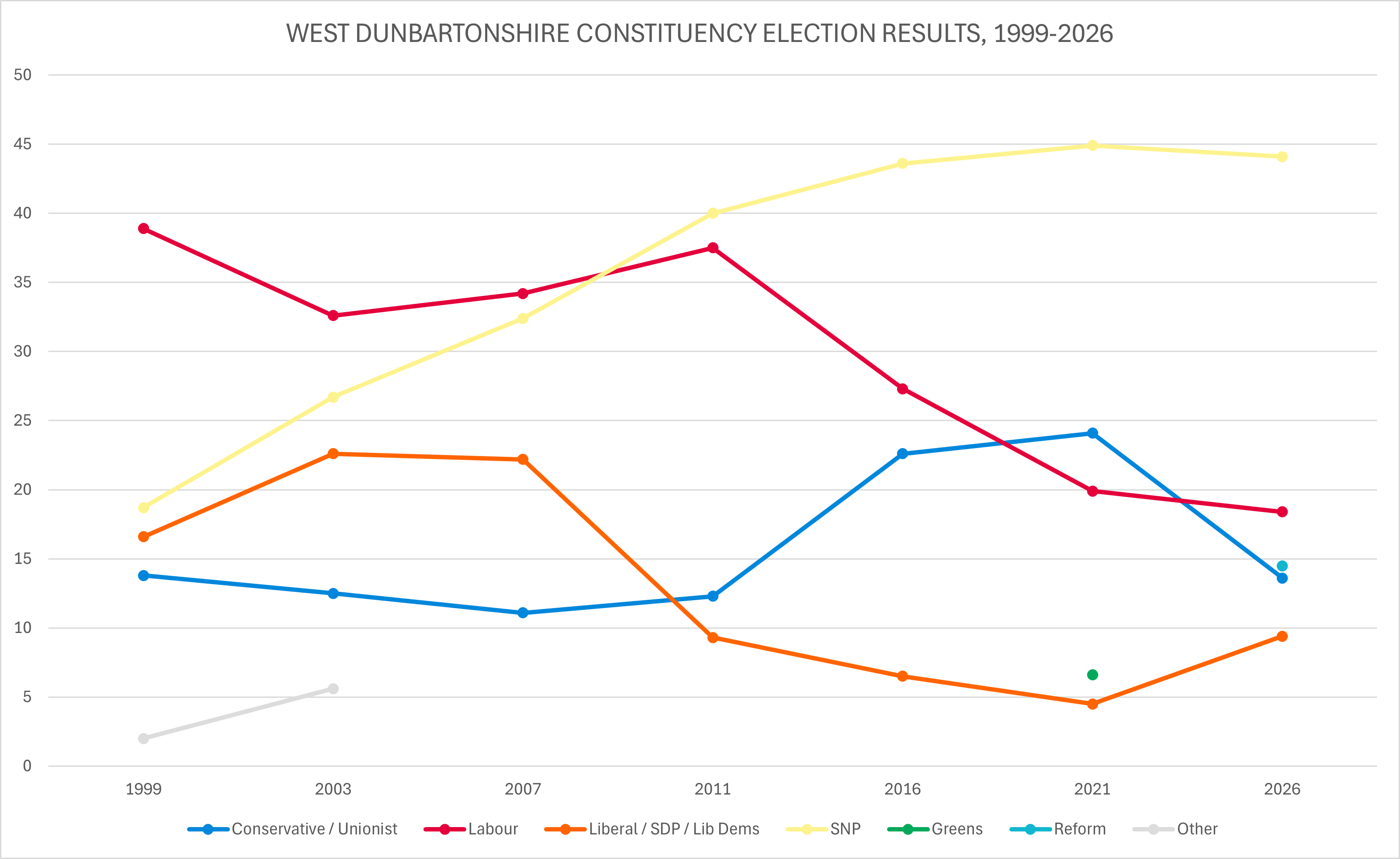
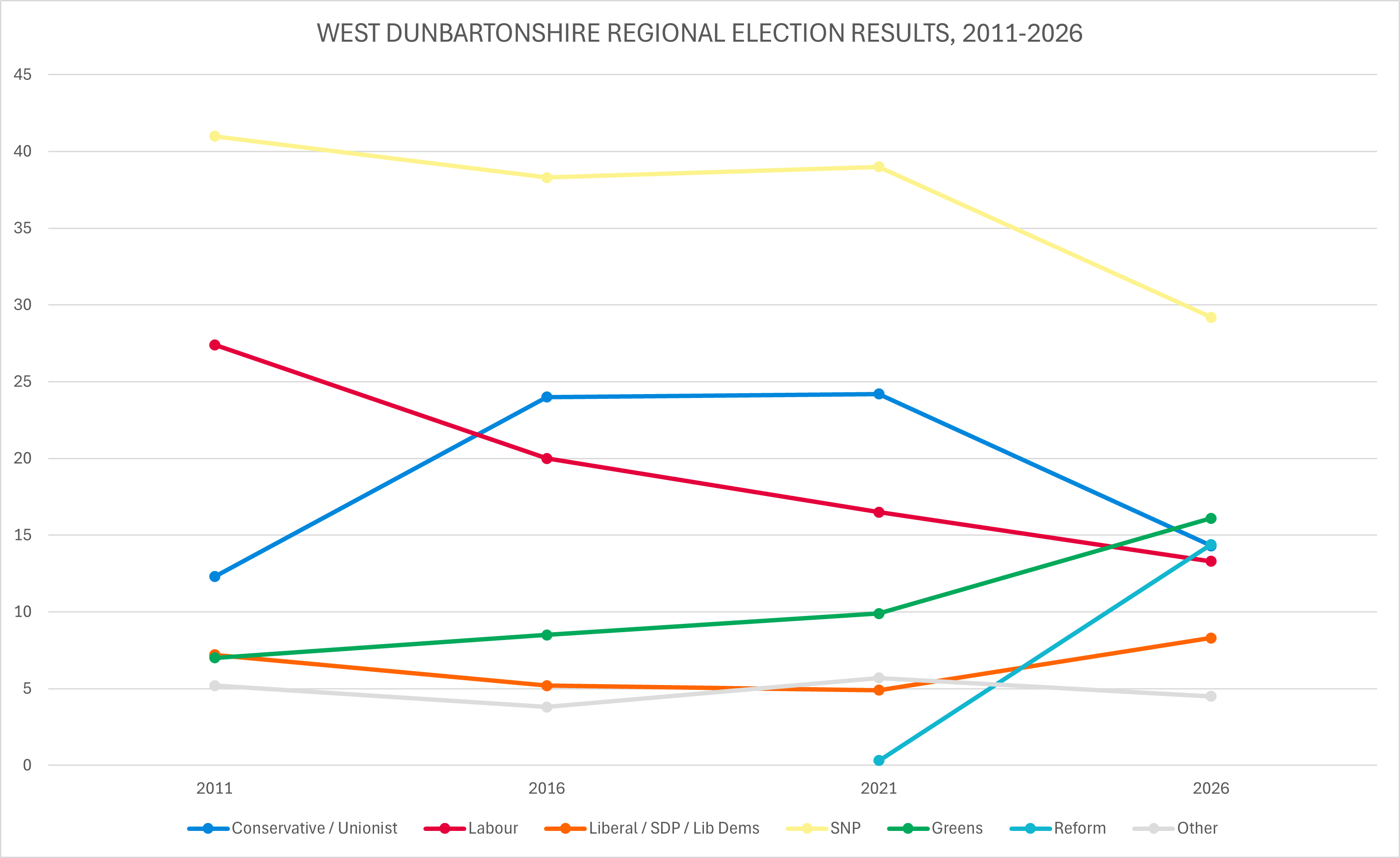

=== 2020s ===
2026 Scottish Parliament election: Aberdeen Central
| Party | Candidate | Constituency | | | Regional | | |
| Party | Candidate | Votes | % | ±% | Votes | % | ±% |
|---|---|---|---|---|---|---|---|
| SNP | Jack Middleton | 11,974 | 44.1 | ▼0.8 | 7,945 | 29.20 | ▼9.76 |
| Labour | Jenny Laing | 5,002 | 18.4 | ▼1.5 | 3,625 | 13.32 | ▼3.15 |
| Green | | | | | 4,383 | 16.11 | ▲6.25 |
| Reform | James Wyllie | 3,936 | 14.5 | New | 3,914 | 14.38 | ▲14.06 |
| Conservative | Stewart Whyte | 3,688 | 13.6 | ▼10.5 | 3,884 | 14.27 | ▼9.93 |
| Liberal Democrats | Yi-pei Chou Turvey (Note: Elected on the party list) | 2,563 | 9.4 | ▲4.9 | 2,246 | 8.25 | ▲3.36 |
| Independent Green Voice | | | | | 299 | 1.10 | ▲0.54 |
| Scottish Family | | | | | 229 | 0.84 | ▲0.11 |
| AtLS | | | | | 180 | 0.66 | New |
| ISP | | | | | 139 | 0.51 | New |
| Independent | Marie Boulton | | | | 128 | 0.47 | New |
| Scottish Socialist | | | | | 109 | 0.40 | New |
| Workers Party | | | | | 76 | 0.28 | New |
| Advance UK | | | | | 28 | 0.10 | New |
| Independent | Iris Leask | | | | 26 | 0.10 | New |
| Majority | | 6,972 | 25.7 | ▲4.9 | | | |
| Valid votes | | 27,163 | | | 27,211 | | |
| Invalid votes | | 165 | | | 74 | | |
| Turnout | | 27,328 | 47.2 | ▼8.7 | 27,285 | 47.1 | ▼8.7 |
| SNP hold | | Swing | | | | | |

2021 Scottish Parliament election: Aberdeen Central
| Party | Candidate | Constituency | | | Regional | | |
| Party | Candidate | Votes | % | ±% | Votes | % | ±% |
|---|---|---|---|---|---|---|---|
| SNP | Kevin Stewart (Note: Incumbent member for this constituency) | 14,217 | 44.9 | ▲1.3 | 12,333 | 38.96 | ▲0.7 |
| Conservative | Douglas Lumsden | 7,623 | 24.1 | ▲1.5 | 7,660 | 24.20 | ▲0.1 |
| Labour | Barry Black | 6,294 | 19.9 | ▼7.4 | 5,214 | 16.47 | ▼3.6 |
| Green | Guy Ingerson | 2,087 | 6.6 | New | 3,121 | 9.86 | ▲1.4 |
| Liberal Democrats | Desmond Bouse | 1,417 | 4.5 | ▼2.0 | 1,549 | 4.89 | ▼0.3 |
| Alba | | | | | 597 | 1.89 | New |
| Scottish Family | | | | | 231 | 0.73 | New |
| All for Unity | | | | | 221 | 0.70 | New |
| Independent Green Voice | | | | | 178 | 0.56 | New |
| Freedom Alliance (UK) | | | | | 133 | 0.42 | New |
| Abolish the Scottish Parliament | | | | | 100 | 0.32 | New |
| Reform | | | | | 100 | 0.32 | New |
| Scottish Libertarian | | | | | 81 | 0.26 | 0.0 |
| UKIP | | | | | 54 | 0.17 | ▼1.6 |
| Independent | Laura Marshall | | | | 34 | 0.11 | New |
| Restore Scotland | | | | | 33 | 0.10 | New |
| Independent | Geoffrey Farquharson | | | | 11 | 0.03 | New |
| Renew | | | | | 6 | 0.02 | New |
| Majority | | 6,594 | 20.8 | ▲4.5 | | | |
| Valid votes | | 31,638 | | | 31,656 | | |
| Invalid votes | | 139 | | | 76 | | |
| Turnout | | 31,777 | 55.9 | ▲9.0 | 37,732 | 55.8 | ▲8.8 |
| SNP hold | | Swing | | ▼0.1 | | | |

=== 2010s ===
2016 Scottish Parliament election: Aberdeen Central
| Party | Candidate | Constituency | | | Regional | | |
| Party | Candidate | Votes | % | ±% | Votes | % | ±% |
|---|---|---|---|---|---|---|---|
| SNP | Kevin Stewart (Note: Incumbent member for this constituency) | 11,648 | 43.6 | ▲3.6 | 10,269 | 38.3 | ▼2.7 |
| Labour | Lewis Macdonald (Note: Elected on the party list) | 7,299 | 27.3 | ▼10.2 | 5,381 | 20.0 | ▼7.3 |
| Conservative | Tom Mason | 6,022 | 22.6 | ▲10.2 | 6,466 | 24.0 | ▲11.8 |
| Green | | | | | 2,282 | 8.5 | ▲1.5 |
| Liberal Democrats | Kevin McLeod | 1,735 | 6.5 | ▼2.8 | 1,401 | 5.2 | ▼2.0 |
| UKIP | | | | | 478 | 1.7 | ▲1.0 |
| Scottish Christian | | | | | 208 | 0.8 | ▼0.1 |
| Solidarity | | | | | 88 | 0.4 | ▲0.2 |
| RISE | | | | | 75 | 0.3 | New |
| Scottish Libertarian | | | | | 65 | 0.2 | New |
| Communist | | | | | 60 | 0.2 | New |
| National Front | | | | | 60 | 0.2 | 0.0 |
| Majority | | 4,349 | 16.3 | ▲13.8 | | | |
| Valid votes | | 26,704 | | | 26,833 | | |
| Invalid votes | | 137 | | | 58 | | |
| Turnout | | 26,841 | 46.9 | ▲2.9 | 26,891 | 47.0 | ▲3.0 |
| SNP hold | | Swing | | ▲6.9 | | | |
Notes

2011 Scottish Parliament election: Aberdeen Central
| Party | Candidate | Constituency | | | Region | | |
| Party | Candidate | Votes | % | ±% | Votes | % | ±% |
|---|---|---|---|---|---|---|---|
| SNP | Kevin Stewart | 10,058 | 40.0 | N/A | 10,307 | 41.0 | N/A |
| Labour | Lewis MacDonald (Note: Incumbent member for this constituency) | 9,441 | 37.5 | N/A | 6,890 | 27.4 | N/A |
| Conservative | Sandy Wallace | 3,100 | 12.3 | N/A | 3,102 | 12.3 | N/A |
| Liberal Democrats | Sheila Thomson | 2,349 | 9.3 | N/A | 1,813 | 7.2 | N/A |
| Green | | | | | 1,754 | 7.0 | N/A |
| All-Scotland Pensioners Party | | | | | 301 | 1.2 | N/A |
| Scottish Christian | | | | | 210 | 0.8 | N/A |
| UKIP | | | | | 186 | 0.7 | N/A |
| Socialist Labour | | | | | 159 | 0.6 | N/A |
| BNP | | | | | 139 | 0.6 | N/A |
| Scottish Socialist | | | | | 133 | 0.5 | N/A |
| National Front | Mike Phillips | 201 | 0.8 | N/A | 63 | 0.3 | N/A |
| Solidarity | | | | | 29 | 0.1 | N/A |
| Angus Independents | | | | | 2 | 0.0 | N/A |
| Others | | | | | 69 | 0.3 | N/A |
| Majority | | 617 | 2.5 | N/A | | | |
| Valid votes | | 25,149 | | | 25,157 | | |
| Invalid votes | | 136 | | | 86 | | |
| Turnout | | 25,285 | 44.1 | N/A | 25,243 | 44.0 | N/A |
| SNP win (new boundaries) | | | | | | | |

=== 2000s ===
2007 Scottish Parliament election: Aberdeen Central
| Party | Candidate | Votes | % | ±% |
|---|---|---|---|---|
| Labour | Lewis Macdonald | 7,232 | 34.2 | +1.6 |
| SNP | Karen Shirron | 6,850 | 32.4 | +5.7 |
| Liberal Democrats | John Stewart | 4,693 | 22.2 | −0.4 |
| Conservative | Andrew Jones | 2,345 | 11.1 | −1.4 |
| Majority | | 382 | 1.8 | −4.1 |
| Turnout | | 21,120 | 45.3 | +2.9 |
| Labour hold | | Swing | | |

2003 Scottish Parliament election: Aberdeen Central
| Party | Candidate | Votes | % | ±% |
|---|---|---|---|---|
| Labour | Lewis Macdonald | 6,835 | 32.6 | −6.3 |
| SNP | Richard Lochhead | 5,593 | 26.7 | −2.0 |
| Liberal Democrats | Eleanor Anderson | 4,744 | 22.6 | +6.0 |
| Conservative | Alan Butler | 2,616 | 12.5 | −1.3 |
| Scottish Socialist | Andy Cumbers | 1,176 | 5.6 | +3.6 |
| Majority | | 1,242 | 5.9 | −4.3 |
| Turnout | | 20,964 | 42.4 | |
| Labour hold | | Swing | | |

=== 1990s ===
1999 Scottish Parliament election: Aberdeen Central
| Party | Candidate | Votes | % | ±% |
|---|---|---|---|---|
| Labour | Lewis Macdonald | 10,305 | 38.9 | N/A |
| SNP | Richard Lochhead | 7,609 | 28.7 | N/A |
| Liberal Democrats | Eleanor Anderson | 4,403 | 16.6 | N/A |
| Conservative | Tom Mason | 3,655 | 13.8 | N/A |
| Scottish Socialist | Andy Cumbers | 523 | 2.0 | N/A |
| Majority | | 2,696 | 10.2 | N/A |
| Turnout | | 26,495 | | N/A |
| Labour win (new seat) | | | | |

== See also ==
- Aberdeen City Youth Council
