= Lewis Macdonald =

Scottish Labour politician

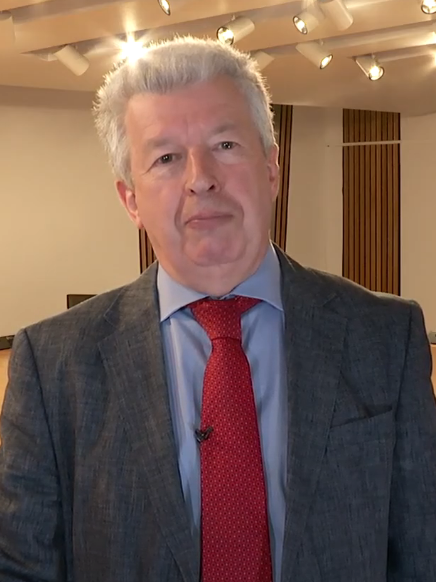
- Macdonald in 2018

Deputy Presiding Officer of the Scottish Parliament
- Interim; 1 April 2020 – 14 May 2021 Serving with Linda Fabiani and Christine Grahame
- Presiding Officer: Ken Macintosh
- Succeeded by: Liam McArthur

Convener of the Health and Sport Committee
- In office 19 December 2017 – 4 May 2021
- Preceded by: Neil Findlay
- Succeeded by: Gillian Martin
Parliamentary offices
Member of the Scottish Parliament for North East Scotland (1 of 7 Regional MSPs)
In office 5 May 2011 – 5 May 2021
Member of the Scottish Parliament for Aberdeen Central
In office 6 May 1999 – 22 March 2011
Preceded by	Constituency established
Succeeded by	Kevin Stewart

Scottish Labour portfolios
- 2013–2014: Chief Whip of the Scottish Labour Party
- 2016–2017: Shadow Cabinet Secretary for Culture, Sport, Tourism and External Affairs

Personal details
- Born: Roderick Lewis Macdonald; 1 January 1957 (age 69) Stornoway, Outer Hebrides, Scotland
- Party: Scottish Labour
- Spouse: Sandra Macdonald
- Children: 2 daughters
- Education: University of Aberdeen

Roderick Lewis Macdonald (born 1 January 1957) is a Scottish politician who was a Member of the Scottish Parliament (MSP) for the North East Scotland region between 2011 and 2021. A member of Scottish Labour, he previously represented the Aberdeen Central constituency from 1999 to 2011. He was a deputy Scottish Executive minister from 2001 to 2007.

== Early life and career ==
Born in Stornoway, Macdonald moved with his family to Aberdeenshire as a child, and attended Inverurie Academy and later the University of Aberdeen. Macdonald received an MA in history and a PhD in African studies and later lectured at the university. He is a member of the trade union Unite.

== Political career ==
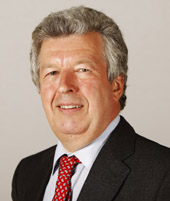
Official parliamentary portrait, 2011

Macdonald unsuccessfully contested the Moray UK Parliament constituency at the 1997 general election. Prior to his election as an MSP, he worked as a parliamentary researcher to the MPs Frank Doran and Tom Clarke. After being elected in the 1999 Scottish Parliament election, Macdonald joined the Scottish Executive in March 2001. He was briefly Deputy Minister for Transport and Planning from March to November 2001. He then served as Deputy Minister for Enterprise, Transport and Lifelong Learning, later renamed Deputy Minister for Enterprise and Lifelong Learning, from 2001 to 2004. He served as Deputy Minister for Environment and Rural Development from 2004 to 2005 and Deputy Minister for Health and Community Care from 2005 to 2007.

Between June 2013 and December 2014, Macdonald served as Scottish Labour Chief Whip. He has also led for Scottish Labour on enterprise and tourism, infrastructure, justice and energy. He has served as convener of the Health and Sport Committee from December 2017 to May 2021. He became interim Deputy Presiding Officer of the Scottish Parliament in April 2020, following the self isolation of Christine Grahame during the COVID-19 pandemic.

Macdonald nominated Anas Sarwar in the 2021 Scottish Labour leadership election. He stood down at the 2021 Scottish Parliament election.

== Personal life ==
Macdonald is married to Sandra who has worked in the oil industry. Macdonald also has two children. Sandra was a member of the Aberdeen City Council in 2017.

Scottish Parliament
New parliament Scotland Act 1998	Member of the Scottish Parliament for Aberdeen Central; 1999–2011	Succeeded by Kevin Stewart
Political offices
Preceded by Rhona Brankin	Deputy Minister for Health and Community Care; 2005–2007	Succeeded by Shona Robison as Minister for Public Health
Preceded by Allan Wilson	Deputy Minister for Environment and Rural Development; 2004–2005	Succeeded by Rhona Brankin
New office	Deputy Minister for Enterprise and Lifelong Learning; 2003–2004	Succeeded by Allan Wilson
New office	Deputy Minister for Enterprise, Transport and Lifelong Learning; 2001–2003	Succeeded by Alasdair Morrison
New office	Deputy Minister for Transport and Planning; 2001	Office abolished
