= Scottish Human Rights Commission =

- Scottish Gaelic: Coimisean Còraichean Daonna na h-Alba

Agency overview
- Formed: 1 April 2008
- Jurisdiction: Scottish Government
- Headquarters: Bridgeside House, 99 McDonald Road, Edinburgh, Scotland
- Employees: 17
- Annual budget: £1.2 million (FY 21/22)
- Agency executives: Angela O'Hagan, Chair; Shelley Gray, Commissioner; Jim Farish, Commissioner; Claire Methven O'Brien, Commissioner
- Parent agency: Scottish Parliamentary Corporate Body
- Key document: Scottish Commission for Human Rights Act 2006
- Website: https://scottishhumanrights.com

The Scottish Human Rights Commission (SHRC) (Scottish Gaelic: Coimisean Còraichean Daonna na h-Alba) is the national human rights institution for Scotland. It was established by the Scottish Commission for Human Rights Act 2006 (asp 16) and started its work in 2008. The Commission is independent of the Scottish and UK Government, and of Parliament.

It seeks to promote and protect the human rights of everyone in Scotland, working to increase awareness, recognition and respect for human rights, and make them more relevant and easier to apply in everyday life. The Commission aims to help everyone understand their rights and the shared responsibilities everyone has to each other and to their community.

The SHRC is a Scottish Parliamentary Corporate Body (SPCB) supported body meaning that it is separate and independent from Government but still accountable for its public funds. It has an office in Edinburgh, which is shared with the fellow SPCB supported bodies the Scottish Public Services Ombudsman and the Children and Young People's Commissioner Scotland.

The Scottish Human Rights Commission is the newest of the three national human rights institutions (NHRIs) in the United Kingdom and, like the Northern Ireland Human Rights Commission (NIHRC) and the Equality and Human Rights Commission (EHRC), it has secured "A status" accreditation from the International Co-ordinating Committee of NHRIs (the ICC). The Scottish Parliament, when establishing the Commission in 2008, ensured that it complied with United Nations Principles Related to the Status of National Institutions, known as the Paris Principles – a series of recommendations on the role, status and functions of NHRIs. The Commission has a strong international profile and participates in the Universal Periodic Review reporting mechanisms for UN treaty processes. In October 2010 it hosted the biennial world conference of NHRIs in Edinburgh.

The Commission was elected as chair of the European Group of National Human Rights Institutions on 17 May 2011. It was re-elected to this post in May 2013

== Mandate and powers ==
Scottish Commission for Human Rights Act 2006 (Note: Section 22(1).)
- Act of the Scottish Parliament
- Scottish Parliament
- Long title: An Act of the Scottish Parliament to provide for the establishment and functions of the Scottish Commission for Human Rights.
- Citation: 2006 asp 16
- Territorial extent: Scotland

Dates
- Royal assent: 8 December 2006
- Commencement: various (Note: Section 22(3).)
Other legislation
Amends	Scottish Public Services Ombudsman Act 2002
Amended by	Inquiries into Fatal Accidents and Sudden Deaths etc. (Scotland) Act 2016; United Nations Convention on the Rights of the Child (Incorporation) (Scotland) Act 2024

Status: Amended

Text of statute as originally enacted

Text of the Scottish Commission for Human Rights Act 2006 as in force today (including any amendments) within the United Kingdom, from legislation.gov.uk.

The Scottish Commission for Human Rights Act 2006 (asp 16) states that the commission has a duty 'to promote human rights and, in particular, to encourage best practice in relation to human rights'.

The commission generally deals only with issues relating to devolved matters only, with issues concerning equality and some non-devolved human rights matters being the responsibility of the Equality and Human Rights Commission. The two NHRIs have a memorandum of understanding which set out the expectations and terms and conditions of the working relationship between organisations.

The commission must lay annually before the Scottish Parliament a general report on the exercise of its functions during the year.

The Commission, NIHRC and EHRC participate with the Equality Commission for Northern Ireland in the "independent mechanism" to promote, protect and monitor implementation in the UK of the UN Convention on the Rights of Persons with Disabilities.

To deliver this mandate, the legislation sets out these powers:

- The power to conduct inquiries into the policies or practices of Scottish public authorities working to deliver a particular service, or public authorities of a particular description.
- The ability to provide education, training and awareness raising, and by publishing research.
- Recommending such changes to Scottish law, policy and practice as it considers necessary.
- The power to enter some places of detention as part of an inquiry, and the power to intervene in civil court cases where relevant to the promotion of human right and where the case appears to raise a matter of public interest.

It cannot provide assistance to any person in connection with a legal claim.

== Leadership ==
The current chair of the commission is Angela O'Hagan, who was appointed in August 2024.

Chairs
Name	Tenure	Notes
Angela O'Hagan	2024–present	
Ian Duddy	2022–2023	
Judith Robertson	2016–2022	
Alan Miller	2008–2016	

There are also three part-time Commissioners, appointed in late 2022.

Commissioners
Name	Tenure	Notes
Aaliya Seyal	2025-present	
Rosemary Agnew	2025-present	
Shelley Gray	2022–present	
Jim Farish	2022–present	
Claire Methven O'Brien	2022–present	
Dr Anna Black	2021-2022	
Susan Kemp	2015-2022	
Jane-Claire Judson	2017-2022	
Alan Mitchell	2015-2021	
Dr Jacqueline Kinghan	2021-2022	
Matt Smith	2010-2017	
Prof. Kay Hampton	2008-2015	
Shelagh McCall	2008-2015	

== Work of the Commission ==
The Commission is currently working from its Strategic Plan 2020-2024. It has 4 priorities for this time:

1. Progressing understanding and strengthening legal protection of economic, social and cultural rights;
2. Strengthening accountability for meeting human rights obligations;
3. Building wider ownership of human rights;
4. Advancing best practice locally and sharing our learning globally

The work of the Commission focuses on implementing a human-rights–based approach at the heart of policy choices and practice in Scotland to ensure that human rights are at the centre of how organisations in Scotland work, as well as how they measure success.

=== Scotland's National Action Plan for Human Rights (SNAP) ===
Scotland's National Action Plan for Human Rights (SNAP) was launched on International Human Rights Day, 10 December 2013. The Commission said 'it sets out a bold roadmap towards a Scotland where everyone can live with human dignity.'

A second SNAP began development in 2017. While initially planned to be published in 2020, the COVID-19 pandemic lead to a two year delay. In 2021 the Scottish Government and the Commission jointly began to prepare to convene a Leadership Panel to finish development work, and appointed a Secretariat Lead to support this. The Leadership Panel was appointed in March 2022, and is currently developing the Action Plan.

=== Care About Rights ===
This project aims to increase awareness, understanding and confidence in the care sector about human rights in order to improve conditions for those in care and for their carers. Particular emphasis has been placed on the needs of older people through a training package called "Care about Rights".

=== Historical Child Abuse ===
In February 2010 the Commission published a comprehensive human rights framework to address historic child abuse through an Acknowledgement and Accountability Forum. The framework was positively received by many survivors and international experts. The Commission worked with the Centre for Excellence for Looked After Children in Scotland to deliver a series of InterActions with to develop an Action Plan on Justice and Remedies. The Commission continues to monitor the process of acknowledgement and accountability in Scotland and the implementation of its recommendations.

=== Human Rights Impact Assessments ===
The Commission has developed training materials on human rights for staff in local authorities, as part of its power to duty to provide training.

In January 2010 the Commission piloted human rights training for staff within the Services for Communities Division of the City of Edinburgh Council. Research was also conducted into international best practice and experiences of carrying out human rights impact assessments. In 2013 the Commission piloted a joint Equalities and Human Rights Impact Assessment with two partner organisations, Fife and Renfrewshire Councils.

The project will begin by establishing an understanding of current practices and approaches to assessing equality and human rights impacts, and develop appropriate means for the partner organisations to move beyond the legal requirement to carry out equality impact assessment towards having the capability to assess equality and human rights impacts together. The pilot bodies will contribute to the development of ideas and also to the road-testing of such approaches.

== Emerging human rights issues ==
=== Business and human rights ===
In 2010 the Commission contributed to the work of the Working Group of the International Coordinating Committee of National Human Rights Institutions on Business and Human Rights by drafting a survey for all institutions on their interests, needs and capacities in the area. The Commission also provided written and oral evidence to the UK Parliament Joint Committee on Human Rights inquiry on Business and Human Rights.

In October 2010 the Commission hosted the International Conference of National Human Rights Institutions on the theme of Business and Human Rights. The conference agreed the Edinburgh Declaration, which sets an action plan for NHRIs on business and human rights.

=== Planned replacement of the Human Rights Act ===
In 2009, the Conservative party, then the main UK opposition party, announced that, if elected, it would repeal the Human Rights Act 1998 and replace it with a Bill of Rights. In March 2010 the Commission published two statements, including one co-signed with the NIHRC, calling for the preservation of the Act and emphasising that human rights would be best protected by building on the Act instead of replacing it.

The Deputy Prime Minister of the United Kingdom, Dominic Raab introduced the Bill of Rights Bill in 2021 to the House of Commons which would replace the Human Rights Act. The Commission has said the proposals would 'weaken the protections in the Human Rights Act and put the UK in breach of its international obligations.' Along with several Scottish civil society organisations, the Commission condemned the Bill claiming it is unneeded and a step backwards.

== International activities ==
The Commission is one of over 80 NHRIs within the ICC's global network supported by the United Nations Office of the High Commissioner for Human Rights. In June 2010 the Commission was given "A status" accreditation by the ICC; this gives it enhanced access to treaty bodies and other UN mechanisms. Along with the NIHRC and EHRC the SHRC participates in the European Group of NHRIs. The SHRC is currently the chair of the European Group.

=== Interaction with other NHRIs ===
In June 2009 the Commission hosted the first joint meeting of the four national human rights institutions of the UK and Ireland; the Equality and Human Rights Commission, the Irish Human Rights Commission, the NIHRC and, of course, the Scottish Commission. Justice Albie Sachs, a former justice of the South African Constitutional Court, also participated in the meeting.

In October 2010 the Commission hosted the 10th International Conference of National Human Rights Institutions at the Scottish Parliament, bringing together delegates from over 80 countries to discuss issues around Business and Human Rights. The conference ended with the agreement of the Edinburgh Declaration.

=== Interaction with the United Nations ===
The Commission frequently makes submissions to the Treaty bodies of the United Nations framework. The reports provide a critique of law, policy and practice in Scotland. The SHRC, along with the other UK NHRIs submits evidence to the Universal Periodic Review process of the UK. The Commission has been noted in recent years as being particularly engaged amongst British institutions with the process.

In June 2009 the Commission was appointed a member of the UK's independent mechanism responsible for promoting, monitoring and protecting the implementation of the Convention on the Rights of Persons with Disabilities.
