= Angela O'Hagan =

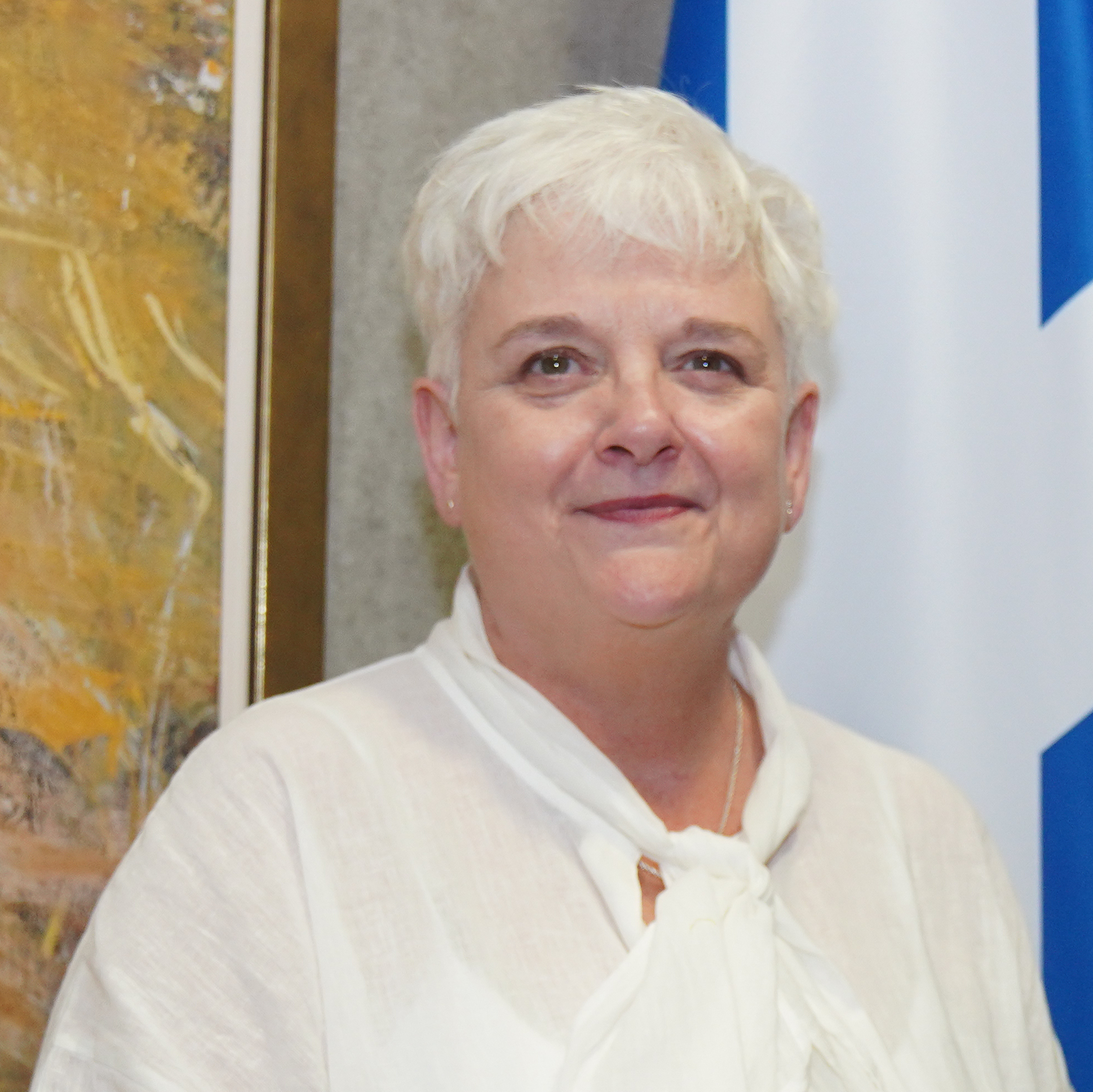
- at the Scottish parliament
- Employer: Glasgow Caledonian University
- Known for: chair of the Scottish Human Rights Commission
- Predecessor: Ian Duddy

Angela O'Hagan is a Scottish academic. She became the chair of the Scottish Human Rights Commission in 2024. She is the Professor of Equality and Public Policy at Glasgow Caledonian University. She is an expert in gender budgeting.

== Career ==
She worked for the Equal Opportunities Commission and Carers Scotland. She served as Head of Communications at Oxfam Scotland.

She has campaigned as chair of the Scottish Make Poverty History campaign. In 2005, she helped organise the G8 Summit March and rally in Edinburgh. More than 220,000 people marched in support of Make Poverty History in Edinburgh on 2 July. It was reported as the largest demonstration in Scottish history.

In 2013, she achieved her doctorate in gender budgeting in Scotland and Spain.

O'Hagan was an academic at Glasgow Caledonian University, where she became the Professor of Equality and Public Policy She created a Human Rights Master's course after leading the similar masters course in citizenship and human rights.

She was nominated as the new chair of the Scottish Human Rights Commission in May 2024 and she assumed the half-time role in August.

== Publications ==
In 2018, Gender Budgeting in Europe: Developments and Challenges was published. It was edited by O'Hagan and Elizabeth Klatzer.

== Awards ==
In 2019, she was given the Jo Cox Award for Public Service and Activity Citizenship at the Political Studies Association annual event.
