= Allan Wilson (politician) =

Scottish politician (born 1954)

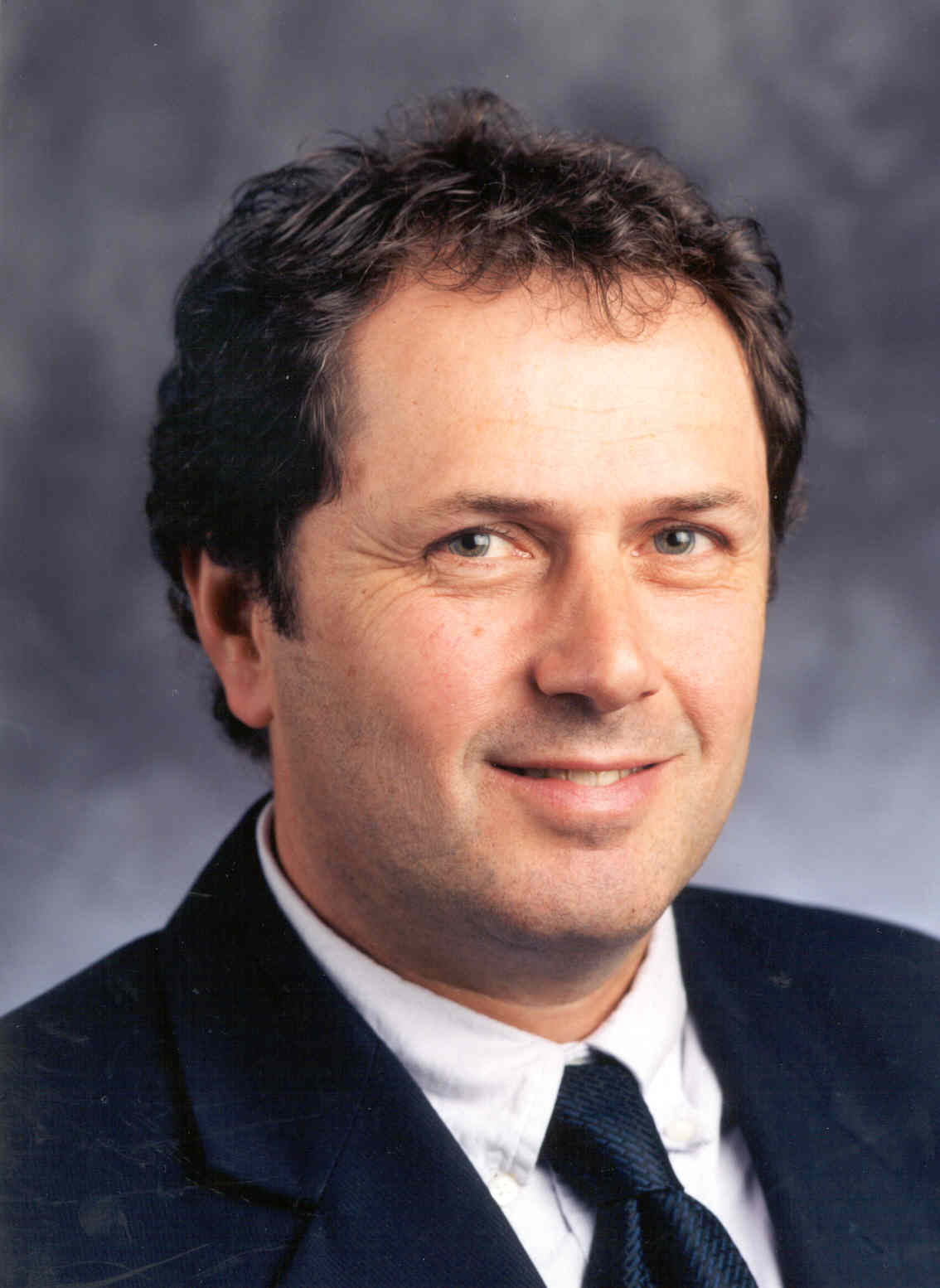
- Official portrait of Wilson

Member of the Scottish Parliament for Cunninghame North
- In office 6 May 1999 – 2 April 2007
- Preceded by: New Parliament
- Succeeded by: Kenny Gibson

Personal details
- Born: 5 August 1954 (age 71)
- Party: Scottish Labour

Allan Wilson (born 5 August 1954) is a former Scottish Labour Party politician. He was a Member of the Scottish Parliament (MSP) for the Cunninghame North constituency, a seat which he held from the inaugural Scottish Parliament general election in 1999 until his defeat at the 2007 election.

He was educated at Glengarnock Primary school and at Spier's school near Beith, Ayrshire, and worked as a trades union official with NUPE and UNISON until his election to the Scottish Parliament. He was a member of the Executive of the Scottish Labour Party from 1992 until 1999 and election agent for Brian Wilson.

He was Labour lead on the Scottish Parliament's Enterprise and Lifelong Learning Committee and also a member of the European Committee prior to becoming Deputy Minister for Tourism, Culture and Sport in October 2000 and then Deputy Minister for Environment and Rural Development in November 2001 in the Scottish Executive. In October 2004 he was appointed Deputy Minister for Enterprise and Lifelong Learning.

He is married, has two sons, and lives in Kilbirnie. He was a member of the Scottish Parliamentary football team, current holders of the four nations' Parliamentary Trophy (Parliamentary Shield) and Chairman of Kilbirnie Community Football Club comprising 15 teams and for over thirty years a former player, coach and manager of various Ayrshire juvenile, amateur and junior teams in the Scottish Junior Football Association, Scottish Amateur Football Association and the Scottish Football Association.

In 2006, Wilson was criticised for remarks he made using the term "attempted rape" to describe talks between the SNP and Scottish Greens. He initially denied his comments were unacceptable but later apologised to MSPs.

In the 2007 Scottish Parliament Election he lost his seat Cunninghame North to the Scottish National Party's Kenny Gibson, by only 48 votes in an election with over a thousand spoilt ballot papers, making it the most marginal seat in the country. Wilson originally wished to challenge the result via a recount but the Scottish Labour Party, following advice from their solicitors, did not proceed with an election petition on his behalf.

In 2008, Wilson was characterised as a whinger by SNP MSP Kenneth Gibson for comments he made about the 2007 count and the presiding officer, who he had called "a clown."

In the 2011 election, Wilson again stood against Gibson for the Cunninghame North seat, but this time lost more emphatically, with Gibson's majority increasing from 48 to 6,117.

== See also ==
- List of Scottish Executive Ministerial Teams

Scottish Parliament
New parliament Scotland Act 1998	Member of the Scottish Parliament for Cunninghame North; 1999–2007	Succeeded by Kenny Gibson
Political offices
Preceded by Lewis Macdonald	Deputy Minister for Enterprise and Lifelong Learning; 2004–2007	Office abolished
Preceded by Rhona Brankin	Deputy Minister for Environment and Rural Development; 2001–2004	Succeeded by Lewis Macdonald
Preceded by Rhona Brankin	Deputy Minister for Culture and Sport; 2000–2001	Succeeded by Elaine Murray as Deputy Minister for Tourism, Culture and Sport
