= Kevin Stewart (Scottish politician) =

Scottish politician

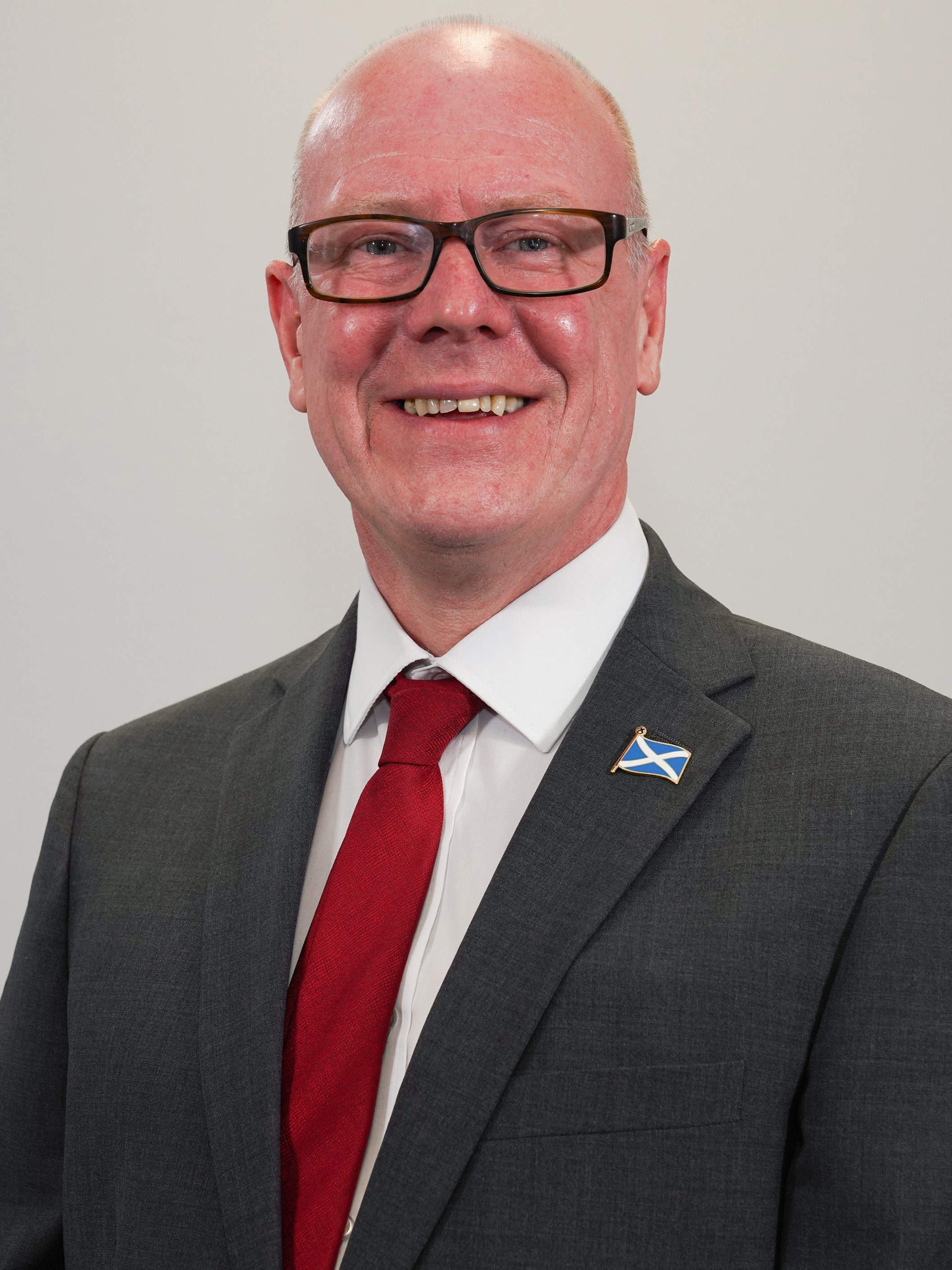
- Official portrait, 2021

Minister for Transport
- In office 29 March 2023 – 6 June 2023
- First Minister: Humza Yousaf
- Preceded by: Jenny Gilruth
- Succeeded by: Fiona Hyslop

Minister for Mental Wellbeing and Social Care
- In office 20 May 2021 – 29 March 2023
- First Minister: Nicola Sturgeon
- Preceded by: Clare Haughey
- Succeeded by: Maree Todd

Minister for Local Government, Housing and Planning
- In office 18 May 2016 – 20 May 2021
- First Minister: Nicola Sturgeon
- Preceded by: Marco Biagi & Margaret Burgess
- Succeeded by: Ben Macpherson

Member of the Scottish Parliament for Aberdeen Central
- In office 5 May 2011 – 9 April 2026
- Preceded by: Lewis Macdonald
- Succeeded by: Jack Middleton

Personal details
- Born: Kevin Morrice Stewart; 3 June 1968 (age 58) Aberdeen, Scotland
- Party: Scottish National Party
- Education: University of Aberdeen

Kevin Morrice Stewart (born 3 June 1968) is a Scottish National Party (SNP) politician who served as Minister for Transport from March 2023 to June 2023. He served as a Member of the Scottish Parliament (MSP) for Aberdeen Central from 2011 to 2026. He previously served as Minister for Mental Wellbeing and Social Care from 2021 to 2023 and as Minister for Local Government, Housing and Planning from 2016 to 2021.

== Political career ==
Stewart was a local councillor in Aberdeen between 1999 and 2011, serving as Depute Leader of Aberdeen City Council from 2007. As a councillor, he chaired the Finance and Resources Committee and the North East of Scotland's Regional Transport Partnership, NESTRANS. He also served as the chair of the 3Rs Board.

=== Member of the Scottish Parliament ===
In the 2011 Scottish Parliament election he was elected to represent Aberdeen Central.

Stewart was the convener of the Scottish Parliament's Local Government and Regeneration Committee, where he oversaw scrutiny of the Community Empowerment (Scotland) Act 2015. Stewart was also a member of the Welfare Reform Committee and also sat on the Justice Sub-committee on Policing. He was also involved in the Cross-Party Groups on Oil & Gas, Scots language, Nuclear Disarmament, Malawi and Tibet. He also acted as Parliamentary Liaison Officer to Nicola Sturgeon from November 2014 until the dissolution of parliament in March 2016.

Stewart has lodged a number of motions in parliament in support of Votes at 16.

He made a speech in favour of same-sex marriage on 20 November 2013 at the Scottish Parliament Stage 1 Debate on the Marriage and Civil Partnership (Scotland) Bill, in which he spoke about his experience of coming out as gay.

Stewart stood again in 2016 and was re-elected with an increased majority. He was appointed as Minister for Local Government and Housing on 18 May 2016 when Sturgeon announced her government.

He was re-elected at the 2021 Scottish Parliament election. He became Transport minister in the Yousaf government. In June 2023, he resigned as minister due to mental health problems. On 8 September 2025, he announced he will not seek re-election in the 2026 Scottish Parliament election, and was succeeded by Special adviser Jack Middleton.

Scottish Parliament
Preceded by Lewis Macdonald	Member of the Scottish Parliament for Aberdeen Central; 2011–2026	Succeeded by Jack Middleton
