= Andy Wightman =

Scottish writer (born 1963)

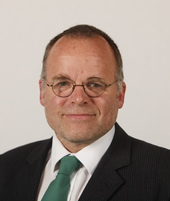

Member of the Scottish Parliament for Lothian
- In office 5 May 2016 – 5 May 2021

Personal details
- Born: Andrew Dearg Wightman; 1963 (age 62–63) Dundee, Scotland
- Party: Independent (2020–present)
- Other political affiliations: Scottish Greens (2009–2020)
- Education: University of Aberdeen
- Occupation: writer
- Website: andywightman.scot

Andrew Dearg Wightman (born 1963) is a Scottish Independent politician, who served as a Member of the Scottish Parliament (MSP) for the Lothian region from 2016 to 2021. He was elected as a member of the Scottish Greens, but resigned from the party in 2020 and served out the rest of his term as an independent. He is also a writer and researcher best known for his work on land ownership in Scotland. He is the author of Who Owns Scotland (1996) and The Poor Had No Lawyers (2010).

== Background ==
Wightman was born in Dundee. He graduated from the University of Aberdeen in 1985 with a degree in forestry. He was a co-founder of Reforesting Scotland, an environmental charity dedicated to substantial reforestation and the promotion of a sustainable forest culture.

He began his career as a scientist working on renewable energy at the University of Aberdeen and then as a Projects Officer with Central Scotland Countryside Trust. He was appointed as the first development officer of Reforesting Scotland in 1991. He became a self-employed writer and researcher in 1993. Over the next 20 years, he contributed to a wide range of debates on land use, land reform, the Crown estate, common good land, local democracy and fiscal reform. Author of a number of reports on these topics, he also served as a Specialist Adviser to the UK Parliament's Scottish Affairs Committee Inquiry on land reform 2014–2015.

He appeared in the documentary You've Been Trumped (2011), which dealt with Donald Trump's controversial golf course development at Balmedie, Aberdeenshire where he advised Michael Forbes on his land dispute with Trump, as well as the 2016 sequel You've Been Trumped Too.

He was coordinator of the Land Action Scotland campaign. The campaign has the stated aim of supporting local residents through seeking to democratise companies that are run by a handful of people who are not living on the land involved.

In February 2015, Wightman was announced as being a member of the Commission on Local Tax Reform. This cross-party group was set up by the Scottish Government, tasked with examining alternatives to the Council Tax. The final report Just Change: A New Approach to Local Taxation was published on 14 December 2015.

== Political career ==
Wightman became a member of the Scottish Greens in 2009.

=== Member of the Scottish Parliament ===
In March 2015, the Scottish Greens balloted their members to select candidates for the 2016 election, and Wightman was placed second on their Lothian list. He was elected as an MSP on 5 May 2016. On 23 May he was announced as the Scottish Greens spokesperson on Communities (including Housing), Land Reform and Local Government.

Wightman was one of a group of Scottish politicians (two MSPs, an MP and three MEPs) who instituted proceedings against HM Government to clarify, through a judgment of the European Court of Justice, whether the Article 50 notice that formally started the Brexit process could be revoked unilaterally by the United Kingdom. In December 2018, the ECJ handed down its Wightman judgment in which it held that the Brexit notification could indeed be revoked unilaterally.

On 18 December 2020, Wightman announced his resignation from the Scottish Greens following a vote on an amendment to the Forensic Medical Services (Victims of Sexual Offences) (Scotland) Bill, alleging that the party was intolerant to discussion of potential clashes between transgender and women's rights. He stated in his resignation letter that voting for the amendment (and against the party whip) would have resulted in "complaints and disciplinary action leading to possible suspension, deselection or expulsion". The Scottish Greens' co-leader Lorna Slater later dismissed the impact of Wightman's resignation, saying in an interview to The Scotsman that although his departure had come as a "massive shock", it wasn't a big issue: "[Wightman] has very specific followers, but most people have no idea who he is." She also said that Wightman had not engaged with women's and LGBT groups within the Scottish Greens before his departure.

In preparation for the 2021 Scottish Parliament election, Wightman announced that he would be moving regions to stand in the Highlands and Islands, instead of Lothian. He was unsuccessful, receiving 3,367 list votes.

=== Post-Holyrood ===
In August 2021, Wightman explained in his blog that he resigned from the Greens because he wanted "an environment that is more tolerant, questioning, critical, empathetic and more willing to listen".

In November 2022, Wightman announced that he would not support a second Scottish independence referendum "until there is sustained support for it".

== Published work ==
- From Fraser Darling to Terry Wogan: A Perspective on Scotland's Forests, in Mollison, Denis (ed.) (1992), Wilderness with People: The Management of Wild Land, John Muir Trust, pp. 56 – 63
- Scottish Woodlands in a Global Context, in Ashmole, Philip (ed.) (1994), Restoring Borders Woodland, Peeblesshire Environmental Concern, pp. 6 – 10
- Who Owns Scotland (Canongate, 1996)
- Scotland: Land and Power. An Agenda for Land Reform (Luath, 1999)
- The Poor Had No Lawyers (Birlinn Books, Third Edition, 2015)
