= Jack Middleton (politician) =

Scottish politician

Jack Middleton MSP
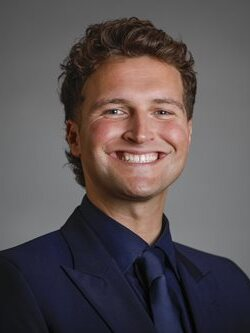
- Official Portrait, 2026

Member of Scottish Parliament for Aberdeen Central
- Incumbent
- Assumed office 7 May 2026
- Preceded by: Kevin Stewart
- Majority: 6,972 (25.7%)

Personal details
- Party: Scottish National Party

Jack Middleton is a Scottish politician who has served as a Member of Scottish Parliament for Aberdeen Central since May 2026. He is a member of the Scottish National Party.

== Biography ==
Middleton joined the SNP as a press officer in 2023. He worked on the campaign of Humza Yousaf in the 2023 Scottish National Party leadership election. Middleton was aged 30 in 2025. Middleton previously worked as a special adviser to John Swinney. He is the Scottish National Party candidate for the Aberdeen Central constituency in the 2026 Scottish Parliament election. He was selected to succeed Kevin Stewart.
