= Marco Biagi (politician) =

Scottish politician

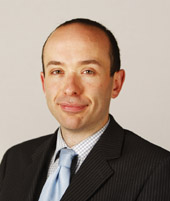

Minister for Local Government and Community Empowerment
- In office 21 November 2014 – 18 May 2016
- First Minister: Nicola Sturgeon
- Preceded by: Derek Mackay
- Succeeded by: Kevin Stewart

Member of the Scottish Parliament for Edinburgh Central
- In office 5 May 2011 – 24 March 2016
- Preceded by: Sarah Boyack
- Succeeded by: Ruth Davidson

Member of City of Edinburgh Council for Colinton/Fairmilehead
- In office 6 May 2022 – 19 November 2024

Personal details
- Born: 31 July 1982 (age 43) Alexandria, West Dunbartonshire, Scotland
- Party: Scottish National Party
- Education: University of St Andrews; University of Glasgow; Wadham College, Oxford; Yale University

Marco Biagi (born 31 July 1982) is a Scottish National Party (SNP) politician. He served as the Minister for Local Government and Community Empowerment from 2014 to 2016, and as the Member of the Scottish Parliament (MSP) for Edinburgh Central from 2011 to 2016.

== Early life ==
Biagi was born in Alexandria, West Dunbartonshire on 31 July 1982 to Mary and Antonio Biagi, a fish-and-chip shop owning Scots-Italian family. He attended secondary school at Hermitage Academy in Helensburgh. He studied International Relations at the University of St Andrews, and in 2002 was elected to take a one-year sabbatical from study to serve as Vice-President (Representation) of the Students' Association. In that year he also managed the unsuccessful campaign of Germaine Greer for election to the post of Rector. He graduated with a First in 2005. Biagi then began postgraduate study at Wadham College, Oxford University, but subsequently left and returned to Scotland.

In 2007 he began working for new MSP Keith Brown and moved to the SNP central staff in 2009. After studying part-time for two years while working, he completed a master's degree at Glasgow University in 2010.

== In Parliament ==
Biagi won the seat of Edinburgh Central in the 2011 Scottish Parliament elections, defeating the Labour incumbent Sarah Boyack by a narrow margin of 237 votes but achieving only the second lowest share of the vote of any successful SNP constituency candidate. He is understood to be the youngest person to have won election to the Scottish Parliament in a constituency seat. When he was sworn in as an MSP he took the oath in his native English and also Italian.

His maiden speech was in praise of renewable energy on 2 June 2011 followed by staging the first Member's Debate of the parliamentary term on 8 June in support of the campaign for the UK Green Investment Bank to be situated in Edinburgh. Although the campaign was successful, Biagi changed to a more critical stance when it emerged that the majority of staff were nonetheless based in London rather than his constituency.

Biagi has also been a persistent critic of the Edinburgh tram project, which runs through Edinburgh Central, and which he described as "an overpriced downgrade" after suggestions that it would have a longer journey time than the existing airport bus.

He publicly supported the retention of the SNP's policy of non-NATO membership in 2012 against a change proposed by the party's leadership, a stance which the deputy leader of the Scottish Conservatives suggested resulted in him being passed over for promotion as a Minister that autumn. After Jean Urquhart resigned from the SNP over the NATO policy change Biagi replaced her as Deputy Convener of the Scottish Parliament's Equal Opportunities Committee in October 2012.

In 2013 Biagi laid amendments to the Post-16 Education (Scotland) Bill to create duties on agencies including the Scottish Funding Council to support widening access to further and higher education, which were passed by Parliament with Scottish Government support. Shortly after he was elected as Honorary President of the Federation of Student Nationalists.

Openly gay since before he was elected, for his contributions in support of the passage of Scotland's same-sex marriage bill Biagi was named on the inaugural Scotland on Sunday Pink List of 50 influential LGBT Scots in 2014.

Biagi joined the Scottish Government as Minister for Local Government and Community Empowerment in November 2014. While in this role, in February 2015, he was appointed as co-chair of the Commission on Local Tax Reform – a cross-party group set up by the Scottish Government, tasked with examining alternatives to the Council Tax.

== After Parliament ==
Biagi began a PhD in political science at Yale University in the autumn of 2016, studying comparative politics.

In 2020 he sought a return to elected politics and put himself forward for selection as the SNP's candidate for Edinburgh Central. Party members chose Angus Robertson as their candidate instead.

In 2020, he commenced employment at SNP HQ to oversee the party's independence task force as a consultant. However, by 2021, he resigned, sharing on social media that, "the most promising job offer I've ever received turned out to be the most disappointing." He added that he was disappointed that SNP members in Edinburgh Central had decided they would, "rather have a pompous impressionable idiot than me".

He was elected as a local councillor for the Colinton/Fairmilehead ward in The City of Edinburgh Council election on 5 May 2022 and announced his resignation from that position on 19 November 2024.

Scottish Parliament
| Preceded by Sarah Boyack | Member of the Scottish Parliament for Edinburgh Central; 2011–2016 | Succeeded by Ruth Davidson |
