= Deputy Minister for Enterprise and Lifelong Learning =

The Deputy Minister for Enterprise and Lifelong Learning in Scotland was a cabinet position in the Scottish Government. The position was created in 1999, with the advent of devolution and the institution of the Scottish Parliament, taking over some of the roles and functions of the former Scottish Office that existed prior to 1999.

== Description ==
The Deputy Minister for Enterprise and Lifelong Learning (Allan Wilson) was responsible to the First Minister (Jack McConnell) and assisted the Enterprise Minister, (Nicol Stephen) in the performance of his duties and fulfilled the function of the Enterprise Minister in his absence.

The Deputy Minister for Enterprise and Lifelong Learning was responsible for economy, business and industry including Scottish Enterprise, Highlands and Islands Enterprise, trade and inward investment, further and higher education, science, corporate social responsibility, community business and co-operative development, European Structural Funds, energy, lifelong learning, training and skills.

== Areas of responsibility ==
- Enterprise/Business
  - Energy - Markets, BETTA, Oil/Gas, Consents, Nuclear
  - Enterprise Networks (Sen and HIE)
  - Innovation
  - Regional Selective Assistance
  - Drinks Industry
  - Construction Industry
  - Retail Industry
  - All other industries
  - Post Offices
  - Defence - Regiments
  - European Structural Funds - general
  - Future of ESF
  - Union liaison (STUC)
  - DTI Department of Trade and Industry and trade body liaison
  - PACE and redundancies
  - Economic statistics/analysis
  - Personal Bankruptcy and Diligence (Official support will be provided by Justice Department)
  - Corporate Social Responsibility
  - Community Business and Co-operative
- Lifelong Learning
  - Determined to Succeed - schools enterprise
  - SUfI and Learn Direct Scotland
  - Lifelong Learning Strategy
  - Adult literacy and numeracy
  - Skills
  - Beattie Implementation
  - Training Policy
  - Business Learning Accounts
  - Modern Apprenticeships
  - Welfare to Work

== Responsibility breakdown ==
=== Enterprise ===
To work with the Enterprise Networks to help deliver the enterprise strategy.

As part of its commitment to fostering long-term, sustainable economic growth in Scotland, the Executive works with the Enterprise Networks to help deliver the enterprise strategy aimed at creating a smart, successful Scotland.

=== Enterprise Networks ===
To foster long-term, sustainable economic growth in Scotland.

The Executive is committed to fostering long-term, sustainable economic growth in Scotland. Scottish Enterprise and Highlands and Islands Enterprise are the key economic development agencies in Scotland.

The Executive's document "A Smart, Successful Scotland" gives them their strategic direction.

At the local level Scottish Enterprise and Highlands and islands Enterprise operate through a network of Local Enterprise Companies (LECs). There are 12 in the Scottish Enterprise area and 10 in the Highlands and Islands Enterprise area.

=== Business in the Parliament ===
To work in partnership with business and establish an Annual Business Forum.

The Partnership Agreement commits the Scottish Government to work in partnership with business and establish an Annual Business Forum to develop ideas and maximise the drivers for growth.

The Executive jointly hosted a business conference with the Scottish Parliament on 22 and 23 April 2004.

The aim of this unique partnership event between the Executive and the Parliament was to engage Scottish business in continuing to grow Scotland's economy.

The Executive has considered the main issues raised at the Conference and in September 2004 produced a formal response to each of these issues. In July 2005, an updated response was published, to show policy development and implementation progress.

=== Convention of the Highlands and Islands ===
The Convention is a meeting between the Executive and its main partner agencies, represented by the chairperson of each organisation.

It is currently held twice yearly, and is hosted by a different local authority each time with the location alternating between a mainland and an island.

The Convention is intended to strengthen co-ordination between member organisations, the Executive and other representative bodies to better inform the development and realisation of strategic economic, environmental, cultural and social justice objectives.

The Convention is unique to the Highlands and Islands because the level of remoteness, rurality and sparseness of population here is not mirrored elsewhere in Scotland.

It recognises the diversity and differing needs of Highland and Islands communities, and the distinct nature of the challenges and opportunities that exist in the area. The Convention's focus will be on delivering these strategic objectives to the long-term benefit of the people of the Highlands and Islands, and Scotland.

=== Education and Training ===
To ensure that everybody has access to learning opportunities that can help them achieve their full potential - giving children and young people the best possible start in life as they move from school to university and college or into the workforce, ensuring employability and adaptability throughout life.

=== Work based training ===
To provide Work-based training opportunities designed to improve individual's skills and qualifications for work.

=== Lifelong learning and post-school transition ===
To provide strategic policy direction to all stakeholders in Scotland and sets out the Executive's policies and targets for five years.

=== Social work and social care ===
To ensure social work and care support services are adequate for the 21st century.

== See also ==
- Politics of Scotland
