= Gender budgeting =

Gender budgeting means preparing budgets or analyzing them from a gender perspective. Also referred to as gender-sensitive budgeting, this practice does not entail dividing budgets for women. It aims at dealing with budgetary gender inequality issues, including gender hierarchies and the discrepancies between women's and men's salaries. At its core, gender budgeting is a feminist policy with a primary goal of re-orienting the allocation of public resources, advocating for an advanced decision-making role for women in important issues, and securing equity in the distribution of resources between men and women. Gender budgeting allows governments to promote equality through fiscal policies by taking analyses of a budget's differing impacts on the sexes as well as setting goals or targets for equality and allocating funds to support those goals. This practice does not always target intentional discrimination but rather forces an awareness of the effects of financial schemes on all genders.

OECD notes that gender budgeting is a way for governments to promote equality through the budget process against persistent gender disparities in education, employment, entrepreneurship, and public life opportunities and outcomes. Planning budgets with the promotion of gender equality in mind has the potential to help policymakers address a range of inequalities embedded in public policy and resource allocation.

Gender budgeting is set up to help close the gender gap. Gender budgeting helps achieve important standards of public financial management. Equality is a fundamental value of the European Union and a major goal of the European Commission. Equality for all and equality in every sense of the word play a central role in achieving a prosperous and social Europe.

Promoting equality is important not only from a moral argument but also from an economic perspective. Studies have highlighted that more equal economies benefit from higher employment rates in terms of income distribution and access to education and other services. Several studies have demonstrated that inequality has significant economic costs and that improving equality can boost EU growth. Budgets are an important means of increasing equity in all dimensions. Budget allocations are a central means of achieving these goals.

== History ==
=== Origin and emergence ===
By the late 1970s, a broad range of specialized policy mechanisms were developed in the states of Australia to improve the economic and social status of women. This women's policy mechanism was not devised by the government but was developed by the so-called "femocrats" in the women's movement. These femocrats found employment in the women's policy sector and "created a feminist presence within the state itself". Against this background, the first gender budgeting initiative was undertaken in Australia in 1984.

Pioneering analyses of the impact of public budgets on gender relations were conducted, with the belief that budgets are an essential tool for promoting gender equality. This Australian effort was not only important for raising gender awareness, but also served as an important reference point for subsequent gender budgeting efforts.

=== 1995 UN World Conference on Women ===
In 1995, based on the discussions at the UN Fourth World Conference on Women held in Beijing, the UN Women recommended that governments systematically review public sector expenditures and adjust their budgets to ensure gender equality in access to expenditures. Since then, gender budgeting has become internationally recognized as a strategy for strengthening gender equality.

Progress has been made in economic participation, political opportunities, health, and education, particularly in terms of significant improvements in girls' enrollment in primary education, strengthening of women's legal rights, and reduction in maternal mortality. Several multilateral institutions are currently promoting gender budgeting through research support, technical assistance for gender budgeting initiatives, and information dissemination. By 2004, 179 out of 191 UN member states bound themselves to take action to tackle the problem.

The G20-Women, the official engagement group of the G20, called for increased investment in gender budgeting to ensure that fiscal policies advance gender equality in the short- and long-term recovery from the COVID-19 crisis.

=== Increasing transparency ===
Gender budgeting also increases transparency and participation in the budget process. In particular, orthodox economics has neglected the "care economy," even though it constitutes an important part of the economy, along with profit-oriented markets and the public service sector. The care economy refers to unpaid production and services in the private sphere (family, neighborhood, community) based primarily on women's unpaid labor. Public budgets usually consider only the monetary economy. As a result, free care and services are excluded from the macroeconomic framework of the national budget. "Gender budgeting" is increasingly needed to correct these disparities.

Feminist economists and gender budget analysts such as Rhonda Sharp and Diane Elson have cautioned against the "false economy" associated with ignoring the care economy. Women's engagement in these "unpaid jobs" can lead to a lack of employment climate and a lack of social security. Thus, integrating care economies into economic policy in general, and gender budgets in particular is a more broadly appropriate approach to welfare efficiency and costs than the traditional concept of economies.

== Objectives ==
Gender budget analysis aims at finding out whether women and men can access the same opportunities equally. In gender budget analysis, gaps are addressed so that those who are disadvantaged become empowered. A gender-sensitive budget analysis contains how budgets recognize and answer the needs of men and women, whether they are children, young, or adults. Gender budget analysis plays a key role in highlighting discrimination against women and how money is distributed between the two groups. This type of analysis contributes to finding solutions to gender discrimination and highlights empowerment or disempowerment among two distinct groups: men and women. Gender budgeting is not intended to look only at female budgets or policies but to rather examine the effects that gender has on all programs and policies.

The Council of Europe (2005) defines five objectives of gender budgeting: the first one being the most straightforward and the following ones, more implicit objectives that gender budgeting can also achieve.

=== 1. Gender equality ===
Gender budgeting primarily helps to dismantle gender inequalities. While these disparities may be associated with traditional aspects, especially on the cultural roles of men and women, they demonstrate inequalities in the allocation of public resources. The purpose of gender budgeting is to remedy such inequalities by ensuring that public policy is designed and delivered in an inclusive manner. The fundamental objective is then to use the budget and related policies to achieve gender equality as part of human rights. It will raise awareness about unintended and indirect discrimination against women.

=== 2. Accountability ===
Gender budgeting is a tool to monitor whether the government's commitments to gender equality are effectively translated into budgetary commitments. It facilitates the establishment of gender mainstreaming within government policies by assigning authorities clear responsibilities and by making it easier to know if they are meeting their gender equality objectives. Civil society and the media can therefore play an important role in monitoring and holding the government liable for their budgets.

=== 3. Transparency and participation ===
Gender budgeting helps increase participation in the budget process through public consultation, participation in budget preparation, or the monitoring of the outcomes which will thereby increase transparency.

=== 4. Efficiency ===
Gender-responsive budgets can improve information on different situations and needs of women and men as well as on potential distributional effects of budget measures. This allows governments to take better-informed and more evidence-based decisions in a more efficient decision-making framework.

=== 5. Good governance ===
Since gender inequalities are considered harmful to social cohesion, economic efficiency, and human development, gender budgeting can help to strengthen good governance in general. Due to the fact it can be considered as a tool promoting equal citizenship and fair distribution by reducing inequalities and poverty.

== Tools ==
There are different ways to implement gender budgeting. The process of gender budgeting tends to be varied across countries as there is a lack of consensus on the most effective approach These can come in different forms such as official budget proposals or just merely papers sketched by interest groups outside the government zone. Gender budgeting tools can play on the two major components of a budget :

1. Expenditure effects evaluated: Expenditure is evaluated by disaggregating the spending of the government into categories beneficial for women and girls.
2. Revenue effects evaluated: Another recent initiative to assess revenue policies is by aiming to fully end discrimination against women in the personal income tax.

Gender budgeting has been put into practice across many countries and its impacts assessed. The 2016 OECD Survey of Gender Budgeting Practices is one of the few existing documents on the extent of the implementation of gender budgeting and its impact. The survey revealed that 15 out of the 34 surveyed countries had already introduced gender budgeting while others had plans to introduce the concept in their budgetary processes.

The following implementation tools of gender budgeting are presented with the OECD typology which uses a classification according to the level budgeting cycle stage.

== Development by regions ==
To overcome gender-blind policies and budgets many government officials from different countries took it upon themselves to analyze differences and propose budgets that are considerate of the inequalities women face financially. Developments have been in practice all over the world.

An IMF working paper published in 2021 shows that on average, advanced economies in the G20 (AEs) have better Gender Budgeting Index (GBI) than emerging economies (EMEs). The IMF integrated into their GBI, 23 questions to assess the development of gender budgeting tools in those 19 countries and the European Union. The study also highlights some countries with significantly better GBI than their group counterparts like Canada, France, Austria, and Spain for Advanced G20 and Mexico for Emerging G20.

=== Africa ===
Africa is a region that faces many challenges in developing its economy, the majority of countries are low-income countries which makes it difficult for them to access the international financial market and make good use of their budgets. Public spending on education and health is generally insufficient.

To address this problem, several sub-Saharan governments have undertaken public financial management reforms. These reforms allow governments to integrate gender-oriented goals into program-based budgeting. The majority of gender budgeting efforts focus on the spending of public allocations and the design of public programs. However, gender inequality in Sub-Saharan Africa persists in access to education, wages, and health care.

In the last decade, North African countries have faced political conflicts and population uprisings. In this part of the world, unemployment rates remain high for women and young people. Many infrastructures remain difficult to access for women from non-urban areas. Therefore, North Africa faces the same challenge as Sub-Saharan countries to equally integrate women into the system. As a result, some North African countries (Morocco, Tunisia, Egypt) have started to invest in infrastructure, health care, and education as well as in tax policies and public finance management.

However Sub-saharan countries remain among the least developed countries, Sub-Saharan African countries are among the first to implement gender budgeting right after Australia which did it in the 80s. They use tax policies and tax administrations to improve gender equality and women's development. Tax policies are important in promoting gender equality and women's development. Whether it is men or women, government budgets impact them in different ways.

In the mid-1990s, the first sub-Saharan country to engage in gender budgeting was South Africa. The most successful sub-Saharan countries in gender budgeting are South Africa, Rwanda, and Uganda. This success is explained by the fact that gender budgeting is mandated by the Ministry of Finance in these countries. These 3 countries apply gender budgeting as welfare for the country and not only for women. These countries have received financial support from donors and NGOs for the gender budgeting effort.

==== Uganda ====
Uganda is a low-income country with an agriculture-based economy. The country has evolved through improved macroeconomic control and enhanced growth. Uganda's efforts on gender budgeting are mainly aimed at ensuring that the government addresses gender issues through the regular planning and budgeting process. As a result, thanks to these efforts, the country has been successful in addressing gender issues. These efforts are evident in the collaboration of government bodies, donors, and NGOs. Nevertheless, Uganda still has a long way to go to achieve gender equality.

In the 1990s, the first gender budgeting initiative by the Forum for Women in Democracy (FOWODE), an NGO, was launched, and over the years other plans have been implemented to improve the situation of women in the country and combate poverty. During this period, FOWOD collaborated with the Parliamentary Budget Office and budget officers to evolve in gender budgeting. One of the main objectives of FOWODE was to implement an initiative to support maternal health by creating "mama kits" with the help of the Ministry of Health.

In 1997, the Ugandan government introduced its Poverty Eradication Action Plan which incorporated a gender strategy. This plan aims to reduce poverty across the country among women.

In 2004–2005, the first real gender budgeting was included in the Budget Call Circular (country's budget) by the Ministry of Finance, Planning and Economic Development. The appendix integrated some guidelines on how to manage gender focus objectives in the budget for local governments and sector ministries.

From 2010 to 2015, the third Poverty Eradication Plan has been removed in favor of the National Development Plan. This Plan has as the center of attention human development, employment and growth. The main goal is the advancement of gender equality and women's empowerment through gender budgeting and gender-responsive monitoring. Most of the programs of the plan are reserved for women and girls.

==== Morocco ====
Morocco is the first country in North Africa to implement a gender budgeting initiative. Moreover, this initiative was the most advanced in the region. This initiative was launched in 2002 by the Ministry of Finance and Privatization with the assistance of the World Bank. Morocco aimed to effectively achieve the Millennium Development Goals. Therefore, they emphasized increasing women's public employment and collecting sex-disaggregated data.

The first Gender Report has been released in 2006 by the Ministry of Economy and Finance which encompasses 4 ministries that needed to point out key zones where there were gender gaps, assessments, and goals sets for upcoming performance. Then, different reports followed the first one and grew each year, to reach 80% of the federal budget in 2016.

First of all, the Gender Report was set up to be an appendix to the Economic and Financial Report. Nevertheless, it became an autonomous document. This report became a key role in Morocco's gender budgeting initiatives.

Furthermore, Morocco has also included gender budgeting in its legal framework with the 2003 Labor Code which requires equal salary for equal work and a ban on gender discrimination at work. In addition, this framework guarantees maternity and paternity leaves.

=== Asia ===
The Asia-Pacific region accounts for a quarter of the countries that support the gender budgeting to promote gender equality and women's rights and is home to gender budgeting's earliest and most innovative strategies. However, there is little documentation of the efforts made by countries in the region and the lessons learned from their experiences.

While the Asia-Pacific region has made progress in recent decades in terms of the development of women's rights laws and policies, limited funding remains an important obstacle to closing the gap between men and women and boys and girls.

In the Asia-Pacific region, various forms of gender-responsive budgeting initiatives can be found at the national, state, and regional levels in at least 29 countries. The gender-responsive budgeting landscape in the region is diverse and dynamic, with countries following different trajectories. Some countries, such as the Philippines, India, and Indonesia, have been sustaining a gender budgeting approach for more than a decade, while others have entered the fray more recently, either by expanding it into new sectors or by devolving authority to subnational levels of government.

==== Japan ====
Japan has introduced a gender budget. In 1999, the Basic Law for a Gender-equal Society was enacted, which stipulates that "the Government shall endeavor to take necessary measures for the smooth promotion of international cooperation on the formation of a gender-equal society ". In addition, the Basic Plan for Gender Equality (formulated in 2000) stipulated the promotion of the WID (Women in Development) Initiative.

This basic plan is revised every five years, with the latest being the "Fifth Basic Plan" issued in 2020. In this plan, gender issues are analyzed concerning 11 areas, including "Promotion of Gender Equality in Science, Technology, and Academia" and "Promotion of Gender Equality in Science, Technology, and Academia.

For example, in "Promotion of Gender Equality in Science, Technology, and Academia," numerical targets were set to increase the percentage of female university faculty members (lecturers and above) in science and engineering from 8.0% and 4.9% in 2016 to 12.0% and 9.0% in science and engineering by 2015, respectively. The budget has also been created in line with these goals.

The Basic Plan states that Japan will "incorporate and disseminate international norms and standards domestically" and "contribute to 'equality, development, and peace' in the global community," and expresses its commitment to gender equality in Japan as well as to gender equality in developing countries through development assistance. This is a major feature of Japan's gender equality policy.

Japan's Ministry of Foreign Affairs (MOFA) has been strengthening its support for gender in ODA within its internal structure and through gender considerations in its projects, and has incorporated a "gender equality perspective" in the basic policy of the ODA Charter and stipulated a "gender perspective" in its mid-term ODA policy.

=== Europe ===
In Europe, many countries have joined efforts in implementing gender-sensitive budgets. Spain, Iceland, Italy, Germany, Austria, Turkey, and the United Kingdom have all conducted research, collected data, and practiced different methodologies concerning gender budgeting. Vienna University of Economics and Business organized a conference with twenty different countries; this allowed the countries to share their conceptual ideas, theories, and experiences. This engagement transformed economic models to focus on feminist economics, which takes gender relations into account. Emerging economies of Europe are also following this trend by integrating gender-oriented objectives in their budget planning.

==== European Union ====
At the European level, gender budgeting is a tool used to meet the commitments to gender equality and gender mainstreaming as defined in the treaties. Several member states have already introduced gender budgeting programs, but at the EU level, the process is still at an early stage. The Commission is experimenting with a gender perspective in the draft of the 2023 budget. The pilot project has the purpose to track the contributions of EU spending in fostering gender equality. Additionally, the objective is to collect data to later assess the impact of EU financing on gender equality. Despite the introduction of gender budgeting in the EU budget, the European Court of Auditors (ECA) concluded recently that the European Commission should increase its efforts on the matter. In general, progress in terms of gender mainstreaming is slowing down: the proposals for the 2021–2027 multiannual financial framework (MFF) show a lower level of ambition to support gender equality than the previous MFF. The EU focuses on a standalone and horizontal definition of gender equality with no quantitative target which does not foster significant development in gender analysis of the budget.

==== Belgium ====
In Belgium, gender budgeting is established in the framework of the 2007 law on gender mainstreaming. The law states that a gender perspective must be considered in all federal policies. Gender budgeting is introduced in Article 2 of the law: "the integration of the gender perspective into the whole of its policies, measures, budgetary preparations and actions to avoid or correct inequalities between women and men shall be ensured." In 2010 a specific circular on gender budgeting was published, it includes the objectives and the procedure to follow to implement a gender lens to the budget. Following this circular, all federal public services will have to submit their budget to a gender analysis. Before that, budget circulars were mostly focused on awareness

Belgium adopts ex-ante gender impact assessment as their only tool to implement gender budgeting. This is part of a gender-informed resource allocation budgeting system. Belgian institutions are using a tagging system to comply with the aforementioned circular. The classification is described as follows in the "Manual for the application of gender mainstreaming within the federal administration": the first category is for non-gender related elements like technical credits and internal functioning. The second category includes credits related to actions aimed at achieving gender equality like higher male/female presence at work, training... The last category gathers all credits related to public policies with a gender dimension like subsidies, projects and actions, allocations etc. Category 2 files require a gender note annexed to each project, which is an enumeration of all the credits that were applied to promote gender equality. Category 3 files require a gender comment explaining the gender dimension. This gender comment includes a comprehensive analysis of the composition of the target group and a public expenditure incidence analysis. Every two years, the tagging system is assessed by the Institute for the Equality of Women and Men (IEWM) to check if the circular is well applied.

Belgium created an Interdepartmental Coordination Group (ICG) composed of officials from different public services and the federal Institute for the Equality of Women and Men. The objective of the group is to establish a transversal approach and ensure a consistent strategy. The ICG writes semi-annual reports on the follow-up of the federal implementation of gender mainstreaming.

=== North America ===
==== United States ====
In the United States, there have been gender budgeting efforts in California and Georgia. San Francisco, California, began developing a gender-sensitive budget in 1998; Fulton County, Georgia, began gender budgeting efforts in 2007. In Georgia, gender budgeting researchers have gathered rich and useful data through interviews with policymakers concerned with gender equality and through multiple meetings involving a focus group composed of task members of different departments. In California, relevant data were collected through interviews, observations of a commission meeting, from non-profit organizations, and the municipal website.

==== Canada ====
Canada is one of the most advanced countries in terms of gender budgeting. They implement a Gender-Based Analysis Plus (GBA+) to assess the potential effects of policies, legislation, and programs on different groups. Canada extended the gender perspective by taking into account other identity factors included in the "plus" like ethnicity, sexual orientation, age, religion, level of income, and disability.

The 2018 Gender Budgeting Act collects existing practices of GBA+ and requires the government to report annually how gender and diversity were impacted by new budget measures and similarly for tax expenditures analysis. Under this Act, the government is committed to take into consideration the result of the GBA+ in its budget decisions.

For the 2018 budget, the Canadian government integrated the Gender Results Framework (GRF) outlining their principal gender equality priorities. The GRF is a governmental tool introduced to guide future policy decisions and track progress in gender equality and diversity given the established priorities.

== Impact ==
The impact of gender budgeting is hard to pinpoint owing to the recency of the practice and the unavailability of adequate data to support its usefulness. In countries that have introduced gender budgeting, indicators of the usefulness of the practice have emerged in the stimulation of policy adoption to address gender inequality in such key areas as education, income disparities, security, health outcomes, social and economic welfare, political representation, and labor participation. With more data on gender budgeting becoming available with time, its impact will be assessed and feedback incorporated into the generation of better policies.

Gender budgeting will have different impacts depending on the region in which it is implemented. For Africa, gender budgeting improves the use of fiscal tools to address gender inequality and women's development. African countries need to ensure that both girls and boys have equal access to primary and secondary education, and access to health care for both men and women. Furthermore, gender budgeting helps African women to develop themselves in a patriarchal world where they are still second-class citizens.

About Europe, gender budgeting means that women face a high risk of poverty due to the combined effect of structural reforms and the shrinking of social protection systems and the evolution of unemployment rates since the beginning of the last decade. Gender budgeting is important for the development of gender equality in many European countries, especially in the last former USSR countries that were allowed to turn on civil society. `

In Asia, gender budgeting contributed to fiscal policies with gender equality focus in some countries, emphasizing gender. Secondly, the increasing fiscal decentralization currently experienced in Asia is leading to the integration of gender budgeting at different sub-national levels of government. Previously, it was uncommon for local initiatives to be launched except in India, the Philippines, and Indonesia. In addition, gender budgeting has led the continent to examine the performance of public expenditure through a gender lens.

As a result, gender budgeting has enabled a new analysis of the income tax structure in some countries of Asia like India where gender-budgeting policies appeared as new. Furthermore, gender budgeting accounts for support for women activists and social organizations to reclaim better governmental allowances and gender equity.

== Challenges ==
When implementing gender budgeting into policy there are many challenges and limitations. Many countries struggle to introduce the concept of gender budgeting. Political, regional, and cultural factors are used as indicators to measure gender equality. These indicators are vital in the gender budgeting process; however, they fail to determine whether or not an ultimate goal has been reached. Also, gender budgeting is interdisciplinary, so different scholars struggle to accept the techniques of gender budgeting. Feminists face the issue of trying to promote gender budgeting is creating connections and relationships with political actors that will pursue gender budgeting developments.

More and more countries are interested in gender budgeting, which is potentially growing. For the future, the important thing would be to focus on these activities:

- Collaboration between the different countries that apply gender budgeting in a process of sharing and helping each other.
- Different governments should allocate their funds for gender budgeting and for objectives that will contribute to gender equality.
- Donors involved in gender budgeting must be consistent.

In the Pacific and South and Southwest Asia, the need to address patriarchy, particularly related discriminatory, prejudicial, and closed norms, ideas, attitudes, values, beliefs, and perceptions was identified. Taking into account culture, religion, and tradition, Beijing's +20 respondent countries agreed that modifying norms and behaviors in favor of gender equality is a long-term, but important, endeavor.

== Contribution of feminist economics ==
Most of the considerations developed through the gender budgeting tools are derived from the feminist economics doctrine. By deconstructing the "neutral" economy and the consideration of the care economy, gender budgeting enables governments to integrate this gender perspective in the budget impact assessment. Therefore, it addresses the gender blindness criticisms associated with public policies and budgets raised by several feminist economists like Diane Elson. Gender budgeting will then incorporate the gender differences that are cemented in social systems of reproduction. Public budgets tend to ignore key social reproduction roles such as the maintenance of domestic spaces, human relationships, and bodies which is mostly done by women. The auditing of gender budgets allows for the visualization of women's unpaid work of social reproduction and its contribution to the well-being of the entire society. This section gathers some illustrations of what could a gender-sensitive budget take into account in its budgeting process.

Reframing spending on human capital as investment instead of expenditure. By having a broader overview, the investment in free universal childcare could lead in England to a reduction of the gender pay gap by 3 percentage points and a closing of the employment gap by 5 percentage points.

When governments think about cuts in public services, they can take into account that it will have a greater impact on women given the "triple whammy" concept. This refers to the fact that women are primary users of public services, they are also main deliverers and they are more likely to take the loss of public services upon themselves. By balancing the loss of public benefits for example with unpaid work, this reduces their ability to participate in the labor force.

Another example can be highlighted with the traditional pattern of car ownership stating that on average men have larger vehicles and drive more often than women. This would mean that tax cuts for fuel consumptions would mainly benefit men.

Feminist economics brings a different perspective to the implementation of austerity measures in times of crisis. Recessions usually have a bigger negative impact on men than on women due to the gender-segregated employment: on average, men occupy more cyclically volatile jobs than women, making them less shielded to crises. Some authors underline the fact that this is mostly government responses to crisis that harm women's employment through cuts in public budgets. This can be explained by the overrepresentation of women in the public sector. Authors like Diane Perrons and Ania Plomien highlight the important role of gender budgeting to integrate the gender lens into the discussion and push for more feminist-Keynesian ideas in economic downturns.

== See also ==
- Affirmative action
- Discrimination
- Equal pay for women
- Feminization of poverty
- Gender Inequality Index
