= Minister for Local Government Empowerment and Planning =

The Minister for Local Government Empowerment and Planning was a junior ministerial post in the Scottish Government. As a result, the Minister did not attend the Scottish Cabinet. The minister supported the Cabinet Secretary for Finance, who has overall responsible for the portfolio.

The last Minister for Local Government Empowerment and Planning was Joe FitzPatrick MSP, who was appointed on 29 March 2023 and resigned on 8 May 2024 before the role was undertaken by the Public Finance Minister.

== Overview ==
The Minister had responsibility for:

- local government
- planning and National Planning Framework 4 (NPF4)
- town centre regeneration including business improvement districts
- regeneration policy and the place-based investment programme
- retail policy, recovery and strategy

== History ==
In 2011, the position of Minister for Local Government and Planning was created; the portfolio changed in November 2014 following a reshuffle by Nicola Sturgeon when she became First Minister of Scotland. The post was rebranded at that point to Minister for Local Government and Community Empowerment.

In September 2012, the junior post of Minister for Housing and Welfare was announced, with a portfolio intended to reflect the important role of housing in aiding economic recovery and the challenges that face those in poverty. In May 2016, Nicola Sturgeon reshuffled junior ministers and the post joined local government and housing in a new Minister for Local Government and Housing role. Planning was added to the title in June 2018. The title was changed in May 2021 to Minister for Social Security and Local Government at the start of the third Sturgeon government, with the post also taking responsibility for social security, which between 2018 and 2021 was the responsibility of a separate cabinet-level post, the Cabinet Secretary for Social Security and Older People. In March 2023, the post became Minister for Local Government Empowering and Planning under the Yousaf government.

In May 2024, the responsibilities were absorbed under the Minister for Community Wealth and Public Finance's portfolio under the leadership of John Swinney.

== List of office holders ==
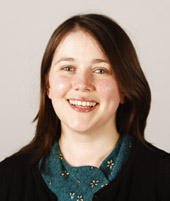
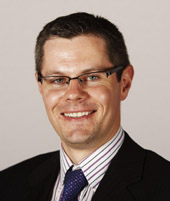
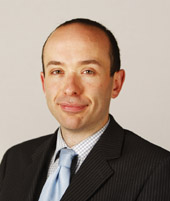
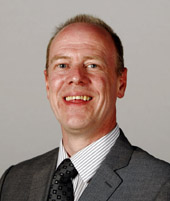
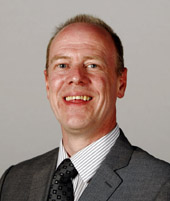
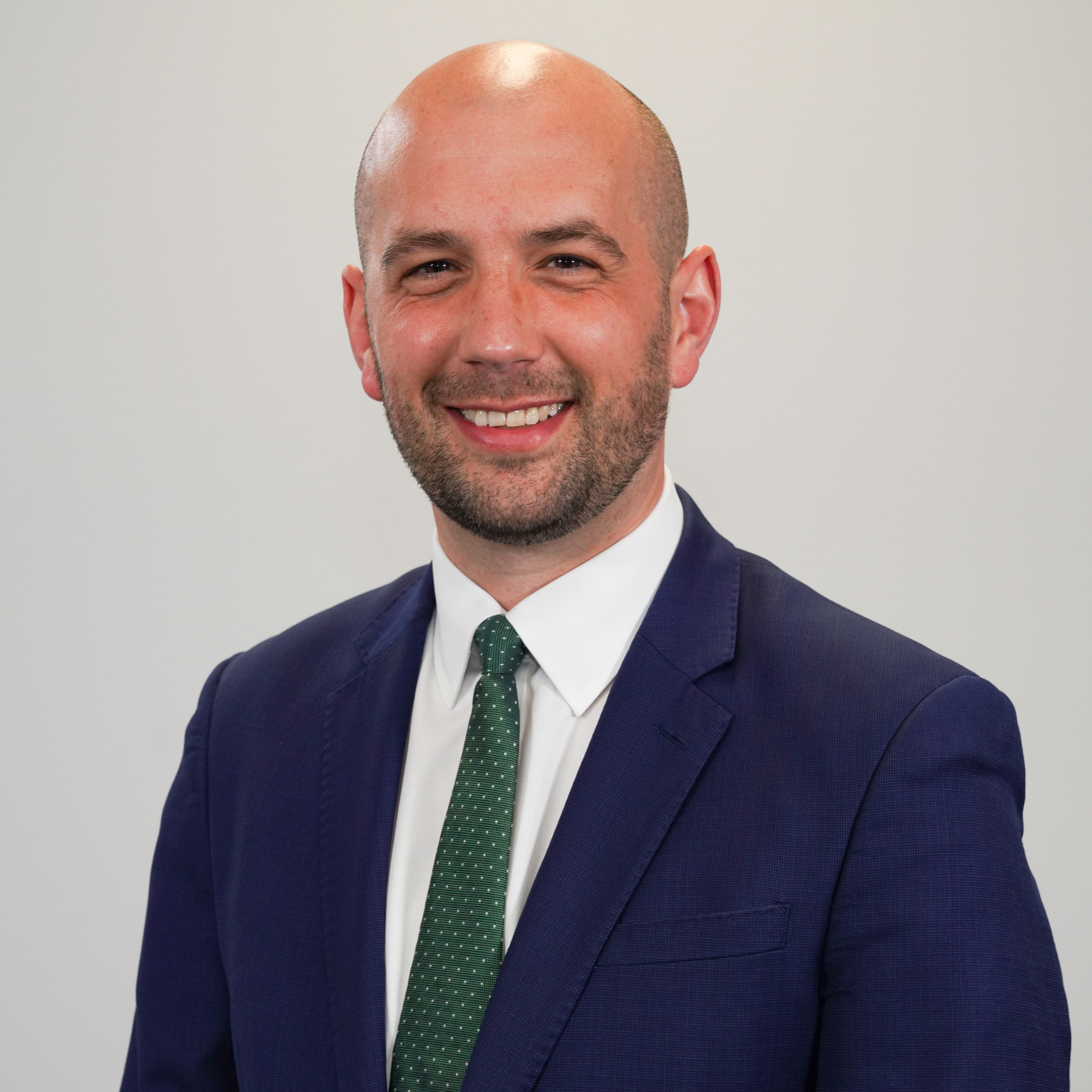
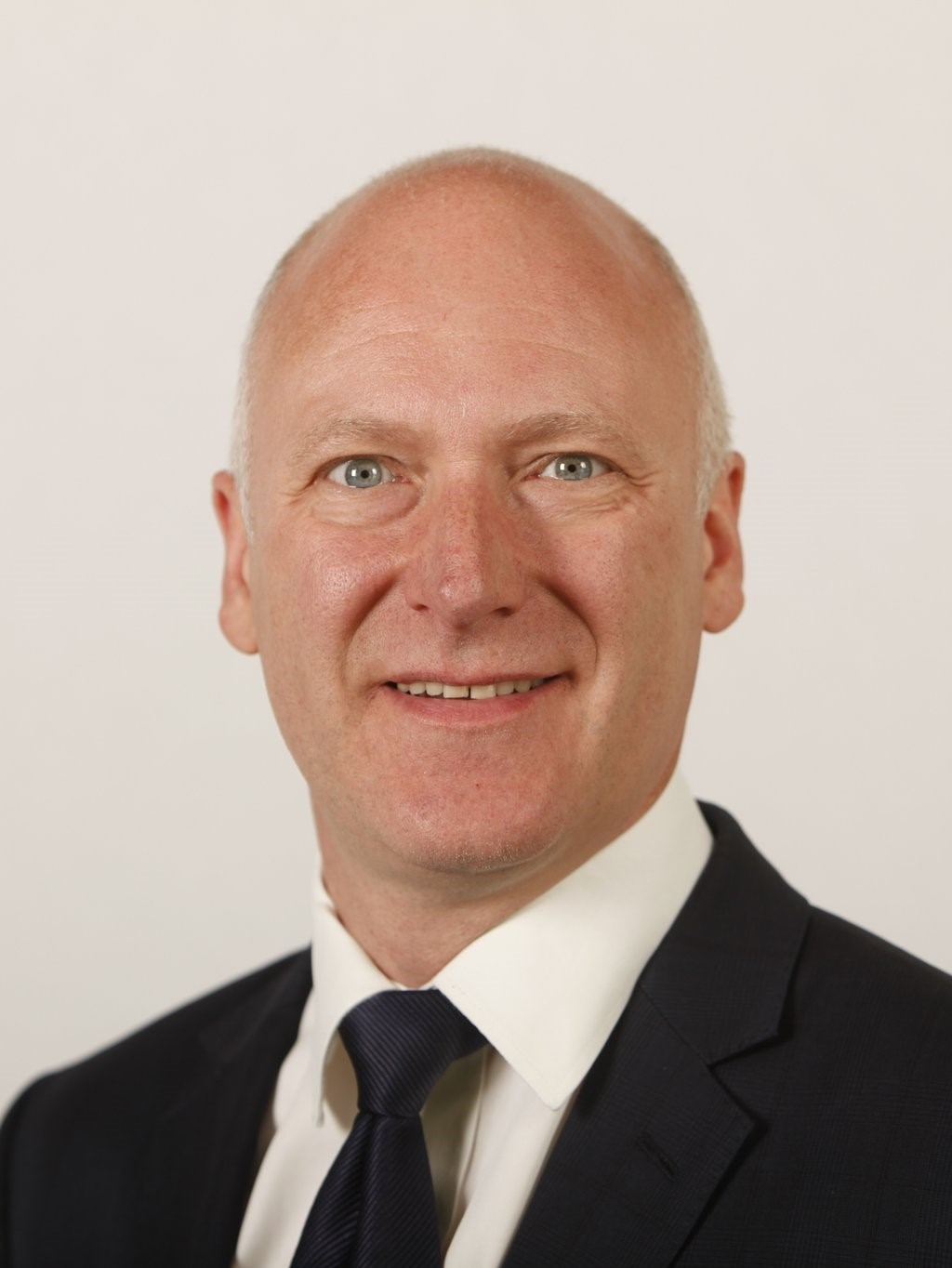
=== Minister for Local Government and Planning ===
Name	Portrait	Entered office	Left office	Party	First Minister
Aileen Campbell		25 May 2011	5 December 2011	Scottish National Party	Alex Salmond
Derek Mackay		6 December 2011	21 November 2014	Scottish National Party	Alex Salmond
=== Minister for Local Government and Community Empowerment ===
Marco Biagi		21 November 2014	18 May 2016	Scottish National Party	Nicola Sturgeon
=== Minister for Local Government and Housing ===
Kevin Stewart		18 May 2016	27 June 2018	Scottish National Party	Nicola Sturgeon
=== Minister for Local Government, Housing and Planning ===
Kevin Stewart		27 June 2018	20 May 2021	Scottish National Party	Nicola Sturgeon
=== Minister for Social Security and Local Government ===
Ben Macpherson		20 May 2021	29 March 2023	Scottish National Party	Nicola Sturgeon
=== Minister for Local Government Empowerment and Planning ===
Joe FitzPatrick		29 March 2023	8 May 2024	Scottish National Party	Humza Yousaf
