= Aberdeen City Youth Council =

Youth council

- Company type: Youth Participation Organisation
- Industry: Youth empowerment, youth politics, representation
- Founded: 1998, 2008 as "Aberdeen City Youth Council"
- Headquarters: Rosemount Community Centre, Rosemount, Aberdeen, Scotland
- Area served: Aberdeen

Aberdeen City Youth Council is an organisation that aims to give young people a voice in decision-making at a citywide level in Aberdeen, Scotland. It is open to young people, aged 12–25 years of age. It is supported by Aberdeen City Council financially and by means of staff support, through the City Council's Youth Participation Officer.

== History ==
It was previously known as the Youth Action Committee (YAC) and Listen Young People Speaking (LYPS) which performed a similar role in Aberdeen since its establishment in 1998.

In October 2010 they launched a survey to determine local attitudes on various issues; by May 2011 they had collated 165 responses. In November 2014, the chair wrote to the council after changes were made to school menus around packaged food items. In 2015 they held a sex-education session for 22 pupils, after reaching the conclusion that sex education in local schools was lacking in terms of coverage of LGBT (lesbian, gay, bisexual and transgender) issues and consent.

It was a registered charity from 1 January 1992 until 12 April 2016.

== Structure ==
Youth Councillors are co-opted by the Youth Council's membership to sit on the body as long as they are eligible. Membership is open to any young person aged 12–25 years of age who lives, works or studies in Aberdeen.

The Aberdeen City Youth Council works closely with various organisations across Aberdeen, including; but not limited to: community centres, community councils, cultural organisations, local area forums and local businesses.
